= Noah Cates =

American ice hockey player (born 1999)

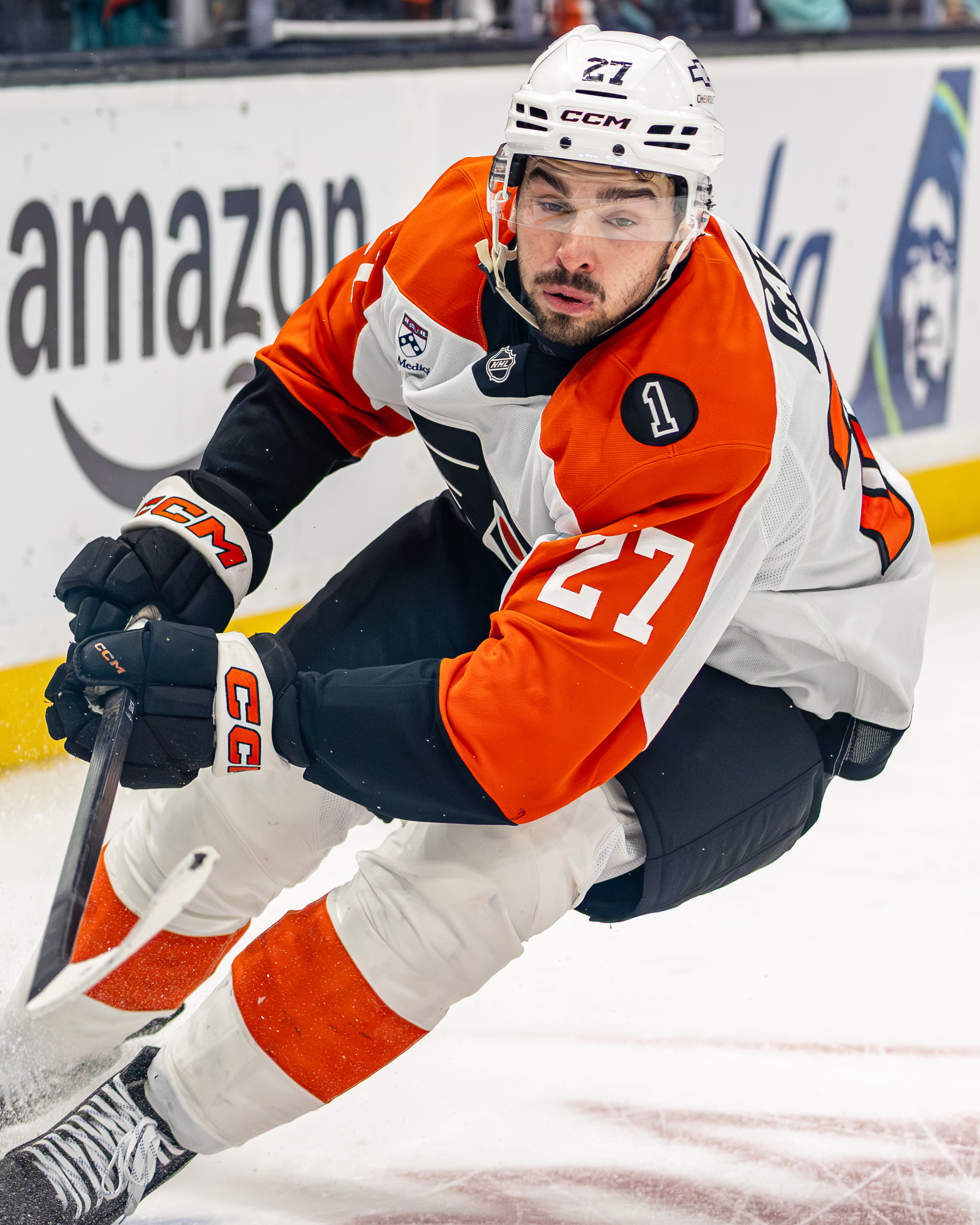
- Cates with the Flyers in 2025
- Born: February 5, 1999 (age 27) Stillwater, Minnesota, U.S.
- Height: 6 ft 2 in (188 cm)
- Weight: 194 lb (88 kg; 13 st 12 lb)
- Position: Left wing
- Shoots: Left
- NHL team: Philadelphia Flyers
- National team: United States
- NHL draft: 137th overall, 2017; Philadelphia Flyers
- Playing career: 2022–present

Noah Allen Cates (born February 5, 1999) is an American professional ice hockey player who is a left winger for the Philadelphia Flyers of the National Hockey League (NHL). The Flyers selected Cates in the fifth round, with the 137th overall pick, of the 2017 NHL entry draft. Cates has also been a member of the United States men's national ice hockey team, serving as an alternate captain at the 2022 Winter Olympics in Beijing.

Born in Stillwater, Minnesota, Cates grew up practicing ice hockey with his older brother Jackson. After his time at Stillwater Area High School, he spent a season with the Omaha Lancers of the United States Hockey League (USHL) before joining the Minnesota Duluth Bulldogs for the 2018–19 season. Cates earned All-NCHC honors all four seasons at Duluth and won the 2019 NCAA Division I championship as a freshman. He joined the Flyers at the end of his college career, where he has found success as a two-way forward.

== Early life ==
Cates was born February 5, 1999, in Stillwater, Minnesota, to Jeff and Jenny Cates. His uncle Jay played three seasons of college ice hockey with the Minnesota Golden Gophers, while his father won the 1988 NCAA Division III men's ice hockey tournament with the Wisconsin–River Falls Falcons. Cates began practicing hockey in his basement with this brother Jackson, and the pair played on the same childhood teams. A member of the Stillwater Area High School ice hockey team, Cates' overtime goal that sent his team to the state tournament was featured on SportsCenter. The next year, he recorded 20 goals and 65 points in 25 games for Stillwater.

Rather than entering college immediately after his 2017 high school graduation, Cates spent time in the United States Hockey League (USHL) to improve physically and develop his frame. The Omaha Lancers had taken Cates in Phase I of the 2015 USHL draft, and at the end of his high school season, he joined the team for the remainder of the 2016–17 USHL season. In 11 games, Cates had two junior ice hockey goals and five assists. Shortly afterwards, the Philadelphia Flyers of the National Hockey League (NHL) selected Cates in the fifth round, with the 137th overall pick, of the 2017 NHL entry draft. After a slow start to the 2017–18 season, with six goals and 14 points in his first 22 games, Cates broke out for the remainder of the year, finishing his full season in Omaha with 21 goals and 55 points in 60 games, as well as a +21 plus–minus rating.

== Playing career ==
=== College ===
Cates joined the Minnesota Duluth Bulldogs for the 2018–19 season, making his college hockey debut on October 6 against Minnesota. He scored his first goal the next day in Duluth's 7–4 loss to Minnesota. That January, Cates moved to the top line with Peter Krieger and Nick Swaney, and the trio contributed 10 goals and 18 points in their first 18 games of the calendar year. Cates's first multi-goal game came on March 1, where he scored twice and assisted once in a 4–2 win over the Miami RedHawks, earning National Collegiate Hockey Conference (NCHC) Offensive Player of the Week honors for his performance. Finishing the season with nine goals and 23 points, Cates was named to the NCHC All-Rookie Team and was a finalist for NCHC Rookie of the Year. The Bulldogs shut out the UMass Minutemen to win the 2019 NCAA Division I men's ice hockey tournament, with Cates scoring in the 3–0 championship game.

Cates began the 2019–20 season playing on the same line as his brother, with six of their combined first eight goals of the season coming while the pair were on the ice together. Cates earned praise from coach Scott Sandelin that season for his consistency, physical play, and competitive nature. A natural left wing, Cates took over at center in place of his older brother at the end of February, when Jackson sustained a clavicle fracture. At the time the remainder of the 2019–20 season was canceled due to the effects of the COVID-19 pandemic, Cates had 14 goals and 33 points in 34 games for the Bulldogs. He received All-NCHC First Team and AHCA All-American Second Team honors and was a finalist for the NCHC Forward of the Year award.

Going into the 2020–21 season, Cates was named captain of the Bulldogs, becoming the first junior captain in Duluth since Adam Krause in 2014. The NCHC also named Cates to their Preseason All-Conference Team. Taking on the role of top-line center for the Bulldogs after Justin Richards left to play for the New York Rangers, Cates saw a dip in offensive production during his junior season, with five goals and 19 points in 28 games. He was named to the All-NCHC Second Team, one of four Bulldogs to receive All-NCHC honors. The Bulldogs lost to the Minutemen in the 2021 NCAA Division I men's ice hockey tournament semifinals, with Cates recording an assist in the 3–2 overtime loss.

Rather than leaving college to begin his professional ice hockey career, Cates returned to the Bulldogs for the 2021–22 season, where he repeated as captain and as a Preseason All-Conference selection. The Bulldogs added three centers before the season, allowing Cates to move back to wing. He missed four games in February against the Denver Pioneers and North Dakota Fighting Hawks while attending the 2022 Winter Olympics, returning to score a shootout goal in the Bulldogs' February 22 win over the St. Cloud State Huskies. Finishing the season with 11 goals and 24 points in 35 games, Cates was an All-NCHC Honorable Mention. Duluth lost 2–1 to Denver in the regional finals of the 2022 NCAA Division I men's ice hockey tournament, and Cates finished his college ice hockey career with 39 goals and 99 points in 139 games.

=== Professional ===
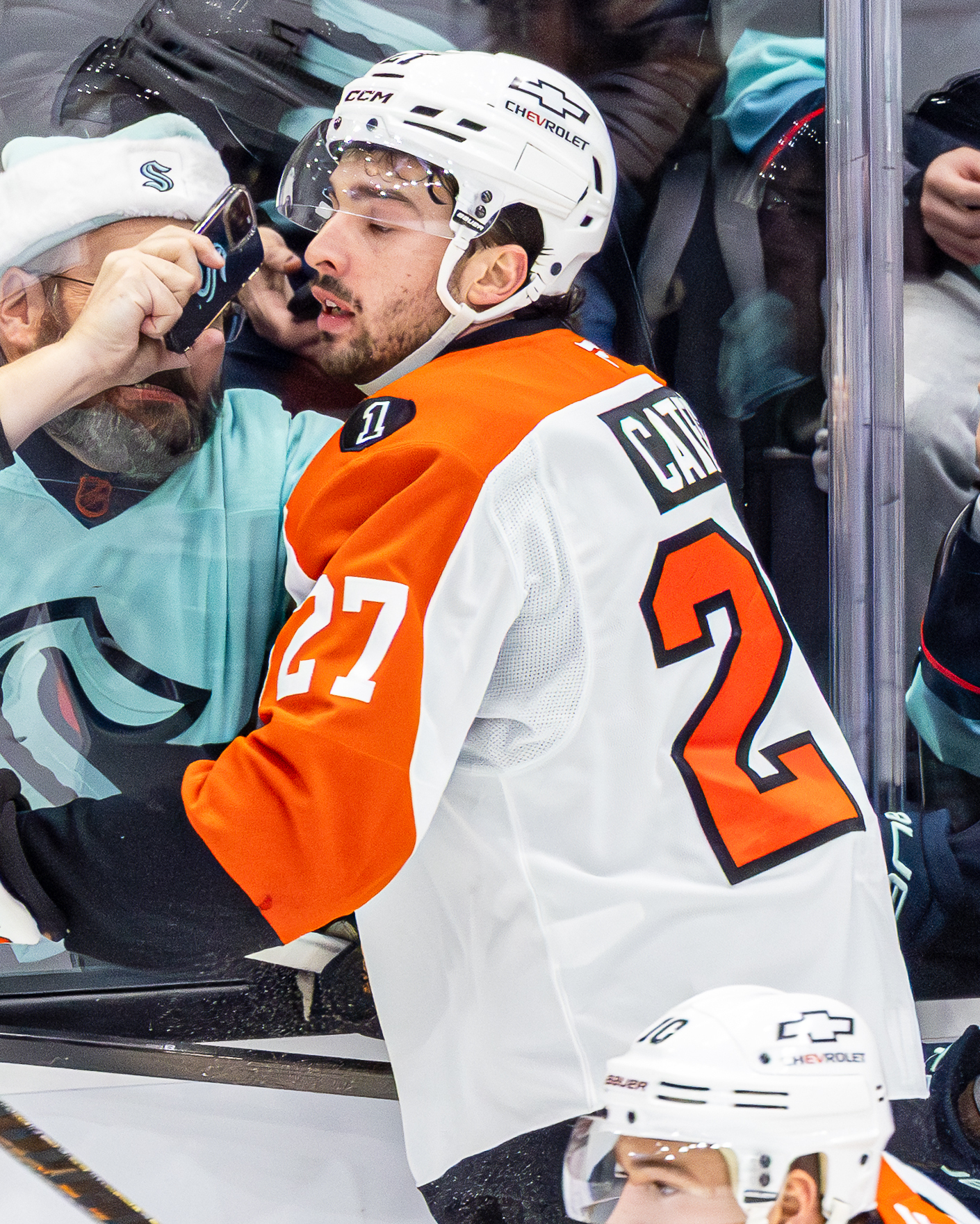
Cates with the Flyers in 2025

On March 27, 2022, shortly after the end of his college season, Cates signed a two-year entry-level contract with the Flyers, which went into effect for the remainder of the 2021-22 NHL season. He made his NHL debut two days later, making three shots and starting on left wing in a 4–1 loss to his hometown Minnesota Wild. His first NHL goal came on April 5, in the first period of a 4–2 loss to the Columbus Blue Jackets. In 16 games to end the season, Cates recorded five goals and nine points, and he earned praise from interim coach Mike Yeo for his maturity and "really good hockey sense".

With Sean Couturier not ready for opening night, head coach John Tortorella moved Cates to center to start the 2022–23 season. After struggling out of the gate, scoring only one point in his first 11 games, he adjusted to the role throughout the season. Injuries to prominent players like Couturier, Cam Atkinson, and James van Riemsdyk forced Cates into a significant role as a rookie, where he served as a defensive-oriented two-way forward. By January and into February, Cates found chemistry and consistency playing on a line with Joel Farabee and Travis Konecny. One of four rookie forwards to play all 82 games during the 2022–23 season, Cates posted 13 goals and 38 points while leading all Flyers forwards with 1,456 minutes of ice time.

A restricted free agent at the end of the 2022–23 season, Cates re-signed with the Flyers for two years and $5.25 million on July 10, 2023. In preparation for the 2023–24 season, Cates worked on improving his offensive ability and his face-off skills. Although he continued to succeed defensively, Cates was dropped from the first to the fourth line in November after continuing to struggle with scoring. On November 25, Cates fractured his foot blocking a shot against the New York Islanders. At the time, he had played 119 consecutive games to begin his career. He missed the next 22 games, returning to the lineup on January 15 against the St. Louis Blues. With only four points in 21 games before the injury, Cates told reporters he approached his recovery as a "mental reset" to improve his confidence and strength. Filling in at center on nights when Couturier was unavailable, Cates predominantly played on the wing with Ryan Poehling and Garnet Hathaway. He finished the year with six goals and 18 points in 59 games and told reporters that his season had suffered due to "an identity crisis and then some confidence stuff, some injuries", and citing his focus on offense instead of defense as a struggle.

After serving as a healthy scratch for four of the Flyers' first five games of the 2024–25 season, Cates took over as a penalty kill specialist, drawing positive comparisons to Couturier for his defensive prowess. He found offensive success that December on a line with Bobby Brink and Tyson Foerster. The trio scored a combined 25 points in their first 15 games together, including a five-game goal streak for Cates. Although the line was assembled to accommodate other player combinations, the Cates-Brink-Foerster trio played the most minutes of any forward combination through the end of February. Brink believed the trio were successful because they were "predictable" and could anticipate how their teammates would react during plays. Over the course of the season, Cates took on a larger role both as a two-way forward and as a leader in the locker room. At the Flyers' end-of-season award banquet, Cates received the Gene Hart Memorial Award as the player who demonstrated the most "heart" during the Flyers' season. He finished the year with 16 goals and 37 points in 78 games.

Cates signed a four-year, $16 million extension with the Flyers on June 3, 2025. Going into the 2025–26 season, Cates hoped to continue his development on offense. After recording only four assists in 17 games between January 1 and the Olympic break, Cates surged for 12 points in his next 13 games, which he attributed to the mental reset of the long midseason break. He finished the regular season with a career-high 18 goals and 47 points in 82 games. Cates made his postseason debut against the Pittsburgh Penguins in the first round of the 2026 Stanley Cup playoffs, and he scored his first playoff goal in the third game of that series. After recording one goal and three assists in his eight postseason games, Cates sustained a fractured foot in Game 2 of the Flyers' second-round series against the Carolina Hurricanes. He missed the remainder of the series, which the Flyers lost in four games.

== International play ==
Medal record

Representing United States

Ice hockey

World Junior Championships
Silver medal – second place	2019 Canada	

Cates made his international ice hockey debut with the United States men's national junior ice hockey team at the 2019 World Junior Ice Hockey Championships in Canada. He finished the tournament with one goal and three points in seven games while playing a heavy part on Team USA's penalty kill. The one goal came against the Czech Republic in the tournament quarterfinals off an assist from Jack Hughes. Cates and the United States won silver at the tournament, losing 3–2 to Finland in the championship game.

With NHL players not participating due to the disruptions caused by the COVID-19 pandemic, Cates was one of 15 college ice hockey players named to the United States men's national ice hockey team for the tournament at the 2022 Winter Olympics in Beijing. He was named one of three alternate captains for the tournament, serving behind captain Andy Miele. Playing wing on the third line, Cates had one goal in four games before Team USA was eliminated in a quarterfinal loss to Slovakia.

== Personal life ==
Cates's older brother Jackson made his NHL debut with the Flyers in 2021, and he has most recently appeared with the Rockford IceHogs, the American Hockey League (AHL) affiliate of the Chicago Blackhawks.

== Career statistics ==
=== Regular season and playoffs ===
			Regular season					Playoffs
Season	Team	League	GP	G	A	Pts	PIM	GP	G	A	Pts	PIM
2015–16	Omaha Lancers	USHL	2	1	0	1	2	—	—	—	—	—
2016–17	Omaha Lancers	USHL	11	2	5	7	6	—	—	—	—	—
2017–18	Omaha Lancers	USHL	60	21	34	55	26	4	1	2	3	0
2018–19	U. of Minnesota Duluth	NCHC	40	9	14	23	33	—	—	—	—	—
2019–20	U. of Minnesota Duluth	NCHC	34	14	19	33	35	—	—	—	—	—
2020–21	U. of Minnesota Duluth	NCHC	28	5	14	19	25	—	—	—	—	—
2021–22	U. of Minnesota Duluth	NCHC	37	11	13	24	19	—	—	—	—	—
2021–22	Philadelphia Flyers	NHL	16	5	4	9	4	—	—	—	—	—
2022–23	Philadelphia Flyers	NHL	82	13	25	38	12	—	—	—	—	—
2023–24	Philadelphia Flyers	NHL	59	6	12	18	0	—	—	—	—	—
2024–25	Philadelphia Flyers	NHL	78	16	21	37	14	—	—	—	—	—
2025–26	Philadelphia Flyers	NHL	82	18	29	47	44	8	1	3	4	0
NHL totals			317	58	91	149	74	8	1	3	4	0

Source: Elite Prospects

=== International ===
Year	Team	Event	Result	GP	G	A	Pts	PIM
2019	United States	WJC	2nd place, silver medalist(s)	7	1	2	3	2
2022	United States	OG	5th	4	1	0	1	2
Junior totals				7	1	2	3	2
Senior totals				4	1	0	1	2

Source: Elite Prospects

== Awards and honors ==
Award	Year(s)	Ref.
College
AHCA All-American Second Team	2020	
All-NCHC First Team	2020	
All-NCHC Second Team	2021	
All-NCHC Honorable Mention	2022	
NCHC All-Rookie Team	2019	
NCAA Division I men's ice hockey tournament champion	2019	
