= Jack Drury =

American ice hockey player (born 2000)

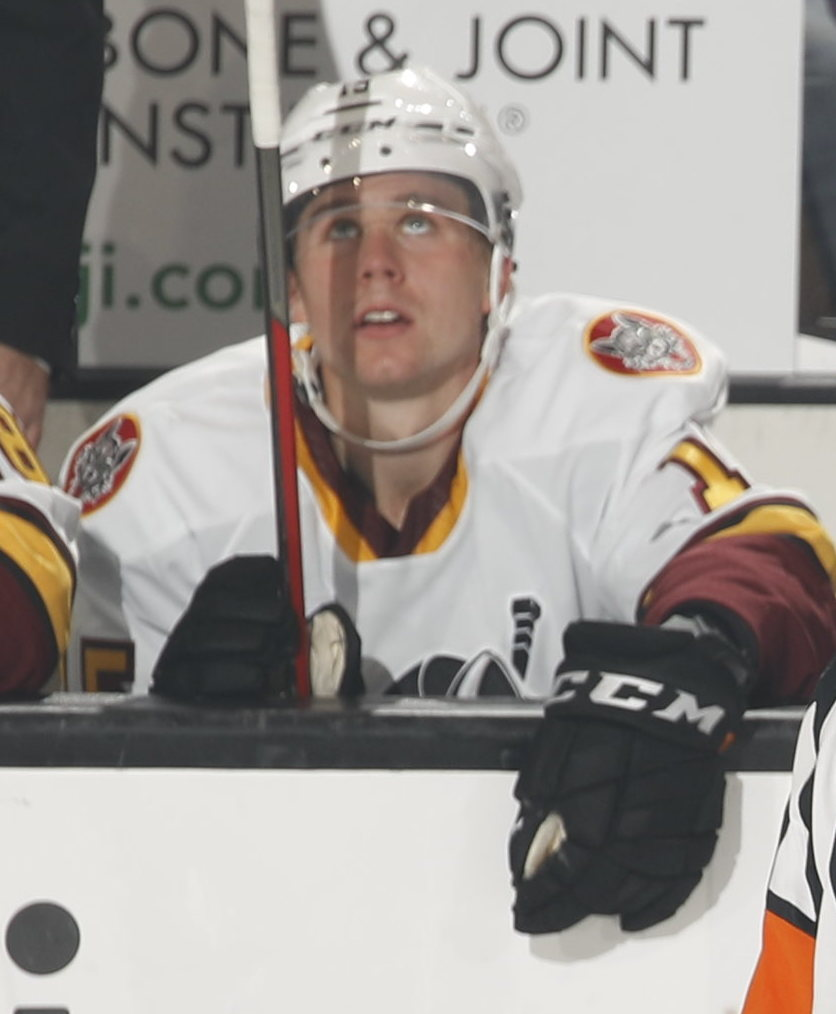
- Drury with the Chicago Wolves in 2021
- Born: February 3, 2000 (age 26) New York City, U.S.
- Height: 5 ft 11 in (180 cm)
- Weight: 186 lb (84 kg; 13 st 4 lb)
- Position: Center
- Shoots: Left
- NHL team Former teams: Nashville Predators; Växjö Lakers; Carolina Hurricanes; Colorado Avalanche
- National team: United States
- NHL draft: 42nd overall, 2018; Carolina Hurricanes
- Playing career: 2020–present

Jack Drury (born February 3, 2000) is an American professional ice hockey player who is a center and alternate captain for the Nashville Predators of the National Hockey League (NHL). Drury was selected 42nd overall by the Carolina Hurricanes in the 2018 NHL entry draft.

== Early years ==
Drury was born in New York City while his father, Ted, was playing for the New York Islanders. His family relocated to Wilmette, Illinois and then settled in Winnetka, Illinois. Drury attended Loyola Academy during his first two years of high school before attending Waterloo West High School after joining the Waterloo Black Hawks.

== Playing career ==
=== Amateur ===
Drury in his youth played for the Chicago Mission before joining the Waterloo Black Hawks of the United States Hockey League (USHL) before joining the Harvard Crimson men's ice hockey team. Following his sophomore season at Harvard, Drury was selected to the All-ECAC second team.

=== Professional ===
On June 24, 2018, Drury was selected by the Carolina Hurricanes with the 42nd overall pick in the 2018 NHL entry draft.

==== Växjö Lakers ====
In the 2020–21 season, with the ongoing COVID-19 pandemic affecting the commencement of the collegiate season, Drury opted to leave Harvard and signed a one-year deal with Swedish club, the Växjö Lakers of the Swedish Hockey League (SHL). In his first professional season, Drury registered 10 goals and 30 points in 41 regular season games and was named one of three finalists for the SHL's Rookie of the Year award. He continued his impressive play in the post-season, finishing second in the league with 11 points in 14 playoff games as Växjö Lakers won the Le Mat Trophy.

==== Carolina Hurricanes (2021–2025) ====
On July 8, 2021, Drury returned to North America in agreeing to a three-year, entry-level contract with his draft club, the Carolina Hurricanes.

During the 2024–25 season, on December 10, 2024, Drury suffered a broken thumb during a game against the San Jose Sharks and was subsequently put on IR, before being activated off of IR on January 3, 2025.

==== Colorado Avalanche (2025–2026) ====
On January 24, 2025, Drury, Martin Nečas, a 2025 second-round pick, and a 2026 fourth-round pick were traded by the Hurricanes to the Colorado Avalanche in a three-team deal involving the Chicago Blackhawks; the other sides of the deal included the Hurricanes receiving Mikko Rantanen and Taylor Hall, while the Blackhawks re-acquired their 2025 third-round pick from Carolina as compensation for retaining 50% of Rantanen's remaining contract.

==== Nashville Predators (2026–present) ====
On June 24, 2026, Drury, along with Chase Bradley and a 2029 third-round pick, was traded to the Nashville Predators in exchange for Zachary L'Heureux and Fedor Svechkov.

== Personal life ==
Drury's father, Ted, played for eight seasons in the National Hockey League. His uncle is former professional hockey player Chris Drury, who currently serves as general manager for the New York Rangers. Drury's mother, Liz Berkery Drury, played collegiate lacrosse at Harvard and helped the Crimson win an NCAA Championship in 1990. Both of his parents were inducted into the Harvard Athletics Hall of Fame in 2008. Drury also has three brothers, Owen, Teddy, and Ryan, and a sister, Lilly.

== Career statistics ==
=== Regular season and playoffs ===
			Regular season					Playoffs
Season	Team	League	GP	G	A	Pts	PIM	GP	G	A	Pts	PIM
2016–17	Waterloo Black Hawks	USHL	44	4	8	12	59	8	0	0	0	6
2017–18	Waterloo Black Hawks	USHL	56	24	41	65	83	8	3	2	5	4
2018–19	Harvard University	ECAC	32	9	15	24	14	—	—	—	—	—
2019–20	Harvard University	ECAC	28	20	19	39	16	—	—	—	—	—
2020–21	Växjö Lakers	SHL	41	10	20	30	18	14	5	6	11	4
2021–22	Chicago Wolves	AHL	68	20	32	52	61	18	9	15	24	10
2021–22	Carolina Hurricanes	NHL	2	2	0	2	2	—	—	—	—	—
2022–23	Chicago Wolves	AHL	37	11	13	24	23	—	—	—	—	—
2022–23	Carolina Hurricanes	NHL	38	2	6	8	14	13	0	3	3	10
2023–24	Carolina Hurricanes	NHL	74	8	19	27	33	11	1	4	5	2
2024–25	Carolina Hurricanes	NHL	39	3	6	9	12	—	—	—	—	—
2024–25	Colorado Avalanche	NHL	33	5	4	9	10	7	1	1	2	4
2025–26	Colorado Avalanche	NHL	82	10	17	27	31	13	3	2	5	4
SHL totals			41	10	20	30	18	14	5	6	11	4
NHL totals			268	30	52	82	102	44	5	10	15	20

=== International ===
Medal record

Representing United States

Men's ice hockey

World Championships
Bronze medal – third place	2021 Latvia	

Year	Team	Event	Result	GP	G	A	Pts	PIM
2017	United States	HGC	5th	4	2	3	5	12
2019	United States	WJC	2nd place, silver medalist(s)	7	0	0	0	0
2020	United States	WJC	6th	5	1	1	2	4
2021	United States	WC	3rd place, bronze medalist(s)	9	2	0	2	0
Junior totals				20	3	4	7	16
Senior totals				9	2	0	2	0

== Awards and honors ==
Award	Year	Ref
USHL
All-USHL Second Team	2018	
College
ECAC All-Rookie Team	2019	
ECAC Second All-Star Team	2020	
SHL
Le Mat Trophy champion	2021	
AHL
Calder Cup champion	2022	
