= Jackson Cates =

American ice hockey player (born 1997)

- Cates in 2026
- Born: September 28, 1997 (age 29) Stillwater, Minnesota, U.S.
- Height: 6 ft 0 in (183 cm)
- Weight: 190 lb (86 kg; 13 st 8 lb)
- Position: Center
- Shoots: Left
- DEL team Former teams: Nürnberg Ice Tigers; Philadelphia Flyers
- NHL draft: Undrafted
- Playing career: 2021–present

Jackson Cates (born September 28, 1997) is an American professional ice hockey center who is currently under contract with Nürnberg Ice Tigers in the Deutsche Eishockey Liga (DEL). He has previously played with the Philadelphia Flyers of the National Hockey League (NHL).

== Early life ==
Cates was born on September 28, 1997, in Stillwater, Minnesota. He played ice hockey for the Stillwater Area High School Ponies, a tenure which included two state tournament appearances in 2014 and 2016. His career totals of 57 goals and 63 assists, for a total of 120 points, was the highest in school history, and at the end of his senior year, Cates was given the Herb Brooks Award, bestowed annually on the state tournament player who best demonstrates the values and traits exemplified by Herb Brooks.

== Playing career ==
=== Amateur ===
Cates played junior ice hockey with the Waterloo Black Hawks of the United States Hockey League. He scored a hat trick with the team on January 28, 2018, in a 7–3 rout of the Cedar Rapids RoughRiders.

Cates originally committed to play hockey at Michigan Tech, but decided to sign a National Letter of Intent with the University of Minnesota Duluth in August 2017 so that he could play alongside his younger brother. In his junior season, Cates posted 27 points (11 goals and 16 assists) in 28 games with the Bulldogs.

=== Professional ===
On April 13, 2021, the Philadelphia Flyers of the National Hockey League (NHL) signed Cates as a college free agent to a two-year entry-level contract with an average annual value of $925,000. Due to COVID-19 restrictions, Cates was required to quarantine after arriving in Philadelphia before he could skate with the team. Cates made his NHL debut on April 23, 2021, in a game against the New York Rangers.

When Morgan Frost was placed in COVID-19 protocols on December 15, 2021, Cates was promoted to Philadelphia for their road game against the Montreal Canadiens. He scored his first NHL goal in that game, putting the Flyers up 2–1 in an eventual shootout loss.

On September 11, 2023, he was signed to a professional tryout (PTO) contract by the New York Islanders and spent time with the team during their preseason training camp. Released from his tryout with New York, he began the 2023–24 season on a PTO with AHL affiliate, the Bridgeport Islanders, on October 12. After scoring one goal in 12 games with the team, he was released from the PTO on December 7. He continued in the AHL, signing a PTO with the Rockford IceHogs, affiliate to the Chicago Blackhawks, on December 12, 2023.

As a free agent, Cates signed his first contract abroad in agreeing to a one-year contract with German club, Nürnberg Ice Tigers of the DEL, on August 7, 2026.

== Player profile ==
Scott Sandelin, Cates' coach at the University of Minnesota Duluth, referred to him as "a really smart skater who can make plays", and emphasized Cates' 200-foot game, power play, and penalty kill abilities.

== Personal life ==
Cates is the older brother of Noah Cates, who was selected by the Flyers in the fifth round of the 2017 NHL entry draft.

== Career statistics ==
| | | | Regular season | | | | | Playoffs |
| Season | Team | League | GP | G | A | Pts | PIM | GP | G | A | Pts | PIM |
|---|---|---|---|---|---|---|---|---|---|---|---|---|
| 2016–17 | Waterloo Black Hawks | USHL | 56 | 11 | 10 | 21 | 8 | 8 | 2 | 1 | 3 | 0 |
| 2017–18 | Waterloo Black Hawks | USHL | 57 | 33 | 30 | 63 | 18 | 8 | 2 | 2 | 4 | 2 |
| 2018–19 | Minnesota Duluth Bulldogs | NCHC | 39 | 8 | 6 | 14 | 14 | — | — | — | — | — |
| 2019–20 | Minnesota Duluth Bulldogs | NCHC | 29 | 8 | 15 | 23 | 6 | — | — | — | — | — |
| 2020–21 | Minnesota Duluth Bulldogs | NCHC | 28 | 11 | 16 | 27 | 4 | — | — | — | — | — |
| 2020–21 | Philadelphia Flyers | NHL | 4 | 0 | 1 | 1 | 0 | — | — | — | — | — |
| 2021–22 | Lehigh Valley Phantoms | AHL | 37 | 2 | 8 | 10 | 2 | — | — | — | — | — |
| 2021–22 | Philadelphia Flyers | NHL | 11 | 1 | 0 | 1 | 0 | — | — | — | — | — |
| 2022–23 | Philadelphia Flyers | NHL | 5 | 0 | 0 | 0 | 0 | — | — | — | — | — |
| 2022–23 | Lehigh Valley Phantoms | AHL | 65 | 11 | 12 | 23 | 18 | 1 | 0 | 0 | 0 | 0 |
| 2023–24 | Bridgeport Islanders | AHL | 12 | 1 | 0 | 1 | 6 | — | — | — | — | — |
| 2023–24 | Rockford IceHogs | AHL | 50 | 11 | 14 | 25 | 8 | 4 | 1 | 0 | 1 | 0 |
| 2024–25 | Rockford IceHogs | AHL | 64 | 9 | 7 | 16 | 24 | 7 | 1 | 1 | 2 | 2 |
| 2025–26 | Rockford IceHogs | AHL | 29 | 4 | 4 | 8 | 6 | — | — | — | — | — |
| NHL totals | | | 20 | 1 | 1 | 2 | 0 | — | — | — | — | — |
