= Ivan Prosvetov =

Russian ice hockey player (born 1999)

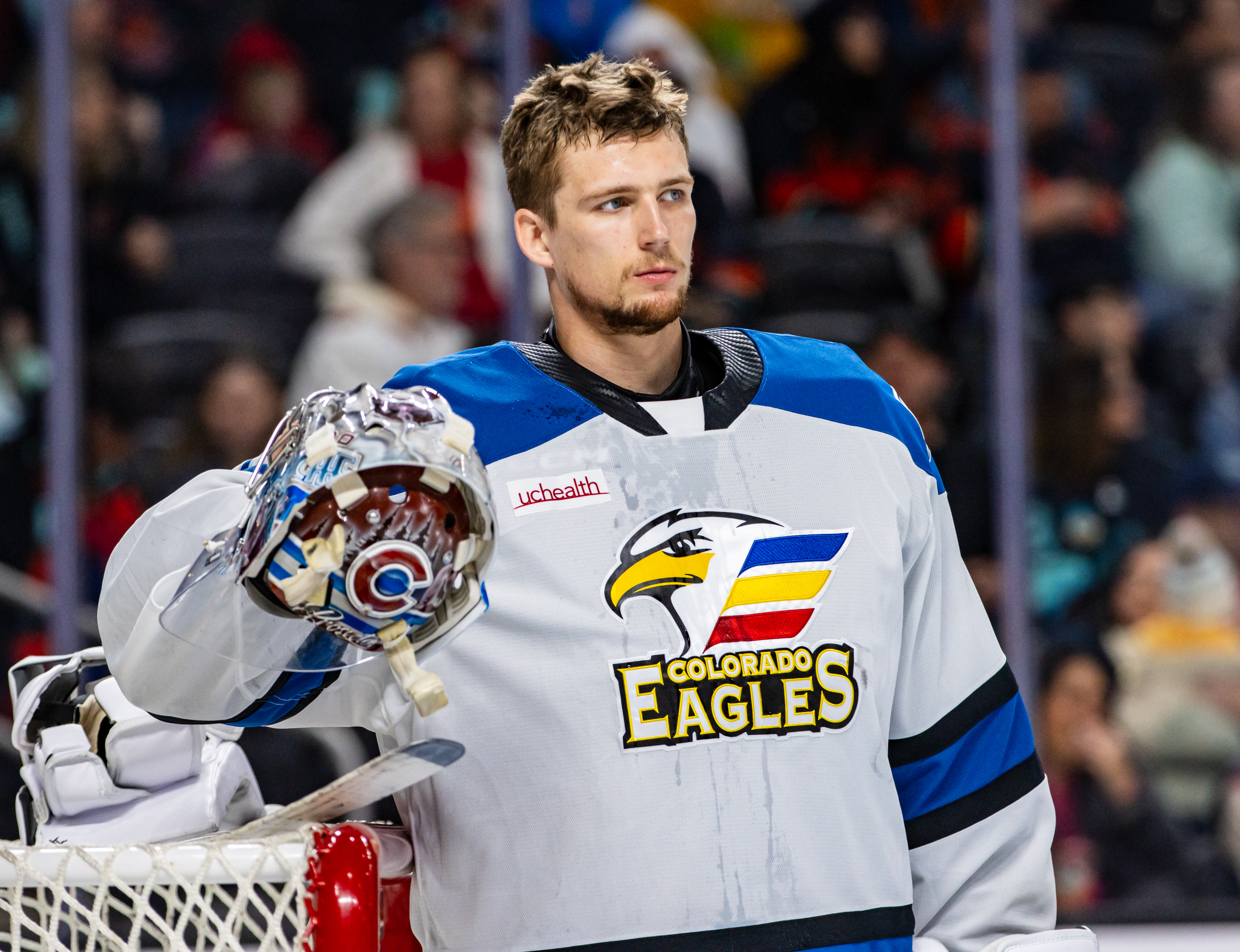
- Prosvetov with the Colorado Eagles in 2024
- Born: 5 March 1999 (age 27) Stupino, Russia
- Height: 6 ft 5 in (196 cm)
- Weight: 203 lb (92 kg; 14 st 7 lb)
- Position: Goaltender
- Catches: Left
- KHL team Former teams: Avangard Omsk; Arizona Coyotes; Colorado Avalanche; CSKA Moscow
- NHL draft: 114th overall, 2018; Arizona Coyotes
- Playing career: 2019–present

Ivan Igorevich Prosvetov (Russian: Иван Игоревич Просветов; born 5 March 1999) is a Russian professional ice hockey goaltender for Avangard Omsk of the Kontinental Hockey League (KHL). Prosvetov was selected by the Arizona Coyotes, 114th overall, in the 2018 NHL entry draft.

== Playing career ==
=== Amateur ===
Upon moving to North America, Prosvetov played one season for the Minnesota Magicians in the North American Hockey League (NAHL). During his 2016–17 campaign, he ranked second in the league in games played with 44 and posted a 21–15–4 record with a 2.52 goals against average and .928 save percentage. As such, he participated in the 2017 NAHL Top Prospects Tournament. The following season, Prosvetov joined the Youngstown Phantoms in the United States Hockey League (USHL) for his 2017–18 campaign. He played in 36 regular season games with the Phantoms and posted a 2.90 goals against average and a .913 save percentage. As a result of his impressive performance in the regular season, Prosvetov was selected to play in the 2018 CHL/NHL Top Prospects Game. On February 19, Prosvetov was recognized as the USHL Goaltender of the Week after he blocked 61 shots on net over two games. In the playoffs, Prosvetov improved to a 2.58 goals against average and a .921 save percentage. He helped them reach the 2018 Clark Cup Final by posting a 7–3–0 record over 11 playoff games.

Leading up to the 2018 NHL entry draft, Prosvetov was ranked 14th among North American goaltenders by the NHL Central Scouting Bureau. He was eventually drafted in the fourth round, 114th overall, by the Arizona Coyotes. While attending their development camp in late June, Prosvetov was drafted 15th overall by the Saginaw Spirit in the 2018 CHL Import Draft. Following the Coyotes' development camp, Prosvetov signed a Standard Player Agreement to play with the Spirit in 2018–19. Prosvetov made an immediate impact with the Spirit during his rookie campaign. By January, he had compiled a 20–6–1–0 record with a 3.07 goals-against-average and .902 save percentage. He finished the regular season with a 2.94 goals-against average and .910 save percentage to help lead the Spirit to their second division title in franchise history. During his regular season run, Prosvetov went viral for his postgame celebration in which he somersaulted his way to center ice and cartwheeled in the crease. Prosvetov maintained an 8–2–0 record over the Spirits' first two rounds of the playoffs as they qualified for the Western Conference final. During Western Conference final series against the Guelph Storm, Prosvetov was suspended for five games after he batted a puck into the spectator area at a stoppage of play. Although he was eligible to return for Game 7, Prosvetov served as a backup for Tristan Lennox. The Spirit would fall to Guelph in Game 7 with a 3–2 loss. In spite of the suspension, Prosvetov was named to the OHL's Third Team All-Stars at the end of the season.

=== Professional ===
==== Arizona Coyotes ====
Following the 2018–19 season, Prosvetov signed a three-year, entry-level contract with the Coyotes on 1 July 2019. After attending the Coyotes training camp, he was assigned to the Coyotes' American Hockey League (AHL) affiliate, the Tucson Roadrunners, for the 2019–20 season. In his first four games for the Roadrunners, he maintained a 3–1–0 record with a 1.98 goals against average (GAA) and .944 save percentage (SV%). On 8 November, Prosvetov was assigned to the Coyotes' ECHL affiliate, the Rapid City Rush. He appeared in five games for the Rush, posting a 4–1–0–0 record with his first professional shutout and 2.40 GAA and .930 SV%, before returning to the AHL. Upon rejoining the AHL, Prosvetov continued his winning streak and posted a 7–1–0 record with a 1.97 GAA and .944 SV% through eight AHL games. By late December, Prosvetov led the league with 1.88 GAA and .946 SV% while touting a 9–1–0 record. He earned his first AHL shutout on 22 December to help the Roadrunners extend their longest winning streak in franchise history to eight games. In recognition of his efforts, Prosvetov earned his first NHL call-up on 5 January 2020. At the time, he had improved to an 11–3–0 record with an 2.38 GAA and .931 SV%. Although he was called up numerous times in January, he did not make his NHL debut during these callups. When the AHL was paused due to the COVID-19 pandemic, the Roadrunners were holding onto first place in the Pacific Division.

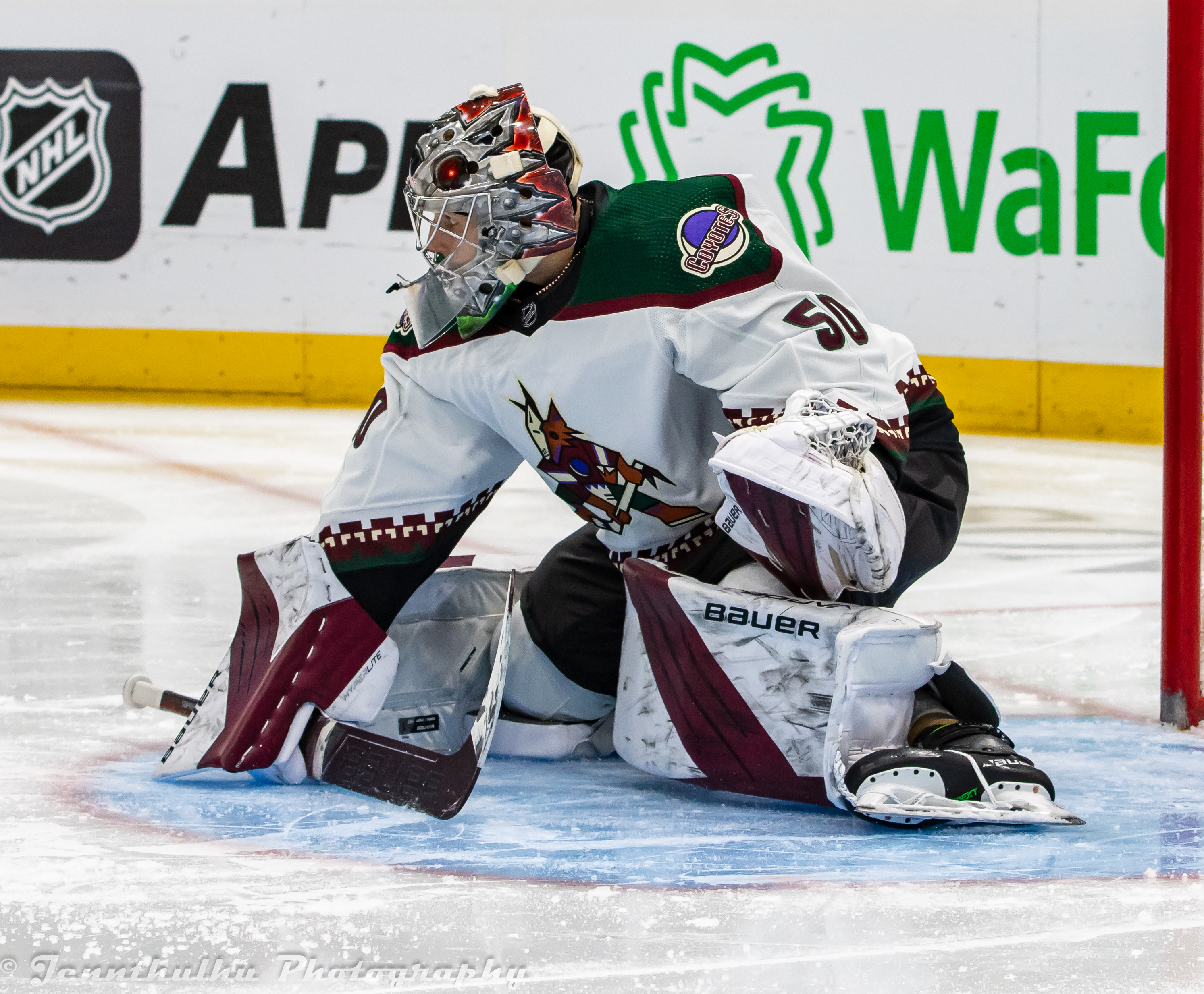
Prosvetov during a game in 2023.

Prosvetov made his NHL debut on 31 March 2021, in relief of Adin Hill who had surrendered four goals on 10 shots in the first period. Prosvetov made 23 saves in 53:38 minutes of action as the Coyotes fell 9–3 to the Colorado Avalanche. He played three games for the Coyotes during the 2021–22 season, maintaining a 4.22 GAA and an .875 SV%. On 24 May 2022, Prosvetov signed a one-year contract extension to remain with the Coyotes organization.

In the first year of his new contract, Prosvetov returned to the Roadrunners to start the 2022–23 season. He maintained a 2–0–0 record to help the Roadrunners yield a 3–1–0–0 record start to the season. Despite his hot start, Prosvetov struggled from November 2022 to January 2023, and gave up four or more goals nine times of 16 starts. However, he began to improve in mid-January and by February, Prosvetov had a 15–13–2 record with a .898 SV% and 3.14 GAA. By early March, Prosvetov had a career-high 16 wins and an active five-game unbeaten streak. On 9 March, Prosvetov was recalled to the NHL level and made 39 saves that night against the Nashville Predators to earn his first NHL win.

==== Colorado Avalanche ====
After participating in training camp and pre-season, Prosvetov was placed on waivers approaching the 2023–24 season. He was claimed the following day by the Colorado Avalanche on 9 October 2023, joining the club as a cover for injured backup goaltender Pavel Francouz. Remaining on the opening season roster, Prosvetov made his debut with the Avalanche appearing in relief of Alexandar Georgiev in a 4–0 defeat to the Pittsburgh Penguins on 26 October. He made his first start for the Avalanche, recording 28 saves and his first win in a 4–1 victory over the St. Louis Blues on 1 November. Following his fourth appearance, adding reliable support to Georgiev, Prosvetov effectively secured his backup role with the team after the announcement that Pavel Francouz was to miss the entirety of season through injury. Prosvetov made 11 appearances with the Avalanche, collecting four wins, before his role was minimised. Having played sparingly Prosvetov was placed on waivers and upon clearing was assigned to AHL affiliate, the Colorado Eagles, following the NHL All-Star break on 4 February 2024. Prosvetov began his tenure with the Eagles in dominant fashion, registering 8 straight wins and earning player of the week accolades and also selected as the goaltender of the month for February. He remained with the Eagles for the remainder of the campaign, before returning to the Avalanche to serve as a black ace during the playoffs.

==== CSKA Moscow ====
As a group IV free agent from the Avalanche, Prosvetov was initially reported to have signed a three-year contract to return to his homeland as the starting goaltender with perennially contending club, HC CSKA Moscow of the Kontinental Hockey League (KHL), on 19 April 2024. His agreement with the club was belatedly announced officially on 1 August 2024. In the 2024–25 season, Prosvetov enjoyed a successful campaign backstopping CSKA by posting a 2.32 goals-against average, a .920 save-percentage along with four shutouts and a 20 win record in 34 appearances. He would earn KHL Goalie of the Month honors in November after posting five wins along with three shutouts. In a first round series loss, Prosvetov made five playoff appearances for his club, where he recorded a .918 save-percentage and a 2.90 goals-against average.

==== Calgary Flames ====
With aspirations to return to the NHL, on 1 July 2025, Prosvetov was signed to a one-year, $950,000 contract with the Calgary Flames for the 2025–26 season. Prosvetov was assigned by Calgary to join AHL affiliate, the Calgary Wranglers, in collecting 9 wins through 25 regular season appearances, he was unable to earn a recall to the Flames.

==== Avangard Omsk ====
As a free agent from the Flames at the conclusion of his contract, Prosvetov familiarly returned to Russia, joining Avangard Osmk of the KHL on a one-year contract on 16 July 2026.

== Career statistics ==
			Regular season									Playoffs
Season	Team	League	GP	W	L	OT	MIN	GA	SO	GAA	SV%	GP	W	L	MIN	GA	SO	GAA	SV%
2016–17	Minnesota Magicians	NAHL	44	22	15	3	2,453	103	0	2.52	.928	3	0	3	138	8	0	3.47	.877
2017–18	Youngstown Phantoms	USHL	36	19	9	1	1,968	95	0	2.90	.913	11	7	3	651	28	1	2.58	.921
2018–19	Saginaw Spirit	OHL	53	36	11	1	2,996	147	4	2.94	.910	12	9	2	707	28	1	2.38	.930
2019–20	Tucson Roadrunners	AHL	27	14	10	1	1,581	76	1	2.88	.909	—	—	—	—	—	—	—	—
2019–20	Rapid City Rush	ECHL	5	4	1	0	300	12	1	2.40	.930	—	—	—	—	—	—	—	—
2020–21	Tucson Roadrunners	AHL	18	9	9	0	1,068	63	0	3.54	.895	1	0	1	58	2	0	2.07	.900
2020–21	Arizona Coyotes	NHL	3	0	1	0	131	9	0	4.15	.824	—	—	—	—	—	—	—	—
2021–22	Tucson Roadrunners	AHL	45	15	22	5	2,474	151	2	3.66	.880	—	—	—	—	—	—	—	—
2021–22	Arizona Coyotes	NHL	3	0	2	1	185	13	0	4.22	.875	—	—	—	—	—	—	—	—
2022–23	Tucson Roadrunners	AHL	35	16	13	4	2,037	104	1	3.06	.900	3	1	2	125	11	0	5.27	.845
2022–23	Arizona Coyotes	NHL	7	4	3	0	423	28	0	3.98	.880	—	—	—	—	—	—	—	—
2023–24	Colorado Avalanche	NHL	11	4	3	1	494	26	0	3.16	.895	—	—	—	—	—	—	—	—
2023–24	Colorado Eagles	AHL	21	11	7	2	1,211	47	2	2.33	.921	3	1	2	191	9	0	2.83	.889
2024–25	CSKA Moscow	KHL	38	20	16	2	2,142	83	4	2.32	.920	5	2	3	248	12	0	2.90	.918
2025–26	Calgary Wranglers	AHL	25	9	12	2	1,404	88	1	3.76	.887	—	—	—	—	—	—	—	—
NHL totals			24	8	9	2	1,232	76	0	3.70	.881	—	—	—	—	—	—	—	—
KHL totals			38	20	16	2	2,142	83	4	2.32	.920	5	2	3	248	12	0	2.90	.918

== Awards and honours ==
Award	Year	Ref
OHL
Third All-Star Team	2019	
