= Alex Steeves =

American ice hockey player (born 1999)

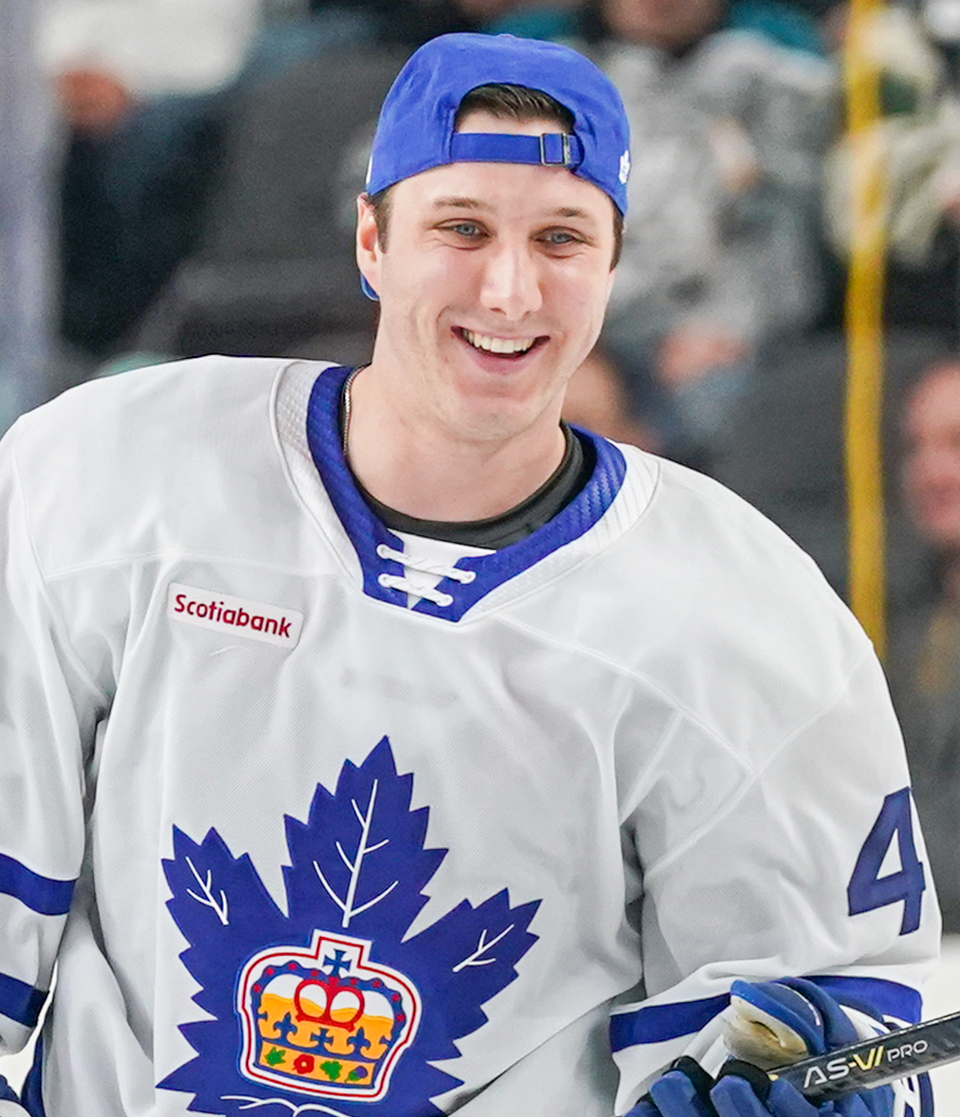
- Steeves with the Toronto Marlies in 2024
- Born: December 10, 1999 (age 26) St. Paul, Minnesota, U.S.
- Height: 6 ft 0 in (183 cm)
- Weight: 199 lb (90 kg; 14 st 3 lb)
- Position: Forward
- Shoots: Left
- NHL team (P) Cur. team Former teams: Boston Bruins; Providence Bruins (AHL); Toronto Maple Leafs
- National team: United States
- NHL draft: Undrafted
- Playing career: 2021–present

Alexander Richard Steeves (born December 10, 1999) is an American professional ice hockey player who is a forward for the Providence Bruins in the American Hockey League (AHL) while under contract to the Boston Bruins of the National Hockey League (NHL).

== Early life ==
Steeves was born on December 10, 1999, in St. Paul, Minnesota to parents Alison and Glen Steeves. Steeves and his brothers were born in St. Paul before the family moved to New Hampshire so their father could complete his residency. Steeves spent his formative years in New Hampshire where his Canadian-born parents encouraged him to play ice hockey. His father played in the Western Hockey League and spent four years playing hockey at the University of Manitoba. As a result, Steeves described himself as being "literally born with hockey in my blood."

== Playing career ==
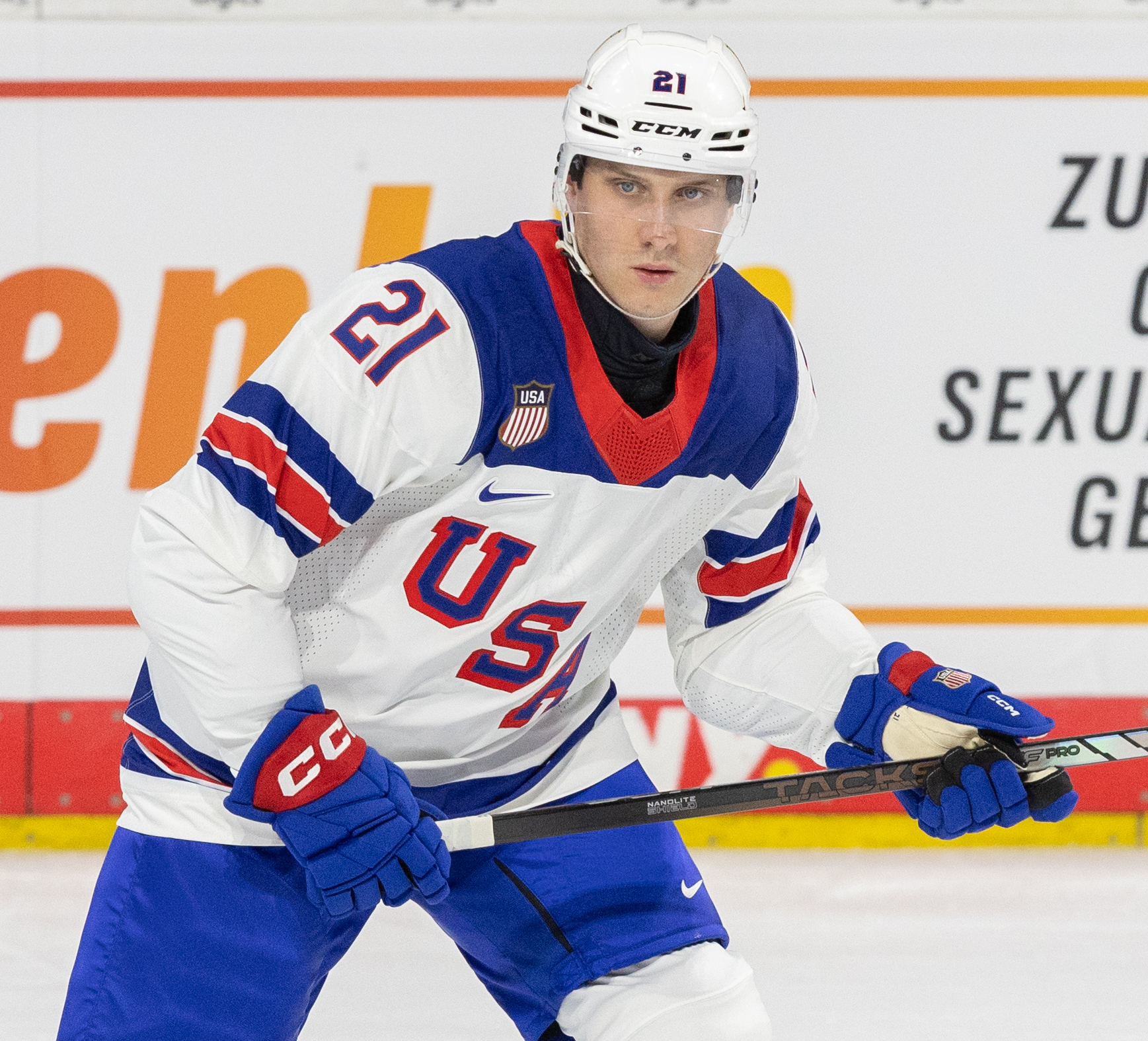
Steeves with Team USA in 2026

Growing up in New Hampshire, Steeves played for the Manchester Jr. Monarchs 16U, New Hampshire Jr. Monarchs 18U, and the EHL New Hampshire Jr. Monarchs.

Steeves made his United States Hockey League (USHL) debut in the 2015-16 season with the Sioux City Musketeers, recording 5 goals and 6 assists in 39 games. During the season, he announced his commitment to the University of Notre Dame. Steeves joined the Dubuque Fighting Saints for the 2016–17 season. After being passed over in the NHL entry draft following his second season with the Fighting Saints, Steeves began playing for the Notre Dame Fighting Irish in the 2018–19 season.

=== Toronto Maple Leafs ===
On March 28, 2021, the Toronto Maple Leafs signed him to a three-year, entry-level contract.

Steeves made his NHL debut on December 7, 2021 against the Columbus Blue Jackets. He recorded his first NHL point in his third game on December 11, picking up an assist on a goal scored by teammate Pierre Engvall in a 5–4 win over the Chicago Blackhawks. Steeves would spend the majority of his first professional season with the Toronto Marlies of the American Hockey League (AHL), the Maple Leafs' top tier affiliate club. Steeves would score 23 goals, the second most in franchise history for a rookie (tying Josh Leivo). Steeves was in a race with teammate and fellow rookie Bobby McMann for the second half of the season for the franchise rookie scoring title; McMann would ultimately score 24 goals to assume the record.

Steeves attended the Maple Leafs' 2023 training camp, but was assigned to the Marlies to start the 2023–24 season.

On August 21, 2024, the Maple Leafs re-signed Steeves to a one-year, two-way contract worth $775,000. He appeared in seven games with the Maple Leafs in the 2024–25 season, and on February 22 he scored his first career NHL goal in a 6–3 win against the Carolina Hurricanes. Steeves spent the bulk of the season playing with the Marlies, and was named a 2024–25 AHL Second Team All-Star.

=== Boston Bruins ===
Leaving the Maple Leafs as a free agent after four seasons, Steeves was signed to a one-year, $850,000 contract with the Boston Bruins for the 2025–26 season on July 1, 2025.

== Career statistics ==
			Regular season					Playoffs
Season	Team	League	GP	G	A	Pts	PIM	GP	G	A	Pts	PIM
2015–16	New Hampshire Jr. Monarchs	EHL	4	2	4	6	0	—	—	—	—	—
2015–16	Sioux City Musketeers	USHL	39	5	6	11	16	—	—	—	—	—
2016–17	Dubuque Fighting Saints	USHL	53	6	12	18	33	8	1	3	4	17
2017–18	Dubuque Fighting Saints	USHL	55	20	37	57	28	5	2	4	6	0
2018–19	Notre Dame	B1G	39	7	2	9	10	—	—	—	—	—
2019–20	Notre Dame	B1G	36	11	17	28	10	—	—	—	—	—
2020–21	Notre Dame	B1G	29	15	17	32	8	—	—	—	—	—
2021–22	Toronto Marlies	AHL	58	23	23	46	37	—	—	—	—	—
2021–22	Toronto Maple Leafs	NHL	3	0	1	1	0	—	—	—	—	—
2022–23	Toronto Marlies	AHL	65	19	32	51	28	7	1	4	5	0
2022–23	Toronto Maple Leafs	NHL	3	0	0	0	0	—	—	—	—	—
2023–24	Toronto Marlies	AHL	65	27	30	57	26	3	0	0	0	2
2023–24	Toronto Maple Leafs	NHL	1	0	0	0	0	—	—	—	—	—
2024–25	Toronto Marlies	AHL	59	36	26	62	50	2	2	0	2	2
2024–25	Toronto Maple Leafs	NHL	7	1	1	2	0	—	—	—	—	—
2025–26	Providence Bruins	AHL	9	3	5	8	2	—	—	—	—	—
2025–26	Boston Bruins	NHL	43	9	7	16	34	2	0	0	0	0
NHL totals			57	10	9	19	34	2	0	0	0	0

=== International ===
Year	Team	Event	Result	GP	G	A	Pts	PIM
2026	United States	WC	8th	8	1	2	3	0
Senior totals				8	1	2	3	0

== Awards and honours ==
Award	Year
USHL
All-Academic Team	2018
Scholar-Athlete Award	2018
College
B1G Second All-Star Team	2021
AHL
Second All-Star Team	2025
