= Nolan Moyle =

American ice hockey player

- Born: April 13, 1999 (age 27) Santa Monica, California, U.S.
- Height: 6 ft 2 in (188 cm)
- Weight: 198 lb (90 kg; 14 st 2 lb)
- Position: Right wing
- Shoots: Right
- AHL team (P) Cur. team Former teams: Grand Rapids Griffins; Toledo Walleye (ECHL); Kunlun Red Star; EC KAC
- Playing career: 2023–present

Nolan Moyle (born April 13, 1999) is an American professional ice hockey right wing for the Toledo Walleye of the ECHL while under contract to the Grand Rapids Griffins of the American Hockey League (AHL). He previously played for the Kunlun Red Star of the Kontinental Hockey League (KHL). He played college ice hockey at Michigan.

== Playing career ==
=== Junior ===
Moyle was drafted 117th overall by the Green Bay Gamblers in the 2016 USHL Phase II draft. During the 2016–17 season, he recorded five goals and 10 assists in 59 games for the Gamblers. He competed at the 2017 USHL/NHL Top Prospects Game. During the 2017–18 season, he recorded 19 goals and 26 assists in 57 games for the Gamblers. During the Clark Cup playoffs, he recorded one goal and one assist in two games.

=== College ===
Moyle was originally committed to play college ice hockey at Michigan State, before switching his commitment to Michigan. Moyle began his collegiate career for the Wolverines during the 2018–19 season. During his freshman season, he recorded seven goals and three assists in 30 games. During the 2019–20 season in his sophomore year, he recorded three goals and four assists in 33 games. During the 2020–21 season in his junior year, he recorded four goals and three assists in 25 games.

On September 16, 2021, Moyle was named alternate captain for the 2021–22 season. During his senior year, he recorded seven goals and eight assists in 36 games, and helped Michigan win the 2022 Big Ten men's ice hockey tournament and advanced to the Frozen Four at the 2022 NCAA Division I men's ice hockey tournament, where they were eliminated by eventual tournament champion Denver. He finished the NCAA tournament on a three-game point streak.

Following his senior year, he entered the NCAA transfer portal, however, he withdrew his name and returned to Michigan. On September 6, 2022, Moyle was named team captain for the 2022–23 season. The Wolverine's 2022–23 team was the youngest in the NCAA, and featured 12 freshman. In his fifth-year senior season, he recorded three goals and four assists in 40 games, and helped Michigan win the 2023 Big Ten men's ice hockey tournament and advanced to the Frozen Four at the 2023 NCAA Division I men's ice hockey tournament for the second consecutive year, where they were eliminated by eventual tournament champion Quinnipiac.

=== Professional ===
On July 20, 2023, Moyle signed a two-year contract with Kunlun Red Star of the KHL. He scored his first professional goal on September 6, 2023, in a game against HC Dinamo Minsk. During the 2023–24 season, he recorded four goals and seven assists in 55 games. He began the 2024–25 season with the Red Star and recorded one goal and one assist in 12 games.

On January 19, 2025, Moyle signed with the Toledo Walleye of the ECHL. During the 2024–25 season, he recorded six goals and nine assists in 32 regular season games and five assists in 20 games during the 2025 Kelly Cup playoffs, as the Walleye advanced to the Kelly Cup finals. He began the 2025–26 season with Toledo and recorded five goals and five assists in nine games. On November 11, 2025, he signed a professional tryout (PTO) with the Grand Rapids Griffins of the AHL. Moyle featured in 16 games with the Griffins before concluding his try-out and returning abroad for the remainder of the season with Austrian club, EC KAC of the ICE Hockey League.

As a free agent in the off-season, Moyle returned to the Grand Rapids Griffins in signing a one-year AHL contract for the 2026–27 season on July 10, 2026.

== Personal life ==
Moyle was born to Henry and Theresa Moyle. His mother swam on the UCLA Bruins swimming team.

== Career statistics ==
| | | | Regular season | | | | | Playoffs |
| Season | Team | League | GP | G | A | Pts | PIM | GP | G | A | Pts | PIM |
|---|---|---|---|---|---|---|---|---|---|---|---|---|
| 2016–17 | Green Bay Gamblers | USHL | 59 | 5 | 10 | 15 | 14 | — | — | — | — | — |
| 2017–18 | Green Bay Gamblers | USHL | 57 | 19 | 26 | 45 | 22 | 2 | 1 | 1 | 2 | 0 |
| 2018–19 | University of Michigan | B1G | 30 | 7 | 3 | 10 | 30 | — | — | — | — | — |
| 2019–20 | University of Michigan | B1G | 33 | 3 | 4 | 7 | 8 | — | — | — | — | — |
| 2020–21 | University of Michigan | B1G | 25 | 4 | 3 | 7 | 33 | — | — | — | — | — |
| 2021–22 | University of Michigan | B1G | 36 | 7 | 8 | 15 | 49 | — | — | — | — | — |
| 2022–23 | University of Michigan | B1G | 40 | 3 | 4 | 7 | 36 | — | — | — | — | — |
| 2023–24 | Kunlun Red Star | KHL | 55 | 4 | 7 | 11 | 37 | — | — | — | — | — |
| 2024–25 | Kunlun Red Star | KHL | 12 | 1 | 1 | 2 | 0 | — | — | — | — | — |
| 2024–25 | Toledo Walleye | ECHL | 32 | 6 | 9 | 15 | 20 | 20 | 0 | 5 | 5 | 8 |
| 2025–26 | Toledo Walleye | ECHL | 9 | 5 | 5 | 10 | 4 | — | — | — | — | — |
| 2025–26 | Grand Rapids Griffins | AHL | 16 | 1 | 1 | 2 | 15 | — | — | — | — | — |
| 2025–26 | EC KAC | ICEHL | 6 | 1 | 7 | 8 | 10 | 6 | 1 | 0 | 1 | 2 |
| KHL totals | | | 67 | 5 | 8 | 13 | 37 | — | — | — | — | — |
