= Paul Cotter =

American ice hockey player (born 1999)

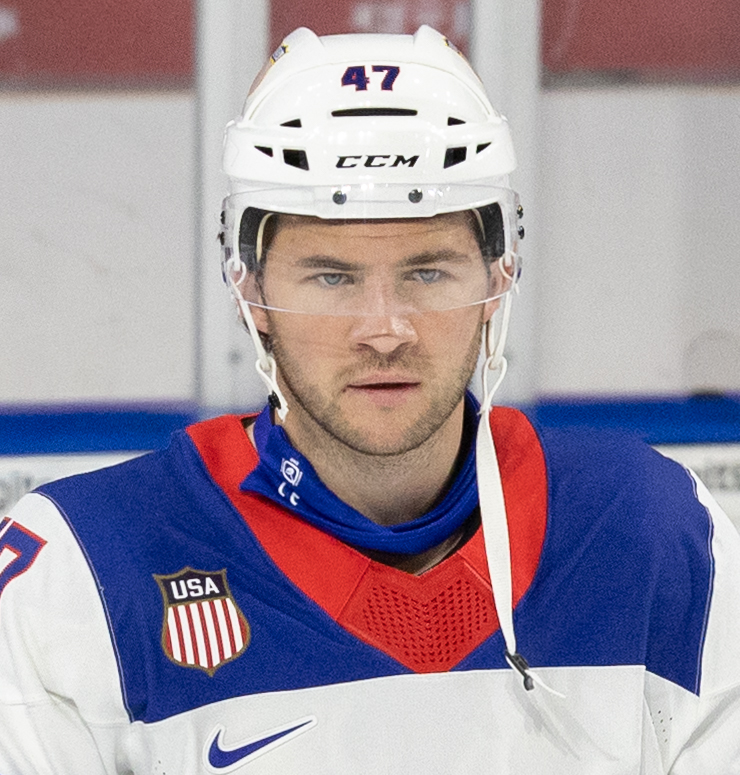
- Cotter with the United States in 2026
- Born: November 16, 1999 (age 26) Canton, Michigan, U.S.
- Height: 6 ft 2 in (188 cm)
- Weight: 213 lb (97 kg; 15 st 3 lb)
- Position: Forward
- Shoots: Left
- NHL team Former teams: Vancouver Canucks; Vegas Golden Knights; New Jersey Devils
- National team: United States
- NHL draft: 115th overall, 2018; Vegas Golden Knights
- Playing career: 2019–present

Paul Cotter (born November 16, 1999) is an American professional ice hockey player who is a forward for the Vancouver Canucks of the National Hockey League (NHL). He previously played for the Vegas Golden Knights, who drafted him in 2018 and with whom he won the Stanley Cup in 2023, and the New Jersey Devils.

== Playing career ==
After playing his draft-eligible season with the Lincoln Stars of the United States Hockey League (USHL) and recording 18 goals and 39 points in 51 games, Cotter was selected in the fourth round, 115th overall, by the Vegas Golden Knights at the 2018 NHL entry draft.

Although Cotter began the 2018–19 season with Western Michigan University, he left in November 2018 after appearing in eight games and signed with the London Knights of the Ontario Hockey League (OHL), in part because he believed going the major junior route would help him secure an entry-level contract with Vegas. He recorded just one point in his college hockey career, an assist.

During the 2021–22 season, Cotter was recalled by the Golden Knights and made his NHL debut on November 9, 2021, against the Seattle Kraken. In a 3–2 victory on November 11, he scored his first NHL goal against Cam Talbot of the Minnesota Wild.

Cotter, as a rookie, spent the entire 2022–23 season, on Vegas' roster, ultimately playing 55 regular-season games and recording 13 goals. Vegas would go on to win the Stanley Cup Final; although Cotter did not play any playoff games, he automatically qualified for inscription on the Stanley Cup by playing in over half of Vegas' 82 regular-season games.

On June 29, 2024, Cotter was traded by the Golden Knights to the New Jersey Devils in exchange for Alexander Holtz and Akira Schmid.

On July 1, 2026, Cotter signed a one-year, $2.15 million contract with the Vancouver Canucks. In his Canucks debut on September 29, Cotter scored twice, including the overtime-winning goal, in a 6–5 victory over the Edmonton Oilers. He scored twice more and added two assists in his next three games, which earned him the league's third star of the week ending October 4.

== Career statistics ==
=== Regular season and playoffs ===
			Regular season					Playoffs
Season	Team	League	GP	G	A	Pts	PIM	GP	G	A	Pts	PIM
2016–17	Brookings Blizzard	NAHL	59	28	32	60	103	5	0	2	2	0
2017–18	Lincoln Stars	USHL	51	18	21	39	64	7	4	4	8	8
2018–19	Western Michigan University	NCHC	8	0	1	1	2	—	—	—	—	—
2018–19	London Knights	OHL	48	9	17	26	25	11	0	0	0	2
2019–20	Chicago Wolves	AHL	56	4	5	9	24	—	—	—	—	—
2020–21	Henderson Silver Knights	AHL	38	5	11	16	18	4	0	1	1	4
2021–22	Henderson Silver Knights	AHL	59	20	15	35	62	2	1	1	2	0
2021–22	Vegas Golden Knights	NHL	7	2	0	2	6	—	—	—	—	—
2022–23	Vegas Golden Knights	NHL	55	13	5	18	15	—	—	—	—	—
2023–24	Vegas Golden Knights	NHL	76	7	18	25	41	—	—	—	—	—
2024–25	New Jersey Devils	NHL	79	16	6	22	62	5	0	1	1	2
2025–26	New Jersey Devils	NHL	79	9	6	15	19	—	—	—	—	—
NHL totals			296	47	35	82	143	5	0	1	1	2

=== International ===
Year	Team	Event	Result	GP	G	A	Pts	PIM
2026	United States	WC	8th	8	2	2	4	2
Senior totals				8	2	2	4	2

== Awards and honors ==
Award	Year	Ref
NAHL
Central Forward of the Year	2017	
Central MVP	2017	
All-Central Division Rookie Team	2017	
All-Central Division Team	2017	
All-Rookie First Team	2017	
First All-Star Team	2017	
Rookie of the Year	2017	
USHL
All-Rookie Team	2018	
NHL
Stanley Cup champion	2023	
