= 2017–18 USHL season =

2017–18 USHL Season
- League: United States Hockey League
- Sport: Ice hockey
- Duration: October 6, 2017 – April 14, 2018
- Games: 60
- Teams: 17

Draft
- Top draft pick: Graham Slaggert
- Picked by: Cedar Rapids RoughRiders

Regular season
- Anderson Cup: Waterloo Black Hawks
- Season MVP: Anthony Del Gaizo (Muskegon Lumberjacks)
- Top scorer: Anthony Del Gaizo (Muskegon Lumberjacks)

Clark Cup Playoffs
- Clark Cup Playoffs MVP: Griffin Loughran (Force)
- Finals champions: Fargo Force
- Runners-up: Youngstown Phantoms

USHL seasons
- 2016–17 2018–19

The 2017–18 USHL season was the 39th season of the United States Hockey League as an all-junior league. The regular season ran from October 6, 2017, to April 14, 2018. The regular season champions, the Waterloo Black Hawks, were awarded the Anderson Cup. The playoff champions, the Fargo Force, were awarded the Clark Cup.

== League changes ==
The Bloomington Thunder were rebranded as the Central Illinois Flying Aces.

While the alignment remained the same from the previous season, the league increased the number of teams that qualify for the playoffs from eight to twelve. The top two seeds in each conference now have a bye in the first round. The third and fourth conference seeds than host the fifth and sixth conference seeds in a best-of-three series. The rest of the playoffs are a best-of-five series.

== Regular season ==
Final standings:

=== Eastern Conference ===
| Team | GP | W | L | OTL | SOL | PTS | GF | GA | PIM |
|---|---|---|---|---|---|---|---|---|---|
| y – Team USA | 60 | 41 | 18 | 0 | 1 | 83 | 295 | 211 | 739 |
| x – Youngstown Phantoms | 60 | 33 | 20 | 5 | 2 | 73 | 180 | 189 | 976 |
| x – Muskegon Lumberjacks | 60 | 33 | 25 | 1 | 1 | 68 | 202 | 206 | 1131 |
| x – Green Bay Gamblers | 60 | 30 | 24 | 4 | 2 | 66 | 172 | 170 | 1019 |
| x – Dubuque Fighting Saints | 60 | 26 | 21 | 10 | 3 | 65 | 179 | 194 | 606 |
| x – Chicago Steel | 60 | 28 | 25 | 2 | 5 | 63 | 219 | 218 | 907 |
| Cedar Rapids RoughRiders | 60 | 26 | 24 | 8 | 2 | 62 | 179 | 198 | 933 |
| Madison Capitols | 60 | 23 | 33 | 2 | 2 | 50 | 183 | 224 | 755 |
| Central Illinois Flying Aces | 60 | 14 | 39 | 3 | 4 | 35 | 161 | 258 | 928 |

=== Western Conference ===
| Team | GP | W | L | OTL | SOL | PTS | GF | GA | PIM |
|---|---|---|---|---|---|---|---|---|---|
| y – Waterloo Black Hawks | 60 | 38 | 14 | 6 | 2 | 84 | 199 | 150 | 1017 |
| x – Omaha Lancers | 60 | 39 | 16 | 2 | 3 | 83 | 192 | 143 | 996 |
| x – Fargo Force | 60 | 37 | 16 | 3 | 4 | 81 | 208 | 133 | 985 |
| x – Sioux Falls Stampede | 60 | 32 | 19 | 4 | 5 | 73 | 187 | 181 | 1018 |
| x – Lincoln Stars | 60 | 35 | 23 | 1 | 1 | 72 | 197 | 168 | 1260 |
| x – Tri-City Storm | 60 | 29 | 27 | 2 | 2 | 62 | 137 | 155 | 967 |
| Sioux City Musketeers | 60 | 26 | 26 | 4 | 4 | 60 | 159 | 197 | 981 |
| Des Moines Buccaneers | 60 | 20 | 33 | 4 | 3 | 47 | 145 | 199 | 796 |

x = clinched playoff berth; y = clinched conference title; z = clinched regular season title

== Statistical leaders ==
=== Scoring leaders ===
Players are listed by points, then goals.

Note: GP = Games played; G = Goals; A = Assists; Pts. = Points; PIM = Penalty minutes

| Player | Team | GP | G | A | Pts | PIM |
| Anthony Del Gaizo | Muskegon Lumberjacks | 60 | 40 | 32 | 72 | 89 |
| Filip Suchý | Omaha Lancers | 54 | 31 | 38 | 69 | 66 |
| Jack Dugan | Chicago Steel | 54 | 31 | 35 | 66 | 104 |
| Jack Drury | Waterloo Black Hawks | 56 | 24 | 41 | 65 | 83 |
| Jackson Cates | Waterloo Black Hawks | 57 | 33 | 30 | 63 | 18 |
| Ben Copeland | Waterloo Black Hawks | 60 | 18 | 44 | 62 | 26 |
| Alex Steeves | Dubuque Fighting Saints | 55 | 20 | 37 | 57 | 28 |
| Casey Dornbach | Lincoln Stars | 59 | 21 | 35 | 56 | 10 |
| Quinn Preston | Dubuque Fighting Saints | 58 | 24 | 31 | 55 | 28 |
| Trenton Bliss | Green Bay Gamblers | 60 | 21 | 34 | 55 | 55 |
| Noah Cates | Omaha Lancers | 60 | 21 | 34 | 55 | 26 |

=== Leading goaltenders ===
These are the goaltenders that lead the league in GAA that have played at least 1380 minutes.

Note: GP = Games played; Mins = Minutes played; W = Wins; L = Losses; OTL = Overtime losses; SOL = Shootout losses; SO = Shutouts; GAA = Goals against average; SV% = Save percentage

| Player | Team | GP | Mins | W | L | OTL | SOL | SO | GAA | SV% |
| Filip Larsson | Tri-City Storm | 30 | 1667 | 18 | 10 | 0 | 0 | 7 | 1.65 | 0.941 |
| Strauss Mann | Fargo Force | 34 | 1972 | 22 | 8 | 2 | 1 | 5 | 1.86 | 0.932 |
| Zach Driscoll | Omaha Lancers | 38 | 2054 | 23 | 9 | 1 | 1 | 8 | 1.90 | 0.934 |
| Jared Moe | Waterloo Black Hawks | 32 | 1828 | 23 | 6 | 1 | 0 | 2 | 2.23 | 0.919 |
| Ryan Bischel | Fargo Force | 29 | 1664 | 15 | 8 | 1 | 3 | 3 | 2.24 | 0.920 |

== Post season awards ==
=== USHL awards ===
| Award | Name | Team |
|---|---|---|
| Player of the Year | Anthony Del Gaizo | Muskegon Lumberjacks |
| Forward of the Year | Jackson Cates | Waterloo Black Hawks |
| Defenseman of the Year | Ben Finkelstein | Waterloo Black Hawks |
| Rookie of the Year | Matěj Pekař | Muskegon Lumberjacks |
| Goaltender of the Year | Filip Larsson | Tri-City Storm |
| Coach of the Year | P.K. O'Handley | Waterloo Black Hawks |
| Scholar-Athlete | Alex Steeves | Dubuque Fighting Saints |
| Curt Hammer | Marc McLaughlin | Cedar Rapids RoughRiders |
| General Manager of the Year | P.K. O'Handley | Waterloo Black Hawks |
| Executive of the Year | Brandon Bruss | Green Bay Gamblers |
| Organization of the Year | Sioux Falls Stampede | |

=== All-USHL First Team ===
| Pos | Name | Team |
|---|---|---|
| G | Filip Larsson | Fargo |
| D | Ben Finkelstein | Waterloo |
| D | Graham Lillibridge | Chicago |
| F | Jackson Cates | Waterloo |
| F | Anthony Del Gaizo | Muskegon |
| F | Jack Dugan | Chicago |

=== All-USHL Second Team ===
| Pos | Name | Team |
|---|---|---|
| G | Zach Driscoll | Youngstown |
| D | Marc Del Gaizo | Muskegon |
| D | Ty Farmer | Fargo |
| F | Jack Drury | Waterloo |
| F | Jacob Schmidt-Svejstrup | Fargo |
| F | Filip Suchý | Omaha |

=== All Rookie First Team ===
| Pos | Name | Team |
|---|---|---|
| G | Oskar Autio | Chicago |
| D | Michael Callahan | Youngstown |
| D | Tyler Jubenvill | Cedar Rapids |
| F | Paul Cotter | Lincoln |
| F | Robert Mastrosimone | Chicago |
| F | Matěj Pekař | Muskegon |

=== All Rookie Second Team ===
| Pos | Name | Team |
|---|---|---|
| G | Zach Borgiel | Muskegon |
| D | Mason Klee | Lincoln |
| D | Matt Staudacher | Muskegon |
| F | Ryan O'Reilly | Madison |
| F | Tyler Madden | Tri-City |
| F | Michael Mancinelli | Madison |

== Clark Cup playoffs ==
First Round (Best-of-3) | Conference Semifinals (Best-of-5)
E1 | Team USA | 3
E6 | Chicago | 1
E3 | Muskegon | 1
E6 | Chicago | 2
Eastern Conference
E4 | Green Bay | 0
E5 | Dubuque | 2
E2 | Youngstown | 3
E5 | Dubuque | 0
W1 | Waterloo | 3
W5 | Lincoln | 1
W4 | Sioux Falls | 1
W5 | Lincoln | 2
Western Conference
W3 | Fargo | 2
W6 | Tri-City | 0
W2 | Omaha | 1
W3 | Fargo | 3

Conference Finals (Best-of-5)
E1 | Team USA | 1
E2 | Youngstown | 3
W1 | Waterloo | 1
W3 | Fargo | 3

Clark Cup Championship (Best-of-5)
E2 | Youngstown | 1
W3 | Fargo | 3

== First Round ==
=== Eastern Conference ===
==== (E3) Muskegon Lumberjacks vs. (E6) Chicago Steel ====
| April 16 | Muskegon Lumberjacks | 3 – 2 | Chicago Steel | L.C. Walker Arena |
| 3:06 - Wyatt Bongiovanni (1); 13:12 - Nolan Sullivan (1) | | First period | No scoring |
| No scoring | | Second period | No scoring |
| 12:18 - Jáchym Kondelík (1) | | Third period | Erik Urbank (1) - 10:22; Jack Dugan (1) - 17:48 |
| Keegan Karki (25 saves / 27 shots) | | Goalie stats | Oskar Autio (38 saves / 41 shots) |

| April 17 | Muskegon Lumberjacks | 2 – 6 | Chicago Steel | L.C. Walker Arena |
| 7:16 - pp - Alexander Yakovenko (1) | | First period | No scoring |
| No scoring | | Second period | Aaro Vidgren (1) - 2:14; Baker Shore (1) - pp - 5:32; Aaro Vidgren (2) - 6:17; Brian Hurley (1) - 9:17 |
| 15:40 - pp - Wyatt Bongiovanni (2) | | Third period | Blake McLaughlin (1) - 10:58; Robert Mastrosimone (1) - pp - 13:29 |
| Keegan Karki (8 saves / 11 shots); Zach Borgiel (11 saves / 14 shots) | | Goalie stats | Oskar Autio (38 saves / 40 shots) |

| April 18 | Muskegon Lumberjacks | 4 – 5 | OT | Chicago Steel | L.C. Walker Arena |
| No scoring | | First period | | No scoring |
| Marc Del Gaizo (1) - pp - 3:03; Marc Del Gaizo (2) - 9:59 | | Second period | | 3:47 - Baker Shore (2); 4:50 - Tyler Gratton (1) |
| Vincent De Mey (1) - 6:12; Vincent De Mey (2) - pp - 14:10 | | Third period | | 6:01 - Samuel Buček (1); 15:54 - Blake McLaughlin (2) |
| No scoring | | First overtime period | | 4:37 - pp - Aaro Vidgren (3) |
| Keegan Karki (25 saves / 30 shots) | | Goalie stats | | Oskar Autio (48 saves / 52 shots) |

| Chicago wins series 2 – 1 |

==== (E4) Green Bay Gamblers vs. (E5) Dubuque Fighting Saints ====
| April 16 | Green Bay Gamblers | 1 – 3 | Dubuque Fighting Saints | Resch Center |
| 1:19 - Nolan Moyle (1) | | First period | No scoring |
| No scoring | | Second period | Tyce Thompson (1) - 19:03 |
| No scoring | | Third period | Taylor Schneider (1) - 2:40; Quinn Preston (1) - en - 19:50 |
| Maksim Zhukov (27 saves / 29 shots) | | Goalie stats | Cole Weaver (23 saves / 24 shots) |

| April 17 | Green Bay Gamblers | 1 – 5 | Dubuque Fighting Saints | Resch Center |
| No scoring | | First period | Logan Pietila (1) - 0:47; Alex Steeves (1) - 7:50; Quinn Preston (2) - pp - 18:57 |
| No scoring | | Second period | Dalton Hunter (1) - 8:34 |
| 1:52 - Robert Herrman (1) | | Third period | Alex Steeves (2) - en - 19:05 |
| Maksim Zhukov (3 saves / 5 shots); Jake Begley (27 saves / 29 shots) | | Goalie stats | Cole Weaver (28 saves / 29 shots) |

| Dubuque wins series 2 – 0 |

=== Western Conference ===
==== (W4) Sioux Falls Stampede vs. (W5) Lincoln Stars ====
| April 17 | Sioux Falls Stampede | 5 – 3 | Lincoln Stars | Denny Sanford Premier Center |
| 12:43 - pp - Kevin Conley (1); 13:09 - A.J. Villella (1) | | First period | Logan Jenuwine (1) - 3:53 |
| 4:19 - Jack St. Ivany (1); 13:30 - Kirill Panyukov (1) | | Second period | Cole Krygier (1) - 7:38 |
| 9:22 - sh - Cameron Burke (1) | | Third period | Paul Cotter (1) - pp - 18:30 |
| Mikhail Berdin (34 saves / 37 shots) | | Goalie stats | Tomáš Vomáčka (11 saves / 15 shots); Derek Schaedig (9 saves / 10 shots) |

| April 18 | Sioux Falls Stampede | 3 – 6 | Lincoln Stars | Denny Sanford Premier Center |
| 9:46 - pp - Adam Dawe (1) | | First period | Logan Jenuwine (2) - 8:14 |
| 1:06 - pp - Noah Walker (1); 11:33 - Cameron Burke (2) | | Second period | Gustaf Westlund (1) - 4:31; Collin Peters (1) - 5:15; Josiah Slavin (1) - 7:09 |
| No scoring | | Third period | Casey Dornbach (1) - pp - 2:02; Ashton Calder (1) - sh - 7:59 |
| Mikhail Berdin (37 saves / 43 shots); Jaxson Stauber (1 save / 1 shot) | | Goalie stats | Derek Schaedig (27 saves / 30 shots) |

| April 19 | Sioux Falls Stampede | 4 – 5 | OT | Lincoln Stars | Denny Sanford Premier Center |
| Adam Dawe (2) - 3:19; Adam Dawe (3) - 14:00 | | First period | | 19:17 - Tristan Ashbrook (1) |
| Kirill Panyukov (2) - pp - 6:40 | | Second period | | No scoring |
| Paul DeNaples (1) - 10:19 | | Third period | | 1:15 - Collin Peters (2); 8:56 - Casey Dornbach (2); 14:09 - Eero Teräväinen (1) |
| No scoring | | First overtime period | | 19:26 - Paul Cotter (2) |
| Mikhail Berdin (44 saves / 49 shots) | | Goalie stats | | Derek Schaedig (21 saves / 25 shots) |

| Lincoln wins series 2 – 1 |

==== (W4) Fargo Force vs. (W5) Tri-City Storm ====
| April 17 | Fargo Force | 5 – 1 | Tri-City Storm | Scheels Arena |
| 7:08 - Carter Randklev (1); 10:13 - Robbie Stucker (1) | | First period | No scoring |
| 2:23 - pp - Jacob Schmidt-Svejstrup (1); 5:32 - A.J. Drobot (1) | | Second period | Tyler Ward (1) - 19:35 |
| 4:54 - Carter Randklev (2) | | Third period | No scoring |
| Strauss Mann (32 saves / 33 shots) | | Goalie stats | Jake Barczewski (16 saves / 21 shots) |

| April 18 | Fargo Force | 3 – 0 | Tri-City Storm | Scheels Arena |
| 5:36 - Garrett Van Wyhe (1) | | First period | No scoring |
| 10:23 - pp - Griffin Loughran (1) | | Second period | No scoring |
| 6:22 - Carter Randklev (3) | | Third period | No scoring |
| Strauss Mann (20 saves / 20 shots) | | Goalie stats | Jake Barczewski (30 saves / 33 shots) |

| Fargo wins series 2 – 0 |

== Conference Semifinals ==
=== Eastern Conference ===
==== (E1) Team USA vs. (E6) Chicago Steel ====
| April 21 | Team USA | 3 – 0 | Chicago Steel | USA Hockey Arena |
| No scoring | | First period | No scoring |
| 5:53 - sh - Owen Lindmark (1) | | Second period | No scoring |
| 5:47 - Drew Helleson (1); 10:30 - sh - John Beecher (1) | | Third period | No scoring |
| Cameron Rowe (34 saves / 34 shots) | | Goalie stats | Oskar Autio (24 saves / 27 shots) |

| April 22 | Team USA | 2 – 6 | Chicago Steel | USA Hockey Arena |
| No scoring | | First period | Samuel Buček (2) - 9:51 |
| 2:46 - Matt Boldy (1) | | Second period | Nick Abruzzese (1) - 9:26; Graham Lillibridge (1) - 14:59; Matteo Pietroniro (1) - 17:02 |
| 9:18 - pp - Danny Weight (1) | | Third period | Graham Lillibridge (2) - 4:54; Samuel Buček (3) - pp - 11:51 |
| Cameron Rowe (33 saves / 39 shots); Josh Graziano (2 saves / 2 shots) | | Goalie stats | Oskar Autio (43 saves / 45 shots) |

| April 26 | Chicago Steel | 2 – 3 | OT | Team USA | Fox Valley Ice Arena |
| No scoring | | First period | | John Beecher (2) - 6:37 |
| 9:52 - pp - Blake McLaughlin (3) | | Second period | | No scoring |
| 19:00 - Robert Mastrosimone (2) | | Third period | | Erik Middendorf (1) - 6:46 |
| No scoring | | First overtime period | | Danny Weight (2) - 2:51 |
| Oskar Autio (27 saves / 30 shots) | | Goalie stats | | Cameron Rowe (34 saves / 36 shots) |

| April 27 | Chicago Steel | 3 – 4 | OT | Team USA | Fox Valley Ice Arena |
| No scoring | | First period | | Erik Middendorf (2) - 6:33; Drew Helleson (2) - 17:01 |
| 3:03 - Jérémie Bucheler (1); 5:20 - Jack Dugan (2) | | Second period | | Trevor Zegras (1) - 14:19 |
| 6:28 - pp - Aaro Vidgren (4) | | Third period | | No scoring |
| No scoring | | First overtime period | | Alex Vlasic (1) - sh - 3:48 |
| Oskar Autio (32 saves / 36 shots) | | Goalie stats | | Cameron Rowe (38 saves / 41 shots) |

| USA wins series 3 – 1 |

==== (E2) Youngstown Phantoms vs. (E5) Dubuque Fighting Saints ====
| April 20 | Youngstown Phantoms | 3 – 1 | Dubuque Fighting Saints | Covelli Centre |
| 1:07 - Chase Gresock (1); 17:05 - Joseph Abate (1) | | First period | No scoring |
| 1:25 - Matt Barry (1) | | Second period | Quinn Preston (3) - pp - 18:39 |
| No scoring | | Third period | No scoring |
| Ivan Prosvetov (33 saves / 34 shots) | | Goalie stats | Cole Weaver (31 saves / 34 shots) |

| April 21 | Youngstown Phantoms | 3 – 2 | Dubuque Fighting Saints | Covelli Centre |
| No scoring | | First period | No scoring |
| 5:40 - Curtis Hall (1); 16:21 - sh - Matt Barry (2) | | Second period | Quinn Preston (4) - 0:38; Dalton Hunter (2) - 7:44 |
| 14:40 - Samuel Salonen (1) | | Third period | No scoring |
| Ivan Prosvetov (30 saves / 32 shots) | | Goalie stats | Cole Weaver (17 saves / 20 shots) |

| April 24 | Dubuque Fighting Saints | 0 – 3 | Youngstown Phantoms | Mystique Ice Center |
| No scoring | | First period | Tommy Parrottino (1) - pp - 6:19 |
| No scoring | | Second period | Joseph Abate (2) - 1:05; Chase Gresock (2) - pp - 13:59 |
| No scoring | | Third period | No scoring |
| Cole Weaver (19 saves / 22 shots) | | Goalie stats | Ivan Prosvetov (36 saves / 36 shots) |

| Youngstown wins series 3 – 1 |

=== Western Conference ===
==== (W1) Waterloo Black Hawks vs. (W5) Lincoln Stars ====
| April 21 | Waterloo Black Hawks | 2 – 3 | OT | Lincoln Stars | Young Arena |
| No scoring | | First period | | No scoring |
| 2:02 - Ethan Johnson (1); 2:37 - Garrett Wait (1) | | Second period | | Ashton Calder (2) - 2:44 |
| No scoring | | Third period | | Josiah Slavin (2) - pp - 5:37 |
| No scoring | | First overtime period | | Paul Cotter (3) - 3:10 |
| Matej Tomek (30 saves / 33 shots) | | Goalie stats | | Derek Schaedig (40 saves / 42 shots) |

| April 22 | Waterloo Black Hawks | 3 – 0 | Lincoln Stars | Young Arena |
| 11:47 - Garrett Klee (1) | | First period | No scoring |
| 2:52 - Bobby Trivigno (1) | | Second period | No scoring |
| 14:58 - Garrett Wait (2) | | Third period | No scoring |
| Jared Moe (21 saves / 21 shots) | | Goalie stats | Derek Schaedig (29 saves / 32 shots) |

| April 25 | Lincoln Stars | 1 – 2 | OT | Waterloo Black Hawks | Ice Box |
| No scoring | | First period | | Jack Drury (1) - 1:36 |
| 9:05 - pp - Paul Cotter (4) | | Second period | | No scoring |
| No scoring | | Third period | | No scoring |
| No scoring | | First overtime period | | Jackson Cates (1) - 3:00 |
| Tomáš Vomáčka (38 saves / 40 shots) | | Goalie stats | | Jared Moe (27 saves / 28 shots) |

| April 26 | Lincoln Stars | 2 – 3 | Waterloo Black Hawks | Ice Box |
| No scoring | | First period | Garrett Klee (2) - sh - 14:36 |
| 17:00 - Ashton Calder (3) | | Second period | Ethan Johnson (2) - 14:35; Jack Drury (2) - 16:05 |
| 8:48 - Casey Dornbach (3) | | Third period | No scoring |
| Tomáš Vomáčka (27 saves / 30 shots); Derek Schaedig (16 saves / 16 shots) | | Goalie stats | Jared Moe (22 saves / 24 shots) |

| Waterloo wins series 3 – 1 |

==== (W2) Omaha Lancers vs. (W3) Fargo Force ====
| April 21 | Omaha Lancers | 1 – 2 | Fargo Force | Ralston Arena |
| No scoring | | First period | Calvin Pokorny (1) - 3:07 |
| No scoring | | Second period | Mark Senden (1) - sh - 18:17 |
| 11:53 - Noah Cates (1) | | Third period | No scoring |
| Zach Driscoll (18 saves / 20 shots) | | Goalie stats | Strauss Mann (29 saves / 30 shots) |

| April 22 | Omaha Lancers | 6 – 3 | Fargo Force | Ralston Arena |
| No scoring | | First period | Grant Hebert (1) - 6:12 |
| 4:29 - Jack Randl (1); 9:47 - Brendan Furry (1); 15:42 - Ryan Savage (1); 18:42 - Cole Gallant (1) | | Second period | Sammy Steele (1) - 5:08 |
| 2:03 - Brendan Furry (2); 6:00 - pp - Cole Gallant (2) | | Third period | Ty Farmer (1) - 4:45 |
| Vinnie Purpura (17 saves / 20 shots) | | Goalie stats | Strauss Mann (14 saves / 19 shots); Ryan Bischel (5 saves / 6 shots) |

| April 24 | Fargo Force | 6 – 5 | Omaha Lancers | Scheels Arena |
| 1:41 - Ben Meyers (1); 9:45 - Jacob Schmidt-Svejstrup (2); 16:35 - A.J. Drobot (2) | | First period | No scoring |
| No scoring | | Second period | Jesper Peltonen (1) - 2:57; Mathieu De St. Phalle (1) - 4:04; Cole Gallant (3) - 5:14; Ethan Price (1) - 7:23 |
| 4:19 - pp - William Fällström (1); 5:56 - pp - A.J. Drobot (3); 13:05 - Robbie Stucker (2) | | Third period | Cole Gallant (4) - pp - 8:15 |
| Strauss Mann (31 saves / 36 shots) | | Goalie stats | Vinnie Purpura (14 saves / 17 shots); Zach Driscoll (20 saves / 23 shots) |

| April 25 | Fargo Force | 2 – 0 | Omaha Lancers | Scheels Arena |
| No scoring | | First period | No scoring |
| No scoring | | Second period | No scoring |
| 8:22 - Ty Farmer (2); 19:50 - en - Ben Meyers (2) | | Third period | No scoring |
| Strauss Mann (36 saves / 36 shots) | | Goalie stats | Zach Driscoll (40 saves / 41 shots) |

| Fargo wins series 3 – 1 |

== Conference Finals ==
=== Eastern Conference ===
==== (E1) Team USA vs. (E2) Youngstown Phantoms ====
| May 1 | Team USA | 3 – 4 | OT | Youngstown Phantoms | USA Hockey Arena |
| 3:45 - Patrick Moynihan (1) | | First period | | Max Ellis (1) - sh - 12:31; Joey Abate (3) - 15:35 |
| 4:05 - sh - Erik Middendorf (3); 18:02 - Matt Boldy (2) | | Second period | | No scoring |
| No scoring | | Third period | | Eric Esposito (1) - 13:18 |
| No scoring | | First overtime period | | Tommy Parrottino (2) - 5:59 |
| Cameron Rowe (31 saves / 35 shots) | | Goalie stats | | Ivan Prosvetov (37 saves / 40 shots) |

| May 2 | Team USA | 10 – 6 | Youngstown Phantoms | USA Hockey Arena |
| 3:40 - Owen Lindmark (2); 6:21 - Danny Weight (3); 14:25 - sh - Owen Lindmark (3); 19:42 - pp - Henry Thrun (1) | | First period | No scoring |
| 0:40 - Marshall Warren (1); 2:10 - Owen Lindmark (4); 12:06 - Matt Boldy (3) | | Second period | Jason Smallidge (1) - 1:57; Michael Regush (1) - 10:46; Eric Esposito (2) - 11:11; Joey Abate (4) - 17:25; Curtis Hall (2) - 18:25 |
| 11:06 - Marshall Warren (2); 11:28 - Patrick Moynihan (2); 17:51 - en - Erik Middendorf (4) | | Third period | Samuel Salonen (2) - 1:45 |
| Cameron Rowe (29 saves / 35 shots) | | Goalie stats | Ivan Prosvetov (16 saves / 21 shots); Wouter Peeters (5 saves / 9 shots) |

| May 4 | Youngstown Phantoms | 7 – 5 | Team USA | Covelli Centre |
| 5:39 - Jason Smallidge (2); 6:55 - Chase Gresock (3); 14:39 - Chase Gresock (4) | | First period | Henry Thrun (2) - 14:15 |
| 1:09 - pp - Chase Gresock (5); 9:32 - pp - Chase Gresock (6) | | Second period | Erik Middendorf (5) - 6:09; Matt Boldy (4) - pp - 11:01 |
| 3:02 - Jake Gingell (1); 19:05 - en - Dalton Messina (1) | | Third period | Danny Weight (4) - pp - 17:37; Owen Lindmark (5) - 19:43 |
| Ivan Prosvetov (21 saves / 26 shots) | | Goalie stats | Cameron Rowe (33 saves / 39 shots); Josh Graziano (1 save / 1 shot) |

| May 5 | Youngstown Phantoms | 5 – 1 | Team USA | Covelli Centre |
| 12:42 - Dalton Messina (2); 14:59 - Mike Regush (2) | | First period | Erik Middendorf (6) - 10:25 |
| 1:05 - Matt Barry (3) | | Second period | No scoring |
| 18:25 - en - Eric Esposito (3); 18:47 - en - Chase Gresock (7) | | Third period | No scoring |
| Ivan Prosvetov (32 saves / 33 shots) | | Goalie stats | Cameron Rowe (19 saves / 22 shots) |

| Youngstown wins series 3 – 1 |

=== Western Conference ===
==== (W1) Waterloo Black Hawks vs. (W3) Fargo Force ====
| April 28 | Waterloo Black Hawks | 2 – 0 | Fargo Force | Young Arena |
| No scoring | | First period | No scoring |
| No scoring | | Second period | No scoring |
| 15:40 - Evan Dougherty (1); 19:23 - en - Joe Cassetti (1) | | Third period | No scoring |
| Jared Moe (29 saves / 29 shots) | | Goalie stats | Strauss Mann (33 saves / 34 shots) |

| April 29 | Waterloo Black Hawks | 2 – 3 | OT | Fargo Force | Young Arena |
| No scoring | | First period | | No scoring |
| No scoring | | Second period | | Griffin Loughran (2) - 19:46 |
| 8:05 - Joe Cassetti (2); 12:13 - sh - Jack Drury (3) | | Third period | | Ben Meyers (3) - pp - 4:40 |
| No scoring | | First overtime period | | Spencer Meier (1) - pp - 3:42 |
| Jared Moe (28 saves / 31 shots) | | Goalie stats | | Strauss Mann (28 saves / 30 shots) |

| May 4 | Fargo Force | 6 – 4 | Waterloo Black Hawks | Scheels Arena |
| 14:15 - pp - Griffin Loughran (3) | | First period | Jackson Cates (2) - 8:53; Garrett Wait (3) - 9:15 |
| 3:05 - Jacob Schmidt-Svejstrup (3); 3:36 - Grant Hebert (2) | | Second period | No scoring |
| 2:07 - Grant Hebert (3); 6:44 - William Fällström (2); 19:21 - en - Jacob Schmidt-Svejstrup (4) | | Third period | Ben Finkelstein (1) - 17:44; Niko Esposito-Selivanov (1) - 19:59 |
| Strauss Mann (26 saves / 30 shots) | | Goalie stats | Jared Moe (26 saves / 31 shots) |

| May 5 | Fargo Force | 3 – 2 | Waterloo Black Hawks | Scheels Arena |
| 7:17 - Griffin Loughran (4) | | First period | Solag Bakich (1) - 4:16 |
| No scoring | | Second period | Ben Finkelstein (2) - pp - 13:36 |
| 5:01 - Mark Senden (2); 10:33 - John Schuldt (1) | | Third period | No scoring |
| Strauss Mann (35 saves / 37 shots) | | Goalie stats | Matej Tomek (25 saves / 28 shots) |

| Fargo wins series 3 – 1 |

== Clark Cup Championship ==
=== (E2) Youngstown Phantoms vs. (W3) Fargo Force ===
| May 11 | Fargo Force | 4 – 1 | Youngstown Phantoms | Scheels Arena |
| Evan Bell (1) - pp - 8:58 | | First period | No scoring |
| Griffin Loughran (5) - pp - 14:17 | | Second period | 17:35 - pp - Michael Joyaux (1) |
| Ben Meyers (4) - pp - 3:43; Garrett Van Wyhe (2) - en - 17:51 | | Third period | No scoring |
| Strauss Mann (24 saves / 25 shots) | | Goalie stats | Ivan Prosvetov (33 saves / 36 shots) |

| May 12 | Fargo Force | 2 – 3 | OT | Youngstown Phantoms | Scheels Arena |
| No scoring | | First period | | No scoring |
| John Schuldt (2) - 4:24 | | Second period | | 15:30 - Eric Esposito (4); 8:16 - pp - Nick Cardelli (1) |
| Griffin Loughran (6) - sh - 19:08 | | Third period | | No scoring |
| No scoring | | First overtime period | | 6:32 - Nick Cardelli (2) |
| Strauss Mann (24 saves / 27 shots) | | Goalie stats | | Ivan Prosvetov (36 saves / 38 shots) |

| May 18 | Youngstown Phantoms | 2 – 3 | Fargo Force | Covelli Centre |
| No scoring | | First period | 13:40 Griffin Loughran (7) |
| Chase Gresock (8) - 1:04; Nick Cardelli (3) - pp - 13:39 | | Second period | 13:45 - Evan Bell (2) |
| No scoring | | Third period | 13:07 - Bartek Bison (1) |
| Ivan Prosvetov (22 saves / 25 shots) | | Goalie stats | Strauss Mann (38 saves / 40 shots) |

| May 19 | Youngstown Phantoms | 2 – 4 | Fargo Force | Covelli Centre |
| No scoring | | First period | No scoring |
| Matt Barry (4) - 19:21 | | Second period | 5:15 - pp - Evan Bell (3); 14:45 - Garrett Van Wyhe (3) |
| Curtis Hall (3) - 3:43 | | Third period | 16:06 - Ty Farmer (3); 19:59 - en - Mark Senden (3) |
| Ivan Prosvetov (31 saves / 34 shots) | | Goalie stats | Strauss Mann (26 saves / 28 shots) |

| Fargo wins series 3 – 1 |

== Playoff scoring leaders ==
Note: GP = Games played; G = Goals; A = Assists; Pts = Points; PIM = Penalty minutes

| Player | Team | GP | G | A | Pts | PIM |
|---|---|---|---|---|---|---|
| Chase Gresock | Youngstown Phantoms | 11 | 8 | 6 | 14 | 2 |
| Matt Barry | Youngstown Phantoms | 11 | 4 | 10 | 14 | 8 |
| Jacob Schmidt-Svejstrup | Fargo Force | 14 | 4 | 8 | 12 | 15 |
| Evan Bell | Fargo Force | 14 | 3 | 8 | 11 | 24 |
| Grant Hebert | Fargo Force | 14 | 3 | 7 | 10 | 10 |
| Robbie Stucker | Fargo Force | 14 | 2 | 8 | 10 | 12 |
| Griffin Loughran | Fargo Force | 13 | 7 | 2 | 9 | 14 |
| Eric Esposito | Youngstown Phantoms | 11 | 4 | 5 | 9 | 10 |
| Nick Cardelli | Youngstown Phantoms | 11 | 3 | 6 | 9 | 8 |
| William Fällström | Fargo Force | 14 | 2 | 7 | 9 | 6 |

== Playoff leading goaltenders ==
Note: GP = Games played; Mins = Minutes played; W = Wins; L = Losses; GA = Goals Allowed; SO = Shutouts; SV% = Save percentage; GAA = Goals against average

| Player | Team | GP | Mins | W | L | GA | SO | SV% | GAA |
|---|---|---|---|---|---|---|---|---|---|
| Jared Moe | Waterloo Black Hawks | 6 | 366 | 4 | 2 | 11 | 2 | .933 | 1.81 |
| Strauss Mann | Fargo Force | 14 | 831 | 11 | 3 | 29 | 2 | .932 | 2.09 |
| Cole Weaver | Dubuque Fighting Saints | 5 | 294 | 2 | 3 | 11 | 0 | .915 | 2.25 |
| Zach Driscoll | Omaha Lancers | 3 | 294 | 0 | 3 | 11 | 0 | .929 | 2.29 |
| Derek Schaedig | Lincoln Stars | 6 | 138 | 3 | 1 | 13 | 0 | .916 | 2.55 |
