= 2022 NCAA Division I men's ice hockey tournament =

- Teams: 16
- Finals site: TD Garden, Boston, Massachusetts
- Champions: Denver Pioneers (9th title)
- Runner-up: Minnesota State Mavericks (1st title game)
- Semifinalists: Michigan Wolverines (26th Frozen Four); Minnesota Golden Gophers (22nd Frozen Four)
- Winning coach: David Carle (1st title)
- MOP: Michael Benning (Denver)
- Attendance: 17,850 (Championship); 53,550 (Frozen Four); 95,195 (Tournament)

The 2022 NCAA Division I men's ice hockey tournament was the national championship tournament for men's college ice hockey in the United States scheduled for on April 7–9, 2022. The tournament involved 16 teams in single-elimination play to determine the national champion at the Division I level of the National Collegiate Athletic Association (NCAA), the highest level of competition in college hockey. The tournament's Frozen Four—the semifinals and finals—were hosted by Hockey East at the TD Garden in Boston, Massachusetts.

In this year’s tournament, the Hockey East conference went winless, despite having three programs in the playoffs (Massachusetts, Massachusetts-Lowell, and Northeastern). This was the first time Hockey East went winless in tournament play since 1992.

== Tournament procedure ==
2022 Regionals (blue) and Frozen Four (red)

The tournament is composed of four groups of four teams in regional brackets. The four regionals are officially named after their geographic areas. The following are the sites for the 2022 regionals:

March 24 & 26, 2022
East Regional, MVP Arena – Albany, New York (Hosts: Union)
West Regional, Budweiser Events Center – Loveland, Colorado (Host: Denver)
March 25 & 27, 2022
Midwest Regional, PPL Center – Allentown, Pennsylvania (Host: Penn State)
Northeast Regional, DCU Center – Worcester, Massachusetts (Host: Holy Cross)

The winner of each regional will advance to the Frozen Four:

April 7–9
TD Garden – Boston, Massachusetts (Host: Hockey East)

== Qualifying teams ==
The at-large bids and seeding for each team in the tournament were announced on March 20, 2022.

The NCHC received five bids, the Big Ten and Hockey East each received three, the CCHA and ECAC both received two, and one team from Atlantic Hockey received a berth.

Midwest Regional – Allentown							East Regional – Albany						
Seed	School	Conference	Record	Berth type	Appearance	Last bid	Seed	School	Conference	Record	Berth type	Appearance	Last bid
1	Michigan (1)	Big Ten	29–9–1	Tournament champion	39th	2021	1	Minnesota State (2)	CCHA	35–5–0	Tournament champion	8th	2021
2	Quinnipiac	ECAC	31–6–3	At-Large bid	8th	2021	2	North Dakota	NCHC	24–13–1	At-Large bid	34th	2021
3	St. Cloud State	NCHC	18–14–4	At-Large bid	16th	2021	3	Notre Dame	Big Ten	27–11–0	At-Large bid	13th	2021
4	American International	Atlantic Hockey	22–12–3	Tournament champion	3rd	2021	4	Harvard	ECAC	21–10–3	Tournament champion	26th	2019
Northeast Regional – Worcester							West Regional – Loveland						
Seed	School	Conference	Record	Berth type	Appearance	Last bid	Seed	School	Conference	Record	Berth type	Appearance	Last bid
1	Western Michigan (3)	NCHC	25–11–1	At-Large bid	7th	2017	1	Denver (4)	NCHC	27–9–1	At-Large bid	29th	2019
2	Minnesota	Big Ten	24–12–0	At-Large bid	39th	2021	2	Minnesota Duluth	NCHC	21–15–4	Tournament champion	15th	2021
3	Massachusetts	Hockey East	22–12–2	Tournament champion	4th	2021	3	Michigan Tech	CCHA	21–12–3	At-Large bid	14th	2018
4	Northeastern	Hockey East	25–12–1	At-Large bid	8th	2019	4	Massachusetts Lowell	Hockey East	21–10–3	At-Large bid	9th	2017

Number in parentheses denotes overall seed in the tournament.

== Tournament bracket ==
Regional semifinals March 24–25
1	Michigan (1)	5
4	American International	3
Midwest – Allentown – Fri/Sun
2	Quinnipiac	5
3	St. Cloud State	4
1	Denver (4)	3
4	Massachusetts Lowell	2
West – Loveland – Thu/Sat
2	Minnesota Duluth	3
3	Michigan Tech	0
1	Western Michigan (3)	2*
4	Northeastern	1
Northeast – Worcester – Fri/Sun
2	Minnesota	4*
3	Massachusetts	3
1	Minnesota State (2)	4
4	Harvard	3
East – Albany – Thu/Sat
2	North Dakota	1
3	Notre Dame	2*

Regional Finals; March 26–27
1	Michigan (1)	7
2	Quinnipiac	4
1	Denver (4)	2
2	Minnesota Duluth	1
1	Western Michigan (3)	0
2	Minnesota	3
1	Minnesota State (2)	1
3	Notre Dame	0

Semifinals; April 7
MW1	Michigan (1)	2
W1	Denver (4)	3*
NE2	Minnesota	1
E1	Minnesota State (2)	5

Championship; April 9
W1	Denver	5
E1	Minnesota State	1

* denotes overtime period

== Results ==
Note: All game times are local.

=== Midwest Region – Allentown, Pennsylvania ===
==== Regional semifinals ====
March 25, 2022; 3:00 PM	(1) Michigan	5 – 3 (2–1, 3–1, 0–1)	(4) American International	PPL Center; Attendance: 2,155

Game reference

Erik Portillo
Goalies
Alec Calvaruso
Referees:
Cameron Lynch
Brad LeBlanc
Linesmen:
Patrick Dapuzzo
Steve Drain

(Hughes, Moyle) Garrett Van Wyhe (5) – 03:37	1–0
(Brisson, Beniers) Ethan Edwards (3) – 04:16	2–0
	2–1	12:32 – Brian Rigali (13) (Bennett, Galambos)
(Power, Johnson) Brendan Brisson (20) – PP – 20:43	3–1
(Brisson, Johnson) Matty Beniers (20) – GW – 22:43	4–1
	4–2	26:15 – Justin Young (12) (Theodore)
(Power, Samoskevich) Dylan Duke (10) – 26:43	5–2
	5–3	53:48 – PP – Blake Bennett (19) (Barriga, Young)

8 min
Penalties
6 min
31
Shots
32

Game summary
Heavy favorite, Michigan, lived up to their billing early when the Wolverines scored twice in the first five minutes of the game. Alec Calvaruso held the fort and stopped the tournament's top seed from extending their lead afterwards. Past the mid-way point of the period, AIC finally got a bounce their way when Blake Bennett tried to center the puck. It deflected up into the air, hit Luke Hughes in the back and then rolled past a sprawling Erik Portillo.

A penalty taken by AIC at the end of the first period resulted in a Michigan power play goal less than a minute into the second. A quick passing play a few minutes later put Michigan ahead by 3 and the Wolverines looked to be just too much for the Yellow Jackets. A few minutes later, however, AIC scored their second goal of the game after a turnover at the Michigan blueline. The Wolverines responded the very next shift when Dylan Duke potted his team's 5th goal, however, the play was reviewed for offsides. While a Michigan player had entered the zone before the puck, it was unclear whether or not an AIC player had shot the puck into the zone. While it appeared that Michigan had caused the puck to cross the blueline, the video was ruled inconclusive and the goal was allowed to stand. AIC continued to play hard, forcing Michigan to take consecutive penalties in the middle of the period, but weren't able to capitalize on their opportunities.

Michigan tried to play a sleepy third period and bleed away the clock but AIC kept playing hard. After Garrett Van Wyhe took an inadvisable holding penalty in the middle of the period, Bennett found himself alone in front of the net and slid the puck around Portillo. Near the end of the game, after the Yellow Jackets pulled their goaltender, Nick Blankenburg cross-checked Elijiah Barriga into the board from behind. There was some concern that the Michigan captain might receive a suspension for the hit and miss the team's next game.

March 25, 2022; 8:00 PM	(2) Quinnipiac	5 – 4 (2–0, 1–3, 2–1)	(3) St. Cloud State	PPL Center; Attendance: 2,155

Game reference

Yaniv Perets
Goalies
Jaxon Castor
Referees:
Ryan Sweeney
Mike Schubert
Linesmen:
Anthony Valle
Shane Kanaly

(Metsa, Brind'Amour) Brendan Less (4) – 04:37	1–0
(Rasanen) TJ Friedmann (10) – 17:26	2–0
	2–1	21:08 – Nolan Walker (10) (Hentges)
	2–2	27:21 – Sam Hentges (12) (Walker)
(de Jong, Metsa) Michael Lombardi (14) – 30:12	3–2
	3–3	32:39 – Kyler Kupka (19) (Bushy, Fitzgerald)
(Mendel, Chorney) Ethan de Jong (11) – 40:27	4–3
(Mendel, de Jong) Jayden Lee (5) – GW – 48:37	5–3
	5–4	58:44 – EA – Nolan Walker (19) (unassisted)

2 min
Penalties
0 min
16
Shots
34

==== Regional Final ====
March 27, 2022; 6:30 PM	(1) Michigan	7 – 4 (2–0, 2–0, 3–4)	(2) Quinnipiac	PPL Center; Attendance: 3,256

Game reference

Erik Portillo
Goalies
Yaniv Perets out 40:00
Dylan St. Cyr in 40:00
Referees:
Geoff Miller
Steve Rouillard
Linesmen:
Jeff McCorkle
Kyle Richetelle

(Power, Lambert) Nolan Moyle (6) – 00:33	1–0
(Hughes) Jimmy Lambert (5) – 14:36	2–0
(Brisson, Power) Thomas Bordeleau (11) – PP – 26:06	3–0
(Blankenburg) Garrett Van Wyhe (6) – SH – 38:54	4–0
	4–1	44:12 – Jayden Lee (6) (Brind'Amour, van Nes)
	4–2	49:01 – Wyatt Bongiovanni (16) (de Jong)
	4–3	51:02 – Desi Burgart (8) (Smilanic, Quillan)
(Bordeleau, Estapa) Michael Pastujov (11) – GW EN – 56:23	5–3
(Power) Nolan Moyle (7) – EN – 58:37	6–3
(Bordeleau, Power) Brendan Brisson (21) – PP – 59:25	7–3
	7–4	59:38 – Zach Metsa (10) (Quillan, Leyh)

6 min
Penalties
4 min
30
Shots
34

Game summary
Just as they had in their first game, Michigan came out charging and raced into the Bobcats' end. After Owen Power hit the post, the puck bounced out to Nolan Moyle and he took a whack at the puck, sending it off of Jayden Lee into the net just 33 seconds into the game. Afterwards both teams went on the attack and several additional scoring chances were produced over the next 14 minutes. After it appeared that Quinnipiac might be turning the tide in their favor, Michigan scored their second goal on a deflection right off of an offensive faceoff. After the second goal, Michigan dominated play for the remainder of the period.

The play evened out in the second but Quinnipiac handed Michigan a golden opportunity when Michael Lombardi took a hooking call 5 minutes in. Just 30 seconds later, Thomas Bordeleau got free in the middle of the Quinnipiac box and fired a shot past Yaniv Perets, who was moving side-to-side. The third goal appeared to take the wind out of the Bobcats' sails and Michigan again took control of the play. Quinnipiac slowly got back into the game and, after a gaff behind the goal, Erik Portillo took an interference penalty to stop a scoring chance. The 50th-ranked power play wasn't able to generate much and it wasn't until the sides had evened-out that Quinnipiac got a quality scoring opportunity. Michigan took another penalty just before the end of the period but Quinnipiac flubbed the puck along the wall after the faceoff. Michigan raced down the ice, flipped the puck into the crease, and Perets couldn't find the puck as it hit the Bobcat goalie and rolled into the net.

Desperate to change something, Quinnipiac opened the third period with Dylan St. Cyr in goal. The Bobcats went on the offense and relentlessly attack the Michigan goal. Portillo made several saves until Jayden Lee shot the puck while falling, sending it in off of Nick Blankenburg's skate. Over the next several minutes Quinnipiac had trouble keeping the puck in Michigan's end but, when Ethan Edwards caught an edge and fell down, Ethan de Jong grabbed the loose puck, passed it across the front of the net to team captain Wyatt Bongiovanni, who deposited it into a wide-open cage. Just a few minutes later the Bobcats won a battle behind the Michigan net which led to Ty Smilanic passing the puck out to Desi Burgart, who had been left alone at the top of the Michigan goal crease, and the Wolverines' lead was down to 1. Immediately afterwards, Portillo went to the bench to get a skate issue taken care of and Michigan was forced to take its timeout on the delay. The delay didn't stop the Bobcat avalanche when Jimmy Lambert took a hooking penalty deep in the Quinnipiac zone. the Wolverines killed off the penalty but Quinnipiac's assault did not relent. Surprisingly, Rand Pecknold pulled St. Cyr just after the 4-minute mark and though they won the ensuing faceoff, a bad pass by Oliver Chau gave Michigan the puck. The Wolverines skated down the ice and potted it in an open goal to double their lead and take all of the momentum away from the Bobcats. A further empty-netter essentially salted the game away and Michigan advanced to the Frozen Four.

=== East Region – Albany, New York ===
==== Regional semifinals ====
March 24, 2022; 12:00 PM	(1) Minnesota State	4 – 3 (2–0, 1–2, 1–1)	(4) Harvard	MVP Arena; Attendance: 2,345

Game reference

Dryden McKay
Goalies
Mitchell Gibson
Referees:
Joe Sullivan
Dan Dreger
Linesmen:
Justin Hills
Geoff Shultz

(Hirose, Groll) Connor Gregga (6) – 14:12	1–0
(Hirose) Reggie Lutz (14) – PP – 17:46	2–0
(unassisted) Brendan Furry (12) – 22:06	3–0
	3–1	36:42 – Sean Farrell (11) (Coronato, Abruzzese)
	3–2	37:30 – Alex Gaffney (8) (Laferriere)
(Groll, Hirose) Ondřej Pavel (11) – GW – 45:59	4–2
	4–3	56:29 – PP EA – Casey Dornbach (9) (Farrell, Laferriere)

4 min
Penalties
6 min
40
Shots
22

Game summary
The game started slowly, with both teams feeling out one another in the first period, but Minnesota State soon took over the game. The Mavericks' hemmed Harvard in their own zone for much of the first, firing 19 shots on goal, and finally opened the scoring on a deflected Akito Hirose shot from the point. They stretched their lead to 2 when Lutz found himself alone in the right circle on the power play, but then gave Harvard a chance when Benton Maass took a tripping call near the end of the period. MSU managed to kill off the disadvantage and then scored their third goal less than a minute later. Near the middle of the period, Marshall Rifai put his hand on the puck when it was in his own goal crease, which gave Minnesota State a penalty shot. Mitchell Gibson managed to stop the nation's #2 scorer, Julian Napravnik, to keep his team in the game.

With Minnesota State completely dominating the first half of the game, Harvard needed to find something to change the momentum. In the later part of the second, US Olympian Sean Farrell collected a puck behind the goal-line and fired it out in front of the net. MSU's goaltender, Dryden McKay, was unable to get back to his post quick enough and the puck deflected off of his pad and into the net. Less than a minute later, Harvard got its second goal to cut the Mavericks' lead to one.

Harvard continued to press but MSU closed ranks and managed to prevent the Crimson from tying the game despite several chances. In the third period, the game began to open up and the two teams traded chances. After a save at one end, the Mavericks' got on a break and Ondrej Pavel fired the puck past Gibson's glove into the top corner. The two-goal cushion proved vital for Minnesota State as Harvard's continued attack eventually forced Nathan Smith to take a tripping penalty. On the ensuing power play, Harvard pulled Gibson and scored to pull within one. Harvard kept up the pressure in the final 3:31, twice finding a half-open net on the left side of the Minnesota State cage. Unfortunately for the Crimson, they fanned on both opportunities, failing to get the puck on goal. Their loss was MSU's gain as the Maverick's advanced out of the first round of the tournament for just the second time in eight appearances.

March 24, 2022; 6:00 PM	(2) North Dakota	1 – 2 (OT) (1–0, 0–1, 0–0, 0–1)	(3) Notre Dame	MVP Arena; Attendance: 2,345

Game reference

Zach Driscoll
Goalies
Matthew Galajda
Referees:
Geno Binda Jr.
Jeremy Tufts
Linesmen:
Kevin Briganti
Bill Kingdon

(Ness) Brent Johnson (2) – 18:43	1–0
	1–1	21:03 – Landon Slaggert (12) (G. Slaggert)
	1–2	61:38 – GW PP – Graham Slaggert (12) (Leivermann, L. Slaggert)

6 min
Penalties
6 min
24
Shots
25

Game summary
As predicted by some, the game quickly became a defensive struggle. Both teams played to their strengths, relying on a stifling brand of teamwork to limit chances on their own goal. The immediate result was very few shots in the first period but that didn't stop Brent Johnson from being able to open the scoring near the end of the period. Just after the start of the second, Graham Slaggert turned over the puck at the North Dakota blue line and sent his brother Landon in on a break. The younger Slaggert slid the puck between Zach Driscoll's pads to tie the score.

The pace of play picked up afterwards but the two teams still remained steady defensively. North Dakota received a golden opportunity in the third when Riese Gaber was hooked while going towards the Notre Dame goal and received a penalty shot. Matthew Galajda stopped the attempt to keep the game tied at 1-all. With just over 90 seconds remaining, the Fighting Hawks got another boon when Jack Adams was called for hooking and the team went on their third power play. Notre Dame, however, had one of the best penalty kills in NCAA history, stopping opponents at a more than 90% rate. They were able to prevent UND from scoring and, with just a few seconds left in the game, streaked into the North Dakota end and fired the puck into the goal after a scramble in front of the net. Before any real celebrations could begin, however, the referees had to check the replay to see if time had expired before the puck entered the net. After a long review, the goal was waved off and the two teams headed to overtime.

While North Dakota began overtime still on the power play, a missed pass just 14 seconds into the period caused Chris Jandric to take an interference penalty in order to prevent a breakaway. On the ensuing Notre Dame advantage, Graham Slaggert ended the game with a shot that beat Driscoll on the far side.

==== Regional Final ====
March 26, 2022; 6:30 PM	(1) Minnesota State	1 – 0 (1–0, 0–0, 0–0)	(3) Notre Dame	MVP Arena; Attendance: 3,449

Game reference
Dryden McKay	Goalies	Matthew Galajda	Referees: Geno Bindo; Jeremy Tufts; Linesmen: Kevin Briganti; Bill Kingdon
(Furry) Nathan Smith (19) – GW – 19:44 / 1–0			Referees: Geno Bindo; Jeremy Tufts; Linesmen: Kevin Briganti; Bill Kingdon
6 min	Penalties	2 min	Referees: Geno Bindo; Jeremy Tufts; Linesmen: Kevin Briganti; Bill Kingdon
33	Shots	23	Referees: Geno Bindo; Jeremy Tufts; Linesmen: Kevin Briganti; Bill Kingdon

Game summary
Both team began the game skating fast. As they were known to do, Minnesota State held onto the puck for great stretches and prevented Notre Dame from getting a shot on goal for more than 10 minutes of game time. Though the Mavericks had the puck more often, they didn't dominate the play, being held to the outside by the ND defense. Blocked shots turned out to be a feature of the first with both teams combining for nearly as many blocks as shots on goal. With just 16 seconds left in the period, Nathan Smith scored on a rebound after an offensive zone faceoff.

Notre Dame got a chance to even the score early in the second with a power play but, despite getting several shots on goal, Dryden McKay kept his team clean. Minnesota State returned to their first period form thereafter and continued to threaten the Notre Dame net. Past the midway point of the game, Matthew Galajda, aided by several of his teammates, made a series of spectacular saves that kept their team within one. The Fighting Irish got another man-advantage at the end of the period but the defense from MNS shut down the Notre Dame attack.

Minnesota State came out hard in in the third getting several great opportunities for goals early but Galajda remained strong in goal. Notre Dame started tilting the ice in the middle of the period but they couldn't sustain the pressure. While the Mavericks held onto the puck for much of the middle pert of the period, ND nearly tied the game when they hit the post on the short side and caused a melee as both teams scrambled for the rebound. The Irish tried to take control of the play after the near-miss but the Mavericks defense held. After Galajda was pulled, Notre Dame was able to keep the puck in the Minnesota State end for most of the final 2 minutes but they could hardly get a shot on goal and Dryden McKay raised his NCAA record totals to 37 wins on the season and 34 career shutouts.

=== Northeast Region – Worcester, Massachusetts ===
==== Regional semifinals ====
March 25, 2022; 12:00 PM	(1) Western Michigan	2 – 1 (OT) (1–0, 0–0, 0–1, 1–0)	(4) Northeastern	DCU Center; Attendance: 6,002

Game reference

Brandon Bussi
Goalies
Devon Levi
Referees:
Brendan Blanchard
Chris Leavitt
Linesmen:
Brendan Lewis
Matt Terreri

(Worrad, Frank) Cole Gallant (9) – 14:01	1–0
	1–1	56:40 – Aidan McDonough (25) (Colangelo)
(unassisted) Luke Grainger (9) – GW – 61:33	2–1

2 min
Penalties
6 min
36
Shots
31

Game summary
From the drop of the puck, the game looked much different then any the day before. Both Northeastern and Western Michigan came out flying, skating shooting and hitting at a very high rate. Neither team was able to get much sustained zone time in their opponent's end but the chances came fast and furious. After the mid point of the period, the ice began to tilt in the Broncos' favor and WMU eventually scored the game's first goal on a rocket from Cole Gallant. Shortly thereafter, Northeastern got into penalty trouble but managed to stop the Broncos from increasing their lead due to the stellar play from Devon Levi.

Northeastern picked up their play during the second period, at one point outshooting Western Michigan 10–2, but they couldn't find the twine. The Broncos again carried the play in the second half, clogging up the neureal zone and counterattacking to even the shot clock. Neither team was able to score but both teams kept on hitting, much to the delight of the sparse crowd.

The play continued on the same path in the third. With both teams blocking shots to great effect, neither team could get great looks at the net. As the time ticked away, Northeastern began to press a bit harder, trying to open up the game, and finally got their shot with just over three minutes remaining. Sam Colangelo turned the puck over at the Broncos' blue line and slipped it to Aidan McDonough. The big forward moved around Jacob Bauer, who had fallen to the ice, and then skated through the crease, jamming the puck past a sprawled-out Brandon Bussi. With the score now tied, both team's traded chances, trying to earn the game-winner, but 60 minutes wasn't enough to decide the game and overtime was needed.

Western Michigan got a tremendous chance just past the 90 second mark when Luke Grainger knocked down a clearing attempt by Levi, wrapped the puck around and tried to score. Initially it appeared that Levi got back to make a save just in the nick of time but, after a review, it was clear that the puck had crossed the line and Western Michigan won their first NCAA tournament game in eight chances.

March 25, 2022; 6:00 PM	(2) Minnesota	4 – 3 (OT) (1–2, 1–1, 1–0, 1–0)	(3) Massachusetts	DCU Center; Attendance: 6,002

Game reference

Justen Close
Goalies
Matt Murray
Referees:
Ryan Hersey
Nick Krebsbach
Linesmen:
John Grandt
Tyler Liffrig

	0–1	14:09 – EA – Reed Lebster (8) (Kiefiuk, Ufko)
	0–2	15:05 – PP – Garrett Wait (13) (Ufko, Trivigno)
(Meyers, Knies) Ryan Johnson (3) – 18:02	1–2
	1–3	21:24 – Reed Lebster (9) (Kiefiuk, Del Gaizo)
(Nelson, Pitlick) Tristan Broz (6) – 37:09	2–3
(unassisted) Matthew Knies (13) – PP – 53:17	3–3
(Huglen, Nelson) Ben Meyers (17) – GW – 68:31	4–3

2 min
Penalties
4 min
24
Shots
23

Game summary
Massachusetts and Minnesota both came out skating, however, few of their shots managed to get on goal in the first. In the back half of the period, Ryan Johnson took an interference penalty. UMass pulled their goaltender on the delayed penalty and scored before Minnesota could touch the puck. The goal was reviewed because it appeared that Anthony Del Gaizo had a skate in the crease, which would have negated the score. With some measure of controversy, the referees ruled that Del Gaizo was not in the blue paint at the moment that puck entered the cage. Just over a minute later, while on the ensuing power play, the Minutemen doubled their lead when a shot from the point was stopped by Justen Close but then deflected off of Garrett Wait's skate into the net. While the second goal was reviewed as well, there wasn't any question as to its veracity. Minnesota got on their toes after allowing two goals in quick succession and began attacking Massachusetts. Johnson tried to make up for his penalty by firing a puck on Murray, who stopped the puck, only to see it deflect off of his own defenseman, Aaron Bohlinger, and into the net.

From the start of the second, UMass got on its horse and drove into Minnesota's end. After collecting the puck behind the net, Cal Kiefiuk walked out in front but Close stopped the shot. In the resulting scramble, the Minnesota netminder thought he had the puck trapped beneath his glove, but it was still loose. Lebster grabbed the biscuit and fired it around several sets of legs into the goal. The Gophers set about trying to get the goal back but missed on several opportunities. Minnesota was not deterred, however, and they continued to attack. Near the end of the period, Tristan Broz deflected a bouncing puck past Murray and cut the lead back to 1.

UMass tried to slow the game down in the third and were able to limit Minnesota to a small number of shots. On the second Minnesota power play of the frame, Matthew Kessel collected the puck behind his own net and attempted to clear. Instead of leaving the zone, the puck hit Matthew Knies in the body, dropped to the ice and he shot it into the top corner in one motion to tie the game. With both teams now needing to score, the game opened up once more.

Both teams traded chances in the third period and overtime with multiple end-to-end rushes. Near the midpoint of the first overtime period, team captain and US Olympian, Ben Meyers, received a pass from behind the net and fired it past Murray on the far side, winning the game for Minnesota.

==== Regional Final ====
March 27, 2022; 4:00 PM	(1) Western Michigan	0 – 3 (0–1, 0–0, 0–2)	(2) Minnesota	DCU Center; Attendance: 2,848

Game reference

Brandon Bussi
Goalies
Justen Close
Referees:
Joe Carusone
C.J. Hanfin
Linesmen:
Brian Oliver
Ryan Knapp

0–1	10:10 – GW – Matthew Knies (14) (Faber, Meyers)
0–2	40:33 – PP – Aaron Huglen (7) (Meyers, LaCombe)
0–3	58:03 – SH EN – Blake McLaughlin (13) (unassisted)

2 min
Penalties
4 min
24
Shots
26

Game summary
From the start, Minnesota carried the balance of play, keeping the puck in the Western Michigan end much of the time. The Broncos, however, were able to make several rushes towards the Gopher net. In the middle of the period, Matthew Knies got lost in front of the WMU net and fired a pass from behind the net into the cage. Even with the phycal play in the game, both teams played on the right side of the law with just a single penalty being called in the first 30 minutes.

Western Michigan upped their game in the second half and started firing on the Gopher net. Justen Close made several key saves to keep the Broncos off of the scoresheet. Just past the mid-way point of the game, Justen Close stopped a shot from between the circles but he punched it back into the slot with his blocker. Ronnie Attard was following the play and took a swing at the loose puck, causing it to arch over Close into the net. Unfortunately for Western Michigan, replay revealed that the play was offside and the goal was waved off. The two proceeded to trade opportunities for the remainder of the period but neither could score.

On the opening faceoff of the third period, Ethen Frank took a slashing penalty and gave Minnesota their first power play of the game. It only took the Gophers 23 seconds to make the Broncos pay when Aaron Huglen fired the puck short-side from the left circle. Just shy of the 5-minute mark, Western Michigan gave away the puck at their own blue line and Minnesota went in on a 2-on-1. Brandon Bussi made a tremendous save to keep his team in the game. In the later part of the game, however, Minnesota's legs were fine form and they continued to win races to the puck. The Gophers kept WMU in their own end and gave no life to one of the best offenses in the country. On one of the few sustained rushes into the Minnesota end, Matt Staudacher took a hooking call and put Western on the power play. Curiously, Bussi remained in net for the first half of the advantage and nothing materialized for the Broncos. Once the goalie was pulled, however, it only gave Minnesota an empty net to shoot at and the third goal for Minnesota all but ended the game.

=== West Region – Loveland, Colorado ===
==== Regional semifinals ====
March 24, 2022; 7:00 PM	(1) Denver	3 – 2 (1–1, 0–0, 2–1)	(4) Massachusetts Lowell	Budweiser Events Center; Attendance: 3,138

Game reference

Magnus Chrona
Goalies
Owen Savory
Referees:
Tony Czech
Kenny Anderson
Linesmen:
Sam Shikowsky
Nicholas Bradshaw

	0–1	09:42 – Lucas Condotta (10) (Stefanson, Korencik)
(Lee, Tuomisto) Brett Stapley (16) – 18:36	1–1
(Benning) Carter Savoie (21) – 49:26	2–1
	2–2	54:21 – Connor Sodergren (7) (McDonald, Crasa)
(Mazur) Cameron Wright (21) – GW – 57:03	3–2

19 min
Penalties
10 min
28
Shots
18

Game summary
Despite Denver coming into the game as a heavy favorite, it was Lowell who carried the majority of the play in the first. The River Hawks defended well, preventing the Pioneers from generating offensive chances, and opened the scoring mid-way through the period. However, with less than two minutes remaining in the first, Denver recovered to tie the game on a deflection. The goal seemed to settle down both the team and the partisan crowd, who relaxed after the score was tied.

While UML had their moments in the middle frame, the River Hawks took three separate penalties in the second, giving the nation's top power play unit ample time to give the Pioneers the lead. Massachusetts Lowell, however, was up to the task and killed off each disadvantage. Denver switched things up after failing on their first three power plays and started the second five-man unit. The ploy almost worked when the puck bounced off of the post, hit Owen Savory in the back, and headed for the net. UML's Jon McDonald arrived to knock the puck away before that could happen.

In the third period, Denver slowly took over control of the game, threatening the Lowell goal on several occasions. The game changed after Carter Mazur took a delay of game penalty by closing his hand on the puck. After a faceoff halfway through the power play, Connor Sodergren cross-checked Brett Stapley in the head. Stapley replied by jamming the butt-end of his stick into Sodergren's mid-section. While Sodergren got a 2-minute penalty, Stapley received a major penalty and a game-misconduct. When play resumed, Mass Lowell continued their power play, which was now played at 4-on-3. After Mazur was let out of the box, Denver broke towards the UML cage and Carter Savoie gave Denver the lead. With the momentum now fully with the Pioneers, they held the fort during the 3-minute power play for Lowell and looked ready to cruise to victory. The River Hawks, however, wouldn't go away. McDonald, who found himself in front of the Denver net, kicked the puck to an open Sodergren who fired the puck into the net.

With less than three minutes remaining, Mazur flipped the puck in the air towards the Lowell net. Cameron Wright extended his stick as far as he could and deflected the puck through Savory and it slid just over the goal line. Desperate to tie the game, Lowell pulled their goalie with 101 seconds to play but Denver was able to hold off the River Hawks and held onto their lead for the victory.

March 24, 2022; 1:00 PM	(2) Minnesota Duluth	3 – 0 (1–0, 0–0, 2–0)	(3) Michigan Tech	Budweiser Events Center; Attendance: 3,138

Game reference

Ryan Fanti
Goalies
Blake Pietila
Referees:
Colin Kronforst
Sean Fernandez
Linesmen:
Justin Cornell
Pat Richardson

(unassisted) Kobe Roth (17) – GW – 14:54	1–0
(unassisted) Kyler Kleven (3) – 46:09	2–0
(unassisted) Kobe Roth (18) – EN – 59:53	3–0

8 min
Penalties
15 min
25
Shots
28

Game summary
Right after the start of the game, Michigan Tech found themselves behind the 8-ball when their leading scorer and Hobey Baker Award finalist, Brian Halonen, received a game misconduct for boarding. While Minnesota Duluth didn't score on the ensuing power play, the lack of offensive punch was felt by Tech as they failed to score on any of their three power play opportunities. The Bulldogs, on the other hand, were able to follow a familiar script by taking an early lead and then rely on the combination of strong defense and stellar goaltending to hold the Huskies off of the scoresheet.

Another feature of the game was a bouncing puck that didn't seem to be able to settle down. This helped UMD more as several rushes by Tech were ruined by the inability to control the puck during the middle part of the game. In the second period the Huskies began to tilt the ice in their favor, but none of their 7 shots on goal managed to find the back of the net.

Just over six minutes into the third, Tech's chances dwindled when senior Eric Gotz fumbled the puck in his own zone. Before anyone else could get to it, Kyler Kleven pounced on the biscuit, took a few strides towards the MTU goal, and fired the puck over Blake Pietila shoulder. Michigan Tech increased their offensive output afterwards but were unable to solve Ryan Fanti, who posted his third consecutive shutout. Kobe Roth, who opened the scoring, capped off the game with a empty-net goal and saw Minnesota Duluth advance for the seventh straight tournament.

==== Regional Final ====
March 26, 2022; 2:00 PM	(1) Denver	2 – 1 (1–1, 0–0, 1–0)	(2) Minnesota Duluth	Budweiser Events Center; Attendance: 4,812

Game reference

Magnus Chrona
Goalies
Ryan Fanti
Referees:
Colin Kronforst
Sean Fernandez
Linesmen:
Justin Cornell
Pat Richardson

	0–1	14:40 – Darian Gotz (2) (Roth, Bender)
(Brink) Cole Guttman (19) – 17:24	1–1
(Behrens, Guttman) Carter Savoie (22) – GW – 53:44	2–1

8 min
Penalties
8 min
34
Shots
25

Game summary
Looking for a measure of revenge after losing in the conference semifinal to Duluth, Denver came out flying. The Pioneers spent most of the first 15 minutes in the Bulldogs' zone and earned several good scoring opportunities, but Ryan Fanti remained a wall in the net. Instead, it was Duluth who scored a seeing-eye goal on just their second shot of the period. A few minutes later, however, Denver captain Cole Guttman picked up a loose puck high in the Duluth zone and shot it towards the goal. As it went between Matt Anderson's legs, the shot was both screened and deflected and Fanti didn't move until it was in the net. The goal ended Fanti's shutout streak at 225:03.

The play evened out in the second as both teams continued their physical play. Near the middle of the period, Denver got into penalty trouble when they took consecutive penalties and gave UMD a 5-on-3 power play. The Pioneers managed to kill off the disadvantage and then went on the attack. Denver spent much of the second half of the period in Duluth's end but the Bulldogs' defense kept most of the shots to the outside.

Denver and Duluth traded chances for most of the third period but their respective netminders kept playing up to the moment. With just over 6 minutes left in regulation, Sean Behrens fired a puck from the blue line but missed wide. Fanti had attempted to grab the puck but it was so far away from the net that it drew him out to the side. After it eluded his glove, the puck bounced off of the glass strait back towards the front of the net. Before he could get out of the way, it struck Fanti in the skate and he inadvertently kicked it across the goal line. The puck struck the far post and bounced out, however, Carter Savoie was standing in perfect position and deflected the puck back towards the goal. It then careened off of Fanti's leg, as he was trying to slide back into position, and rolled into the net. Duluth was eventually forced to pull their goalie to try and tie the game but, after Kobe Roth missed a half-open net, Koby Bender had to take an interference penalty to prevent a sure empty-net goal. The now-shorthanded Bulldogs were held off and Denver took the game to advance to the Frozen Four.

=== Frozen Four – Boston, Massachusetts ===
==== National semifinals ====
April 7, 2022; 5:00 PM	(MW1) Michigan	2 – 3 (OT) (0–1, 1–0, 1–1, 0–1)	(W1) Denver	TD Garden; Attendance: 17,850

Game reference

Erik Portillo
Goalies
Magnus Chrona
Referees:
Joe Carusone
CJ Hanafin
Linesmen:
Ryan Knapp
Brian Oliver

	0–1	11:22 – Brett Stapley (17) (Barrow, Lee)
(Moyle, Van Wyhe) Jimmy Lambert (6) – 24:03	1–1
	1–2	45:36 – Cameron Wright (22) (Benning, Rizzo)
(Pastujov, Estapa) Thomas Bordeleau (12) – 49:09	2–2
	2–3	74:53 – GW – Carter Savoie (23) (Brink, Benning)

6 min
Penalties
0 min
21
Shots
33

Game summary

April 7, 2022; 8:30 PM	(E1) Minnesota State	5 – 1 (0–1, 2–0, 3–0)	(NE2) Minnesota	TD Garden; Attendance: 17,850

Game reference

Dryden McKay
Goalies
Justen Close
Referees:
Ryan Sweeney
Michael Schubert
Linesmen:
Anthony Valle
Shane Kanaly

	0–1	09:00 – Matthew Knies (15) (Brodzinski)
(Sowder, Pavel) Benton Maass (6) – 27:22	1–1
(Silye, Livingstone) Reggie Lutz (15) – GW – 33:31	2–1
(McNeely, Groll) Ondřej Pavel (12) – 41:57	3–1
(Morton) David Silye (8) – 53:17	4–1
(unassisted) Brendan Furry (13) – EN – 58:51	5–1

0 min
Penalties
0 min
32
Shots
17

Game summary
From the start of the game, Minnesota State used the same formula that had worked so well for them all season; the team was on continual attack, hemming Minnesota in their own zone and preventing the Gophers from generating much offense. Despite than, however, a turnover at their own blueline led to a 2-on-0 for Minnesota that resulted in the first goal of the game. The Mavericks did not seem deterred either by being behind or with their inability to beat Justen Close in the first period and maintained to their harrying assault afterwards.

While the shot total was closer in the middle frame, the balance of play remained decidedly in Minnesota State's favor. The Mavericks finally got on the board when Benton Maass came out from behind the net and fired the puck far side along the ice. Five minutes later, MSU took their first lead of the game after a second wrap-around, this time from Reggie Lutz. As the game progressed, it became apparent that the referees were loathe to call penalties and neither team was charged with an infraction despite several instances where both the teams and fans clamored for a whistle.

Minnesota entered the third needing to change the momentum but the Gophers could never keep the puck in the offensive zone long enough to threaten the Mavericks. Their task became all the more difficult when Ondřej Pavel deflected a point shot past Close two minutes into the third. Even with a 2-goal lead, Minnesota State's offense didn't pull back and outperformed the Gophers for most of the third. A perfectly placed shot by David Silye found the top corner of the net and, with less than seven minutes to play, Minnesota tried to fid some way to get back into the game. The Gophers were forced to pull their goalie with four minutes remaining and the additional player did help Minnesota pressure the MSU cage but they could not get the puck past Dryden McKay. Eventually the inevitable happened and Minnesota State was able to get the puck on a break towards the vacated net. Brendan Furry's empty-netter put the final nail in the Gopher's coffin and sent the Mavericks to their first Division I championship game.

==== National Championship ====
April 9, 2022; 8:00 PM	(E1) Minnesota State	1–5 (1–0, 0–0, 0–5)	(W1) Denver	TD Garden; Attendance: 17,850

Game reference
Referees: Geno Binda Jr. Jeremy Tufts; Linesmen: Bill Kingdon; Kevin Briganti

Scoring summary
Period	Team	Goal	Assist(s)	Time	Score
1st	MSU	Sam Morton (9) – PP	Sowder and Sandelin	13:59	1–0 MSU
2nd	None				
3rd	DEN	Ryan Barrow (8)	Benning and Devine	44:46	1–1
3rd	DEN	Michael Benning (15) – GW	Buium and Wright	47:33	2–1 DEN
3rd	DEN	Massimo Rizzo (12)	Mazur and Lee	53:34	3–1 DEN
3rd	DEN	Brett Stapley (18) – EN	unassisted	57:28	4–1 DEN
3rd	DEN	Cameron Wright (23) – EN	Mazur	58:00	5–1 DEN
Penalty summary
Period	Team	Player	Penalty	Time	PIM
1st	DEN	Michael Benning	Tripping	12:23	2:00
1st	MSU	Nathan Smith	Roughing	15:28	2:00
2nd	MSU	Bench	Too many men on the ice	27:07	2:00
3rd	MSU	Sam Morton	Tripping	45:26	2:00

Shots by period
Team	1	2	3	T
Denver	3	5	12	20
Minnesota State	8	10	10	28

Goaltenders
Team	Name	Saves	Goals against	Time on ice
DEN	Magnus Chrona	27	1	60:00
MSU	Dryden McKay	15	3	58:22

Game summary

== All-Tournament team ==
- G: Magnus Chrona (Denver)
- D: Michael Benning* (Denver)
- D: Jack McNeely (Minnesota State)
- F: Carter Savoie (Denver)
- F: Ryan Barrow (Denver)
- F: Sam Morton (Minnesota State)

* Most Outstanding Player(s)

== Record by conference ==
Conference	Bids	Record	Win %	Regional Finals	Frozen Four	Championship Game	Champions
NCHC	5	5–4	.556	3	1	1	1
CCHA	2	3–2	.600	1	1	1	–
Big Ten	3	5–3	.625	3	2	–	–
ECAC Hockey	2	1–2	.333	1	–	–	–
Hockey East	3	0–3	.000	–	–	–	–
Atlantic Hockey	1	0–1	.000	–	–	–	–

== Media ==
=== Television ===
ESPN has US television rights to all games during the tournament for the seventeenth consecutive year. ESPN will air every game, beginning with the regionals, on ESPN2, ESPNews, or ESPNU. Additionally all matches will be streamed online via the ESPN app.

==== Broadcast assignments ====
Regionals

- East Regional: Ben Holden and Dave Starman – Albany, New York
- West Regional: Dan Kelly and Paul Caponigri – Loveland, Colorado
- Midwest Regional: Clay Matvick and Sean Ritchlin – Allentown, Pennsylvania
- Northeast Regional: John Buccigross, Barry Melrose, and Colby Cohen – Worcester, Massachusetts

Frozen Four

- John Buccigross, Barry Melrose, and Colby Cohen – Boston, Massachusetts

=== Radio ===
Westwood One has exclusive radio rights to the Frozen Four and will broadcast both the semifinals and the championship.

- Brian Tripp, Dave Starman, and Shireen Saski
