= Lafontaine (surname) =

Lafontaine is a French topographic surname for someone who lived near a spring or well.

Notable people with the name Lafontaine or La Fontaine include:

- Allan La Fontaine (1910–1999), Australian rules footballer
- Andrea LaFontaine (born 1987), American politician
- Antoine Ménard, dit Lafontaine (1744–1825), building contractor and politician in Lower Canada
- August Lafontaine (1758–1831), German novelist
- Charles Lafontaine (1803–1892), Swiss mesmerist
- De Lafontaine (1655–1738), French ballerina
- Denis La Fontaine (1929–2011), Chief of Air Staff of the Indian Air Force
- Don LaFontaine (1940–2008), American voice-over actor
- Eugène Lafontaine (1857–1935), lawyer, educator, judge and politician
- Fernand Lafontaine (1922–2010), Canadian politician
- Francis La Fontaine (1810–1847), chief of the Miami tribe
- Franz Leopold Lafontaine (1756–1812), German military surgeon
- Gary LaFontaine (1945–2002), American fly fisherman and author
- Henri La Fontaine (1854–1943), Belgian jurist and Nobel Peace Prize laureate
- Herb LaFontaine (fl. 1951–1953), Canadian ice hockey player
- Hilary La Fontaine (1937–2012), Kenyan-born British intelligence officer
- Ida LaFontaine (born 1997), Swedish singer
- Jacques de Lafontaine de Belcour (1704–1765), French entrepreneur
- Jean La Fontaine (born 1931), British anthropologist and academic
- John LaFontaine (born 1990), Canadian lacrosse player
- Joseph Lafontaine (disambiguation)
  - Joseph Lafontaine (Berthier MLA) (1865–1920), Canadian farmer and politician
  - Joseph Lafontaine (Shefford MLA) (1829–1907), Canadian notary, journalist and politician
  - Joseph Lafontaine (Quebec MP) (1885–1965), merchant and politician
- Laurent-David Lafontaine (1823–1892), Canadian physician and politician
- Léonie La Fontaine (1857–1949), Belgian pioneering feminist and pacifist
- Louis-Hippolyte Lafontaine (1807–1864), Canadian politician
- Lyse Lafontaine (born 1942), Canadian film producer
- Marie-Jo Lafontaine (1950–2026), Belgian sculptor and video artist
- Oskar Lafontaine (born 1943), German politician
- Pablo Lafontaine (fl. 2001–2005), Puerto Rican politician
- Pat LaFontaine (born 1965), ice hockey player
- Pierre Dewey LaFontaine Jr. (1930–2016), American jazz clarinetist known professionally as Pete Fountain
- Pietro La Fontaine (1860–1935), Italian cardinal of the Roman Catholic Church
- Rita Lafontaine (1939–2016), Canadian actor
- W. Lafontaine (1796–1859), 19th-century French playwright
- Yves Lafontaine (born 1959; 1841–1921), wife of Canadian Prime Minister Sir Wilfrid Laurier

== See also ==
- Lafontaine baronets
- Lafontaine Island, Australia
- La Fontaine (disambiguation)
- Lafontaine (disambiguation)
- De la fontaine (disambiguation)
- Fontaine (disambiguation)
