= Fontaine (surname) =

Fontaine is a French topographic surname for someone who lived near a spring or well. It was originally found in northern and central France. Variants of Fontaine include Fountain, La Fontaine, Lafontaine, and de La Fontaine. Notable people with the name include:

== Academics ==
- Arturo Fontaine Talavera (born 1952), Chilean writer and political philosopher
- Bertha V. Fontaine (1929–1986), American home economist
- Carole R. Fontaine (born 1950), American biblical scholar
- Godfrey of Fontaines (fl. 1250–1306), medieval philosopher
- Hippolyte Fontaine (1833–1910), French engineer, developer of dynamo
- Jean Fontaine (1936–2021), French writer and theologian
- Jean-Marc Fontaine (1944–2019), French mathematician
- Kathleen Fontaine (born 1962), American physicist and ethicist
- Nora Fontaine Davidson (1836–1929), American schoolteacher, inspired US Memorial Day
- Richard Maury (1882–1950), American naturalized Argentine engineer
- William Fontaine (1909–1968), American philosopher

== Artists ==
- Anne Fontaine (born 1959), Luxembourger filmmaker
- Anne Fontaine (designer) (born 1971), Paris-based fashion designer
- Brigitte Fontaine (born 1939), French singer and musician
- Claudia Fontaine (1960–2018), British backing singer
- Cynthia Lee Fontaine (born 1981), Puerto Rican drag queen
- Dick Fontaine, English documentary filmmaker
- Eddie Fontaine (1927–1992), American actor and rockabilly singer
- Eva Fontaine (born 1974), British actress
- Francis Fontaine (1845–1901), American poet and novelist
- Frank Fontaine (1920–1978), American comedian and singer
- Jacquelynne Fontaine (born 1982), American opera singer, actress, Miss California 2006
- Joan Fontaine (1917−2013), British American actress
- Lilian Fontaine (1886–1975), British actress
- Lily Fontaine (born 1997), English musician
- Madeline Fontaine, French costumer designer
- Nasio Fontaine, Dominican reggae musician
- Oliver W. Fontaine (fl. 1900–1967), American architect
- Paul Fontaine, American painter
- Pierre Fontaine (composer) (c. 1380–1450), French composer
- Pierre-François-Léonard Fontaine (1762–1853), French architect
- Stéphane Fontaine, French cinematographer

== Athletes ==
- Audrey Fontaine (born 1992), French badminton player
- Chris Fontaine (born 1981), American stock car racing driver
- Del Fontaine (1904–1935), Canadian boxer executed for murder
- Emile Fontaine (footballer), French footballer
- Gunnarwolfe Fontaine (born 2000), American ice hockey player
- Isaac Fontaine (born 1975), American basketball player
- Just Fontaine (1933–2023), French football player
- Justin Fontaine (hockey player) (born 1987), Canadian ice hockey player
- Len Fontaine (1948–2019), Canadian ice hockey player
- Lia Monica Fontaine (born 2009), Canadian gymnast
- Liam Fontaine (born 1986), English football player
- Michel Fontaine (sport shooter) (1934–2005), French sports shooter
- Nicolas Fontaine (skier) (born 1970), Canadian freestyle skier
- Pamela Fontaine (born 1964), American Paralympic table tennis player
- Raymond Fontaine (born 1980), Canadian football player
- Robert Fontaine (born 1980), French chess grandmaster
- Yvette Fontaine (born 1946), Belgian racing driver

== Military ==
- A. M. de Fontaine (1838–1885), French adventurer, soldier, and policeman
- James Fontaine (1757–1790), American Revolutionary War officer
- Lamar Fontaine (1829–1921), American soldier, surveyor, poet and author
- Matthew Fontaine Maury (1806–1873), American astronomer, navy officer, historian
- Yvonne Fontaine (1913–1996), French worker for Special Operations Executive

== Politicians ==
- Adélard Fontaine (1892–1967), Canadian politician
- Gabriel Fontaine (born 1940), Canadian politician
- George Fontaine (born 1960), American politician
- Henri Fontaine (1924–2020), French Roman Catholic missionary
- Jerry Fontaine, Canadian politician
- John Fontaine (1792–1866), first mayor of Columbus, Georgia, US
- Joseph-Éloi Fontaine (1865–1930), physician and political figure in Quebec
- Juan Andrés Fontaine (born 1954), Chilean politician
- Maurice Fontaine (1919–2015), French politician
- Michel Fontaine (French politician) (1952–2025), French radiologist and politician
- Nicole Fontaine, French politician
- Peter Fontaine (1691–1797), English clergyman
- Phil Fontaine (born 1944), Aboriginal Canadian leader
- René Fontaine (1933–2012), Canadian politician
- Serge Fontaine (born 1947), Canadian politician

== Other ==
- Tina Fontaine (1999–2014), Canadian murder victim

== Fictional characters ==
- Frank Fontaine, fictional character in the 2007 video game BioShock
- Furina de Fontaine, a character from the video game Genshin Impact
- Dr. Harlan Fontaine, fictional character in the 2011 video game L.A. Noire
- Trip Fontaine, fiction character from the 1999 movie The Virgin Suicides
- Vic Fontaine, fictional, holographic nightclub singer in Star Trek: Deep Space Nine

== See also ==
- La Fontaine (surname), including Lafontaine
- De la fontaine (disambiguation), including a list of people with the surname
- Fontaine (disambiguation)
