= Fontaine =

== Places ==
=== France ===
- Beaulieu-les-Fontaines, in the Oise département
- Bierry-les-Belles-Fontaines, in the Yonne département
- Cailloux-sur-Fontaines, in the Rhône département
- Druyes-les-Belles-Fontaines, in the Yonne département
- Fontaine, Aube, in the Aube département
- Fontaine, Isère, in the Isère département
- Fontaine, Territoire de Belfort, in the Territoire de Belfort département
- Fontaine-au-Bois, in the Nord département
- Fontaine-au-Pire, in the Nord département
- Fontaine-Bellenger, in the Eure département
- Fontaine-Bonneleau, in the Oise département
- Fontaine-Chaalis, in the Oise département
- Fontaine-Chalendray, in the Charente-Maritime département
- Fontaine-Couverte, in the Mayenne département
- Fontaine-de-Vaucluse, in the Vaucluse département
- Fontaine de Vaucluse (spring), in the Vaucluse department
- Fontaine-Denis-Nuisy, in the Marne département
- Fontaine-en-Bray, in the Seine-Maritime département
- Fontaine-en-Dormois, in the Marne département
- Fontaine-Étoupefour, in the Calvados département
- Fontaine-Fourches, in the Seine-et-Marne département
- Fontaine-Française, in the Côte-d'Or département

=== Other countries ===
- Fontaine, Arkansas, US, an unincorporated community

=== Fictional countries ===
- Fontaine (Genshin Impact), a fictional country in Genshin Impact

== Other ==
- Fontaine (surname)
- Fontaine (band), Canadian folk-rock band formerly known as Indian City
- Fontaine (Charleroi Metro), a metro station in Fontaine-l'Évêque, Belgium

== See also ==
- Fontaines (disambiguation)
- Fontane, a surname
- Fountaine, a surname
- Fountain (disambiguation)
- Lafontaine (disambiguation)
- La Fontaine (disambiguation)
- De la fontaine (disambiguation), including a list of people with the surname
