= Mikael Hakkarainen =

Finnish ice hockey player

- Born: January 26, 1998 (age 28) Helsinki, Finland
- Height: 6 ft 0 in (183 cm)
- Weight: 194 lb (88 kg; 13 st 12 lb)
- Position: Center
- Shot: Left
- Played for: Rockford IceHogs; TPS; Västerås IK
- NHL draft: 139th overall, 2018; Chicago Blackhawks
- Playing career: 2019–2022

Mikael Hakkarainen (born January 26, 1998) is a Finnish former professional ice hockey player.

== Playing career ==
Hakkarainen began his career in the youth system of the Espoo Blues, playing for a variety of their U16 and U18 teams, before entering the North American junior hockey system in 2015 with the Brookings Blizzard of the Tier II North American Hockey League (NAHL).

Hakkarainen, after a brief stint with the Chicago Steel of the Tier I United States Hockey League (USHL), spent the following three seasons with the Muskegon Lumberjacks of the USHL, posting 111 points in 126 games; during this time, he was selected in the fifth round of the 2019 NHL entry draft by the Chicago Blackhawks. During his tenure with the Lumberjacks, Hakkarainen briefly played collegiate hockey for the Providence Friars, but returned to Muskegon after just one game. After the conclusion of his time in Muskegon, Hakkarainen signed his three-year, entry-level contract with the Blackhawks on May 6, 2019.

After two seasons within Chicago's minor league system, Hakkarainen was traded to the Vegas Golden Knights on July 27, 2021, in exchange for goaltender Marc-Andre Fleury. Hakkarainen gained a degree of notoriety from the trade as its small return, in comparison to Fleury, the reigning Vezina Trophy winner, who was traded as part of the Golden Knights' salary cap cost-cutting.

Shortly afterwards, Hakkarainen was placed on waivers for the purpose of mutual contract termination on August 18, 2021. Hakkarainen subsequently cleared waivers, was released, and signed with TPS of the Finnish Liiga.

After five games with TPS, Hakkarainen signed with Västerås IK of the HockeyAllsvenskan, finishing out the 2021–22 season before departing the team afterwards.

Hakkarainen then announced his retirement from hockey on September 5, 2022, citing a diagnosis of congenital heart disease discovered during the offseason.

== Career statistics ==
			Regular season					Playoffs
Season	Team	League	GP	G	A	Pts	PIM	GP	G	A	Pts	PIM
2013–14	Blues	FIN U18	3	0	2	2	0	–	–	–	–	–
2013–14	Blues Akatemia	FIN U18	5	0	2	2	0	–	–	–	–	–
2014–15	Blues	FIN U18	43	21	30	51	6	9	3	1	4	4
2015–16	Brookings Blizzard	NAHL	54	13	27	40	10	4	2	0	2	2
2016–17	Chicago Steel	USHL	16	0	4	4	2	–	–	–	–	–
2016–17	Muskegon Lumberjacks	USHL	32	9	5	14	8	2	0	0	0	0
2017–18	Muskegon Lumberjacks	USHL	36	15	31	46	16	3	0	1	1	0
2018–19	Muskegon Lumberjacks	USHL	42	19	28	47	22	8	4	5	9	12
2018–19	Providence Friars	HE	1	0	0	0	0	–	–	–	–	–
2019–20	Rockford IceHogs	AHL	8	0	0	0	0	–	–	–	–	–
2019–20	Indy Fuel	ECHL	3	2	2	4	2	–	–	–	–	–
2020–21	Rockford IceHogs	AHL	6	0	0	0	2	–	–	–	–	–
2020–21	Indy Fuel	ECHL	6	0	1	1	2	–	–	–	–	–
2021–22	TPS	Liiga	1	0	0	0	0	–	–	–	–	–
2021–22	Västerås IK	Allsv	26	3	11	14	2	–	–	–	–	–
Liiga totals			1	0	0	0	0	–	–	–	–	–
AHL totals			14	0	0	0	2	–	–	–	–	–
