= De la fontaine =

De la fontaine, De Lafontaine or Delafontaine may refer to:

- Mademoiselle De Lafontaine, also known as La Fontaine, (1655–1738), French ballerina regarded as the first female professional ballet dancer
- Agathe de La Fontaine (born 1972), French actress
- Benoît Mottet de La Fontaine (1745–1820), French officer in the navy and colonies ministry
- Christophe de la Fontaine (born 1976), industrial designer working and living in Germany
- Edmond de la Fontaine (1823–1891), Luxembourgish jurist, poet, and lyricist
- Gaspard-Théodore-Ignace de la Fontaine (1787–1871), Luxembourgish politician and jurist
- Jacques de Lafontaine de Belcour (1704–1765), French entrepreneur involved in various business ventures in New France
- Jean de La Fontaine (1621–1695), French fabulist and one of the most widely read French poets of the 17th century
- Léon de la Fontaine (1819–1892), Luxembourgish lawyer, politician and botanist
- Marc Delafontaine (1837–1911), Swiss chemist who in 1878, along with Jacques-Louis Soret, first observed holmium spectroscopically
- Nicholas de la Fontaine, Protestant refugee in Geneva and secretary of John Calvin
- Pierre-Maximilien Delafontaine (1777–1860), French painter
- Robert le Maçon, Sieur de la Fontaine (c. 1534–1611), French Reformed minister and diplomat.

== See also ==
- De Lafontaine (1655–1738), French ballerina
- Del Fontaine (1904–1935), Canadian boxer
- Château de la Fontaine (disambiguation)
- Fontaineece, a surname
- La Fontaine (disambiguation)
- Lafontaine (disambiguation)
