= Fontaines =

Fontaines may refer to the following places in France:

- Fontaines, Saône-et-Loire, in the Saône-et-Loire département
- Fontaines, Vendée, in the Vendée département
- Fontaines, Yonne, in the Yonne département
- Fontaines-d'Ozillac, in the Charente-Maritime département
- Fontaines-en-Duesmois, in the Côte-d'Or département
- Fontaines-en-Sologne, in the Loir-et-Cher département
- Fontaines-les-Sèches, in the Côte-d'Or département
- Fontaines-Saint-Clair, in the Meuse département
- Fontaines-Saint-Martin, in the Rhône département
- Fontaines-sur-Marne, in the Haute-Marne département
- Fontaines-sur-Saône, in the Rhône département
- Grandchamps-des-Fontaines, in the Loire-Atlantique département
- Nouans-les-Fontaines, in the Indre-et-Loire département
- Pernes-les-Fontaines, in the Vaucluse département
- Perrogney-les-Fontaines, in the Haute-Marne département
- Saint-Génis-des-Fontaines, in the Pyrénées-Orientales département
- Saint-Malo-des-Trois-Fontaines, in the Morbihan département
- Saint-Martin-des-Fontaines, in the Vendée département
- Trois-Fontaines-l'Abbaye, in the Marne département

Fontaines is the name or part of the name of the following municipalities in Switzerland:

- Fontaines, Switzerland, canton of Neuchâtel
- Fontaines-sur-Grandson, canton of Vaud, Switzerland

Fontaines, former name of Irish rock band Fontaines D.C.

== See also ==
- Fontaine (disambiguation)
- Fontaineece, a surname
