= Brett Murray (ice hockey) =

Canadian ice hockey player

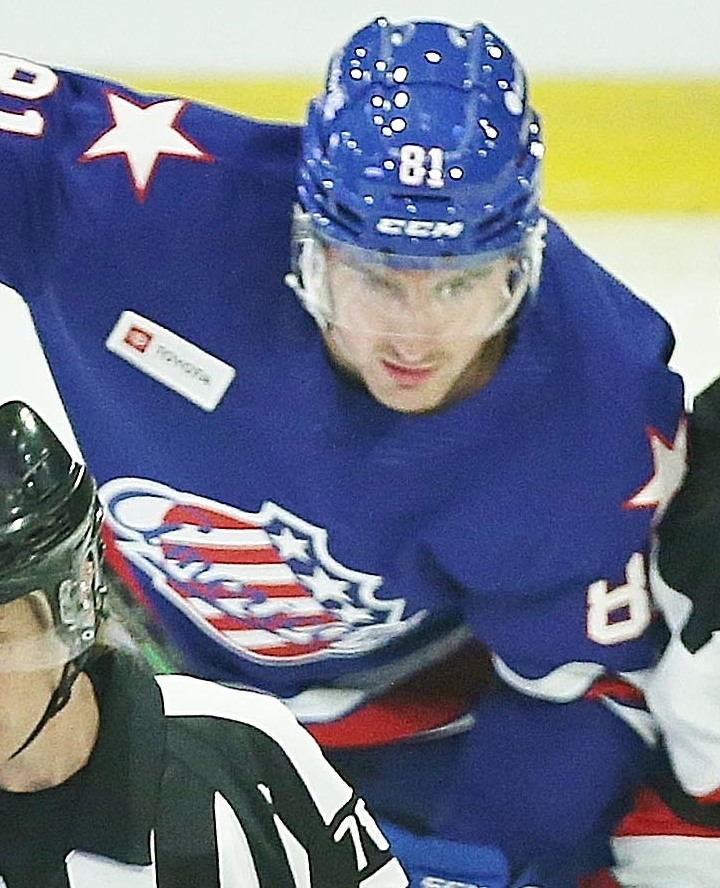
- Murray with the Rochester Americans in 2021
- Born: July 20, 1998 (age 28) Bolton, Ontario, Canada
- Height: 6 ft 5 in (196 cm)
- Weight: 228 lb (103 kg; 16 st 4 lb)
- Position: Left wing
- Shoots: Left
- KHL team Former teams: Shanghai Dragons; Buffalo Sabres; Nürnberg Ice Tigers
- NHL draft: 99th overall, 2016; Buffalo Sabres
- Playing career: 2019–present

Brett Murray (born July 20, 1998) is a Canadian professional ice hockey left wing who currently plays for the Shanghai Dragons of the Kontinental Hockey League (KHL). He previously played for the Buffalo Sabres of the National Hockey League (NHL) and the Nürnberg Ice Tigers in the Deutsche Eishockey Liga (DEL).

== Playing career ==
=== Junior ===
Murray played for the Carleton Place Canadians of the Central Canada Hockey League (CCHL), where he won a league championship in the 2015–16 season.

Murray led the United States Hockey League (USHL) in goals in the 2018–19 season, scoring 41 for the Youngstown Phantoms. He was second in the league in points with 76, and was named to the league's First Team at the end of the season.

=== College ===
Murray joined the Penn State Nittany Lions at the beginning of 2017, spending the back half of 2016-17 and returning for 2017–18 before returning to the USHL.

=== Professional ===
Murray was drafted in the fourth round, 99th overall by the Buffalo Sabres in the 2016 NHL entry draft.

The Sabres signed him to a one-year AHL contract to play with the Rochester Americans in 2019–20. The team then signed him to a two-year entry-level contract ahead of the 2020–21 season.

Murray was signed to a one-year, two-way contract extension with the Sabres for the 2024–25 season on July 1, 2024.

On October 16, 2025, Murray signed a one-year contract with the Nürnberg Ice Tigers of the Deutsche Eishockey Liga.

After performing well in Nürnberg, Murray garnered interest from many European teams, particularly German champions Eisbären Berlin. On June 20, 2026, Murray signed a one-year contract with the Shanghai Dragons in the Kontinental Hockey League.

== Career statistics ==
			Regular season					Playoffs
Season	Team	League	GP	G	A	Pts	PIM	GP	G	A	Pts	PIM
2015–16	Carleton Place Canadians	CCHL	48	14	32	46	16	16	5	8	13	4
2016–17	Youngstown Phantoms	USHL	27	7	13	20	22	—	—	—	—	—
2016–17	Penn State U.	B1G	12	0	1	1	4	—	—	—	—	—
2017–18	Penn State U.	B1G	21	1	5	6	23	—	—	—	—	—
2018–19	Youngstown Phantoms	USHL	62	41	35	76	35	2	1	0	1	0
2019–20	Rochester Americans	AHL	55	9	15	24	10	—	—	—	—	—
2020–21	Rochester Americans	AHL	27	9	11	20	23	—	—	—	—	—
2020–21	Buffalo Sabres	NHL	2	0	0	0	0	—	—	—	—	—
2021–22	Rochester Americans	AHL	52	15	17	32	35	10	3	3	6	4
2021–22	Buffalo Sabres	NHL	19	2	4	6	23	—	—	—	—	—
2022–23	Rochester Americans	AHL	71	23	26	49	46	14	4	6	10	13
2023–24	Rochester Americans	AHL	54	17	15	32	36	2	1	0	1	0
2023–24	Buffalo Sabres	NHL	2	0	0	0	2	—	—	—	—	—
2024–25	Rochester Americans	AHL	66	27	22	49	29	8	0	0	0	4
2024–25	Buffalo Sabres	NHL	3	0	0	0	0	—	—	—	—	—
2025–26	Nürnberg Ice Tigers	DEL	38	17	16	33	10	2	0	0	0	0
NHL totals			26	2	4	6	25	—	—	—	—	—

== Awards and honours ==
Award	Year
CCHL
All-Rookie Team	2016
Top Prospect Award	2016
Champion (Carleton Place Canadians)	2016
USHL
First All-Star Team	2019
