= Château de la Fontaine =

Château de la Fontaine may refer to:

- Château de la Fontaine (Anse)
- Château de la Fontaine (Brétigny-sur-Orge)
- Château de La Fontaine (Loiret)
- Château de la Fontaine-du-Houx
- Château de la Montagne
