= Egor Afanasyev =

Russian ice hockey player (born 2001)

- Born: 23 January 2001 (age 25) Tver, Russia
- Height: 6 ft 4 in (193 cm)
- Weight: 211 lb (96 kg; 15 st 1 lb)
- Position: Left wing
- Shoots: Left
- KHL team Former teams: Avangard Omsk; CSKA Moscow; Nashville Predators
- NHL draft: 45th overall, 2019; Nashville Predators
- Playing career: 2020–present

Egor Yurievich Afanasyev (Russian: Егор Юрьевич Афанасьев; born 23 January 2001) is a Russian professional ice hockey winger currently playing for Avangard Omsk of the Kontinental Hockey League (KHL). He was selected in the second round of the 2019 NHL entry draft, 45th overall, by the Nashville Predators.

== Playing career ==
Afanasyev as a Moscow native began his junior development by moving to North America and playing in Michigan with Little Caesers under-16 team in the HPHL before he was selected 156th overall in the 2017 USHL Fuutres Draft by the Muskegon Lumberjacks.

In his second season with the Lumberjacks in 2018–19 season, developing as a large-framed winger that could overpower defenders, he led Muskegon with 27 goals and 35 assists for 62 points and was named to the USHL's Third All-Star team. On the back of his impressive season, Afanasyev was then selected by the Nashville Predators in the second-round, 45th overall, of the 2019 NHL entry draft.

Continuing his career in the North America, Afanasyev moved to Canada to play major junior hockey with the Windsor Spitfires of the Ontario Hockey League (OHL) for the 2019–20 season. Signing with the Spitfires after the club had previously acquired his rights from the Ottawa 67's, Afanasyev instantly made an impact with the team in notching a team leading 31 goals and co-leading alongside Tyler Angle with 67 points in just 62 regular season games. He was signed by the Predators during his tenure with the Spitfires, agreeing to a three-year, entry-level contract on 20 October 2019. With the playoffs cancelled due to the COVID-19 pandemic, Afanasyev's tenure with the Spitfires ended following the subsequent cancellation of the following 2020–21 season.

In order to continue his development, Afanasyev returned to his native Russia, securing a one-year contract with perennial contending Kontinental Hockey League club, CSKA Moscow on loan from the Predators. He made his professional debut in the 2020–21 season with CSKA, registering an impressive 2 goals and 6 points through limited ice-time in 16 regular season games. He played in all levels of CSKA's organization throughout the season, featuring in the VHL and MHL.

Returning to the Predators for the 2021–22 season, Afanasyev was amongst the last cuts at training camp, assigned to begin his North American professional career with AHL affiliate, the Milwaukee Admirals. In his rookie season, Afanasyev showed his offensive potential in collected 12 goals and 33 points through 74 regular season games.

In his final year of his entry-level contract, Afanasyev continued in the AHL to begin the 2022–23 season. Deployed in a top-six scoring role, Afanasyev later received his first recall to the Nashville Predators on 12 March 2023. He was immediately inserted into the lineup that night and made his NHL debut in a 2–1 shootout victory over the Los Angeles Kings. Afanasyev scored his first NHL goal against Jacob Markström of the Calgary Flames in a 3–2 shootout win on 10 April 2023.

On 23 June 2024, Afanasyev was traded by the Predators to the San Jose Sharks in exchange for Ozzy Wiesblatt. As a restricted free agent with the Sharks, Afanasyev rights were retained after he was tendered a qualifying offer with the club. On 1 August 2024, Afanasyev opted to return to his homeland to continue his career, signing a three-year contract with his original club, CSKA Moscow of the KHL.

On 19 May 2025, the San Jose Sharks announced they had signed Afanasyev to a one-year, $800,000 contract for the 2025–26 season. Returning to North America, Afanasyev played the entirety of his contract with the Sharks with AHL affiliate, the San Jose Barracuda, posting 14 goals and 40 points through 64 regular season games.

With his KHL rights earlier acquired from CSKA to Avangard Omsk, as a pending free agent, Afanasyev returned to Russia in agreeing to a two-year contract with Omsk of the KHL on 1 July 2026.

== Career statistics ==
=== Regular season and playoffs ===
			Regular season					Playoffs
Season	Team	League	GP	G	A	Pts	PIM	GP	G	A	Pts	PIM
2016–17	Little Caesers U16	HPHL	17	5	3	8	17	—	—	—	—	—
2017–18	Muskegon Lumberjacks	USHL	45	6	8	14	16	3	0	2	2	0
2018–19	Muskegon Lumberjacks	USHL	58	27	35	62	36	8	2	4	6	8
2019–20	Windsor Spitfires	OHL	62	31	36	67	40	—	—	—	—	—
2020–21	Krasnaya Armiya	MHL	4	5	1	6	0	4	2	0	2	2
2020–21	CSKA Moscow	KHL	16	2	4	6	2	5	0	0	0	0
2020–21	Zvezda Moscow	VHL	2	0	0	0	0	—	—	—	—	—
2021–22	Milwaukee Admirals	AHL	74	12	21	33	45	5	0	0	0	4
2022–23	Milwaukee Admirals	AHL	57	13	13	26	26	16	5	6	11	10
2022–23	Nashville Predators	NHL	17	1	0	1	2	—	—	—	—	—
2023–24	Milwaukee Admirals	AHL	56	27	27	54	60	15	5	4	9	22
2023–24	Nashville Predators	NHL	2	0	0	0	0	—	—	—	—	—
2024–25	CSKA Moscow	KHL	53	7	14	21	14	6	2	2	4	4
2025–26	San Jose Barracuda	AHL	64	14	26	40	59	2	1	0	1	2
KHL totals			69	9	18	27	16	11	2	2	4	4
NHL totals			19	1	0	1	2	—	—	—	—	—

Medal record

Representing Russia

Men's ice hockey

World Junior Championships
Silver medal – second place	2020 Czech Republic	

=== International ===
Year	Team	Event	Result	GP	G	A	Pts	PIM
2017	Russia	U17	5th	5	2	3	5	0
2021	Russia	WJC	4th	7	2	3	5	0
Junior totals				12	4	6	10	0

== Awards and honours ==
Award	Year
USHL
Third All-Star Team	2019
