= Andre Lee (ice hockey) =

Swedish ice hockey player (born 2000)

- Born: 26 July 2000 (age 26) Karlstad, Sweden
- Height: 6 ft 5 in (196 cm)
- Weight: 206 lb (93 kg; 14 st 10 lb)
- Position: Left wing
- Shoots: Left
- NHL team: Los Angeles Kings
- NHL draft: 188th overall, 2019; Los Angeles Kings
- Playing career: 2022–present

Andre Lee (born 26 July 2000) is a Swedish professional ice hockey left wing currently playing for the Los Angeles Kings of the National Hockey League (NHL).

== Playing career ==
Lee was born and raised in Karlstad, Sweden, and played as a youth with Färjestad BK through to the J20 SuperElit level. Moving to North America, Lee began his amateur junior career with the Sioux Falls Stampede in the United States Hockey League (USHL), before he was selected by the Los Angeles Kings in the seventh round, 188th overall, of the 2019 NHL entry draft.

Lee embarked on a collegiate hockey career with the University of Massachusetts-Lowell of the Hockey East and played three seasons with the River Hawks before signing a two-year, entry-level contract with the Los Angeles Kings on 29 March 2022.

== Personal life ==
Lee was born to an Italian Swedish mother, Maggie Vaccarezza, and an American father, Tommy Lee, a basketball player who grew up in Philadelphia and played for the Loyola Greyhounds basketball team.

Lee is a cousin of Fabian Zetterlund, a forward who plays for the Ottawa Senators.

== Career statistics ==
			Regular season					Playoffs
Season	Team	League	GP	G	A	Pts	PIM	GP	G	A	Pts	PIM
2016–17	Färjestad BK	J20	1	0	0	0	4	—	—	—	—	—
2017–18	Färjestad BK	J20	8	1	0	1	2	1	0	0	0	0
2018–19	Sioux Falls Stampede	USHL	61	20	15	35	59	12	6	5	11	10
2019–20	UMass-Lowell	HE	33	8	12	20	30	—	—	—	—	—
2020–21	UMass-Lowell	HE	20	7	9	16	18	—	—	—	—	—
2021–22	UMass-Lowell	HE	34	16	12	28	50	—	—	—	—	—
2021–22	Ontario Reign	AHL	11	0	2	2	10	—	—	—	—	—
2022–23	Ontario Reign	AHL	58	6	3	9	38	2	0	0	0	2
2023–24	Ontario Reign	AHL	36	8	5	13	23	8	4	0	4	4
2024–25	Los Angeles Kings	NHL	19	1	2	3	11	—	—	—	—	—
2024–25	Ontario Reign	AHL	48	6	14	20	34	2	0	0	0	4
2025–26	Los Angeles Kings	NHL	7	1	1	2	0	—	—	—	—	—
2025–26	Ontario Reign	AHL	65	26	22	48	47	5	1	2	3	14
NHL totals			26	2	3	5	11	—	—	—	—	—

== Awards and honours ==
Award	Year
USHL
Clark Cup (Sioux Falls Stampede)	2019
College
HE Third All-Star Team	2022
