= Lafontaine =

Lafontaine, French for "the fountain", may refer to:

== People ==
- Jean de La Fontaine (1621–1695), French fabulist, one of the most widely read French poets of the 17th century
- De Lafontaine (1655–1738), French ballerina
- Georg Wilhelm Lafontaine (1680–1745), German painter
- Ludolph Lafontaine (1704–1774), German painter
- August Lafontaine (1758–1831), German writer
- Louis-Hippolyte Lafontaine (1807-1864), Canadian politician
- Albert Millaud (1844–1892), French journalist and playwright, who wrote under various pseudonyms, including "Lafontaine"
- Oskar Lafontaine (born 1943), German politician

== Places ==
- Lafontaine, Ontario, Canada
- Lafontaine, Quebec, Canada
- LaFontaine, a provincial electoral district in Quebec, Canada
- Lafontaine, Kansas, U.S.
- La Fontaine, Indiana, U.S.

== Other uses ==
- Lafontaine (electoral district), a former riding in Quebec, Canada
- Lafontaine (surname)
- Lafontaine Bellot, governor of Plaisance, Newfoundland from 1664 to 1667
- 5780 Lafontaine, a minor planet
- Hotel LaFontaine, Huntington, Indiana

== See also ==
- La Fontaine (disambiguation)
- LaFountain, surname
- Fountain (disambiguation)
