= Ondřej Pavel =

Czech ice hockey player (born 2000)

- Born: 29 August 2000 (age 25) Prague, Czech Republic
- Height: 6 ft 2 in (188 cm)
- Weight: 205 lb (93 kg; 14 st 9 lb)
- Position: Center
- Shoots: Left
- Liiga team Former teams: Tappara; Colorado Avalanche
- NHL draft: Undrafted
- Playing career: 2023–present

Ondřej Pavel (born 29 August 2000) is a Czech professional ice hockey forward for Tappara of the Liiga. He has formerly played in the National Hockey League (NHL) with the Colorado Avalanche.

== Playing career ==
=== Amateur ===
Pavel played junior hockey with Prague with youth club HC Kobra Praha before joining HC Sparta Praha junior under-18 team for the 2016–17 season. As a natural center, Pavel showed initial two-way potential in recording 7 goals and 21 points through 27 regular season games. Opting to continue his development in North America, Pavel as a 16-year old joined the Iowa Wild for the remainder of the season in the T1EHL.

Selected in the 2017 NAHL entry draft in the 8th round, 182nd overall, Pavel began his first full junior season in the United States with the Minot Minotauros of the North American Hockey League. He completed the 2017–18 season by posting 8 goals and 18 points in a third-line checking role through 48 regular season games. Showing to be defensively responsible, Pavel collected 6 points through 12 post-season games, and as the youngest player on the Tauros scored the overtime-winner in Game 3 of the Robertson Cup Semi-Final to send the Tauros to the National Championship Game.

Having committed to remain in the United States to play collegiate hockey with Minnesota State University, Mankato Mavericks, Pavel played the following two seasons in the United States Hockey League with the Fargo Force after he was selected in the tenth-round, 162nd overall in the 2018 USHL entry draft. He captained the club in the 2019–20 season and posted 20 points through 40 regular season games before the season was cancelled due to the COVID-19 pandemic. He earned the Tom Clifford Leadership & Dedication Award.

Pavel joined the Mavericks in the Western Collegiate Hockey Association for his freshman year and registered 4 assists through 11 games of the shortened 2020–21 season. With the Mavericks moving to the Central Conference for his sophomore season in 2021–22, Pavel established career highs with 12 goals and 22 points while appearing all 44 games for Minnesota before the team lost in the NCAA Championships to the University of Denver. He was named as the team's most improved player and hardest worker in showing his defensive shutdown capabilities from the center position.

Returning for his junior season in 2022–23, Pavel contributed with 6 goals and 15 points through 39 games. Helping the Mavericks claim consecutive CCHA champion titles, Pavel was selected to the CCHA All-Academic Team. He also represented the Mavericks at the Frozen Four for the second consecutive season.

=== Professional ===
Following a regional semi-final defeat in the NCAA Tournament, Pavel concluded his collegiate career with MSU by signing as an undrafted free agent to a two-year entry-level contract with the Colorado Avalanche of the NHL on 30 March 2023. He immediately joined the Avalanche's AHL affiliate, the Colorado Eagles, on an PTO for the remainder of the 2022–23 season and made his professional debut against the San Diego Gulls on 14 April 2023. He registered his first professional point in the post-season, recording an assist in a 6–4 preliminary series win over the Ontario Reign, on 21 April 2023.

Injured in the lead up to his first training camp with the Avalanche, Pavel returned for the final pre-season games before he was reassigned to begin the 2023–24 season with the Colorado Eagles. After ten games with the Eagles, Pavel received his first recall to the NHL on 7 November 2023. In a fourth-line center role, Pavel made his debut with the Avalanche that night in a 6–3 victory over the New Jersey Devils. Returned to the AHL following the game, Pavel later registered his first professional goal with the Eagles in a 6–3 victory against the Texas Stars on 25 November 2023.

Pavel for the second consecutive season was injured in the pre-season and was reassigned to the Colorado Eagles after returning to health to begin 2024–25 season. Limited to 14 games through continual injury, on 28 December 2024, he was traded by the Avalanche along with a third-round pick in 2027 to divisional rival the Nashville Predators in exchange for Juuso Pärssinen and a 2026 seventh-round pick. Pavel responded in an increased role in his assignment to the Milwaukee Admirals, posting 8 goals and 18 points through 43 regular season games.

Released by the Predators as a free agent after not being tendered a qualifying offer, Pavel was signed to an optional two-year contract with Finnish club, Tappara of the Liiga, on 30 July 2025.

== International play ==
Medal record

Representing Czech Republic

Ice hockey

Ivan Hlinka Memorial Tournament
Silver medal – second place	2017 Czech Republic/Slovakia	

Pavel first represented the Czech Republic at the 2016 World U-17 Hockey Challenge, in an 8th-place finish, posting three goals in 5 contests. Pavel went scoreless in five games as a 16-year old and a member of his country's silver-medal at the 2017 Ivan Hlinka Memorial Tournament.

Pavel was selected to the 2020 World Junior Championships in Ostrava, Czech Republic, where he went scoreless in 5 games with the team en route to a seventh-place finish as hosts of the tournament.

== Career statistics ==
=== Regular season and playoffs ===
			Regular season					Playoffs
Season	Team	League	GP	G	A	Pts	PIM	GP	G	A	Pts	PIM
2016–17	HC Sparta Praha	Czech.18	27	7	14	21	26	—	—	—	—	—
2016–17	Iowa Wild U16	T1EHL	13	7	5	12	4	4	1	0	1	2
2017–18	Minot Minotauros	NAHL	48	8	10	18	68	12	2	4	6	16
2018–19	Fargo Force	USHL	58	4	9	13	71	2	2	0	2	2
2019–20	Fargo Force	USHL	40	11	9	20	51	—	—	—	—	—
2020–21	Minnesota State U. - Mankato	WCHA	11	0	4	4	8	—	—	—	—	—
2021–22	Minnesota State U. - Mankato	CCHA	44	12	10	22	24	—	—	—	—	—
2022–23	Minnesota State U. - Mankato	CCHA	39	6	9	15	34	—	—	—	—	—
2022–23	Colorado Eagles	AHL	2	0	0	0	0	4	0	2	2	0
2023–24	Colorado Eagles	AHL	61	6	4	10	37	2	0	0	0	0
2023–24	Colorado Avalanche	NHL	2	0	0	0	2	—	—	—	—	—
2024–25	Colorado Eagles	AHL	14	0	2	2	16	—	—	—	—	—
2024–25	Milwaukee Admirals	AHL	43	8	10	18	49	2	0	0	0	0
2025–26	Tappara	Liiga	42	6	6	12	105	17	1	1	2	8
NHL totals			2	0	0	0	2	—	—	—	—	—
Liiga totals			42	6	6	12	105	17	1	1	2	8

=== International ===
Year	Team	Event	Result	GP	G	A	Pts	PIM
2016	Czech Republic	U17	8th	5	3	0	3	2
2017	Czech Republic	IH18	2nd place, silver medalist(s)	5	0	0	0	2
2020	Czech Republic	WJC	7th	5	0	0	0	6
Junior totals				15	3	0	3	10
