= La Fontaine (disambiguation) =

Jean de La Fontaine (1621–1695) was a French poet.

La Fontaine may also refer to:

== Places ==
- La Fontaine Park, Montreal, Quebec
- Doué-la-Fontaine, a former commune in Maine-et-Loire, France
- La Fontaine-Saint-Martin, a commune in the Sarthe département, France
- La Fontaine, Indiana, United States

== Other uses ==
- La Fontaine (surname)
- La Fontaine's Fables, the most popular work of Jean de La Fontaine
- La Fontaine Building, an apartment building in West Hollywood, California

== See also ==
- De la fontaine (disambiguation)
- Lafontaine (disambiguation)
- Fontaineece, a surname
- Lycée La Fontaine (disambiguation)
- Fountain (disambiguation)
