= LaFountain =

LaFountain or La Fountain is a surname, an Americanized form of French Lafontaine, a toponymic surname referring to someone who lived near a spring or from any of various places in France named Lafontaine. Notable people with the surname include:

- David LaFountain (fl. 2022–present), American politician
- Michele LaFountain (born 1969), Puerto Rican sports anchor
- Sara La Fountain (born 1981), Finnish-American chef, author, designer and television personality
