= Isaiah Saville =

American ice hockey player (born 2000)

- Born: September 21, 2000 (age 26) Anchorage, Alaska, U.S.
- Height: 6 ft 1 in (185 cm)
- Weight: 200 lb (91 kg; 14 st 4 lb)
- Position: Goaltender
- Catches: Right
- AHL team (P) Cur. team Former teams: Colorado Eagles; New Mexico Goatheads (ECHL); Henderson Silver Knights; Ontario Reign
- NHL draft: 135th overall, 2019; Vegas Golden Knights
- Playing career: 2022–present

Isaiah Saville (born September 21, 2000) is an American professional ice hockey goaltender for the New Mexico Goatheads of the ECHL while under contract to the Colorado Eagles of the American Hockey League (AHL). Saville was selected 135th overall in the fifth round of the 2019 NHL entry draft by the Vegas Golden Knights, playing parts of three seasons in their organization. He previously played junior in the North American Hockey League (NAHL) with the Minnesota Magicians and the United States Hockey League (USHL) with the Tri-City Storm, as well as NCAA collegiate hockey with the Omaha Mavericks.

== Playing career ==
Saville began his youth career in his hometown of Anchorage, before entering the North American junior system with the Colorado Thunderbirds of the Tier 1 Elite Hockey League (T1EHL) in 2016.

He then joined the Minnesota Magicians of the Tier II North American Hockey League (NAHL) for the 2017–18 season, before moving to the Tri-City Storm of the Tier I United States Hockey League (USHL) for 2018–19. During his brief tenure in Tri-City, Saville was named USHL Goaltender of the Year and won the Dave Peterson Award from USA Hockey, ultimately leading the Storm to their second Anderson Cup regular-season title. At the conclusion of his time in Tri-City, Saville was drafted in the fifth round of the 2019 NHL entry draft by the Vegas Golden Knights.

Saville played three seasons of collegiate hockey at the University of Nebraska at Omaha. In his time with the Mavericks, Saville posted a career .907 save percentage and 2.78 goals against average, being named to the National Collegiate Hockey Conference (NCHC) honorable mention All-Star team for 2020–21.

Saville signed his three-year entry-level contract with Vegas on March 18, 2022, and joined Vegas' American Hockey League (AHL) affiliate, the Henderson Silver Knights, shortly thereafter.

Saville was recalled by the Golden Knights multiple times during the 2023–24 season due to injuries, dressing as the backup to Logan Thompson and Jiri Patera; however, he did not appear in any games.

After missing the entire 2024–25 season due to injury, Saville signed a one-year contract with the Ontario Reign, the AHL affiliate of the Los Angeles Kings, on July 17, 2025.

Saville played a lone season within the Reign organization before leaving as a free agent and signing a one-year AHL contract for the 2026–27 season with fellow pacific divisional club, the Colorado Eagles, on September 14, 2026.

== International play ==
Saville made his international debut with the USA Hockey National Team Development Program (USNTDP) at the 2017 Ivan Hlinka Memorial Tournament, appearing in two games. Saville also appeared for the USNTDP in three games at the 2018 World Junior A Challenge, posting a .944 save percentage and 1.30 goals against average en route to a gold medal. Saville was named to the United States roster for the 2020 IIHF World Junior Championships, but did not play.

== Career statistics ==
=== Regular season and playoffs ===
			Regular season									Playoffs
Season	Team	League	GP	W	L	T/OT	MIN	GA	SO	GAA	SV%	GP	W	L	MIN	GA	SO	GAA	SV%
2017–18	Minnesota Magicians	NAHL	41	21	13	1	2313	93	2	2.41	.927	3	0	3	176	10	0	3.42	.911
2018–19	Tri-City Storm	USHL	34	25	4	3	1992	63	4	1.90	.925	6	3	3	—	—	1	2.20	.910
2019–20	University of Nebraska Omaha	NCHC	28	10	11	4	1559	74	1	2.85	.907	—	—	—	—	—	—	—	—
2020–21	University of Nebraska Omaha	NCHC	24	12	11	1	1348	68	1	3.03	.907	—	—	—	—	—	—	—	—
2021–22	University of Nebraska Omaha	NCHC	30	16	14	0	1761	74	4	2.52	.907	—	—	—	—	—	—	—	—
2021–22	Henderson Silver Knights	AHL	8	6	1	0	438	15	0	2.05	.929	—	—	—	—	—	—	—	—
2022–23	Savannah Ghost Pirates	ECHL	33	8	15	6	1806	93	2	3.09	.920	—	—	—	—	—	—	—	—
2022–23	Henderson Silver Knights	AHL	10	4	5	0	542	29	0	3.21	.902	—	—	—	—	—	—	—	—
2023–24	Henderson Silver Knights	AHL	22	7	12	1	1212	66	1	3.27	.893	—	—	—	—	—	—	—	—
2025–26	Ontario Reign	AHL	8	6	1	1	441	14	2	1.91	.916	—	—	—	—	—	—	—	—
2025–26	Greenville Swamp Rabbits	ECHL	29	11	13	3	1638	73	1	2.67	.910	—	—	—	—	—	—	—	—
AHL totals			48	23	19	2	2,633	124	3	2.83	.904	—	—	—	—	—	—	—	—

=== International ===
Year	Team	Event	Result	GP	W	L	T/OT	MIN	GA	SO	GAA	SV%
2017	United States	IH18	5th	2	0	2	0	120	13	0	6.50	.831
2018	United States	WJAC	1st place, gold medalist(s)	3	2	0	1	185	4	1	1.30	.944
2020	United States	WJC	6th	DNP
Junior totals				5	2	2	1	305	17	1	3.90	.888

== Awards and honors ==
Award	Year
NAHL
Second All-Star Team	2018
All-Rookie Second Team	2018
All-Midwest Division Team	2018
All-Midwest Division Rookie Team	2018
Midwest Division Goaltender of the Year	2018
USHL
Dave Peterson Award	2019
Goaltender of the Year	2019
All-USHL First Team	2019
All-Rookie First Team	2019
NCAA Division I – NCHC
Honorable Mention All-Star Team	2021

Awards and achievements
Preceded by Zach Driscoll	Dave Peterson Award; 2018–19	Succeeded by Dustin Wolf
