= Max Crozier =

Canadian ice hockey player (born 2000)

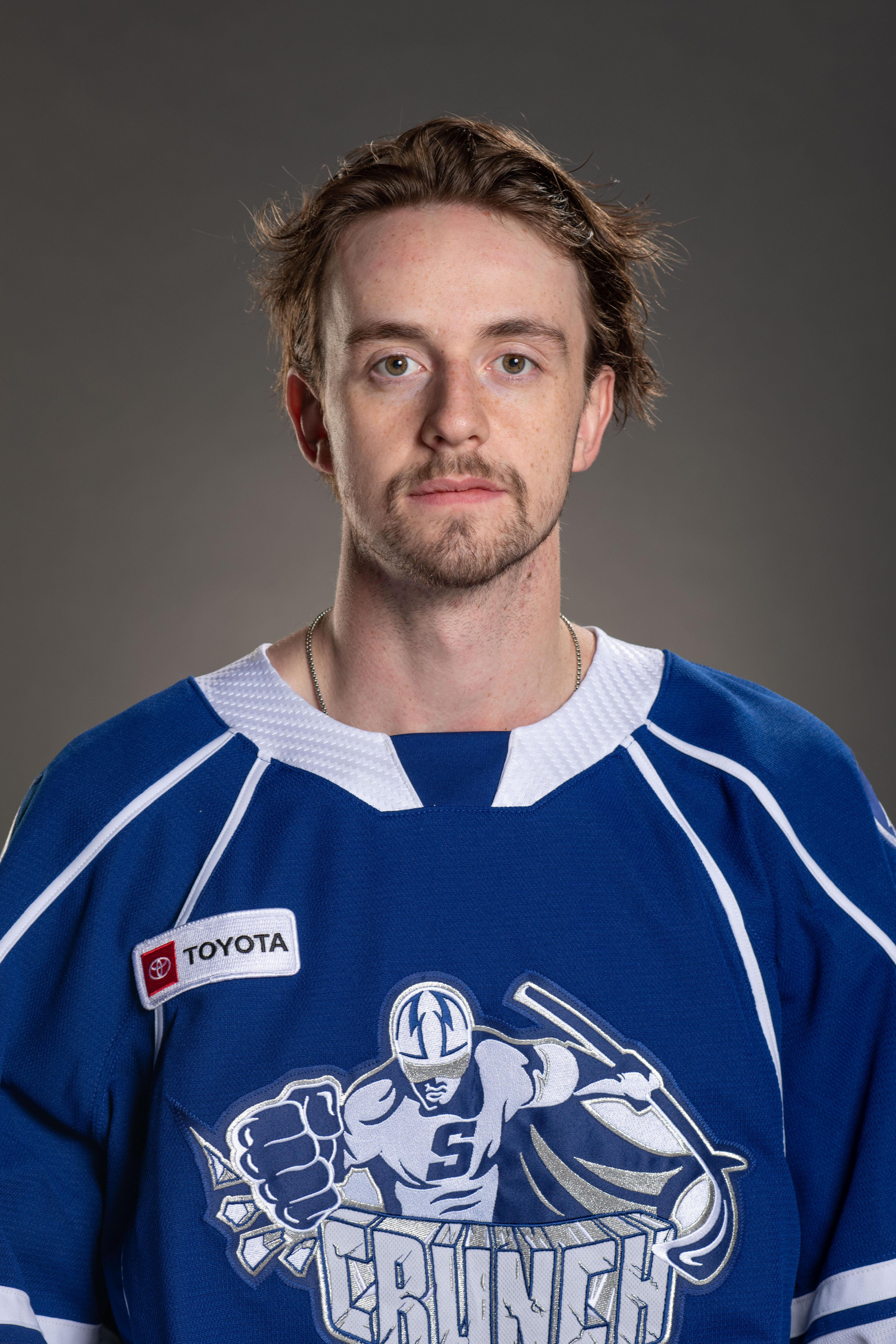
- Crozier with the Syracuse Crunch in 2023
- Born: April 19, 2000 (age 26) North Vancouver, British Columbia
- Height: 6 ft 2 in (188 cm)
- Weight: 185 lb (84 kg; 13 st 3 lb)
- Position: Defence
- Shoots: Right
- NHL team: Tampa Bay Lightning
- NHL draft: 120th overall, 2019; Tampa Bay Lightning
- Playing career: 2023–present

Maxwell Crozier (born April 19, 2000) is a Canadian professional ice hockey player who is a defenceman for the Tampa Bay Lightning of the National Hockey League (NHL).

== Playing career ==
On May 17, 2019, Crozier helped the Sioux Falls Stampede capture the Clark Cup as USHL champions. Crozier was named to the All-USHL Third team at the end of the season. Crozier was also committed to join Providence College in the fall.

On June 22, 2019, the Tampa Bay Lightning selected Crozier 120th overall in the 2019 NHL entry draft.

On January 19, 2023, Crozier was named a nominee for the 2023 Hobey Baker Award. Going into the nomination Crozier was tied for second on the team in scoring (19 points) and lead the team in assists (17). His assist total ranked 3rd overall amongst Hockey East players.

On March 21, 2023, Crozier signed a two-year entry-level contract with the Tampa Bay Lightning after completing his senior season with Providence College. Crozier recorded 17 goals and 54 assists over 119 games in his career with the Friars.

During the 2023–24 season, on January 13, 2024, Crozier made his NHL debut with the Tampa Bay Lightning. Crozier helped the Lightning defeat the Anaheim Ducks 5–1 at Amalie Arena.

== Career statistics ==
			Regular season					Playoffs
Season	Team	League	GP	G	A	Pts	PIM	GP	G	A	Pts	PIM
2017–18	Nanaimo Clippers	BCHL	49	6	23	29	67	6	0	2	2	6
2018–19	Sioux Falls Stampede	USHL	60	10	33	43	132	12	4	7	11	10
2019–20	Providence College	HE	33	4	12	16	24	—	—	—	—	—
2020–21	Providence College	HE	17	3	5	8	10	—	—	—	—	—
2021–22	Providence College	HE	32	7	16	23	16	—	—	—	—	—
2022–23	Providence College	HE	37	3	21	24	33	—	—	—	—	—
2022–23	Syracuse Crunch	AHL	9	0	3	3	6	5	0	0	0	2
2023–24	Syracuse Crunch	AHL	49	4	17	21	43	6	0	4	4	4
2023–24	Tampa Bay Lightning	NHL	13	0	2	2	7	3	0	0	0	2
2024–25	Syracuse Crunch	AHL	52	9	25	34	75	3	0	0	0	2
2024–25	Tampa Bay Lightning	NHL	5	0	0	0	0	—	—	—	—	—
2025–26	Tampa Bay Lightning	NHL	35	1	9	10	40	2	0	0	0	2
NHL totals			53	1	11	12	47	5	0	0	0	4
