= Joseph Lafontaine =

Joseph Lafontaine is the name of:

- Joseph Lafontaine (Shefford MLA) (1839–1904), notary, mayor and politician in Quebec
- Joseph Lafontaine (Berthier MLA) (1865–1920), farmer, mayor and politician in Quebec
- Joseph Lafontaine (Quebec MP) (1885–1965), merchant and member of the Canadian House of Commons from Quebec
