= Nick Abruzzese =

American ice hockey player (born 1999)

- Born: June 4, 1999 (age 27) Slate Hill, New York, U.S.
- Height: 5 ft 11 in (180 cm)
- Weight: 180 lb (82 kg; 12 st 12 lb)
- Position: Center
- Shoots: Left
- NHL team (P) Cur. team Former teams: Tampa Bay Lightning; Syracuse Crunch (AHL); Toronto Maple Leafs
- National team: United States
- NHL draft: 124th overall, 2019; Toronto Maple Leafs
- Playing career: 2022–present

Nicholas Abruzzese (born June 4, 1999) is an American professional ice hockey player who is a center for the Syracuse Crunch in the American Hockey League (AHL) while under contract to the Tampa Bay Lightning of the National Hockey League (NHL).

Growing up in New York, Abruzzese played for numerous junior hockey teams before joining the Chicago Steel in the United States Hockey League (USHL) from 2017 to 2019. During his time with the Steel, Abruzzese thrived under new coach Greg Moore and led the league in scoring with 80 points in 69 games. As such, he was named to the 2018–19 All-USHL First Team and was drafted by the Toronto Maple Leafs in the 2019 NHL entry draft.

Following the draft, Abruzzese joined the Harvard Crimson men's ice hockey team from 2020 to 2022 while majoring in psychology. His freshman season was the best under coach Ted Donato as Abruzzese accumulated 14 goals and 30 assists for 44 points through 31 games. As a result of his play, Abruzzese was named the ECAC Hockey Rookie of the Year and Ivy League Rookie of the Year. He was also selected for ECAC First All-Star Team, First Team All-Ivy, and All-Rookie Team. In March 2020, Abruzzese was also selected for the AHCA Second Team All-American. After being drafted, he played a number of years in the Maple Leafs organization before signing with Tampa Bay in 2025.

== Early life ==
Abruzzese was born on June 4, 1999, in Slate Hill, New York. His father played hockey in New York growing up and got his son interested in the sport. Beyond ice hockey, Abruzzese also played baseball, lacrosse, and soccer. Abruzzese graduated from Minisink Valley High School in 2017.

== Playing career ==
=== Amateur ===
Growing up in New York, Abruzzese played with 13U AAA New Jersey Colonials, the 16U AAA New Jersey Avalanche, 16U Westchester Express teams, and the 18U AAA New Jersey Avalanche. He also played with the Mid-Fairfield Yankees in 2014 and scored one goal and three assists to help the team qualify for the Toyota-USA Hockey Tier I Youth National Championships. During the 2015–16 season, Abruzzese tallied 35 points in 24 Atlantic Youth Hockey League games and 17 goals and 30 points in 32 Tier 1 Elite Hockey League games. Following this, Abruzzese joined the North American Hockey League's New Jersey Junior Titans for the 2016–17 season. During this time, he attended Minisink Valley and committed to play Division 1 ice hockey for the University of Vermont.

Following his commitment to the University of Vermont, Abruzzese played junior hockey with the Chicago Steel in the United States Hockey League (USHL) from 2017 to 2019. In his rookie season with the Steel, Abruzzese posted 13 goals and 36 points through 56 games but remained undrafted in the National Hockey League (NHL). During his second USHL season, Abruzzese changed his collegiate commitment and decided to join the Harvard Crimson men's ice hockey team for the 2019–20 season. He improved offensively during the 2018–19 season under new coach Greg Moore and led the league in scoring with 80 points in 69 games. As a result of his impressive season, Abruzzese was named to the All-USHL First Team. He was also selected 124th overall by the Toronto Maple Leafs in the 2019 NHL entry draft.

=== Collegiate ===
Following the NHL entry draft, Abruzzese began his collegiate career with the Harvard Crimson in the ECAC Hockey Conference while majoring in psychology. He recorded his first collegiate goal and added two assists on November 1, 2019, in a 7–3 win over Dartmouth. By December, he had accumulated 16 points through 14 games to lead all NCAA first-years in scoring per game with 1.14 points per contest. As such, he was recognized by the Eastern College Athletic Conference (ECAC) with their ECAC Hockey Rookie of the Month Award for December. Later in January, Abruzzese notched his first multiple-goal game and was named a nominee for the Hobey Baker Award as the top National Collegiate Athletic Association (NCAA) men's ice hockey player. He finished the month of February tied amongst skaters and leading all freshmen with 12 points. Abruzzese also led the league in points per game with 1.34, accumulating 39 points overall. As such, he received his third ECAC Hockey Rookie of the Month honor.

After his freshman season, Abruzzese had accumulated 14 goals and 30 assists for 44 points through 31 games which was the best freshman season under coach Ted Donato. As a result of his overall play, Abruzzese was named the ECAC Hockey Rookie of the Year and Ivy League Rookie of the Year and was selected for ECAC First All-Star Team, First Team All-Ivy, and All-Rookie Team. In March 2020, Abruzzese was also selected for the AHCA Second Team All-American. However, following his successful freshman season, Harvard — along with the rest of the ECAC's Ivy League schools and Union — did not play during the 2020-21 NCAA season because of the COVID-19 pandemic. As such, Abruzzese returned home to New York to complete online classes and underwent hip surgery at the Hospital for Special Surgery.

Once collegiate hockey resumed for the 2021–22 season, Abruzzese returned to Harvard as their team co-captain alongside Casey Dornbach. In this role, he contributed 33 points through 28 games. Before leaving for the 2022 Winter Olympics, Abruzzese was one of Harvard's top point producers with 21 points through 17 games. He also ranked tenth in the country with an average of 1.24 points per game. After returning from the Olympics, Abruzzese helped guide the team to the NCAA regional semifinal by scoring the game-tying goal in an eventual win over the Clarkson Golden Knights men's ice hockey team in the ECAC Semi-Finals. Upon reaching the NCAA Albany Regional semifinals against Minnesota State, the Crimson fell 4–3 and were subsequently eliminated. Following the elimination, Abruzzese was named to the 2021–22 NCAA ECAC First All-Star Team.

=== Professional ===
Abruzzese ended his collegiate career by signing a two-year, entry-level contract with the Toronto Maple Leafs on March 26, 2022. He made his NHL debut on April 4, 2022, in a game against the Philadelphia Flyers where he skated for nine minutes through 15 shifts. Abruzzese scored his first career NHL goal, a game winner, against the Boston Bruins on April 29, 2022.

On July 21, 2023, Abruzzese signed a two-year, $1,550,000 contract extension with the Toronto Maple Leafs as a restricted free agent. Over the next two seasons, Abruzzese would play entirely with the Toronto Marlies, the Leafs' American Hockey League (AHL) affiliate. Upon expiration of the contract, he was not tendered a qualifying offer by the Maple Leafs to retain his rights and subsequently released to unrestricted free agency, where he signed a one-year, two-way contract with the Tampa Bay Lightning on July 1, 2025.

== International play ==
During his junior year at Harvard, Abruzzese and teammate Sean Farrell were named to Team USA's men's national ice hockey team for the 2022 Winter Olympics. He scored the game-tying goal in an eventual 3–2 loss to Slovakia that eliminated Team USA from the tournament. Abruzzese ended the tournament with one goal and three assists for four points through four games.

== Career statistics ==
=== Regular season and playoffs ===
			Regular season					Playoffs
Season	Team	League	GP	G	A	Pts	PIM	GP	G	A	Pts	PIM
2016–17	New Jersey Junior Titans	NAHL	4	1	0	1	0	—	—	—	—	—
2017–18	Chicago Steel	USHL	56	13	23	36	12	7	1	3	4	2
2018–19	Chicago Steel	USHL	62	29	51	80	20	11	7	7	14	0
2019–20	Harvard University	ECAC	31	14	30	44	4	—	—	—	—	—
2021–22	Harvard University	ECAC	28	9	24	33	8	—	—	—	—	—
2021–22	Toronto Maple Leafs	NHL	9	1	0	1	2	—	—	—	—	—
2022–23	Toronto Marlies	AHL	69	16	32	48	18	7	2	5	7	0
2022–23	Toronto Maple Leafs	NHL	2	0	2	2	0	—	—	—	—	—
2023–24	Toronto Marlies	AHL	71	16	36	52	24	3	0	0	0	0
2024–25	Toronto Marlies	AHL	71	15	28	43	10	2	0	1	1	0
2025–26	Syracuse Crunch	AHL	56	15	36	51	11	4	1	3	4	0
NHL totals			11	1	2	3	2	—	—	—	—	—

=== International ===
Year	Team	Event	Result	GP	G	A	Pts	PIM
2022	United States	OG	5th	4	1	3	4	0
Senior totals				4	1	3	4	0

== Awards and honors ==
Award	Year	Ref
USHL
All-USHL First Team	2018–19	
College
AHCA Second Team All-American	2019–20	
ECAC All-Rookie Team	2019–20	
ECAC Rookie of the Year	2019–20	
Ivy League Rookie of the Year	2019-20	
ECAC First All-Star Team	2019–20	
ECAC First All-Star Team	2021–22	
AHCA East First Team All-American	2021–22	
