= Lafontaine baronets =

Extinct baronetcy in the Baronetage of the United Kingdom

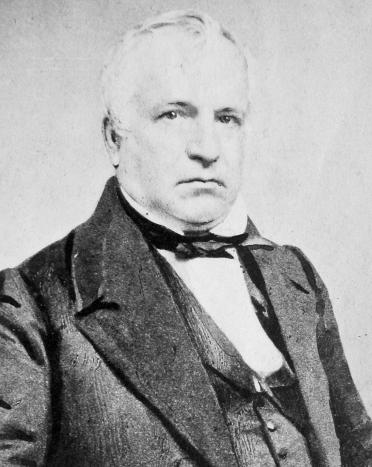
Sir Louis-Hippolyte Lafontaine, 1st Baronet

The Lafontaine (or La Fontaine) Baronetcy, of the City of Montreal in the County of Montreal, was a title in the Baronetage of the United Kingdom. It was created on 28 August 1854 for the Canadian statesman Louis-Hippolyte Lafontaine. The title became extinct on the early death of his son, the second Baronet, in 1867.

== Lafontaine (or La Fontaine) baronets, of the City of Montreal (1854) ==
- Sir Louis-Hippolyte Lafontaine, 1st Baronet (1807–1864)
- Sir Louis-Hippolyte La Fontaine, 2nd Baronet (1862–1867)

== Arms ==
Coat of arms of Lafontaine baronets
Crest Upon a Rock, a Stone Fountain proper. Escutcheon Azure, on a Fess Argent, an open Book surmounting a Sword bendwise proper, between two Maple Leaves Vert, in chief a Cubit-Arm fesswise proper, vested, cuffed and holding a Pair of Scales Argent, and in base on a Mount Vert, a Beaver proper. Motto FONS ET ORIGO (Source and origin)

== See also ==
- Lafontaine (surname)
