= Josiah Slavin =

American ice hockey player (born 1998)

- Born: December 31, 1998 (age 27) Erie, Colorado, U.S.
- Height: 6 ft 3 in (191 cm)
- Weight: 205 lb (93 kg; 14 st 9 lb)
- Position: Winger
- Shoots: Left
- AHL team Former teams: Chicago Wolves; Chicago Blackhawks; Carolina Hurricanes
- NHL draft: 193rd overall, 2018; Chicago Blackhawks
- Playing career: 2021–present

Josiah Slavin (born December 31, 1998) is an American professional ice hockey player who is a winger for and captain of the Chicago Wolves of the American Hockey League (AHL). He was selected by the Chicago Blackhawks in the seventh round, 193rd overall, of the 2018 NHL entry draft.

== Playing career ==
Slavin played college hockey for Colorado College in the National Collegiate Hockey Conference and was drafted by the Chicago Blackhawks of the National Hockey League (NHL) in the seventh round of the 2018 NHL entry draft. He signed a two year entry-level contract with the Blackhawks on March 16, 2021. He was assigned immediately to Chicago's American Hockey League (AHL) affiliate, the Rockford Ice Hogs. The following season, Slavin was recalled from Rockford in November to join the Blackhawks. He made his NHL debut on December 2, 2021, in a 4–3 overtime win over the Washington Capitals, in which he recorded his first NHL point, an assist on a goal by Seth Jones. During the final year of his entry-level contract in the 2022–23 season, Slavin contributed with just 3 goals in 51 regular season with the IceHogs before he was traded by the Blackhawks to the Anaheim Ducks in exchange for Hunter Drew on February 23, 2022. He finished the season with Anaheim's AHL affiliate, the San Diego Gulls, where he recorded four goals and seven points in 16 games.

As an unrestricted free agent from the Ducks after he was not tendered a qualifying offer, Slavin was signed to a one-year AHL contract with the Toronto Marlies on July 9, 2023. In the 2023–24 season, Slavin was a mainstay amongst the Marlies forwards and contributed with 10 goals and 14 assists for 24 points through 70 regular season games. He featured in three playoff games with Toronto, going scoreless.

As a free agent, Slavin secured an NHL contract after agreeing to a two-year, two-way contract with the Carolina Hurricanes on July 7, 2024. After going unclaimed on waivers, Slavin was assigned to the Hurricanes' AHL affiliate, the Chicago Wolves, for the 2024–25 season.

On July 1, 2026, Slavin's contract with the Hurricanes expired, leaving him as an unrestricted free agent, however on August 17, 2026, Slavin was signed to a two-year contract by the Wolves, to keep him in the organization.

== Personal life ==
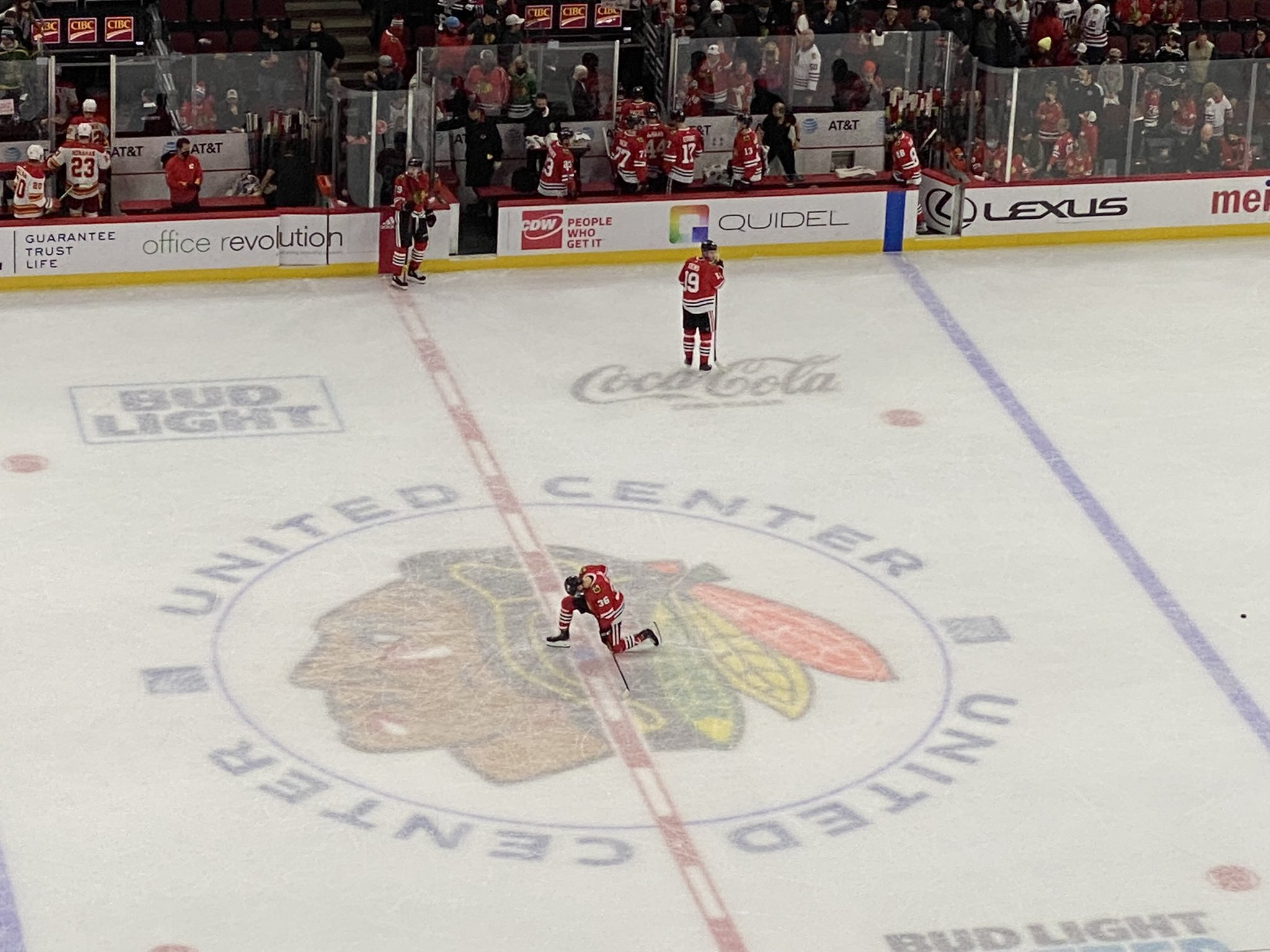
Slavin kneeling in prayer before a Blackhawks game

Slavin is the younger brother of Jaccob Slavin who plays for the Carolina Hurricanes. Slavin is a devout Christian. He frequently cites his faith as part of how he approaches games. After every game he plays, Slavin kneels at center ice and prays.

== Career statistics ==
			Regular season					Playoffs
Season	Team	League	GP	G	A	Pts	PIM	GP	G	A	Pts	PIM
2014–15	Colorado Thunderbirds 16U AAA	T1EHL	24	12	6	18	6	4	0	1	1	0
2015–16	Colorado Thunderbirds 18U AAA	T1EHL	32	13	10	23	24	4	0	1	1	10
2016–17	Tri-City Storm	USHL	49	6	8	14	24	—	—	—	—	—
2017–18	Lincoln Stars	USHL	60	23	19	42	30	7	2	1	3	0
2018–19	Lincoln Stars	USHL	32	10	17	27	34	—	—	—	—	—
2018–19	Chicago Steel	USHL	27	14	6	20	10	11	4	4	8	6
2019–20	Colorado College	NCHC	34	5	8	13	43	—	—	—	—	—
2020–21	Colorado College	NCHC	22	5	8	13	4	—	—	—	—	—
2020–21	Rockford IceHogs	AHL	15	3	4	7	8	—	—	—	—	—
2021–22	Rockford IceHogs	AHL	49	18	14	32	17	5	0	1	1	4
2021–22	Chicago Blackhawks	NHL	15	0	1	1	4	—	—	—	—	—
2022–23	Rockford IceHogs	AHL	51	3	8	11	16	—	—	—	—	—
2022–23	San Diego Gulls	AHL	16	4	3	7	4	—	—	—	—	—
2023–24	Toronto Marlies	AHL	70	10	14	24	45	3	0	0	0	0
2024–25	Chicago Wolves	AHL	66	12	9	21	26	2	0	0	0	2
2025–26	Chicago Wolves	AHL	69	6	19	25	26	21	3	4	7	8
2025–26	Carolina Hurricanes	NHL	2	0	0	0	2	—	—	—	—	—
NHL totals			17	0	1	1	6	—	—	—	—	—
