= Matias Maccelli =

Finnish ice hockey player (born 2000)

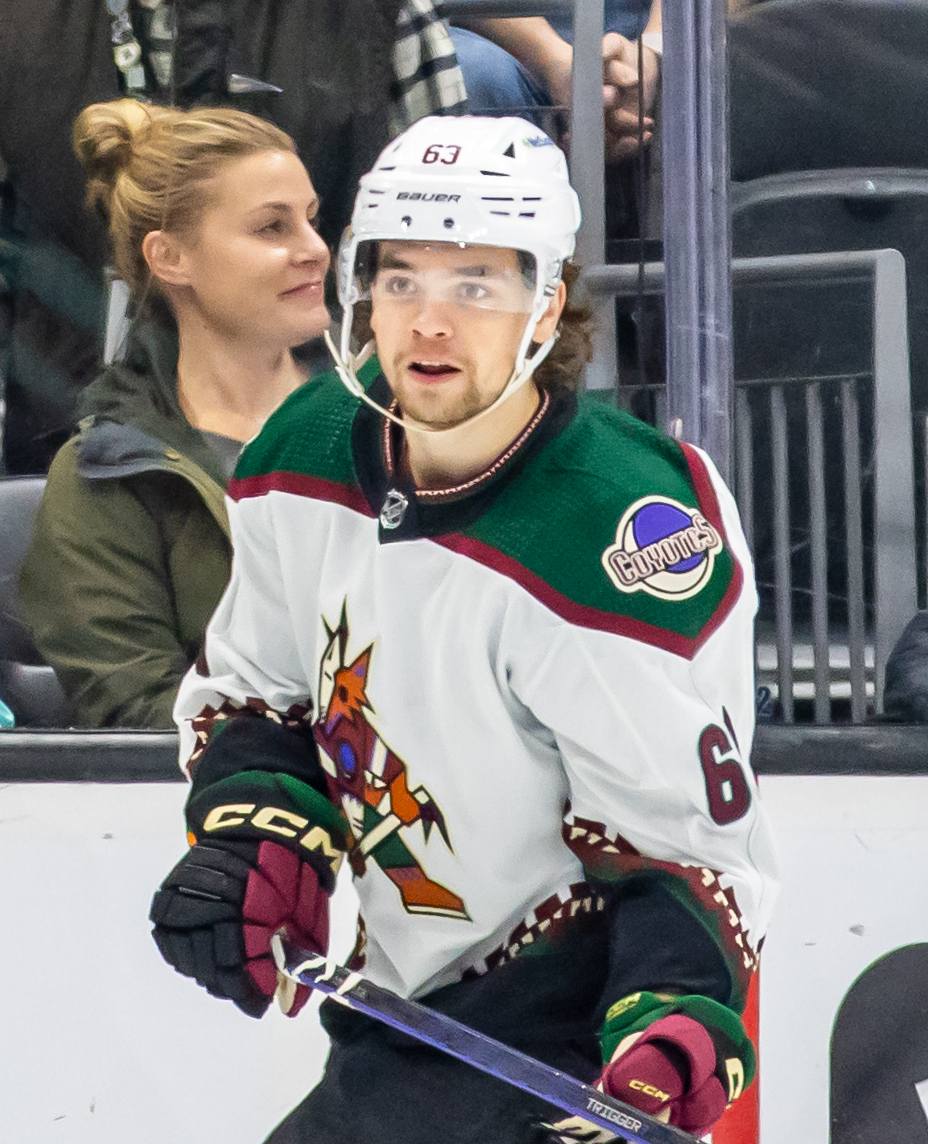
- Maccelli with the Arizona Coyotes in 2023
- Born: October 14, 2000 (age 25) Turku, Finland
- Height: 5 ft 11 in (180 cm)
- Weight: 165 lb (75 kg; 11 st 11 lb)
- Position: Winger
- Shoots: Left
- NHL team Former teams: New York Islanders; Ilves; Arizona Coyotes; Utah Hockey Club; Toronto Maple Leafs
- NHL draft: 98th overall, 2019; Arizona Coyotes
- Playing career: 2019–present

Matias Maccelli (born October 14, 2000) is a Finnish professional ice hockey player who is a winger for the New York Islanders of the National Hockey League (NHL). Maccelli was drafted in the fourth round, 98th overall, by the Arizona Coyotes in the 2019 NHL entry draft, and has also played for the Utah Hockey Club.

== Early life ==
Maccelli was born to an American-born mother and Finnish father in Turku, Finland. His mother had moved to Finland when she was seven years old. Maccelli is of Italian descent through his maternal great-grandfather who was from Italy.

== Playing career ==
Maccelli began his junior career with HC TPS of the Finnish Liiga. In 2017, he joined the Dubuque Fighting Saints of the United States Hockey League (USHL). In 98 games with Dubuque, he recorded 39 goals and 54 assists for 93 points. In his second year in the USHL, his play led him to being named to the ALL-USHL Second Team. In 2019, Maccelli returned to Finland to join Ilves of Liiga.

Maccelli was selected 98th overall in the fourth round of the 2019 NHL entry draft by the Arizona Coyotes. In his first season with Ilves, in the 2019–20 season, he recorded 13 goals and 17 assists for 30 points in 42 games. Maccelli signed a three-year, entry-level contract with Arizona on April 29, 2020, while still playing for Ilves. He was named the league's rookie of the year, being awarded the Jarmo Wasama Memorial Trophy. On July 17, it was announced that Maccelli would stay with Ilves after an open-ended agreement was reached between the Finnish team and Arizona. He played well with Ilves during the 2020–21 season.

For the 2021–22 season, Maccelli returned to North America, joining Arizona's American Hockey League (AHL) affiliate, the Tucson Roadrunners. He recorded 14 goals and 43 assists for 57 points in 47 games with Tucson. He was recalled by Arizona in March 2022 to replace Andrew Ladd who had been placed on injured reserve. He made his NHL debut in a 2–1 win over the Colorado Avalanche on March 3. Maccelli scored his first NHL goal in his second game on March 6, versus the Ottawa Senators.

Maccelli broke out in the 2022–23 season, making the Coyotes' roster out of training camp. In his first 30 games, he recorded three goals and 19 assists for 22 points. He suffered a lower-body injury that led to some missed time, but upon his return, scored seven goals and 16 assist for 23 points in his next 30 games. He finished the season with 11 goals and 38 assist for 49 points in 64 games with the Coyotes and was named to the NHL's All-Rookie Team, playing a major role in the team's power play. On July 16, 2023, Maccelli signed a three-year contract with Arizona.

Shortly after the end of the 2023–24 season, the Coyotes' franchise was suspended and team assets were subsequently transferred to the expansion team Utah Hockey Club; as a result, Maccelli became a member of the Utah team.

Following the 2024–25 season, Utah traded Maccelli to the Toronto Maple Leafs on June 30, 2025, in exchange for a conditional third-round draft pick in 2027, which could have become a second-round draft back in 2029 if the Maple Leafs qualified for the 2026 Stanley Cup playoffs and Maccelli scored 51 points (neither condition met). Acquired by the Maple Leafs as a potential Mitch Marner replacement and in the hopes that he would bounce-back to his form in previous seasons with the Coyotes, Maccelli had a disappointing campaign with the Maple Leafs relative to expectations, with Macceli playing up and down the lineup throughout the year and occasionally being a healthy scratch. Despite this, he recorded 39 points with the Maple Leafs. Upon expiration of his contract, he was not tendered a qualifying offer by the team and subsequently became an unrestricted free agent.

On July 1, 2026, Maccelli signed a one-year, $2.25 million contract with the New York Islanders.

== International play ==
Maccelli played for Finland at the 2017 Ivan Hlinka Memorial Tournament. He played for the team again during the 2020 World Junior Championships, recording two goals and three assists for five points in seven games.

== Career statistics ==
=== Regular season and playoffs ===
			Regular season					Playoffs
Season	Team	League	GP	G	A	Pts	PIM	GP	G	A	Pts	PIM
2016–17	TPS	Jr. A	13	4	3	7	2	3	0	0	0	0
2017–18	TPS	Jr. A	34	15	15	30	8	—	—	—	—	—
2017–18	Dubuque Fighting Saints	USHL	36	8	13	21	14	5	0	1	1	0
2018–19	Dubuque Fighting Saints	USHL	62	31	41	72	42	6	1	4	5	2
2019–20	Ilves	Liiga	43	13	17	30	16	—	—	—	—	—
2020–21	Ilves	Liiga	51	15	24	39	20	5	1	1	2	2
2021–22	Tucson Roadrunners	AHL	47	14	43	57	20	—	—	—	—	—
2021–22	Arizona Coyotes	NHL	23	1	5	6	4	—	—	—	—	—
2022–23	Arizona Coyotes	NHL	64	11	38	49	18	—	—	—	—	—
2023–24	Arizona Coyotes	NHL	82	17	40	57	8	—	—	—	—	—
2024–25	Utah Hockey Club	NHL	55	8	10	18	8	—	—	—	—	—
2025–26	Toronto Maple Leafs	NHL	70	14	25	39	16	—	—	—	—	—
Liiga totals			94	28	41	69	36	5	1	1	2	2
NHL totals			295	51	118	169	54	—	—	—	—	—

=== International ===
Year	Team	Event	Result	GP	G	A	Pts	PIM
2017	Finland	IH18	6th	4	1	1	2	0
2020	Finland	WJC	4th	7	2	3	5	8
Junior totals				11	3	4	7	8

== Awards and honours ==
Award	Year	Ref
USHL
Second All-Star Team	2019	
Liiga
Jarmo Wasama Memorial Trophy	2020	
NHL
NHL All-Rookie Team	2023	
