= Fountaine =

Fountaine is a surname. Notable people with the surname include:

- Andrew Fountaine (1918–1997), English far-right activist and politician
- Andrew Fountaine (art collector) (1676–1753), English antiquarian, art collector and amateur architect
- Charles Fountaine (1879–1946), British Royal Navy officer
- Jamal Fountaine (born 1971), American football player
- John Fountaine (1600–1671), English civil servant and tax resister
- Margaret Fountaine (1862–1940), English lepidopterist

== See also ==
- Fountain (disambiguation)
- Fountaine-Pajot, a French shipbuilding company
- Fontaine (disambiguation)
- Fontaineece, a surname
