= 2018–19 USHL season =

2018–19 USHL Season
- League: United States Hockey League
- Sport: Ice hockey
- Duration: September 27, 2018 – April 13, 2019
- Games: 62
- Teams: 17

Draft
- Top draft pick: Trevor Janicke
- Picked by: Central Illinois Flying Aces

Regular season
- Anderson Cup: Tri-City Storm
- Season MVP: Ronnie Attard (Tri-City Storm)
- Top scorer: Nick Abruzzese (Chicago Steel)

Clark Cup Playoffs
- Clark Cup Playoffs MVP: Jaxson Stauber (Stampede)
- Finals champions: Sioux Falls Stampede
- Runners-up: Chicago Steel

USHL seasons
- 2017–18 2019–20

The 2018–19 USHL season was the 40th season of the United States Hockey League as an all-junior league. The regular season ran from September 27, 2018, to April 13, 2019. The Tri-City Storm were awarded the Anderson Cup as regular season champions for accumulating 95 points over 62 games. The season concluded with the Sioux Falls Stampede defeating the Chicago Steel in the Clark Cup Final series 3–0 on May 17, 2019.

== League changes ==
After serving as the interim commissioner since November 2017, Tom Garrity was named the ninth commissioner in league history. He replaced Bob Fallen who had served as commissioner since 2014. On April 5, 2018, the league announced the annual Fall Classic in partnership with the National Hockey League would count towards the regular season standings, with all member clubs playing two games between September 27 and 30 at the UPMC Lemieux Sports Complex in Pittsburgh.

== Regular season ==
Final standings:

=== Eastern Conference ===
Team	GP	W	L	OTL	SOL	PTS	GF	GA
y – Muskegon Lumberjacks	62	41	17	3	1	86	228	173
x – Chicago Steel	62	37	21	4	0	78	243	207
x – Youngstown Phantoms	62	36	21	1	4	77	214	209
x – Cedar Rapids RoughRiders	62	36	21	3	2	77	188	161
x – Team USA	62	30	24	2	6	68	269	227
x – Dubuque Fighting Saints	62	28	26	4	4	64	192	204
Central Illinois Flying Aces	62	24	33	3	2	53	183	225
Green Bay Gamblers	62	19	34	6	3	47	173	250
Madison Capitols	62	15	38	5	4	39	145	249

=== Western Conference ===
Team	GP	W	L	OTL	SOL	PTS	GF	GA
z – Tri-City Storm	62	45	12	3	2	95	232	144
x – Waterloo Black Hawks	62	39	16	5	2	85	232	173
x – Sioux Falls Stampede	62	39	16	5	2	85	234	190
x – Des Moines Buccaneers	62	35	22	1	4	75	202	177
x – Fargo Force	62	34	23	3	2	73	188	172
x – Sioux City Musketeers	62	30	25	5	2	67	187	197
Omaha Lancers	62	27	27	4	4	62	155	197
Lincoln Stars	62	12	42	4	4	32	151	262

x = clinched playoff berth; y = clinched conference title; z = clinched regular season title

== Statistical leaders ==
=== Scoring leaders ===
Players are listed by points, then goals.

Note: GP = Games played; G = Goals; A = Assists; Pts. = Points; PIM = Penalty minutes

Player	Team	GP	G	A	Pts	PIM
Nick Abruzzese	Chicago Steel	62	29	51	80	20
Brett Murray	Youngstown Phantoms	62	41	35	76	35
Matias Maccelli	Dubuque Fighting Saints	54	31	41	72	42
Bobby Brink	Sioux City Musketeers	43	35	33	68	22
Ben Meyers	Fargo Force	59	33	32	65	26
Ronnie Attard	Tri-City Storm	48	30	35	65	66
Hank Crone	Fargo Force	60	19	46	65	66
Emil Öhrvall	Waterloo Black Hawks	59	31	32	63	52
Martin Pospíšil	Sioux City Musketeers	44	16	47	63	118
Egor Afanasyev	Muskegon Lumberjacks	58	27	35	62	36

=== Leading goaltenders ===
These are the goaltenders that lead the league in GAA that have played at least 1380 minutes.

Note: GP = Games played; Mins = Minutes played; W = Wins; L = Losses; OTL = Overtime losses; SOL = Shootout losses; SO = Shutouts; GAA = Goals against average; SV% = Save percentage

Player	Team	GP	Mins	W	L	OTL	SOL	SO	GAA	SV%
Isaiah Saville	Tri-City Storm	34	1992	25	4	2	1	4	1.90	0.925
Akira Schmid	Omaha Lancers	37	2012	16	14	2	0	2	2.18	0.926
Blake Pietila	Cedar Rapids RoughRiders	47	2794	30	13	3	1	5	2.30	0.912
Brandon Bussi	Muskegon Lumberjacks	52	2824	33	12	3	1	7	2.44	0.915
Ryan Bischel	Fargo Force	55	3205	28	20	3	2	2	2.55	0.905

== Clark Cup playoffs ==
First Round (Best-of-3)	Conference Semifinals (Best-of-5)
E1	Muskegon	3
E6	Dubuque	1
E3	Youngstown	0
E6	Dubuque	2
Eastern Conference
E4	Cedar Rapids	2
E5	Team USA	0
E2	Chicago	3
E4	Cedar Rapids	1
W1	Tri-City	3
W4	Des Moines	0
W3	Sioux Falls	2
W6	Sioux City	0
Western Conference
W4	Des Moines	2
W5	Fargo	0
W2	Waterloo	1
W3	Sioux Falls	3

Conference Finals (Best-of-5)
E1	Muskegon	1
E2	Chicago	3
W1	Tri-City	0
W3	Sioux Falls	3

Clark Cup Championship (Best-of-5)
E2	Chicago	0
W3	Sioux Falls	3

== First Round ==
=== Eastern Conference ===
==== (E3) Youngstown Phantoms vs. (E6) Dubuque Fighting Saints ====
April 15	Youngstown Phantoms	1 – 3	Dubuque Fighting Saints	Covelli Centre
No scoring		First period	No scoring
10:21 - Brett Murray (1)		Second period	No scoring
No scoring		Third period	Bram Scheerer (1) - 1:58; Dylan Jackson (1) - 11:32; Derek Contessa (1) - en - 19:29
Chad Veltri (27 saves / 29 shots)		Goalie stats	Matthew Thiessen (16 saves / 17 shots)

April 16	Youngstown Phantoms	2 – 3	OT	Dubuque Fighting Saints	Covelli Centre
8:18 - Liam Robertson (1)		First period		No scoring
No scoring		Second period		No scoring
2:59 - Josh De Luca (1)		Third period		Dallas Tulik (1) - 0:20; Logan Pietila (1) - pp - 14:46
No scoring		First overtime period		Willie Knierim (1) - 4:47
Chad Veltri (22 saves / 25 shots)		Goalie stats		Matthew Thiessen (30 saves / 32 shots)

Dubuque wins series 2 – 0

==== (E4) Cedar Rapids RoughRiders vs. (E5) Team USA ====
April 15	Cedar Rapids RoughRiders	6 – 3	Team USA	Cedar Rapids Ice Arena
6:56 - pp - Jason Polin (1); 7:16 - Jason Polin (2)		First period	No scoring
1:48 - Jason Polin (3); 13:51 - pp - Max Sasson (1); 17:20 - pp - Aidan McDonough (1)		Second period	No scoring
19:26 - en - Liam Walsh (1)		Third period	Thomas Bordeleau (1) - pp - 1:59; Daniyal Dzhaniyev (1) - 4:40; Ryder Rolston (1) - pp - 7:47
Blake Pietila (26 saves / 29 shots)		Goalie stats	Drew Commesso (7 saves / 10 shots); Noah Grannan (5 saves / 7 shots)

April 16	Cedar Rapids RoughRiders	7 – 2	Team USA	Cedar Rapids Ice Arena
10:03 - Grant Silianoff (1); 19:58 - Jerry Harding (1)		First period	No scoring
1:02 - Jason Polin (4); 8:07 - Jordan Tonelli (1); 9:57 - pp - Jason Polin (5); 12:27 - pp - Grant Silianoff (2)		Second period	Jacob Truscott (1) - pp - 8:49; Eamon Powell (1) - pp - 14:57
12:17 - en - Joe Hankinson (1)		Third period	No scoring
Blake Pietila (13 saves / 15 shots)		Goalie stats	Drew Commesso (12 saves / 16 shots); Noah Grannan (15 saves / 17 shots)

Cedar Rapids wins series 2 – 0

=== Western Conference ===
==== (W3) Sioux Falls Stampede vs. (W6) Sioux City Musketeers ====
April 16	Sioux Falls Stampede	2 – 1	Sioux City Musketeers	Denny Sanford Premier Center
15:40 - Jared Westcott (1)		First period	No scoring
No scoring		Second period	Blake Biondi (1) - 8:03
13:01 - pp - Andre Lee (1)		Third period	No scoring
Jaxson Stauber (12 saves / 13 shots)		Goalie stats	Ben Kraws (24 saves / 26 shots)

April 17	Sioux Falls Stampede	3 – 2	4OT	Sioux City Musketeers	Denny Sanford Premier Center
11:03 - Ethan Phillips (1)		First period		Blake Biondi (2) - 15:08
No scoring		Second period		Albin Nilsson (1) - 2:20
4:10 - pp - Andre Lee (2)		Third period		No scoring
2:57 - Austen Swankler (1)		Fourth overtime period		No scoring
Jaxson Stauber (39 saves / 41 shots)		Goalie stats		Ben Kraws (49 saves / 52 shots)

Sioux Falls wins series 2 – 0

==== (W4) Des Moines Buccaneers vs. (W5) Fargo Force ====
April 15	Des Moines Buccaneers	7 – 3	Fargo Force	Buccaneer Arena
3:07 - Rylee St. Onge (1)		First period	No scoring
2:32 - Luke Manning (1); 6:42 - pp - Sam Renlund (1); 14:39 - Matt Brown (1); 18:42 - Jonny Russell (1)		Second period	Ben Meyers (1) - 19:20
0:52 - Nicklas Andrews (1); 17:39 - en - Jonny Russell (2)		Third period	Justin Lee (1) - 5:59; Ondřej Pavel (1) - 15:39
Roman Durný (22 saves / 25 shots)		Goalie stats	Ryan Bischel (14 saves / 17 shots); Tyler Johnson (12 saves / 15 shots)

April 16	Des Moines Buccaneers	3 – 2	OT	Fargo Force	Buccaneer Arena
No scoring		First period		Ondřej Pavel (2) - sh - 14:27
3:37 - sh - Matt Brown (2)		Second period		Kaden Bohlsen (1) - sh - 11:32
4:44 - Matt Brown (3)		Third period		No scoring
15:37 - Michael Mancinelli (1)		First overtime period		No scoring
Roman Durný (28 saves / 30 shots)		Goalie stats		Ryan Bischel (25 saves / 28 shots)

Des Moines wins series 2 – 0

== Conference Semifinals ==
=== Eastern Conference ===
==== (E1) Muskegon Lumberjacks vs. (E6) Dubuque Fighting Saints ====
April 20	Muskegon Lumberjacks	4 – 0	Dubuque Fighting Saints	L.C. Walker Arena
6:38 - pp - Nolan Sullivan (1)		First period	No scoring
No scoring		Second period	No scoring
1:41 - pp - Max Ellis (1); 10:22 - Mikael Hakkarainen (1); 12:08 - Jack Williams (1)		Third period	No scoring
Brandon Bussi (19 saves / 19 shots)		Goalie stats	Matthew Thiessen (34 saves / 38 shots)

April 21	Muskegon Lumberjacks	5 – 1	Dubuque Fighting Saints	L.C. Walker Arena
2:10 - Egor Afanasyev (1); 4:33 - Bobby Lynch (1); 8:08 - Colby Bukes (1)		First period	Jacob Semik (1) - pp - 3:04
0:59 - Colby Bukes (2)		Second period	No scoring
16:20 - pp - Jagger Joshua (1)		Third period	No scoring
Brandon Bussi (21 saves / 22 shots)		Goalie stats	Matthew Thiessen (38 saves / 43 shots)

April 23	Dubuque Fighting Saints	5 – 1	Muskegon Lumberjacks	Mystique Ice Center
2:53 - J.D. Greenway (1); 6:41 - Dylan Jackson (2); 10:50 - pp - J.D. Greenway (2); 18:34 - Bram Scheerer (2)		First period	No scoring
10:02 - Ty Jackson (1)		Second period	No scoring
No scoring		Third period	Cam McDonald (1) - 2:17
Matthew Thiessen (43 saves / 44 shots)		Goalie stats	Brandon Bussi (19 saves / 23 shots); Ryan McInchak (2 saves / 3 shots)

April 24	Dubuque Fighting Saints	1 – 2	Muskegon Lumberjacks	Mystique Ice Center
No scoring		First period	Jagger Joshua (2) - pp - 10:09
8:46 - Matias Maccelli (1)		Second period	Ryan Savage (1) - 6:16
No scoring		Third period	No scoring
Matthew Thiessen (25 saves / 27 shots)		Goalie stats	Brandon Bussi (20 saves / 21 shots)

Muskegon wins series 3 – 1

==== (E2) Chicago Steel vs. (E4) Cedar Rapids RoughRiders ====
April 20	Chicago Steel	6 – 3	Cedar Rapids RoughRiders	Fox Valley Ice Arena
5:37 - Matteo Pietroniro (1)		First period	Jerry Harding (2) - 11:19
7:06 - John Spetz (1); 10:19 - Christian Sarlo (1); 10:56 - Nick Abruzzese (1)		Second period	Jerry Harding (3) - sh - 4:46; Max Sasson (2) - pp - 19:24
0:31 - Neil Shea (1); 11:11 - Nick Abruzzese (2)		Third period	No scoring
Justin Robbins (23 saves / 26 shots)		Goalie stats	Blake Pietila (22 saves / 28 shots)

April 21	Chicago Steel	3 – 4	OT	Cedar Rapids RoughRiders	Fox Valley Ice Arena
3:49 - Robert Mastrosimone (1); 18:45 - Neil Shea (2)		First period		Will Zmolek (1) - pp - 3:34; Liam Walsh (2) - 4:10
4:13 - Uula Ruikka (1)		Second period		Aidan McDonough (2) - 4:24
No scoring		Third period		No scoring
No scoring		First overtime period		Aidan McDonough (3) - pp - 9:22
Justin Robbins (19 saves / 23 shots)		Goalie stats		Blake Pietila (16 saves / 19 shots)

April 23	Cedar Rapids RoughRiders	1 – 3	Chicago Steel	Cedar Rapids Ice Arena
No scoring		First period	Christian Sarlo (2) - 6:07; Uula Ruikka (2) - 7:38
0:38 - Aidan McDonough (4)		Second period	No scoring
No scoring		Third period	Gunnarwolfe Fontaine (1) - 1:28
Blake Pietila (20 saves / 23 shots)		Goalie stats	Justin Robbins (24 saves / 25 shots)

April 24	Cedar Rapids RoughRiders	1 – 4	Chicago Steel	Cedar Rapids Ice Arena
No scoring		First period	Nick Abruzzese (3) - 19:49
18:50 - Jack O'Leary (1)		Second period	John Spetz (2) - pp - 1:28
No scoring		Third period	Robert Mastrosimone (2) - 6:07; Robert Mastrosimone (3) - 17:26
Blake Pietila (22 saves / 26 shots)		Goalie stats	Justin Robbins (17 saves / 18 shots)

Chicago wins series 3 – 1

=== Western Conference ===
==== (W1) Tri-City Storm vs. (W4) Des Moines Buccaneers ====
April 19	Tri-City Storm	8 – 3	Des Moines Buccaneers	Viaero Center
2:34 - pp - Brendan Budy (1); 4:52 - Brendan Furry (1); 5:55 - Filip Forsmark (1); 11:36 - Connor McMenamin (1)		First period	No scoring
11:05 - Shane Pinto (1); Ian Murphy (1); 18:01 - Brendan Furry (3)		Second period	T.J. Walsh (1) - pp - 0:44
No scoring		Third period	Tony Malinowski (1) - sh - 4:23; Tyler Paquette (1) - sh - 5:45
Isaiah Saville (15 saves / 18 shots)		Goalie stats	Roman Durný (20 saves / 28 shots); Kade Phipps (1 save / 1 shot)

April 20	Tri-City Storm	2 – 0	Des Moines Buccaneers	Viaero Center
9:09 - pp - Keaton Pehrson (1); 19:17 - Shane Pinto (2)		First period	No scoring
No scoring		Second period	No scoring
No scoring		Third period	No scoring
Isaiah Saville (29 saves / 29 shots)		Goalie stats	Roman Durný (23 saves / 25 shots)

April 23	Des Moines Buccaneers	1 – 5	Tri-City Storm	Buccaneer Arena
No scoring		First period	Joe Berg (1) - 19:38
18:01 - pp - Matt Brown (4)		Second period	Brendan Furry (4) - pp - 2:16
No scoring		Third period	Benji Eckerle (1) - 2:24; Shane Pinto (3) - 12:31; Connor McMenamin (2) - pp - en - 18:21
Roman Durný (28 saves / 32 shots)		Goalie stats	Isaiah Saville (37 saves / 38 shots)

Tri-City wins series 3 – 0

==== (W2) Waterloo Black Hawks vs. (W3) Sioux Falls Stampede ====
April 19	Waterloo Black Hawks	2 – 3	OT	Sioux Falls Stampede	Young Arena
No scoring		First period		No scoring
9:18 - pp - Matěj Blümel (1); 15:05 - Griffin Ness (1)		Second period		Matthew Kessel (1) - 5:44
No scoring		Third period		Max Crozier (1) - pp - 10:32
No scoring		First overtime period		Sam Stevens (1) - 19:30
Evan Fear (31 saves / 34 shots)		Goalie stats		Jaxson Stauber (35 saves / 37 shots)

April 20	Waterloo Black Hawks	6 – 0	Sioux Falls Stampede	Young Arena
4:59 - Matt Cameron (1); 16:57 - pp - Hank Sorensen (1)		First period	No scoring
10:31 - pp - Brehdan Engum (1); 13:59 - pp - Matěj Blümel (2)		Second period	No scoring
5:29 - Teddy Lagerback (1); 11:08 - pp - Matěj Blümel (3)		Third period	No scoring
Evan Fear (26 saves / 26 shots)		Goalie stats	Jaxson Stauber (23 saves / 27 shots); Josh Langford (8 saves / 10 shots)

April 23	Sioux Falls Stampede	6 – 2	Waterloo Black Hawks	Denny Sanford Premier Center
No scoring		First period	No scoring
9:14 - Jared Westcott (2); 11:46 - Jami Krannila (1); 13:15 - Brian Chambers (1); 14:34 - Brenden Olson (1)		Second period	Kyle Haskins (1) - 13:28; Xander Lamppa (1) - pp - 16:24
8:58 - Cade Borchardt (1); 18:13 - pp - Ryan Johnson (1)		Third period	No scoring
Jaxson Stauber (27 saves / 29 shots)		Goalie stats	Evan Fear (11 saves / 14 shots); Jared Moe (14 saves / 17 shots)

April 24	Sioux Falls Stampede	2 – 1	OT	Waterloo Black Hawks	Denny Sanford Premier Center
No scoring		First period		No scoring
No scoring		Second period		Kyle Haskins (2) - pp - 14:01
15:55 - pp - Max Crozier (2)		Third period		No scoring
8:25 - Brian Chambers (2)		First overtime period		No scoring
Jaxson Stauber (29 saves / 30 shots)		Goalie stats		Evan Fear (26 saves / 28 shots)

Sioux Falls wins series 3 – 1

== Conference Finals ==
=== Eastern Conference ===
==== (E1) Muskegon Lumberjacks vs. (E2) Chicago Steel ====
April 27	Muskegon Lumberjacks	4 – 5	OT	Chicago Steel	L.C. Walker Arena
17:41 - pp - Mikael Hakkarainen (2); 18:28 - pp - Mikael Hakkarainen (3)		First period		No scoring
7:03 - pp - Jagger Joshua (3)		Second period		Gunnarwolfe Fontaine (2) - 1:06; Josiah Slavin (1) - 7:44
2:41 - Bobby Lynch (2)		Third period		Nick Abruzzese (4) - 2:53; Josiah Slavin (2) - pp - 19:57
No scoring		First overtime period		Nick Abruzzese (5) - 5:16
Brandon Bussi (29 saves / 34 shots)		Goalie stats		Justin Robbins (36 saves / 40 shots)

April 28	Muskegon Lumberjacks	3 – 2	Chicago Steel	L.C. Walker Arena
0:19 - Jagger Joshua (4); 13:01 - Mikael Hakkarainen (4)		First period	Robert Mastrosimone (4) - 9:46
1:34 - Jack Williams (2)		Second period	No scoring
No scoring		Third period	Gunnarwolfe Fontaine (3) - pp - 0:22
Brandon Bussi (24 saves / 26 shots)		Goalie stats	Justin Robbins (28 saves / 31 shots)

May 3	Chicago Steel	4 – 1	Muskegon Lumberjacks	Fox Valley Ice Arena
3:12 - Robert Mastrosimone (5)		First period	No scoring
3:34 - pp - Nick Abruzzese (6); 9:48 - sh - Robert Mastrosimone (6)		Second period	Nolan Sullivan (2) - 1:57
1:34 - Neil Shea (3)		Third period	No scoring
Justin Robbins (35 saves / 36 shots)		Goalie stats	Brandon Bussi (23 saves / 27 shots)

May 4	Chicago Steel	3 – 2	OT	Muskegon Lumberjacks	Fox Valley Ice Arena
No scoring		First period		No scoring
No scoring		Second period		No scoring
5:25 - pp - Nick Abruzzese (7); 11:09 - Gunnarwolfe Fontaine (4)		Third period		Egor Afanasyev (2) - pp - 7:15; Ryan Savage (2) - 19:31
1:13 - Gunnarwolfe Fontaine (5)		First overtime period		No scoring
Justin Robbins (30 saves / 32 shots)		Goalie stats		Brandon Bussi (13 saves / 16 shots)

Chicago wins series 3 – 1

=== Western Conference ===
==== (W1) Tri-City Storm vs. (W3) Sioux Falls Stampede ====
April 30	Tri-City Storm	0 – 3	Sioux Falls Stampede	Viaero Center
No scoring		First period	No scoring
		Second period	Blake Bride (1) - 6:32; Andre Lee (3) - pp - 10:56
No scoring		Third period	Cade Borchardt (2) - 15:48
Isaiah Saville (16 saves / 19 shots)		Goalie stats	Jaxson Stauber (24 saves / 24 shots)

May 1	Tri-City Storm	1 – 4	Sioux Falls Stampede	Viaero Center
17:41 - Filip Forsmark (2)		First period	No scoring
No scoring		Second period	Carl Berglund (1) - 17:01; Andre Lee (4) - 17:19
No scoring		Third period	Max Crozier (3) - 7:45; Jared Westcott (3) - pp - en - 18:40
Isaiah Saville (18 saves / 21 shots)		Goalie stats	Jaxson Stauber (31 saves / 32 shots)

May 3	Sioux Falls Stampede	3 – 2	Tri-City Storm	Denny Sanford Premier Center
5:18 - Austen Swankler (2); 9:39 - Jami Krannila (2)		First period	No scoring
No scoring		Second period	No scoring
19:09 - Brian Chambers (3)		Third period	Benji Eckerle (2) - 3:08; Shane Pinto (4) - pp - 10:09
Jaxson Stauber (28 saves / 30 shots)		Goalie stats	Isaiah Saville (17 saves / 20 shots)

Sioux Falls wins series 3 – 0

== Clark Cup Championship ==
=== (E2) Chicago Steel vs. (W3) Sioux Falls Stampede ===
May 10	Sioux Falls Stampede	3 – 2	Chicago Steel	Denny Sanford Premier Center
No scoring		First period	No scoring
Carl Berglund (2) - 0:51; Andre Lee (5) - 6:37		Second period	11:04 - Josiah Slavin (3)
Jared Westcott (4) - 14:59		Third period	2:32 - John Spetz (3)
Jaxson Stauber (20 saves / 22 shots)		Goalie stats	Justin Robbins (26 saves / 29 shots)

May 12	Sioux Falls Stampede	3 – 2	2OT	Chicago Steel	Denny Sanford Premier Center
No scoring		First period		14:06 - Gunnarwolfe Fontaine (6)
Max Crozier (4) - 15:41		Second period		No scoring
Sam Stevens (2) - 17:10		Third period		12:05 - pp - Robert Mastrosimone (7)
Andre Lee (6) - 16:05		Second overtime period		No scoring
Jaxson Stauber (30 saves / 32 shots)		Goalie stats		Justin Robbins (33 saves / 36 shots)

May 17	Chicago Steel	1 – 5	Sioux Falls Stampede	Fox Valley Ice Arena
No scoring		First period	17:42 - pp - Anthony Romano (1)
No scoring		Second period	4:22 - Blake Bride (2); 15:23 - sh - Sam Stevens (3)
Josiah Slavin (4) - 16:06		Third period	18:33 - en - Jared Westcott (5); 18:40 - en - Ryan Johnson (2)
Justin Robbins (12 saves / 15 shots)		Goalie stats	Jaxson Stauber (20 saves / 21 shots)

Sioux Falls wins series 3 – 0

== Playoff scoring leaders ==
Note: GP = Games played; G = Goals; A = Assists; Pts = Points; PIM = Penalty minutes

Player	Team	GP	G	A	Pts	PIM
Robert Mastrosimone	Chicago Steel	11	7	8	15	4
Nick Abruzzese	Chicago Steel	11	7	7	14	0
Gunnarwolfe Fontaine	Chicago Steel	9	6	6	12	2
Andre Lee	Sioux Falls Stampede	12	6	5	11	10
Max Crozier	Sioux Falls Stampede	12	4	7	11	10
Bobby Lynch	Muskegon Lumberjacks	8	2	8	10	12
Jason Polin	Cedar Rapids RoughRiders	6	5	4	9	4
Shane Pinto	Tri-City Storm	6	4	5	9	8
Mikael Hakkarainen	Muskegon Lumberjacks	8	4	5	9	12
Matteo Pietroniro	Chicago Steel	11	1	8	9	10

== Playoff leading goaltenders ==
Note: GP = Games played; Mins = Minutes played; W = Wins; L = Losses; GA = Goals Allowed; SO = Shutouts; SV% = Save percentage; GAA = Goals against average

Player	Team	GP	Mins	W	L	GA	SO	SV%	GAA
Jaxson Stauber	Sioux Falls Stampede	12	821	11	1	20	1	.941	1.46
Ben Kraws	Sioux City Musketeers	2	181	0	2	5	0	.936	1.66
Evan Fear	Waterloo Black Hawks	4	241	1	3	8	1	.922	1.99
Isaiah Saville	Tri-City Storm	6	355	3	3	13	1	.910	2.20
Justin Robbins	Chicago Steel	11	704	6	5	28	0	.910	2.38

== Post season awards ==
=== USHL awards ===
Award	Name	Team
Player of the Year	Ronnie Attard	Tri-City Storm
Forward of the Year	Bobby Brink	Sioux City Musketeers
Defenseman of the Year	Ronnie Attard	Tri-City Storm
Rookie of the Year	Zac Jones	Tri-City Storm
Goaltender of the Year	Isaiah Saville	Tri-City Storm
Coach of the Year	Anthony Noreen	Tri-City Storm
Scholar-Athlete	Mason McCormick	Dubuque Fighting Saints
Curt Hammer	Liam Walsh	Cedar Rapids RoughRiders
General Manager of the Year	Ryan Hardy	Chicago Steel
Executive of the Year	Jim Olander	Sioux Falls Stampede
Organization of the Year	Muskegon Lumberjacks	

=== All-USHL First Team ===
Pos	Name	Team
G	Isaiah Saville	Tri-City
D	Ronnie Attard	Tri-City
D	Alex Yakovenko	Muskegon
F	Nick Abruzzese	Chicago
F	Bobby Brink	Sioux City
F	Brett Murray	Youngstown

=== All-USHL Second Team ===
Pos	Name	Team
G	Blake Pietila	Cedar Rapids
D	Zac Jones	Tri-City
D	Matteo Pietroniro	Chicago
F	Matt Brown	Des Moines
F	Matias Maccelli	Dubuque
F	Ben Meyers	Fargo

=== All-Rookie First Team ===
Pos	Name	Team
G	Isaiah Saville	Tri-City
D	Ryan Johnson	Sioux Falls
D	Zac Jones	Tri-City
F	Vladislav Firstov	Waterloo
F	Marcus Kallionkieli	Sioux City
F	Shane Pinto	Tri-City

=== All-Rookie Second Team ===
Pos	Name	Team
G	Logan Stein	Waterloo
D	Anthony Kehrer	Sioux City
D	Owen Power	Chicago
F	Josh Nodler	Fargo
F	Anthony Romano	Sioux Falls
F	Grant Silianoff	Cedar Rapids
