= Jaxson Stauber =

American ice hockey player (born 1999)

- Born: April 27, 1999 (age 27) Wayzata, Minnesota, U.S.
- Height: 6 ft 3 in (191 cm)
- Weight: 174 lb (79 kg; 12 st 6 lb)
- Position: Goaltender
- Catches: Left
- NHL team (P) Cur. team Former teams: Utah Mammoth; Tucson Roadrunners (AHL); Chicago Blackhawks
- NHL draft: Undrafted
- Playing career: 2022–present

Jaxson Stauber (born April 27, 1999) is an American professional ice hockey player who is a goaltender for the Tucson Roadrunners of the American Hockey League (AHL) while under contract to the Utah Mammoth of the National Hockey League (NHL). He played college ice hockey for the Providence Friars.

== Playing career ==
Stauber played for the Sioux Falls Stampede of the United States Hockey League (USHL) from 2017 until 2019 when he committed to play for the Minnesota State Mavericks. He played one game with Minnesota State and returned to the Stampede on November 26, 2019. On February 9, 2020, Stauber committed to play for the Providence Friars.

After two seasons with Providence College, Stauber opted to turn professional and on March 23, 2022, signed a two-year, entry-level contract with the Chicago Blackhawks. In his NHL debut on January 21, 2023, Stauber made 29 saves in the Blackhawks' 5–3 win over the St. Louis Blues. Stauber later became the first Blackhawks goaltender to start his NHL career with a 3–0–0 record following subsequent wins over the Calgary Flames and Arizona Coyotes.

During the 2023–24 season, on February 16, 2024, Stauber became the first AHL goaltender to score a goal and record a shutout in the same game en route to the Rockford IceHogs' 4–0 win over the Chicago Wolves.

As a free agent from the Blackhawks, Stauber was signed to a one-year, two-way contract with the Utah Mammoth (the then Utah Hockey Club) on July 5, 2024. On November 30, Stauber recorded his first NHL shutout in a 6–0 win over the Vegas Golden Knights.

== Personal life ==
Stauber is the son of Robb Stauber who is a former NHL goaltender.

== Career statistics ==
			Regular season									Playoffs
Season	Team	League	GP	W	L	T/OT	MIN	GA	SO	GAA	SV%	GP	W	L	MIN	GA	SO	GAA	SV%
2014–15	Holy Family Catholic	USHS	4	—	—	—	—	—	—	3.79	.845	—	—	—	—	—	—	—	—
2015–16	Holy Family Catholic	USHS	11	—	—	—	—	—	—	1.24	.940	1	—	—	—	—	—	0.00	1.000
2016–17	Victory Honda	T1EHL	18	—	—	—	—	—	—	2.36	.922	4	—	—	—	—	—	1.33	.944
2017–18	Sioux Falls Stampede	USHL	22	8	6	2	1,107	57	0	3.09	.900	1	0	0	9	0	0	0.00	1.000
2018–19	Sioux Falls Stampede	USHL	29	16	8	1	1,506	73	1	2.91	.883	12	11	1	821	20	1	1.46	.941
2019–20	Minnesota State University, Mankato	WCHA	1	1	0	0	60	1	0	1.00	.933	—	—	—	—	—	—	—	—
2019–20	Sioux Falls Stampede	USHL	24	14	6	4	1,420	58	1	2.45	.918	—	—	—	—	—	—	—	—
2020–21	Providence College	HE	23	11	7	5	1,393	52	4	2.24	.916	—	—	—	—	—	—	—	—
2021–22	Providence College	HE	37	21	14	2	2,204	77	4	2.10	.921	—	—	—	—	—	—	—	—
2022–23	Rockford IceHogs	AHL	17	6	8	0	885	49	0	3.32	.894	—	—	—	—	—	—	—	—
2022–23	Chicago Blackhawks	NHL	6	5	1	0	364	17	0	2.81	.911	—	—	—	—	—	—	—	—
2023–24	Rockford IceHogs	AHL	31	18	8	3	1,811	86	2	2.85	.902	1	0	1	64	3	0	2.80	.919
2024–25	Tucson Roadrunners	AHL	21	12	7	2	1,260	66	0	3.14	.897	2	1	1	115	5	0	2.61	.935
2024–25	Utah Hockey Club	NHL	6	2	1	0	313	17	1	3.26	.892	—	—	—	—	—	—	—	—
2025–26	Tucson Roadrunners	AHL	36	15	15	6	2,112	108	2	3.07	.889	—	—	—	—	—	—	—	—
NHL totals			12	7	2	1	677	34	1	3.01	.903	—	—	—	—	—	—	—	—

== Awards and honors ==
Award	Year	Ref
USHL
Clark Cup MVP	2019	
Clark Cup champion	2019	
Second All-Star Team	2020	
