= Gunnarwolfe Fontaine =

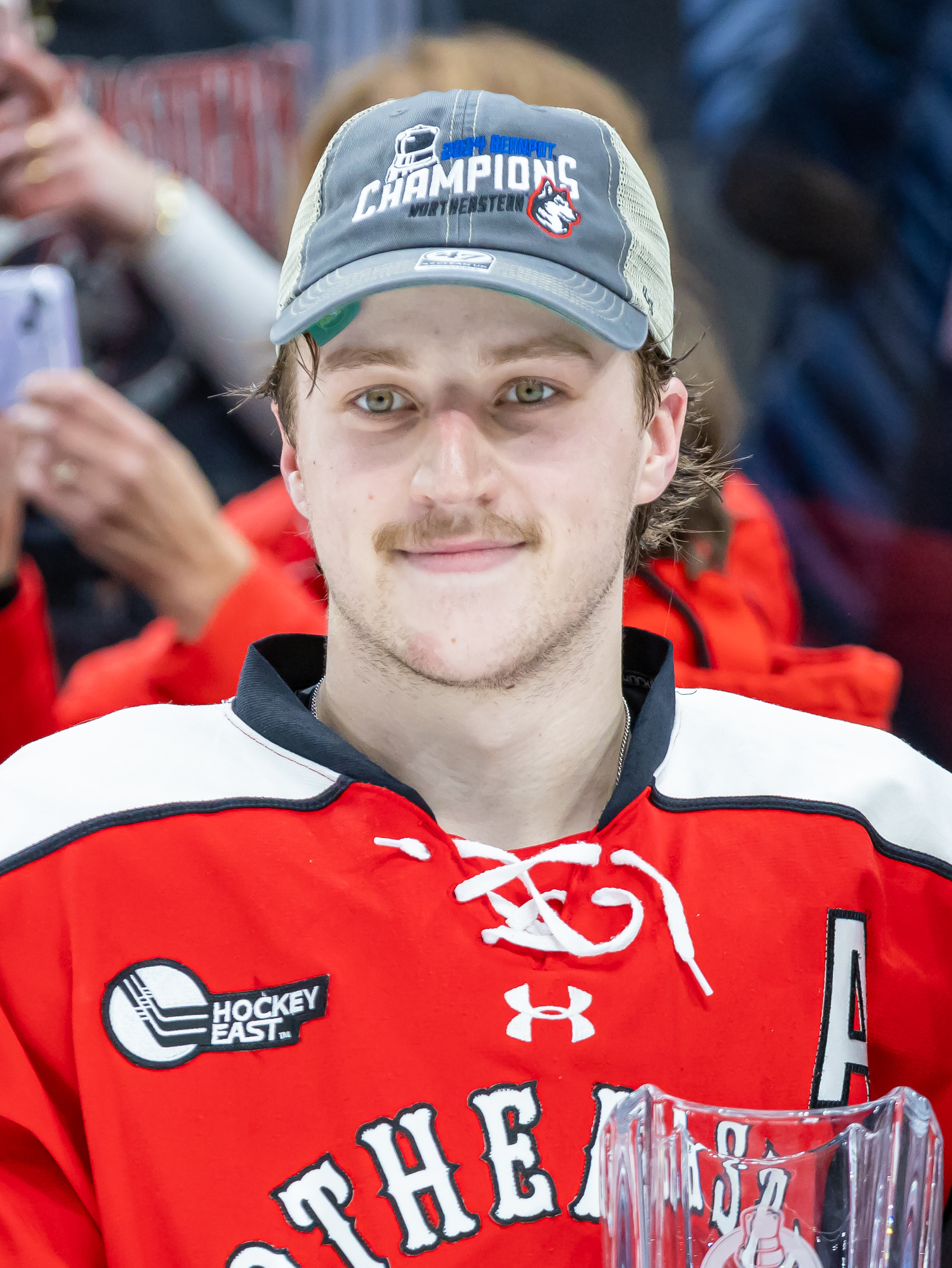
- Fontaine with Northeastern in 2024
- Born: September 16, 2000 (age 26) East Greenwich, Rhode Island, U.S.
- Height: 5 ft 10 in (178 cm)
- Weight: 178 lb (81 kg; 12 st 10 lb)
- Position: Forward
- Shoots: Left
- ICEHL team Former teams: HC Pustertal Wölfe; Iowa Wild
- NHL draft: 202nd overall, 2020; Nashville Predators
- Playing career: 2025–present

Gunnarwolfe Fontaine (born September 16, 2000) is an American professional ice hockey forward for HC Pustertal Wölfe of the ICE Hockey League (ICEHL). He has previously played for Northeastern University and Ohio State University of the National Collegiate Athletic Association (NCAA). He was drafted in the seventh round, 202nd overall, by the Nashville Predators.

== Playing career ==
=== Amateur ===
Fontaine started playing in the United States Hockey League (USHL) with the Chicago Steel in the 2018–19 season. He was immediately a star, scoring 20 goals and 23 assists in 60 games. He would also score six goals and six assists in nine games in the Clark Cup Playoffs, where the Steel would fall in three games to the Sioux Falls Stampede. However, the successful season established Fontaine as a rising star in hockey.

Fonatine would continue his scoring success with the Steel the following season, scoring 26 goals and 31 assists in 45 games. Everything seemed to be clicking for the Fontaine and the Steel, who were sitting atop the league standings when the season was abruptly suspended on March 12, 2020, due to the COVID-19 pandemic. Five days later, on March 18, the rest of the season was canceled as well. Although a disappointing end to Fonatine's USHL career, the Steel were awarded the Anderson Cup at season's end as regular season champions.

=== Collegiate ===
==== Northeastern University ====
In early 2018, Fontaine had verbally committed to play college hockey at Rensselaer Polytechnic Institute. However, before his college career started, he flipped his commitment to Northeastern University.

Even with the delayed start to the 2020–21 season, Fontaine started his freshman year off at Northeastern right where he left off in the USHL, scoring six goals and nine assists in 15 games. Unfortunately, Northeastern would struggle throughout the season due to the late start, and would finish a mediocre 9-9-3, losing out on a tournament berth.

With a normal start to the season, Fontaine and the Huskies got back on track. They would go 16-8-1 through the end of January, and would enter the Hockey East tournament as the one-seed. However, they would lose in the semi-finals to UConn. They would, however, earn an at-large bid in the 2022 NCAA tournament, where they lose in the first round to Western Michigan. Fontaine would finish the season eight goals and 17 assists in 39 games.

In Fontaine's junior season, Northeastern would have another solid season. They would finish 17-13-5 and ranked #16. However, a first round loss to Providence in the Hockey East tournament prevented the Huskies from earning a spot in the tournament. However, Northeastern would win the annual Beanpot tournament, their fourth in five years. Fontaine would play a big role in the Huskies victory, scoring two goals in the championship game against Harvard. At season's ended, Fontaine posted his best season yet in college, with ten goals and 20 assists in 35 games.

Fontaine would enter his senior year at Northeastern with high expectations. Unfortunately, they would not live up to these expectations, finishing unranked at 17-16-3. Fontaine's production also took a slight dip, with eight goals and 19 assists in 36 games. However, two of those goals were the most important in his career thus far, as he scored the overtime winners in both the semi-final and championship of the 2024 Beanpot, against Harvard and Boston University, respectively. In addition to two assists, Fontaine's efforts led to him being named tournament MVP.

On March 18, 2024, Fontaine entered the transfer portal.

==== Ohio State University ====
After entering the portal, Fontaine committed to playing at Ohio State as a graduate transfer.

The Buckeyes got off to a hot spot, starting off 7-0-1, and Fontaine was a big part of the success. On October 25, 2024, Fontaine scored his 100th career collegiate point on an assist on a Davis Burnside goal against Bowling Green. His first goal as a Buckeye came the next game, a 9-3 win over Lake Superior State.

Fontaine continued his tradition of clutch scoring upon transferring to Ohio State. In the 2024 Big Ten tournament semifinals, Fontaine scored the overtime winner against Penn State to advance the Buckeyes to the tournament finals, the program's first since 2018. In the finals against Michigan State, with Ohio State down 3-2 late in the third period, Fonatine scored the game-tying goal with a little over two minutes remaining to force overtime. The game would go into double overtime, where the Buckeyes would fall to the Spartans 4-3. Fontaine's efforts led him to be named to the All-Tournament Team. He was also named an Honorable Mention for the All-Big Ten team.

Fontaine would find himself once again facing off against Boston University in the first round of the NCAA tournament. However, this time wouldn't be as successful as previous games. Despite holding a lead three times in the game, the Buckeyes were embarrassed by the Terriers 8-3, ending their season. Fontaine was held scoreless in the loss. In his lone season at Ohio State, Fontaine scored 17 goals and 23 assists in 40 games, all career highs. He led the Buckeyes in points, was tied for first in goals, and second in assists. His 40 points also put him tied for fourth in points amongst the Big Ten Conference, marking his most successful season yet.

=== Professional ===
On April 2, 2025, Fontaine officially concluded his collegiate career by signing an amateur try-out contract (ATO), with the Iowa Wild. Fontaine would go scoreless in six games with the Wild, who did not make the playoffs.

On July 9, 2025, Fontaine signed a one-year, AHL contract with the Toronto Marlies.

Fontaine would spend the entire regular season with the Marlies ECHL affiliate, the Cincinnati Cyclones, where he would once again show off his goal-scoring prowess. Fontaine would score 21 goals and 24 points in 71 games, good for second on the team in goals, and third in total points.

On June 12, 2026, it was announced that Fontaine would make the jump overseas, joining HC Pustertal Wölfe of the ICE Hockey League.

== Personal ==
Fontaine has gained national recognition for his unique name. When asked about, he said his mom wanted him to have a distinctive name, and was originally going to name him "Wolf", but later changed it to "Gunnarwolfe".

Fontaine's sister, Skylar Fontaine, is a professional ice hockey player for ZSC Lions Frauen of the Swiss Women's League.

== Career statistics ==
			Regular season					Playoffs
Season	Team	League	GP	G	A	Pts	PIM	GP	G	A	Pts	PIM
2018–19	Chicago Steel	USHL	60	20	23	43	4	9	6	6	12	2
2019–20	Chicago Steel	USHL	45	26	31	57	18	—	—	—	—	—
2020–21	Northeastern	HE	21	6	9	15	29	—	—	—	—	—
2021–22	Northeastern	HE	39	8	17	25	20	—	—	—	—	—
2022–23	Northeastern	HE	35	10	20	30	8	—	—	—	—	—
2023–24	Northeastern	HE	36	8	19	27	6	—	—	—	—	—
2024–25	Ohio State University	B1G	40	17	23	40	6	—	—	—	—	—
2024–25	Iowa Wild	AHL	5	0	0	0	0	—	—	—	—	—
2025–26	Cincinnati Cyclones	ECHL	71	21	24	45	28	—	—	—	—	—
AHL totals			5	0	0	0	0	—	—	—	—	—

== Awards and honors ==
Award	Year	Ref
College
All-Hockey East Rookie Team	2021	
Beanpot MVP	2024	
Big Ten All-Tournament Team	2025	
All-Big Ten Honorable Mention	2025	
