= Château de la Fontaine (Anse) =

Château in Anse, Rhône, France

Coordinates: 45°57′01″N 4°42′45″E

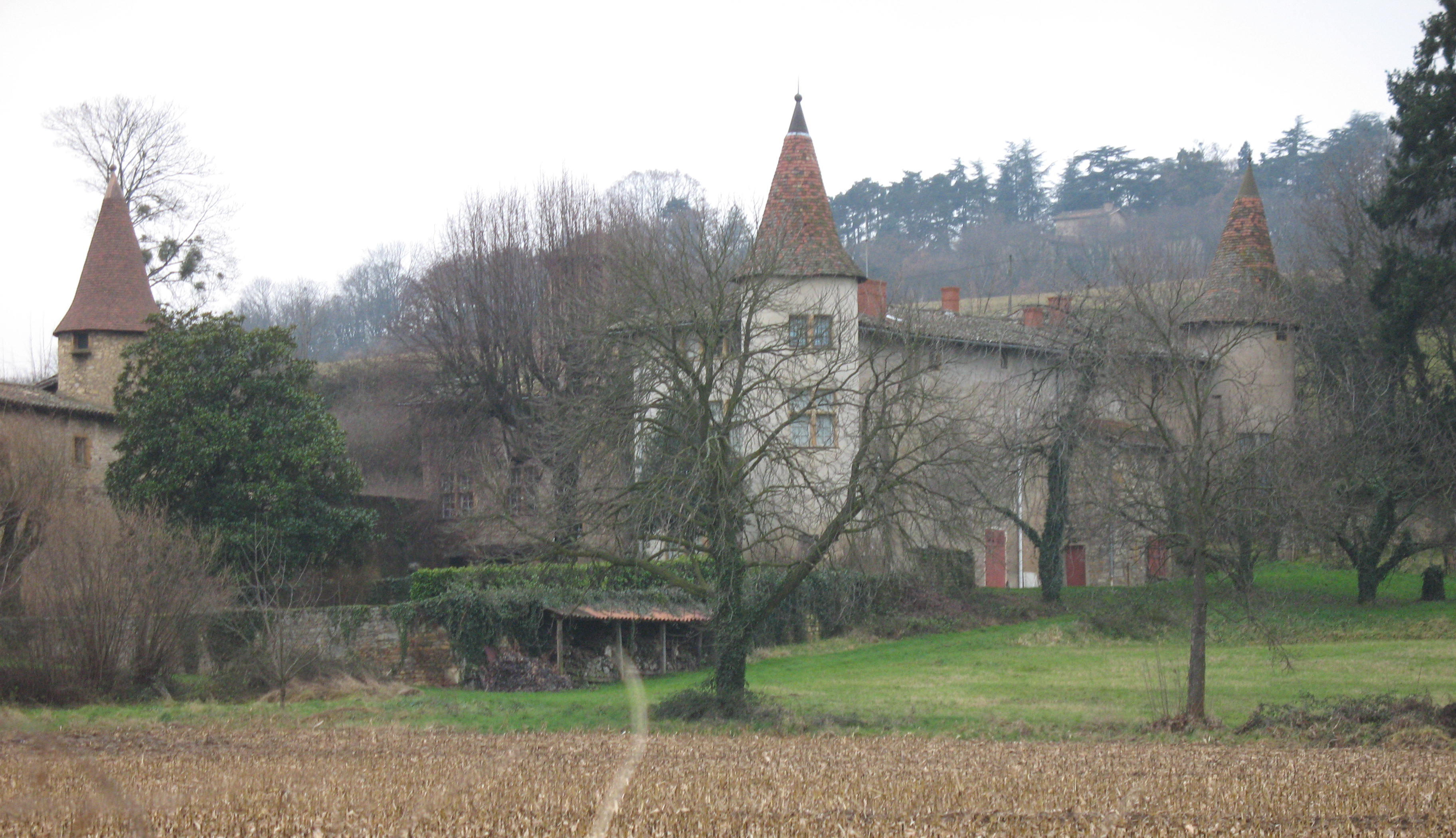

Château de la Fontaine is a château in Anse, Rhône, France. It was built in the 16th century.
