= Jean Fontaine =

French writer and theologian (1936–2021)

- Born: 2 December 1936; Saint-André-lez-Lille, France
- Died: 1 May 2021 (aged 84); Tunis, Tunisia
- Occupations: Writer; Theologian

Jean Fontaine (2 December 1936 – 1 May 2021) was a French writer, theologian, and missionary.

== Biography ==
In 1953, Fontaine earned a bachelor's degree in mathematics. On 15 September 1955, he left for Algeria as part of the White Fathers. From 1956 to 1957, he studied theology at Saint-Joseph de Thibar in Tunisia before becoming a teacher in Algeria. He then took three years of theology courses in Carthage and Arabic studied in Manouba from 1962 to 1964. From 1964 to 1965, he completed his Arabic studies at the Pontifical Institute of Arab and Islamic Studies in Rome. In 1968, he obtained a licentiate in Arabic from Tunis University. From 1968 to 1977, he was a librarian at the Institut des belles lettres arabes and directed the journal Ibla from 1977 to 1999. He earned a doctorate from the University of Provence in 1977.

Jean Fontaine died from COVID-19 on 1 May 2021, at the age of 84 in Tunis, Tunisia.

== Publications ==
- Vingt ans de littérature tunisienne 1956-1975 (1977)
- Mort-résurrection : une lecture de Tawfiq al-Hakim (1978)
- Aspects de la littérature tunisienne 1976-1983 (1985)
- Histoire de la littérature tunisienne par les textes, t. I : Des origines à la fin du XIIe siècle (1988)
- Études de la littérature tunisienne 1984-1987 (1989)
- La littérature tunisienne contemporaine (1990)
- Écrivaines tunisiennes (1990)
- Regards sur la littérature tunisienne (1991)
- Romans arabes modernes (1992)
- Histoire de la littérature tunisienne par les textes, t. II : Du XIIIe siècle à l'indépendance (1994)
- La crise religieuse des écrivains syro-libanais chrétiens de 1825 à 1940 (1996)
- Bibliographie de la littérature tunisienne contemporaine en arabe 1954-1996 (1997)
- Propos de littérature tunisienne 1881-1993 (1998)
- La blessure de l'âne (1998)
- Recherches de littérature arabe moderne (1998)
- Itinéraire dans le pays de l'autre (1998)
- Histoire de la littérature tunisienne par les textes, t. III : De l'indépendance à nos jours (1999)
- Le roman tunisien de langue arabe. 1956-2001 (2002)
- Kalimât muhâjira (2002)
- Le roman tunisien de langue française (2004)
- Points de suspension… (2008)
- Le roman tunisien a 100 ans (1906-2006) (2009)
- Traduction de Noureddine Alaoui. Une musette de mirages (2010)
- Bréviaire des prisonniers étrangers en Tunisie (2012)
- Du côté des salafistes en Tunisie (2016)
