= Lycée La Fontaine =

Lycée La Fontaine may refer to:

- Lycée La Fontaine (Paris), France
- Lycée La Fontaine (Niger)
