= Ida LaFontaine =

Musical artist

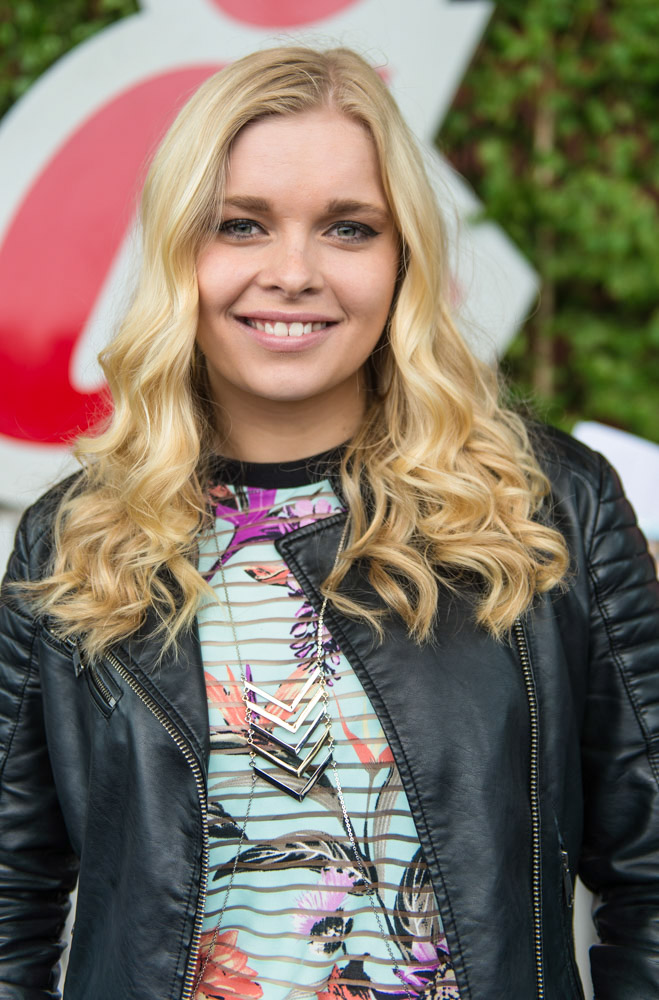
- Fontaine in 2015

Background information
- Born: 19 May 1997 (age 29); Sollentuna, Sweden
- Genres: Pop music
- Occupations: singer, songwriter
- Years active: 2011–present
- Label: Universal (2014–present)

Ida LaFontaine (born 19 May 1997) is a Swedish pop singer, songwriter and dancer. She started singing at the age of 10 when she sang on Måns Zelmerlöw's track "Hold On". She also participated in Lilla Melodifestivalen in 2011. In 2012, she was contracted by Warner Music and in September of the same year her first music single "Dancing 4 My Life" was released. On 7 August 2014, she released the single "Anthem".

In late 2014, Ida LaFontaine was contacted by Universal and Polydor which signed her up as a new recording singer. Her first music single with her label was "Shut Up and Kiss Me".

== Discography ==
=== Singles ===
==== As lead artist ====
List of singles as lead artist
Title	Year	Album
"Dancing 4 My Life"	2012	Non-album singles
"YOLO"	2013	Non-album singles
"Anthem"	2015	Non-album singles
"Shut Up and Kiss Me"	2015	Non-album singles
"Go Again"	2016	Non-album singles
"Cold"	2016	Non-album singles

==== Promotional singles ====
List of promotional singles
Title	Year	Album
"Se mig"	2011	Non-album singles
"Dear Darlin'"	2013	Non-album singles
"Mad"	2014	Non-album singles
"It's Christmas Time Again"	2015	Non-album singles
