= Yves Lafontaine =

Canadian musician

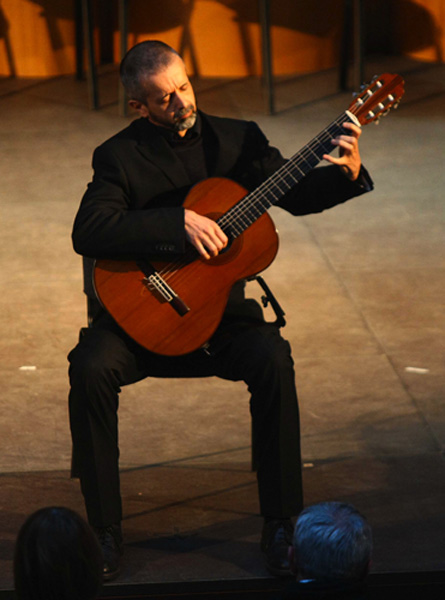
- Yves Lafontaine, charity concert for the victims of the 2011 earthquake in Japan at the auditorium of the Chamber of Commerce of Cremona in Italy
- Born: Yves Joseph Lafontaine; 16 July 1959 (age 67); Grand-Mère, Québec, Canada
- Occupations: Musician, luthier, writer
- Years active: 1979–present

Yves Lafontaine (born 16 July 1959), is a Canadian musician, luthier and writer.

== Early life ==
The son of Jeanne d'Arc Lafontaine (née Bussière), an amateur painter and Henri Lafontaine, an amateur singer and bank clerk, Lafontaine was born in Grand-Mère, Quebec. Sixth child born unto a family of seven siblings, he began studying music as a child after being entranced by the music of J.S. Bach and W.A. Mozart. Taking up classical guitar as a teenager, by his early 20s he had developed a "brilliant technique that enables him to loose himself completely in the intensity of the moment".

== Education ==
In the late 1970s and early 80s, he attended the Conservatoire de Musique du Québec à Trois-Rivières, where he studied classical guitar with Jean Vallières, chamber music with Walter Joachim and viola with Alfred Filek. At the end of the second cycle, he left the conservatory and began playing classical guitar professionally. He attended the masterclasses held by Raymond Sealey at Lake McDonald in 1979.

He moved to Nice, France in 1983 where he furthered his classical guitar studies with Alexandre Lagoya and Carel Harms at the Académie Internationale d'Eté de Nice. He also enrolled in the musical analysis classes of Jacques Chailley and the conducting classes of Fernand Quattrocchi while sojourning in France. Pursuing research at the Bavarian State Library in Germany and Spain's National Library at Madrid in 1985–86, he deepened his knowledge of the various notational systems in use for the lute during the Renaissance and early Baroque period.

Upon returning to Canada, he attended McGill University at Montréal, graduating with a bachelor's degree in East Asian Studies in 1991. On a grant from the Japanese government, he enrolled in 1991 an intensive Japanese language course at Tsukuba University, followed by conducting studies at the Tokyo University of Fine Arts and Music. In 2007 he completed a violin bow making course with Giovanni Lucchi and Pierre Guillaume offered by the administration of the Lombardy region. In 2008 he graduated from the "Antonio Stradivari" violin making school of Cremona, where he studied violin making with Ernesto Vaia, Giorgio Scolari, and Lorenzo Marchi. Furthermore, in 2010 he graduated from the same institution in violin restoration after studies with Alessandro Voltini, Claudio Amighetti and Andrea Ortona.

== Personal life ==
On 9 September 1993, Lafontaine married Yuko Ideguchi, whom he met while studying at Tsukuba University. The couple have four children. Lafontaine has an apartment in the Kanto plain of Japan, and holds Canadian citizenship in addition to dual Japanese-Italian residency. He speaks fluent English, German, French, Italian, Spanish and Japanese. Lafontaine is a fervent swimmer and good hiker, activities he considers essential to his well-being.

== Career ==
=== Conductor ===
Lafontaine began his career in Canada as choir conductor, switching later to instrumental formations for which he sometimes provided arrangements as well. Since the 1990s he has been active principally in Japan where he was principal conductor of the Narita Philharmonic Orchestra, Makuhari Philharmonic Orchestra, Kyoto Philomusica Orchestra, Haydn Sinfonietta, Opera Fiori of Tokyo and associate conductor of the Philharmonia Tokyo Symphony Orchestra. He is currently active in Italy.

=== Instrumentalist ===
As classical guitarist and Renaissance lutenist whose repertoire extend from the early renaissance to contemporary works, he has appeared as soloist and in chamber music formation in France, Belgium, Austria, Germany, Spain, Norway, Canada, the US and in Asia where he has been featured on radio and television in programs including his own guitar arrangements and transcriptions. He has taken part in the orchestra of the Antonio Stradivari school as violist during two seasons starting in 2006.

=== Writer ===
Mainly active in the fields of French poetry and writings of technical nature related to music.

http://aaso.no/index.php?option=com_content&view=article&id=26:hostkonsert&catid=7:konserter-med-aso&Itemid=32

Combien vite est venu le soir,
déja ai les paupières lourdes.
Au dehors tombe la nuit noire,
lune à la fête est faite sourde.

Ai maintenant le dos courbé,
depuis longtemps jeunesse a fuit.
Affaibli du poid des années
ne chemine plus dans la nuit.

Que me reste-t-il à faire
que d'autre déja ne fut fait?
Conquises sont toutes les terres,
au mieux tranquille en coin me tais.

== Instruments ==
Lafontaine plays the "Girollet" Contreras guitar of 1989 and a Michel'Angelo Bergonzi violin of 1754.

== Awards ==
"Menzione Speciale per l'Acustica" attributed to his viola "Nec Pluribus Impar" at the 2007 Pisogne Violin Making Competition (6) Catalogue NICPASSECH Editrice MILANO - Via Bernardino Telesio, 17

== Discography ==
I CD private label, music of Bach, Scarlatti, Albeniz, Granados, de Falla, Rodrigo, Sor and Pujol
