= Joseph Lafontaine (Shefford MLA) =

Canadian politician

Joseph Lafontaine (August 7, 1829 – June 1907) was a notary, journalist and political figure in Quebec. He represented Shefford in the Legislative Assembly of Quebec from 1878 to 1881 as a Liberal.

He was born Lesiège Lafontaine in Saint-Antoine-de-Lavaltrie, Lower Canada, the son of Abraham Lafontaine and Marie-Thérèse Robillard. He was educated at the Collège de l'Assomption and at Montreal, qualified as a notary in 1856 and set up practice in Saint-Ours. In 1871, he married Céline-Élisa Mongeau. Lafontaine ran unsuccessfully for a seat in the Quebec assembly in 1867 before being elected in 1878. He served as mayor of Roxton Falls from 1880 to 1882. He was also commissioner for the Quebec Superior Court in Bedford district and editor for the Montreal newspaper L'Avenir. Lafontaine died in Roxton Falls.
