= Chicago Steel =

United States Hockey League team

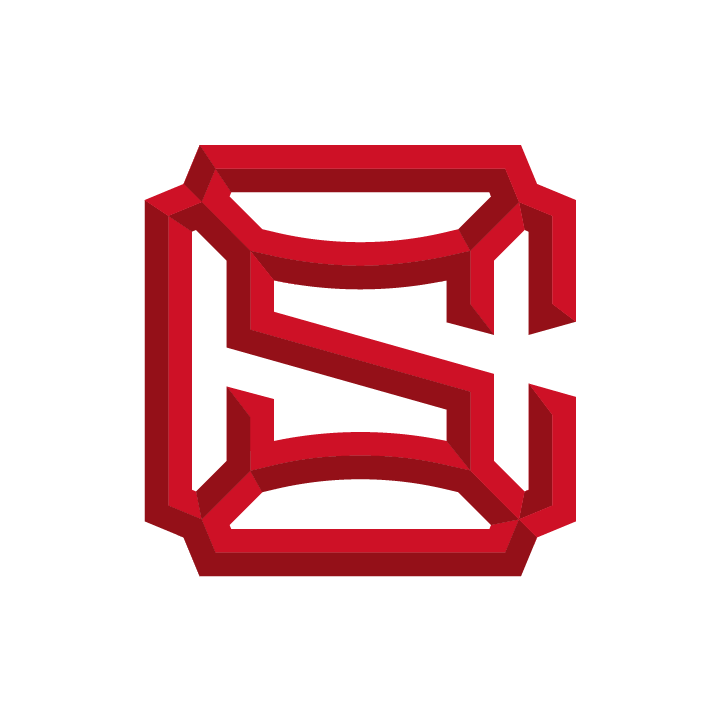
- City: Chicago, Illinois
- League: United States Hockey League
- Conference: Eastern
- Founded: 2000
- Home arena: USG Arena inside Blackhawks Ice Center
- Colors: Red, white, black
- Owner: Wirtz Corporation
- General manager: Bobby Goepfert
- Head coach: Scott Gomez
- Website: chicagosteelhockeyteam.com

Franchise history
- 1996–2000: Fargo-Moorhead Ice Sharks
- 2000–present: Chicago Steel

Championships
- Regular season titles: 2 Anderson Cups (2019–20, 2020–21)
- Playoff championships: 2 Clark Cups (2017, 2021)

The Chicago Steel are a junior ice hockey team that plays in the United States Hockey League since 2000. The Steel play home games at USG Arena inside Blackhawks Ice Center, the practice facility for the Chicago Blackhawks in the Near West Side, Chicago. The Steel won Anderson Cups in 2020 and 2021, Clark Cups in 2017 and 2021, and previously played home games in the Chicago metropolitan area at Fox Valley Ice Arena in Geneva, and at Edge Ice Arena in Bensenville.

== History ==
The Fargo-Moorhead Ice Sharks were founded as a junior ice hockey team in 1996, moved to Bensenville, Illinois, and became the Chicago Steel in 2000. In May 2015, the majority ownership of the Steel was purchased by Larry Robbins while then current owners Bruce Liimatainen and Mike Greenberg remained involved as minority owners. The announcement for the change of ownership was accompanied by a change of leadership as Ryan Bennett and Dan Muse were hired as the new general manager and head coach, respectively.

In May 2017, the Steel defeated the Sioux City Musketeers 2–1 in overtime of game five, finishing a 3-games-to-2 series win to claim the franchise's first Clark Cup. Head coach Dan Muse was hired by the National Hockey League's Nashville Predators as an assistant coach, and Mark Abalan took over as head coach. In January 2018, Abalan was replaced by Ryan Cruthers as interim head coach and assistant general manager. During the 2018 Clark Cup playoffs, the interim tag was removed and Cruthers was named the permanent head coach.

Cruthers left the team in May 2018, when the Steel hired Ryan Hardy as general manager. Greg Moore was hired as the head coach for the 2018–19 season. In 2019, Moore left to become head coach of the Toronto Marlies of the American Hockey League and Brock Sheahan was promoted to head coach.

The Steel won the regular season championship, the Anderson Cup, in the pandemic-shortened 2019–20 season. The Steel won a second Anderson Cup in the shortened 2020–21 season, and subsequently won their second Clark Cup as playoff champions.

In August 2023, Larry Robbins sold the team to the Wirtz Corporation, who also own the National Hockey League's Chicago Blackhawks franchise. Beginning in the 2026–27 season, the Steel play home games at USG Arena inside Blackhawks Ice Center, the practice facility for the Chicago Blackhawks in the Near West Side, Chicago.

== Notable alumni ==
- Nick Abruzzese
- Brendan Brisson
- Alex Cavallini
- Macklin Celebrini
- Jake Chelios
- Matt Clackson
- Matt Coronato
- Josh Doan
- Walker Duehr
- Jack Dugan
- Brandon Duhaime
- Adam Fantilli
- Dennis Gilbert
- Tom Gilbert
- Marc Johnstone
- Jackson Lacombe
- Tanner Laczynski
- Drew LeBlanc
- Mackenzie MacEachern
- Andrew Miller
- John Moore
- Travis Morin
- Cale Morris
- Jamie Oleksiak
- Owen Power
- Alec Regula
- Danny Richmond
- Wyatt Russell
- Philip Samuelsson
- Jaccob Slavin
- Josiah Slavin
- Lee Sweatt
- Daniel Vladař
- Reilly Walsh
