= De Lafontaine =

French ballet dancer

Mademoiselle De Lafontaine (1655–1738), also known as La Fontaine, was a French ballerina and is regarded as the first female professional ballet dancer. Her first name is unknown.

Together with Jean-Baptiste Lully and others, De Lafontaine participated in the development of opera ballet at the Paris Opéra under the auspices of Louis XIV. In 1681, she danced in the first performance that included women in a public ballet, in her debut as premiere danseuse in Le Triomphe de l'amour. Until that time, female parts in ballet had been danced by men. Although she was restrained by the long confining costumes, and the ballet techniques at that time were limited, La Fontaine's grace and charm were such that she came to be called the "queen of the dance". De Lafontaine went on to be the leading ballerina in at least 18 other productions at the Paris Opera between 1681 and 1693 including Persée, Amadis, Didon and Le Temple de la Paix. After dancing at the Opéra for about a decade, she retired to a convent.
