= 2021–22 Denver Pioneers men's ice hockey season =

Collegiate team season

NCAA Division I National Champion NCHC, co-champion NCAA Tournament, Champion
- Conference: T–1st NCHC
- Home ice: Magness Arena

Rankings
- USCHO: #1
- USA Today: #1

Record
- Overall: 31–9–1
- Conference: 18–6–0
- Home: 17–1–1
- Road: 10–7–0
- Neutral: 4–1–0

Coaches and captains
- Head coach: David Carle
- Assistant coaches: Tavis MacMillan; Dallas Ferguson; Corey Wogtech
- Captain: Cole Guttman
- Alternate captain(s): Ryan Barrow; Bobby Brink; Justin Lee

The 2021–22 Denver Pioneers men's ice hockey season was the 73rd season of play for the program. They represented the University of Denver in the 2021–22 NCAA Division I men's ice hockey season and for the 9th season in the National Collegiate Hockey Conference (NCHC). The Pioneers were coached by David Carle, in his fourth season, and played their home games at Magness Arena. The team won the 2022 NCAA Division I men's ice hockey tournament for their NCAA record-tying ninth national championship.

== Season ==
=== Alternating streaks ===
After a substandard year in 2021, Denver entered the year as a bit of a mystery, particularly with how unique the previous COVID-19-shortened season had been. The Pioneers returned with many of their top players, including starting goaltender Magnus Chrona, team captain Cole Guttman and top prospect Bobby Brink. The chief unknown, however, was how well the new crop of players would mesh with the team. Denver welcomed eight new players onto the team and while graduate transfer Cameron Wright was a known quantity, the Pioneers were also adding four young players drafted by NHL teams.

Early returns were good for Denver as the team shot out of the gate with four wins to open the season. In those matches the offense was overpowering, averaging 6 goals a night and pushing the Pioneers into the top-10 rankings. The once criticism at the time was that Denver had played relatively weak teams. That logic bore out when Denver followed up the quick success with four consecutive losses, all to ranked teams. During the losing streak, Denver's offense went quiet, being limited to just a single goal in three of the games. The mounting defeats also dropped the team down the rankings, and they were nearly out of the top-15 by early November. Each loss had come on the road and Denver's return to the Magness Arena coincided with the team getting back on track. Denver followed up their skid with a seven-game winning streak that included its first victories of the year against a ranked team. Critically, the defense was also able to settle down during the stretch and allowed more than 2 goals against on just one occasion.

=== Golden Chrona ===
After concluding the first half of the regular season with a loss to Minnesota Duluth, Denver returned to action with dominating performances against Alaska. Despite vastly outplaying the Nanooks, Denver only managed one win due to subpar performances from Chrona. The mediocre play seemed to drive the Swedish netminder to up his game and he reeled off three consecutive shutouts over the succeeding two weeks. While his performance did eventually cool off, Chrona remained stout in goal and helped Denver produce another long winning streak, this time posting nine victories in a row.

=== Brink leading the charge ===
Bobby Brink had gotten off to a decent start, with 21 points in his first 16 games, but it was after returning from the winter break that he got into his groove. From December 31 to February 19, Brink scored at least one point in every game and averaged two per game. He raced to the top of the scoring lead, taking Denver to the top of the national scoring totals with average of just over four and quarter goals per game for the year. While Brink was aided somewhat by the temporary absence of Nathan Smith due to trip to Beijing for the 2022 Winter Olympics, he nevertheless became just the second player in program history and the first in 40 years to lead the nation in scoring.

=== Young guns ===
While the Pioneers were led by their upper-classmen, four freshmen were making key contributions to the team's success. Carter Mazur and Massimo Rizzo were both clicking along at more than a point-per-game pace while Sean Behrens and Shai Buium aided an already impressive group on the blueline. Each of the four would eventually end up being named to the convergence All-Rookie Team the most ever for one program in a single year.

=== Bumps in the road ===
Denver ended the regular season with a few blemishes on its record. However, due to the difficulty of their schedule, the Pioneers didn't see any real drop to their rankings and were mathematically guaranteed to make the NCAA tournament before the season was over. The small rough patch allowed North Dakota to catch up to the Pioneers in the conference standings, however, Denver was able to keep in contact with the Hawks and earn a regular season co-championship. Since the Pioneers possessed the tie-breaker, Denver was able to open postseason play against the worst team in the conference, Miami. The 3rd-ranked Pioneers made easy work of the RedHawks, outshooting their opponents 82–47 and riding their power play to two comfortable wins.

When the team travelled north to the less-friendly Xcel Energy Center, the Pioneers saw their scoring dry up entirely. In a tremendous goaltending battle between Chrona and Ryan Fanti, Denver was shutout for the first time on the season and saw their hoped for a conference championship evaporate.

=== Championship run ===
Denver was one of four western teams to receive a #1 seed for the NCAA Tournament. Due to their campus' proximity to the West Regional in Loveland, Colorado, the Pioneers were the only top seed to play any tournament games close to home. Despite the advantage, the team got a tough fight from Massachusetts Lowell in the opening game. The River Hawks opened the scoring and used strong defensive play to keep the game tied well into the third period. After a penalty-filled sequence in the final frame, Denver was able to score twice and take the match 3–2. The regional final gave Denver an opportunity for revenge when it set them against Minnesota Duluth, who had knocked them out of the NCHC tournament. Similar to their prior meeting, the two teams were a match for one another early in the game and the Bulldogs managed to score first. When Cole Guttman tied the game a few minutes later, however, he ended Fanti's shutout streak that had begun more than three games earlier. The goal gave Denver the momentum entering the second but the Pioneers were unable to get another puck past the UMD netminder in the middle frame. The conference rivals remained knotted at 1-all well into the third period when the puck pin-balled around the Duluth cage before Carter Savoie was able to slip it into the cage for the eventual game-winner.

In the national semifinal, Denver met one of the championship favorites in Michigan who boasted no less than seven 1st-round draft picks. The high level of talent, however, did not stop the Pioneers from taking over the game for long stretches. The Pioneers played a nearly perfect game, outshooting the Wolverines 33–21 and not taking a single penalty in the match but were still unable to put any distance between the two teams. Denver twice took the lead in the match but Michigan tied the score on both occasions, forcing the two into overtime. 15 minutes into the extra session, the hero of the regional final, Carter Savoie, received a pass from Brink and potted the winner on his own rebound to send Denver to the championship game.

==== National Championship ====
The final game for the Pioneers came against the top team in the nation, Minnesota State. The Mavericks had been atop the national rankings since mid-January and were one of the top three teams nationally for both offense and defense. In the first two periods, Denver looked outmatched by the veteran lineup and were held scoreless on just 8 shots. Entering the third, the only glimmer of hope for the Pioneers was that they were down by just 1 goal and the team came out flying in the final frame. Ryan Barrow tied the game less than five minutes into the third period and he was soon followed by Michael Benning and Massimo Rizzo. The reversal of fortune was so sudden that Minnesota State seemed unable to get back to their game and the Pioneers carried the play for the remainder of the match. two empty-net goals sealed the game for Denver and the program skated away with its ninth national championship.

== Departures ==
| Player | Position | Nationality | Cause |
|---|---|---|---|
| Hank Crone | Forward | United States | Transferred to Northern Michigan |
| Slava Demin | Defenseman | United States | Transferred to Massachusetts |
| Jack Doremus | Forward | United States | Graduation (signed with Tulsa Oilers) |
| Jake Durflinger | Forward | United States | Graduate Transfer to Merrimack |
| Bo Hanson | Defenseman | United States | Graduate Transfer to Northern Michigan |
| Jaakko Heikkinen | Forward | Finland | Graduation (signed with KooKoo) |
| Steven Jandric | Forward | United States | Graduate Transfer to Merrimack |
| Corbin Kaczperski | Goaltender | United States | Graduation (signed with Vermilion County Bobcats) |
| Griffin Mendel | Defenseman | Canada | Graduate Transfer to Quinnipiac |
| Kohen Olischefski | Forward | Canada | Graduate Transfer to Providence |

== Recruiting ==
| Player | Position | Nationality | Age | Notes |
|---|---|---|---|---|
| Sean Behrens | Defenseman | United States | 18 | Barrington, IL; selected 61st overall in 2021 |
| Shai Buium | Defenseman | United States | 18 | San Diego, CA; selected 36th overall in 2021 |
| Matt Davis | Goaltender | Canada | 20 | Calgary, AB |
| Jack Devine | Forward | United States | 17 | Glencoe, IL |
| Carter Mazur | Forward | United States | 19 | Detroit, MI; selected 70th overall in 2021 |
| Owen Ozar | Forward | Canada | 21 | Prince Albert, SK |
| Massimo Rizzo | Forward | Canada | 20 | Burnaby, BC; selected 216th overall in 2019 |
| Cameron Wright | Forward | Canada | 23 | Richmond Hill, ON; graduate transfer from Bowling Green |

== Roster ==
As of August 12, 2021.

| No. | Nat. | Player | Class | Pos | Height | Weight | DoB | Hometown | Previous team | NHL rights |
|---|---|---|---|---|---|---|---|---|---|---|
| 2 | (United States) | Sean Behrens | Freshman | D | 5' 9" (1.75 m) | 176 lb (80 kg) | 2003-03-31 | Barrington, Illinois | USNTDP (USHL) | COL, 61st overall 2021 |
| 3 | (Finland) | Antti Tuomisto | Sophomore | D | 6' 5" (1.96 m) | 205 lb (93 kg) | 2001-01-20 | Pori, Finland | Ässät U20 (Nuorten SM-liiga) | DET, 35th overall 2019 |
| 4 | (United States) | Jack Devine | Freshman | F | 5' 10" (1.78 m) | 163 lb (74 kg) | 2003-10-02 | Glencoe, Illinois | USNTDP (USHL) | — |
| 6 | (United States) | McKade Webster | Sophomore | F | 5' 10" (1.78 m) | 170 lb (77 kg) | 2000-07-28 | St. Louis, Missouri | Green Bay Gamblers (USHL) | TBL, 213th overall 2019 |
| 7 | (Canada) | Brett Stapley | Senior | F | 5' 10" (1.78 m) | 177 lb (80 kg) | 1999-02-23 | Campbell River, British Columbia | Vernon Vipers (BCHL) | MTL, 190th overall 2018 |
| 8 | (Canada) | Carter Savoie | Sophomore | F | 5' 9" (1.75 m) | 190 lb (86 kg) | 2002-01-23 | St. Albert, Alberta | Sherwood Park Crusaders (AJHL) | EDM, 100th overall 2020 |
| 9 | (Canada) | Owen Ozar | Freshman | F | 5' 9" (1.75 m) | 156 lb (71 kg) | 2000-04-05 | Prince Albert, Saskatchewan | Waterloo Black Hawks (USHL) | — |
| 13 | (Canada) | Massimo Rizzo | Freshman | F | 5' 10" (1.78 m) | 176 lb (80 kg) | 2001-06-13 | Burnaby, British Columbia | Coquitlam Express (BCHL) | CAR, 216th overall 2019 |
| 15 | (Canada) | Carter King | Sophomore | F | 5' 10" (1.78 m) | 178 lb (81 kg) | 2001-08-30 | Calgary, Alberta | Surrey Eagles (BCHL) | — |
| 16 | (Canada) | Cameron Wright | Graduate | F | 6' 1" (1.85 m) | 189 lb (86 kg) | 1998-08-11 | Newmarket, Ontario | Bowling Green (WCHA) | — |
| 18 | (Canada) | Ryan Barrow (A) | Graduate | F | 6' 2" (1.88 m) | 184 lb (83 kg) | 1997-02-15 | Banff, Alberta | Langley Rivermen (BCHL) | — |
| 19 | (United States) | Cole Guttman (C) | Senior | F | 5' 9" (1.75 m) | 169 lb (77 kg) | 1999-04-06 | Los Angeles, California | Dubuque Fighting Saints (USHL) | TBL, 180th overall 2017 |
| 20 | (Canada) | Michael Benning | Sophomore | D | 5' 8" (1.73 m) | 178 lb (81 kg) | 2002-01-05 | St. Albert, Alberta | Sherwood Park Crusaders (AJHL) | FLA, 95th overall 2020 |
| 21 | (Canada) | Reid Irwin | Sophomore | D | 6' 1" (1.85 m) | 178 lb (81 kg) | 1999-03-01 | Victoria, British Columbia | Sherwood Park Crusaders (AJHL) | — |
| 22 | (United States) | Connor Caponi | Sophomore | F | 5' 9" (1.75 m) | 186 lb (84 kg) | 2000-03-20 | Nashville, Tennessee | Waterloo Black Hawks (USHL) | — |
| 23 | (United States) | Lane Krenzen | Junior | D | 5' 9" (1.75 m) | 183 lb (83 kg) | 1998-02-21 | Twig, Minnesota | Austin Bruins (NAHL) | — |
| 24 | (United States) | Bobby Brink (A) | Junior | F | 5' 9" (1.75 m) | 164 lb (74 kg) | 2001-07-08 | Minnetonka, Minnesota | Sioux City Musketeers (USHL) | PHI, 34th overall 2019 |
| 25 | (Canada) | Jack Works | Sophomore | F | 6' 0" (1.83 m) | 185 lb (84 kg) | 2001-05-23 | Yellowknife, Northwest Territories | Okotoks Oilers (AJHL) | — |
| 26 | (United States) | Shai Buium | Freshman | D | 6' 3" (1.91 m) | 217 lb (98 kg) | 2003-03-26 | San Diego, California | Sioux City Musketeers (USHL) | DET, 36th overall 2021 |
| 27 | (United States) | Kyle Mayhew | Senior | D | 5' 7" (1.7 m) | 156 lb (71 kg) | 1997-12-25 | Anaheim Hills, California | Fairbanks Ice Dogs (NAHL) | — |
| 28 | (Canada) | Brett Edwards | Junior | F | 5' 11" (1.8 m) | 190 lb (86 kg) | 1998-09-10 | Grande Prairie, Alberta | Drumheller Dragons (AJHL) | — |
| 30 | (Sweden) | Magnus Chrona | Junior | G | 6' 5" (1.96 m) | 207 lb (94 kg) | 2000-08-28 | Skellefteå, Sweden | Skellefteå J20 (J20 SuperElit) | SJS, 152nd overall 2018 |
| 31 | (United States) | Jack Caruso | Sophomore | G | 5' 9" (1.75 m) | 180 lb (82 kg) | 1999-06-07 | St. Louis, Missouri | Fairbanks Ice Dogs (NAHL) | — |
| 32 | (Canada) | Justin Lee (A) | Junior | D | 6' 0" (1.83 m) | 185 lb (84 kg) | 2000-03-14 | Waskada, Manitoba | Fargo Force (USHL) | — |
| 34 | (United States) | Carter Mazur | Freshman | D | 6' 0" (1.83 m) | 181 lb (82 kg) | 2002-03-28 | Jackson, Michigan | Tri-City Storm (USHL) | DET, 70th overall 2021 |
| 35 | (Canada) | Matt Davis | Freshman | G | 6' 0" (1.83 m) | 198 lb (90 kg) | 2001-06-16 | Calgary, Alberta | Green Bay Gamblers (USHL) | — |

== Standings ==
2021–22 National Collegiate Hockey Conference Standings
| | Conference record | | | | | | | | | | Overall record | | | | | |
| | GP | W | L | T | OTW | OTL | 3/SW | PTS | GF | GA | GP | W | L | T | GF | GA |
|---|---|---|---|---|---|---|---|---|---|---|---|---|---|---|---|---|
| #1 Denver † | 24 | 18 | 6 | 0 | 1 | 0 | 0 | 53 | 98 | 55 | 41 | 31 | 9 | 1 | 175 | 93 |
| #9 North Dakota † | 24 | 17 | 6 | 1 | 1 | 1 | 1 | 53 | 78 | 58 | 39 | 24 | 14 | 1 | 119 | 99 |
| #6 Western Michigan | 24 | 14 | 9 | 1 | 1 | 0 | 1 | 43 | 84 | 68 | 39 | 26 | 12 | 1 | 138 | 101 |
| #11 St. Cloud State | 24 | 10 | 10 | 4 | 1 | 2 | 1 | 36 | 84 | 69 | 37 | 18 | 15 | 4 | 133 | 97 |
| #5 Minnesota Duluth * | 24 | 10 | 10 | 4 | 1 | 1 | 2 | 36 | 61 | 56 | 42 | 22 | 16 | 4 | 109 | 93 |
| Omaha | 24 | 11 | 13 | 0 | 2 | 1 | 0 | 32 | 65 | 74 | 38 | 21 | 17 | 0 | 123 | 102 |
| Colorado College | 24 | 6 | 17 | 1 | 2 | 1 | 0 | 18 | 48 | 87 | 36 | 9 | 24 | 3 | 79 | 116 |
| Miami | 24 | 4 | 19 | 1 | 0 | 3 | 1 | 17 | 54 | 105 | 36 | 7 | 27 | 2 | 94 | 153 |
Championship: March 19, 2022 † indicates conference regular season champion (Penrose Cup) * indicates conference tournament champion (Frozen Faceoff Championship Trophy); Rankings: USCHO.com Top 20 Poll

== Schedule and results ==
| Date | Time | Opponent^{#} | Rank^{#} | Site | TV | Decision | Result | Attendance | Record |
Exhibition
| October 2 | 6:00 PM | Lindenwood* | #13 | Magness Arena • Denver, Colorado (Exhibition) | | | W 9–1 | | — |
Regular season
| October 8 | 7:07 PM | Arizona State* | #12 | Magness Arena • Denver, Colorado | | Chrona | W 8–3 | 4,554 | 1–0–0 |
| October 9 | 6:07 PM | Arizona State* | #12 | Magness Arena • Denver, Colorado | | Chrona | W 4–3 | 5,655 | 2–0–0 |
| October 15 | 7:05 PM | at Air Force* | #11 | Cadet Ice Arena • Colorado Springs, Colorado | | Chrona | W 4–1 | 2,623 | 3–0–0 |
| October 16 | 6:07 PM | Air Force* | #11 | Magness Arena • Denver, Colorado | | Davis | W 8–0 | 4,926 | 4–0–0 |
| October 22 | 5:00 PM | at #12 Providence* | #8 | Schneider Arena • Providence, Rhode Island | | Chrona | L 5–6 | 2,637 | 4–1–0 |
| October 23 | 5:00 PM | at #10 Boston College* | #8 | Conte Forum • Chestnut Hill, Massachusetts | NESN | Davis | L 1–5 | 4,546 | 4–2–0 |
| November 5 | 6:07 PM | at #8 North Dakota | #11 | Ralph Engelstad Arena • Grand Forks, North Dakota | | Chrona | L 1–3 | 11,058 | 4–3–0 (0–1–0) |
| November 6 | 5:05 PM | at #8 North Dakota | #11 | Ralph Engelstad Arena • Grand Forks, North Dakota | | Chrona | L 1–4 | 11,337 | 4–4–0 (0–2–0) |
| November 12 | 7:07 PM | #9 Western Michigan | #14 | Magness Arena • Denver, Colorado | | Chrona | W 5–3 | 4,540 | 5–4–0 (1–2–0) |
| November 13 | 7:07 PM | #9 Western Michigan | #14 | Magness Arena • Denver, Colorado | | Chrona | W 5–2 | 4,981 | 6–4–0 (2–2–0) |
| November 19 | 7:07 PM | Miami | #11 | Magness Arena • Denver, Colorado | | Chrona | W 4–1 | 4,882 | 7–4–0 (3–2–0) |
| November 20 | 6:07 PM | Miami | #11 | Magness Arena • Denver, Colorado | | Chrona | W 7–1 | 4,916 | 8–4–0 (4–2–0) |
| December 3 | 7:05 PM | at Arizona State* | #12 | Oceanside Ice Arena • Tempe, Arizona | | Chrona | W 6–2 | 891 | 9–4–0 |
| December 4 | 7:05 PM | at Arizona State* | #12 | Oceanside Ice Arena • Tempe, Arizona | | Chrona | W 7–1 | 911 | 10–4–0 |
| December 10 | 6:07 PM | at #5 Minnesota Duluth | #11 | AMSOIL Arena • Duluth, Minnesota | | Chrona | W 5–0 | 5,492 | 11–4–0 (5–2–0) |
| December 11 | 6:07 PM | at #5 Minnesota Duluth | #11 | AMSOIL Arena • Duluth, Minnesota | | Chrona | L 2–6 | 5,558 | 11–5–0 (5–3–0) |
| December 31 | 7:07 PM | Alaska* | #8 | Magness Arena • Denver, Colorado | | Chrona | W 7–2 | 4,176 | 12–5–0 |
| January 1 | 6:07 PM | Alaska* | #8 | Magness Arena • Denver, Colorado | Altitude 2 | Chrona | T 4–4 ^{OT} | 5,260 | 12–5–1 |
| January 15 | 6:00 PM | #15 Omaha | #6 | Magness Arena • Denver, Colorado | | Chrona | W 5–2 | 5,197 | 13–5–1 (6–3–0) |
| January 16 | 6:00 PM | #15 Omaha | #6 | Magness Arena • Denver, Colorado | | Chrona | W 4–0 | 4,208 | 14–5–1 (7–3–0) |
| January 21 | 7:07 PM | Colorado College | #5 | Magness Arena • Denver, Colorado (Battle for the Gold Pan) | CBSN | Chrona | W 5–0 | 5,662 | 15–5–1 (8–3–0) |
| January 22 | 6:07 PM | at Colorado College | #5 | Ed Robson Arena • Colorado Springs, Colorado | ATTRM | Chrona | W 4–0 | 3,588 | 16–5–1 (9–3–0) |
| January 28 | 5:05 PM | at Miami | #5 | Steve Cady Arena • Oxford, Ohio | | Chrona | W 5–4 ^{OT} | 2,204 | 17–5–1 (10–3–0) |
| January 29 | 3:05 PM | at Miami | #5 | Steve Cady Arena • Oxford, Ohio | | Chrona | W 4–2 | 2,682 | 18–5–1 (11–3–0) |
| February 4 | 7:00 PM | #7 St. Cloud State | #4 | Magness Arena • Denver, Colorado | | Chrona | W 8–5 | 4,661 | 19–5–1 (12–3–0) |
| February 5 | 6:00 PM | #7 St. Cloud State | #4 | Magness Arena • Denver, Colorado | | Chrona | W 2–0 | 5,375 | 20–5–1 (13–3–0) |
| February 11 | 7:00 PM | #6 Minnesota Duluth | #3 | Magness Arena • Denver, Colorado | | Chrona | W 5–3 | 5,572 | 21–5–1 (14–3–0) |
| February 12 | 6:00 PM | #6 Minnesota Duluth | #3 | Magness Arena • Denver, Colorado | | Chrona | L 2–3 | 5,984 | 21–6–1 (14–4–0) |
| February 18 | 5:00 PM | at #6 Western Michigan | #3 | Lawson Arena • Kalamazoo, Michigan | | Chrona | W 4–1 | 3,593 | 22–6–1 (15–4–0) |
| February 19 | 5:00 PM | at #6 Western Michigan | #3 | Lawson Arena • Kalamazoo, Michigan | | Chrona | L 4–6 | 3,606 | 22–7–1 (15–5–0) |
| February 25 | 6:00 PM | at Omaha | #3 | Baxter Arena • Omaha, Nebraska | CBSSN | Chrona | L 1–5 | 5,215 | 22–8–1 (15–6–0) |
| February 26 | 6:00 PM | at Omaha | #3 | Baxter Arena • Omaha, Nebraska | | Davis | W 5–2 | 5,630 | 23–8–1 (16–6–0) |
| March 4 | 7:30 PM | at Colorado College | #3 | Ed Robson Arena • Colorado Springs, Colorado (Rivalry) | ATTRM | Chrona | W 5–0 | 3,891 | 24–8–1 (17–6–0) |
| March 5 | 7:00 PM | Colorado College | #3 | Magness Arena • Denver, Colorado (Rivalry) | | Davis | W 5–2 | 6,321 | 25–8–1 (18–6–0) |
NCHC Tournament
| March 11 | 7:07 PM | Miami* | #3 | Magness Arena • Denver, Colorado (Quarterfinal Game 1) | | Chrona | W 5–2 | 4,255 | 26–8–1 |
| March 12 | 6:07 PM | Miami* | #3 | Magness Arena • Denver, Colorado (Quarterfinal Game 2) | | Chrona | W 5–1 | 5,210 | 27–8–1 |
| March 18 | 3:07 PM | vs. #8 Minnesota Duluth* | #3 | Xcel Energy Center • Saint Paul, Minnesota (Semifinal) | CBSSN | Chrona | L 0–2 | 10,253 | 27–9–1 |
NCAA Tournament
| March 24 | 7:00 PM | vs. #13 Massachusetts Lowell* | #3 | Budweiser Events Center • Loveland, Colorado (West Regional Semifinal) | ESPNU | Chrona | W 3–2 | 3,138 | 28–9–1 |
| March 26 | 2:00 PM | vs. #6 Minnesota Duluth* | #3 | Budweiser Events Center • Loveland, Colorado (West Regional Final) | ESPNU | Chrona | W 2–1 | 4,487 | 29–9–1 |
| April 7 | 5:00 PM | vs. #2 Michigan* | #3 | TD Garden • Boston, Massachusetts (National Semifinals) | ESPN2 | Chrona | W 3–2 ^{OT} | 17,850 | 30–9–1 |
| April 9 | 6:00 PM | vs. #1 Minnesota State* | #3 | TD Garden • Boston, Massachusetts (National Championship) | ESPN2 | Chrona | W 5–1 | 17,850 | 31–9–1 |
*Non-conference game. ^{#}Rankings from USCHO.com Poll. All times are in Mountain Time. Source:

== 2022 national championship ==
=== (E1) Minnesota State vs. (W1) Denver ===
| April 9, 2022; 8:00 PM | (E1) Minnesota State | 1–5 (1–0, 0–0, 0–5) | (W1) Denver | TD Garden; Attendance: 17,850 |

Game reference
| Referees: Geno Binda Jr. Jeremy Tufts; Linesmen: Bill Kingdon; Kevin Briganti |

Scoring summary
| Period | Team | Goal | Assist(s) | Time | Score |
|---|---|---|---|---|---|
| 1st | MSU | Sam Morton (9) – PP | Sowder and Sandelin | 13:59 | 1–0 MSU |
| 2nd | None | | | | |
| 3rd | DEN | Ryan Barrow (8) | Benning and Devine | 44:46 | 1–1 |
| 3rd | DEN | Michael Benning (15) – GW | Buium and Wright | 47:33 | 2–1 DEN |
| 3rd | DEN | Massimo Rizzo (12) | Mazur and Lee | 53:34 | 3–1 DEN |
| 3rd | DEN | Brett Stapley (18) – EN | unassisted | 57:28 | 4–1 DEN |
| 3rd | DEN | Cameron Wright (23) – EN | Mazur | 58:00 | 5–1 DEN |
Penalty summary
| Period | Team | Player | Penalty | Time | PIM |
| 1st | DEN | Michael Benning | Tripping | 12:23 | 2:00 |
| 1st | MSU | Nathan Smith | Roughing | 15:28 | 2:00 |
| 2nd | MSU | Bench | Too Many Men | 27:07 | 2:00 |
| 3rd | MSU | Sam Morton | Tripping | 45:26 | 2:00 |

Shots by period
| Team | 1 | 2 | 3 | T |
|---|---|---|---|---|
| Denver | 3 | 5 | 12 | 20 |
| Minnesota State | 8 | 10 | 10 | 28 |

Goaltenders
| Team | Name | Saves | Goals against | Time on ice |
|---|---|---|---|---|
| DEN | Magnus Chrona | 27 | 1 | 60:00 |
| MSU | Dryden McKay | 15 | 3 | 58:22 |

== Scoring statistics ==
| Name | Position | Games | Goals | Assists | Points | PIM |
|---|---|---|---|---|---|---|
| Bobby Brink | RW | 41 | 14 | 43 | 57 | 44 |
| Carter Savoie | LW | 39 | 23 | 22 | 45 | 37 |
| Cole Guttman | C | 41 | 19 | 26 | 45 | 26 |
| Brett Stapley | C | 41 | 18 | 25 | 43 | 54 |
| Michael Benning | D | 41 | 15 | 23 | 38 | 14 |
| Carter Mazur | LW | 41 | 14 | 24 | 38 | 44 |
| Massimo Rizzo | C | 39 | 12 | 24 | 36 | 48 |
| Cameron Wright | LW | 41 | 23 | 11 | 34 | 12 |
| Sean Behrens | D | 37 | 3 | 26 | 29 | 12 |
| Ryan Barrow | F | 41 | 8 | 13 | 21 | 12 |
| Jack Devine | RW | 36 | 3 | 16 | 19 | 16 |
| Shai Buium | D | 39 | 3 | 15 | 18 | 12 |
| Justin Lee | D | 38 | 3 | 13 | 16 | 30 |
| McKade Webster | LW | 39 | 6 | 8 | 14 | 19 |
| Carter King | F | 36 | 3 | 8 | 11 | 2 |
| Kyle Mayhew | D | 40 | 2 | 9 | 11 | 19 |
| Antti Tuomisto | D | 35 | 1 | 8 | 9 | 21 |
| Connor Caponi | F | 36 | 4 | 1 | 5 | 37 |
| Reid Irwin | C/D | 20 | 1 | 1 | 2 | 15 |
| Lane Krenzen | D | 4 | 0 | 1 | 1 | 4 |
| Owen Ozar | F | 21 | 0 | 1 | 1 | 6 |
| Jack Caruso | G | 1 | 0 | 0 | 0 | 0 |
| Matt Davis | G | 6 | 0 | 0 | 0 | 0 |
| Jack Works | F | 10 | 0 | 0 | 0 | 0 |
| Brett Edwards | F | 21 | 0 | 0 | 0 | 0 |
| Magnus Chrona | G | 37 | 0 | 0 | 0 | 0 |
| Total | | | 175 | 318 | 493 | 500 |

== Goaltending statistics ==
| Name | Games | Minutes | Wins | Losses | Ties | Goals against | Saves | Shut outs | SV % | GAA |
|---|---|---|---|---|---|---|---|---|---|---|
| Matt Davis | 6 | 275 | 3 | 1 | 0 | 9 | 108 | 1 | .923 | 1.96 |
| Magnus Chrona | 37 | 2187 | 28 | 8 | 1 | 77 | 785 | 6 | .911 | 2.11 |
| Empty Net | - | 21 | - | - | - | 7 | - | - | - | - |
| Total | 41 | 2483 | 31 | 9 | 1 | 93 | 893 | 7 | .906 | 2.25 |

== Rankings ==
| Poll | Week | | | | | | | | | | | | | | | | | | | | | | | | | |
| Poll | Pre | 1 | 2 | 3 | 4 | 5 | 6 | 7 | 8 | 9 | 10 | 11 | 12 | 13 | 14 | 15 | 16 | 17 | 18 | 19 | 20 | 21 | 22 | 23 | 24 | 25 (Final) |
|---|---|---|---|---|---|---|---|---|---|---|---|---|---|---|---|---|---|---|---|---|---|---|---|---|---|---|
| USCHO.com | 13 (1) | 12 (1) | 11 (1) | 8 (1) | 11 | 11 | 14 | 11 | 12 | 12 | 11 | 8 | 7 | 6 | 5 (1) | 5 (1) | 4 (1) | 3 (4) | 3 (2) | 3 (2) | 3 | 3 (1) | 3 (1) | 3 | - | 1 (50) |
| USA Today | NR | 13 | 11 | 8 | 12 | 13 | NR | 12 | 11 | 11 | 10 | 8 | 6 (1) | 6 (1) | 6 (2) | 5 (2) | 3 (3) | 3 (3) | 3 (1) | 3 (1) | 3 | 3 (3) | 2 (4) | 4 | 3 (5) | 1 (34) |

Note: USCHO did not release a poll in week 24.

== Awards and honors ==
| Player | Award | Ref |
|---|---|---|
| Michael Benning | NCAA Tournament Most Outstanding Player | |
| Bobby Brink | AHCA West First Team All-American | |
| Bobby Brink | NCHC Player of the Year | |
| Carter Mazur | NCHC Rookie of the Year | |
| Bobby Brink | NCHC Forward of the Year | |
| Magnus Chrona | Three Stars Award | |
| Bobby Brink | NCHC First Team | |
| Michael Benning | NCHC Second Team | |
| Carter Savoie | NCHC Second Team | |
| Sean Behrens | NCHC Rookie Team | |
| Shai Buium | NCHC Rookie Team | |
| Carter Mazur | NCHC Rookie Team | |
| Massimo Rizzo | NCHC Rookie Team | |
| Magnus Chrona | NCAA All-Tournament Team | |
| Michael Benning | NCAA All-Tournament Team | |
| Carter Savoie | NCAA All-Tournament Team | |
| Ryan Barrow | NCAA All-Tournament Team | |

== Players drafted into the NHL ==
=== 2022 NHL entry draft ===
| Round | Pick | Player | NHL team |
|---|---|---|---|
| 2 | 56 | Rieger Lorenz^{†} | Minnesota Wild |
| 3 | 67 | Miko Mitikka^{†} | Arizona Coyotes |
| 3 | 90 | Aidan Thompson^{†} | Chicago Blackhawks |
| 4 | 99 | Garrett Brown^{†} | Winnipeg Jets |
| 7 | 221 | Jack Devine | Florida Panthers |

† incoming freshman
