= 2022 NCHC Tournament =

2022 NCHC Men's ice hockey tournament
- Dates: March 11–19, 2022
- Teams: 8
- Finals site: Xcel Energy Center; Saint Paul, Minnesota
- Champions: Minnesota Duluth (3rd title)
- Winning coach: Scott Sandelin (3rd title)
- MVP: Ryan Fanti (Minnesota Duluth)
- NCHC Men's Ice Hockey Tournaments

The 2022 NCHC Tournament was the eighth tournament in league history. It was played between March 11 and 19, 2022. Quarterfinal games were played at home team campus sites, while the final four matches were held at the Xcel Energy Center in Saint Paul, Minnesota. As the tournament winner, Minnesota Duluth earned the NCHC's automatic bid to the 2022 NCAA Division I Men's Ice Hockey Tournament.

== Format ==
The first round of the postseason tournament featured a best-of-three games format. All eight conference teams participated in the tournament. Teams were seeded No. 1 through No. 8 according to their final conference standing, with a tiebreaker system used to seed teams with an identical number of points accumulated. The top four seeded teams each earn home ice and host one of the lower seeded teams.

The winners of the first round series advanced to the Xcel Energy Center for the NCHC Frozen Faceoff. The Frozen Faceoff used a single-elimination format. Teams were re-seeded No. 1 through No. 4 according to the final regular season conference standings.

=== Standings ===
2021–22 National Collegiate Hockey Conference Standings
	Conference record										Overall record					
	GP	W	L	T	OTW	OTL	3/SW	PTS	GF	GA	GP	W	L	T	GF	GA
#1 Denver †	24	18	6	0	1	0	0	53	98	55	41	31	9	1	175	93
#9 North Dakota †	24	17	6	1	1	1	1	53	78	58	39	24	14	1	119	99
#6 Western Michigan	24	14	9	1	1	0	1	43	84	68	39	26	12	1	138	101
#11 St. Cloud State	24	10	10	4	1	2	1	36	84	69	37	18	15	4	133	97
#5 Minnesota Duluth *	24	10	10	4	1	1	2	36	61	56	42	22	16	4	109	93
Omaha	24	11	13	0	2	1	0	32	65	74	38	21	17	0	123	102
Colorado College	24	6	17	1	2	1	0	18	48	87	36	9	24	3	79	116
Miami	24	4	19	1	0	3	1	17	54	105	36	7	27	2	94	153
Championship: March 19, 2022 † indicates conference regular season champion (Penrose Cup) * indicates conference tournament champion (Frozen Faceoff Championship Trophy); Rankings: USCHO.com Top 20 Poll

== Bracket ==
Teams are reseeded for the Semifinals

Quarterfinals; March 11–13
1	Denver	5	5	-
8	Miami	2	1	-
2	North Dakota	2	2	-
7	Colorado College	1	1	-
(Pairings are reseeded after the first round)
3	Western Michigan	4	5*	-
6	Omaha	2	4	-
4	St. Cloud State	2	3	-
5	Minnesota Duluth	5	4*	-

Semifinals; March 18
1	Denver	0
5	Minnesota Duluth	2
2	North Dakota	2
3	Western Michigan	4

Championship; March 19
5	Minnesota Duluth	3
3	Western Michigan	0

* denotes overtime periods

== Results ==
=== Quarterfinals ===
==== (1) Denver vs. (8) Miami ====
March 11, 2022; 7:07 PM	Denver	5 – 2 (1–1, 2–0, 2–1)	Miami	Magness Arena; Attendance: 4,255

Game reference

Magnus Chrona
Goalies
Ludvig Persson
Referees:
Mike Sheehan
Sterling Egan
Linesmen:
John Grandt
Erik Contino

	0–1	03:19 – PP – Chase Pletzke (7) (Savage, Gresock)
(Brink, Benning) Cole Guttman (16) – PP – 07:25	1–1
(Wright, Webster) Jack Devine (3) – 22:05	2–1
(Lee, Mazur) McKade Webster (6) – GW – 22:36	3–1
(Rizzo, Benning) Brett Stapley (15) – PP – 47:37	4–1
	4–2	51:11 – Chase Gresock (9) (Capstick, Barry)
(Stapley) Shai Buium (3) – EN – 59:07	5–2

18 min
Penalties
20 min
38
Shots
22

March 12, 2022; 6:07 PM	Denver	5 – 1 (1–0, 2–0, 2–1)	Miami	Magness Arena; Attendance: 5,210

Game reference

Magnus Chrona
Goalies
Ludvig Persson
Referees:
Mike Sheehan
Sterling Egan
Linesmen:
John Grandt
Erik Contino

(Guttman, Savoie) Mike Benning (14) – 09:16	1–0
(Mazur, Buium) Massimo Rizzo (11) – GW – 21:11	2–0
(Brink, Savoie) Cole Guttman (17) – PP – 24:36	3–0
(Guttman, Benning) Carter Mazur (14) – PP – 51:05	4–0
	4–1	54:34 – Derek Daschke (9) (Fletcher, Clement)
(Barrow, Behrens) Cole Guttman (18) – SH – 55:47	5–1

19 min
Penalties
24 min
44
Shots
25

Denver Won Series 2–0

==== (2) North Dakota vs. (7) Colorado College ====
March 11, 2022; 7:07 PM	North Dakota	2 – 1 (0–0, 2–1, 0–0)	Colorado College	Ralph Engelstad Arena; Attendance: 10,475

Game reference

Zach Driscoll
Goalies
Matt Vernon
Referees:
Brandon Schmitt
Timm Walsh
Linesmen:
Justin Hills
Tyler Liffrig

(Caulfield, Schmaltz) Jake Sanderson (8) – 22:25	1–0
	1–1	23:37 – Jordan Biro (6) (Cooley, McKown)
(Jandric, Schmaltz) Tyler Kleven (7) – GW – 32:54	2–1

2 min
Penalties
2 min
23
Shots
16

March 12, 2022; 6:07 PM	North Dakota	2 – 1 (0–0, 2–1, 0–0)	Colorado College	Ralph Engelstad Arena; Attendance: 10,095

Game reference

Zach Driscoll
Goalies
Matt Vernon
Referees:
Brandon Schmitt
Timm Walsh
Linesmen:
Justin Hills
Tyler Liffrig

(Albrecht, Moore) Matteo Costantini (8) – 21:28	1–0
	1–1	23:10 – PP – Stanley Cooley (6) (Andrews, Gleason)
(Sanderson, Caulfield) Riese Gaber (15) – GW PP – 34:57	2–1

19 min
Penalties
8 min
22
Shots
30

North Dakota Won Series 2–0

==== (3) Western Michigan vs. (6) Omaha ====
March 11, 2022; 7:05 PM	Western Michigan	4 – 2 (1–2, 0–0, 3–0)	Omaha	Lawson Arena; Attendance: 3,107

Game reference

Brandon Bussi
Goalies
Isaiah Saville
Referees:
Nick Krebsbach
Joe Sullivan
Linesmen:
Dan Cohen
Eric Frank

(Hillebrand, Passolt) Luke Grainger (5) – 03:45	1–0
	1–1	16:08 – PP – Matt Miller (10) (Berg)
	1–2	18:01 – Taylor Ward (19) (Primeau, McManus)
(Passolt) Luke Grainger (6) – 47:57	2–2
(Glover, Fulp) Luke Grainger (7) – GW – 55:38	3–2
(Gallant, Bussi) Ethen Frank (26) – 58:36	4–2

6 min
Penalties
8 min
28
Shots
31

March 12, 2022; 7:05 PM	Western Michigan	5 – 4 (OT) (1–2, 3–1, 0–1, 1–0)	Omaha	Lawson Arena; Attendance: 3,669

Game reference

Brandon Bussi
Goalies
Isaiah Saville
Referees:
Nick Krebsbach
Joe Sullivan
Linesmen:
Dan Cohen
Eric Frank

	0–1	10:05 – PP – Kevin Conley (10) (Tychonick, Weiss)
(Passolt, Attard) Max Sasson (8) – PP – 16:17	1–1
	1–2	17:36 – PP – Jonny Tychonick (2) (Conley, Weiss)
	1–3	24:48 – Nolan Sullivan (19) (Bremer, Knoepke)
(Sasson, Glover) Jason Polin (16) – 33:20	2–3
(Glover, Fulp) Ronnie Attard (13) – 33:54	3–3
(Attard, Frank) Drew Worrad (8) – 38:07	4–3
	4–4	50:47 – Jack Randl (9) (Miller)
(Frank) Drew Worrad (9) – GW – 64:42	5–4

6 min
Penalties
6 min
34
Shots
22

Western Michigan Won Series 2–0

==== (4) St. Cloud State vs. (5) Minnesota Duluth ====
March 11, 2022; 7:07 PM	St. Cloud State	2 – 5 (1–1, 1–4, 0–0)	Minnesota Duluth	Herb Brooks National Hockey Center; Attendance: 2,594

Game reference

Jaxon Castor
Goalies
Ryan Fanti
Referees:
Ryan Hersey
Dan Dreger
Linesmen:
Jeff Schultz
Dana Penkivech

	0–1	14:07 – Noah Cates (5) (Bender, Gallatin)
(Miller, Peart) Kevin Fitzgerald (17) – 19:22	1–1
(Perbix, Brodzinski) Nolan Walker (9) – PP – 21:36	2–1
	2–2	29:09 – Koby Bender (5) (Gotz, Gallatin)
	2–3	29:39 – GW PP – Koby Bender (6) (Cates, Kaiser)
	2–4	36:44 – Koby Bender (7) (Cates)
	2–5	37:18 – Blake Biondi (16) (James, Olson)

11 min
Penalties
8 min
23
Shots
38

March 12, 2022; 6:07 PM	St. Cloud State	3 – 4 (OT) (1–0, 1–0, 1–3, 0–1)	Minnesota Duluth	Herb Brooks National Hockey Center; Attendance: 3,227

Game reference

Jaxon Castor
Goalies
Ryan Fanti
Referees:
Ryan Hersey
Dan Dreger
Linesmen:
Jeff Schultz
Dana Penkivech

(Okabe, Trejbal) Nick Perbix (17) – 05:09	1–0
(Okabe, Bushy) Jami Krannila (15) – 21:38	2–0
	2–1	40:56 – PP – Noah Cates (10) (Bender, Kaiser)
	2–2	43:30 – PP – Dominic James (5) (Biondi, Kelley)
(Kupka, Trejbal) Nick Perbix (6) – 43:41	3–2
	3–3	57:03 – Tanner Laderoute (10) (Anderson, Jacques)
	3–4	70:58 – GW – Noah Cates (11) (Roth, Gilling)

6 min
Penalties
10 min
41
Shots
41

Minnesota Duluth Won Series 2–0

=== Semifinals ===
==== (1) Denver vs. (5) Minnesota Duluth ====
March 18, 2022; 4:00 PM	Denver	0 – 2 (0-1, 0–0, 0-1)	Minnesota Duluth	Xcel Energy Center; Attendance: 10,253

Game reference
Magnus Chrona	Goalies	Ryan Fanti	Referees: Nathan Wieler; Joe Sullivan; Linesmen: Justin Hills; Erik Contino
0–1 / 14:47 – GW – Blake Biondi (17) (Jacques); 0–2 / 59:40 – EN – Kobe Roth (16) (unassisted)			Referees: Nathan Wieler; Joe Sullivan; Linesmen: Justin Hills; Erik Contino
6 min	Penalties	8 min	Referees: Nathan Wieler; Joe Sullivan; Linesmen: Justin Hills; Erik Contino
30	Shots	31	Referees: Nathan Wieler; Joe Sullivan; Linesmen: Justin Hills; Erik Contino

==== (2) North Dakota vs. (3) Western Michigan ====
March 18, 2022; 7:30 PM	North Dakota	2 – 4 (1–1, 1-2, 0-1)	Western Michigan	Xcel Energy Center; Attendance: 10,253

Game reference

Zach Driscoll
Goalies
Brandon Bussi
Referees:
Timm Walsh
Dan Dreger
Linesmen:
Jeff Schultz
Dana Penkivech

(Gaber, Ford) Judd Caulfield (11) – 11:45	1–0
	1–1	13:38 – Ty Glover (7) (Sasson, Attard)
	1–2	33:34 – PP – Ty Glover (8) (Joyaux, Worrad)
	1–3	39:29 – GW – Hugh Larkin (3) (Worrad)
(Senden) Nick Portz (2) – 39:53	2–3
	2–4	58:27 – EN – Max Sasson (6) (unassisted)

11 min
Penalties
12 min
23
Shots
26

=== Championship ===
==== (3) Western Michigan vs. (5) Minnesota Duluth ====
March 19, 2022; 7:30 PM	Western Michigan	0 - 3 (0-1, 0-1, 0-1)	Minnesota Duluth	Xcel Energy Center; Attendance: 7,814

Game reference

Brandon Bussi
Goalies
Ryan Fanti
Referees:
Nick Krebsbach
Ryan Hersey
Linesmen:
John Grandt
Tyler Liffrig

0-1	05:26 - GW - Dominic James (6) (unassisted)
0-2	25:59 - PP - Casey Gilling (8) (Kaiser, Bender)
0-3	49:12 - Wyatt Kaiser (2) (unassisted)

6 min
Penalties
6 min
19
Shots
25

== Tournament awards ==
=== Frozen Faceoff All-Tournament Team ===
- F: Blake Biondi (Minnesota Duluth)
- F: Ty Glover (Western Michigan)
- F: Dominic James (Minnesota Duluth)
- D: Ronnie Attard (Western Michigan)
- D: Wyatt Kaiser (Minnesota Duluth)
- G: Ryan Fanti* (Minnesota Duluth)

* Most Valuable Player(s)
