= 2021–22 Omaha Mavericks men's ice hockey season =

- Conference: 6th NCHC
- Home ice: Baxter Arena

Rankings
- USCHO.com: NR
- USA Today: NR

Record
- Overall: 21–17–0
- Conference: 11–13–0
- Home: 14–6–0
- Road: 7–11–0

Coaches and captains
- Head coach: Mike Gabinet
- Assistant coaches: Dave Noël-Bernier; Paul Jerrard
- Captain: Kevin Conley
- Alternate captain(s): Nate Knoepke; Nolan Sullivan; Taylor Ward

The 2021–22 Omaha Mavericks men's ice hockey season was the 25th season of play for the program. They represented the University of Nebraska Omaha in the 2021–22 NCAA Division I men's ice hockey season and for the 9th season in the National Collegiate Hockey Conference (NCHC). The Mavericks were coached by Mike Gabinet, in his fifth season, and played their home games at Baxter Arena.

== Season ==
Omaha began its season with a tremendous run, winning seven consecutive games during the month of October. The extended winning streak vaulted the Mavericks into a top-10 ranking but it did come with a caveat. All of their early-season matches came against relatively weak non-conference opponents and wouldn't provide much assistance in the team's bid for an NCAA appearance. That didn't seem like much of a problem when Omaha earned a road split with top-ranked St. Cloud State, but the Mavericks didn't help themselves with inconsistent performances against the two worst teams in the NCHC.

After returning from the winter break, Omaha continued their up-and-down play with a split against unranked St. Lawrence that put them in the final potential at-large position. They were forced to postpone their series the following week due to COVID-19 but suffered a greater loss when they were swept by Denver afterwards.

Omaha was unable to arrest its downward slide for a while, splitting three consecutive weekends and then bottoming out with a sweep at the hands of Miami in mid-February. The losses to the RedHawks knocked Omaha out of the polls entirely and made it all but impossible for the team to make the NCAA tournament without a conference championship. While the team finished strong in the final three weeks, Omaha sat mired in 6th place with a losing conference record.

Isaiah Saville remained in goal for the Mavericks as they began postseason play. Omaha managed to gain a lead in the first game and were ahead at the start of the third, however, they were facing one of the top offenses in the country in Western Michigan and the Broncos stormed back with a 3-goal third period to take the match. The second game had a similar pattern with Omaha gaining a 3–1 lead mid-way through the contest, only to see their advantage erased with WMU netted three goals in less than 5 minutes. The Mavs were able to tie the game in the third period but could not get the game-winner and ultimately fell in overtime.

== Departures ==
Player	Position	Nationality	Cause
Josh Boyer	Forward	United States	Transferred to St. Lawrence
Ryan Brushett	Forward	Canada	Transferred to Massachusetts–Lowell
Jordan Klehr	Defenseman	United States	Graduation (retired)
Travis Kothenbeutel	Forward	United States	Left program (retired)
Alexandre Roy	Defenseman	Canada	Transferred to Niagara
John Schuldt	Defenseman	United States	Transferred to St. Thomas

== Recruiting ==
Player	Position	Nationality	Age	Notes
Cameron Berg	Forward	United States	19	West Fargo, ND; selected 125th overall in 2021
Victor Mancini	Defenseman	United States	19	Saginaw, MI
Brannon McManus	Forward	United States	22	Newport Beach, CA; graduate transfer from Minnesota
Ty Mueller	Forward	Canada	18	Cochrane, AB
Davis Pennington	Defenseman	United States	20	Saline, MI

== Roster ==
As of September 9, 2021.

No.	Nat.	Player	Class	Pos	Height	Weight	DoB	Hometown	Previous team	NHL rights
2	(United States)	Jason Smallidge	Senior	D	6' 2" (1.88 m)	193 lb (88 kg)	1998-05-20	Eagan, Minnesota	Youngstown Phantoms (USHL)	—
3	(Canada)	Kirby Proctor	Junior	D	6' 3" (1.91 m)	197 lb (89 kg)	2001-04-20	Okotoks, Alberta	Des Moines Buccaneers (USHL)	—
4	(Canada)	Brandon Scanlin	Junior	D	6' 4" (1.93 m)	213 lb (97 kg)	1999-06-02	Hamilton, Ontario	Brooks Bandits (AJHL)	—
7	(United States)	Nate Knoepke (A)	Graduate	D	6' 3" (1.91 m)	205 lb (93 kg)	1999-04-08	Farmington, Minnesota	Sioux City Musketeers (USHL)	—
10	(United States)	Kevin Conley (C)	Graduate	F	6' 0" (1.83 m)	191 lb (87 kg)	1997-02-17	Wausau, Wisconsin	Sioux Falls Stampede (USHL)	—
11	(United States)	Nolan Sullivan (A)	Junior	F	5' 11" (1.8 m)	203 lb (92 kg)	1999-05-21	Eden Prairie, Minnesota	Muskegon Lumberjacks (USHL)	—
12	(United States)	Nolan Krenzen	Sophomore	D	5' 9" (1.75 m)	180 lb (82 kg)	2001-07-13	Duluth, Minnesota	Omaha Lancers (USHL)	—
13	(United States)	Chayse Primeau	Senior	F	6' 3" (1.91 m)	185 lb (84 kg)	1997-09-15	Margate City, New Jersey	Dubuque Fighting Saints (USHL)	—
14	(United States)	Cameron Berg	Freshman	F	6' 0" (1.83 m)	195 lb (88 kg)	2002-01-29	White Bear Lake, Minnesota	Muskegon Lumberjacks (USHL)	NYI, 125th overall 2021
16	(Sweden)	Martin Sundberg	Graduate	F	6' 4" (1.93 m)	197 lb (89 kg)	1996-12-04	Linköping, Sweden	Fargo Force (USHL)	—
17	(Canada)	Taylor Ward (A)	Senior	F	6' 2" (1.88 m)	207 lb (94 kg)	1998-03-31	Kelowna, British Columbia	Penticton Vees (BCHL)	—
19	(Canada)	Ty Mueller	Freshman	F	5' 11" (1.8 m)	200 lb (91 kg)	2003-02-26	Cochrane, Alberta	Sherwood Park Crusaders (AJHL)	—
20	(Canada)	Jonny Tychonick	Senior	D	6' 0" (1.83 m)	187 lb (85 kg)	2000-03-03	Calgary, Alberta	North Dakota (NCHC)	OTT, 48th overall 2018
22	(United States)	Jimmy Glynn	Sophomore	F	5' 10" (1.78 m)	168 lb (76 kg)	2000-02-24	Lemont, Illinois	Dubuque Fighting Saints (USHL)	—
23	(United States)	Victor Mancini	Freshman	D	6' 4" (1.93 m)	215 lb (98 kg)	2002-05-26	Saginaw, Michigan	Green Bay Gamblers (USHL)	—
26	(United States)	Brock Bremer	Sophomore	F	5' 5" (1.65 m)	140 lb (64 kg)	1999-08-26	Forest Lake, Minnesota	Lincoln Stars (USHL)	—
27	(United States)	Matt Miller	Sophomore	F	6' 2" (1.88 m)	194 lb (88 kg)	1999-09-04	Leo, Indiana	Lincoln Stars (USHL)	—
28	(United States)	Jack Randl	Junior	F	5' 10" (1.78 m)	175 lb (79 kg)	2000-05-07	Carpentersville, Illinois	Omaha Lancers (USHL)	—
29	(United States)	Kaden Bohlsen	Sophomore	F	6' 3" (1.91 m)	192 lb (87 kg)	2001-01-10	Willmar, Minnesota	Fargo Force (USHL)	—
31	(United States)	Isaiah Saville	Junior	G	6' 1" (1.85 m)	196 lb (89 kg)	2000-09-21	Anchorage, Alaska	Tri-City Storm (USHL)	VGK, 135th overall 2019
35	(United States)	Jacob Zab	Junior	G	5' 9" (1.75 m)	175 lb (79 kg)	1998-04-12	Mentor, Ohio	Pittsburgh Vengeance (USPHL)	—
36	(Canada)	Austin Roden	Junior	G	6' 0" (1.83 m)	183 lb (83 kg)	1998-04-30	Victoria, British Columbia	Merritt Centennials (BCHL)	—
39	(United States)	Brannon McManus	Graduate	F	5' 10" (1.78 m)	175 lb (79 kg)	1999-07-05	Newport Beach, California	Minnesota (Big Ten)	—
40	(United States)	Tyler Weiss	Senior	F	5' 11" (1.8 m)	146 lb (66 kg)	2000-01-03	Raleigh, North Carolina	USNTDP (USHL)	COL, 109th overall 2018
44	(Canada)	Jake Harrison	Sophomore	D	5' 9" (1.75 m)	179 lb (81 kg)	1999-04-13	Kelowna, British Columbia	West Kelowna Warriors (BCHL)	—
45	(United States)	Joey Abate	Junior	F	6' 2" (1.88 m)	188 lb (85 kg)	1998-09-26	Bloomingdale, Illinois	Youngstown Phantoms (USHL)	—
48	(United States)	Davis Pennington	Freshman	D	5' 10" (1.78 m)	180 lb (82 kg)	2001-05-27	Saline, Michigan	Muskegon Lumberjacks (USHL)	—

== Standings ==
2021–22 National Collegiate Hockey Conference Standings
	Conference record										Overall record					
	GP	W	L	T	OTW	OTL	3/SW	PTS	GF	GA	GP	W	L	T	GF	GA
#1 Denver †	24	18	6	0	1	0	0	53	98	55	41	31	9	1	175	93
#9 North Dakota †	24	17	6	1	1	1	1	53	78	58	39	24	14	1	119	99
#6 Western Michigan	24	14	9	1	1	0	1	43	84	68	39	26	12	1	138	101
#11 St. Cloud State	24	10	10	4	1	2	1	36	84	69	37	18	15	4	133	97
#5 Minnesota Duluth *	24	10	10	4	1	1	2	36	61	56	42	22	16	4	109	93
Omaha	24	11	13	0	2	1	0	32	65	74	38	21	17	0	123	102
Colorado College	24	6	17	1	2	1	0	18	48	87	36	9	24	3	79	116
Miami	24	4	19	1	0	3	1	17	54	105	36	7	27	2	94	153
Championship: March 19, 2022 † indicates conference regular season champion (Penrose Cup) * indicates conference tournament champion (Frozen Faceoff Championship Trophy); Rankings: USCHO.com Top 20 Poll

== Schedule and results ==
Date	Time	Opponent^{#}	Rank^{#}	Site	TV	Decision	Result	Attendance	Record
Regular season
October 2	7:07 PM	Lake Superior State*	#17	Baxter Arena • Omaha, Nebraska		Saville	L 3–4 ^{OT}	3,397	0–1–0
October 3	6:07 PM	Lake Superior State*	#17	Baxter Arena • Omaha, Nebraska		Saville	W 3–0	2,837	1–1–0
October 8	7:07 PM	Maine*	#17	Baxter Arena • Omaha, Nebraska		Saville	W 4–1	4,036	2–1–0
October 9	6:07 PM	Maine*	#17	Baxter Arena • Omaha, Nebraska		Saville	W 5–3	2,919	3–1–0
October 15	7:07 PM	Alaska*	#13	Baxter Arena • Omaha, Nebraska		Saville	W 3–2	3,709	4–1–0
October 16	4:07 PM	Alaska*	#13	Baxter Arena • Omaha, Nebraska		Saville	W 5–1	3,314	5–1–0
October 29	7:07 PM	Long Island*	#10	Baxter Arena • Omaha, Nebraska		Saville	W 6–0	4,369	6–1–0
October 30	7:07 PM	Long Island*	#10	Baxter Arena • Omaha, Nebraska		Roden	W 7–1	3,654	7–1–0
November 5	7:07 PM	Miami	#9	Baxter Arena • Omaha, Nebraska		Saville	L 3–4	4,325	7–2–0 (0–1–0)
November 6	6:07 PM	Miami	#9	Baxter Arena • Omaha, Nebraska		Saville	W 4–1	4,003	8–2–0 (1–1–0)
November 12	7:37 PM	at #1 St. Cloud State	#11	Herb Brooks National Hockey Center • St. Cloud, Minnesota		Saville	L 1–5	3,825	8–3–0 (1–2–0)
November 13	6:07 PM	at #1 St. Cloud State	#11	Herb Brooks National Hockey Center • St. Cloud, Minnesota		Roden	W 3–2 ^{OT}	0	9–3–0 (2–2–0)
November 19	10:07 PM	at Alaska*	#9	Carlson Center • Fairbanks, Alaska		Roden	W 5–2	2,253	10–3–0
November 20	10:07 PM	at Alaska*	#9	Carlson Center • Fairbanks, Alaska		Roden	W 4–2	1,832	11–3–0
December 3	7:07 PM	Colorado College	#10	Baxter Arena • Omaha, Nebraska		Saville	W 4–3	5,097	12–3–0 (3–2–0)
December 4	6:07 PM	Colorado College	#10	Baxter Arena • Omaha, Nebraska		Roden	L 0–4	4,457	12–4–0 (3–3–0)
December 10	6:05 PM	at #4 Western Michigan	#14	Lawson Arena • Kalamazoo, Michigan		Saville	L 2–4	3,275	12–5–0 (3–4–0)
December 11	6:05 PM	at #4 Western Michigan	#14	Lawson Arena • Kalamazoo, Michigan		Saville	W 1–0	3,673	13–5–0 (4–4–0)
December 31	6:00 PM	at St. Lawrence*	#14	Appleton Arena • Canton, New York		Saville	L 2–3	468	13–6–0
January 1	6:00 PM	at St. Lawrence*	#14	Appleton Arena • Canton, New York		Saville	W 5–0	639	14–6–0
January 15	5:00 PM	at #6 Denver	#15	Magness Arena • Denver, Colorado		Saville	L 2–5	5,197	14–7–0 (4–5–0)
January 16	5:00 PM	at #6 Denver	#15	Magness Arena • Denver, Colorado		Saville	L 0–4	4,208	14–8–0 (4–6–0)
January 21	7:07 PM	#7 Minnesota Duluth	#16	Baxter Arena • Omaha, Nebraska		Saville	L 1–5	4,348	14–9–0 (4–7–0)
January 22	6:07 PM	#7 Minnesota Duluth	#16	Baxter Arena • Omaha, Nebraska		Saville	W 5–1	4,702	15–9–0 (5–7–0)
January 28	8:07 PM	at Colorado College	#16	Ed Robson Arena • Colorado Springs, Colorado	CBSSN	Saville	L 1–4	3,407	15–10–0 (5–8–0)
January 29	7:07 PM	at Colorado College	#16	Ed Robson Arena • Colorado Springs, Colorado	ATTRM	Saville	W 3–2	3,514	16–10–0 (6–8–0)
February 4	7:07 PM	at #12 North Dakota	#18	Ralph Engelstad Arena • Grand Forks, North Dakota		Saville	L 1–4	11,173	16–11–0 (6–9–0)
February 5	6:07 PM	at #12 North Dakota	#18	Ralph Engelstad Arena • Grand Forks, North Dakota		Saville	W 3–2	11,632	17–11–0 (7–9–0)
February 11	6:00 PM	at Miami	#18	Steve Cady Arena • Oxford, Ohio	CBSSN	Saville	L 4–5	2,303	17–12–0 (7–10–0)
February 12	6:05 PM	at Miami	#18	Steve Cady Arena • Oxford, Ohio		Saville	L 2–4	2,614	17–13–0 (7–11–0)
February 18	7:07 PM	#8 St. Cloud State		Baxter Arena • Omaha, Nebraska		Roden	W 5–2	5,011	18–13–0 (8–11–0)
February 19	7:07 PM	#8 St. Cloud State		Baxter Arena • Omaha, Nebraska		Saville	W 5–1	5,454	19–13–0 (9–11–0)
February 25	7:07 PM	#3 Denver		Baxter Arena • Omaha, Nebraska	CBSSN	Saville	W 5–1	5,215	20–13–0 (10–11–0)
February 26	6:07 PM	#3 Denver		Baxter Arena • Omaha, Nebraska		Saville	L 2–5	5,630	20–14–0 (10–12–0)
March 4	7:07 PM	#4 North Dakota	#20	Baxter Arena • Omaha, Nebraska		Roden	L 4–5	6,387	20–15–0 (10–13–0)
March 5	6:07 PM	#4 North Dakota	#20	Baxter Arena • Omaha, Nebraska		Saville	W 4–1	6,748	21–15–0 (11–13–0)
NCHC Tournament
March 11	6:05 PM	at #7 Western Michigan*	#19	Lawson Arena • Kalamazoo, Michigan (Quarterfinal Game 1)		Saville	L 2–4	3,107	21–16–0
March 12	6:05 PM	at #7 Western Michigan*	#19	Lawson Arena • Kalamazoo, Michigan (Quarterfinal Game 2)		Saville	L 4–5 ^{OT}	3,669	21–17–0
Omaha Lost Series 0–2
*Non-conference game. ^{#}Rankings from USCHO.com Poll. All times are in Central Time. Source:

== Scoring statistics ==
Name	Position	Games	Goals	Assists	Points	PIM
Taylor Ward	F	38	19	20	39	39
Tyler Weiss	C/LW	36	8	25	33	20
Brannon McManus	C/RW	34	9	23	32	4
Brandon Scanlin	D	38	6	25	31	31
Chayse Primeau	LW/RW	30	9	14	23	18
Cameron Berg	C	37	8	15	23	14
Kevin Conley	F	37	10	11	21	77
Jack Randl	LW	38	9	11	20	26
Matt Miller	RW	30	10	3	13	14
Ty Mueller	F	24	8	5	13	2
Kirby Proctor	D	37	5	7	12	20
Jimmy Glynn	F	33	5	6	11	29
Brock Bremer	LW	35	4	6	10	18
Nate Knoepke	D	38	1	9	10	14
Jonny Tychonick	D	24	2	6	8	19
Davis Pennington	D	30	2	5	7	20
Nolan Krenzen	D	30	1	5	6	8
Joey Abate	LW	32	2	3	5	54
Victor Mancini	D	38	0	5	5	26
Nolan Sullivan	F	37	3	1	4	34
Jake Harrison	D	7	1	1	2	0
Martin Sundberg	RW	9	1	1	2	2
Jason Smallidge	D	8	0	1	1	4
Kaden Bohlsen	C	19	0	1	1	6
Isaiah Saville	G	30	0	1	1	0
Austin Roden	G	10	0	0	0	0
Total			123	209	332	499

== Goaltending statistics ==
Name	Games	Minutes	Wins	Losses	Ties	Goals against	Saves	Shut outs	SV %	GAA
Isaiah Saville	30	1760	16	14	0	74	725	4	.907	2.52
Austin Roden	10	522	5	3	0	22	246	0	.918	2.53
Empty Net	-	13	-	-	-	6	-	-	-	-
Total	38	2296	21	17	0	102	971	4	.905	2.66

== Rankings ==
Poll	Week																									
Poll	Pre	1	2	3	4	5	6	7	8	9	10	11	12	13	14	15	16	17	18	19	20	21	22	23	24	25 (Final)
USCHO.com	17	17	13	11	10	9	11	9	9	10	14	14	15	15	16	16	18	18	NR	NR	20	19	NR	NR	-	NR
USA Today	NR	15	14	11	9	7	11	10	9	10	14	15	15	NR	NR	NR	NR	NR	NR	NR	NR	NR	NR	NR	NR	NR

Note: USCHO did not release a poll in week 24.

== Players drafted into the NHL ==
=== 2022 NHL entry draft ===
Round	Pick	Player	NHL team
5	159	Victor Mancini	New York Rangers

† incoming freshman
