= 2021–22 Miami RedHawks men's ice hockey season =

- Conference: 8th NCHC
- Home ice: Steve Cady Arena

Rankings
- USCHO: NR
- USA Today: NR

Record
- Overall: 7–27–2
- Conference: 4–19–1
- Home: 4–14–1
- Road: 3–13–1

Coaches and captains
- Head coach: Chris Bergeron
- Assistant coaches: Barry Schutte; Erid Rud
- Captain: Derek Daschke

The 2021–22 Miami RedHawks men's ice hockey season was the 44th season of play for the program and the 9th season in the NCHC conference. The RedHawks represented Miami University and were coached by Chris Bergeron, in his 3rd season.

== Season ==
Miami opened the season with a solid performance but then saw its offense stall for much of the next two months. The RedHawks earned a surprising win over Omaha in early November but that was one of the only bright spots during the first half of the season. While their conference schedule was a murders row of ranked teams, the team couldn't get on track with its non-conference schedule, losing games to Long Island and Ferris State, two of the weakest teams in Division I hockey.

Ludvig Persson received the bulk of minutes in the crease despite fairly pedestrian performance. Even so, he was ill-served by a porous defense that allowed an average of more than 35 shots against per game. As a result, Miami was one of the worst defensive teams in the country. Only St. Thomas, who were playing their first season at the D-I level, allowed more goals.

The team's poor play continued through January, leaving the team with just a single conference win in sixteen matches. After a week off at the beginning of February, however, the RedHawks were able to recharge and sweep a series against the Mavericks, winning consecutive games for the first time in over a year. Even while losing five of their next six to end the regular season, the team kept the score close on most nights and appeared to have found some level of fight.

The late-season improvement did not prevent the team from finishing last in the conference. Miami was set against Denver in the NCHC quarterfinals and, predictably, did not fare well versus the #3 team in the country.

== Departures ==
Player	Position	Nationality	Cause
Will Cullen	Forward	United States	Left mid-season (signed with Bridgeport Islanders)
Casey Gilling	Forward	United States	Graduate transfer to Minnesota Duluth
Phil Knies	Forward	Slovakia	Graduate transfer to Bentley
Ben Kraws	Goaltender	United States	Transferred to Arizona State
Ben Lown	Forward	United States	Graduation (retired)
Alec Mahalak	Defenseman	United States	Graduation (retired)
Caleb Rule	Forward	Canada	Left program (retired)
Rourke Russell	Defenseman	United States	Graduate transfer to Sacred Heart
Grant Valentine	Goaltender	United States	Graduation (retired)

== Recruiting ==
Player	Position	Nationality	Age	Notes
Will Cullen	Defenseman	United States	25	Pelham Manor, NY; transfer from Bowling Green
Thomas Daskas	Forward	United States	22	Rochester Hills, MI; transfer from Air Force
Nick Donato	Defenseman	United States	19	Chicago, IL
PJ Fletcher	Forward	United States	20	Dana Point, CA; transfer from Quinnipiac
Chase Gresock	Forward	United States	23	Powell, OH; transfer from Merrimack
Kirk Laursen	Goaltender	United States	21	Bloomfield Hills, MI
Alex Murray	Defenseman	United States	21	Glenview, IL
Logan Neaton	Goaltender	United States	22	Brighton, MI; transfer from Massachusetts Lowell; selected 144th overall in 2019
Michael Regush	Forward	Canada	23	Surrey, BC; transfer from Cornell
Red Savage	Forward	United States	18	Scottsdale, AZ; selected 114th overall in 2021

== Roster ==
As of September 28, 2021.

No.	Nat.	Player	Class	Pos	Height	Weight	DoB	Hometown	Previous team	NHL rights
1	(United States)	Kirk Laursen	Freshman	G	6' 3" (1.91 m)	175 lb (79 kg)	2000-01-02	Bloomfield, Michigan	New Mexico (NAHL)	—
2	(United States)	Will Cullen	Senior	D	6' 0" (1.83 m)	185 lb (84 kg)	1996-07-24	Pelham Manor, New York	Bowling Green (WCHA)	—
3	(Canada)	Bray Crowder	Senior	D	6' 6" (1.98 m)	210 lb (95 kg)	1998-11-17	Sudbury, Ontario	Muskegon (USHL)	—
4	(United States)	Andrew Sinard	Senior	D	6' 6" (1.98 m)	200 lb (91 kg)	1997-05-22	Brentwood, Tennessee	Aberdeen (NAHL)	—
5	(United States)	Jack Clement	Junior	D	6' 4" (1.93 m)	195 lb (88 kg)	1999-06-09	Detroit, Michigan	Des Moines (USHL)	—
7	(United States)	Robby Drazner	Sophomore	D	6' 1" (1.85 m)	195 lb (88 kg)	2000-02-13	Buffalo Grove, Illinois	Nanaimo (BCHL)	—
8	(United States)	P. J. Fletcher	Sophomore	F	6' 2" (1.88 m)	185 lb (84 kg)	2001-07-12	Dana Point, California	Dubuque (USHL)	—
9	(United States)	Jack Olmstead	Senior	D	5' 10" (1.78 m)	165 lb (75 kg)	1998-02-06	Troy, Michigan	Michigan (Big Ten)	—
10	(United States)	Chase Gresock	Senior	F	6' 1" (1.85 m)	205 lb (93 kg)	1998-08-13	Powell, Ohio	Merrimack (HEA)	—
12	(United States)	John Sladic	Junior	F	5' 8" (1.73 m)	165 lb (75 kg)	1998-01-22	Novi, Michigan	Aberdeen (NAHL)	—
13	(United States)	Derek Daschke (C)	Senior	D	6' 2" (1.88 m)	195 lb (88 kg)	1998-10-13	Troy, Michigan	Chicago (USHL)	—
14	(United States)	Thomas Daskas	Sophomore	F	6' 2" (1.88 m)	200 lb (91 kg)	1999-09-03	Rochester, Michigan	Air Force (AHA)	—
15	(United States)	Nick Donato	Freshman	D	6' 0" (1.83 m)	190 lb (86 kg)	2002-07-27	Lake Forest, Illinois	Tri-City (USHL)	—
16	(Sweden)	Hampus Rydqvist	Sophomore	D	5' 10" (1.78 m)	185 lb (84 kg)	1999-03-12	Gothenburg, Sweden	Maryland (NAHL)	—
17	(Canada)	Michael Regush	Senior	F	6' 1" (1.85 m)	200 lb (91 kg)	1998-09-12	Surrey, British Columbia	Cornell (ECAC)	—
18	(United States)	Monte Graham	Senior	F	5' 11" (1.8 m)	180 lb (82 kg)	1998-04-04	Hanover, Massachusetts	Muskegon (USHL)	—
19	(United States)	Red Savage	Freshman	F	5' 11" (1.8 m)	185 lb (84 kg)	2003-05-15	Scottsdale, Arizona	USNTDP (USHL)	DET, 114th overall 2021
20	(United States)	Michael Holland	Sophomore	F	6' 1" (1.85 m)	190 lb (86 kg)	1999-11-23	Charlotte, North Carolina	Boston Jr. Bruins (NCDC)	—
21	(United States)	Ryan Savage	Junior	F	5' 11" (1.8 m)	180 lb (82 kg)	2000-03-31	Scottsdale, Arizona	Muskegon (USHL)	—
22	(United States)	Joe Cassetti	Sophomore	F	6' 3" (1.91 m)	205 lb (93 kg)	1999-02-28	Pleasanton, California	Waterloo (USHL)	—
23	(United States)	Brian Silver	Sophomore	F	5' 10" (1.78 m)	180 lb (82 kg)	2000-11-06	Lake Bluff, Illinois	Omaha (USHL)	—
24	(United States)	Alex Murray	Freshman	D	5' 11" (1.8 m)	183 lb (83 kg)	2000-03-17	Glenview, Illinois	Lone Star (NAHL)	—
25	(United States)	Scott Corbett	Senior	F	6' 1" (1.85 m)	190 lb (86 kg)	1998-04-14	Carmel, Indiana	Dubuque (USHL)	—
26	(United States)	Matt Barry	Senior	F	6' 0" (1.83 m)	165 lb (75 kg)	1997-09-01	Naperville, Illinois	Holy Cross (AHA)	—
27	(United States)	Dylan Moulton	Sophomore	D	6' 0" (1.83 m)	176 lb (80 kg)	2001-04-24	Nolensville, Tennessee	Green Bay (USHL)	—
28	(United States)	Chase Pletzke	Junior	F	5' 11" (1.8 m)	175 lb (79 kg)	2000-04-10	Bay City, Michigan	Langley (BCHL)	—
29	(United States)	Matthew Barbolini	Sophomore	F	6' 2" (1.88 m)	190 lb (86 kg)	2000-06-01	Williamsville, New York	Lincoln (USHL)	—
31	(United States)	Logan Neaton	Junior	G	6' 4" (1.93 m)	200 lb (91 kg)	1999-04-07	Brighton, Michigan	UMass Lowell (HEA)	WPG, 144th overall 2019
32	(Sweden)	Ludvig Persson	Junior	G	6' 1" (1.85 m)	184 lb (83 kg)	1999-10-06	Hindås, Sweden	Lone Star (NAHL)	—
34	(Canada)	Alec Capstick	Junior	D	6' 2" (1.88 m)	200 lb (91 kg)	1999-02-18	Langley, British Columbia	Langley (BCHL)	—

== Standings ==
2021–22 National Collegiate Hockey Conference Standings
	Conference record										Overall record					
	GP	W	L	T	OTW	OTL	3/SW	PTS	GF	GA	GP	W	L	T	GF	GA
#1 Denver †	24	18	6	0	1	0	0	53	98	55	41	31	9	1	175	93
#9 North Dakota †	24	17	6	1	1	1	1	53	78	58	39	24	14	1	119	99
#6 Western Michigan	24	14	9	1	1	0	1	43	84	68	39	26	12	1	138	101
#11 St. Cloud State	24	10	10	4	1	2	1	36	84	69	37	18	15	4	133	97
#5 Minnesota Duluth *	24	10	10	4	1	1	2	36	61	56	42	22	16	4	109	93
Omaha	24	11	13	0	2	1	0	32	65	74	38	21	17	0	123	102
Colorado College	24	6	17	1	2	1	0	18	48	87	36	9	24	3	79	116
Miami	24	4	19	1	0	3	1	17	54	105	36	7	27	2	94	153
Championship: March 19, 2022 † indicates conference regular season champion (Penrose Cup) * indicates conference tournament champion (Frozen Faceoff Championship Trophy); Rankings: USCHO.com Top 20 Poll

== Schedule and results ==
Date	Time	Opponent^{#}	Rank^{#}	Site	TV	Decision	Result	Attendance	Record
Regular season
October 2	6:07 PM	at Ferris State*		Ewigleben Arena • Big Rapids, Michigan		Persson	W 7–4	1,757	1–0–0
October 3	7:07 PM	at Ferris State*		Ewigleben Arena • Big Rapids, Michigan		Neaton	L 3–4 ^{OT}	1,507	1–1–0
October 15	7:00 PM	at Michigan State*		Munn Ice Arena • East Lansing, Michigan		Persson	L 1–3	6,511	1–2–0
October 16	7:00 PM	at Michigan State*		Munn Ice Arena • East Lansing, Michigan		Persson	L 1–2	5,010	1–3–0
October 22	7:05 PM	Bowling Green*		Steve Cady Arena • Oxford, Ohio		Persson	T 2–2 ^{OT}	3,209	1–3–1
October 23	7:07 PM	Bowling Green*		Steve Cady Arena • Oxford, Ohio		Persson	L 4–6	2,486	1–4–1
November 5	8:07 PM	at #9 Omaha		Baxter Arena • Omaha, Nebraska		Persson	W 4–3	4,325	2–4–1 (1–0–0)
November 6	7:07 PM	at #9 Omaha		Baxter Arena • Omaha, Nebraska		Persson	L 1–4	4,003	2–5–1 (1–1–0)
November 12	7:05 PM	#7 North Dakota		Steve Cady Arena • Oxford, Ohio		Persson	L 1–4	3,135	2–6–1 (1–2–0)
November 13	5:05 PM	#7 North Dakota		Steve Cady Arena • Oxford, Ohio		Persson	L 4–5	2,626	2–7–1 (1–3–0)
November 19	9:07 PM	at #11 Denver		Magness Arena • Denver, Colorado		Persson	L 1–4	4,882	2–8–1 (1–4–0)
November 20	8:07 PM	at #11 Denver		Magness Arena • Denver, Colorado		Neaton	L 1–7	4,916	2–9–1 (1–5–0)
November 26	7:05 PM	Long Island*		Steve Cady Arena • Oxford, Ohio		Persson	L 4–7	1,009	2–10–1
November 27	5:05 PM	Long Island*		Steve Cady Arena • Oxford, Ohio		Neaton	W 4–1	906	3–10–1
December 3	7:05 PM	#6 Western Michigan		Steve Cady Arena • Oxford, Ohio		Neaton	L 3–6	2,116	3–11–1 (1–6–0)
December 4	5:05 PM	#6 Western Michigan		Steve Cady Arena • Oxford, Ohio		Persson	L 3–5	1,881	3–12–1 (1–7–0)
December 12	3:05 PM	at Mercyhurst*		Mercyhurst Ice Center • Erie, Pennsylvania		Persson	W 7–4	858	4–12–1
January 4	7:05 PM	Mercyhurst*		Steve Cady Arena • Oxford, Ohio		Persson	L 4–5 ^{OT}	894	4–13–1
January 7	7:05 PM	Colorado College		Steve Cady Arena • Oxford, Ohio		Neaton	L 1–5	1,182	4–14–1 (1–8–0)
January 8	5:05 PM	Colorado College		Steve Cady Arena • Oxford, Ohio		Persson	L 3–4	1,270	4–15–1 (1–9–0)
January 14	8:07 PM	at #7 Minnesota Duluth		AMSOIL Arena • Duluth, Minnesota		Persson	L 1–4	5,324	4–16–1 (1–10–0)
January 15	8:07 PM	at #7 Minnesota Duluth		AMSOIL Arena • Duluth, Minnesota		Persson	T 2–2 ^{SOW}	5,827	4–16–2 (1–10–1)
January 21	8:37 PM	at #6 St. Cloud State		Herb Brooks National Hockey Center • St. Cloud, Minnesota		Persson	L 1–11	3,740	4–17–2 (1–11–1)
January 22	7:07 PM	at #6 St. Cloud State		Herb Brooks National Hockey Center • St. Cloud, Minnesota		Persson	L 0–8	4,107	4–18–2 (1–12–1)
January 28	7:05 PM	#5 Denver		Steve Cady Arena • Oxford, Ohio		Persson	L 4–5 ^{OT}	2,204	4–19–2 (1–13–1)
January 29	5:05 PM	#5 Denver		Steve Cady Arena • Oxford, Ohio		Persson	L 2–4	2,682	4–20–2 (1–14–1)
February 11	7:00 PM	#18 Omaha		Steve Cady Arena • Oxford, Ohio	CBSSN	Persson	W 5–4	2,303	5–20–2 (2–14–1)
February 12	7:05 PM	#18 Omaha		Steve Cady Arena • Oxford, Ohio		Persson	W 4–2	2,614	6–20–2 (3–14–1)
February 18	9:30 PM	at Colorado College		Ed Robson Arena • Colorado Springs, Colorado	ATTRM	Persson	L 3–4	3,517	6–21–2 (3–15–1)
February 19	8:00 PM	at Colorado College		Ed Robson Arena • Colorado Springs, Colorado	ATTRM	Persson	L 2–3	3,545	6–22–2 (3–16–1)
February 25	7:05 PM	#8 Minnesota Duluth		Steve Cady Arena • Oxford, Ohio		Persson	L 1–3	2,756	6–23–2 (3–17–1)
February 26	5:05 PM	#8 Minnesota Duluth		Steve Cady Arena • Oxford, Ohio		Persson	W 4–0	2,862	7–23–2 (4–17–1)
March 4	7:05 PM	at #8 Western Michigan		Lawson Arena • Kalamazoo, Michigan		Persson	L 3–5	3,053	7–24–2 (4–18–1)
March 5	7:05 PM	at #8 Western Michigan		Lawson Arena • Kalamazoo, Michigan		Persson	L 0–3	3,303	7–25–2 (4–19–1)
NCHC Tournament
March 11	9:07 PM	vs. #3 Denver*		Magness Arena • Denver, Colorado (NCHC Quarterfinal Game 1)		Persson	L 2–5	4,255	7–26–2
March 12	8:07 PM	vs. #3 Denver*		Magness Arena • Denver, Colorado (NCHC Quarterfinal Game 1)		Persson	L 1–5	5,210	7–27–2
Miami Lost Series 0–2
*Non-conference game. ^{#}Rankings from USCHO.com Poll. All times are in Eastern Time. Source:

== Scoring statistics ==
Name	Position	Games	Goals	Assists	Points	PIM
Derek Daschke	D	36	4	24	28	8
P. J. Fletcher	F	35	8	16	24	14
Matt Barry	F	36	8	15	23	20
Matthew Barbolini	F	35	10	12	22	32
Chase Gresock	F	21	9	10	19	6
Redmond Savage	C	35	6	10	16	43
Ryan Savage	RW	30	9	3	12	16
Joe Cassetti	LW	25	6	6	12	19
Jack Olmstead	F	30	5	5	10	8
Dylan Moulton	D	34	3	7	10	18
Hampus Rydqvist	D	28	6	3	9	14
Thomas Daskas	F	29	4	5	9	16
Mike Regush	C	24	3	6	9	16
Monte Graham	F	36	3	5	8	30
Jack Clement	D	36	1	7	8	18
Chase Pletzke	C	31	7	0	7	16
Alec Capstick	D	23	1	4	5	29
John Sladic	F	24	0	4	4	2
Will Cullen	D	7	0	3	3	8
Nick Donato	D	16	0	3	3	22
Brian Silver	F	11	1	1	2	6
Brayden Crowder	D	15	0	2	2	17
Robby Drazner	D	25	0	2	2	8
Scott Corbett	C	25	0	2	2	20
Kirk Laursen	G	1	0	0	0	0
Michael Holland	F	4	0	0	0	0
Alex Murray	D	6	0	0	0	4
Logan Neaton	G	7	0	0	0	8
Andrew Sinard	D	21	0	0	0	4
Ludvig Persson	G	32	0	0	0	0
Total			94	155	249	414

== Goaltending statistics ==
Name	Games	Minutes	Wins	Losses	Ties	Goals against	Saves	Shut outs	SV %	GAA
Ludvig Persson	31	1860	6	23	2	122	1027	1	.894	3.93
Logan Neaton	7	296	1	4	0	22	172	0	.887	4.45
Empty Net	-	24	-	-	-	9	-	-	-	-
Total	36	2182	7	27	2	153	1199	1	.887	4.21

== Rankings ==
Poll	Week																									
Poll	Pre	1	2	3	4	5	6	7	8	9	10	11	12	13	14	15	16	17	18	19	20	21	22	23	24	25 (Final)
USCHO.com	NR	NR	NR	NR	NR	NR	NR	NR	NR	NR	NR	NR	NR	NR	NR	NR	NR	NR	NR	NR	NR	NR	NR	NR	-	NR
USA Today	NR	NR	NR	NR	NR	NR	NR	NR	NR	NR	NR	NR	NR	NR	NR	NR	NR	NR	NR	NR	NR	NR	NR	NR	NR	NR

Note: USCHO did not release a poll in week 24.
