= 2021–22 Colorado College Tigers men's ice hockey season =

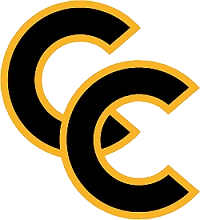
- Conference: 7th NCHC
- Home ice: Ed Robson Arena

Rankings
- USCHO: NR
- USA Today: NR

Record
- Overall: 9–24–3
- Conference: 6–17–1
- Home: 5–11–1
- Road: 4–13–2

Coaches and captains
- Head coach: Kris Mayotte
- Assistant coaches: Peter Mannino; Mark Stuart
- Captain(s): Brian Hawkinson; Bryan Yoon

The 2021–22 Colorado College Tigers men's ice hockey season was the 82nd season of play for the program and the 9th in the NCHC conference. The Tigers represented Colorado College and were coached by Kris Mayotte, in his 1st season.

== Season ==
Colorado College enters the 2021–22 season with both a new head coach and a new home arena, with the on-campus Ed Robson Arena officially opening with an exhibition game against local rival Air Force on October 2, 2021. The season turned out to be effectively a rebuilding year for the program with the team's offense being substandard for most of the campaign. While the defense wasn't much better, sophomore Dominic Basse kept the Tigers in many games early in the season. Despite some goaltending heroics, CC's pop-gun offense provided the team with just 2 wins in their first 13 games.

While the team was never fully able to get on track, Colorado College managed to stay out of the NCHC basement on the strength of a season sweep of Miami. The four wins against the RedHawks made up almost half of the Tigers' total for the year.

As the campaign progressed, Basse's play in net became inconsistent and he ended up splitting time with Matt Vernon. By the end of the season, Vernon had taken control of the starting role and was in goal for the team's two playoff games. While CC lost both matches, Vernon acquitted himself well by surrendering just 2 goals in each game to North Dakota.

== Departures ==
Player	Position	Nationality	Cause
Zach Berzolla	Defenseman	United States	Graduation (Signed with Florida Everblades)
Troy Conzo	Forward	United States	Graduate transfer to Sacred Heart
Ben Copeland	Forward	United States	Transferred to Penn State
Grant Cruikshank	Forward	United States	Transferred to Minnesota
McKay Flanagan	Defenseman	United States	Graduation (retired)
Jack Gates	Forward	United States	Graduation (retired)
Josiah Slavin	Forward	United States	Graduation (Signed with Chicago Blackhawks)
Casey Staum	Defenseman	United States	Left Program (retired)
Brian Williams	Forward	United States	Graduation (retired)

== Recruiting ==
Player	Position	Nationality	Age	Notes
Brett Chorske	Defenseman	United States	20	Edina, MN
Stan Cooley	Forward	Canada	19	Ottawa, ON
Cooper Fensterstock	Forward	United States	21	Charlotte, NC
Tommy Middleton	Forward	United States	21	Midland, MI
Noah Prokop	Forward	United States	21	Highlands Ranch, CO; transfer from Omaha
Nate Schweitzer	Defenseman	United States	19	Champlin, MN
Danny Weight	Forward	United States	20	Edmonton, AB; transfer from Boston College

== Roster ==
As of August 12, 2021.

No.	Nat.	Player	Class	Pos	Height	Weight	DoB	Hometown	Previous team	NHL rights
1	(United States)	Jake Begley	Sophomore	G	6' 1" (1.85 m)	166 lb (75 kg)	1999-03-18	Mahtomedi, Minnesota	Brockville Braves (CCHL)	—
2	(United States)	Chad Sasaki	Junior	D	5' 7" (1.7 m)	150 lb (68 kg)	1998-02-06	Cypress, California	Wenatchee Wild (BCHL)	—
3	(United States)	Cooper Fensterstock	Freshman	F	6' 0" (1.83 m)	181 lb (82 kg)	2000-09-27	Charlotte, North Carolina	Amarillo Bulls (NAHL)	—
4	(United States)	Bryan Yoon (C)	Senior	D	6' 1" (1.85 m)	171 lb (78 kg)	1998-01-27	Parker, Colorado	Tri-City Storm (USHL)	—
5	(United States)	Jack Millar	Sophomore	D	6' 5" (1.96 m)	211 lb (96 kg)	2000-11-30	Westminster, Colorado	Cedar Rapids RoughRiders (USHL)	—
7	(United States)	Chase Foley	Sophomore	D	5' 10" (1.78 m)	168 lb (76 kg)	2000-02-17	Mendota Heights, Minnesota	Sioux Falls Stampede (USHL)	—
9	(United States)	Jackson Ross	Senior	D	6' 0" (1.83 m)	184 lb (83 kg)	1997-03-28	Denver, Colorado	Surrey Eagles (BCHL)	—
10	(United States)	Patrick Cozzi	Junior	F	5' 9" (1.75 m)	167 lb (76 kg)	1998-04-30	Greenlawn, New York	Prince George Spruce Kings (BCHL)	—
11	(United States)	Ray Christy	Sophomore	F	5' 10" (1.78 m)	165 lb (75 kg)	1999-09-15	St. Paul, Minnesota	Sioux City Musketeers (USHL)	—
12	(United States)	Tommy Middleton	Freshman	F	5' 11" (1.8 m)	176 lb (80 kg)	2000-06-19	Midland, Michigan	Janesville Jets (NAHL)	—
13	(United States)	Brett Chorske	Freshman	F	6' 6" (1.98 m)	190 lb (86 kg)	2001-05-24	Edina, Minnesota	St. Cloud Norsemen (NAHL)	—
14	(United States)	Nate Schweitzer	Freshman	D	6' 0" (1.83 m)	187 lb (85 kg)	2002-02-21	Champlin, Minnesota	Sioux Falls Stampede (USHL)	—
15	(United States)	Matthew Gleason	Sophomore	F	5' 8" (1.73 m)	175 lb (79 kg)	2001-09-20	St. Paul, Minnesota	Chicago Steel (USHL)	—
16	(United States)	Jackson Jutting	Sophomore	F	5' 10" (1.78 m)	196 lb (89 kg)	2001-02-27	Savage, Minnesota	Cedar Rapids RoughRiders (USHL)	—
17	(United States)	Tyler Coffey	Sophomore	F	5' 10" (1.78 m)	179 lb (81 kg)	2000-05-19	Hamilton, New Jersey	Sioux Falls Stampede (USHL)	—
18	(United States)	Connor Mayer	Junior	D	5' 11" (1.8 m)	177 lb (80 kg)	1999-06-13	Champlin, Minnesota	Central Illinois Flying Aces (USHL)	—
19	(Canada)	Jordan Biro	Sophomore	F	5' 8" (1.73 m)	160 lb (73 kg)	2000-08-10	Sherwood Park, Alberta	Spruce Grove Saints (AJHL)	—
20	(United States)	Logan Will	Sophomore	F	5' 11" (1.8 m)	186 lb (84 kg)	2000-06-14	Ames, Iowa	Omaha Lancers (USHL)	—
21	(United States)	Noah Prokop	Junior	F	6' 1" (1.85 m)	198 lb (90 kg)	2000-01-15	Highlands Ranch, Colorado	Omaha (NCHC)	—
22	(United States)	Dominic Basse	Sophomore	G	6' 6" (1.98 m)	184 lb (83 kg)	2001-04-22	Alexandria, Virginia	Youngstown Phantoms (USHL)	CHI, 167th overall 2019
23	(Sweden)	Hugo Blixt	Senior	F	6' 4" (1.93 m)	199 lb (90 kg)	1998-01-02	Linköping, Sweden	Boston University (HEA)	—
27	(Canada)	Stanley Cooley	Freshman	F	5' 11" (1.8 m)	194 lb (88 kg)	2002-05-27	Ottawa, Ontario	Lincoln Stars (USHL)	—
29	(United States)	Brian Hawkinson (C)	Senior	F	5' 10" (1.78 m)	170 lb (77 kg)	1998-01-10	Centennial, Colorado	Miami (NCHC)	—
30	(Canada)	Matt Vernon	Junior	G	5' 11" (1.8 m)	166 lb (75 kg)	1998-03-29	Calgary, Alberta	Aberdeen Wings (NAHL)	—
34	(Canada)	Marc Pasemko	Sophomore	F	5' 9" (1.75 m)	170 lb (77 kg)	1999-04-06	Edmonton, Alberta	Okotoks Oilers (AJHL)	—
37	(United States)	Nicklas Andrews	Sophomore	D	5' 0" (1.52 m)	192 lb (87 kg)	2001-07-06	Canton, Michigan	Des Moines Buccaneers (USHL)	—
39	(United States)	Danny Weight	Sophomore	F	6' 0" (1.83 m)	174 lb (79 kg)	2001-05-01	Lattingtown, New York	Boston College (HEA)	—
41	(United States)	Hunter McKown	Sophomore	F	6' 1" (1.85 m)	195 lb (88 kg)	2002-08-18	San Jose, California	USNTDP (USHL)	—

== Standings ==
2021–22 National Collegiate Hockey Conference Standings
	Conference record										Overall record					
	GP	W	L	T	OTW	OTL	3/SW	PTS	GF	GA	GP	W	L	T	GF	GA
#1 Denver †	24	18	6	0	1	0	0	53	98	55	41	31	9	1	175	93
#9 North Dakota †	24	17	6	1	1	1	1	53	78	58	39	24	14	1	119	99
#6 Western Michigan	24	14	9	1	1	0	1	43	84	68	39	26	12	1	138	101
#11 St. Cloud State	24	10	10	4	1	2	1	36	84	69	37	18	15	4	133	97
#5 Minnesota Duluth *	24	10	10	4	1	1	2	36	61	56	42	22	16	4	109	93
Omaha	24	11	13	0	2	1	0	32	65	74	38	21	17	0	123	102
Colorado College	24	6	17	1	2	1	0	18	48	87	36	9	24	3	79	116
Miami	24	4	19	1	0	3	1	17	54	105	36	7	27	2	94	153
Championship: March 19, 2022 † indicates conference regular season champion (Penrose Cup) * indicates conference tournament champion (Frozen Faceoff Championship Trophy); Rankings: USCHO.com Top 20 Poll

== Schedule and results ==
Date	Time	Opponent^{#}	Rank^{#}	Site	TV	Decision	Result	Attendance	Record
Exhibition
October 2	6:00 PM	Air Force*		Ed Robson Arena • Colorado Springs, Colorado (Exhibition)			L 1–2	3,502	
Regular season
October 8	7:07 PM	St. Lawrence*		Ed Robson Arena • Colorado Springs, Colorado		Basse	L 1–2	3,589	0–1–0
October 9	6:07 PM	St. Lawrence*		Ed Robson Arena • Colorado Springs, Colorado		Basse	T 1–1	3,571	0–1–1
October 15	5:00 PM	at Union*		Achilles Rink • Schenectady, New York		Basse	L 1–2	1,435	0–2–1
October 16	5:00 PM	at Union*		Achilles Rink • Schenectady, New York		Basse	T 3–3	0	0–2–2
October 22	7:00 PM	at #10 Boston College*		Conte Forum • Chestnut Hill, Massachusetts	NESN	Basse	W 5–3	5,242	1–2–2
October 23	5:00 PM	at #20 Northeastern*		Matthews Arena • Boston, Massachusetts	NESN+	Basse	L 0–1	4,650	1–3–2
October 29	7:05 PM	at Air Force*		Cadet Ice Arena • Colorado Springs, Colorado		Basse	L 4–5 ^{OT}	2,650	1–4–2
October 30	5:07 PM	Air Force*		Ed Robson Arena • Colorado Springs, Colorado		Basse	W 8–1	3,570	2–4–2
November 5	7:07 PM	#1 St. Cloud State		Ed Robson Arena • Colorado Springs, Colorado	ATTRM	Basse	L 2–3 ^{OT}	3,566	2–5–2 (0–1–0)
November 6	6:07 PM	#1 St. Cloud State		Ed Robson Arena • Colorado Springs, Colorado		Basse	L 1–4	3,579	2–6–2 (0–2–0)
November 12	6:07 PM	at #4 Minnesota Duluth		AMSOIL Arena • Duluth, Minnesota	ATTRM	Basse	L 0–5	5,985	2–7–2 (0–3–0)
November 13	6:07 PM	at #4 Minnesota Duluth		AMSOIL Arena • Duluth, Minnesota		Vernon	T 0–0 ^{SOL}	6,435	2–7–3 (0–3–1)
December 3	6:07 PM	at #10 Omaha		Baxter Arena • Omaha, Nebraska		Vernon	L 3–4	5,097	2–8–3 (0–4–1)
December 4	6:07 PM	at #10 Omaha		Baxter Arena • Omaha, Nebraska		Basse	W 4–0	4,457	3–8–3 (1–4–1)
December 10	7:07 PM	#7 North Dakota		Ed Robson Arena • Colorado Springs, Colorado	ATTRM	Basse	L 2–5	3,587	3–9–3 (1–5–1)
December 11	6:07 PM	#7 North Dakota		Ed Robson Arena • Colorado Springs, Colorado		Basse	L 1–4	3,569	3–10–3 (1–6–1)
December 17	7:07 PM	Arizona State*		Ed Robson Arena • Colorado Springs, Colorado		Vernon	L 2–5	3,528	3–11–3
December 18	6:07 PM	Arizona State*		Ed Robson Arena • Colorado Springs, Colorado		Basse	W 4–2	3,531	4–11–3
January 7	5:05 PM	at Miami		Steve Cady Arena • Oxford, Ohio		Basse	W 5–1	1,182	5–11–3 (2–6–1)
January 8	3:05 PM	at Miami		Steve Cady Arena • Oxford, Ohio		Basse	W 4–3	1,270	6–11–3 (3–6–1)
January 21	7:07 PM	at #5 Denver		Magness Arena • Denver, Colorado (Battle for the Gold Pan)	CBSN	Basse	L 0–5	5,662	6–12–3 (3–7–1)
January 22	6:07 PM	#5 Denver		Ed Robson Arena • Colorado Springs, Colorado	ATTRM	Basse	L 0–4	3,588	6–13–3 (3–8–1)
January 28	7:07 PM	#16 Omaha		Ed Robson Arena • Colorado Springs, Colorado	CBSN	Vernon	W 4–1	3,407	7–13–3 (4–8–1)
January 29	6:07 PM	#16 Omaha		Ed Robson Arena • Colorado Springs, Colorado	ATTRM	Vernon	L 2–3	3,514	7–14–3 (4–9–1)
February 4	7:30 PM	#5 Western Michigan		Ed Robson Arena • Colorado Springs, Colorado	ATTRM	Vernon	L 2–8	3,441	7–15–3 (4–10–1)
February 5	6:00 PM	#5 Western Michigan		Ed Robson Arena • Colorado Springs, Colorado		Basse	L 4–5	3,512	7–16–3 (4–11–1)
February 11	6:00 PM	at #12 North Dakota		Ralph Engelstad Arena • Grand Forks, North Dakota	ATTRM	Basse	L 2–3	10,842	7–17–3 (4–12–1)
February 12	5:00 PM	at #12 North Dakota		Ralph Engelstad Arena • Grand Forks, North Dakota		Basse	L 0–4	11,180	7–18–3 (4–13–1)
February 18	7:07 PM	Miami		Ed Robson Arena • Colorado Springs, Colorado	ATTRM	Vernon	W 4–3	3,517	8–18–3 (5–13–1)
February 19	6:07 PM	Miami		Ed Robson Arena • Colorado Springs, Colorado	ATTRM	Vernon	W 3–2	3,545	9–18–3 (6–13–1)
February 25	6:30 PM	at #11 St. Cloud State		Herb Brooks National Hockey Center • St. Cloud, Minnesota		Vernon	L 1–4	3,857	9–19–3 (6–14–1)
February 26	5:00 PM	at #11 St. Cloud State		Herb Brooks National Hockey Center • St. Cloud, Minnesota		Vernon	L 2–6	5,128	9–20–3 (6–15–1)
March 4	7:30 PM	#3 Denver		Ed Robson Arena • Colorado Springs, Colorado (Rivalry)	ATTRM	Basse	L 0–5	3,891	9–21–3 (6–16–1)
March 5	7:00 PM	at #3 Denver		Magness Arena • Denver, Colorado		Basse	L 2–5	6,321	9–22–3 (6–17–1)
NCHC Tournament
March 11	8:07 PM	vs. #5 North Dakota*		Ralph Engelstad Arena • Grand Forks, North Dakota (Quarterfinal Game 1)		Vernon	L 1–2	10,475	9–23–3
March 12	6:07 PM	vs. #5 North Dakota*		Ralph Engelstad Arena • Grand Forks, North Dakota (Quarterfinal Game 2)		Vernon	L 1–2	10,095	9–24–3
Colorado College Lost Series 0–2
*Non-conference game. ^{#}Rankings from USCHO.com Poll. All times are in Mountain Time. Source:

== Scoring Statistics ==
Name	Position	Games	Goals	Assists	Points	PIM
Hunter McKown	RW	36	13	8	21	29
Logan Will	F	32	6	12	18	16
Stan Cooley	C	36	6	12	18	22
Matthew Gleason	C	28	6	10	16	2
Nicklas Andrews	D	33	4	11	15	8
Tyler Coffey	F	29	10	4	14	6
Jordan Biro	C	35	6	7	13	4
Danny Weight	C	32	1	11	12	41
Bryan Yoon	D	36	1	11	12	10
Brian Hawkinson	RW	35	5	6	11	10
Jackson Jutting	F	35	3	7	10	12
Patrick Cozzi	RW	35	2	8	10	4
Brett Chorske	C	21	4	5	9	10
Chase Foley	D	23	1	5	6	18
Connor Mayer	D	32	1	5	6	24
Jack Millar	D	36	1	5	6	8
Nate Schweitzer	D	31	2	3	5	14
Tommy Middleton	F	35	2	3	5	32
Ray Christy	F	21	2	1	3	21
Noah Prokop	C	26	1	2	3	59
Marc Pasemko	F	16	1	0	1	6
Hugo Blixt	D	31	1	0	1	16
Jackson Ross	D	2	0	0	0	2
Chad Sasaki	D	4	0	0	0	2
Cooper Fensterstock	F	4	0	0	0	0
Matt Vernon	G	16	0	0	0	0
Dominic Basse	G	24	0	0	0	0
Total			79	136	215	376

== Goaltending statistics ==
Name	Games	Minutes	Wins	Losses	Ties	Goals against	Saves	Shut outs	SV %	GAA
Matt Vernon	16	836	3	9	1	39	386	1	.908	2.80
Dominic Basse	24	1320	6	15	2	71	563	1	.888	3.23
Empty Net	-	27	-	-	-	6	-	-	-	-
Total	36	2184	9	24	3	116	949	2	.891	3.18

== Rankings ==
Poll	Week																									
Poll	Pre	1	2	3	4	5	6	7	8	9	10	11	12	13	14	15	16	17	18	19	20	21	22	23	24	25 (Final)
USCHO.com	NR	NR	NR	NR	NR	NR	NR	NR	NR	NR	NR	NR	NR	NR	NR	NR	NR	NR	NR	NR	NR	NR	NR	NR	-	NR
USA Today	NR	NR	NR	NR	NR	NR	NR	NR	NR	NR	NR	NR	NR	NR	NR	NR	NR	NR	NR	NR	NR	NR	NR	NR	NR	NR

Note: USCHO did not release a poll in week 24.
