= Carter Mazur =

American ice hockey player (born 2002)

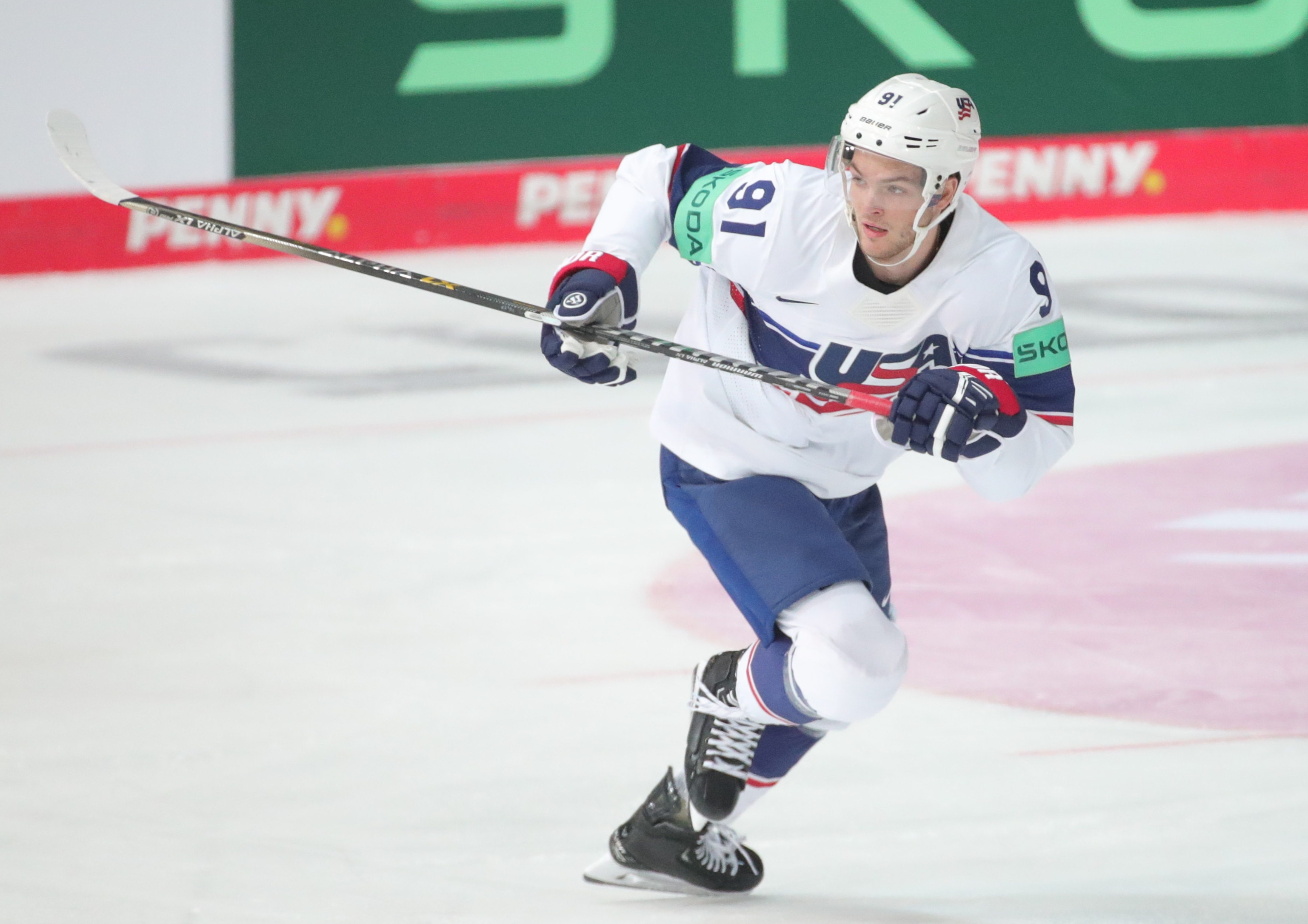
- Mazur with Team USA in 2023
- Born: March 28, 2002 (age 24) Jackson, Michigan, U.S.
- Height: 6 ft 0 in (183 cm)
- Weight: 173 lb (78 kg; 12 st 5 lb)
- Position: Left wing
- Shoots: Right
- NHL team: Detroit Red Wings
- National team: United States
- NHL draft: 70th overall, 2021; Detroit Red Wings
- Playing career: 2023–present

Carter Mazur (born March 28, 2002) is an American professional ice hockey player who is a left winger for the Detroit Red Wings of the National Hockey League (NHL). Mazur played college ice hockey at Denver. He was drafted 70th overall by the Red Wings in the 2021 NHL entry draft.

== Playing career ==
=== College ===
Mazur began his collegiate career for the Denver Pioneers during the 2021–22 season, where he recorded 14 goals and 21 assists in 41 games. He led all Denver freshmen and finished tied for fifth on the team in scoring with 38 points, and finished second in NCAA scoring for a freshman, trailing only Luke Hughes with 39 points. Following the season he was named to the All-NCHC Rookie Team and named the NCHC Rookie of the Year.

On September 22, 2022, he was named an alternate captain for the 2022–23 season. During his sophomore year he recorded 22 goals and 15 assists in 40 games. On October 28, 2022, Mazur recorded his first career hat-trick in a game against Miami. He led the Pioneers in goals (22), power play goals (8), game-winning goals (6) and shots (131). His 22 goals tied for fifth in the NCAA. Following the season he was named to the All-NCHC Second Team and an AHCA West Second Team All-American.

=== Professional ===
On March 28, 2023, Mazur signed a three-year, entry-level contract with the Detroit Red Wings. He finished his collegiate career with 75 points in 81 games. He was subsequently assigned to the Red Wings' AHL affiliate, the Grand Rapids Griffins on an amateur tryout.

Mazur began the 2024–25 season with the Griffins, and recorded eight goals and seven assists in 20 games. He was sidelined from October 19, 2024 to January 18, 2025 with an upper-body injury. On March 6, 2025, Mazur was recalled by the Red Wings. He made his NHL debut later that day in a game against the Utah Hockey Club. He played on the fourth line along with Tyler Motte and Jonatan Berggren, and skated two shifts, before leaving the game due to an upper-body injury.

== International play ==
Mazur represented the United States at the 2022 World Junior Ice Hockey Championships, where he led the team in scoring with five goals and two assists in five games. His five goals ranked tied for second overall during the tournament.

== Career statistics ==
=== Regular season and playoffs ===
			Regular season					Playoffs
Season	Team	League	GP	G	A	Pts	PIM	GP	G	A	Pts	PIM
2018–19	Tri-City Storm	USHL	1	0	0	0	0	—	—	—	—	—
2019–20	Tri-City Storm	USHL	47	6	7	13	49	—	—	—	—	—
2020–21	Tri-City Storm	USHL	47	20	24	44	37	3	1	1	2	4
2021–22	University of Denver	NCHC	41	14	24	38	44	—	—	—	—	—
2022–23	University of Denver	NCHC	40	22	15	37	32	—	—	—	—	—
2022–23	Grand Rapids Griffins	AHL	6	3	3	6	0	—	—	—	—	—
2023–24	Grand Rapids Griffins	AHL	60	17	20	37	48	9	3	5	8	18
2024–25	Grand Rapids Griffins	AHL	20	8	7	15	8	—	—	—	—	—
2024–25	Detroit Red Wings	NHL	1	0	0	0	0	—	—	—	—	—
2025–26	Grand Rapids Griffins	AHL	16	11	5	16	14	8	5	1	6	2
2025–26	Detroit Red Wings	NHL	8	0	0	0	0	—	—	—	—	—
NHL totals			9	0	0	0	0	—	—	—	—	—

=== International ===
Year	Team	Event	Result	GP	G	A	Pts	PIM
2022	United States	WJC	5th	5	5	2	7	0
2023	United States	WC	4th	10	1	3	4	6
Junior totals				5	5	2	7	0
Senior totals				10	1	3	4	6

== Awards and honors ==
Award	Year
College
All-NCHC Rookie Team	2022
NCHC Rookie of the Year	2022
All-NCHC Second Team	2023
AHCA West Second Team All-American	2023

Awards and achievements
Preceded by Veeti Miettinen	NCHC Rookie of the Year; 2021–22	Succeeded by Jackson Blake
