= 2021–22 Alaska Nanooks men's ice hockey season =

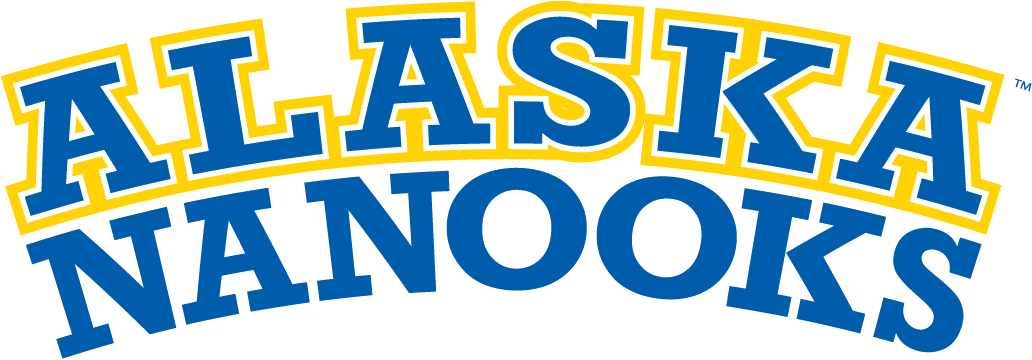
- Conference: Independent
- Home ice: Carlson Center

Rankings
- USCHO: NR
- USA Today: NR

Record
- Overall: 14–18–2
- Home: 8–5–1
- Road: 6–13–1

Coaches and captains
- Head coach: Erik Largen
- Assistant coaches: Chris Brown; Lenny Hoffman; Josh Erickson; Eric Yancey

The 2021–22 Alaska Nanooks men's ice hockey season was the 72nd season of play for the program and the 37th at the Division I level. The Nanooks represented the University of Alaska Fairbanks and were coached by Erik Largen in his 3rd season.

== Season ==
After the decision to cancel their previous season due to the COVID-19 pandemic, Alaska returned to the ice for the first time in 40 years without their long-time rival, Alaska Anchorage. The loss of their most consistent opponent could not have come at a worse time as the Nanooks also found themselves without a conference for the first time since the mid-1990s. The only advantage that Alaska had was that the NCAA still did not count games against schools from Alaska towards a team's limit of games per year. This allowed the Nanooks to insert themselves into the schedule of their opponents on short notice.

Alaska was rather ambitious with its early-season slate, playing their first 12 games against teams that were ranked for most or all of the season. As a result the Nanooks, who were still trying to build team chemistry, began the year with a terrible 1–12 record. It wasn't until December that the players started to work together consistently, but the early season struggles forged the Nanooks into a unified group.

After winning three consecutive games against Rensselaer, Alaska tied Denver and then defeated Minnesota, both of whom finished the season as top-5 teams. The Nanooks even managed to sweep Arizona State, who had NCAA tournament aspirations, in the midst of a 5-game winning streak. After December 10, Alaska finished their season 12–6–2 and demonstrated a tremendous improvement throughout the year.

== Departures ==
Player	Position	Nationality	Cause
Roberts Blugers	Forward	Latvia	Left mid-season (signed with Pensacola Ice Flyers)
Chris Jandric	Defenseman	Canada	Transferred to North Dakota

== Recruiting ==
Player	Position	Nationality	Age	Notes
Arvils Bergmanis	Defenseman	Latvia	21	Riga, LAT
Karl Falk	Defenseman	Sweden	21	Värmdö, SWE
Simon Falk	Forward	Sweden	21	Värmdö, SWE
Payton Matsui	Forward	United States	21	Lakeville, MN
Matt McKim	Forward	Canada	21	St. John's, NL
Matt Koethe	Forward	United States	21	Minnetonka, MN
Connor Mylymok	Forward	United States	21	Jackson, MS
Nátán Vertes	Forward	Hungary	21	Budapest, HUN

== Roster ==
As of September 23, 2021.

No.	Nat.	Player	Class	Pos	Height	Weight	DoB	Hometown	Previous team	NHL rights
1	(Canada)	Daniel Allin	Sophomore	G	6' 2" (1.88 m)	185 lb (84 kg)	2000-02-11	Edmonton, Alberta	Drumheller (AJHL)	—
2	(Sweden)	Karl Falk	Freshman	D	6' 3" (1.91 m)	205 lb (93 kg)	2000-01-20	Västerås, Sweden	Minnesota Magicians (NAHL)	—
4	(Latvia)	Kristaps Jākobsons	Freshman (RS)	D	6' 0" (1.83 m)	202 lb (92 kg)	1996-12-25	Tukums, Latvia	Zemgale (LHL)	—
5	(Latvia)	Markuss Komuls	Junior	D	5' 10" (1.78 m)	187 lb (85 kg)	1998-01-04	Talsi, Latvia	Kenai River (NAHL)	—
6	(Sweden)	Didrik Henbrandt	Junior	F	5' 10" (1.78 m)	169 lb (77 kg)	1998-04-10	Linköping, Sweden	Minot (NAHL)	—
7	(Canada)	Garrett Pyke	Junior	D	6' 1" (1.85 m)	190 lb (86 kg)	1999-08-01	Toronto, Ontario	Oakville (OJHL)	—
8	(United States)	Jordan Muzzillo	Senior	D	6' 0" (1.83 m)	185 lb (84 kg)	1997-03-24	Capron, Illinois	Springfield (NAHL)	—
9	(Canada)	Matt McKim	Freshman	F	5' 10" (1.78 m)	175 lb (79 kg)	2000-03-17	St. John's, Newfoundland and Labrador	Valley (MHL)	—
10	(Latvia)	Ēriks Žohovs	Junior	F	6' 0" (1.83 m)	196 lb (89 kg)	1997-11-26	Riga, Latvia	Zemgale (LHL)	—
11	(Canada)	Brady Risk	Sophomore	F	5' 9" (1.75 m)	175 lb (79 kg)	1999-03-16	Medicine Hat, Alberta	Drumheller (AJHL)	—
12	(United States)	Caleb Hite	Senior	F	5' 11" (1.8 m)	185 lb (84 kg)	1997-02-11	Grand Blanc, Michigan	Fairbanks (NAHL)	—
13	(Sweden)	Filip Fornåå Svensson	Junior	F	6' 4" (1.93 m)	205 lb (93 kg)	1999-01-05	Linköping, Sweden	Linköpings J20 (J20 SuperElit)	—
14	(Russia)	Anton Rubtsov	Sophomore	F	5' 10" (1.78 m)	165 lb (75 kg)	1999-03-06	Saint Petersburg, Russia	Shreveport (NAHL)	—
15	(Canada)	Antonio DiPaolo	Sophomore	F	5' 11" (1.8 m)	190 lb (86 kg)	1999-01-14	Saskatoon, Saskatchewan	Aberdeen (NAHL)	—
16	(Canada)	Chase Dubois	Freshman (RS)	F	5' 9" (1.75 m)	160 lb (73 kg)	1998-03-12	Williams Lake, British Columbia	West Kelowna (BCHL)	—
17	(Canada)	Colin Doyle	Senior	F	5' 10" (1.78 m)	185 lb (84 kg)	1998-05-12	Campbellford, Ontario	Wellington (OJHL)	—
18	(United States)	Riley Murphy	Sophomore	F	6' 0" (1.83 m)	192 lb (87 kg)	1999-10-29	Rockford, Michigan	Aberdeen (NAHL)	—
20	(Sweden)	Simon Falk	Freshman	F	6' 3" (1.91 m)	200 lb (91 kg)	2000-01-20	Västerås, Sweden	Minnesota Magicians (NAHL)	—
23	(Latvia)	Roberts Kaļķis	Junior	D	6' 1" (1.85 m)	210 lb (95 kg)	1998-12-22	Riga, Latvia	Rīga (MHL)	—
24	(Canada)	Harrison Israels	Sophomore	F	6' 1" (1.85 m)	200 lb (91 kg)	1999-09-01	Mississauga, Ontario	Oakville (OJHL)	—
25	(Finland)	Antti Virtanen	Senior	F	6' 0" (1.83 m)	185 lb (84 kg)	1998-03-14	Kittilä, Finland	Sioux Falls (USHL)	—
26	(United States)	Payton Matsui	Freshman	F	5' 7" (1.7 m)	160 lb (73 kg)	2000-04-15	Lakeville, Minnesota	Aberdeen (NAHL)	—
27	(Latvia)	Robert Blueger	Junior	F	6' 3" (1.91 m)	185 lb (84 kg)	1998-08-03	Riga, Latvia	Lake Superior State (WCHA)	—
28	(Canada)	Brayden Nicholetts	Sophomore	F	5' 11" (1.8 m)	180 lb (82 kg)	1999-08-27	Spruce Grove, Alberta	Spruce Grove (AJHL)	—
29	(Hungary)	Nátán Vertes	Freshman	F	5' 11" (1.8 m)	173 lb (78 kg)	2000-05-19	Budapest, Hungary	Aberdeen (NAHL)	—
30	(Latvia)	Gustavs Dāvis Grigals	Senior	G	6' 2" (1.88 m)	189 lb (86 kg)	1998-07-22	Riga, Latvia	Shreveport (NAHL)	—
32	(Canada)	Connor Mylymok	Freshman	F	6' 1" (1.85 m)	205 lb (93 kg)	2000-03-18	Wilcox, Saskatchewan	Austin (NAHL)	—
35	(United States)	Austin Ryman	Sophomore	G	5' 10" (1.78 m)	185 lb (84 kg)	2000-11-20	Fairbanks, Alaska	Fairbanks Ice Dogs (NAHL)	—
37	(Canada)	Jakob Breault	Sophomore	F	5' 11" (1.8 m)	180 lb (82 kg)	1999-10-04	Acton Vale, Quebec	Aberdeen (NAHL)	—
38	(Latvia)	Arvils Bergmanis	Freshman	D	5' 11" (1.8 m)	187 lb (85 kg)	1999-12-29	Riga, Latvia	Olimp Riga (LHL)	—
40	(United States)	Matt Koethe	Sophomore	F	5' 10" (1.78 m)	185 lb (84 kg)	1999-09-28	Minnetonka, Minnesota	Fairbanks (NAHL)	—

== Standings ==
2021–22 NCAA Division I Independent ice hockey standings
	Overall record					
	GP	W	L	T	GF	GA
Alaska	34	14	18	2	87	95
Arizona State	35	17	17	1	116	121
Long Island	34	10	21	3	87	120
Rankings: USCHO.com Top 20 Poll

== Schedule and results ==
Date	Time	Opponent^{#}	Rank^{#}	Site	TV	Decision	Result	Attendance	Record
Regular Season
October 8	7:07 PM	#20 Clarkson*		Carlson Center • Fairbanks, Alaska		Grigals	L 1–2	1,278	0–1–0
October 9	7:07 PM	#20 Clarkson*		Carlson Center • Fairbanks, Alaska		Grigals	W 2–1	1,412	1–1–0
October 15	4:07 PM	at #13 Omaha*		Baxter Arena • Omaha, Nebraska		Grigals	L 2–3	3,709	1–2–0
October 17	1:07 PM	at #13 Omaha*		Baxter Arena • Omaha, Nebraska		Grigals	L 1–5	3,314	1–3–0
October 22	3:00 PM	at Clarkson*		Cheel Arena • Potsdam, New York		Allin	L 1–5	2,396	1–4–0
October 23	3:00 PM	at Clarkson*		Cheel Arena • Potsdam, New York		Grigals	L 2–4	2,421	1–5–0
October 29	3:07 PM	at #16 Cornell*		Lynah Rink • Ithaca, New York		Grigals	L 2–3 ^{OT}	3,198	1–6–0
October 30	3:07 PM	at #16 Cornell*		Lynah Rink • Ithaca, New York		Grigals	L 0–1 ^{OT}	2,864	1–7–0
November 19	7:07 PM	#9 Omaha*		Carlson Center • Fairbanks, Alaska		Grigals	L 2–5	2,253	1–8–0
November 20	7:07 PM	#9 Omaha*		Carlson Center • Fairbanks, Alaska		Grigals	L 2–4	1,832	1–9–0
November 26	4:07 PM	at #2 Minnesota Duluth*		AMSOIL Arena • Duluth, Minnesota		Grigals	L 1–5	5,012	1–10–0
November 27	4:07 PM	at #2 Minnesota Duluth*		AMSOIL Arena • Duluth, Minnesota		Allin	L 0–1 ^{OT}	4,786	1–11–0
December 10	7:07 PM	Rensselaer*		Carlson Center • Fairbanks, Alaska		Grigals	L 1–4	1,134	1–12–0
December 11	7:07 PM	Rensselaer*		Carlson Center • Fairbanks, Alaska		Grigals	W 4–0	1,325	2–12–0
December 14	7:07 PM	Rensselaer*		Carlson Center • Fairbanks, Alaska		Grigals	W 3–2	1,033	3–12–0
December 15	7:07 PM	Rensselaer*		Carlson Center • Fairbanks, Alaska		Grigals	W 4–1	1,205	4–12–0
December 31	5:07 PM	at #8 Denver*		Magness Arena • Denver, Colorado		Allin	L 2–7	4,176	4–13–0
January 1	4:07 PM	at #8 Denver*		Magness Arena • Denver, Colorado	Altitude 2	Grigals	T 4–4 ^{OT}	5,260	4–13–1
January 7	2:30 PM	at Maine*		Alfond Arena • Orono, Maine		Grigals	W 6–2	2,468	5–13–1
January 8	2:00 PM	at Maine*		Alfond Arena • Orono, Maine		Grigals	L 2–4	2,978	5–14–1
January 14	9:00 PM	at #8 Minnesota*		3M Arena at Mariucci • Minneapolis, Minnesota		Grigals	L 1–4	7,624	5–15–1
January 15	9:00 PM	at #8 Minnesota*		3M Arena at Mariucci • Minneapolis, Minnesota		Grigals	W 3–2	8,083	6–15–1
January 28	3:05 PM	at Vermont*		Gutterson Fieldhouse • Burlington, Vermont		Grigals	L 0–2	2,810	6–16–1
January 29	3:05 PM	at Vermont*		Gutterson Fieldhouse • Burlington, Vermont		Grigals	W 3–0	2,827	7–16–1
February 4	5:07 PM	at Arizona State*		Oceanside Ice Arena • Tempe, Arizona		Grigals	W 5–3	903	8–16–1
February 5	5:07 PM	at Arizona State*		Oceanside Ice Arena • Tempe, Arizona		Grigals	W 4–3	903	9–16–1
February 11	7:07 PM	St. Thomas*		Carlson Center • Fairbanks, Alaska		Grigals	W 6–1	1,650	10–16–1
February 12	7:07 PM	St. Thomas*		Carlson Center • Fairbanks, Alaska		Grigals	W 7–3	1,738	11–16–1
February 18	11:00 AM	at Long Island*		Northwell Health Ice Center • East Meadow, New York		Grigals	L 1–4	114	11–17–1
February 19	10:00 AM	at Long Island*		Northwell Health Ice Center • East Meadow, New York		Allin	W 4–3	32	12–17–1
February 25	7:07 PM	Arizona State*		Carlson Center • Fairbanks, Alaska		Grigals	W 3–2	1,525	13–17–1
February 26	7:07 PM	Arizona State*		Carlson Center • Fairbanks, Alaska		Grigals	T 1–1 ^{OT}	2,302	13–17–2
March 4	7:07 PM	Long Island*		Carlson Center • Fairbanks, Alaska		Grigals	L 3–2	2,134	13–18–2
March 5	7:07 PM	Long Island*		Carlson Center • Fairbanks, Alaska		Grigals	W 5–1	2,297	14–18–2
March 9	3:05 PM	at USNTDP*		USA Hockey Arena • Plymouth, Michigan (Exhibition)		Allin	L 2–5	568	
*Non-conference game. ^{#}Rankings from USCHO.com Poll. All times are in Alaska Time. Source:

== Scoring statistics ==
Name	Position	Games	Goals	Assists	Points	PIM
Filip Fornåå Svensson	C/RW	34	9	16	25	12
Brady Risk	F	31	10	14	24	27
Didrik Henbrant	RW	34	11	9	20	37
Garrett Pyke	F/D	34	4	16	20	46
Antti Virtanen	D	30	3	16	19	28
Anton Rubtsov	F	24	9	8	17	16
Chase Dubois	F	26	5	7	12	2
Harrison Israels	C/LW	29	4	8	12	2
Matt Koethe	F	30	2	8	10	20
Roberts Kaļķis	D	33	3	6	9	33
Jordan Muzzillo	D	34	1	7	8	44
Arvils Bergmanis	D	34	1	7	8	26
Markuss Komuls	D	31	3	4	7	4
Caleb Hite	F	29	1	6	7	6
Connor Mylymok	LW	18	3	3	6	32
Simon Falk	C/RW	24	3	3	6	6
Ēriks Žohovs	C	24	3	3	6	17
Payton Matsui	F	26	3	3	6	6
Colin Doyle	C	25	3	2	5	33
Jakob Breault	C	18	3	1	4	42
Brayden Nicholetts	F	15	2	1	3	10
Kristaps Jākobsons	D	16	1	1	2	8
Riley Murphy	F	16	0	2	2	22
Roberts Bļugers	LW/RW	2	0	1	1	0
Matthew McKim	LW	6	0	1	1	0
Antonio Di Paolo	D	3	0	0	0	4
Nátán Vertes	RW	4	0	0	0	15
Daniel Allin	G	6	0	0	0	0
Karl Falk	D	12	0	0	0	4
Gustavs Dāvis Grigals	G	31	0	0	0	2
Total			87	152	239	516

== Goaltending statistics ==
Name	Games	Minutes	Wins	Losses	Ties	Goals against	Saves	Shut outs	SV %	GAA
Gustavs Dāvis Grigals	31	1792	13	15	2	72	819	2	.919	2.41
Daniel Allin	6	243	1	3	0	16	104	0	.867	3.95
Empty Net	-	21	-	-	-	7	-	-	-	-
Total	34	2056	14	18	2	95	923	2	.907	2.77

== Rankings ==
Poll	Week																									
Poll	Pre	1	2	3	4	5	6	7	8	9	10	11	12	13	14	15	16	17	18	19	20	21	22	23	24	25 (Final)
USCHO.com	NR	NR	NR	NR	NR	NR	NR	NR	NR	NR	NR	NR	NR	NR	NR	NR	NR	NR	NR	NR	NR	NR	NR	NR	-	NR
USA Today	NR	NR	NR	NR	NR	NR	NR	NR	NR	NR	NR	NR	NR	NR	NR	NR	NR	NR	NR	NR	NR	NR	NR	NR	NR	NR

Note: USCHO did not release a poll in week 24.
