= Bobby Brink =

American ice hockey player (born 2001)

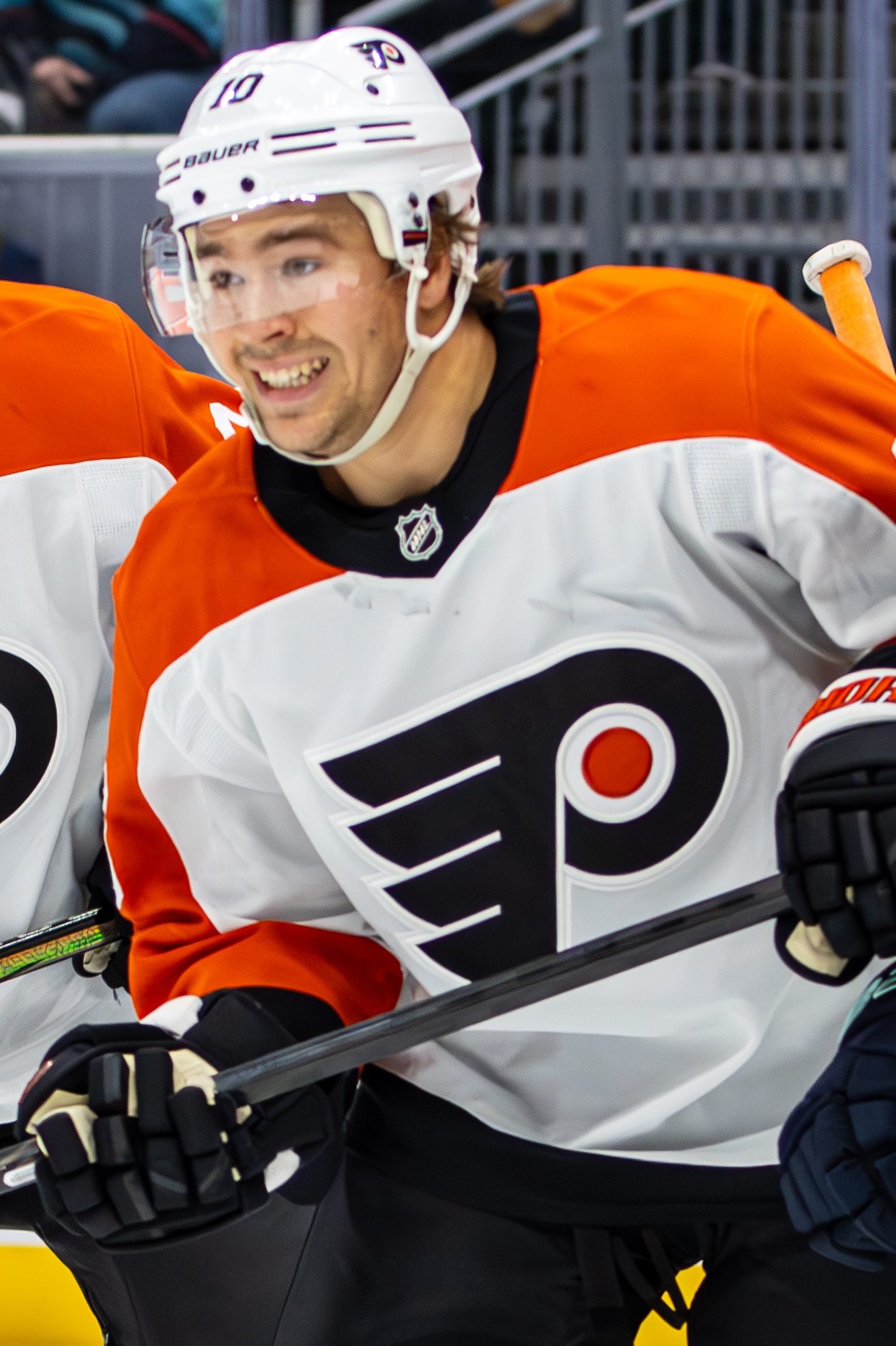
- Brink with the Flyers in 2024
- Born: July 8, 2001 (age 25) Minnetonka, Minnesota, U.S.
- Height: 5 ft 8 in (173 cm)
- Weight: 169 lb (77 kg; 12 st 1 lb)
- Position: Right wing
- Shoots: Right
- NHL team Former teams: Minnesota Wild; Philadelphia Flyers
- NHL draft: 34th overall, 2019; Philadelphia Flyers
- Playing career: 2022–present

Bobby Orr Brink (born July 8, 2001) is an American professional ice hockey player who is a right winger for the Minnesota Wild of the National Hockey League (NHL). He previously played for the Philadelphia Flyers of the NHL. The Flyers selected Brink in the second round, with the 34th overall pick, of the 2019 NHL entry draft. Brink has also represented the United States men's national junior ice hockey team at two IIHF World Junior Championships.

Raised in Minnetonka, Minnesota, Brink helped take Minnetonka High School to its first ice hockey championship in 2018. The next year, he was named the United States Hockey League (USHL) Forward of the Year for his 68-point season with the Sioux City Musketeers. From there, Brink spent three years with the Denver Pioneers. His college ice hockey career culminated with an NCAA tournament championship, the NCAA scoring title, and the NCHC Player of the Year award in 2022. Brink made his NHL debut in 2022, but injury and inconsistency relegated him to the American Hockey League (AHL) for long stretches until the 2024–25 season.

== Early life ==
Bobby Orr Brink was born July 8, 2001, in Minnetonka, Minnesota, to Andy and Holly Brink. His father, a former college ice hockey player for the Minnesota Golden Gophers, was a minor ice hockey coach in Minnesota, and as a child, Brink would accompany his father to the ice rink. There, he had the opportunity to skate with his father's students, including future National Hockey League (NHL) player Mike Reilly. In addition to ice hockey, Brink also played lacrosse and golf as an adolescent. In 2018, Brink led Minnetonka High School to its first ice hockey state championship. That year, he had 21 goals and a team-leading 56 points in 31 games, including five goals in three state tournament games.

After the 2018 high school hockey season ended, Brink began his junior ice hockey career with the Sioux City Musketeers of the United States Hockey League (USHL). There, he put up two goals and four points in 13 games of the 2017–18 season. Although he missed several games of the 2018–19 season with a fractured foot, Brink recorded 35 goals and 68 points in his first full season with Sioux City. He was awarded the 2019 USHL Forward of the Year award for his performance and was named to the league's first all-star team.

== Playing career ==
=== College ===
After two seasons with the Musketeers, Brink entered college a year early, joining the Denver Pioneers for the 2019–20 season. He recorded his first collegiate goal in his Pioneers debut, a 4–3 win over the Alaska Nanooks on October 5. During his freshman season, Brink received National Collegiate Hockey Conference (NCHC) Rookie of the Month honors twice: in October, for recording six points in as many games; and in January, when he led all conference rookies with nine points in eight games. Brink missed time at the end of the season with two separate injuries: a strained medial collateral ligament and a cut on his ankle from a skate blade. He finished his rookie season with 11 goals and 24 points in 28 games, and he was unanimously selected to the NCHC All-Rookie Team at forward.

With his freshman season unexpectedly interrupted by the impact of the COVID-19 pandemic on ice hockey and other athletics, Brink spent the 2020 offseason practicing his skating at a local rink. He worked closely with professional figure skater Kathleen Gazich to improve his skating mechanics in preparation for the pandemic-delayed 2020–21 season. That year, Brink was limited to 15 of a possible 24 games due to injury, COVID, and his participation in an international tournament. When he did play, he struggled to score, recording only two goals and 11 points on a Pioneers team that failed to qualify for the 2021 NCAA Division I men's ice hockey tournament.

Going into the 2021–22 season, Brink was named an alternate captain of the Pioneers, serving behind captain Cole Guttman. By January 13, Brink had set career highs with 19 assists and 26 points, and he was nominated for the Hobey Baker Award as the top men's college ice hockey player of the year. After a month during which he recorded 15 points in eight games, Brink was named both the NCHC and National Player of the Month for February. Brink finished his junior season with 14 goals and 57 points in 41 games, becoming Denver's first NCAA Scoring Champion since Ed Beers in 1982. In addition to being named the NCHC Player of the Year and Forward of the Year, Brink was unanimously selected to the 2022 All-NCHC First Team and was recognized as an AHCA First Team All-American. He was a top-three finalist for the Hobey Baker Award, finishing behind Dryden McKay. Brink concluded his college ice hockey career as a 2022 NCAA Division I men's ice hockey tournament champion, as Denver defeated the Minnesota State Mavericks by a 5–1 final score. In three seasons with the Pioneers, Brink recorded 27 goals and 92 points in 84 games.

=== Professional ===
==== Philadelphia Flyers (2022–2026) ====
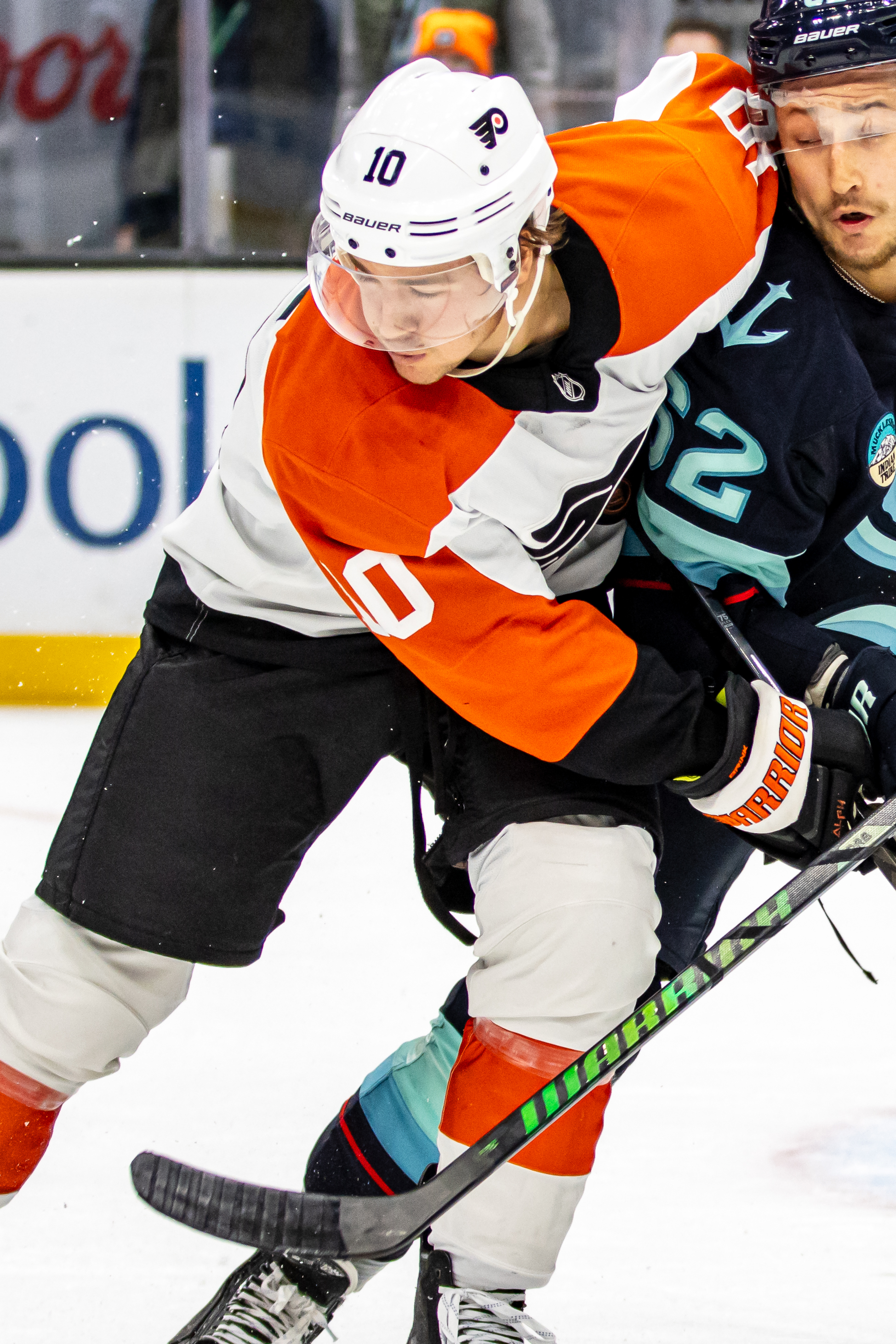
Brink with the Flyers in 2024

The Philadelphia Flyers of the National Hockey League (NHL) selected Brink in the second round, 34th overall, of the 2019 NHL entry draft. On April 10, 2022, the day after winning a national championship with Denver, Brink signed a three-year entry-level contract with the Flyers. He joined the team immediately, making his NHL debut on April 12 against the Washington Capitals. Brink recorded his first professional point in his debut, assisting on James van Riemsdyk's third-period goal during the 9–2 loss. Appearing in 10 games to close out the 2021–22 season, Brink assisted on four goals for the Flyers.

While training in preparation for the 2022–23 season, Brink tore his left acetabular labrum, requiring surgery and sidelining him for the start of the year. He returned to play on January 3 and was assigned to the Lehigh Valley Phantoms, Philadelphia's American Hockey League (AHL) affiliate, to continue his adjustment to professional hockey. It was difficult for Brink to build stamina and return to his pre-injury form during his time with the Phantoms. Coach Ian Laperrière praised Brink's "hockey IQ and the skills that he's got", which allowed him to navigate his subdued physical capabilities. Brink spent the entire season in Lehigh Valley, as the Flyers did not want to disrupt his progress, and finished the regular season with 12 goals and 28 points in 41 AHL games. Brink also appeared in three playoff games with the Phantoms, recording one assist in the process.

Considered unlikely to begin the 2023–24 season in the NHL, Brink impressed the Flyers during the preseason and was named to the opening-night roster. He scored his first two NHL goals on October 26, during Philadelphia's 6–2 win over the Minnesota Wild. After starting the season with six goals and 17 points through 29 games, Brink's quality of play declined by mid-January. On January 22, following a seven-game pointless streak and three healthy scratches in a row, Brink was demoted to Lehigh Valley to continue his development. After 11 games with the Phantoms, during which he posted six goals and 11 points, Brink returned to the Flyers on February 27. After putting up 11 goals and 23 points in 57 games for the Flyers, Brink was sent to Lehigh again on April 17, this time to push the Phantoms towards the 2024 Calder Cup playoffs. He scored in the Phantoms' regular-season finale, a 3–0 victory over the Bridgeport Islanders to clinch a playoff position, and added four assists in six postseason games.

Prior to the 2024–25 season, the Flyers signed Brink to a two-year, $3 million contract extension. Building on his previous season, Brink told reporters that he wanted to increase his confidence and consistency as a two-way player the coming year. By December, Brink had found success on a line with Noah Cates and Tyson Foerster, as the trio scored a combined 25 points in their first 15 games together. By the end of February, Brink had played more minutes with Cates and Foerster than any other forward line combination on the Flyers. He attributed the trio's success to their predictability, as he could anticipate how his teammates would react during plays. By March, Brink had earned Tortorella's trust and received time on both the power play and penalty kill units. Tortorella particularly praised Brink's improved checking, which had been a point of contention the year prior. Brink finished the season with 12 goals and a career-high 41 points in 79 games, and he received the Pelle Lindbergh Memorial Trophy as the most improved Flyer of the season.

Under new coach Rick Tocchet, Brink began the 2025–26 season with three goals and seven points in his first nine games, and he received praise from captain Sean Couturier as "a complete player". On January 6, Brink left the Flyers' game against the Anaheim Ducks following a high hit from Jansen Harkins. He missed six games with a concussion, returning for Philadelphia's January 20 game against the Vegas Golden Knights. In 55 games with the Flyers that season, Brink scored 13 goals and recorded 26 points.

==== Minnesota Wild (2026–present) ====
On March 6, 2026, the Flyers traded Brink to the Minnesota Wild in exchange for David Jiříček. He signed a one-year, $2.75 million contract with the Wild on June 30.

== International play ==
Medal record

Representing United States

Ice hockey

World Junior Championships
Gold medal – first place	2021 Canada	

World U18 Championships
Bronze medal – third place	2019 Sweden	

World Junior A Challenge
Gold medal – first place	2018 Alberta	

Brink made his international debut with the USA Hockey National Team Development Program at the 2018 World Junior A Challenge. After fracturing his ankle blocking a shot during the semifinal round, Brink scored in the championship, a 2–0 win over Team Russia, to take his team to a gold medal. Brink's eight points were tied for the tournament lead, and he received both MVP and All-Star Team honors. The following year, Brink joined Team USA again for the 2019 IIHF World U18 Championships in Sweden. He recorded three goals and six points in five tournament games, including a goal in Team USA's bronze-medal victory over Team Canada.

Brink joined the United States men's national junior ice hockey team for the 2020 World Junior Ice Hockey Championships in the Czech Republic. There, he posted one goal and one assist in five games as Team USA failed to medal, losing 1–0 to Team Finland in the quarterfinals. Brink returned to the team the following year for the 2021 World Junior Ice Hockey Championships in Canada. There, he recorded two goals and six points in seven games en route to a gold medal.

== Career statistics ==
=== Regular season and playoffs ===
			Regular season					Playoffs
Season	Team	League	GP	G	A	Pts	PIM	GP	G	A	Pts	PIM
2017–18	Sioux City Musketeers	USHL	12	2	2	4	4	—	—	—	—	—
2018–19	Sioux City Musketeers	USHL	43	35	33	68	22	—	—	—	—	—
2019–20	University of Denver	NCHC	28	11	13	24	12	—	—	—	—	—
2020–21	University of Denver	NCHC	15	2	9	11	4	—	—	—	—	—
2021–22	University of Denver	NCHC	41	14	43	57	44	—	—	—	—	—
2021–22	Philadelphia Flyers	NHL	10	0	4	4	0	—	—	—	—	—
2022–23	Lehigh Valley Phantoms	AHL	41	12	16	28	15	3	0	1	1	2
2023–24	Philadelphia Flyers	NHL	57	11	12	23	10	—	—	—	—	—
2023–24	Lehigh Valley Phantoms	AHL	13	7	6	13	2	6	0	4	4	4
2024–25	Philadelphia Flyers	NHL	79	12	29	41	22	—	—	—	—	—
2025–26	Philadelphia Flyers	NHL	55	13	13	26	20	—	—	—	—	—
2025–26	Minnesota Wild	NHL	13	2	2	4	4	4	0	1	1	4
NHL totals			214	38	60	98	56	4	0	1	1	4

=== International ===
Year	Team	Event	Result	GP	G	A	Pts	PIM
2018	United States	WJAC	1st place, gold medalist(s)	6	2	6	8	2
2019	United States	U18	3rd place, bronze medalist(s)	5	3	3	6	6
2020	United States	WJC	6th	5	1	1	2	0
2021	United States	WJC	1st place, gold medalist(s)	7	2	4	6	2
Junior totals				12	3	5	8	2

== Awards and honors ==
Award	Year(s)	Ref.
USHL
Forward of the Year	2019	
All-USHL First Team	2019	
College
All-NCHC Rookie Team	2020	
All-NCHC First Team	2022	
Division I AHCA All-American First Team (West)	2022	
NCAA Scoring Champion	2022	
NCHC Forward of the Year	2022	
NCHC Player of the Year	2022	
IIHF
World Junior A Challenge All-Star Team	2018	
World Junior A Challenge Most Valuable Player	2018	

Awards and achievements
Preceded by Shane Pinto	NCHC Forward of the Year; 2021–22	Succeeded by Jason Polin
Preceded by Shane Pinto	NCHC Player of the Year; 2021–22	Succeeded by Jason Polin
Preceded by Cole Caufield	NCAA Ice Hockey Scoring Champion; 2021–22	Succeeded by Adam Fantilli
