= 2021–22 NCHC season =

- Season: 2021–22
- Conference: NCHC
- Division: Division I
- Sport: ice hockey
- Duration: October 2, 2021– April 9, 2022
- Number of teams: 8

2022 NHL Entry Draft
- Top draft pick: Victor Mancini
- Picked by: New York Rangers

Regular season
- Season champions: Denver; North Dakota
- Season MVP: Bobby Brink
- Top scorer: Bobby Brink

NCHC Tournament
- Tournament champions: Minnesota Duluth
- Runners-up: Western Michigan
- Tournament MVP: Ryan Fanti
- Top scorer: Koby Bender (6)

NCAA tournament
- Bids: 5
- Record: 6–4
- Best Finish: NCAA Champion
- Team(s): Denver

The 2021–22 NCHC season was the 9th season of play for the National Collegiate Hockey Conference and took place during the 2021–22 NCAA Division I men's ice hockey season. The regular season began on October 2, 2021, and concluded on March 5, 2022. The conference tournament began on March 11, 2022 and concluded on March 19, 2022.

== Coaches ==
Kris Mayotte was named as Colorado College's 15th head coach shortly after the end of their 20–21 season.

Pat Ferschweiler was promoted to head coach after the retirement of Andy Murray.

=== Records ===
Team	Head coach	Season at school	Record at school	NCHC record
Colorado College	Kris Mayotte	1	0–0–0	0–0–0
Denver	David Carle	4	55–34–12	31–31–9
Miami	Chris Bergeron	3	13–39–7	10–34–5
Minnesota Duluth	Scott Sandelin	22	406–332–91	107–69–17
North Dakota	Brad Berry	7	138–63–24	85–46–14
Omaha	Mike Gabinet	5	54–69–9	37–52–7
St. Cloud State	Brett Larson	4	63–32–9	44–23–5
Western Michigan	Pat Ferschweiler	1	0–0–0	0–0–0

== Standings ==
2021–22 National Collegiate Hockey Conference Standings
	Conference record										Overall record					
	GP	W	L	T	OTW	OTL	3/SW	PTS	GF	GA	GP	W	L	T	GF	GA
#1 Denver †	24	18	6	0	1	0	0	53	98	55	41	31	9	1	175	93
#9 North Dakota †	24	17	6	1	1	1	1	53	78	58	39	24	14	1	119	99
#6 Western Michigan	24	14	9	1	1	0	1	43	84	68	39	26	12	1	138	101
#11 St. Cloud State	24	10	10	4	1	2	1	36	84	69	37	18	15	4	133	97
#5 Minnesota Duluth *	24	10	10	4	1	1	2	36	61	56	42	22	16	4	109	93
Omaha	24	11	13	0	2	1	0	32	65	74	38	21	17	0	123	102
Colorado College	24	6	17	1	2	1	0	18	48	87	36	9	24	3	79	116
Miami	24	4	19	1	0	3	1	17	54	105	36	7	27	2	94	153
Championship: March 19, 2022 † indicates conference regular season champion (Penrose Cup) * indicates conference tournament champion (Frozen Faceoff Championship Trophy); Rankings: USCHO.com Top 20 Poll

== Non-Conference record ==
Of the sixteen teams that are selected to participate in the NCAA tournament, ten will be via at-large bids. Those 10 teams are determined based upon the PairWise rankings. The rankings take into account all games played but are heavily affected by intra-conference results. The result is that teams from leagues which perform better in non-conference are much more likely to receive at-large bids even if they possess inferior records overall.

NCHC had a strong showing against non-conference opponents. As a whole, the league won a majority of their games against every other conference but one (tied with ECAC). While three member teams finished with losing records, the other five more than balanced out the scales. The NCHC also played a good number of games against highly ranked opponents. While the results in those games was about even, the bonus the teams received from those matches helped put five league members into the NCAA tournament.

=== Regular season record ===
Team	Atlantic Hockey	Big Ten	CCHA	ECAC Hockey	Hockey East	Independent	Total
Colorado College	1–1–0	0–0–0	0–0–0	0–2–2	1–1–0	1–1–0	3–5–2
Denver	3–0–1	0–0–0	0–0–0	0–0–0	0–2–0	4–0–0	7–2–1
Miami	1–1–0	0–2–0	1–2–1	0–0–0	0–0–0	1–1–0	3–6–1
Minnesota Duluth	0–0–0	2–1–0	2–4–0	0–0–0	1–0–0	2–0–0	7–5–0
North Dakota	2–0–0	1–2–0	1–1–0	1–3–0	0–0–0	0–0–0	5–6–0
Omaha	0–0–0	0–0–0	1–1–0	1–1–0	2–0–0	6–0–0	10–2–0
St. Cloud State	0–0–0	3–1–0	5–1–0	0–0–0	0–0–0	0–0–0	8–2–0
Western Michigan	0–0–0	2–1–0	2–0–0	4–0–0	0–0–0	0–0–0	8–1–0
Overall	7–2–1	8–7–0	12–9–1	6–6–2	4–3–0	14–2–0	51–29–4

== Statistics ==
=== Leading scorers ===
GP = Games played; G = Goals; A = Assists; Pts = Points; PIM = Penalties in minutes

Player	Class	Team	GP	G	A	Pts	PIM
Bobby Brink	Junior	Denver	24	9	26	35	18
Carter Savoie	Sophomore	Denver	24	13	12	25	23
Kevin Fitzgerald	Graduate	St. Cloud State	24	12	13	25	16
Drew Worrad	Senior	Western Michigan	24	4	21	25	12
Cole Guttman	Senior	Denver	24	11	13	24	18
Carter Mazur	Freshman	Denver	24	10	14	24	28
Riese Gaber	Sophomore	North Dakota	19	9	14	23	10
Ethen Frank	Graduate	Western Michigan	23	16	7	23	12
Nick Perbix	Senior	St. Cloud State	18	4	18	22	10
Michael Benning	Sophomore	Denver	24	8	13	21	8
Taylor Ward	Senior	Omaha	24	8	13	21	27
Michael Joyaux	Senior	Western Michigan	24	8	13	21	21
Ronnie Attard	Junior	Western Michigan	24	8	13	21	16

=== Leading goaltenders ===
Minimum 1/3 of team's minutes played in conference games.
GP = Games played; Min = Minutes played; W = Wins; L = Losses; T = Ties; GA = Goals against; SO = Shutouts; SV% = Save percentage; GAA = Goals against average

Player	Class	Team	GP	Min	W	L	T	GA	SO	SV%	GAA
Ryan Fanti	Junior	Minnesota Duluth	23	1360	9	9	4	48	3	.917	2.12
Magnus Chrona	Junior	Denver	22	1279	16	6	0	46	6	.907	2.16
Zach Driscoll	Senior	North Dakota	20	1135	15	4	0	41	1	.919	2.17
Dávid Hrenák	Graduate	St. Cloud State	23	1299	10	9	4	56	2	.904	2.59
Brandon Bussi	Junior	Western Michigan	24	1432	14	9	1	67	3	.911	2.81

== Conference tournament ==
Teams are reseeded for the Semifinals

Quarterfinals; March 11–13
1	Denver	5	5	-
8	Miami	2	1	-
2	North Dakota	2	2	-
7	Colorado College	1	1	-
(Pairings are reseeded after the first round)
3	Western Michigan	4	5*	-
6	Omaha	2	4	-
4	St. Cloud State	2	3	-
5	Minnesota Duluth	5	4*	-

Semifinals; March 18
1	Denver	0
5	Minnesota Duluth	2
2	North Dakota	2
3	Western Michigan	4

Championship; March 19
5	Minnesota Duluth	3
3	Western Michigan	0

* denotes overtime periods

== NCAA tournament ==
=== Regional semifinal ===
==== Midwest ====
March 25, 2022; 8:00 PM	(2) Quinnipiac	5 – 4 (2–0, 1–3, 2–1)	(3) St. Cloud State	PPL Center; Attendance: 2,155

Game reference

Yaniv Perets
Goalies
Jaxon Castor
Referees:
Ryan Sweeney
Mike Schubert
Linesmen:
Anthony Valle
Shane Kanaly

(Metsa, Brind'Amour) Brendan Less (4) – 04:37	1–0
(Rasanen) TJ Friedmann (10) – 17:26	2–0
	2–1	21:08 – Nolan Walker (10) (Hentges)
	2–2	27:21 – Sam Hentges (12) (Walker)
(de Jong, Metsa) Michael Lombardi (14) – 30:12	3–2
	3–3	32:39 – Kyler Kupka (19) (Bushy, Fitzgerald)
(Mendel, Chorney) Ethan de Jong (11) – 40:27	4–3
(Mendel, de Jong) Jayden Lee (5) – GW – 48:37	5–3
	5–4	58:44 – EA – Nolan Walker (19) (unassisted)

2 min
Penalties
0 min
16
Shots
34

==== East ====
March 24, 2022; 6:00 PM	(2) North Dakota	1 – 2 (OT) (1–0, 0–1, 0–0, 0–1)	(3) Notre Dame	MVP Arena; Attendance: 2,345

Game reference

Zach Driscoll
Goalies
Matthew Galajda
Referees:
Geno Binda Jr.
Jeremy Tufts
Linesmen:
Kevin Briganti
Bill Kingdon

(Ness) Brent Johnson (2) – 18:43	1–0
	1–1	21:03 – Landon Slaggert (12) (G. Slaggert)
	1–2	61:38 – GW PP – Graham Slaggert (12) (Leivermann, L. Slaggert)

6 min
Penalties
6 min
24
Shots
25

==== Northeast ====
March 25, 2022; 12:00 PM	(1) Western Michigan	2 – 1 (OT) (1–0, 0–0, 0–1, 1–0)	(4) Northeastern	DCU Center; Attendance: 6,002

Game reference

Brandon Bussi
Goalies
Devon Levi
Referees:
Brendan Blanchard
Chris Leavitt
Linesmen:
Brendan Lewis
Matt Terreri

(Worrad, Frank) Cole Gallant (9) – 14:01	1–0
	1–1	56:40 – Aidan McDonough (25) (Colangelo)
(unassisted) Luke Grainger (9) – GW – 61:33	2–1

2 min
Penalties
6 min
36
Shots
31

==== West ====
March 24, 2022; 7:00 PM	(1) Denver	3 – 2 (1–1, 0–0, 2–1)	(4) Massachusetts Lowell	Budweiser Events Center; Attendance: 3,138

Game reference

Magnus Chrona
Goalies
Owen Savory
Referees:
Tony Czech
Kenny Anderson
Linesmen:
Sam Shikowsky
Nicholas Bradshaw

	0–1	09:42 – Lucas Condotta (10) (Stefanson, Korencik)
(Lee, Tuomisto) Brett Stapley (16) – 18:36	1–1
(Benning) Carter Savoie (21) – 49:26	2–1
	2–2	54:21 – Connor Sodergren (7) (McDonald, Crasa)
(Mazur) Cameron Wright (21) – GW – 57:03	3–2

19 min
Penalties
10 min
28
Shots
18

March 24, 2022; 1:00 PM	(2) Minnesota Duluth	3 – 0 (1–0, 0–0, 2–0)	(3) Michigan Tech	Budweiser Events Center; Attendance: 3,138

Game reference

Ryan Fanti
Goalies
Blake Pietila
Referees:
Colin Kronforst
Sean Fernandez
Linesmen:
Justin Cornell
Pat Richardson

(unassisted) Kobe Roth (17) – GW – 14:54	1–0
(unassisted) Kyler Kleven (3) – 46:09	2–0
(unassisted) Kobe Roth (18) – EN – 59:53	3–0

8 min
Penalties
15 min
25
Shots
28

=== Regional final ===
==== Northeast ====
March 27, 2022; 4:00 PM	(1) Western Michigan	0 – 3 (0–1, 0–0, 0–2)	(2) Minnesota	DCU Center; Attendance: 2,848

Game reference

Brandon Bussi
Goalies
Justen Close
Referees:
Joe Carusone
C.J. Hanfin
Linesmen:
Brian Oliver
Ryan Knapp

0–1	10:10 – GW – Matthew Knies (14) (Faber, Meyers)
0–2	40:33 – PP – Aaron Huglen (7) (Meyers, LaCombe)
0–3	58:03 – SH EN – Blake McLaughlin (13) (unassisted)

2 min
Penalties
4 min
24
Shots
26

==== West ====
March 26, 2022; 2:00 PM	(1) Denver	2 – 1 (1–1, 0–0, 1–0)	(2) Minnesota Duluth	Budweiser Events Center; Attendance: 4,812

Game reference

Magnus Chrona
Goalies
Ryan Fanti
Referees:
Colin Kronforst
Sean Fernandez
Linesmen:
Justin Cornell
Pat Richardson

	0–1	14:40 – Darian Gotz (2) (Roth, Bender)
(Brink) Cole Guttman (19) – 17:24	1–1
(Behrens, Guttman) Carter Savoie (22) – GW – 53:44	2–1

8 min
Penalties
8 min
34
Shots
25

=== National semifinal ===
April 7, 2022; 5:00 PM	(MW1) Michigan	2 – 3 (OT) (0–1, 1–0, 1–1, 0–1)	(W1) Denver	TD Garden; Attendance: 17,850

Game reference

Erik Portillo
Goalies
Magnus Chrona
Referees:
Joe Carusone
CJ Hanafin
Linesmen:
Ryan Knapp
Brian Oliver

	0–1	11:22 – Brett Stapley (17) (Barrow, Lee)
(Moyle, Van Wyhe) Jimmy Lambert (6) – 24:03	1–1
	1–2	45:36 – Cameron Wright (22) (Benning, Rizzo)
(Pastujov, Estapa) Thomas Bordeleau (12) – 49:09	2–2
	2–3	74:53 – GW – Carter Savoie (23) (Brink, Benning)

6 min
Penalties
0 min
21
Shots
33

=== National championship ===
April 9, 2022; 8:00 PM	(E1) Minnesota State	1–5 (1–0, 0–0, 0–5)	(W1) Denver	TD Garden; Attendance: 17,850

Game reference
Referees: Geno Binda Jr. Jeremy Tufts; Linesmen: Bill Kingdon; Kevin Briganti

Scoring summary
Period	Team	Goal	Assist(s)	Time	Score
1st	MSU	Sam Morton (9) – PP	Sowder and Sandelin	13:59	1–0 MSU
2nd	None				
3rd	DEN	Ryan Barrow (8)	Benning and Devine	44:46	1–1
3rd	DEN	Michael Benning (15) – GW	Buium and Wright	47:33	2–1 DEN
3rd	DEN	Massimo Rizzo (12)	Mazur and Lee	53:34	3–1 DEN
3rd	DEN	Brett Stapley (18) – EN	unassisted	57:28	4–1 DEN
3rd	DEN	Cameron Wright (23) – EN	Mazur	58:00	5–1 DEN
Penalty summary
Period	Team	Player	Penalty	Time	PIM
1st	DEN	Michael Benning	Tripping	12:23	2:00
1st	MSU	Nathan Smith	Roughing	15:28	2:00
2nd	MSU	Bench	Too Many Men	27:07	2:00
3rd	MSU	Sam Morton	Tripping	45:26	2:00

Shots by period
Team	1	2	3	T
Denver	3	5	12	20
Minnesota State	8	10	10	28

Goaltenders
Team	Name	Saves	Goals against	Time on ice
DEN	Magnus Chrona	27	1	60:00
MSU	Dryden McKay	15	3	58:22

== Ranking ==
=== USCHO ===
Team	Pre	1	2	3	4	5	6	7	8	9	10	11	12	13	14	15	16	17	18	19	20	21	22	23	Final
Colorado College	NR	NR	NR	NR	NR	NR	NR	NR	NR	NR	NR	NR	NR	NR	NR	NR	NR	NR	NR	NR	NR	NR	NR	NR	NR
Denver	13	12	11	8	11	11	14	11	12	12	11	8	7	6	5	5	4	3	3	3	3	3	3	3	1
Miami	NR	NR	NR	NR	NR	NR	NR	NR	NR	NR	NR	NR	NR	NR	NR	NR	NR	NR	NR	NR	NR	NR	NR	NR	NR
Minnesota Duluth	6	5	5	5	4	4	4	4	2	1	5	6	8	7	7	7	6	6	7	8	11	10	8	6	5
North Dakota	8	8	7	6	6	8	7	6	6	7	7	5	5	10	9	13	12	12	9	7	4	5	5	7	9
Omaha	17	17	13	11	10	9	11	9	9	10	14	14	15	15	16	16	18	18	NR	NR	20	19	NR	NR	NR
St. Cloud State	2	2	2	3	1	1	1	2	5	5	6	7	4	5	6	6	7	10	8	11	10	9	12	11	11
Western Michigan	NR	NR	19	17	13	10	9	13	7	6	4	4	3	3	4	3	5	5	6	6	8	7	7	4	6

=== USA Today ===
Team	Pre	1	2	3	4	5	6	7	8	9	10	11	12	13	14	15	16	17	18	19	20	21	22	23	24	Final
Colorado College	NR	NR	NR	NR	NR	NR	NR	NR	NR	NR	NR	NR	NR	NR	NR	NR	NR	NR	NR	NR	NR	NR	NR	NR	NR	NR
Denver	NR	13	11	8	12	13	NR	12	11	11	10	8	6	6	6	5	3	3	3	3	3	3	2	4	3	1
Miami	NR	NR	NR	NR	NR	NR	NR	NR	NR	NR	NR	NR	NR	NR	NR	NR	NR	NR	NR	NR	NR	NR	NR	NR	NR	NR
Minnesota Duluth	6	5	5	5	4	3	4	4	2	1	5	5	8	7	7	7	7	6	7	9	10	10	8	3	6	5
North Dakota	7	7	6	6	6	10	7	6	5	7	7	5	5	11	10	13	11	12	10	7	5	5	5	8	9	9
Omaha	NR	15	14	11	9	7	11	10	9	10	14	15	15	NR	NR	NR	NR	NR	NR	NR	NR	NR	NR	NR	NR	NR
St. Cloud State	3	1	2	3	1	1	1	2	6	6	6	7	4	4	5	6	6	10	8	11	11	9	10	11	11	11
Western Michigan	NR	NR	NR	NR	11	11	10	13	7	5	4	4	3	3	3	3	5	5	5	6	8	7	7	5	5	6

=== Pairwise ===
Team	1	2	3	4	5	6	7	8	9	10	11	12	13	14	15	16	17	18	19	20	21	22	Final
Colorado College	14	48	52	46	44	47	39	39	41	38	39	35	32	33	35	34	39	39	41	41	42	43	45
Denver	14	20	3	13	21	37	9	4	8	5	3	2	5	2	3	3	3	3	3	3	3	3	4
Miami	8	34	46	40	41	41	41	42	46	46	44	45	44	46	49	49	50	45	43	43	45	43	46
Minnesota Duluth	14	25	6	3	3	1	1	1	1	1	5	8	7	8	8	9	7	5	8	11	11	9	4
North Dakota	14	25	14	5	19	8	4	2	3	5	3	2	11	10	13	12	12	10	6	5	6	6	7
Omaha	9	11	8	16	13	15	20	11	11	18	15	13	18	22	20	18	19	22	22	21	18	21	23
St. Cloud State	2	8	4	4	2	2	3	8	7	8	8	4	3	4	6	5	10	8	10	9	6	10	10
Western Michigan	14	23	42	1	1	3	6	4	3	1	7	4	3	4	3	3	3	3	3	5	5	5	3

Note: teams ranked in the top-10 automatically qualify for the NCAA tournament. Teams ranked 11-16 can qualify based upon conference tournament results.

== Awards ==
=== NCAA ===
Award		Recipient
Lowes' Senior CLASS Award		Zach Driscoll, North Dakota
AHCA All-American Teams
West First Team	Position	Team
Ronnie Attard	D	Western Michigan
Jake Sanderson	D	North Dakota
Bobby Brink	F	Denver
West Second Team	Position	Team
Ryan Fanti	G	Minnesota Duluth
Ethen Frank	F	Western Michigan

=== NCHC ===
Award		Recipient
Player of the Year		Bobby Brink, Denver
Rookie of the Year		Carter Mazur, Denver
Goaltender of the Year		Ryan Fanti, Minnesota Duluth
Forward of the Year		Bobby Brink, Denver
Defensive Defenseman of the Year		Ethan Frisch, North Dakota
Offensive Defenseman of the Year		Ronnie Attard, Western Michigan
Defensive Forward of the Year		Connor Ford, North Dakota
Scholar-Athlete of the Year		Drew Worrad, Western Michigan
Three Stars Award		Magnus Chrona, Denver
Sportsmanship Award		Mark Senden, North Dakota
Herb Brooks Coach of the Year		Brad Berry, North Dakota
Frozen Faceoff MVP		Ryan Fanti, Minnesota Duluth
All-NCHC Teams
First Team	Position	Second Team
Ryan Fanti, Minnesota Duluth	G	Zach Driscoll, North Dakota
Ronnie Attard, Western Michigan	D	Jake Sanderson, North Dakota
Nick Perbix, St. Cloud State	D	Michael Benning, Denver
Bobby Brink, Denver	F	Carter Savoie, Denver
Ethen Frank, Western Michigan	F	Drew Worrad, Western Michigan
Riese Gaber, North Dakota	F	Kevin Fitzgerald, St. Cloud State
Honorable Mention	Position	Rookie Team
Magnus Chrona, Denver	G	Jakob Hellsten, North Dakota
Brandon Scanlin, Omaha	D	Sean Behrens, Denver
Michael Joyaux, Western Michigan	D	Shai Buium, Denver
Cole Guttman, Denver	F	Carter Mazur, Denver
Noah Cates, Minnesota Duluth	F	Massimo Rizzo, Denver
Connor Ford, North Dakota	F	Matteo Costantini, North Dakota

=== NCHC Tournament ===
Tournament MVP
Ryan Fanti		Minnesota Duluth
Frozen Faceoff All-Tournament Team
Player	Pos	Team
Ryan Fanti	G	Minnesota Duluth
Ronnie Attard	D	Western Michigan
Wyatt Kaiser	D	Minnesota Duluth
Blake Biondi	F	Minnesota Duluth
Ty Glover	F	Western Michigan
Dominic James	F	Minnesota Duluth

=== NCAA tournament ===
Tournament MOP
Michael Benning		Denver
All-Tournament Team
Player	Pos	Team
Magnus Chrona	G	Denver
Michael Benning	D	Denver
Carter Savoie	F	Denver
Ryan Barrow	F	Denver

== 2022 NHL entry draft ==
Round	Pick	Player	College	NHL team
1	31	Isaac Howard^{†}	Minnesota Duluth	Tampa Bay Lightning
2	40	Dylan James^{†}	North Dakota	Detroit Red Wings
2	56	Rieger Lorenz^{†}	Denver	Minnesota Wild
3	67	Miko Mitikka^{†}	Denver	Arizona Coyotes
3	82	Adam Ingram^{†}	St. Cloud State	Nashville Predators
3	90	Aidan Thompson^{†}	Denver	Chicago Blackhawks
4	99	Garrett Brown^{†}	Denver	Winnipeg Jets
4	117	Cole Spicer^{†}	North Dakota	Boston Bruins
5	150	Zam Plante^{†}	Minnesota Duluth	Pittsburgh Penguins
5	159	Victor Mancini	Omaha	New York Rangers
6	164	Barrett Hall^{†}	St. Cloud State	Seattle Kraken
6	173	Dominic James	Minnesota Duluth	Chicago Blackhawks
7	209	Abram Wiebe^{†}	North Dakota	Vegas Golden Knights
7	210	Ben Striden^{†}	North Dakota	Nashville Predators
7	221	Jack Devine	Denver	Florida Panthers

† incoming freshman
