= 2021–22 Western Michigan Broncos men's ice hockey season =

NCAA Tournament, Northeast Regional final
- Conference: 3rd NCHC
- Home ice: Lawson Arena

Rankings
- USCHO: #6
- USA Today: #6

Record
- Overall: 26–12–1
- Conference: 14–9–1
- Home: 12–4–0
- Road: 12–6–1
- Neutral: 2–2–0

Coaches and captains
- Head coach: Pat Ferschweiler
- Assistant coaches: J. J. Crew; Will Massey
- Alternate captain(s): Ronnie Attard; Ethen Frank; Josh Passolt; Drew Worrad

The 2021–22 Western Michigan Broncos men's ice hockey season was the 48th season of play for the program and the 9th season in the NCHC conference. They were coached by Pat Ferschweiler, in his first season, and played their home games at Lawson Arena.

== Season ==
Western Michigan commenced the Pat Ferschweiler era in fine form, securing victories in six of its first seven games. The team earned a signature win early on when it defeated top-ranked Michigan after jumping up into the national rankings.The Broncos encountered some difficulties in mid-November but rebounded by securing seven consecutive victories, propelling them into the top-5. WMU recorded more wins in the first half of the season than they had all of the previous year. While this is a bit misleading as the team's schedule was curtailed by the COVID-19 pandemic, the offense was rolling along to the tune of almost four goals a game when they paused for the winter break. The Bronco attack was led by Drew Worrad, Ethen Frank and Ronnie Attard. The trio put the team in a position to win most nights with Brandon Bussi providing capable goaltending when needed.

Expectations were high for the team as it was getting ready for the Great Lakes Invitational. Unfortunately, COVID got in the way once more and forced what was supposed to be the rubber match with Michigan to be cancelled. The team then suffered a bigger blow when team captain Paul Washe left the club, though administrators were tight-lipped about the reasons at the time. Coronavirus put the team on the shelf until the third week of January. When they returned, however, the Broncos didn't appear to have lost any of their fight and put together another impressive stretch with 5 wins in 6 games.

The good times came to an abrupt halt in mid-February when the Broncos went 1–4–1 as they headed down the stretch. The offense dried up for a three-week span and dropped WMU out of contention for the conference regular season title. While they recovered in the final week of the season, albeit against the NCHC's worst team, Western Michigan ended up 3rd in the conference. More importantly, however, because the team had such a high ranking from their success before the losing skid, the Broncos were guaranteed to earn a bid to the NCAA tournament.

=== Postseason ===
The Broncos began their run against Omaha and, once more, their offense carried them to victory. A hat-trick by Luke Grainger was the difference in the first game while Worrad chipped in the final two WMU goals in the rematch. The defense firmed up in the semifinal and enabled the team to down tournament-bound North Dakota 4–2. In Western Michigan's first appearance in the NCHC title game, they met one of the stingiest defenses in Minnesota Duluth. The Broncos were only able to get 19 shots on goal in the contest and none of them could find their way into the cage.

Though the team was disappointed by the result, their championship game appearance earned the Broncos a top-3 national ranking. That gave them one of the #1 seeds and they were sent to Worcester to take on Northeastern. While this was Western Michigan's seventh appearance in the national tournament, the team had still yet to win a single game. Not wanting history to repeat, WMU immediately went on the attack after the puck was dropped and tried to steamroll the Huskies. Northeastern replied in kind and the two teams skated up and down the ice, looking to break through. Western got on the board first, scoring in the later half of the opening period, but stellar goaltending from Devon Levi prevented the Broncos from increasing their advantage. Instead, the team held onto a slim lead for most of the contest while the Huskies attacked relentlessly. Bussi was up to the task, turning aside every Northeastern shot and putting the team in position to win. With just a few minutes remaining in regulation, Northeastern stole the puck at the Broncos' blueline and Aidan McDonough, one of the top goal scorers in the nation, broke towards the WMU net. He slipped around a fallen Jacob Bauer and then shuffled the puck around a sprawled-out Bussi to tie the score. When overtime began, both teams continued their attack and, at about the 90-second mark, Levi made a mistake behind his own net but appeared to make up for the gaffe with a spectacular save. However, upon video review, the puck was confirmed to have completely crossed the line and Luke Grainger became the hero of the Broncos first ever tournament victory.

Their second game of the tournament came against Minnesota and that contest was much different than the first. The Gophers hemmed the Broncos in their own zone for long stretches of the game and didn't allow WMU to get its powerful offense going. Minnesota opened the scoring in the first and seemed comfortable holding the small lead. Attard appeared to tie the score in the middle of the second, however, the goal was waved off due to offsides and left Western's offense stuck in neutral. The Broncos' only penalty of the game almost immediately resulted in a Gopher power play goal and appeared to seal the team's fate. An empty-net goalsent the Broncos home. This was still the furthest the Broncos had ever gotten in the postseason.

=== Rape allegations ===
Just prior to the postseason, Paul Washe was formally charged with sexual assault. Reportedly, the incident occurred at a party on December 5. The unnamed victim, also a WMU student, testified that Washe had led her into a basement and into a secluded corner. Despite repeated attempts to rebuke his advances, she said Washe forced her to her knees and made her perform oral sex. He then pulled her up and raped her. The victim reported the alleged crime three days later and an investigation was launched. By early January, enough evidence had been uncovered to cause the school to suspend Washe, who had previously been investigated for Title IX accusations 4 years earlier.

After news of indictment was made public, Washe was formally dismissed from the team. In May 2022, a judge ruled that there was sufficient evidence to send the case to trial.

== Departures ==
Player	Position	Nationality	Cause
Kale Bennett	Defenseman	United States	Graduation (retired)
Austin Cain	Goaltender	Canada	Graduate transfer to Providence
Rhett Kingston	Forward	Canada	Mid-season transfer to Plattsburgh State
Lukas Samuelsson	Forward	United States	Graduation (retired)
Brett Van Os	Forward	Canada	Graduation (signed with Cincinnati Cyclones)
Paul Washe	Forward	United States	Dismissed from team (criminal allegations)

== Recruiting ==
Player	Position	Nationality	Age	Notes
Xan Gurney	Defenseman	United States	21	Grosse Ile, MI
Max Sasson	Forward	United States	21	Birmingham, MI
Wyatt Schingoethe	Forward	United States	19	Algonquin, IL; selected 195th overall in 2020
Nick Strom	Defenseman	United States	21	Dayton, MN
Dylan Wendt	Forward	Canada	20	Grand Haven, MI

== Roster ==
As of March 22, 2022.

No.	Nat.	Player	Class	Pos	Height	Weight	DoB	Hometown	Previous team	NHL rights
2	(United States)	Jacob Bauer	Sophomore	D	6' 3" (1.91 m)	202 lb (92 kg)	2002-02-25	Milford, Michigan	Lincoln Stars (USHL)	—
3	(United States)	Michael Joyaux	Senior	D	5' 10" (1.78 m)	181 lb (82 kg)	1997-02-13	Bloomingdale, Illinois	Youngstown Phantoms (USHL)	—
4	(United States)	Xan Gurney	Freshman	D	6' 3" (1.91 m)	200 lb (91 kg)	2000-05-28	Grosse Ile, Michigan	Green Bay Gamblers (USHL)	—
6	(United States)	Scooter Brickey	Junior	D	6' 3" (1.91 m)	207 lb (94 kg)	1999-05-27	Burtchville, Michigan	Des Moines Buccaneers (USHL)	—
7	(United States)	Ronnie Attard (A)	Junior	D	6' 4" (1.93 m)	210 lb (95 kg)	1999-03-20	White Lake, Michigan	Tri-City Storm (USHL)	PHI, 72nd overall 2019
8	(Canada)	Matteo Pecchia	Sophomore	F	5' 11" (1.8 m)	192 lb (87 kg)	2000-06-05	Nobleton, Ontario	Mississauga Chargers (OJHL)	—
9	(Canada)	Luke Grainger	Sophomore	F	5' 10" (1.78 m)	180 lb (82 kg)	1999-09-03	Montreal, Quebec	Hawkesbury Hawks (CCHL)	—
10	(United States)	Chad Hillebrand	Sophomore	F	6' 4" (1.93 m)	200 lb (91 kg)	1999-01-22	Park Ridge, Illinois	Green Bay Gamblers (USHL)	—
12	(United States)	Cole Gallant	Senior	F	5' 10" (1.78 m)	190 lb (86 kg)	1998-03-14	Dover, Florida	Omaha Lancers (USHL)	—
13	(Canada)	Drew Worrad (A)	Senior	F	6' 2" (1.88 m)	186 lb (84 kg)	1997-06-30	Birr, Ontario	Steinbach Pistons (MJHL)	—
14	(United States)	Jason Polin	Junior	F	6' 0" (1.83 m)	198 lb (90 kg)	1999-06-17	Holt, Michigan	Cedar Rapids RoughRiders (USHL)	—
15	(Canada)	Daniel Hilsendager	Sophomore	D	6' 1" (1.85 m)	202 lb (92 kg)	2000-03-30	Lloydminster, Saskatchewan	Omaha Lancers (USHL)	—
16	(United States)	Tim Washe	Sophomore	F	6' 3" (1.91 m)	210 lb (95 kg)	2001-08-25	Clarkston, Michigan	Nanaimo Clippers (BCHL)	—
17	(Switzerland)	Cédric Fiedler	Sophomore	D	6' 3" (1.91 m)	204 lb (93 kg)	2001-04-20	Zug, Switzerland	Fargo Force (USHL)	—
18	(United States)	Wyatt Schingoethe	Freshman	F	5' 11" (1.8 m)	180 lb (82 kg)	2002-08-03	Algonquin, Illinois	Waterloo Black Hawks (USHL)	TOR, 195th overall 2020
19	(United States)	Cam Knuble	Sophomore	F	6' 0" (1.83 m)	200 lb (91 kg)	2000-07-23	Grand Rapids, Michigan	Muskegon Lumberjacks (USHL)	—
20	(Canada)	Jamie Rome	Senior	F	6' 2" (1.88 m)	211 lb (96 kg)	1998-10-03	Cochrane, Alberta	Victoria Grizzlies (BCHL)	—
21	(United States)	Josh Passolt (A)	Graduate	F	6' 0" (1.83 m)	180 lb (82 kg)	1996-09-13	Hayward, Wisconsin	Sioux Falls Stampede (USHL)	—
22	(United States)	Trevor Bishop	Sophomore	F	6' 0" (1.83 m)	185 lb (84 kg)	1999-01-23	Rochester Hills, Michigan	Victoria Grizzlies (BCHL)	—
24	(United States)	Aidan Fulp	Sophomore	D	6' 3" (1.91 m)	210 lb (95 kg)	2000-02-29	Indianapolis, Indiana	Dubuque Fighting Saints (USHL)	—
25	(United States)	Jared Kucharek	Senior	D	6' 4" (1.93 m)	203 lb (92 kg)	1998-05-23	Royal Oak, Michigan	Madison Capitols (USHL)	—
26	(United States)	Ethen Frank (A)	Graduate	F	5' 10" (1.78 m)	175 lb (79 kg)	1998-02-05	Papillion, Nebraska	Lincoln Stars (USHL)	—
27	(Canada)	Ty Glover	Sophomore	F	6' 3" (1.91 m)	200 lb (91 kg)	2000-10-01	London, Ontario	Lincoln Stars (USHL)	—
28	(United States)	Hugh Larkin	Sophomore	F	6' 2" (1.88 m)	205 lb (93 kg)	1999-03-27	Livonia, Michigan	Austin Bruins (NAHL)	—
29	(Canada)	Jarred White	Sophomore	F	5' 10" (1.78 m)	200 lb (91 kg)	1999-05-21	Edmonton, Alberta	Sherwood Park Crusaders (AJHL)	—
30	(United States)	Brandon Bussi	Junior	G	6' 5" (1.96 m)	210 lb (95 kg)	1998-06-25	Sound Beach, New York	Muskegon Lumberjacks (USHL)	—
31	(Canada)	Ross Hawryluk	Sophomore	G	6' 4" (1.93 m)	208 lb (94 kg)	2001-03-19	Lloydminster, Alberta	Nipawin Hawks (SJHL)	—
34	(United States)	Max Sasson	Freshman	F	6' 1" (1.85 m)	185 lb (84 kg)	2000-09-05	Birmingham, Michigan	Waterloo Black Hawks (USHL)	—
35	(United States)	Alex Aslanidis	Sophomore	G	6' 5" (1.96 m)	205 lb (93 kg)	2001-01-20	Morristown, New Jersey	Navan Grads (CCHL)	—
37	(United States)	Dylan Wendt	Freshman	F	6' 1" (1.85 m)	185 lb (84 kg)	2001-01-09	Grand Haven, Michigan	Muskegon Lumberjacks (USHL)	—
55	(United States)	Nick Strom	Freshman	D	6' 0" (1.83 m)	185 lb (84 kg)	2000-03-21	Dayton, Minnesota	Fargo Force (USHL)	—

== Standings ==
2021–22 National Collegiate Hockey Conference Standings
	Conference record										Overall record					
	GP	W	L	T	OTW	OTL	3/SW	PTS	GF	GA	GP	W	L	T	GF	GA
#1 Denver †	24	18	6	0	1	0	0	53	98	55	41	31	9	1	175	93
#9 North Dakota †	24	17	6	1	1	1	1	53	78	58	39	24	14	1	119	99
#6 Western Michigan	24	14	9	1	1	0	1	43	84	68	39	26	12	1	138	101
#11 St. Cloud State	24	10	10	4	1	2	1	36	84	69	37	18	15	4	133	97
#5 Minnesota Duluth *	24	10	10	4	1	1	2	36	61	56	42	22	16	4	109	93
Omaha	24	11	13	0	2	1	0	32	65	74	38	21	17	0	123	102
Colorado College	24	6	17	1	2	1	0	18	48	87	36	9	24	3	79	116
Miami	24	4	19	1	0	3	1	17	54	105	36	7	27	2	94	153
Championship: March 19, 2022 † indicates conference regular season champion (Penrose Cup) * indicates conference tournament champion (Frozen Faceoff Championship Trophy); Rankings: USCHO.com Top 20 Poll

== Schedule and results ==
Date	Time	Opponent^{#}	Rank^{#}	Site	TV	Decision	Result	Attendance	Record
Exhibition
October 2	4:00 PM	at Ohio State*		Value City Arena • Columbus, OH			W 3–1		
Regular season
October 8	7:05 PM	Ferris State*		Lawson Arena • Kalamazoo, MI		Bussi	W 4–0	3,669	1–0–0
October 9	7:07 PM	at Ferris State*		Ewigleben Arena • Big Rapids, MI		Bussi	W 4–3	1,827	2–0–0
October 22	7:30 PM	at #1 Michigan*	#17	Yost Ice Arena • Ann Arbor, MI	BTN+	Bussi	W 5–2	5,800	3–0–0
October 23	7:05 PM	#1 Michigan*	#17	Lawson Arena • Kalamazoo, MI		Bussi	L 2–3 ^{OT}	3,369	3–1–0
October 29	7:00 PM	at Colgate*	#13	Class of 1965 Arena • Hamilton, NY	ESPN+	Bussi	W 6–5	1,022	4–1–0
October 30	5:00 PM	at Colgate*	#13	Class of 1965 Arena • Hamilton, NY	ESPN+	Bussi	W 2–1 ^{OT}	844	5–1–0
November 5	7:05 PM	#4 Minnesota Duluth	#10	Lawson Arena • Kalamazoo, MI		Bussi	W 4–3	3,569	6–1–0 (1–0–0)
November 6	7:05 PM	#4 Minnesota Duluth	#10	Lawson Arena • Kalamazoo, MI		Bussi	L 0–3	3,781	6–2–0 (1–1–0)
November 12	9:07 PM	at #14 Denver	#9	Magness Arena • Denver, CO		Bussi	L 3–5	4,540	6–3–0 (1–2–0)
November 13	9:07 PM	at #14 Denver	#9	Magness Arena • Denver, CO		Bussi	L 2–5	4,981	6–4–0 (1–3–0)
November 19	7:05 PM	#2 St. Cloud State	#13	Lawson Arena • Kalamazoo, MI		Bussi	W 6–2	3,369	7–4–0 (2–3–0)
November 20	7:05 PM	#2 St. Cloud State	#13	Lawson Arena • Kalamazoo, MI		Bussi	W 4–0	3,669	8–4–0 (3–3–0)
November 26	7:00 PM	at St. Lawrence*	#7	Appleton Arena • Canton, NY		Bussi	W 8–2	671	9–4–0
November 27	7:00 PM	at St. Lawrence*	#7	Appleton Arena • Canton, NY		Bussi	W 5–1	652	10–4–0
December 3	7:05 PM	at Miami	#6	Steve Cady Arena • Oxford, OH		Bussi	W 6–3	2,116	11–4–0 (4–3–0)
December 4	5:05 PM	at Miami	#6	Steve Cady Arena • Oxford, OH		Bussi	W 5–3	1,881	12–4–0 (5–3–0)
December 10	7:05 PM	#14 Omaha	#4	Lawson Arena • Kalamazoo, MI		Bussi	W 4–2	3,275	13–4–0 (6–3–0)
December 11	7:05 PM	#14 Omaha	#4	Lawson Arena • Kalamazoo, MI		Bussi	L 0–1	3,673	13–5–0 (6–4–0)
Great Lakes Invitational
December 29	7:00 PM	at Michigan State*	#4	Munn Ice Arena • East Lansing, MI (Great Lakes Invitational)		Bussi	W 3–1	5,538	14–5–0
December 30	7:00 PM	#3 Michigan*	#4	Yost Ice Arena • Ann Arbor, MI (Great Lakes Invitational)	Cancelled due to the COVID-19 pandemic				
Regular season
January 21	7:05 PM	#9 North Dakota	#4	Lawson Arena • Kalamazoo, MI		Bussi	W 4–1	3,769	15–5–0 (7–4–0)
January 22	7:05 PM	#9 North Dakota	#4	Lawson Arena • Kalamazoo, MI		Bussi	W 2–0	3,567	16–5–0 (8–4–0)
January 28	7:07 PM	at #7 Minnesota Duluth	#3	AMSOIL Arena • Duluth, MN		Bussi	L 4–5	5,479	16–6–0 (8–5–0)
January 29	7:07 PM	at #7 Minnesota Duluth	#3	AMSOIL Arena • Duluth, MN		Bussi	W 3–2 ^{OT}	6,296	17–6–0 (9–5–0)
February 4	9:30 PM	at Colorado College	#5	Ed Robson Arena • Colorado Springs, CO	ATTRM	Bussi	W 8–2	3,441	18–6–0 (10–5–0)
February 5	8:00 PM	at Colorado College	#5	Ed Robson Arena • Colorado Springs, CO		Bussi	W 5–4	3,512	19–6–0 (11–5–0)
February 11	7:30 PM	at #10 St. Cloud State	#5	Herb Brooks National Hockey Center • St. Cloud, MN		Bussi	T 5–5 ^{SOW}	3,627	19–6–1 (11–5–1)
February 12	6:00 PM	at #10 St. Cloud State	#5	Herb Brooks National Hockey Center • St. Cloud, MN		Bussi	L 1–4	4,567	19–7–1 (11–6–1)
February 18	7:05 PM	#3 Denver	#6	Lawson Arena • Kalamazoo, MI		Bussi	L 1–4	3,593	19–8–1 (11–7–1)
February 19	7:05 PM	#3 Denver	#6	Lawson Arena • Kalamazoo, MI		Bussi	W 6–4	3,606	20–8–1 (12–7–1)
February 25	8:07 PM	at #7 North Dakota	#6	Ralph Engelstad Arena • Grand Forks, ND	CBSSN	Bussi	L 1–2	11,510	20–9–1 (12–8–1)
February 26	7:07 PM	at #7 North Dakota	#6	Ralph Engelstad Arena • Grand Forks, ND		Bussi	L 2–5	12,088	20–10–1 (12–9–1)
March 4	7:05 PM	Miami	#8	Lawson Arena • Kalamazoo, MI		Bussi	W 5–3	3,053	21–10–1 (13–9–1)
March 5	7:05 PM	Miami	#8	Lawson Arena • Kalamazoo, MI		Bussi	W 3–0	3,303	22–10–1 (14–9–1)
NCHC Tournament
March 11	7:05 PM	#19 Omaha*	#7	Lawson Arena • Kalamazoo, MI (Quarterfinal Game 1)		Bussi	W 4–2	3,107	23–10–1
March 12	7:05 PM	#19 Omaha*	#7	Lawson Arena • Kalamazoo, MI (Quarterfinal Game 2)		Bussi	W 5–4 ^{OT}	3,669	24–10–1
Western Michigan Won Series 2–0
March 18	8:37 PM	vs. #5 North Dakota*	#7	Xcel Energy Center • Saint Paul, Minnesota (Semifinal)	CBSSN	Bussi	W 4–2	10,253	25–10–1
March 19	8:37 PM	vs. #8 Minnesota Duluth*	#7	Xcel Energy Center • Saint Paul, Minnesota (Championship)	CBSSN	Bussi	L 0–3	7,814	25–11–1
NCAA Tournament
March 25	12:00 PM	vs. #12 Northeastern*	#4	DCU Center • Worcester, Massachusetts (Worcester Regional semifinal)	ESPNU	Bussi	W 2–1 ^{OT}	6,002	26–11–1
March 27	4:00 PM	vs. #5 Minnesota*	#4	DCU Center • Worcester, Massachusetts (Worcester Regional final)	ESPN2	Bussi	L 0–3	2,848	26–12–1
*Non-conference game. ^{#}Rankings from USCHO.com Poll. All times are in Eastern Time. Source:

== Scoring statistics ==
Name	Position	Games	Goals	Assists	Points	PIM
Drew Worrad	C	39	9	36	45	20
Ethen Frank	C	38	26	13	39	34
Ronnie Attard	D	39	13	23	36	24
Michael Joyaux	D	39	7	25	32	25
Josh Passolt	LW	38	8	20	28	20
Jason Polin	F	39	16	10	26	4
Cole Gallant	RW	39	9	16	25	2
Max Sasson	F	37	9	13	22	18
Ty Glover	C	39	8	13	21	48
Luke Grainger	F	39	8	7	15	12
Paul Washe	C	19	8	5	13	12
Aidan Fulp	D	34	2	11	13	38
Chad Hillebrand	F	27	2	6	8	10
Cédric Fiedler	D	39	0	8	8	26
Daniel Hilsendager	D	37	1	5	6	10
Jamie Rome	F	22	1	5	6	8
Tim Washe	C	39	2	3	5	16
Jacob Bauer	D	34	1	4	5	10
Hugh Larkin	RW	19	3	1	4	6
Brandon Bussi	G	39	0	4	4	2
Dylan Wendt	F	34	1	2	3	4
Scooter Brickey	D	10	1	0	1	0
Rhett Kingston	LW	10	1	0	1	6
Cam Knuble	F	6	1	0	1	0
Wyatt Schingoethe	C	21	0	0	0	12
Ross Hawryluk	G	1	0	0	0	0
Jared Kucharek	D	1	0	0	0	0
Bench	-	-	-	-	-	16
Total			138	229	367	383

== Goaltending statistics ==
Name	Games	Minutes	Wins	Losses	Ties	Goals against	Saves	Shut outs	SV %	GAA
Ross Hawryluk	1	8	0	0	0	0	0	0	.000	0.00
Brandon Bussi	39	2334	26	12	1	99	1022	4	.912	2.55
Empty Net	-	14	-	-	-	2	-	-	-	-
Total	37	2256	26	12	1	101	1022	4	.912	2.54

== Rankings ==
Poll	Week																									
Poll	Pre	1	2	3	4	5	6	7	8	9	10	11	12	13	14	15	16	17	18	19	20	21	22	23	24	25 (Final)
USCHO.com	NR	NR	19	17	13	10	9	13	7	6	4 (1)	4	3	3	4	3 (8)	5	5	6	6	8	7	7	4	-	6
USA Today	NR	NR	NR	NR	11	11	10	13	7	5	4 (1)	4 (1)	3	3	3	3 (3)	5	5	5	6	8	7	7	5	5	6

Note: USCHO did not release a poll in week 24.

== Awards and honors ==
Player	Award	Ref
Ronnie Attard	AHCA West First Team All-American	
Ethen Frank	AHCA West Second Team All-American	
Ronnie Attard	NCHC Offensive Defenseman of the Year	
Drew Worrad	NCHC Scholar-Athlete of the Year	
Ronnie Attard	NCHC First Team	
Ethen Frank	NCHC First Team	
Drew Worrad	NCHC Second Team	
Ty Glover	Frozen Faceoff All-Tournament Team	
Ronnie Attard	Frozen Faceoff All-Tournament Team	
