= 2021–22 NCAA Division I men's ice hockey season =

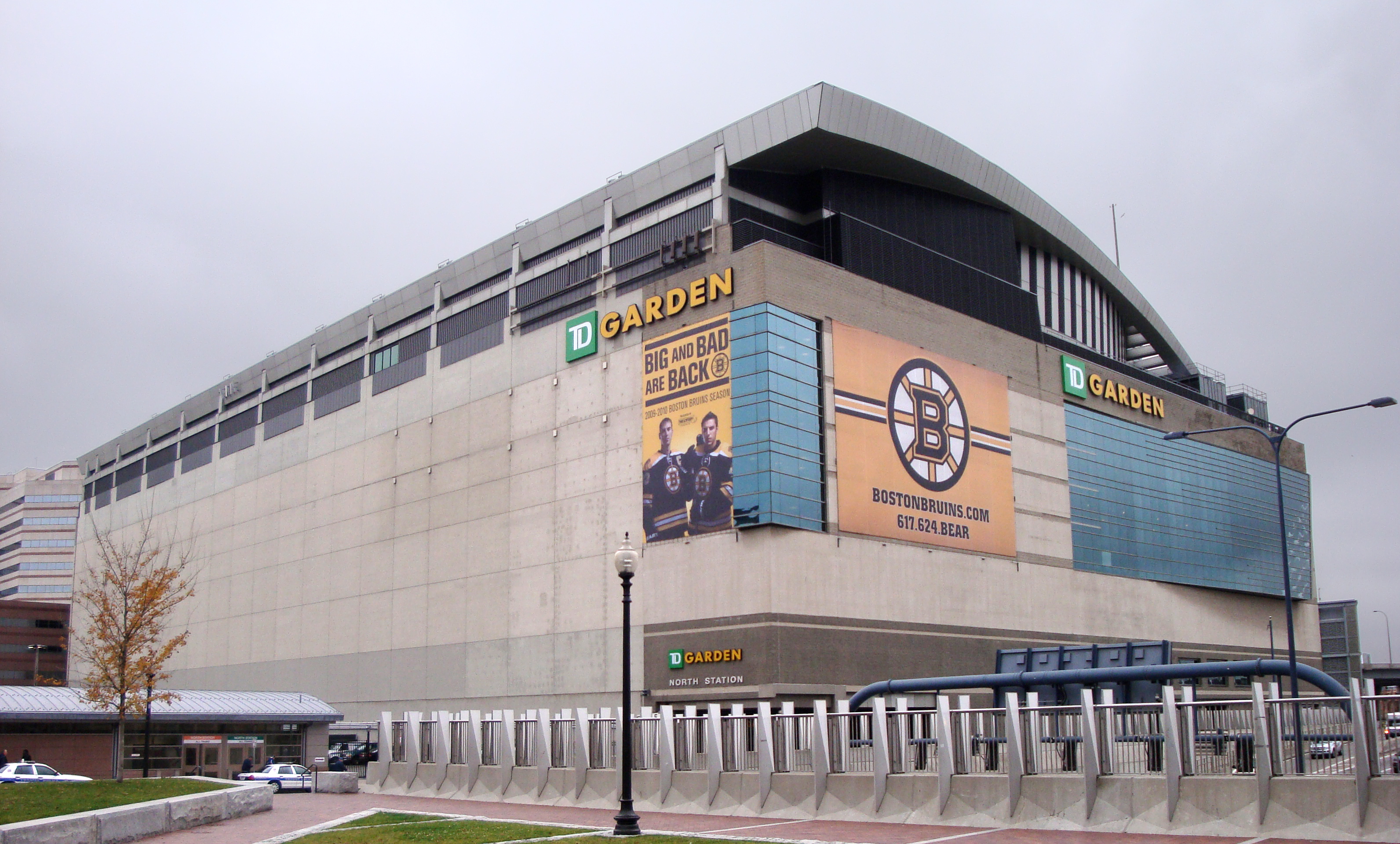
- TD Garden in Boston, Massachusetts hosted the 2022 Frozen Four
- Duration: October 2, 2021– April 9, 2022
- NCAA tournament: 2022
- National championship: TD Garden; Boston, Massachusetts
- NCAA champion: Denver
- Hobey Baker Award: Dryden McKay (Minnesota State)

The 2021–22 NCAA Division I men's ice hockey season began on October 2, 2021, and concluded with the NCAA championship on April 9, 2022. This was the 74th season in which an NCAA ice hockey championship was held, and was US college hockey's 128th year overall.

== Conference realignment and program suspensions ==
Seven schools that had been members of the men's WCHA made a joint decision to leave and reestablish the CCHA, whose original version had last played in the 2012–13 season. They were joined by St. Thomas, who were raising their athletic programs from Division III. Of the remaining three WCHA men's teams, Alaska would continue as an independent program, Alaska Anchorage would suspend operations until fundraising efforts could determine the future of the team and Alabama–Huntsville would suspend operations until they could secure placement within a conference.

On May 26, Robert Morris University announced the termination of both their men's and women's ice hockey teams. The news came as a shock to most, both within and outside the program, and immediately led to fundraising efforts to secure the return of both teams. Despite collecting more than $1 million in donations in under 3 months, the university declared in early August that the team would not be able to participate in the 2021–22 season and would look to return in 2022–23. RMU would announce on December 17, 2021, that both men's and women's teams would resume play in 2023–24.

On August 31, Alaska Anchorage announced that the $3 million fundraising goal had been reached and the team would return for the 2022–23 season.

=== Membership changes ===
School	Former Conference	New Conference
Alabama–Huntsville Chargers	WCHA	Suspended Program
Alaska Nanooks	WCHA	Independent
Alaska–Anchorage Seawolves	WCHA	Suspended Program
Bemidji State Beavers	WCHA	CCHA
Bowling Green Falcons	WCHA	CCHA
Ferris State Bulldogs	WCHA	CCHA
Lake Superior State Lakers	WCHA	CCHA
Michigan Tech Huskies	WCHA	CCHA
Minnesota State Mavericks	WCHA	CCHA
Northern Michigan Wildcats	WCHA	CCHA
Robert Morris Colonials	Atlantic Hockey	Suspended Program
St. Thomas Tommies	MIAC (DIII)	CCHA

== Regular season ==
=== Season tournaments ===
Tournament	Dates	Teams	Champion
Ice Breaker Tournament	October 8–9	4	Boston College
Ice Breaker Tournament	October 15–16	4	Michigan
Holiday Face–Off	December 28–29	4	Wisconsin
Great Lakes Invitational	December 29–30	4	not awarded
Ledyard Bank Classic	December 30–31	4	Boston College
Connecticut Ice	January 29–30	4	Quinnipiac
Beanpot	February 7, 14	4	Boston University

=== Standings ===
2021–22 Atlantic Hockey Standings
	Conference record										Overall record					
	GP	W	L	T	OW	OL	SW	PTS	GF	GA	GP	W	L	T	GF	GA
#18 American International †*	26	17	7	2	1	2	0	54	97	61	38	22	13	3	134	95
Canisius	26	13	11	2	2	1	1	43	76	67	35	16	16	3	99	97
Army	26	12	11	3	0	1	2	42	75	68	35	14	17	4	98	100
RIT	26	12	10	4	1	3	3	41	69	82	38	18	16	4	92	115
Sacred Heart	26	11	12	3	0	1	3	40	72	70	37	15	18	4	95	100
Air Force	26	11	12	3	3	2	2	37	76	80	36	16	17	3	99	127
Mercyhurst	26	10	12	4	0	1	1	36	75	79	39	16	19	4	114	129
Niagara	26	10	13	3	2	2	1	34	70	79	36	11	22	3	82	122
Bentley	26	10	14	2	1	2	1	34	70	78	36	14	20	2	94	117
Holy Cross	26	10	14	2	3	0	0	29	56	72	37	12	23	2	77	108
Championship: March 19, 2022 † indicates conference regular season champion * indicates conference tournament champion (Riley Trophy); Rankings: USCHO.com Top 20 Poll

2021–22 Big Ten ice hockey Standings
	Conference record										Overall record					
	GP	W	L	T	OTW	OTL	3/SW	PTS	GF	GA	GP	W	L	T	GF	GA
#5 Minnesota †	24	18	6	0	1	2	0	55	90	50	39	26	13	0	138	91
#2 Michigan *	24	16	8	0	0	3	0	51	91	59	42	31	10	1	167	94
#9 Notre Dame	24	17	7	0	5	1	0	47	74	55	40	28	12	0	122	75
#16 Ohio State	24	13	9	2	1	1	1	42	76	59	37	22	13	2	125	87
Penn State	24	6	17	1	1	1	1	20	63	92	38	17	20	1	117	122
Wisconsin	24	6	17	1	1	2	0	20	53	96	37	10	24	3	76	132
Michigan State	24	6	18	0	1	0	0	17	51	87	36	12	23	1	76	119
Championship: March 19, 2022 † indicates conference regular season champion * indicates conference tournament champion Rankings: USCHO.com Top 20 Poll; updated April 7, 2022

2021–22 Central Collegiate Hockey Association Standings
	Conference record										Overall record					
	GP	W	L	T	OTW	OTL	3/SW	PTS	GF	GA	GP	W	L	T	GF	GA
#2 Minnesota State †*	26	23	3	0	2	0	0	67	115	28	44	38	6	0	178	60
#14 Michigan Tech	26	16	8	2	2	4	0	54	93	53	37	21	13	3	118	75
Bemidji State	26	14	12	0	1	1	0	42	83	81	39	19	20	0	118	121
Lake Superior State	26	13	13	0	1	1	0	39	69	64	37	18	18	1	107	104
Northern Michigan	26	12	13	1	3	0	1	35	86	99	37	20	16	1	132	136
Bowling Green	26	11	14	1	2	1	0	33	67	87	37	15	19	3	94	119
Ferris State	26	9	16	1	2	2	0	28	66	99	36	11	24	1	90	135
St. Thomas	26	3	22	1	0	4	0	14	45	112	36	3	32	1	61	168
Championship: March 19, 2022 † indicates conference regular season champion (MacNaughton Cup) * indicates conference tournament champion (Mason Cup); Rankings: USCHO.com Top 20 Poll

2021–22 NCAA Division I Independent ice hockey standings
	Overall record					
	GP	W	L	T	GF	GA
Alaska	34	14	18	2	87	95
Arizona State	35	17	17	1	116	121
Long Island	34	10	21	3	87	120
Rankings: USCHO.com Top 20 Poll

2021–22 ECAC Hockey Standings
	Conference record										Overall record					
	GP	W	L	T	OTW	OTL	3/SW	PTS	GF	GA	GP	W	L	T	GF	GA
#8 Quinnipiac †	22	17	4	1	0	1	1	54	71	14	42	32	7	3	139	53
#17 Clarkson	22	14	4	4	0	2	3	51	86	47	37	21	10	6	123	85
#15 Harvard *	22	14	6	2	0	0	2	46	69	46	35	21	11	3	116	82
Cornell	22	12	6	4	2	1	0	39	73	47	32	18	10	4	100	72
Colgate	22	9	9	4	1	0	3	33	55	57	40	18	18	4	111	112
Rensselaer	22	10	12	0	0	0	0	30	58	63	44	18	23	3	114	119
Union	22	9	11	2	3	1	0	27	52	66	37	14	19	4	89	110
St. Lawrence	22	7	10	5	2	0	2	26	44	60	37	11	19	7	72	110
Brown	22	6	12	4	0	1	2	25	36	61	31	7	20	4	50	100
Princeton	22	7	14	1	0	1	0	23	54	89	31	8	21	2	70	122
Yale	22	7	14	1	3	1	1	21	38	60	30	8	21	1	55	90
Dartmouth	22	5	15	2	0	3	1	21	45	71	32	7	22	3	69	110
Championship: March 19, 2022 † indicates conference regular season champion (Cleary Cup) * indicates conference tournament champion (Whitelaw Cup); Rankings: USCHO.com Top 20 Poll

2021–22 Hockey East Standings
	Conference record										Overall record					
	GP	W	L	T	OTW	OTL	SOW	PTS	GF	GA	GP	W	L	T	GF	GA
#12 Northeastern †	24	15	8	1	1	1	1	47	68	46	39	25	13	1	99	68
#10 Massachusetts *	24	14	8	2	2	3	1	46	77	54	37	22	13	2	117	88
#13 Massachusetts Lowell	24	15	8	1	1	0	1	46	62	48	35	21	11	3	102	74
#19 Connecticut	24	14	10	0	2	1	0	41	73	61	36	20	16	0	109	89
Boston University	24	13	8	3	3	2	0	41	69	58	35	19	13	3	107	89
Merrimack	24	13	11	0	1	3	0	41	70	70	35	19	15	1	109	99
#20 Providence	24	12	11	1	1	1	1	38	61	52	38	22	14	2	118	82
Boston College	24	9	12	3	0	1	1	32	67	77	38	15	18	5	114	123
New Hampshire	24	8	15	1	2	2	0	25	47	71	34	14	19	1	76	95
Vermont	24	6	16	2	3	1	2	20	41	72	35	8	25	2	59	101
Maine	24	5	17	2	2	3	1	19	54	80	33	7	22	4	74	111
Championship: March 19, 2022 † indicates regular season champion * indicates conference tournament champion (Lamoriello Trophy); Rankings: USCHO.com Top 20 Poll

2021–22 National Collegiate Hockey Conference Standings
	Conference record										Overall record					
	GP	W	L	T	OTW	OTL	3/SW	PTS	GF	GA	GP	W	L	T	GF	GA
#1 Denver †	24	18	6	0	1	0	0	53	98	55	41	31	9	1	175	93
#9 North Dakota †	24	17	6	1	1	1	1	53	78	58	39	24	14	1	119	99
#6 Western Michigan	24	14	9	1	1	0	1	43	84	68	39	26	12	1	138	101
#11 St. Cloud State	24	10	10	4	1	2	1	36	84	69	37	18	15	4	133	97
#5 Minnesota Duluth *	24	10	10	4	1	1	2	36	61	56	42	22	16	4	109	93
Omaha	24	11	13	0	2	1	0	32	65	74	38	21	17	0	123	102
Colorado College	24	6	17	1	2	1	0	18	48	87	36	9	24	3	79	116
Miami	24	4	19	1	0	3	1	17	54	105	36	7	27	2	94	153
Championship: March 19, 2022 † indicates conference regular season champion (Penrose Cup) * indicates conference tournament champion (Frozen Faceoff Championship Trophy); Rankings: USCHO.com Top 20 Poll

== PairWise Rankings ==
The PairWise Rankings (PWR) are a statistical tool designed to approximate the process by which the NCAA selection committee decides which teams get at-large bids to the 16-team NCAA tournament. Although the NCAA selection committee does not use the PWR as presented by USCHO, the PWR has been accurate in predicting which teams will make the tournament field.

For Division I men, all teams are included in comparisons starting in the 2013–14 season (formerly, only teams with a Ratings Percentage Index of .500 or above, or teams under consideration, were included). The PWR method compares each team with every other such team, with the winner of each “comparison” earning one PWR point. After all comparisons are made, the points are totaled up and rankings listed accordingly.

With 59 Division I men's teams, the greatest number of PWR points any team could earn is 58, winning the comparison with every other team. Meanwhile, a team that lost all of its comparisons would have no PWR points.

Teams are then ranked by PWR point total, with ties broken by the teams’ RPI ratings, which starting in 2013-14 is weighted for home and road games and includes a quality wins bonus (QWB) for beating teams in the top 20 of the RPI (it also is weighted for home and road).

When it comes to comparing teams, the PWR uses three criteria which are combined to make a comparison: RPI, record against common opponents and head-to-head competition. Starting in 2013–14, the comparison of record against teams under consideration was dropped because all teams are now under comparison.

NCAA Division I Men's Hockey Final PairWise Rankings
Rank	Team	PWR	RPI	Conference
1	Michigan	57	.6087	Big Ten
1	Minnesota State	57	.6080*	CCHA
3	Western Michigan	55	.5789	NCHC
4	Denver	54	.5846	NCHC
4	Minnesota Duluth	54	.5690	NCHC
6	Minnesota	53	.5773	Big Ten
7	North Dakota	52	.5720	NCHC
8	Quinnipiac	51	.5648*	ECAC Hockey
8	Notre Dame	51	.5607	Big Ten
10	St. Cloud State	49	.5602	NCHC
11	Massachusetts	48	.5584	Hockey East
12	Michigan Tech	47	.5482	CCHA
13	Massachusetts Lowell	46	.5433	Hockey East
14	Northeastern	45	.5431	Hockey East
15	Ohio State	44	.5391	Big Ten
16	Clarkson	42	.5341	ECAC Hockey
17	Boston University	41	.5333	Hockey East
17	Harvard	41	.5326	ECAC Hockey
17	Providence	41	.5309	Hockey East
20	American International	38	.5294	Atlantic Hockey
20	Connecticut	38	.5294	Hockey East
22	Merrimack	37	.5270	Hockey East
23	Omaha	36	.5250	NCHC
23	Cornell	36	.5140	ECAC Hockey
25	Penn State	34	.5095	Big Ten
25	Northern Michigan	34	.5061	CCHA
27	Arizona State	31	.5061	Independent
27	Boston College	31	.5044	Hockey East
29	Bemidji State	30	.5020	CCHA
29	Alaska	30	.5008	Independent
31	Colgate	28	.4924	ECAC Hockey
32	Lake Superior State	27	.4914	CCHA
33	New Hampshire	26	.4845	Hockey East
34	Bowling Green	24	.4818	CCHA
35	Sacred Heart	23	.4831	Atlantic Hockey
35	Michigan State	23	.4808	Big Ten
37	Wisconsin	22	.4803	Big Ten
38	RIT	21	.4753	Atlantic Hockey
39	Mercyhurst	20	.4778	Atlantic Hockey
39	Canisius	20	.4723	Atlantic Hockey
41	Rensselaer	18	.4703	ECAC Hockey
42	Army	17	.4669	Atlantic Hockey
43	Air Force	15	.4638	Atlantic Hockey
43	Bentley	15	.4618	Atlantic Hockey
45	Colorado College	14	.4638	NCHC
46	Miami	13	.4616	NCHC
46	Union	13	.4572	ECAC Hockey
48	St. Lawrence	11	.4514	ECAC Hockey
49	Ferris State	10	.4498	CCHA
50	Niagara	9	.4494	Atlantic Hockey
51	Maine	7	.4435	Hockey East
51	Holy Cross	7	.4398	Atlantic Hockey
53	Long Island	6	.4363	Independent
54	Dartmouth	5	.4362	ECAC Hockey
55	Vermont	4	.4356	Hockey East
56	Princeton	3	.4350	ECAC Hockey
57	Brown	2	.4322	ECAC Hockey
58	Yale	1	.4279	ECAC Hockey
59	St. Thomas	0	.4132	CCHA
*A team's RPI has been adjusted to remove negative effect from defeating a weak opponent Note: A team's record is based only on games against other Division I hockey schools which are eligible for the NCAA tournament

== Player stats ==
=== Scoring leaders ===
Player	Class	Team	GP	G	A	Pts	PIM
Bobby Brink	Junior	Denver	41	14	43	57	44
Nathan Smith	Junior	Minnesota State	38	19	31	50	43
Bobby Trivigno	Senior	Massachusetts	37	20	29	49	28
Julian Napravnik	Senior	Minnesota State	38	18	31	49	10
Owen Sillinger	Senior	Bemidji State	39	17	30	47	41
Carter Savoie	Sophomore	Denver	39	23	22	45	37
Cole Guttman	Senior	Denver	41	19	26	45	26
Drew Worrad	Senior	Western Michigan	39	9	36	45	20
Brian Halonen	Senior	Michigan Tech	37	21	23	44	49
Louis Boudon	Junior	Lake Superior State	36	15	29	44	31
Hank Crone	Senior	Northern Michigan	32	13	31	44	22

=== Leading goaltenders ===
The following goaltenders lead the NCAA in goals against average, minimum 1/3 of team's minutes played.
GP = Games played; Min = Minutes played; W = Wins; L = Losses; T = Ties; GA = Goals against; SO = Shutouts; SV% = Save percentage; GAA = Goals against average

Player	Class	Team	GP	Min	W	L	T	GA	SO	SV%	GAA
Yaniv Perets	Freshman	Quinnipiac	31	1,841:43	22	5	2	36	11	.939	1.17
Dryden McKay	Senior	Minnesota State	43	2,559:38	38	5	0	56	10	.931	1.31
Devon Levi	Sophomore	Northeastern	32	1,875:30	21	10	1	48	10	.952	1.54
Ian Shane	Freshman	Cornell	17	979:27	7	6	3	28	3	.933	1.72
Justen Close	Junior	Minnesota	20	1,114:24	14	4	0	34	3	.929	1.83
Ryan Fanti	Junior	Minnesota Duluth	37	2,201:23	20	12	4	67	7	.929	1.83
Matthew Galajda	Graduate	Notre Dame	26	1,481:29	18	8	0	47	2	.933	1.90
Blake Pietila	Junior	Michigan Tech	37	2,194:53	21	13	2	70	7	.918	1.91
Owen Savory	Senior	Massachusetts Lowell	29	1,738:34	20	7	2	56	5	.926	1.93
Ryan Bischel	Junior	Notre Dame	16	921:52	10	4	0	32	2	.924	2.08

== Tournament bracket ==
Regional semifinals March 24–25
1	Michigan (1)	5
4	American International	3
Midwest – Allentown – Fri/Sun
2	Quinnipiac	5
3	St. Cloud State	4
1	Denver (4)	3
4	Massachusetts Lowell	2
West – Loveland – Thu/Sat
2	Minnesota Duluth	3
3	Michigan Tech	0
1	Western Michigan (3)	2*
4	Northeastern	1
Northeast – Worcester – Fri/Sun
2	Minnesota	4*
3	Massachusetts	3
1	Minnesota State (2)	4
4	Harvard	3
East – Albany – Thu/Sat
2	North Dakota	1
3	Notre Dame	2*

Regional Finals; March 26–27
1	Michigan (1)	7
2	Quinnipiac	4
1	Denver (4)	2
2	Minnesota Duluth	1
1	Western Michigan (3)	0
2	Minnesota	3
1	Minnesota State (2)	1
3	Notre Dame	0

Semifinals; April 7
MW1	Michigan (1)	2
W1	Denver (4)	3*
NE2	Minnesota	1
E1	Minnesota State (2)	5

Championship; April 9
W1	Denver (4)	5
E1	Minnesota State (2)	1

* denotes overtime period

== Awards ==
=== NCAA ===
Award		Recipient
Hobey Baker Award		Dryden McKay, Minnesota State
Spencer Penrose Award		Mike Hastings, Minnesota State
Tim Taylor Award		Devon Levi, Northeastern
Mike Richter Award		Devon Levi, Northeastern
Derek Hines Unsung Hero Award		Jordan Seyfert, Merrimack
Senior CLASS Award		Zach Driscoll, North Dakota
Tournament Most Outstanding Player		Michael Benning, Denver
AHCA All-American Teams
East First Team	Position	West First Team
Devon Levi, Northeastern	G	Dryden McKay, Minnesota State
Zach Metsa, Quinnipiac	D	Ronnie Attard, Western Michigan
Scott Morrow, Massachusetts	D	Jake Sanderson, North Dakota
Nick Abruzzese, Harvard	F	Matty Beniers, Michigan
Aidan McDonough, Northeastern	F	Bobby Brink, Denver
Bobby Trivigno, Massachusetts	F	Nathan Smith, Minnesota State
East Second Team	Position	West Second Team
Yaniv Perets, Quinnipiac	G	Ryan Fanti, Minnesota Duluth
Jordan Harris, Northeastern	D	Luke Hughes, Michigan
Henry Thrun, Harvard	D	Owen Power, Michigan
Colin Bilek, Army	F	Ethen Frank, Western Michigan
Jack McBain, Boston College	F	Brian Halonen, Michigan Tech
Ryan Tverberg, Connecticut	F	Ben Meyers, Minnesota

=== Atlantic Hockey ===
Award		Recipient
Player of the Year		Chris Theodore, American International
Rookie of the Year		Carter Wilkie, RIT
Best Defensive Forward		Jake Stella, American International
Best Defenseman		Zak Galambos, American International
Individual Sportsmanship Award		Daniel Haider, Army
Regular Season Scoring Trophy		Colin Bilek, Army
Regular Season Scoring Trophy		Neil Shea, Sacred Heart
Regular Season Goaltending Award		Jake Kucharski, American International
Coach of the Year		Eric Lang, American International
Tournament MVP		Blake Bennett, American International
All-Atlantic Hockey Teams
First Team	Position	Second Team
Jacob Barczewski, Canisius	G	Gavin Abric, Army
Zak Galambos, American International	D	Anthony Firriolo, Army
Drew Bavaro, Bentley	D	Logan Britt, Sacred Heart
Chris Theodore, American International	F	Keaton Mastrodonato, Canisius
Colin Bilek, Army	F	Neil Shea, Sacred Heart
Will Calverley, RIT	F	Jake Stella, American International
Third Team	Position	Rookie Team
Jake Kucharski, American International	G	Tommy Scarfone, RIT
Brandon Koch, Air Force	D	Luis Lindner, American International
David Melaragni, Canisius	D	Mitchell Digby, Air Force
Braeden Tuck, Sacred Heart	F	Carter Wilkie, RIT
Carson Brière, Mercyhurst	F	Clayton Cosentino, Air Force
Ryan Leibold, Holy Cross	F	Shane Ott, Niagara

=== Big Ten ===
Award		Recipient
Player of the Year		Ben Meyers, Minnesota
Defensive Player of the Year		Brock Faber, Minnesota
Goaltender of the Year		Jakub Dobeš, Ohio State
Freshman of the Year		Jakub Dobeš, Ohio State
Freshman of the Year		Luke Hughes, Michigan
Scoring Champion		Matty Beniers, Michigan
Coach of the Year		Bob Motzko, Minnesota
Tournament Most Outstanding Player		Erik Portillo, Michigan
All-Big Ten Teams
First Team	Position	Second Team
Jakub Dobeš, Ohio State	G	Erik Portillo, Michigan
Owen Power, Michigan	D	Luke Hughes, Michigan
Brock Faber, Minnesota	D	Jackson LaCombe, Minnesota
Matty Beniers, Michigan	F	Brendan Brisson, Michigan
Ben Meyers, Minnesota	F	Matthew Knies, Minnesota
Georgii Merkulov, Ohio State	F	Max Ellis, Notre Dame
Freshman Team	Position	
Jakub Dobeš, Ohio State	G	
Luke Hughes, Michigan	D	
Mason Lohrei, Ohio State	D	
Matthew Knies, Minnesota	F	
Georgii Merkulov, Ohio State	F	
Mackie Samoskevich, Michigan	F	

=== CCHA ===
Award		Recipient
Player of the Year		Dryden McKay, Minnesota State
Forward of the Year		Nathan Smith, Minnesota State
Defenseman of the Year		Jake Livingstone, Minnesota State
Goaltender of the Year		Dryden McKay, Minnesota State
Rookie of the Year		Bradley Marek, Ferris State
Coach of the Year		Mike Hastings, Minnesota State
All-CCHA Teams
First Team	Position	Second Team
Dryden McKay, Minnesota State	G	Blake Pietila, Michigan Tech
Jake Livingstone, Minnesota State	D	Colin Swoyer, Michigan Tech
Elias Rosén, Bemidji State	D	Jacob Bengtsson, Lake Superior State
Nathan Smith, Minnesota State	F	Owen Sillinger, Bemidji State
Brian Halonen, Michigan Tech	F	Louis Boudon, Lake Superior State
Julian Napravnik, Minnesota State	F	Trenton Bliss, Michigan Tech
	F	AJ Vanderbeck, Northern Michigan
Rookie Team	Position	
Mattias Sholl, Bemidji State	G	
Charlie Glockner, Northern Michigan	G	
Eric Parker, Bowling Green	D	
Bennett Zmolek, Minnesota State	D	
Bradley Marek, Ferris State	F	
Austen Swankler, Bowling Green	F	
Josh Nixon, Lake Superior State	F	

=== ECAC Hockey ===
Award		Recipient
Player of the Year		Yaniv Perets, Quinnipiac
Best Defensive Forward		Zach Teskos, Clarkson
Best Defensive Defenseman		Zach Metsa, Quinnipiac
Rookie of the Year		Alex Laferriere, Harvard
Ken Dryden Award		Yaniv Perets, Quinnipiac
Student-Athlete of the Year		Josh Kosack, Union
Tim Taylor Award		Rand Pecknold, Quinnipiac
Most Outstanding Player in Tournament		Matthew Coronato, Harvard
All-ECAC Hockey Teams
First Team	Position	Second Team
Yaniv Perets, Quinnipiac	G	Mitchell Gibson, Harvard
Zach Metsa, Quinnipiac	D	Noah Beck, Clarkson
Sam Malinski, Cornell	D	Henry Thrun, Harvard
Alex Campbell, Clarkson	F	Zach Tsekos, Clarkson
Mathieu Gosselin, Clarkson	F	Ture Linden, Rensselaer
Nick Abruzzese, Harvard	F	Matt Stienburg, Cornell
Third Team	Position	Rookie Team
Clay Stevenson, Dartmouth	G	Clay Stevenson, Dartmouth
Brandon Estes, Union	D	Ian Moore, Harvard
Lukas Kälble, Clarkson	D	Hank Kempf, Cornell
Alex Laferriere, Harvard	F	Alex Laferriere, Harvard
Max Andreev, Cornell	F	Ayrton Martino, Clarkson
Wyatt Bongiovanni, Quinnipiac	F	Matthew Coronato, Harvard

=== Hockey East ===
Award		Recipient
Player of the Year		Bobby Trivigno, Massachusetts
Best Defensive Forward		Jáchym Kondelík, Connecticut
Best Defensive Defenseman		Jordan Harris, Northeastern
Rookie of the Year		Devon Levi, Northeastern
Goaltending Champion		Devon Levi, Northeastern
Len Ceglarski Sportmanship Award		Jackson Pierson, New Hampshire
Three Stars Award		Devon Levi, Northeastern
Scoring Champion		Bobby Trivigno, Massachusetts
Charlie Holt Team Sportsmanship Award		Massachusetts
Bob Kullen Award (Coach of the Year)		Jerry Keefe, Northeastern
William Flynn Tournament Most Valuable Player		Bobby Trivigno, Massachusetts
All-Hockey East Teams
First Team	Position	Second Team
Devon Levi, Northeastern	G	Owen Savory, Massachusetts Lowell
Jordan Harris, Northeastern	D	Declan Carlile, Merrimack
Scott Morrow, Massachusetts	D	Domenick Fensore, Boston University
Aidan McDonough, Northeastern	F	Jáchym Kondelík, Connecticut
Bobby Trivigno, Massachusetts	F	Jack McBain, Boston College
Ryan Tverberg, Connecticut	F	Wilmer Skoog, Boston University
Third Team	Position	Rookie Team
Matt Murray, Massachusetts	G	Devon Levi, Northeastern
Max Crozier, Providence	D	Ty Gallagher, Boston University
Matthew Kessel, Massachusetts	D	Scott Morrow, Massachusetts
Jack St. Ivany, Boston College	D	Ryan Ufko, Massachusetts
	D	David Breazeale, Maine
Brett Berard, Providence	F	Matt Crasa, Massachusetts Lowell
Carl Berglund, Massachusetts Lowell	F	Justin Hryckowian, Northeastern
Andre Lee, Massachusetts Lowell	F	Jack Hughes, Northeastern

=== NCHC ===
Award		Recipient
Player of the Year		Bobby Brink, Denver
Rookie of the Year		Carter Mazur, Denver
Goaltender of the Year		Ryan Fanti, Minnesota Duluth
Forward of the Year		Bobby Brink, Denver
Defensive Defenseman of the Year		Ethan Frisch, North Dakota
Offensive Defenseman of the Year		Ronnie Attard, Western Michigan
Defensive Forward of the Year		Connor Ford, North Dakota
Scholar-Athlete of the Year		Drew Worrad, Western Michigan
Three Stars Award		Magnus Chrona, Denver
Sportsmanship Award		Mark Senden, North Dakota
Herb Brooks Coach of the Year		Brad Berry, North Dakota
Frozen Faceoff MVP		Ryan Fanti, Minnesota Duluth
All-NCHC Teams
First Team	Position	Second Team
Ryan Fanti, Minnesota Duluth	G	Zach Driscoll, North Dakota
Ronnie Attard, Western Michigan	D	Jake Sanderson, North Dakota
Nick Perbix, St. Cloud State	D	Michael Benning, Denver
Bobby Brink, Denver	F	Carter Savoie, Denver
Ethen Frank, Western Michigan	F	Drew Worrad, Western Michigan
Riese Gaber, North Dakota	F	Kevin Fitzgerald, St. Cloud State
Honorable Mention	Position	Rookie Team
Magnus Chrona, Denver	G	Jakob Hellsten, North Dakota
Brandon Scanlin, Omaha	D	Sean Behrens, Denver
Michael Joyaux, Western Michigan	D	Shai Buium, Denver
Cole Guttman, Denver	F	Carter Mazur, Denver
Noah Cates, Minnesota Duluth	F	Massimo Rizzo, Denver
Connor Ford, North Dakota	F	Matteo Costantini, North Dakota

== 2022 NHL entry draft ==
Round	Pick	Player	College	Conference	NHL team
1	3	Logan Cooley ^{†}	Minnesota	Big Ten	Arizona Coyotes
1	5	Cutter Gauthier ^{†}	Boston College	Hockey East	Philadelphia Flyers
1	13	Frank Nazar ^{†}	Michigan	Big Ten	Chicago Blackhawks
1	14	Rutger McGroarty ^{†}	Michigan	Big Ten	Winnipeg Jets
1	23	Jimmy Snuggerud ^{†}	Minnesota	Big Ten	St. Louis Blues
1	25	Sam Rinzel ^{†}	Minnesota	Big Ten	Chicago Blackhawks
1	31	Isaac Howard ^{†}	Minnesota Duluth	NCHC	Tampa Bay Lightning
2	34	Cameron Lund ^{†}	Northeastern	Hockey East	San Jose Sharks
2	37	Ryan Chesley ^{†}	Minnesota	Big Ten	Washington Capitals
2	40	Dylan James ^{†}	North Dakota	NCHC	Detroit Red Wings
2	46	Seamus Casey ^{†}	Michigan	Big Ten	New Jersey Devils
2	51	Jack Hughes	Northeastern	Hockey East	Los Angeles Kings
2	56	Rieger Lorenz ^{†}	Denver	NCHC	Minnesota Wild
2	57	Ryan Greene ^{†}	Boston University	Hockey East	Chicago Blackhawks
2	62	Lane Hutson ^{†}	Boston University	Hockey East	Montreal Canadiens
3	67	Miko Mitikka ^{†}	Denver	NCHC	Arizona Coyotes
3	69	Devin Kaplan ^{†}	Boston University	Hockey East	Philadelphia Flyers
3	76	Michael Fisher ^{†}	Princeton	ECAC Hockey	San Jose Sharks
3	78	Quinn Finley ^{†}	Wisconsin	Big Ten	New York Islanders
3	82	Adam Ingram ^{†}	St. Cloud State	NCHC	Nashville Predators
3	83	George Fegaras ^{†}	Cornell	ECAC Hockey	Dallas Stars
3	90	Aidan Thompson ^{†}	Denver	NCHC	Chicago Blackhawks
3	91	Ben MacDonald ^{†}	Harvard	ECAC Hockey	Seattle Kraken
3	95	Nicholas Moldenhauer ^{†}	Michigan	Big Ten	Toronto Maple Leafs
4	99	Garrett Brown ^{†}	Denver	NCHC	Winnipeg Jets
4	100	Tyson Jugnauth ^{†}	Wisconsin	Big Ten	Seattle Kraken
4	103	Kenny Connors ^{†}	Massachusetts	Hockey East	Los Angeles Kings
4	104	Stephen Halliday ^{†}	Ohio State	Big Ten	Ottawa Senators
4	111	Noah Laba ^{†}	Colgate	ECAC Hockey	New York Rangers
4	112	Daimon Gardner ^{†}	Clarkson	ECAC Hockey	Vancouver Canucks
4	114	Cole O'Hara ^{†}	Massachusetts	Hockey East	Nashville Predators
4	117	Cole Spicer ^{†}	North Dakota	NCHC	Boston Bruins
4	121	Ryan Healey ^{†}	Harvard	ECAC Hockey	Minnesota Wild
4	124	Cruz Lucius ^{†}	Wisconsin	Big Ten	Carolina Hurricanes
4	126	Charles Leddy ^{†}	Boston College	Hockey East	New Jersey Devils
4	128	Cameron Whitehead ^{†}	Northeastern	Hockey East	Vegas Golden Knights
5	131	Matthew Morden ^{†}	Harvard	ECAC Hockey	Arizona Coyotes
5	133	Alex Bump ^{†}	Vermont	Hockey East	Philadelphia Flyers
5	143	Cameron O'Neill ^{†}	Massachusetts	Hockey East	Ottawa Senators
5	150	Zam Plante ^{†}	Minnesota Duluth	NCHC	Pittsburgh Penguins
5	154	Michael Callow ^{†}	Harvard	ECAC Hockey	Anaheim Ducks
5	159	Vittorio Mancini	Omaha	NCHC	New York Rangers
6	162	Emmett Croteau ^{†}	Clarkson	ECAC Hockey	Montreal Canadiens
6	164	Barrett Hall ^{†}	St. Cloud State	NCHC	Seattle Kraken
6	165	Hunter McDonald ^{†}	Northeastern	Hockey East	Philadelphia Flyers
6	169	Jared Wright ^{†}	Colgate	ECAC Hockey	Los Angeles Kings
6	170	Jake Richard ^{†}	Connecticut	Hockey East	Buffalo Sabres
6	172	Joey Muldowney ^{†}	Connecticut	Hockey East	San Jose Sharks
6	173	Dominic James	Minnesota Duluth	NCHC	Chicago Blackhawks
6	176	Jackson Dorrington ^{†}	Northeastern	Hockey East	Vancouver Canucks
6	180	Jack Sparkes ^{†}	Michigan State	Big Ten	Los Angeles Kings
6	182	Luke Devlin ^{†}	Cornell	ECAC Hockey	Pittsburgh Penguins
6	189	Tyler Muszelik ^{†}	New Hampshire	Hockey East	Florida Panthers
6	191	Zakary Karpa	Harvard	ECAC Hockey	New York Rangers
6	192	Connor Kurth ^{†}	Minnesota	Big Ten	Tampa Bay Lightning
6	193	Chris Romaine ^{†}	Providence	Hockey East	Colorado Avalanche
7	195	Eli Barnett ^{†}	Vermont	Hockey East	San Jose Sharks
7	201	Owen Mehlenbacher ^{†}	Wisconsin	Big Ten	Detroit Red Wings
7	203	James Fisher ^{†}	Northeastern	Hockey East	Columbus Blue Jackets
7	204	Adam Zlnka ^{†}	Northeastern	Hockey East	Arizona Coyotes
7	206	Tyson Dyck ^{†}	Massachusetts	Hockey East	Ottawa Senators
7	209	Abram Wiebe ^{†}	North Dakota	NCHC	Vegas Golden Knights
7	210	Ben Striden ^{†}	North Dakota	NCHC	Nashville Predators
7	212	Brennan Ali ^{†}	Notre Dame	Big Ten	Detroit Red Wings
7	213	David Gucciardi	Michigan State	Big Ten	Washington Capitals
7	217	Reese Laubach ^{†}	Minnesota State	CCHA	San Jose Sharks
7	219	Cade Littler ^{†}	Minnesota State	CCHA	Calgary Flames
7	221	Jack Devine	Denver	NCHC	Florida Panthers
7	222	Joel Maatta	Vermont	Hockey East	Edmonton Oilers

† incoming freshman
Note: players who later became eligible for NCAA participation due to 2024 rule changes are not included.

== See also ==
- 2021–22 NCAA Division II men's ice hockey season
- 2021–22 NCAA Division III men's ice hockey season
