= Brian Halonen =

Canadian ice hockey player (born 1999)

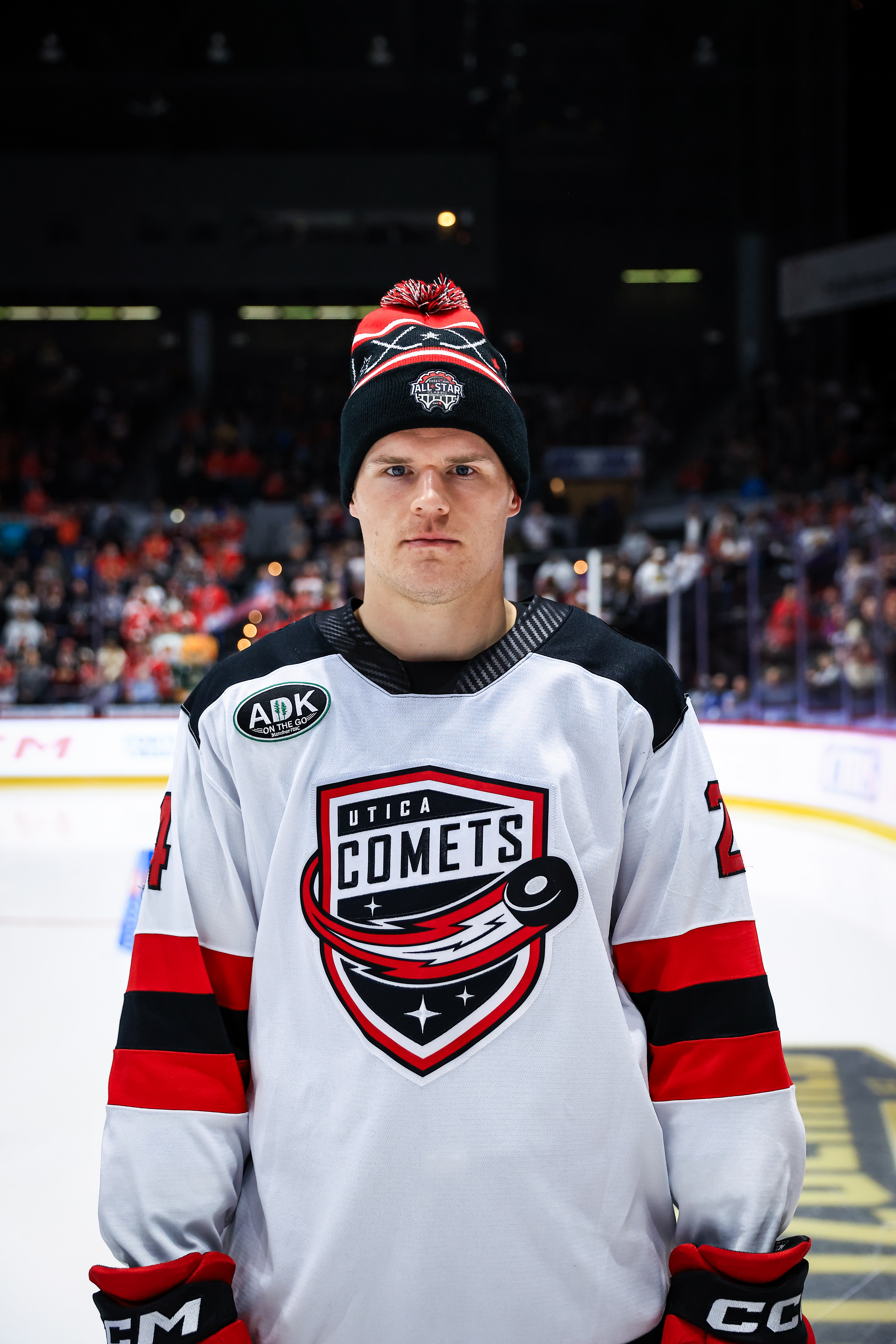
- Halonen with the Utica Comets in 2026
- Born: January 11, 1999 (age 27) Minneapolis, Minnesota, U.S.
- Height: 6 ft 0 in (183 cm)
- Weight: 207 lb (94 kg; 14 st 11 lb)
- Position: Left wing
- Shoots: Right
- NHL team (P) Cur. team Former teams: Boston Bruins; Providence Bruins (AHL); New Jersey Devils
- NHL draft: Undrafted
- Playing career: 2022–present

Brian Raymond Halonen (born January 11, 1999) is an American professional ice hockey player who is a left winger for the Providence Bruins of the American Hockey League (AHL) while under contract to the Boston Bruins of the National Hockey League (NHL). He played college ice hockey for Michigan Tech.

== Playing career ==
=== Collegiate ===
Halonen began his collegiate career for Michigan Tech during the 2018–19 season, where he recorded 12 goals and nine assists in 35 games. He led the Huskies and all Western Collegiate Hockey Association (WCHA) rookies with 12 goals. Following the season he was named to the All-WCHA Rookie Team and awarded the Norbert Matovich Memorial Outstanding Freshman Award. During the 2019–20 season in his sophomore year, he recorded 12 goals and 10 assists in 39 games, and ranked fourth on the team with 22 points. During the 2020–21 season in his junior year, he recorded eight goals and 10 assists in 28 games, and ranked third on the team with 18 points. He ranked sixth in the nation with four game-winning goals.

During the 2021–22 season in his senior year, he recorded 21 goals and 23 assists in 37 games. He led the Central Collegiate Hockey Association (CCHA) in points (36) and goals (16), and ranked fifth in the CCHA in assists (20) during conference games. He recorded six goals and eight assists with 45 shots on goal during the month of February. On February 11, 2022, he became the 68th player in program history to reach 100 points in a career. He was subsequently named the CCHA Forward of the Month.

During the regional semifinal of the 2022 NCAA tournament, Halonen was ejected from the game for a checking-from-behind penalty. The Huskies lost the game 3–0 to Minnesota Duluth, ending Halonen's collegiate career. Following an outstanding season, he was named a top-ten finalist for the Hobey Baker Award, becoming the fifth player in program history to be named a finalist for the award. He was also named to the All-CCHA First Team, and an American Hockey Coaches Association (AHCA) West Second Team All-American.

=== Professional ===
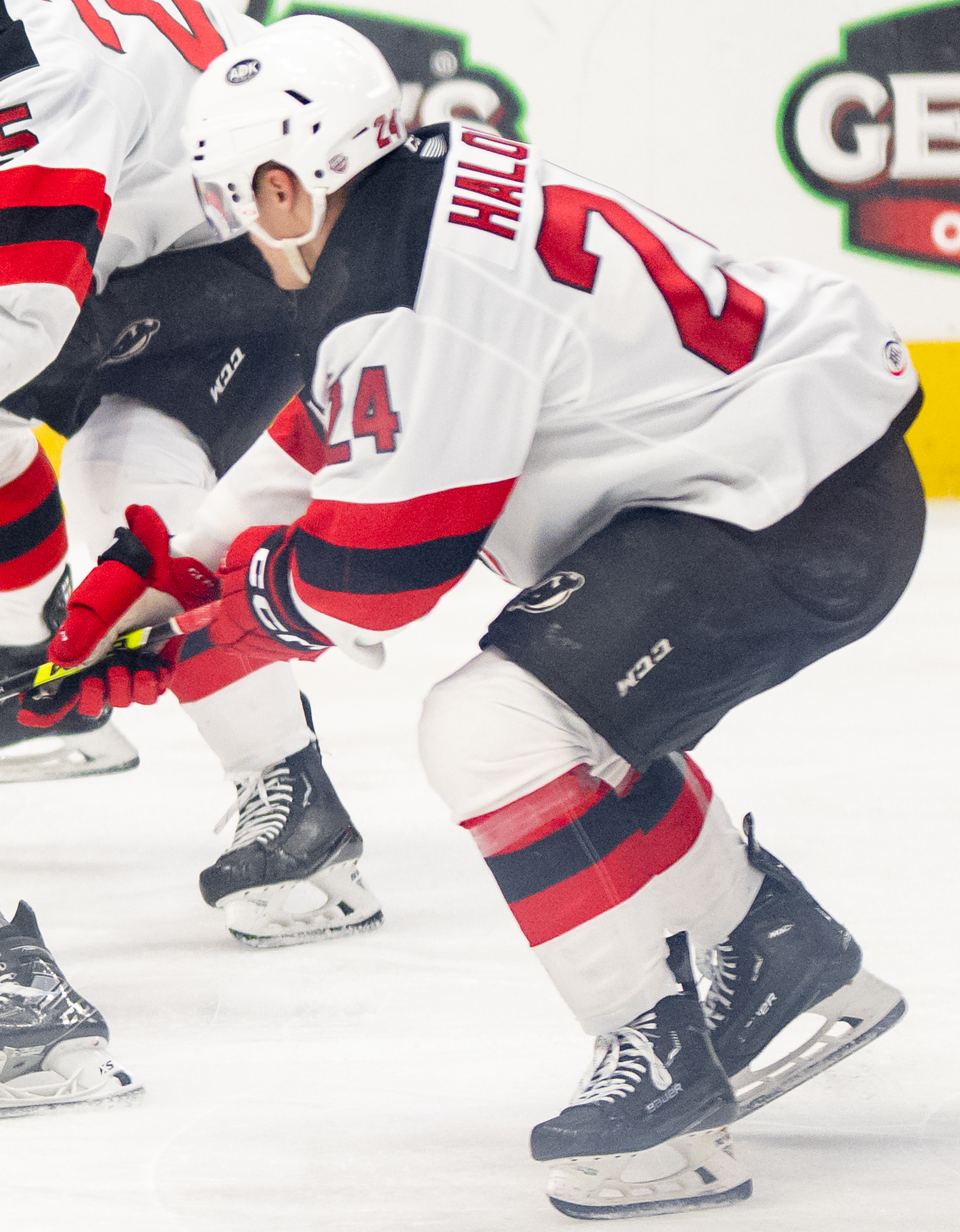
Halonen with the Utica Comets in 2023

On March 28, 2022, Halonen signed a two-year, entry-level contract with the New Jersey Devils beginning with the 2022–23 season. He was assigned to the Utica Comets, the American Hockey League (AHL) affiliate of New Jersey, on an amateur tryout contract for the remainder of the 2021–22 season. On April 2, he recorded his first professional goal in his second career game.

Halonen started the 2023–24 season on injured reserve. On December 30, 2023, he was activated from injured reserve and assigned to Utica. The Devils recalled Halonen on February 23, 2024, after Nathan Bastian was placed on injured reserve, and he made his NHL debut two days later, in a 4–1 loss to the Tampa Bay Lightning. He finished the AHL season with 20 goals and 29 points in 35 games, leading the Comets with nine power play goals.

On May 16, 2024, the Devils re-signed Halonen to a two-year, two-way contract with a $775,000 cap hit. On November 1, 2025, Halonen scored his first career NHL goal against the Los Angeles Kings finishing a short-angled shot.

On July 1, 2026, having left the Devils as a free agent following four full seasons within the organization, Halonen was signed to a two-year, two-way contract with the Boston Bruins.

== Personal life ==
Halonen has 10 siblings, an older sister and older brother, three younger sisters, and five younger brothers. He is the cousin of professional ice hockey player Blake Pietila. Halonen played high school hockey for Delano, Minnesota alongside current NHL player Ben Meyers of the Seattle Kraken.

== Career statistics ==
			Regular season					Playoffs
Season	Team	League	GP	G	A	Pts	PIM	GP	G	A	Pts	PIM
2016–17	Des Moines Buccaneers	USHL	8	2	0	2	0	—	—	—	—	—
2017–18	Des Moines Buccaneers	USHL	59	16	19	35	40	—	—	—	—	—
2018–19	Michigan Tech University	WCHA	35	12	9	21	26	—	—	—	—	—
2019–20	Michigan Tech University	WCHA	39	12	10	22	22	—	—	—	—	—
2020–21	Michigan Tech University	WCHA	28	8	10	18	16	—	—	—	—	—
2021–22	Michigan Tech University	CCHA	37	21	23	44	49	—	—	—	—	—
2021–22	Utica Comets	AHL	12	2	1	3	4	2	0	0	0	0
2022–23	Utica Comets	AHL	57	17	13	30	46	6	1	1	2	17
2022–23	Adirondack Thunder	ECHL	1	0	1	1	0	—	—	—	—	—
2023–24	Utica Comets	AHL	35	20	9	29	19	—	—	—	—	—
2023–24	New Jersey Devils	NHL	2	0	0	0	0	—	—	—	—	—
2024–25	Utica Comets	AHL	62	27	13	40	48	—	—	—	—	—
2024–25	New Jersey Devils	NHL	2	0	0	0	0	—	—	—	—	—
2025–26	Utica Comets	AHL	51	20	14	34	28	—	—	—	—	—
2025–26	New Jersey Devils	NHL	15	1	1	2	9	—	—	—	—	—
NHL totals			19	1	1	2	9	—	—	—	—	—

== Awards and honors ==
Award	Year	Ref
College
All-WCHA Rookie Team	2019	
All-CCHA First Team	2022	
AHCA West Second Team All-American	2022	
