= Magnus Chrona =

Swedish ice hockey player (born 2000)

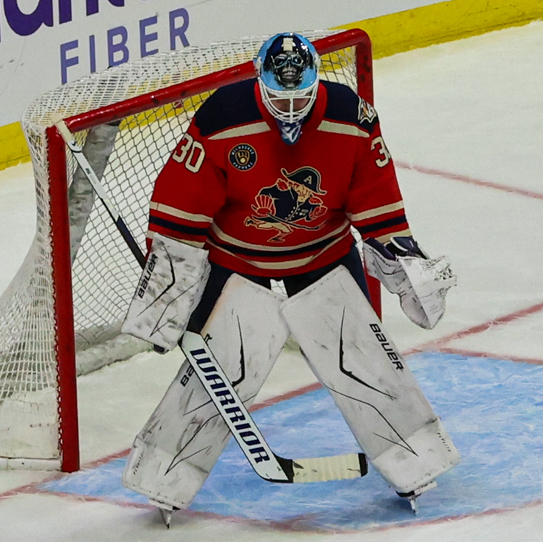
- Chrona with the Milwaukee Admirals in 2026
- Born: 28 August 2000 (age 25) Skellefteå, Sweden
- Height: 6 ft 4 in (193 cm)
- Weight: 194 lb (88 kg; 13 st 12 lb)
- Position: Goaltender
- Catches: Left
- SHL team Former teams: Brynäs IF; San Jose Sharks
- NHL draft: 152nd overall, 2018; Tampa Bay Lightning
- Playing career: 2023–present

Magnus Chrona (born 28 August 2000) is a Swedish professional ice hockey player who is a goaltender for Brynäs IF of the Swedish Hockey League (SHL). He was drafted 152nd overall in the fifth round of the 2018 NHL entry draft by the Tampa Bay Lightning, and has previously played for the San Jose Sharks.

== Early life ==
Chrona was born on 28 August 2000, in Skellefteå, Sweden to parents Annika and Bjorn.

== Playing career ==
Growing up in Sweden, Chrona played for the Skellefteå AIK junior team and Nacka HK junior under-18 team. During the 2017–18 season with Nacka HK in the J18 Allsvenskan league, Chrona recorded a 1.14 goals against average (GAA) and .954 save percentage (SV%) through seven games. Following the 2017–18 season, Chrona was drafted in the fifth round of the 2018 NHL entry draft by the Tampa Bay Lightning and attended their summer development camp. He then returned to Sweden and posted a 4.00 GAA and .889 SV% through 26 games for the Skellefteå AIK under-20 team. Following the 2018–19 season, Chrona enrolled at the University of Denver to play for the Denver Pioneers men's ice hockey team for the 2019–20 season. He also participated in his second Tampa Bay Lightning summer development camp.

=== Collegiate ===
Chrona made his collegiate debut on 5 October 2019, against the Alaska Fairbanks Nanooks, where he earned his first collegiate win. He subsequently started the following five games for the Pioneers, winning all of them and posting a 1.83 GAA and .930 SV%. During this period, Chrona recorded two shutouts to become one of only five goaltenders with two shutouts by 3 November. His six consecutive wins to start the season earned him recognition as the NCHC Goalie of the Month for October. As the season continued, Chrona split his time in net with Devin Cooley and accumulated a 7–4–2 record by early December. However, once Cooley suffered a lower-body injury, Chrona became their de facto starting goaltender. By the end of January, Chrona ranked second among NCAA freshmen with 13 wins and a 2.18 GAA. Chrona was recognized as the NCHC Rookie of the Week for the week ending on 9 March after he earned a tie and a win in back-to-back games against Colorado College. As the COVID-19 pandemic caused the early ending of the 2019–20 season, Chrona finished the season with a 16–6–4 record and was named to the NCHC All-Rookie Team. He ranked third among all NCAA freshmen with a 2.15 GAA and ranked first with a .920 SV%.

Due to his successful freshman season, Chrona was named to the 2020 NCHC Preseason All-Conference Team by members of the media. As the COVID-19 pandemic continued, the 2020–21 season was delayed. Chrona earned his first conference honor of the season on 1 March after winning earning two wins in back-to-back games against Colorado College. Throughout the season, Chrona failed to match his freshman season total and he finished the regular season with a 7–11–0 record, .907 GAA, and 2.47 SV%. Denver head coach David Carle explained the dip as a result of disruptions from the COVID-19 pandemic. On 10 April, Chrona's playing rights were traded to the San Jose Sharks in exchange for Fredrik Claesson.

Chrona experienced a breakout season in his junior year as he led the Pioneers to their record-tying ninth national championship. From 5 November to 25 February, Chrona started 25 consecutive games where he set numerous personal records. After earning six consecutive wins to start December for a 9–3–0 record, Chrona was recognized with the NCHC Goaltender of the Week Award for the week ending on 6 December. Later that month, he earned 10 consecutive wins and one win for a career-high 11-game streak between 31 December and 11 February. During this streak, he also recorded three straight shutouts from 16 to 22 January to become the second goaltender in program history to reach this milestone. His streak was also the sixth-longest in NCHC history as it reached 183:16. His shutout streak ended at 198:10, marking the third-longest in school history and the first since Marc Cheverie in 2009. Chrona finished the month with NCHC Goaltender of the Month honors after posting a 6–0–1 record, 1.67 GAA and .920 SV% over seven starts. He was also named to the 'Watch List' for the 2022 Mike Richter Award as the top goaltender in men's NCAA Division I hockey. On 7 April, during the 2022 Frozen Four semifinals, Chrona earned his 50th career win in a 3–2 overtime win against the Michigan Wolverines. He later made 27 saves to help the Pioneers defeat Minnesota State in the NCAA Championship Final to win their ninth title in program history.

As Chrona remained unsigned to an NHL team, he returned to the Denver Pioneers for his senior season. Due to his successful freshman season, Chrona was named to the 2022 NCHC Preseason All-Conference Team by members of the media. He earned his first shutout of the season on 28 October against the Miami University RedHawks in their conference opener. This marked his 10th career NCAA shutout and tied him with Marc Cheverie for the fourth-most in program history. Along with his shutout, Chrona made 18 saves the following night to result in a series sweep against the RedHawks, which earned him NCHC Goaltender of the Week honors. On 13 January, Chrona made his 100th career start for the Pioneers and became one of eight goalies to reach this milestone in program history. He made all 20 saves during the game to clinch his 11th career shutout and take sole possession of fourth place in career shutouts with the Pioneers. He then surpassed this record with a shutout the following game to tie Adam Berkhoel for third place in program history and second-most in NCHC history. As a result of his accomplishments, Chrona was recognized with the NCHC Goaltender of the Week honor for the week ending on 16 January. Later that month, Chrona recorded his fourth shutout of the season and the 13th of his career to surpass Berkhoel and clinch second all-time in program history.

By mid-February, Chrona had posted a 19–7–0 record over 26 starts with the Pioneers and recorded a .916 CV% and 2.14 GAA. As a result, he was named a finalist for the Mike Richter Award as the top goaltender in men's NCAA Division I hockey. While he did not win the Mike Richter Award, Chrona was named to the NCHC 2022–23 Academic All-Conference Team and earned NCHC Distinguished Scholar-Athlete honors. Chrona finished the regular season with a 22–9–0 record, a 2.19 GAA, and .916 SV%. As a result, he was honored with the NCHC's Goaltender of the Year award and Three Stars Award. He finished collegiate career with a career total of 73 wins, the fourth-most in the program's history.

=== Professional ===
Chrona officially concluded his collegiate career by signing a two-year, entry-level contract with the Sharks on 10 April 2023. Following the signing, he attended the Sharks' training camp before being reassigned to their American Hockey League (AHL) affiliate, the San Jose Barracuda, to start the 2023–24 season. Chrona played four games with the Barracuda before being recalled to the NHL on 3 November. He made his NHL debut the following night as a reliever for Mackenzie Blackwood against the Pittsburgh Penguins. Chrona allowed four goals on 17 shots as the Sharks lost 10–2 for their 11th straight loss. Chrona made his first career NHL start on 28 December against the Edmonton Oilers but was pulled after allowing four goals on 11 shots. Chrona earned his first career NHL win on 9 March 2024, after stopping 31 of 32 shots against the Ottawa Senators in a 2–1 win.

During the 2024 offseason, Chrona was traded to the Nashville Predators, alongside David Edstrom and a conditional 1st-round pick in 2025, in exchange for Yaroslav Askarov, Nolan Burke, and a 3rd-round pick in 2025.

At the conclusion of his second season within the Predators organization, having played exclusively with AHL affiliate, the Milwaukee Admirals, Chrona as a pending restricted free agent opted to return to Sweden in signing a two-year contract with Brynäs IF of the SHL on 19 May 2026. A month later, on 16 June, Chrona's NHL rights were traded by the Predators to the Colorado Avalanche, alongside third-round picks in 2026 and 2027, in exchange for Ross Colton and Isak Posch.

== Career statistics ==
			Regular season									Playoffs
Season	Team	League	GP	W	L	T/OT	MIN	GA	SO	GAA	SV%	GP	W	L	MIN	GA	SO	GAA	SV%
2018–19	Skellefteå AIK J20	J20	26	8	18	0	1,589	106	0	4.00	.889	—	—	—	—	—	—	—	—
2019–20	University of Denver	NCHC	27	16	6	4	1,593	57	2	2.15	.920	—	—	—	—	—	—	—	—
2020–21	University of Denver	NCHC	18	7	11	0	1,044	43	1	2.47	.907	—	—	—	—	—	—	—	—
2021–22	University of Denver	NCHC	37	28	8	1	2,187	77	6	2.11	.911	—	—	—	—	—	—	—	—
2022–23	University of Denver	NCHC	32	22	9	0	1,862	68	4	2.19	.916	—	—	—	—	—	—	—	—
2023–24	San Jose Barracuda	AHL	31	6	17	6	1,755	102	0	3.49	.894	—	—	—	—	—	—	—	—
2023–24	San Jose Sharks	NHL	9	1	6	1	471	37	0	4.71	.859	—	—	—	—	—	—	—	—
2023–24	Wichita Thunder	ECHL	2	0	1	1	122	6	0	2.94	.940	—	—	—	—	—	—	—	—
2024–25	Milwaukee Admirals	AHL	30	12	11	5	1712	80	0	2.80	.903	1	0	0	10	1	0	5.73	.500
2025–26	Milwaukee Admirals	AHL	25	9	11	3	1430	70	1	2.94	.894	—	—	—	—	—	—	—	—
NHL totals			9	1	6	1	471	37	0	4.71	.859	—	—	—	—	—	—	—	—

Awards and achievements
Preceded by Ryan Fanti	NCHC Goaltender of the Year; 2022–23	Succeeded by Kaidan Mbereko
Preceded by Ludvig Persson	NCHC Three Stars Award; 2021–22, 2022–23	Succeeded by Noah Laba
