= Ryan Fanti =

Canadian ice hockey player (born 1999)

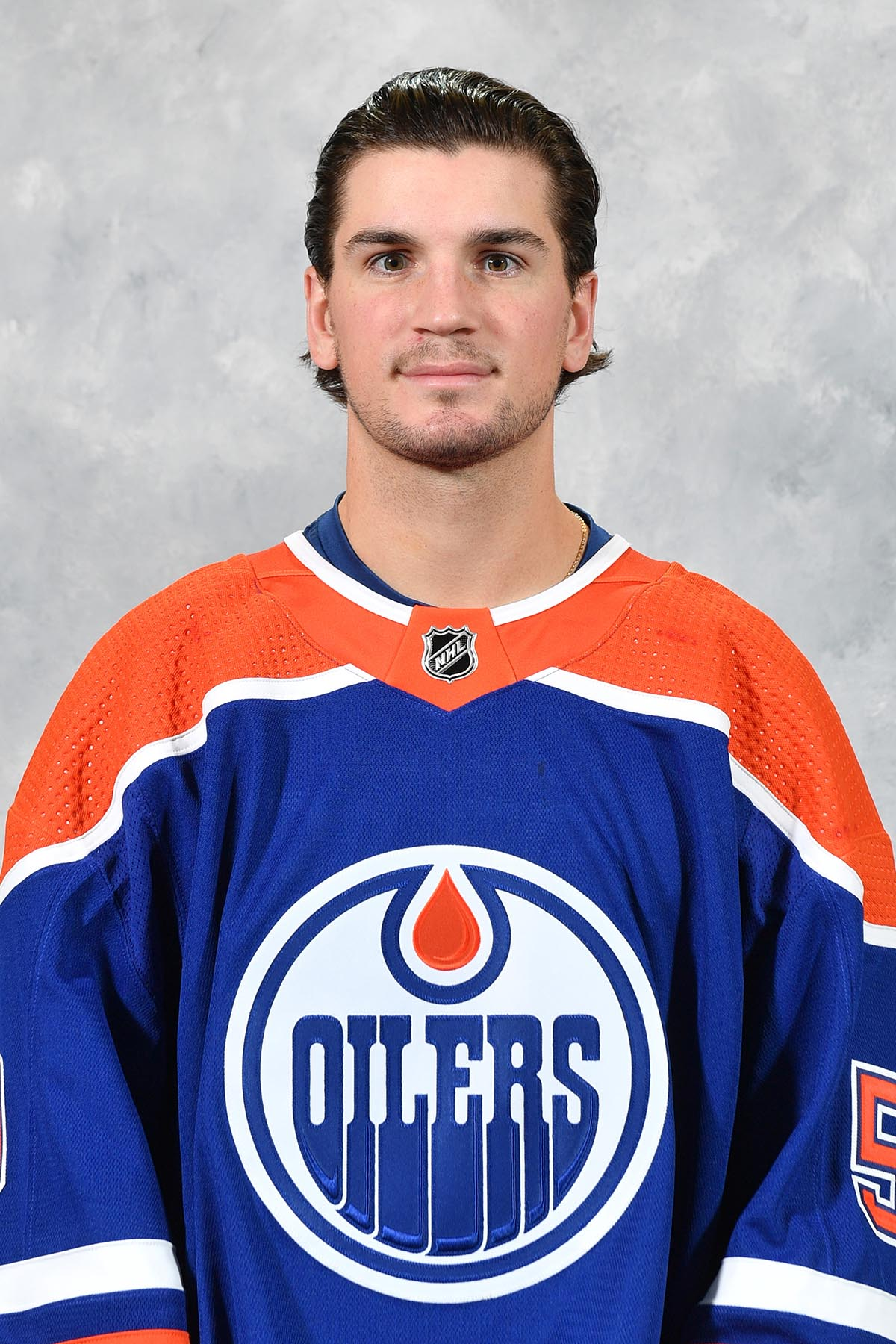
- Fanti with the Edmonton Oilers in 2022
- Born: October 3, 1999 (age 26) Thunder Bay, Ontario, Canada
- Height: 6 ft 3 in (191 cm)
- Weight: 195 lb (88 kg; 13 st 13 lb)
- Position: Goaltender
- Catches: Left
- AHL team Former teams: Hamilton Hammers; Bakersfield Condors; Syracuse Crunch
- NHL draft: Undrafted
- Playing career: 2022–present

Ryan Fanti (born October 3, 1999) is a Canadian professional ice hockey goaltender for the Hamilton Hammers of the American Hockey League (AHL). He played college ice hockey for Minnesota Duluth.

== Playing career ==
=== Collegiate ===
Fanti began his collegiate career for Minnesota Duluth during the 2019–20 season, however, he did not appear in any games. During the 2020–21 season, he appeared in 20 games, with 19 starts, and posted a 10–6–2 record with a 2.40 goals against average (GAA) and .907 save percentage.

During the 2021–22 season he posted a 20–12–4 record with a 1.83 GAA and .929 save percentage. He ranked second in conference-only save percentage at .918 and first with a 2.13 GAA in 23 starts. Fanti was named the NCHC Goaltender of the Month and Hockey Commissioners Association's National Goaltender of the Month for the month of November. He started all eight games for the Bulldogs, while posting a 5–2–1 record with four shutouts, a .957 save percentage and 1.00 GAA, ranking him top five in the nation in both statistics. He became the first Bulldogs player to record three consecutive shutouts since Hunter Shepard during the 2017–18 season.

During the 2022 NCHC Tournament he posted consecutive shutouts in the semifinals and championship game, to help the Bulldogs advance to the 2022 NCAA Tournament. He was subsequently named to the NCHC All-Tournament Team and named the Frozen Faceoff MVP. Following an outstanding season, he was named to the All-NCHC First Team and NCHC Goaltender of the Year. He was also named a Mike Richter Award semifinalist and an AHCA West Second Team All-American.

=== Professional ===
On March 28, 2022, Fanti signed a two-year contract with the Edmonton Oilers beginning with the 2022–23 season. He was assigned to the Fort Wayne Komets of the ECHL on an amateur tryout contract for the remainder of the 2021–22 season.

On March 26, 2023, in a game against the Rapid City Rush, Fanti scored an empty-net goal. He became the 15th goaltender in ECHL history to score a goal and the first goaltender in the Komets' 71-year history to do so.

At the conclusion of his contract with the Oilers, Fanti left as a free agent and was signed to a one-year AHL contract with the Syracuse Crunch for the 2024–25 season on July 2, 2024. Following the season, the Tampa Bay Lightning signed Fanti to a one-year, two-way contract.

As a free agent from the Lightning, Fanti was to a one-year contract to continue his tenure in the AHL with the Hamilton Hammers, affiliate to the New York Islanders on July 19, 2026.

== Career statistics ==
			Regular season									Playoffs
Season	Team	League	GP	W	L	T/OT	MIN	GA	SO	GAA	SV%	GP	W	L	MIN	GA	SO	GAA	SV%
2017–18	Minnesota Wilderness	NAHL	36	18	9	0	1,797	78	2	2.60	.922	—	—	—	—	—	—	—	—
2018–19	Minnesota Wilderness	NAHL	39	19	18	2	2,333	105	3	2.70	.917	—	—	—	—	—	—	—	—
2020–21	University of Minnesota Duluth	NCHC	20	11	7	2	1,170	46	0	2.36	.907	—	—	—	—	—	—	—	—
2021–22	University of Minnesota Duluth	NCHC	37	20	12	4	2,201	67	7	1.83	.929	—	—	—	—	—	—	—	—
2021–22	Bakersfield Condors	AHL	1	1	0	0	60	5	0	5.00	.878	—	—	—	—	—	—	—	—
2022–23	Fort Wayne Komets	ECHL	34	15	16	1	1,976	115	0	3.49	.894	6	3	3	355	8	2	1.35	.959
2022–23	Bakersfield Condors	AHL	8	0	5	1	388	24	0	3.71	.884	—	—	—	—	—	—	—	—
2023–24	Fort Wayne Komets	ECHL	17	9	6	2	959	44	2	2.75	.915	—	—	—	—	—	—	—	—
2024–25	Orlando Solar Bears	ECHL	37	18	13	5	2151	97	1	2.71	.907	4	1	2	202	7	0	2.08	.935
2024–25	Syracuse Crunch	AHL	7	3	1	0	330	8	0	1.45	.946	—	—	—	—	—	—	—	—
2025–26	Syracuse Crunch	AHL	27	13	12	1	1544	62	2	2.41	.905	—	—	—	—	—	—	—	—
AHL totals			43	17	18	2	2,322	99	2	2.56	.905	—	—	—	—	—	—	—	—

== Awards and honours ==
Award	Year
College
All-NCHC First Team	2022
NCHC Goaltender of the Year	2022
NCHC All-Tournament Team	2022
Frozen Faceoff MVP	2022
AHCA West Second Team All-American	2022

Awards and achievements
Preceded by Adam Scheel	NCHC Goaltender of the Year; 2021–22	Succeeded by Magnus Chrona
Preceded by Riese Gaber	Frozen Faceoff MVP; 2022	Succeeded by Jami Krannila
