= Cole Guttman =

American ice hockey player (born 1999)

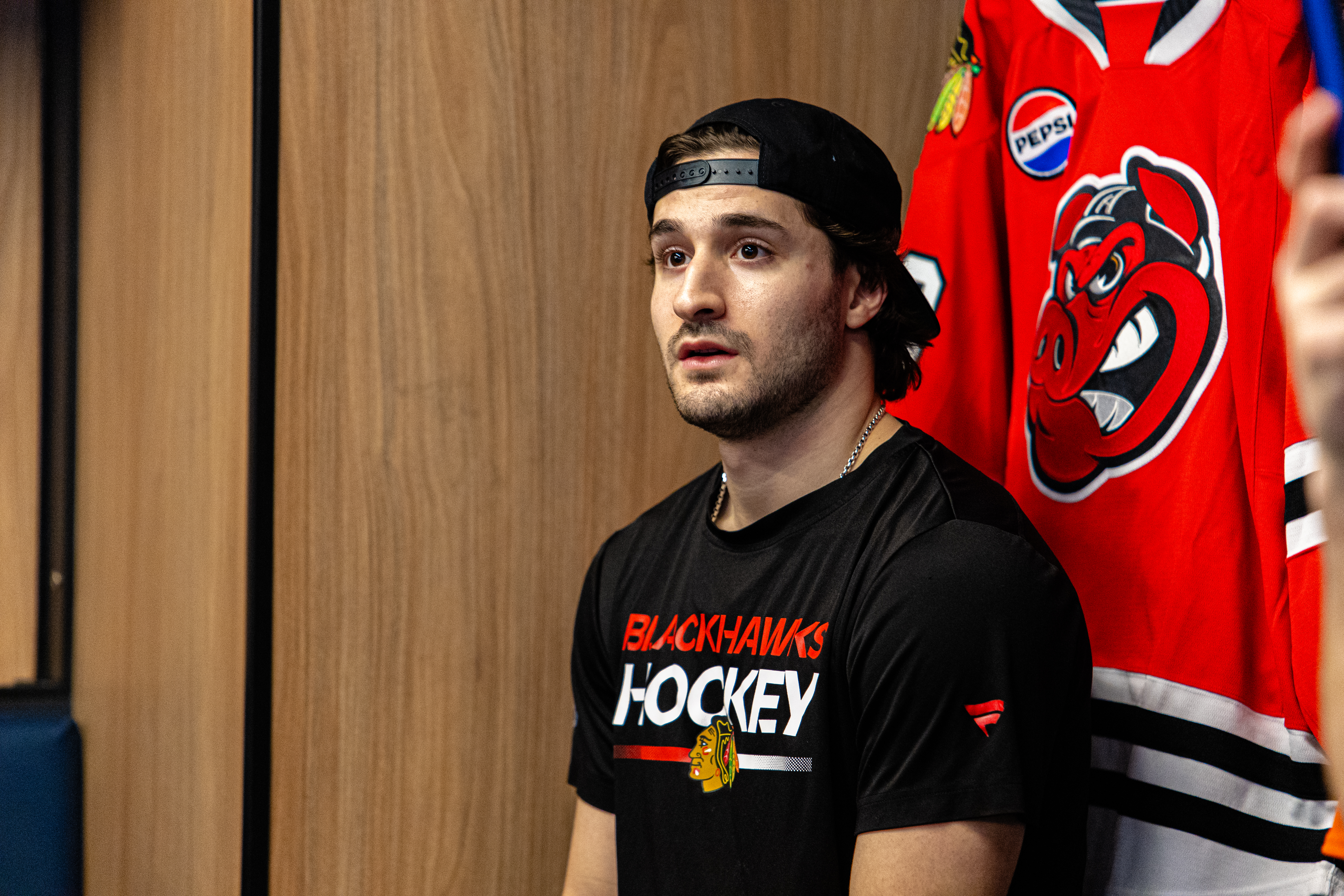
- Cole Guttman in a locker room for the 2025 AHL All-Star Classic
- Born: April 6, 1999 (age 27) Northridge, California, U.S.
- Height: 5 ft 10 in (178 cm)
- Weight: 181 lb (82 kg; 12 st 13 lb)
- Position: Center
- Shoots: Right
- NHL team (P) Cur. team Former teams: Los Angeles Kings; Ontario Reign (AHL); Chicago Blackhawks
- NHL draft: 180th overall, 2017; Tampa Bay Lightning
- Playing career: 2022–present

Cole Guttman (born April 6, 1999) is an American professional ice hockey center for the Ontario Reign of the American Hockey League (AHL) while under contract to the Los Angeles Kings of the National Hockey League (NHL).

== Playing career ==
Growing up in Los Angeles, Guttman played youth hockey for several local California-based minor teams before eventually working his way up to the Dubuque Fighting Saints of the United States Hockey League. In his first full season with the Fighting Saints, Guttman scored 54 points in 53 games, catching the attention of the Tampa Bay Lightning, who drafted him in the sixth round of the 2017 NHL entry draft. Guttman was named captain of Dubuque prior to his selection in the NHL draft; his sophomore USHL season saw a decrease in production. Although initially committed to the St. Cloud University, Guttmann ultimately enrolled at the University of Denver in 2018, where he played for the school's Pioneers ice hockey club for all four years of his schooling. In 2021, he served as captain of the Pioneers. In his final season with Denver, he captained the team to the 2022 NCAA championship.

Tampa Bay did not sign Guttman to a contract prior to his rights expiring on August 15, 2022, making Guttman an unrestricted free agent. On August 18, Guttman inked a two-year, entry-level contract with the Chicago Blackhawks worth $950,000 annually, the maximum allowable on rookie contracts. Chicago, who at the time was considered to have a weak forward prospect pool, were intrigued by Guttman's potential NHL ceiling.

Guttman was assigned to Chicago's American Hockey League affiliate team, the Rockford Icehogs, for his first professional season. He would collect 30 points in 39 games with the Icehogs before being called up by the Blackhawks on February 15, 2023, amid a flurry of recent injuries for the club. He made his NHL debut that evening, playing just over twelve minutes in a loss to the Toronto Maple Leafs. On February 20, in his third career game, Guttman scored his first NHL goal again in a match against the Toronto Maple Leafs. Guttman appeared in 14 games with the Blackhawks, registering four goals and six points, before undergoing season-ending shoulder surgery on March 14.

As a free agent after three seasons within the Blackhawks organization, Guttman was signed to a two-year, two-way contract with the Los Angeles Kings on July 2, 2025.

== Personal life ==
Guttman's family were originally from Hungary. After surviving the Holocaust, the Guttmans made their way to North America via a displaced persons camp.

Cole was born in Los Angeles, to parents Brent and Julie Guttman, and is Jewish. He has a younger brother, Jeremy, who attended the University of Michigan. Guttman's favourite musical artist is Post Malone. He is a fan of the Los Angeles Dodgers.

== Career statistics ==
			Regular season					Playoffs
Season	Team	League	GP	G	A	Pts	PIM	GP	G	A	Pts	PIM
2014–15	Los Angeles Jr. Kings U16	T1EHL	24	9	16	25	16	4	0	3	3	14
2015–16	Los Angeles Jr. Kings U16	T1EHL	30	24	24	48	34	4	3	2	5	6
2015–16	U.S. National Development Team	USHL	3	0	0	0	0	—	—	—	—	—
2015–16	Dubuque Fighting Saints	USHL	2	0	1	1	0	8	0	0	0	0
2016–17	Dubuque Fighting Saints	USHL	53	27	27	54	18	6	1	3	4	2
2017–18	Dubuque Fighting Saints	USHL	17	6	5	11	21	—	—	—	—	—
2018–19	University of Denver	NCHC	41	14	12	26	18	—	—	—	—	—
2019–20	University of Denver	NCHC	35	14	14	28	22	—	—	—	—	—
2020–21	University of Denver	NCHC	23	8	14	22	12	—	—	—	—	—
2021–22	University of Denver	NCHC	41	19	26	45	26	—	—	—	—	—
2022–23	Rockford IceHogs	AHL	39	16	14	30	26	—	—	—	—	—
2022–23	Chicago Blackhawks	NHL	14	4	2	6	2	—	—	—	—	—
2023–24	Chicago Blackhawks	NHL	27	4	4	8	7	—	—	—	—	—
2023–24	Rockford IceHogs	AHL	39	16	24	40	30	—	—	—	—	—
2024–25	Rockford IceHogs	AHL	70	23	34	57	36	7	0	5	5	4
2025–26	Ontario Reign	AHL	67	24	29	53	52	5	1	0	1	12
NHL totals			41	8	6	14	9	—	—	—	—	—

== Awards and honours ==
Award	Year
USHL
All-Rookie Team	2017
College
NCAA Championship (Denver Pioneers)	2022

== See also ==
- List of select Jewish ice hockey players
