= Nick Perbix =

American ice hockey player (born 1998)

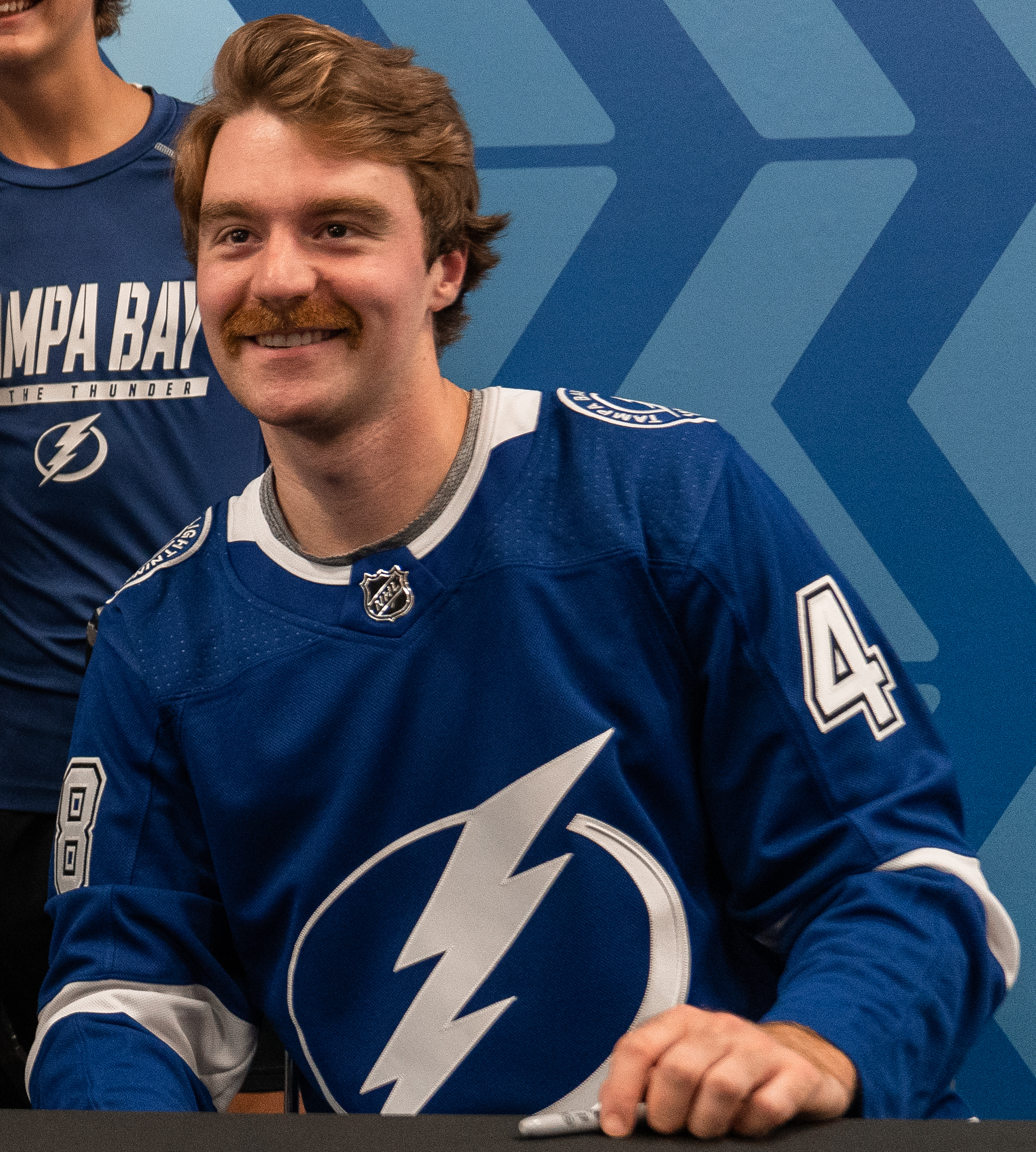
- Perbix in 2022
- Born: June 15, 1998 (age 28) Elk River, Minnesota, U.S.
- Height: 6 ft 3 in (191 cm)
- Weight: 202 lb (92 kg; 14 st 6 lb)
- Position: Defense
- Shoots: Right
- NHL team Former teams: Nashville Predators; Tampa Bay Lightning
- National team: United States
- NHL draft: 169th overall, 2017; Tampa Bay Lightning
- Playing career: 2022–present

Nicklaus Perbix (born June 15, 1998) is an American professional ice hockey player who is a defenseman for the Nashville Predators of the National Hockey League (NHL). He was a member of United States national team at the 2022 Winter Olympics.

== Playing career ==
Perbix was a star player for Elk River High School, scoring well over a point per game as a senior and being a finalist for the Mr. Hockey Award. After being selected by the Tampa Bay Lightning in the NHL Draft, he played a season of junior hockey for the Omaha Lancers before he began attending St. Cloud State University. He made an immediate splash in the college ranks, helping the Huskies finish atop the NCHC standings, and was named to the conference All-Rookie team. After his sophomore season was cut short due to the COVID-19 pandemic, Perbix came back the following year in good form and was instrumental in getting St. Cloud to the program's first NCAA championship appearance.

Perbix continued to increase his scoring output for his senior season and was firing at a point per game pace for most of the year. After the NHL announced that they would not be sending any players to the Winter Olympics due to the COVID-19 pandemic, Perbix was selected as a member of the United States team. On March 31, 2022, the Tampa Bay Lightning signed Perbix to a one-year, entry-level contract commencing in the 2022–23 season. He was immediately assigned to join AHL affiliate, the Syracuse Crunch, on an amateur tryout contract for the remainder of the season.

In the 2022–23 season, on October 18, 2022, Perbix made his NHL debut with the Tampa Bay Lightning in a loss to the visiting Philadelphia Flyers at Amalie Arena. On October 26, 2022, Perbix recorded his first career NHL assist and point in a 4–2 victory over the Anaheim Ducks at the Honda Center. On November 5, 2022, Perbix scored his first career NHL goal in a 5–3 Lightning win over the Buffalo Sabres. Establishing his role on Lightning's blueline, on January 2, 2023, the Tampa Bay signed Perbix to a two-year extension that would keep him on the team through the 2024–25 season.

At the conclusion of his third season within the Lightning organization, Perbix left as a free agent and was signed to a two-year, $5.5 million contract with the Nashville Predators on July 1, 2025.

== Career statistics ==
=== Regular season and playoffs ===
			Regular season					Playoffs
Season	Team	League	GP	G	A	Pts	PIM	GP	G	A	Pts	PIM
2017–18	Omaha Lancers	USHL	56	4	25	29	38	4	0	2	2	14
2018–19	St. Cloud State	NCHC	39	5	15	20	16	—	—	—	—	—
2019–20	St. Cloud State	NCHC	34	4	11	15	25	—	—	—	—	—
2020–21	St. Cloud State	NCHC	31	7	16	23	16	—	—	—	—	—
2021–22	St. Cloud State	NCHC	31	6	25	31	14	—	—	—	—	—
2021–22	Syracuse Crunch	AHL	12	2	6	8	2	5	0	1	1	0
2022–23	Syracuse Crunch	AHL	2	0	0	0	0	—	—	—	—	—
2022–23	Tampa Bay Lightning	NHL	69	5	15	20	22	6	0	3	3	0
2023–24	Tampa Bay Lightning	NHL	77	2	22	24	10	2	0	0	0	2
2024–25	Tampa Bay Lightning	NHL	74	6	13	19	20	5	0	1	1	4
2025–26	Nashville Predators	NHL	79	3	10	13	20	—	—	—	—	—
NHL totals			299	16	60	76	72	13	0	4	4	6

=== International ===
Year	Team	Event	Result	GP	G	A	Pts	PIM
2022	United States	OG	5th	4	0	1	1	0
2023	United States	WC	4th	10	2	2	4	2
Senior totals				14	2	3	5	2

== Awards and honors ==
Award	Year	Ref
All-NCHC First Team	2021–22	
