= Ronnie Attard =

American ice hockey player (born 1999)

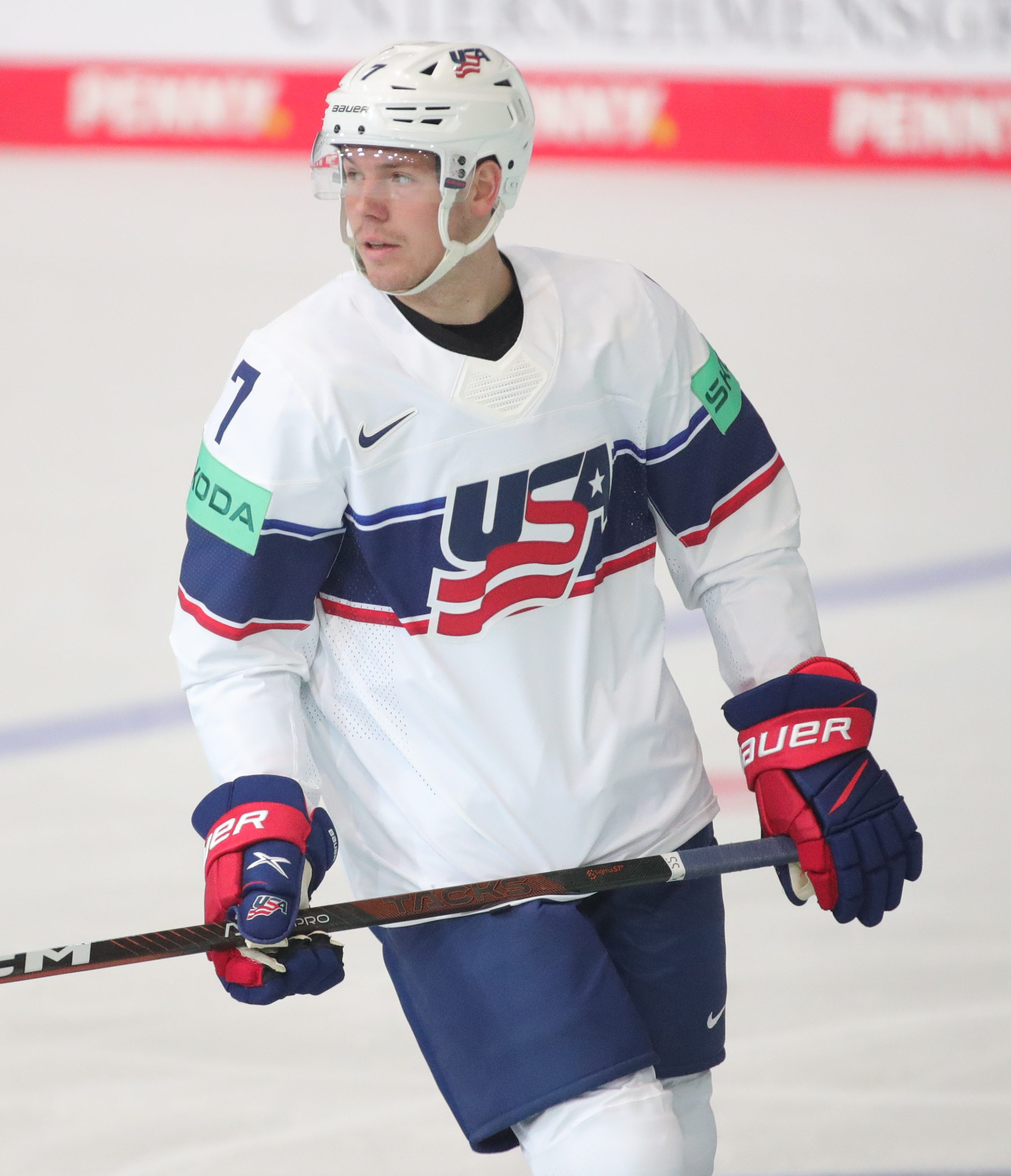
- Attard with Team USA in 2023
- Born: March 20, 1999 (age 27) White Lake Township, Michigan, U.S.
- Height: 6 ft 3 in (191 cm)
- Weight: 207 lb (94 kg; 14 st 11 lb)
- Position: Defense
- Shoots: Right
- NHL team (P) Cur. team Former teams: Detroit Red Wings; Grand Rapids Griffins (AHL); Philadelphia Flyers
- National team: United States
- NHL draft: 72nd overall, 2019; Philadelphia Flyers
- Playing career: 2022–present

Ronald Attard (born March 20, 1999) is an American professional ice hockey defenseman who is currently playing for the Grand Rapids Griffins of the American Hockey League (AHL) while under contract to the Detroit Red Wings of the National Hockey League (NHL). He was drafted 72nd overall by the Philadelphia Flyers in the 2019 NHL entry draft.

== Early life ==
Attard was born on March 20, 1999, in White Lake Township, Michigan, USA to parents Toms and Sue. He grew up alongside two older sisters; Jessica and Julia.

== Playing career ==
=== Amateur ===
Growing up in Michigan, Attard played minor ice hockey for the Honeybaked and Victory Honda before being drafted by the Tri-City Storm of the United States Hockey League (USHL). During his rookie season with the Storm, Attard announced his commitment to play NCAA Division I ice hockey with the Western Michigan Broncos men's ice hockey team.

Through the offseason prior to the 2018–19 season, Attard split his training between working out at Western Michigan with former NHL head coach Andy Murray and the Broncos. His offseason coaching caused Attard to endure a breakout season and win both the USHL Player and Defenseman of the Year. During the 2018–19 season, he set a league single-season record for most goals and points by a defenseman with 30 goals and 65 points. On the way to 30 goals, he also recorded a four-goal game, becoming the first USHL defenseman in more than three years to achieve this feat. As a result of his play as team captain, he won both the 2019 Dave Tyler Junior Player of the Year Award and USHL Defenseman of the Year award.

Leading up to the 2019 NHL entry draft, Attard was ranked 76th amongst all North American skaters by the NHL Central Scouting Bureau. He was eventually drafted in the third round, 72nd overall, by the Philadelphia Flyers.

Following the NHL entry draft, Attard began his freshman season at the Western Michigan University which was eventually cut short due to the COVID-19 pandemic. During the shortened season, he appeared in 30 games, finishing with 14 points, and was the top scoring defenseman on the team. The following year, Attard continued his offensive output and was selected for the AHCA First-Team All-American team and nominated for the Hobey Baker Award.

=== Professional ===
Following the completion of his junior season with Western Michigan, Attard concluded his collegiate career in agreeing to immediately join the Philadelphia Flyers for the remainder of the 2021–21 season on a two-year, entry-level contract on March 29, 2022. Four days later, Attard made his NHL debut in the Flyers' 6–3 loss to the Toronto Maple Leafs. He was subbed in for Keith Yandle, whose iron man streak ended after a record 989 games. On April 5, Attard recorded his first NHL point, assisting on a goal by James van Riemsdyk in the Flyers' 4–2 loss to the Columbus Blue Jackets.

As restricted free agent following the conclusion of his entry-level contract, Attard was re-signed to a two-year, two-way $1.7 million contract extension on July 5, 2023.

During his final year under contract in the 2024–25 season, on November 4, 2024, Attard was traded by the Flyers to the Edmonton Oilers in exchange for Ben Gleason. Continuing in the AHL, Attard was assigned to join affiliate, the Bakersfield Condors, for the remainder of the season. In 59 games with Bakersfield, he recorded 7 goals and 17 points, finishing third in offensive categories among team defensemen.

As a free agent from the Oilers, Attard was signed to a one-year, two-way contract with the Colorado Avalanche on July 1, 2025.

On July 13, 2026, Attard signed a one-year, two-way contract with the Detroit Red Wings.

== International play ==
Attard was named captain of Team USA at the 2018 World Junior A Challenge, where he helped lead the team to a gold medal win over Russia.

== Career statistics ==
=== Regular season and playoffs ===
			Regular season					Playoffs
Season	Team	League	GP	G	A	Pts	PIM	GP	G	A	Pts	PIM
2016–17	Tri-City Storm	USHL	46	3	2	5	27	—	—	—	—	—
2017–18	Tri-City Storm	USHL	50	8	7	15	126	2	0	0	0	6
2018–19	Tri-City Storm	USHL	48	30	34	64	66	6	0	1	1	8
2019–20	Western Michigan U.	NCHC	30	6	8	14	29	—	—	—	—	—
2020–21	Western Michigan U.	NCHC	25	8	14	22	8	—	—	—	—	—
2021–22	Western Michigan U.	NCHC	39	13	23	36	24	—	—	—	—	—
2021–22	Philadelphia Flyers	NHL	15	2	2	4	8	—	—	—	—	—
2022–23	Lehigh Valley Phantoms	AHL	68	12	20	32	41	3	0	1	1	4
2022–23	Philadelphia Flyers	NHL	2	0	0	0	0	—	—	—	—	—
2023–24	Lehigh Valley Phantoms	AHL	48	10	17	27	37	6	1	1	2	10
2023–24	Philadelphia Flyers	NHL	12	0	2	2	6	—	—	—	—	—
2024–25	Lehigh Valley Phantoms	AHL	7	0	0	0	19	—	—	—	—	—
2024–25	Bakersfield Condors	AHL	59	7	10	17	61	—	—	—	—	—
2025–26	Colorado Eagles	AHL	44	3	14	17	38	4	2	0	2	2
NHL totals			29	2	4	6	14	—	—	—	—	—

=== International ===
Year	Team	Event	Result	GP	G	A	Pts	PIM
2023	United States	WC	4th	4	1	0	1	2
Senior totals				4	1	0	1	2

== Awards and honors ==
Award	Year	Ref
College
All-NCHC First Team	2020–21, 2021–22	
AHCA West First Team All-American	2020–21, 2021–22	

Awards and achievements
Preceded by Scott Perunovich	NCHC Offensive Defenseman of the Year; 2020–21, 2021–22	Succeeded by Michael Benning
