= NCHC Scholar-Athlete of the Year =

- Sport: Ice hockey

History
- First award: 2014
- Most recent: Kent Anderson

The NCHC Scholar-Athlete of the Year is an annual award given out at the conclusion of the National Collegiate Hockey Conference regular season to a player with at least a 3.5 grade point average and significant on and off ice contributions to their team, campus, and community. Each team selects a player from their own roster to be on the conference Scholar-Athlete Team. The coaches of each NCHC team then vote to determine the Scholar-Athlete of the Year.

The Scholar-Athlete of the Year was first awarded in 2014 and is a successor to the CCHA Scholar-Athlete of the Year which was discontinued after the conference dissolved due to the 2013–14 NCAA conference realignment.

== Award winners ==
Year	Winner	Position	School
2013–14	Nic Dowd	Forward	St. Cloud State
2014–15	Nic Mattson	Defenseman	North Dakota
2015–16	Gabe Levin	Forward	Denver
2016–17	Justin Parizeki	Forward	Omaha
2017–18	Tyler Vesel	Forward	Omaha
2018–19	Mason Bergh	Forward	Colorado College
2019–20	Karch Bachman	Forward	Miami
2020–21	Kyle Bennett	Defenseman	Western Michigan
2021–22	Drew Worrad	Forward	Western Michigan
2022–23	Ethan Frisch	Defenseman	North Dakota
2023–24	Luke Grainger	Forward	Western Michigan
2024–25	Matt Davis	Goaltender	Denver
2025–26	Kent Anderson	Defenseman	Denver

=== Winners by school ===
School	Winners
Denver	3
Western Michigan	3
North Dakota	2
Omaha	2
Colorado College	1
Miami	1
St. Cloud State	1

=== Winners by position ===
Position	Winners
Forward	8
Defenceman	4
Goaltender	1

== See also ==
- NCHC Awards
- CCHA Scholar-Athlete of the Year
