= 2021–22 Michigan Wolverines men's ice hockey season =

Ice Breaker Tournament (West), Champion Big Ten Tournament, Champion NCAA Tournament, National semifinal
- Conference: Big Ten
- Home ice: Yost Ice Arena

Rankings
- USCHO: #3
- USA Today: #3

Record
- Overall: 31–10–1
- Conference: 16–8–0
- Home: 17–5–1
- Road: 10–4–0
- Neutral: 4–1–0

Coaches and captains
- Head coach: Mel Pearson
- Assistant coaches: Bill Muckalt; Brandon Naurato
- Captain: Nick Blankenburg
- Alternate captain(s): Matty Beniers; Jimmy Lambert; Nolan Moyle; Mike Pastujov

The 2021–22 Michigan Wolverines men's hockey team was the Wolverines' 100th season of play. They represented the University of Michigan in the 2021–22 NCAA Division I men's ice hockey season. They were coached by Mel Pearson, in his fifth year, and played their home games at Yost Ice Arena. The Wolverines won the 2022 Big Ten men's ice hockey tournament and received an automatic bid to the 2022 NCAA Tournament, where they reached their NCAA record 26th Frozen Four and were eliminated in the semifinals by eventual national champion Denver.

== Previous season ==
During the 2020–21 season, Michigan went 15–10–1, including 11–9–0 in Big Ten play. They received an at-large bid to the 2021 NCAA Division I men's ice hockey tournament, however, they were removed from the tournament due to positive COVID-19 test results within the program.

== Departures ==
Player	Position	Nationality	Cause
Jack Becker	Forward	Canada	Graduate transfer to Arizona State
Josh Groll	Forward	Canada	Transferred to Minnesota State
Strauss Mann	Goaltender	United States	Signed professional contract (Skellefteå AIK)
Dakota Raabe	Forward	United States	Graduate transfer to Sacred Heart
Cameron York	Defenseman	United States	Signed professional contract (Philadelphia Flyers)

== Recruiting ==
Player	Position	Nationality	Age	Notes
Dylan Duke	Forward	United States	18	Strongsville, OH; selected 126th overall in 2021
Ethan Edwards	Forward	Canada	19	Grande Prairie, AB; selected 120th overall in 2020
Mark Estapa	Forward	United States	19	St. Clair, MI
Luke Hughes	Defenseman	United States	18	Manchester, NH; selected 4th overall in 2021
Mackie Samoskevich	Forward	United States	18	Newtown, CT; selected 24th overall in 2021
Noah West	Goaltender	United States	20	Pittsboro, IN; transfer from Robert Morris

== Roster ==
As of August 30, 2021.

No.	Nat.	Player	Class	Pos	Height	Weight	DoB	Hometown	Previous team	NHL rights
1		Erik Portillo	Sophomore	G	6' 6" (1.98 m)	225 lb (102 kg)	2000-09-03	Gothenburg, Sweden	Dubuque (USHL)	BUF, 67th overall 2019
6		Jack Summers	Senior	D	5' 11" (1.8 m)	180 lb (82 kg)	1999-05-18	Livonia, Michigan	Tri-City (USHL)	—
7		Nick Blankenburg (C)	Senior	F	5' 9" (1.75 m)	160 lb (73 kg)	1998-05-12	Washington, Michigan	Okotoks (AJHL)	—
9		Eric Ciccolini	Junior	F	6' 0" (1.83 m)	170 lb (77 kg)	2001-01-04	Vaughan, Ontario	Toronto Jr. Canadiens (OJHL)	NYR, 205th overall 2019
10		Matty Beniers (A)	Sophomore	F	6' 1" (1.85 m)	175 lb (79 kg)	2002-11-05	Hingham, Massachusetts	USNTDP (USHL)	SEA, 2nd overall 2021
11		Mackie Samoskevich	Freshman	F	5' 11" (1.8 m)	190 lb (86 kg)	2002-11-15	Sandy Hook, Connecticut	Chicago (USHL)	FLA, 24th overall 2021
13		Kent Johnson	Sophomore	F	6' 1" (1.85 m)	165 lb (75 kg)	2002-10-18	Port Moody, British Columbia	Trail (BCHL)	CBJ, 5th overall 2021
15		Jacob Truscott	Sophomore	D	6' 1" (1.85 m)	178 lb (81 kg)	2002-04-12	Port Huron, Michigan	USNTDP (USHL)	VAN, 144th overall 2020
17		Johnny Beecher	Junior	F	6' 3" (1.91 m)	209 lb (95 kg)	2001-04-05	Elmira, New York	USNTDP (USHL)	BOS, 30th overall 2019
19		Brendan Brisson	Sophomore	F	6' 0" (1.83 m)	185 lb (84 kg)	2001-10-22	Manhattan Beach, California	Chicago (USHL)	VGK, 29th overall 2020
20		Keaton Pehrson	Junior	D	6' 2" (1.88 m)	194 lb (88 kg)	1998-12-10	Lakeville, Minnesota	Tri-City (USHL)	—
21		Michael Pastujov (A)	Graduate	F	6' 0" (1.83 m)	190 lb (86 kg)	1999-08-23	Bradenton, Florida	USNTDP (USHL)	—
22		Owen Power	Sophomore	D	6' 6" (1.98 m)	214 lb (97 kg)	2002-11-22	Mississauga, Ontario	Chicago (USHL)	BUF, 1st overall 2021
23		Jimmy Lambert (A)	Senior	F	6' 0" (1.83 m)	175 lb (79 kg)	1997-02-09	Saskatoon, Saskatchewan	Vernon (BCHL)	—
24		Steve Holtz	Sophomore	D	6' 4" (1.93 m)	190 lb (86 kg)	1999-04-02	White Lake, Michigan	Penticton (BCHL)	—
25		Luke Morgan	Graduate	F	5' 11" (1.8 m)	190 lb (86 kg)	1997-08-28	Brighton, Michigan	Lake Superior State (WCHA)	—
26		Philippe Lapointe	Sophomore	F	5' 11" (1.8 m)	185 lb (84 kg)	2000-02-29	Novi, Michigan	Trail (BCHL)	—
27		Nolan Moyle (A)	Senior	F	6' 2" (1.88 m)	185 lb (84 kg)	1999-09-13	Briarcliff Manor, New York	Green Bay (USHL)	—
31		Noah West	Sophomore	G	6' 2" (1.88 m)	185 lb (84 kg)	2000-11-25	Pittsboro, Indiana	Robert Morris (AHA)	—
34		Thomas Bordeleau	Sophomore	F	5' 9" (1.75 m)	179 lb (81 kg)	2002-01-03	Terrebonne, Quebec	USNTDP (USHL)	SJS, 38th overall 2020
37		Jack Leavy	Senior	G	6' 5" (1.96 m)	205 lb (93 kg)	1997-09-19	Birmingham, Michigan	Johnstown (NAHL)	—
43		Luke Hughes	Freshman	D	6' 2" (1.88 m)	186 lb (84 kg)	2003-09-09	Canton, Michigan	USNTDP (USHL)	NJD, 4th overall 2021
51		Garrett Van Wyhe	Senior	F	6' 2" (1.88 m)	200 lb (91 kg)	1997-04-30	Seattle, Washington	Fargo (USHL)	—
55		Jake Gingell	Senior	D	6' 0" (1.83 m)	205 lb (93 kg)	1997-02-11	Dexter, Michigan	Youngstown (USHL)	—
56		Dylan Duke	Freshman	F	5' 10" (1.78 m)	181 lb (82 kg)	2003-03-04	Strongsville, Ohio	USNTDP (USHL)	TBL, 126th overall 2021
71		Nick Granowicz	Junior	F	6' 1" (1.85 m)	174 lb (79 kg)	1998-03-28	Macomb, Michigan	Merritt (BCHL)	—
73		Ethan Edwards	Freshman	D	5' 11" (1.8 m)	185 lb (84 kg)	2002-06-06	St. Albert, Alberta	Sioux City (USHL)	NJD, 120th overall 2020
90		Jay Keranen	Junior	D	5' 11" (1.8 m)	183 lb (83 kg)	1998-05-08	Brighton, Michigan	Prince George (BCHL)	—
94		Mark Estapa	Freshman	F	6' 2" (1.88 m)	197 lb (89 kg)	2002-01-13	St. Clair, Michigan	Tri-City (USHL)	—

== Coaching staff ==
Name	Position coached	Seasons at Michigan
Mel Pearson	Head Coach	5th
Bill Muckalt	Associate Head Coach	5th
Brandon Naurato	Assistant Coach	1st
Bryan Hogan	Volunteer Assistant Coach	1st
Rick Bancroft	Director of Hockey Operations	4th
Joe Maher	Head Strength and Conditioning Coach	9th

== Standings ==
2021–22 Big Ten ice hockey Standings
	Conference record										Overall record					
	GP	W	L	T	OTW	OTL	3/SW	PTS	GF	GA	GP	W	L	T	GF	GA
#5 Minnesota †	24	18	6	0	1	2	0	55	90	50	39	26	13	0	138	91
#2 Michigan *	24	16	8	0	0	3	0	51	91	59	42	31	10	1	167	94
#9 Notre Dame	24	17	7	0	5	1	0	47	74	55	40	28	12	0	122	75
#16 Ohio State	24	13	9	2	1	1	1	42	76	59	37	22	13	2	125	87
Penn State	24	6	17	1	1	1	1	20	63	92	38	17	20	1	117	122
Wisconsin	24	6	17	1	1	2	0	20	53	96	37	10	24	3	76	132
Michigan State	24	6	18	0	1	0	0	17	51	87	36	12	23	1	76	119
Championship: March 19, 2022 † indicates conference regular season champion * indicates conference tournament champion Rankings: USCHO.com Top 20 Poll; updated April 7, 2022

== Schedule and results ==
Date	Time	Opponent^{#}	Rank^{#}	Site	TV	Decision	Result	Attendance	Record
Exhibition
October 2	7:00 PM	Bowling Green*	#3	Yost Ice Arena • Ann Arbor, MI (Exhibition)	BTN+	Portillo	W 7–1	5,407	—
Regular season
October 8	7:30 PM	Lake Superior State*	#3	Yost Ice Arena • Ann Arbor, MI	BTN+	Portillo	W 6–1	5,246	1–0
October 9	7:00 PM	Lake Superior State*	#3	Yost Ice Arena • Ann Arbor, MI	BTN+	Portillo	W 7–4	5,141	2–0
Ice Breaker Tournament
October 15	8:35 PM	at #5 Minnesota Duluth*	#3	AMSOIL Arena • Duluth, MN (Ice Breaker Semifinal)	NCHC.tv	Portillo	W 5–1	5,940	3–0
October 16	4:07 PM	vs. #1 Minnesota State*	#3	AMSOIL Arena • Duluth, MN (Ice Breaker Championship)	NCHC.tv	Portillo	W 3–2	— (Note: Spectators were in attendance, but the exact number was not reported.)	4–0
Regular season
October 22	7:30 PM	#17 Western Michigan*	#1	Yost Ice Arena • Ann Arbor, MI	BTN+	Portillo	L 2–5	5,800	4–1
October 23	7:05 PM	at #17 Western Michigan*	#1	Lawson Arena • Kalamazoo, MI	NCHC.tv	Portillo	W 3–2 ^{OT}	3,369	5–1
October 28	7:00 PM	Wisconsin	#2	Yost Ice Arena • Ann Arbor, MI	BTN	Portillo	W 3–0	5,338	6–1 (1–0)
October 29	7:30 PM	Wisconsin	#2	Yost Ice Arena • Ann Arbor, MI	BTN+	Portillo	L 2–4	5,598	6–2 (1–1)
November 5	7:30 PM	Michigan State	#3	Yost Ice Arena • Ann Arbor, MI (Rivalry)	BTN	Portillo	W 7–2	5,800	7–2 (2–1)
November 6	7:30 PM	at Michigan State	#3	Munn Ice Arena • East Lansing, MI (Rivalry)	BTN+	Portillo	W 3–2	6,705	8–2 (3–1)
November 11	8:30 PM	at #19 Penn State	#2	Pegula Ice Arena • University Park, PA	BTN	Portillo	W 5–1	6,128	9–2 (4–1)
November 12	7:00 PM	at #19 Penn State	#2	Pegula Ice Arena • University Park, PA	BTN+	Portillo	W 6–2	6,437	10–2 (5–1)
November 19	7:30 PM	#14 Notre Dame	#1	Yost Ice Arena • Ann Arbor, MI (Rivalry)	BTN+	Portillo	L 2–3 ^{OT}	5,800	10–3 (5–2)
November 20	8:00 PM	#14 Notre Dame	#1	Yost Ice Arena • Ann Arbor, MI (Rivalry)	BTN+	Portillo	L 4–5 ^{OT}	5,800	10–4 (5–3)
November 26	7:30 PM	Niagara*	#4	Yost Ice Arena • Ann Arbor, MI	BTN+	Portillo	W 6–1	5,800	11–4
November 27	7:00 PM	Niagara*	#4	Yost Ice Arena • Ann Arbor, MI	BTN+	Portillo	W 4–1	5,800	12–4
December 3	6:30 PM	#11 Minnesota	#3	Yost Ice Arena • Ann Arbor, MI (Rivalry)	BTN	Portillo	L 1–5	5,800	12–5 (5–4)
December 4	7:00 PM	#11 Minnesota	#3	Yost Ice Arena • Ann Arbor, MI (Rivalry)	BTN	Portillo	W 6–2	5,613	13–5 (6–4)
December 10	7:00 PM	at #17 Ohio State	#3	Value City Arena • Columbus, OH (Rivalry)	BTN	Portillo	W 5–2	7,324	14–5 (7–4)
December 11	8:00 PM	at #17 Ohio State	#3	Value City Arena • Columbus, OH (Rivalry)	BTN	Portillo	L 1–6	6,928	14–6 (7–5)
Great Lakes Invitational
December 29	7:00 PM	#18 Michigan Tech*	#3	Yost Ice Arena • Ann Arbor, MI (Great Lakes Invitational)	BTN+	Portillo	T 0–0 ^{OT}	5,800	14–6–1
December 30	7:00 PM	#4 Western Michigan*	#3	Yost Ice Arena • Ann Arbor, MI (Great Lakes Invitational)	Cancelled due to the COVID-19 pandemic				
Regular season
January 8	5:00 PM	#10 Massachusetts*	#6	Yost Ice Arena • Ann Arbor, MI	BTN	Portillo	W 4–1	5,800	15–6–1
January 9	4:00 PM	#10 Massachusetts*	#6	Yost Ice Arena • Ann Arbor, MI	ESPNU	Portillo	W 4–2	5,800	16–6–1
January 14	7:30 PM	Penn State	#4	Yost Ice Arena • Ann Arbor, MI	BTN+	Portillo	W 3–2	5,800	17–6–1 (8–5)
January 15	7:00 PM	Penn State	#4	Yost Ice Arena • Ann Arbor, MI	BTN+	Portillo	W 4–3	5,800	18–6–1 (9–5)
January 21	9:00 PM	at #11 Minnesota	#3	3M Arena at Mariucci • Minneapolis, MN, (Rivalry)	ESPNU	Portillo	L 1–2 ^{OT}	8,204	18–7–1 (9–6)
January 22	7:30 PM	at #11 Minnesota	#3	3M Arena at Mariucci • Minneapolis, MN (Rivalry)	BTN	Portillo	W 4–1	8,046	19–7–1 (10–6)
January 28	7:00 PM	at Wisconsin	#4	Kohl Center • Madison, WI	BTN+	Portillo	W 5–1	9,994	20–7–1 (11–6)
January 29	9:00 PM	at Wisconsin	#4	Kohl Center • Madison, WI	BTN	Portillo	W 6–2	12,231	21–7–1 (12–6)
February 2	7:00 PM	USNTDP*	#3	Yost Ice Arena • Ann Arbor, MI (Exhibition)	BTN+	Portillo	W 4–3 ^{OT}	5,176	—
February 11	7:30 PM	Michigan State	#4	Yost Ice Arena • Ann Arbor, MI (Rivalry)	BTN+	Portillo	W 6–2	5,800	22–7–1 (13–6)
February 12	7:00 PM	Michigan State	#4	Little Caesars Arena • Detroit, MI (Duel in the D)	BSD	Portillo	W 7–3	16,289	23–7–1 (14–6)
February 18	7:30 PM	#11 Ohio State	#2	Yost Ice Arena • Ann Arbor, MI (Rivalry)	BTN+	Portillo	W 5–3	5,800	24–7–1 (15–6)
February 19	8:30 PM	#11 Ohio State	#2	Yost Ice Arena • Ann Arbor, MI (Rivalry)	BTN	Portillo	W 3–0	5,800	25–7–1 (16–6)
February 25	7:30 PM	at #9 Notre Dame	#2	Compton Family Ice Arena • Notre Dame, IN (Rivalry)	Peacock	Portillo	L 1–4	5,633	25–8–1 (16–7)
February 26	6:00 PM	at #9 Notre Dame	#2	Compton Family Ice Arena • Notre Dame, IN (Rivalry)	Peacock	Portillo	L 1–2	4,903	25–9–1 (16–8)
Big Ten Tournament
March 4	7:00 PM	Michigan State	#5	Yost Ice Arena • Ann Arbor, MI (Quarterfinals)	FS2	Portillo	W 4–1	3,741	26–9–1
March 5	7:00 PM	Michigan State	#5	Yost Ice Arena • Ann Arbor, MI (Quarterfinals)	BSD	Portillo	W 8–0	5,429	27–9–1
March 12	6:30 PM	#8 Notre Dame	#4	Yost Ice Arena • Ann Arbor, MI (Semifinals)	BTN	Portillo	W 2–1	5,800	28–9–1
March 19	8:00 PM	at #2 Minnesota	#4	3M Arena at Mariucci • Minneapolis, MN (Championship)	BTN	Portillo	W 4–3	10,774	29–9–1
NCAA Tournament
March 25	3:00 PM	vs. #18 American International	#2	PPL Center • Allentown, PA (Regional semifinals)	ESPNU	Portillo	W 5–3	2,155	30–9–1
March 27	6:30 PM	vs. #8 Quinnipiac	#2	PPL Center • Allentown, PA (Regional final)	ESPN2	Portillo	W 7–4	3,256	31–9–1
April 7	5:00 PM	vs. #3 Denver	#2	TD Garden • Boston, MA (National semifinals)	ESPN2	Portillo	L 2–3 ^{OT}	17,850	31–10–1
*Non-conference game. ^{#}Rankings from USCHO.com Poll. All times are in Eastern Time. Source:

== Rankings ==
Poll	Week																									
Poll	Pre	1	2	3	4	5	6	7	8	9	10	11	12	13	14	15	16	17	18	19	20	21	22	23	24	25 (Final)
USCHO.com	3 (11)	3 (8)	3 (16)	1 (45)	2 (17)	3	2 (3)	1 (42)	4 (1)	3 (5)	3	3	6	4 (3)	3 (4)	4 (3)	3 (6)	4 (4)	2 (8)	2 (10)	5	4 (1)	4 (1)	2 (14)	2 (14)^	3
USA Today	2 (4)	3 (6)	3 (9)	1 (34)	3 (6)	4	2	1 (24)	3 (3)	2 (3)	3 (1)	3	7	5	4 (4)	4	4 (1)	4 (1)	2 (5)	2 (4)	4	4	4	2 (13)	2 (7)	3

^USCHO.com did not release a Week 24 poll.

== Awards and honors ==
Weekly Awards
Player	Award	Date Awarded	Ref.
Brendan Brisson	Big Ten First Star of the Week	October 12, 2021	
Owen Power	Big Ten Second Star of the Week	October 12, 2021	
Brendan Brisson	Big Ten First Star of the Week	October 19, 2021	
Matty Beniers	Big Ten First Star of the Week	November 9, 2021	
Matty Beniers	Big Ten First Star of the Week	November 16, 2021	
Owen Power	Big Ten Second Star of the Week	November 16, 2021	
Nick Blankenburg	Big Ten First Star of the Week	December 1, 2021	
Michael Pastujov	Big Ten First Star of the Week	December 8, 2021	
Nick Blankenburg	Big Ten Third Star of the Week	December 14, 2021	
Brendan Brisson	Big Ten Second Star of the Week	January 11, 2022	
Erik Portillo	Big Ten Third Star of the Week	January 11, 2022	
Matty Beniers	Big Ten First Star of the Week	January 18, 2022	
Matty Beniers	Big Ten Second Star of the Week	February 1, 2022	
Luke Hughes	Big Ten First Star of the Week	February 15, 2022	
Luke Hughes	Big Ten First Star of the Week	February 22, 2022	

Player	Award	Ref
Matty Beniers	AHCA West First Team All-American	
Luke Hughes	AHCA West Second Team All-American	
Owen Power	AHCA West Second Team All-American	
Luke Hughes	Big Ten Freshman of the Year	
Matty Beniers	Big Ten Scoring Champion	
Erik Portillo	Big Ten Tournament Most Outstanding Player	
Owen Power	All-Big Ten First Team	
Matty Beniers	All-Big Ten First Team	
Erik Portillo	All-Big Ten Second Team	
Luke Hughes	All-Big Ten Second Team	
Brendan Brisson	All-Big Ten Second Team	
Luke Hughes	All-Big Ten Freshman Team	
Mackie Samoskevich	All-Big Ten Freshman Team	
Erik Portillo	Big Ten All-Tournament Team	
Luke Hughes	Big Ten All-Tournament Team	
Mackie Samoskevich	Big Ten All-Tournament Team	
Brendan Brisson	Big Ten All-Tournament Team	
Matty Beniers	Big Ten All-Tournament Team	

== Players drafted into the NHL ==
Michigan had four players selected in the 2020 NHL entry draft. Brendan Brisson was drafted in the first-round, becoming the 25th first-round NHL Draft selection for Michigan, which leads all NCAA teams. Michigan had five players drafted in the 2021 NHL entry draft. Owen Power became the first Wolverine to be drafted first overall. Michigan's 2021–22 roster had an NCAA record seven first round draft picks.

Year	Round	Pick	Player	NHL team
2021	1	1	Owen Power	Buffalo Sabres
2021	1	2	Matty Beniers	Seattle Kraken
2021	1	4	Luke Hughes	New Jersey Devils
2021	1	5	Kent Johnson	Columbus Blue Jackets
2021	1	24	Mackie Samoskevich	Florida Panthers
2020	1	29	Brendan Brisson	Vegas Golden Knights
2020	2	38	Thomas Bordeleau	San Jose Sharks
2020	4	120	Ethan Edwards	New Jersey Devils
2020	5	144	Jacob Truscott	Vancouver Canucks
