= 2021–22 Notre Dame Fighting Irish men's ice hockey season =

NCAA tournament, East Regional final
- Conference: 3rd Big Ten
- Home ice: Compton Family Ice Arena

Rankings
- USCHO: #8
- USA Today: #8

Record
- Overall: 28–12–0
- Conference: 15–7–0
- Home: 17–6–0
- Road: 10–5–0
- Neutral: 1–1–0

Coaches and captains
- Head coach: Jeff Jackson
- Assistant coaches: Paul Pooley; Andy Slaggert; Jordy Murray
- Captain(s): Adam Karashik; Jake Pivonka; Graham Slaggert
- Alternate captain(s): Nick Leivermann; Spencer Stastney

The 2021–22 Notre Dame Fighting Irish men's ice hockey season was the 62nd season of play for the program. They represented the University of Notre Dame in the 2021–22 NCAA Division I men's ice hockey season. This season marked the fifth season in the Big Ten Conference. They were coached by Jeff Jackson, in his 17th season, and played their home games at Compton Family Ice Arena.

== Season ==
After a horribly disappointing situation that saw them have to withdraw from the 2021 NCAA tournament, Notre Dame entered the season with high expectations. They began the year alternating between junior Ryan Bischel and graduate transfer Matthew Galajda in goal with both performing wonderfully in goal. During the season both goaltenders were among the top 10 in the nation for goals against average and kept the Fighting Irish in contention for just about every game.

During the first half of the year ND stayed in the second 10 of the polls until a showdown with Michigan just before Thanksgiving. The Irish managed to beat the top-ranked Wolverines twice on the road, firmly establishing themselves as a tournament hopeful. While they earned splits over each of the succeeding weekends to weaker teams, the losses didn't hurt their postseason chances too much.

On the offensive side, Notre Dame didn't have much in the way of a star scorer but the team worked well overall. The Fighting Irish averages over three goals a game and typically scored when they needed to, generating offense from all four lines. The balanced play enabled Notre Dame to put together an even better second half and, as the season progressed, the Irish slowly moved up into the top 10. In the final week of the regular season, they played Michigan once more, this time at home, and Notre Dame again swept the vaunted Wolverines, all but guaranteeing them a spot in the NCAA tournament.

In the Big Ten tournament, the Irish got a slight scare from Wisconsin when they lost the first game. Despite firing 50 shots on goal, the offense continued to attack in the next two games and the Badgers' defense couldn't repeat the same performance. When Notre Dame won the series they moved up to 6 in the PairWise rankings and were mathematically guaranteed a spot in the tournament. Despite that, the team was champing at the bit to defeat Michigan for a 5th time that season as the two met in the conference semifinals. Unfortunately for the Irish, their offense would not get on track and they could only manage 20 shots in the game, losing 1–2.

=== NCAA tournament ===
Despite the setback, Notre Dame looked ready to go once the NCAA tournament began. They took on North Dakota in what was expected to be a very even match (the two were ranked 9th and 7th respectively). Both teams played a very defensive style which kept both the shot total and scoring chances low. The Fighting Hawks got on the board at the end of the first but the Irish responded with their own just over a minute after the second began. Both defenses held strong for the balance of the game but a breakdown on a North Dakota power play as time was expiring gave Notre Dame a chance. The puck was fired into the top of the net right before the final buzzer and the Irish began to celebrate but, upon review, there was a problem with the clock. One of the game clocks still had time remaining but the official clock had already expired. After a lengthy review, the goal was ruled to have entered after time expired and the two teams required overtime. With North Dakota still on the power play, the Hawks made a mistake at the Irish blueline and took a penalty in order to stop a Notre Dame breakaway. Once the ND penalty expired, the Fighting Irish got to work and engineered an overtime winner from Graham Slaggert to send them to the quarterfinals.

In the Regional finals, Notre Dame faced off against #1 ranked Minnesota State but the Irish were undaunted. Notre Dame played the same hard defensive game that had worked for them all season but their offense, which was lacking high-end firepower, could not solve the equally strong resistance from the Mavericks. While Notre Dame was outshot, they had several opportunities to score but they could get nothing past Dryden McKay and the single goal that Galajda allowed was enough to end their season.

== Departures ==
Player	Position	Nationality	Cause
Ryan Carmichael	Forward/Defenseman	United States	Transferred to Yale
Nathan Clurman	Defenseman	United States	Signed professional contract (Colorado Avalanche)
Pierce Crawford	Forward	United States	Graduate transfer to Mercyhurst
Christian DiCesare	Defenseman	United States	Transferred to Trinity
Michael Graham	Forward	United States	Left program (retired)
Matt Hellickson	Defenseman	United States	Graduation (signed with Binghamton Devils)
Nick Sanford	Goaltender	United States	Graduation (retired)
Dylan St. Cyr	Goaltender	United States	Graduate transfer to Quinnipiac
Alex Steeves	Forward	United States	Signed professional contract (Toronto Maple Leafs)
Matt Steeves	Forward	United States	Graduation (retired)
Colin Theisen	Forward	United States	Graduate transfer to Arizona State

== Recruiting ==
Player	Position	Nationality	Age	Notes
John Adams	Forward	United States	24	Boxford, MA; graduate transfer from Providence; selected 162nd overall in 2016
Chase Blackmun	Defenseman	United States	22	Hudson, WI; transfer from Massachusetts Lowell
Tyler Carpenter	Forward	United States	21	Palatine, IL
Matthew Galajda	Goaltender	Canada	23	Aurora, ON; graduate transfer from Cornell
Josh Graziano	Goaltender	United States	21	Buffalo, NY; transfer from Union
Ryan Helliwell	Defenseman	Canada	19	Burnaby, BC
Justin Janicke	Forward	United States	18	Maple Grove, MN; selected 195th overall in 2021
Adam Karashik	Defenseman	United States	23	Ridgefield, CT; graduate transfer from Connecticut
Hunter Strand	Forward	United States	18	Anchorage, AK
Hunter Weiss	Defenseman	United States	20	Lake Forest, IL

== Roster ==
As of September 17, 2021.

No.	Nat.	Player	Class	Pos	Height	Weight	DoB	Hometown	Previous team	NHL rights
3	(United States)	Adam Karashik (C)	Graduate	D	6' 0" (1.83 m)	205 lb (93 kg)	1998-01-15	Ridgefield, Connecticut	Connecticut (HEA)	—
4	(United States)	Nick Leivermann (A)	Senior	D	5' 11" (1.8 m)	184 lb (83 kg)	1998-09-14	Eden Prairie, Minnesota	Penticton Vees (BCHL)	COL, 187th overall 2017
5	(United States)	Chase Blackmun	Graduate	D	6' 0" (1.83 m)	195 lb (88 kg)	1999-04-02	Hudson, Wisconsin	Massachusetts Lowell (HEA)	—
6	(United States)	Jake Boltmann	Sophomore	D	6' 1" (1.85 m)	192 lb (87 kg)	2001-10-19	Edina, Minnesota	Lincoln Stars (USHL)	CGY, 80th overall 2020
8	(United States)	Justin Janicke	Freshman	F	6' 0" (1.83 m)	184 lb (83 kg)	2003-06-30	Maple Grove, Minnesota	USNTDP (USHL)	SEA, 195th overall 2021
9	(United States)	Grant Silianoff	Sophomore	F	5' 11" (1.8 m)	170 lb (77 kg)	2001-01-04	Edina, Minnesota	Cedar Rapids RoughRiders (USHL)	—
10	(United States)	Cam Burke	Senior	F	5' 9" (1.75 m)	170 lb (77 kg)	1999-01-08	Boxborough, Massachusetts	Sioux Falls Stampede (USHL)	—
11	(United States)	Hunter Strand	Freshman	F	5' 11" (1.8 m)	187 lb (85 kg)	2002-11-13	Anchorage, Alaska	Tri-City Storm (USHL)	—
12	(United States)	Ryder Rolston	Sophomore	F	6' 2" (1.88 m)	185 lb (84 kg)	2001-10-31	Birmingham, Michigan	Waterloo Black Hawks (USHL)	CHI, 139th overall 2020
14	(Canada)	Jesse Lansdell	Junior	F	5' 11" (1.8 m)	185 lb (84 kg)	1998-08-05	Surrey, British Columbia	Vernon Vipers (BCHL)	—
17	(Canada)	Ryan Helliwell	Freshman	D	6' 0" (1.83 m)	192 lb (87 kg)	2002-08-05	Burnaby, British Columbia	Trail Smoke Eaters (BCHL)	—
18	(United States)	Graham Slaggert (C)	Senior	F	6' 0" (1.83 m)	191 lb (87 kg)	1999-04-06	South Bend, Indiana	Cedar Rapids RoughRiders (USHL)	—
19	(United States)	Landon Slaggert	Sophomore	F	6' 0" (1.83 m)	190 lb (86 kg)	2002-06-25	South Bend, Indiana	USNTDP (USHL)	CHI, 79th overall 2020
20	(United States)	Jake Pivonka (C)	Senior	F	6' 0" (1.83 m)	200 lb (91 kg)	2000-02-28	Naperville, Illinois	USNTDP (USHL)	NYI, 103rd overall 2018
21	(United States)	Max Ellis	Junior	F	5' 9" (1.75 m)	165 lb (75 kg)	2000-01-18	Plymouth, Michigan	Muskegon Lumberjacks (USHL)	—
22	(United States)	Jack Adams	Graduate	F	6' 6" (1.98 m)	218 lb (99 kg)	1997-02-05	Boxborough, Massachusetts	Providence (HEA)	DET, 162nd overall 2017
23	(United States)	Brady Bjork	Sophomore	F	6' 1" (1.85 m)	177 lb (80 kg)	1999-05-17	Mequon, Wisconsin	St. Cloud Norsemen (NAHL)	—
24	(United States)	Spencer Stastney (A)	Senior	D	5' 11" (1.8 m)	192 lb (87 kg)	2000-01-04	Mequon, Wisconsin	USNTDP (USHL)	NSH, 131st overall 2018
25	(United States)	Solag Bakich	Junior	F	6' 0" (1.83 m)	190 lb (86 kg)	1998-01-08	Dallas, Texas	Waterloo Black Hawks (USHL)	—
26	(United States)	Zach Plucinski	Sophomore	D	6' 1" (1.85 m)	200 lb (91 kg)	2000-07-26	Eagle River, Alaska	Omaha Lancers (USHL)	—
27	(United States)	Trevor Janicke	Junior	F	5' 10" (1.78 m)	195 lb (88 kg)	2000-12-25	Maple Grove, Minnesota	Central Illinois Flying Aces (USHL)	ANA, 132nd overall 2019
28	(United States)	Tyler Carpenter	Freshman	F	5' 11" (1.8 m)	185 lb (84 kg)	2000-08-27	Palatine, Illinois	Omaha Lancers (USHL)	—
29	(United States)	Charlie Raith	Senior	D	5' 9" (1.75 m)	167 lb (76 kg)	1997-04-30	Winnetka, Illinois	Central Illinois Flying Aces (USHL)	—
30	(United States)	Ryan Bischel	Junior	G	6' 1" (1.85 m)	187 lb (85 kg)	1999-07-05	Medina, Minnesota	Fargo Force (USHL)	—
32	(United States)	Hunter Weiss	Freshman	D	6' 3" (1.91 m)	213 lb (97 kg)	2001-03-29	Lake Forest, Illinois	Minnesota Magicians (NAHL)	—
33	(United States)	Josh Graziano	Sophomore	G	6' 3" (1.91 m)	202 lb (92 kg)	2000-03-22	Buffalo, New York	Johnstown Tomahawks (NAHL)	—
35	(Canada)	Matthew Galajda	Graduate	G	6' 0" (1.83 m)	198 lb (90 kg)	1997-10-07	Aurora, Ontario	Cornell (ECAC)	—

== Standings ==
2021–22 Big Ten ice hockey Standings
	Conference record										Overall record					
	GP	W	L	T	OTW	OTL	3/SW	PTS	GF	GA	GP	W	L	T	GF	GA
#5 Minnesota †	24	18	6	0	1	2	0	55	90	50	39	26	13	0	138	91
#2 Michigan *	24	16	8	0	0	3	0	51	91	59	42	31	10	1	167	94
#9 Notre Dame	24	17	7	0	5	1	0	47	74	55	40	28	12	0	122	75
#16 Ohio State	24	13	9	2	1	1	1	42	76	59	37	22	13	2	125	87
Penn State	24	6	17	1	1	1	1	20	63	92	38	17	20	1	117	122
Wisconsin	24	6	17	1	1	2	0	20	53	96	37	10	24	3	76	132
Michigan State	24	6	18	0	1	0	0	17	51	87	36	12	23	1	76	119
Championship: March 19, 2022 † indicates conference regular season champion * indicates conference tournament champion Rankings: USCHO.com Top 20 Poll; updated April 7, 2022

== Schedule and results ==
Date	Time	Opponent^{#}	Rank^{#}	Site	TV	Decision	Result	Attendance	Record
Exhibition
October 3	5:00 PM	USNTDP*		Compton Family Ice Arena • Notre Dame, IN (Exhibition)			L 3–4		—
Regular season
October 9	6:00 PM	LIU*	#19	Compton Family Ice Arena • Notre Dame, IN	NBCRN	Galajda	W 5–2	3,156	1–0–0
October 15	7:07 PM	at #16 Michigan Tech*	#17	MacInnes Student Ice Arena • Houghton, MI		Bischel	W 2–1 ^{OT}	3,899	2–0–0
October 16	6:37 PM	at Northern Michigan*	#17	Berry Events Center • Marquette, MI		Galajda	W 5–2	3,754	3–0–0
October 21	7:05 PM	RIT*	#13	Compton Family Ice Arena • Notre Dame, IN	NBCRN, SNY	Bischel	L 2–3 ^{OT}	2,283	3–1–0
October 22	7:05 PM	RIT*	#13	Compton Family Ice Arena • Notre Dame, IN	NBCRN, SNY	Galajda	W 6–0	3,779	4–1–0
October 29	9:00 PM	at #7 Minnesota	#14	3M Arena at Mariucci • Minneapolis, MN	BTN	Galajda	L 1–4	6,744	4–2–0 (0–1–0)
October 30	6:00 PM	at #7 Minnesota	#14	3M Arena at Mariucci • Minneapolis, MN	BSN	Bischel	L 2–3	6,875	4–3–0 (0–2–0)
November 4	7:30 PM	Holy Cross*	#17	Compton Family Ice Arena • Notre Dame, IN	NBCSN	Galajda	W 5–2	2,480	5–3–0
November 5	7:30 PM	Holy Cross*	#17	Compton Family Ice Arena • Notre Dame, IN	NBCRN	Galajda	W 4–1	4,521	6–3–0
November 12	7:30 PM	Wisconsin	#15	Compton Family Ice Arena • Notre Dame, IN	NBCSN	Galajda	W 5–1	4,335	7–3–0 (1–2–0)
November 13	6:00 PM	Wisconsin	#15	Compton Family Ice Arena • Notre Dame, IN	NBCRN	Galajda	W 3–0	3,977	8–3–0 (2–2–0)
November 19	7:30 PM	at #1 Michigan	#14	Yost Ice Arena • Ann Arbor, MI (Rivalry)		Bischel	W 3–2 ^{OT}	5,800	9–3–0 (3–2–0)
November 20	8:00 PM	at #1 Michigan	#14	Yost Ice Arena • Ann Arbor, MI (Rivalry)		Bischel	W 5–4 ^{OT}	5,800	10–3–0 (4–2–0)
December 3	7:30 PM	#18 Ohio State	#8	Compton Family Ice Arena • Notre Dame, IN	NBCSN	Galajda	L 2–4	4,343	10–4–0 (4–3–0)
December 4	6:00 PM	#18 Ohio State	#8	Compton Family Ice Arena • Notre Dame, IN	NBCRN	Bischel	W 5–1	5,117	11–4–0 (5–3–0)
December 10	7:30 PM	Michigan State	#8	Compton Family Ice Arena • Notre Dame, IN	NBCSN	Galajda	W 3–2	4,046	12–4–0 (6–3–0)
December 11	7:00 PM	Michigan State	#8	Compton Family Ice Arena • Notre Dame, IN	NBCSN	Bischel	L 0–1 ^{OT}	4,445	12–5–0 (6–4–0)
December 31	6:00 PM	Niagara*	#10	Compton Family Ice Arena • Notre Dame, IN	Peacock	Galajda	L 1–3	3,374	12–6–0
January 1	5:00 PM	Niagara*	#10	Compton Family Ice Arena • Notre Dame, IN	Peacock	Bischel	W 5–0	2,791	13–6–0
January 7	7:00 PM	at Penn State	#13	Pegula Ice Arena • University Park, PA		Bischel	W 4–2	5,639	14–6–0 (7–4–0)
January 8	5:00 PM	at Penn State	#13	Pegula Ice Arena • University Park, PA		Galajda	W 5–4 ^{OT}	5,871	15–6–0 (8–4–0)
January 14	7:00 PM	at #16 Ohio State	#13	Value City Arena • Columbus, OH		Bischel	W 3–2 ^{OT}	8,350	16–6–0 (9–4–0)
January 15	8:00 PM	at #16 Ohio State	#13	Value City Arena • Columbus, OH	BTN	Bischel	L 1–4	6,114	16–7–0 (9–5–0)
January 19	7:00 PM	Boston College*	#13	Compton Family Ice Arena • Notre Dame, IN (Holy War on Ice)	NBCRN	Galajda	W 8–2	4,124	17–7–0
January 28	7:30 PM	#10 Minnesota	#11	Compton Family Ice Arena • Notre Dame, IN	Peacock	Galajda	L 1–5	4,711	17–8–0 (9–6–0)
January 29	6:00 PM	#10 Minnesota	#11	Compton Family Ice Arena • Notre Dame, IN	Peacock	Bischel	W 3–2 ^{OT}	4,632	18–8–0 (10–6–0)
February 4	7:30 PM	Penn State	#13	Compton Family Ice Arena • Notre Dame, IN	Peacock	Bischel	W 7–2	4,358	19–8–0 (11–6–0)
February 5	6:00 PM	Penn State	#13	Compton Family Ice Arena • Notre Dame, IN	Peacock	Bischel	W 3–0	4,678	20–8–0 (12–6–0)
February 12	8:30 PM	at Wisconsin	#11	Kohl Center • Madison, WI	BTN	Galajda	L 3–5	9,228	20–9–0 (12–7–0)
February 13	8:00 PM	at Wisconsin	#11	Kohl Center • Madison, WI	BSW	Galajda	W 3–2	10,934	21–9–0 (13–7–0)
February 18	7:00 PM	at Michigan State	#12	Munn Ice Arena • East Lansing, MI		Galajda	W 2–1	5,635	22–9–0 (14–7–0)
February 19	7:00 PM	at Michigan State	#12	Munn Ice Arena • East Lansing, MI		Galajda	W 4–2	6,068	23–9–0 (15–7–0)
February 25	7:30 PM	#2 Michigan	#9	Compton Family Ice Arena • Notre Dame, IN (Rivalry)	Peacock	Galajda	W 4–1	4,850	24–9–0 (16–7–0)
February 26	6:00 PM	#2 Michigan	#9	Compton Family Ice Arena • Notre Dame, IN (Rivalry)	Peacock	Galajda	W 2–1	4,903	25–9–0 (17–7–0)
Big Ten tournament
March 4	7:00 PM	Wisconsin*	#7	Compton Family Ice Arena • Notre Dame, Indiana (Quarterfinal game 1)		Galajda	L 1–3	3,634	25–10–0
March 5	6:00 PM	Wisconsin*	#7	Compton Family Ice Arena • Notre Dame, Indiana (Quarterfinal game 2)		Galajda	W 3–2	3,738	26–10–0
March 6	6:00 PM	Wisconsin*	#7	Compton Family Ice Arena • Notre Dame, Indiana (Quarterfinal game 3)		Galajda	W 4–2	2,612	27–10–0
March 12	6:30 PM	at #4 Michigan*	#8	Yost Ice Arena • Ann Arbor, Michigan (Semifinal)	BTN	Galajda	L 1–2	5,800	27–11–0
NCAA tournament
March 24	6:00 PM	vs. #7 North Dakota*	#9	MVP Arena • Albany, New York (East Regional semifinal)	ESPNU	Galajda	W 2–1 ^{OT}	2,345	28–11–0
March 26	6:30 PM	vs. #1 Minnesota State*	#9	MVP Arena • Albany, New York (East Regional final)	ESPNU	Galajda	L 0–1	3,449	28–12–0
*Non-conference game. ^{#}Rankings from USCHO.com Poll. All times are in Eastern Time. Source:

== Scoring statistics ==
Name	Position	Games	Goals	Assists	Points	PIM
Max Ellis	RW	39	16	12	28	14
Ryder Rolston	C/W	38	10	17	27	24
Spencer Stastney	D	39	7	20	27	8
Nick Leivermann	D	34	6	21	27	8
Landon Slaggert	C/LW	40	12	14	26	39
Graham Slaggert	C	39	12	13	25	27
Trevor Janicke	C/RW	40	15	9	24	14
Jesse Lansdell	F	36	8	11	19	33
Cam Burke	C	38	8	11	19	4
Grant Silianoff	RW	32	5	13	18	8
Solag Bakich	F	38	5	12	17	32
John Adams	C/RW	38	6	10	16	8
Chase Blackmun	D	40	2	14	16	22
Adam Karashik	D	40	1	15	16	26
Hunter Strand	C	40	8	7	15	8
Jake Boltmann	D	40	1	12	13	28
Justin Janicke	F	33	2	8	10	31
Jacob Pivonka	C	25	1	7	8	4
Zachary Plucinski	D	32	2	2	4	18
Tyler Carpenter	F	6	1	0	1	0
Charlie Raith	G	14	0	1	1	0
Ryan Bischel	G	16	0	1	1	2
Ryan Helliwell	D	36	0	1	1	24
Conor Klaers	G	1	0	0	0	0
Brady Bjork	C	6	0	0	0	0
Matthew Galajda	G	26	0	0	0	0
Bench	-	-	-	-	-	18
Total			128	231	359	400

== Goaltending statistics ==
Name	Games	Minutes	Wins	Losses	Ties	Goals against	Saves	Shut outs	SV %	GAA
Matthew Galajda	26	1481	18	8	0	47	656	2	.933	1.90
Ryan Bischel	16	922	10	4	0	32	387	2	.924	2.08
Empty Net	-	17	-	-	-	3	-	-	-	-
Total	40	2420	28	12	0	82	1043	4	.927	2.03

== Rankings ==
Poll	Week																									
Poll	Pre	1	2	3	4	5	6	7	8	9	10	11	12	13	14	15	16	17	18	19	20	21	22	23	24	25 (Final)
USCHO.com	18	19	17	13	14	17	15	14	8	8	8	10	13	13	13	11	13	11	12	9	7	8	9	9	-	8
USA Today	NR	NR	NR	12	NR	NR	15	15	8	8	8	10	13	13	14	13	13	11	11	8	7	8	9	10	8	8

Note: USCHO did not release a poll in week 24.

== Awards and honors ==
Player	Award	Ref
Max Ellis	Big Ten Second Team	

== Players drafted into the NHL ==
=== 2022 NHL entry draft ===
Round	Pick	Player	NHL team
7	212	Brennan Ali^{†}	Detroit Red Wings

† incoming freshman
