= 2021–22 Ohio State Buckeyes men's ice hockey season =

- Conference: 3rd Big Ten
- Home ice: Value City Arena

Rankings
- USCHO: #16
- USA Today: NR

Record
- Overall: 22–13–2
- Conference: 13–9–2
- Home: 14–8–0
- Road: 8–5–2

Coaches and captains
- Head coach: Steve Rohlik
- Assistant coaches: Steve Miller; J. B. Bittner; Dustin Carlson
- Captain(s): Will Riedell; Gustaf Westlund
- Alternate captain(s): Jaedon Leslie; Quinn Preston

The 2021–22 Ohio State Buckeyes men's ice hockey season was the 59th season of play for the program. They represented the Ohio State University in the 2021–22 NCAA Division I men's ice hockey season. This season marked the ninth season in the Big Ten Conference. They were coached by Steve Rohlik, in his ninth season, and played their home games at Value City Arena.

== Season ==
Entering the season, Ohio State was picked to finish last in the Big Ten. The Buckeyes, however, began the season well, winning three of their first four games. While the victories helped, the first few weeks also settled the goaltending competition when freshman Jakub Dobeš established himself as the starter over Ryan Snowden. Ohio State was able to use stellar performances from the Czech goalie to dramatically exceed expectations for the year.

After beginning their conference schedule, OSU swept Penn State and then earned splits with Michigan, Minnesota and Notre Dame, all ranked teams. While their record wasn't particularly outstanding by the end of December, Ohio State had played well enough to rise up to 17th in the ranking, putting them in a prime position to make the NCAA Tournament. In the first half of the year, Ohio State's offense was clicking along at more than three goals per game and was performing very consistently, being held under 3 goals on just five occasions.

The Buckeyes played even better after the Winter Break, losing just once in twelve games. While their opponents weren't particularly strong, OSU was able to get up to 8th in the polls and, more importantly, they were in the top 10 of the PairWise rankings. All the Buckeyes needed to guarantee themselves a spot in the tournament was a win or two in the final few weeks of the season but, just as they were ready to make postseason plans, the wheels came off.

Ohio State's final two opponents were top two teams in the conference, Minnesota and Michigan. Both were playing at a very high level while the Buckeyes were seemingly coasting into the conference tournament. The OSU offense, a strength all season, failed. The team scored just 6 goals in 4 games. Worse, Dobeš didn't play particularly well as the team allowed 8 goals against in both weekends and were swept by both teams. The four consecutive losses could not have come at a worse time, dropping Ohio State down the rankings, but the team's postseason hopes were still alive due to the strength of their conquerors.

Ohio State sat 13th in the PairWise as they began the Big Ten Tournament. While the top 10 were automatically qualified for the NCAA tournament, the next 6 could receive bids based on postseason results. As long as Ohio State got out of the conference quarterfinals, they would likely receive an at-large bid. Their opponent, Penn State, had had a dreadful conference season; despite being just one place behind the Buckeyes, PSU was 22 points lower in the standings. The first game went to script for OSU as the offense seemed to get back on track but it was the defense that looked to be a problem. While they won 4–3, Ohio State allowed 52 shots against and that trend continued over the next two games. Penn State carried the bulk of the play, outshooting the Buckeyes by at least 10 in each of the three games. While Ohio State was able to score in the first match, they faltered in games 2 and 3, allowing the Nittany Lions to win both and potting themselves on the postseason bubble.

After losing the series, Ohio State was dropped down to 15 in the PairWise. Because none of the Atlantic Hockey teams were in the top 16, that was the lowest possible position that could make the tournament. Ohio State could only wait and hope that there were no upsets for any of the five other conference championships. The next week the team got a slight boost when both the Big Ten and NCHC all advanced teams that were guaranteed bids to their respective championships but they had to hold their breath as spoilers from the CCHA, ECAC and Hockey East continued. On the final day of conference play, Ohio State needed each of those three championship games to go a specific way but they could only get two. When Harvard won the ECAC championship, Ohio State was knocked out and their season was over.

== Departures ==
Player	Position	Nationality	Cause
Layton Ahac	Defenseman	Canada	Signed professional contract (Vegas Golden Knights)
Ryan Dickinson	Defenseman	United States	Transferred to Oswego State
Eugene Fadyeyev	Forward	Ukraine	Graduation (signed with Fayetteville Marksmen)
Matthew Jennings	Forward	United States	Transferred to St. Thomas
Evan Moyse	Goaltender	United States	Graduation (signed with Birmingham Bulls)
Tommy Nappier	Goaltender	United States	Graduation (signed with Wilkes-Barre/Scranton Penguins)
Collin Peters	Forward	United States	Graduation (retired)
Austin Pooley	Forward	Canada	Graduation (retired)

== Recruiting ==
Player	Position	Nationality	Age	Notes
Eric Cooley	Forward	United States	23	Pittsburgh, PA; graduate transfer from Niagara
Jakub Dobeš	Goaltender	Czech Republic	20	Havířov, CZE; selected 136th overall in 2020
Reilly Herbst	Goaltender	United States	21	Niwot, CO
Mason Lohrei	Defenseman	United States	20	Baton Rouge, LA; selected 58th overall in 2020
Cole McWard	Defenseman	United States	20	Fenton, MO
Georgii Merkulov	Forward	Russia	20	Ryazan, RUS
Will Riedell	Defenseman	United States	24	Greensboro, NC; graduate transfer from Lake Superior State
Camden Thiesing	Forward	United States	20	Franklin, TN
Jake Wise	Forward	United States	21	Reading, MA; transfer from Boston University; selected 69th overall in 2018

== Roster ==
As of August 23, 2021.

No.	Nat.	Player	Class	Pos	Height	Weight	DoB	Hometown	Previous team	NHL rights
2	(United States)	James Marooney	Junior	D	5' 9" (1.75 m)	165 lb (75 kg)	1999-08-16	Chaska, Minnesota	Waterloo Black Hawks (USHL)	—
3	(United States)	Cole McWard	Freshman	D	6' 1" (1.85 m)	192 lb (87 kg)	2001-06-09	Fenton, Missouri	Tri-City Storm (USHL)	—
4	(United States)	Mason Lohrei	Freshman	D	6' 4" (1.93 m)	200 lb (91 kg)	2001-01-07	Madison, Wisconsin	Green Bay Gamblers (USHL)	BOS, 58th overall 2020
7	(Canada)	Evan McIntyre	Sophomore	D	5' 10" (1.78 m)	174 lb (79 kg)	2000-10-17	Oakville, Ontario	Penticton Vees (BCHL)	—
9	(United States)	Dominic Vidoli	Junior	D	6' 0" (1.83 m)	190 lb (86 kg)	1999-06-23	Wake Forest, North Carolina	Sioux City Musketeers (USHL)	—
10	(Russia)	Georgii Merkulov	Freshman	F	5' 11" (1.8 m)	180 lb (82 kg)	2000-10-10	Ryazan, Russia	Youngstown Phantoms (USHL)	—
11	(United States)	Kamil Sadlocha	Junior	F	5' 11" (1.8 m)	185 lb (84 kg)	1999-04-12	Carpentersville, Illinois	Madison Capitols (USHL)	—
13	(United States)	Tate Singleton	Junior	F	5' 9" (1.75 m)	177 lb (80 kg)	1998-09-05	West Lebanon, New Hampshire	Central Illinois Flying Aces (USHL)	—
14	(United States)	Dalton Messina	Junior	F	5' 11" (1.8 m)	195 lb (88 kg)	1998-03-29	Macomb, Michigan	Youngstown Phantoms (USHL)	—
15	(United States)	Cam Thiesing	Freshman	F	6' 0" (1.83 m)	184 lb (83 kg)	2001-03-26	Nashville, Tennessee	Green Bay Gamblers (USHL)	—
16	(United States)	Quinn Preston (A)	Senior	F	5' 11" (1.8 m)	182 lb (83 kg)	1997-10-21	Trenton, Michigan	Dubuque Fighting Saints (USHL)	—
17	(United States)	Mark Cheremeta	Junior	F	5' 11" (1.8 m)	185 lb (84 kg)	1999-07-12	Parkland, Florida	Dubuque Fighting Saints (USHL)	—
18	(United States)	Michael Gildon	Sophomore	F	6' 2" (1.88 m)	196 lb (89 kg)	2001-06-21	Plano, Texas	USNTDP (USHL)	—
20	(United States)	Matt Cassidy	Junior	F	6' 0" (1.83 m)	187 lb (85 kg)	1999-07-31	Medford, New Jersey	Youngstown Phantoms (USHL)	—
21	(United States)	Joe Dunlap	Sophomore	F	6' 0" (1.83 m)	185 lb (84 kg)	1999-11-30	Windham, New Hampshire	Fargo Force (USHL)	—
24	(Canada)	Ryan O'Connell	Senior	D	6' 1" (1.85 m)	185 lb (84 kg)	1999-04-25	Manotick, Ontario	Penticton Vees (BCHL)	TOR, 203rd overall 2017
26	(Canada)	Jaedon Leslie (A)	Junior	F	6' 1" (1.85 m)	187 lb (85 kg)	1998-08-04	St. Albert, Alberta	Fort McMurray Oil Barons (AJHL)	—
27	(United States)	Eric Cooley	Graduate	F	5' 9" (1.75 m)	185 lb (84 kg)	1998-05-05	Pittsburgh, Pennsylvania	Niagara (AHA)	—
28	(United States)	Jake Wise	Senior	F	5' 10" (1.78 m)	185 lb (84 kg)	2000-02-28	Reading, Massachusetts	Boston University (HEA)	CHI, 69th overall 2018
29	(Sweden)	Gustaf Westlund (C)	Senior	F	6' 0" (1.83 m)	175 lb (79 kg)	1997-12-12	Stockholm, Sweden	Lincoln Stars (USHL)	—
30	(United States)	Ryan Snowden	Junior	G	6' 3" (1.91 m)	205 lb (93 kg)	1998-03-06	Lincoln University, Pennsylvania	Central Illinois Flying Aces (USHL)	—
33	(United States)	Will Riedell (C)	Graduate	D	6' 1" (1.85 m)	205 lb (93 kg)	1996-10-09	Greensboro, North Carolina	Lake Superior State (WCHA)	—
34	(United States)	Reilly Herbst	Freshman	G	6' 0" (1.83 m)	185 lb (84 kg)	2000-02-17	Niwot, Colorado	Omaha Lancers (USHL)	—
44	(Czech Republic)	Jakub Dobeš	Freshman	G	6' 4" (1.93 m)	198 lb (90 kg)	2001-05-27	Ostrava, Czech Republic	Omaha Lancers (USHL)	MTL, 136th overall 2020
61	(United States)	Grant Gabriele	Senior	D	6' 2" (1.88 m)	197 lb (89 kg)	1997-04-17	Brighton, Michigan	Waterloo Black Hawks (USHL)	—
65	(United States)	C. J. Regula	Junior	D	6' 3" (1.91 m)	205 lb (93 kg)	1998-05-29	Bloomfield Hills, Michigan	Shreveport Mudbugs (NAHL)	—
71	(United States)	Patrick Guzzo	Sophomore	F	6' 3" (1.91 m)	198 lb (90 kg)	2001-11-27	Marysville, Michigan	Waterloo Black Hawks (USHL)	—
94	(Sweden)	Travis Treloar	Sophomore	F	5' 11" (1.8 m)	177 lb (80 kg)	2001-05-12	Kalmar, Sweden	Lincoln Stars (USHL)	—

== Standings ==
2021–22 Big Ten ice hockey Standings
	Conference record										Overall record					
	GP	W	L	T	OTW	OTL	3/SW	PTS	GF	GA	GP	W	L	T	GF	GA
#5 Minnesota †	24	18	6	0	1	2	0	55	90	50	39	26	13	0	138	91
#2 Michigan *	24	16	8	0	0	3	0	51	91	59	42	31	10	1	167	94
#9 Notre Dame	24	17	7	0	5	1	0	47	74	55	40	28	12	0	122	75
#16 Ohio State	24	13	9	2	1	1	1	42	76	59	37	22	13	2	125	87
Penn State	24	6	17	1	1	1	1	20	63	92	38	17	20	1	117	122
Wisconsin	24	6	17	1	1	2	0	20	53	96	37	10	24	3	76	132
Michigan State	24	6	18	0	1	0	0	17	51	87	36	12	23	1	76	119
Championship: March 19, 2022 † indicates conference regular season champion * indicates conference tournament champion Rankings: USCHO.com Top 20 Poll; updated April 7, 2022

== Schedule and results ==
Date	Time	Opponent^{#}	Rank^{#}	Site	TV	Decision	Result	Attendance	Record
Exhibition
October 2	4:00 PM	Western Michigan*		Value City Arena • Columbus, OH			L 1–3		
Regular Season
October 8	7:05 PM	at Bentley*		Bentley Arena • Waltham, MA		Snowden	L 1–2	1,585	0–1–0
October 9	6:05 PM	at Bentley*		Bentley Arena • Waltham, MA		Dobeš	W 7–1	1,359	1–1–0
October 15	7:05 PM	Connecticut*		Value City Arena • Columbus, OH		Snowden	W 4–3 ^{OT}	2,775	2–1–0
October 16	3:05 PM	Connecticut*		Value City Arena • Columbus, OH		Dobeš	W 3–0	2,446	3–1–0
October 29	6:00 PM	Michigan State		Value City Arena • Columbus, OH		Dobeš	L 1–2	3,324	3–2–0 (0–1–0)
October 30	2:00 PM	Michigan State		Value City Arena • Columbus, OH		Dobeš	W 5–1	2,826	4–2–0 (1–1–0)
November 5	7:00 PM	#16 Penn State		Value City Arena • Columbus, OH		Dobeš	W 5–2	4,376	5–2–0 (2–1–0)
November 6	5:00 PM	#16 Penn State		Value City Arena • Columbus, OH		Dobeš	W 4–1	3,941	6–2–0 (3–1–0)
November 12	7:30 PM	at #6 Minnesota	#18	3M Arena at Mariucci • Minneapolis, MN	BSN	Dobeš	W 4–3	7,511	7–2–0 (4–1–0)
November 13	6:00 PM	at #6 Minnesota	#18	3M Arena at Mariucci • Minneapolis, MN	BSN	Dobeš	L 0–2	7,294	7–3–0 (4–2–0)
November 26	5:00 PM	Mercyhurst*	#17	Value City Arena • Columbus, OH		Dobeš	L 4–5	3,277	7–4–0
November 27	5:00 PM	Mercyhurst*	#17	Value City Arena • Columbus, OH		Dobeš	W 3–2	2,554	8–4–0
December 3	7:30 PM	at #8 Notre Dame	#18	Compton Family Ice Arena • Notre Dame, IN	NBCSN	Dobeš	W 4–2	4,343	9–4–0 (5–2–0)
December 4	6:00 PM	at #8 Notre Dame	#18	Compton Family Ice Arena • Notre Dame, IN	NBCRN	Dobeš	L 1–5	5,117	9–5–0 (5–3–0)
December 10	7:00 PM	#3 Michigan	#17	Value City Arena • Columbus, OH (Rivalry)	BTN	Dobeš	L 2–5	7,324	9–6–0 (5–4–0)
December 11	8:00 PM	#3 Michigan	#17	Value City Arena • Columbus, OH (Rivalry)	BTN	Dobeš	W 6–1	6,928	10–6–0 (6–4–0)
December 16	7:00 PM	Bowling Green*	#17	Value City Arena • Columbus, OH	BTN	Dobeš	W 4–3 ^{OT}	5,232	11–6–0
December 17	7:07 PM	at Bowling Green*	#17	Slater Family Ice Arena • Bowling Green, OH		Dobeš	W 3–2	5,000	12–6–0
December 31	7:05 PM	Long Island*	#17	Value City Arena • Columbus, OH		Dobeš	W 6–0	2,958	13–6–0
January 1	7:05 PM	Long Island*	#17	Value City Arena • Columbus, OH		Snowden	W 7–2	2,621	14–6–0
January 8	6:00 PM	at Wisconsin	#17	Kohl Center • Madison, WI	BSW+	Dobeš	W 5–3	10,653	15–6–0 (7–4–0)
January 9	3:00 PM	at Wisconsin	#17	Kohl Center • Madison, WI	BSW	Dobeš	T 2–2 ^{SOW}	7,837	15–6–1 (7–4–1)
January 14	7:00 PM	#13 Notre Dame	#16	Value City Arena • Columbus, OH		Dobeš	L 2–3 ^{OT}	8,350	15–7–1 (7–5–1)
January 15	8:00 PM	#13 Notre Dame	#16	Value City Arena • Columbus, OH	BTN	Dobeš	W 4–1	6,114	16–7–1 (8–5–1)
January 21	7:00 PM	at Michigan State	#15	Munn Ice Arena • East Lansing, MI		Dobeš	W 4–1	4,728	17–7–1 (9–5–1)
January 22	6:00 PM	at Michigan State	#15	Munn Ice Arena • East Lansing, MI		Dobeš	W 3–2	6,203	18–7–1 (10–5–1)
January 28	7:00 PM	at Penn State	#12	Pegula Ice Arena • University Park, PA		Dobeš	T 2–2 ^{SOL}	6,059	18–7–2 (10–5–2)
January 29	7:00 PM	at Penn State	#12	Pegula Ice Arena • University Park, PA		Dobeš	W 6–0	6,229	19–7–2 (11–5–2)
February 4	7:00 PM	Wisconsin	#9	Value City Arena • Columbus, OH		Dobeš	W 4–3 ^{OT}	4,743	20–7–2 (12–5–2)
February 5	8:00 PM	Wisconsin	#9	Value City Arena • Columbus, OH	BTN	Dobeš	W 6–2	4,592	21–7–2 (13–5–2)
February 11	6:30 PM	#7 Minnesota	#8	Value City Arena • Columbus, OH	BTN	Dobeš	L 2–3	6,008	21–8–2 (13–6–2)
February 12	6:00 PM	#7 Minnesota	#8	Value City Arena • Columbus, OH	BTN	Dobeš	L 1–5	6,208	21–9–2 (13–7–2)
February 18	7:30 PM	at #2 Michigan	#11	Yost Ice Arena • Ann Arbor, MI (Rivalry)		Dobeš	L 3–5	5,800	21–10–2 (13–8–2)
February 19	8:30 PM	at #2 Michigan	#11	Yost Ice Arena • Ann Arbor, MI (Rivalry)	BTN	Dobeš	L 0–3	5,800	21–11–2 (13–9–2)
Big Ten Tournament
March 4	7:00 PM	Penn State*	#12	Value City Arena • Columbus, Ohio (Quarterfinal game 1)		Dobeš	W 4–3	2,039	22–11–2
March 5	7:00 PM	Penn State*	#12	Value City Arena • Columbus, Ohio (Quarterfinal game 2)		Dobeš	L 2–3	2,198	22–12–2
March 6	8:00 PM	Penn State*	#12	Value City Arena • Columbus, Ohio (Quarterfinal game 3)		Dobeš	L 1–2	1,188	22–13–2
*Non-conference game. ^{#}Rankings from USCHO.com Poll. All times are in Eastern Time. Source:

== Scoring statistics ==
Name	Position	Games	Goals	Assists	Points	PIM
Georgi Merkulov	F	36	20	14	34	10
Mason Lohrei	D	31	4	25	29	20
Jake Wise	C	35	10	18	28	2
Cam Thiesing	C	37	8	17	25	53
Grant Gabriele	D	37	5	15	20	12
Quinn Preston	F	31	7	12	19	55
Gustaf Westlund	C	37	8	8	16	38
Kamil Sadlocha	C	37	7	9	16	25
Cole McWard	D	36	4	12	16	2
Tate Singleton	F	37	10	5	15	28
Travis Treloar	C	36	7	7	14	4
Joseph Dunlap	F	32	7	6	13	28
Mark Cheremeta	LW	33	5	8	13	8
Patrick Guzzo	C/LW	31	6	6	12	16
Eric Cooley	RW	35	5	5	10	4
Will Riedell	D	33	3	7	10	31
Ryan O'Connell	D	30	0	10	10	10
James Marooney	D	31	1	8	9	33
Michael Gildon	LW	16	3	5	8	6
Dominic Vidoli	D	19	2	4	6	6
Jaedon Leslie	F	28	3	2	5	8
Matthew Cassidy	RW	12	0	4	4	21
Dalton Messina	F	3	0	2	2	0
Jakub Dobeš	G	35	0	2	2	2
C. J. Regula	D	7	0	1	1	6
Evan McIntyre	D	3	0	0	0	2
Ryan Snowden	G	6	0	0	0	0
Bench	-	-	-	-	-	14
Total			125	212	337	444

== Goaltending statistics ==
Name	Games	Minutes	Wins	Losses	Ties	Goals against	Saves	Shut outs	SV %	GAA
Jakub Dobeš	35	2043	21	12	2	77	1086	3	.934	2.26
Ryan Snowden	6	181	1	1	0	7	78	0	.918	2.31
Empty Net	-	15	-	-	-	3	-	-	-	-
Total	37	2240	22	13	2	87	1164	3	.930	2.33

== Rankings ==
Poll	Week																									
Poll	Pre	1	2	3	4	5	6	7	8	9	10	11	12	13	14	15	16	17	18	19	20	21	22	23	24	25 (Final)
USCHO.com	NR	NR	NR	NR	NR	NR	18	17	17	18	17	17	17	16	15	12	9	8	11	12	12	15	16	16	-	16
USA Today	NR	NR	NR	NR	NR	NR	14	NR	NR	NR	NR	NR	NR	15	15	11	8	7	12	12	12	15	NR	NR	NR	NR

Note: USCHO did not release a poll in week 24.

== Awards and honors ==
Player	Award	Ref
Jakub Dobeš	Big Ten Goaltender of the Year	
Jakub Dobeš	Big Ten Freshman of the Year	
Jakub Dobeš	Big Ten First Team	
Georgii Merkulov	Big Ten First Team	
Jakub Dobeš	Big Ten Rookie Team	
Mason Lohrei	Big Ten Rookie Team	
Georgii Merkulov	Big Ten Rookie Team	

== Players drafted into the NHL ==
=== 2022 NHL entry draft ===
Round	Pick	Player	NHL team
4	104	Stephen Halliday^{†}	Ottawa Senators

† incoming freshman
