= 2021–22 Penn State Nittany Lions men's ice hockey season =

- Conference: 5th Big Ten
- Home ice: Pegula Ice Arena

Rankings
- USCHO: NR
- USA Today: NR

Record
- Overall: 17–20–1
- Conference: 6–17–1
- Home: 6–9–1
- Road: 10–11–0
- Neutral: 1–0–0

Coaches and captains
- Head coach: Guy Gadowsky
- Assistant coaches: Keith Fisher; Juliano Pagliero; Matt Morrow
- Captain: Paul DeNaples
- Alternate captain(s): Connor McMenamin; Clayton Phillips; Adam Pilewicz

The 2021–22 Penn State Nittany Lions men's ice hockey season was the 16th season of play for the program. They represented Penn State University in the 2021–22 NCAA Division I men's ice hockey season. This season marked the ninth season in the Big Ten Conference. They were coached by Guy Gadowsky, in his 11th season, and played their home games at Pegula Ice Arena.

== Season ==
Penn State's season began with a bang and the Nittany Lions won six of their first seven games, culminating with a win over North Dakota at the Bridgestone Arena, the home of the Nashville Predators. The hot start got PSU its first ranking of the season but their circumstances quickly changed. As soon as they began their conference schedule, Penn State lost four game in a row with both their offense and defense crumbling. They recovered a bit at the end of November but the respite didn't last long and the Nittany Lions finished the first half of their season near the bottom of the Big Ten standings.

After a win over Army to kick off their second half, Penn State lost four consecutive game again and were wallowing at the bottom of their conference. Oskar Autio hadn't been playing well in goal and the team began to move away from his as the primary starter. Liam Soulière began sharing the load in goal and the team got a boost at the end of January when they made their only conference weekend sweep of the year. The offense then failed afterwards and Penn State lost another 5 games in a row before managing a split with Big Ten bottom-feeder Michigan State to close out the regular season.

The team's terrible season was supposed to end quickly against Ohio State, who were gearing up for the NCAA tournament. Instead of surrendering to expectations, the Lions fought hard against the Buckeyes; after losing the first game by just a goal, the offense bombarded the OSU cage with 81 shots in two games. Soulière held back the counterattack just enough to earn two 1-goal wins and Penn State knocked out #12 team in the country. The Lions were nearly able to pull off a stunning comeback the following game when they tied Minnesota after being down 0–2, but a late goal from the Gophers ultimately ended their season.

== Departures ==
Player	Position	Nationality	Cause
Evan Bell	Defenseman	United States	Graduation (retired)
Tim Doherty	Forward	United States	Graduation (signed with Allen Americans)
Bobby Hampton	Forward	United States	Graduation (retired)
William Holtforster	Goaltender	Canada	Graduation (retired)
Alex Limoges	Forward	United States	Graduation (signed with San Diego Gulls)
Max Sauvé	Forward	United States	Signed professional contract (Wheeling Nailers)
Sam Sternschein	Forward	United States	Graduate transfer to Boston College
Alex Stevens	Defenseman	United States	Graduation (signed with Wheeling Nailers)
Aarne Talvitie	Forward	Finland	Signed professional contract (New Jersey Devils)
Jared Westcott	Forward	United States	Transferred from Lake Superior State

== Recruiting ==
Player	Position	Nationality	Age	Notes
Ben Copeland	Forward	United States	22	Edina, MN; transfer from Colorado College
Doug Dorr	Goaltender	United States	22	Pittsburgh, PA; already completed one year of classes
Carson Dyck	Forward	Canada	20	Lethbridge, AB
Danny Dzhaniyev	Forward	United States	19	Brooklyn, NY
Ryan Kirwan	Forward	United States	19	DeWitt, NY
Dylan Lugris	Forward	Canada	20	Buffalo, NY; joined mid-season
Simon Mack	Defenseman	Canada	20	Brockville, ON
Ben Schoen	Forward	United States	19	Toledo, OH

== Roster ==
As of September 5, 2021.

No.	Nat.	Player	Class	Pos	Height	Weight	DoB	Hometown	Previous team	NHL rights
3	(United States)	Paul DeNaples (C)	Senior	D	6' 0" (1.83 m)	184 lb (83 kg)	1998-09-19	Moscow, Pennsylvania	Sioux Falls Stampede (USHL)	—
4	(Canada)	Simon Mack	Freshman	D	5' 10" (1.78 m)	180 lb (82 kg)	2001-03-29	Brockville, Ontario	Des Moines Buccaneers (USHL)	—
5	(United States)	Christian Berger	Sophomore	D	6' 0" (1.83 m)	182 lb (83 kg)	2000-05-22	St. Louis, Missouri	Omaha Lancers (USHL)	—
6	(United States)	Jimmy Dowd Jr.	Sophomore	D	5' 9" (1.75 m)	161 lb (73 kg)	2000-07-09	Point Pleasant Beach, New Jersey	Chicago Steel (USHL)	—
7	(Canada)	Carson Dyck	Freshman	F	6' 0" (1.83 m)	180 lb (82 kg)	2001-06-07	Lethbridge, Alberta	Okotoks Oilers (AJHL)	—
9	(United States)	Xander Lamppa	Sophomore	F	6' 1" (1.85 m)	205 lb (93 kg)	2000-04-30	Rochester, Minnesota	Waterloo Black Hawks (USHL)	—
10	(United States)	Christian Sarlo	Sophomore	F	6' 0" (1.83 m)	188 lb (85 kg)	2001-06-29	Lynbrook, New York	Lincoln Stars (USHL)	—
11	(United States)	Ryan Kirwan	Freshman	F	6' 2" (1.88 m)	195 lb (88 kg)	2002-02-27	DeWitt, New York	Green Bay Gamblers (USHL)	—
12	(United States)	Ben Schoen	Freshman	F	5' 8" (1.73 m)	150 lb (68 kg)	2002-05-18	Maumee, Ohio	Tri-City Storm (USHL)	—
13	(United States)	Danny Dzhaniyev	Freshman	F	5' 4" (1.63 m)	145 lb (66 kg)	2002-09-15	Brooklyn, New York	Dubuque Fighting Saints (USHL)	—
14	(United States)	Ben Copeland	Junior	F	6' 1" (1.85 m)	185 lb (84 kg)	1999-04-27	Edina, Minnesota	Colorado College (NCHC)	—
15	(United States)	Kenny Johnson	Junior	D	6' 4" (1.93 m)	230 lb (104 kg)	1998-05-28	Ann Arbor, Michigan	Victoria Grizzlies (BCHL)	—
16	(United States)	Dylan Lugris	Freshman	F	6' 2" (1.88 m)	185 lb (84 kg)	2001-06-23	Buffalo, New York	Jersey Hitmen (NCDC)	—
17	(United States)	Chase McLane	Sophomore	F	6' 2" (1.88 m)	183 lb (83 kg)	2000-04-22	Trenton, Michigan	Tri-City Storm (USHL)	NSH, 209th overall 2020
18	(United States)	Clayton Phillips (A)	Graduate	D	6' 0" (1.83 m)	195 lb (88 kg)	1999-09-09	Edina, Minnesota	Minnesota (Big Ten)	PIT, 93rd overall 2017
19	(United States)	Connor McMenamin (A)	Junior	F	5' 11" (1.8 m)	185 lb (84 kg)	1999-02-25	Collegeville, Pennsylvania	Tri-City Storm (USHL)	—
21	(United States)	Kevin Wall	Junior	F	6' 1" (1.85 m)	190 lb (86 kg)	2000-02-01	Penfield, New York	Chilliwack Chiefs (BCHL)	CAR, 181st overall 2019
23	(United States)	Tyler Paquette	Sophomore	F	6' 3" (1.91 m)	200 lb (91 kg)	2001-03-18	Collegeville, Pennsylvania	Green Bay Gamblers (USHL)	—
24	(United States)	Adam Pilewicz (A)	Graduate	D	6' 1" (1.85 m)	180 lb (82 kg)	1996-07-20	Sewickley, Pennsylvania	Johnstown Tomahawks (NAHL)	—
28	(United States)	Tyler Gratton	Junior	F	6' 2" (1.88 m)	187 lb (85 kg)	1999-08-06	Pottstown, Pennsylvania	Central Illinois Flying Aces (USHL)	—
29	(Canada)	Connor MacEachern	Junior	F	5' 10" (1.78 m)	175 lb (79 kg)	1999-07-01	Brooklin, Ontario	Youngstown Phantoms (USHL)	—
30	(United States)	Doug Dorr	Sophomore	G	6' 4" (1.93 m)	200 lb (91 kg)	1999-05-07	Pittsburgh, Pennsylvania	Utica Jr. Comets (NCDC)	—
31	(Canada)	Liam Soulière	Sophomore	G	5' 11" (1.8 m)	180 lb (82 kg)	1999-03-16	Brampton, Ontario	Victoria Grizzlies (BCHL)	—
35	(Finland)	Oskar Autio	Senior	G	6' 0" (1.83 m)	183 lb (83 kg)	1999-10-06	Espoo, Finland	Chicago Steel (USHL)	—
	(Canada)	Mason Snell	Junior	D	6' 0" (1.83 m)	190 lb (86 kg)	2000-06-18	Courtice, Ontario	Penticton Vees (BCHL)	—

== Standings ==
2021–22 Big Ten ice hockey Standings
	Conference record										Overall record					
	GP	W	L	T	OTW	OTL	3/SW	PTS	GF	GA	GP	W	L	T	GF	GA
#5 Minnesota †	24	18	6	0	1	2	0	55	90	50	39	26	13	0	138	91
#2 Michigan *	24	16	8	0	0	3	0	51	91	59	42	31	10	1	167	94
#9 Notre Dame	24	17	7	0	5	1	0	47	74	55	40	28	12	0	122	75
#16 Ohio State	24	13	9	2	1	1	1	42	76	59	37	22	13	2	125	87
Penn State	24	6	17	1	1	1	1	20	63	92	38	17	20	1	117	122
Wisconsin	24	6	17	1	1	2	0	20	53	96	37	10	24	3	76	132
Michigan State	24	6	18	0	1	0	0	17	51	87	36	12	23	1	76	119
Championship: March 19, 2022 † indicates conference regular season champion * indicates conference tournament champion Rankings: USCHO.com Top 20 Poll; updated April 7, 2022

== Schedule and results ==
Date	Time	Opponent^{#}	Rank^{#}	Site	TV	Decision	Result	Attendance	Record
Regular Season
October 3	3:00 PM	Long Island*		Pegula Ice Arena • University Park, PA		Autio	W 3–1	5,795	1–0–0
October 4	7:00 PM	Long Island*		Pegula Ice Arena • University Park, PA		Autio	W 5–2	5,592	2–0–0
October 8	7:00 PM	Canisius*		Pegula Ice Arena • University Park, PA		Autio	L 1–4	5,996	2–1–0
October 9	1:00 PM	Canisius*		Pegula Ice Arena • University Park, PA		Soulière	W 5–2	6,020	3–1–0
October 21	7:00 PM	Niagara*		Pegula Ice Arena • University Park, PA		Autio	W 4–0	5,547	4–1–0
October 22	7:00 PM	Niagara*		Pegula Ice Arena • University Park, PA		Soulière	W 6–2	5,597	5–1–0
October 30	8:07 PM	vs. #6 North Dakota*		Bridgestone Arena • Nashville, TN (US Hockey Hall of Fame Game)		Autio	W 6–4	14,659	6–1–0
November 5	7:00 PM	at Ohio State	#16	Value City Arena • Columbus, OH		Soulière	L 2–5	4,376	6–2–0 (0–1–0)
November 6	5:00 PM	at Ohio State	#16	Value City Arena • Columbus, OH		Autio	L 1–4	3,941	6–3–0 (0–2–0)
November 11	8:30 PM	#2 Michigan	#19	Pegula Ice Arena • University Park, PA	BTN	Autio	L 1–5	6,128	6–4–0 (0–3–0)
November 12	7:00 PM	#2 Michigan	#19	Pegula Ice Arena • University Park, PA		Soulière	L 2–6	6,437	6–5–0 (0–4–0)
November 19	8:00 PM	at #7 Minnesota		3M Arena at Mariucci • Minneapolis, MN	BSN	Autio	W 5–3	7,426	7–5–0 (1–4–0)
November 20	9:00 PM	at #7 Minnesota		3M Arena at Mariucci • Minneapolis, MN	BSN	Autio	L 2–4	7,309	7–6–0 (1–5–0)
November 23	8:07 PM	at St. Thomas*		St. Thomas Ice Arena • Mendota Heights, MN		Autio	W 5–1	559	8–6–0
November 24	8:07 PM	at St. Thomas*		St. Thomas Ice Arena • Mendota Heights, MN		Soulière	W 4–1	544	9–6–0
December 3	7:00 PM	Michigan State		Pegula Ice Arena • University Park, PA		Autio	W 4–2	6,008	10–6–0 (2–5–0)
December 4	5:00 PM	Michigan State		Pegula Ice Arena • University Park, PA		Autio	L 3–4	6,144	10–7–0 (2–6–0)
December 10	8:00 PM	at Wisconsin		Kohl Center • Madison, WI	BSW	Autio	L 1–4	9,369	10–8–0 (2–7–0)
December 11	7:00 PM	at Wisconsin		Kohl Center • Madison, WI	BSW	Autio	W 5–4 ^{OT}	10,176	11–8–0 (3–7–0)
January 1	5:05 PM	at Army*		Tate Rink • West Point, NY		Autio	W 5–3	1,160	12–8–0
January 7	7:00 PM	#13 Notre Dame		Pegula Ice Arena • University Park, PA		Autio	L 2–4	5,639	12–9–0 (3–8–0)
January 8	5:00 PM	#13 Notre Dame		Pegula Ice Arena • University Park, PA		Autio	L 4–5 ^{OT}	5,871	12–10–0 (3–9–0)
January 14	7:30 PM	at #4 Michigan		Yost Ice Arena • Ann Arbor, MI		Autio	L 2–3	5,800	12–11–0 (3–10–0)
January 15	7:00 PM	at #4 Michigan		Yost Ice Arena • Ann Arbor, MI		Autio	L 3–4	5,800	12–12–0 (3–11–0)
January 21	7:00 PM	at Wisconsin		Pegula Ice Arena • University Park, PA		Soulière	W 4–1	6,008	13–12–0 (4–11–0)
January 22	6:00 PM	at Wisconsin		Pegula Ice Arena • University Park, PA		Autio	W 7–2	6,247	14–12–0 (5–11–0)
January 28	7:00 PM	#12 Ohio State		Pegula Ice Arena • University Park, PA		Soulière	T 2–2 ^{SOW}	6,059	14–12–1 (5–11–1)
January 29	7:00 PM	#12 Ohio State		Pegula Ice Arena • University Park, PA		Autio	L 0–6	6,059	14–13–1 (5–12–1)
February 4	7:30 PM	at #13 Notre Dame		Compton Family Ice Arena • Notre Dame, IN	Peacock	Soulière	L 2–7	4,358	14–14–1 (5–13–1)
February 5	6:00 PM	at #13 Notre Dame		Compton Family Ice Arena • Notre Dame, IN	Peacock	Autio	L 0–3	4,678	14–15–1 (5–14–1)
February 18	6:30 PM	#5 Minnesota		Pegula Ice Arena • University Park, PA	BTN	Soulière	L 1–3	6,043	14–16–1 (5–15–1)
February 19	6:00 PM	#5 Minnesota		Pegula Ice Arena • University Park, PA	BTN	Autio	L 4–6	6,216	14–17–1 (5–16–1)
February 25	7:00 PM	at Michigan State		Munn Ice Arena • East Lansing, MI		Soulière	W 5–3	4,940	15–17–1 (6–16–1)
February 26	6:00 PM	at Michigan State		Munn Ice Arena • East Lansing, MI		Soulière	L 1–2	6,122	15–18–1 (6–17–1)
Big Ten Tournament
March 4	7:00 PM	at #12 Ohio State*		Value City Arena • Columbus, Ohio (Quarterfinal game 1)		Soulière	L 3–4	2,039	15–19–1
March 5	7:00 PM	at #12 Ohio State*		Value City Arena • Columbus, Ohio (Quarterfinal game 2)		Soulière	W 3–2	2,198	16–19–1
March 6	8:00 PM	at #12 Ohio State*		Value City Arena • Columbus, Ohio (Quarterfinal game 3)		Soulière	W 2–1	1,188	17–19–1
March 12	9:00 PM	at #2 Minnesota*		3M Arena at Mariucci • Minneapolis, MN (Semifinal)	BTN	Soulière	L 2–3	6,856	17–20–1
*Non-conference game. ^{#}Rankings from USCHO.com Poll. All times are in Eastern Time. Source:

== Scoring statistics ==
Name	Position	Games	Goals	Assists	Points	PIM
Kevin Wall	RW	38	16	13	29	32
Connor MacEachern	F	36	14	14	28	16
Ryan Kirwan	F	36	13	13	26	8
Ben Copeland	C	33	6	17	23	10
Ben Schoen	C	37	6	16	22	39
Jimmy Dowd	D	37	3	18	21	32
Danny Dzhaniyev	F	36	6	12	18	6
Tyler Paquette	RW	36	11	4	15	6
Connor McMenamin	LW	38	5	10	15	25
Christian Berger	LW	38	2	13	15	6
Chase McLane	C/RW	30	3	10	13	22
Tyler Gratton	RW	37	9	3	12	24
Clayton Phillips	D	32	5	7	12	16
Christian Sarlo	F	38	5	7	12	16
Carson Dyck	F	29	1	10	11	16
Xander Lamppa	F	29	2	6	8	2
Paul DeNaples	D	38	2	6	8	29
Adam Pilewicz	D	38	3	4	7	8
Simon Mack	D	37	0	7	7	14
Dylan Lugris	F	17	4	1	5	4
Kenny Johnson	D	31	1	4	5	46
Oskar Autio	G	23	0	4	4	0
Doug Dorr	G	1	0	0	0	0
Liam Soulière	G	15	0	0	0	0
Bench	-	-	-	-	-	2
Total			117	199	316	379

== Goaltending statistics ==
Name	Games	Minutes	Wins	Losses	Ties	Goals against	Saves	Shut outs	SV %	GAA
Doug Dorr	1	5:19	0	0	0	0	1	0	1.000	0.00
Liam Soulière	15	897	7	7	1	43	409	0	.905	2.88
Oskar Autio	23	1367	10	13	0	71	591	1	.893	3.12
Empty Net	-	42	-	-	-	6	-	-	-	-
Total	38	2311	17	20	1	122	1001	1	.891	3.17

== Rankings ==
Poll	Week																									
Poll	Pre	1	2	3	4	5	6	7	8	9	10	11	12	13	14	15	16	17	18	19	20	21	22	23	24	25 (Final)
USCHO.com	NR	NR	NR	NR	NR	16	19	NR	NR	NR	NR	NR	NR	NR	NR	NR	NR	NR	NR	NR	NR	NR	NR	NR	-	NR
USA Today	NR	NR	NR	NR	NR	NR	NR	NR	NR	NR	NR	NR	NR	NR	NR	NR	NR	NR	NR	NR	NR	NR	NR	NR	NR	NR

Note: USCHO did not release a poll in week 24.
