= 2022 Big Ten men's ice hockey tournament =

- Dates: March 4–19, 2022
- Teams: 7
- Finals site: 3M Arena at Mariucci; Minneapolis, Minnesota
- Champions: Michigan (2nd title)
- Winning coach: Mel Pearson (1st title)
- MVP: Erik Portillo (Michigan)
- Big Ten men's Ice Hockey Tournaments

The 2022 Big Ten Conference Men's Ice Hockey Tournament was the ninth tournament in conference history. It was played between March 4 and March 19, 2022, on-campus locations. As the tournament winner, Michigan earned the Big Ten's automatic bid to the 2022 NCAA Division I Men's Ice Hockey Tournament.

== Format ==
The tournament featured a format with all games taking place on the campus of the higher-seeded teams. The tournament opened with three best-of-three quarterfinal series, as the second, third and fourth-seeded teams each hosted a series. The top-seeded team had a bye to the single-elimination semifinals. The highest-seeded team remaining after the semifinals hosted the championship game.

== Conference standings ==
2021–22 Big Ten ice hockey Standings
	Conference record										Overall record					
	GP	W	L	T	OTW	OTL	3/SW	PTS	GF	GA	GP	W	L	T	GF	GA
#5 Minnesota †	24	18	6	0	1	2	0	55	90	50	39	26	13	0	138	91
#2 Michigan *	24	16	8	0	0	3	0	51	91	59	42	31	10	1	167	94
#9 Notre Dame	24	17	7	0	5	1	0	47	74	55	40	28	12	0	122	75
#16 Ohio State	24	13	9	2	1	1	1	42	76	59	37	22	13	2	125	87
Penn State	24	6	17	1	1	1	1	20	63	92	38	17	20	1	117	122
Wisconsin	24	6	17	1	1	2	0	20	53	96	37	10	24	3	76	132
Michigan State	24	6	18	0	1	0	0	17	51	87	36	12	23	1	76	119
Championship: March 19, 2022 † indicates conference regular season champion * indicates conference tournament champion Rankings: USCHO.com Top 20 Poll; updated April 7, 2022

== Bracket ==
Teams were reseeded for the semifinals

Quarterfinals; March 4–6
2	Michigan	4	8	—
7	Michigan State	1	0	—
3	Notre Dame	1	3	4
6	Wisconsin	3	2	2
4	Ohio State	4	2	1
5	Penn State	3	3	2

Semifinals; March 12
1	Minnesota	3
5	Penn State	2
2	Michigan	2
3	Notre Dame	1

Championship; March 19
1	Minnesota	3
2	Michigan	4

Note: * denotes overtime periods.

== Results ==
=== Quarterfinals ===
==== (2) Michigan vs. (7) Michigan State ====
March 4	Michigan State	1 – 4	Michigan	Yost Ice Arena	Recap
Dennis Cesana – (Nash Nienhuis, Tanner Tanner) – pp – 4:36		First period	8:04 – pp – Matty Beniers – (Thomas Bordeleau, Nick Blankenburg)
No scoring		Second period	3:53 – Luke Hughes – (Jacob Truscott, Dylan Duke); 9:31 – Luke Morgan – (Kent Johnson, Nick Blankenburg)
No scoring		Third period	3:29 – Mackie Samoskevich – (Unassisted)
Drew DeRidder (24 saves / 28 shots)		Goalie stats	Erik Portillo (23 saves / 24 shots)

March 5	Michigan State	0 – 8	Michigan	Yost Ice Arena	Recap
No scoring		First period	0:54 – Thomas Bordeleau – (Luke Hughes, Erik Portillo); 4:25 – Michael Pastujov – (Kent Johnson, Thomas Bordeleau); 7:23 – Dylan Duke – (Nick Blankenburg, Johnny Beecher); 10:51 – sh – Kent Johnson – (Unassisted)
No scoring		Second period	2:12 – Johnny Beecher – (Ethan Edwards, Nick Blankenburg); 13:42 – pp – Mackie Samoskevich – (Luke Hughes, Nick Blankenburg); 14:25 – pp – Johnny Beecher – (Michael Pastujov, Jacob Truscott); 15:07 – pp – Nick Blankenburg – (Luke Hughes, Erik Portillo)
No scoring		Third period	No scoring
Drew DeRidder (1 save / 4 shots); Pierce Charleson (32 saves / 37 shots)		Goalie stats	Erik Portillo (23 saves / 23 shots); Jack Leavy (1 save / 1 shot)

Michigan won series 2–0

==== (3) Notre Dame vs. (6) Wisconsin ====
March 4	Wisconsin	3 – 1	Notre Dame	Compton Family Ice Arena	Recap
Brock Caufield – (Mathieu De St. Phalle, Carson Bantle) – 15:22		First period	No scoring
Dominick Mersch – (Tyler Inamoto, Corson Ceulemans) – 14:30		Second period	13:52 – pp – Graham Slaggert – (Nick Leivermann, Ryder Rolston)
Zach Urdahl – (Sam Stange) – 5:57		Third period	No scoring
Jared Moe (49 saves / 50 shots)		Goalie stats	Matthew Galajda (24 saves / 27 shots)

March 5	Wisconsin	2 – 3	Notre Dame	Compton Family Ice Arena	Recap
No scoring		First period	1:41 – pp – Graham Slaggert – (Landon Slaggert, Ryder Rolston); 16:07 – Zach Plucinski – (Jake Pivonka, Nick Leivermann)
Roman Ahcan – (Mathieu De St. Phalle, Corson Ceulemans) – pp – 9:53		Second period	No scoring
Carson Bantle – (Brock Caufield, Mathieu De St. Phalle) – pp – 3:23		Third period	19:39 – Trevor Janicke – (Spencer Stastney, Graham Slaggert)
Jared Moe (30 saves / 33 shots)		Goalie stats	Matthew Galajda (34 saves / 36 shots)

March 6	Wisconsin	2 – 4	Notre Dame	Compton Family Ice Arena	Recap
Sam Stange – (Liam Malmquist, Jack Gorniak) – 16:01		First period	11:22 – Jack Adams – (Hunter Strand, Nick Leivermann); 14:14 – pp – Landon Slaggert – (Graham Slaggert, Trevor Janicke)
Daniel Laatsch – (Roman Ahcan, Dominick Mersch) – 15:22		Second period	1:55 – Jake Pivonka – (Jesse Lansdell, Adam Karashik)
No scoring		Third period	19:18 – en – Trevor Janicke – (Graham Slaggert)
Jared Moe (29 saves / 32 shots)		Goalie stats	Matthew Galajda (24 saves / 26 shots)

Notre Dame won series 2–1

==== (4) Ohio State vs. (5) Penn State ====
March 4	Penn State	3 – 4	Ohio State	Value City Arena	Recap
No scoring		First period	No scoring
No scoring		Second period	16:00 – Georgii Merkulov – (CJ Regula); 17:13 – Eric Cooley – (Patrick Patrick, Cole McWard)
Tyler Paquette – (Xander Lamppa, Carson Dyck) – 7:53; Connor McMenamin – (Christian Sarlo, Kenny Johnson) – 9:56; Kenny Johnson – (Connor MacEachern, Simon Mack) – 17:10		Third period	2:19 – Quinn Preston – (Cam Thiesing); 16:52 – Georgii Merkulov – (Unassisted)
Liam Soulière (27 saves / 31 shots)		Goalie stats	Jakub Dobeš (49 saves / 52 shots)

March 5	Penn State	3 – 2	Ohio State	Value City Arena	Recap
Dylan Lugris – (Connor McMenamin, Christian Berger) – 19:30		First period	No scoring
Kevin Wall – (Ryan Kirwan, Ben Schoen) – 17:12		Second period	13:55 – pp – Michael Gildon – (Travis Treloar, Will Riedell)
Ryan Kirwan – (Christian Berger, Ben Schoen) – 17:19		Third period	9:33 – Cole McWard – (Kamil Sadlocha, Ryan O'Connell)
Liam Soulière (33 saves / 35 shots)		Goalie stats	Jakub Dobeš (43 saves / 46 shots)

March 6	Penn State	2 – 1	Ohio State	Value City Arena
No scoring		First period	No scoring
Ryan Kirwan – (Ben Schoen, Adam Pilewicz) – 13:30		Second period	18:52– Tate Singleton – (Jake Wise, James Marooney)
Dylan Lugris – (Paul DeNaples, Connor MacEachern) – 13:30		Third period	No scoring
Liam Soulière (23 saves / 24 shots)		Goalie stats	Jakub Dobeš (33 saves / 35 shots)

Penn State won series 2–1

=== Semifinals ===
==== (1) Minnesota vs. (5) Penn State ====
March 12	Penn State	2 – 3	Minnesota	3M Arena at Mariucci	Recap
No scoring		First period	12:04 – Ben Meyers – (Ryan Johnson, Brock Faber)
Tyler Paquette – (Ben Meyers, Aaron Huglen) – 14:58; Dylan Lugris – (Connor MacEachern, Ben Schoen) – pp – 17:35		Second period	0:27 – pp – Jackson LaCombe – (Ben Meyers, Aaron Huglen)
No scoring		Third period	17:21 – Sammy Walker – (Blake McLaughlin, Bryce Brodzinski)
Liam Souliere (22 saves / 25 shots)		Goalie stats	Justen Close (28 saves / 30 shots)

==== (2) Michigan vs. (3) Notre Dame ====
March 12	Notre Dame	1 – 2	Michigan	Yost Ice Arena	Recap
No scoring		First period	No scoring
Jack Adams – (Adam Karashik, Justin Janicke) – 12:04		Second period	3:46 – Matty Beniers – (Brendan Brisson, Kent Johnson)
No scoring		Third period	3:59 – Brendan Brisson – (Matty Beniers, Jacob Truscott)
Matthew Galajda (29 saves / 31 shots)		Goalie stats	Erik Portillo (19 saves / 20 shots)

=== Championship ===
==== (1) Minnesota vs. (2) Michigan ====
March 19	Michigan	4 – 3	Minnesota	3M Arena at Mariucci	Recap
Brendan Brisson – (Matty Beniers, Luke Hughes) – 1:17; Mackie Samoskevich – (John Beecher) – 17:51		First period	0:32 – Jaxon Nelson – (Jackson LaCombe, Grant Cruikshank)
Dylan Duke – (Mackie Samoskevich, Thomas Bordeleau) – 2:07; Kent Johnson – (Brendan Brisson, Thomas Bordeleau) – pp – 7:26		Second period	No scoring
No scoring		Third period	19:02 – pp – Matthew Knies – (Jackson LaCombe, Blake McLaughlin); 19:54 – pp – Matthew Knies – (Jackson LaCombe, Ben Meyers)
Erik Portillo (25 saves / 28 shots)		Goalie stats	Justen Close (27 saves / 31 shots)

== Tournament awards ==
=== All-Tournament Team ===
- G: Erik Portillo * (Michigan)
- D: Jackson LaCombe (Minnesota)
- D: Luke Hughes (Michigan)
- F: Mackie Samoskevich (Michigan)
- F: Brendan Brisson (Michigan)
- F: Matty Beniers (Michigan)

* Most Outstanding Player
