= 2021–22 Michigan State Spartans men's ice hockey season =

- Conference: 7th Big Ten
- Home ice: Munn Ice Arena

Rankings
- USCHO: NR
- USA Today: NR

Record
- Overall: 12–23–1
- Conference: 6–18–0
- Home: 9–11–0
- Road: 3–11–1
- Neutral: 0–1–0

Coaches and captains
- Head coach: Danton Cole
- Assistant coaches: Chris Luongo; Joe Exter; Dylan Strom
- Captain: Dennis Cesana
- Alternate captain(s): Mitchell Lewandowski; Josh Nodler

The 2021–22 Michigan State Spartans men's ice hockey season was the 80th season of play for the program. They represented Michigan State University in the 2021–22 NCAA Division I men's ice hockey season. This season marked the 32nd season in the Big Ten Conference. They were coached by Danton Cole, in his fifth season, and played their home games at Munn Ice Arena.

== Season ==
Michigan State began the season well, posting a winning record through the first month of the season. After dropping both games to arch-rival Michigan, the Spartans dipped below .500 but they responded with four consecutive wins to get back onto the plus side of the ledger. MSU ended the first half of their season with a split against Notre Dame, putting them in a strong position to make a run for a home game in the postseason.

Unfortunately, both the team's offense and defense faltered in the back half of their campaign and the Spartans lost 13 consecutive games. Both goaltenders played during the stretch and performed well, but neither received much help. MSU allowed an average of 37 shots per game, while recording just 27 of their own. While most of their losses were against ranked teams, that would provide little solace as Michigan State finished last in the conference for the fourth time in five years.

They faced Michigan in the first round of the conference tournament and were thoroughly beaten, losing both games by a combined 1–12 score.

== Departures ==
Player	Position	Nationality	Cause
Tommy Apap	Forward	United States	Graduation (Signed with Indy Fuel)
Charlie Combs	Forward	United States	Graduation (Signed with Wichita Thunder)
Gianluca Esteves	Forward	Canada	Graduation (Signed with Cincinnati Cyclones)
Austin Kamer	Forward	United States	Graduation (retired)
Tommy Miller	Defenseman	United States	Graduate transfer to Northeastern
Jake Smith	Forward	United States	Graduation (retired)
Brody Stevens	Forward	United States	Graduation (retired)

== Recruiting ==
Player	Position	Nationality	Age	Notes
Christopher Berger	Forward	United States	23	Amherst, NY; graduate transfer from Brown
Jeremy Davidson	Forward	United States	21	Schoolcraft, MI; transfer from Massachusetts
David Gucciardi	Defenseman	Canada	18	Toronto, ON
Tanner Kelly	Forward	United States	19	San Diego, CA
Griffin Loughran	Forward	United States	22	Orchard Park, NY; transfer from Northern Michigan
Erik Middendorf	Forward	United States	21	Scottsdale, AZ; transfer from Colorado College
Jesse Tucker	Forward	Canada	21	Thunder Bay, ON

== Roster ==
As of August 12, 2021.

No.	Nat.	Player	Class	Pos	Height	Weight	DoB	Hometown	Previous team	NHL rights
1	(United States)	Drew DeRidder	Senior	G	5' 11" (1.8 m)	175 lb (79 kg)	2000-05-01	Fenton, Michigan	USNTDP (USHL)	—
2	(United States)	Aiden Gallacher	Sophomore	D	6' 1" (1.85 m)	200 lb (91 kg)	2000-03-20	Rochester Hills, Michigan	Youngstown Phantoms (USHL)	—
4	(Canada)	Nash Nienhuis	Sophomore	D	5' 10" (1.78 m)	176 lb (80 kg)	1999-12-05	Sarnia, Ontario	Omaha Lancers (USHL)	—
5	(Canada)	Powell Connor	Sophomore	D	6' 2" (1.88 m)	183 lb (83 kg)	2000-05-04	Vernon, British Columbia	Trail Smoke Eaters (BCHL)	—
6	(United States)	Cal Dybicz	Sophomore	D	6' 1" (1.85 m)	181 lb (82 kg)	2000-07-16	Elk Grove Village, Illinois	Tri-City Storm (USHL)	—
7	(Canada)	David Gucciardi	Freshman	D	6' 1" (1.85 m)	193 lb (88 kg)	2002-10-09	Toronto, Ontario	Waterloo Black Hawks (USHL)	—
8	(United States)	Cole Krygier	Senior	D	6' 2" (1.88 m)	196 lb (89 kg)	2000-05-05	Novi, Michigan	Lincoln Stars (USHL)	FLA, 201st overall 2018
9	(United States)	Mitchell Lewandowski (A)	Graduate	F	5' 9" (1.75 m)	178 lb (81 kg)	1998-04-17	Clarkston, Michigan	Chicago Steel (USHL)	—
10	(United States)	A. J. Hodges	Sophomore	F	6' 0" (1.83 m)	184 lb (83 kg)	2001-08-24	Littleton, Colorado	Sioux City Musketeers (USHL)	—
11	(United States)	Jeremy Davidson	Sophomore	F	5' 10" (1.78 m)	165 lb (75 kg)	2000-02-28	Kalamazoo, Michigan	Fargo Force (USHL)	—
13	(Hungary)	Kristóf Papp	Sophomore	F	5' 11" (1.8 m)	174 lb (79 kg)	2001-06-27	Budapest, Hungary	Des Moines Buccaneers (USHL)	—
14	(United States)	Adam Goodsir	Senior	F	6' 0" (1.83 m)	196 lb (89 kg)	1998-09-22	Okemos, Michigan	Tri-City Storm (USHL)	—
15	(United States)	Christian Krygier	Senior	D	6' 2" (1.88 m)	185 lb (84 kg)	2000-05-05	Novi, Michigan	Lincoln Stars (USHL)	NYI, 196th overall 2018
16	(Canada)	Jesse Tucker	Freshman	F	5' 11" (1.8 m)	193 lb (88 kg)	2000-03-01	Longlac, Ontario	Green Bay Gamblers (USHL)	—
17	(United States)	Kyle Haskins	Sophomore	F	5' 10" (1.78 m)	190 lb (86 kg)	2000-02-16	Huntington, Vermont	Waterloo Black Hawks (USHL)	—
18	(United States)	Griffin Loughran	Junior	F	5' 6" (1.68 m)	141 lb (64 kg)	1998-11-13	West Seneca, New York	Northern Michigan (WCHA)	—
19	(Switzerland)	Nicolas Müller	Junior	F	6' 0" (1.83 m)	182 lb (83 kg)	1999-06-21	Arisdorf, Switzerland	Modo J20 (J20 SuperElit)	—
20	(United States)	Josh Nodler (A)	Junior	F	5' 10" (1.78 m)	193 lb (88 kg)	2001-04-27	Oak Park, Michigan	Fargo Force (USHL)	CGY, 150th overall 2019
21	(United States)	Chris Berger	Junior	F	5' 9" (1.75 m)	185 lb (84 kg)	1998-04-14	Amherst, New York	Brown (ECAC)	—
22	(United States)	Dennis Cesana (C)	Senior	D	5' 9" (1.75 m)	182 lb (83 kg)	1998-04-04	Providence, Rhode Island	Brooks Bandits (AJHL)	—
23	(United States)	Jagger Joshua	Junior	F	6' 2" (1.88 m)	200 lb (91 kg)	1999-03-29	Dearborn, Michigan	Muskegon Lumberjacks (USHL)	—
24	(United States)	Erik Middendorf	Junior	F	6' 1" (1.85 m)	191 lb (87 kg)	2000-07-11	Scottsdale, Arizona	Chicago Steel (USHL)	—
26	(United States)	Tanner Kelly	Freshman	F	5' 10" (1.78 m)	165 lb (75 kg)	2002-05-11	San Diego, California	Muskegon Lumberjacks (USHL)	—
27	(United States)	Mitchell Mattson	Senior	F	6' 4" (1.93 m)	205 lb (93 kg)	1998-01-02	Grand Rapids, Minnesota	Sioux Falls Stampede (USHL)	CGY, 126th overall 2016
29	(Canada)	Pierce Charleson	Sophomore	G	6' 2" (1.88 m)	186 lb (84 kg)	2000-02-27	Aurora, Ontario	Brooks Bandits (AJHL)	—
30	(United States)	Jon Mor	Sophomore	G	6' 2" (1.88 m)	190 lb (86 kg)	2000-07-20	Highland Park, Illinois	Langley Rivermen (BCHL)	—

== Standings ==
2021–22 Big Ten ice hockey Standings
	Conference record										Overall record					
	GP	W	L	T	OTW	OTL	3/SW	PTS	GF	GA	GP	W	L	T	GF	GA
#5 Minnesota †	24	18	6	0	1	2	0	55	90	50	39	26	13	0	138	91
#2 Michigan *	24	16	8	0	0	3	0	51	91	59	42	31	10	1	167	94
#9 Notre Dame	24	17	7	0	5	1	0	47	74	55	40	28	12	0	122	75
#16 Ohio State	24	13	9	2	1	1	1	42	76	59	37	22	13	2	125	87
Penn State	24	6	17	1	1	1	1	20	63	92	38	17	20	1	117	122
Wisconsin	24	6	17	1	1	2	0	20	53	96	37	10	24	3	76	132
Michigan State	24	6	18	0	1	0	0	17	51	87	36	12	23	1	76	119
Championship: March 19, 2022 † indicates conference regular season champion * indicates conference tournament champion Rankings: USCHO.com Top 20 Poll; updated April 7, 2022

== Schedule and results ==
Date	Time	Opponent^{#}	Rank^{#}	Site	TV	Decision	Result	Attendance	Record
Exhibition
October 2	7:00 PM	at USNTDP*		USA Hockey Arena • Plymouth MI (Exhibition)			L 0–3		
Regular Season
October 8	7:00 PM	Air Force*		Munn Ice Arena • East Lansing, MI		DeRidder	L 2–3	4,420	0–1–0
October 9	7:00 PM	Air Force*		Munn Ice Arena • East Lansing, MI		Charleson	W 5–1	4,918	1–1–0
October 15	7:00 PM	Miami*		Munn Ice Arena • East Lansing, MI		Charleson	W 3–1	6,511	2–1–0
October 16	7:00 PM	Miami*		Munn Ice Arena • East Lansing, MI		DeRidder	W 2–1	5,010	3–1–0
October 22	7:15 PM	at Massachusetts Lowell*		Tsongas Center • Lowell, MA		DeRidder	T 2–2 ^{OT}	4,658	3–1–1
October 23	6:05 PM	at Massachusetts Lowell*		Tsongas Center • Lowell, MA		Charleson	L 0–4	3,468	3–2–1
October 29	6:00 PM	at Ohio State		Value City Arena • Columbus, OH		DeRidder	W 2–1	3,324	4–2–1 (1–0–0)
October 30	2:00 PM	at Ohio State		Value City Arena • Columbus, OH		DeRidder	L 1–5	2,826	4–3–1 (1–1–0)
November 5	7:30 PM	at #3 Michigan		Yost Ice Arena • Ann Arbor, MI (Rivalry)	BTN	Charleson	L 2–7	5,800	4–4–1 (1–2–0)
November 6	7:30 PM	#3 Michigan		Munn Ice Arena • East Lansing, MI (Rivalry)		DeRidder	L 2–3	6,705	4–5–1 (1–3–0)
November 11	7:00 PM	Ferris State*		Munn Ice Arena • East Lansing, MI		DeRidder	W 2–0	4,622	5–5–1
November 13	7:07 PM	Ferris State*		Munn Ice Arena • East Lansing, MI		DeRidder	W 4–3	2,490	6–5–1
November 19	7:00 PM	Wisconsin		Munn Ice Arena • East Lansing, MI		DeRidder	W 3–2	5,653	7–5–1 (2–3–0)
November 20	8:00 PM	Wisconsin		Munn Ice Arena • East Lansing, MI		DeRidder	W 5–2	5,009	8–5–1 (3–3–0)
December 3	7:00 PM	at Penn State		Pegula Ice Arena • University Park, PA		DeRidder	L 2–4	6,008	8–6–1 (3–4–0)
December 4	5:00 PM	at Penn State		Pegula Ice Arena • University Park, PA		Charleson	W 4–3	6,144	9–6–1 (4–4–0)
December 10	7:30 PM	at #8 Notre Dame		Compton Family Ice Arena • Notre Dame, IN	NBCSN	Charleson	L 2–3	4,046	9–7–1 (4–5–0)
December 11	7:00 PM	at #8 Notre Dame		Compton Family Ice Arena • Notre Dame, IN	NBCSN	DeRidder	W 1–0 ^{OT}	4,445	10–7–1 (5–5–0)
Great Lakes Invitational
December 29	7:00 PM	#4 Western Michigan*		Munn Ice Arena • East Lansing, MI (Great Lakes Invitational)		DeRidder	L 1–3	5,538	10–8–1
December 30	5:00 PM	#18 Michigan Tech*		Munn Ice Arena • East Lansing, MI (Great Lakes Invitational)		DeRidder	W 3–2 ^{OT}	5,564	11–8–1
Regular Season
January 7	6:30 PM	#9 Minnesota		Munn Ice Arena • East Lansing, MI	BTN	DeRidder	L 1–4	4,922	11–9–1 (5–6–0)
January 8	7:30 PM	#9 Minnesota		Munn Ice Arena • East Lansing, MI	BTN	Charleson	L 3–6	5,209	11–10–1 (5–7–0)
January 14	8:00 PM	at Wisconsin		Kohl Center • Madison, WI	BSW	DeRidder	L 2–5	8,572	11–11–1 (5–8–0)
January 15	9:00 PM	at Wisconsin		Kohl Center • Madison, WI	BSW	Charleson	L 2–3	10,946	11–12–1 (5–9–0)
January 21	7:00 PM	#15 Ohio State		Munn Ice Arena • East Lansing, MI		DeRidder	L 1–4	4,728	11–13–1 (5–10–0)
January 22	6:00 PM	#15 Ohio State		Munn Ice Arena • East Lansing, MI		DeRidder	L 2–3	6,203	11–14–1 (5–11–0)
February 4	8:00 PM	at #8 Minnesota		3M Arena at Mariucci • Minneapolis, MN	BSN	Charleson	L 2–4	7,824	11–15–1 (5–12–0)
February 5	6:00 PM	at #8 Minnesota		3M Arena at Mariucci • Minneapolis, MN	BSN	DeRidder	L 1–3	8,305	11–16–1 (5–13–0)
February 11	7:00 PM	at #4 Michigan		Yost Ice Arena • Ann Arbor, MI (Rivalry)		DeRidder	L 2–6	5,800	11–17–1 (5–14–0)
February 12	7:00 PM	vs. #4 Michigan		Little Caesars Arena • Detroit, MI (Rivalry)	BSD	DeRidder	L 3–7	16,289	11–18–1 (5–15–0)
February 18	7:00 PM	#12 Notre Dame		Munn Ice Arena • East Lansing, MI		Charleson	L 1–2	5,635	11–19–1 (5–16–0)
February 19	7:00 PM	#12 Notre Dame		Munn Ice Arena • East Lansing, MI		DeRidder	L 2–4	6,068	11–20–1 (5–17–0)
February 25	7:00 PM	Penn State		Munn Ice Arena • East Lansing, MI		Charleson	L 3–5	4,940	11–21–1 (5–18–0)
February 26	6:00 PM	Penn State		Munn Ice Arena • East Lansing, MI		DeRidder	W 2–1	6,122	12–21–1 (6–18–0)
Big Ten Tournament
March 4	7:00 PM	at #5 Michigan*		Yost Ice Arena • Ann Arbor, Michigan (Quarterfinal game 1)	FS2	DeRidder	L 1–4	3,741	12–22–1
March 5	7:00 PM	at #5 Michigan*		Yost Ice Arena • Ann Arbor, Michigan (Quarterfinal game 2)	BSD	DeRidder	L 0–8	5,429	12–23–1
*Non-conference game. ^{#}Rankings from USCHO.com Poll. All times are in Eastern Time. Source:

== Scoring statistics ==
Name	Position	Games	Goals	Assists	Points	PIM
Jesse Tucker	C	36	2	22	24	12
Jeremy Davidson	F	32	11	11	22	24
Erik Middendorf	LW	36	12	8	20	24
Mitchell Lewandowski	LW	21	7	12	19	12
Dennis Cesana	D	36	8	8	16	14
Joshua Nodler	C/RW	26	7	8	15	4
Nash Nienhuis	D	36	3	11	14	6
Griffin Loughran	F	22	3	9	12	34
Kristóf Papp	C	34	2	10	12	8
David Gucciardi	D	36	5	6	11	22
Cole Krygier	D	35	4	7	11	72
Jagger Joshua	F	36	2	6	8	68
Christian Krygier	D	36	2	6	8	79
Nicolas Müller	C/RW	36	1	5	6	18
Tanner Kelly	F	34	3	2	5	8
Adam Goodsir	F	36	2	2	4	39
A. J. Hodges	F	34	0	4	4	4
Mitchell Mattson	C	23	1	2	3	16
Aiden Gallacher	D	32	1	1	2	8
Drew DeRidder	G	25	0	2	2	0
Kyle Haskins	F	27	0	1	1	17
Pierce Charleson	G	12	0	0	0	0
Powell Connor	D	28	0	0	0	2
Bench	-	-	-	-	-	10
Total			76	142	218	501

== Goaltending statistics ==
Name	Games	Minutes	Wins	Losses	Ties	Goals against	Saves	Shut outs	SV %	GAA
Drew DeRidder	25	1449	9	15	1	71	799	2	.918	2.94
Pierce Charleson	12	707	3	8	0	43	406	0	.904	3.65
Empty Net	-	12	-	-	-	5	-	-	-	-
Total	36	2169	12	23	1	124	1205	2	.910	3.29

== Rankings ==
Poll	Week																									
Poll	Pre	1	2	3	4	5	6	7	8	9	10	11	12	13	14	15	16	17	18	19	20	21	22	23	24	25 (Final)
USCHO.com	NR	NR	NR	NR	NR	NR	NR	NR	NR	NR	NR	NR	NR	NR	NR	NR	NR	NR	NR	NR	NR	NR	NR	NR	-	NR
USA Today	NR	NR	NR	NR	NR	NR	NR	NR	NR	NR	NR	NR	NR	NR	NR	NR	NR	NR	NR	NR	NR	NR	NR	NR	NR	NR

Note: USCHO did not release a poll in week 24.

== Players drafted into the NHL ==
=== 2022 NHL entry draft ===
Round	Pick	Player	NHL team
7	213	David Gucciardi	Washington Capitals
