= Pat Brisson =

Canadian sports agent

- Born: January 22, 1965 (age 61); Salaberry-de-Valleyfield, Quebec, Canada
- Education: University of Ottawa
- Occupation: Sports Agent

Pat Brisson (born January 22, 1965) is a Canadian National Hockey League Players' Association (NHLPA) agent and co-head of the Hockey Division of Creative Artists Agency with partner J.P. Barry. He is also the father of the Toronto Maple Leafs prospect Brendan Brisson. Brisson is known for his influence in the National Hockey League (NHL), particularly for representing high-profile players and negotiating high-value contracts.

== Playing career ==
Brisson enjoyed a successful junior hockey career in the Quebec Major Junior Hockey League (QMJHL), averaging over a point per game with the Verdun Juniors, Drummondville Voltigeurs and Hull Olympiques, where he played for future NHL coach Pat Burns and with NHL great Luc Robitaille. Brisson later played hockey professionally in Europe for the Tilburg Trappers in the Netherlands under coach Lou Vairo, who was also the head coach of the U.S. Olympic hockey team in 1984.

== Early career ==
Brisson moved to Los Angeles in 1987. He co-founded Ice Specialty Entertainment with business partner Robitaille, which played a major role in the creation of the first Iceoplex skating facility. He was an important figure in the development of practice spaces for NHL teams, with locations in both Los Angeles and Pittsburgh, the practice homes for the LA Kings and the Pittsburgh Penguins, respectively. In 1990, he produced the documentary Mario Lemieux: The Magnificent.

== Agent career ==
In 1992, Brisson began his career as a hockey agent, initially working alongside Tom and Steve Reich. In 2001, Brisson joined IMG, where he co-managed alongside JP Barry until 2006. While at IMG he represented players including Sidney Crosby. In 2006, he co-founded CAA Hockey with JP Barry.

Brisson's client roster includes several prominent players such as Hart Memorial Trophy and Art Ross Trophy winners Sidney Crosby, Patrick Kane, Anže Kopitar, and Jonathan Toews. During the 2014 off-season, he negotiated matching eight-year, $84 million contracts for Chicago Blackhawks teammates Kane and Toews, the highest average annual value of any contract at the time since the introduction of the NHL's salary cap in 2005. Additionally, in 2022 Brisson negotiated an eight-year, $100.4 million contract for Nathan MacKinnon which made him the highest-paid player in the league at the time.

Brisson also represented Jack Eichel during his dispute with the Buffalo Sabres over a neck injury, which became one of the most complicated in the NHL's history. Shortly after hiring Brisson, Eichel was traded to the Vegas Golden Knights, where he underwent the artificial disk replacement surgery that had been denied by the Buffalo Sabres, allowing him to return to play.

=== Client roster ===
Over the course of his career, he has represented numerous Hockey Hall of Fame inductees including Mario Lemieux, along with Tom and Steve Reich, Luc Robitaille, Chris Chelios, Sergei Fedorov, Rob Blake, Marty Brodeur, and Roberto Luongo. Since 2005, Brisson has represented nine first-overall selections in the NHL entry draft, including Sidney Crosby (2005), Erik Johnson (2006), Patrick Kane (2007), John Tavares (2009), Nathan MacKinnon (2013), Auston Matthews (2016), Jack Hughes (2019), Owen Power (2021), Macklin Celebrini (2024) and Gavin McKenna (2026). Brisson is the agent for the Hughes brothers - Quinn, Jack, and Luke - who were all top 10 draft picks in their respective drafts.

In the 2021 NHL draft, CAA Hockey, led by Brisson represented 10 of the 31 first round draft picks.

== Awards and recognition ==
In 2021, Brisson was named the 13th most powerful agent in all of sports by Forbes. Brisson was named the 10th most powerful and influential person in hockey and the #1 ranked hockey agent in 2023 by The Hockey News. In 2024, the Vancouver Sun named Brisson as the most productive agent in hockey, and Sports Illustrated described him as "the league's premier agent."

As of 2025, he had negotiated over $1.5 billion in contracts for the players he represents. The Hollywood Reporter did a piece on Brisson titled "A Day in the Life of CAA's Very own Jerry MacGuire", covering his influence in the sports and entertainment industries.

== Hockey career statistics ==
			Regular season					Playoffs
Season	Team	League	GP	G	A	Pts	PIM	GP	G	A	Pts	PIM
1982–83	Verdun Juniors	QMJHL	61	6	24	30	35	7	0	0	0	5
1983–84	Drummondville Voltigeurs	QMJHL	61	24	44	68	70	10	5	3	8	17
1984–85	Drummondville Voltigeurs	QMJHL	64	45	41	86	76	9	1	6	7	14
1985–86	Hull Olympiques	QMJHL	59	37	46	83	73	15	14	18	32	37
