= Michigan–Notre Dame men's ice hockey rivalry =

College sports rivalry

- Michigan Wolverines Notre Dame Fighting Irish
- First meeting: February 4, 1923; Notre Dame 3, Michigan 2 ^{OT}
- Latest meeting: March 11, 2026; Michigan 6, Notre Dame 1
- Next meeting: January 15, 2027

Statistics
- Total meetings: 175
- All-time series: Michigan leads, 98–71–6
- Largest victory: Michigan, 13–2 (1993)
- Longest win streak: Michigan, 18 (1982–1995)
- Longest unbeaten streak: Michigan, 18 (1982–1995)
- Current win streak: Michigan, 5 (2025–present)

Locations of Michigan and Notre Dame

The Michigan–Notre Dame men's ice hockey rivalry is a college ice hockey rivalry between Michigan Wolverines men's ice hockey and Notre Dame Fighting Irish men's ice hockey that is part of the larger rivalry between the University of Michigan and Notre Dame University. The rivalry between the Wolverines and Fighting Irish notably includes the football rivalry.

== History ==
Michigan currently leads the series, which began on February 4, 1923, 93–71–6, as of the end of the 2024–25 season. The regular home arenas for the teams are Yost Ice Arena (capacity 5,800) and Compton Family Ice Arena (capacity 5,022). As of the 2017–18 season, both teams are members of the Big Ten Conference, although they have previously competed together in both the Central Collegiate Hockey Association (CCHA) (1992–2013) and the Western Collegiate Hockey Association (WCHA) (1971–1981). The two schools play at least four times a year through conference play. The teams have met three times in the NCAA Division I men's ice hockey tournament, including twice in the Frozen Four, with Notre Dame winning twice, and Michigan winning once.

== Game results ==
Full game results for the rivalry.

Michigan victories	Notre Dame victories	Tie games

No.	Date	Location	Winner	Score
1	1923	Ann Arbor, MI	Notre Dame	3–2
2	1923	Notre Dame, IN	Notre Dame	5–1
3	1924	Ann Arbor, MI	Michigan	3–1
4	1924	Ann Arbor, MI	Michigan	2–1
5	1971	Ann Arbor, MI	Notre Dame	4–2
6	1971	Ann Arbor, MI	Notre Dame	5–4
7	1971	Ann Arbor, MI	Michigan	6–5^{OT}
8	1971	Ann Arbor, MI	Michigan	6–5
9	1972	Notre Dame, IN	Notre Dame	7–2
10	1972	Notre Dame, IN	Notre Dame	9–4
11	1972	Notre Dame, IN	Notre Dame	5–2
12	1972	Notre Dame, IN	Notre Dame	8–5
13	1973	Ann Arbor, MI	Notre Dame	3–2
14	1973	Ann Arbor, MI	Notre Dame	4–3
15	1973	Ann Arbor, MI	Michigan	6–4
16	1973	Ann Arbor, MI	Notre Dame	2–0
17	1974	Notre Dame, IN	Notre Dame	4–2
18	1974	Notre Dame, IN	Michigan	4–2
19	1974	Notre Dame, IN	Notre Dame	5–4^{OT}
20	1974	Notre Dame, IN	Michigan	5–4^{OT}
21	1975	Ann Arbor, MI	Michigan	7–4
22	1975	Ann Arbor, MI	Notre Dame	7–4
23	1975	Notre Dame, IN	Notre Dame	5–3
24	1975	Notre Dame, IN	Michigan	9–6
25	1976	Ann Arbor, MI	Notre Dame	4–3^{OT}
26	1976	Ann Arbor, MI	Michigan	10–3
27	1976	Ann Arbor, MI	Michigan	8–3
28	1976	Ann Arbor, MI	Notre Dame	5–4
29	1976	Ann Arbor, MI	Michigan	7–6
30	1976	Ann Arbor, MI	Notre Dame	6–5^{OT}

No.	Date	Location	Winner	Score
31	1977	Notre Dame, IN	Notre Dame	4–3^{OT}
32	1977	Notre Dame, IN	Notre Dame	7–3
33	1977	Notre Dame, IN	Michigan	5–3
34	1977	Notre Dame, IN	Michigan	7–5
35	1978	Ann Arbor, MI	Notre Dame	7–4
36	1978	Ann Arbor, MI	Notre Dame	5–1
37	1978	Notre Dame, IN	Notre Dame	7–3
38	1978	Notre Dame, IN	Notre Dame	6–3
39	1979	Ann Arbor, MI	Michigan	6–4
40	1979	Ann Arbor, MI	Notre Dame	10–7
41	1979	Notre Dame, IN	Michigan	7–4
42	1979	Notre Dame, IN	Notre Dame	11–9
43	1980	Ann Arbor, MI	Notre Dame	5–4^{OT}
44	1980	Ann Arbor, MI	Tie	5–5
45	1980	Ann Arbor, MI	Notre Dame	8–3
46	1980	Ann Arbor, MI	Michigan	4–3
47	1980	Notre Dame, IN	Michigan	4–3
48	1980	Notre Dame, IN	Michigan	7–6^{OT}
49	1981	Ann Arbor, MI	Michigan	12–5
50	1981	Ann Arbor, MI	Michigan	8–4
51	1981	Detroit, MI	Notre Dame	6–2
52	1982	Ann Arbor, MI	Notre Dame	9–4
53	1982	Ann Arbor, MI	Tie	2–2
54	1982	Detroit, MI	Notre Dame	6–5
55	1982	Detroit, MI	Notre Dame	5–3
56	1982	Ann Arbor, MI	Notre Dame	9–5
57	1982	Ann Arbor, MI	Michigan	5–4
58	1983	Detroit, MI	Michigan	12–3
59	1989	Notre Dame, IN	Michigan	6–2
60	1989	Ann Arbor, MI	Michigan	5–2

No.	Date	Location	Winner	Score
61	1992	Notre Dame, IN	Michigan	4–3
62	1992	Ann Arbor, MI	Michigan	8–5
63	1992	Ann Arbor, MI	Michigan	6–1
64	1992	Detroit, MI	Michigan	5–1
65	1993	Notre Dame, IN	Michigan	7–1
66	1993	Ann Arbor, MI	Michigan	7–2
67	1993	Ann Arbor, MI	Michigan	13–2
68	1993	Ann Arbor, MI	Michigan	8–1
69	1993	Ann Arbor, MI	Michigan	13–2
70	1993	Detroit, MI	Michigan	8–3
71	1994	Notre Dame, IN	Michigan	6–1
72	1994	Auburn Hills, MI	Michigan	3–1
73	1994	Ann Arbor, MI	Michigan	11–2
74	1995	Auburn Hills, MI	Michigan	9–3
75	1995	Notre Dame, IN	Notre Dame	6–3
76	1996	Ann Arbor, MI	Michigan	11–1
77	1996	Notre Dame, IN	Michigan	4–1
78	1996	Auburn Hills, MI	Michigan	5–2
79	1996	Notre Dame, IN	Michigan	6–3
80	1997	Ann Arbor, MI	Michigan	3–1
81	1997	Ann Arbor, MI	Michigan	6–1
82	1998	Notre Dame, IN	Michigan	7–2
83	1998	Ann Arbor, MI	Michigan	5–4^{OT}
84	1998	Notre Dame, IN	Michigan	1–0
85	1998	Ann Arbor, MI	Notre Dame	4–2
86	1998	Ann Arbor, MI	Michigan	2–1^{OT}
87	1998	Ann Arbor, MI	Michigan	4–3
88	1998	Notre Dame, IN	Tie	2–2
89	1998	Ann Arbor, MI	Michigan	1–0
90	1999	Notre Dame, IN	Notre Dame	3–2

No.	Date	Location	Winner	Score
91	1999	Notre Dame, IN	Michigan	5–3
92	1999	Notre Dame, IN	Michigan	6–1
93	2001	Ann Arbor, MI	No. 7 Michigan	9–0
94	2001	Ann Arbor, MI	Tie	4–4
95	2002	Notre Dame, IN	Tie	3–3
96	2002	Notre Dame, IN	No. 8 Michigan	2–1
97	2002	Ann Arbor, MI	No. 5 Michigan	4–2
98	2002	Ann Arbor, MI	Notre Dame	4–3
99	2004	Notre Dame, IN	Notre Dame	4–1
100	2004	Notre Dame, IN	Notre Dame	5–2
101	2004	Ann Arbor, MI	Michigan	6–1
102	2004	Notre Dame, IN	Michigan	8–0
103	2005	Fort Wayne, IN	Michigan	9–2
104	2005	Ann Arbor, MI	Michigan	6–3
105	2005	Ann Arbor, MI	Michigan	10–1
106	2005	Ann Arbor, MI	Michigan	1–0^{OT}
107	2005	Notre Dame, IN	Michigan	8–5
108	2005	Ann Arbor, MI	Michigan	4–2
109	2006	Ann Arbor, MI	No. 5 Notre Dame	7–3
110	2006	Notre Dame, IN	No. 5 Notre Dame	4–3
111	2007	Detroit, MI	No. 1 Notre Dame	2–1
112	2008	Ann Arbor, MI	No. 1 Michigan	3–2
113	2008	Auburn Hills, MI	No. 1 Michigan	5–1
114	2008	Denver, CO	Notre Dame	5–4^{OT}
115	2009	Notre Dame, IN	No. 7 Michigan	2–1
116	2009	Ann Arbor, MI	No. 1 Notre Dame	3–2
117	2009	Detroit, MI	No. 2 Notre Dame	5–2
118	2009	Ann Arbor, MI	Michigan	4–1
119	2009	Notre Dame, IN	Notre Dame	2–0
120	2010	Ann Arbor, MI	Michigan	4–0

No.	Date	Location	Winner	Score
121	2010	Notre Dame, IN	Notre Dame	5–3
122	2010	Ann Arbor, MI	No. 11 Notre Dame	3–1
123	2010	Ann Arbor, MI	No. 9 Michigan	5–3
124	2011	Detroit, MI	No. 4 Michigan	4–2
125	2012	Notre Dame, IN	No. 6 Notre Dame	3–1
126	2012	Notre Dame, IN	No. 10 Michigan	2–1
127	2012	Ann Arbor, MI	No. 5 Michigan	2–1^{2OT}
128	2012	Ann Arbor, MI	No. 5 Michigan	3–1
129	2012	Ann Arbor, MI	No. 7 Notre Dame	3–1
130	2012	Ann Arbor, MI	No. 7 Notre Dame	4–1
131	2013	Notre Dame, IN	No. 12 Notre Dame	7–4
132	2013	Notre Dame, IN	No. 12 Notre Dame	6–4
133	2013	Detroit, MI	No. 9 Notre Dame	3–1
134	2016	Cincinnati, OH	Michigan	3–2^{OT}
135	2018	Ann Arbor, MI	No. 2 Notre Dame	2–1
136	2018	Notre Dame, IN	No. 2 Notre Dame	2–1
137	2018	Notre Dame, IN	No. 18 Michigan	4–2
138	2018	Ann Arbor, MI	No. 18 Michigan	1–0
139	2018	Saint Paul, MN	No. 2 Notre Dame	4–3
140	2018	Ann Arbor, MI	No. 14 Michigan	2–1
141	2018	Ann Arbor, MI	No. 6 Notre Dame	6–2
142	2019	Notre Dame, IN	Michigan	4–2
143	2019	Notre Dame, IN	No. 15 Notre Dame	5–2
144	2020	Notre Dame, IN	Michigan	3–0
145	2020	Notre Dame, IN	Michigan	3–1
146	2020	Ann Arbor, MI	Notre Dame	2–1
147	2020	Ann Arbor, MI	Notre Dame	3–0
148	2020	Ann Arbor, MI	Notre Dame	3–2
149	2020	Ann Arbor, MI	Notre Dame	2–1
150	2021	Notre Dame, IN	No. 8 Michigan	5–1

No.	Date	Location	Winner	Score
151	2021	Notre Dame, IN	No. 8 Michigan	3–1
152	2021	Ann Arbor, MI	No. 14 Notre Dame	3–2^{OT}
153	2021	Ann Arbor, MI	No. 14 Notre Dame	5–4^{OT}
154	2022	Notre Dame, IN	No. 9 Notre Dame	4–1
155	2022	Notre Dame, IN	No. 9 Notre Dame	2–1
156	2022	Ann Arbor, MI	No. 4 Michigan	2–1
157	2022	Notre Dame, IN	No. 3 Michigan	5–1
158	2022	Notre Dame, IN	No. 18 Notre Dame	3–2^{OT}
159	2023	Ann Arbor, MI	Tie	3–3
160	2023	Ann Arbor, MI	No. 20 Notre Dame	2–1^{OT}
161	2023	Notre Dame, IN	Notre Dame	6–1
162	2023	Notre Dame, IN	No. 13 Michigan	2–1
163	2024	Ann Arbor, MI	No. 17 Michigan	4–0
164	2024	Ann Arbor, MI	No. 17 Michigan	2–1
165	2024	Ann Arbor, MI	No. 14 Michigan	5–4
166	2024	Ann Arbor, MI	No. 14 Michigan	4–3
167	2024	Ann Arbor, MI	No. 7 Michigan	2–1 ^{OT}
168	2024	Ann Arbor, MI	No. 7 Michigan	4–2
169	2025	Notre Dame, IN	No. 9 Michigan	5–3
170	2025	Notre Dame, IN	Notre Dame	7–4
171	2025	Notre Dame, IN	No. 2 Michigan	5–3
172	2025	Notre Dame, IN	No. 2 Michigan	2–1 ^{OT}
173	2026	Ann Arbor, MI	No. 1 Michigan	5–2
174	2026	Ann Arbor, MI	No. 1 Michigan	7–4
175	2026	Ann Arbor, MI	No. 1 Michigan	6–1
Series: Michigan leads 98–71–6
