= Brendan Brisson =

American ice hockey player (born 2001)

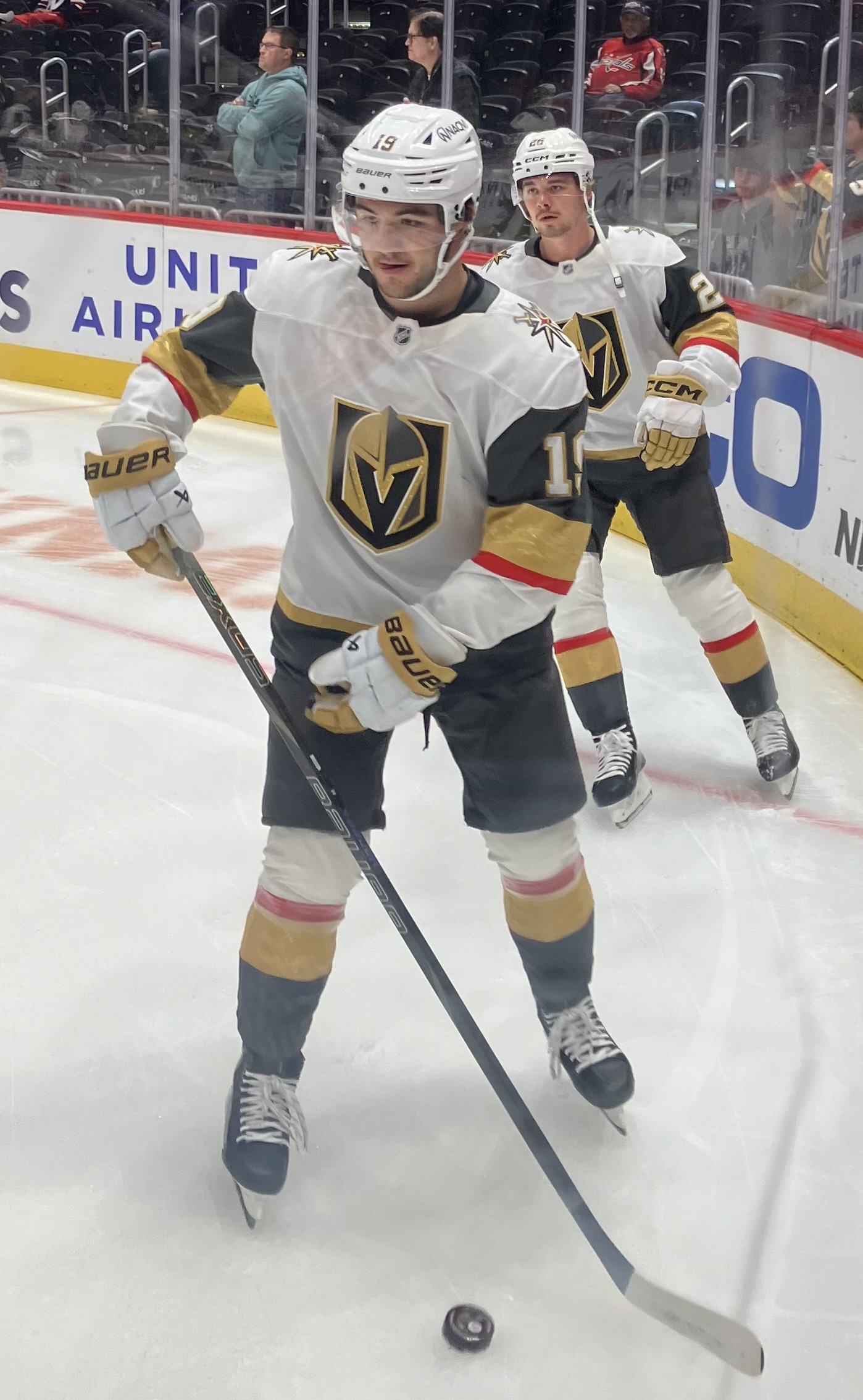
- Brisson (foreground) with the Vegas Golden Knights in 2024
- Born: October 22, 2001 (age 24) Manhattan Beach, California, U.S.
- Height: 6 ft 0 in (183 cm)
- Weight: 188 lb (85 kg; 13 st 6 lb)
- Position: Center
- Shot: Left
- NHL team (P) Cur. team Former teams: Toronto Maple Leafs; Toronto Marlies (AHL); Vegas Golden Knights; New York Rangers
- National team: United States
- NHL draft: 29th overall, 2020; Vegas Golden Knights
- Playing career: 2022–present

Brendan Brisson (born October 22, 2001) is an American professional ice hockey player who is a center for the Toronto Marlies in the American Hockey League (AHL) while under contract to the Toronto Maple Leafs of the National Hockey League (NHL). He was drafted 29th overall by the Vegas Golden Knights in the 2020 NHL entry draft. Brendan is the son of Canadian NHL agent Pat Brisson.

== Early life ==
Brisson played youth hockey for the Los Angeles Jr. Kings and then played Prep hockey for Shattuck-Saint Mary's in Faribault, Minnesota. During his senior year 2018–19 season, he recorded 101 points in 55 games, leading the team in points and goals scored.

== Playing career ==
=== Junior ===
During the 2018–19 season, he played six games for the Green Bay Gamblers of the United States Hockey League (USHL). During the 2019–20 USHL season, Brisson recorded 24 goals and 35 assists in 45 games for the Chicago Steel, ranking second in the league in scoring with 59 points. Following an outstanding season, he was named to the first team All-USHL and USHL All-Rookie Team and named USHL Rookie of the Year.

=== College ===
Brisson began his collegiate career for the University of Michigan during the 2020–21 NCAA Division I season. He recorded ten goals and 11 assists in 24 games for the Wolverines. During the 2021–22 season in his sophomore season, he ranked third on the team in scoring with 35 points on 18 goals and 17 assists, averaging 1.03 points per game. He ranked second in the nation in game-winning goals with six and scored the first goal in a game seven times during the season. Following an outstanding season, he was named to the All-Big Ten Second Team.

=== Professional ===
On April 12, 2022, Brisson signed an amateur tryout contract with the Golden Knights AHL affiliate, the Henderson Silver Knights, for the remainder of the 2021–22 season. He recorded three goals and five assists in six AHL games for the Silver Knights. On April 30, Brisson signed a three-year, entry-level contract with the Vegas Golden Knights.

After recording ten goals and 13 assists in 37 games with the Silver Knights, the Golden Knights recalled Brisson on January 14, 2024. He made his NHL debut the next day against the Nashville Predators. On January 20, Brisson scored his first career goal against the Pittsburgh Penguins, in what was ultimately the game-winning goal of a Vegas third-period comeback.

On March 6, 2025, Brisson was traded by the Golden Knights to the New York Rangers, alongside a 2025 third-round draft pick, in exchange for Reilly Smith.

On September 4, 2026, Brisson was signed to a one-year contract by the Toronto Maple Leafs.

== International play ==
Medal record

Men's ice hockey

Representing United States

World Junior Championship
Gold medal – first place	2021 Canada	

Brisson represented the United States at the 2021 World Junior Championships, where he recorded two goals in seven games and won a gold medal. On January 13, 2022, Brisson was named to United States senior team's roster for the 2022 Winter Olympics.

== Career statistics ==
=== Regular season and playoffs ===
			Regular season					Playoffs
Season	Team	League	GP	G	A	Pts	PIM	GP	G	A	Pts	PIM
2018–19	Green Bay Gamblers	USHL	6	1	0	1	2	—	—	—	—	—
2019–20	Chicago Steel	USHL	45	24	35	59	50	—	—	—	—	—
2020–21	University of Michigan	B1G	24	10	11	21	18	—	—	—	—	—
2021–22	University of Michigan	B1G	38	21	21	42	32	—	—	—	—	—
2021–22	Henderson Silver Knights	AHL	7	3	5	8	4	2	0	0	0	0
2022–23	Henderson Silver Knights	AHL	58	17	20	37	56	—	—	—	—	—
2023–24	Henderson Silver Knights	AHL	52	19	19	38	42	—	—	—	—	—
2023–24	Vegas Golden Knights	NHL	15	2	6	8	2	—	—	—	—	—
2024–25	Henderson Silver Knights	AHL	45	5	14	19	34	—	—	—	—	—
2024–25	Vegas Golden Knights	NHL	9	0	0	0	0	—	—	—	—	—
2024–25	Hartford Wolf Pack	AHL	16	2	4	6	12	—	—	—	—	—
2025–26	Hartford Wolf Pack	AHL	66	19	18	37	63	—	—	—	—	—
2025–26	New York Rangers	NHL	3	0	1	1	0	—	—	—	—	—
NHL totals			27	2	7	9	2	—	—	—	—	—

=== International ===
Year	Team	Event	Result	GP	G	A	Pts	PIM
2021	United States	WJC	1st place, gold medalist(s)	7	2	0	2	0
2022	United States	OG	5th	4	2	0	2	2
Junior totals				7	2	0	2	0
Senior totals				4	2	0	2	2

== Awards and honors ==
Award	Year	Ref
College
All-Big Ten Second Team	2022	
Big Ten All-Tournament Team	2022	

Awards and achievements
Preceded by Peyton Krebs	Vegas Golden Knights first-round draft pick 2020	Succeeded by Zach Dean
