= Nick Blankenburg =

American ice hockey player (born 1998)

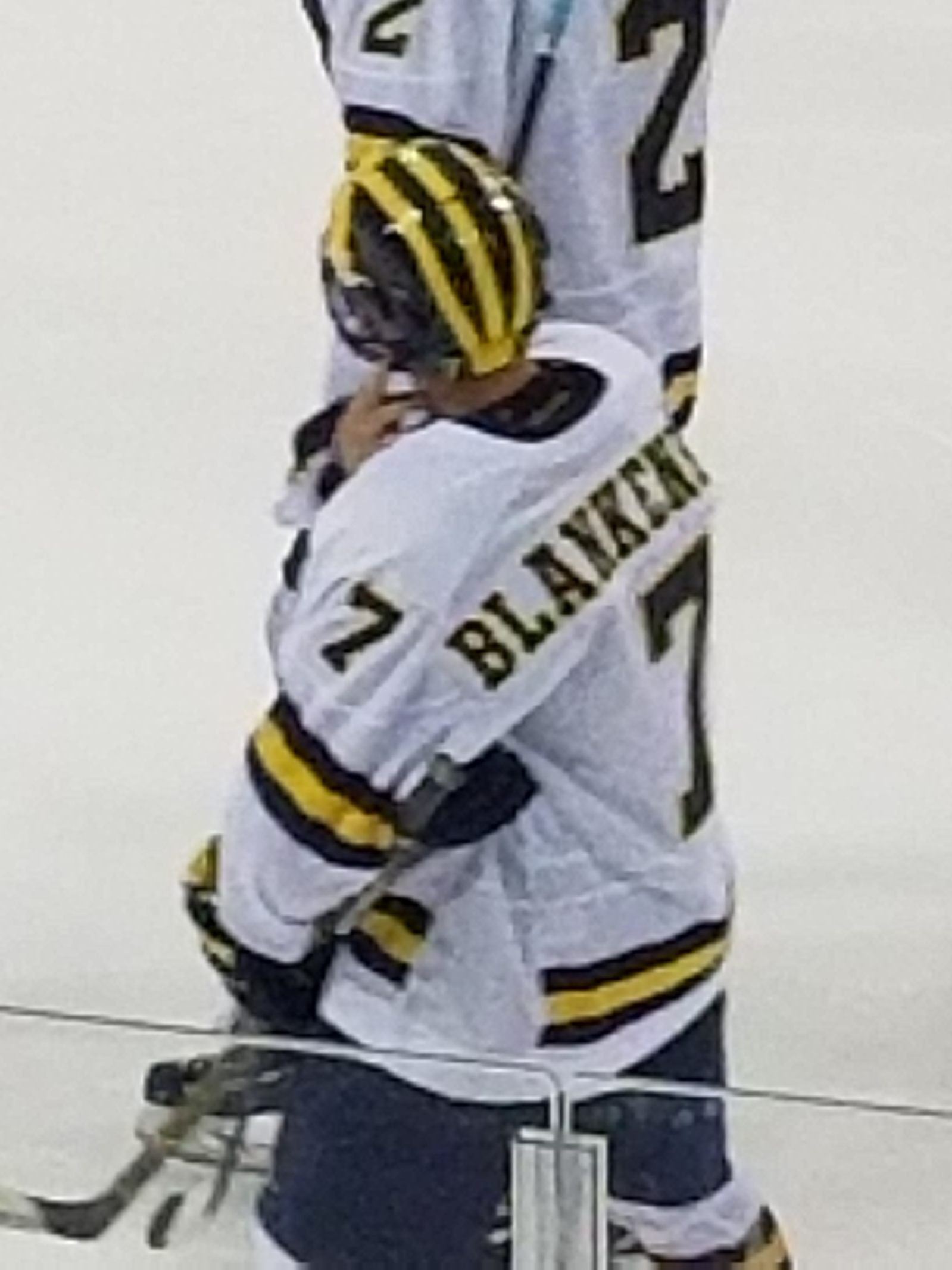
- Blankenburg with the Michigan Wolverines in 2018
- Born: May 12, 1998 (age 28) Washington, Michigan, U.S.
- Height: 5 ft 9 in (175 cm)
- Weight: 177 lb (80 kg; 12 st 9 lb)
- Position: Defense
- Shoots: Right
- NHL team Former teams: Toronto Maple Leafs; Columbus Blue Jackets; Nashville Predators; Colorado Avalanche
- National team: United States
- NHL draft: Undrafted
- Playing career: 2022–present

Nick Blankenburg (born May 12, 1998) is an American professional ice hockey player who is a defenseman for the Toronto Maple Leafs of the National Hockey League (NHL). He previously played for the Columbus Blue Jackets, Nashville Predators and Colorado Avalanche. He played college ice hockey at Michigan.

== Early life ==
Blankenburg grew up in Washington, Michigan, where he attended Romeo High School. During his senior year he was team captain and recorded 35 goals and 32 assists in 30 games, and helped lead the Bulldogs to their first state championship in school history in 2016.

== Playing career ==
=== Junior ===
After graduating from Romeo in 2016, Blankenburg tried out twice for the North American Hockey League, but had no success. With a year left of eligibility for AAA hockey, he tried out for and made the Victory Honda 18U team in Plymouth, Michigan. During the 2016–17 season, he switched from forward to defense to fill a needed position on the team; a position he's stuck with ever since. He recorded ten goals and 18 assists in 32 games with Victory Honda.

From there, he was scouted by the Okotoks Oilers of the Alberta Junior Hockey League. For the 2017–18 season, Blankenburg played defense for the Okotoks Oilers, and recorded 16 goals and 26 assists in 57 games. While playing for Okotoks, Blankenburg caught the attention of scouts from his home school, University of Michigan, and received an offer to play college hockey.

=== Collegiate ===
Blankenburg began his collegiate career as a walk-on for the University of Michigan during the 2018–19 season. He scored his first collegiate goal on November 10, 2018, in a game against Notre Dame. He finished his freshman year with two goals and eight assists in 34 games. During the 2019–20 season in his sophomore year, he recorded four goals and 12 assists in 35 games. Following the season he was named Honorable Mention All-Big Ten. On July 10, 2020, Blankenburg was named an alternate captain for the 2020–21 season. During his junior year, he recorded five goals and eight assists in 26 games. He ranked sixth in the Big Ten Conference in defenseman scoring with 13 points, and ranked third in the Big Ten, and tenth nationally, in plus–minus at +19. Following the season he was named Honorable Mention All-Big Ten.

On September 16, 2021, he was named team captain for the 2021–22 season. After being a walk-on for his first three years, Blankenburg was also awarded a scholarship for the 2021–22 season. During his senior year, he recorded a career-high 14 goals and 15 assists in 38 games. On November 26, he scored a goal and an assist in a 4–0 win over Niagara. The next day against Niagara he recorded two goals and an assist in a 4–1 win, for his second consecutive multi-point game. He was subsequently named the Big Ten First Star of the Week for the week ending November 30, after recording five points during the weekend series. His 14 goals tied the Michigan program record for goals in a single season by a senior defenseman. He ranked second among all NCAA defensemen in goals and power play goals. Following the season he was named Honorable Mention All-Big Ten, and a finalist for the Senior CLASS Award. He also was awarded Michigan's Big Ten Medal of Honor. He finished his career at Michigan with 25 goals, 44 assists, a +52 with 10 power-play goals and three game-winning goals in 133 games.

=== Professional ===
On April 8, 2022, Blankenburg signed a one-year, entry-level contract with the Columbus Blue Jackets for the remainder of the 2021–22 NHL season. He made his NHL debut for the Blue Jackets on April 13, 2022. On April 24, in his sixth game, Blankenburg's first career NHL goal was the game-winning power play marker in a 5–2 victory against the Edmonton Oilers. On July 15, 2022, Blankenburg signed a two-year, $1.65 million extension with the Blue Jackets. During the 2023–24 season he recorded one goal in 12 games for the Blue Jackets. He also appeared in 24 games for the Blue Jackets' AHL affiliate, the Cleveland Monsters where he recorded three goals and ten assists.

On July 1, 2024, Blankenburg signed a two-year contract with the Nashville Predators. Blankenburg began the 2024–25 season with the Predators' AHL affiliate, the Milwaukee Admirals. On November 27, 2024, he was recalled by the Predators and made his team debut later that night. Before being recalled, he recorded three goals and five assists in 13 games for the Admirals.

On March 4, 2026, Blankenburg was traded to the Colorado Avalanche in exchange for a fifth-round pick in the 2027 NHL entry draft. Before being traded, he recorded six goals and 15 assists in 49 games for the Predators. His goals and points ranked second among Nashville defensemen at the time of the trade. He scored his first points with the Avalanche during an April 6 game against the St. Louis Blues, assisting on a goal by Brent Burns during the second period. He scored his first goal with the Avalanche on April 11 during a game against the Vegas Golden Knights when his shot from the blue line hit the goal post, bounced off goalie Carter Hart, and trickled in.

During the 2026 Stanley Cup playoffs, he scored his first career playoff goal during Game 1 of the Avalanche's second round series against the Minnesota Wild.

As a free agent from the Avalanche, Blankenburg went un-signed over the summer before attending the Toronto Maple Leafs' training camp on a professional try-out basis. On September 28, 2026, Blankenburg secured a one-year, $1.4 million contract with the Maple Leafs for the 2026–27 season.

== International play ==
On May 5, 2022, Blankenburg was named to the United States men's national ice hockey team to compete at the 2022 IIHF World Championship. He was scoreless in four games.

== Personal life ==
Blankenburg's older brother, Alex, played college ice hockey for Omaha from 2015–19. Blankenburg is a passionate Christian and regularly attends Church.

== Career statistics ==
=== Regular season and playoffs ===
			Regular season					Playoffs
Season	Team	League	GP	G	A	Pts	PIM	GP	G	A	Pts	PIM
2017–18	Okotoks Oilers	AJHL	57	16	26	42	65	6	4	2	6	2
2018–19	University of Michigan	B1G	34	2	8	10	12	—	—	—	—	—
2019–20	University of Michigan	B1G	34	4	12	16	14	—	—	—	—	—
2020–21	University of Michigan	B1G	26	5	8	13	14	—	—	—	—	—
2021–22	University of Michigan	B1G	38	14	15	29	22	—	—	—	—	—
2021–22	Columbus Blue Jackets	NHL	7	1	2	3	4	—	—	—	—	—
2022–23	Columbus Blue Jackets	NHL	36	4	10	14	16	—	—	—	—	—
2023–24	Cleveland Monsters	AHL	24	3	10	13	22	1	0	0	0	0
2023–24	Columbus Blue Jackets	NHL	12	1	0	1	4	—	—	—	—	—
2024–25	Milwaukee Admirals	AHL	13	3	5	8	2	—	—	—	—	—
2024–25	Nashville Predators	NHL	60	4	12	16	24	—	—	—	—	—
2025–26	Nashville Predators	NHL	49	6	15	21	10	—	—	—	—	—
2025–26	Colorado Avalanche	NHL	12	2	1	3	0	5	1	0	1	2
NHL totals			176	18	40	58	58	5	1	0	1	2

=== International ===
Year	Team	Event	Result	GP	G	A	Pts	PIM
2022	United States	WC	4th	4	0	0	0	0
Senior totals				4	0	0	0	0
