= 2021–22 Providence Friars men's ice hockey season =

Ice hockey season in New England, US

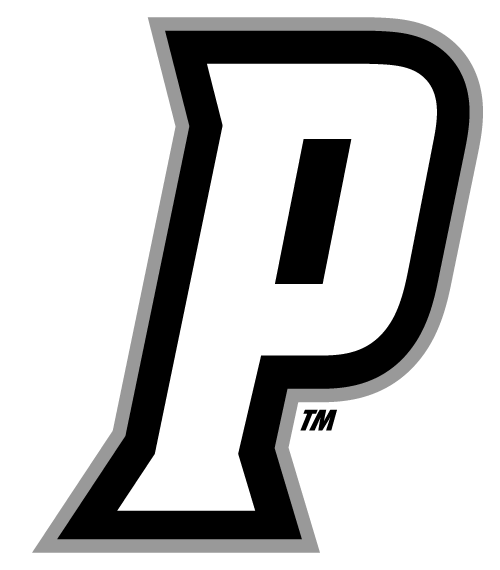
- Conference: 7th Hockey East
- Home ice: Schneider Arena

Rankings
- USCHO: #20
- USA Today: NR

Record
- Overall: 22–14–2
- Conference: 12–11–1
- Home: 14–4–2
- Road: 7–9–0
- Neutral: 1–1–1

Coaches and captains
- Head coach: Nate Leaman
- Assistant coaches: Ron Rolston; Joel Beal; Bruce Irving
- Captain: Michael Callahan
- Alternate captain(s): Max Crozier; Parker Ford; Kohen Olischefski

The 2021–22 Providence Friars Men's ice hockey season is the 71st season of play for the program. They represent Providence College in the 2021–22 NCAA Division I men's ice hockey season and for the 38th season in the Hockey East conference. They are coached by Nate Leaman, in his 11th season, and play their home games at Schneider Arena.

== Season ==
Providence began the season well, winning its first three games and headed into the Ice Breaker Tournament ranked in the top 10. Unfortunately, when the Friars faced other highly ranked opponents, they weren't able to sustain the same level of success. They finished last in the tournament but recovered a week later with a win over Denver. They regained their spot in the top-10 and held it until early November when they were swept by defending national champion Massachusetts. The two losses were very harmful to Providence since their record left them with little opportunity for improvement over the next month. The Friars did win the succeeding six games, however, because all of them were to unranked teams (some of whom had terrible records) they actually fell in the rankings, dropping down to 13th by the beginning of December.

The team finally got a chance to climb back into postseason contention when they met Northeastern. Unfortunately, just as they had against the Minutemen, Providence dropped both games to the Huskies and fell further down the standings. The Friars performed well in their four other games during the month but none were against ranked teams.

COVID-19 ended up causing Providence to cancel a few games at the beginning of January and the team looked out of sorts afterwards. Providence played inconsistently over the second half of the year. While the team did record impressive wins against upper-echelon clubs, the bright spots couldn't cover up the fact that, in a down year for Hockey East, the Friars finished in the bottom half of the standings.

Providence entered postseason play with only a slim chance for an at-large bid. The Friars would likely need to make the conference championship game to have any hope at making the tournament but even that would not be a guarantee. They dominated Vermont in the opening match, outshooting the Catamounts 40–18, but only scraped by with a 2–1 victory. The lack of scoring continued in the quarterfinals when they took on Massachusetts. They continued to send a barrage of shots on goal, firing 47 in total, but again could only manage 2 goals. The Minutemen, however, had no trouble getting the puck past Jaxson Stauber and notched 4 on only 19 shots and ended the Friars' season.

== Departures ==
Player	Position	Nationality	Cause
Jack Adams	Forward	United States	Graduate transfer to Notre Dame
Anton Martinsson	Goaltender	Sweden	Graduation (retired)
John McDermott	Forward	United States	Graduation (retired)
Gabriel Mollot-Hill	Goaltender	Canada	Graduate transfer to Guelph
Albin Nilsson	Forward	Sweden	Transferred to Niagara
Jason O'Neill	Forward	United States	Graduation (retired)
Greg Printz	Forward	United States	Graduation (signed with San Diego Gulls)
Tyce Thompson	Forward	United States	Signed professional contract (New Jersey Devils)
Matt Tugnutt	Forward	Canada	Graduation (signed with Idaho Steelheads)

== Recruiting ==
Player	Position	Nationality	Age	Notes
Austin Cain	Goaltender	Canada	25	Ottawa, ON; graduate transfer from Western Michigan
Michael Citara	Forward	United States	19	New Hope, PA
Riley Duran	Forward	United States	19	Boston, MA; selected 182nd overall in 2020
Alex Esposito	Forward	United States	25	West Haven, CT; graduate transfer from Vermont
Tomas Mazura	Forward	Czech Republic	21	Pardubice, CZE; selected 162nd overall in 2019
Cody Monds	Forward	Canada	20	Brockville, ON
Kohen Olischefski	Forward	Canada	23	Abbotsford, BC; graduate transfer from Denver
Guillaume Richard	Defenseman	Canada	18	Quebec City, QC; selected 101st overall in 2021
Will Schimek	Defenseman	United States	20	Mendota Heights, MN

== Roster ==
As of August 12, 2021.

No.	Nat.	Player	Class	Pos	Height	Weight	DoB	Hometown	Previous team	NHL rights
1	(United States)	Jimmy Scannell	Senior	G	5' 11" (1.8 m)	170 lb (77 kg)	1999-06-13	Medfield, Massachusetts	Thayer Academy (USHS–MA)	—
2	(United States)	Luke Johnson	Junior	D	5' 11" (1.8 m)	175 lb (79 kg)	1999-01-07	Edina, Minnesota	Sioux City Musketeers (USHL)	—
3	(United States)	Davis Bunz	Graduate	D	6' 1" (1.85 m)	180 lb (82 kg)	1998-09-04	Middleton, Wisconsin	Central Illinois Flying Aces (USHL)	—
4	(Canada)	Guillaume Richard	Freshman	D	6' 2" (1.88 m)	175 lb (79 kg)	2003-02-10	Quebec City, Quebec	Tri-City Storm (USHL)	CBJ, 101st overall 2021
5	(United States)	Ben Mirageas	Graduate	D	6' 1" (1.85 m)	185 lb (84 kg)	1999-05-08	Newburyport, Massachusetts	Chicago Steel (USHL)	NYI, 77th overall 2017
6	(United States)	Cam McDonald	Junior	D	5' 9" (1.75 m)	180 lb (82 kg)	2001-02-03	Eagle River, Alaska	Muskegon Lumberjacks (USHL)	—
8	(United States)	Riley Duran	Freshman	F	6' 3" (1.91 m)	185 lb (84 kg)	2002-01-25	Woburn, Massachusetts	Youngstown Phantoms (USHL)	BOS, 182nd overall 2020
9	(United States)	Patrick Moynihan	Junior	F	5' 11" (1.8 m)	190 lb (86 kg)	2001-01-23	Millis, Massachusetts	USNTDP (USHL)	NJD, 158th overall 2019
10	(Canada)	Kohen Olischefski (A)	Graduate	F	6' 1" (1.85 m)	187 lb (85 kg)	1998-02-01	Abbotsford, British Columbia	Denver (NCHC)	—
11	(United States)	Michael Citara	Freshman	F	5' 11" (1.8 m)	165 lb (75 kg)	2002-04-22	New Hope, Pennsylvania	Sioux Falls Stampede (USHL)	—
12	(Canada)	Nick Poisson	Sophomore	F	5' 11" (1.8 m)	190 lb (86 kg)	2001-08-15	Vancouver, British Columbia	Prince George Spruce Kings (BCHL)	—
13	(United States)	Craig Needham	Junior	F	5' 10" (1.78 m)	185 lb (84 kg)	1999-03-31	Medford, Massachusetts	Youngstown Phantoms (USHL)	—
14	(United States)	Matt Koopman	Senior	F	5' 10" (1.78 m)	175 lb (79 kg)	1998-05-01	Marblehead, Massachusetts	Waterloo Black Hawks (USHL)	—
15	(Czech Republic)	Tomáš Mazura	Freshman	F	6' 4" (1.93 m)	194 lb (88 kg)	2000-09-23	Sezemice, Czech Republic	HIFK U20 (Nuorten SM-liiga)	EDM, 162nd overall 2019
16	(United States)	Kyle Koopman	Senior	D	5' 11" (1.8 m)	190 lb (86 kg)	1998-05-01	Marblehead, Massachusetts	West Kelowna Warriors (BCHL)	—
17	(United States)	Chase Yoder	Sophomore	F	5' 11" (1.8 m)	180 lb (82 kg)	2002-05-28	Fairview, Texas	USNTDP (USHL)	PIT, 170th overall 2020
18	(Canada)	Jamie Engelbert	Junior	F	6' 4" (1.93 m)	205 lb (93 kg)	2000-06-21	Cobourg, Ontario	Cobourg Cougars (OJHL)	—
19	(Canada)	Cody Monds	Freshman	F	5' 10" (1.78 m)	170 lb (77 kg)	2001-02-09	Brockville, Ontario	Fargo Force (USHL)	—
20	(United States)	Parker Ford (A)	Junior	F	5' 9" (1.75 m)	185 lb (84 kg)	2000-07-20	Wakefield, Rhode Island	Sioux City Musketeers (USHL)	—
21	(United States)	Brett Berard	Sophomore	F	5' 9" (1.75 m)	165 lb (75 kg)	2002-09-09	East Greenwich, Rhode Island	USNTDP (USHL)	NYR, 134th overall 2020
22	(Finland)	Uula Ruikka	Sophomore	D	5' 9" (1.75 m)	175 lb (79 kg)	2000-05-28	Oulu, Finland	Chicago Steel (USHL)	—
23	(United States)	Michael Callahan (C)	Senior	D	6' 2" (1.88 m)	205 lb (93 kg)	1999-09-23	Franklin, Massachusetts	Youngstown Phantoms (USHL)	ARI, 142nd overall 2018
24	(Canada)	Max Crozier (A)	Junior	D	6' 2" (1.88 m)	195 lb (88 kg)	2000-04-19	Calgary, Alberta	Sioux Falls Stampede (USHL)	TBL, 120th overall 2019
25	(United States)	Luke Perunovich	Senior	D	6' 0" (1.83 m)	180 lb (82 kg)	1997-05-12	Edina, Minnesota	Northeast Generals (NAHL)	—
26	(United States)	Alex Esposito	Graduate	F	6' 0" (1.83 m)	185 lb (84 kg)	1996-06-03	West Haven, Connecticut	Vermont (HEA)	—
28	(United States)	Garrett Devine	Junior	F	6' 1" (1.85 m)	185 lb (84 kg)	1997-11-25	Windsor, Colorado	South Shore Kings (NCDC)	—
29	(United States)	Will Schimek	Freshman	D	6' 2" (1.88 m)	205 lb (93 kg)	2001-05-22	Mendota Heights, Minnesota	Sioux Falls Stampede (USHL)	—
30	(United States)	Jaxson Stauber	Junior	G	6' 3" (1.91 m)	175 lb (79 kg)	1999-04-27	Plymouth, Minnesota	Sioux Falls Stampede (USHL)	—
33	(Canada)	Austin Cain	Graduate	G	6' 4" (1.93 m)	187 lb (85 kg)	1996-09-12	Kanata, Ontario	Western Michigan (WCHA)	—

== Standings ==
2021–22 Hockey East Standings
	Conference record										Overall record					
	GP	W	L	T	OTW	OTL	SOW	PTS	GF	GA	GP	W	L	T	GF	GA
#12 Northeastern †	24	15	8	1	1	1	1	47	68	46	39	25	13	1	99	68
#10 Massachusetts *	24	14	8	2	2	3	1	46	77	54	37	22	13	2	117	88
#13 Massachusetts Lowell	24	15	8	1	1	0	1	46	62	48	35	21	11	3	102	74
#19 Connecticut	24	14	10	0	2	1	0	41	73	61	36	20	16	0	109	89
Boston University	24	13	8	3	3	2	0	41	69	58	35	19	13	3	107	89
Merrimack	24	13	11	0	1	3	0	41	70	70	35	19	15	1	109	99
#20 Providence	24	12	11	1	1	1	1	38	61	52	38	22	14	2	118	82
Boston College	24	9	12	3	0	1	1	32	67	77	38	15	18	5	114	123
New Hampshire	24	8	15	1	2	2	0	25	47	71	34	14	19	1	76	95
Vermont	24	6	16	2	3	1	2	20	41	72	35	8	25	2	59	101
Maine	24	5	17	2	2	3	1	19	54	80	33	7	22	4	74	111
Championship: March 19, 2022 † indicates regular season champion * indicates conference tournament champion (Lamoriello Trophy); Rankings: USCHO.com Top 20 Poll

== Schedule and results ==
Date	Time	Opponent^{#}	Rank^{#}	Site	TV	Decision	Result	Attendance	Record
Regular season
October 2	4:00 PM	Army*	#12	Schneider Arena • Providence, Rhode Island		Stauber	W 7–0	0	1–0–0
October 7	7:00 PM	Merrimack	#11	Schneider Arena • Providence, Rhode Island	NESN	Stauber	W 5–2	2,587	2–0–0 (1–0–0)
October 9	7:05 PM	at American International*	#11	MassMutual Center • Springfield, Massachusetts		Stauber	W 5–1	577	3–0–0
Ice Breaker Tournament
October 15	5:07 PM	vs. #1 Minnesota State*	#10	AMSOIL Arena • Duluth, Minnesota (Ice Breaker Semifinal)		Stauber	L 2–5	— (Note: Spectators were in attendance, but the exact number was not reported.)	3–1–0
October 16	8:37 PM	at #5 Minnesota Duluth*	#10	AMSOIL Arena • Duluth, Minnesota (Ice Breaker Consolation)		Stauber	L 2–3	5,738	3–2–0
Regular season
October 22	7:00 PM	#8 Denver*	#12	Schneider Arena • Providence, Rhode Island		Stauber	W 6–5	2,637	4–2–0
October 24	5:00 PM	at New Hampshire	#12	Whittemore Center • Durham, New Hampshire		Stauber	W 2–0	3,458	5–2–0 (2–0–0)
October 29	7:00 PM	New Hampshire	#8	Schneider Arena • Providence, Rhode Island	NESN+	Stauber	W 6–1	2,227	6–2–0 (3–0–0)
October 30	7:00 PM	at New Hampshire	#8	Whittemore Center • Durham, New Hampshire		Stauber	L 1–2	3,134	6–3–0 (3–1–0)
November 5	7:00 PM	at #12 Massachusetts	#7	Mullins Center • Amherst, Massachusetts	NESN	Stauber	L 0–1	4,485	6–4–0 (3–2–0)
November 6	7:00 PM	#12 Massachusetts	#7	Schneider Arena • Providence, Rhode Island	NESN+	Stauber	L 1–5	3,169	6–5–0 (3–3–0)
November 12	7:00 PM	American International*	#12	Schneider Arena • Providence, Rhode Island		Stauber	W 2–1 ^{OT}	1,753	7–5–0
November 13	7:00 PM	Connecticut	#12	Schneider Arena • Providence, Rhode Island		Stauber	W 6–4	2,572	8–5–0 (4–3–0)
November 19	7:35 PM	at Vermont	#12	Gutterson Fieldhouse • Burlington, Vermont		Stauber	W 4–3	2,421	9–5–0 (5–3–0)
November 20	7:05 PM	at Vermont	#12	Gutterson Fieldhouse • Burlington, Vermont		Stauber	W 2–0	2,298	10–5–0 (6–3–0)
November 26	4:00 PM	Dartmouth*	#14	Schneider Arena • Providence, Rhode Island	NESN	Stauber	W 7–4	1,969	11–5–0
November 27	7:00 PM	at Brown*	#14	Meehan Auditorium • Providence, Rhode Island (Mayor's Cup)	NESN+	Cain	W 4–0	842	12–5–0
December 3	7:00 PM	#16 Northeastern	#13	Schneider Arena • Providence, Rhode Island		Stauber	L 0–2	2,762	12–6–0 (6–4–0)
December 4	7:00 PM	at #16 Northeastern	#13	Matthews Arena • Boston, Massachusetts	NESN+	Stauber	L 1–4	2,638	12–7–0 (6–5–0)
December 10	7:00 PM	Princeton*	#16	Schneider Arena • Providence, Rhode Island	NESN+	Stauber	W 7–0	2,129	13–7–0
December 11	7:00 PM	Princeton*	#16	Schneider Arena • Providence, Rhode Island		Stauber	W 3–2	1,920	14–7–0
Holiday Face–Off
December 28	5:07 PM	vs. Bowling Green*	#16	Fiserv Forum • Milwaukee, Wisconsin (Face–Off Semifinal)	BSD, BSN, BSO, BSW	Stauber	W 6–2	-	15–7–0
December 29	8:37 PM	vs. Wisconsin*	#16	Fiserv Forum • Milwaukee, Wisconsin (Face–Off Championship)	BSN, BSO, BSW	Stauber	T 2–2 ^{SOL}	6,225	15–7–1
Regular season
January 14	7:00 PM	at Merrimack	#17	J. Thom Lawler Rink • North Andover, Massachusetts		Stauber	L 2–3	1,587	15–8–1 (6–6–0)
January 15	5:30 PM	Merrimack	#17	Schneider Arena • Providence, Rhode Island		Stauber	L 1–2	2,128	15–9–1 (6–7–0)
January 21	7:00 PM	Boston College	#18	Schneider Arena • Providence, Rhode Island		Stauber	W 7–0	5,390	16–9–1 (7–7–0)
January 22	7:00 PM	at Boston College	#18	Conte Forum • Chestnut Hill, Massachusetts	NESN	Stauber	T 1–1 ^{SOW}	3,187	16–9–2 (7–7–1)
January 28	7:00 PM	at #9 Massachusetts	#17	Mullins Center • Amherst, Massachusetts	NESN+	Stauber	W 2–1	4,493	17–9–2 (8–7–1)
January 30	3:00 PM	at Boston University	#17	Agganis Arena • Boston, Massachusetts	NESN	Stauber	L 2–5	2,228	17–10–2 (8–8–1)
February 4	7:05 PM	at Connecticut	#17	XL Center • Hartford, Connecticut	NESN+	Stauber	L 1–2	3,647	17–11–2 (8–9–1)
February 5	7:00 PM	Vermont	#17	Schneider Arena • Providence, Rhode Island	NESN	Stauber	W 4–1	2,834	18–11–2 (9–9–1)
February 11	7:00 PM	#20 Boston University	#17	Schneider Arena • Providence, Rhode Island	NESN+	Stauber	L 1–4	2,394	18–12–2 (9–10–1)
February 18	7:15 PM	at #16 Massachusetts Lowell	#19	Tsongas Center • Lowell, Massachusetts		Stauber	L 2–3	4,243	18–13–2 (9–11–1)
February 19	7:00 PM	#16 Massachusetts Lowell	#19	Schneider Arena • Providence, Rhode Island		Stauber	W 3–2	2,453	19–13–2 (10–11–1)
February 25	7:00 PM	Maine	#19т	Schneider Arena • Providence, Rhode Island		Stauber	W 4–2	1,996	20–13–2 (11–11–1)
February 26	7:00 PM	Maine	#19т	Schneider Arena • Providence, Rhode Island		Stauber	W 3–2 ^{OT}	2,042	21–13–2 (12–11–1)
March 4	7:00 PM	USNTDP*	#19	Schneider Arena • Providence, Rhode Island (Exhibition)		Cain	L 4–5		
Hockey East Tournament
March 9	7:00 PM	Vermont*	#20	Schneider Arena • Providence, Rhode Island (Opening Round)		Stauber	W 2–1	1,095	22–13–2
March 12	7:00 PM	at #12 Massachusetts*	#20	Mullins Center • Amherst, Massachusetts (Quarterfinals)		Stauber	L 2–4	2,422	22–14–2
*Non-conference game. ^{#}Rankings from USCHO.com Poll. All times are in Eastern Time. Source:

== Scoring statistics ==
Name	Position	Games	Goals	Assists	Points	PIM
Brett Berard	LW	36	18	20	38	37
Nick Poisson	F	37	10	25	35	22
Parker Ford	C/RW	38	13	14	27	31
Patrick Moynihan	C	38	11	14	25	24
Max Crozier	D	32	7	16	23	16
Riley Duran	C	38	10	9	19	18
Kohen Olischefski	RW	38	8	10	18	0
Jamie Engelbert	C	38	7	11	18	14
Cody Monds	RW	32	5	10	15	8
Guillaume Richard	D	36	3	11	14	26
Michael Callahan	D	38	3	11	14	16
Matt Koopman	C	35	5	7	12	2
Chase Yoder	F	38	5	6	11	14
Uula Ruikka	D	32	0	8	8	12
Cam McDonald	D	38	3	4	7	20
Jaxson Stauber	G	37	0	5	5	0
Davis Bunz	D	38	0	5	5	20
Ben Mirageas	D	16	3	1	4	21
Michael Citara	RW	28	3	1	4	6
Alex Esposito	RW	23	1	3	4	6
Craig Needham	C	30	1	3	4	6
Tomas Mazura	C	8	1	1	2	2
Garrett Devine	F	7	1	0	1	2
Taige Harding	D	15	0	1	1	6
Jimmy Scannell	G	2	0	0	0	0
Luke Perunovich	D	2	0	0	0	2
Luke Johnson	D	3	0	0	0	0
Austin Cain	G	4	0	0	0	0
William Schimek	D	8	0	0	0	8
Total			118	197	315	339

== Goaltending statistics ==
Name	Games	Minutes	Wins	Losses	Ties	Goals against	Saves	Shut outs	SV %	GAA
Austin Cain	4	75	1	0	0	0	31	1	1.000	0.00
Jimmy Scannell	2	3:09	0	0	0	0	1	0	1.000	0.00
Jaxson Stauber	23	2203	21	14	2	77	898	4	.921	2.10
Empty Net	-	17	-	-	-	5	-	-	-	-
Total	38	2299	22	14	2	82	930	5	.919	2.14

== Rankings ==
Poll	Week																									
Poll	Pre	1	2	3	4	5	6	7	8	9	10	11	12	13	14	15	16	17	18	19	20	21	22	23	24	25 (Final)
USCHO.com	12	11	10	12	8	7	12	12	14	13	16	16	16	17	18	17	17	17	19	19	19	20	20	20	-	20
USA Today	14	11	10	14	8	8	13	11	14	13	NR	NR	NR	NR	NR	NR	NR	NR	NR	NR	NR	NR	NR	NR	NR	NR

Note: USCHO did not release a poll in week 24.

== Awards and honors ==
Player	Award	Ref
Max Crozier	Hockey East Third Team	
Brett Berard	Hockey East Third Team	

== Players drafted into the NHL ==
=== 2022 NHL entry draft ===
Round	Pick	Player	NHL team
6	193	Chris Romaine^{†}	Colorado Avalanche

† incoming freshman
