= Holiday Face–Off =

Collegiate ice hockey tournament

- Sport: College ice hockey
- Founded: 2021
- No. of teams: 4
- Venue: Fiserv Forum (2021–present)
- Most recent champion: Western Michigan
- Most titles: Wisconsin (3)

The Holiday Face–Off (also known as the Kwik Trip Holiday Face–Off for sponsorship reasons) is a mid-season college ice hockey tournament held annually at Fiserv Forum in Milwaukee, Wisconsin. The first iteration played in December 2021.

== History ==
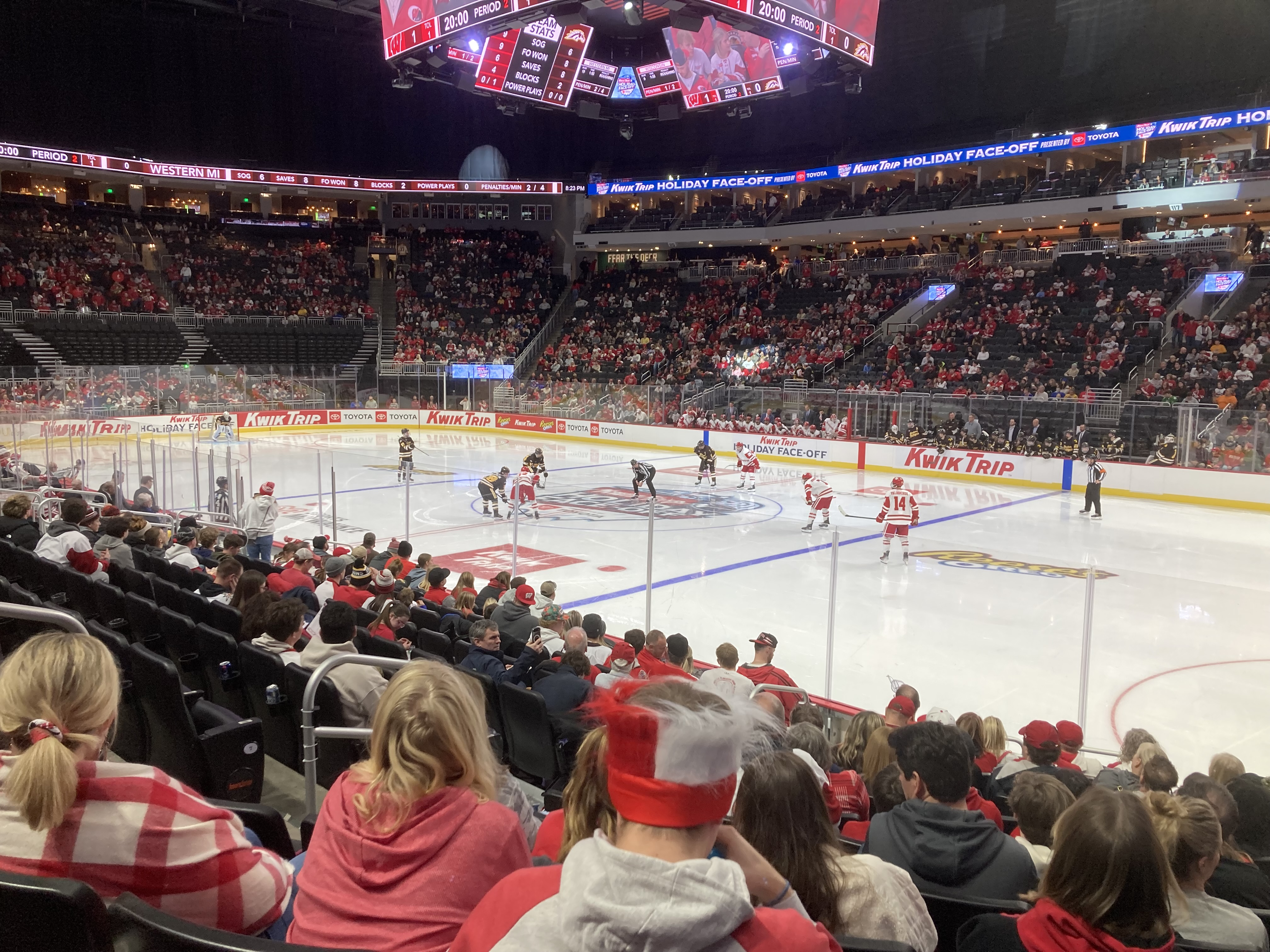
2025 Holiday Face–Off championship game, Wisconsin vs. Western Michigan

The Holiday Face–Off was brought about by the Gazelle Group, a marketing firm based in Princeton, New Jersey. The group sought to rekindle a mid-western holiday tournament that had previously been organized by the University of Wisconsin–Madison as the Badger Showdown. No winter tournament had been held in the region since the Showdown was discontinued in 2009.

The tournament was first supposed to be held on December 28–29, 2020. However, it was postponed to 2021 due to the COVID-19 outbreak. The original teams meant to play were the Wisconsin Badgers, Clarkson Golden Knights, UConn Huskies, and Arizona State Sun Devils.

On June 15, 2021, it was announced that the inaugural Holiday Face–Off tournament would be played on December 28–29, 2021 between the Wisconsin Badgers, Providence Friars, Bowling Green Falcons, and Yale Bulldogs. The Badgers and Friars took the championship game into overtime and ended with a final score of 2-2. The Badgers would ultimately win the inaugural Holiday Face–Off championship on a shootout goal by freshman forward, Zach Urdahl.

The 2026 iteration of the Holiday Face-Off is scheduled for December 29–30, 2026. The participants are the Arizona State Sun Devils, the Northern Michigan Wildcats, the UMass Minutemen and the Wisconsin Badgers.

== Yearly results ==
Season	Champion	Runner-up	Third place	Fourth place
2025	7 Western Michigan	2 Wisconsin	13 Boston College	Lake Superior State
2024	Wisconsin	Connecticut	Alaska	Ferris State
2023	6 Wisconsin	Northeastern	Minnesota Duluth	Air Force Falcons
2022	Clarkson	Wisconsin	15 Massachusetts	Lake Superior State
2021	Wisconsin	16 Providence	Bowling Green	Yale

== Team records ==
Team	Titles	Runner-up	Third place	Fourth place	Years participated
Wisconsin	3	2	0	0	5
Western Michigan	1	0	0	0	1
Clarkson	1	0	0	0	1
Lake Superior State	0	0	0	2	2
Boston College	0	0	1	0	1
UConn	0	1	0	0	1
Alaska	0	0	1	0	1
Ferris State	0	0	0	1	1
Northeastern	0	1	0	0	1
Minnesota Duluth	0	0	1	0	1
Air Force	0	0	0	1	1
UMass	0	0	1	0	1
Providence	0	1	0	0	1
Bowling Green	0	0	1	0	1
Yale	0	0	0	1	1
