= 2021–22 North Dakota Fighting Hawks men's ice hockey season =

NCHC, Co-Champion NCAA tournament, Regional semifinal
- Conference: T–1st NCHC
- Home ice: Ralph Engelstad Arena

Rankings
- USCHO.com: #9
- USA Today: #9

Record
- Overall: 24–14–1
- Conference: 17–6–1
- Home: 14–4–1
- Road: 10–7–0
- Neutral: 0–3–0

Coaches and captains
- Head coach: Brad Berry
- Assistant coaches: Dane Jackson; Karl Goehring; Jason Ulmer
- Captain: Mark Senden
- Alternate captain(s): Ethan Frisch; Gavin Hain; Jake Sanderson

The 2021–22 North Dakota Fighting Hawks men's ice hockey season was the 82nd season of play for the program. They represented the University of North Dakota in the 2021–22 NCAA Division I men's ice hockey season and for the 9th season in the National Collegiate Hockey Conference (NCHC). The Fighting Hawks were coached by Brad Berry, in his seventh season, and played their home games at Ralph Engelstad Arena.

== Season ==
North Dakota's lineup saw a great deal of change with 14 of the team's 26 players in their first year with the program. While several were transfers from other schools, head coach Brad Berry had his work cut out for him in getting the team to work together. Despite the turnover, UND was still seen as having a good chance at the title and was ranked in the top ten in the preseason polls. However, the Hawks struggled with consistency early in the season and only possessed a middling record after the first month of the campaign. Once the team got into its conference schedule, they began playing much better and rose to the top of the NCHC.

When they returned after the winter break, North Dakota was in the top five in both polls but the offense sputtered. UND lost four games in a row, all to ranked teams, and began sinking in both the rankings and the standings. They recovered at the end of January and then had a tremendous month by winning seven out of eight games in February. The extended winning streak put them back atop the conference standings and had the Hawks set up for a 1st-place finish. Unfortunately, losing to Omaha in the final game of the regular season put UND into a tie with Denver and, because the Pioneers possessed the tie-breaker, meant that North Dakota received the number two seed for the NCHC tournament.

The entire second half of the Hawks season was dominated by the status of Jake Sanderson, the team's top prospect. He was not able to play a single game after January 29 due to joining Team USA at the 2022 Winter Olympics. During the competition, He came down with COVID-19, forcing him to miss the first game, and was then injured during the preliminary round. He remained out of the Fighting Hawks lineup for the rest of the regular season before returning for the team's quarterfinal match against Colorado College.

Sanderson opened the scoring on his return, however, in spite of the boost his reappearance provided, the Hawks did not play well against the Tigers. North Dakota had almost three times as many wins as CC during the season but they got a huge fight from their opponents. UND only managed to score twice in each of the two games and it was only through the heroics of Zach Driscoll in goal that they managed to squeeze through into the semifinals. To make matters worse, Sanderson was injured while blocking a shot in the second match and ended up needing wrist surgery to repair the damage. While the team had demonstrated an ability to win without the big defenseman, they were not able to replicate that effort in the semifinal and fell to Western Michigan.

=== NCAA tournament ===
Though the loss was disappointing, North Dakota was already guaranteed a bid for the NCAA tournament and received a number two seed, one of five NCHC teams in the field. They opened against Notre Dame, a team that played an almost identical style of defensive hockey. The match lived up to predictions as a slow, methodical game with few scoring attempts and solid goaltending. Brent Johnson scored near the end of the first period to give UND the lead but their advantage lasted less than 3 minutes before ND evened the match. Near the end of regulation, when it appeared that the game was heading into overtime, Notre Dame got the puck deep into the Hawks' end before passing it out to an open man in the slot and scored with less than a second to play. While the Irish celebrated, however, the referees reviewed the play and found a discrepancy in the time. The broadcast clock and the official game clock were not in synch, and the file was reviewed to determine which was correct. After a long process, it was determined that the game had ended moments before the puck entered the goal and the Hawks were saved from defeat.

UND began the extra session on the power play, however, a gaff at the blueline forced Chris Jandric to take a penalty to stop a Notre Dame breakaway. After the ensuing 4-on-4 finished, The Irish got an abbreviated man-advantage and made no mistake, potting the winner and ending North Dakota's season.

== Departures ==
Player	Position	Nationality	Cause
Collin Adams	Forward	United States	Graduation (signed with New York Islanders)
Gabe Bast	Defenseman	Canada	Graduation (signed with KalPa)
Jacob Bernard-Docker	Defenseman	Canada	Signed professional contract (Ottawa Senators)
Harrison Blaisdell	Forward	United Kingdom	Transferred to New Hampshire
Jordan Kawaguchi	Forward	Canada	Graduation (signed with Dallas Stars)
Jackson Keane	Forward	United States	Signed professional contract (Wheeling Nailers)
Matt Kiersted	Defenseman	United States	Graduation (signed with Florida Panthers)
Grant Mismash	Forward	United States	Graduation (signed with Nashville Predators)
Shane Pinto	Forward	United States	Signed professional contract (Ottawa Senators)
Josh Rieger	Defenseman	Canada	Graduate transfer to Calgary
Adam Scheel	Goaltender	United States	Signed professional contract (Dallas Stars)
Peter Thome	Goaltender	United States	Graduate transfer to St. Thomas
Jasper Weatherby	Forward	United States	Signed professional contract (San Jose Sharks)

== Recruiting ==
Player	Position	Nationality	Age	Notes
Luke Bast	Defenseman	Canada	20	Red Deer, AB
Ashton Calder	Forward	United States	20	Sault Ste. Marie, MI; transfer from Lake Superior State
Matteo Costantini	Forward	Canada	19	St. Catharines, ON; selected 131st overall in 2020
Zach Driscoll	Goaltender	United States	24	Apple Valley, MN; transfer from Bemidji State
Brady Ferner	Defenseman	United States	24	Dakota Dunes, SD; transfer from Rensselaer
Connor Ford	Forward	United States	23	Pittsburgh, PA; graduate transfer from Bowling Green
Jakob Hellsten	Goaltender	Sweden	21	Ljusdal, SWE
Chris Jandric	Defenseman	Canada	22	Prince George, BC; transfer from Alaska
Brent Johnson	Defenseman	United States	18	Dallas, TX; selected 80th overall in 2021
Kaleb Johnson	Goaltender	United States	20	Grand Forks, ND
Jackson Kunz	Forward	United States	19	Grand Forks, ND; selected 113th overall in 2020
Dane Montgomery	Forward	United States	19	Grand Forks, ND
Nick Portz	Forward	United States	21	St. Cloud, MN
Jake Schmaltz	Forward	United States	20	McFarland, WI; selected 192nd overall in 2019

== Roster ==
As of September 6, 2021.

No.	Nat.	Player	Class	Pos	Height	Weight	DoB	Hometown	Previous team	NHL rights
1	(United States)	Kaleb Johnson	Freshman	G	5' 11" (1.8 m)	178 lb (81 kg)	2001-01-07	Grand Forks, North Dakota	Minnesota Wilderness (NAHL)	—
2	(United States)	Brady Ferner	Junior	D	5' 10" (1.78 m)	193 lb (88 kg)	1997-08-27	Dakota Dunes, South Dakota	RPI (ECAC)	—
4	(United States)	Cooper Moore	Sophomore	D	6' 1" (1.85 m)	182 lb (83 kg)	2001-02-16	Cos Cob, Connecticut	Chilliwack (BCHL)	DET, 128th overall 2019
5	(United States)	Dane Montgomery	Freshman	F	5' 10" (1.78 m)	170 lb (77 kg)	2002-01-07	Grand Forks, North Dakota	Waterloo (USHL)	—
6	(United States)	Brent Johnson	Freshman	D	5' 9" (1.75 m)	174 lb (79 kg)	2003-03-20	Frisco, Texas	Sioux Falls (USHL)	WSH, 80th overall 2021
7	(Canada)	Chris Jandric	Graduate	D	5' 10" (1.78 m)	175 lb (79 kg)	1998-10-03	Prince George, British Columbia	Alaska (WCHA)	—
8	(United States)	Jake Schmaltz	Freshman	F	6' 2" (1.88 m)	183 lb (83 kg)	2001-04-24	McFarland, Wisconsin	Green Bay (USHL)	BOS, 192nd overall 2019
9	(Canada)	Brendan Budy	Sophomore	F	5' 10" (1.78 m)	180 lb (82 kg)	2000-06-06	Langley, British Columbia	Langley (BCHL)	—
10	(United States)	Gavin Hain (A)	Senior	F	6' 0" (1.83 m)	184 lb (83 kg)	2000-04-03	Grand Rapids, Minnesota	USNTDP (USHL)	PHI, 174th overall 2018
11	(United States)	Griffin Ness	Sophomore	F	5' 11" (1.8 m)	174 lb (79 kg)	1999-12-10	Wayzata, Minnesota	Waterloo (USHL)	—
13	(Canada)	Carson Albrecht	Junior	F	5' 10" (1.78 m)	193 lb (88 kg)	1998-05-23	Martensville, Saskatchewan	Melfort (SJHL)	—
15	(United States)	Ethan Frisch (A)	Junior	D	5' 11" (1.8 m)	187 lb (85 kg)	2000-10-29	Moorhead, Minnesota	Fargo (USHL)	—
16	(United States)	Ashton Calder	Junior	F	6' 1" (1.85 m)	195 lb (88 kg)	1998-02-09	Sault Ste. Marie, Michigan	Lake Superior State (WCHA)	—
17	(Canada)	Riese Gaber	Sophomore	F	5' 8" (1.73 m)	161 lb (73 kg)	1999-10-10	Gilbert Plains, Manitoba	Dubuque (USHL)	—
18	(Canada)	Matteo Costantini	Freshman	F	6' 1" (1.85 m)	187 lb (85 kg)	2002-08-16	St. Catharines, Ontario	Sioux City (USHL)	BUF, 131st overall 2020
19	(United States)	Mark Senden (C)	Senior	F	5' 11" (1.8 m)	194 lb (88 kg)	1998-01-22	Medina, Minnesota	Fargo (USHL)	—
20	(United States)	Nick Portz	Freshman	F	5' 11" (1.8 m)	174 lb (79 kg)	2000-05-15	St. Cloud, Minnesota	Muskegon (USHL)	—
21	(United States)	Connor Ford	Graduate	F	6' 0" (1.83 m)	186 lb (84 kg)	1998-02-05	Pittsburgh, Pennsylvania	Bowling Green (WCHA)	—
24	(Canada)	Luke Bast	Freshman	D	5' 10" (1.78 m)	180 lb (82 kg)	2000-11-20	Red Deer, Alberta	Waterloo (USHL)	—
25	(United States)	Tyler Kleven	Sophomore	D	6' 4" (1.93 m)	198 lb (90 kg)	2002-01-10	Fargo, North Dakota	USNTDP (USHL)	OTT, 44th overall 2020
26	(United States)	Jake Sanderson (A)	Sophomore	D	6' 0" (1.83 m)	183 lb (83 kg)	2002-07-08	Whitefish, Montana	USNTDP (USHL)	OTT, 5th overall 2020
27	(Canada)	Louis Jamernik	Sophomore	F	5' 11" (1.8 m)	190 lb (86 kg)	2000-02-22	Calgary, Alberta	Okotoks (AJHL)	—
28	(United States)	Judd Caulfield	Junior	F	6' 3" (1.91 m)	203 lb (92 kg)	2001-03-19	Grand Forks, North Dakota	USNTDP (USHL)	PIT, 145th overall 2019
29	(United States)	Jackson Kunz	Freshman	F	6' 3" (1.91 m)	220 lb (100 kg)	2002-08-13	Grand Forks, North Dakota	Green Bay (USHL)	VAN, 113th overall 2020
32	(Sweden)	Jakob Hellsten	Freshman	G	5' 11" (1.8 m)	180 lb (82 kg)	2000-02-02	Ljusdal, Sweden	Halmstad (Hockeyettan)	—
33	(United States)	Zach Driscoll	Senior	G	5' 11" (1.8 m)	180 lb (82 kg)	1997-02-25	Apple Valley, Minnesota	Bemidji State (WCHA)	—
35	(United States)	Harrison Feeney	Senior	G	6' 1" (1.85 m)	217 lb (98 kg)	1998-02-04	Lafayette Hill, Pennsylvania	Lone Star (NAHL)	—

== Standings ==
2021–22 National Collegiate Hockey Conference Standings
	Conference record										Overall record					
	GP	W	L	T	OTW	OTL	3/SW	PTS	GF	GA	GP	W	L	T	GF	GA
#1 Denver †	24	18	6	0	1	0	0	53	98	55	41	31	9	1	175	93
#9 North Dakota †	24	17	6	1	1	1	1	53	78	58	39	24	14	1	119	99
#6 Western Michigan	24	14	9	1	1	0	1	43	84	68	39	26	12	1	138	101
#11 St. Cloud State	24	10	10	4	1	2	1	36	84	69	37	18	15	4	133	97
#5 Minnesota Duluth *	24	10	10	4	1	1	2	36	61	56	42	22	16	4	109	93
Omaha	24	11	13	0	2	1	0	32	65	74	38	21	17	0	123	102
Colorado College	24	6	17	1	2	1	0	18	48	87	36	9	24	3	79	116
Miami	24	4	19	1	0	3	1	17	54	105	36	7	27	2	94	153
Championship: March 19, 2022 † indicates conference regular season champion (Penrose Cup) * indicates conference tournament champion (Frozen Faceoff Championship Trophy); Rankings: USCHO.com Top 20 Poll

== Schedule and results ==
Date	Time	Opponent^{#}	Rank^{#}	Site	TV	Decision	Result	Attendance	Record
Exhibition
October 2	6:07 PM	#14 Bemidji State*	#8	Ralph Engelstad Arena • Grand Forks, North Dakota (Exhibition)			W 2–1	11,812	—
Regular season
October 8	7:07 PM	Niagara*	#8	Ralph Engelstad Arena • Grand Forks, North Dakota		Driscoll	W 6–2	11,386	1–0–0
October 9	6:07 PM	Niagara*	#8	Ralph Engelstad Arena • Grand Forks, North Dakota		Driscoll	W 4–0	11,689	2–0–0
October 15	7:07 PM	at #20 Bemidji State*	#7	Sanford Center • Bemidji, Minnesota		Driscoll	W 4–3	4,242	2–1–0
October 16	6:07 PM	#20 Bemidji State*	#7	Ralph Engelstad Arena • Grand Forks, North Dakota		Driscoll	L 3–4 ^{OT}	11,314	3–1–0
October 22	6:00 PM	at #7 Quinnipiac*	#6	People's United Center • Hamden, Connecticut		Driscoll	L 2–5	3,498	3–2–0
October 23	6:00 PM	at #7 Quinnipiac*	#6	People's United Center • Hamden, Connecticut		Driscoll	W 3–1	3,512	4–2–0
October 30	7:07 PM	vs. Penn State*	#6	Bridgestone Arena • Nashville, Tennessee (US Hockey Hall of Fame Game)		Driscoll	L 4–6	14,659	4–3–0
November 5	7:07 PM	#11 Denver	#8	Ralph Engelstad Arena • Grand Forks, North Dakota		Driscoll	W 3–1	11,058	5–3–0 (1–0–0)
November 6	6:05 PM	#11 Denver	#8	Ralph Engelstad Arena • Grand Forks, North Dakota		Driscoll	W 4–1	11,337	6–3–0 (2–0–0)
November 12	6:05 PM	at Miami	#7	Steve Cady Arena • Oxford, Ohio		Driscoll	W 4–1	3,135	7–3–0 (3–0–0)
November 13	4:05 PM	at Miami	#7	Steve Cady Arena • Oxford, Ohio		Driscoll	W 5–4	2,626	8–3–0 (4–0–0)
November 19	7:07 PM	#4 Minnesota Duluth	#6	Ralph Engelstad Arena • Grand Forks, North Dakota		Driscoll	L 1–4	11,686	8–4–0 (4–1–0)
November 20	6:07 PM	#4 Minnesota Duluth	#6	Ralph Engelstad Arena • Grand Forks, North Dakota		Driscoll	W 2–1	11,858	9–4–0 (5–1–0)
November 26	7:07 PM	#11 Minnesota*	#6	Ralph Engelstad Arena • Grand Forks, North Dakota	Midco	Driscoll	L 1–5	11,624	10–4–0
November 27	6:07 PM	#11 Minnesota*	#6	Ralph Engelstad Arena • Grand Forks, North Dakota	Midco	Driscoll	W 3–2	11,617	10–5–0
December 3	7:37 PM	at #5 St. Cloud State	#7	Herb Brooks National Hockey Center • St. Cloud, Minnesota		Driscoll	L 1–8	4,703	10–6–0 (5–2–0)
December 4	6:07 PM	at #5 St. Cloud State	#7	Herb Brooks National Hockey Center • St. Cloud, Minnesota		Driscoll	W 5–3	5,224	11–6–0 (6–2–0)
December 10	8:07 PM	at Colorado College	#7	Ed Robson Arena • Colorado Springs, Colorado	Midco, ATTRM	Driscoll	W 5–2	3,587	12–6–0 (7–2–0)
December 11	7:07 PM	at Colorado College	#7	Ed Robson Arena • Colorado Springs, Colorado		Hellsten	W 4–1	3,569	13–6–0 (8–2–0)
Exhibition
January 1	2:37 PM	USNTDP*	#5	Ralph Engelstad Arena • Grand Forks, North Dakota (Exhibition)	Midco	Hellsten	L 0–2	10,291	—
Regular season
January 7	7:07 PM	#14 Cornell*	#5	Ralph Engelstad Arena • Grand Forks, North Dakota		Driscoll	L 3–4	10,128	13–7–0
January 8	6:07 PM	#14 Cornell*	#5	Ralph Engelstad Arena • Grand Forks, North Dakota		Driscoll	L 1–3	11,192	13–8–0
January 21	6:05 PM	at #4 Western Michigan	#9	Lawson Arena • Kalamazoo, Michigan		Driscoll	L 1–4	3,769	13–9–0 (8–3–0)
January 22	6:05 PM	at #4 Western Michigan	#9	Lawson Arena • Kalamazoo, Michigan		Hellsten	L 0–2	3,567	13–10–0 (8–4–0)
January 28	7:07 PM	#6 St. Cloud State	#13	Ralph Engelstad Arena • Grand Forks, North Dakota		Hellsten	W 7–1	11,417	14–10–0 (9–4–0)
January 29	6:07 PM	#6 St. Cloud State	#13	Ralph Engelstad Arena • Grand Forks, North Dakota		Driscoll	T 3–3 ^{SOW}	11,876	14–10–1 (9–4–1)
February 4	7:07 PM	#18 Omaha	#12	Ralph Engelstad Arena • Grand Forks, North Dakota		Driscoll	W 4–1	11,173	15–10–1 (10–4–1)
February 5	6:07 PM	#18 Omaha	#12	Ralph Engelstad Arena • Grand Forks, North Dakota		Driscoll	L 2–3 ^{OT}	11,632	15–11–1 (10–5–1)
February 11	7:07 PM	Colorado College	#12	Ralph Engelstad Arena • Grand Forks, North Dakota	ATTRM	Driscoll	W 3–2	10,842	16–11–1 (11–5–1)
February 12	6:07 PM	Colorado College	#12	Ralph Engelstad Arena • Grand Forks, North Dakota		Driscoll	W 4–0	11,180	17–11–1 (12–5–1)
February 18	7:07 PM	at #7 Minnesota Duluth	#9	AMSOIL Arena • Duluth, Minnesota	CBSSN	Driscoll	W 4–3	6,453	18–11–1 (13–5–1)
February 19	7:07 PM	at #7 Minnesota Duluth	#9	AMSOIL Arena • Duluth, Minnesota		Driscoll	W 3–2	7,206	19–11–1 (14–5–1)
February 25	7:07 PM	#6 Western Michigan	#7	Ralph Engelstad Arena • Grand Forks, North Dakota	CBSSN	Driscoll	W 2–1	11,510	20–11–1 (15–5–1)
February 26	6:07 PM	#6 Western Michigan	#7	Ralph Engelstad Arena • Grand Forks, North Dakota		Driscoll	W 5–2	12,088	21–11–1 (16–5–1)
March 4	7:07 PM	at #20 Omaha	#4	Baxter Arena • Omaha, Nebraska		Driscoll	W 5–4 ^{OT}	6,387	22–11–1 (17–5–1)
March 5	6:07 PM	at #20 Omaha	#4	Baxter Arena • Omaha, Nebraska		Hellsten	L 1–4	6,748	22–12–1 (17–6–1)
NCHC Tournament
March 11	7:07 PM	Colorado College*	#5	Ralph Engelstad Arena • Grand Forks, North Dakota (Quarterfinal Game 1)		Driscoll	W 2–1	10,475	23–12–1
March 12	6:07 PM	Colorado College*	#5	Ralph Engelstad Arena • Grand Forks, North Dakota (Quarterfinal Game 2)		Driscoll	W 2–1	10,095	24–12–1
March 18	7:37 PM	vs. #7 Western Michigan*	#5	Xcel Energy Center • Saint Paul, Minnesota (Semifinal)	CBSSN	Driscoll	L 2–4	10,253	24–13–1
NCAA tournament
March 25	5:00 PM	vs. #9 Notre Dame*	#7	MVP Arena • Albany, New York (East Regional semifinal)	ESPNU	Driscoll	L 1–2 ^{OT}	2,345	24–14–1
*Non-conference game. ^{#}Rankings from USCHO.com Poll. All times are in Central Time. Source:

== Scoring statistics ==
Name	Position	Games	Goals	Assists	Points	PIM
Riese Gaber	RW	34	15	22	37	28
Connor Ford	RW	37	4	24	28	8
Jake Sanderson	D	23	8	18	26	6
Jake Schmaltz	C/LW	39	8	16	24	10
Ashton Calder	F	34	11	10	21	14
Matteo Costantini	C	35	8	13	21	4
Judd Caulfield	RW	39	11	9	20	10
Louis Jamernik	RW	37	9	10	19	32
Mark Senden	C	34	5	12	17	16
Ethan Frisch	D	36	9	6	15	16
Chris Jandric	D	38	1	14	15	39
Tyler Kleven	D	38	7	3	10	93
Gavin Hain	C	18	6	3	9	18
Cooper Moore	D	38	2	7	9	49
Nick Portz	F	39	2	5	7	18
Jackson Kunz	C	31	3	3	6	31
Luke Bast	D	26	2	4	6	4
Carson Albrecht	RW	29	2	4	6	8
Griffin Ness	F	36	2	4	6	23
Brady Ferner	D	29	0	4	4	6
Brent Johnson	D	23	2	1	3	12
Dane Montgomery	RW	16	1	2	3	2
Brendan Budy	LW	22	1	0	1	6
Harrison Feeney	G	1	0	0	0	0
Jakob Hellsten	G	7	0	0	0	0
Zach Driscoll	G	34	0	0	0	0
Total			110	194	313	453

== Goaltending statistics ==
Name	Games	Minutes	Wins	Losses	Ties	Goals against	Saves	Shut outs	SV %	GAA
Zach Driscoll	34	1970	22	11	1	77	757	2	.908	2.35
Jakob Hellsten	7	364	2	3	0	18	131	0	.879	2.97
Empty Net	-	17	-	-	-	4	-	-	-	-
Total	39	2351	24	14	1	99	888	2	.899	2.53

== Rankings ==
Poll	Week																									
Poll	Pre	1	2	3	4	5	6	7	8	9	10	11	12	13	14	15	16	17	18	19	20	21	22	23	24	25 (Final)
USCHO.com	8 (2)	8	7	6	6	8	7	6	6	7	7	5	5	10	9	13	12	12	9	7	4	5	5	7	-	9
USA Today	7	7	6	6	6	10	7	6	5	7	7	5	5	11	10	13	11	12	10	7	5	5	5	8	9	9

Note: USCHO did not release a poll in week 24.

== Awards and honors ==
Player	Award	Ref
Brad Berry	Herb Brooks Coach of the Year	
Zach Driscoll	Lowes' Senior CLASS Award	
Zach Driscoll	NCHC Second Team	
Jake Sanderson	NCHC Second Team	
Connor Ford	NCHC Defensive Forward of the Year	
Ethan Frisch	NCHC Defensive Defenseman of the Year	
Riese Gaber	NCHC First Team	
Jakob Hellsten	NCHC Rookie Team	
Matteo Costantini	NCHC Rookie Team	
Jake Sanderson	AHCA West First Team All-American	
Jake Sanderson	NCHC Preseason All-Conference Team	
Mark Senden	NCHC Sportsmanship Award	

== Players drafted into the NHL ==
=== 2022 NHL entry draft ===
Round	Pick	Player	NHL team
2	40	Dylan James^{†}	Detroit Red Wings
7	209	Abram Wiebe^{†}	Vegas Golden Knights
7	210	Ben Striden^{†}	Nashville Predators

† incoming freshman
