= 2021–22 Minnesota Golden Gophers men's ice hockey season =

Big Ten, Champion NCAA tournament, National semifinal
- Conference: 1st Big Ten
- Home ice: 3M Arena at Mariucci

Rankings
- USCHO: #4
- USA Today: #4

Record
- Overall: 26–13–0
- Conference: 18–6–0
- Home: 13–7–0
- Road: 11–5–0
- Neutral: 2–1–0

Coaches and captains
- Head coach: Bob Motzko
- Assistant coaches: Garrett Raboin; Ben Gordon; Karel Popper
- Captain(s): Jack LaFontaine; Ben Meyers; Sammy Walker

The 2021–22 Minnesota Golden Gophers men's ice hockey season was the 101st season of play for the program. They represented the University of Minnesota in the 2021–22 NCAA Division I men's ice hockey season. This season marked the 32nd season in the Big Ten Conference. They were coached by Bob Motzko, in his fourth season, and played their home games at 3M Arena at Mariucci.

== Season ==
Minnesota came into the season ranked 4th in both preseason polls. The lofty expectations were due mostly to the quality of returning players, which included starting goaltender and co-captain, Jack LaFontaine who was the reigning Mike Richter Award winner. In addition, Minnesota added five NHL-drafted players to their roster. Despite the prognostications, The Gophers got off to a less-than-stellar start. The team swept their opening weekend in spite of a sloppy defensive effort and followed that up- by playing .500 hockey for two months. The Minnesota offense showed up on most nights but, surprisingly, it was LaFontaine who appeared to be the team's biggest problem. The team's starter was inconsistent for the first half of the year, rarely posting consecutive games with solid results.

By the time Christmas rolled around, Minnesota was just 2 games above .500 and were in the middle of the Big Ten standings. The only saving grace for the team was their strength of schedule. Due to playing three top-10 non-conference teams, as well as three other ranked clubs within their conference, Minnesota was still on pace to earn a bid to the NCAA tournament.

The Gophers opened the second half of their season with a sweep over lowly Michigan State but then suffered a massive loss. On January 9 Jack LaFontaine, who had played all but 28 minutes in goal for the team to that point, signed a profession contract with the Carolina Hurricanes and ended his college career. Minnesota was forced to turn to junior Justen Close, who hadn't started a game in three years. The defense rallied around the Saskatchewan native and kept him insulated for several games as he got used to his new role on the team. Close managed to break even for the remainder of January even while playing two tournament-bound teams.

Once the calendar turned to February, Close began looking like a top-flight goalie and he backstopped the Gophers to their best performance all season. Though they had lost Brock Faber, Ben Meyers and Matthew Knies to the US Olympic team, Minnesota won their final eight regular season games and shot up both the standings and the rankings. In their final weekend before the playoffs, Minnesota shut out long time rival Wisconsin twice in the same weekend. The last time that had happened was in 1934, over 88 years earlier. The winning streak placed Minnesota atop the conference standings and gave the Gophers a bye into the Big Ten semifinals.

=== Postseason ===
Minnesota remained at home and welcomed an upstart Penn State team to Mariucci. Despite having not played in two weeks, the Gophers got out to a 2-goal lead early in the second period. The Nittany Lions, however, stormed back to tie the game. Close held the fort in the third, giving co-Captain Sammy Walker the time he needed to score the winning goal. The team then faced Michigan for the title and while both teams were already guaranteed appearances in the NCAA tournament, they were fighting for more than just pride. Jaxon Nelson opened the scoring just 32 seconds into the game but that was the high point for the Gophers. The Wolverines scored four times over the next 30 minutes and took a commanding lead. As the clock ticked, Minnesota was unable to generate anything on the scoresheet until Michigan was handed a pair of penalties near the end of regulation. The Gophers scored on both powerplays, cutting the lead to just a single goal, but the second marker came with just 5 seconds left. Minnesota's comeback started just a bit too late and the Gophers were forced to watch Michigan celebrate a championship.

=== NCAA tournament ===
The loss caused Minnesota to drop just enough to receive a #2 seed in the tournament and were set against the defending national champion, Massachusetts. Early on it looked to be a bad match for the Gophers when UMass scored twice in the first but a late goal by Ryan Johnson got Minnesota back in the game before the period was over. After trading goals in the second, Knies knotted the score a 3-all in the third period and the two teams fought to a draw after 60 minutes. The Gophers traded chances with the Minutemen in overtime with the other co-Captain, Meyers, netting the winner on a pass from Aaron Huglen.

In the second round, Minnesota looked dominant against Western Michigan and shut down one of the strongest offenses in the nation. While the Gophers weren't particularly outstanding offensively, Close stopped all 24 shots that came his way and his third shutout of the season sent Minnesota to the frozen four.

Their semifinal opponent, Minnesota State, was the same team that had knocked Minnesota out of the tournament the year before. Unfortunately for the Gophers, they weren't able to produce a different result. After Knies opened the scoring, the Mavericks ran roughshod over the Maroon and Gold and scored the final 5 goals of the game. Though the finale was Minnesota's worst loss all season, the team was still one of the last four teams standing and could take pride in reaching the program's 22nd national semifinal.

== Departures ==
Player	Position	Nationality	Cause
Nathan Burke	Forward	United States	Transferred to Bowling Green
Jack LaFontaine	Goaltender	Canada	Left mid-season (signed with Carolina Hurricanes)
Brannon McManus	Forward	United States	Graduate transfer to Omaha
Jared Moe	Goaltender	United States	Transferred to Wisconsin
Cullen Munson	Forward	United States	Graduation (retired)
Sampo Ranta	Forward	Finland	Signed professional contract (Colorado Avalanche)
Scott Reedy	Forward	United States	Graduation (signed with San Jose Sharks)
Robbie Stucker	Defenseman	United States	Transferred to Vermont
Noah Weber	Forward	United States	Left program (retired)

== Recruiting ==
Player	Position	Nationality	Age	Notes
Owen Bartoszkiewicz	Goaltender	United States	18	Northville, MI; Joined team mid-season
Brennan Boynton	Goaltender	United States	21	Champlin, MN
Tristan Broz	Forward	United States	18	Bloomington, MN; selected 58th overall in 2021
Grant Cruikshank	Forward	United States	23	Delafield, WI; transfer from Colorado College
Aaron Huglen	Forward	United States	20	Roseau, MN; selected 102nd overall in 2019
Matthew Knies	Forward	United States	18	Phoenix, AZ; selected 57th overall in 2021
Chaz Lucius	Forward	United States	18	Lawrence, KS; selected 18th overall in 2021
Rhett Pitlick	Forward	United States	20	Chaska, MN; selected 131st overall in 2019

== Roster ==
As of April 21, 2021.

No.	Nat.	Player	Class	Pos	Height	Weight	DoB	Hometown	Previous team	NHL rights
1	(Canada)	Justen Close	Junior	G	5' 10" (1.78 m)	175 lb (79 kg)	1998-05-20	Kindersley, Saskatchewan	Kindersley Klippers (SJHL)	—
2	(United States)	Jackson LaCombe	Junior	D	6' 2" (1.88 m)	200 lb (91 kg)	2001-01-09	Eden Prairie, Minnesota	Shattuck-Saint Mary's (Midget AAA)	ANA, 39th overall 2019
4	(United States)	Ben Brinkman	Senior	D	6' 1" (1.85 m)	220 lb (100 kg)	2000-10-04	Edina, Minnesota	Edina High School (USHS–MN)	DAL, 173rd overall 2019
5	(United States)	Matt Denman	Senior	D	6' 0" (1.83 m)	185 lb (84 kg)	1998-04-20	Prior Lake, Minnesota	Cedar Rapids RoughRiders (USHL)	—
6	(United States)	Mike Koster	Sophomore	D	5' 10" (1.78 m)	180 lb (82 kg)	2001-04-13	Chaska, Minnesota	Tri-City Storm (USHL)	TOR, 146th overall 2019
7	(United States)	Aaron Huglen	Freshman	F	6' 0" (1.83 m)	170 lb (77 kg)	2001-03-06	Roseau, Minnesota	Fargo Force (USHL)	BUF, 102nd overall 2019
9	(United States)	Sammy Walker (C)	Senior	F	5' 11" (1.8 m)	180 lb (82 kg)	1999-06-07	Edina, Minnesota	Edina High School (USHS–MN)	TBL, 200th overall 2017
10	(United States)	Tristan Broz	Freshman	F	6' 0" (1.83 m)	179 lb (81 kg)	2002-10-10	Bloomington, Minnesota	Fargo Force (USHL)	PIT, 58th overall 2021
11	(United States)	Jonny Sorenson	Junior	F	6' 1" (1.85 m)	180 lb (82 kg)	1999-09-21	St. Louis Park, Minnesota	Fairbanks Ice Dogs (NAHL)	—
14	(United States)	Brock Faber	Sophomore	D	6' 1" (1.85 m)	200 lb (91 kg)	2002-08-22	Maple Grove, Minnesota	USNTDP (USHL)	LAK, 45th overall 2020
16	(United States)	Colin Schmidt	Junior	F	6' 4" (1.93 m)	230 lb (104 kg)	2000-01-06	Wayzata, Minnesota	Union (ECAC)	—
18	(United States)	Mason Nevers	Sophomore	F	5' 11" (1.8 m)	175 lb (79 kg)	2001-04-03	Edina, Minnesota	Des Moines Buccaneers (USHL)	—
21	(United States)	Grant Cruikshank	Senior	F	5' 11" (1.8 m)	190 lb (86 kg)	1998-07-19	Delafield, Wisconsin	Colorado College (NCHC)	—
22	(United States)	Bryce Brodzinski	Junior	F	6' 0" (1.83 m)	205 lb (93 kg)	2000-08-09	Blaine, Minnesota	Blaine High School (USHS–MN)	PHI, 196th overall 2019
23	(United States)	Ryan Johnson	Junior	D	6' 1" (1.85 m)	190 lb (86 kg)	2001-07-24	Irvine, California	Sioux Falls Stampede (USHL)	BUF, 31st overall 2019
24	(United States)	Jaxon Nelson	Junior	F	6' 4" (1.93 m)	225 lb (102 kg)	2000-03-30	Magnolia, Minnesota	Omaha Lancers (USHL)	—
25	(United States)	Jack Perbix	Junior	F	6' 1" (1.85 m)	190 lb (86 kg)	2000-09-13	Elk River, Minnesota	Des Moines Buccaneers (USHL)	ANA, 116th overall 2018
26	(United States)	Carl Fish	Sophomore	D	6' 3" (1.91 m)	210 lb (95 kg)	1999-11-09	St. Paul, Minnesota	Bismarck Bobcats (NAHL)	—
27	(United States)	Blake McLaughlin	Senior	F	6' 0" (1.83 m)	170 lb (77 kg)	2000-02-14	Grand Rapids, Minnesota	Chicago Steel (USHL)	ANA, 79th overall 2018
28	(United States)	Sam Rossini	Graduate	D	6' 4" (1.93 m)	190 lb (86 kg)	1998-06-19	Burnsville, Minnesota	Penticton Vees (BCHL)	—
29	(United States)	Chaz Lucius	Freshman	F	6' 1" (1.85 m)	185 lb (84 kg)	2003-05-02	Grant, Minnesota	USNTDP (USHL)	WPG, 18th overall 2021
31	(United States)	Owen Bartoszkiewicz	Freshman	G	6' 1" (1.85 m)	195 lb (88 kg)	2003-03-11	Northville, Michigan	Youngstown Phantoms (USHL)	—
33	(United States)	Brennan Boynton	Freshman	G	6' 0" (1.83 m)	175 lb (79 kg)	2000-08-01	Champlin, Minnesota	Fargo Force (USHL)	—
39	(United States)	Ben Meyers (C)	Junior	F	5' 11" (1.8 m)	200 lb (91 kg)	1998-11-15	Delano, Minnesota	Fargo Force (USHL)	—
55	(United States)	Matt Staudacher	Junior	D	6' 1" (1.85 m)	200 lb (91 kg)	2000-02-07	Fenton, Michigan	Muskegon Lumberjacks (USHL)	—
77	(United States)	Rhett Pitlick	Freshman	F	5' 10" (1.78 m)	165 lb (75 kg)	2001-02-07	Chaska, Minnesota	Tri-City Storm (USHL)	MTL, 131st overall 2019
89	(United States)	Matthew Knies	Freshman	F	6' 3" (1.91 m)	210 lb (95 kg)	2002-10-17	Phoenix, Arizona	Tri-City Storm (USHL)	TOR, 57th overall 2021

== Standings ==
2021–22 Big Ten ice hockey Standings
	Conference record										Overall record					
	GP	W	L	T	OTW	OTL	3/SW	PTS	GF	GA	GP	W	L	T	GF	GA
#5 Minnesota †	24	18	6	0	1	2	0	55	90	50	39	26	13	0	138	91
#2 Michigan *	24	16	8	0	0	3	0	51	91	59	42	31	10	1	167	94
#9 Notre Dame	24	17	7	0	5	1	0	47	74	55	40	28	12	0	122	75
#16 Ohio State	24	13	9	2	1	1	1	42	76	59	37	22	13	2	125	87
Penn State	24	6	17	1	1	1	1	20	63	92	38	17	20	1	117	122
Wisconsin	24	6	17	1	1	2	0	20	53	96	37	10	24	3	76	132
Michigan State	24	6	18	0	1	0	0	17	51	87	36	12	23	1	76	119
Championship: March 19, 2022 † indicates conference regular season champion * indicates conference tournament champion Rankings: USCHO.com Top 20 Poll; updated April 7, 2022

== Schedule and results ==
Date	Time	Opponent^{#}	Rank^{#}	Site	TV	Decision	Result	Attendance	Record
Regular season
October 8	7:00 PM	Mercyhurst*	#4	3M Arena at Mariucci • Minneapolis, MN	BSN+	LaFontaine	W 7–4	6,372	1–0–0
October 9	5:00 PM	Mercyhurst*	#4	3M Arena at Mariucci • Minneapolis, MN	BSN	LaFontaine	W 5–3	6,396	2–0–0
October 15	7:00 PM	#2 St. Cloud State*	#4	3M Arena at Mariucci • Minneapolis, MN	BSN	LaFontaine	L 1–2	8,190	2–1–0
October 16	5:07 PM	at #2 St. Cloud State*	#4	Herb Brooks National Hockey Center • St. Cloud, MN		LaFontaine	W 4–3 ^{OT}	5,596	3–1–0
October 22	7:00 PM	#5 Minnesota Duluth*	#4	3M Arena at Mariucci • Minneapolis, MN (Rivalry)	BSN	LaFontaine	L 3–5	9,016	3–2–0
October 23	7:07 PM	at #5 Minnesota Duluth*	#4	AMSOIL Arena • Duluth, MN (Rivalry)		LaFontaine	L 1–2	7,596	3–3–0
October 29	8:00 PM	#14 Notre Dame	#7	3M Arena at Mariucci • Minneapolis, MN	BTN	LaFontaine	W 4–1	6,744	4–3–0 (1–0–0)
October 30	5:00 PM	#14 Notre Dame	#7	3M Arena at Mariucci • Minneapolis, MN	BSN	LaFontaine	W 3–2	6,875	5–3–0 (2–0–0)
November 5	7:00 PM	at Wisconsin	#5	Kohl Center • Madison, WI (Rivalry)	BSW+, BSN+	LaFontaine	L 3–4 ^{OT}	9,813	5–4–0 (2–1–0)
November 6	8:00 PM	at Wisconsin	#5	Kohl Center • Madison, WI (Rivalry)	BSW, BSN+	LaFontaine	W 4–1	12,015	6–4–0 (3–1–0)
November 12	6:30 PM	#18 Ohio State	#6	3M Arena at Mariucci • Minneapolis, MN	BSN	LaFontaine	L 3–4	7,511	6–5–0 (3–2–0)
November 13	5:00 PM	#18 Ohio State	#6	3M Arena at Mariucci • Minneapolis, MN	BSN	LaFontaine	W 2–0	7,294	7–5–0 (4–2–0)
November 19	7:00 PM	Penn State	#7	3M Arena at Mariucci • Minneapolis, MN	BSN	LaFontaine	L 3–5	7,426	7–6–0 (4–3–0)
November 20	8:00 PM	Penn State	#7	3M Arena at Mariucci • Minneapolis, MN	BSN	LaFontaine	W 4–2	7,309	8–6–0 (5–3–0)
November 26	7:07 PM	at #6 North Dakota*	#11	Ralph Engelstad Arena • Grand Forks, ND (Rivalry)	Midco	LaFontaine	W 5–1	11,624	9–6–0
November 27	6:07 PM	at #6 North Dakota*	#11	Ralph Engelstad Arena • Grand Forks, ND (Rivalry)	Midco	LaFontaine	L 2–3	11,617	9–7–0
December 3	6:30 PM	#3 Michigan	#11	3M Arena at Mariucci • Minneapolis, MN (Rivalry)	BTN	LaFontaine	W 5–1	5,800	10–7–0 (6–3–0)
December 4	7:00 PM	#3 Michigan	#11	3M Arena at Mariucci • Minneapolis, MN (Rivalry)	BTN	LaFontaine	L 2–6	5,613	10–8–0 (6–4–0)
January 3	6:00 PM	USNTDP*	#9	3M Arena at Mariucci • Minneapolis, MN (Exhibition)			W 5–3		
January 7	6:30 PM	at Michigan State	#9	Munn Ice Arena • East Lansing, MI	BTN	LaFontaine	W 4–1	4,922	11–8–0 (7–4–0)
January 8	7:30 PM	at Michigan State	#9	Munn Ice Arena • East Lansing, MI	BTN	LaFontaine	W 6–3	5,209	12–8–0 (8–4–0)
January 14	6:00 PM	Alaska*	#8	3M Arena at Mariucci • Minneapolis, MN		Close	W 4–1	7,624	13–8–0
January 15	6:00 PM	Alaska*	#8	3M Arena at Mariucci • Minneapolis, MN		Close	L 2–3	8,083	13–9–0
January 21	8:00 PM	at #3 Michigan	#11	Yost Ice Arena • Ann Arbor, MI (Rivalry)	ESPNU	Close	W 2–1 ^{OT}	8,204	14–9–0 (9–4–0)
January 22	6:30 PM	at #3 Michigan	#11	Yost Ice Arena • Ann Arbor, MI (Rivalry)	BTN	Close	L 1–4	8,046	14–10–0 (9–5–0)
January 28	6:30 PM	at #11 Notre Dame	#10	Compton Family Ice Arena • Notre Dame, IN	Peacock	Close	W 5–1	4,711	15–10–0 (10–5–0)
January 29	5:00 PM	at #11 Notre Dame	#10	Compton Family Ice Arena • Notre Dame, IN	Peacock	Close	L 2–3 ^{OT}	4,632	15–11–0 (10–6–0)
February 4	7:00 PM	Michigan State	#8	3M Arena at Mariucci • Minneapolis, MN	BSN	Close	W 4–2	7,824	16–11–0 (11–6–0)
February 5	5:00 PM	Michigan State	#8	3M Arena at Mariucci • Minneapolis, MN	BSN	Close	W 3–1	8,305	17–11–0 (12–6–0)
February 11	5:30 PM	at #8 Ohio State	#7	Value City Arena • Columbus, OH	BTN	Close	W 3–2	6,008	18–11–0 (13–6–0)
February 12	5:00 PM	at #8 Ohio State	#7	Value City Arena • Columbus, OH	BTN	Close	W 5–1	6,208	19–11–0 (14–6–0)
February 18	5:30 PM	at Penn State	#5	Pegula Ice Arena • University Park, PA	BTN	Close	W 3–1	6,043	20–11–0 (15–6–0)
February 19	5:00 PM	at Penn State	#5	Pegula Ice Arena • University Park, PA	BTN	Close	W 6–4	6,216	21–11–0 (16–6–0)
February 25	8:00 PM	Wisconsin	#4	3M Arena at Mariucci • Minneapolis, MN (Rivalry)	ESPNU	Close	W 5–0	9,350	22–11–0 (17–6–0)
February 26	8:00 PM	Wisconsin	#4	3M Arena at Mariucci • Minneapolis, MN (Rivalry)	BTN	Close	W 8–0	10,069	23–11–0 (18–6–0)
Big Ten tournament
March 12	9:00 PM	Penn State*	#2	3M Arena at Mariucci • Minneapolis, MN (Semifinal)	BTN	Close	W 3–2	6,856	24–11–0
March 19	8:00 PM	#4 Michigan*	#2	3M Arena at Mariucci • Minneapolis, MN (Championship)	BTN	Close	L 3–4	10,774	24–12–0
NCAA tournament
March 25	5:00 PM	vs. #10 Massachusetts*	#5	DCU Center • Worcester, Massachusetts (Northeast Regional semifinal)	ESPNU	Close	W 4–3 ^{OT}	6,002	25–12–0
March 25	3:00 PM	vs. #4 Western Michigan*	#5	DCU Center • Worcester, Massachusetts (Northeast Regional final)	ESPN2	Close	W 3–0	2,848	26–12–0
April 7	8:30 PM	vs. #1 Minnesota State*	#5	TD Garden • Boston, Massachusetts (National semifinal)	ESPNU	Close	L 1–5	17,850	26–13–0
*Non-conference game. ^{#}Rankings from USCHO.com Poll. All times are in Central Time. Source:

== Scoring statistics ==
Name	Position	Games	Goals	Assists	Points	PIM
Ben Meyers	C/LW	34	17	24	41	16
Matthew Knies	C/LW	33	15	18	33	31
Blake McLaughlin	C/LW	39	13	20	33	35
Jackson LaCombe	D	39	3	27	30	12
Sammy Walker	C	39	14	13	27	20
Bryce Brodzinski	RW	39	12	14	26	10
Chaz Lucius	C	24	9	10	19	23
Ryan Johnson	D	39	3	16	19	14
Rhett Pitlick	LW	30	5	13	18	12
Aaron Huglen	C/W	37	7	9	16	14
Grant Cruikshank	C	33	7	8	15	0
Michael Koster	D	36	3	11	14	10
Brock Faber	D	32	2	12	14	12
Mason Nevers	C	38	6	7	13	0
Jack Perbix	D/RW	38	5	7	12	18
Tristan Broz	F	36	6	5	11	10
Jaxon Nelson	C	26	6	4	10	17
Ben Brinkman	D	37	1	7	8	23
Carl Fish	D	21	0	6	6	4
Jonathan Sorenson	F	37	4	0	4	4
Matt Staudacher	D	33	0	4	4	35
Sam Rossini	D	3	0	1	1	0
Colin Schmidt	C	10	0	1	1	0
Justen Close	G	21	0	1	1	0
Matt Denman	D	3	0	0	0	0
Jack LaFontaine	G	20	0	0	0	0
Total			138	238	376	322

== Goaltending statistics ==
Name	Games	Minutes	Wins	Losses	Ties	Goals against	Saves	Shut outs	SV %	GAA
Justen Close	21	1172	14	5	0	38	472	3	.925	1.95
Jack LaFontaine	20	1162	12	8	0	52	469	1	.900	2.69
Empty Net	-	20	-	-	-	1	-	-	-	-
Total	39	2353	26	13	0	91	941	4	.912	2.32

== Rankings ==
Poll	Week																									
Poll	Pre	1	2	3	4	5	6	7	8	9	10	11	12	13	14	15	16	17	18	19	20	21	22	23	24	25 (Final)
USCHO.com	4 (2)	4 (1)	4 (1)	4	7	5 (1)	6	7	11	11	10 (1)	11	9	8	11	10	8	7	5	4	2 (1)	2 (1)	2 (1)	5	-	4
USA Today	4 (7)	4 (3)	4	4	7	5 (1)	8	7	12	12	11 (1)	11	11	8	11	10	10	8	6	4	2 (2)	2	3	6	4	4

Note: USCHO did not release a poll in week 24.

== Awards and honors ==
Player	Award	Ref
Ben Meyers	AHCA All-American West Second Team	
Ben Meyers	Big Ten Player of the Year	
Brock Faber	Big Ten Defensive Player of the Year	
Bob Motzko	Big Ten Coach of the Year	
Brock Faber	Big Ten First Team	
Ben Meyers	Big Ten First Team	
Jackson LaCombe	Big Ten Second Team	
Matthew Knies	Big Ten Second Team	
Matthew Knies	Big Ten Rookie Team	
Jackson LaCombe	Big Ten All-Tournament Team	

== Players drafted into the NHL ==
=== 2022 NHL entry draft ===
Round	Pick	Player	NHL team
1	3	Logan Cooley^{†}	Arizona Coyotes
1	23	Jimmy Snuggerud^{†}	St. Louis Blues
1	25	Sam Rinzel^{†}	Chicago Blackhawks
2	37	Ryan Chesley^{†}	Washington Capitals
6	192	Connor Kurth^{†}	Tampa Bay Lightning

† incoming freshman
