= 2021–22 St. Cloud State Huskies men's ice hockey season =

NCAA tournament, Regional semifinal
- Conference: T–4th NCHC
- Home ice: Herb Brooks National Hockey Center

Rankings
- USCHO: #11
- USA Today: #11

Record
- Overall: 18–15–4
- Conference: 10–10–4
- Home: 11–5–3
- Road: 7–9–1
- Neutral: 0–1–0

Coaches and captains
- Head coach: Brett Larson
- Assistant coaches: Dave Shyiak; Nick Oliver; Matt Bertram
- Captain: Spencer Meier
- Alternate captain(s): Seamus Donohue; Kevin Fitzgerald; Luke Jaycox

The 2021–22 St. Cloud State Huskies men's ice hockey season was the 87th season of play for the program, the 25th at the Division I level and the 9th in the NCHC conference. The Huskies represented St. Cloud State University and were coached by Brett Larson, in his 4th season.

== Season ==
After reaching the championship game for the first time in program history, St. Cloud entered this season hoping to return and complete the job. The Huskies returned most of the men from the year before and lost none of the principle players, giving them a leg-up in the teamwork department. They retained the high ranking from the end of 2021 as they began the season and did so in tremendous fashion, scoring 12 goals in the season opener. While it did come against St. Thomas, a team that was playing its first game at the Division I level, it was still an impressive start. The second week could not have been a bigger contrast as the Huskies faced the #1 team in the nation, Minnesota State. St. Cloud acquitted itself well with a split, a feat that repeated the next week against #4 Minnesota. After a sweep of Wisconsin, St. Cloud found itself as the #1 ranked team and set about proving that they were worth of the honor.

A loss in mid-November caused the team to slip down to #2 but the Huskies took a bigger hit when they were swept by a surprising Western Michigan squad just before Thanksgiving. After following with another split, the Huskies fell out of the top-5 for the first time and entered the winter break with a solid but unspectacular record. St. Cloud was, however, the beneficiary of playing in the toughest conference in the nation. With their good non-conference mark, the team could afford a few losses and still earn a return to the national tournament.

After coming back with a sweep of Bemidji State, St. Cloud's season was put on hold due to positive COVID-19 tests that forced several games around the country to be delayed or cancelled. They didn't get back onto the ice until late-January and, though the Huskies played well in their return, the extra time off appeared to have taken the jam out of their game. St. Cloud went through a 6-game streak without a win and plummeted in the conference standings. Three ties during that run prevented them from falling out of postseason contention, but they found themselves on the edge by mid-February. A good weekend against WMU helped arrest their slide but they were back in trouble after losing two to Omaha.

The final five game of the Huskies season would make or break the team and 5th-year starter Dávid Hrenák came up huge. He sandwiched three stirling performances against Minnesota Duluth around a pair of wins that kept the team's head above water, making it all but certain that St. Cloud would receive an at-large bid regardless of what happened in the postseason. Unfortunately, as the Huskies were preparing for the conference quarterfinals, Hrenák came down with pneumonia and was unable to play. Backup Jaxon Castor had played decently in spots during the season, so there was hope that the team could play well enough defensively to insulate the understudy. That hope was banished by Duluth, who fired a total of 79 shots on goal in the two games, and scored 9 goals to knock St. Cloud out in the first round.

As was expected, however, St. Cloud State ended the season as #10 in the PairWise rankings and was guaranteed a spot in the tournament. With Hrenák on the mend, the team would need to put forth a better effort and give their starter the time he needed to return. In the opening game they faced the nation's top defensive team, Quinnipiac. The Huskies got behind early, allowing two goals in the first, but then responded by completely outplaying the Bobcats in the final 40 minutes. St. Cloud scored three times in the second, tying the game on two separate occasions, and limited their opponents to just 16 shots on goal. Senior Nolan Walker led the way with a 3-point night as the team scored four goals against Quinnipiac, the most they had allowed all season. Unfortunately, Castor did not play well in goal. He was beaten on 5 of the shots he faced and St. Cloud's season ended in heartbreaking fashion.

== Departures ==
Player	Position	Nationality	Cause
Tyler Anderson	Defenseman	Canada	Graduate transfer to Manitoba
Jared Cockrell	Forward	United States	Graduation (signed with Wheeling Nailers)
Will Hammer	Forward	United States	Graduation (retired)
Trevor Zins	Defenseman	United States	Transfer to St. Thomas

== Recruiting ==
Player	Position	Nationality	Age	Notes
Josh Luedtke	Defenseman	United States	21	Minnetonka, MN
Jack Peart	Defenseman	United States	18	Grand Rapids, MN; selected 54th overall in 2021
Ryan Rosborough	Forward	Canada	21	Mount Brydges, ON
Mason Salquist	Forward	United States	21	Grand Forks, ND
Aidan Spellacy	Forward	United States	23	Lakewood, OH; transfer from Robert Morris

== Roster ==
As of August 30, 2021.

No.	Nat.	Player	Class	Pos	Height	Weight	DoB	Hometown	Previous team	NHL rights
2	(United States)	Brady Ziemer	Sophomore	D	5' 10" (1.78 m)	180 lb (82 kg)	2000-05-24	Carver, Minnesota	Green Bay Gamblers (USHL)	—
3	(United States)	Seamus Donohue (A)	Graduate	F	6' 0" (1.83 m)	190 lb (86 kg)	1996-06-01	North Oaks, Minnesota	Michigan Tech (WCHA)	—
5	(Czech Republic)	Ondřej Trejbal	Junior	D	6' 3" (1.91 m)	185 lb (84 kg)	1999-04-21	Hamry nad Sázavou, Czech Republic	Minnesota Wilderness (NAHL)	—
6	(United States)	Luke Jaycox (A)	Graduate	D	6' 3" (1.91 m)	205 lb (93 kg)	1997-08-19	Warroad, Minnesota	Lincoln Stars (USHL)	—
7	(United States)	Jack Johnston	Sophomore	F	5' 10" (1.78 m)	170 lb (77 kg)	1999-06-29	St. Paul, Minnesota	Fairbanks Ice Dogs (NAHL)	—
8	(United States)	Aidan Spellacy	Senior	F	5' 11" (1.8 m)	175 lb (79 kg)	1998-06-13	Lakewood, Ohio	Robert Morris (AHA)	—
9	(United States)	Spencer Meier (C)	Senior	D	6' 4" (1.93 m)	212 lb (96 kg)	1999-04-15	Sartell, Minnesota	Fargo Force (USHL)	—
10	(Canada)	Kyler Kupka	Junior	F	6' 0" (1.83 m)	185 lb (84 kg)	1999-05-11	Camrose, Alberta	Camrose Kodiaks (AJHL)	—
12	(Canada)	Ryan Rosborough	Freshman	F	6' 3" (1.91 m)	190 lb (86 kg)	2000-05-24	Mt. Brydges, Ontario	South Shore Kings (NCDC)	—
13	(Finland)	Jami Krannila	Junior	F	5' 10" (1.78 m)	165 lb (75 kg)	2000-10-03	Nokia, Finland	Sioux Falls Stampede (USHL)	—
14	(Canada)	Zach Okabe	Junior	F	5' 9" (1.75 m)	170 lb (77 kg)	2001-01-04	Okotoks, Alberta	Grande Prairie Storm (AJHL)	—
15	(United States)	Micah Miller	Senior	F	5' 9" (1.75 m)	200 lb (91 kg)	1998-10-29	Grand Rapids, Minnesota	Sioux City Musketeers (USHL)	—
16	(United States)	Mason Salquist	Freshman	F	5' 8" (1.73 m)	165 lb (75 kg)	2000-03-21	Grand Forks, North Dakota	Fargo Force (USHL)	—
17	(United States)	Thomas Rocco	Junior	F	5' 10" (1.78 m)	160 lb (73 kg)	1999-11-04	Midlothian, Virginia	Aberdeen Wings (NAHL)	—
18	(United States)	Brendan Bushy	Senior	D	6' 2" (1.88 m)	230 lb (104 kg)	1998-08-23	Thief River Falls, Minnesota	Dubuque Fighting Saints (USHL)	—
19	(United States)	Sam Hentges	Senior	F	6' 0" (1.83 m)	190 lb (86 kg)	1999-07-26	New Brighton, Minnesota	Tri-City Storm (USHL)	MIN, 210th overall 2018
20	(United States)	Nolan Walker	Senior	F	5' 10" (1.78 m)	170 lb (77 kg)	1998-10-20	Anchorage, Alaska	Sioux Falls Stampede (USHL)	—
21	(United States)	Josh Luedtke	Freshman	D	5' 9" (1.75 m)	175 lb (79 kg)	2000-09-29	Minnetonka, Minnesota	Des Moines Buccaneers (USHL)	—
22	(United States)	Joe Molenaar	Sophomore	F	6' 1" (1.85 m)	175 lb (79 kg)	1999-10-16	Minnetonka, Minnesota	Cedar Rapids RoughRiders (USHL)	—
23	(United States)	Jack Peart	Freshman	D	5' 11" (1.8 m)	175 lb (79 kg)	2003-05-15	Grand Rapids, Minnesota	Grand Rapids High School (USHS–MN)	MIN, 54th overall 2021
25	(United States)	Nick Perbix	Senior	D	6' 4" (1.93 m)	200 lb (91 kg)	1998-06-15	Elk River, Minnesota	Omaha Lancers (USHL)	TBL, 169th overall 2017
26	(United States)	Easton Brodzinski	Graduate	F	6' 2" (1.88 m)	198 lb (90 kg)	1996-08-13	Blaine, Minnesota	Green Bay Gamblers (USHL)	—
27	(United States)	Chase Brand	Junior	F	5' 10" (1.78 m)	165 lb (75 kg)	1999-02-25	Nevis, Minnesota	Madison Capitols (USHL)	—
28	(United States)	Kevin Fitzgerald (A)	Graduate	F	6' 0" (1.83 m)	175 lb (79 kg)	1996-07-31	Hinsdale, Illinois	Aberdeen Wings (NAHL)	—
29	(Finland)	Veeti Miettinen	Sophomore	F	5' 9" (1.75 m)	160 lb (73 kg)	2001-09-20	Espoo, Finland	Kiekko-Espoo (Nuorten SM-liiga)	TOR, 168th overall 2020
30	(United States)	Joey Lamoreaux	Junior	G	6' 1" (1.85 m)	180 lb (82 kg)	1999-02-01	Shorewood, Wisconsin	Madison Capitols (USHL)	—
34	(Slovakia)	Dávid Hrenák	Graduate	G	6' 2" (1.88 m)	180 lb (82 kg)	1998-05-05	Považska Bystrica, Slovakia	Green Bay Gamblers (USHL)	LAK, 144th overall 2018
40	(United States)	Jaxon Castor	Junior	G	6' 3" (1.91 m)	200 lb (91 kg)	1997-03-14	Phoenix, Arizona	Shreveport Mudbugs (NAHL)	—

== Standings ==
2021–22 National Collegiate Hockey Conference Standings
	Conference record										Overall record					
	GP	W	L	T	OTW	OTL	3/SW	PTS	GF	GA	GP	W	L	T	GF	GA
#1 Denver †	24	18	6	0	1	0	0	53	98	55	41	31	9	1	175	93
#9 North Dakota †	24	17	6	1	1	1	1	53	78	58	39	24	14	1	119	99
#6 Western Michigan	24	14	9	1	1	0	1	43	84	68	39	26	12	1	138	101
#11 St. Cloud State	24	10	10	4	1	2	1	36	84	69	37	18	15	4	133	97
#5 Minnesota Duluth *	24	10	10	4	1	1	2	36	61	56	42	22	16	4	109	93
Omaha	24	11	13	0	2	1	0	32	65	74	38	21	17	0	123	102
Colorado College	24	6	17	1	2	1	0	18	48	87	36	9	24	3	79	116
Miami	24	4	19	1	0	3	1	17	54	105	36	7	27	2	94	153
Championship: March 19, 2022 † indicates conference regular season champion (Penrose Cup) * indicates conference tournament champion (Frozen Faceoff Championship Trophy); Rankings: USCHO.com Top 20 Poll

== Schedule and results ==
Date	Time	Opponent^{#}	Rank^{#}	Site	TV	Decision	Result	Attendance	Record
Regular season
October 2	6:07 PM	St. Thomas*	#2	Herb Brooks National Hockey Center • St. Cloud, Minnesota		Hrenák	W 12–2	4,151	1–0–0
October 3	4:37 PM	at St. Thomas*	#2	St. Thomas Ice Arena • Mendota Heights, Minnesota		Hrenák	W 2–0	4,261	2–0–0
October 8	7:07 PM	at #1 Minnesota State*	#2	Mayo Clinic Health System Event Center • Mankato, Minnesota	Spectrum 191	Hrenák	L 0–1	4,555	2–1–0
October 9	6:07 PM	at #1 Minnesota State*	#2	Mayo Clinic Health System Event Center • Mankato, Minnesota	Spectrum 191	Hrenák	W 3–1	4,838	3–1–0
October 15	7:00 PM	at #4 Minnesota*	#2	3M Arena at Mariucci • Minneapolis, Minnesota	BSN	Hrenák	W 2–1	8,190	4–1–0
October 16	5:07 PM	#4 Minnesota*	#2	Herb Brooks National Hockey Center • St. Cloud, Minnesota		Hrenák	L 3–4 ^{OT}	5,596	4–2–0
October 22	7:37 PM	Wisconsin*	#3	Herb Brooks National Hockey Center • St. Cloud, Minnesota		Hrenák	W 5–1	3,774	5–2–0
October 23	6:07 PM	Wisconsin*	#3	Herb Brooks National Hockey Center • St. Cloud, Minnesota		Castor	W 4–1	4,165	6–2–0
November 5	8:07 PM	at Colorado College	#1	Ed Robson Arena • Colorado Springs, Colorado	ATTRM	Hrenák	W 3–2 ^{OT}	3,566	7–2–0 (1–0–0)
November 6	6:07 PM	at Colorado College	#1	Ed Robson Arena • Colorado Springs, Colorado		Hrenák	W 4–1	3,579	8–2–0 (2–0–0)
November 12	7:37 PM	#11 Omaha	#1	Herb Brooks National Hockey Center • St. Cloud, Minnesota		Hrenák	W 5–1	3,825	9–2–0 (3–0–0)
November 13	6:07 PM	#11 Omaha	#1	Herb Brooks National Hockey Center • St. Cloud, Minnesota		Hrenák	L 2–3 ^{OT}	0	9–3–0 (3–1–0)
November 19	6:05 PM	at #13 Western Michigan	#2	Lawson Arena • Kalamazoo, Michigan		Hrenák	L 2–6	3,369	9–4–0 (3–2–0)
November 20	6:05 PM	at #13 Western Michigan	#2	Lawson Arena • Kalamazoo, Michigan		Castor	L 0–4	3,669	9–5–0 (3–3–0)
December 3	7:37 PM	#7 North Dakota	#5	Herb Brooks National Hockey Center • St. Cloud, Minnesota		Hrenák	W 8–1	4,703	10–5–0 (4–3–0)
December 4	6:07 PM	#7 North Dakota	#5	Herb Brooks National Hockey Center • St. Cloud, Minnesota		Hrenák	L 3–5	5,224	10–6–0 (4–4–0)
December 31	6:07 PM	at Bemidji State*	#7	Sanford Center • Bemidji, Minnesota		Hrenák	W 4–1	3,433	11–6–0
January 1	6:07 PM	Bemidji State*	#7	Herb Brooks National Hockey Center • St. Cloud, Minnesota	Fox9+	Castor	W 5–2	4,634	12–6–0
January 21	7:37 PM	Miami	#6	Herb Brooks National Hockey Center • St. Cloud, Minnesota		Hrenák	W 11–1	3,740	13–6–0 (5–4–0)
January 22	6:07 PM	Miami	#6	Herb Brooks National Hockey Center • St. Cloud, Minnesota		Hrenák	W 8–0	4,107	14–6–0 (6–4–0)
January 28	7:07 PM	at #13 North Dakota	#6	Ralph Engelstad Arena • Grand Forks, North Dakota		Hrenák	L 1–7	11,417	14–7–0 (6–5–0)
January 29	6:07 PM	at #13 North Dakota	#6	Ralph Engelstad Arena • Grand Forks, North Dakota		Hrenák	T 3–3 ^{SOL}	11,876	14–7–1 (6–5–1)
February 4	8:00 PM	at #4 Denver	#7	Magness Arena • Denver, Colorado		Hrenák	L 5–8	4,661	14–8–1 (6–6–1)
February 5	7:00 PM	at #4 Denver	#7	Magness Arena • Denver, Colorado		Hrenák	L 0–2	5,375	14–9–1 (6–7–1)
February 8	6:00 PM	#6 Minnesota Duluth	#10	Herb Brooks National Hockey Center • St. Cloud, Minnesota		Hrenák	T 2–2 ^{SOW}	3,842	14–9–2 (6–7–2)
February 11	7:30 PM	#5 Western Michigan	#10	Herb Brooks National Hockey Center • St. Cloud, Minnesota		Hrenák	T 5–5 ^{SOL}	3,627	14–9–3 (6–7–3)
February 12	6:00 PM	#5 Western Michigan	#10	Herb Brooks National Hockey Center • St. Cloud, Minnesota		Hrenák	W 4–1	4,567	15–9–3 (7–7–3)
February 18	7:00 PM	at Omaha	#8	Baxter Arena • Omaha, Nebraska		Hrenák	L 2–5	5,011	15–10–3 (7–8–3)
February 19	7:00 PM	at Omaha	#8	Baxter Arena • Omaha, Nebraska		Hrenák	L 1–5	5,454	15–11–3 (7–9–3)
February 22	6:00 PM	#8 Minnesota Duluth	#11	Herb Brooks National Hockey Center • St. Cloud, Minnesota		Hrenák	T 1–1 ^{SOL}	4,230	15–11–4 (7–9–4)
February 25	7:30 PM	Colorado College	#11	Herb Brooks National Hockey Center • St. Cloud, Minnesota		Hrenák	W 4–1	3,857	16–11–4 (8–9–4)
February 26	6:00 PM	Colorado College	#11	Herb Brooks National Hockey Center • St. Cloud, Minnesota		Hrenák	W 6–2	5,128	17–11–4 (9–9–4)
March 4	7:30 PM	at #11 Minnesota Duluth	#10	AMSOIL Arena • Duluth, Minnesota	CBSSN	Hrenák	L 2–3	5,582	17–12–4 (9–10–4)
March 5	7:00 PM	at #11 Minnesota Duluth	#10	AMSOIL Arena • Duluth, Minnesota		Hrenák	W 2–0	5,791	18–12–4 (10–10–4)
NCHC Tournament
March 11	7:07 PM	#10 Minnesota Duluth*	#9	Herb Brooks National Hockey Center • St. Cloud, Minnesota (Quarterfinal Game 1)		Castor	L 2–5	2,594	18–13–4
March 12	6:07 PM	#10 Minnesota Duluth*	#9	Herb Brooks National Hockey Center • St. Cloud, Minnesota (Quarterfinal Game 2)		Castor	L 3–4 ^{OT}	3,227	18–14–4
St. Cloud State Lost Series 0–2
NCAA Tournament
March 25	7:00 PM	vs. #8 Quinnipiac*	#11	PPL Center • Allentown, Pennsylvania (Midwest Regional semifinal)	ESPNews	Castor	L 4–5	2,155	18–15–4
*Non-conference game. ^{#}Rankings from USCHO.com Poll. All times are in Central Time. Source:

== Scoring statistics ==
Name	Position	Games	Goals	Assists	Points	PIM
Kevin Fitzgerald	C	37	17	19	36	22
Nick Perbix	D	31	6	25	31	14
Jami Krannila	F	37	15	15	30	40
Zach Okabe	RW	37	11	17	28	14
Easton Brodzinski	RW	36	12	15	27	72
Nolan Walker	C	37	11	13	24	26
Veeti Miettinen	RW	37	10	13	23	0
Sam Hentges	C/LW	20	12	10	22	19
Micah Miller	C/RW	37	10	9	19	6
Spencer Meier	D	36	5	13	18	6
Kyler Kupka	F	37	5	13	18	6
Jack Peart	D	32	2	15	17	24
Seamus Donohue	D	35	1	15	16	30
Ondřej Trejbal	D	31	2	9	11	8
Josh Luedtke	D	33	3	6	9	16
Joe Molenaar	F	33	5	3	8	19
Mason Salquist	F	34	3	4	7	4
Chase Brand	C	35	2	5	7	4
Brendan Bushy	D	36	1	5	6	21
Brady Ziemer	D	12	0	2	2	4
Dávid Hrenák	G	31	0	2	2	0
Luke Jaycox	D	13	0	1	1	10
Aidan Spellacy	F	19	0	1	1	4
Joseph Lamoreaux	G	2	0	0	0	0
Thomas Rocco	F	7	0	0	0	0
Jaxon Castor	G	9	0	0	0	0
Bench	-	-	-	-	-	8
Total			133	230	363	377

== Goaltending statistics ==
Name	Games	Minutes	Wins	Losses	Ties	Goals against	Saves	Shut outs	SV %	GAA
Dávid Hrenák	31	1755	16	11	4	66	704	3	.914	2.26
Joey Lamoreaux	2	24	0	0	0	1	18	0	.947	2.52
Jaxon Castor	9	449	2	4	0	24	195	0	.890	3.21
Empty Net	-	30	-	-	-	6	-	-	-	-
Total	37	2258	18	15	4	97	917	3	.904	2.58

== Rankings ==
Poll	Week																									
Poll	Pre	1	2	3	4	5	6	7	8	9	10	11	12	13	14	15	16	17	18	19	20	21	22	23	24	25 (Final)
USCHO.com	2 (13)	2 (18)	2 (14)	3 (1)	1 (22)	1 (29)	1 (42)	2 (4)	5	5	6	7 (1)	4	5	6	6	7	10	8	11	10	9	12	11	-	11
USA Today	3 (2)	1 (16)	2 (11)	3	1 (17)	1 (21)	1 (30)	2 (4)	6	6	6	7	4	4	5	6	6	10	8	11	11	9	10	11	11	11

Note: USCHO did not release a poll in week 24.

== Awards and honors ==
Player	Award	Ref
Nick Perbix	NCHC First Team	
Kevin Fitzgerald	NCHC Second Team	

== Players drafted into the NHL ==
=== 2022 NHL entry draft ===
Round	Pick	Player	NHL team
3	82	Adam Ingram^{†}	Nashville Predators
6	164	Barrett Hall^{†}	Seattle Kraken

† incoming freshman
