= 2021–22 Minnesota Duluth Bulldogs men's ice hockey season =

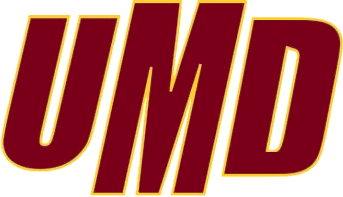

NCHC Tournament, Champion NCAA tournament, Regional final
- Conference: T–4th NCHC
- Home ice: AMSOIL Arena

Rankings
- USCHO: #5
- USA Today: #5

Record
- Overall: 22–16–4
- Conference: 10–10–4
- Home: 10–7–2
- Road: 9–8–2
- Neutral: 3–1–0

Coaches and captains
- Head coach: Scott Sandelin
- Assistant coaches: Derek Plante; Adam Krause; Brant Nicklin
- Captain: Noah Cates
- Alternate captain: Louie Roehl

The 2021–22 Minnesota Duluth Bulldogs men's ice hockey season was the 78th season of play for the program. They represented the University of Minnesota Duluth in the 2021–22 NCAA Division I men's ice hockey season and for the 9th season in the National Collegiate Hockey Conference (NCHC). The Bulldogs were coached by Scott Sandelin, in his 22nd season, and played their home games at AMSOIL Arena.

== Season ==
Fresh off of their 4th consecutive frozen four, Minnesota Duluth entered the season as one of the favorites for the National Championship. Early on, the team lived up to expectations and compiled a 6–2 record by early November with all of their games coming against ranked teams. Leading the way was junior netminder, Ryan Fanti, who had taken over the starting role the year before and seemed to be performing even better. He rang up three consecutive shutouts with the help of a lock-down defense and led the Bulldogs to a #1 ranking by the beginning of December.

Fanti's turn in goal was interrupted when he tested positive for COVID-19 and was forced to sit out a road series against Northern Michigan. With nominal backup Zach Stejskal undergoing treatment for testicular cancer, the team turned to their third goalie, Ben Patt. The redshirt senior's first career starts turned out poorly and he allowed 5 goals in both games. The losses sent UMD tumbling from the top of the national rankings and began a stretch of poor performances from the club.

Duluth got Fanti back in goal the following week and earned a split with Denver but then took a couple of weeks off for the winter break. Upon their return, the Bulldogs faced down the team that had replaced them as the #1 squad, Minnesota State. The Mavericks swept UMD in the home-and-home series, demonstrating that the Bulldogs' biggest weakness was their lack of offensive punch. The week after, the entire program was hit by COVID-19 and a series with St. Cloud State was postponed until later in the season. When the team finally got back into their routine, they were inconsistent and played .500 hockey over the next month.

Though the results weren't sterling, Minnesota Duluth benefitted from their difficult schedule and still remained well within the top-10. However, a sweep at the hands of North Dakota in mid-February put the team in a precarious position. After the losses, UMD's record stood at just 2 games over .500 and a poor performance over the remainder of their season could knock them out of the NCAA tournament. The Bulldogs split their final five games of the season, dropping the team to #10 in the rankings. While their collective heads were still above water, the Bulldogs had little margin for error and would need to defeat St. Cloud State to ensure a place in the national tournament.

=== NCHC Tournament ===
Before postseason play even began, Duluth got a leg-up on their competition when St. Cloud's starter, Dávid Hrenák, came down with pneumonia. Fanti did not play at his best but the Bulldogs' offense was able to light up the Huskies' backup and scored 9 goals in two games, their best output all season. Beginning with the semifinals, the defense returned to their early-season form and dominated the rest of the tournament. UMD shut down two of the nations top offenses and captured the program's third NCHC championship. The win pushed Minnesota Duluth up to 6 in the rankings, good enough for a #2 seed in the NCAA tournament.

=== NCAA tournament ===
The Bulldogs began their run against Michigan Tech and received a boon early in the game. The Huskies' leading scorer, Brian Halonen, was called for boarding and received a controversial game-misconduct penalty. Without their top offensive threat, Tech was unable to generate much in the way of offensive chances for a majority of the game. UMD scored three unassisted goals in the game, two coming from Kobe Roth, and skated to a comfortable 3–0 victory.

UMD faced down Denver in the quarterfinals and were on the back foot almost from the start of the game. The defense did its best impression of a wall and held the Pioneers back. Duluth managed to score first on just their second shot of the period and looked to be gearing up for a 4th-consecutive shutout. Unfortunately, Fanti's streak was ended a few minutes later after a shot was deflected into the cage. Denver remained the better of the two teams for the balance of the match and stopped Duluth from gaining the lead a second time, despite the Bulldogs receiving a 5-on-3 power play in the second period. In the end it took a crazy series of bounces for the winning goal to be scored but it was Duluth that fell victim to their own mediocre offense.

== Departures ==
| Player | Position | Nationality | Cause |
|---|---|---|---|
| Matthew Cairns | Defenseman | Canada | Graduation (signed with Rochester Americans) |
| Jackson Cates | Forward | United States | Signed professional contract (Philadelphia Flyers) |
| Cole Koepke | Forward | United States | Signed professional contract (Tampa Bay Lightning) |
| Brady Meyer | Forward | United States | Left Program (retired) |
| Nick Swaney | Forward | United States | Graduation (signed with Minnesota Wild) |

== Recruiting ==
| Player | Position | Nationality | Age | Notes |
|---|---|---|---|---|
| Will Francis | Defenseman | United States | 20 | Saint Paul, MN; selected 163rd overall in 2019 |
| Owen Gallatin | Defenseman | United States | 19 | Hugo, MN |
| Casey Gilling | Forward | United States | 23 | Gaylord, MI; graduate transfer from Miami |
| Dominic James | Forward | United States | 19 | Plymouth, MI |
| Kyler Kleven | Forward | United States | 20 | Moorhead, MN |
| Carter Loney | Forward | United States | 19 | Columbus, OH |

== Roster ==
As of August 19, 2021.

| No. | Nat. | Player | Class | Pos | Height | Weight | DoB | Hometown | Previous team | NHL rights |
|---|---|---|---|---|---|---|---|---|---|---|
| 2 | (United States) | Darian Gotz | Sophomore | D | 5' 11" (1.8 m) | 189 lb (86 kg) | 2000-10-19 | Hermantown, Minnesota | Cedar Rapids (USHL) | — |
| 3 | (United States) | Matt Anderson | Graduate | D | 6' 0" (1.83 m) | 195 lb (88 kg) | 1999-04-11 | Shakopee, Minnesota | Holy Family (USHS–MN) | — |
| 5 | (United States) | Wyatt Kaiser | Sophomore | D | 6' 0" (1.83 m) | 173 lb (78 kg) | 2002-07-31 | Ham Lake, Minnesota | Andover (USHS–MN) | CHI, 81st overall 2020 |
| 6 | (United States) | Louie Roehl (A) | Graduate | D | 5' 10" (1.78 m) | 185 lb (84 kg) | 1998-04-09 | Eden Prairie, Minnesota | Minnesota Wilderness (NAHL) | — |
| 7 | (United States) | Blake Biondi | Sophomore | F | 6' 0" (1.83 m) | 181 lb (82 kg) | 2002-04-24 | Hermantown, Minnesota | Hermantown (USHS–MN) | MTL, 109th overall 2020 |
| 8 | (United States) | Hunter Lellig | Senior | D | 6' 2" (1.88 m) | 195 lb (88 kg) | 1999-02-08 | Waterloo, Iowa | Waterloo (USHL) | — |
| 10 | (United States) | Kobe Roth | Graduate | F | 5' 9" (1.75 m) | 175 lb (79 kg) | 1997-01-11 | Warroad, Minnesota | Des Moines (USHL) | — |
| 11 | (United States) | Koby Bender | Graduate | F | 6' 1" (1.85 m) | 200 lb (91 kg) | 1997-07-15 | Cloquet, Minnesota | Muskegon (USHL) | — |
| 12 | (United States) | Ben Almquist | Junior | F | 6' 0" (1.83 m) | 185 lb (84 kg) | 1999-10-01 | Victoria, Minnesota | Austin (NAHL) | — |
| 13 | (Canada) | Tanner Laderoute | Senior | F | 6' 0" (1.83 m) | 190 lb (86 kg) | 1997-06-04 | Edmonton, Alberta | Okotoks (AJHL) | — |
| 15 | (Canada) | Quinn Olson | Junior | F | 5' 11" (1.8 m) | 170 lb (77 kg) | 2001-05-09 | Calgary, Alberta | Okotoks (AJHL) | BOS, 92nd overall 2019 |
| 16 | (United States) | Luke Loheit | Junior | F | 6' 1" (1.85 m) | 195 lb (88 kg) | 2000-07-26 | Minnetonka, Minnesota | Penticton (BCHL) | OTT, 194th overall 2018 |
| 17 | (United States) | Dominic James | Freshman | F | 5' 11" (1.8 m) | 166 lb (75 kg) | 2002-07-03 | Plymouth, Michigan | Lincoln (USHL) | — |
| 18 | (United States) | Jesse Jacques | Senior | F | 6' 1" (1.85 m) | 195 lb (88 kg) | 1998-09-10 | Hermantown, Minnesota | Green Bay (USHL) | — |
| 19 | (United States) | Jarrett Lee | Senior | F | 5' 10" (1.78 m) | 154 lb (70 kg) | 1999-06-04 | Hibbing, Minnesota | Green Bay (USHL) | — |
| 20 | (United States) | Owen Gallatin | Freshman | D | 5' 8" (1.73 m) | 171 lb (78 kg) | 2002-06-17 | White Bear Lake, Minnesota | Fargo (USHL) | — |
| 21 | (United States) | Noah Cates (C) | Senior | F | 6' 2" (1.88 m) | 190 lb (86 kg) | 1999-02-05 | Stillwater, Minnesota | Omaha (USHL) | PHI, 137th overall 2017 |
| 22 | (United States) | Kyler Kleven | Freshman | F | 6' 0" (1.83 m) | 170 lb (77 kg) | 2000-10-12 | Moorhead, Minnesota | Waterloo (USHL) | — |
| 23 | (United States) | Will Francis | Freshman | D | 6' 5" (1.96 m) | 211 lb (96 kg) | 2000-11-16 | St. Paul, Minnesota | Cedar Rapids (USHL) | ANA, 163rd overall 2019 |
| 24 | (United States) | Luke Mylymok | Sophomore | F | 5' 11" (1.8 m) | 183 lb (83 kg) | 2001-09-29 | Boise, Idaho | Salmon Arm (BCHL) | — |
| 25 | (United States) | Connor Kelley | Sophomore | D | 6' 1" (1.85 m) | 190 lb (86 kg) | 2002-01-30 | Maple Grove, Minnesota | USNTDP (USHL) | CHI, 204th overall 2021 |
| 27 | (United States) | Jake Rosenbaum | Senior | D | 6' 0" (1.83 m) | 190 lb (86 kg) | 1997-03-28 | Trabuco Canyon, California | Minot (NAHL) | — |
| 33 | (United States) | Carter Loney | Freshman | F | 5' 10" (1.78 m) | 161 lb (73 kg) | 2002-08-02 | Columbus, Ohio | Sioux City (USHL) | — |
| 35 | (United States) | Zach Stejskal | Sophomore | G | 6' 4" (1.93 m) | 215 lb (98 kg) | 1999-12-20 | Cohasset, Minnesota | Wilkes-Barre/Scranton (NAHL) | — |
| 36 | (Canada) | Ben Patt | Senior (RS) | G | 5' 11" (1.8 m) | 180 lb (82 kg) | 1996-05-19 | Brampton, Ontario | Notre Dame (SJHL) | — |
| 37 | (United States) | Casey Gilling | Graduate | F | 6' 0" (1.83 m) | 185 lb (84 kg) | 1998-03-25 | Gaylord, Michigan | Miami (NCHC) | — |
| 39 | (Canada) | Ryan Fanti | Junior | G | 6' 3" (1.91 m) | 195 lb (88 kg) | 1999-10-03 | Thunder Bay, Ontario | Minnesota Wilderness (NAHL) | — |

== Standings ==
2021–22 National Collegiate Hockey Conference Standings
| | Conference record | | | | | | | | | | Overall record | | | | | |
| | GP | W | L | T | OTW | OTL | 3/SW | PTS | GF | GA | GP | W | L | T | GF | GA |
|---|---|---|---|---|---|---|---|---|---|---|---|---|---|---|---|---|
| #1 Denver † | 24 | 18 | 6 | 0 | 1 | 0 | 0 | 53 | 98 | 55 | 41 | 31 | 9 | 1 | 175 | 93 |
| #9 North Dakota † | 24 | 17 | 6 | 1 | 1 | 1 | 1 | 53 | 78 | 58 | 39 | 24 | 14 | 1 | 119 | 99 |
| #6 Western Michigan | 24 | 14 | 9 | 1 | 1 | 0 | 1 | 43 | 84 | 68 | 39 | 26 | 12 | 1 | 138 | 101 |
| #11 St. Cloud State | 24 | 10 | 10 | 4 | 1 | 2 | 1 | 36 | 84 | 69 | 37 | 18 | 15 | 4 | 133 | 97 |
| #5 Minnesota Duluth * | 24 | 10 | 10 | 4 | 1 | 1 | 2 | 36 | 61 | 56 | 42 | 22 | 16 | 4 | 109 | 93 |
| Omaha | 24 | 11 | 13 | 0 | 2 | 1 | 0 | 32 | 65 | 74 | 38 | 21 | 17 | 0 | 123 | 102 |
| Colorado College | 24 | 6 | 17 | 1 | 2 | 1 | 0 | 18 | 48 | 87 | 36 | 9 | 24 | 3 | 79 | 116 |
| Miami | 24 | 4 | 19 | 1 | 0 | 3 | 1 | 17 | 54 | 105 | 36 | 7 | 27 | 2 | 94 | 153 |
Championship: March 19, 2022 † indicates conference regular season champion (Penrose Cup) * indicates conference tournament champion (Frozen Faceoff Championship Trophy); Rankings: USCHO.com Top 20 Poll

== Schedule and results ==
| Date | Time | Opponent^{#} | Rank^{#} | Site | TV | Decision | Result | Attendance | Record |
Exhibition
| October 3 | 1:00 PM | at #11 Wisconsin* | #6 | Kohl Center • Madison, WI (Exhibition) | | | W 4–2 | | |
Regular season
| October 8 | 7:07 PM | at #15 Bemidji State* | #5 | Sanford Center • Bemidji, Minnesota | | Stejskal | W 4–2 | 3,436 | 1–0–0 |
| October 9 | 7:07 PM | #15 Bemidji State* | #5 | AMSOIL Arena • Duluth, Minnesota | My9 | Fanti | W 2–1 | 5,374 | 2–0–0 |
Ice Breaker Tournament
| October 15 | 7:35 PM | #3 Michigan* | #5 | AMSOIL Arena • Duluth, Minnesota (Ice Breaker Semifinal) | | Stejskal | L 1–5 | 5,940 | 2–1–0 |
| October 16 | 7:37 PM | #10 Providence* | #5 | AMSOIL Arena • Duluth, Minnesota (Ice Breaker Consolation) | | Fanti | W 3–2 | 5,738 | 3–1–0 |
Regular season
| October 22 | 7:00 PM | at #4 Minnesota* | #5 | 3M Arena at Mariucci • Minneapolis, Minnesota | BSN | Fanti | W 5–3 | 9,016 | 4–1–0 |
| October 23 | 7:07 PM | #4 Minnesota* | #5 | AMSOIL Arena • Duluth, Minnesota | | Fanti | W 2–1 | 7,596 | 5–1–0 |
| November 5 | 6:05 PM | at #10 Western Michigan | #4 | Lawson Arena • Kalamazoo, Michigan | | Fanti | L 3–4 | 3,569 | 5–2–0 (0–1–0) |
| November 6 | 6:05 PM | at #10 Western Michigan | #4 | Lawson Arena • Kalamazoo, Michigan | | Fanti | W 3–0 | 3,781 | 6–2–0 (1–1–0) |
| November 12 | 7:07 PM | Colorado College | #4 | AMSOIL Arena • Duluth, Minnesota | ATTRM | Fanti | W 5–0 | 5,985 | 7–2–0 (2–1–0) |
| November 13 | 7:07 PM | Colorado College | #4 | AMSOIL Arena • Duluth, Minnesota | | Fanti | T 0–0 ^{SOW} | 6,435 | 7–2–1 (2–1–1) |
| November 19 | 7:07 PM | at #6 North Dakota | #4 | Ralph Engelstad Arena • Grand Forks, North Dakota | | Fanti | W 4–1 | 11,686 | 8–2–1 (3–1–1) |
| November 20 | 6:07 PM | at #6 North Dakota | #4 | Ralph Engelstad Arena • Grand Forks, North Dakota | | Fanti | L 1–2 | 11,858 | 8–3–1 (3–2–1) |
| November 26 | 7:07 PM | Alaska* | #2 | AMSOIL Arena • Duluth, Minnesota | | Fanti | W 5–1 | 5,012 | 9–3–1 |
| November 27 | 7:07 PM | Alaska* | #2 | AMSOIL Arena • Duluth, Minnesota | | Fanti | W 1–0 ^{OT} | 4,786 | 10–3–1 |
| December 3 | 6:37 PM | at Northern Michigan* | #1 | Berry Events Center • Marquette, Michigan | | Patt | L 4–5 | 2,960 | 10–4–1 |
| December 4 | 6:37 PM | at Northern Michigan* | #1 | Berry Events Center • Marquette, Michigan | | Patt | L 2–5 | 3,414 | 10–5–1 |
| December 10 | 7:07 PM | #11 Denver | #5 | AMSOIL Arena • Duluth, Minnesota | | Fanti | L 0–5 | 5,492 | 10–6–1 (3–3–1) |
| December 11 | 7:07 PM | #11 Denver | #5 | AMSOIL Arena • Duluth, Minnesota | | Fanti | W 6–2 | 5,558 | 11–6–1 (4–3–1) |
| December 30 | 7:07 PM | at #1 Minnesota State* | #6 | Mayo Clinic Health System Event Center • Mankato, Minnesota | CCMk–14 | Fanti | L 1–2 ^{OT} | 5,117 | 11–7–1 |
| January 1 | 7:07 PM | #1 Minnesota State* | #6 | AMSOIL Arena • Duluth, Minnesota | My9 | Fanti | L 0–3 | 5,878 | 11–8–1 |
| January 14 | 7:07 PM | Miami | #7 | AMSOIL Arena • Duluth, Minnesota | | Fanti | W 4–1 | 5,324 | 12–8–1 (5–3–1) |
| January 15 | 7:07 PM | Miami | #7 | AMSOIL Arena • Duluth, Minnesota | | Fanti | T 2–2 ^{SOL} | 5,827 | 12–8–2 (5–3–2) |
| January 21 | 7:07 PM | at #16 Omaha | #7 | Baxter Arena • Omaha, Nebraska | | Fanti | W 5–1 | 4,348 | 13–8–2 (6–3–2) |
| January 22 | 6:07 PM | at #16 Omaha | #7 | Baxter Arena • Omaha, Nebraska | | Fanti | L 1–5 | 4,702 | 13–9–2 (6–4–2) |
| January 28 | 7:07 PM | #3 Western Michigan | #7 | AMSOIL Arena • Duluth, Minnesota | | Fanti | W 5–4 | 5,479 | 14–9–2 (7–4–2) |
| January 29 | 7:07 PM | #3 Western Michigan | #7 | AMSOIL Arena • Duluth, Minnesota | | Fanti | L 2–3 ^{OT} | 6,296 | 14–10–2 (7–5–2) |
| February 8 | 6:00 PM | at #10 St. Cloud State | #6 | Herb Brooks National Hockey Center • St. Cloud, Minnesota | | Fanti | T 2–2 ^{SOL} | 3,842 | 14–10–3 (7–5–3) |
| February 11 | 8:00 PM | at #3 Denver | #6 | Magness Arena • Denver, Colorado | | Fanti | L 3–5 | 5,572 | 14–11–3 (7–6–3) |
| February 12 | 7:00 PM | at #3 Denver | #6 | Magness Arena • Denver, Colorado | | Stejskal | W 3–2 | 5,984 | 15–11–3 (8–6–3) |
| February 18 | 8:00 PM | #9 North Dakota | #7 | AMSOIL Arena • Duluth, Minnesota | CBSSN | Fanti | L 3–4 | 6,453 | 15–12–3 (8–7–3) |
| February 19 | 7:07 PM | #9 North Dakota | #7 | AMSOIL Arena • Duluth, Minnesota | | Stejskal | L 2–3 | 7,206 | 15–13–3 (8–8–3) |
| February 22 | 6:00 PM | at #11 St. Cloud State | #8 | Herb Brooks National Hockey Center • St. Cloud, Minnesota | | Fanti | T 1–1 ^{SOW} | 4,230 | 15–13–4 (8–8–4) |
| February 25 | 6:00 PM | at Miami | #8 | Steve Cady Arena • Oxford, Ohio | | Fanti | W 3–1 | 2,756 | 16–13–4 (9–8–4) |
| February 26 | 4:00 PM | at Miami | #8 | Steve Cady Arena • Oxford, Ohio | | Fanti | L 0–4 | 2,862 | 16–14–4 (9–9–4) |
| March 4 | 7:30 PM | #10 St. Cloud State | #11 | AMSOIL Arena • Duluth, Minnesota | CBSSN | Fanti | W 3–2 | 5,582 | 17–14–4 (10–9–4) |
| March 5 | 7:07 PM | #10 St. Cloud State | #11 | AMSOIL Arena • Duluth, Minnesota | | Fanti | L 0–2 | 5,791 | 17–15–4 (10–10–4) |
NCHC Tournament
| March 11 | 7:07 PM | at #9 St. Cloud State* | #10 | Herb Brooks National Hockey Center • St. Cloud, Minnesota (Quarterfinal Game 1) | | Fanti | W 5–2 | 2,594 | 18–15–4 |
| March 12 | 6:07 PM | at #9 St. Cloud State* | #10 | Herb Brooks National Hockey Center • St. Cloud, Minnesota (Quarterfinal Game 2) | | Fanti | W 4–3 ^{OT} | 3,227 | 19–15–4 |
| March 18 | 4:07 PM | vs. #3 Denver* | #8 | Xcel Energy Center • Saint Paul, Minnesota (Semifinal) | CBSSN | Fanti | W 2–0 | 10,253 | 20–15–4 |
| March 19 | 7:37 PM | vs. #7 Western Michigan* | #8 | Xcel Energy Center • Saint Paul, Minnesota (Championship) | CBSSN | Fanti | W 3–0 | 7,814 | 21–15–4 |
NCAA tournament
| March 24 | 2:00 PM | vs. #14 Michigan Tech* | #6 | Budweiser Events Center • Loveland, Colorado (West Regional semifinal) | ESPNU | Fanti | W 3–0 | 3,138 | 22–15–4 |
| March 26 | 3:00 PM | vs. #3 Denver* | #6 | Budweiser Events Center • Loveland, Colorado (West Regional final) | ESPNU | Fanti | L 1–2 | 4,812 | 22–16–4 |
*Non-conference game. ^{#}Rankings from USCHO.com Poll. All times are in Central Time. Source:

== Scoring statistics ==
| Name | Position | Games | Goals | Assists | Points | PIM |
|---|---|---|---|---|---|---|
| Kobe Roth | F | 42 | 16 | 13 | 29 | 2 |
| Blake Biondi | C | 42 | 17 | 11 | 28 | 16 |
| Koby Bender | C/RW | 42 | 7 | 19 | 26 | 14 |
| Quinn Olson | C/LW | 42 | 6 | 19 | 25 | 41 |
| Noah Cates | LW | 37 | 11 | 13 | 24 | 19 |
| Casey Gilling | C | 40 | 8 | 14 | 22 | 14 |
| Wyatt Kaiser | D | 34 | 2 | 17 | 19 | 46 |
| Dominic James | C/LW | 39 | 6 | 12 | 18 | 12 |
| Owen Gallatin | D | 42 | 2 | 15 | 17 | 22 |
| Tanner Laderoute | F | 38 | 10 | 3 | 13 | 10 |
| Jesse Jacques | F | 42 | 7 | 4 | 11 | 16 |
| Connor Kelley | D | 39 | 2 | 9 | 11 | 20 |
| Darian Gotz | D | 42 | 2 | 8 | 10 | 34 |
| Carter Loney | C | 42 | 3 | 6 | 9 | 17 |
| Matt Anderson | D | 42 | 2 | 5 | 7 | 31 |
| Luke Loheit | RW | 34 | 2 | 4 | 6 | 34 |
| Hunter Lellig | D | 41 | 1 | 5 | 6 | 6 |
| Ben Almquist | F | 18 | 2 | 3 | 5 | 4 |
| Kyler Kleven | C | 27 | 2 | 0 | 2 | 6 |
| Luke Mylymok | C/W | 10 | 1 | 1 | 2 | 4 |
| Louis Roehl | D | 38 | 0 | 2 | 2 | 44 |
| Jarrett Lee | F | 9 | 0 | 1 | 1 | 4 |
| Ben Patt | G | 3 | 0 | 0 | 0 | 2 |
| Will Francis | D | 5 | 0 | 0 | 0 | 2 |
| Zach Stejskal | G | 5 | 0 | 0 | 0 | 0 |
| Jake Rosenbaum | D | 7 | 0 | 0 | 0 | 0 |
| Ryan Fanti | G | 37 | 0 | 0 | 0 | 0 |
| Total | | | 109 | 184 | 293 | 420 |

== Goaltending statistics ==
| Name | Games | Minutes | Wins | Losses | Ties | Goals against | Saves | Shut outs | SV % | GAA |
|---|---|---|---|---|---|---|---|---|---|---|
| Ryan Fanti | 37 | 2201 | 20 | 12 | 4 | 67 | 875 | 7 | .929 | 1.83 |
| Zach Stejskal | 5 | 219 | 2 | 2 | 0 | 12 | 88 | 0 | .880 | 3.29 |
| Ben Patt | 3 | 118 | 0 | 2 | 0 | 8 | 56 | 0 | .875 | 4.07 |
| Empty Net | - | 18 | - | - | - | 6 | - | - | - | - |
| Total | 42 | 2556 | 22 | 16 | 4 | 93 | 1019 | 7 | .916 | 2.18 |

== Rankings ==
| Poll | Week | | | | | | | | | | | | | | | | | | | | | | | | | |
| Poll | Pre | 1 | 2 | 3 | 4 | 5 | 6 | 7 | 8 | 9 | 10 | 11 | 12 | 13 | 14 | 15 | 16 | 17 | 18 | 19 | 20 | 21 | 22 | 23 | 24 | 25 (Final) |
|---|---|---|---|---|---|---|---|---|---|---|---|---|---|---|---|---|---|---|---|---|---|---|---|---|---|---|
| USCHO.com | 6 (1) | 5 | 5 (1) | 5 | 4 (3) | 4 (3) | 4 (1) | 4 | 2 (5) | 1 (33) | 5 (1) | 6 | 8 | 7 | 7 | 7 | 6 | 6 | 7 | 8 | 11 | 10 | 8 | 6 | - | 5 |
| USA Today | 6 | 5 | 5 | 5 | 4 (5) | 3 (2) | 4 (1) | 4 (2) | 2 (3) | 1 (22) | 5 (3) | 5 | 8 | 7 | 7 | 7 | 7 | 6 | 7 | 9 | 10 | 10 | 8 | 3 | 6 | 5 |

Note: USCHO did not release a poll in week 24.

== Awards and honors ==
| Player | Award | Ref |
|---|---|---|
| Ryan Fanti | AHCA West Second Team All-American | |
| Ryan Fanti | NCHC Goaltender of the Year | |
| Ryan Fanti | Frozen Faceoff MVP | |
| Ryan Fanti | NCHC First Team | |
| Ryan Fanti | Frozen Faceoff All-Tournament Team | |
| Wyatt Kaiser | Frozen Faceoff All-Tournament Team | |
| Dominic James | Frozen Faceoff All-Tournament Team | |
| Blake Biondi | Frozen Faceoff All-Tournament Team | |

== Players drafted into the NHL ==
=== 2022 NHL entry draft ===
| Round | Pick | Player | NHL team |
|---|---|---|---|
| 1 | 31 | Isaac Howard^{†} | Tampa Bay Lightning |
| 5 | 150 | Zam Plante^{†} | Pittsburgh Penguins |
| 6 | 173 | Dominic James | Chicago Blackhawks |

† incoming freshman
