= 2021–22 Wisconsin Badgers men's ice hockey season =

American college ice hockey season

Holiday Face–Off, Champion
- Conference: 6th Big Ten
- Home ice: Kohl Center

Rankings
- USCHO: NR
- USA Today: NR

Record
- Overall: 10–24–3
- Conference: 6–17–1
- Home: 7–9–2
- Road: 2–15–0
- Neutral: 1–0–1

Coaches and captains
- Head coach: Tony Granato
- Assistant coaches: Mark Strobel; Mark Osiecki; Brad Winchester
- Captain: Tarek Baker
- Alternate captain(s): Roman Ahcan; Brock Caufield; Tyler Inamoto; Dominick Mersch

The 2021–22 Wisconsin Badgers men's ice hockey season was the 73rd season of play for the program. They represented the University of Wisconsin–Madison in the 2021–22 NCAA Division I men's ice hockey season. This marked the 21st season in the Big Ten Conference. They were coached by Tony Granato, in his sixth season, playing their home games at Kohl Center.

== Season ==
Despite losing its top 4 scorers from the previous season, Wisconsin entered the year ranked 13th in the nation. However, That soon proved to be a bit of wishful thinking and the Badgers were dropped from the polls by mid-October. The team faced a murderers-row of opponents, including three consecutive weeks against top-5 teams, and a lack of offensive firepower resulted in a last-place record come December.

Despite the poor start, Wisconsin had an opportunity to turn their season around beginning with the Holiday Face–Off, the first in-season tournament held in Wisconsin since the Badger Showdown ended in 2010. The Badgers ended up winning the event, defeating Providence in a shootout, but weren't able to carry over any momentum from the championship.

In the second half of the season, Wisconsin won just three games. Their 6th-place finish came just a year after they won their first Big Ten championship. Wisconsin faced Notre Dame in the Big Ten quarterfinals and pulled off a stunning victory behind a 50-save effort from Jared Moe. Unfortunately, the Badgers couldn't get a repeat performance and lost the nest two games to the fighting Irish, ending a rather disappointing season.

== Departures ==
Player	Position	Nationality	Cause
Robbie Beydoun	Goaltender	United States	Graduation (signed with Fort Wayne Komets)
Cole Caufield	Forward	United States	Signed professional contract (Montreal Canadiens)
Jason Dhooghe	Forward	United States	Graduation (retired)
Ty Emberson	Defenseman	United States	Signed professional contract (Arizona Coyotes)
Dylan Holloway	Forward	Canada	Signed professional contract (Edmonton Oilers)
Ty Pelton-Byce	Forward	United States	Graduation (signed with Manitoba Moose)
Linus Weissbach	Forward	Sweden	Graduation (signed with Buffalo Sabres)

== Recruiting ==
Player	Position	Nationality	Age	Notes
Carson Bantle	Forward	United States	19	Onalaska, WI; transfer from Michigan Tech; selected 142nd overall in 2020
Caden Brown	Forward	United States	18	Chesterfield, MO
Corson Ceulemans	Defenseman	Canada	18	Regina, SK; selected 25th overall in 2021
Max Johnson	Forward	United States	23	Lakeville, MN; graduate transfer from Bowling Green
Daniel Laatsch	Defenseman	United States	19	Altoona, WI; selected 215th overall in 2021
Liam Malmquist	Forward	United States	20	Edina, MN
Jake Martin	Defenseman	United States	18	White Bear Lake, MN
Jared Moe	Goaltender	United States	22	New Prague, MN; transfer from Minnesota; selected 184th overall in 2018
Brayden Morrison	Forward	Canada	19	Calgary, AB
Zach Urdahl	Forward	United States	19	Eau Claire, WI

== Roster ==
As of September 6, 2021.

No.	Nat.	Player	Class	Pos	Height	Weight	DoB	Hometown	Previous team	NHL rights
2	(United States)	Daniel Laatsch	Freshman	D	6' 5" (1.96 m)	188 lb (85 kg)	2002-02-13	Altoona, Wisconsin	Sioux City Musketeers (USHL)	PIT, 215th overall 2021
3	(United States)	Sam Stange	Sophomore	F	6' 1" (1.85 m)	200 lb (91 kg)	2001-04-20	Eau Claire, Wisconsin	Sioux Falls Stampede (USHL)	DET, 97th overall 2020
4	(Canada)	Corson Ceulemans	Freshman	D	6' 2" (1.88 m)	205 lb (93 kg)	2003-05-05	Beaumont, Alberta	Brooks Bandits (AJHL)	CBJ, 25th overall 2021
5	(United States)	Tyler Inamoto (A)	Senior	D	6' 2" (1.88 m)	198 lb (90 kg)	1999-05-06	Barrington, Illinois	USNTDP (USHL)	FLA, 133rd overall 2017
6	(United States)	Zach Urdahl	Freshman	F	6' 1" (1.85 m)	195 lb (88 kg)	2001-10-13	Eau Claire, Wisconsin	Des Moines Buccaneers (USHL)	—
7	(United States)	Mike Vorlicky	Junior	D	6' 1" (1.85 m)	190 lb (86 kg)	2000-07-17	Edina, Minnesota	Edina High School (USHS–MN)	—
8	(United States)	Max Johnson	Senior	F	5' 10" (1.78 m)	193 lb (88 kg)	1998-05-12	Lakeville, Minnesota	Bowling Green (WCHA)	—
9	(Canada)	Brayden Morrison	Freshman	F	6' 0" (1.83 m)	170 lb (77 kg)	2002-05-04	Calgary, Alberta	Okotoks Oilers (AJHL)	—
11	(United States)	Jack Gorniak	Senior	F	5' 11" (1.8 m)	187 lb (85 kg)	1999-09-15	West Salem, Wisconsin	West Salem High School (USHS–WI)	MTL, 123rd overall 2018
12	(United States)	Mathieu De St. Phalle	Sophomore	F	5' 9" (1.75 m)	160 lb (73 kg)	2000-03-20	Lake Forest, Illinois	Chicago (USHL)	—
13	(United States)	Roman Ahcan (A)	Senior	F	5' 9" (1.75 m)	175 lb (79 kg)	1999-03-24	Savage, Minnesota	Cedar Rapids RoughRiders (USHL)	—
14	(Finland)	Jesper Peltonen	Senior	D	5' 10" (1.78 m)	179 lb (81 kg)	1998-06-08	Helsinki, Finland	Omaha Lancers (USHL)	—
16	(United States)	Tarek Baker (C)	Senior	F	5' 10" (1.78 m)	190 lb (86 kg)	1997-02-22	Verona, Wisconsin	Sioux City Musketeers (USHL)	—
17	(United States)	Jake Martin	Freshman	D	6' 0" (1.83 m)	197 lb (89 kg)	2003-03-18	Eagle River, Wisconsin	USNTDP (USHL)	—
18	(United States)	Owen Lindmark	Junior	F	6' 0" (1.83 m)	190 lb (86 kg)	2001-05-17	Naperville, Illinois	USNTDP (USHL)	FLA, 137th overall 2019
19	(United States)	Brock Caufield (A)	Senior	F	5' 9" (1.75 m)	175 lb (79 kg)	1999-03-09	Stevens Point, Wisconsin	Green Bay Gamblers (USHL)	—
20	(United States)	Josh Ess	Senior	D	5' 11" (1.8 m)	187 lb (85 kg)	1999-04-03	Lakeville, Minnesota	Lakeville South High School (USHS–MN)	CHI, 215th overall 2017
21	(United States)	Carson Bantle	Sophomore	F	6' 5" (1.96 m)	205 lb (93 kg)	2002-01-22	Onalaska, Wisconsin	Michigan Tech (WCHA)	ARI, 142nd overall 2020
22	(United States)	Ryder Donovan	Junior	F	6' 3" (1.91 m)	203 lb (92 kg)	2000-10-04	Duluth, Minnesota	East High School (USHS–MN)	VGK, 110th overall 2019
23	(United States)	Liam Malmquist	Freshman	F	5' 10" (1.78 m)	161 lb (73 kg)	2000-10-08	Edina, Minnesota	Penticton Vees (BCHL)	—
24	(Canada)	Anthony Kehrer	Sophomore	D	5' 11" (1.8 m)	196 lb (89 kg)	2002-03-04	Winnipeg, Manitoba	Sioux City Musketeers (USHL)	—
25	(United States)	Dominick Mersch (A)	Senior	F	6' 0" (1.83 m)	193 lb (88 kg)	1998-12-16	Park Ridge, Illinois	Lincoln Stars (USHL)	—
26	(United States)	Luke LaMaster	Sophomore	D	6' 0" (1.83 m)	187 lb (85 kg)	1999-10-17	Duluth, Minnesota	Sioux City Musketeers (USHL)	—
27	(United States)	Caden Brown	Freshman	F	5' 11" (1.8 m)	175 lb (79 kg)	2003-06-22	St. Louis, Missouri	USNTDP (USHL)	—
28	(United States)	Shay Donovan	Junior	D	6' 3" (1.91 m)	190 lb (86 kg)	1998-05-26	Duluth, Minnesota	Wilkes-Barre/Scranton Knights (NAHL)	—
29	(United States)	Ben Garrity	Sophomore	G	6' 2" (1.88 m)	184 lb (83 kg)	2000-01-20	Rosemount, Minnesota	Minot Minotauros (NAHL)	—
31	(United States)	Cameron Rowe	Sophomore	G	6' 3" (1.91 m)	212 lb (96 kg)	2001-06-01	Wilmette, Illinois	Des Moines Buccaneers (USHL)	—
35	(United States)	Jared Moe	Junior	G	6' 4" (1.93 m)	220 lb (100 kg)	1999-07-22	New Prague, Minnesota	Minnesota (Big Ten)	WPG, 184th overall 2018

== Standings ==
2021–22 Big Ten ice hockey Standings
	Conference record										Overall record					
	GP	W	L	T	OTW	OTL	3/SW	PTS	GF	GA	GP	W	L	T	GF	GA
#5 Minnesota †	24	18	6	0	1	2	0	55	90	50	39	26	13	0	138	91
#2 Michigan *	24	16	8	0	0	3	0	51	91	59	42	31	10	1	167	94
#9 Notre Dame	24	17	7	0	5	1	0	47	74	55	40	28	12	0	122	75
#16 Ohio State	24	13	9	2	1	1	1	42	76	59	37	22	13	2	125	87
Penn State	24	6	17	1	1	1	1	20	63	92	38	17	20	1	117	122
Wisconsin	24	6	17	1	1	2	0	20	53	96	37	10	24	3	76	132
Michigan State	24	6	18	0	1	0	0	17	51	87	36	12	23	1	76	119
Championship: March 19, 2022 † indicates conference regular season champion * indicates conference tournament champion Rankings: USCHO.com Top 20 Poll; updated April 7, 2022

== Schedule and results ==
Date	Time	Opponent^{#}	Rank^{#}	Site	TV	Decision	Result	Attendance	Record
Exhibition
October 3	1:00 PM	#6 Minnesota Duluth*	#11	Kohl Center • Madison, WI (Exhibition)			L 2–4		
Regular Season
October 8	7:00 PM	Michigan Tech*	#13	Kohl Center • Madison, WI	BSW	Rowe	L 2–5	8,550	0–1–0
October 9	7:00 PM	Michigan Tech*	#13	Kohl Center • Madison, WI	BSW	Moe	L 1–5	10,618	0–2–0
October 14	7:00 PM	Army*		Kohl Center • Madison, WI	BSW+	Rowe	W 4–1	7,175	1–2–0
October 15	7:00 PM	Army*		Kohl Center • Madison, WI	BSW	Moe	W 1–0	10,281	2–2–0
October 22	7:37 PM	at #3 St. Cloud State*		Herb Brooks National Hockey Center • St. Cloud, MN		Rowe	L 1–5	3,774	2–3–0
October 23	6:07 PM	at #3 St. Cloud State*		Herb Brooks National Hockey Center • St. Cloud, MN		Moe	L 1–4	4,165	2–4–0
October 29	6:00 PM	at #2 Michigan		Yost Ice Arena • Ann Arbor, MI	BTN	Moe	L 0–3	5,338	2–5–0 (0–1–0)
October 30	6:00 PM	at #2 Michigan		Yost Ice Arena • Ann Arbor, MI	BTN+	Rowe	W 4–2	5,598	3–5–0 (1–1–0)
November 5	7:00 PM	#5 Minnesota		Kohl Center • Madison, WI (Rivalry)	BSW+, BSN+	Moe	W 4–3 ^{OT}	9,813	4–5–0 (2–1–0)
November 6	8:00 PM	#5 Minnesota		Kohl Center • Madison, WI (Rivalry)	BSW, BSN+	Rowe	L 1–4	12,015	4–6–0 (2–2–0)
November 12	6:30 PM	at #15 Notre Dame		Compton Family Ice Arena • Notre Dame, IN	NBCSN	Moe	L 1–5	4,335	4–7–0 (2–3–0)
November 13	5:00 PM	at #15 Notre Dame		Compton Family Ice Arena • Notre Dame, IN	NBCRN	Rowe	L 0–3	3,977	4–8–0 (2–4–0)
November 19	6:00 PM	at Michigan State		Munn Ice Arena • East Lansing, MI		Moe	L 2–3	5,653	4–9–0 (2–5–0)
November 20	7:00 PM	at Michigan State		Munn Ice Arena • East Lansing, MI		Moe	L 2–5	5,009	4–10–0 (2–6–0)
November 26	7:07 PM	Clarkson*		Kohl Center • Madison, WI	BSW+	Moe	T 2–2 ^{OT}	7,930	4–10–1
November 27	7:07 PM	Clarkson*		Kohl Center • Madison, WI	BSW	Rowe	L 0–3	8,919	4–11–1
December 3	7:00 PM	USNTDP*		Pegula Ice Arena • University Park, PA (Exhibition)			L 0–4		
December 10	7:00 PM	Penn State		Kohl Center • Madison, WI	BSW	Moe	W 4–1	9,369	5–11–1 (3–6–0)
December 11	6:00 PM	Penn State		Kohl Center • Madison, WI	BSW	Moe	L 4–5 ^{OT}	10,176	5–12–1 (3–7–0)
Holiday Face–Off
December 28	7:37 PM	vs. Yale*		Fiserv Forum • Milwaukee, WI (Face–Off Semifinal)	BSW	Moe	W 3–2 ^{OT}	6,533	6–12–1
December 29	7:37 PM	vs. #16 Providence*		Fiserv Forum • Milwaukee, WI (Face–Off Championship)	BSN, BSO, BSW	Moe	T 2–2 ^{SOW}	6,225	6–12–2
Regular Season
January 8	6:00 PM	#17 Ohio State		Kohl Center • Madison, WI	BSW+	Moe	L 3–5	10,653	6–13–2 (3–8–0)
January 8	3:00 PM	#17 Ohio State		Kohl Center • Madison, WI	BSW	Moe	T 2–2 ^{SOL}	7,837	6–13–3 (3–8–1)
January 14	7:00 PM	Michigan State		Kohl Center • Madison, WI	BSW	Moe	W 5–2	8,572	7–13–3 (4–8–1)
January 15	8:00 PM	Michigan State		Kohl Center • Madison, WI	BSW	Moe	W 5–2	10,946	8–13–3 (5–8–1)
January 21	6:00 PM	at Penn State		Pegula Ice Arena • University Park, PA		Moe	L 1–4	6,008	8–14–3 (5–9–1)
January 22	5:00 PM	at Penn State		Pegula Ice Arena • University Park, PA		Moe	L 2–7	6,247	8–15–3 (5–10–1)
January 28	6:00 PM	#4 Michigan		Kohl Center • Madison, WI	BSW	Moe	L 1–5	9,994	8–16–3 (5–11–1)
January 29	8:00 PM	#4 Michigan		Kohl Center • Madison, WI	BTN	Rowe	L 2–6	12,231	8–17–3 (5–12–1)
February 4	6:00 PM	at #9 Ohio State		Value City Arena • Columbus, OH		Moe	L 3–4 ^{OT}	4,743	8–18–3 (5–13–1)
February 5	7:00 PM	at #9 Ohio State		Value City Arena • Columbus, OH	BTN	Rowe	L 2–6	4,592	8–19–3 (5–14–1)
February 12	7:30 PM	#11 Notre Dame		Kohl Center • Madison, WI	BTN	Moe	W 5–3	9,228	9–19–3 (6–14–1)
February 13	7:00 PM	#11 Notre Dame		Kohl Center • Madison, WI	BSW	Moe	L 2–3	10,934	9–20–3 (6–15–1)
February 25	8:00 PM	at #4 Minnesota		3M Arena at Mariucci • Minneapolis, MN (Rivalry)	ESPNU	Moe	L 0–5	9,350	9–21–3 (6–16–1)
February 26	8:00 PM	at #4 Minnesota		3M Arena at Mariucci • Minneapolis, MN (Rivalry)	BTN	Rowe	L 0–9	10,069	9–22–3 (6–17–1)
Big Ten Tournament
March 4	6:00 PM	at #7 Notre Dame*		Compton Family Ice Arena • Notre Dame, Indiana (Quarterfinal game 1)		Moe	W 3–1	3,634	10–22–3
March 5	5:00 PM	at #7 Notre Dame*		Compton Family Ice Arena • Notre Dame, Indiana (Quarterfinal game 2)		Moe	L 2–3	3,738	10–23–3
March 6	5:00 PM	at #7 Notre Dame*		Compton Family Ice Arena • Notre Dame, Indiana (Quarterfinal game 3)		Moe	L 2–4	2,612	10–24–3
*Non-conference game. ^{#}Rankings from USCHO.com Poll. All times are in Central Time. Source:

== Scoring statistics ==
Name	Position	Games	Goals	Assists	Points	PIM
Mathieu De St. Phalle	F	36	10	12	22	8
Corson Ceulemans	D	34	7	15	22	33
Brock Caufield	RW	37	7	12	19	14
Tarek Baker	LW	27	5	12	17	38
Jack Gorniak	C/LW	37	5	10	15	14
Carson Bantle	LW	27	8	6	14	28
Roman Ahcan	LW	34	5	7	12	99
Sam Stange	RW	37	4	7	11	6
Dominick Mersch	C	37	5	5	10	43
Liam Malmquist	F	35	1	8	9	4
Max Johnson	C	31	5	2	7	2
Zach Urdahl	LW	36	4	3	7	4
Jesper Peltonen	D	36	2	5	7	6
Caden Brown	F	33	2	4	6	2
Josh Ess	D	37	1	5	6	4
Ryder Donovan	C/RW	34	2	2	4	28
Daniel Laatsch	D	28	1	2	3	4
Anthony Kehrer	D	36	1	2	3	10
Tyler Inamoto	D	26	0	2	2	26
Owen Lindmark	C	9	1	0	1	2
Ben Garrity	G	5	0	0	0	0
Shay Donovan	D	6	0	0	0	0
Jake Martin	D	11	0	0	0	2
Luke LaMaster	D	17	0	0	0	8
Cameron Rowe	G	17	0	0	0	0
Brayden Morrison	C	19	0	0	0	4
Jared Moe	G	31	0	0	0	0
Bench	-	-	-	-	-	6
Total			76	121	197	395

== Goaltending statistics ==
Name	Games	Minutes	Wins	Losses	Ties	Goals against	Saves	Shut outs	SV %	GAA
Jared Moe	31	1639	8	16	3	81	894	1	.917	2.97
Cameron Rowe	17	585	2	8	0	42	261	0	.861	4.30
Ben Garrity	5	10	0	0	0	3	1	0	.250	17.91
Empty Net	-	10	-	-	-	6	-	-	-	-
Total	37	2245	10	24	3	132	1156	1	.898	3.53

== Rankings ==
Poll	Week																									
Poll	Pre	1	2	3	4	5	6	7	8	9	10	11	12	13	14	15	16	17	18	19	20	21	22	23	24	25 (Final)
USCHO.com	11	13	NR	NR	NR	NR	NR	NR	NR	NR	NR	NR	NR	NR	NR	NR	NR	NR	NR	NR	NR	NR	NR	NR	-	NR
USA Today	12	14	NR	NR	NR	NR	NR	NR	NR	NR	NR	NR	NR	NR	NR	NR	NR	NR	NR	NR	NR	NR	NR	NR	NR	NR

Note: USCHO did not release a poll in week 24.

== Players drafted into the NHL ==
=== 2022 NHL entry draft ===
Round	Pick	Player	NHL team
3	78	Quinn Finley^{†}	New York Islanders
4	100	Tyson Jugnauth^{†}	Seattle Kraken
4	124	Cruz Lucius^{†}	Carolina Hurricanes
7	201	Owen Mehlenbacher^{†}	Detroit Red Wings

† incoming freshman
