= Parker Ford (ice hockey) =

American ice hockey player (born 2000)

- Born: July 20, 2000 (age 26) Wakefield, Rhode Island, U.S.
- Height: 5 ft 9 in (175 cm)
- Weight: 181 lb (82 kg; 12 st 13 lb)
- Position: Center
- Shoots: Right
- NHL team (P) Cur. team: Winnipeg Jets; Manitoba Moose (AHL)
- NHL draft: Undrafted
- Playing career: 2023–present

Parker Ford (born July 20, 2000) is an American professional ice hockey forward for the Manitoba Moose in the American Hockey League (AHL) while under contract to the Winnipeg Jets of the National Hockey League (NHL).

== Playing career ==
Ford began his juninor development with the Sioux City Musketeers in the United States Hockey League (USHL) before committing and playing collegiate hockey with Providence College in the Hockey East. Upon completing his collegiate career with the Friars in the 2022–23 season, Ford was signed as an undrafted free agent to a two-year, entry-level contract with the Winnipeg Jets of the NHL on March 26, 2023. He made his professional debut to end the season with the Jets' AHL affiliate, the Manitoba Moose, recording 4 points through 8 regular season games.

During the 2024–25 season, Ford registered 11 goals through 37 games with the Moose before he received his second recall to the Winnipeg Jets, making his NHL debut and scoring his first NHL goal in a 6-2 victory over the Boston Bruins on January 31, 2025. On October 9, 2025, it was formally announced that Ford would make the opening night roster for the Winnipeg Jets in the 2025–26 season after a strong performance in training camp.

== Career statistics ==
=== Regular season and playoffs ===
			Regular season					Playoffs
Season	Team	League	GP	G	A	Pts	PIM	GP	G	A	Pts	PIM
2017–18	Sioux City Musketeers	USHL	51	8	14	22	36	—	—	—	—	—
2018–19	Sioux City Musketeers	USHL	56	19	24	43	40	2	0	0	0	6
2019–20	Providence College	HE	31	9	13	22	22	—	—	—	—	—
2020–21	Providence College	HE	25	7	12	19	14	—	—	—	—	—
2021–22	Providence College	HE	38	13	14	27	31	—	—	—	—	—
2022–23	Providence College	HE	37	12	14	26	22	—	—	—	—	—
2022–23	Manitoba Moose	AHL	8	2	2	4	4	5	0	0	0	4
2023–24	Manitoba Moose	AHL	72	18	23	41	57	2	1	0	1	0
2024–25	Manitoba Moose	AHL	41	14	7	21	36	—	—	—	—	—
2024–25	Winnipeg Jets	NHL	3	1	0	1	2	—	—	—	—	—
2025–26	Winnipeg Jets	NHL	15	0	1	1	4	—	—	—	—	—
2025–26	Manitoba Moose	AHL	52	8	18	26	24	7	2	1	3	4
NHL totals			18	1	1	2	6	—	—	—	—	—

=== International ===
Year	Team	Event	Result	GP	G	A	Pts	PIM
2020	United States	WJC	6th	5	0	0	0	2
Junior totals				5	0	0	0	2

== Awards and honors ==
Award	Year
College
All-Hockey East Third All-Star Team	2023
