= 2021–22 Big Ten Conference ice hockey season =

Men's ice hockey season

- Season: 2021–22
- Conference: Big Ten Conference
- Division: Division I
- Sport: ice hockey
- Duration: October 2, 2021– April 7, 2022
- Number of teams: 7

2022 NHL Entry Draft
- Top draft pick: David Gucciardi
- Picked by: Washington Capitals

Regular season
- Season champions: Minnesota
- Season MVP: Ben Meyers
- Top scorer: Matty Beniers

Big Ten tournament
- Tournament champions: Michigan
- Runners-up: Minnesota
- Tournament MVP: Erik Portillo
- Top scorer: Nick Blankenburg (6)

NCAA tournament
- Bids: 3
- Record: 5–3
- Best Finish: National semifinal
- Team(s): Michigan, Minnesota

The 2021–22 Big Ten Conference ice hockey season was the 32nd season of play for the Big Ten Conference's men's ice hockey division and will take place during the 2021–22 NCAA Division I men's ice hockey season. The regular season is set to begin on October 2, 2021, and conclude on February 26, 2022. The conference tournament is scheduled to begin in early March, 2022.

== Coaches ==
=== Records ===
Team	Head coach	Season at school	Record at school	Big Ten record
Michigan	Mel Pearson	5	68–55–15	41–39–10
Michigan State	Danton Cole	5	46–78–11	30–55–9
Minnesota	Bob Motzko	4	58–37–11	36–24–10
Notre Dame	Jeff Jackson	17	348–219–66	49–36–9
Ohio State	Steve Rohlik	9	140–114–34	66–67–17
Penn State	Guy Gadowsky	11	155–132–23	72–83–14
Wisconsin	Tony Granato	6	82–82–13	53–52–11

== Standings ==
2021–22 Big Ten ice hockey Standings
	Conference record										Overall record					
	GP	W	L	T	OTW	OTL	3/SW	PTS	GF	GA	GP	W	L	T	GF	GA
#5 Minnesota †	24	18	6	0	1	2	0	55	90	50	39	26	13	0	138	91
#2 Michigan *	24	16	8	0	0	3	0	51	91	59	42	31	10	1	167	94
#9 Notre Dame	24	17	7	0	5	1	0	47	74	55	40	28	12	0	122	75
#16 Ohio State	24	13	9	2	1	1	1	42	76	59	37	22	13	2	125	87
Penn State	24	6	17	1	1	1	1	20	63	92	38	17	20	1	117	122
Wisconsin	24	6	17	1	1	2	0	20	53	96	37	10	24	3	76	132
Michigan State	24	6	18	0	1	0	0	17	51	87	36	12	23	1	76	119
Championship: March 19, 2022 † indicates conference regular season champion * indicates conference tournament champion Rankings: USCHO.com Top 20 Poll; updated April 7, 2022

== Non-Conference record ==
Of the sixteen teams that are selected to participate in the NCAA tournament, ten will be via at-large bids. Those 10 teams are determined based upon the PairWise rankings. The rankings take into account all games played but are heavily affected by intra-conference results. The result is that teams from leagues which perform better in non-conference are much more likely to receive at-large bids even if they possess inferior records overall.

As a conference, the Big Ten had a tremendous non-conference season. Only one of the seven league members (Wisconsin) had a losing record in non-league games. Four teams had at least an 80% winning percentage. On the whole, only one conference possessed a winning record against the Big Ten (NCHC), however, they did so by only one victory.

=== Regular season record ===
Team	Atlantic Hockey	CCHA	ECAC Hockey	Hockey East	Independent	NCHC	Total
Michigan	2–0–0	3–0–1	0–0–0	2–0–0	0–0–0	2–1–0	9–1–1
Michigan State	1–1–0	3–0–0	0–0–0	0–1–1	0–0–0	2–1–0	6–3–1
Minnesota	2–0–0	0–0–0	0–0–0	0–0–0	1–1–0	2–4–0	5–5–0
Notre Dame	4–2–0	2–0–0	0–0–0	1–0–0	1–0–0	0–0–0	8–2–0
Ohio State	2–2–0	2–0–0	0–0–0	2–0–0	2–0–0	0–0–0	8–2–0
Penn State	3–1–0	2–0–0	1–0–0	0–0–0	2–0–0	1–0–0	9–1–0
Wisconsin	2–0–0	0–2–0	1–1–1	0–0–1	0–0–0	0–2–0	3–5–1
Overall	16–6–0	12–2–1	2–1–1	5–1–2	6–1–0	7–8–0	48–19–4

== Statistics ==
=== Leading scorers ===
GP = Games played; G = Goals; A = Assists; Pts = Points; PIM = Penalty minutes

Player	Class	Team	GP	G	A	Pts	PIM
Matty Beniers	Sophomore	Michigan	20	13	14	27	10
Ben Meyers	Junior	Minnesota	19	13	11	24	4
Luke Hughes	Freshman	Michigan	24	13	9	22	10
Jackson LaCombe	Junior	Minnesota	24	1	21	22	6
Matthew Knies	Freshman	Minnesota	18	6	14	20	4
Georgii Merkulov	Freshman	Ohio State	23	11	9	20	8
Mackie Samoskevich	Freshman	Michigan	24	5	14	19	6
Jake Wise	Senior	Ohio State	24	7	12	19	0
Owen Power	Sophomore	Michigan	16	2	16	18	4
Thomas Bordeleau	Sophomore	Michigan	22	7	11	18	14

=== Leading goaltenders ===
Minimum 1/3 of team's minutes played in conference games.
GP = Games played; Min = Minutes played; W = Wins; L = Losses; T = Ties; GA = Goals against; SO = Shutouts; SV% = Save percentage; GAA = Goals against average

Player	Class	Team	GP	Min	W	L	T	GA	SO	SV%	GAA
Justen Close	Junior	Minnesota	15	750	10	2	0	21	2	.938	1.68
Matthew Galajda	Graduate	Notre Dame	14	728	9	4	0	25	1	.926	2.06
Erik Portillo	Sophomore	Michigan	24	1403	16	8	0	54	2	.924	2.31
Ryan Bischel	Junior	Notre Dame	16	716	8	3	0	28	1	.921	2.34
Jakub Dobeš	Freshman	Ohio State	24	1299	13	9	2	53	1	.928	2.45

== Conference tournament ==
Quarterfinals; March 4–6
2	Michigan	4	8	—
7	Michigan State	1	0	—
3	Notre Dame	1	3	4
6	Wisconsin	3	2	2
4	Ohio State	4	2	1
5	Penn State	3	3	2

Semifinals; March 12
1	Minnesota	3
5	Penn State	2
2	Michigan	2
3	Notre Dame	1

Championship; March 19
1	Minnesota	3
2	Michigan	4

Note: * denotes overtime periods. Note: * denotes overtime periods.

== NCAA tournament ==
=== Regional semifinal ===
==== Midwest ====
March 25, 2022; 3:00 PM	(1) Michigan	5 – 3 (2–1, 3–1, 0–1)	(4) American International	PPL Center; Attendance: 2,155

Game reference

Erik Portillo
Goalies
Alec Calvaruso
Referees:
Cameron Lynch
Brad LeBlanc
Linesmen:
Patrick Dapuzzo
Steve Drain

(Hughes, Moyle) Garrett Van Wyhe (5) – 03:37	1–0
(Brisson, Beniers) Ethan Edwards (3) – 04:16	2–0
	2–1	12:32 – Brian Rigali (13) (Bennett, Galambos)
(Power, Johnson) Brendan Brisson (20) – PP – 20:43	3–1
(Brisson, Johnson) Matty Beniers (20) – GW – 22:43	4–1
	4–2	26:15 – Justin Young (12) (Theodore)
(Power, Samoskevich) Dylan Duke (10) – 26:43	5–2
	5–3	53:48 – PP – Blake Bennett (19) (Barriga, Young)

8 min
Penalties
6 min
31
Shots
32

==== Northeast ====
March 25, 2022; 6:00 PM	(2) Minnesota	4 – 3 (OT) (1–2, 1–1, 1–0, 1–0)	(3) Massachusetts	DCU Center; Attendance: 6,002

Game reference

Justen Close
Goalies
Matt Murray
Referees:
Ryan Hersey
Nick Krebsbach
Linesmen:
John Grandt
Tyler Liffrig

	0–1	14:09 – EA – Reed Lebster (8) (Kiefiuk, Ufko)
	0–2	15:05 – PP – Garrett Wait (13) (Ufko, Trivigno)
(Meyers, Knies) Ryan Johnson (3) – 18:02	1–2
	1–3	21:24 – Reed Lebster (9) (Kiefiuk, Del Gaizo)
(Nelson, Pitlick) Tristan Broz (6) – 37:09	2–3
(unassisted) Matthew Knies (13) – PP – 53:17	3–3
(Huglen, Nelson) Ben Meyers (17) – GW – 68:31	4–3

2 min
Penalties
4 min
24
Shots
23

==== East ====
March 24, 2022; 6:00 PM	(2) North Dakota	1 – 2 (OT) (1–0, 0–1, 0–0, 0–1)	(3) Notre Dame	MVP Arena; Attendance: 2,345

Game reference

Zach Driscoll
Goalies
Matthew Galajda
Referees:
Geno Binda Jr.
Jeremy Tufts
Linesmen:
Kevin Briganti
Bill Kingdon

(Ness) Brent Johnson (2) – 18:43	1–0
	1–1	21:03 – Landon Slaggert (12) (G. Slaggert)
	1–2	61:38 – GW PP – Graham Slaggert (12) (Leivermann, L. Slaggert)

6 min
Penalties
6 min
24
Shots
25

=== Regional final ===
==== Midwest ====
March 27, 2022; 6:30 PM	(1) Michigan	7 – 4 (2–0, 2–0, 3–4)	(2) Quinnipiac	PPL Center; Attendance: 3,256

Game reference

Erik Portillo
Goalies
Yaniv Perets out 40:00
Dylan St. Cyr in 40:00
Referees:
Geoff Miller
Steve Rouillard
Linesmen:
Jeff McCorkle
Kyle Richetelle

(Power, Lambert) Nolan Moyle (6) – 00:33	1–0
(Hughes) Jimmy Lambert (5) – 14:36	2–0
(Brisson, Power) Thomas Bordeleau (11) – PP – 26:06	3–0
(Blankenburg) Garrett Van Wyhe (6) – SH – 38:54	4–0
	4–1	44:12 – Jayden Lee (6) (Brind'Amour, van Nes)
	4–2	49:01 – Wyatt Bongiovanni (16) (de Jong)
	4–3	51:02 – Desi Burgart (8) (Smilanic, Quillan)
(Bordeleau, Estapa) Michael Pastujov (11) – GW EN – 56:23	5–3
(Power) Nolan Moyle (7) – EN – 58:37	6–3
(Bordeleau, Power) Brendan Brisson (21) – PP – 59:25	7–3
	7–4	59:38 – Zach Metsa (10) (Quillan, Leyh)

6 min
Penalties
4 min
30
Shots
34

==== Northeast ====
March 27, 2022; 4:00 PM	(1) Western Michigan	0 – 3 (0–1, 0–0, 0–2)	(2) Minnesota	DCU Center; Attendance: 2,848

Game reference

Brandon Bussi
Goalies
Justen Close
Referees:
Joe Carusone
C.J. Hanfin
Linesmen:
Brian Oliver
Ryan Knapp

0–1	10:10 – GW – Matthew Knies (14) (Faber, Meyers)
0–2	40:33 – PP – Aaron Huglen (7) (Meyers, LaCombe)
0–3	58:03 – SH EN – Blake McLaughlin (13) (unassisted)

2 min
Penalties
4 min
24
Shots
26

==== East ====
March 26, 2022; 6:30 PM	(1) Minnesota State	1 – 0 (1–0, 0–0, 0–0)	(3) Notre Dame	MVP Arena; Attendance: 3,449

Game reference
Dryden McKay	Goalies	Matthew Galajda	Referees: Geno Bindo; Jeremy Tufts; Linesmen: Kevin Briganti; Bill Kingdon
(Furry) Nathan Smith (19) – GW – 19:44 / 1–0			Referees: Geno Bindo; Jeremy Tufts; Linesmen: Kevin Briganti; Bill Kingdon
6 min	Penalties	2 min	Referees: Geno Bindo; Jeremy Tufts; Linesmen: Kevin Briganti; Bill Kingdon
33	Shots	23	Referees: Geno Bindo; Jeremy Tufts; Linesmen: Kevin Briganti; Bill Kingdon

=== National semifinal ===
April 7, 2022; 5:00 PM	(MW1) Michigan	2 – 3 (OT) (0–1, 1–0, 1–1, 0–1)	(W1) Denver	TD Garden; Attendance: 17,850

Game reference

Erik Portillo
Goalies
Magnus Chrona
Referees:
Joe Carusone
CJ Hanafin
Linesmen:
Ryan Knapp
Brian Oliver

	0–1	11:22 – Brett Stapley (17) (Barrow, Lee)
(Moyle, Van Wyhe) Jimmy Lambert (6) – 24:03	1–1
	1–2	45:36 – Cameron Wright (22) (Benning, Rizzo)
(Pastujov, Estapa) Thomas Bordeleau (12) – 49:09	2–2
	2–3	74:53 – GW – Carter Savoie (23) (Brink, Benning)

6 min
Penalties
0 min
21
Shots
33

April 7, 2022; 8:30 PM	(E1) Minnesota State	5 – 1 (0–1, 2–0, 3–0)	(NE2) Minnesota	TD Garden; Attendance: 17,850

Game reference

Dryden McKay
Goalies
Justen Close
Referees:
Ryan Sweeney
Michael Schubert
Linesmen:
Anthony Valle
Shane Kanaly

	0–1	09:00 – Matthew Knies (15) (Brodzinski)
(Sowder, Pavel) Benton Maass (6) – 27:22	1–1
(Silye, Livingstone) Reggie Lutz (15) – GW – 33:31	2–1
(McNeely, Groll) Ondřej Pavel (12) – 41:57	3–1
(Morton) David Silye (8) – 53:17	4–1
(unassisted) Brendan Furry (13) – EN – 58:51	5–1

0 min
Penalties
0 min
32
Shots
17

== Ranking ==
=== USCHO ===
Team	Pre	1	2	3	4	5	6	7	8	9	10	11	12	13	14	15	16	17	18	19	20	21	22	23	Final
Michigan	3	3	3	1	2	3	2	1	4	3	3	3	6	4	3	4	3	4	2	2	5	4	4	2	3
Michigan State	NR	NR	NR	NR	NR	NR	NR	NR	NR	NR	NR	NR	NR	NR	NR	NR	NR	NR	NR	NR	NR	NR	NR	NR	NR
Minnesota	4	4	4	4	7	5	6	7	11	11	10	11	9	8	11	10	8	7	5	4	2	2	2	5	4
Notre Dame	18	19	17	13	14	17	15	14	8	8	8	10	13	13	13	11	13	11	12	9	7	8	9	9	8
Ohio State	NR	NR	NR	NR	NR	NR	18	17	17	18	17	17	17	16	15	12	9	8	11	12	12	15	16	16	16
Penn State	NR	NR	NR	NR	NR	16	19	NR	NR	NR	NR	NR	NR	NR	NR	NR	NR	NR	NR	NR	NR	NR	NR	NR	NR
Wisconsin	11	13	NR	NR	NR	NR	NR	NR	NR	NR	NR	NR	NR	NR	NR	NR	NR	NR	NR	NR	NR	NR	NR	NR	NR

=== USA Today ===
Team	Pre	1	2	3	4	5	6	7	8	9	10	11	12	13	14	15	16	17	18	19	20	21	22	23	24	Final
Michigan	2	3	3	1	3	4	2	1	3	2	3	3	7	5	4	4	4	4	2	2	4	4	4	2	2	3
Michigan State	NR	NR	NR	NR	NR	NR	NR	NR	NR	NR	NR	NR	NR	NR	NR	NR	NR	NR	NR	NR	NR	NR	NR	NR	NR	NR
Minnesota	4	4	4	4	7	5	8	7	12	12	11	11	11	8	11	10	10	8	6	4	2	2	3	6	4	4
Notre Dame	NR	NR	NR	12	NR	NR	15	15	8	8	8	10	13	13	14	12	12	11	11	8	7	8	9	10	8	8
Ohio State	NR	NR	NR	NR	NR	NR	14	NR	NR	NR	NR	NR	NR	15	15	11	8	7	12	12	12	15	NR	NR	NR	NR
Penn State	NR	NR	NR	NR	NR	NR	NR	NR	NR	NR	NR	NR	NR	NR	NR	NR	NR	NR	NR	NR	NR	NR	NR	NR	NR	NR
Wisconsin	12	14	NR	NR	NR	NR	NR	NR	NR	NR	NR	NR	NR	NR	NR	NR	NR	NR	NR	NR	NR	NR	NR	NR	NR	NR

=== Pairwise ===
Team	1	2	3	4	5	6	7	8	9	10	11	12	13	14	15	16	17	18	19	20	21	22	Final
Michigan	14	10	1	2	4	5	2	3	2	3	1	6	2	2	1	1	1	1	1	2	2	2	1
Michigan State	14	37	5	25	16	21	23	20	18	20	18	19	24	29	31	30	31	32	35	33	37	37	35
Minnesota	14	25	22	23	11	10	8	18	12	11	11	11	8	11	11	11	8	5	5	3	3	3	6
Notre Dame	14	14	2	7	15	20	9	7	5	8	10	16	15	15	12	12	12	12	11	5	8	6	8
Ohio State	14	30	16	19	21	11	12	16	20	17	16	15	13	14	9	10	10	12	13	13	15	15	15
Penn State	4	7	21	10	7	12	21	22	20	24	24	20	23	28	21	23	24	24	26	25	25	25	25
Wisconsin	14	49	9	37	23	23	31	36	41	40	38	37	38	33	37	39	35	34	36	38	34	35	37

Note: teams ranked in the top-10 automatically qualify for the NCAA tournament. Teams ranked 11-16 can qualify based upon conference tournament results.

== Awards ==
=== NCAA ===
AHCA All-American Teams
West First Team	Position	Team
Matty Beniers	F	Michigan
West Second Team	Position	Team
Luke Hughes	D	Michigan
Owen Power	D	Michigan
Ben Meyers	F	Minnesota

=== Big Ten ===
Award		Recipient
Player of the Year		Ben Meyers, Minnesota
Defensive Player of the Year		Brock Faber, Minnesota
Goaltender of the Year		Jakub Dobeš, Ohio State
Freshman of the Year		Jakub Dobeš, Ohio State
Freshman of the Year		Luke Hughes, Michigan
Scoring Champion		Matty Beniers, Michigan
Coach of the Year		Bob Motzko, Minnesota
Tournament Most Outstanding Player		Erik Portillo, Michigan
All-Big Ten Teams
First Team	Position	Second Team
Jakub Dobeš, Ohio State	G	Erik Portillo, Michigan
Owen Power, Michigan	D	Luke Hughes, Michigan
Brock Faber, Minnesota	D	Jackson LaCombe, Minnesota
Matty Beniers, Michigan	F	Brendan Brisson, Michigan
Ben Meyers, Minnesota	F	Matthew Knies, Minnesota
Georgii Merkulov, Ohio State	F	Max Ellis, Notre Dame
Freshman Team	Position	
Jakub Dobeš, Ohio State	G	
Luke Hughes, Michigan	D	
Mason Lohrei, Ohio State	D	
Matthew Knies, Minnesota	F	
Georgii Merkulov, Ohio State	F	
Mackie Samoskevich, Michigan	F	

=== Big Ten tournament ===
Tournament MOP
Erik Portillo		Michigan
All-Tournament Team
Player	Pos	Team
Erik Portillo	G	Michigan
Jackson LaCombe	D	Minnesota
Luke Hughes	D	Michigan
Mackie Samoskevich	F	Michigan
Brendan Brisson	F	Michigan
Matty Beniers	F	Michigan

== 2022 NHL entry draft ==
Round	Pick	Player	College	NHL team
1	3	Logan Cooley^{†}	Minnesota	Arizona Coyotes
1	13	Frank Nazar^{†}	Michigan	Chicago Blackhawks
1	14	Rutger McGroarty^{†}	Michigan	Winnipeg Jets
1	23	Jimmy Snuggerud^{†}	Minnesota	St. Louis Blues
1	25	Sam Rinzel^{†}	Minnesota	Chicago Blackhawks
2	37	Ryan Chesley^{†}	Minnesota	Washington Capitals
2	46	Seamus Casey^{†}	Michigan	New Jersey Devils
3	78	Quinn Finley^{†}	Wisconsin	New York Islanders
4	100	Tyson Jugnauth^{†}	Wisconsin	Seattle Kraken
4	104	Stephen Halliday^{†}	Ohio State	Ottawa Senators
4	124	Cruz Lucius^{†}	Wisconsin	Carolina Hurricanes
6	180	Jack Sparkes^{†}	Michigan State	Los Angeles Kings
6	192	Connor Kurth^{†}	Minnesota	Tampa Bay Lightning
7	201	Owen Mehlenbacher^{†}	Wisconsin	Detroit Red Wings
7	212	Brennan Ali^{†}	Notre Dame	Detroit Red Wings
7	213	David Gucciardi	Michigan State	Washington Capitals

† incoming freshman
