= Brock Faber =

American ice hockey player (born 2002)

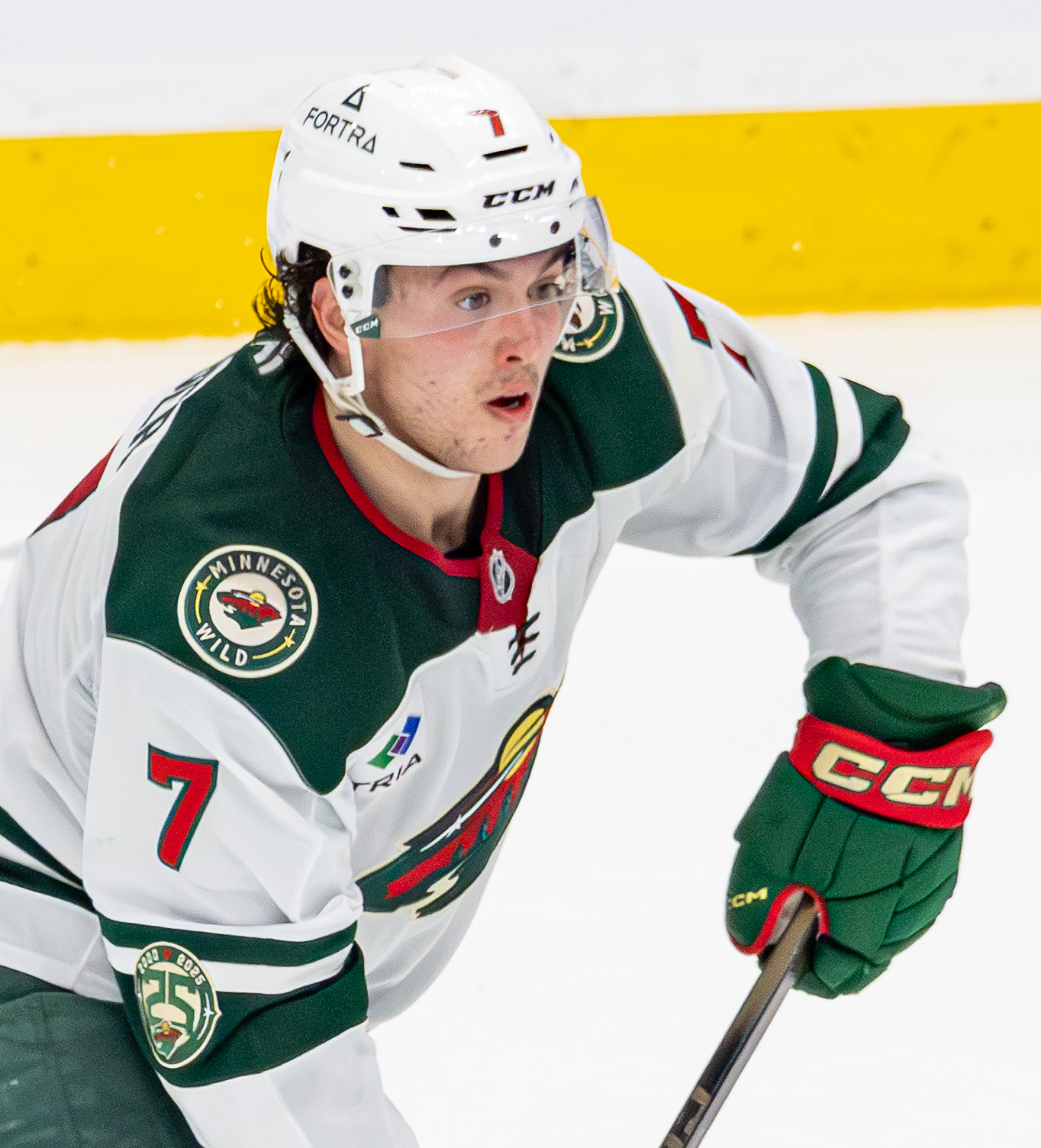
- Faber with the Minnesota Wild in 2026
- Born: August 22, 2002 (age 24) Maple Grove, Minnesota, U.S.
- Height: 6 ft 1 in (185 cm)
- Weight: 200 lb (91 kg; 14 st 4 lb)
- Position: Defense
- Shoots: Right
- NHL team: Minnesota Wild
- National team: United States
- NHL draft: 45th overall, 2020; Los Angeles Kings
- Playing career: 2022–present

Brock Roger Faber (born August 22, 2002) is an American professional hockey player who is a defenseman for the Minnesota Wild of the National Hockey League (NHL). Faber was drafted 45th overall by the Los Angeles Kings in the 2020 NHL entry draft.

== Playing career ==
=== Collegiate ===
During the 2020–21 season, his freshman year, Faber recorded one goal and 11 assists in 27 games for the University of Minnesota. Following the season, he was named to the All-Big Ten Freshman Team.

During the 2021–22 season, his sophomore year, Faber recorded two goals and 11 assists in 28 games for Minnesota. Following the season, he was named to the All-Big Ten First Team and was named Big Ten Defensive Player of the Year.

Returning to the Gophers for his junior year, Faber was named as team captain for the 2022–23 season. He recorded four goals and 27 points through 38 games, helping the Gophers reach the NCAA Championship game. Following an overtime defeat by Quinnipiac, Faber concluded his collegiate career.

=== Professional ===
Faber was drafted in the second round, 45th overall, by the Los Angeles Kings in the 2020 NHL entry draft. On June 29, 2022, Faber's NHL rights were traded by the Kings, along with a 2022 first-round selection, to the Minnesota Wild for Kevin Fiala.

On April 9, 2023, Faber was signed by the Minnesota Wild to a three-year, entry-level contract and immediately joined the roster of the playoff-bound Wild.

Faber scored his first NHL goal on October 12, 2023, in a 2–0 victory over the Florida Panthers. In January 2024, he led all rookies in points and assists, and was named Rookie of the Month. He ultimately appeared in all 82 games for the Wild and recorded eight goals and 39 assists during the season. His 39 assists were tied with Connor Bedard for most assists among rookies, while his 47 points were tied with Luke Hughes for second most points among rookies. He led rookies in ice time per game (24:58) and blocked shots (150) and was first among rookie defenseman in shots on goal (136) and even-strength points (31), and second to Hughes in power-play points (16). He set single-season franchise records for assists, points, blocked shots, and time on ice by a rookie defenseman. His total time on ice, 2,047:53, was the highest single-season figure by a rookie since the statistic began being recorded in 1997–98. Following the season he was named a finalist for the Calder Memorial Trophy and named to the NHL All-Rookie Team. On July 29, 2024, the Wild signed Faber to an eight-year, $70 million contract extension. In the 2024-25 season Faber was ranked fifth overall in the NHL and averaged 25:31 in play time. During the 2025-26 season Faber became the fastest defenseman in Minnesota Wild history to reach 50 points in a season, with 15 goals and 35 assists playing in 74 games and reaching the points in March 2026. He scored his first playoff goal on April 20 during the Wild's first-round series against the Dallas Stars, scoring during 4-on-4 in the first period.

Faber suffered a fractured skull after being hit in the head with a shot from Dallas Stars player Sam Steel during a 2026–27 season preseason game on September 25 during the second period. He returned to play for the rest of the period following evaluation by medical staff but did not return to play for the third period, with the team announcing Faber had undergone surgery on September 27 for the injury and was listed as out indefinitely. He reportedly was watching the team play against Vegas Golden Knights on October 12, where fellow Wild player Nico Sturm was hit in the head by an errant puck from captain Jared Spurgeon, and he appeared on the jumbotron to cheers from the crowd and represented the Osseo Maple Grove Association on the teams social media during the October 15 home game. Faber returned to practicing with the team on November 5 with plastic ear guards on his helmet and was expected to travel with the team for their three-game road trip starting on November 10. He returned to play on November 14 against the Boston Bruins.

== International play ==
Medal record

Men's ice hockey

Representing the United States

Olympic Games
Gold medal – first place	2026 Milano Cortina	

World Junior Championship
Gold medal – first place	2021 Canada	

Faber represented the United States junior team at the 2021 World Junior Championships, where he recorded five assists in seven games and won a gold medal. He again represented the United States at the 2022 World Junior Championships, where he appeared in one game before the tournament was canceled due to the COVID-19 pandemic.

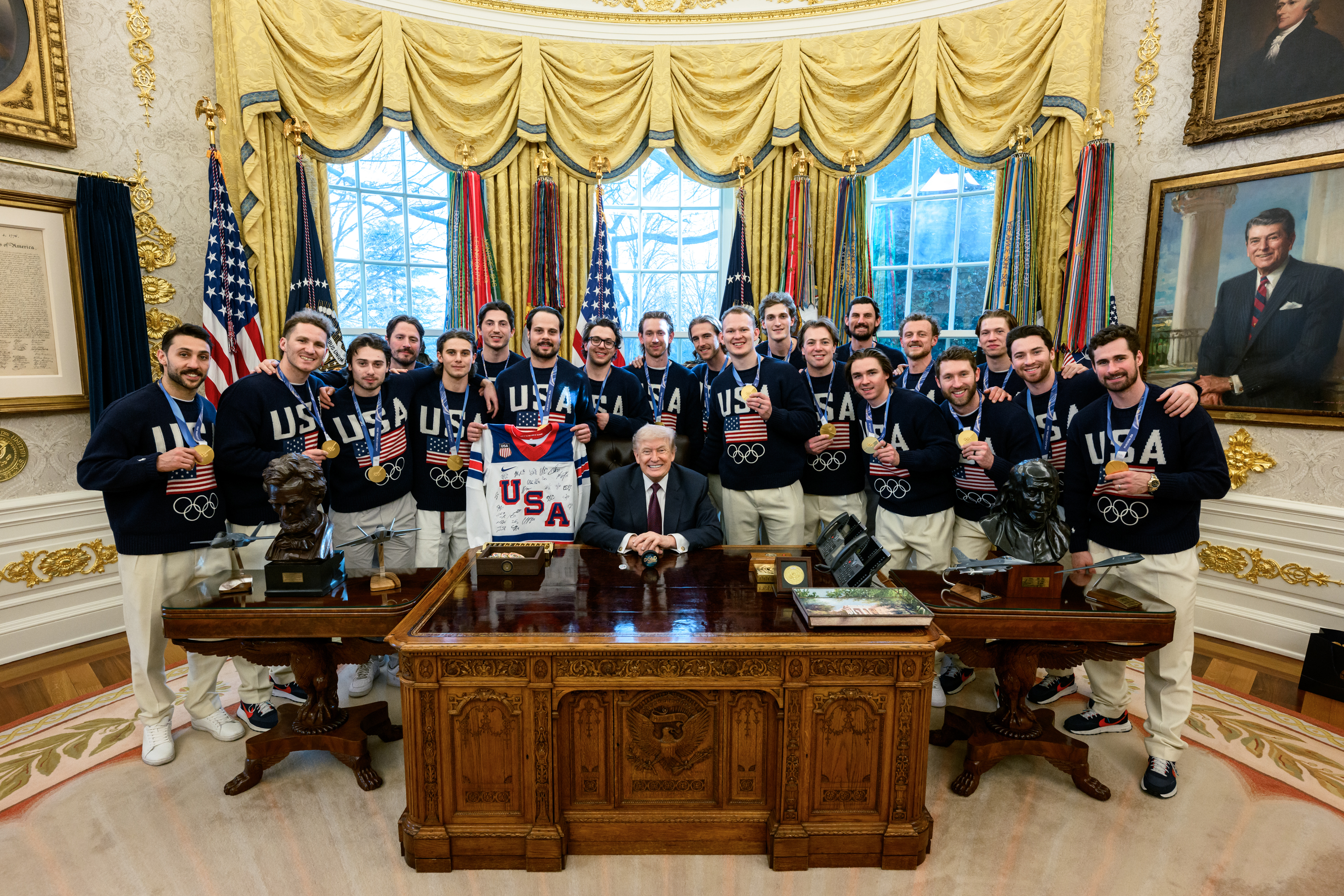
Faber posing with President Trump and teammates during White House visit in February 2026

On January 13, 2022, Faber was named to the United States senior team's roster for the 2022 Winter Olympics. During the tournament he recorded one assist in four games. Faber was named to the 2025 4-Nations rooster where he had two assists in four games.

On January 2, 2026, he was named to the U.S. team's roster for the 2026 Winter Olympics. He played in the team's six games for the tournament, contributing a goal and an assist. Amid online backlash faced by the men's Olympic hockey team regarding the inclusion of FBI director Kash Patel during their gold medal celebrations and members of the team laughing at President Trump's comments of being impeached if he did not invite the women's team to the White House, Faber was among the majority who visited with the president and attended the State of the Union.

== Personal life ==
Faber grew up a fan of his home state Minnesota Wild.

In July 2025, Faber was the Alumni Ambassador for the US National Junior team during their Summer Showcase at the request of head coach Bob Motzko, where he joined fellow players Drew Helleson, Matthew Knies and Jackson LaCombe to speak to the team.

== Career statistics ==
=== Regular season and playoffs ===
			Regular season					Playoffs
Season	Team	League	GP	G	A	Pts	PIM	GP	G	A	Pts	PIM
2018–19	US NTDP Juniors	USHL	35	3	7	10	8	2	0	0	0	0
2018–19	US NTDP U17	USDP	56	3	12	15	14	—	—	—	—	—
2018–19	US NTDP U18	USDP	1	0	0	0	2	—	—	—	—	—
2019–20	US NTDP Juniors	USHL	19	1	8	9	8	—	—	—	—	—
2019–20	US NTDP U18	USDP	46	3	9	12	16	—	—	—	—	—
2020–21	University of Minnesota	B1G	27	1	11	12	14	—	—	—	—	—
2021–22	University of Minnesota	B1G	32	2	12	14	12	—	—	—	—	—
2022–23	University of Minnesota	B1G	38	4	23	27	12	—	—	—	—	—
2022–23	Minnesota Wild	NHL	2	0	0	0	0	6	0	0	0	0
2023–24	Minnesota Wild	NHL	82	8	39	47	26	—	—	—	—	—
2024–25	Minnesota Wild	NHL	78	10	19	29	23	6	0	0	0	2
2025–26	Minnesota Wild	NHL	80	15	36	51	39	11	4	6	10	10
NHL totals			242	33	94	127	88	23	4	6	10	12

=== International ===
Year	Team	Event	Result	GP	G	A	Pts	PIM
2017	United States	U17	1st place, gold medalist(s)	5	0	2	2	4
2021	United States	WJC	1st place, gold medalist(s)	7	0	5	5	0
2022	United States	OG	5th	4	0	1	1	2
2022	United States	WJC	5th	5	1	1	2	0
2025	United States	4NF	2nd	4	0	2	2	0
2026	United States	OG	1st place, gold medalist(s)	6	1	1	2	4
Junior totals				17	1	8	9	4
Senior totals				14	1	4	5	6

== Awards and honors ==
Award	Year	Ref
College
All-Big Ten Freshman Team	2021	
All-Big Ten First Team	2022, 2023	
Big Ten Defensive Player of the Year	2022, 2023	
AHCA West First Team All-American	2023	
NHL
NHL All-Rookie Team	2024	

Awards and achievements
Preceded by Cam York	Big Ten Defensive Player of the Year; 2021–22, 2022–23	Succeeded by Artyom Levshunov
