= List of Seattle Kraken award winners =

List of awards and honors bestowed upon the Seattle Kraken or its players

Seattle Kraken awards

Team trophies
- Award*: Wins

Individual awards
- Award*: Wins
- Calder Memorial Trophy: 1

Total
- Awards won: 1

The Seattle Kraken are a professional ice hockey team based in Seattle. They are members of the Pacific Division of the National Hockey League (NHL).

As a team, the Seattle Kraken have not won any awards. Matty Beniers has won the only individual award of any Kraken in team history, the Calder Memorial Trophy, for being rookie of the year for the 2022–23 season.

The Kraken have four internal team awards—the Pete Muldoon Award, the 3 Stars of the Year Award, the Guyle Fielder Award, and the Fan Favorite Award, which are awarded to players each season.

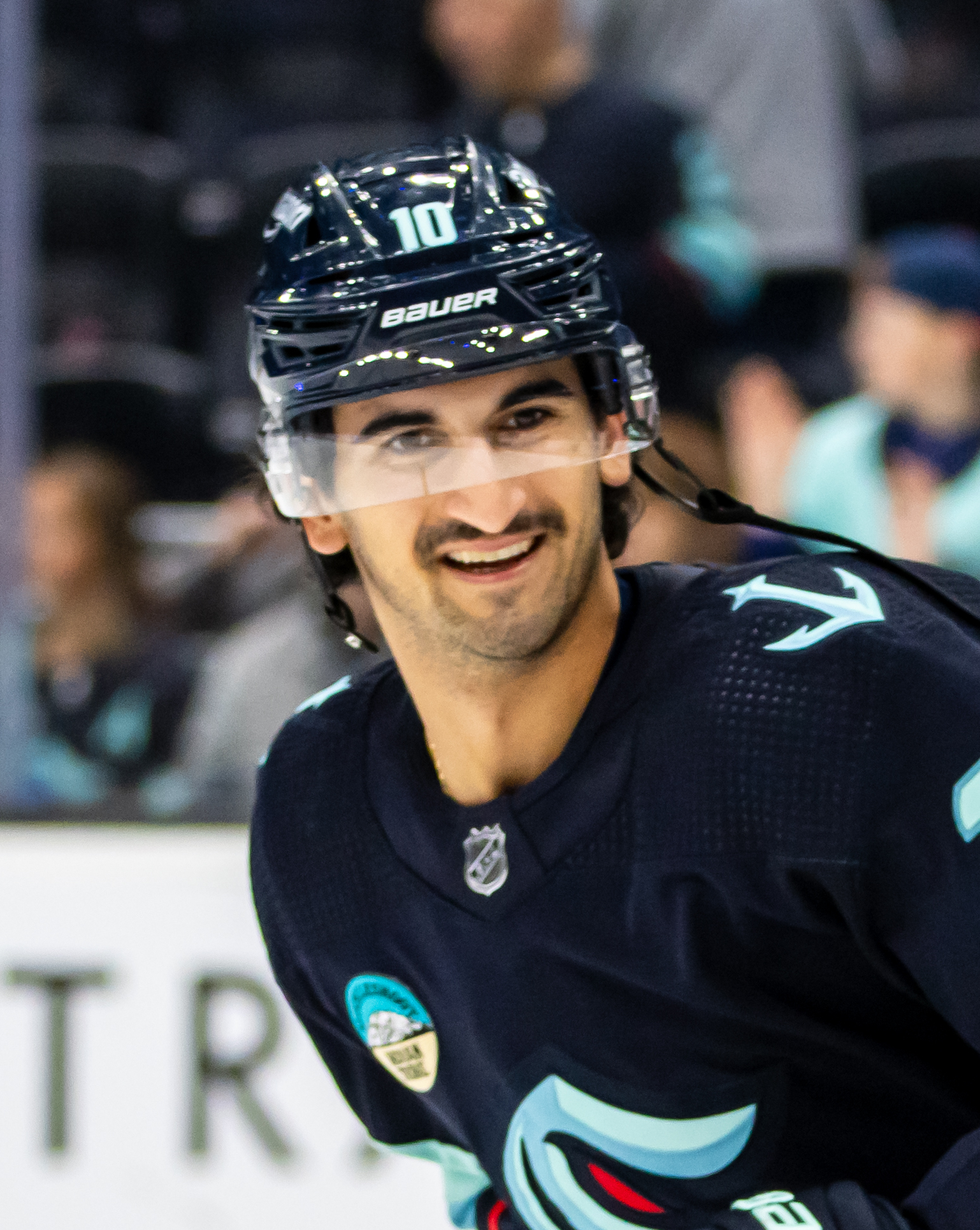
Matty Beniers, the first-ever draft pick of the Kraken, won the Calder Memorial Trophy as NHL rookie of the year at the end of the team's sophomore season.

== League awards ==
=== Team trophies ===
The Kraken have not won any of the team trophies the NHL awards annually—the Stanley Cup as winners of the Stanley Cup playoffs, the Clarence S. Campbell Bowl as winners of the Western Conference in the playoffs, or the Presidents' Trophy as the team with the most regular season standings points.

=== Individual awards ===
Following the 2022–23 season, the Kraken's Matty Beniers was named the winner of the Calder Memorial Trophy for being the NHL rookie of the year. That season, Beniers had scored 24 goals and managed 57 points, both the most out of any rookie that season, through 80 games.

Individual awards won by Seattle Kraken players and staff
Award	Description	Winner	Season	Ref.
Calder Memorial Trophy	Rookie of the year	Matty Beniers	2022–23	

== All-Stars ==
=== NHL All-Rookie Team ===
The NHL All-Rookie Team consists of the top rookies at each position (three forwards, two defenseman, and one goaltender) as voted on by the Professional Hockey Writers' Association. Matty Beniers, following his Calder Memorial Trophy-winning 2022–23 season, was selected for that season's All-Rookie Team.

Seattle Kraken players selected to the NHL All-Rookie Team
Player	Position	Season	Ref.
Matty Beniers	Center	2022–23	

=== All-Star Game selections ===
The NHL All-Star Game is a mid-season exhibition game held annually between many of the top players of each season, selected by both the NHL themselves and a fan vote. The All-Star game consists of a three-game tournament, with the winning faction receiving US$1 million. Three All-Star Games have been held since the Seattle Kraken entered the league in 2021.

Seattle Kraken players and coaches selected to the All-Star Game
Game	Year	Name	Position	Ref.
66th	2022	Jordan Eberle	Right wing	
67th	2023	Matty Beniers (did not play due to injury)	Center	
68th	2024	Oliver Bjorkstrand	Right wing	

=== All-Star Game replacement events ===
Seattle Kraken players and coaches selected to All-Star Game replacement events
Event	Year	Name	Position	References
4 Nations Face-Off	2025	Kaapo Kakko (Finland)	Right wing	

== Career achievements ==
=== Retired numbers ===
The Seattle Kraken have retired one jersey number. The number 32 was retired by the team on October 23, 2021, in recognition of the team being the 32nd to join the NHL and in honor of the 32,000 fans who placed deposits for tickets on the first possible day. Also out of circulation is the number 99, which was retired league-wide for Wayne Gretzky on February 6, 2000.

== Team awards ==
The Kraken have four team awards that they give out to members of their team at the end of each season. The Pete Muldoon Award is given to the team's most valuable player. The 3 Stars of the Year Award is an annual award which is given to the player who earned the most three stars of the game honors following each Kraken home game. The Guyle Fielder Award is an annual award which is given to the player "who best exemplifies 'perseverance, hustle and dedication' associated with a Seattle hockey legend." The award's namesake played 15 professional seasons for the Seattle Totems of the Western Hockey League. The Fan Favorite Award is determined by a vote of the Kraken's fans.

Season	Pete Muldoon Award winner	3 Stars of the Year Award winner	Guyle Fielder Award winner	Fan Favorite Award winner	Ref.
2021–22	Jared McCann	Philipp Grubauer	Yanni Gourde	Yanni Gourde	
2022–23	Vince Dunn	Jared McCann	Jaden Schwartz	Matty Beniers	
2023–24	Jared McCann	Joey Daccord	Jaden Schwartz	Joey Daccord	
2024–25	Joey Daccord	Joey Daccord	Jaden Schwartz	Brandon Montour	
2025–26	Jordan Eberle	Matty Beniers	Jordan Eberle	Philipp Grubauer	

== See also ==
- List of NHL awards
