= Knies =

Disambiguation page

Knies is a surname. Notable people with the surname include:

- Karl Knies (1821–1898), German economist
- Matthew Knies (born 2002), American ice hockey player
