= Luke Hughes (ice hockey) =

American ice hockey player (born 2003)

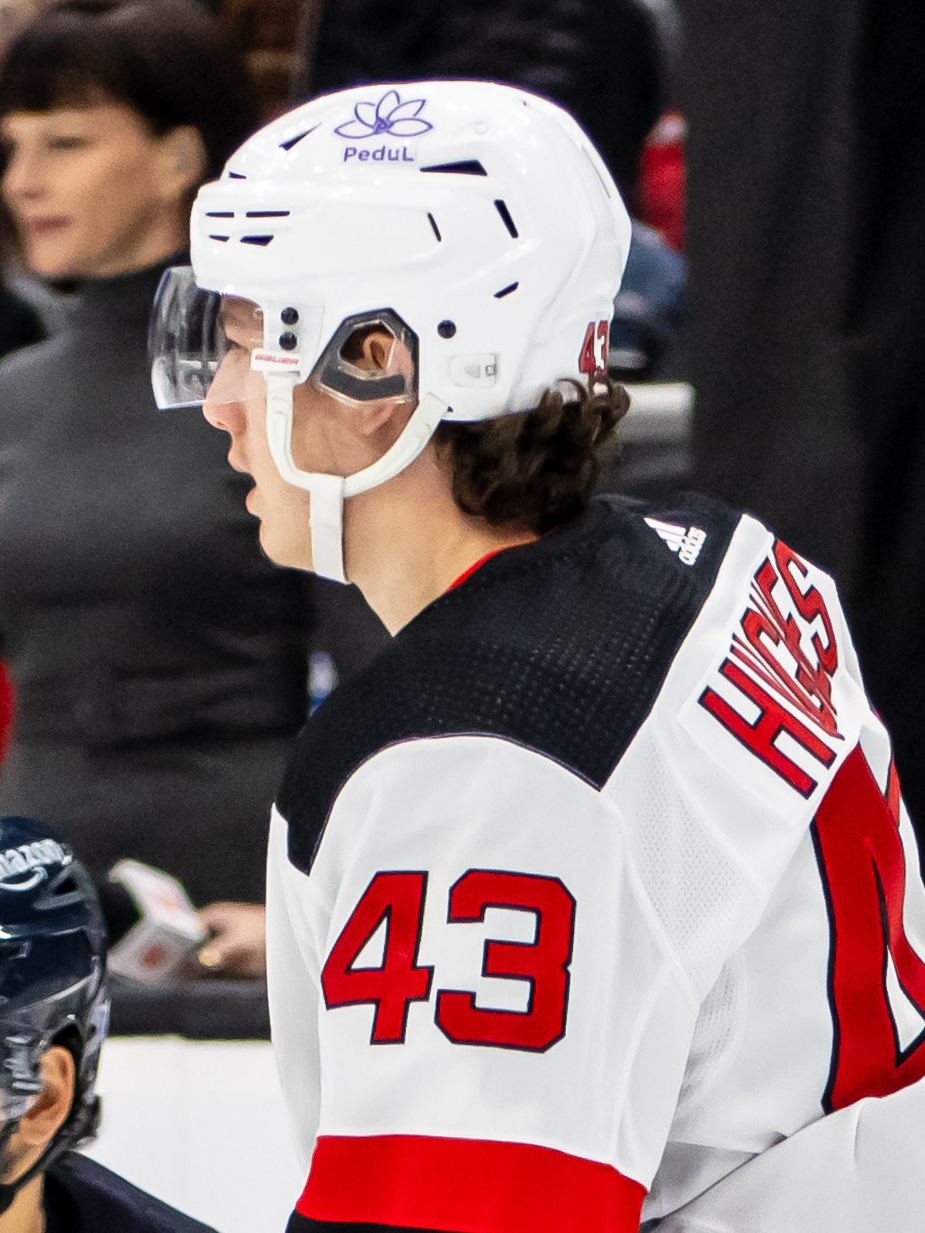
- Hughes with the New Jersey Devils in 2023
- Born: September 9, 2003 (age 23) Manchester, New Hampshire, U.S.
- Height: 6 ft 2 in (188 cm)
- Weight: 198 lb (90 kg; 14 st 2 lb)
- Position: Defense
- Shoots: Left
- NHL team: New Jersey Devils
- National team: United States
- NHL draft: 4th overall, 2021; New Jersey Devils
- Playing career: 2023–present

Luke Warren Hughes (born September 9, 2003) is an American professional ice hockey player who is a defenseman for the New Jersey Devils of the National Hockey League (NHL). He played college ice hockey for two years with the University of Michigan of the National Collegiate Athletic Association (NCAA), reaching the Frozen Four both seasons. He was selected fourth overall by the Devils in the 2021 NHL entry draft.

== Early life ==
Hughes was born on September 9, 2003, in Manchester, New Hampshire. He comes from an ice hockey-playing family. His father, Jim Hughes, is a former player and team captain for Providence College, an assistant coach for the Boston Bruins, and director of player development for the Toronto Maple Leafs.

His mother, Ellen Weinberg-Hughes, played ice hockey, lacrosse, and soccer at the University of New Hampshire. In 2012 she was inducted into the University of New Hampshire Athletics Hall of Fame, and in 2024 into the International Jewish Sports Hall of Fame. She also played for the United States women's national ice hockey team, and won a silver medal at the 1992 World Championship. Hughes and his brothers and their mother are Jewish and his father is Catholic, and the family celebrated Passover when Hughes was growing up.

His grandfather Marty was a former Marine and a battalion chief with the New York City Fire Department; he came out of retirement to assist firefighters in Queens during the September 11 attacks. His uncle Marty and his cousin, Teddy Doherty, were also both involved in ice hockey. Marty played in the ECHL and then in the British National League with the Dundee Stars, while Teddy primarily played in the ECHL. His maternal uncle is sociologist Adam S. Weinberg, the president of Denison University.

The family moved to Toronto in 2006, after Hughes' father got a job as an assistant with the Toronto Marlies of the American Hockey League (AHL), and the brothers practiced at Toronto's Wedgewood Park outdoor rink. The family also billeted William Nylander after his draft in 2014.

== Playing career ==
=== College ===
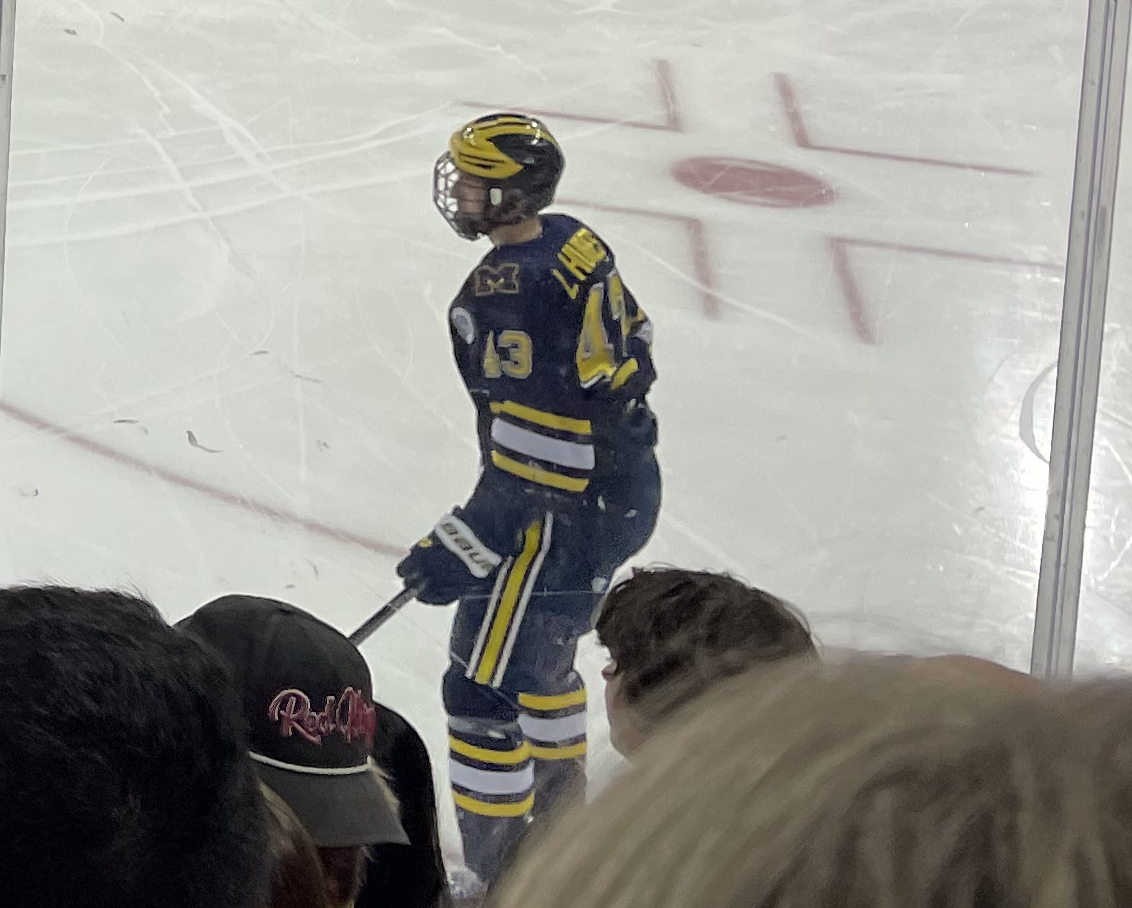
Hughes playing for the University of Michigan in a December 2022 game against the University of Wisconsin at the Kohl Center

Hughes committed to play college ice hockey for the University of Michigan during the 2021–22 season. He led the league in goals scored with 13 in conference play and recorded nine assists for 22 points, the second-most points in the league play behind Matty Beniers. Hughes led the nation's defensemen in scoring with 17 goals and 19 assists for 36 points in 37 games and is a +25. He set several Michigan program records this season. His 17 goals surpassed Dean Turner's freshman defenseman record of 13 set in 1975–76, and he passed Jack Johnson's 32 points for the most points by a Michigan freshman defenseman. In March, Hughes recorded one goal and six assists in seven games and was subsequently named the Hockey Commissioner's Association Rookie of the Month. Following an outstanding season, he was named to the All-Big Ten Freshman Team, the All-Big Ten Second Team, and was named Co-Big Ten Freshman of the Year. He was also named an AHCA West Second Team All-American.

During the 2022–23 season he led the league's defensemen in scoring with seven goals and 21 assists for 28 points, averaging 1.27 points per game. In 39 total games, he recorded 10 goals and 38 assists, ranking second in the nation in points per game by a defenseman. Following an outstanding season he was named a finalist for the Big Ten Player of the Year and Big Ten Defensive Player of the Year, and was named to the All-Big Ten First Team. He was also named an AHCA West First Team All-American.

He was considered a top prospect for the 2021 NHL entry draft. On July 23, 2021, Hughes was drafted fourth overall by the New Jersey Devils in the 2021 draft.

=== Professional ===
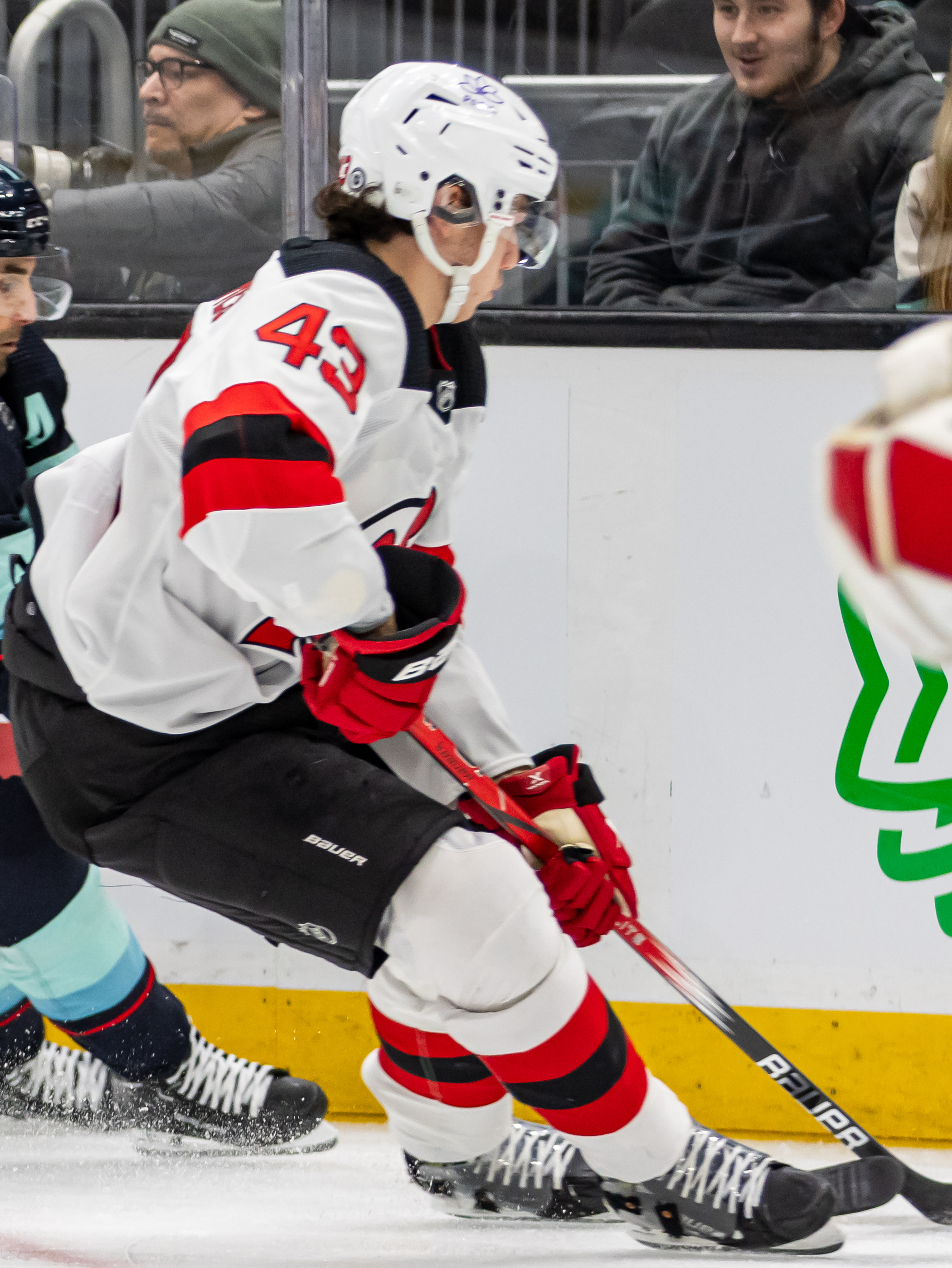
Hughes playing with the Devils in December 2023

On April 8, 2023, Hughes was signed to a three-year, entry-level contract by the New Jersey Devils. He made his National Hockey League (NHL) debut on April 11, in a 6–2 win against the Buffalo Sabres. In the game, he blocked two shots, made one hit and one takeaway and skated a total 11:15 of ice time. In the next game, Hughes recorded his first NHL goal, which was a game-winning goal, and an assist in a 5–4 overtime win against the Washington Capitals. Hughes made his playoffs debut on May 7, at home against the Carolina Hurricanes, assisting on two goals in an 8–4, Game 3 win for the Devils.

During the 2023–24 season, in his rookie season, Hughes set a franchise record for points by a rookie defenseman, recording nine goals and 47 points and playing in each of the Devils' 82 games. On April 3, 2024, against the New York Rangers, he recorded 32:49 minutes on ice, and he surpassed 24 minutes on 13 separate occasions. His 47 points were tied with Brock Faber for second-most points among rookies. Hughes led rookie defensemen in power-play points (25), power-play goals (four), goals (nine), and takeaways (42) and was second in shots (135) and ice time per game (21:28). Following the season he was named a finalist for the Calder Memorial Trophy, and was voted unanimously to the All-Rookie Team.

On October 1, 2025, before the start of the 2025–26 season, Hughes signed a seven-year, $63 million contract with the Devils as a pending restricted free agent.

Hughes was placed on long-term injured reserved in late January 2026 with an expected return after the 2026 Winter Olympics break, after being injured a few days prior during a game against the Calgary Flames. He was removed from long-term injury reserve in late February, with Colton White returning to the American Hockey League's Utica Comets. On April 9, after being eliminated from playoff contention, the Devils announced that Hughes would miss the remaining four games of the season to undergo a procedure and begin rehab. He finished the season with six goals and 35 points in 68 games.

On October 15, 2026, Hughes recorded his first NHL multi-goal game when he scored twice in a 7–1 win over the New York Rangers.

== International play ==
Medal record

Men's ice hockey

Representing the United States

World Junior Championships
Bronze medal – third place	2023 Canada	

Hughes represented the United States at the 2019 World U-17 Hockey Challenge where he recorded one goal and three assists in six games and won a silver medal.

On May 5, 2022, Hughes was named to the United States men's national ice hockey team to compete at the 2022 World Championship. He recorded one goal and three assists in ten games.

On December 12, 2022, Hughes was named to the United States men's national junior ice hockey team to compete at the 2023 World Junior Ice Hockey Championships. During the tournament, at which he served as team captain, he recorded four goals and one assist in seven games and won a bronze medal.

Hughes made his second World Championship appearance at the 2024 World Championship, recording two goals and five points in eight games. The American team was eliminated in the quarterfinals by hosts and eventual champions Czechia.

== Personal life ==
Hughes has two older brothers, Quinn, and Jack. Quinn was drafted seventh overall by the Vancouver Canucks in the 2018 NHL entry draft, while Jack was drafted first overall by the New Jersey Devils in the 2019 NHL entry draft.

Hughes and his older brother Jack announced the launch of their reading program Hughes Brothers Pucks & Pages, a multi-year reading program partnered with JAG Physical Therapy and Hockey in New Jersey, with the goal to promote literacy among New Jersey youth.

== Career statistics ==
=== Regular season and playoffs ===
			Regular season					Playoffs
Season	Team	League	GP	G	A	Pts	PIM	GP	G	A	Pts	PIM
2019–20	U.S. National Development Team	USHL	28	4	9	13	6	—	—	—	—	—
2020–21	U.S. National Development Team	USHL	18	4	11	15	8	—	—	—	—	—
2021–22	University of Michigan	B1G	41	17	22	39	10	—	—	—	—	—
2022–23	University of Michigan	B1G	39	10	38	48	26	—	—	—	—	—
2022–23	New Jersey Devils	NHL	2	1	1	2	0	3	0	2	2	0
2023–24	New Jersey Devils	NHL	82	9	38	47	28	—	—	—	—	—
2024–25	New Jersey Devils	NHL	71	7	37	44	16	1	0	0	0	0
2025–26	New Jersey Devils	NHL	68	6	29	35	32	—	—	—	—	—
NHL totals			223	23	105	128	76	4	0	2	2	0

=== International ===
Year	Team	Event	Result	GP	G	A	Pts	PIM
2019	United States	U17	2nd place, silver medalist(s)	6	1	3	4	0
2022	United States	WC	4th	10	1	3	4	0
2022	United States	WJC	5th	5	1	5	6	0
2023	United States	WJC	3rd place, bronze medalist(s)	7	4	1	5	2
2024	United States	WC	5th	8	2	3	5	2
Junior totals				18	6	9	15	2
Senior totals				18	3	6	9	2

== Awards and honors ==
Award	Year	Ref
College
Big Ten Co-Freshman of the Year	2022	
All-Big Ten Second Team	2022	
All-Big Ten Freshman Team	2022	
Big Ten All-Tournament Team	2022, 2023	
AHCA West Second Team All-American	2022	
All-Big Ten First Team	2023	
AHCA West First Team All-American	2023	
NHL
NHL All-Rookie Team	2024	
EA Sports NHL cover athlete	2025	

== See also ==
- List of select Jewish ice hockey players

Awards and achievements
Preceded by Shakir Mukhamadullin	New Jersey Devils first-round draft pick 2021	Succeeded by Chase Stillman
Preceded by Thomas Bordeleau	Big Ten Freshman of the Year; 2021–22; With: Jakub Dobeš	Succeeded by Adam Fantilli
