= Jakub Dobeš =

Czech ice hockey player (born 2001)

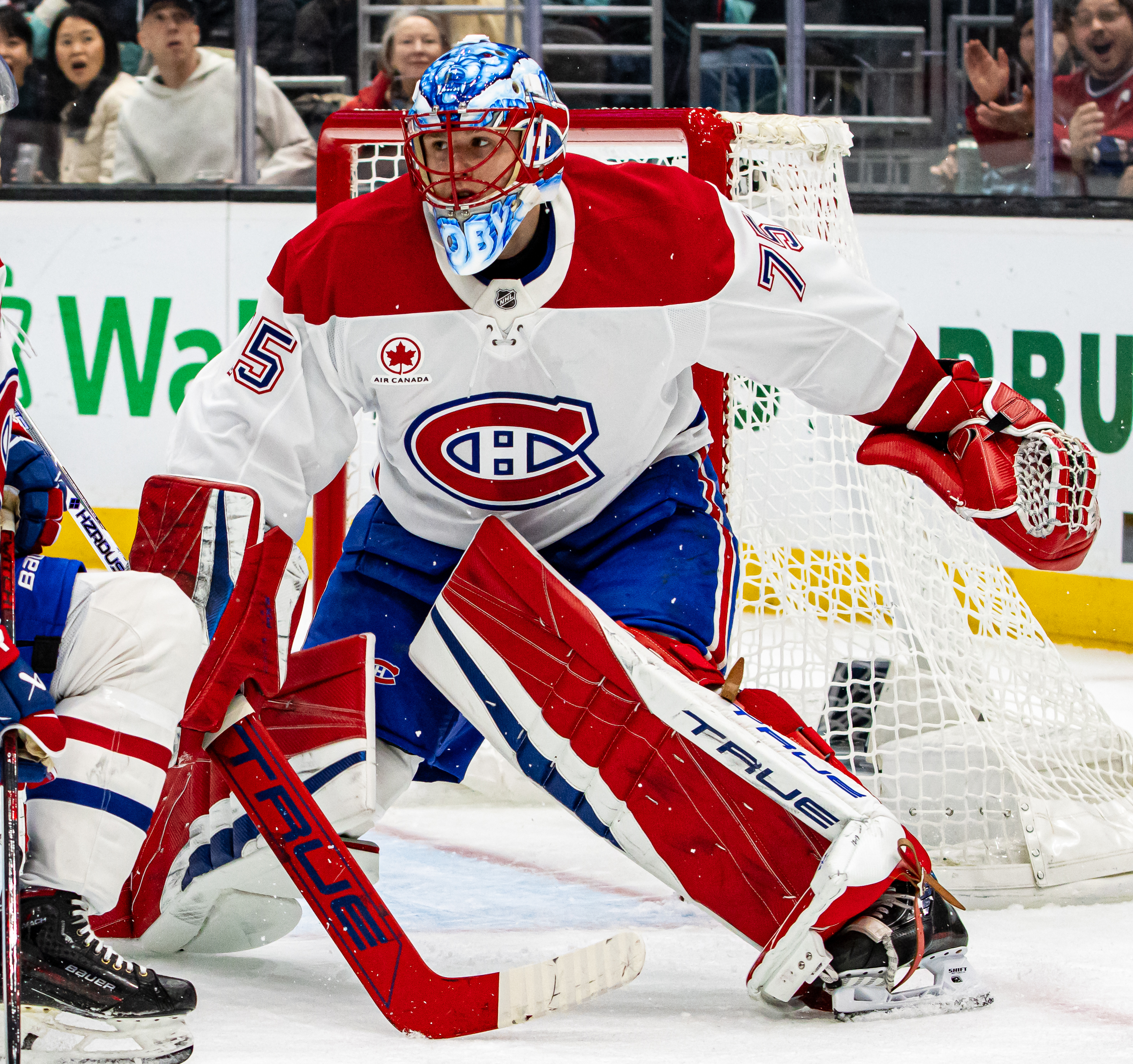
- Dobeš with the Montreal Canadiens in 2025
- Born: May 27, 2001 (age 25) Ostrava, Czech Republic
- Height: 6 ft 4 in (193 cm)
- Weight: 215 lb (98 kg; 15 st 5 lb)
- Position: Goaltender
- Catches: Left
- NHL team: Montreal Canadiens
- NHL draft: 136th overall, 2020; Montreal Canadiens
- Playing career: 2023–present

Jakub Dobeš (born May 27, 2001) is a Czech professional ice hockey player who is a goaltender for the Montreal Canadiens of the National Hockey League (NHL). He was selected in the fifth round, 136th overall, by the Canadiens in the 2020 NHL entry draft.

== Playing career ==
=== Early years ===
Dobeš began his hockey career as a goaltender with several clubs in his native Czech Republic. At age 16, believing he had limited opportunities for further development in the Czech hockey system, he moved to St. Louis, Missouri, where he lived with family friend and former St. Louis Blues forward Ľuboš Bartečko. He joined the St. Louis AAA Blues of the Tier 1 Elite Hockey League and enrolled at De Smet Jesuit High School. Following his success with both the AAA Blues and De Smet, Dobeš joined the Topeka Pilots of the North American Hockey League (NAHL). With the Pilots, he compiled a 7–3–0 record, a 1.59 goals against average (GAA), a .946 save percentage, and three shutouts. His strong performance in Topeka earned him a promotion to the Omaha Lancers of the United States Hockey League (USHL), where he played through 2021. He was named to the All-USHL Second Team before beginning his collegiate career with Ohio State in the 2021–22 season.

=== Collegiate ===
Following an outstanding freshman year with the Buckeyes, posting both a 2.26 GAA and a .934 save percentage, his efforts resulted in multiple awards, including the All-Big Ten Freshman Team, the All-Big Ten First Team, Big Ten Goaltender of the Year, and co-Big Ten Freshman of the Year, which he split with defenseman Luke Hughes. He was also named a semifinalist for the Mike Richter Award presented to the best men's goaltender across NCAA Division I ice hockey.

=== Professional ===
Selected in the fifth round (136th overall) by the Montreal Canadiens in the 2020 NHL entry draft, Dobeš signed a two-year, entry-level contract with the Canadiens on March 31, 2023. He subsequently joined Montreal's American Hockey League (AHL) affiliate the Laval Rocket to end the 2022–23 season, but did not see any playing time.

After attending the Canadiens' 2023 training camp, Dobeš was assigned to Laval to start the 2023–24 season. Initially struggling at the onset of his professional career, Dobeš allowed at least three goals in each of his first six starts. However, as the season progressed, he adjusted and became a solid fixture in the Rocket net, consistently starting as the team's top goaltender. He recorded his first AHL shutout on February 28, 2024, making 35 stops in a 4–0 win versus the Bridgeport Islanders. Despite this resurgence, the team would ultimately come up short and miss the 2024 Calder Cup playoffs. Dobeš would finish his rookie AHL campaign tied for the league lead in games played by a goaltender, with 51.

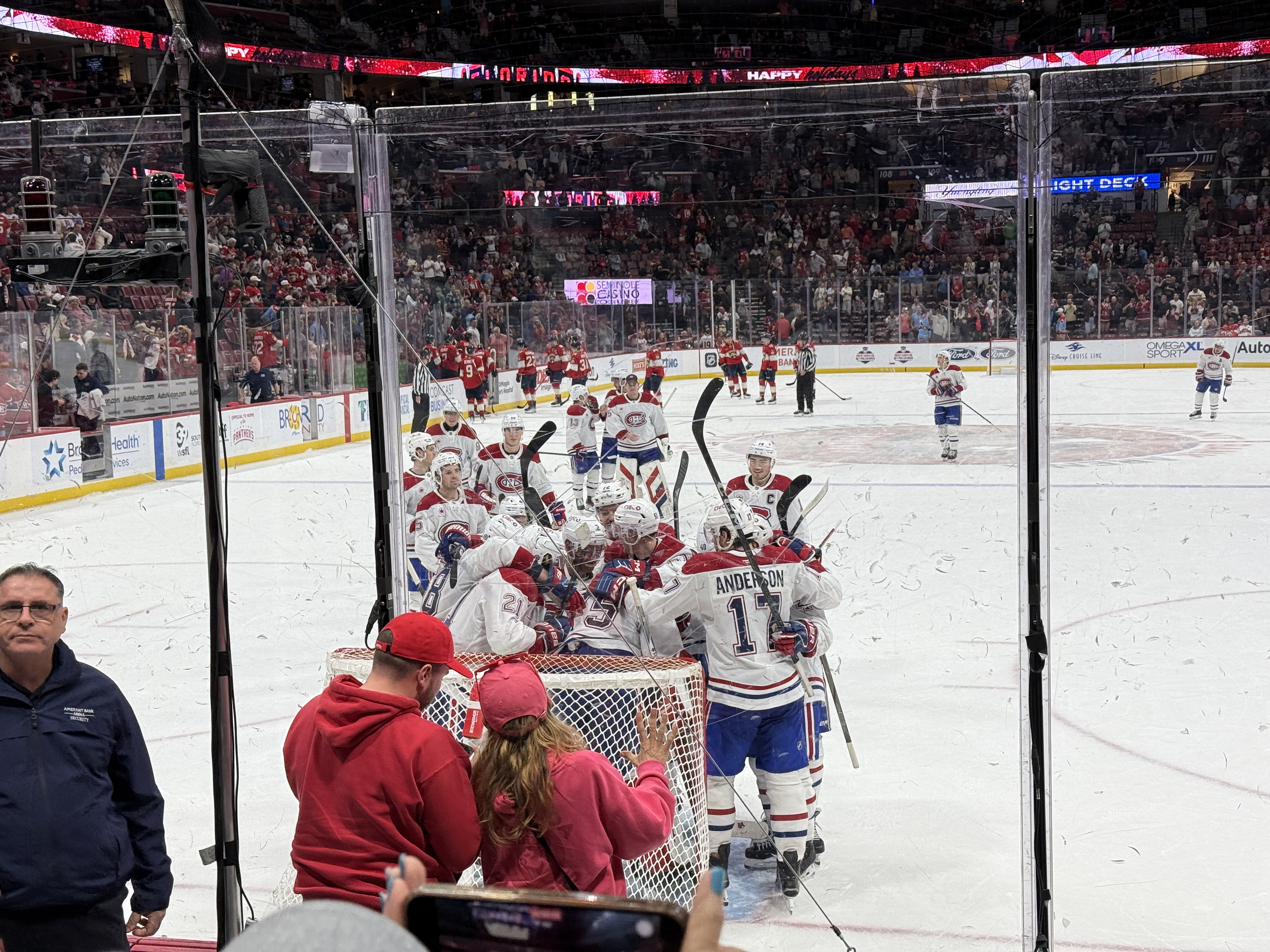
Dobeš celebrating his shutout win against the Florida Panthers on December 28, 2024

After posting a 9–3–1 record through 14 games with Laval to begin the 2024–25 season, Dobeš was recalled by the Canadiens on December 27, 2024. Team head coach Martin St. Louis announced that Dobeš would make his NHL debut against the Florida Panthers at Amerant Bank Arena on December 28. With a 34-save shutout, he became just the fourth goaltender in Canadiens franchise history to register a shutout in their NHL debut, joining Bob Perreault, Wayne Thomas, and Yann Danis. Additionally, Dobeš became the seventh goaltender in league history to record a win versus the defending Stanley Cup champion in their NHL debut, and the third to have done so via shutout, after Hal Winkler and Daren Puppa. Following a 2–1 shootout performance over the Colorado Avalanche on January 4, 2025, Dobeš made franchise history as the first Canadiens goaltender to allow one goal through his first two career NHL starts. Improving his record to 3–0–0 with a 3–2 overtime win over the Washington Capitals on January 10, he matched Bob Perreault as the only Canadiens goaltenders to allow three goals or fewer through his first three career starts with the team. A week later, Dobeš became the third goaltender in NHL history following Viktor Fasth and Martin Jones to amass four inaugural career wins while allowing four or fewer cumulative goals through the same number of appearances. Similarly, he also joined Charlie Lindgren as the only other goaltender in league history to earn wins through their first four NHL starts with each game taking place on the road. On January 19, Dobeš became the thirteenth goaltender in NHL history to go 5–0–0 over the course of his first five career games, and just the fourth goaltender born outside North America to achieve same, after Antero Niittymäki, Frederik Andersen, and Pyotr Kochetkov respectively.

Remaining as the Canadiens' backup goaltender for the duration of the regular season and into the 2025 Stanley Cup playoffs, he would appear in Game 3 of the team's first round series against the Washington Capitals after starter Sam Montembeault had to exit the game due to apparent injury. The Canadiens ultimately won 6–3, with Dobeš becoming the third netminder in franchise history to earn a playoff victory in a relief appearance, following Charlie Hodge (1955) and Rogie Vachon (1969).

Entering the off-season as a restricted free agent, Dobeš was extended a qualifying offer by the Canadiens on June 30, 2025. Thereafter, he agreed to a two-year extension with the team on July 6. With Montembeault struggling at the start of the season, Dobeš assumed a more prominent role, playing six of the team's eleven games in the first month of the season and winning all of them. He was named the NHL's third star of the month for October 2025. After this strong start, his play gradually tapered off, and by December the Canadiens recalled Jacob Fowler from Laval due to their goaltenders' difficulties. For a time, Dobeš was the least-utilized of the three. He gradually reestablished himself in the net, and became the team's starter from March onward, with Fowler as his backup. Dobeš was named the NHL's first star for the week of March 23–29, a period in which he won all three games he appeared in, allowing only four goals on 104 shots. He ultimately appeared in 43 games, with a 29–10–4 record and .901 save percentage. Dobeš was fourth in balloting for the Calder Memorial Trophy, the Professional Hockey Writers' Association's award for NHL rookie of the year, and was named to the NHL All-Rookie Team.

The Canadiens began the 2026 Stanley Cup playoffs against the Tampa Bay Lightning, with Dobeš playing a key role in a seven-game series where every game was decided by one goal. He backstopped the team to a 2–1 victory in the deciding Game 7 when they only managed 9 shots on net, while facing 29 from the Lightning. His strong play continued in the second round against Buffalo Sabres, despite getting pulled from the sixth game after allowing 6 goals on 33 shots. This series also went to seven games, with Dobeš again prevailing, making 37 saves on 39 shots in the clinching victory. The Canadiens were ultimately ousted in the Eastern Conference Final by the Carolina Hurricanes, while Dobeš finished the postseason with 9 wins and 10 losses and a .908 save percentage.

Entering the final year of his contract, Dobeš signed a three-year, $16 million contract extension with the Canadiens on July 2, 2026. Entering the season as the Canadiens' presumed starting goaltender, he recorded a season-opening win over the Toronto Maple Leafs on September 29, but struggled in October, losing his starting role to Fowler. His second win of the season came on October 29, a 5–2 victory against the Dallas Stars.

== International play ==
Dobeš represented the Czech Republic national junior team at the 2019 World Junior A Challenge, where they finished fourth place following an overtime loss to the United States in the bronze medal game.

== Personal life ==
His mother Viera is a former competitive figure skater, while his father, Zdeněk, played professional hockey for HC Olomouc and HC Vítkovice in the Czech Extraliga. He resides in St. Louis during the offseason.

== Career statistics ==
=== Regular season and playoffs ===
| | | | Regular season | | | | | | | | | Playoffs |
| Season | Team | League | GP | W | L | T/OT | MIN | GA | SO | GAA | SV% | GP | W | L | MIN | GA | SO | GAA | SV% |
|---|---|---|---|---|---|---|---|---|---|---|---|---|---|---|---|---|---|---|---|
| 2018–19 | Topeka Pilots | NAHL | 1 | 0 | 1 | 0 | 60 | 4 | 0 | 4.00 | .875 | — | — | — | — | — | — | — | — |
| 2019–20 | Topeka Pilots | NAHL | 10 | 7 | 3 | 0 | 603 | 16 | 3 | 1.59 | .946 | — | — | — | — | — | — | — | — |
| 2019–20 | Omaha Lancers | USHL | 21 | 9 | 6 | 3 | 991 | 51 | 1 | 3.09 | .891 | — | — | — | — | — | — | — | — |
| 2020–21 | Omaha Lancers | USHL | 47 | 26 | 16 | 3 | 2,588 | 107 | 2 | 2.48 | .908 | 2 | 0 | 2 | 120 | 4 | 0 | 2.10 | .923 |
| 2021–22 | Ohio State Buckeyes | B1G | 35 | 21 | 12 | 2 | 2,044 | 77 | 3 | 2.26 | .934 | — | — | — | — | — | — | — | — |
| 2022–23 | Ohio State Buckeyes | B1G | 40 | 21 | 16 | 3 | 2,361 | 91 | 2 | 2.31 | .918 | — | — | — | — | — | — | — | — |
| 2023–24 | Laval Rocket | AHL | 51 | 24 | 18 | 6 | 2,868 | 140 | 1 | 2.93 | .906 | — | — | — | — | — | — | — | — |
| 2024–25 | Laval Rocket | AHL | 14 | 9 | 3 | 1 | 812 | 33 | 0 | 2.44 | .910 | — | — | — | — | — | — | — | — |
| 2024–25 | Montreal Canadiens | NHL | 16 | 7 | 4 | 3 | 875 | 40 | 1 | 2.74 | .909 | 3 | 1 | 2 | 144 | 7 | 0 | 2.91 | .881 |
| 2025–26 | Montreal Canadiens | NHL | 43 | 29 | 10 | 4 | 2,526 | 117 | 0 | 2.78 | .901 | 19 | 9 | 10 | 1,173 | 52 | 0 | 2.66 | .908 |
| NHL totals | | | 59 | 36 | 14 | 7 | 3,400 | 157 | 1 | 2.77 | .904 | 22 | 10 | 12 | 1,317 | 59 | 0 | 2.69 | .905 |

=== International ===
| Year | Team | Event | Result | GP | W | L | OT | MIN | GA | SO | GAA | SV% |
|---|---|---|---|---|---|---|---|---|---|---|---|---|
| 2019 | Czech Republic | WJAC | 4th | 4 | 0 | 0 | 0 | 233 | 12 | 0 | 3.09 | .894 |
| Junior totals | | | | 4 | 0 | 0 | 0 | 233 | 12 | 0 | 3.09 | .894 |

== Awards and honours ==
| Award | Year | Ref |
USHL
| All-USHL Second Team | 2021 | |
College
| Big Ten Goaltender of the Year | 2022 | |
| Big Ten Co-Freshman of the Year | 2022 | |
| All-Big Ten First Team | 2022 | |
| All-Big Ten Freshman Team | 2022 | |
| All-Big Ten Honorable Mention Team | 2023 | |
NHL
| NHL All-Rookie Team | 2026 | |

Awards and achievements
| Preceded by Jack LaFontaine | Big Ten Goaltender of the Year; 2021–22 | Succeeded by Ryan Bischel |
| Preceded by Thomas Bordeleau | Big Ten Freshman of the Year; 2021–22; With: Luke Hughes | Succeeded by Adam Fantilli |
