= List of All-Big Ten Hockey Teams =

The All-Big Ten Teams are composed of players at all positions from teams that are members of the Big Ten Conference, an NCAA Division I conference. Each year, beginning in 2013–14, at the conclusion of the Big Ten regular season a media panel and the head coaches of each member team vote for players to be placed on the all-conference teams. The all-Big Ten teams are a successor to the All-CCHA Teams which were discontinued after the conference dissolved due to the 2013–14 NCAA conference realignment.

The all-conference teams are composed of one goaltender, two defensemen and three forwards. Players may only appear once per year on any of the first or second teams but freshman may appear on both the rookie team and one of the other all-conference teams.

== All-conference teams ==
=== First Team ===
==== 2010s ====
2013–14
Player	Pos	Team
Adam Wilcox	G	Minnesota
Mike Reilly	D	Minnesota
Jake McCabe	D	Wisconsin
Ryan Dzingel	F	Ohio State
Michael Mersch	F	Wisconsin
Mark Zengerle	F	Wisconsin

2014–15
Player	Pos	Team
Jake Hildebrand	G	Michigan State
Zach Werenski	D	Michigan
Mike Reilly	D	Minnesota
Zach Hyman	F	Michigan
Dylan Larkin	F	Michigan
Casey Bailey	F	Penn State

2015–16
Player	Pos	Team
Eric Schierhorn	G	Minnesota
Zach Werenski	D	Michigan
Josh Healey	D	Ohio State
J. T. Compher	F	Michigan
Kyle Connor	F	Michigan
Tyler Motte	F	Michigan

2016–17
Player	Pos	Team
Eric Schierhorn	G	Minnesota
Jake Bischoff	D	Minnesota
Vince Pedrie	D	Penn State
Mason Jobst	F	Ohio State
Justin Kloos	F	Minnesota
Tyler Sheehy	F	Minnesota

2017–18
Player	Pos	Team
Cale Morris	G	Notre Dame
Jordan Gross	D	Notre Dame
Trevor Hamilton	D	Penn State
Jake Evans	F	Notre Dame
Tanner Laczynski	F	Ohio State
Cooper Marody	F	Michigan

2018–19
Player	Pos	Team
Tommy Nappier	G	Ohio State
Quinn Hughes	D	Michigan
Bobby Nardella	D	Notre Dame
Taro Hirose	F	Michigan State
Rem Pitlick	F	Minnesota
Evan Barratt	F	Penn State

==== 2020s ====
2019–20
Player	Pos	Team
Strauss Mann	G	Michigan
Wyatt Kalynuk	D	Wisconsin
Cole Hults	D	Penn State
Cole Caufield	F	Wisconsin
Patrick Khodorenko	F	Michigan State
Nate Sucese	F	Penn State

2020–21
Player	Pos	Team
Jack LaFontaine	G	Minnesota
Cam York	D	Michigan
Jackson LaCombe	D	Minnesota
Cole Caufield	F	Wisconsin
Dylan Holloway	F	Wisconsin
Sampo Ranta	F	Minnesota

2021–22
Player	Pos	Team
Jakub Dobeš	G	Ohio State
Brock Faber	D	Minnesota
Owen Power	D	Michigan
Matty Beniers	F	Michigan
Ben Meyers	F	Minnesota
Georgii Merkulov	F	Ohio State

2022–23
Player	Pos	Team
Ryan Bischel	G	Notre Dame
Brock Faber	D	Minnesota
Luke Hughes	D	Michigan
Logan Cooley	F	Minnesota
Adam Fantilli	F	Michigan
Matthew Knies	F	Minnesota

2023–24
Player	Pos	Team
Kyle McClellan	G	Wisconsin
Seamus Casey	D	Michigan
Artyom Levshunov	D	Michigan State
Gavin Brindley	F	Michigan
Rutger McGroarty	F	Michigan
Jimmy Snuggerud	F	Minnesota

2024–25
Player	Pos	Team
Trey Augustine	G	Michigan State
Matt Basgall	D	Michigan State
Sam Rinzel	D	Minnesota
Aiden Fink	F	Penn State
Isaac Howard	F	Michigan State
Jimmy Snuggerud	F	Minnesota

2025–26
Player	Pos	Team
Trey Augustine	G	Michigan State
Matt Basgall	D	Michigan State
Ben Dexheimer	D	Wisconsin
T. J. Hughes	F	Michigan
Porter Martone	F	Michigan State
Charlie Stramel	F	Michigan State

==== First Team players by school ====
School	Winners
Minnesota	20
Michigan	19
Michigan State	11
Wisconsin	9
Ohio State	7
Penn State	7
Notre Dame	5

==== Multiple appearances ====
Player	First Team appearances
Trey Augustine	2
Matt Basgall	2
Cole Caufield	2
Brock Faber	2
Mike Reilly	2
Jimmy Snuggerud	2
Zach Werenski	2

=== Second Team ===
==== 2010s ====
2013–14
Player	Pos	Team
Joe Rumpel	G	Wisconsin
Mac Bennett	D	Michigan
Frankie Simonelli	D	Wisconsin
J. T. Compher	F	Michigan
Kyle Rau	F	Minnesota
Nic Kerdiles	F	Wisconsin

2014–15
Player	Pos	Team
Adam Wilcox	G	Minnesota
Michael Downing	D	Michigan
Travis Walsh	D	Michigan State
Andrew Copp	F	Michigan
Travis Boyd	F	Minnesota
Kyle Rau	F	Minnesota

2015–16
Player	Pos	Team
Eamon McAdam	G	Penn State
Michael Brodzinski	D	Minnesota
Vince Pedrie	D	Penn State
Hudson Fasching	F	Minnesota
Justin Kloos	F	Minnesota
Nick Schilkey	F	Ohio State

2016–17
Player	Pos	Team
Christian Frey	G	Ohio State
Josh Healey	D	Ohio State
Jake Linhart	D	Wisconsin
Trent Frederic	F	Wisconsin
Luke Kunin	F	Wisconsin
Nick Schilkey	F	Ohio State

2017–18
Player	Pos	Team
Sean Romeo	G	Ohio State
Quinn Hughes	D	Michigan
Sasha Larocque	D	Ohio State
Tony Calderone	F	Michigan
Taro Hirose	F	Michigan State
Mason Jobst	F	Ohio State

2018–19
Player	Pos	Team
Cale Morris	G	Notre Dame
Sasha Larocque	D	Ohio State
Wyatt Kalynuk	D	Wisconsin
Patrick Khodorenko	F	Michigan State
Tyler Sheehy	F	Minnesota

==== 2020s ====
2019–20
Player	Pos	Team
John Lethemon	G	Michigan State
Dennis Cesana	D	Michigan State
Jerad Rosburg	D	Michigan State
Evan Barratt	F	Penn State
Tanner Laczynski	F	Ohio State
Jake Slaker	F	Michigan

2020–21
Player	Pos	Team
Strauss Mann	G	Michigan
Owen Power	D	Michigan
Spencer Stastney	D	Notre Dame
Thomas Bordeleau	F	Michigan
Alex Steeves	F	Notre Dame
Linus Weissbach	F	Wisconsin

2021–22
Player	Pos	Team
Erik Portillo	G	Michigan
Luke Hughes	D	Michigan
Jackson LaCombe	D	Minnesota
Brendan Brisson	F	Michigan
Matthew Knies	F	Minnesota
Max Ellis	F	Notre Dame

2022–23
Player	Pos	Team
Justen Close	G	Minnesota
Jackson LaCombe	D	Minnesota
Mason Lohrei	D	Ohio State
Mackie Samoskevich	F	Michigan
Jimmy Snuggerud	F	Minnesota
Jake Wise	F	Ohio State

2023–24
Player	Pos	Team
Trey Augustine	G	Michigan State
Scooter Brickey	D	Ohio State
Ryan Chesley	D	Minnesota
Sam Rinzel	D	Minnesota
Dylan Duke	F	Michigan
Rhett Pitlick	F	Minnesota
Landon Slaggert	F	Notre Dame

2024–25
Player	Pos	Team
Arsenii Sergeev	G	Penn State
Ethan Edwards	D	Michigan
Simon Mack	D	Penn State
Quinn Finley	F	Wisconsin
T. J. Hughes	F	Michigan
Cole Knuble	F	Notre Dame

2025–26
Player	Pos	Team
Jack Ivankovic	G	Michigan
Tyler Duke	D	Michigan
Jackson Smith	D	Penn State
Michael Hage	F	Michigan
Gavin McKenna	F	Penn State
Brodie Ziemer	F	Minnesota

==== Second Team players by school ====
School	Winners
Michigan	20
Minnesota	17
Ohio State	12
Wisconsin	10
Michigan State	7
Penn State	7
Notre Dame	6

==== Multiple appearances ====
Player	Second Team appearances
Jackson LaCombe	2
Sasha Larocque	2
Kyle Rau	2
Nick Schilkey	2

=== Freshman Team ===
==== 2010s ====
2013–14
Player	Pos	Team
Christian Frey	G	Ohio State
Michael Downing	D	Michigan
Drew Brevig	D	Ohio State
J. T. Compher	F	Michigan
Hudson Fasching	F	Minnesota
Nick Schilkey	F	Ohio State

2014–15
Player	Pos	Team
Not Awarded	G	—N/a
Zach Werenski	D	Michigan
Josh Jacobs	D	Michigan State
Dylan Larkin	F	Michigan
Matthew Weis	F	Ohio State
Scott Conway	F	Penn State

2015–16
Player	Pos	Team
Eric Schierhorn	G	Minnesota
Zach Osburn	D	Michigan State
Vince Pedrie	D	Penn State
Kyle Connor	F	Michigan
Mason Jobst	F	Ohio State
Luke Kunin	F	Wisconsin

2016–17
Player	Pos	Team
Peyton Jones	G	Penn State
Ryan Lindgren	D	Minnesota
Kris Myllari	D	Penn State
Trent Frederic	F	Wisconsin
Rem Pitlick	F	Minnesota
Denis Smirnov	F	Penn State

2017–18
Player	Pos	Team
Tommy Nappier	G	Ohio State
Quinn Hughes	D	Michigan
Wyatt Kalynuk	D	Wisconsin
Mitchell Lewandowski	F	Michigan State
Casey Mittelstadt	F	Minnesota
Linus Weissbach	F	Wisconsin

2018–19
Player	Pos	Team
Drew DeRidder	G	Michigan State
Dennis Cesana	D	Michigan State
K'Andre Miller	D	Wisconsin
Michael Graham	F	Notre Dame
Gustaf Westlund	F	Ohio State
Sammy Walker	F	Minnesota

==== 2020s ====
2019–20
Player	Pos	Team
Jared Moe	G	Minnesota
Jackson LaCombe	D	Minnesota
Cam York	D	Michigan
John Beecher	F	Michigan
Cole Caufield	F	Wisconsin
Ben Meyers	F	Minnesota

2020–21
Player	Pos	Team
Cameron Rowe	G	Wisconsin
Brock Faber	D	Minnesota
Owen Power	D	Michigan
Matty Beniers	F	Michigan
Thomas Bordeleau	F	Michigan
Kent Johnson	F	Michigan

2021–22
Player	Pos	Team
Jakub Dobeš	G	Ohio State
Luke Hughes	D	Michigan
Mason Lohrei	D	Ohio State
Mackie Samoskevich	F	Michigan
Matthew Knies	F	Minnesota
Georgii Merkulov	F	Ohio State

2022–23
Player	Pos	Team
Seamus Casey	D	Michigan
Luke Mittelstadt	D	Minnesota
Logan Cooley	F	Minnesota
Adam Fantilli	F	Michigan
Jimmy Snuggerud	F	Minnesota

2023–24
Player	Pos	Team
Trey Augustine	G	Michigan State
Artyom Levshunov	D	Michigan State
Sam Rinzel	D	Minnesota
Aiden Fink	F	Penn State
Oliver Moore	F	Minnesota
Garrett Schifsky	F	Michigan

2024–25
Player	Pos	Team
Cameron Korpi	G	Michigan
Cade Christenson	D	Penn State
Logan Hensler	F	Wisconsin
Charlie Cerrato	F	Penn State
Michael Hage	F	Michigan
Gavin Morrissey	F	Wisconsin

2024–25
Player	Pos	Team
Jack Ivankovic	G	Michigan
Luke Osburn	D	Wisconsin
Jackson Smith	D	Penn State
Jake Karabela	F	Ohio State
Porter Martone	F	Michigan State
Gavin McKenna	F	Penn State

==== All-Freshman Team players by school ====
School	Winners
Michigan	20
Minnesota	16
Ohio State	11
Penn State	10
Wisconsin	10
Michigan State	8
Notre Dame	1

== See also ==
- Big Ten Awards
- All-CCHA Teams
- All-WCHA Teams
