= Owen Power =

Canadian ice hockey player (born 2002)

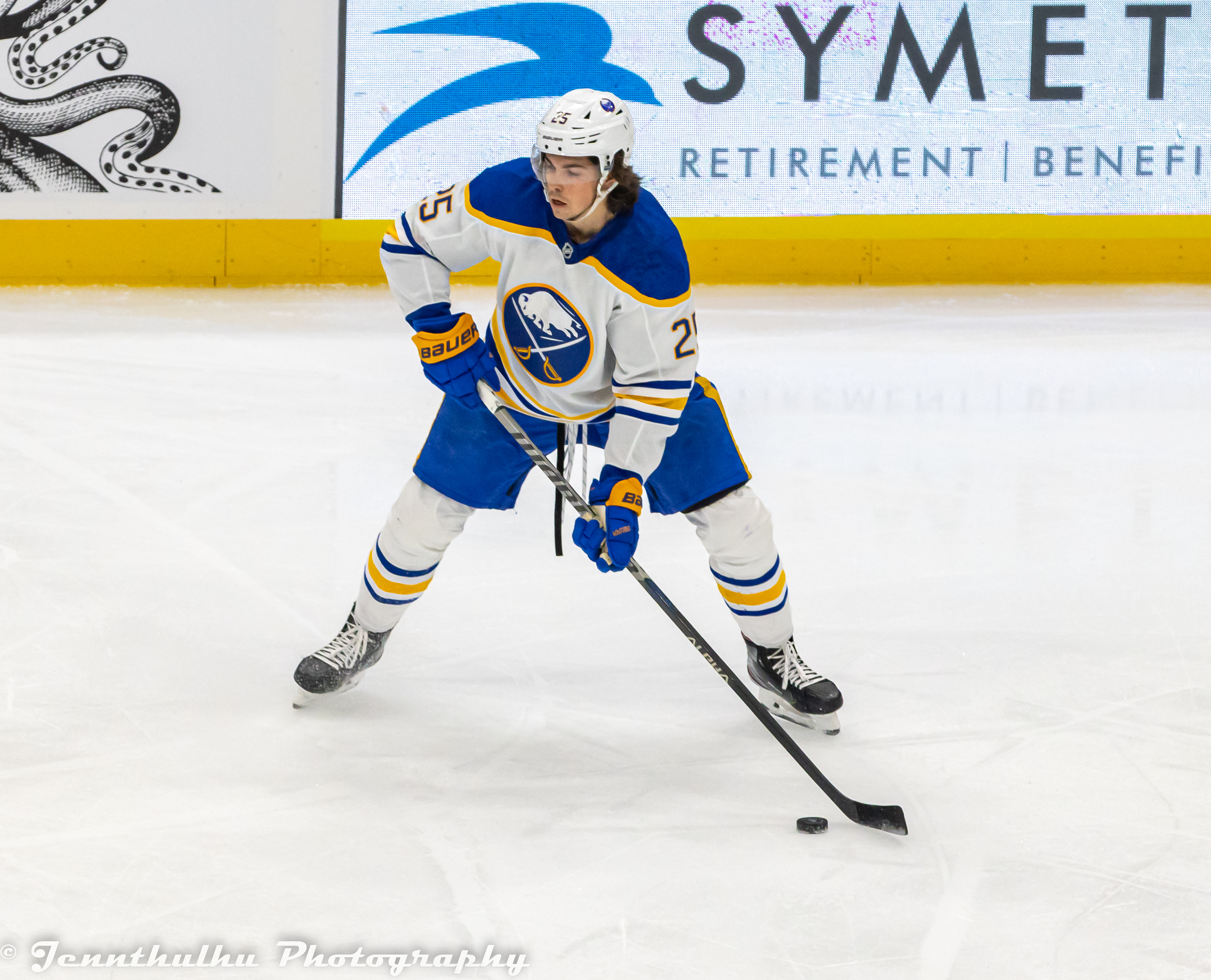
- Power with the Buffalo Sabres in 2022
- Born: November 22, 2002 (age 23) Mississauga, Ontario, Canada
- Height: 6 ft 6 in (198 cm)
- Weight: 221 lb (100 kg; 15 st 11 lb)
- Position: Defence
- Shoots: Left
- NHL team: Buffalo Sabres
- National team: Canada
- NHL draft: 1st overall, 2021; Buffalo Sabres
- Playing career: 2022–present

Owen Power (born November 22, 2002) is a Canadian professional ice hockey player who is a defenceman for the Buffalo Sabres of the National Hockey League (NHL). He was selected first overall by the Sabres in the 2021 NHL entry draft. Power played college ice hockey for Michigan of the National Collegiate Athletic Association (NCAA).

== Playing career ==
=== Junior ===
Power grew up in Mississauga, Ontario. When he became eligible as a junior player, he was selected by the Flint Firebirds of the Ontario Hockey League in the second round of the 2018 OHL draft and by the Chicago Steel of the United States Hockey League (USHL) in the first round of the 2018 USHL draft. Power opted to join the Steel to retain his NCAA eligibility as he had already verbally committed to playing for the University of Michigan. As a rookie with the Steel in the 2018–19 season, he was named to the end-of-season All-Rookie Second Team as the Steel advanced to the Clark Cup finals. He was then the 2019–20 USHL Defenceman of the Year and led the league's defenceman with 40 points as the Steel earned the regular season title in the COVID-19 pandemic-shortened season.

=== Collegiate ===
Power joined Michigan for the 2020–21 NCAA season, which ended with the team being forced to withdraw from the postseason due to positive tests for COVID-19. He was considered one of the top prospects for the 2021 NHL entry draft. He was selected for the Hockey Canada selection camp.

Power was selected first overall in the 2021 NHL entry draft by the Buffalo Sabres, though he elected to return to Michigan for his sophomore season, becoming the first number one overall pick to play college ice hockey since Erik Johnson in 2006. During the 2021–22 season in his sophomore year, he recorded three goals and 24 assists for 27 points in 29 games. He also had a team-best 44 blocked shots. Before leaving for the Olympics, he led the nation's defencemen in points per game. Following an outstanding season, he was named to the All-Big Ten First Team and was named a finalist for the Big Ten Defensive Player of the Year. He was also named an AHCA West Second Team All-American.

=== Professional ===
On April 8, 2022, Power signed a three-year, entry-level contract with the Sabres. Power made his NHL debut on April 12, in a 5–2 win over the Toronto Maple Leafs, and recorded his first point, an assist on a goal by Alex Tuch, two days later in a 6–2 loss to the St. Louis Blues. Power scored his first NHL goal on April 21, in a 5–2 win over the New Jersey Devils.

Playing his first full season with the Sabres, Power registered four goals and 31 assists in 79 games. He led all rookie defencemen in both assists and points, and was voted a finalist for the Calder Memorial Trophy.

On October 11, 2023, Power signed a seven-year, $58.45 million contract extension with the Sabres.

During the 2026 Stanley Cup playoffs, he became the first Sabres' player to earn an assist in his first four career playoff games after he assisted on a Bowen Byram goal during the first period of game 4 against the Boston Bruins on April 26, 2026. He also was the third defenceman in NHL history to tally an assist in each of his first four career playoff games (Ron Stackhouse (1975) and Joe Micheletti (1981)).

== International play ==
Medal record

Men's ice hockey

Representing Canada

World Championships
Gold medal – first place	2021 Latvia	

Power represented Canada senior team at the 2021 World Championship, where he recorded three assists in 10 games and won a gold medal. He also represented Canada junior team at the 2022 World Junior Championships. During the first game of the preliminary round of December 26, 2021, he became the first Canadian defenceman in World Juniors history to score a hat-trick. However, the World Junior Championship was shortly thereafter cancelled following COVID-19 pandemic spread.

With the NHL opting not to participate in the 2022 Winter Olympics, Power was one of a number of young players named to Canada's roster to represent the team at the Olympic tournament. The event proved a disappointment for the Canadian team, who were ousted in the quarterfinal by Sweden.

Following the 2023–24 NHL regular season, with the Sabres not qualifying for the 2024 Stanley Cup playoffs, Power rejoined Canada for the 2024 World Championship.

== Personal life ==
Power has an older sister, Emily, who plays lacrosse at the University of Guelph, and a younger brother, Adam. In high school, Power also played basketball, volleyball, and lacrosse, and was a three-time national champion in lacrosse. He has stated that lacrosse helped him in ice hockey, as he would learn how to find space in the attacking zone. On July 12, 2025, Power married his wife, Victoria, in a traditional church wedding. Power is a devout Catholic.

== Career statistics ==
=== Regular season and playoffs ===
			Regular season					Playoffs
Season	Team	League	GP	G	A	Pts	PIM	GP	G	A	Pts	PIM
2017–18	Mississauga Reps	GTHL	32	9	24	33	12	—	—	—	—	—
2018–19	Chicago Steel	USHL	58	11	14	25	10	11	0	2	2	6
2019–20	Chicago Steel	USHL	45	12	28	40	18	—	—	—	—	—
2020–21	University of Michigan	B1G	26	3	13	16	6	—	—	—	—	—
2021–22	University of Michigan	B1G	33	3	29	32	12	—	—	—	—	—
2021–22	Buffalo Sabres	NHL	8	2	1	3	2	—	—	—	—	—
2022–23	Buffalo Sabres	NHL	79	4	31	35	24	—	—	—	—	—
2023–24	Buffalo Sabres	NHL	76	6	27	33	28	—	—	—	—	—
2024–25	Buffalo Sabres	NHL	79	7	33	40	16	—	—	—	—	—
2025–26	Buffalo Sabres	NHL	81	8	21	29	16	13	0	6	6	0
NHL totals			323	27	113	140	86	13	0	6	6	0

=== International ===
Year	Team	Event	Result	GP	G	A	Pts	PIM
2018	Canada White	U17	4th	5	0	0	0	2
2021	Canada	WC	1st place, gold medalist(s)	10	0	3	3	4
2022	Canada	OG	6th	5	0	1	1	2
2024	Canada	WC	4th	10	1	5	6	0
Junior totals				5	0	0	0	2
Senior totals				25	1	9	10	6

== Awards and honours ==
Award	Year	Ref
USHL
All-Rookie Second Team	2019	
All-USHL First Team	2020	
Defenseman of the Year	2020	
College
All-Big Ten Second Team	2021	
All-Big Ten Freshman Team	2021	
All-Big Ten First Team	2022	
AHCA West Second Team All-American	2022	
NHL
NHL All-Rookie Team	2023	

Awards and achievements
Preceded by Alexis Lafrenière	NHL first overall draft pick 2021	Succeeded by Juraj Slafkovský
Preceded by Jack Quinn	Buffalo Sabres first-round draft pick 2021	Succeeded by Isak Rosén
