= Georgii Merkulov =

Russian ice hockey player (born 2000)

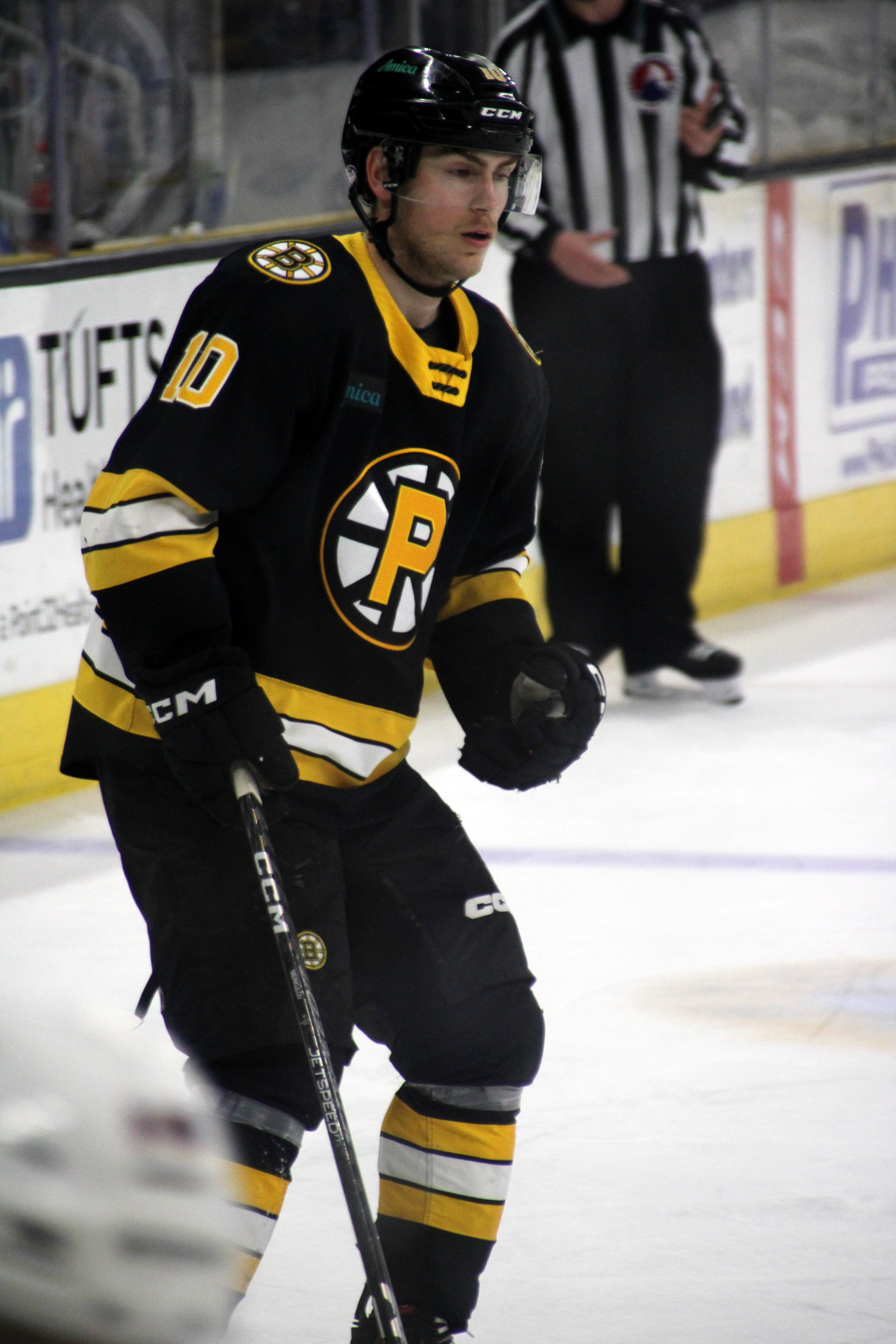
- Merkulov with the Providence Bruins in 2023
- Born: October 10, 2000 (age 26) Ryazan, Russia
- Height: 5 ft 11 in (180 cm)
- Weight: 181 lb (82 kg; 12 st 13 lb)
- Position: Forward
- Shoots: Left
- NHL team (P) Cur. team Former teams: Colorado Avalanche; Colorado Eagles (AHL); Boston Bruins
- NHL draft: Undrafted
- Playing career: 2019–present

Georgii Gennadievich Merkulov (Russian: Георгий Геннадьевич Меркулов; born October 10, 2000) is a Russian professional ice hockey forward for the Colorado Eagles in the American Hockey League (AHL) while under contract with the Colorado Avalanche of the National Hockey League (NHL). He previously played college ice hockey for Ohio State University of the National Collegiate Athletic Association (NCAA).

Merkulov is the all-time point and assists leader for the Providence Bruins, the American Hockey League (AHL) affiliate of the Boston Bruins, with 240 points and 146 assists.

== Playing career ==
=== Collegiate ===
Merkulov committed to play college ice hockey for Ohio State University during the 2021–22 season. In his freshman year, he led all NCAA freshmen with 20 goals, and was named to the All-Big Ten Freshman Team and the All-Big Ten First Team.

=== Professional ===
==== Boston Bruins ====
On 9 April 2022, Merkulov concluded his collegiate career after he was signed to a three-year, entry-level contract with the Boston Bruins, and was assigned to their AHL affiliate, the Providence Bruins, where he would play for the remainder of the season.

On 12 April 2023, after his first full professional season with the Providence Bruins, Merkulov was named to the AHL All-Rookie Team. He was second among AHL rookies in points with 55, which also led the Bruins, as well as leading the Bruins with 23 goals.

Once again impressing in Providence during the 2023–24 season, Merkulov earned a call-up to the NHL club on 29 December 2023. He would make his NHL debut the next day against the New Jersey Devils. Merkulov played four games with the team before being sent back to Providence on 5 January 2024. He did not record a point in his first stint. On 10 January 2024, Merkulov was named as Providence's representation in the 2024 AHL All Star Classic. Merkulov had yet another successful season in the AHL, as he led the P-Bruins with goals and points, with 30 and 65, respectively. He was also second on the team in assists. His 30 goals were tied for sixth in the AHL, and his 65 points had him tied for fifth in the league. Although Merkulov would score three assists in four games in the team's first round matchup in the 2024 Calder Cup playoffs against the Hartford Wolf Pack, the Bruins would fall to the Wolf Pack in four games for the second straight year.

After starting the 2024-25 season in Providence again, Merkulov was called up on 16 November 2024. He would score his first NHL point that same day against the St. Louis Blues, an assist on a Trent Frederic goal. He would play two more games in Boston before being sent back down to Providence. Merkulov once again had a successful offensive season in Providence. Despite a small downtick in goals, heading into April, Merkulov led the P-Bruins in both assists and total points. However, on 4 April 2025, against the Charlotte Checkers, Merkulov suffered an upper-body injury, later revealed to be a broken collarbone. The injury was originally announced to keep Merkulov out the rest of the regular season, however, it would keep him out of playoff play as well. Despite the injury, Merkulov finished the season as the Bruins leader in assists, as well as their leading point-scorer. Merkulov became the first player in team history to lead the team in points for three consecutive seasons.

On 30 June 2025, Merkulov signed a one-year, two-way extension worth $775,000 at the NHL level with the Bruins.

Before the 2025–26 season, Merkulov was placed on waivers by the Bruins for purpose of assignment to Providence. He later cleared waivers, starting his season off in Providence. Merkulov continued to produce in the AHL, and was called up to the NHL on 28 November 2025, playing one game for the team before being sent back to Providence on December 1. On 1 February 2026, Merkulov scored his 211th point for the Providence Bruins, becoming the franchise's all-time leading scorer, passing Andy Hilbert. Merkulov would continue his scoring ways with Providence, and finished the season second on the team in goals with 24, and first in assists with 37. His 61 points led the Bruins, marking the fourth consecutive season he led the team in points. His success helped lead Providence to the Macgregor Kilpatrick Trophy, given to the team with the most points during the regular season. Despite this success, Merkulov and the Bruins would be upset in the first round by the Springfield Thunderbirds, losing in four games. Merkulov scored one goal in the series.

==== Colorado Avalanche ====
On 20 July 2026, Merkulov signed a one-year, two-way contract with the Colorado Avalanche for the 2026–27 season.

== Career statistics ==
			Regular season					Playoffs
Season	Team	League	GP	G	A	Pts	PIM	GP	G	A	Pts	PIM
2017–18	Kapitan Stupino	MHL	34	4	9	13	18	—	—	—	—	—
2018–19	Kapitan Stupino	MHL	64	22	24	46	18	—	—	—	—	—
2019–20	Kapitan Stupino	MHL	10	1	1	2	6	—	—	—	—	—
2019–20	HC Tambov	VHL	6	0	0	0	0	—	—	—	—	—
2019–20	Youngstown Phantoms	USHL	36	6	27	33	4	—	—	—	—	—
2020–21	Youngstown Phantoms	USHL	38	14	26	40	14	—	—	—	—	—
2021–22	Ohio State University	B1G	36	20	14	34	10	—	—	—	—	—
2021–22	Providence Bruins	AHL	8	1	4	5	8	1	0	0	0	0
2022–23	Providence Bruins	AHL	67	24	31	55	26	4	0	1	1	0
2023–24	Providence Bruins	AHL	67	30	35	65	20	4	0	3	3	2
2023–24	Boston Bruins	NHL	4	0	0	0	0	—	—	—	—	—
2024–25	Providence Bruins	AHL	59	15	39	54	16	—	—	—	—	—
2024–25	Boston Bruins	NHL	6	0	1	1	2	—	—	—	—	—
2025–26	Providence Bruins	AHL	70	24	37	61	38	4	1	0	1	0
2025–26	Boston Bruins	NHL	1	0	0	0	0	—	—	—	—	—
NHL totals			11	0	1	1	2	—	—	—	—	—

== Awards and honors ==
Award	Year
College
All-Big Ten First Team	2022
All-Big Ten Freshman Team	2022
AHL
AHL All-Rookie Team	2023
All-Star Classic	2024
