= Jackson LaCombe =

American ice hockey player (born 2001)

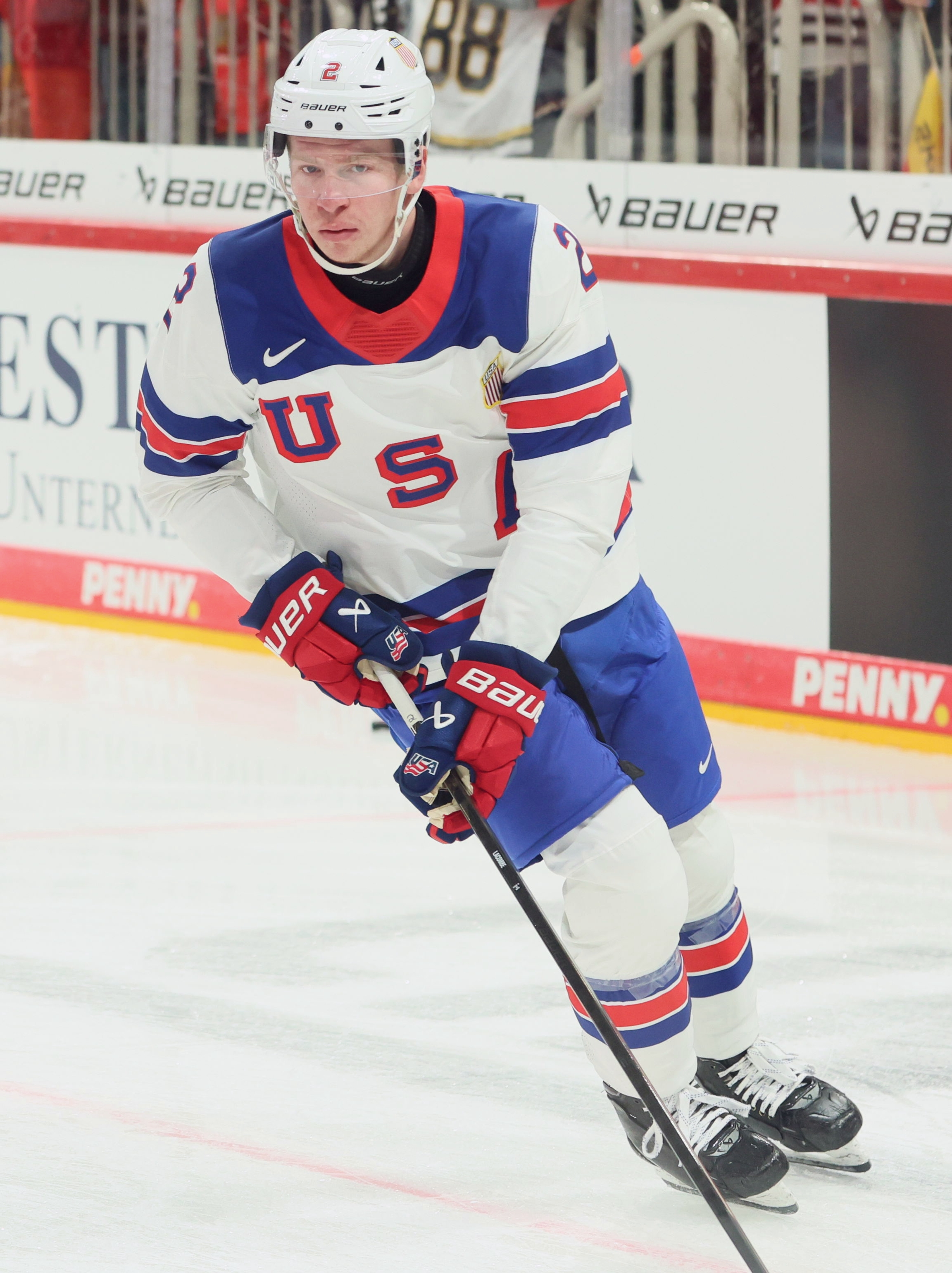
- LaCombe with the United States in 2025
- Born: January 9, 2001 (age 25) Eden Prairie, Minnesota, U.S.
- Height: 6 ft 2 in (188 cm)
- Weight: 208 lb (94 kg; 14 st 12 lb)
- Position: Defense
- Shoots: Left
- NHL team: Anaheim Ducks
- National team: United States
- NHL draft: 39th overall, 2019; Anaheim Ducks
- Playing career: 2023–present

Jackson Trevor LaCombe (born January 9, 2001) is an American professional ice hockey player who is a defenseman and alternate captain for the Anaheim Ducks of the National Hockey League (NHL). LaCombe was drafted 39th overall by the Ducks in the 2019 NHL entry draft and made his NHL debut with the team in 2023. Internationally he has played for the American national team at multiple tournaments, winning a gold medal at the 2025 World Championships, and being named to the team for the gold medal-winning team at the 2026 Winter Olympics, though he did not play at the latter.

== Playing career ==
=== High school ===
LaCombe attended Shattuck-Saint Mary's where he helped SSM win the 2016 USA Hockey Youth Tier I 14 U national championship. During his senior year in the 2018–19 season, he set a school record for points by a defenseman with 89 points.

=== Collegiate ===
LaCombe began his collegiate career for the Minnesota Golden Gophers during the 2019–20 season. During freshman year he recorded three goals and 10 assists in 37 games and led all Big Ten freshman defenseman with 61 blocked shots and ranked second in scoring. He was subsequently named to the Big Ten All-Freshman Team.

During the 2020–21 season, his sophomore year, he recorded four goals and 17 assists in 27 games. Following an outstanding season, he was named to the All-Big Ten First Team and named an AHCA Second Team All-American.

=== Professional ===
On April 10, 2023, LaCombe was signed by the Anaheim Ducks to a two-year, entry-level contract. On April 11, he made his NHL debut against the Vancouver Canucks in a 3–2 loss. On January 20, 2024, LaCombe scored his first NHL goal against the San Jose Sharks in a 5–3 loss. On October 2, 2025, LaCombe signed an eight-year extension with the Ducks, taking effect at the start of the 2026–27 season.

== International play ==
Medal record

Men's ice hockey

Representing the United States

Olympic Games
Gold medal – first place	2026 Milano Cortina	

World Championships
Gold medal – first place	2025 Sweden/Denmark	

World Junior Championships
Gold medal – first place	2021 Canada	

LaCombe represented the United States at the 2021 World Junior Championships, where he recorded one assist in six games and won a gold medal.

LaCombe made his senior national team debut for the United States at the 2025 World Championship, where he recorded two goals and three assists in 10 games and helped the United States win their first gold medal since 1933.

On January 21, 2026, he was named to the United States' roster for the 2026 Winter Olympics, replacing the injured Seth Jones. Although he dressed for the games, he was in the final roster and joined the team in the podium to get his gold medal, LaCombe did not play through the competition. Amid online backlash faced by the men's Olympic hockey team regarding the inclusion of FBI director Kash Patel during their gold medal celebrations and members of the team laughing at President Trump's comments of being impeached if he did not invite the women's team to the White House, the team was invited to meet with the president and attend the State of the Union. LaCombe did not attend either the State of the Union or tour the White House.

== Career statistics ==
=== Regular season and playoffs ===
			Regular season					Playoffs
Season	Team	League	GP	G	A	Pts	PIM	GP	G	A	Pts	PIM
2017–18	Shattuck St. Mary's	HSMN	55	5	44	49	30	—	—	—	—	—
2018–19	Shattuck St. Mary's	HSMN	54	22	67	89	54	—	—	—	—	—
2018–19	Chicago Steel	USHL	3	0	0	0	0	2	0	0	0	0
2019–20	University of Minnesota	B1G	37	3	10	13	14	—	—	—	—	—
2020–21	University of Minnesota	B1G	27	4	17	21	8	—	—	—	—	—
2021–22	University of Minnesota	B1G	39	3	27	30	12	—	—	—	—	—
2022–23	University of Minnesota	B1G	37	9	26	35	13	—	—	—	—	—
2022–23	Anaheim Ducks	NHL	2	0	0	0	0	—	—	—	—	—
2023–24	Anaheim Ducks	NHL	71	2	15	17	24	—	—	—	—	—
2024–25	Anaheim Ducks	NHL	75	14	29	43	28	—	—	—	—	—
2025–26	Anaheim Ducks	NHL	82	10	48	58	19	12	1	9	10	4
NHL totals			230	26	92	118	71	12	1	9	10	4

=== International ===
Year	Team	Event	GP	G	A	Pts	PIM
2021	United States	WJC	6	0	1	1	0
2025	United States	WC	10	2	3	5	2
Junior totals			6	0	1	1	0
Senior totals			10	2	3	5	2

== Awards and honors ==
Award	Year	Ref
College
All-Big Ten Freshman Team	2020	
All-Big Ten First Team	2021	
AHCA West Second Team All-American	2021	
All-Big Ten Second Team	2022, 2023	
Big Ten All-Tournament Team	2022	
