= Matty Beniers =

American ice hockey player (born 2002)

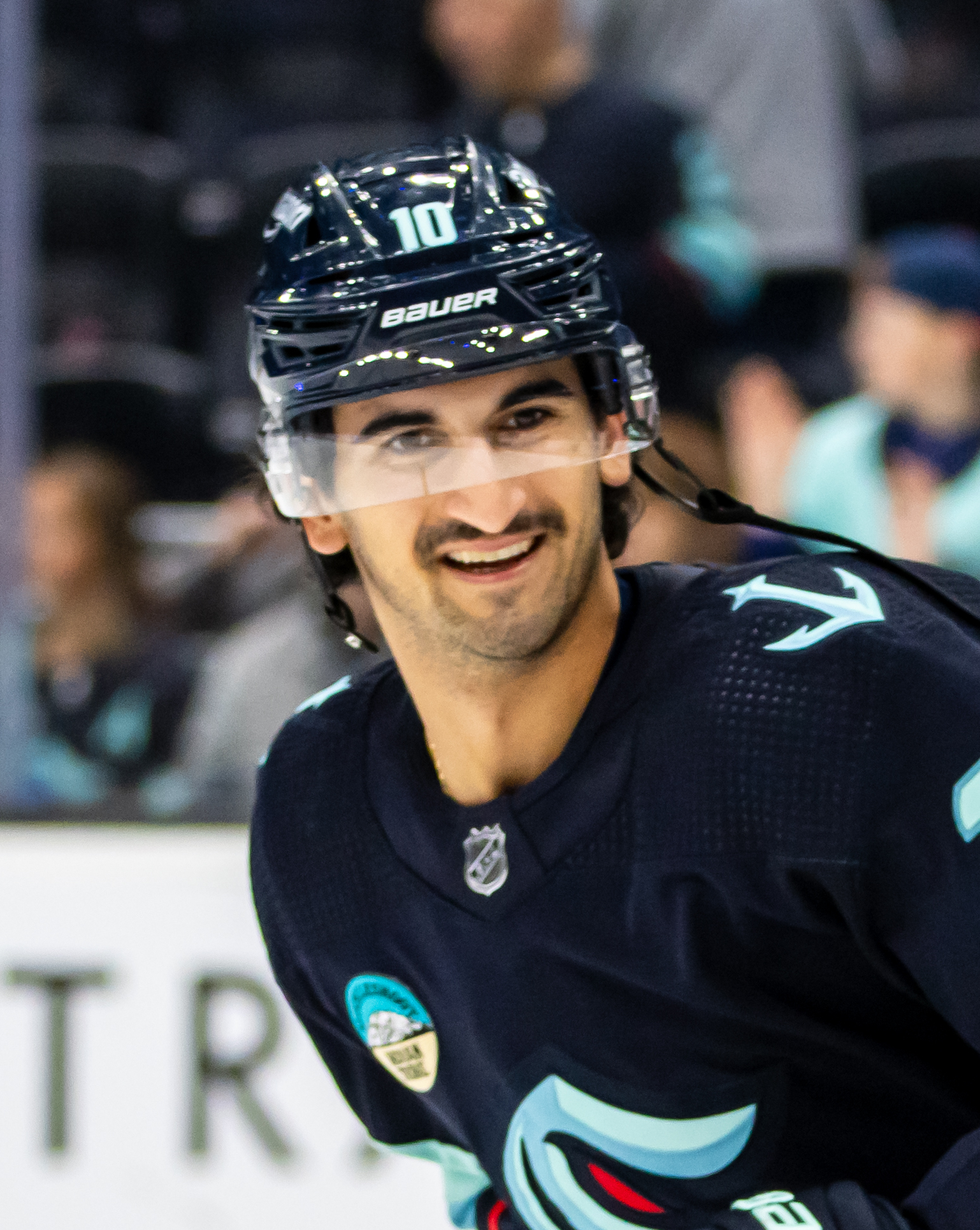
- Beniers with the Seattle Kraken in 2023
- Born: November 5, 2002 (age 24) Hingham, Massachusetts, U.S.
- Height: 6 ft 2 in (188 cm)
- Weight: 181 lb (82 kg; 12 st 13 lb)
- Position: Center
- Shoots: Left
- NHL team: Seattle Kraken
- National team: United States
- NHL draft: 2nd overall, 2021; Seattle Kraken
- Playing career: 2022–present

Matthew Beniers (/bəˈnɪərs/; born November 5, 2002) is an American professional ice hockey player who is a center and alternate captain for the Seattle Kraken of the National Hockey League (NHL). The Kraken drafted Beniers second overall in the 2021 NHL entry draft with their first-ever selection in an entry draft. He played college ice hockey at Michigan. He won the Calder Memorial Trophy as rookie of the year in 2023.

== Early life ==
Beniers was born on November 5, 2002, in Hingham, Massachusetts, to parents Bob Beniers and Christine Maglione. His father played collegiate football at Cornell University while his mother was an understudy for A Chorus Line on Broadway before enrolling in law school.

== Playing career ==
=== Junior ===
During the 2018–19 season, in his first season with the USA Hockey National Team Development Program of the United States Hockey League (USHL), Beniers recorded 10 goals and 13 assists in 42 games. During the 2019–20 season, Beniers was alternate captain of the team, where he ranked second on the team in scoring with 18 goals and 23 assists in 44 games.

=== Collegiate ===
Beniers was committed to play ice hockey for Harvard; however, after the Ivy League cancelled their season due to the COVID-19 pandemic, he enrolled at Michigan in August 2020. Beniers began his collegiate career for the Michigan Wolverines during the 2020–21 season. He recorded 10 goals and 14 assists in 24 games during his freshman season. He led the conference in on-ice rating with a +21, ranking him eighth nationally. He led first-time NHL Draft-eligible NCAA players in goals, goals per game (0.42), and shots on goal per game. His 24 points ranked third in the league in freshmen scoring and fourth nationally. He recorded his first career goal in his first game of the season.

On February 26, 2021, he recorded his first career hat-trick in a game against Arizona State. He was subsequently named the Big Ten Third Star of the Week for the week ending March 1. On March 5, he recorded his first career four-point game, with one goal and three assists in a game against Minnesota. He was subsequently named the Big Ten Third Star of the Week for the week ending March 9. Following the season, he was named to the All-Big Ten Freshman Team and the College Hockey News All-Rookie Team.

On August 20, 2021, the Wolverines announced that Beniers would return for the 2021–22 season. During his sophomore year, he was the Big Ten Scoring Champion, as he recorded 27 points in 20 conference games. He had 10 multiple-point conference games. He led Michigan in scoring with 20 goals and 23 assists for 43 points in 37 games. Following an outstanding season, he was named a unanimous selection to the All-Big Ten First Team, and a finalist for the Big Ten Player of the Year. He was also named a finalist for the Hobey Baker Award and an AHCA West First Team All-American.

=== Professional ===
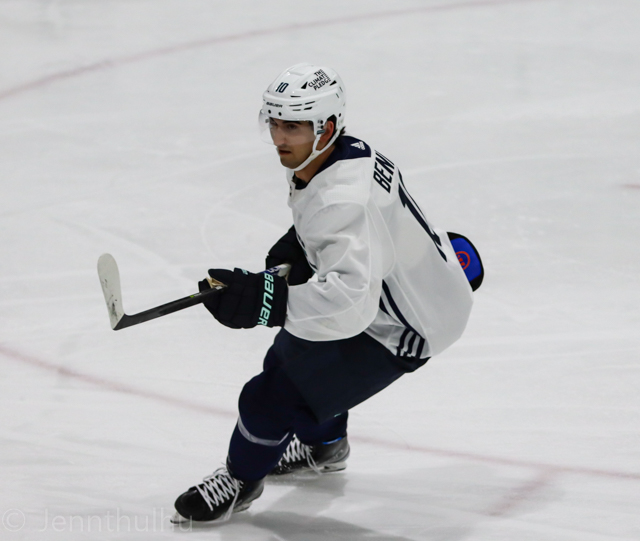
Beniers with the Seattle Kraken in April 2022.

Beniers entered the 2021 NHL entry draft as one of the consensus top prospects, and was ultimately selected second overall by the Seattle Kraken, becoming the expansion team's first-ever draft selection. On April 10, 2022, Beniers signed a three-year, entry-level contract with the Kraken. He had been uncertain whether he would turn professional or return to the University of Michigan for another year, but ultimately opted to sign, following discussions with his family, Kraken general manager Ron Francis, and new teammate Ryan Donato. Making his NHL debut on April 12, two days after his contract signing, Beniers recorded his first NHL assist in a 5–3 loss to the Calgary Flames. He described being "excited about how all right I felt" during his first appearance in the league. Beniers scored his first NHL goal in an April 16 win at home against the New Jersey Devils. He ended the season with three goals and nine points through 10 NHL games.

Beginning his first full season in the NHL, Beniers was named as the Kraken's representative in the 2023 NHL All-Star Game. On January 30, 2023, it was announced Beniers would miss the All-Star Game due to an injury caused by a hit from Vancouver Canucks defenceman Tyler Myers. He appeared in 80 regular season games, leading all rookies in points (57) and tying for the lead in goals (24) with Dallas Stars forward Wyatt Johnston. On June 26, he was announced as the winner of the Calder Memorial Trophy, the NHL's Rookie of the Year award.

On August 20, 2024, the Kraken and Beniers agreed to a 7-year, $50 million contract extension, with Seattle citing Beniers as a cornerstone of the franchise.

== International play ==
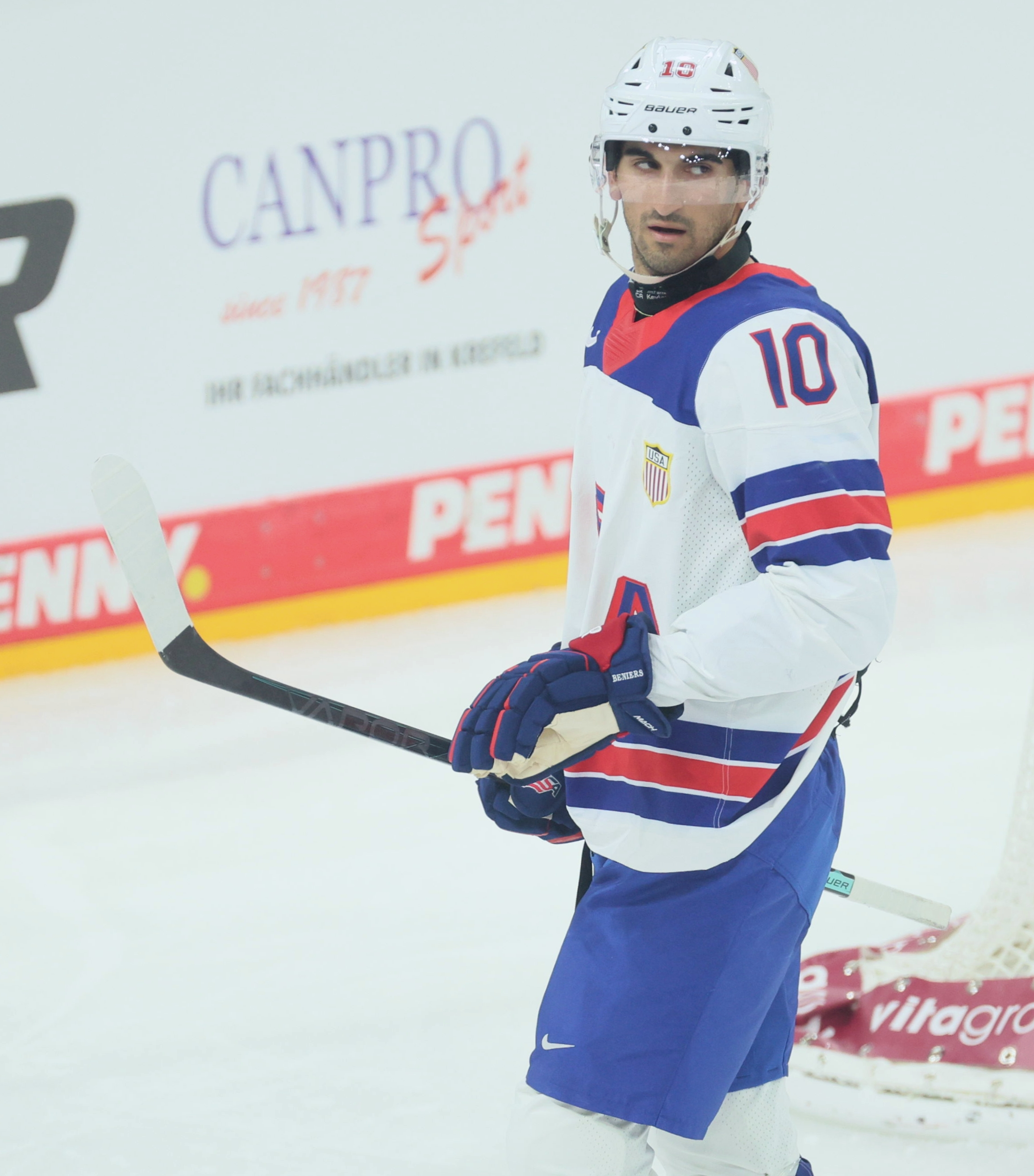
- Beniers with Team USA at the 2025 IIHF World Championship

Medal record

Representing United States

Ice hockey

World Championships
Gold medal – first place	2025 Sweden/Denmark	
Bronze medal – third place	2021 Latvia	

World Junior Championships
Gold medal – first place	2021 Canada	

World U18 Championships
Bronze medal – third place	2019 Sweden	

Beniers represented the United States at the 2019 IIHF World U18 Championships, where he recorded two goals in seven games and won a bronze medal. Beniers represented the United States at the 2021 World Junior Ice Hockey Championships, where he was the youngest player on the roster, scoring one goal and two assists and averaging 17:05 of ice time in seven games as a second-line center, helping the United States win gold.

Beniers represented the United States at the 2021 IIHF World Championship, where he was the only draft-eligible player on Team USA and won a bronze medal. He became the fifth Wolverine to represent their country at both the World Junior and World Championship in the same season, following Jack Johnson (2007), Jacob Trouba (2013), Dylan Larkin (2015) and Quinn Hughes (2018 and 2019).

Beniers represented the United States at the 2022 Winter Olympics with one goal and one assist in four games and finished in fifth place.

Beniers represented the United States at the 2025 IIHF World Championship, where he recorded three goals and three assists in ten games and helped Team USA win their first gold medal since 1933.

== Career statistics ==
=== Regular season and playoffs ===
			Regular season					Playoffs
Season	Team	League	GP	G	A	Pts	PIM	GP	G	A	Pts	PIM
2018–19	U.S. National Development Team	USHL	42	10	13	23	16	—	—	—	—	—
2019–20	U.S. National Development Team	USHL	44	18	23	41	24	—	—	—	—	—
2020–21	University of Michigan	B1G	24	10	14	24	0	—	—	—	—	—
2021–22	University of Michigan	B1G	37	20	23	43	16	—	—	—	—	—
2021–22	Seattle Kraken	NHL	10	3	6	9	0	—	—	—	—	—
2022–23	Seattle Kraken	NHL	80	24	33	57	2	14	3	4	7	4
2023–24	Seattle Kraken	NHL	77	15	22	37	20	—	—	—	—	—
2024–25	Seattle Kraken	NHL	82	20	23	43	14	—	—	—	—	—
2025–26	Seattle Kraken	NHL	82	20	30	50	23	—	—	—	—	—
NHL totals			331	82	114	196	59	14	3	4	7	4

=== International ===
Year	Team	Event	Result	GP	G	A	Pts	PIM
2019	United States	U18	3rd place, bronze medalist(s)	7	2	0	2	4
2021	United States	WJC	1st place, gold medalist(s)	7	1	2	3	2
2021	United States	WC	3rd place, bronze medalist(s)	6	1	1	2	2
2022	United States	OG	5th	4	1	1	2	4
2025	United States	WC	1st place, gold medalist(s)	10	3	3	6	4
Junior totals				14	3	2	5	6
Senior totals				20	5	5	10	10

== Awards and honors ==
Award	Year	Ref
College
All-Big Ten Freshman Team	2021	
College Hockey News All-Rookie Team	2021	
All-Big Ten First Team	2022	
Big Ten Scoring Champion	2022	
Big Ten All-Tournament Team	2022	
AHCA West First Team All-American	2022	
NHL
NHL All-Star Game	2023	
Calder Memorial Trophy	2023	
NHL All-Rookie Team	2023	

Awards and achievements
Preceded by None	Seattle Kraken first-round draft pick 2021	Succeeded by Shane Wright
Preceded by Cole Caufield	Big Ten Scoring Champion; 2021–22	Succeeded by Logan Cooley, Jimmy Snuggerud
Preceded by Moritz Seider	Winner of the Calder Memorial Trophy; 2023	Succeeded by Connor Bedard
