= Matthew Knies =

American ice hockey player (born 2002)

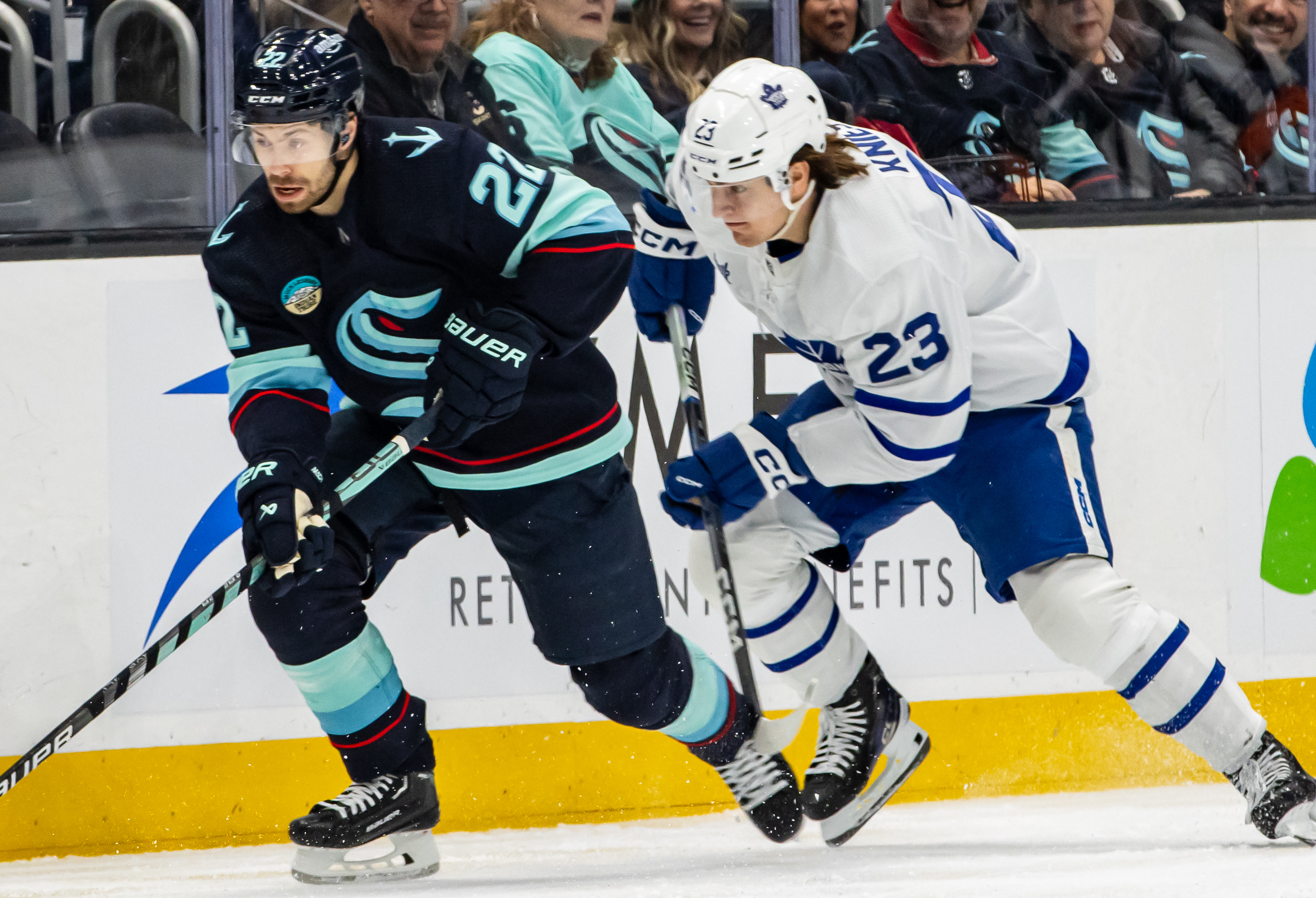
- Knies (right) chasing down Oliver Bjorkstrand of the Seattle Kraken in 2024
- Born: October 17, 2002 (age 23) Phoenix, Arizona, U.S.
- Height: 6 ft 3 in (191 cm)
- Weight: 227 lb (103 kg; 16 st 3 lb)
- Position: Forward
- Shoots: Left
- NHL team Former teams: Columbus Blue Jackets; Toronto Maple Leafs
- National team: United States
- NHL draft: 57th overall, 2021; Toronto Maple Leafs
- Playing career: 2023–present

Matthew Michael Knies (/naɪz/ NYZE; born October 17, 2002) is an American professional ice hockey player who is a forward for the Columbus Blue Jackets of the National Hockey League (NHL). Knies was drafted 57th overall by the Toronto Maple Leafs in the 2021 NHL entry draft.

== Playing career ==
=== Junior ===
Knies played two full seasons for the Tri-City Storm of the United States Hockey League (USHL), where he recorded 31 goals and 56 assists in 90 games. Knies was drafted in the second round, 57th overall, by the Toronto Maple Leafs in the 2021 NHL entry draft.

=== College ===
Beginning his collegiate career, Knies first played for the Minnesota Golden Gophers during the 2021–22 season. During his freshman season, he ranked tied for third on the team, and first among freshman, with 10 goals and 17 assists for 27 points in 29 games. Following an outstanding season, he was a unanimous pick for the Big Ten All-Freshman Team, and was named a finalist for Big Ten Freshman of the Year.

The 2022–23 season saw further success for Knies, notably playing on a top line with fellow NHL prospects Logan Cooley and Jimmy Snuggerud that was considered one of the best in college ice hockey. He scored 21 goals and 21 assists in 40 games. He won the Big Ten Player of the Year award, and was named a finalist for the Hobey Baker Award as the top player in American college ice hockey, with Cooley also one of the three. The Golden Gophers reached the national championship game at the 2023 NCAA Division I men's ice hockey tournament, but ultimately were defeated by the Quinnipiac Bobcats in overtime. Following the tournament, he decided to conclude his collegiate career, finishing with 36 goals and 39 assists in 73 career games.

=== Professional ===
On April 9, 2023, Knies signed a three-year, entry-level contract with the Maple Leafs. Upon his arrival in Toronto, he was hosted by team captain John Tavares at his house. Knies made his NHL debut on April 10, in a road game against the Florida Panthers. After playing in the final three games of the regular season, Knies continued with the team into the 2023 Stanley Cup playoffs. He notably had a primary assist on Tavares' series-clinching goal in Game 6 that saw the Maple Leafs win their first playoff series since 2004. The Maple Leafs faced the Panthers in the second round, and Knies scored his first career NHL goal against Sergei Bobrovsky in the opening game of the series on May 2. He exited Game 2 after being concussed by Panthers forward Sam Bennett, and it was subsequently announced that he would miss at least the next two games. On December 16, 2023, Knies achieved a Gordie Howe hat trick in a 7–0 victory over the Pittsburgh Penguins. He opened the scoring and fought John Ludvig within the game's first five minutes and assisted on Max Domi's goal in the second period.

On January 4, 2025, Knies recorded his first career hat-trick in a game against the Boston Bruins.

On September 28, 2026, Knies was traded by the Maple Leafs to the Columbus Blue Jackets, alongside Steven Lorentz, Emil Andrae, and a conditional 2027 second-round draft pick, in exchange for Kirill Marchenko, Elvis Merzļikins, and Miles Wood.

== International play ==
Knies represented the United States junior team at the 2022 World Junior Championships, where he appeared in one game before the tournament was canceled due to the COVID-19 pandemic.

On January 13, 2022, Knies was named to the United States senior team's roster to compete at the 2022 Winter Olympics.

== Personal life ==
Knies was born to Miroslav and Michaela Knies, who immigrated to the United States from Slovakia before his birth. He has an older brother, Phillip, who played ice hockey for Miami University and Bentley University. Knies is fluent in Slovak, which he uses to speak to his grandparents. Growing up in Arizona, he was a fan of the Arizona Coyotes.

== Career statistics ==
=== Regular season and playoffs ===
			Regular season					Playoffs
Season	Team	League	GP	G	A	Pts	PIM	GP	G	A	Pts	PIM
2018–19	Tri-City Storm	USHL	2	0	0	0	0	—	—	—	—	—
2019–20	Tri-City Storm	USHL	44	14	31	45	12	—	—	—	—	—
2020–21	Tri-City Storm	USHL	44	17	25	42	24	3	1	3	4	0
2021–22	University of Minnesota	B1G	33	15	18	33	31	—	—	—	—	—
2022–23	University of Minnesota	B1G	40	21	21	42	29	—	—	—	—	—
2022–23	Toronto Maple Leafs	NHL	3	0	1	1	2	7	1	3	4	4
2023–24	Toronto Maple Leafs	NHL	80	15	20	35	45	7	2	1	3	2
2024–25	Toronto Maple Leafs	NHL	78	29	29	58	43	13	5	2	7	6
2025–26	Toronto Maple Leafs	NHL	79	23	43	66	29	—	—	—	—	—
NHL totals			240	67	93	160	119	27	8	6	14	12

=== International ===
Year	Team	Event	Result	GP	G	A	Pts	PIM
2022	United States	OG	5th	4	1	1	2	2
2022	United States	WJC	5th	5	0	3	3	0
Junior totals				5	0	3	3	0
Senior totals				4	1	1	2	2

== Awards and honors ==
Award	Year	Ref
College
All-Big Ten Freshman Team	2022	
All-Big Ten Second Team	2022	
Big Ten Player of the Year	2023	
All-Big Ten First Team	2023	
AHCA West First Team All-American	2023	

Awards and achievements
Preceded by Ben Meyers	Big Ten Player of the Year; 2022–23	Succeeded by Gavin Brindley
