= 2021 World Junior Ice Hockey Championships rosters =

Below are the rosters for teams competing in the 2021 World Junior Ice Hockey Championships. Player NHL rights are accurate as of the tournament.

== Group A ==
=== Canada ===
- Head coach: (Canada) André Tourigny

Pos.	No.	Player	Team	League	NHL Rights
G	1	Devon Levi	(United States) Northeastern University	(United States) NCAA	Florida Panthers
G	30	Taylor Gauthier	(Canada) Prince George Cougars	(Canada) WHL	
G	31	Dylan Garand	(Canada) Kamloops Blazers	(Canada) WHL	New York Rangers
D	2	Braden Schneider	(Canada) Brandon Wheat Kings	(Canada) WHL	New York Rangers
D	3	Kaedan Korczak	(Canada) Kelowna Rockets	(Canada) WHL	Vegas Golden Knights
D	4	Bowen Byram [C]	(Canada) Vancouver Giants	(Canada) WHL	Colorado Avalanche
D	5	Thomas Harley	(Canada) Mississauga Steelheads	(Canada) OHL	Dallas Stars
D	6	Jamie Drysdale	(United States) Erie Otters	(Canada) OHL	Anaheim Ducks
D	8	Jordan Spence	(Canada) Moncton Wildcats	(Canada) QMJHL	Los Angeles Kings
D	21	Kaiden Guhle	(Canada) Prince Albert Raiders	(Canada) WHL	Montreal Canadiens
D	27	Justin Barron	(Canada) Halifax Mooseheads	(Canada) QMJHL	Colorado Avalanche
F	7	Kirby Dach [C] (injured)	(United States) Chicago Blackhawks	NHL	Chicago Blackhawks
F	9	Connor Zary	(Canada) Kamloops Blazers	(Canada) WHL	Calgary Flames
F	10	Dylan Holloway	(United States) University of Wisconsin	(United States) NCAA	Edmonton Oilers
F	11	Cole Perfetti	(United States) Saginaw Spirit	(Canada) OHL	Winnipeg Jets
F	12	Jakob Pelletier	(Canada) Val-d'Or Foreurs	(Canada) QMJHL	Calgary Flames
F	15	Alex Newhook	(United States) Boston College	(United States) NCAA	Colorado Avalanche
F	16	Ryan Suzuki	(United States) Saginaw Spirit	(Canada) OHL	Carolina Hurricanes
F	17	Connor McMichael [A]	(Canada) London Knights	(Canada) OHL	Washington Capitals
F	18	Peyton Krebs	(Canada) Winnipeg Ice	(Canada) WHL	Vegas Golden Knights
F	19	Quinton Byfield	(Canada) Sudbury Wolves	(Canada) OHL	Los Angeles Kings
F	20	Dawson Mercer	(Canada) Chicoutimi Saguenéens	(Canada) QMJHL	New Jersey Devils
F	22	Dylan Cozens [C]	(Canada) Lethbridge Hurricanes	(Canada) WHL	Buffalo Sabres
F	26	Philip Tomasino	(Canada) Oshawa Generals	(Canada) OHL	Nashville Predators
F	29	Jack Quinn	(Canada) Ottawa 67's	(Canada) OHL	Buffalo Sabres

Source: IIHF.com

=== Finland ===
- Head coach: (Finland) Antti Pennanen

Pos.	No.	Player	Team	League	NHL Rights
G	1	Kari Piiroinen	(Finland) TUTO Hockey	(Finland) Mestis	
G	30	Joel Blomqvist	(Finland) Kärpät	(Finland) Liiga	Pittsburgh Penguins
G	31	Roope Taponen	(Finland) Kiekko-Espoo	(Finland) Mestis	
D	2	Santeri Hatakka [A]	(Finland) Ilves	(Finland) Liiga	San Jose Sharks
D	3	Ruben Rafkin	(Finland) TPS	(Finland) Liiga	
D	4	Ville Heinola	(Finland) Lukko	(Finland) Liiga	Winnipeg Jets
D	6	Eemil Viro	(Finland) TPS	(Finland) Liiga	Detroit Red Wings
D	7	Topi Niemelä	(Finland) Kärpät	(Finland) Liiga	Toronto Maple Leafs
D	10	Kasper Puutio	(Finland) Kärpät	(Finland) Liiga	Florida Panthers
D	12	Matias Rajaniemi	(Finland) Pelicans	(Finland) Liiga	New York Islanders
D	35	Mikko Kokkonen [A]	(Finland) Jukurit	(Finland) Liiga	Toronto Maple Leafs
F	13	Roby Järventie	(Finland) Ilves	(Finland) Liiga	Ottawa Senators
F	15	Anton Lundell [C]	(Finland) HIFK	(Finland) Liiga	Florida Panthers
F	19	Petteri Puhakka	(Finland) TUTO Hockey	(Finland) Mestis	
F	20	Samuel Helenius	(Finland) JYP	(Finland) Liiga	
F	21	Mikael Pyyhtiä	(Finland) TPS	(Finland) Liiga	Columbus Blue Jackets
F	22	Roni Hirvonen	(Finland) Ässät	(Finland) Liiga	Toronto Maple Leafs
F	23	Mikko Petman	(Finland) Lukko	(Finland) Liiga	
F	27	Juuso Pärssinen	(Finland) TPS	(Finland) Liiga	Nashville Predators
F	28	Henri Nikkanen	(Finland) Jukurit	(Finland) Liiga	Winnipeg Jets
F	29	Kasper Simontaival	(Finland) Tappara	(Finland) Liiga	Los Angeles Kings
F	32	Matias Mäntykivi	(Finland) SaiPa	(Finland) Liiga	Boston Bruins
F	33	Brad Lambert	(Finland) JYP	(Finland) Liiga	
F	34	Aku Räty	(Finland) Kärpät	(Finland) Liiga	Arizona Coyotes
F	36	Benjamin Korhonen	(Finland) KalPa	(Finland) Liiga	

Source: IIHF.com

=== Germany ===
- Head coach: (Germany) Tobias Abstreiter

Pos.	No.	Player	Team	League	NHL Rights
G	1	Arno Tiefensee	(Germany) Adler Mannheim	(Germany) DEL	
G	29	Florian Bugl	(Austria) RB Hockey Juniors	AlpsHL	
G	30	Jonas Gähr	(Germany) Löwen Frankfurt	(Germany) DEL2	
D	3	Simon Gnyp [A]	(Germany) Kölner Haie	(Germany) DEL	
D	4	Maksymilian Szuber	(Austria) RB Hockey Juniors	AlpsHL	
D	5	Lucas Flade	(Germany) ESC Dresden II	(Germany) DEL2	
D	6	Niklas Länger	(Germany) Augsburger Panther	(Germany) DEL	
D	17	Steven Raabe	(Germany) Grizzlys Wolfsburg	(Germany) DEL	
D	22	Maximilian Glötzl	(Germany) Kölner Haie	(Germany) DEL	
D	25	Mario Zimmermann	(Germany) EV Landshut	(Germany) DEL2	
D	27	Luca Münzenberger	(Germany) Kölner Junghaie U20	(Germany) DNL	
F	7	Florian Elias	(Germany) Adler Mannheim	(Germany) DEL	
F	8	Tim Stützle [C]	(Germany) Adler Mannheim	(Germany) DEL	Ottawa Senators
F	9	Joshua Samanski	(Germany) Ravensburg Towerstars	(Germany) DEL2	
F	10	Filip Reisnecker	(Germany) Fischtown Pinguins	(Germany) DEL	
F	11	Jan Nijenhuis	(Germany) Grizzlys Wolfsburg	(Germany) DEL	
F	13	Markus Schweiger	(Germany) ESV Kaufbeuren	(Germany) DEL2	
F	14	Julian Chrobot	(Germany) Kölner Haie	(Germany) DEL	
F	15	Justin Volek	(Germany) Ravensburg Towerstars	(Germany) DEL2	
F	18	Jan-Luca Schumacher	(Germany) Heilbronner Falken	(Germany) DEL2	
F	19	Samuel Dubé	(Austria) RB Hockey Juniors	AlpsHL	
F	20	Jakub Borzecki	(Austria) RB Hockey Juniors	AlpsHL	
F	24	John-Jason Peterka [A]	(Germany) EHC München	(Germany) DEL	Buffalo Sabres
F	26	Enrico Henriquez-Morales	(Germany) Starbulls Rosenheim	(Germany) Oberliga	
F	28	Manuel Alberg	(Austria) RB Hockey Juniors	AlpsHL	

Source: IIHF.com

=== Slovakia ===
- Head coach: (Slovakia) Róbert Petrovický

Pos.	No.	Player	Team	League	NHL Rights
G	1	Eugen Rabčan	(Slovakia) HC '05 Banská Bystrica	(Slovakia) Slovak Extraliga	
G	29	Samuel Hlavaj	(Canada) Sherbrooke Phoenix	(Canada) QMJHL	
G	30	Simon Latkoczy	(Slovakia) HK Dukla Trenčín	(Slovakia) Slovak Extraliga	
D	3	Šimon Bečár	(Slovakia) HK Dukla Trenčín	(Slovakia) Slovak Extraliga	
D	4	Dávid Mudrák [A]	(Slovakia) HC Košice	(Slovakia) Slovak Extraliga	
D	5	Šimon Nemec	(Slovakia) HK Nitra	(Slovakia) Slovak Extraliga	
D	12	Rayen Petrovický	(Finland) TUTO Hockey Turku	(Finland) Mestis	
D	16	Marko Stacha	(Slovakia) HK Dukla Trenčín	(Slovakia) Slovak Extraliga	
D	20	Samuel Kňažko [C]	(Finland) TPS	(Finland) Liiga	Columbus Blue Jackets
D	23	Oliver Turan	(Slovakia) HC 07 Detva	(Slovakia) Slovak Extraliga	
D	24	Andrej Golian	(Slovakia) HC 07 Detva	(Slovakia) Slovak Extraliga	
F	7	Dominik Sojka	(Slovakia) HC '05 Banská Bystrica	(Slovakia) Slovak Extraliga	
F	8	Martin Chromiak	(Canada) Kingston Frontenacs	(Canada) OHL	Los Angeles Kings
F	9	Roman Faith	(Slovakia) Bratislava Capitals	(Austria) ICEHL	
F	10	Oleksij Myklucha	(Canada) Rouyn-Noranda Huskies	(Canada) QMJHL	
F	11	Matej Kašlík	(Canada) Chicoutimi Saguenéens	(Canada) QMJHL	
F	13	Jakub Kolenič	(Slovakia) HKM Zvolen	(Slovakia) Slovak Extraliga	
F	14	Dominik Jendek	(Slovakia) HC Slovan Bratislava	(Slovakia) Slovak Extraliga	
F	15	Filip Mešár	(Slovakia) HK Poprad	(Slovakia) Slovak Extraliga	
F	17	Artur Turanský	(United States) Wilkes-Barre/Scranton Knights	(United States) NAHL	
F	18	Juraj Slafkovský	(Finland) TPS	(Finland) Liiga	
F	19	Simon Jellúš	(Sweden) Karlskrona HK	(Sweden) Hockeyettan	
F	22	Maroš Jedlička	(Slovakia) HKM Zvolen	(Slovakia) Slovak Extraliga	
F	25	Michal Mrázik [A]	(Sweden) Linköping HC	(Sweden) SHL	
F	27	Juraj Eliaš	(Slovakia) HC Košice	(Slovakia) Slovak Extraliga	

Source: IIHF.com

=== Switzerland ===
- Head coach: (Switzerland) Marco Bayer

Pos.	No.	Player	Team	League	NHL Rights
G	1	Noah Patenaude	(Canada) Saint John Sea Dogs	(Canada) QMJHL	
G	29	Thibault Fatton	(Switzerland) Lugano U20	(Switzerland) U20-Elit	
G	30	Andri Henauer	(Switzerland) Bern U20	(Switzerland) U20-Elit	
D	2	Bastian Guggenheim	(Switzerland) SCL Tigers	(Switzerland) NL	
D	4	Noah Delémont	(Switzerland) EHC Biel	(Switzerland) NL	
D	5	Giancarlo Chanton	(Switzerland) SC Langenthal	(Switzerland) SL	
D	17	Alessandro Villa	(Switzerland) Lugano U20	(Switzerland) U20-Elit	
D	18	Iñaki Baragano [A]	(Switzerland) Lausanne U20	(Switzerland) U20-Elit	
D	21	Nathan Vouardoux	(Switzerland) Lausanne U20	(Switzerland) U20-Elit	
D	23	Cédric Fiedler	(United States) Western Michigan University	(United States) NCAA	
D	24	Noah Meier	(Switzerland) GCK Lions	(Switzerland) SL	
D	26	Rocco Pezzullo	(Switzerland) HC Ambrì-Piotta	(Switzerland) NL	
F	8	Simon Knak [C]	(Switzerland) HC Davos	(Switzerland) NL	
F	9	Attilio Biasca	(Switzerland) Zug U20	(Switzerland) U20-Elit	
F	10	Elvis Schläpfer	(Switzerland) EHC Biel	(Switzerland) NL	
F	11	Lionel Marchand	(Sweden) Timrå IK J20	(Sweden) J20 Nationell	
F	12	Dario Allenspach	(Switzerland) EV Zug	(Switzerland) NL	
F	13	Valentin Hofer	(Switzerland) Zug U20	(Switzerland) U20-Elit	
F	14	Lorenzo Canonica	(Switzerland) Lugano U20	(Switzerland) U20-Elit	
F	15	Ronny Dähler	(Switzerland) SC Langenthal	(Switzerland) SL	
F	19	Keanu Derungs	(Switzerland) EVZ Academy	(Switzerland) SL	
F	20	Stefano Bottini	(Canada) Penticton Vees	(Canada) BCHL	
F	22	Joel Salzgeber [A]	(Switzerland) SCL Tigers	(Switzerland) NL	
F	27	Gaétan Jobin	(Switzerland) HC Fribourg-Gottéron	(Switzerland) NL	
F	28	Ray Fust	(Canada) Chilliwack Chiefs	(Canada) BCHL	

Source: IIHF.com

== Group B ==
=== Austria ===
- Head coach: (Switzerland) Roger Bader

Pos.	No.	Player	Team	League	NHL Rights
G	1	Sebastian Wraneschitz	(Austria) Vienna Capitals	(Austria) ICEHL	
G	29	Leon Sommer	(Austria) Steel Wings Linz	AlpsHL	
G	30	Jakob Brandner	(Finland) Kotkan Titaanit	(Finland) Suomi-sarja	
D	2	Bernhard Posch	(Austria) EHC Bregenzerwald	AlpsHL	
D	4	Philipp Wimmer	(Austria) RB Hockey Juniors	AlpsHL	
D	5	Jacob Pfeffer	(Austria) Graz99ers	(Austria) ICEHL	
D	12	Timo Pallierer	(Austria) Vienna Capitals	(Austria) ICEHL	
D	14	Jonas Kutzer	(Austria) Dornbirner EC	(Austria) ICEHL	
D	15	Luis Lindner [A]	(United States) Boston Junior Bruins	(United States) USPHL	
D	25	Lukas Necesany	(Austria) RB Hockey Juniors	AlpsHL	
F	3	Maximilian Theirich	(Austria) Klagenfurter AC II	AlpsHL	
F	6	Clemens Krainz	(Austria) Graz99ers	(Austria) ICEHL	
F	7	Marlon Tschofen	(Switzerland) Kloten U20	(Switzerland) U20-Elit	
F	9	Mathias Bohm	(Austria) Vienna Capitals	(Austria) ICEHL	
F	13	Leon Wallner	(Sweden) Södertälje SK J20	(Sweden) J20 Nationell	
F	16	Dominik Unterweger	(Austria) VEU Feldkirch	AlpsHL	
F	19	Marco Kasper	(Sweden) Rögle BK	(Sweden) SHL	
F	20	Fabian Hochegger	(Austria) Klagenfurter AC II	AlpsHL	
F	21	Tim Harnisch [A]	(Austria) RB Hockey Juniors	AlpsHL	
F	22	Senna Peeters	(Sweden) Rögle BK J20	(Sweden) J20 Nationell	
F	23	Marco Rossi [C]	(Switzerland) ZSC Lions	(Switzerland) NL	Minnesota Wild
F	24	Lucas Thaler	(Sweden) Mora IK J20	(Sweden) J20 Nationell	
F	26	Finn van Ee	(Austria) Klagenfurter AC II	AlpsHL	
F	27	Julian Pauschenwein	(Austria) Graz99ers	(Austria) ICEHL	

Source: IIHF.com

=== Czech Republic ===
- Head coach: (Czech Republic) Karel Mlejnek

Pos.	No.	Player	Team	League	NHL Rights
G	1	Lukáš Pařík	(Czech Republic) HC Benátky nad Jizerou	(Czech Republic) 1.liga	Los Angeles Kings
G	2	Jan Bednář	(Czech Republic) HC Karlovy Vary	(Czech Republic) Czech Extraliga	Detroit Red Wings
G	30	Nick Malík	(Czech Republic) HC Frýdek-Místek	(Czech Republic) 1.liga	
D	3	Karel Klikorka	(Czech Republic) BK Mladá Boleslav	(Czech Republic) Czech Extraliga	
D	4	Radek Kučeřík [A]	(Czech Republic) HC ZUBR Přerov	(Czech Republic) 1.liga	
D	5	Stanislav Svozil	(Czech Republic) HC Kometa Brno	(Czech Republic) Czech Extraliga	
D	7	Martin Haš	(Czech Republic) HC Benátky nad Jizerou	(Czech Republic) 1.liga	Washington Capitals
D	8	David Jiříček	(Czech Republic) HC Plzeň	(Czech Republic) Czech Extraliga	
D	22	Jiří Suhrada	(Czech Republic) PSG Berani Zlín	(Czech Republic) Czech Extraliga	
D	23	Šimon Kubíček	(Czech Republic) HC Stadion Litoměřice	(Czech Republic) 1.liga	
D	28	Michael Krutil	(Czech Republic) HC Stadion Litoměřice	(Czech Republic) 1.liga	Chicago Blackhawks
F	10	Martin Lang	(Czech Republic) HC Stadion Litoměřice	(Czech Republic) 1.liga	
F	11	Michal Teplý	(Czech Republic) HC Stadion Litoměřice	(Czech Republic) 1.liga	Chicago Blackhawks
F	13	Pavel Novák	(Czech Republic) HC Stadion Litoměřice	(Czech Republic) 1.liga	Minnesota Wild
F	15	Filip Přikryl	(Czech Republic) HC Plzeň	(Czech Republic) Czech Extraliga	
F	16	Adam Najman [A]	(Czech Republic) HC Bílí Tygři Liberec	(Czech Republic) Czech Extraliga	
F	17	Michal Gut	(Czech Republic) HC Baník Sokolov	(Czech Republic) 1.liga	
F	18	David Vitouch	(Czech Republic) HC Sparta Praha	(Czech Republic) Czech Extraliga	
F	19	Jan Myšák [C]	(Czech Republic) HC Litvínov	(Czech Republic) Czech Extraliga	Montreal Canadiens
F	21	Jaromír Pytlík	(Czech Republic) HC Stadion Litoměřice	(Czech Republic) 1.liga	New Jersey Devils
F	24	Martin Beránek	(Czech Republic) Motor České Budějovice	(Czech Republic) Czech Extraliga	
F	25	Jakub Rychlovský	(Czech Republic) HC Bílí Tygři Liberec	(Czech Republic) Czech Extraliga	
F	26	Adam Raška	(Czech Republic) HC Frýdek-Místek	(Czech Republic) 1.liga	San Jose Sharks
F	27	Filip Koffer	(Czech Republic) HC Stadion Litoměřice	(Czech Republic) 1.liga	
F	29	Radek Mužík	(Sweden) Luleå HF	(Sweden) SHL	

Source: IIHF.com

=== Russia ===
- Head coach: (Russia) Igor Larionov

Pos.	No.	Player	Team	League	NHL Rights
G	1	Yaroslav Askarov	(Russia) SKA Saint Petersburg	(Russia) KHL	Nashville Predators
G	29	Artur Akhtyamov	(Russia) Bars Kazan	(Russia) VHL	Toronto Maple Leafs
G	30	Vsevolod Skotnikov	(Russia) Zvezda Moscow	(Russia) VHL	
D	2	Yan Kuznetsov	(United States) University of Connecticut	(United States) NCAA	Calgary Flames
D	3	Artemi Knyazev	(Russia) Bars Kazan	(Russia) VHL	San Jose Sharks
D	5	Daniil Chayka	(Russia) CSKA Moscow	(Russia) KHL	
D	6	Semyon Chistyakov [A]	(Russia) Avangard Omsk	(Russia) KHL	Nashville Predators
D	7	Roman Bychkov	(Russia) Buran Voronezh	(Russia) VHL	Boston Bruins
D	14	Yegor Shekhovtsov	(Russia) SKA-Neva	(Russia) VHL	
D	17	Shakir Mukhamadullin	(Russia) Salavat Yulaev Ufa	(Russia) KHL	New Jersey Devils
D	20	Kirill Kirsanov	(Russia) SKA Saint Petersburg	(Russia) KHL	
F	8	Arseni Gritsyuk	(Russia) Avangard Omsk	(Russia) KHL	New Jersey Devils
F	9	Mikhail Abramov	(Canada) Victoriaville Tigres	(Canada) QMJHL	Toronto Maple Leafs
F	10	Vladislav Firstov	(United States) University of Connecticut	(United States) NCAA	Minnesota Wild
F	11	Zakhar Bardakov	(Russia) HC Vityaz	(Russia) KHL	
F	13	Vasili Ponomaryov	(Canada) Shawinigan Cataractes	(Canada) QMJHL	Carolina Hurricanes
F	18	Yegor Spiridonov	(Russia) SKA-Neva	(Russia) VHL	San Jose Sharks
F	19	Vasily Podkolzin [C]	(Russia) SKA Saint Petersburg	(Russia) KHL	Vancouver Canucks
F	21	Egor Chinakhov	(Russia) Avangard Omsk	(Russia) KHL	Columbus Blue Jackets
F	22	Marat Khusnutdinov	(Russia) SKA-1946	(Russia) MHL	Minnesota Wild
F	23	Yegor Afanasyev	(Russia) CSKA Moscow	(Russia) KHL	Nashville Predators
F	24	Ilya Safonov	(Russia) Ak Bars Kazan	(Russia) KHL	
F	25	Danil Bashkirov	(Russia) Salavat Yulaev Ufa	(Russia) KHL	
F	27	Rodion Amirov [A]	(Russia) Salavat Yulaev Ufa	(Russia) KHL	Toronto Maple Leafs
F	28	Maxim Groshev	(Russia) SKA Saint Petersburg	(Russia) KHL	Tampa Bay Lightning

Source: IIHF.com

=== Sweden ===
- Head coach: (Sweden) Joel Rönnmark

Pos.	No.	Player	Team	League	NHL Rights
G	1	Jesper Wallstedt	(Sweden) Luleå HF	(Sweden) SHL	
G	30	Hugo Alnefelt	(Sweden) HV71	(Sweden) SHL	Tampa Bay Lightning
G	35	Calle Clang	(Sweden) Kristianstads IK	(Sweden) HockeyAllsvenskan	Pittsburgh Penguins
D	3	Tobias Björnfot [A]	(Sweden) Djurgårdens IF	(Sweden) SHL	Los Angeles Kings
D	4	Emil Andrae	(Sweden) HV71	(Sweden) SHL	Philadelphia Flyers
D	5	Philip Broberg [C]	(Sweden) Skellefteå AIK	(Sweden) SHL	Edmonton Oilers
D	6	Ludvig Hedström	(Sweden) Djurgårdens IF J20	(Sweden) J20 Nationell	
D	7	Gustav Berglund	(Sweden) Västerås IK	(Sweden) HockeyAllsvenskan	Detroit Red Wings
D	8	Victor Söderström [A]	(Sweden) AIK	(Sweden) HockeyAllsvenskan	Arizona Coyotes
D	9	Albert Johansson	(Sweden) Färjestad BK	(Sweden) SHL	Detroit Red Wings
D	26	Alex Brännstam	(Sweden) Djurgårdens IF	(Sweden) SHL	
F	10	Alexander Holtz	(Sweden) Djurgårdens IF	(Sweden) SHL	New Jersey Devils
F	13	Emil Heineman	(Sweden) Leksands IF	(Sweden) SHL	Florida Panthers
F	14	Arvid Costmar	(Sweden) Linköping HC	(Sweden) SHL	Vancouver Canucks
F	15	Simon Holmström	(Sweden) Vita Hästen	(Sweden) HockeyAllsvenskan	New York Islanders
F	16	Theodor Niederbach	(Sweden) Frölunda HC	(Sweden) SHL	Detroit Red Wings
F	17	Oskar Kvist	(Sweden) Brynäs IF	(Sweden) SHL	
F	18	Lucas Raymond	(Sweden) Frölunda HC	(Sweden) SHL	Detroit Red Wings
F	21	Oscar Bjerselius	(Sweden) Djurgårdens IF	(Sweden) SHL	
F	23	Jonathan Wikström	(Sweden) HV71	(Sweden) SHL	
F	24	Oskar Olausson	(Sweden) HV71	(Sweden) SHL	
F	25	Elmer Söderblom	(Sweden) Frölunda HC	(Sweden) SHL	Detroit Red Wings
F	27	Zion Nybeck	(Sweden) HV71	(Sweden) SHL	Carolina Hurricanes
F	28	Noel Gunler	(Sweden) Brynäs IF	(Sweden) SHL	Carolina Hurricanes
F	29	Albin Sundsvik [A]	(Sweden) Skellefteå AIK	(Sweden) SHL	Anaheim Ducks

Source: IIHF.com

=== United States ===
- Head coach: (United States) Nate Leaman

Pos.	No.	Player	Team	League	NHL Rights
G	29	Logan Stein	(United States) Ferris State	(United States) NCAA	
G	30	Spencer Knight	(United States) Boston College	(United States) NCAA	Chicago BlackHawks
G	32	Dustin Wolf	(United States) Everett Silvertips	(Canada) WHL	Calgary Flames
D	2	Drew Helleson	(United States) Boston College	(United States) NCAA	Colorado Avalanche
D	3	Henry Thrun	(United States) Dubuque Fighting Saints	(United States) USHL	Anaheim Ducks
D	4	Cameron York [C]	(United States) University of Michigan	(United States) NCAA	Philadelphia Flyers
D	5	Jackson LaCombe	(United States) University of Minnesota	(United States) NCAA	Anaheim Ducks
D	7	Tyler Kleven	(United States) University of North Dakota	(United States) NCAA	Ottawa Senators
D	8	Jake Sanderson	(United States) University of North Dakota	(United States) NCAA	Ottawa Senators
D	11	Brock Faber	(United States) University of Minnesota	(United States) NCAA	Los Angeles Kings
D	17	Hunter Skinner	(Canada) London Knights	(Canada) OHL	New York Rangers
D	23	Ryan Johnson	(United States) University of Minnesota	(United States) NCAA	Buffalo Sabres
F	9	Trevor Zegras	(United States) Boston University	(United States) NCAA	Anaheim Ducks
F	10	Matthew Beniers	(United States) University of Michigan	(United States) NCAA	
F	12	Matthew Boldy	(United States) Boston College	(United States) NCAA	Minnesota Wild
F	13	Cole Caufield [A]	(United States) University of Wisconsin	(United States) NCAA	Montreal Canadiens
F	15	Alex Turcotte [A]	(United States) Ontario Reign	AHL	Los Angeles Kings
F	18	Brendan Brisson	(United States) University of Michigan	(United States) NCAA	Vegas Golden Knights
F	19	Patrick Moynihan	(United States) Providence College	(United States) NCAA	New Jersey Devils
F	21	Brett Berard	(United States) Providence College	(United States) NCAA	New York Rangers
F	22	Sam Colangelo	(United States) Northeastern University	(United States) NCAA	Anaheim Ducks
F	24	Bobby Brink	(United States) University of Denver	(United States) NCAA	Philadelphia Flyers
F	25	John Farinacci	(United States) Muskegon Lumberjacks	(United States) USHL	Arizona Coyotes
F	26	Landon Slaggert	(United States) University of Notre Dame	(United States) NCAA	Chicago Blackhawks
F	28	Arthur Kaliyev	(United States) Ontario Reign	AHL	Los Angeles Kings

Source: IIHF.com
