= Something Remote =

- Webisode logo
- Directed by: Alex Laferriere
- Written by: Alex Laferriere
- Produced by: Nick Allain; Steve DiTullio
- Starring: C/J Haley; Rick Desilets; John Selig; Rebecca Davis; Sarah Neslusan; Matt Heron Duranti
- Cinematography: Alex Laferriere
- Edited by: Alex Laferriere; John Selig
- Music by: Talco
- Production company: Broken Wall Films
- Distributed by: IndieFlix
- Release date: September 14, 2009
- Running time: 92 minutes (original cut); 86 minutes (Plus Edit)
- Country: United States
- Language: English
- Budget: $150

Something Remote is a 2009 American independent comedy film. Filmed in Laferriere's apartment on a $150 budget, Something Remote was awarded "Best Feature" and "Funniest Flick" at the Silk City Flick Fest in 2009. Something Remote was also shown at Gen Con Indy 2010 and the 2010 Wanderings Film Festival. Local newspapers had positive reviews.

== Plot ==
Three friends wish for nothing more than to be left alone with the television and pizza. Neil is a regular working guy with a crazy ex-girlfriend who does everything in her power to get into the trio's apartment. Mat and Erik provide advice to their relationship plagued friend. Throughout the movie, the television is turned on, and the audience watches television right along with the three friends. The television material includes everything from original sketches to parodies of popular television shows. Talco, an internationally successful band, lends their talent to Something Remote's soundtrack and to the upbeat nature of the film.

== Cast ==
- C/J Haley as Neil Trembley: An office worker who is just coming out of a long-term relationship. His roommates are Mat and Erik.
- Rick Desilets as Matthias "Mat" Highland: An argumentative couch-potato. His roommates are Neil and Erik, and he is an antagonist of Neil's girlfriend Lisa.
- John Selig as Erik Goulding
- Sarah Neslusan as Shannon: One of Neil's friends, and girlfriend of Skott. She has a poor relationship with Mat.
- Rebecca Gray Davis - as Rebecca Davis aka Lisa
- Matt Heron Duranti as Scott
- Sammi Lappin as Abby
- Jeffrey Desautels as Bruce
- Hunter Giles as Homeless Al

== Web series ==
Something Remote ran again on EarthsMightiest.com with new content organized and produced by Rick Desilets. Along with the original webisodes, interviews with Laferriere, Allain, DiTullio, Haley, Selig, Duranti, and Neslusan were released, as well as a short titled "Mantequilla Magica" and the theatrical trailer for Command & Conquer 3: The Forgotten. A preview of the feature-length film was released the week after the series finale.

=== Episodes ===
Something Remote episodes
#	Title	Length	Featuring	Initial Release	Re-release	Prod. Code
1	"Something Broken"	5:13		June 28, 2009	May 16, 2010	SR201
2	"Something Popping"	2:31		July 5, 2009	May 23, 2010	SR203
N/A	"Mantequilla Magica"	1:13	Brandon Vogel, Jon Zoll, Sarah Lofgren		May 26, 2010	SR212
3	"Something Busted"	3:43	Dustin Deren	July 12, 2009	May 30, 2010	SR206
4	"Something Lost in Time"	4:52		July 19, 2009	June 6, 2010	SR204
5	"Something in Aisle 3"	3:44		July 27, 2009	June 13, 2010	SR208
6	"Something Tastes Like Fungus"	3:10	Alex Laferriere	August 2, 2009	June 20, 2010	SR207
7	"Something Naked"	2:53		August 9, 2009	June 27, 2010	SR205
8	"Something Between Friends"	6:07	Steve Harwick, Jim Perry	August 17, 2009	July 4, 2010	SR209
9	"Something Not Safe For Work"	3:51	Matt Heron Duranti, Steve DiTullio, Jon Zoll	August 23, 2009	July 11, 2010	SR210
10	"Boobs, Battles, and Violence"	8:52	Matt Heron Duranti, Sarah Neslusan, Dustin Deren	August 30, 2009	July 18, 2010	SR211
11	"Something on the Couch"	1:47		September 6, 2009	July 25, 2010	SR202
