= Broken Wall Films =

American film company

Broken Wall Films, LLC
- Company type: Private
- Industry: Film
- Predecessor: Collective Studios
- Founded: Charlton, MA, USA (June 11, 2010)
- Founder: Alex Laferriere, Nick Allain
- Headquarters: Worcester, Massachusetts, USA
- Products: Something Remote
- Owner: Alex Laferriere, Nick Allain, Steve DiTullio
- Subsidiaries: The PodSmiths Network
- Website: BrokenWallFilms.com; PodSmiths.com

Broken Wall Films, LLC (commonly known as Broken Wall Films or simply Broken Wall) is an American independent film company based in Worcester, Massachusetts.

== Background ==
In 2006, Alex Laferriere and Nick Allain and their group of close friends started creating films under the banner of Broken Wall Films, after the collapse of Project Zombie, a zombie horror short film that never finished production while the group was known as Collective Studios. Most of its early productions were shorts and short films written and directed by Laferriere and produced by Allain. In 2009, Broken Wall Films released Something Remote, its first feature-length film, and since then has expanded into web series, video game cutscene, and podcast production. The Command & Conquer 3 mod The Forgotten is the first Command & Conquer mod to include full-motion video, as produced by Broken Wall Films.

Broken Wall Films frequently employs a repertory set of actors that consist of the company's friends and family. The group's films have featured a multitude of recurring actors including Rebecca Davis, Dustin Deren, Rick Desilets, Jacob Grzyb, C/J Haley, Matt Heron-Duranti, Eric Kolodziecjzak, Mallory Laferriere, Sarah Neslusan, Rayne Purcell, John Selig, Brandon Vogel, Andrew Wilkins, and Jon Zoll.

On January 8, 2011, following an episode in which frequent Broken Wall Films contributor Rick Desilets announced his own podcast, The D-Pad, Laferriere and DiTullio officially announced PodSmiths, a subsidiary network of Broken Wall Films for the production and distribution of podcasts. Along with Open Lounge and The D-Pad, Nick Allain will also host a podcast called Paradox Today, and Laferriere will additionally host an informative podcast called Coffee Jive. The PodSmiths network launched on February 3, 2011.

== Filmography ==
Broken Wall Films has done a variety of film projects in different styles and genres. Currently, the company is in pre-production of an unknown project.

=== Shorts ===
- "Cracked" (2007)
- "24/Lost Microwaves" (2008)
- "Mantequilla Magica" (2009)
- "Travels with Steve" (2009)

=== Full-motion video ===
- Command & Conquer 3: The Forgotten (Note: Broken Wall Films was only responsible for the filming of FMV cutscenes for use in C&C Labs' Command & Conquer mod.) (PC, 2010)
- Unnamed video game app (upcoming, 2011)

=== Swedes ===
- Army of Darkness, sweded (2009)
- Anchorman: The Legend of Ron Burgundy, sweded (upcoming)

=== Short films ===
- His Face Is a Mass of Entrails (2008)
- Alone with Your Thoughts (2008)
- Rios Locos: A Hero Lost (2008)
- Rios Locos: Crisis Uncovered (2009)

=== Web series ===
- Something Remote (2009)

=== Podcasts ===
- Independent podcasts
  - Open Lounge (Saturdays, launched April 10, 2010, moved February 3, 2011 — 41 episodes, 12 specials) (Note: Open Lounge aired independently until the official launch of The PodSmiths Network on February 3, 2011. It has since aired under the PodSmiths banner.)
- The PodSmiths Network (launched February 3, 2011)
  - Open Lounge (Saturdays, added February 3, 2011 — 16 episodes)
  - Paradox Today (Mondays, launched March 28, 2011 — 8 episodes)
  - The D-Pad (Sundays, launched April 3, 2011 — 8 episodes, 1 special)
  - Coffee Jive (weekdays, upcoming)

=== Feature films ===
- Something Remote (2009)
