= Ryan Bischel =

American former ice hockey player (born 1999)

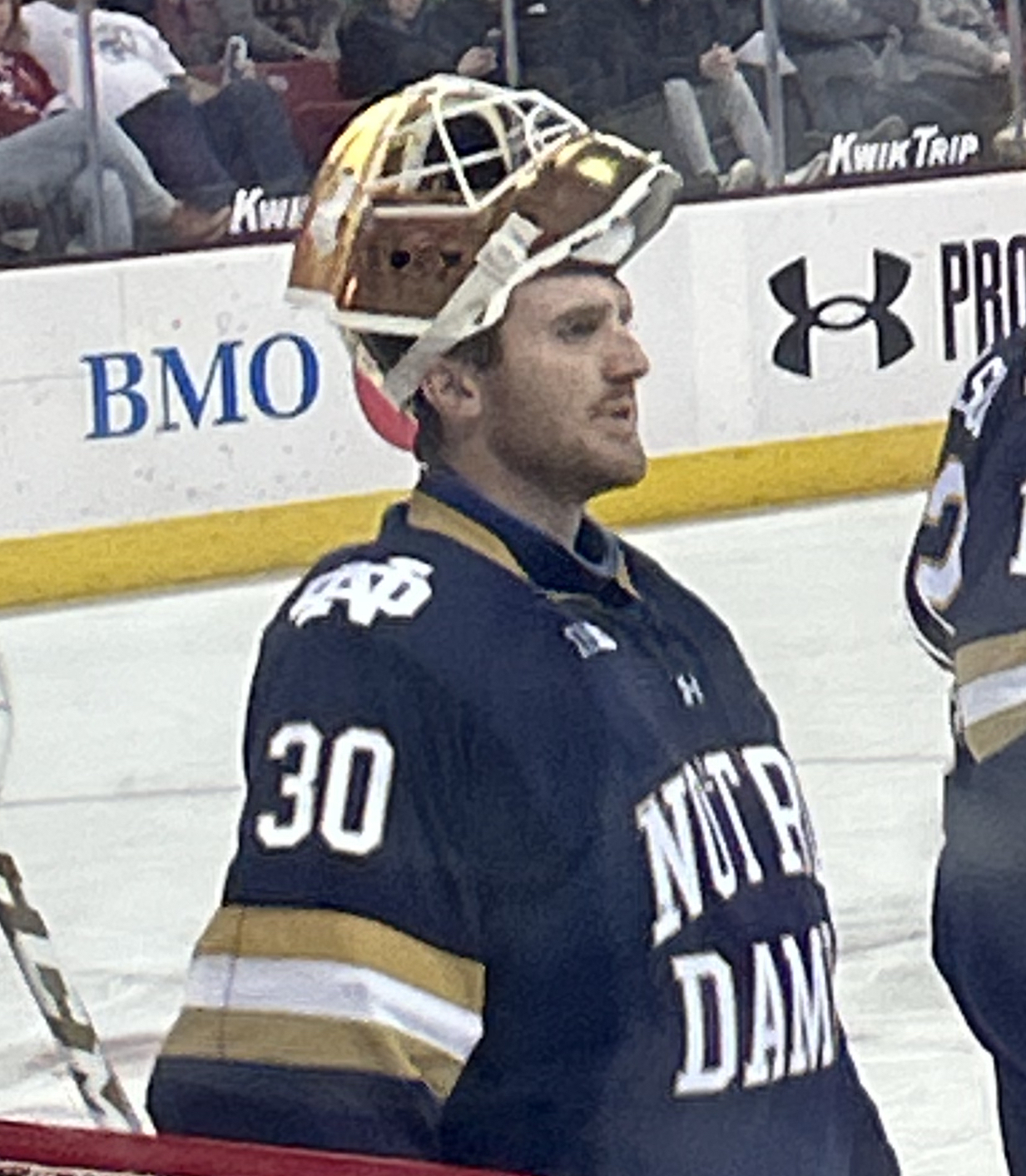
- Bischel playing with the Notre Dame Fighting Irish in February 2024 at the Kohl Center
- Born: July 5, 1999 (age 27) Medina, Minnesota, U.S.
- Height: 6 ft 1 in (185 cm)
- Weight: 190 lb (86 kg; 13 st 8 lb)
- Position: Goaltender
- Caught: Left
- Played for: Maine Mariners
- NHL draft: Undrafted
- Playing career: 2024–2025

Ryan Bischel (born July 5, 1999) is an American former professional ice hockey goaltender who played for the Maine Mariners of the ECHL while under contract to the Providence Bruins of the American Hockey League (AHL).

== Playing career ==
=== College ===
Bischel began his collegiate career for Notre Dame during the 2019–20 season, where he served as the backup goaltender behind starter Cale Morris. He appeared in seven games and posted a 3–1–0 record with a 2.52 goals against average (GAA) and .915 save percentage. During the 2020–21 season, he appeared in nine games, and posted a 3–4–1 record with a 2.87 GAA and .890 save percentage, serving as a backup to Dylan St. Cyr. During the 2021–22 season, he appeared in 16 games, and posted a 10–4–0 record with a 2.08 GAA and .924 save percentage, splitting starting time with Matthew Galajda.

During the 2022–23 season he started all 37 games, and posted a 16–16–4 record with a 2.39 GAA and .931 save percentage. During the regular season, he led the conference in saves, save percentage and minutes played. His .931 save percentage ranked second nationally, while his 1,183 saves led all collegiate goaltenders. He finished second in program history in season saves, behind Lance Madson (1988–89) with 1,288 and second in season save percentage behind Morris and St. Cyr. Following the season he was named a semifinalist for the Big Ten Player of the Year and Mike Richter Award. He won the Big Ten Goaltender of the Year award and was named to the All-Big Ten First Team and named an AHCA West Second Team All-American. He became Notre Dame's 16th All-American in program history.

In March 2023, Bischel announced he would use his COVID-19 pandemic extra year of eligibility and return to Notre Dame for a fifth season. He finished his collegiate career with the sixth-best GAA (2.46) and second-best save percentage (.924) in program history.

=== Professional ===
On March 18, 2024, Bischel signed a one-year AHL contract with the Providence Bruins for the 2024–25 season on March 18, 2024. On April 8, 2024, he signed an amateur tryout (ATO) with the Bruins for the remainder of the 2023–24 season. He was released from his ATO on April 15, 2024.

== Career statistics ==
			Regular season									Playoffs
Season	Team	League	GP	W	L	T/OT	MIN	GA	SO	GAA	SV%	GP	W	L	MIN	GA	SO	GAA	SV%
2016–17	Fargo Force	USHL	16	6	4	0	707	26	0	2.21	.904	—	—	—	—	—	—	—	—
2017–18	Fargo Force	USHL	29	15	8	3	1,664	62	3	2.24	.920	—	—	—	—	—	—	—	—
2018–19	Fargo Force	USHL	55	28	20	5	3,205	136	2	2.55	.905	—	—	—	—	—	—	—	—
2019–20	University of Notre Dame	B1G	7	3	1	0	285	12	0	2.52	.915	—	—	—	—	—	—	—	—
2020–21	University of Notre Dame	B1G	9	3	4	1	481	23	0	2.87	.890	—	—	—	—	—	—	—	—
2021–22	University of Notre Dame	B1G	16	10	4	1	922	32	2	2.08	.924	—	—	—	—	—	—	—	—
2022–23	University of Notre Dame	B1G	37	16	16	4	2,183	87	5	2.39	.931	—	—	—	—	—	—	—	—
2023–24	University of Notre Dame	B1G	36	15	19	2	2,112	91	3	2.58	.924	—	—	—	—	—	—	—	—
2024–25	Maine Mariners	ECHL	28	12	15	1	1626	88	1	3.25	.885	—	—	—	—	—	—	—	—
NCAA totals			105	47	44	7	5,983	245	10	2.46	.924	—	—	—	—	—	—	—	—

== Awards and honors ==
Award	Year
College
Big Ten Goaltender of the Year	2023
All-Big Ten Second Team	2023
AHCA West Second Team All-American	2023

Awards and achievements
Preceded by Jakub Dobeš	Big Ten Goaltender of the Year; 2022–23	Succeeded by Kyle McClellan
