= Kyle McClellan (ice hockey) =

American ice hockey player (born 1999)

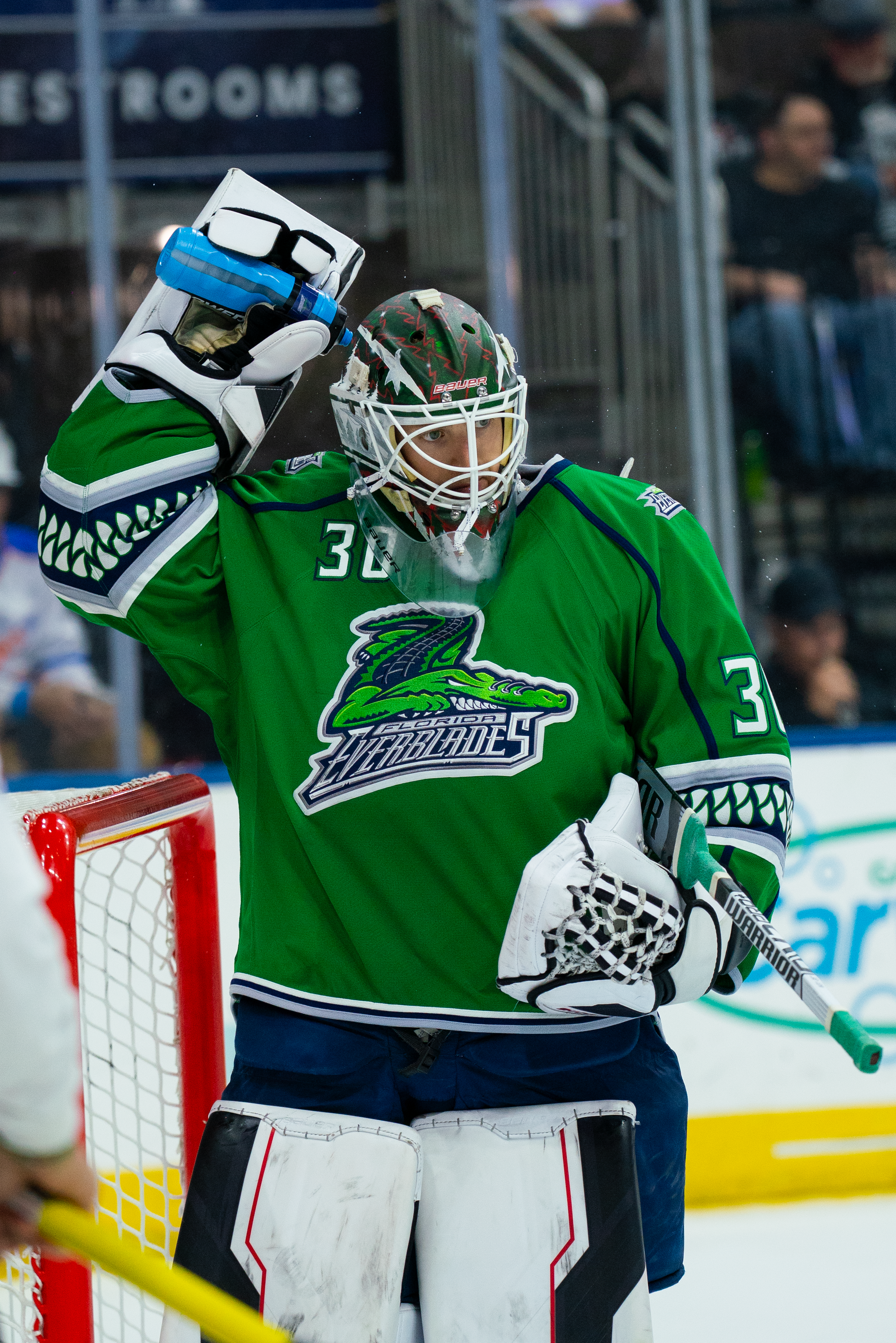
- McClellan with the Florida Everblades in April 2026
- Born: March 18, 1999 (age 27) Manchester, Missouri, U.S.
- Height: 6 ft 1 in (185 cm)
- Weight: 185 lb (84 kg; 13 st 3 lb)
- Position: Goaltender
- Catches: Left
- ECHL team Former teams: Florida Everblades; Iowa Heartlanders; Cincinnati Cyclones
- NHL draft: Undrafted
- Playing career: 2024–present

Kyle McClellan (born March 18, 1999) is an American professional ice hockey goaltender for the Florida Everblades of the ECHL. He played college ice hockey at Mercyhurst and Wisconsin. He won the Mike Richter Award as a senior in 2024.

== Playing career ==
=== College ===
McClellan began his college ice hockey at Mercyhurst during the 2020–21 season. During his freshman year he made six starts for the Lakers, and posted a 2–4–0 record, with a 2.03 goals against average (GAA) and .932 save percentage. He recorded his first career shutout on February 19, 2021, against Niagara. During the 2021–22 season, in his sophomore year, he made 26 starts, and posted a 12–13–2 record, with a 2.56 GAA and .932 save percentage.

In April 2022, McClellan transferred to Wisconsin. During the 2022–23 season, in his junior year, he served as backup goaltender to Jared Moe, and posted a 3–6–0 record in 12 starts, with a 3.57 GAA and .883 save percentage.

During the 2023–24 season, in his senior year, he posted a 24–12–1 record, with a 1.94 GAA, and .931 save percentage. He helped lead Wisconsin from last place in the conference the previous year to the Big Ten Conference's runner-up and earned an NCAA Tournament berth. He led the NCAA with a .931 save percentage and seven shutouts, ranked second with a 1.94 GAA and fourth with 24 victories. His seven shutouts ranks second on Wisconsin's single-season list, one shy of the program record eight set by Brian Elliott in 2006. Following an outstanding season he was named All-Big Ten First Team, Big Ten Goaltender of the Year and a top-ten finalist for the Hobey Baker Award. He was also named the Mike Richter Award winner and a AHCA West Second Team All-American. He became the first Badger goaltender to be named an All-American since Brian Elliott in 2006.

He finished his collegiate career with an overall record of 41–35–3, with a 2.35 GAA and .926 save percentage in 82 games.

=== Professional ===
On April 8, 2024, McClellan signed an amateur tryout (ATO) with the Iowa Wild of the AHL for the remainder of the 2023–24 AHL season, and a one-year, one-way contract for the 2024–25 season.

== Personal life ==
McClellan was born to Rich and Julie McClellan, and has one brother, Chase. He earned an undergraduate degree in personal finance and is pursuing a master's degree in real estate.

== Career statistics ==
			Regular season									Playoffs
Season	Team	League	GP	W	L	OT	MIN	GA	SO	GAA	SV%	GP	W	L	MIN	GA	SO	GAA	SV%
2018–19	Austin Bruins	NAHL	44	22	17	4	2,547	98	5	2.31	.915	4	1	3	—	—	0	2.54	.912
2019–20	Omaha Lancers	USHL	32	16	7	4	1,657	66	3	2.39	.909	—	—	—	—	—	—	—	—
2020–21	Mercyhurst University	AHA	6	2	4	0	355	12	1	2.03	.932	—	—	—	—	—	—	—	—
2021–22	Mercyhurst University	AHA	27	12	13	2	1,617	69	3	2.56	.932	—	—	—	—	—	—	—	—
2022–23	University of Wisconsin	B1G	12	3	6	0	571	34	0	3.57	.883	—	—	—	—	—	—	—	—
2023–24	University of Wisconsin	B1G	37	24	12	1	2,198	71	7	1.94	.931	—	—	—	—	—	—	—	—
2024–25	Iowa Heartlanders	ECHL	35	15	15	5	2,132	93	2	2.62	.898	3	1	1	145	11	0	4.54	.855
2025–26	Cincinnati Cyclones	ECHL	12	3	6	1	604	45	0	4.47	.850	—	—	—	—	—	—	—	—
2025–26	Florida Everblades	ECHL	3	3	0	0	180	3	1	1.00	.952	—	—	—	—	—	—	—	—
ECHL totals			45	21	21	6	2,916	141	3	2.90	.889	3	1	1	145	11	0	4.54	.855

== Awards and honors ==
Award	Year
College
All-Big Ten First Team	2024
Big Ten Goaltender of the Year	2024
Mike Richter Award	2024
AHCA West Second Team All-American	2024

Awards and achievements
Preceded by Ryan Bischel	Big Ten Goaltender of the Year; 2023–24	Succeeded by Trey Augustine
Preceded by Devon Levi	Mike Richter Award; 2023–24	Succeeded by Jacob Fowler
