= 2019 World Junior A Challenge =

Tournament details
- Host country: Canada
- Venue(s): EnCana Events Centre in Dawson Creek, British Columbia
- Dates: 7–15 December

Final positions
- Champions: Russia (1st title)
- Runner-up: Canada East
- Third place: United States
- Fourth place: Czech Republic

Tournament statistics
- Games played: 14
- Goals scored: 84 (6 per game)
- Scoring leader(s): (United States) Brendan Brisson (12 points)

Awards
- MVP: (Canada) Devon Levi

The 2019 World Junior A Challenge was an international Junior "A" ice hockey tournament organized by Hockey Canada. It was hosted in Dawson Creek, British Columbia, from December 7–15, 2019, at the EnCana Events Centre.

== Preliminary round ==
All times are local (UTC-7).

Pos	Team	Pld	W	OTW	OTL	L	GF	GA	GD	Pts	Qualification
1	United States	4	3	1	0	0	22	11	+11	11	Semifinals
2	Czech Republic	4	2	1	1	0	18	15	+3	9	Semifinals
3	Russia	4	0	1	2	1	8	14	−6	4 (Note: Russia 3–2 (OT) Canada East)	Semifinals
4	Canada East	4	1	0	1	2	14	17	−3	4	Semifinals
5	Canada West	4	0	1	0	3	7	12	−5	2	

Source: hockeycanada.ca
Rules for classification: 1) points; 2) head-to-head points; 3) head-to-head goal difference; 4) head-to-head number of goals scored; 5) result against closest best-ranked team outside tied teams; 6) result against second-best ranked team outside tied teams; 7) seeding before tournament.
Notes:

7 December 2019; 14:00	Russia	3–2 OT (0–0, 1–1, 1–1) (OT: 1–0)	Canada East	EnCana Events Centre, Dawson Creek

Game reference
10 min	Penalties	8 min
33	Shots	31

7 December 2019; 19:00	United States	3–2 (0–0, 2–2, 1–0)	Canada West	EnCana Events Centre, Dawson Creek

Game reference
8 min	Penalties	6 min
39	Shots	28

8 December 2019; 14:00	Czech Republic	4–3 OT (0–2, 3–1, 0–0) (OT: 1–0)	Russia	EnCana Events Centre, Dawson Creek

Game reference
16 min	Penalties	10 min
29	Shots	34

8 December 2019; 19:00	Canada West	1–5 (1–2, 0–1, 0–2)	Canada East	EnCana Events Centre, Dawson Creek

Game reference
6 min	Penalties	12 min
30	Shots	27

9 December 2019; 19:00	Czech Republic	4–5 OT (0–2, 3–1, 1–1) (OT: 0–1)	United States	EnCana Events Centre, Dawson Creek

Game reference
6 min	Penalties	22 min
18	Shots	37

11 December 2019; 14:00	Russia	0–1 OT (0–0, 0–0, 0–0) (OT: 0–0) (SO: 0–1)	Canada West	EnCana Events Centre, Dawson Creek

Game reference
12 min	Penalties	10 min
25	Shots	31

11 December 2019; 19:00	Canada East	3–7 (1–1, 1–5, 1–1)	United States	EnCana Events Centre, Dawson Creek

Game reference
12 min	Penalties	8 min
23	Shots	38

12 December 2019; 19:00	Canada West	3–4 (0–4, 3–0, 0–0)	Czech Republic	EnCana Events Centre, Dawson Creek

Game reference
8 min	Penalties	43 min
26	Shots	27

13 December 2019; 14:00	United States	7–2 (1–0, 2–1, 4–1)	Russia	EnCana Events Centre, Dawson Creek

Game reference
8 min	Penalties	20 min
45	Shots	29

13 December 2019; 19:00	Canada East	4–6 (3–1, 0–3, 1–2)	Czech Republic	EnCana Events Centre, Dawson Creek

Game reference
12 min	Penalties	6 min
30	Shots	39

== Playoff round ==
=== Bracket ===
Semifinals
14 December
Canada East (GWS)	2
United States	1
14 December
Russia	5
Czech Republic	1

Gold medal game
15 December
Canada East	1
Russia (OT)	2
Bronze medal game
15 December
Czech Republic	1
United States (OT)	2

=== Semifinals ===
14 December 2019; 14:00	Canada East	2–1 GWS (0–0, 1–0, 0–1) (OT: 0–0) (SO: 1–0)	United States	EnCana Events Centre, Dawson Creek

Game reference
Devon Levi	Goalies	Logan Stein
Mosley (Alexander, Martino) (PP) – 21:38 / 1–0; / 1–1 / 40:24 – Fontaine (Farrell, Koster)
Laframboise (miss); Alexander; Tinling (miss); Tremblay	Shootout	(miss) Fontaine; (miss) Brisson; (miss) Colangelo; (miss) Farrell
12 min	Penalties	8 min
24	Shots	42

14 December 2019; 19:00	Russia	5–1 (4–0, 1–0, 0–1)	Czech Republic	EnCana Events Centre, Dawson Creek

Game reference

Yegor Guskov
Goalies
Jan Škorpík
Jakub Dobeš

Gushchin (Didkovski, Kirsanov) – 03:06	1–0
Tyutnev (Pashin, Chayka) – 04:32	2–0
Tyutnev (Pashin, Ponomaryov) – 10:34	3–0
Tyutnev (Grushnikov, Kirsanov) – 17:14	4–0
Gushchin (Didkovski, Grushnikov) – 36:45	5–0
	5–1	53:37 – Morong (Poppel)

14 min
Penalties
8 min
28
Shots
21

=== Bronze medal game ===
15 December 2019; 12:00	Czech Republic	1–2 OT (0–0, 0–0, 1–1) (OT: 0–1)	United States	EnCana Events Centre, Dawson Creek

Game reference

Jakub Dobeš
Goalies
Ethan Haider

	0–1	45:18 – Farrell (Berger, Miller)
Poizl (Pšenička, Najman) (EA) – 59:55	1–1
	1–2	72:14 – Kuntar (Koster, Knies)

37 min
Penalties
20 min
38
Shots
31

=== Gold medal game ===
15 December 2019; 17:00	Canada East	1–2 OT (0–0, 0–0, 1–1) (OT: 0–0, 0–1)	Russia	EnCana Events Centre, Dawson Creek

Game reference

Devon Levi
Goalies
Yegor Guskov

	0–1	55:39 – Tyutnev (Ponomaryov, Pashin)
Alexander (O'Hara, Chapleau) (PP2, EA) – 58:58	1–1
	1–2	85:43 – Mukhamadullin (Kirsanov, Didkovski) (PP)

4 min
Penalties
16 min
32
Shots
38

== Awards ==
- MVP: (Canada) Devon Levi
- All-Star Team
  - Goaltender: (Russia) Yegor Guskov
  - Defencemen: (Canada) Philippe Chapleau / (Russia) Daniil Chayka
  - Forwards: (United States) Brendan Brisson / (United States) Gunnarwolfe Fontaine / (Canada) Ryland Mosley
