= Brett Berard =

American ice hockey player (born 2002)

- Born: September 9, 2002 (age 24) East Greenwich, Rhode Island, U.S.
- Height: 5 ft 9 in (175 cm)
- Weight: 175 lb (79 kg; 12 st 7 lb)
- Position: Left wing
- Shoots: Left
- NHL team Former teams: Montreal Canadiens; New York Rangers
- NHL draft: 134th overall, 2020; New York Rangers
- Playing career: 2023–present

Brett Berard (born September 9, 2002) is an American professional ice hockey player who is a left winger for the Montreal Canadiens of the National Hockey League (NHL). He was selected in the fifth round, 134th overall, by the New York Rangers in the 2020 NHL entry draft. Internationally, Berard won a gold medal with the United States national junior team at the 2021 World Junior Championships.

== Playing career ==
Berard was selected by the New York Rangers in the fifth round (134th overall) of the 2020 NHL entry draft. Prior to this, he was a member of the USA Hockey National Team Development Program before committing to play collegiately for the Providence Friars beginning in 2020–21.

At the onset of the 2022–23 season, Journal News reporter Vincent Z. Mercogliano rated Berard as one of the Rangers' best prospects. Following his junior season with Providence, he signed his first NHL contract with the organization and was assigned to their American Hockey League (AHL) affiliate, the Hartford Wolf Pack, in March 2023.

The following season, Berard played the entire 2023–24 campaign with Hartford, and led his team in goals with 25. Collectively, his output also finished third amongst all AHL rookies leaguewide.

Despite playing much of the 2024–25 season with a torn labrum, Berard had a strong training camp with the Rangers and was one of their last cuts before the start of the regular season. In late November, he was recalled by the Rangers and registered an assist in his NHL debut on November 25, 2024, against the St. Louis Blues. Berard then scored his first career NHL goal in his next game against the Carolina Hurricanes on November 27.

On June 26, 2026, Berard was traded by the Rangers to the Montreal Canadiens in exchange for defenseman William Trudeau. Entering the offseason as a restricted free agent, he was tendered a qualifying offer by the Canadiens three days later. Thereafter, Berard agreed to a one-year, two-way contract with the team on July 9.

== International play ==
Medal record

Men's ice hockey

Representing the United States

World Junior Championships
Gold medal – first place	2021 Canada	

Berard was a member of the United States national junior team at both the 2021 and 2022 World Junior Championships. He was the second youngest member of the 2021 team (to Matty Beniers) where his team won gold. The following year, the Americans were upset by Czechia in the quarterfinals.

In April 2025, he was named to the United States national senior team for the 2025 World Championship. However, Berard was ultimately not able to compete due to injury.

== Playing style ==
Standing at just 5 feet 9 inches tall, size has always been an issue for Berard as a hockey player. However, his fast skating along with grit and tenacity helps compensate for this deficiency. One NHL scout labeled him as "a [jerk] to play against". Others have described him as "efficient at getting inside and establishing shooting positions, using his smallish stature to stay compact and gain leverage at tough angles." According to Berard personally:

I actually like to use my size to my advantage. It’s a lot easier to escape against bigger opponents and in the corners I actually feel like I have an advantage being on the smaller side and getting in and out of corners to be able to make plays. A lot of people say it’s a disadvantage but I like to take it as an advantage and use my size as a strength. I definitely wouldn’t be able to do some of the things that I’m able to do if I was bigger. So, I like my size and I like where I’m at.

Over the course of the 2023–24 season, Berard improved his skating speed as well as his shooting ability, developing a quick release.

== Personal life ==
Berard's younger brother Brady is also an ice hockey player who is a member of the Boston College Eagles. The siblings had always been competitive against each other growing up.

His father, David, had previously been an assistant coach for Providence College and now serves as head coach for the Stonehill Skyhawks.

== Career statistics ==
=== Regular season and playoffs ===
			Regular season					Playoffs
Season	Team	League	GP	G	A	Pts	PIM	GP	G	A	Pts	PIM
2018–19	U.S. National Development Team	USHL	27	5	7	12	12	2	0	0	0	2
2019–20	U.S. National Development Team	USHL	13	7	11	18	18	—	—	—	—	—
2020–21	Providence College	HE	19	5	5	10	16	—	—	—	—	—
2021–22	Providence College	HE	36	18	20	38	37	—	—	—	—	—
2022–23	Providence College	HE	36	10	14	24	35	—	—	—	—	—
2022–23	Hartford Wolf Pack	AHL	3	0	0	0	0	—	—	—	—	—
2023–24	Hartford Wolf Pack	AHL	71	25	23	48	62	10	1	5	6	6
2024–25	Hartford Wolf Pack	AHL	30	9	14	23	43	—	—	—	—	—
2024–25	New York Rangers	NHL	35	6	4	10	8	—	—	—	—	—
2025–26	Hartford Wolf Pack	AHL	41	6	16	22	53	—	—	—	—	—
2025–26	New York Rangers	NHL	13	0	0	0	6	—	—	—	—	—
NHL totals			48	6	4	10	8	—	—	—	—	—

=== International ===
Year	Team	Event	Result	GP	G	A	Pts	PIM
2018	United States	U17	8th	5	0	2	2	6
2021	United States	WJC	1st place, gold medalist(s)	7	1	4	5	0
2022	United States	WJC	5th	5	1	0	1	29
Junior totals				17	2	6	8	35

== Awards and honors ==
Award	Year	Ref
USHL
USA Hockey All-American Game	2020	
College
All-Hockey East Third Team	2022	
New England D1 All-Stars	2022	
