= Big Ten Men's Ice Hockey Goaltender of the Year =

Big Ten Goaltender of the Year
- Sport: Ice hockey
- Awarded for: The Goaltender of the Year in the Big Ten

History
- First award: 2014
- Most recent: Trey Augustine

The Big Ten Goaltender of the Year is an annual award given out at the conclusion of the Big Ten regular season to the best goalie in the conference as voted by a media panel and the head coaches of each team.

The Goaltender of the Year was first awarded in 2014 and is a successor to the CCHA Best Goaltender which was discontinued after the conference dissolved due to the 2013–14 NCAA conference realignment.

== Award winners ==
Year	Winner	School
2013–14	Adam Wilcox	Minnesota
2014–15	Jake Hildebrand	Michigan State
2015–16	Eric Schierhorn	Minnesota
2016–17	Eric Schierhorn	Minnesota
2017–18	Cale Morris	Notre Dame
2018–19	Tommy Nappier	Ohio State
2019–20	Strauss Mann	Michigan
2020–21	Jack LaFontaine	Minnesota
2021–22	Jakub Dobeš	Ohio State
2022–23	Ryan Bischel	Notre Dame
2023–24	Kyle McClellan	Wisconsin
2024–25	Trey Augustine	Michigan State
2025–26	Trey Augustine	Michigan State

=== Winners by school ===
School	Winners
Minnesota	4
Michigan State	3
Notre Dame	2
Ohio State	2
Michigan	1
Wisconsin	1
