= Trey Augustine =

American ice hockey player (born 2005)

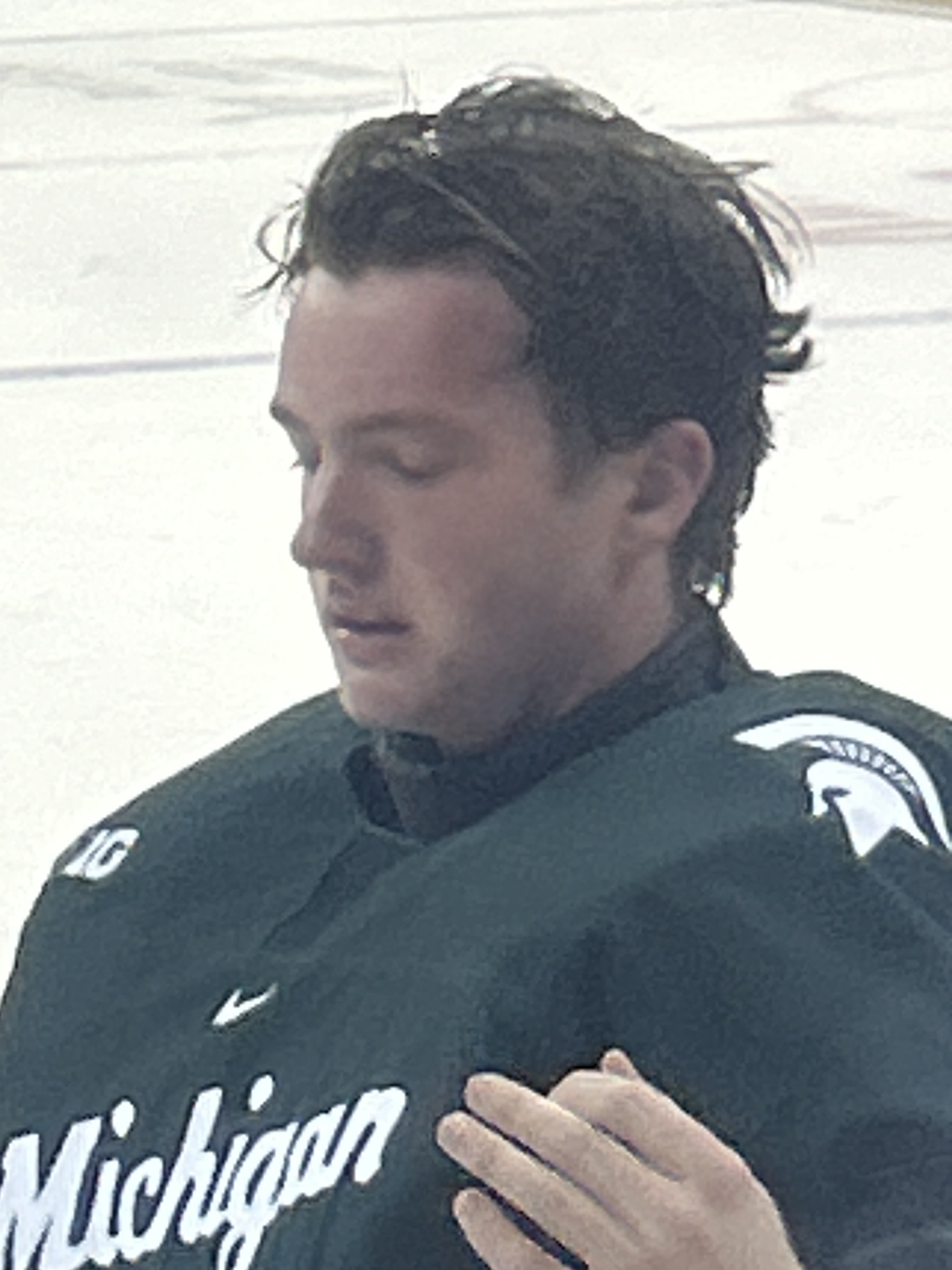
- Augustine with Michigan State in December 2024
- Born: February 23, 2005 (age 21) South Lyon, Michigan, U.S.
- Height: 6 ft 1 in (185 cm)
- Weight: 183 lb (83 kg; 13 st 1 lb)
- Position: Goaltender
- Catches: Left
- NHL team (P) Cur. team: Detroit Red Wings; Grand Rapids Griffins (AHL)
- National team: United States
- NHL draft: 41st overall, 2023; Detroit Red Wings
- Playing career: 2026–present

Kenneth James "Trey" Augustine III (born February 23, 2005) is an American professional ice hockey goaltender playing for the Grand Rapids Griffins of the American Hockey League (AHL) while under contract to the Detroit Red Wings of the National Hockey League (NHL). He was drafted 41st overall by the Red Wings in the 2023 NHL entry draft.

== Playing career ==
=== Junior ===
Augustine spent two seasons with the USA Hockey National Team Development Program (NTDP). During the 2021–22 season, he was the starter for the U17 team and appeared in 23 games and posted a 7–9–0 record, with a 3.23 goals against average (GAA) and a .899 save percentage. During the 2022–23 season, he appeared in 34 games and posted a 30–1–2 record, with a 2.13 GAA and a .926 save percentage. His .926 save percentage was a NTDP single-season record for a goaltender who appeared in more than 10 games. His 2.13 GAA and the 30 wins both ranked fourth all time in program history.

On June 29, 2023, Augustine was drafted in the second round, 41st overall, by the Detroit Red Wings in the 2023 NHL entry draft.

=== College ===
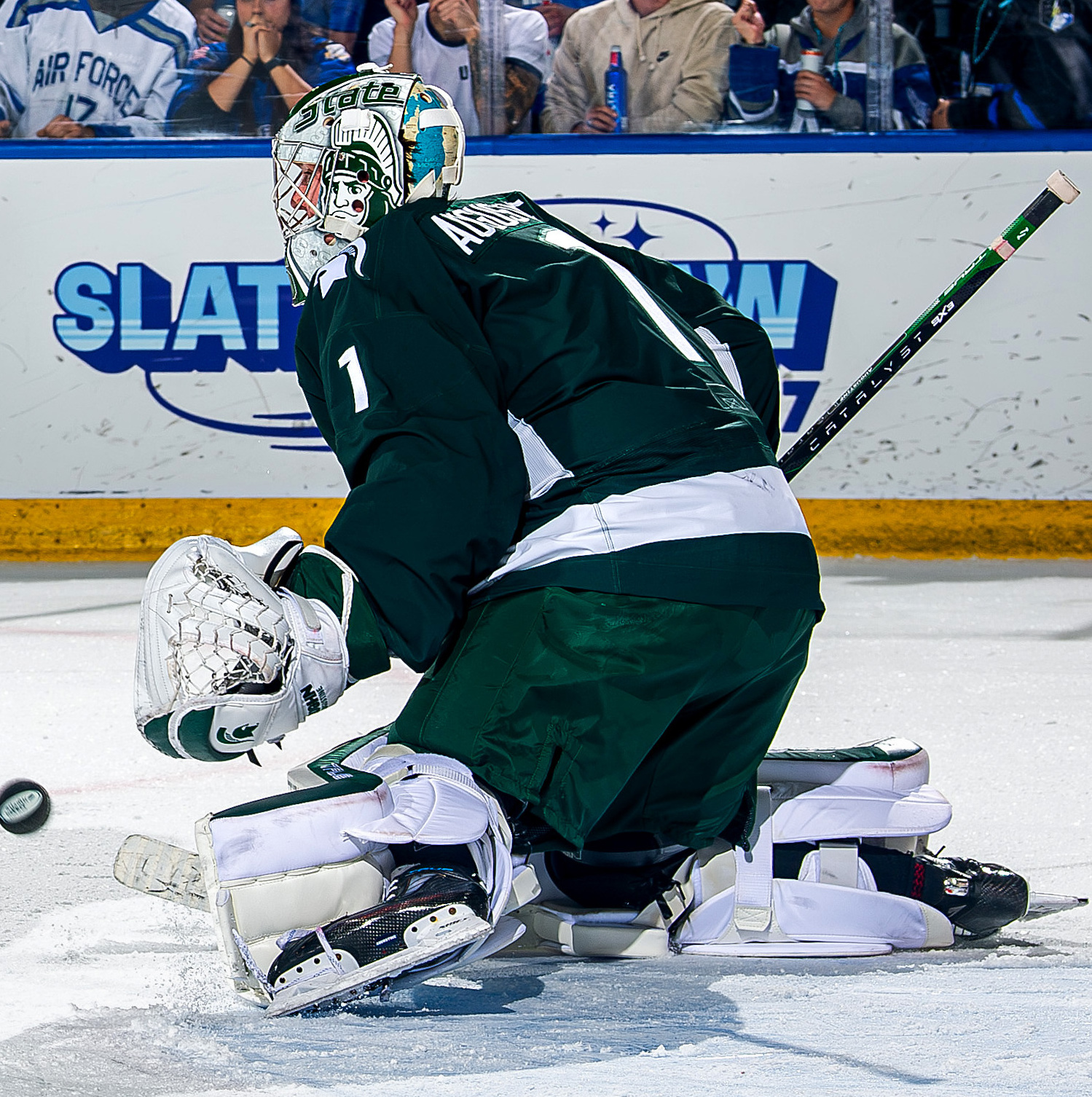
Augustine with Michigan State in December 2023

Augustine was originally committed to play college ice hockey for Michigan, however, after former head coach Mel Pearson was fired, he reopened his recruitment process. On September 7, 2022, he committed to play for Michigan State. He began his collegiate career during the 2023–24 season, where he was the youngest goaltender in NCAA Division I hockey. On November 3, 2023, Augustine recorded his first career shutout in a 6–0 victory against Ohio State. He finished the regular season with a 20–8–2 in, a 2.92 GAA, and .917 save percentage. He ranked third nationally in saves with 979. He was one of six goalies nationally to reach 20 wins and was the first player at Michigan State to reach the milestone since Jeff Lerg in 2007–08. On March 1, 2024, Augustine made 44 saves, as Michigan State defeated No. 4 Wisconsin 5–2 to win their first Big Ten Conference regular season championship in program history. He was named a semifinalist for the Mike Richter Award, becoming the second semifinalist in program history, following Jake Hildebrand in 2015.

During the 2024–25 season, in his sophomore year, he posted a 19–7–4 record, with a 2.08 GAA, and .924 save percentage. During conference play he finished with a conference-best 12 wins, a 2.02 GAA, a .927 save percentage, while recording the second-most saves (553). Following the season he was named to the All-Big Ten First Team and the Big Ten Goaltender of the Year.

=== Professional ===
Augustine signed a three-year, entry level contract beginning in the 2026–27 season with the Detroit Red Wings on March 31, 2026, and reported to the Grand Rapids Griffins on an amateur try-out contract for the remainder of the 2025–26 AHL season.

== International play ==
Medal record

Representing United States

Ice hockey

World Junior Championships
Gold medal – first place	2024 Sweden	
Gold medal – first place	2025 Canada	
Bronze medal – third place	2023 Canada	

World U18 Championships
Gold medal – first place	2023 Switzerland	
Silver medal – second place	2022 Germany	

Augustine represented the United States at the 2022 IIHF World U18 Championships, where he recorded three wins and one loss, with a 2.77 GAA and won a silver medal. He again represented the United States at the 2023 IIHF World U18 Championships, where he recorded six wins, with a 1.61 GAA, .934 save percentage, and won a gold medal.

On December 12, 2022, Augustine was named to the United States men's national junior ice hockey team to compete at the 2023 World Junior Ice Hockey Championships. During the tournament he recorded four wins and one loss, with a 2.85 GAA, .890 save percentage and won a bronze medal.

On December 16, 2023, he was named to Team USA's roster to compete at the 2024 World Junior Ice Hockey Championships. During the tournament he won all four games he started, and posted a tournament-best 1.75 GAA and .936 save percentage. During the gold medal game against Sweden he posted 24 saves in a 6–2 victory, and won a gold medal.

On May 5, 2024, he was named to the United States men's national ice hockey team to compete at the 2024 IIHF World Championship. He made his senior national team debut when he came on in relief for Alex Lyon in a game against Germany on May 11, 2024, and allowed one goal on 12 shots. He became the nineteenth teenage goaltender to compete at the Ice Hockey World Championships. During the tournament he appeared in three games with one win and one loss, a 1.37 GAA and a .929 save percentage.

On December 21, 2024, he was again named to Team USA's roster to compete at the 2025 World Junior Ice Hockey Championships. With a win against Czechia in the semifinals, Augustine became the winningest goaltender in team USA history at the IIHF World Junior Championship with 11 wins, surpassing the previous record of ten wins held by Jack Campbell. He finished the tournament with four wins and one loss, a 2.52 GAA and won a gold medal. He helped team USA win back-to-back gold medals at the IIHF World Junior Championship for the first time in history.

== Personal life ==
Augustine was born to Kenneth and Yvette Augustine. His mother played college basketball at Drake. He has three siblings, Sydney, Jamie, and Jessie.

== Career statistics ==
=== Regular season and playoffs ===
			Regular season									Playoffs
Season	Team	League	GP	W	L	OTL	MIN	GA	SO	GAA	SV%	GP	W	L	MIN	GA	SO	GAA	SV%
2021–22	U.S. National Development Team	USHL	16	6	6	1	808	49	1	3.64	.891	—	—	—	—	—	—	—	—
2022–23	U.S. National Development Team	USHL	14	10	1	2	719	28	1	2.34	.928	—	—	—	—	—	—	—	—
2023–24	Michigan State University	B1G	35	23	9	2	2,087	103	3	2.96	.915	—	—	—	—	—	—	—	—
2024–25	Michigan State University	B1G	30	19	7	4	1,850	64	3	2.08	.924	—	—	—	—	—	—	—	—
2025–26	Michigan State University	B1G	34	24	9	1	2,048	72	3	2.11	.929	—	—	—	—	—	—	—	—
2025–26	Grand Rapids Griffins	AHL	2	0	2	0	89	5	0	3.39	.878	—	—	—	—	—	—	—	—
AHL totals			2	0	2	0	89	5	0	3.39	.878	—	—	—	—	—	—	—	—

=== International ===
Year	Team	Event	Result	GP	W	L	T	MIN	GA	SO	GAA	SV%
2022	United States	U18	2nd place, silver medalist(s)	4	3	1	0	238	11	0	2.77	.882
2023	United States	U18	1st place, gold medalist(s)	6	6	0	0	335	9	0	1.61	.934
2023	United States	WJC	3rd place, bronze medalist(s)	6	4	1	0	316	15	0	2.85	.891
2024	United States	WJC	1st place, gold medalist(s)	4	4	0	0	240	7	0	1.75	.936
2024	United States	WC	5th	3	1	1	0	131	3	0	1.37	.929
2025	United States	WJC	1st place, gold medalist(s)	5	4	1	0	310	13	0	2.52	.917
Junior totals				25	21	3	0	1,439	55	0	2.28	.913
Senior totals				3	1	1	0	131	3	0	1.37	.929

== Awards and honors ==
Award	Year
College
All-Big Ten Second Team	2024
Big Ten Freshman Team	2024
Big Ten All-Tournament Team	2024, 2025
Big Ten Tournament MVP	2024
Big Ten Goaltender of the Year	2025, 2026
All-Big Ten First Team	2025, 2026
AHCA West First Team All-American	2025, 2026
Mike Richter Award	2026

Awards and achievements
Preceded by Adam Fantilli	Big Ten Tournament MOP; 2024	Succeeded by Isaac Howard
Preceded by Kyle McClellan	Big Ten Goaltender of the Year; 2024–25, 2025–26	Succeeded by Incumbent
Preceded by Jacob Fowler	Mike Richter Award; 2025–26	Succeeded by Incumbent
