= Vasili Ponomaryov =

Russian ice hockey player (born 2002)

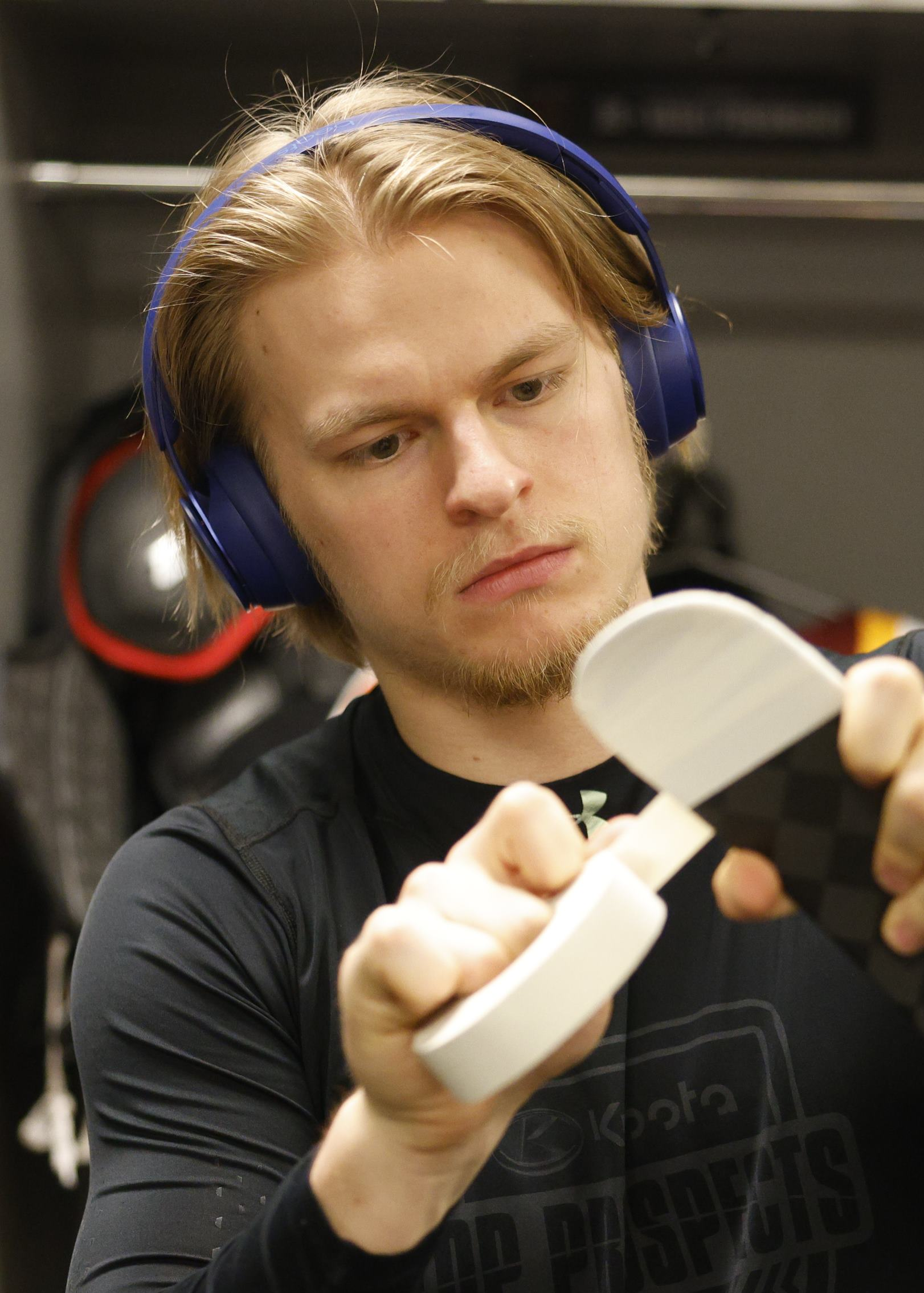
- Born: 13 March 2002 (age 24) Moscow, Russia
- Height: 5 ft 10 in (178 cm)
- Weight: 180 lb (82 kg; 12 st 12 lb)
- Position: Centre
- Shoots: Left
- KHL team Former teams: Avangard Omsk; Spartak Moscow; Carolina Hurricanes; Pittsburgh Penguins
- NHL draft: 53rd overall, 2020; Carolina Hurricanes
- Playing career: 2021–present

Vasili Pavlovich Ponomaryov (alternately spelled Vasily Ponomarev, Russian: Василий Павлович Пономарёв; born 13 March 2002) is a Russian professional ice hockey player for Avangard Omsk in the Kontinental Hockey League (KHL). He previously played in the National Hockey League (NHL) for the Carolina Hurricanes and the Pittsburgh Penguins.

== Playing career ==
Ponomaryov was drafted ninth overall by the Shawinigan Cataractes in the 2019 CHL Import Draft. During his rookie season in 2019–20, he recorded 18 goals and 31 assists in 57 games for the Cataractes. During the 2020–21 season, he recorded 10 goals and 28 assists in 33 games.

Ponomaryov was drafted in the second round, 53rd overall, by the Carolina Hurricanes in the 2020 NHL entry draft. On 13 October 2020, the Hurricanes signed Ponomaryov to a three-year, entry-level contract.

On 9 June 2021, the Hurricanes loaned Ponomarev to the HC Spartak Moscow of the KHL. He made his professional debut for Spartak during the 2021–22 season.

In April 2022, he was assigned to the Chicago Wolves, and would go on to win the 2022 Calder Cup.

On 5 January 2024, Ponomaryov made his NHL debut for the Hurricanes, recording one goal and one assist in their 6–2 win over the Washington Capitals.

On 7 March 2024, Ponomaryov was traded to the Pittsburgh Penguins, along with Michael Bunting, Ville Koivunen, prospect Cruz Lucius, and two conditional 2024 draft picks, in exchange for Jake Guentzel and Ty Smith.

On 11 June 2025, Ponomarev as a pending restricted free agent signed a three-year contract to return to the KHL with Avangard Omsk.

== International play ==
Ponomaryov represented Russia at the 2017 World U-17 Hockey Challenge where he led the team in scoring with four goals and four assists in six games and won a gold medal. In 2019 he represented Russia at the 2019 Hlinka Gretzky Cup where he recorded two goals and three assists in five games and won a gold medal and the 2019 World Junior A Challenge where he recorded one goal and three assists in six games and won a gold medal.

He represented Russia at the 2021 World Junior Championships where he led the team in scoring with three goals in seven games. He also played at the 2022 World Juniors, where he played two games before the tournament was cancelled.

== Career statistics ==
=== Regular season and playoffs ===
| | | | Regular season | | | | | Playoffs |
| Season | Team | League | GP | G | A | Pts | PIM | GP | G | A | Pts | PIM |
|---|---|---|---|---|---|---|---|---|---|---|---|---|
| 2018–19 | MHC Krylya Sovetov | MHL | 37 | 9 | 20 | 29 | 12 | — | — | — | — | — |
| 2019–20 | Shawinigan Cataractes | QMJHL | 57 | 18 | 31 | 49 | 15 | — | — | — | — | — |
| 2020–21 | Shawinigan Cataractes | QMJHL | 33 | 10 | 28 | 38 | 16 | 5 | 3 | 1 | 4 | 2 |
| 2021–22 | Spartak Moscow | KHL | 14 | 1 | 1 | 2 | 0 | — | — | — | — | — |
| 2021–22 | Khimik Voskresensk | VHL | 21 | 7 | 6 | 13 | 8 | 6 | 1 | 1 | 2 | 2 |
| 2021–22 | MHK Spartak | MHL | 4 | 2 | 7 | 9 | 4 | 3 | 1 | 2 | 3 | 0 |
| 2021–22 | Chicago Wolves | AHL | 11 | 3 | 7 | 10 | 4 | 18 | 1 | 5 | 6 | 4 |
| 2022–23 | Chicago Wolves | AHL | 64 | 24 | 22 | 46 | 32 | — | — | — | — | — |
| 2023–24 | Tucson Roadrunners | AHL | 2 | 0 | 0 | 0 | 0 | — | — | — | — | — |
| 2023–24 | Chicago Wolves | AHL | 39 | 8 | 21 | 29 | 14 | — | — | — | — | — |
| 2023–24 | Carolina Hurricanes | NHL | 2 | 1 | 1 | 2 | 0 | — | — | — | — | — |
| 2023–24 | Wilkes-Barre/Scranton Penguins | AHL | 4 | 1 | 0 | 1 | 2 | — | — | — | — | — |
| 2024–25 | Wilkes-Barre/Scranton Penguins | AHL | 55 | 15 | 26 | 41 | 44 | 2 | 0 | 0 | 0 | 0 |
| 2024–25 | Pittsburgh Penguins | NHL | 7 | 0 | 0 | 0 | 2 | — | — | — | — | — |
| 2025–26 | Avangard Omsk | KHL | 55 | 14 | 11 | 25 | 41 | 17 | 5 | 1 | 6 | 2 |
| KHL totals | | | 69 | 15 | 12 | 27 | 41 | 17 | 5 | 1 | 6 | 2 |
| NHL totals | | | 9 | 1 | 1 | 2 | 2 | — | — | — | — | — |

=== International ===
| Year | Team | Event | Result | GP | G | A | Pts | PIM |
|---|---|---|---|---|---|---|---|---|
| 2017 | Russia | U17 | 5th | 6 | 4 | 4 | 8 | 2 |
| 2019 | Russia | HG18 | 1st place, gold medalist(s) | 5 | 2 | 3 | 5 | 2 |
| 2019 | Russia | WJAC | 1st place, gold medalist(s) | 6 | 1 | 3 | 4 | 0 |
| 2021 | Russia | WJC | 4th | 7 | 3 | 0 | 3 | 0 |
| Junior totals | | | | 24 | 10 | 10 | 20 | 4 |

== Awards and honours ==
| Award | Year | Ref |
AHL
| Calder Cup champion | 2022 | |
