= Yegor Spiridonov =

Russian ice hockey player

- Born: 22 January 2001 (age 25) Magnitogorsk, Russia
- Height: 6 ft 2 in (188 cm)
- Weight: 192 lb (87 kg; 13 st 10 lb)
- Position: Centre/Left wing
- Shoots: Right
- VHL team Former teams: HC Yugra; SKA Saint Petersburg; Sibir Novosibirsk; HC Sochi
- NHL draft: 108th overall, 2019; San Jose Sharks
- Playing career: 2020–present

Yegor Romanovich Spiridonov (Russian: Егор Романович Спиридонов; born 22 January 2001) is a Russian ice hockey forward who plays for HC Yugra in the Supreme Hockey League (VHL).

== Playing career ==
Spiridonov made his KHL debut for SKA Saint Petersburg during the 2020–21 KHL season. He was drafted by the San Jose Sharks in the fourth round of the 2019 NHL entry draft with the 108th pick overall.

== Career statistics ==
=== Regular season and playoffs ===
			Regular season					Playoffs
Season	Team	League	GP	G	A	Pts	PIM	GP	G	A	Pts	PIM
2017–18	Stalnye Lisy	MHL	39	10	9	19	16	4	1	0	1	2
2018–19	Stalnye Lisy	MHL	43	15	26	41	28	3	2	1	3	2
2019–20	Zauralie Kurgan	VHL	18	1	2	3	10	—	—	—	—	—
2019–20	Stalnye Lisy	MHL	26	9	13	22	16	5	1	1	2	0
2020–21	SKA-1946	MHL	7	2	4	6	6	—	—	—	—	—
2020–21	SKA Saint Petersburg	KHL	2	0	0	0	0	—	—	—	—	—
2020–21	SKA-Neva	VHL	10	4	1	5	0	—	—	—	—	—
2021–22	Sibir Novosibirsk	KHL	3	0	0	0	2	—	—	—	—	—
2021–22	Yuzhny Ural Orsk	VHL	23	1	2	3	4	—	—	—	—	—
2022–23	Sibir Novosibirsk	KHL	24	1	1	2	8	—	—	—	—	—
2023–24	Sibir Novosibirsk	KHL	23	1	0	1	2	—	—	—	—	—
2023–24	Metallurg Novokuznetsk	VHL	3	0	0	0	2	—	—	—	—	—
2023–24	HC Sochi	KHL	9	0	0	0	6	—	—	—	—	—
2024–25	HC Sochi	KHL	24	0	0	0	10	—	—	—	—	—
KHL totals			85	2	1	3	28	—	—	—	—	—

Medal record

Representing Russia

Ice hockey

World U18 Championships
Silver medal – second place	2019 Sweden	

=== International ===
Year	Team	Event	Result	GP	G	A	Pts	PIM
2019	Russia	U18	2nd place, silver medalist(s)	7	2	4	6	8
2021	Russia	WJC	4th	7	0	0	0	4
Junior totals				14	2	4	6	12
