= Devon Levi =

Canadian ice hockey player (born 2001)

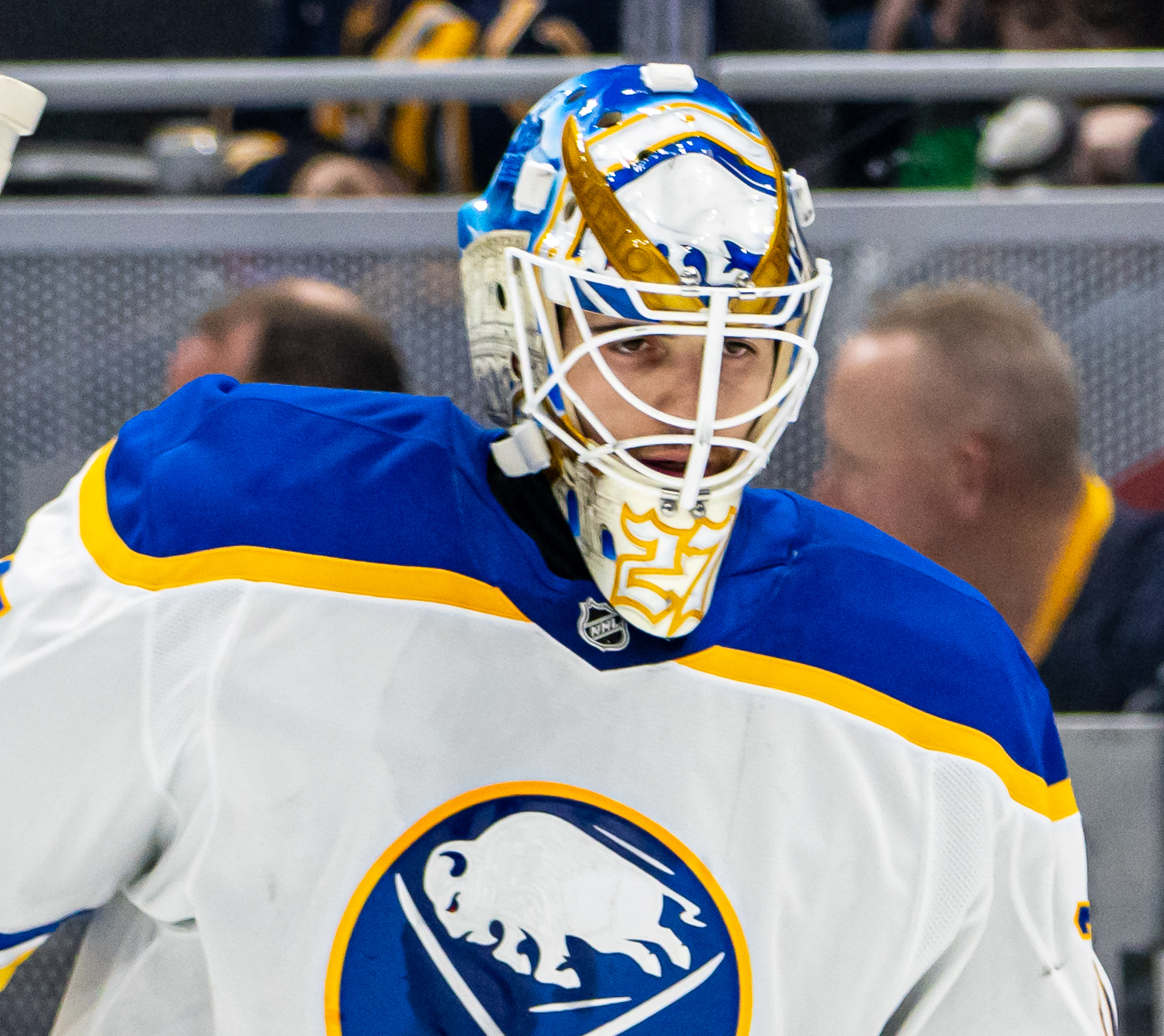
- Levi with the Buffalo Sabres in 2025
- Born: December 27, 2001 (age 24) Dollard-des-Ormeaux, Quebec, Canada
- Height: 6 ft 0 in (183 cm)
- Weight: 187 lb (85 kg; 13 st 5 lb)
- Position: Goaltender
- Catches: Left
- NHL team Former teams: Edmonton Oilers; Buffalo Sabres
- National team: Canada
- NHL draft: 212th overall, 2020; Florida Panthers
- Playing career: 2023–present

Devon Levi (born December 27, 2001) is a Canadian professional ice hockey player who is a goaltender for the Edmonton Oilers of the National Hockey League (NHL). He previously played in the NHL for the Buffalo Sabres.

Levi was awarded the Most Valuable Player at the 2019 World Junior A Challenge. He was then the 2019–20 Canadian Junior Hockey League (CJHL) MVP and Top Goalie, and the 2019–20 Central Canada Hockey League (CCHL) MVP and Top Goaltender. He was drafted 212th overall by the Florida Panthers in the seventh round of the 2020 NHL entry draft, and in 2021 his rights were traded to the Buffalo Sabres.

He played for the Canadian national junior ice hockey team at the 2021 World Junior Ice Hockey Championships. The team won the silver medal, and Levi ended the tournament with a .964 save percentage (SV%) (topping the all-time record established by Carey Price in 2007). He was named the Best Goaltender of the tournament, and to the tournament All Star Team. He was named to Team Canada in the 2022 Winter Olympics.

== Early life ==
Levi is from Dollard-des-Ormeaux, Quebec, a Montreal suburb. His father Laurent Levi is a software engineer, and his mother Eta Yacowar is an office administrator at the software company they are building. He has a younger brother, James. He has been friends with fellow goalie Yaniv Perets since childhood, and the two played on the same youth teams for several years. While Levi's first language is English, he also speaks French.

Levi, who is Jewish, attended Hebrew Foundation School. He then attended West Island College (2019), where he was a valedictorian. He took online courses from Athabasca University.

== Playing career ==
Levi began by playing street hockey with his father, and until he was 11 years old, his only experience in goal was on concrete.

He is noted by media for his speed and technique. He is also noted by coaches for his ability to read the players and the game in front of him, and track the puck through traffic. During every timeout, he drops to his knees 15 feet in front of his net, bows his head, and uses breathing techniques to reset.

=== Quebec Midget AAA Hockey League ===
Levi played youth hockey for the Lac St-Louis Lions of the under-18 Quebec Midget AAA Hockey League in the Quebec Junior Hockey League (QMAAA) in 2016–19, beginning as their youngest player in his first season at 14 years of age. In 2018 he won the Montreal Amateur Athletic Association (MAAA) Governor's Award for Student Athlete of the Year, and the Daniel Brière Award for Best Hockey and Academic Achievement. In 2018 and 2019 he was chosen for the MAAA First All Star Team, and he was a two-time recipient of the Federation of Athletic Excellence of Quebec (FAEQ)/Montreal Canadiens' Foundation Award and Scholarship for Athletic and Academic Excellence (bursaries of $1,500).

In 2019, he set the record for most saves ever in a 60-minute Quebec Midget AA game, in a game in which he made 64 saves on 65 shots. In 2019 he also received the MAAA Ken Dryden Trophy as Best Goalie Prospect in the League, and was awarded the Patrick Roy Trophy as the best defensive player in the playoffs. He holds the league record for career shutouts, with eight.

=== Central Canada Hockey League ===
Levi began his junior career in the Ottawa, Ontario, area with the Carleton Place Canadians in the Central Canada Hockey League (CCHL), a Junior A league, during the 2019–20 season. For the season, he had a .941 save percentage (SV%), and a 1.47 goals against average (GAA), with 8 shutouts (in 37 games), all leading the league.

He was named the 2019–20 Canadian Junior Hockey League (CJHL) Player of the Year, CJHL MVP, CJHL Top Rookie, and CJL Top Goalie. He was also named the 2019–20 CCHL MVP, CCHL Top Goaltender, CCHL Rookie of the Year, CCHL Top Prospect, and a CCHL First Team All Star. Canadians' head coach Jason Clarke said: "If there is anyone who is going to take the NCAA by storm next year and really do some special things, I’d bet my mortgage on Devon Levi."

=== Draft and college ===
He was drafted 212th overall by the Florida Panthers in the 7th round of the 2020 NHL entry draft. On July 24, 2021, Levi's NHL rights, along with a 2022 first-round pick (Jiří Kulich), were traded by the Panthers to the Buffalo Sabres in exchange for Sam Reinhart.

Levi committed to play in Boston for the NCAA Division I Northeastern University's Huskies men's ice hockey team, starting in the 2020–21 season. However, Levi did not begin his college career until the following season, due to his lingering rib injury. Levi majored in computer science at Northeastern, where he attended on scholarship. He was named to the Hockey East All-Academic Team for 2020–21.

He began his NCAA career in the 2021–22 season after missing the 2020–21 season with a rib injury suffered in the 2021 World Junior Ice Hockey Championships. He began his career with Northeastern by putting up back-to-back shutouts. In both October and November 2021, Levi was named Hockey East Pro Ambitions Rookie of the Month. By mid-season, he had set the Northeastern record for shutouts in a season. Levi finished the 2021–22 season with a .952 SV%, tying Connor Hellebuyck for the second best single season save percentage in NCAA history. Levi won the Mike Richter Award as the top college goaltender and led Northeastern to the Hockey East regular season title.

In the 2022–23 season, Levi led Northeastern to a victory in the Beanpot tournament. Levi won both the tournament MVP and the Eberly award for having the best save percentage after stopping 63 of 66 shots. Levi once again led the country in save percentage during the regular season and won the Mike Richter award for a second consecutive season, becoming the first player to accomplish this feat. Levi's college career ended with a loss to Providence in the Hockey East playoffs, and he finished his NCAA Career with the second best career SV% in NCAA history.

=== Professional career ===
==== Buffalo Sabres ====
Six days after his college career ended, Levi signed his entry-level contract with the Buffalo Sabres. Levi joined a crowded goaltender room, joining Ukko-Pekka Luukkonen, Craig Anderson, and Eric Comrie on the NHL roster. Levi made his Sabres debut on March 31, in an overtime win against the New York Rangers. Levi would play 7 of the Sabres' final 9 games, amassing 5 wins.

Levi began the 2023–24 season on the Sabres NHL roster with Luukkonen and Comrie. Levi started the first 4 games for the Sabres, going 1–3–0 with a 3.26 GAA and a .892 save percentage, before suffering a lower body injury and missing over two weeks. Levi performed well in his first two games after the injury, but struggled in a game against the Boston Bruins, allowing 5 goals in 18 shots before being pulled. Levi would play one more game and won against the Washington Capitals, but with Luukkonen and Comrie both playing well, Levi was reassigned the Rochester Americans in order to get him more games. After two games with the Americans, Levi was recalled due to Luukkonen suffering an illness. However, upon Luukkonen's return, Luukkonen emerged as the Sabres clear top goaltender, and Levi was loaned to Rochester again in order to allow him to play more games. Levi was recalled again ahead of the Sabres' west coast road trip, and played in one game before being loaned to Rochester after the trip. Levi would remain with the Americans throughout the month of February, and scored his first professional point on March 1, with an assist on Aleksandr Kisakov's game-winning goal.

==== Edmonton Oilers ====
On July 1, 2026, Levi, along with a seventh-round pick in the 2028 NHL entry draft, was traded by the Sabres to the Edmonton Oilers in exchange for a third-round pick in the 2028 NHL entry draft. Initially serving as a third-string goaltender behind newly-acquired Frederik Andersen and Tristan Jarry, Levi moved up the rotation following an off-season injury to Andersen. On October 13, 2026, he became the first goaltender in franchise history to win in his first four starts, making 39 saves in a 4–1 victory against the Los Angeles Kings. Levi recorded his first career shutout on November 14, 2026, making 19 saves in a 1–0 victory against the Toronto Maple Leafs. After the game, actor Russell Crowe gave Levi a shoutout online after seeing that Levi's tradition of pressing his bare palm to the surface of the ice was inspired by a similar move done by Crowe's character in Gladiator. On November 17, 2026, Levi set a franchise record for fewest games played to reach 10 wins with 11, after making 20 saves in a 5–2 victory against the Florida Panthers.

== International play ==
Medal record

Representing Canada

Ice hockey

World Championships
Gold medal – first place	2023 Finland/Latvia	

World Junior Championships
Silver medal – second place	2021 Canada	

Levi first attracted the attention of Hockey Canada through his stellar performance at the 2019 World Junior A Challenge, an under-20 tournament. He stopped 77 of 80 shots, led Canada East to a silver medal, and was named tournament MVP.

He gained more widespread recognition during the 2021 World Junior Ice Hockey Championships due to his outstanding play for the Canada men's national junior ice hockey team, helping them win the silver medal. Levi ended the tournament with a .964 SV% (topping the all-time record established by Carey Price in 2007) and a 0.75 GAA, both being the best in the tournament. He became the second goaltender ever to record three shutouts in the tournament. He was named the Best Goaltender of the tournament by the IIHF Directorate, and named to the tournament All-Star Team. After the World Juniors, Levi revealed that he had played the entire tournament with a fractured rib, after sustaining the injury against the German team in the opening game.

He was named to Team Canada in the 2022 Winter Olympics. Levi did not feature in any games in the 2022 Olympics, as Canada chose to play Matt Tomkins and Edward Pasquale.

== Career statistics ==
=== Regular season and playoffs ===
			Regular season									Playoffs
Season	Team	League	GP	W	L	OTL	MIN	GA	SO	GAA	SV%	GP	W	L	MIN	GA	SO	GAA	SV%
2016–17	Lac St-Louis Lions	QMAAA	23	11	10	0	—	—	5	2.69	.925	4	1	3	—	—	0	3.53	.877
2017–18	Lac St-Louis Lions	QMAAA	26	14	11	0	—	—	1	2.98	.927	5	2	3	—	—	0	2.12	.942
2018–19	Lac St-Louis Lions	QMAAA	28	14	13	0	—	—	2	3.10	.909	16	9	7	—	—	2	2.49	.937
2019–20	Carleton Place Canadians	CCHL	37	34	2	1	2209	54	8	1.47	.941	—	—	—	—	—	—	—	—
2021–22	Northeastern University	HE	32	21	10	1	1875	48	10	1.54	.952	—	—	—	—	—	—	—	—
2022–23	Northeastern University	HE	34	17	12	5	2,065	77	6	2.24	.933	—	—	—	—	—	—	—	—
2022–23	Buffalo Sabres	NHL	7	5	2	0	430	21	0	2.94	.905	—	—	—	—	—	—	—	—
2023–24	Buffalo Sabres	NHL	23	10	8	2	1,295	67	0	3.10	.899	—	—	—	—	—	—	—	—
2023–24	Rochester Americans	AHL	26	16	6	4	1,561	63	0	2.42	.927	5	2	3	350	15	0	2.57	.923
2024–25	Buffalo Sabres	NHL	9	2	7	0	481	33	0	4.12	.872	—	—	—	—	—	—	—	—
2024–25	Rochester Americans	AHL	42	25	13	4	2,510	92	7	2.20	.919	8	5	3	477	20	2	2.52	.910
2025–26	Rochester Americans	AHL	52	23	20	9	3,029	143	3	2.83	.904	3	1	2	177	8	1	2.71	.919
NHL totals			39	17	17	2	2,205	121	0	3.29	.894	—	—	—	—	—	—	—	—

=== International ===
Year	Team	Event	Result	GP	W	L	OT	MIN	GA	SO	GAA	SV%
2021	Canada	WJC	2nd place, silver medalist(s)	7	6	1	0	398	5	3	0.75	.964
2023	Canada	WC	1st place, gold medalist(s)	1	1	0	0	60	2	0	2.00	.917
Junior totals				7	6	1	0	398	5	3	0.75	.964
Senior totals				1	1	0	0	60	2	0	2.00	.917

== Awards and honours ==
Award	Year
Hockey East All-Rookie Team	2021–22
All-Hockey East First Team	2021–22
AHCA East First Team All-American	2021–22
Mike Richter Award	2021–22, 2022–23

== See also ==
- List of select Jewish ice hockey players

Awards and achievements
Preceded by Bobby Trivigno	Hockey East Player of the Year; 2022–23	Succeeded by Macklin Celebrini
Preceded by Aidan McDonough / Marc McLaughlin / Jonny Evans	Hockey East Three-Stars Award; 2021–22	Succeeded by Lane Hutson
Preceded by Devon Levi	Hockey East Goaltending Champion; 2022–23	Succeeded by Jacob Fowler
Preceded by Josh Lopina / Nikita Nesterenko	Hockey East Rookie of the Year; 2021–22	Succeeded by Lane Hutson
Preceded by Thomas Bordeleau	Tim Taylor Award; 2021–22	Succeeded by Adam Fantilli
Preceded by Jack LaFontaine	Mike Richter Award; 2021–22, 2022–23	Succeeded by Kyle McClellan
