= Mike Richter Award =

American collegiate ice hockey goaltending award

- Sport: Ice hockey
- Awarded for: To the most outstanding goaltender in NCAA men's ice hockey.

History
- First award: 2014
- First winner: Connor Hellebuyck (UMass Lowell)
- Most recent: Trey Augustine (Michigan State)

The Mike Richter Award is an annual award given to the goaltender voted to be the most outstanding in Division I NCAA men's ice hockey during the regular season. The award is named in honor of former Wisconsin goaltender Mike Richter.

The inaugural winner was announced at the 2014 Frozen Four tournament held April 10–12, 2014 in Philadelphia.

As of 2025, Devon Levi is the only goaltender to win the award multiple times, as well as in consecutive years.

== Award winners ==
Year	Winner	School	Ref
2013–14	Connor Hellebuyck	UMass Lowell	
2014–15	Zane McIntyre	North Dakota	
2015–16	Thatcher Demko	Boston College	
2016–17	Tanner Jaillet	Denver	
2017–18	Cale Morris	Notre Dame	
2018–19	Cayden Primeau	Northeastern	
2019–20	Jeremy Swayman	Maine	
2020–21	Jack LaFontaine	Minnesota	
2021–22	Devon Levi	Northeastern	
2022–23	Devon Levi	Northeastern	
2023–24	Kyle McClellan	Wisconsin	
2024–25	Jacob Fowler	Boston College	
2025–26	Trey Augustine	Michigan State	

=== Winners by school ===
School	Winners
Northeastern	3
Boston College	2
Denver	1
Maine	1
Michigan State	1
Minnesota	1
North Dakota	1
Notre Dame	1
UMass Lowell	1
Wisconsin	1
