= Ovintiv Events Centre =

Arena in Dawson Creek, British Columbia

- Interactive map of Ovintiv Events Centre
- Former names: Encana Events Centre (2008–2021)
- Location: Dawson Creek, British Columbia
- Coordinates: 55.739578°N 120.209624°W
- Operator: Oak View Group
- Capacity: 6,500 (concerts); 4,500 (ice hockey)
- Surface: Ice (200' x 85')

Tenant
- Dawson Creek Rage (NAHL) (2010–2012)

The Ovintiv Events Centre (formerly named Encana Events Centre to June 2021), is a multipurpose arena located in Dawson Creek, British Columbia. The name change came about due to a reorganization of the former Encana Corporation, where the organization adopted the new name "Ovintiv Inc." The facility has 4,500 permanent seats and can seat up to 6,500 for concerts.
