= Alex Laferriere =

American ice hockey player (born 2001)

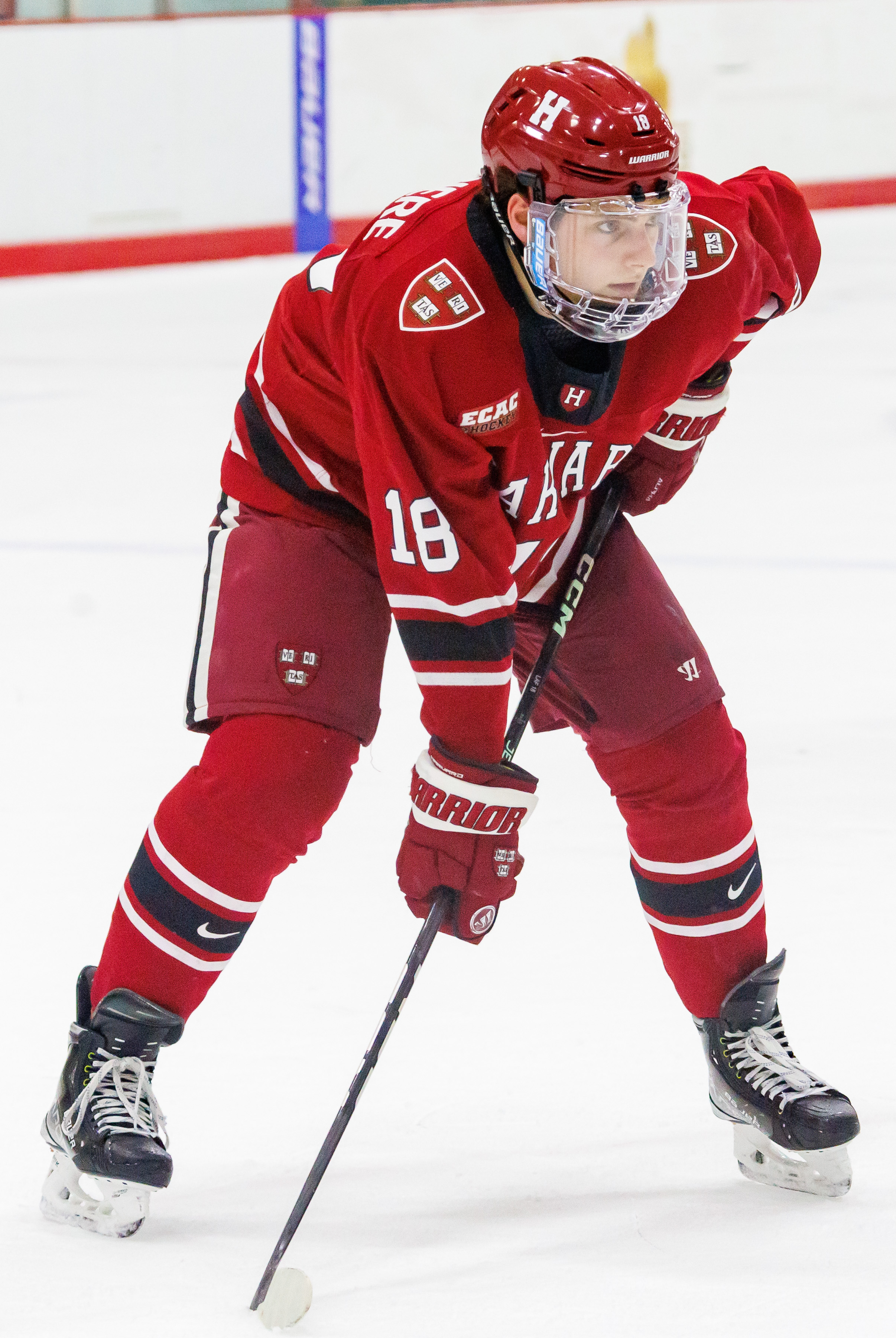
- Laferriere with Harvard in 2023
- Born: October 28, 2001 (age 24) Chatham, New Jersey, U.S.
- Height: 6 ft 1 in (185 cm)
- Weight: 205 lb (93 kg; 14 st 9 lb)
- Position: Right wing
- Shoots: Right
- NHL team: Los Angeles Kings
- NHL draft: 83rd overall, 2020; Los Angeles Kings
- Playing career: 2023–present

Alex Laferriere (born October 28, 2001) is an American professional ice hockey player who is a right winger for the Los Angeles Kings of the National Hockey League (NHL).

== Playing career ==
Laferriere was often passed over for spots on top youth ice hockey teams due to his size; he stood at only 5 ft 2 in (157 cm) by his freshman year of high school, but had a growth spurt when he was around age 16. He played youth ice hockey for the New Jersey Colonials and North Jersey Avalanche. He attended Chatham High School in his hometown, later spent time with the University of Nebraska High School and then spent a year at Kent School in Connecticut, averaging close to two points per game in the 2018–19 season. Laferriere was the second-leading player in the New England area in points per game at Kent and finished the season with 19 goals and 34 assists in 27 games.

Laferriere initially committed to play in college for the Army Black Knights, but later switched to the Harvard Crimson. He also joined the Des Moines Buccaneers of the United States Hockey League (USHL) for the end of the 2018–19 season, appearing in 12 games. In 2019–20, he played 42 games for the Buccaneers and led them in scoring with 45 points, also tying for the team lead in goals (19) and assists (26). He was named the team's most valuable player and was invited to the BioSteel All-American Game. Following the season, Laferriere was selected in the third round with the 83rd overall pick of the 2020 NHL entry draft by the Los Angeles Kings. He then played 49 games in the 2020–21 season with Des Moines, totaling 50 points on 26 goals and 24 assists.

Laferriere began playing in college with Harvard starting in 2021–22, posting in his first season 31 points (14 goals, 17 assists) in 35 games, being named the ECAC Hockey Rookie of the Year, to the ECAC Hockey All-Rookie team and third-team All-ECAC Hockey. He then played 34 games in 2022–23 and helped Harvard reach the NCAA tournament with 21 goals and 21 assists. He was selected second-team All-ECAC Hockey for his performance. Laferriere then turned professional and played four games with the Ontario Reign of the American Hockey League (AHL), scoring one goal.

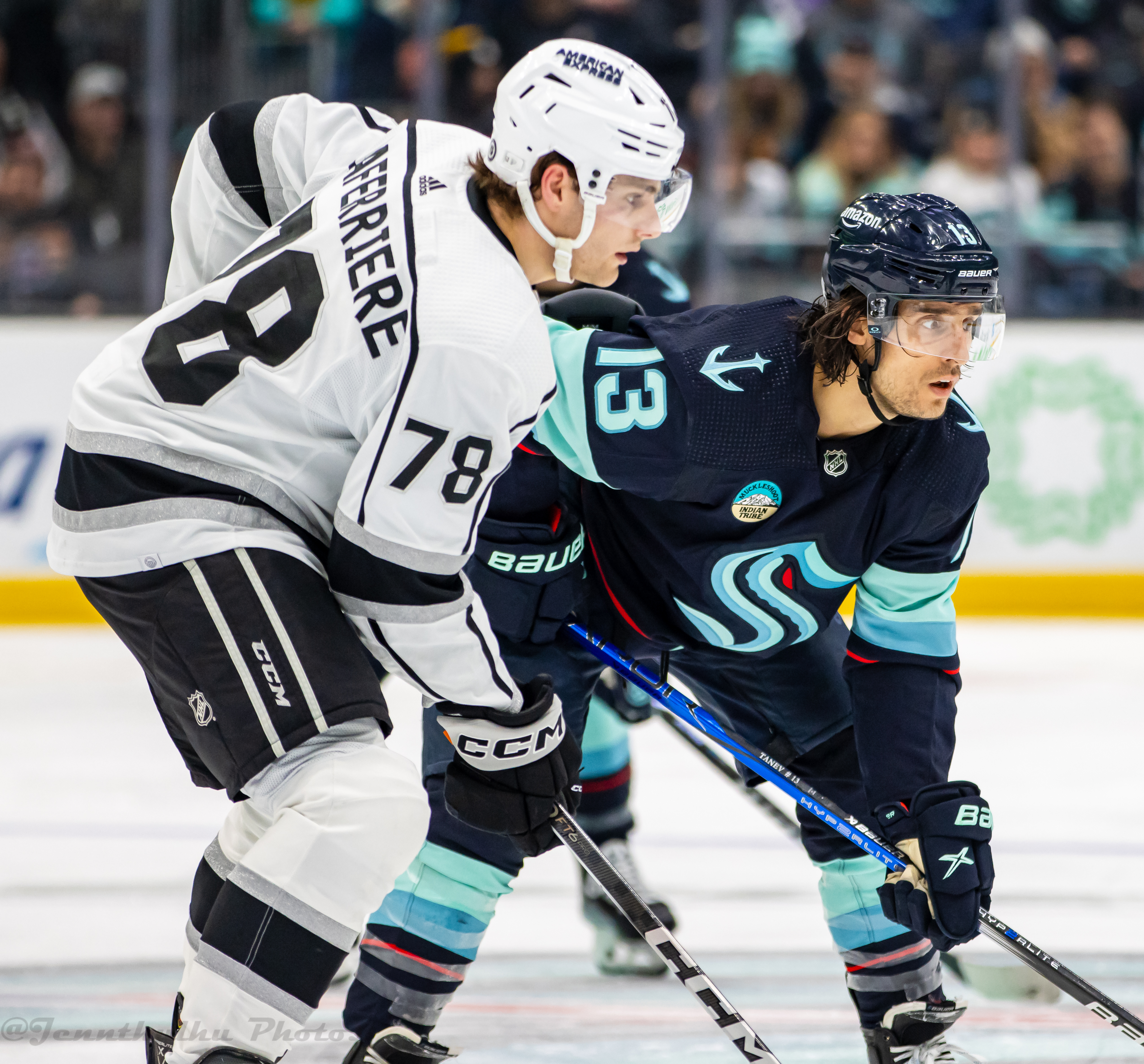
Laferriere lining up against Brandon Tanev of the Seattle Kraken in 2023.

Following his first AHL game, Laferriere signed a three-year, entry-level contract with the Los Angeles Kings on April 9, 2023. He was assigned to the AHL to begin the 2023–24 season, but was recalled on October 9, later making his NHL debut in the Kings' season-opening game on October 11, against the Colorado Avalanche, while having four shots on goal in a 5–2 loss. Laferriere scored his first NHL goal in a 4–2 loss against the Boston Bruins on October 21.

On August 2, 2025, Laferriere signed a three-year, $12.3 million contract extension with the Kings.

== International play ==
Laferriere played six games for the United States at the 2019 World Junior A Challenge.

== Personal life ==
Laferriere was born on October 28, 2001, in Chatham, New Jersey. His father, Rob, played ice hockey in college for the Princeton Tigers and Boston College Eagles. He initially disliked the idea of skating; at a young age, he was offered skating lessons by his mother but refused until his sister promised him Skittles. Laferriere said that the incident helped spark his interest in ice hockey.

== Career statistics ==
=== Regular season and playoffs ===
			Regular season					Playoffs
Season	Team	League	GP	G	A	Pts	PIM	GP	G	A	Pts	PIM
2018–19	Des Moines Buccaneers	USHL	12	0	0	0	0	—	—	—	—	—
2019–20	Des Moines Buccaneers	USHL	42	19	26	45	42	—	—	—	—	—
2020–21	Des Moines Buccaneers	USHL	49	26	24	50	59	—	—	—	—	—
2021–22	Harvard University	ECAC	35	14	17	31	12	—	—	—	—	—
2022–23	Harvard University	ECAC	34	21	21	42	20	—	—	—	—	—
2022–23	Ontario Reign	AHL	4	1	0	1	0	—	—	—	—	—
2023–24	Los Angeles Kings	NHL	81	12	11	23	46	5	1	1	2	0
2024–25	Los Angeles Kings	NHL	77	19	23	42	20	6	0	3	3	2
2025–26	Los Angeles Kings	NHL	82	21	23	44	18	4	0	4	4	0
NHL totals			240	52	57	109	84	15	1	8	9	2

=== International ===
Year	Team	Event	Result	GP	G	A	Pts	PIM
2019	United States	WJAC	3rd place, bronze medalist(s)	6	0	0	0	2
Junior totals				6	0	0	0	2
