= Hunter Skinner =

American ice hockey player (born 2001)

- Born: April 29, 2001 (age 25) Wyandotte, Michigan, United States
- Height: 6 ft 3 in (191 cm)
- Weight: 195 lb (88 kg; 13 st 13 lb)
- Position: Defense
- Shoots: Right
- NHL team (P) Cur. team Former teams: Nashville Predators; Milwaukee Admirals (AHL); St. Louis Blues
- NHL draft: 112th overall, 2019; New York Rangers
- Playing career: 2020–present

Hunter Skinner (born April 29, 2001) is an American professional ice hockey player who is a defenseman for the Milwaukee Admirals of the American Hockey League (AHL) while under contract to the Nashville Predators of the National Hockey League (NHL). Skinner was drafted as the 112th overall pick in the 4th round of the 2019 NHL entry draft by the New York Rangers.

== Playing career ==
Skinner played junior hockey with the Muskegon Lumberjacks and Lincoln Stars in the United States Hockey League (USHL), and was selected by the New York Rangers in the fourth-round, 112th overall, of the 2019 NHL entry draft, before moving to the Canadian major junior system with the London Knights of the Ontario Hockey League (OHL) for the 2019–20 season.

After initially making his professional debut with the Utah Grizzlies of the ECHL, Skinner was signed during the 2020–21 season to a three-year, entry-level contract with the New York Rangers on March 29, 2021.

On February 9, 2023, Skinner was traded by the Rangers to the St. Louis Blues alongside left-winger Sammy Blais, a 2023 first-round conditional pick, and a 2024 fourth-round pick for right-winger Vladimir Tarasenko and defenseman Niko Mikkola.

After playing for Springfield for several seasons, he was promoted to the Blues in November 2025. He made his NHL debut for the Blues on November 14, 2025 and was sent back to Sprinfield on November 21.

After concluding his fourth season within the Blues organization, Skinner as a free agent was signed to a one-year, two-way contract with the Nashville Predators for the 2026–27 season on July 1, 2026.

== Career statistics ==
=== Regular season and playoffs ===
| | | | Regular season | | | | | Playoffs |
| Season | Team | League | GP | G | A | Pts | PIM | GP | G | A | Pts | PIM |
|---|---|---|---|---|---|---|---|---|---|---|---|---|
| 2017–18 | Muskegon Lumberjacks | USHL | 31 | 0 | 0 | 0 | 4 | — | — | — | — | — |
| 2018–19 | Muskegon Lumberjacks | USHL | 24 | 3 | 8 | 11 | 18 | — | — | — | — | — |
| 2018–19 | Lincoln Stars | USHL | 28 | 2 | 9 | 11 | 63 | — | — | — | — | — |
| 2019–20 | London Knights | OHL | 62 | 6 | 26 | 32 | 51 | — | — | — | — | — |
| 2020–21 | Utah Grizzlies | ECHL | 26 | 7 | 10 | 17 | 19 | — | — | — | — | — |
| 2020–21 | Hartford Wolf Pack | AHL | 10 | 1 | 1 | 2 | 4 | — | — | — | — | — |
| 2021–22 | Hartford Wolf Pack | AHL | 48 | 4 | 9 | 13 | 34 | — | — | — | — | — |
| 2022–23 | Hartford Wolf Pack | AHL | 8 | 0 | 2 | 2 | 4 | — | — | — | — | — |
| 2022–23 | Jacksonville Icemen | ECHL | 22 | 3 | 5 | 8 | 12 | — | — | — | — | — |
| 2022–23 | Springfield Thunderbirds | AHL | 15 | 0 | 6 | 6 | 15 | — | — | — | — | — |
| 2023–24 | Springfield Thunderbirds | AHL | 50 | 3 | 7 | 10 | 94 | — | — | — | — | — |
| 2024–25 | Springfield Thunderbirds | AHL | 71 | 8 | 15 | 23 | 98 | 3 | 0 | 0 | 0 | 2 |
| 2025–26 | Springfield Thunderbirds | AHL | 60 | 7 | 12 | 19 | 61 | 2 | 0 | 0 | 0 | 0 |
| 2025–26 | St. Louis Blues | NHL | 1 | 0 | 0 | 0 | 0 | — | — | — | — | — |
| NHL totals | | | 1 | 0 | 0 | 0 | 0 | — | — | — | — | — |

=== International ===
Medal record

Men's ice hockey

Representing the United States

World Junior Championships
| Gold medal – first place | 2021 Canada | |

| Year | Team | Event | Result | GP | G | A | Pts | PIM |
|---|---|---|---|---|---|---|---|---|
| 2021 | United States | WJC | 1st place, gold medalist(s) | 1 | 0 | 0 | 0 | 0 |
| Junior totals | | | | 1 | 0 | 0 | 0 | 0 |
