= Shakir Mukhamadullin =

Russian ice hockey player (born 2002)

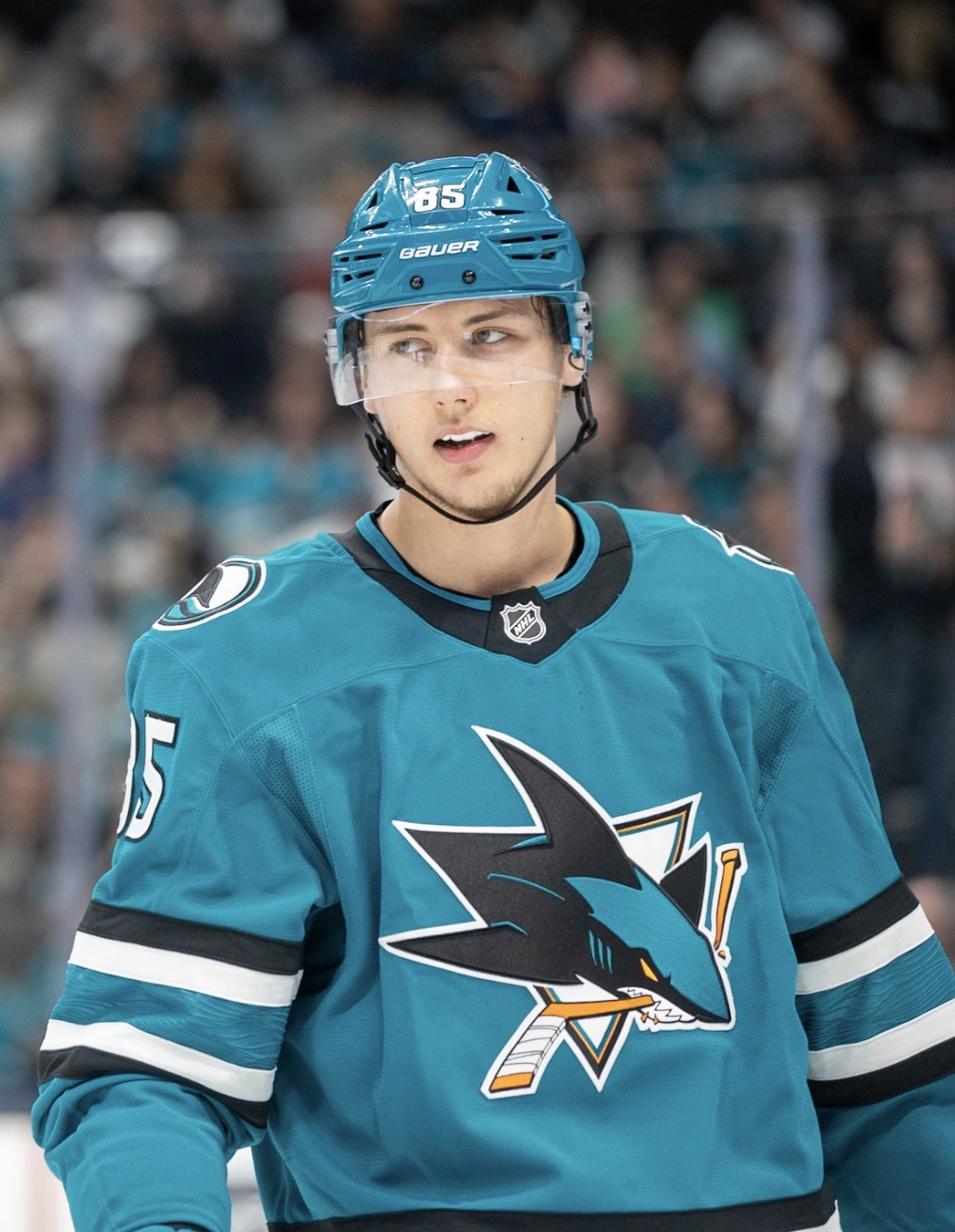
- Mukhamadullin in a San Jose Sharks game in 2026
- Born: 10 January 2002 (age 24) Ufa, Russia
- Height: 6 ft 5 in (196 cm)
- Weight: 205 lb (93 kg; 14 st 9 lb)
- Position: Defence
- Shoots: Left
- NHL team Former teams: Edmonton Oilers; Salavat Yulaev Ufa; San Jose Sharks
- NHL draft: 20th overall, 2020; New Jersey Devils
- Playing career: 2019–present

Shakir Maratovich Mukhamadullin (Russian: Шакир Маратович Мухамадуллин; born 10 January 2002) is a Russian professional ice hockey player who is a defenceman for the Edmonton Oilers of the National Hockey League (NHL). He was drafted 20th overall by the New Jersey Devils in the 2020 NHL entry draft.

== Playing career ==
=== KHL ===
Mukhamadullin first played as a youth with his hometown club, Salavat Yulaev Ufa of the Kontinental Hockey League (KHL). On 22 November 2020, Mukhamadullin broke the KHL record for most points by an 18-year-old defenseman in a single season, previously held by San Jose Sharks defenseman Dmitry Orlov.

During the 2021–22 season with Salavat, Mukhamadullin was signed to a three-year, entry-level contract with his draft team, the New Jersey Devils on 1 December 2021. He was to remain on loan in the KHL with Salavat for the remainder of the season. Following the playoff exit with Salavat, the Devils assigned Mukhamadullin to their AHL affiliate, the Utica Comets, for their post-season run. He made 3 appearances with the Comets, registering two assists.

On 14 July 2022, Mukhamadullin was reassigned by the Devils to continue his development on loan with Salavat Yulaev Ufa for the 2022–23 season. In an increased role with more responsibility on the blueline for Salavat, Mukhamadullin established new career bests with 6 goals and 25 points through 67 regular season games.

On 26 February 2023, Mukhamadullin was traded by the New Jersey Devils to the San Jose Sharks in a blockbuster multi-player trade, which involved Timo Meier. Helping Salavat place second in the Eastern Conference, he notched a 1 goal and 2 points through 6 playoff games in an upset quarterfinals defeat to Admiral Vladivostok.

=== NHL ===
Mukhamadullin began the 2023–24 season with the San Jose Barracuda, and on 25 January 2024 he was called up to the San Jose Sharks. Two days later, on 27 January 2024, Mukhamadullin made his NHL debut with the San Jose Sharks against the Buffalo Sabres. In May 2025, he re-signed with the Sharks, signing a one-year contract.

On 1 July 2026, Mukhamadullin was traded to the Edmonton Oilers along with Zack Sharp in exchange for Darnell Nurse. As a restricted free agent, he was signed to a two-year, $3 million contract extension with the Oilers on 4 July.

== International play ==
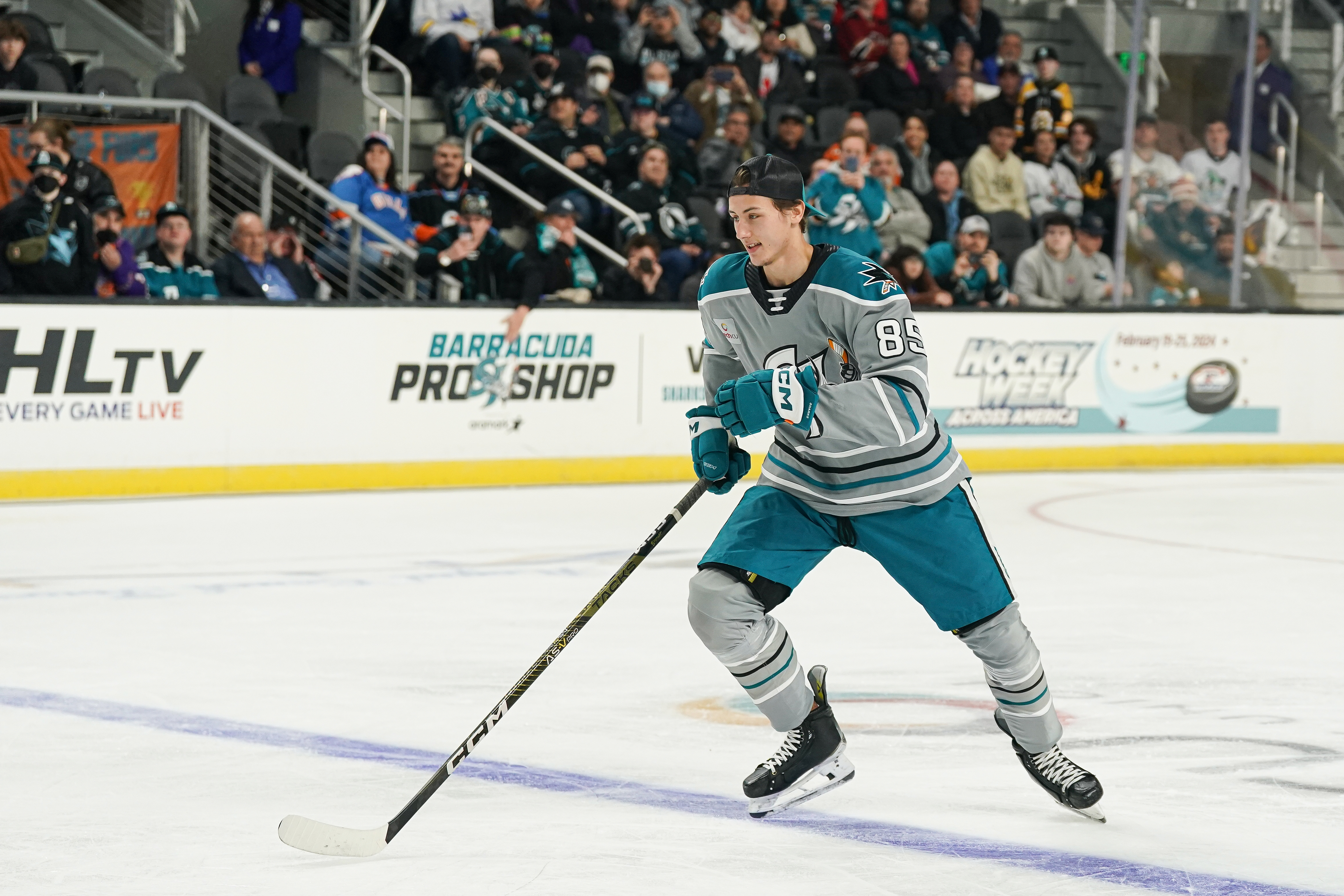
Mukhamadullin of the San Jose Barracuda during the 2024 American Hockey League (AHL) All Star Game.

Mukhamadullin represented Russia at the 2018 World U-17 Hockey Challenge, where he won a gold medal. He represented Russia at the 2019 Hlinka Gretzky Cup, where he recorded one assist in five games and won a gold medal. He again represented Russia at the 2019 IIHF World U18 Championships, where he won a silver medal. Mukhamadullin scored the game-winning goal in double-overtime at the 2019 World Junior A Challenge, helping Russia win their first gold medal in the World Junior A Challenge tournament.

== Personal life ==
Mukhamadullin is of Bashkir descent. He welcomed his first child in February 2026.

== Career statistics ==
=== Regular season and playoffs ===
			Regular season					Playoffs
Season	Team	League	GP	G	A	Pts	PIM	GP	G	A	Pts	PIM
2018–19	Tolpar Ufa	MHL	5	1	2	3	2	6	1	0	1	0
2019–20	Tolpar Ufa	MHL	13	2	8	10	6	2	0	0	0	4
2019–20	Salavat Yulaev Ufa	KHL	27	0	1	1	0	2	0	0	0	0
2019–20	Toros Neftekamsk	VHL	1	0	0	0	0	—	—	—	—	—
2020–21	Salavat Yulaev Ufa	KHL	39	3	7	10	10	—	—	—	—	—
2021–22	Salavat Yulaev Ufa	KHL	34	3	4	7	12	11	0	0	0	4
2021–22	Utica Comets	AHL	—	—	—	—	—	3	0	2	2	0
2022–23	Salavat Yulaev Ufa	KHL	67	6	19	25	35	6	1	1	2	2
2022–23	San Jose Barracuda	AHL	12	1	9	10	6	—	—	—	—	—
2023–24	San Jose Barracuda	AHL	55	7	27	34	24	—	—	—	—	—
2023–24	San Jose Sharks	NHL	3	0	1	1	4	—	—	—	—	—
2024–25	San Jose Barracuda	AHL	21	0	9	9	6	—	—	—	—	—
2024–25	San Jose Sharks	NHL	30	2	7	9	8	—	—	—	—	—
2025–26	San Jose Sharks	NHL	50	5	7	12	22	—	—	—	—	—
KHL totals			167	12	31	43	57	19	1	1	2	6
NHL totals			83	7	15	22	34	—	—	—	—	—

=== International ===
Year	Team	Event	Result	GP	G	A	Pts	PIM
2018	Russia	U17	1st place, gold medalist(s)	6	0	0	0	2
2019	Russia	U18	2nd place, silver medalist(s)	6	0	0	0	2
2019	Russia	HG18	1st place, gold medalist(s)	5	0	1	1	4
2019	Russia	WJAC	1st place, gold medalist(s)	6	1	2	3	8
2021	Russia	WJC	4th	7	0	0	0	0
Junior totals				30	1	3	4	16

Awards and achievements
Preceded by Dawson Mercer	New Jersey Devils first-round draft pick 2020	Succeeded by Luke Hughes
