= 2023–24 Big Ten Conference ice hockey season =

- Season: 2023–24
- Conference: Big Ten Conference
- Division: Division I
- Sport: ice hockey
- Duration: October 7, 2023– April 11, 2024
- Number of teams: 7
- TV partner(s): Big Ten Network

NHL Entry Draft
- Top draft pick: Artyom Levshunov
- Picked by: Chicago Blackhawks

Regular Season
- Season champions: Michigan State
- Season MVP: Gavin Brindley
- Top scorer: Gavin Brindley

Big Ten Tournament
- Tournament champions: Michigan State
- Runners-up: Michigan
- Tournament MVP: Trey Augustine
- Top scorer: Seamus Casey; Rutger McGroarty

NCAA Tournament
- Bids: 4
- Record: 4–4
- Best Finish: National Semifinal
- Team(s): Michigan; Michigan State; Minnesota; Wisconsin

The 2023–24 Big Ten Conference ice hockey season was the 34th season of play for the Big Ten Conference's men's ice hockey division and took place during the 2023–24 NCAA Division I men's ice hockey season. The season began on October 7, 2023 and concluded on April 11, 2024.

== Head coaches ==
=== Coaching changes ===
==== Wisconsin ====
On March 6, 2023, Wisconsin announced that Tony Granato was fired after seven seasons. On March 30, 2023, Mike Hastings was named as the new head coach for the Badgers.

=== Records ===
Team	Head coach	Season at school	Record at school	Big Ten record
Michigan	Brandon Naurato	2	26–12–3	12–10–2
Michigan State	Adam Nightingale	2	18–18–2	10–12–2
Minnesota	Bob Motzko	6	113–60–12	73–34–11
Notre Dame	Jeff Jackson	19	392–247–71	76–53–13
Ohio State	Steve Rohlik	11	183–143–39	90–87–20
Penn State	Guy Gadowsky	13	181–154–25	88–103–16
Wisconsin	Mike Hastings	1	0–0–0	0–0–0

== Standings ==
2023–24 Big Ten ice hockey Standings
	Conference record										Overall record					
	GP	W	L	T	OTW	OTL	3/SW	PTS	GF	GA	GP	W	L	T	GF	GA
#5 Michigan State †*	24	16	6	2	0	1	1	52	92	69	38	25	10	3	147	117
#11 Wisconsin	24	16	7	1	2	2	1	50	81	57	40	26	12	2	128	81
#7 Minnesota	24	13	7	4	3	1	0	41	80	65	39	23	11	5	135	100
#4 Michigan	24	11	11	2	1	1	1	36	85	77	41	23	15	3	169	125
Notre Dame	24	9	13	2	0	1	1	31	66	62	36	15	19	2	101	98
Penn State	24	7	14	3	0	1	2	27	62	92	36	15	18	3	113	130
Ohio State	24	4	18	2	1	0	2	15	50	94	38	14	20	4	100	124
Championship: March 23, 2024 † indicates conference regular season champion * indicates conference tournament champion Rankings: USCHO.com Top 20 Poll; updated April 11, 2024

== Non-Conference record ==
The Big Ten continued to outperform the other conferences. Every single league member had a winning non-conference record with the lowest (Michigan State) being .650. Only Hockey East had a winning record against the Big Ten but that was dwarfed by the overwhelming totals against four other leagues.

=== Regular season record ===
Team	Atlantic Hockey	CCHA	ECAC Hockey	Hockey East	Independent	NCHC	Total
Michigan	0–0–0	0–0–0	0–0–0	2–2–0	4–0–0	1–0–1	7–2–1
Michigan State	3–1–0	3–0–1	0–0–0	0–2–0	0–0–0	0–0–0	6–3–1
Minnesota	2–0–0	2–0–0	0–0–0	0–0–0	0–0–0	3–2–1	7–2–1
Notre Dame	2–1–0	2–0–0	1–1–0	1–2–0	0–0–0	0–0–0	6–4–0
Ohio State	2–0–0	2–0–0	2–0–0	0–0–0	1–0–1	1–0–1	8–0–2
Penn State	2–1–0	0–0–0	2–0–0	0–0–0	4–1–0	0–0–0	8–2–0
Wisconsin	1–0–0	5–0–0	0–0–0	1–0–0	2–1–1	0–1–0	9–2–1
Overall	12–3–0	14–0–1	5–1–0	4–6–0	11–2–2	5–3–3	51–15–6

== Statistics ==
=== Leading scorers ===
GP = Games played; G = Goals; A = Assists; Pts = Points; PIM = Penalty minutes

Player	Class	Team	GP	G	A	Pts	PIM
Gavin Brindley	Sophomore	Michigan	23	12	17	29	16
Rutger McGroarty	Sophomore	Michigan	21	10	17	27	6
Dylan Duke	Junior	Michigan	24	14	12	26	16
Rhett Pitlick	Junior	Minnesota	23	14	10	24	6
Bryce Brodzinski	Graduate	Minnesota	23	9	15	24	14
Artyom Levshunov	Freshman	Michigan State	24	6	18	24	34
Frank Nazar	Sophomore	Michigan	24	9	13	22	10
Cruz Lucius	Sophomore	Wisconsin	20	7	15	22	4
Isaac Howard	Sophomore	Michigan State	24	7	15	22	6
T. J. Hughes	Sophomore	Michigan	24	7	14	21	27
Karsen Dorwart	Sophomore	Michigan State	24	8	13	21	28

=== Leading goaltenders ===
Minimum 1/3 of team's minutes played in conference games.
GP = Games played; Min = Minutes played; W = Wins; L = Losses; T = Ties; GA = Goals against; SO = Shutouts; SV% = Save percentage; GAA = Goals against average

Player	Class	Team	GP	Min	W	L	T	GA	SO	SV%	GAA
Kyle McClellan	Senior	Wisconsin	23	1354:23	15	7	1	52	2	.923	2.30
Ryan Bischel	Graduate	Notre Dame	24	1434:34	9	13	2	59	1	.931	2.47
Justen Close	Senior	Minnesota	24	1391:47	13	6	4	58	2	.920	2.50
Trey Augustine	Freshman	Michigan State	24	1448:22	16	6	2	66	3	.922	2.73
Jake Barczewski	Graduate	Michigan	23	1340:54	10	11	2	64	1	.911	2.86

== Results ==
Note: All game times are local.

=== Regional Semifinals ===
==== East ====
March 29, 2024; 5:30 pm	(2) Wisconsin	2–3 (OT) (0–1, 2–1, 0–0, 0–1)	(3) Quinnipiac	Amica Mutual Pavilion; Attendance: 6,988

Game reference

Kyle McClellan
Goalies
Vinny Duplessis
Referees:
Brandon Schmitt
Nicholas Krebsbach
Linesmen:
Dana Penkivech
Jeff Schultz

	0–1	2:12 – Christophe Fillion (11) (Tellier, Tupker)
(unassisted) Quinn Finley (10) – 21:46	1–1
(Dexheimer, Mehlenbacher) Joe Palodichuk (3) – 23:01	2–1
	2–2	38:28 – Victor Czerneckianair (6) (Tupker, Cipollone)
	2–3	71:04 – GW – Victor Czerneckianair (7) (Treloar, Pennington)

8 min
Penalties
2 min
20
Shots
32

Game summary

==== Midwest ====
March 29, 2024; 4:00 pm	(1) Michigan State	5–4 (OT) (0–1, 2–3, 2–0, 1–0)	(4) Western Michigan	Centene Community Ice Center; Attendance: 3,148

Game reference

Trey Augustine
Goalies
Cameron Rowe
Referees:
Joseph Carusone
C. J. Hanafin
Linesmen:
Ryann Knapp
Patrick Dapuzzo

	0–1	7:29 – Matteo Costantini (11) (Hilsendager, Wendt)
(Geary, Basgall) Daniel Russell (9) – 25:05	1–1
(Dorwart) David Gucciardi (9) – 30:25	2–1
	2–2	32:51 – PP – Alex Bump (14) (Grainger, Sjolund)
	2–3	34:42 – Sam Colangelo (24) (Bump)
	2–4	36:11 – Zak Galambos (9) (Michaels, Fiedler)
(Shoudy, Kelly) Nash Nienhuis (9) – 48:15	3–4
(Levshunov, Howard) Karsen Dorwart (15) – EA – 59:05	4–4
(Nienhuis, Augustine) Jeremy Davidson (12) – GW – 68:47	5–4

2 min
Penalties
2 min
32
Shots
38

Game summary
Michigan State got on its horses straight away and put pressure on the WMU cage. Cameron Rowe had to stop the first six shots of the game and the Broncos didn't get the puck on Trey Augustine until the 5-minute mark. MSU dominated play through the first seven minutes but when Western finally got set up in the offensive zone, Matteo Costantini was able to use a screen by several players to beat Augustine from the top of the right circle for the first goal. The Broncos started getting the puck down low, behind the Michigan State goal line, and tried to win the puck with a combination of speed and board battles. The Spartans counterattacked with a solid backcheck and generated several chances off of the rush. The play between the two teams was fairly even for several minutes with both squads getting scoring chances though neither was able to sustain a continual attack. Both teams played physically throughout the period but Western seemed to get the better of the exchange.

Western Michigan got off to a quick start in the second and attacked the MSU net. Augustine and the defense were able to turn them away and allow the Spartan offense to take their turn in the offensive zone. At about the 3-minute mark, Wyatt Schingoethe got the puck at the top of the blue paint from a cross-crease pass but Augustine managed to slide over and make the save on the one-timer. Two minutes later, a stretch pass from Matt Basgall found Daniel Russell at center ice and gave the Spartan forward a 100-foot break away. Just as he got to the slot, Russell fired the puck through Rowe's six-hole to tie the game. The pace picked up afterwards and both gets got back to their speed game. After a few minutes, a shot from Daniel Hilsendager was stopped by Augustine but the puck squeaked through his arms and fell to the ice in the crease. Fortunately for Michigan State, a Spartan defender was first on the scene and he helped his goaltender freeze the puck for a faceoff. Coming out of the mid-period TV timeout, MSU won the offensive zone faceoff and David Gucciardi blasted the puck past Rowe from the blue line. Western went on the attack following the goal but MSU was able to clear the puck after a couple of chances. As the Broncos continued to press, Gavin O'Connell was called for a hooking penalty and give Western the first power play of the night. WMU won the faceoff and moved the puck around the Michigan State zone until it came to Alex Bump to the left of the goal He tried to pass the puck across the net but it deflected off of a defender's skate into the net. After tying the game, Western continued to pressure the Spartans and after a bouncing puck eluded an MSU player at center ice, Bump found a streaking Sam Colangelo who wired the puck into the goal past Augustine's Blocker. Michigan State tried to match the Broncos' effort but instead they could only watch as Zak Galambos scored a marker that was a mirror-image of the earlier Gucciardi goal, again, to Augustine's blocker-side. With the game starting to get away from them, MSU attacked the Western end vigorously and forced Galambos into a hooking penalty. Western challenged the play for a dive by Russell but the officials did not see enough evidence for a matching minor. Western was able to kill off the rest of the period but still left them with a minute more on the PK to start the third.

MSU was unable to get much going once play resumed and squandered their man-advantage. Western continued to carry the play and Luke Grainger nearly scored when his chip-shot from the low slot clanked off of the post and stayed out. Michigan State tried to get something going to cut into the Broncos' lead but every time they touched the puck a Western player was there to force the issue. Tim Washe was very conspicuous with several hard hits in the third but the Spartans refused to quit. Near the middle of the period, a turnover by Western at the own blue line allowed Michigan State to finally establish some zone time and eventually Nash Nienhuis was able to fire the puck past a screened Cameron Rowe to cut the lead to 1. WMU got right back to its high-pressure game after the goal and tried to regain their 2-goal lead but the Spartans had regained their footing and the two teams started exchanging scoring chances. With about six minutes to play, Bump got on a partial break from center ice but Augustine stood tall and made the save. After the play, an earlier hit by Washe was reviewed for a major penalty (contact to the head) but the officials decided against leveling an infraction. Once play resumed, the two goaltender both committed turnovers after handling the puck that led to scoring opportunities but neither surrendered a goal. With under three minutes to play, a second goal got behind Augustine after a save but MSU managed to clear the puck away. Moments later, after Augustine was pulled for an extra attacker, Rowe made a save but could not freeze the puck. The loose biscuit dribbled just to the side before being cleared by Western. Michigan State managed to prevent an attempt on their open goal and then raced up the ice. With less than a minute left, Artyom Levshunov skated the puck up the right side of the ice and, as he was approaching the goal line, he found Karsen Dorwart alone in front of the goal for the tying marker. The final 55 seconds passed to no effect and overtime was needed to settle the game.

The play settled down once overtime began with both teams playing a bit more hesitantly on their forechecking. The result was that though each team could now get into the offensive zone, much of the play was restricted to the perimeter. However, as play wore on, Michigan State began to turn zone time into scoring opportunities and Rowe was forced to stop several good chances. Western, conversely, was unable to get anything going offensively and didn't get a single shot on goal through eight minutes of play. Near the middle of the period, a Jeremy Davidson took a seemingly harmless shot on goal from the half wall but it deflected off of Hilsendager's stick past Rowe for the winning goal.

March 29, 2024; 7:30 pm	(2) North Dakota	3–4 (1–0, 1–1, 1–3)	(3) Michigan	Centene Community Ice Center; Attendance: 3,148

Game reference

Ludvig Persson
Goalies
Jake Barczewski
Referees:
Ryan Sweeney
Brendan Blanchard
Linesmen:
Brendan Lewis
Joe Sherman

(Wiebe) Hunter Johannes (12) – 4:46	1–0
	1–1	21:37 – Frank Nazar (17) (Holtz, Estapa)
(Pehrson, McLaughlin) Jackson Blake (22) – 28:18	2–1
	2–2	40:50 – Dylan Duke (23) (Fantilli)
	2–3	42:23 – T. J. Hughes (19) (Schifsky, T. Duke)
	2–4	51:56 – GW – Dylan Duke (24) (Hughes, Schifsky)
(Pehrson) Jackson Kunz (9) – 54:31	3–4

2 min
Penalties
2 min
27
Shots
30

Game summary

==== West ====
March 28, 2024; 7:30 pm	(2) Minnesota	3–2 (0–0, 1–1, 2–1)	(3) Omaha	Denny Sanford Premier Center; Attendance: 5,691

Game reference

Justen Close
Goalies
Simon Latkoczy
Referees:
Jeremy Tufts
Terrence Murphy
Linesmen:
Steven Murray
Jeff McCorkle

	0–1	21:51 – PP – Joaquim Lemay (5) (Guévin, Bremer)
(Kurth) Jimmy Clark (5) – 38:01	1–1
	1–2	44:28 – Ty Mueller (4) (Randl, Lemay)
(Brodzinski) Jaxon Nelson (17) – 49:15	2–2
(Brodzinski) Jaxon Nelson (18) – GW – 55:47	3–2

9 min
Penalties
4 min
39
Shots
36

Game summary

=== Regional finals ===
==== Midwest ====
March 31, 2024; 5:30 pm	(1) Michigan State	2–5 (1–0, 0–1, 1–4)	(3) Michigan	Centene Community Ice Center; Attendance: 3,148

Game reference

Trey Augustine
Goalies
Jake Barczewski
Referees:
Geoff Miller
Steven Rovillard
Linesmen:
Kevin Briganti
Nick Briganti

(Basgall, Howard) Gavin O'Connell (15) – PP – 6:20	1–0
	1–1	25:41 – Ethan Edwards (3) (D. Duke, Hughes)
	1–2	46:29 – Marshall Warren (4) (Truscott, Schifsky)
(Muller) Joey Larson (16) – PP – 50:26	2–2
	2–3	52:42 – GW – Dylan Duke (25) (Hughes, Schifsky)
	2–4	52:54 – Gavin Brindley (25) (Nazar, Edwards)
	2–5	57:41 – PP – Dylan Duke (26) (Brindley, Edwards)

12 min
Penalties
8 min
40
Shots
35

Game summary

==== West ====
March 30, 2024; 5:30 pm	(1) Boston University	6–3 (1–2, 3–1, 2–0)	(2) Minnesota	Denny Sanford Premier Center; Attendance: 6,113

Game reference

Mathieu Caron
Goalies
Justen Close
Referees:
Cameron Lynch
Jason Williams
Linesmen:
Steve Drain
John Rey

	0–1	7:19 – Jaxon Nelson (19) (Brodzinski, Rinzel)
	0–2	17:47 – Bryce Brodzinski (14) (Pitlick)
(unassisted) Quinn Hutson (18) – 18:01	1–2
(M. Celebrini, Harvey) Shane Lachance (13) – 21:17	2–2
(M. Celebrini, Lachance) Jack Harvey (7) – 25:25	3–2
	3–3	29:20 – Aaron Huglen (14) (Lamb, L. Mittelstadt)
(Peterson, C. McCarthy) Lane Hutson (15) – GW – 35:36	4–3
(Willander) Case McCarthy (4) – EN – 58:15	5–3
(M. Celebrini) Sam Stevens (10) – EN – 59:28	6–3

0 min
Penalties
0 min
38
Shots
28

Game summary
Boston University began the game on offense, getting several shots on Justen Close in the first few minutes. Minnesota's defense kept the Terriers from getting a great chance for a goal and then started matching BU's effort level. After several near-misses, the Gophers finally got their first shot just before the 5-minute mark. Shortly afterwards, Boston University set up for an extended period in the offensive zone and had several scoring chances but Close kept the game scoreless. Minnesota responded with an attack of their own and Jaxon Nelson twisted his body to fire a sharp-angle shot into the far corner of the goal for the opening score. The pace slowed down afterwards and little occurred over the next several minutes. Coming out of the TV timeout, Minnesota won a defensive zone faceoff and moved the puck up the ice. BU was first on the rubber but they turned the puck over and the Gophers got two great shots on goal. A minute later, the Terriers got their own high-percentage shot after a turnover but Sam Stevens could not get the puck into the goal. The near-miss appeared to reawaken Boston University and the Terriers got back to the same pace they had at the start of the period. The Gopher defense soon recovered and shut down a pair of Terrier rushes. Near the end of the period, Aaron Huglen forced Case McCarthy into a turnover along the wall. The puck was quickly moved to Bryce Brodzinski who shot the puck past Mathieu Caron's glove. After the ensuing faceoff, Quinn Hutson brought puck up the right side into the Minnesota zone and directed the puck towards the Gopher cage. The slow-motion puck seemed to catch Close off-guard and somehow slipped beneath the netminder's pad and was directed into the goal. The Gophers attacked after the fluky goal and were nearly able to regain their 2-goal edge but Caron made several saves to keep his team within one.

After the start of the second, BU wasted little time in getting to the offense. Macklin Celebrini grabbed the puck at the Minnesota blueline and skated to the right faceoff circle. He wheeled around a found a wide-open Shane Lachance at the left circle for a one-timer. Meanwhile, a Minnesota player ended up sliding into Justen Close and prevented the goaltender from getting into position. This allowed the shot from Lachance to easily sail into the net for the tying goal. The Terriers kept the pressure on and, four minutes later, Celebrini made another pass from the right side of the Gopher cage that ended up in the back of the net, this time to Jack Harvey. BU completely dominated the first seven minutes of the period but Minnesota finally got back into the game in the middle of the period. During an extended stay in the Terriers' end, Caron was forced to made several grade-A saves. The Gophers were able to make a line change and keep the pressure until a shot from Brody Lamb from the right circle. After sliding to his left, Caron was out of the crease as the puck settled in the blue paint. Aaron Huglen found the biscuit at his feet and was able to slap it into the net. In the second half of the period, Jaxon Nelson got a clean break in on the BU cage. While Caron made the save, the puck stayed with Minnesota and the Terrier netminder was forced to make several more stops. BU slowly got back to their game afterwards and continued the see-saw nature of the game. With less than five minutes in the period, Lane Hutson got the puck inside the Minnesota blueline and, after evading a Minnesota defender, skated in an arc down the left side and fired the puck towards the goal. He was apparently trying to find Sam Stevens, who was set up in the goal crease, but the puck hit Close in the left pad and was redirected into the goal. Minnesota took over in the waning minutes and got a good chance on goal but Caron made the save.

Minnesota took the initiative at the start of the third and Nelson had a chance to tie the score just 30 seconds in. BU evened out play afterwards and the two teams exchanged scoring chances. Neither team was able to establish a presence in the offensive zone for any length of time, however, and both teams were limited to end-to-end rushes. The Terriers finally got set up near the middle of the period but the Gopher defense kept them mostly to the outside. Minnesota counterattacked and got a few chances of their own but they too were checked closely by Boston University. In the later half of the period, Macklin Celebrini made a third miraculous pass from the right side but this time the shot was stopped by Close. As the play continued, the puck came back to Celebrini but the teenager caught an edge and Minnesota broke up the ice on a 2-on-1. Nelson passed the puck to Ryan Chesley but he fanned on the shot. About a minute later, Hughes got the puck near the Minnesota goal line and had a partially open net to shoot at but he couldn't overcome the steep angle. Both teams remained on an offensive footing and scoring chances were coming from all quarters. After BU iced the puck with about 2 two minutes to play, Close was pulled for an extra attacker. Minnesota could not get set up in the offensive zone and after their second attempt, Case McCarthy cleared the puck 200 feet into the Minnesota cage for a 2-goal lead. With no other option, Close was pulled again and minute later, Macklin Celebrini chipped the puck out of the zone to Sam Stevens and the second empty-net goal sealed the win for BU.

=== National semifinals ===
April 11, 2024; 8:10 pm	(E1) Boston College	4–0 (1–0, 2–0, 1–0)	(MW3) Michigan	Xcel Energy Center; Attendance: 18,598

Game reference

Jacob Fowler
Goalies
Jake Barczewski
Referees:
Ryan Hersey
Nathan Wieler
Linesmen:
Tyler Liffrig
Erik Contino

(Leonard, Perreault) Will Smith (24) – 1:20	1–0
(Perreault, Gustafsson) Will Smith (25) – 32:25	2–0
(unassisted) Cutter Gauthier (38) – 33:14	3–0
(unassisted) Gabe Perreault (19) – 45:03	4–0

8 min
Penalties
6 min
22
Shots
32

Game summary
Michigan started the game on the attack, getting several opportunities in the first minute plus. When Boston College counterattacked, Will Smith scored on the Eagle's first shot of the game over a sprawling Jake Barczewski from in tight. The goal didn't give Michigan any pause and the Wolverines got right back on the attack. Jacob Fowler had to stay dialed in and stop several good chances while the Maize and Blue searched for the equalizer. Near the middle of the period Smith nearly pulled off a miraculous move by dancing through the Wolverine defense but he lost the puck before he could get a shot on goal. A few minutes later, Mark Estapa hit Eamon Powell late and was given a minor penalty. BC got a good look early on the man-advantage but it lasted just 35 seconds before Ryan Leonard took a hooking minor. During the 4-on-4, both teams had chances but the best opportunity came just as the abbreviated Michigan power play was starting when Jake Barczewski flubbed the puck and Smith jumped on the loose rubber. Fortunately for the Wolverines, Smith didn't get much on his shot and Barczewski made the save. about 90 seconds later, Estapa was called for tripping to give the Eagles their third power play of the first period. Boston College had trouble setting up in the offensive zone and Frank Nazar ended up getting the best chance for Michigan. Both teams went on the attack for the final few minutes but a combination of good goaltending and shot blocking prevented the score from changing.

Boston College got off to a fast start in the middle period and, in the second minute, Leonard was nearly able to dance around Barczewski for a goal but the prone Wolverine netminder made the save with his right pad. A few minutes later, Cutter Gauthier received a penalty for interference. The nation's top power play looked to find a way to beat the best penalty kill. Michigan was able to get set up and move the puck but couldn't quite get a grade-A scoring chance. BC got on their horses and charged into the Michigan end afterwards. Oscar Jellvik had a great look at the net from the high slot but Gavin Brindley blocked the shot. The fast pace continued but both teams seemed to be relying more on their defense despite possessing the number two and three offenses in the nation. After the mid-way point of the game, Drew Fortescue mishandled the puck and forced himself into taking a minor penalty. BC's speed on the penalty kill caused Dylan Duke to take a matching tripping call just 24 seconds later to produce a second 4-on-4. Smith got ahold of the puck, wrapped around the goal, and fired a puck to the front of the net where it bounced off of both of Ethan Edwards' feet and into the goal. Less than a minute later, Cutter Gauthier got a breakaway from center ice and fired a shot through Barczewski's legs. BC appeared to relax after building a commanding lead but that seemed to feed into Michigan's game. In the final few minutes, the Wolverines desperately tried to cut into the lead and got several chances on goal but Fowler was equal to the task. Off of a turnover, Leonard nearly scored a fourth goal for the Eagles but the puck sailed through the crease.

In dire need of a goal, Michigan came charging out of the gate in the third and got several good looks on goal. With the Wolverines having to throw caution to the wind, Leonard was able to turn the puck over and get on a breakaway but Barczewski made the save to keep his team alive. The two teams exchanged opportunities in the first four minutes but both goaltenders remained firm. Just past the 5-minute mark, Gabe Perreault grabbed a loose puck, skated into the Michigan end, and wrapped the puck around the net for the fourth BC goal. The air came out of the Michigan balloon for a few minutes afterwards but eventually the Wolverines got back on the attack. Mike Posma made a potentially goal-saving slash near the middle of the period and gave Michigan a chance to finally get on the board with another power play. The Wolverines had their chances but they could not get the puck past Fowler. BC looked content to sit back and play defense for the rest of the game and just bleed the clock down. In the final ten minutes, the urgency seemed to have come out of Michigan's game. Even though they were still trying to score, the team was well aware that it would take a miracle for them to get back into the match. As time ticked away and Michigan remained goalless both teams accepted that the game was already over and the final few minutes passed without much issue.

== Ranking ==
=== USCHO ===
Team	Pre	1	2	3	4	5	6	7	8	9	10	12	13	14	15	16	17	18	19	20	21	22	23	24	Final
Michigan	5	6	7	6	4	8	12	14	13	14	15	15	15	15	14	12	11	14	17	16	14	11	10	10	4
Michigan State	9	8	8	8	12	11	11	7	8	7	7	8	8	7	8	8	9	6	4	6	6	4	5	4	5
Minnesota	3	2	1	1	6	6	6	8	7	10	9	10	12	10	9	9	8	8	8	8	8	6	8	7	7
Notre Dame	20	NR	NR	NR	NR	NR	17	18	NR	20	NR	NR	NR	NR	20	NR	NR	NR	NR	NR	NR	NR	NR	NR	NR
Ohio State	13	14	13	16	13	19	NR	NR	NR	NR	NR	NR	NR	NR	NR	NR	NR	NR	NR	NR	NR	NR	NR	NR	NR
Penn State	16	18	12	15	17	17	18	19	18	17	19	19	20	NR	NR	NR	NR	NR	NR	NR	NR	NR	NR	NR	NR
Wisconsin	NR	NR	NR	14	5	3	1	6	6	6	6	5	3	4	3	4	4	4	6	4	5	9	9	9	11

USCHO did not release a poll in weeks 11 and 25.

=== USA Hockey ===
Team	Pre	1	2	3	4	5	6	7	8	9	10	11	13	14	15	16	17	18	19	20	21	22	23	24	25	Final
Michigan	4	6	7	6	3	9	12	14	12	14	13	15	15	14	15	12	11	14	16	16	13	11	10	10	4	4
Michigan State	9	8	9	7	12	11	11	7	7	7	7	7	8	5	7	8	8	5	4	6	5	4	5	4	5	5
Minnesota	2	1	1	1	6	5	6	8	6	9	9	9	11	10	9	9	9	7	8	8	8	6	8	7	7	7
Notre Dame	19	NR	NR	NR	NR	NR	18	18	20	20	NR	NR	NR	NR	19	20	20	NR	20	NR	NR	NR	NR	NR	NR	NR
Ohio State	15	14	13	15	13	19	NR	NR	NR	NR	NR	NR	NR	NR	NR	NR	NR	NR	NR	NR	NR	NR	NR	NR	NR	NR
Penn State	16	17	11	14	17	16	19	19	18	17	18	18	19	NR	NR	NR	NR	NR	NR	NR	NR	NR	NR	NR	NR	NR
Wisconsin	NR	NR	NR	18	5	3	1	6	8	6	6	6	3	4	3	4	4	4	6	5	6	9	9	9	11	10

USA Hockey did not release a poll in week 12.

=== Pairwise ===
Team	1	2	3	4	5	6	7	8	9	10	12	13	14	15	16	17	18	19	20	21	22	23	Final
Michigan	25	21	12	14	15	19	23	16	15	15	15	14	14	14	12	11	15	16	14	13	10	10	10
Michigan State	1	5	14	25	11	13	7	9	9	7	7	8	3	7	7	7	5	3	5	5	5	5	4
Minnesota	32	36	8	27	19	12	12	12	11	13	11	14	12	9	9	9	8	9	8	7	6	8	6
Notre Dame	24	33	49	31	35	21	14	18	18	20	18	22	22	18	20	21	21	21	21	21	22	22	22
Ohio State	1	4	19	20	22	34	29	24	26	26	30	27	26	30	32	35	31	29	26	34	28	28	26
Penn State	1	3	17	21	21	22	19	15	17	19	19	18	20	24	22	24	23	24	24	22	23	23	23
Wisconsin	1	9	16	1	6	3	7	10	6	6	5	2	5	4	4	5	4	6	3	6	9	9	8

Note: teams ranked in the top-10 automatically qualify for the NCAA tournament. Teams ranked 11-16 can qualify based upon conference tournament results.

== Conference tournament ==
Teams are reseeded for the semifinals

Quarterfinals; March 8–10
2	Wisconsin	1	4	1
7	Ohio State	3	2	3
3	Minnesota	5	3	—
6	Penn State	1	2	—
4	Michigan	5	4	—
5	Notre Dame	4	3	—

Semifinals; March 16
1	Michigan State	2
7	Ohio State	1
3	Minnesota	1
4	Michigan	2

Championship; March 23
1	Michigan State	5*
4	Michigan	4

Note: * denotes overtime periods.

== Awards ==
=== NCAA ===
Award	Recipient
Mike Richter Award	Kyle McClellan, Wisconsin
AHCA All-American Teams
West First Team	Position
Seamus Casey, Michigan	D
Gavin Brindley, Michigan	F
West Second Team	Position
Kyle McClellan, Wisconsin	G
Artyom Levshunov, Michigan State	D
Rutger McGroarty, Michigan	F

=== Big Ten ===
Award		Recipient
Player of the Year		Gavin Brindley, Michigan
Defensive Player of the Year		Artyom Levshunov, Michigan State
Goaltender of the Year		Kyle McClellan, Wisconsin
Freshman of the Year		Artyom Levshunov, Michigan State
Scoring Champion		Gavin Brindley, Michigan
Coach of the Year		Adam Nightingale, Michigan State
Tournament Most Outstanding Player		Trey Augustine, Michigan State
All-Big Ten Teams
First Team	Position	Second Team
Kyle McClellan, Wisconsin	G	Trey Augustine, Michigan State
Seamus Casey, Michigan	D	Scooter Brickey, Ohio State
Artyom Levshunov, Michigan State	D	Ryan Chesley, Minnesota
	D	Sam Rinzel, Minnesota
Gavin Brindley, Michigan	F	Dylan Duke, Michigan
Rutger McGroarty, Michigan	F	Rhett Pitlick, Minnesota
Jimmy Snuggerud, Minnesota	F	Landon Slaggert, Notre Dame
Freshman Team	Position	
Trey Augustine, Michigan State	G	
Artyom Levshunov, Michigan State	D	
Sam Rinzel, Minnesota	D	
Aiden Fink, Penn State	F	
Oliver Moore, Minnesota	F	
Garrett Schifsky, Michigan	F	
Big Ten All-Tournament Team
Trey Augustine, Michigan State	G	
Seamus Casey, Michigan	D	
Nash Nienhuis, Michigan State	D	
Gavin Brindley, Michigan	F	
Rutger McGroarty, Michigan	F	
Daniel Russell, Michigan State	F	

== |2024 NHL entry draft ==
Round	Pick	Player	College	NHL team
1	2	Artyom Levshunov	Michigan State	Chicago Blackhawks
1	21	Michael Hage ^{†}	Michigan	Montreal Canadiens
1	28	Matvei Gridin ^{†}	Michigan	Calgary Flames
2	39	Gabriel Eliasson ^{†}	Michigan	Ottawa Senators
3	71	Brodie Ziemer ^{†}	Minnesota	Buffalo Sabres
4	108	Luke Osburn ^{†}	Wisconsin	Buffalo Sabres
4	112	Javon Moore ^{†}	Minnesota	Ottawa Senators
4	114	Nicholas Kempf ^{†}	Notre Dame	Washington Capitals
4	117	Blake Montgomery ^{†}	Wisconsin	Ottawa Senators
5	144	John Whipple ^{†}	Minnesota	Detroit Red Wings
5	148	Noah Powell ^{†}	Ohio State	Detroit Red Wings
6	172	Patrick Geary	Michigan State	Buffalo Sabres
7	197	Lucas Van Vliet ^{†}	Michigan State	Vegas Golden Knights
7	203	Austin Baker ^{†}	Michigan State	Detroit Red Wings
7	213	Erik Pahlsson ^{†}	Minnesota	Nashville Predators
7	215	Christian Humphreys ^{†}	Michigan	Colorado Avalanche

† incoming freshman
