= 2023–24 Michigan Wolverines men's ice hockey season =

NCAA Tournament, National semifinal
- Conference: Big Ten
- Home ice: Yost Ice Arena

Rankings
- USCHO: #4
- USA Hockey: #4

Record
- Overall: 23–15–3
- Conference: 11–11–2
- Home: 12–6–2
- Road: 9–7–1
- Neutral: 2–2–0

Coaches and captains
- Head coach: Brandon Naurato
- Assistant coaches: Rob Rassey; Mathew Deschamps; Kevin Reiter
- Captain: Jacob Truscott
- Alternate captain(s): Dylan Duke; Ethan Edwards; Philippe Lapointe; Marshall Warren

The 2023–24 Michigan Wolverines men's hockey team was the Wolverines' 102nd season of play for the program and 33rd in the Big Ten. The Wolverines represented the University of Michigan in the 2023–24 NCAA Division I men's ice hockey season, played their home games at Yost Ice Arena and were coached by Brandon Naurato in his second year.

== Previous season ==
During the 2022–23 season, Michigan went 26–12–3, including 12–10–2 in Big Ten play. They won the 2023 Big Ten men's ice hockey tournament and received an automatic bid to the 2023 NCAA Division I men's ice hockey tournament, where they reached their NCAA record 27th Frozen Four and were eliminated in the semifinals by eventual national champion Quinnipiac.

== Season ==
In the early part of the season, Michigan established itself as one of the top offenses in the nation. Despite losing some of its top talent, including the reigning scoring champion Adam Fantilli, the Wolverines were one of the highest scoring teams all season, averaging more than 4 goals per game. The majority of the scoring came from a small cadre of players with six Wolverines averaging at a point per game. Though the attack was a little top-heavy, Michigan was able to use their wealth of riches to put together the best power plays in college hockey, converting on more than one out of every three opportunities. However, not everything went in Michigan's favor. The Wolverine defense was lacking at times during the season and, though it was by no means the worst in the country, or even the Big Ten, the team had trouble keeping the puck out of the net. Transfer Jacob Barczewski assumed control of the net at the start of the season but his play was fairly inconsistent. The defense did a serviceable job in insulating their netminder, allowing less than 30 shots per game, but a lackluster penalty kill negated much of the advantage that the team received from their power play. Michigan allowed almost exactly three goals against per game, a high number for a team that had ambitions for a national title.

Those numbers were born out at the beginning of the year when the team had trouble sweeping a weekend series. The first time Michigan showed any kind of stability was when they faced Lindenwood at the end of October, but that had as much to do with how poor of a team the Lions were than anything from Michigan's side of the puck. November was less kind to the Wolverines when the team by being swept and then proceeded to slip towards the bottom of the conference standings. Whenever the offense stumbled, the defense was unable to bail the team out and by the time Michigan paused for the winter break, the team was barely above .500. At the time, the only saving grace for the team was that they had one of the most difficult schedules in the country and were just barely clinging on in the PairWise rankings.

Once the Wolverines returned to action, the same pattern from the first half persisted and the team was barely able to win two conference games in a row. The defense was unreliable to the point that Michigan could not ensure themselves of victory even when the offense was functioning properly. However, the team also continued to be buoyed by their strength of schedule as three other Big Ten teams were ranked in the top 10. Even though they were only able to earn weekend splits against the likes of Michigan State and Minnesota, the wins provided a bigger bonus that the penalty they suffered from losing. sweeps of Ohio State and Notre Dame gave the Wolverines just enough room to maneuver and keep their hopes of a tournament bid alive. At the close of the regular season Michigan sat 13th in the PairWise, just one spot above the last possible at-large position.

Michigan began their postseason with a home stand against Notre Dame, one of the teams that was still chasing a bid. A loss to the Irish would all but end Michigan's season so, with that in mind, the team faced a crisis in the opening game. Notre Dame's offense exploded for three goals in just over 3 minutes to take a 2-goal lead in the second period. Fortunately, after the Wolverines were able to cut their disadvantage in half, they were handed a glorious opportunity on the power play. Notre Dame took a minor with just under 2 minutes left in the second and then were handed a major penalty about a minute later. Michigan used their #1 power play to score twice on the major in the early part of the third to regain the lead and then completely stifled the Irish for the remainder of the match. The rematch followed a similar pattern with Notre Dame twice gaining a 1-goal advantage but both time they were unable to silence the Wolverines' attack. Though Michigan was only able to convert on one of their five man-advantages in the game, it was just enough to push the team over the top and earn a sweep of the Irish.

The two wins lifted Michigan up to 10 in the PairWise, all but guaranteeing the team an at-large bid. With the pressure off of the squad, the Wolverines produced one of the best defensive performances on the season and put the clamps on Minnesota in the semifinal. The Gophers were seemingly stunned by the suddenly defensive-minded Maize and Blue and were hardly able to generate any offense in the game. Minnesota's only goal came after they pulled their goaltender for an extra attacker but by then the Wolverines had already scored twice and quieted a normally raucous 3M Arena. Michigan found itself back in the conference championship game with a chance to become the first program to win three consecutive titles. Despite facing regular season champion Michigan State, the Wolvers showed now fear and came out firing, getting the opening goal in the first minute of play. The Spartan defense was able to collect itself afterwards and prevent further damage. The Wolverines were held without a goal for over 30 minutes, enabling the Spartans to turn the tables and gain their first lead of the game. However, on Michigan's third power play of the gam they were finally able to solve the MSU penalty kill and tie the match. After Marshall Warren gave Michigan its second lead of the night, MSU scored two quick goals in the dying seconds of the second and Michigan was down entering the third period. It took less than 3 minutes for Frank Nazar to even the score for the fourth time that evening with a deflection off of his foot, but Michigan then had to survive a barrage of shots from Michigan State. Barczewski held his ground and turned aside every Spartan shot in the third to force overtime. Play even put in the extra period but ultimately it was a point shot from MSU that proved to be the game-winner.

While Michigan was unable to retain their crown as Big Ten Champion, they still were ranked 10th in the PairWise and received a 3-seed for the NCAA tournament. They were placed opposite North Dakota and sent to the Midwest regional. Michigan was slow out of the gate and though they had a few chances, were only able to get 4 shots on goal in the first period. The Fighting Hawks were able to breach the Wolverine defense and score the first goal of the game, however, Michigan recovered to prevent any further goals in the period. Nazar evened the score at the start of the second but UND retook the lead before the midway point of the match. With North Dakota playing a stable brand of defense, Michigan only got one power play in the game and would have to rely on their even-strength play to get them back into the game. Less than a minute into the third, Michigan caught a lucky break when a shot from Dylan Duke was muffled and the puck skittered in on the Hawks' cage. The goaltender kicked the biscuit away but it hit the skate of a UND defender and deflected back into the net, tying the game. Michigan got on the attack and just two minutes later, T. J. Hughes popped a rebound into the net to put the Wolverines back on top. About 10 minutes afterwards, Duke got his second on the night with a one-timer and the Wolverines looked to be rolling to victory. However, with nothing left to lose, North Dakota went on the attack in the last part of the game and managed to cut the lead down to 1 with more than 5 minutes to play. Michigan and Barczewski had to stave off a desperate comeback attempt but the Wolverines were equal to the task and they moved on to the regional final.

The second round provided Michigan with a chance to end its 4-game losing streak to Michigan State and avenge their loss in the Big Ten championship. The Wolverines put themselves in a bad position when a minor from Gavin Brindley turned into a power play goal for MSU just six minutes into the game. The Spartans got into penalty trouble themselves but Michigan was unable to take advantage, failing to score on four separate chances in the first and second periods. However, in spite of the failure of the power play to score, the time on the man advantage disrupted the Spartans' offense and helped to prevent them from adding to their tally. Michigan was then gifted by goals from unlikely sourced when Ethan Edwards and Marshall Warren found the back of the net and Michigan got into the lead in the third period. After MSU tied the score just after the 50-minute mark, the Michigan offense finally woke up and scored two goals in just 12 seconds. Duke and Brindley each netted their 25th goals of the season and the quick scoring seemed to demoralize the Spartans. Down by two, Michigan State pulled their goaltender early but Barczewski stood tall in goal. As frustration began to set in for MSU, they were given a minor penalty for slashing with about two and a half minutes to play. Rather than sit on their lead, Michigan attacked on the power play and Duke deflected in a point shot for his fourth goal of the weekend and essentially ended the match.

Michigan returned to the Frozen Four for a record 28th time but faced an uphill battle against the #1 team in the nation, Boston College. The Wolverines quickly found themselves behind when the Eagles scored just 80 seconds into the match but the team wasn't ready to panic just yet. The BC defense proved to be much tougher than their previous two opponents and even with three power plays in the first two periods, Michigan was only able to get 15 shots on goal. Worse, BC used its superior skating to score twice on a 4-on-4 and build a commanding lead at the start of the third. Michigan tried desperately to solve the Boston College defense and though they were able to more than double their shot total in the final frame, they could not dent the twine. Michigan was shutout for the only time on the season and their championship dreams would have to wait for another year.

== Departures ==
| Player | Position | Nationality | Cause |
|---|---|---|---|
| Eric Ciccolini | Forward | Canada | Graduate transfer to Clarkson |
| Adam Fantilli | Forward | Canada | Signed professional contract (Columbus Blue Jackets) |
| Nick Granowicz | Forward | United States | Graduate transfer to UMass Lowell |
| Luke Hughes | Defenseman | United States | Signed professional contract (New Jersey Devils) |
| Jay Keranen | Defenseman | United States | Graduation (signed with Kalamazoo Wings) |
| Nolan Moyle | Forward | United States | Graduation (signed with Kunlun Red Star) |
| Keaton Pehrson | Defenseman | United States | Graduate transfer to North Dakota |
| Erik Portillo | Goaltender | Sweden | Signed professional contract (Los Angeles Kings) |
| Mackie Samoskevich | Forward | United States | Signed professional contract (Florida Panthers) |

== Recruiting ==
| Player | Position | Nationality | Age | Notes |
|---|---|---|---|---|
| Andrew Albano | Goaltender | Canada | 24 | Hamilton, ON; transfer from Norwich |
| Jacob Barczewski | Goaltender | United States | 24 | O'Fallon, MO; transfer from Canisius |
| Tyler Duke | Defenseman | United States | 19 | Strongsville, OH; transfer from Ohio State |
| Josh Eernisse | Forward | United States | 21 | Apple Valley, MN; transfer from St. Thomas |
| Nick Moldenhauer | Forward | Canada | 19 | Mississauga, ON |
| Josh Orrico | Defenseman | Canada | 19 | Woodbridge, ON |
| Chase Pletzke | Forward | United States | 23 | Bay City, MI; transfer from Miami |
| Tanner Rowe | Forward | United States | 20 | Calumet, MI |
| Garrett Schifsky | Forward | United States | 20 | Andover, MN |
| Marshall Warren | Defenseman | United States | 22 | Laurel Hollow, NY; transfer from Boston College |

== Roster ==
As of October 1, 2023.

| No. | Nat. | Player | Class | Pos | Height | Weight | DoB | Hometown | Previous team | NHL rights |
|---|---|---|---|---|---|---|---|---|---|---|
| 2 | (United States) | Rutger McGroarty | Sophomore | F | 6' 1" (1.85 m) | 200 lb (91 kg) | 2004-03-30 | Lincoln, Nebraska | USNTDP (USHL) | WPG, 14th overall 2022 |
| 4 | (United States) | Gavin Brindley | Sophomore | F | 5' 9" (1.75 m) | 170 lb (77 kg) | 2004-10-05 | Estero, Florida | Tri-City (USHL) | CBJ, 34th overall 2023 |
| 5 | (United States) | Tyler Duke | Sophomore | D | 5' 9" (1.75 m) | 180 lb (82 kg) | 2004-07-19 | Strongsville, Ohio | Ohio State (Big Ten) | — |
| 6 | (United States) | Josh Eernisse | Sophomore | F | 6' 2" (1.88 m) | 205 lb (93 kg) | 2004-12-31 | Apple Valley, Minnesota | St. Thomas (CCHA) | — |
| 9 | (Canada) | Nick Moldenhauer | Freshman | F | 5' 10" (1.78 m) | 175 lb (79 kg) | 2004-05-25 | Mississauga, Ontario | Chicago (USHL) | TOR, 95th overall 2022 |
| 12 | (United States) | Brendan Miles | Sophomore | D | 6' 1" (1.85 m) | 185 lb (84 kg) | 2001-12-12 | Farmington Hills, Michigan | Fairbanks (NAHL) | — |
| 13 | (Canada) | T. J. Hughes | Sophomore | F | 6' 0" (1.83 m) | 185 lb (84 kg) | 2001-11-09 | Hamilton, Ontario | Brooks (AJHL) | — |
| 15 | (United States) | Jacob Truscott | Senior | D | 6' 1" (1.85 m) | 185 lb (84 kg) | 2002-04-12 | Port Huron, Michigan | USNTDP (USHL) | VAN, 144th overall 2020 |
| 17 | (United States) | Garrett Schifsky | Freshman | F | 5' 9" (1.75 m) | 174 lb (79 kg) | 2003-04-08 | Andover, Minnesota | Waterloo (USHL) | — |
| 20 | (United States) | Tanner Rowe | Freshman | F | 6' 1" (1.85 m) | 179 lb (81 kg) | 2002-08-26 | Calumet, Michigan | Omaha (USHL) | — |
| 21 | (United States) | Jackson Hallum | Sophomore | F | 6' 0" (1.83 m) | 183 lb (83 kg) | 2002-09-08 | Eagan, Minnesota | Dubuque (USHL) | VGK, 91st overall 2020 |
| 22 | (United States) | Philippe Lapointe | Senior | F | 5' 11" (1.8 m) | 185 lb (84 kg) | 2000-02-29 | Novi, Michigan | Trail (BCHL) | — |
| 23 | (United States) | Chase Pletzke | Graduate | F | 5' 11" (1.8 m) | 175 lb (79 kg) | 2000-04-10 | Bay City, Michigan | Miami (NCHC) | — |
| 24 | (United States) | Steve Holtz | Senior | D | 6' 4" (1.93 m) | 200 lb (91 kg) | 1999-04-02 | White Lake, Michigan | Penticton (BCHL) | — |
| 25 | (United States) | Dylan Duke | Junior | F | 5' 10" (1.78 m) | 181 lb (82 kg) | 2003-03-04 | Strongsville, Ohio | USNTDP (USHL) | TBL, 126th overall 2021 |
| 26 | (United States) | Seamus Casey | Sophomore | D | 5' 10" (1.78 m) | 178 lb (81 kg) | 2004-01-08 | Fort Myers, Florida | USNTDP (USHL) | NJD, 46th overall 2022 |
| 29 | (Canada) | Andrew Albano | Graduate | G | 6' 0" (1.83 m) | 171 lb (78 kg) | 1998-11-09 | Hamilton, Ontario | Norwich (NEHC) | — |
| 30 | (United States) | Jacob Barczewski | Graduate | G | 6' 1" (1.85 m) | 180 lb (82 kg) | 1999-01-07 | O'Fallon, Missouri | Canisius (AHA) | — |
| 31 | (United States) | Noah West | Senior | G | 6' 2" (1.88 m) | 185 lb (84 kg) | 2000-11-25 | Pittsboro, Indiana | Robert Morris (AHA) | — |
| 33 | (United States) | Kienan Draper | Sophomore | F | 6' 0" (1.83 m) | 183 lb (83 kg) | 2002-02-19 | Bloomfield Hills, Michigan | Chilliwack (BCHL) | DET, 187th overall 2020 |
| 63 | (Canada) | Luca Fantilli | Sophomore | D | 6' 0" (1.83 m) | 183 lb (83 kg) | 2002-12-30 | Nobleton, Ontario | Chicago (USHL) | — |
| 68 | (Canada) | Josh Orrico | Freshman | D | 5' 9" (1.75 m) | 165 lb (75 kg) | 2003-06-15 | Woodbridge, Ontario | Janesville (NAHL) | — |
| 73 | (Canada) | Ethan Edwards | Junior | D | 5' 11" (1.8 m) | 190 lb (86 kg) | 2002-06-06 | St. Albert, Alberta | Sioux City (USHL) | NJD, 120th overall 2020 |
| 77 | (United States) | Marshall Warren | Graduate | D | 6' 0" (1.83 m) | 180 lb (82 kg) | 2001-04-20 | Laurel Hollow, New York | Boston College (HEA) | MIN, 166th overall 2019 |
| 91 | (United States) | Frank Nazar III | Sophomore | F | 5' 10" (1.78 m) | 175 lb (79 kg) | 2004-01-14 | Mount Clemens, Michigan | USNTDP (USHL) | CHI, 13th overall 2022 |
| 94 | (United States) | Mark Estapa | Junior | F | 6' 2" (1.88 m) | 206 lb (93 kg) | 2002-01-13 | St. Clair, Michigan | Tri-City (USHL) | — |

== Coaching staff ==
| Name | Position coached | Seasons at Michigan |
|---|---|---|
| Brandon Naurato | Head coach | 2nd |
| Rob Rassey | Associate head coach | 1st |
| Mathew Deschamps | Assistant coach | 1st |
| Kevin Reiter | Assistant coach | 1st |
| Evan Hall | Director of hockey operations | 1st |
| Joe Maher | Head strength and conditioning coach | 6th |

== Standings ==
2023–24 Big Ten ice hockey Standings
| | Conference record | | | | | | | | | | Overall record | | | | | |
| | GP | W | L | T | OTW | OTL | 3/SW | PTS | GF | GA | GP | W | L | T | GF | GA |
|---|---|---|---|---|---|---|---|---|---|---|---|---|---|---|---|---|
| #5 Michigan State †* | 24 | 16 | 6 | 2 | 0 | 1 | 1 | 52 | 92 | 69 | 38 | 25 | 10 | 3 | 147 | 117 |
| #11 Wisconsin | 24 | 16 | 7 | 1 | 2 | 2 | 1 | 50 | 81 | 57 | 40 | 26 | 12 | 2 | 128 | 81 |
| #7 Minnesota | 24 | 13 | 7 | 4 | 3 | 1 | 0 | 41 | 80 | 65 | 39 | 23 | 11 | 5 | 135 | 100 |
| #4 Michigan | 24 | 11 | 11 | 2 | 1 | 1 | 1 | 36 | 85 | 77 | 41 | 23 | 15 | 3 | 169 | 125 |
| Notre Dame | 24 | 9 | 13 | 2 | 0 | 1 | 1 | 31 | 66 | 62 | 36 | 15 | 19 | 2 | 101 | 98 |
| Penn State | 24 | 7 | 14 | 3 | 0 | 1 | 2 | 27 | 62 | 92 | 36 | 15 | 18 | 3 | 113 | 130 |
| Ohio State | 24 | 4 | 18 | 2 | 1 | 0 | 2 | 15 | 50 | 94 | 38 | 14 | 20 | 4 | 100 | 124 |
Championship: March 23, 2024 † indicates conference regular season champion * indicates conference tournament champion Rankings: USCHO.com Top 20 Poll; updated April 11, 2024

== Schedule and results ==
| Date | Time | Opponent^{#} | Rank^{#} | Site | TV | Decision | Result | Attendance | Record |
Exhibition
| September 30 | 7:00 PM | Simon Fraser* | #5 | Yost Ice Arena • Ann Arbor, MI (Exhibition) | | Barczewski | W 8–1 | 5,521 | — |
Regular season
| October 7 | 7:00 PM | #18 Providence* | #5 | Yost Ice Arena • Ann Arbor, MI | BTN+ | West | L 2–4 | 5,800 | 0–1–0 |
| October 8 | 4:00 PM | #18 Providence* | #5 | Yost Ice Arena • Ann Arbor, MI | BTN | Barczewski | W 5–4 | 5,419 | 1–1–0 |
| October 13 | 7:00 PM | at UMass* | #6 | Mullins Center • Amherst, MA | ESPN+ | Barczewski | W 7–2 | 7,361 | 2–1–0 |
| October 14 | 7:00 PM | at UMass* | #6 | Mullins Center • Amherst, MA | ESPN+ | Barczewski | L 3–6 | 8,412 | 2–2–0 |
| October 20 | 6:00 PM | #13 Ohio State | #7 | Yost Ice Arena • Ann Arbor, MI (Rivalry) | BTN | Barczewski | W 7–1 | 5,800 | 3–2–0 (1–0–0) |
| October 21 | 7:00 PM | #13 Ohio State | #7 | Yost Ice Arena • Ann Arbor, MI (Rivalry) | BTN+ | Barczewski | T 2–2 ^{SOL} | 5,800 | 3–2–1 (1–0–1) |
| October 27 | 7:00 PM | Lindenwood* | #6 | Yost Ice Arena • Ann Arbor, MI | BTN+ | West | W 9–1 | 5,800 | 4–2–1 |
| October 28 | 7:00 PM | Lindenwood* | #6 | Yost Ice Arena • Ann Arbor, MI | BTN+ | Barczewski | W 10–1 | 5,800 | 5–2–1 |
| November 3 | 8:00 PM | at #5 Wisconsin | #4 | Kohl Center • Madison, WI | BTN+ | Barczewski | L 4–5 | 10,114 | 5–3–1 (1–1–1) |
| November 4 | 7:00 PM | at #5 Wisconsin | #4 | Kohl Center • Madison, WI | BTN+ | Barczewski | L 1–2 | 12,218 | 5–4–1 (1–2–1) |
| November 10 | 7:00 PM | #6 Minnesota | #8 | Yost Ice Arena • Ann Arbor, MI (Rivalry) | BTN+ | Barczewski | L 3–4 | 5,800 | 5–5–1 (1–3–1) |
| November 11 | 7:00 PM | #6 Minnesota | #8 | Yost Ice Arena • Ann Arbor, MI (Rivalry) | BTN+ | Barczewski | T 2–2 ^{SOW} | 5,800 | 5–5–2 (1–3–2) |
| November 17 | 7:00 PM | #18 Penn State | #12 | Yost Ice Arena • Ann Arbor, MI | BTN+ | Barczewski | W 6–4 | 5,800 | 6–5–2 (2–3–2) |
| November 18 | 7:00 PM | #18 Penn State | #12 | Yost Ice Arena • Ann Arbor, MI | BTN+ | Barczewski | L 3–5 | 5,800 | 6–6–2 (2–4–2) |
| November 24 | 8:30 PM | at #17 St. Cloud State* | #14 | Herb Brooks National Hockey Center • St. Cloud, MN | Fox 9+ | Barczewski | W 2–0 | 3,978 | 7–6–2 |
| November 25 | 7:00 PM | at #17 St. Cloud State* | #14 | Herb Brooks National Hockey Center • St. Cloud, MN | Fox 9+ | Barczewski | T 3–3 ^{SOL} | 4,014 | 7–6–3 |
| December 1 | 7:30 PM | at Notre Dame | #13 | Compton Family Ice Arena • Notre Dame, IN (Rivalry) | Peacock | Barczewski | L 1–6 | 5,037 | 7–7–3 (2–5–2) |
| December 2 | 6:00 PM | at Notre Dame | #13 | Compton Family Ice Arena • Notre Dame, IN (Rivalry) | Peacock | Barczewski | W 2–1 | 5,014 | 8–7–3 (3–5–2) |
| January 6 | 7:00 PM | at USNTDP | #15 | USA Hockey Arena • Plymouth, MI (Exhibition) | BTN+ | Barczewski | W 5–1 | 3,924 | — |
| January 12 | 7:00 PM | Stonehill* | #15 | Yost Ice Arena • Ann Arbor, MI | BTN+ | Barczewski | W 12–4 | 5,800 | 9–7–3 |
| January 13 | 7:00 PM | Stonehill* | #15 | Yost Ice Arena • Ann Arbor, MI | BTN+ | West | W 7–1 | 5,800 | 10–7–3 |
| January 19 | 7:00 PM | at #7 Michigan State | #15 | Munn Ice Arena • East Lansing, MI (Rivalry) | BTN+ | Barczewski | W 7–1 | 6,555 | 11–7–3 (4–5–2) |
| January 20 | 7:00 PM | #7 Michigan State | #15 | Yost Ice Arena • Ann Arbor, MI (Rivalry) | BTN+ | Barczewski | L 5–7 | 5,800 | 11–8–3 (4–6–2) |
| January 26 | 7:00 PM | #3 Wisconsin | #14 | Yost Ice Arena • Ann Arbor, MI | BTN+ | Barczewski | W 5–1 | 5,800 | 12–8–3 (5–6–2) |
| January 27 | 7:00 PM | #3 Wisconsin | #14 | Yost Ice Arena • Ann Arbor, MI | BTN+ | Barczewski | L 5–6 ^{OT} | 5,800 | 12–9–3 (5–7–2) |
| February 2 | 7:00 PM | at Ohio State | #12 | Value City Arena • Columbus, OH (Rivalry) | BTN+ | Barczewski | W 4–2 | 8,131 | 13–9–3 (6–7–2) |
| February 3 | 8:00 PM | at Ohio State | #12 | Value City Arena • Columbus, OH (Rivalry) | BTN | Barczewski | W 4–1 | 8,789 | 14–9–3 (7–7–2) |
| February 9 | 7:00 PM | #9 Michigan State | #11 | Yost Ice Arena • Ann Arbor, MI (Rivalry) | BTN+ | Barczewski | L 1–5 | 5,800 | 14–10–3 (7–8–2) |
| February 10 | 8:30 PM | vs. #9 Michigan State | #11 | Little Caesars Arena • Detroit, MI (Duel in the D) | BTN | Barczewski | L 2–3 | 18,410 | 14–11–3 (7–9–2) |
| February 16 | 7:00 PM | at Penn State | #14 | Pegula Ice Arena • University Park, PA | BTN+ | Barczewski | W 5–3 | 6,499 | 15–11–3 (8–9–2) |
| February 17 | 7:00 PM | at Penn State | #14 | Pegula Ice Arena • University Park, PA | BTN | Barczewski | L 2–4 | 6,571 | 15–12–3 (8–10–2) |
| February 23 | 8:00 PM | Notre Dame | #17 | Yost Ice Arena • Ann Arbor, MI (Rivalry) | BTN | Barczewski | W 4–0 | 5,800 | 16–12–3 (9–10–2) |
| February 24 | 6:30 PM | Notre Dame | #17 | Yost Ice Arena • Ann Arbor, MI (Rivalry) | BTN | Barczewski | W 2–1 | 5,800 | 17–12–3 (10–10–2) |
| March 1 | 8:30 PM | #8 Minnesota | #16 | 3M Arena at Mariucci • Minneapolis, MN (Rivalry) | BTN | Barczewski | L 2–6 | 9,854 | 17–13–3 (10–11–2) |
| March 2 | 8:30 PM | #8 Minnesota | #16 | 3M Arena at Mariucci • Minneapolis, MN (Rivalry) | BTN | West | W 6–5 ^{OT} | 10,564 | 18–13–3 (11–11–2) |
Big Ten Tournament
| March 8 | 7:00 PM | Notre Dame | #14 | Yost Ice Arena • Ann Arbor, MI (Quarterfinals) | BTN+ | Barczewski | W 5–4 | 5,678 | 19–13–3 |
| March 9 | 7:00 PM | Notre Dame | #14 | Yost Ice Arena • Ann Arbor, MI (Quarterfinals) | BTN+ | Barczewski | W 4–3 | 5,800 | 20–13–3 |
| March 16 | 9:00 PM | at #6 Minnesota | #11 | 3M Arena at Mariucci • Minneapolis, MN (Semifinals) | BTN | Barczewski | W 2–1 | 10,336 | 21–13–3 |
| March 23 | 8:00 PM | at #5 Michigan State | #10 | Munn Ice Arena • East Lansing, MI (Championship) | BTN | Barczewski | L 4–5 ^{OT} | 6,555 | 21–14–3 |
NCAA Tournament
| March 29 | 8:30 PM | vs. #5 North Dakota | #10 | Centene Community Ice Center • Maryland Heights, MO (Regional semifinal) | ESPNU | Barczewski | W 4–3 | 3,148 | 22–14–3 |
| March 31 | 6:30 PM | vs. #4 Michigan State | #10 | Centene Community Ice Center • Maryland Heights, MO (Regional final) | ESPN2 | Barczewski | W 5–2 | 3,148 | 23–14–3 |
| April 11 | 8:30 PM | vs. #1 Boston College | #10 | Xcel Energy Center • Saint Paul, MN (National semifinals) | ESPN2 | Barczewski | L 0–4 | 18,958 | 23–15–3 |
*Non-conference game. ^{#}Rankings from USCHO.com Poll. All times are in Eastern Time. Source:

== Scoring statistics ==
| Name | Position | Games | Goals | Assists | Points | PIM |
|---|---|---|---|---|---|---|
| Gavin Brindley | RW | 40 | 25 | 28 | 53 | 28 |
| Rutger McGroarty | C/LW | 36 | 16 | 36 | 52 | 6 |
| Dylan Duke | C | 41 | 26 | 23 | 49 | 30 |
| T. J. Hughes | F | 41 | 19 | 29 | 48 | 27 |
| Seamus Casey | D | 40 | 7 | 38 | 45 | 14 |
| Frank Nazar | C/RW | 41 | 17 | 24 | 41 | 18 |
| Garrett Schifsky | C | 41 | 16 | 18 | 34 | 16 |
| Nick Moldenhauer | C/RW | 41 | 8 | 13 | 21 | 2 |
| Marshall Warren | D | 41 | 4 | 14 | 18 | 30 |
| Tyler Duke | D | 38 | 2 | 14 | 16 | 50 |
| Jacob Truscott | D | 41 | 2 | 14 | 16 | 41 |
| Josh Eernisse | F | 41 | 8 | 6 | 14 | 45 |
| Kienan Draper | RW | 37 | 4 | 8 | 12 | 24 |
| Ethan Edwards | D | 21 | 3 | 7 | 10 | 20 |
| Mark Estapa | F | 36 | 5 | 4 | 9 | 46 |
| Jackson Hallum | F | 9 | 3 | 5 | 8 | 0 |
| Luca Fantilli | D | 38 | 1 | 7 | 8 | 8 |
| Philippe Lapointe | F | 39 | 1 | 6 | 7 | 28 |
| Steven Holtz | D | 38 | 0 | 5 | 5 | 35 |
| Chase Pletzke | C | 30 | 1 | 1 | 2 | 0 |
| Tanner Rowe | F | 25 | 1 | 0 | 1 | 24 |
| Jake Barczewski | G | 37 | 0 | 1 | 1 | 0 |
| Brendan Miles | D | 6 | 0 | 0 | 0 | 0 |
| Noah West | G | 7 | 0 | 0 | 0 | 0 |
| Josh Orrico | D | 7 | 0 | 0 | 0 | 2 |
| Total | | | 169 | 301 | 470 | 504 |

== Goaltending statistics ==
| Name | Games | Minutes | Wins | Losses | Ties | Goals Against | Saves | Shut Outs | SV % | GAA |
|---|---|---|---|---|---|---|---|---|---|---|
| Jake Barczewski | 38 | 2194:46 | 20 | 14 | 3 | 104 | 1011 | 2 | .907 | 2.84 |
| Noah West | 9 | 279:55 | 3 | 1 | 0 | 14 | 103 | 0 | .880 | 3.00 |
| Empty Net | - | 16:34 | - | - | - | 7 | - | - | - | - |
| Total | 41 | 2491:15 | 23 | 15 | 3 | 125 | 1114 | 2 | .899 | 3.01 |

== Rankings ==
| Poll | Week | | | | | | | | | | | | | | | | | | | | | | | | | | |
| Poll | Pre | 1 | 2 | 3 | 4 | 5 | 6 | 7 | 8 | 9 | 10 | 11 | 12 | 13 | 14 | 15 | 16 | 17 | 18 | 19 | 20 | 21 | 22 | 23 | 24 | 25 | 26 (Final) |
|---|---|---|---|---|---|---|---|---|---|---|---|---|---|---|---|---|---|---|---|---|---|---|---|---|---|---|---|
| USCHO.com | 5 (1) | 6 | 7 | 6 | 4 | 8 | 12 | 14 | 13 | 14 | 15 | – | 15 | 15 | 15 | 14 | 12 | 11 | 14 | 17 | 16 | 14 | 11 | 10 | 10 | – | 4 |
| USA Hockey | 4 | 6 | 7 | 6 | 3 | 9 | 12 | 14 | 12 | 14 | 13 | 15 | – | 15 | 14 | 15 | 12 | 11 | 14 | 16 | 16 | 13 | 11 | 10 | 10 | 4 | 4 |

Note: USCHO did not release a poll in weeks 11 or 25.
Note: USA Hockey did not release a poll in week 12.

== Awards and honors ==
Weekly Awards
| Player | Award | Date Awarded | Ref. |
|---|---|---|---|
| Rutger McGroarty | Big Ten First Star of the Week | October 10, 2023 | |
| Jake Barczewski | Big Ten Second Star of the Week | October 24, 2023 | |
| T. J. Hughes | Big Ten Second Star of the Week | October 31, 2023 | |
| Jake Barczewski | Big Ten Second Star of the Week | November 28, 2023 | |
| Gavin Brindley | Big Ten First Star of the Week | January 16, 2024 | |
| Rutger McGroarty | Big Ten First Star of the Week | January 23, 2024 | |
| Frank Nazar | Big Ten First Star of the Week | January 30, 2024 | |
| Jake Barczewski | Big Ten Third Star of the Week | February 6, 2024 | |
| Jake Barczewski | Big Ten First Star of the Week | February 27, 2024 | |
| Seamus Casey | Big Ten Third Star of the Week | March 5, 2024 | |

| Player | Award | Ref |
|---|---|---|
| Gavin Brindley | Big Ten Player of the Year | |
| Gavin Brindley | All-Big Ten First Team | |
| Seamus Casey | All-Big Ten First Team | |
| Rutger McGroarty | All-Big Ten First Team | |
| Dylan Duke | All-Big Ten Second Team | |
| Garrett Schifsky | All-Big Ten Freshman Team | |
| Gavin Brindley | Big Ten All-Tournament Team | |
| Seamus Casey | Big Ten All-Tournament Team | |
| Rutger McGroarty | Big Ten All-Tournament Team | |
| Gavin Brindley | AHCA West First Team All-American | |
| Seamus Casey | AHCA West First Team All-American | |
| Rutger McGroarty | AHCA West Second Team All-American | |

== Players drafted into the NHL ==
Michigan had three players drafted in the 2022 NHL entry draft. Frank Nazar and Rutger McGroarty were selected back-to-back in the first round of the NHL Draft, while Seamus Casey was drafted 46th overall. Michigan had one player drafted in the 2023 NHL entry draft. Gavin Brindley was drafted 34th overall.

| Year | Round | Pick | Player | NHL team |
|---|---|---|---|---|
| 2022 | 1 | 13 | Frank Nazar | Chicago Blackhawks |
| 2022 | 1 | 14 | Rutger McGroarty | Winnipeg Jets |
| 2023 | 2 | 34 | Gavin Brindley | Columbus Blue Jackets |
| 2022 | 2 | 46 | Seamus Casey | New Jersey Devils |
