= 2023–24 Minnesota Golden Gophers men's ice hockey season =

NCAA Tournament, Regional Final
- Conference: 3rd Big Ten
- Home ice: 3M Arena at Mariucci

Rankings
- USCHO: #7
- USA Hockey: #7

Record
- Overall: 23–11–5
- Conference: 13–7–4
- Home: 14–6–1
- Road: 7–4–4
- Neutral: 2–1–0

Coaches and captains
- Head coach: Bob Motzko
- Assistant coaches: Steve Miller; Ben Gordon; Brennan Poderzay
- Captains: Bryce Brodzinski; Mike Koster; Jaxon Nelson; Mason Nevers

The 2023–24 Minnesota Golden Gophers men's ice hockey season was the 103rd season of play for the program and 34th in the Big Ten. The Golden Gophers represented the University of Minnesota in the 2023–24 NCAA Division I men's ice hockey season, played their home games at 3M Arena at Mariucci and were coached by Bob Motzko in his 6th season.

== Season ==
While Minnesota had only lost a handful of players in the offseason, the top half of the defense had been completely removed. The Gophers were also having to contend with the loss of top prospect Logan Cooley who signed professionally during the offseason. The addition of two 1st-round draft picks was expected to offset some of the departures. The most stable part of the roster was in goal where Justen Close had returned for his fifth season.

The Gophers needed overtime to take down St. Thomas, but the defense soon righted itself and Close posted consecutive shutouts to get the team the #1 ranking early in the season. A scoring lull at the end of October resulted in three consecutive losses for Minnesota but afterwards the team recovered. From the beginning of November until the end of the season, Minnesota lost only one every four or five games. While the remade defense was nearly as good as it had been the year before, the offense took the biggest dip with the Gophers scoring 30 fewer goals. That, however, did not mean that the Gophers couldn't score, just that the team wasn't about to dominate the competition as much as they had in '23.

Minnesota's schedule was rife with ranked teams and that provided the team some leeway in their record. Even with 9 losses, the Gophers strength of schedule enabled the team to remain in the top-10 for most of the season. By the start of the postseason, Minnesota was 8th in the PairWise and guaranteed a spot in the NCAA tournament. Depending on their performance in the conference tournament, the team could receive anything from a 1st- to a 3rd-seed and they began their title chase against Penn State. The first game resulted in a win for the Gophers, while the team lost in the second game where Close saw 48 shots on goal, leading to a tie entering the third period. The Gophers won the game with just over a minute remaining in the game when Aaron Huglen tipped a Brody Lamb shot.

The semifinal match against Michigan promised to be a barn-burner with two of the nation's #4 offense coming to town. Both teams had already punched their ticket to the NCAA tournament but that would not stop the old rivals from slugging it out with Minnesota looking for revenge against the team that robbed them of the past two Big Ten championships. Against all predictions, Michigan put up a solid defensive effort and for a team that allowed over 3 goals against per game, the Gophers were caught off-guard. Minnesota was unable to respond to the counterpunching style that Michigan was suddenly employing and they found themselves down by a pair entering the third period. It wasn't until Close was pulled for an extra attacker that the team managed to break through. Jimmy Snuggerud's 21st came with 90 seconds left on the clock but Minnesota was unable to get the equalizer and they were bounced out of the conference tournament.

The Gophers ended tied for 6th in the PairWise and received a #2 seed for the tournament. They were sent to the West regional and faced Omaha in the first round. Though the Mavericks were technically the host team, both campuses weren't far away and the Gophers had plenty of fans in attendance. The raucous crowd watched a fairly even game with both teams starting slow before picking up the pace in the second period. Minnesota fell behind twice but Close prevented Omaha from pulling away. in the latter part of the game, Jaxon Nelson turned into the hero. He first tied the match on a one-timer from the slot and then scored the winning goal by deflecting a Bryce Brodzinski shot from the top of the crease. The final four minutes saw a furious comeback attempt from the Mavs but the Gopher defense collapsed around Close and they were able to eke out a 3–2 win.

In the Regional Final, Minnesota faced Boston University, the #2 team in the nation who possessed the top prospect for the upcoming NHL Draft. Despite being the underdog, Nelson and Brodzinski again sparked the Gopher's offense and staked the team to a two-goal lead in the first period. However, BU could not be denied and the lead was cut in half before the end of the period. The Terriers' offense took over in the middle frame, scoring twice in just over 4 minutes to take the lead. Huglen tied the game near the mid point but BU pulled ahead for a second time before intermission. Both teams attacked throughout the third but neither could find the goal. Minnesota was forced to pull Close in their pursuit of the tying goal but that only served to allow two empty-net goals from Boston University and Minnesota's season came to a close.

== Departures ==
Player	Position	Nationality	Cause
Owen Bartoszkiewicz	Goaltender	United States	Returned to juniors (Youngstown Phantoms)
Logan Cooley	Forward	United States	Signed professional contract (Arizona Coyotes)
Brock Faber	Defenseman	United States	Signed professional contract (Minnesota Wild)
Ryan Johnson	Defenseman	United States	Graduation (signed with Buffalo Sabres)
Matthew Knies	Forward	United States	Signed professional contract (Toronto Maple Leafs)
Jackson LaCombe	Defenseman	United States	Signed professional contract (Anaheim Ducks)
Colin Schmidt	Forward	United States	Graduation (retired)
Matt Staudacher	Defenseman	United States	Graduate transfer to Northeastern

== Recruiting ==
Player	Position	Nationality	Age	Notes
Nathan Airey	Goaltender	Canada	20	Cochrane, AB
Axel Begley	Defenseman	United States	19	Mahtomedi, MN
Matt Bryant	Goaltender	United States	20	La Crosse, WI; joined mid-season from club team
Jimmy Clark	Forward	United States	19	Edina, MN; selected 213th overall in 2023
Nick Michel	Forward	United States	24	Waconia, MN; transfer from Saint John's
Oliver Moore	Forward	United States	18	Mounds View, MN; selected 19th overall in 2023
Sam Rinzel	Defenseman	United States	19	Chanhassen, MN; selected 25th overall in 2022
Max Rud	Defenseman	United States	20	St. Cloud, MN

== Roster ==
As of January 30, 2024.

No.	Nat.	Player	Class	Pos	Height	Weight	DoB	Hometown	Previous team	NHL rights
1	(Canada)	Justen Close	Graduate	G	5' 10" (1.78 m)	175 lb (79 kg)	1998-05-20	Kindersley, Saskatchewan	Kindersley Klippers (SJHL)	—
4	(United States)	Mike Koster (C)	Senior	D	5' 10" (1.78 m)	180 lb (82 kg)	2001-04-13	Chaska, Minnesota	Tri-City Storm (USHL)	TOR, 146th overall 2019
5	(United States)	Sam Rinzel	Freshman	D	6' 4" (1.93 m)	185 lb (84 kg)	2004-06-25	Chanhassen, Minnesota	Waterloo Black Hawks (USHL)	CHI, 25th overall 2022
6	(United States)	Cal Thomas	Sophomore	D	6' 0" (1.83 m)	185 lb (84 kg)	2003-05-08	Maple Grove, Minnesota	Chicago Steel (USHL)	ARI, 171st overall 2021
7	(United States)	Aaron Huglen	Junior	F	6' 0" (1.83 m)	170 lb (77 kg)	2001-03-06	Roseau, Minnesota	Fargo Force (USHL)	BUF, 102nd overall 2019
9	(United States)	Nick Michel	Senior	F	5' 11" (1.8 m)	180 lb (82 kg)	1999-03-16	Waconia, Minnesota	Saint John's (MIAC)	—
10	(United States)	Connor Kurth	Sophomore	F	6' 0" (1.83 m)	210 lb (95 kg)	2003-07-30	Lindstrom, Minnesota	Dubuque Fighting Saints (USHL)	TBL, 190th overall 2022
11	(United States)	Oliver Moore	Freshman	F	5' 11" (1.8 m)	190 lb (86 kg)	2005-01-22	Mounds View, Minnesota	USNTDP (USHL)	CHI, 19th overall 2023
13	(United States)	Garrett Pinoniemi	Sophomore	F	6' 0" (1.83 m)	170 lb (77 kg)	2001-07-15	Mound, Minnesota	Sioux Falls Stampede (USHL)	—
15	(United States)	Max Rud	Freshman	D	6' 3" (1.91 m)	185 lb (84 kg)	2003-09-17	St. Cloud, Minnesota	Sioux Falls Stampede (USHL)	—
17	(United States)	Brody Lamb	Sophomore	F	6' 1" (1.85 m)	175 lb (79 kg)	2003-08-30	Byron, Minnesota	Green Bay Gamblers (USHL)	NYR, 104th overall 2021
18	(United States)	Mason Nevers (C)	Senior	F	5' 11" (1.8 m)	175 lb (79 kg)	2001-04-03	Edina, Minnesota	Des Moines Buccaneers (USHL)	—
19	(United States)	John Mittelstadt	Sophomore	F	5' 9" (1.75 m)	175 lb (79 kg)	2001-10-27	Eden Prairie, Minnesota	Green Bay Gamblers (USHL)	—
20	(United States)	Luke Mittelstadt	Sophomore	D	5' 11" (1.8 m)	175 lb (79 kg)	2003-01-22	Eden Prairie, Minnesota	Madison Capitols (USHL)	MTL, 197th overall 2023
22	(United States)	Bryce Brodzinski (C)	Graduate	F	6' 0" (1.83 m)	205 lb (93 kg)	2000-08-09	Blaine, Minnesota	Blaine High School (USHS–MN)	PHI, 196th overall 2019
23	(United States)	Jimmy Clark	Freshman	F	6' 0" (1.83 m)	180 lb (82 kg)	2004-09-24	Edina, Minnesota	Green Bay Gamblers (USHL)	MIN, 213th overall 2023
24	(United States)	Jaxon Nelson (C)	Graduate	F	6' 4" (1.93 m)	225 lb (102 kg)	2000-03-30	Magnolia, Minnesota	Omaha Lancers (USHL)	—
26	(United States)	Carl Fish	Senior	D	6' 3" (1.91 m)	210 lb (95 kg)	1999-11-09	Saint Paul, Minnesota	Bismarck Bobcats (NAHL)	—
27	(United States)	Charlie Strobel	Sophomore	F	6' 1" (1.85 m)	190 lb (86 kg)	2001-07-09	Stillwater, Minnesota	Trail Smoke Eaters (BCHL)	—
29	(Canada)	Nathan Airey	Freshman	G	6' 3" (1.91 m)	190 lb (86 kg)	2003-04-24	Cochrane, Alberta	Cranbrook Bucks (BCHL)	—
30	(United States)	Zach Wiese	Sophomore	G	5' 10" (1.78 m)	210 lb (95 kg)	2002-01-02	Owatonna, Minnesota	Rochester Grizzlies (NA3HL)	—
33	(United States)	Axel Begley	Freshman	D	6' 2" (1.88 m)	200 lb (91 kg)	2003-12-16	Mahtomedi, Minnesota	Wisconsin Windigo (NAHL)	—
35	(United States)	Matt Bryant	Sophomore	G	6' 2" (1.88 m)	170 lb (77 kg)	2003-04-15	La Crosse, Wisconsin	Minnesota (ACHA)	—
71	(United States)	Ryan Chesley	Sophomore	D	6' 0" (1.83 m)	200 lb (91 kg)	2004-02-27	Mahtomedi, Minnesota	USNTDP (USHL)	WSH, 37th overall 2022
77	(United States)	Rhett Pitlick	Junior	F	5' 10" (1.78 m)	165 lb (75 kg)	2001-02-07	Plymouth, Minnesota	Tri-City Storm (USHL)	MTL, 131st overall 2019
81	(United States)	Jimmy Snuggerud	Sophomore	F	6' 1" (1.85 m)	185 lb (84 kg)	2004-06-01	Chaska, Minnesota	USNTDP (USHL)	STL, 23rd overall 2022

== Standings ==
2023–24 Big Ten ice hockey Standings
	Conference record										Overall record					
	GP	W	L	T	OTW	OTL	3/SW	PTS	GF	GA	GP	W	L	T	GF	GA
#5 Michigan State †*	24	16	6	2	0	1	1	52	92	69	38	25	10	3	147	117
#11 Wisconsin	24	16	7	1	2	2	1	50	81	57	40	26	12	2	128	81
#7 Minnesota	24	13	7	4	3	1	0	41	80	65	39	23	11	5	135	100
#4 Michigan	24	11	11	2	1	1	1	36	85	77	41	23	15	3	169	125
Notre Dame	24	9	13	2	0	1	1	31	66	62	36	15	19	2	101	98
Penn State	24	7	14	3	0	1	2	27	62	92	36	15	18	3	113	130
Ohio State	24	4	18	2	1	0	2	15	50	94	38	14	20	4	100	124
Championship: March 23, 2024 † indicates conference regular season champion * indicates conference tournament champion Rankings: USCHO.com Top 20 Poll; updated April 11, 2024

== Schedule and results ==
Date	Time	Opponent^{#}	Rank^{#}	Site	TV	Decision	Result	Attendance	Record
Exhibition
October 8	6:00 pm	Bemidji State*	#3	3M Arena at Mariucci • Minneapolis, Minnesota (Exhibition)	BTN+	Wiese	W 5–2	8,289	
Regular Season
October 13	7:30 pm	vs. St. Thomas*	#2	Xcel Energy Center • Saint Paul, Minnesota	Fox 9	Close	W 6–5 ^{OT}	11,376	1–0–0
October 14	6:00 pm	St. Thomas*	#2	3M Arena at Mariucci • Minneapolis, Minnesota	Fox 9+, BTN+	Close	W 3–0	9,862	2–0–0
October 20	7:00 pm	at #5 North Dakota*	#1	Ralph Engelstad Arena • Grand Forks, North Dakota (Rivalry)	Fox 9, Midco	Close	W 4–0	11,616	3–0–0
October 21	6:00 pm	at #5 North Dakota*	#1	Ralph Engelstad Arena • Grand Forks, North Dakota (Rivalry)	Fox 9+, Midco	Close	L 1–2	11,636	3–1–0
October 26	8:00 pm	#14 Wisconsin	#1	3M Arena at Mariucci • Minneapolis, Minnesota (Rivalry)	BTN	Close	L 2–5	8,461	3–2–0 (0–1–0)
October 27	8:00 pm	#14 Wisconsin	#1	3M Arena at Mariucci • Minneapolis, Minnesota (Rivalry)	BTN	Close	L 2–3	10,363	3–3–0 (0–2–0)
November 3	7:00 pm	#14 Minnesota Duluth*	#6	3M Arena at Mariucci • Minneapolis, Minnesota (Rivalry)	Fox 9+, BTN+	Close	W 5–1	10,739	4–3–0
November 4	7:00 pm	#14 Minnesota Duluth*	#6	3M Arena at Mariucci • Minneapolis, Minnesota (Rivalry)	Fox 9+	Close	T 3–3 ^{OT}	7,345	4–3–1
November 10	6:00 pm	at #8 Michigan	#6	Yost Ice Arena • Ann Arbor, Michigan (Rivalry)	BTN+	Close	W 4–3	5,800	5–3–1 (1–2–0)
November 11	6:00 pm	at #8 Michigan	#6	Yost Ice Arena • Ann Arbor, Michigan (Rivalry)	BTN+	Close	T 2–2 ^{SOL}	5,800	5–3–2 (1–2–1)
November 17	7:00 pm	#17 Notre Dame	#6	3M Arena at Mariucci • Minneapolis, Minnesota	Fox 9, BTN+	Close	L 2–4	9,741	5–4–2 (1–3–1)
November 18	7:00 pm	#17 Notre Dame	#6	3M Arena at Mariucci • Minneapolis, Minnesota	Fox 9+, BTN+	Close	W 4–1	9,538	6–4–2 (2–3–1)
November 24	7:00 pm	#7 Michigan State	#8	3M Arena at Mariucci • Minneapolis, Minnesota	Fox 9+, BTN+	Close	T 3–3 ^{SOL}	10,392	6–4–3 (2–3–2)
November 26	1:00 pm	#7 Michigan State	#8	3M Arena at Mariucci • Minneapolis, Minnesota	BTN	Close	W 6–5 ^{OT}	8,494	7–4–3 (3–3–2)
December 1	5:00 pm	at #18 Penn State	#7	Pegula Ice Arena • University Park, Pennsylvania	BTN+	Close	W 4–1	6,300	8–4–3 (4–3–2)
December 2	5:00 pm	at #18 Penn State	#7	Pegula Ice Arena • University Park, Pennsylvania	BTN	Close	L 3–6	6,421	8–5–3 (4–4–2)
December 8	5:30 pm	at Ohio State	#10	Value City Arena • Columbus, Ohio	BTN	Close	W 5–4	4,376	9–5–3 (5–4–2)
December 9	7:00 pm	at Ohio State	#10	Value City Arena • Columbus, Ohio	BTN	Close	T 1–1 ^{SOL}	4,140	9–5–4 (5–4–3)
January 1	2:00 pm	USNTDP*	#9	3M Arena at Mariucci • Minneapolis, Minnesota (Exhibition)	BTN+	Airey	W 3–2	10,095	
January 7	5:00 pm	#20 Colorado College*	#10	3M Arena at Mariucci • Minneapolis, Minnesota	Fox 9+, BTN+	Close	L 4–6	9,490	9–6–4
January 8	7:00 pm	#17 Colorado College*	#12	3M Arena at Mariucci • Minneapolis, Minnesota	Fox 9+, BTN+	Close	W 6–2	7,369	10–6–4
January 12	7:00 pm	Robert Morris*	#12	3M Arena at Mariucci • Minneapolis, Minnesota	Fox 9+, BTN+	Airey	W 4–2	8,449	11–6–4
January 13	5:00 pm	Robert Morris*	#12	3M Arena at Mariucci • Minneapolis, Minnesota	Fox 9+, BTN+	Close	W 4–1	9,475	12–6–4
January 19	7:00 pm	Ohio State	#10	3M Arena at Mariucci • Minneapolis, Minnesota	Fox 9, BTN+	Close	W 5–2	10,037	13–6–4 (6–4–3)
January 20	7:00 pm	Ohio State	#10	3M Arena at Mariucci • Minneapolis, Minnesota	BTN	Close	W 6–3	9,594	14–6–4 (7–4–3)
January 26	5:00 pm	at #8 Michigan State	#9	Munn Ice Arena • East Lansing, Michigan	BTN+	Close	L 2–3	6,555	14–7–4 (7–5–3)
January 27	3:00 pm	at #8 Michigan State	#9	Munn Ice Arena • East Lansing, Michigan	BTN	Close	W 5–1	6,555	15–7–4 (8–5–3)
February 2	7:00 pm	at #4 Wisconsin	#9	Kohl Center • Madison, Wisconsin (Rivalry)	BTN+	Close	W 2–1 ^{OT}	13,498	16–7–4 (9–5–3)
February 3	7:00 pm	at #4 Wisconsin	#9	Kohl Center • Madison, Wisconsin (Rivalry)	BTN+	Close	T 1–1 ^{SOL}	15,359	16–7–5 (9–5–4)
February 9	6:00 pm	Penn State	#8	3M Arena at Mariucci • Minneapolis, Minnesota	FS1	Close	W 3–0	10,750	17–7–5 (10–5–4)
February 10	3:00 pm	Penn State	#8	3M Arena at Mariucci • Minneapolis, Minnesota	BTN	Close	W 3–0	10,560	18–7–5 (11–5–4)
February 16	6:30 pm	Notre Dame	#8	Compton Family Ice Arena • Notre Dame, Indiana	Peacock	Close	L 1–6	5,264	18–8–5 (11–6–4)
February 17	5:00 pm	Notre Dame	#8	Compton Family Ice Arena • Notre Dame, Indiana	Peacock	Close	W 3–2 ^{OT}	5,326	19–8–5 (12–6–4)
March 1	7:30 pm	#16 Michigan	#8	3M Arena at Mariucci • Minneapolis, Minnesota (Rivalry)	BTN	Close	W 6–2	9,854	20–8–5 (13–6–4)
March 2	7:30 pm	#16 Michigan	#8	3M Arena at Mariucci • Minneapolis, Minnesota (Rivalry)	BTN	Airey	L 5–6 ^{OT}	10,564	20–9–5 (13–7–4)
Big Ten Tournament
March 8	6:00 pm	Penn State*	#8	3M Arena at Mariucci • Minneapolis, Minnesota (Quarterfinal Game 1)	FS2	Close	W 5–1	4,296	21–9–5
March 9	3:30 pm	Penn State*	#8	3M Arena at Mariucci • Minneapolis, Minnesota (Quarterfinal Game 2)	FS2	Close	W 3–2	5,363	22–9–5
March 16	8:00 pm	#11 Michigan*	#6	3M Arena at Mariucci • Minneapolis, Minnesota (Semifinal)	BTN	Close	L 1–2	10,336	22–10–5
NCAA Tournament
March 28	7:30 pm	vs. #11 Omaha*	#7	Denny Sanford PREMIER Center • Sioux Falls, South Dakota (West Regional Semifinal)	ESPNU	Close	W 3–2	5,691	23–10–5
March 28	5:30 pm	vs. #2 Boston University*	#7	Denny Sanford PREMIER Center • Sioux Falls, South Dakota (West Regional Final)	ESPNU	Close	L 3–6	6,113	23–11–5
*Non-conference game. ^{#}Rankings from USCHO.com Poll. All times are in Central Time. Source:

== NCAA tournament ==
=== Regional semifinal ===
March 28, 2024; 7:30 pm	(2) Minnesota	3–2 (0–0, 1–1, 2–1)	(3) Omaha	Denny Sanford Premier Center; Attendance: 5,691

Game reference

Justen Close
Goalies
Simon Latkoczy
Referees:
Jeremy Tufts
Terrence Murphy
Linesmen:
Steven Murray
Jeff McCorkle

	0–1	21:51 – PP – Joaquim Lemay (5) (Guévin, Bremer)
(Kurth) Jimmy Clark (5) – 38:01	1–1
	1–2	44:28 – Ty Mueller (4) (Randl, Lemay)
(Brodzinski) Jaxon Nelson (17) – 49:15	2–2
(Brodzinski) Jaxon Nelson (18) – GW – 55:47	3–2

9 min
Penalties
4 min
39
Shots
36

=== Regional final ===
March 30, 2024; 5:30 pm	(1) Boston University	6–3 (1–2, 3–1, 2–0)	(2) Minnesota	Denny Sanford Premier Center; Attendance: 6,113

Game reference

Mathieu Caron
Goalies
Justen Close
Referees:
Cameron Lynch
Jason Williams
Linesmen:
Steve Drain
John Rey

	0–1	7:19 – Jaxon Nelson (19) (Brodzinski, Rinzel)
	0–2	17:47 – Bryce Brodzinski (14) (Pitlick)
(unassisted) Quinn Hutson (18) – 18:01	1–2
(M. Celebrini, Harvey) Shane Lachance (13) – 21:17	2–2
(M. Celebrini, Lachance) Jack Harvey (7) – 25:25	3–2
	3–3	29:20 – Aaron Huglen (14) (Lamb, L. Mittelstadt)
(Peterson, C. McCarthy) Lane Hutson (15) – GW – 35:36	4–3
(Willander) Case McCarthy (4) – EN – 58:15	5–3
(M. Celebrini) Sam Stevens (10) – EN – 59:28	6–3

0 min
Penalties
0 min
38
Shots
28

Game summary
Boston University began the game on offense, getting several shots on Justen Close in the first few minutes. Minnesota's defense kept the Terriers from getting a great chance for a goal and then started matching BU's effort level. After several near-misses, the Gophers finally got their first shot just before the 5-minute mark. Shortly afterwards, Boston University set up for an extended period in the offensive zone and had several scoring chances but Close kept the game scoreless. Minnesota responded with an attack of their own and Jaxon Nelson twisted his body to fire a sharp-angle shot into the far corner of the goal for the opening score. The pace slowed down afterwards and little occurred over the next several minutes. Coming out of the TV timeout, Minnesota won a defensive zone faceoff and moved the puck up the ice. BU was first on the rubber but they turned the puck over and the Gophers got two great shots on goal. A minute later, the Terriers got their own high-percentage shot after a turnover but Sam Stevens could not get the puck into the goal. The near-miss appeared to reawaken Boston University and the Terriers got back to the same pace they had at the start of the period. The Gopher defense soon recovered and shut down a pair of Terrier rushes. Near the end of the period, Aaron Huglen forced Case McCarthy into a turnover along the wall. The puck was quickly moved to Bryce Brodzinski who shot the puck past Mathieu Caron's glove. After the ensuing faceoff, Quinn Hutson brought puck up the right side into the Minnesota zone and directed the puck towards the Gopher cage. The slow-motion puck seemed to catch Close off-guard and somehow slipped beneath the netminder's pad and was directed into the goal. The Gophers attacked after the fluky goal and were nearly able to regain their 2-goal edge but Caron made several saves to keep his team within one.

After the start of the second, BU wasted little time in getting to the offense. Macklin Celebrini grabbed the puck at the Minnesota blueline and skated to the right faceoff circle. He wheeled around a found a wide-open Shane Lachance at the left circle for a one-timer. Meanwhile, a Minnesota player ended up sliding into Justen Close and prevented the goaltender from getting into position. This allowed the shot from Lachance to easily sail into the net for the tying goal. The Terriers kept the pressure on and, four minutes later, Celebrini made another pass from the right side of the Gopher cage that ended up in the back of the net, this time to Jack Harvey. BU completely dominated the first seven minutes of the period but Minnesota finally got back into the game in the middle of the period. During an extended stay in the Terriers' end, Caron was forced to made several grade-A saves. The Gophers were able to make a line change and keep the pressure until a shot from Brody Lamb from the right circle. After sliding to his left, Caron was out of the crease as the puck settled in the blue paint. Aaron Huglen found the biscuit at his feet and was able to slap it into the net. In the second half of the period, Jaxon Nelson got a clean break in on the BU cage. While Caron made the save, the puck stayed with Minnesota and the Terrier netminder was forced to make several more stops. BU slowly got back to their game afterwards and continued the see-saw nature of the game. With less than five minutes in the period, Lane Hutson got the puck inside the Minnesota blueline and, after evading a Minnesota defender, skated in an arc down the left side and fired the puck towards the goal. He was apparently trying to find Sam Stevens, who was set up in the goal crease, but the puck hit Close in the left pad and was redirected into the goal. Minnesota took over in the waning minutes and got a good chance on goal but Caron made the save.

Minnesota took the initiative at the start of the third and Nelson had a chance to tie the score just 30 seconds in. BU evened out play afterwards and the two teams exchanged scoring chances. Neither team was able to establish a presence in the offensive zone for any length of time, however, and both teams were limited to end-to-end rushes. The Terriers finally got set up near the middle of the period but the Gopher defense kept them mostly to the outside. Minnesota counterattacked and got a few chances of their own but they too were checked closely by Boston University. In the later half of the period, Macklin Celebrini made a third miraculous pass from the right side but this time the shot was stopped by Close. As the play continued, the puck came back to Celebrini but the teenager caught an edge and Minnesota broke up the ice on a 2-on-1. Nelson passed the puck to Ryan Chesley but he fanned on the shot. About a minute later, Hughes got the puck near the Minnesota goal line and had a partially open net to shoot at but he couldn't overcome the steep angle. Both teams remained on an offensive footing and scoring chances were coming from all quarters. After BU iced the puck with about 2 two minutes to play, Close was pulled for an extra attacker. Minnesota could not get set up in the offensive zone and after their second attempt, Case McCarthy cleared the puck 200 feet into the Minnesota cage for a 2-goal lead. With no other option, Close was pulled again and minute later, Macklin Celebrini chipped the puck out of the zone to Sam Stevens and the second empty-net goal sealed the win for BU.

== Scoring statistics ==
Name	Position	Games	Goals	Assists	Points	PIM
Rhett Pitlick	LW	39	19	17	36	14
Bryce Brodzinski	RW	39	14	22	36	18
Jimmy Snuggerud	RW	39	21	13	34	42
Oliver Moore	C	39	9	24	33	8
Jaxon Nelson	C	39	19	12	31	6
Sam Rinzel	D	39	2	26	28	20
Brody Lamb	RW	39	12	15	27	6
Aaron Huglen	C/W	37	13	8	21	21
Connor Kurth	F	37	7	14	21	14
Luke Mittelstadt	D	38	2	18	20	14
Mason Nevers	C	35	3	12	15	12
Michael Koster	D	33	2	12	14	4
Jimmy Clark	C/LW	39	5	6	11	4
Cal Thomas	D	38	1	9	10	8
Ryan Chesley	D	39	2	6	8	19
Justen Close	G	38	0	4	4	0
Charlie Strobel	C	29	2	1	3	17
Garrett Pinoniemi	C	35	1	2	3	2
Carl Fish	D	38	0	3	3	15
John Mittelstadt	F	33	1	1	2	6
Nathan Airey	G	3	0	0	0	0
Axel Begley	D	14	0	0	0	0
Max Rud	D	20	0	0	0	0
Total			135	225	360	256

== Goaltending statistics ==
Name	Games	Minutes	Wins	Losses	Ties	Goals against	Saves	Shut outs	SV %	GAA
Justen Close	38	2233:07	22	10	5	88	1052	4	.923	2.36
Nathan Airey	3	129:54	1	1	0	7	45	0	.865	3.23
Empty Net	-	11:12	-	-	-	5	-	-	-	-
Total	39	2374:13	23	11	5	100	1097	4	.916	2.53

== Rankings ==
Poll	Week																										
Poll	Pre	1	2	3	4	5	6	7	8	9	10	11	12	13	14	15	16	17	18	19	20	21	22	23	24	25	26 (Final)
USCHO.com	3 (10)	2 (18)	1 (33)	1 (42)	6	6	6	8	7	10	9	–	10	12	10	9	9	8	8	8	8	8	6	8	7	–	7
USA Hockey	2 (6)	1 (17)	1 (23)	1 (33)	6	5	6	8	6	9	9	9	–	11	10	9	9	9	7	8	8	8	6	8	7	7	7

Note: USCHO did not release a poll in weeks 11 or 25.
Note: USA Hockey did not release a poll in week 12.

== Awards and honors ==
Player	Award	Ref
Jimmy Snuggerud	Big Ten First Team	
Ryan Chesley	Big Ten Second Team	
Sam Rinzel	Big Ten Second Team	
Rhett Pitlick	Big Ten Second Team	
Sam Rinzel	Big Ten Freshman Team	
Oliver Moore	Big Ten Freshman Team	

== 2024 NHL entry draft ==
Round	Pick	Player	NHL team
3	71	Brodie Ziemer ^{†}	Buffalo Sabres
4	112	Javon Moore ^{†}	Ottawa Senators
5	144	John Whipple ^{†}	Detroit Red Wings
7	213	Erik Pahlsson ^{†}	Nashville Predators

† incoming freshman
