= Josh Eernisse =

Canadian ice hockey player (born 2001)

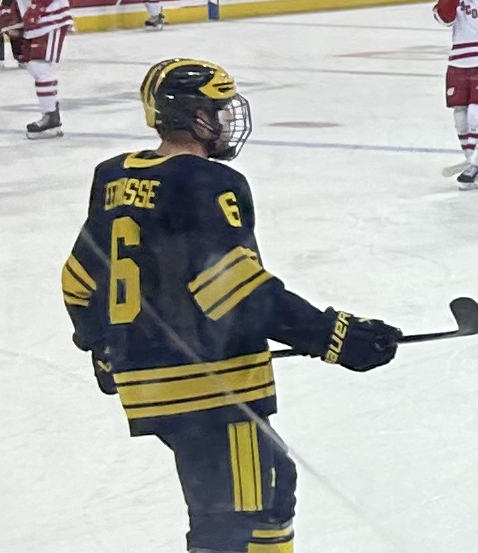
- Eernisse with Michigan in November 2023
- Born: December 31, 2001 (age 24) Apple Valley, Minnesota, U.S.
- Height: 6 ft 3 in (191 cm)
- Weight: 216 lb (98 kg; 15 st 6 lb)
- Position: Forward
- Shoots: Right
- NHL team (P) Cur. team: Columbus Blue Jackets; Cleveland Monsters (AHL)
- NHL draft: Undrafted
- Playing career: 2026–present

Joshua Eernisse (born December 31, 2001) is an American professional ice hockey forward for the Cleveland Monsters of the American Hockey League (AHL), while under contract to the Columbus Blue Jackets of the National Hockey League (NHL). He played college ice hockey at St. Thomas and Michigan.

== Playing career ==
=== Junior ===
Eernisse played two seasons with the Tri-City Storm of the United States Hockey League (USHL). He made his USHL debut on November 7, 2020, in a game the Sioux City Musketeers.

=== College ===
On October 26, 2021, Eernisse committed to play college ice hockey for St. Thomas. During the 2022–23 season, in his freshman year, he recorded 14 goals and seven assists in 36 games.

On June 1, 2023, he transferred to Michigan. During the 2023–24 season, in his sophomore year, he recorded eight goals and six assists in 41 games. During the 2024–25 season, in his junior year, he recorded one goal and ten assists in 36 games. During the 2025–26 season, in his senior year, he recorded 11 goals and eight assists in 38 games.

=== Professional ===
On April 12, 2026, Eernisse signed a one-year, entry-level contract with the Columbus Blue Jackets for the 2026–27 NHL season. He was assigned to the Blue Jackets' AHL affiliate, the Cleveland Monsters, on a professional tryout (PTO) contract for the remainder of the 2025–26 AHL season.

== Personal life ==
Eernisse was born to Mark and Michele Eernisse, and has a sister, Alexandra. His sister is a member of the Iowa rowing team.

== Career statistics ==
			Regular season					Playoffs
Season	Team	League	GP	G	A	Pts	PIM	GP	G	A	Pts	PIM
2020–21	Tri-City Storm	USHL	33	1	6	7	16	1	0	0	0	4
2021–22	Tri-City Storm	USHL	52	9	8	17	57	5	1	0	1	4
2022–23	University of St. Thomas	CCHA	36	14	7	21	54	—	—	—	—	—
2023–24	University of Michigan	B1G	41	8	6	4	45	—	—	—	—	—
2024–25	University of Michigan	B1G	36	1	10	11	34	—	—	—	—	—
2025–26	University of Michigan	B1G	38	11	8	19	37	—	—	—	—	—
2025–26	Cleveland Monsters	AHL	1	0	0	0	0	—	—	—	—	—
NCAA totals			151	34	31	65	170	—	—	—	—	—
