= Marshall Warren =

American ice hockey player (born 2001)

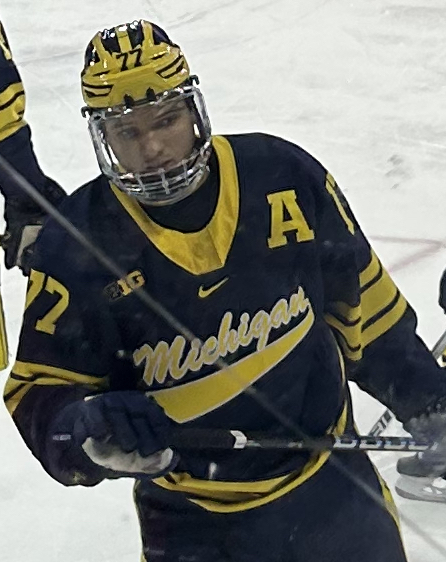
- Warren with Michigan in November 2023
- Born: April 20, 2001 (age 25) Laurel Hollow, New York, U.S.
- Height: 5 ft 11 in (180 cm)
- Weight: 195 lb (88 kg; 13 st 13 lb)
- Position: Defense
- Shoots: Left
- NHL team (P) Cur. team: New York Islanders; Hamilton Hammers (AHL)
- NHL draft: 166th overall, 2019; Minnesota Wild
- Playing career: 2024–present

Marshall Warren (born April 20, 2001) is an American professional ice hockey player who is a defenseman for the Hamilton Hammers of the American Hockey League (AHL) while under contract to the New York Islanders of the National Hockey League (NHL). He played college ice hockey at Boston College and Michigan.

== Early life ==
Warren was born to Lewis and Lisa Warren. He began figure skating at three years old before transitioning to ice hockey. His sister, Arielle, was a figure skater at Boston University. Warren attended Green Vale School in Glen Head Long Island.

== Playing career ==
=== Junior ===
Warren spent two seasons with the USA Hockey National Team Development Program (USNTDP). During the 2017–18 season, he recorded eight goals and 22 assists 60 games for the under-17 team. During the 2018–19 season, he recorded eight goals and 26 assists in 58 games, for the under-18 team. He drafted in the sixth round, 166th overall, by the Minnesota Wild in the 2019 NHL entry draft.

=== College ===
Warren began his collegiate career for Boston College during the 2019–20 season. In his freshman year he recorded six goals and five assists in 34 games and helped the Eagles win the Hockey East regular season championship. On October 11, 2019, he scored first career goal in his NCAA debut in a game against Wisconsin. He ranked second in Hockey East among rookie defensemen in goals, and led all freshmen defensemen in the league with a +22 rating. During the 2020–21 season, in his sophomore year, he recorded three goals and eight assists in 23 games. During the 2021–22 season, in his junior year, he six goals and 15 assists in 37 games. During the first round of the 2022 Hockey East tournament against New Hampshire, he assisted on the game-winning overtime goal by Marc McLaughlin. He was named captain for the 2022–23 season, becoming the first black player to serve as captain in program history. In his senior year he recorded five goals and nine assists in 36 games.

On March 27, 2023, Warren entered the NCAA transfer portal. He finished his career at Boston College with 20 goals and 37 assists in 130 games. On April 14, 2023, he transferred to Michigan for his final year of eligibility. He was named an alternate captain for the 2023–24 season. During his graduate student year, he recorded four goals and 14 assists in 41 games.

=== Professional ===
On April 16, 2024, Warren signed a two-year, entry-level contract with the New York Islanders. He was assigned to New York's AHL affiliate, the Bridgeport Islanders, for the remainder of the 2023–24 AHL season on an amateur tryout (ATO). He was scoreless in two games with Bridgeport. During the 2024–25 season, in his first full professional year in the AHL, he recorded four goals and 13 assists in 53 games with Bridgeport. He began the 2025–26 season in Bridgeport and recorded three goals and two assists in four games. On October 23, 2025, he was recalled by the New York Islanders.

On June 5, 2026, Warren was re-signed to a one-year, two-way contract by the Islanders.

== International play ==
Medal record

Men's ice hockey

Representing the United States

World U18 Championship
Bronze medal – third place	2019 Sweden	

Warren represented the United States at the 2019 World U18 Championships, where he served as alternate captain and recorded three assists in seven games and won a bronze medal.

== Career statistics ==
=== Regular season and playoffs ===
			Regular season					Playoffs
Season	Team	League	GP	G	A	Pts	PIM	GP	G	A	Pts	PIM
2017–18	U.S. National Development Team	USHL	34	5	13	18	18	—	—	—	—	—
2018–19	U.S. National Development Team	USHL	26	4	9	13	10	—	—	—	—	—
2019–20	Boston College	HE	34	6	5	11	22	—	—	—	—	—
2020–21	Boston College	HE	23	3	8	11	27	—	—	—	—	—
2021–22	Boston College	HE	37	6	15	21	12	—	—	—	—	—
2022–23	Boston College	HE	36	5	9	14	12	—	—	—	—	—
2023–24	University of Michigan	B1G	41	4	14	18	30	—	—	—	—	—
2023–24	Bridgeport Islanders	AHL	2	0	0	0	0	—	—	—	—	—
2024–25	Bridgeport Islanders	AHL	53	4	13	17	38	—	—	—	—	—
2025–26	Bridgeport Islanders	AHL	56	6	26	32	30	2	0	1	1	2
2025–26	New York Islanders	NHL	8	0	3	3	4	—	—	—	—	—
NHL totals			8	0	3	3	4	—	—	—	—	—

=== International ===
Year	Team	Event	Result	GP	G	A	Pts	PIM
2017	United States	U17	1st place, gold medalist(s)	6	0	1	1	4
2019	United States	U18	3rd place, bronze medalist(s)	7	0	3	3	2
Junior totals				13	0	4	4	6
