= Seamus Casey (ice hockey) =

American ice hockey player (born 2004)

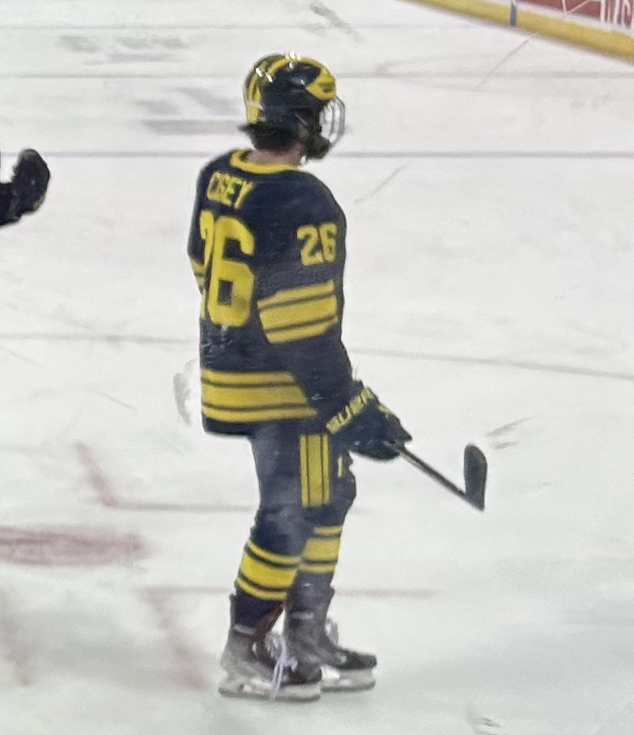
- Casey with the Michigan Wolverines in 2023
- Born: January 8, 2004 (age 22) Miami, Florida, U.S.
- Height: 5 ft 10 in (178 cm)
- Weight: 181 lb (82 kg; 12 st 13 lb)
- Position: Defense
- Shoots: Right
- NHL team (P) Cur. team: New Jersey Devils; Utica Comets (AHL)
- NHL draft: 46th overall, 2022; New Jersey Devils
- Playing career: 2024–present

Seamus Casey (born January 8, 2004) is an American professional ice hockey player who is a defenseman for the Utica Comets of the American Hockey League (AHL) as a prospect to the New Jersey Devils of the National Hockey League (NHL). He was drafted in the second round, 46th overall, by the Devils in the 2022 NHL entry draft.

== Early life ==
Casey was born in Miami on January 8, 2004, to Steve and Karen Casey. When he was around the age of five the family moved to Fort Myers, Florida, where he met future Columbus Blue Jackets draft pick Gavin Brindley, who became a close friend and with whom he would play youth, junior, and collegiate ice hockey.

At twelve, Casey moved to Detroit to play for the Compuware Youth Hockey AAA program.

== Playing career ==
=== Youth and junior ===
Casey was scouted by the University of Michigan while playing for Compuware, at a game in which he was moved to forward due to injuries. He committed to Michigan in October 2018.

Casey was drafted by the Sarnia Sting of the Ontario Hockey League (OHL), but elected instead to play for the USA Hockey National Team Development Program (NTDP). Had he chose to enter the OHL, he would have voided his NCAA eligibility.

In the 2020–21 season with the NTDP, Casey's 36 points and 28 assists in 48 games ranked first among U17 team defensemen.

Returning to the NTDP for the 2021–22 season, he scored 33 points in 48 games, second among defensemen on the U18 team behind Lane Hutson. He was chosen as one of the top draft-eligible junior players in the United States to attend the 2023 USA Hockey All-American Game. After the season, he was selected in the second round of the 2022 NHL entry draft, 46th overall by the New Jersey Devils, the team he supported as a child.

=== Collegiate ===
Making good on his commitment to Michigan, Casey joined fellow Devils draftees Luke Hughes and Ethan Edwards on the Wolverines for the 2022–23 season. He scored a respectable 29 points in 37 games, second to Hughes among Michigan defensemen, and played one game at center, an exhibition match against the NTDP in which he had two goals and an assist. Michigan won the Big Ten Conference, but lost in the semifinals of the 2023 Frozen Four to the eventual champions, Quinnipiac University.

In his sophomore season, the 2023–24 season, Casey recorded seven goals and 45 points in 39 games, earning All-Big Ten First Team and First Team All-American honors. For the second straight year, Michigan won the Big Ten only to be eliminated in the Frozen Four semifinals by Boston College.

=== Professional ===
Casey turned professional on May 6, 2024, after signing a three-year, entry-level contract with the Devils. To start the 2024–25 season and in part because of injuries to Brett Pesce and Luke Hughes, he made the Devils' opening night roster out of training camp, traveling to Prague for a season-opening two-game series against the Buffalo Sabres as part of the 2024 NHL Global Series. He made his NHL debut on October 4, 2024, a 3–1 Devils win, and scored his first NHL goal the following day, tying the game on the power play in the second period of the 4–1 Devils victory. Ten days later, in a 3–0 victory over the Utah Hockey Club, he would record three more career firsts: his first assist and game-winning goal for his first multi-point game.

== International play ==
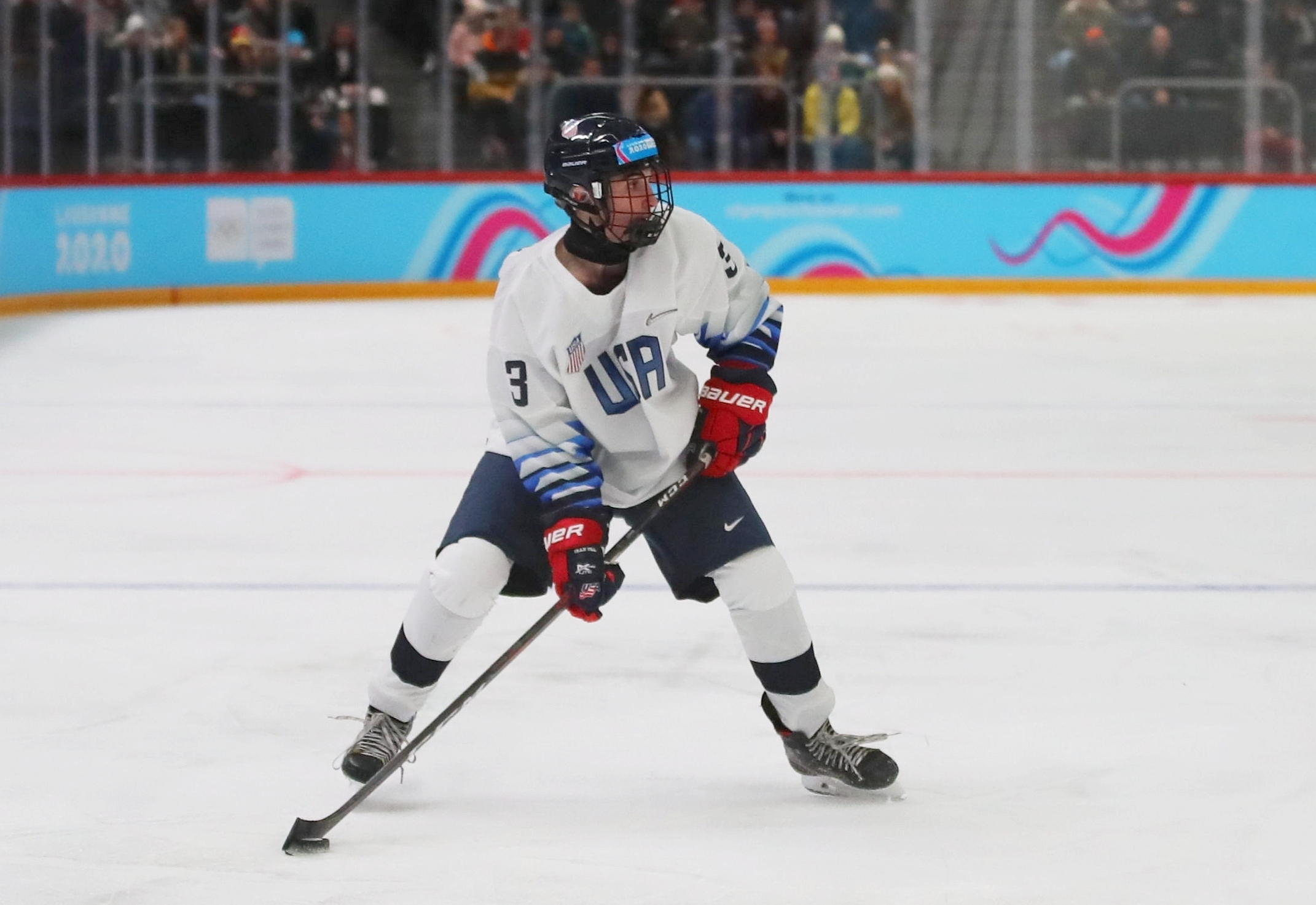
- Casey at the 2020 Winter Youth Olympics

Medal record

Representing United States

Men's ice hockey

World Junior Championships
Gold medal – first place	2024 Sweden	
Bronze medal – third place	2023 Canada	

World U18 Championships
Silver medal – second place	2022 Germany	

Youth Olympic Games
Silver medal – second place	2020 Lausanne	

In his lone under-18 tournament appearance, Casey represented the United States at the 2022 IIHF World U18 Championships, scoring six points in as many games.

Casey traveled with Team USA to the 2023 IIHF World Junior Championship, but did not dress for any games. Michigan teammate and fellow Devils draftee Luke Hughes also attended the tournament. The following year, however, at the 2024 World Junior Ice Hockey Championships, he would be rostered, and would record six assists in six games en route to a gold medal. He missed one game due to illness.

== Career statistics ==
=== Regular season and playoffs ===
			Regular season					Playoffs
Season	Team	League	GP	G	A	Pts	PIM	GP	G	A	Pts	PIM
2020–21	U.S. National Development Team	USHL	30	2	18	20	8	—	—	—	—	—
2021–22	U.S. National Development Team	USHL	17	3	10	13	14	—	—	—	—	—
2022–23	University of Michigan	B1G	37	8	21	29	9	—	—	—	—	—
2023–24	University of Michigan	B1G	40	7	38	45	14	—	—	—	—	—
2024–25	New Jersey Devils	NHL	14	4	4	8	0	1	0	0	0	0
2024–25	Utica Comets	AHL	30	3	15	18	8	—	—	—	—	—
2025–26	New Jersey Devils	NHL	2	0	0	0	0	—	—	—	—	—
2025–26	Utica Comets	AHL	29	1	18	19	13	—	—	—	—	—
NHL totals			16	4	4	8	0	1	0	0	0	0

=== International ===
Year	Team	Event	Result	GP	G	A	Pts	PIM
2022	United States	U18	2nd place, silver medalist(s)	6	3	3	6	2
2024	United States	WJC	1st place, gold medalist(s)	6	0	6	6	2
Junior totals				12	3	9	12	4

== Awards and honors ==
Award	Year	Ref
College
All-Big Ten Freshman Team	2023	
Big Ten All-Tournament Team	2023, 2024	
All-Big Ten First Team	2024	
AHCA West First Team All-American	2024	
