= Dylan Duke =

American ice hockey player (born 2003)

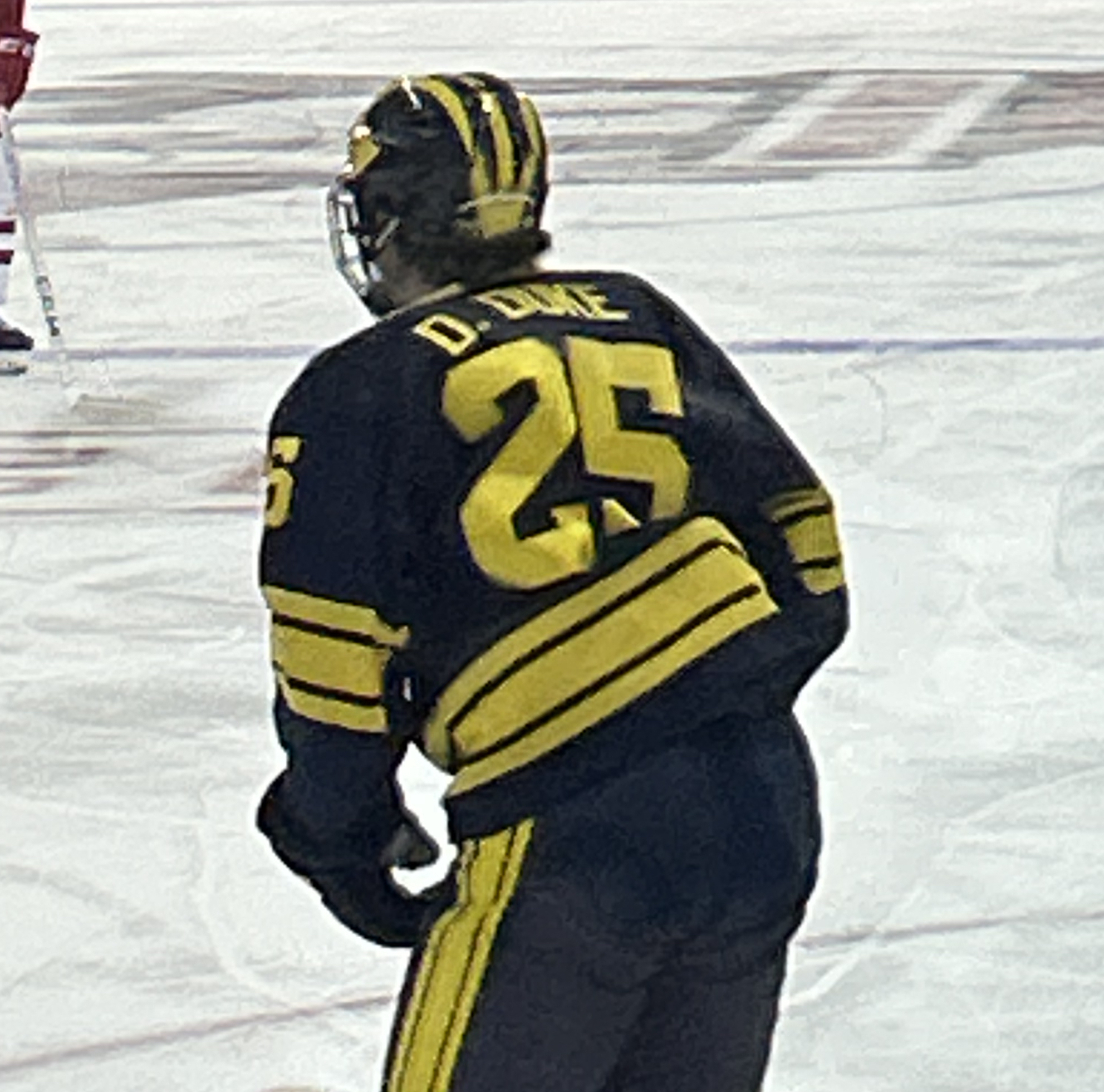
- Duke with the Michigan Wolverines in November 2023
- Born: March 4, 2003 (age 23) Strongsville, Ohio, U.S.
- Height: 5 ft 7 in (170 cm)
- Weight: 175 lb (79 kg; 12 st 7 lb)
- Position: Forward
- Shoots: Left
- NHL team (P) Cur. team: Tampa Bay Lightning; Syracuse Crunch (AHL)
- NHL draft: 126th overall, 2021; Tampa Bay Lightning
- Playing career: 2024–present

Dylan Duke (born March 4, 2003) is an American professional ice hockey player for the Syracuse Crunch of the American Hockey League (AHL), as a prospect for the Tampa Bay Lightning of the National Hockey League (NHL). He was drafted in the fourth round, 126th overall, by the Lightning in the 2021 NHL entry draft. He played college ice hockey at Michigan.

== Playing career ==
=== Junior ===
Duke spent two seasons with the USA Hockey National Team Development Program. During the 2019–20 season, he recorded 12 goals and 11 assists in 32 games. During the 2020–21 season, he recorded ten goals and seven assists in 26 games.

=== College ===
Duke began his collegiate career for the Michigan Wolverines during the 2021–22 season. In his freshman year he recorded ten goals and nine assists in 41 games. During the 2022–23 season, in his sophomore year, he recorded 18 goals and 14 assists in 41 games. During the regional finals at the 2023 NCAA Division I men's ice hockey tournament against Penn State, he recorded the assist on Mackie Samoskevich's game-winning overtime goal to help Michigan advance to the Frozen Four for the second consecutive year.

He was named an alternate captain for the 2023–24 season. In his junior year he recorded 26 goals and 23 assists in 41 games. He led the team with 26 goals and ranked third on the team in scoring with 49 points. During the regional semifinals at the 2024 NCAA Division I men's ice hockey tournament against North Dakota he scored two goals, including the game-winning goal. During the regional finals against Michigan State, he scored two goals and one assist, including the game-winning goal to help Michigan advance to the Frozen Four for the third consecutive year. He was subsequently named MVP of the NCAA Regional in Maryland Heights after his five-point performance. Following the season he was named to the All-Big Ten Second Team.

He finished his collegiate career with 54 goals and 46 assists in 123 games, and helped lead Michigan to back-to-back Big Ten Tournament championships in 2022 and 2023, and the NCAA Frozen Four all three seasons.

=== Professional ===
On April 15, 2024, Duke signed a three-year, entry-level contract with the Tampa Bay Lightning. He was assigned to the Lightning's AHL affiliate, the Syracuse Crunch, for the remainder of the 2023–24 AHL season on an amateur tryout (ATO).

Duke began the 2024–25 season with the Crunch, and recorded 13 goals and nine assists in 36 games. His 13 goals were tied for the sixth-most among all AHL rookies. On February 7, 2025, he was recalled by the Lightning. He made his NHL debut the next day in a game against the Detroit Red Wings. During the game he had 7:38 of ice time and scored his first career NHL goal in the third period against Cam Talbot.

== International play ==
Medal record

Representing United States

Ice hockey

World Junior Championships
Bronze medal – third place	2023 Canada	

Duke represented the United States at the 2021 IIHF World U18 Championships, where he recorded three goals and one assist in five games.

On December 12, 2022, Duke was named to the United States men's national junior ice hockey team to compete at the 2023 World Junior Ice Hockey Championships. During the tournament he recorded one goal and three assists in seven games and won a bronze medal.

== Personal life ==
Duke was born to Steve and Sharon Duke. His father played hockey at Western Michigan and in both the ECHL and AHL. He has two siblings, a sister, Alyssa, and a brother, Tyler. His brother began his college ice hockey career at Ohio State before transferring to Michigan after his freshman year.

== Career statistics ==
=== Regular season and playoffs ===
			Regular season					Playoffs
Season	Team	League	GP	G	A	Pts	PIM	GP	G	A	Pts	PIM
2019–20	U.S. National Development Team	USHL	32	12	11	23	22	—	—	—	—	—
2020–21	U.S. National Development Team	USHL	26	10	7	17	20	—	—	—	—	—
2021–22	University of Michigan	B1G	41	10	9	19	20	—	—	—	—	—
2022–23	University of Michigan	B1G	41	18	14	32	43	—	—	—	—	—
2023–24	University of Michigan	B1G	41	26	23	49	30	—	—	—	—	—
2023–24	Syracuse Crunch	AHL	3	0	0	0	0	5	0	2	2	2
2024–25	Syracuse Crunch	AHL	62	20	20	40	47	3	1	0	1	4
2024–25	Tampa Bay Lightning	NHL	2	1	0	1	0	—	—	—	—	—
2025–26	Syracuse Crunch	AHL	72	32	27	59	42	4	1	1	2	4
2025–26	Tampa Bay Lightning	NHL	1	0	0	0	0	—	—	—	—	—
NHL totals			3	1	0	1	0	—	—	—	—	—

=== International ===
Year	Team	Event	Result	GP	G	A	Pts	PIM
2021	United States	U18	5th	5	3	1	4	4
2023	United States	WJC	3rd place, bronze medalist(s)	7	1	3	4	4
Junior totals				12	4	4	8	8

== Awards and honours ==
Award	Year
College
All-Big Ten Second Team	2024
