= Jonny Brodzinski =

American ice hockey player (born 1993)

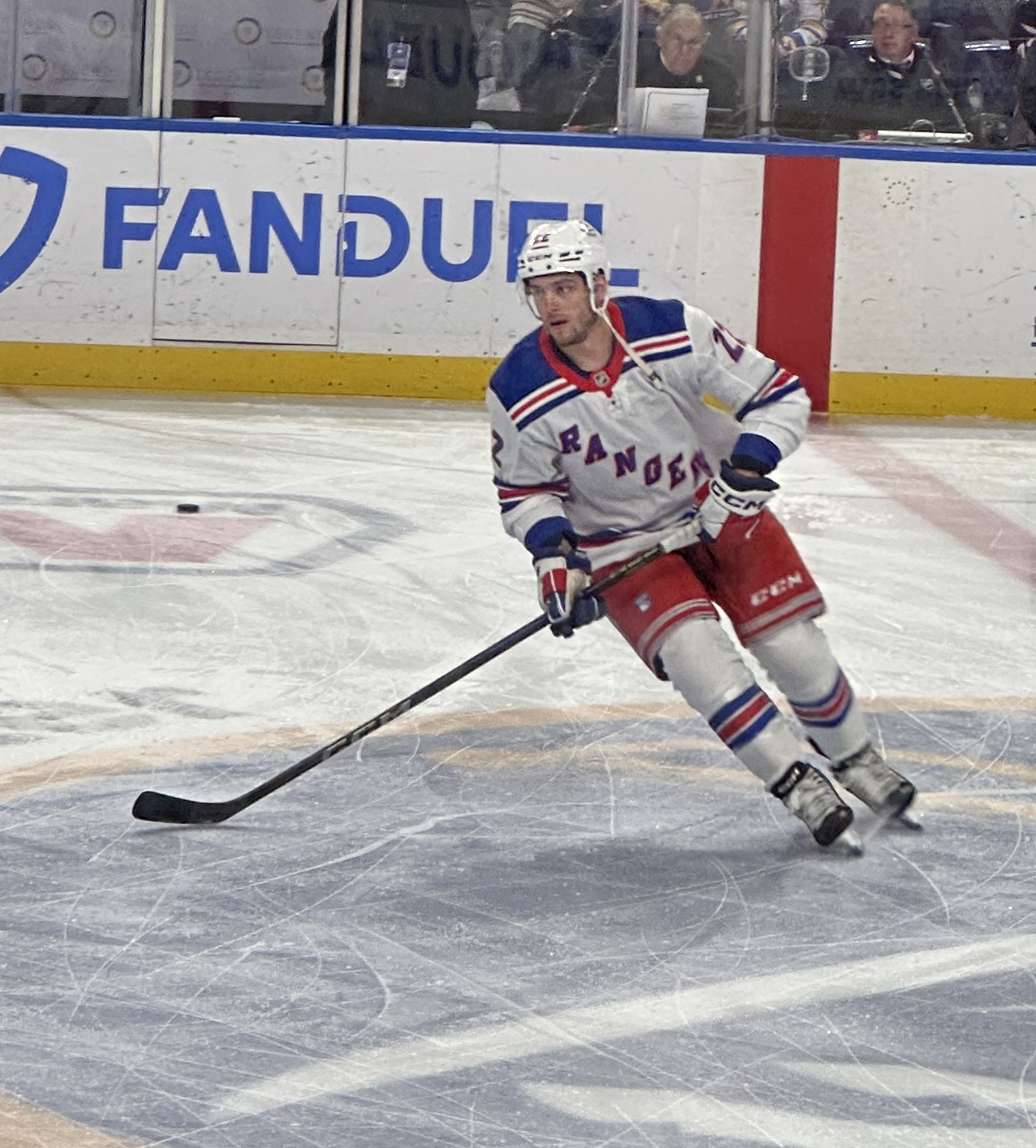
- Brodzinski with the New York Rangers in 2025
- Born: June 19, 1993 (age 33) Blaine, Minnesota, U.S.
- Height: 6 ft 1 in (185 cm)
- Weight: 215 lb (98 kg; 15 st 5 lb)
- Position: Forward
- Shoots: Right
- NHL team (P) Cur. team Former teams: Washington Capitals; Hershey Bears (AHL); Los Angeles Kings; San Jose Sharks; New York Rangers
- NHL draft: 148th overall, 2013; Los Angeles Kings
- Playing career: 2015–present

Jonathan Brodzinski (born June 19, 1993) is an American professional ice hockey player who is a forward for the Hershey Bears in the American Hockey League (AHL) while under contract to the Washington Capitals of the National Hockey League (NHL). Brodzinski was selected by the Los Angeles Kings in the fifth round (148th overall) of the 2013 NHL entry draft.

== Playing career ==
=== Amateur ===
Brodzinski attended Blaine High School where he was teammates with former Minnesota Wild center Nick Bjugstad. After high school, Brodzinski played two seasons in the United States Hockey League (USHL) with the Fargo Force.

Brodzinski attended St. Cloud State University where he skated three seasons with the Huskies. As a freshman he led all NCAA freshmen with 22 goals and as a junior he was named to the National Collegiate Hockey Conference (NCHC) All-Conference First Team during the 2014–15 season. He finished his college career with 64 goals and 48 assists for 112 points in 120 games played.

=== Professional ===
On April 1, 2015, the Los Angeles Kings signed Brodzinski to a two-year, entry-level contract. He was then assigned to the Kings American Hockey League (AHL) affiliate, the Ontario Reign.

On January 5, 2017, Brodzinski, and teammate Vincent LoVerde, were selected to compete in the 2017 AHL All-Star Game.

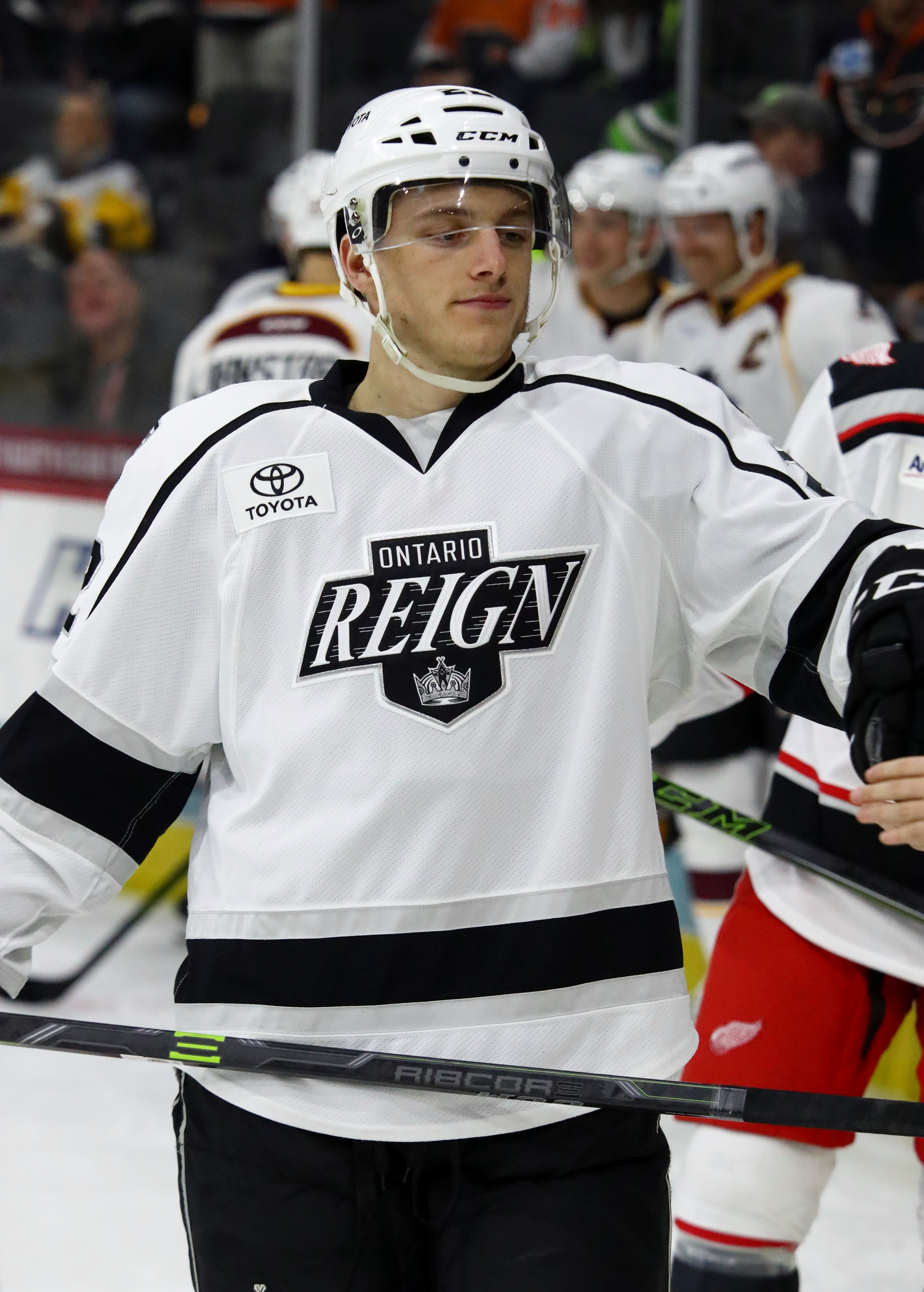
Brodzinski with the Ontario Reign in 2017

Brodzinski was called up to the Kings on March 23, 2017, and made his NHL debut on March 25, against the New York Rangers. When he debuted, he became the first Los Angeles Kings player to wear the number 76 and the first player who was part of the Kings' 2013 draft class to appear in a game for the team.

Brodzinski was recalled to the NHL on November 16, 2017. He scored his first NHL goal on November 18, in a 4–0 win against the Florida Panthers. On January 7, 2018, he was reassigned to the AHL only to be recalled on January 14, after playing three games in the AHL since he was last recalled. He was demoted again on January 25, only to be recalled temporarily on January 29, along with three other teammates.

As a free agent from the Kings, Brodzinski signed a one-year, two-way contract with the San Jose Sharks on July 2, 2019. After making the Sharks opening night roster for the 2019–20 season, he appeared in three games for the club before he was placed on waivers on October 11. Assigned to AHL affiliate, the San Jose Barracuda, Brodzinski tallied 14 goals and 16 assists for 30 points in 44 games before the season was cancelled due to the COVID-19 pandemic.

On October 9, 2020, Brodzinski left the West Coast as a free agent in securing a one-year, two-way contract with the New York Rangers. On April 19, 2021, he signed a one-year contract to remain with the Rangers. On February 28, 2022, he signed a two-year contract extension with the Rangers. He has since spent time both with the Rangers and with their AHL affiliate, the Hartford Wolf Pack. On February 21, 2024, the Rangers signed Brodzinski to a two-year contract extension.

After six seasons within the New York Rangers organization, Brodzinski left as a free agent and was signed to a one-year, $850,000 contract with the Washington Capitals for the 2026–27 on July 1, 2026.

== Personal life ==
Brodzinski's younger brother, Michael, was taken just seven selections before him in the same NHL draft by the San Jose Sharks. The two brothers competed against each other multiple times during college as Michael played for the University of Minnesota. Brodzinski also has two more younger brothers, Easton and Bryce. Easton plays for the Allen Americans of the ECHL after playing in college for St. Cloud State University, while Bryce, who was a seventh-round draft pick by the Philadelphia Flyers in 2019, plays for the Ontario Reign of the American Hockey League after playing in college for the University of Minnesota. Bryce was also named 2019 Mr. Hockey for Minnesota High School Hockey.

Brodzinski also plays in The “Da Beauty League” In the off-season.

== Career statistics ==
			Regular season					Playoffs
Season	Team	League	GP	G	A	Pts	PIM	GP	G	A	Pts	PIM
2009–10	Blaine High	MNHS	30	22	26	48	18	5	0	6	6	0
2010–11	Blaine High	MNHS	30	31	29	60	18	5	4	4	8	2
2010–11	Fargo Force	USHL	10	2	3	5	2	2	0	0	0	0
2011–12	Fargo Force	USHL	58	10	12	22	18	6	1	1	2	0
2012–13	St. Cloud State	WCHA	42	22	11	33	10	—	—	—	—	—
2013–14	St. Cloud State	NCHC	38	21	20	41	16	—	—	—	—	—
2014–15	St. Cloud State	NCHC	40	21	17	38	49	—	—	—	—	—
2015–16	Ontario Reign	AHL	65	15	13	28	16	4	2	1	3	2
2016–17	Ontario Reign	AHL	59	27	22	49	12	5	2	2	4	2
2016–17	Los Angeles Kings	NHL	6	0	2	2	2	—	—	—	—	—
2017–18	Los Angeles Kings	NHL	35	4	2	6	6	—	—	—	—	—
2017–18	Ontario Reign	AHL	29	13	17	30	18	4	1	2	3	2
2018–19	Ontario Reign	AHL	3	1	0	1	2	—	—	—	—	—
2018–19	Los Angeles Kings	NHL	13	2	1	3	2	—	—	—	—	—
2019–20	San Jose Sharks	NHL	3	0	1	1	0	—	—	—	—	—
2019–20	San Jose Barracuda	AHL	44	14	16	30	26	—	—	—	—	—
2020–21	New York Rangers	NHL	5	1	0	1	4	—	—	—	—	—
2020–21	Hartford Wolf Pack	AHL	14	6	11	17	8	—	—	—	—	—
2021–22	Hartford Wolf Pack	AHL	36	18	21	39	34	—	—	—	—	—
2021–22	New York Rangers	NHL	22	1	1	2	10	1	0	0	0	2
2022–23	Hartford Wolf Pack	AHL	47	21	27	48	39	5	1	1	2	0
2022–23	New York Rangers	NHL	17	1	1	2	8	—	—	—	—	—
2023–24	Hartford Wolf Pack	AHL	16	11	14	25	4	—	—	—	—	—
2023–24	New York Rangers	NHL	57	6	13	19	8	3	0	0	0	0
2024–25	New York Rangers	NHL	51	12	7	19	4	—	—	—	—	—
2025–26	New York Rangers	NHL	55	6	10	16	12	—	—	—	—	—
NHL totals			264	33	38	71	56	4	0	0	0	2

== Awards and honors ==
Award	Year	Ref
College
NCHC All-Conference First Team	2015	
AHL
All-Star Game	2017	
