= Jaxon Nelson =

American ice hockey player (born 2000)

- Nelson playing for the University of Minnesota Golden Gophers in February 2024
- Born: March 30, 2000 (age 26) Magnolia, Minnesota, United States
- Height: 6 ft 4 in (193 cm)
- Weight: 220 lb (100 kg; 15 st 10 lb)
- Position: Center
- Shoots: Right
- AHL team Former teams: Free agent Providence Bruins; Iowa Wild
- NHL draft: Undrafted
- Playing career: 2024–present

Jaxon Nelson (born March 30, 2000), is an American professional ice hockey forward who is currently an unrestricted free agent. He most recently played for the Iowa Wild of the American Hockey League (AHL). He played college ice hockey for the Minnesota Golden Gophers men's ice hockey team.

== Playing career ==
=== High School ===
Jaxon Nelson played his high school hockey for Luverne High School in Luverne, Minnesota, where he had a prolific career, scoring over 290 points and ended up 5th overall in career points in the state of Minnesota before leaving to play for the Sioux Falls Stampede (USHL) for his senior high school season.

=== Collegiate ===
Nelson committed to play for the Minnesota Golden Gophers starting in the 2019–20 season, in his freshman year of high school. At the time of his commitment, Nelson was seen as one of the best high school prospects in Minnesota, even though he was only a freshman.

As a freshman, Nelson played in 33 games for the Golden Gophers. In those 33 games, he scored two goals and four assists for six total points. After helping Minnesota advance to the semifinals of the 2020 Big Ten Tournament over Notre Dame, Nelson and the Golden Gophers were set to play top seeded Penn State. However, their season would abruptly end after the Big Ten cancelled the tournament due to the COVID-19 pandemic. Later, the NCAA cancelled the rest of the season due to the pandemic as well.

Returning to action for the 2020–21 season, Nelson saw an uptick in his role and production with the Golden Gophers. In 31 games, Nelson scored five goals and ten assists for 15 points. He would then help the Golden Gophers win the 2021 Big Ten tournament, scoring a goal in the championship against the Wisconsin Badgers. The tournament victory gave Minnesota an automatic bid to the 2021 NCAA tournament. After a decisive 7–2 victory over Omaha in the first round, Nelson and the Golden Gophers would get shutout 4–0 by the Minnesota State Mavericks in the following round, ending their season.

Nelson missed 13 games of his junior season due to injury. However, despite this, he still posted solid numbers in his limited action, scoring six goals and four assists. He would once again help the Golden Gophers reach the finals 2022 Big Ten tournament, but the ending wasn't happy this time, as they fell 4–3 to the Michigan Wolverines. They would still secure an at-large bid to the 2022 NCAA tournament, and they would make the most of it. After defeating the defending champion UMass in the first round, a game in which Nelson would assist on the game-winning overtime winner, they then proceeded to shutout Western Michigan to proceed to the Frozen Four. Unfortunately, the Mavericks would once again end the Golden Gophers season, defeating them 5–1.

Nelson was named a captain of the Golden Gophers for his senior year. As a senior, he posted career highs in all categories, scoring 10 goals and 17 assists for 27 points in 40 games. Nelson once again led his team to the final round of the 2023 Big Ten tournament, Minnesota's third straight appearance in the finals. However, for the second consecutive season, the Golden Gophers would lose out on the Big Ten Championship to the Wolverines, losing 4–3. Despite this, the Golden Gophers once again made a deep run in the 2023 NCAA tournament, making it all the way to the championship round. They would dominate Canisius in the first round, beating them 9–2, then beat in-state rival St. Cloud State 4–1 before another dominating 6–2 win over Boston University in the Frozen Four to reach the final. In the final against Quinnipiac, Minnesota could not hold an early 2–0 lead and would fall 3–2 in overtime. In the run, Nelson had a point in every game in the tournament, with two goals and three assists, including a goal in the championship round.

Nelson announced that he would return to the Golden Gophers for a fifth and final season. Nelson was once again named a captain of the team for the 2023–24 season. Nelson would continue his statistical success with the Golden Gophers, scoring a career high 19 goals, and adding 12 assists for 31 total points in 39 games. However, déjà vu struck the Golden Gophers once again, as they would be eliminated by none other than the Wolverines in the semifinals of the 2024 Big Ten tournament, the third straight year such had happened. However, they would receive an at-large bid to the 2024 NCAA tournament for a third straight year as well, although this time, there wouldn't be a long run like the previous year. After a close 3–2 victory over Omaha which saw Nelson score two goals, including the game-tying and game-winning goals in the third period, Boston University would get their revenge on Nelson and the Golden Gophers in the following round, beating them 6-3 and ending their season. Nelson scored one goal in the loss, which would be his final collegiate game. Nelson's successful season had him named the recipient of the John Maruicci Award on April 30, 2024, given to the Golden Gopher's most valuable player.

=== Professional ===
On April 2, 2024, just three days after his collegiate career had ending, it was announced that Nelson had signed a one-year, $870,000 entry-level contract with the Boston Bruins. He would report to the Bruins AHL affiliate, the Providence Bruins, on an amateur tryout contract for the remainder of the 2023–24 season.

Nelson played in seven games with Providence in the 2023-24 season. He would score his first professional goal on April 14, 2024, against the Springfield Thunderbirds. It would be his only point of the season. The Bruins would face the Hartford Wolf Pack in the opening round of the 2024 Calder Cup playoffs, but would be eliminated in four games, in which Nelson did not register a point.

In his first full professional season, Nelson would struggle to generate offense with the Providence Bruins, ending up a healthy scratch for most of the regular season. In 35 games, he scored two goals and seven assists, and he would not play in any of the Bruins eight playoff games before they were eliminated by the Charlotte Checkers.

After the season, the Bruins announced they would not give Nelson a qualifying offer, making him an unrestricted free agent. After going un-signed through the opening month of free agency, Nelson was signed to a one-year ECHL contract with the Iowa Heartlanders on August 6, 2025.

Nelson began the 2025–26 season on a tear for the Heartlanders, and was named ECHL Player of the Month for October after scoring six goals and six assists in seven games. Nelson continued to play well through November, and eventually earned a call-up to the American Hockey League affiliate of the Heartlanders, the Iowa Wild, at the end of the month. Unfortunately Nelson would not be able to repeat his ECHL success in the AHL, and would only score two goals and two assists in 15 games before being sent back to the ECHL. After Nelson continued to produce at a high level with the Heartlanders, he was again called up to the AHL team in early April. Nelson would play a couple games with the Wild, going scoreless, before being sent back down to the Heartlanders, where he scored two goals in the final two games of the season.

== Career statistics ==
			Regular season					Playoffs
Season	Team	League	GP	G	A	Pts	PIM	GP	G	A	Pts	PIM
2016–17	Sioux Falls Stampede	USHL	54	7	11	18	12	—	—	—	—	—
2017–18	Sioux Falls Stampede	USHL	58	8	9	18	17	—	—	—	—	—
2018–19	Omaha Lancers	USHL	52	19	21	40	41	—	—	—	—	—
2019–20	University of Minnesota	B1G	33	2	4	6	2	—	—	—	—	—
2020–21	University of Minnesota	B1G	31	5	10	15	34	—	—	—	—	—
2021–22	University of Minnesota	B1G	26	6	4	10	17	—	—	—	—	—
2022–23	University of Minnesota	B1G	40	10	17	27	10	—	—	—	—	—
2023–24	University of Minnesota	B1G	39	19	12	31	6	—	—	—	—	—
2023–24	Providence Bruins	AHL	7	1	0	1	2	4	0	0	0	2
2024–25	Providence Bruins	AHL	35	2	7	9	8	—	—	—	—	—
2025–26	Iowa Heartlanders	ECHL	45	20	19	39	12	—	—	—	—	—
2025–26	Iowa Wild	AHL	19	2	2	4	4	—	—	—	—	—
AHL totals			61	5	9	14	14	4	0	0	0	2

== Awards and honors ==
Award	Year	Ref
College
All-Big Ten Honorable Mention	2024	
