= Garrett Schifsky =

American ice hockey player (born 2003)

- Born: April 8, 2003 (age 23) Andover, Minnesota, U.S.
- Height: 5 ft 9 in (175 cm)
- Weight: 186 lb (84 kg; 13 st 4 lb)
- Position: Forward
- Shoots: Right
- NCAA team: Michigan

Garrett Schifsky (born April 8, 2003) is an American college ice hockey forward for the Michigan Wolverines of the National Collegiate Athletic Association (NCAA).

== Early life ==
Schifsky attended Andover High School in Andover, Minnesota where he played ice hockey for three years, and helped lead the Huskies to consecutive section 7AA hockey championships and state finalists appearances in 2020 and 2021.

== Playing career ==
=== Junior ===
Schifsky spent two seasons with the Waterloo Black Hawks. During the 2020–21 season, he recorded two goals in eight games. On November 17, 2022, he was named an assistant captain for the 2021–22 season. On December 29, 2022, he was selected to compete at the 2023 BioSteel All-American Game. In his first full season with the team, he led the team in scoring and recorded 28 goals and 18 assists in 60 regular season games, and three goals and one assist in six games during the Clark Cup. On March 3, 2023, he was named captain for the Black Hawks. During the 2022–23 season, he again led the team in scoring and recorded 28 goals and 24 assists in 57 regular season games. He ranked second in the USHL with plus–minus of +33. Following the season he was named to the All-USHL Third Team, and voted team MVP by his teammates. He finished his junior career with 58 goals and 42 assists in 125 games, becoming the 27th Black Hawks player to surpass 100 career points.

=== College ===
Schifsky began his collegiate career for the Michigan Wolverines during the 2023–24 season. He scored his first career goal on October 13, 2023, in a game against Massachusetts. During his freshman year, he recorded 16 goals and 18 assists in 41 games. He ranked third in the Big Ten Conference in rookie scoring with 34 points. Following the season, he was named to the All-Big Ten Freshman Team.

During the 2024–25 season, in his sophomore year, he recorded 11 goals and nine assists in 36 games. On October 11, 2024, Schifsky scored his first career hat-trick in a game against Arizona State. Two of his three goals were short-handed goals. He became the first Michigan player with multiple short-handed goals in a game since Jack Johnson on January 26, 2007. During the 2025–26 season, in his junior year, he recorded 14 goals and 13 assists in 40 games.

He was named team captain for the 2026–27 season.

== Personal life ==
Schifsky was born to Tom and Holly Schifsky, and has two brothers Braxton and Keaton. His father played club hockey at the University of North Dakota, while his mother swam at North Dakota.

== Career statistics ==
			Regular season					Playoffs
Season	Team	League	GP	G	A	Pts	PIM	GP	G	A	Pts	PIM
2020–21	Waterloo Black Hawks	USHL	8	2	0	2	2	—	—	—	—	—
2021–22	Waterloo Black Hawks	USHL	60	28	18	46	32	6	3	1	4	6
2022–23	Waterloo Black Hawks	USHL	57	28	24	52	33	2	0	0	0	12
2023–24	University of Michigan	B1G	41	16	18	34	16	—	—	—	—	—
2024–25	University of Michigan	B1G	36	11	9	20	14	—	—	—	—	—
2025–26	University of Michigan	B1G	40	14	13	27	56	—	—	—	—	—
NCAA totals			117	41	40	81	86	—	—	—	—	—

== Awards and honors ==
Award	Year
USHL
All-USHL Third Team	2023
College
All-Big Ten Freshman Team	2024
