= 2023–24 Notre Dame Fighting Irish men's ice hockey season =

- Conference: 5th Big Ten
- Home ice: Compton Family Ice Arena

Rankings
- USCHO: NR
- USA Hockey: NR

Record
- Overall: 15–19–2
- Conference: 9–13–2
- Home: 13–8–0
- Road: 2–10–2
- Neutral: 0–1–0

Coaches and captains
- Head coach: Jeff Jackson
- Assistant coaches: Paul Pooley; Andy Slaggert; Brock Sheahan
- Captain: Landon Slaggert
- Alternate captain(s): Ryan Bischel; Jake Boltmann; Trevor Janicke

The 2023–24 Notre Dame Fighting Irish men's ice hockey season was the 64th season of play for the program and 7th in the Big Ten Conference. The Fighting Irish represented the University of Notre Dame in the 2023–24 NCAA Division I men's ice hockey season, played their home games at Compton Family Ice Arena and were coached by Jeff Jackson in his 19th season.

== Season ==
Facing a good deal of roster turnover entering the season, Notre Dame knew it would likely have to likely have to rely on its starting goaltender, Ryan Bischel. The 5th-year player didn't quite play as well as he had when he was named an All-American in 2023 but he still ranked among the best goaltenders in the nation. What he did not receive was much help from the defense. Notre Dame was one of the most porous teams in the nation, allowing more than 34 shots against per game. Despite the heavy workload, Bischel kept the Irish in most games, though the offense was a bit slow to get on track. Team captain Landon Slaggert had a tremendous season, leading the team with 20 goals on the year, but there was a sharp drop off after him. While Notre Dame received contributions from several new players, including having two freshman (Patrick Moynihan and Danny Nelson) finish in the top three, Notre Dame's offense wasn't able to find much consistency during the season.

The Fighting Irish had a few good stretches during the season, such as going undefeated in seven games from late-October to late-November. Unfortunately, the team had four separate instances where they lost at least three consecutive games. The fast-or-famine scoring was quite often the culprit; Notre Dame scored nearly 3 goals per game but the team was limited to less than 2 goals in ten matches. In spite of their struggles throughout the year, Notre Dame won several games against ranked opponents and had a winning record for much of the year. This put the team on the bubble for an at-large bid by the close of January. However, Notre Dame went 1–6 in their final seven matches to close out the regular season. While their opponents were a murderer's row of tournament-bound teams, Notre Dame's failure to win more than a single game knocked them out of contention and left a conference championship as their only avenue forward.

Opening on the road, Notre Dame faced long-time rival Michigan in the conference quarterfinals. The opening game saw the Irish take a commanding lead thanks to a scoring outburst in the second period. Drew Bavaro's 3-point game gave Notre Dame a 4–2 lead, which appeared to give the team all it needed to win. The Irish had only lost one game all season where they scored more than 2 goals and all they needed to do was let Bischel shut the door for the final 24 minutes to secure victory. However, after Michigan had cut the lead to 1, Bavaro did his best to act out a biblical idiom and tooketh away with a 5-minute major penalty for checking from behind at the end of the second. Michigan scored twice on the power play to take the lead and the Irish were unable to recover the momentum. Notre Dame managed just 4 shots in the third and let a win slip through their fingers. The rematch followed a similar pattern with Notre Dame managing to get a pair of 1-goal leads in the first two periods but their defense could not stop the offensive juggernaut that the Wolverines possessed. The Irish again went scoreless in the third and the second straight 1-goal loss ended their season.

== Departures ==
Player	Position	Nationality	Cause
Jack Adams	Forward	United States	Graduation (signed with South Carolina Stingrays)
Solag Bakich	Forward	United States	Graduation (signed with Reading Royals)
Chase Blackmun	Defenseman	United States	Graduation (retired)
Ben Brinkman	Defenseman	United States	Graduation (signed with Iowa Heartlanders)
Jesse Lansdell	Forward	Canada	Graduate transfer to Omaha
Nick Leivermann	Defenseman	United States	Graduation (signed with Hershey Bears)
Jackson Pierson	Forward	United States	Graduation (signed with Fort Wayne Komets)
Chayse Primeau	Forward	United States	Graduation (signed with Florida Everblades)
Ryder Rolston	Forward	United States	Signed professional contract (Chicago Blackhawks)
Fin Williams	Forward	United States	Returned to juniors mid-season (Chicago Steel)

== Recruiting ==
Player	Position	Nationality	Age	Notes
Brennan Ali	Forward	United States	19	Glencoe, IL; selected 212th overall in 2022
Jayden Davis	Forward	Canada	20	Calgary, AB
Paul Fischer	Defenseman	United States	18	River Forest, IL; selected 138th overall in 2023
Maddox Fleming	Forward	United States	19	Rochester, MN
Cole Knuble	Forward	United States	19	Grand Rapids, MI; selected 103rd overall in 2023
Patrick Moynihan	Forward	United States	22	Millis, MA; graduate transfer from Providence; selected 158th overall in 2019
Brayden Napoli	Goaltender	United States	21	Lake Villa, IL; joined from club team
Danny Nelson	Forward	United States	18	Maple Grove, MN; selected 49th overall in 2023
Henry Nelson	Defenseman	United States	20	Maple Grove, MN
Ryan Siedem	Defenseman	United States	22	Madison, NJ; graduate transfer from Harvard
Carter Slaggert	Forward	United States	18	South Bend, IN

== Roster ==
As of March 3, 2024.

No.	Nat.	Player	Class	Pos	Height	Weight	DoB	Hometown	Previous team	NHL rights
2	(United States)	Ryan Siedem	Graduate	D	6' 2" (1.88 m)	192 lb (87 kg)	2001-02-25	Madison, New Jersey	Harvard (ECAC)	—
3	(United States)	Hunter Weiss	Junior	D	6' 3" (1.91 m)	220 lb (100 kg)	2001-03-29	Lake Forest, Illinois	Minnesota Magicians (NAHL)	—
4	(Canada)	Michael Mastrodomenico	Sophomore	D	6' 1" (1.85 m)	205 lb (93 kg)	2004-04-19	Kirkland, Quebec	Lincoln Stars (USHL)	—
6	(United States)	Jake Boltmann (A)	Senior	D	6' 1" (1.85 m)	200 lb (91 kg)	2001-10-19	Edina, Minnesota	Lincoln Stars (USHL)	CGY, 80th overall 2020
8	(United States)	Justin Janicke	Junior	F	6' 0" (1.83 m)	188 lb (85 kg)	2003-06-30	Maple Grove, Minnesota	USNTDP (USHL)	SEA, 195th overall 2021
9	(United States)	Grant Silianoff	Senior	F	5' 11" (1.8 m)	178 lb (81 kg)	2001-01-04	Edina, Minnesota	Cedar Rapids RoughRiders (USHL)	—
10	(United States)	Hunter Strand	Junior	F	5' 11" (1.8 m)	188 lb (85 kg)	2002-11-13	Anchorage, Alaska	Tri-City Storm (USHL)	—
11	(United States)	Danny Nelson	Freshman	F	6' 3" (1.91 m)	203 lb (92 kg)	2005-08-03	Maple Grove, Minnesota	USNTDP (USHL)	NYI, 49th overall 2023
12	(United States)	Henry Nelson	Freshman	D	6' 1" (1.85 m)	174 lb (79 kg)	2003-03-25	Maple Grove, Minnesota	Lincoln Stars (USHL)	—
13	(United States)	Brennan Ali	Freshman	F	6' 0" (1.83 m)	194 lb (88 kg)	2004-02-09	Glencoe, Illinois	Lincoln Stars (USHL)	DET, 212th overall 2022
14	(United States)	Maddox Fleming	Freshman	F	6' 1" (1.85 m)	194 lb (88 kg)	2004-02-13	Rochester, Minnesota	Sioux Falls Stampede (USHL)	—
15	(Canada)	Jayden Davis	Freshman	F	5' 11" (1.8 m)	185 lb (84 kg)	2003-03-02	Calgary, Alberta	Green Bay Gamblers (USHL)	—
16	(United States)	Paul Fischer	Freshman	D	6' 0" (1.83 m)	183 lb (83 kg)	2005-01-30	River Forest, Illinois	USNTDP (USHL)	STL, 138th overall 2023
17	(Canada)	Ryan Helliwell	Junior	D	6' 0" (1.83 m)	191 lb (87 kg)	2002-08-05	Burnaby, British Columbia	Trail Smoke Eaters (BCHL)	—
18	(United States)	Patrick Moynihan	Graduate	F	5' 11" (1.8 m)	183 lb (83 kg)	2001-01-23	Millis, Massachusetts	Providence (HEA)	NJD, 158th overall 2019
19	(United States)	Landon Slaggert (C)	Senior	F	6' 0" (1.83 m)	190 lb (86 kg)	2002-06-25	South Bend, Indiana	USNTDP (USHL)	CHI, 79th overall 2020
20	(Canada)	Niko Jovanovic	Sophomore	F	6' 4" (1.93 m)	216 lb (98 kg)	2002-06-13	West Vancouver, British Columbia	Spruce Grove Saints (AJHL)	—
21	(Canada)	Fin Williams	Sophomore	F	6' 1" (1.85 m)	186 lb (84 kg)	2003-04-21	North Vancouver, British Columbia	Penticton Vees (BCHL)	—
22	(United States)	Cole Knuble	Freshman	F	5' 11" (1.8 m)	185 lb (84 kg)	2004-07-01	Grand Rapids, Michigan	Fargo Force (USHL)	PHI, 103rd overall 2023
23	(United States)	Brady Bjork	Senior	F	6' 1" (1.85 m)	177 lb (80 kg)	1999-05-17	Mequon, Wisconsin	St. Cloud Norsemen (NAHL)	—
24	(United States)	Drew Bavaro	Senior	D	6' 2" (1.88 m)	198 lb (90 kg)	2000-06-10	Lakewood Ranch, Florida	Bentley (AHA)	—
25	(United States)	Carter Slaggert	Freshman	F	5' 9" (1.75 m)	172 lb (78 kg)	2005-03-04	South Bend, Indiana	USNTDP (USHL)	—
26	(United States)	Zach Plucinski	Senior	D	6' 1" (1.85 m)	204 lb (93 kg)	2000-07-26	Eagle River, Alaska	Omaha Lancers (USHL)	—
27	(United States)	Trevor Janicke (A)	Graduate	F	5' 10" (1.78 m)	200 lb (91 kg)	2000-12-25	Maple Grove, Minnesota	Central Illinois Flying Aces (USHL)	ANA, 132nd overall 2019
28	(United States)	Tyler Carpenter	Junior	F	5' 11" (1.8 m)	186 lb (84 kg)	2000-08-27	Palatine, Illinois	Omaha Lancers (USHL)	—
29	(United States)	Jack Williams	Sophomore	G	6' 3" (1.91 m)	187 lb (85 kg)	2001-06-21	St. Louis, Missouri	Waterloo Black Hawks (USHL)	—
30	(United States)	Ryan Bischel (A)	Graduate	G	6' 1" (1.85 m)	190 lb (86 kg)	1999-07-05	Medina, Minnesota	Fargo Force (USHL)	—
33	(United States)	Josh Graziano	Senior	G	6' 3" (1.91 m)	215 lb (98 kg)	2000-03-22	Buffalo, New York	Johnstown Tomahawks (NAHL)	—
34	(United States)	Brayden Napoli	Senior	G	6' 0" (1.83 m)	170 lb (77 kg)	2002-06-19	Lake Villa, Illinois	Highland Park (Midget AAA)	—

== Standings ==
2023–24 Big Ten ice hockey Standings
	Conference record										Overall record					
	GP	W	L	T	OTW	OTL	3/SW	PTS	GF	GA	GP	W	L	T	GF	GA
#5 Michigan State †*	24	16	6	2	0	1	1	52	92	69	38	25	10	3	147	117
#11 Wisconsin	24	16	7	1	2	2	1	50	81	57	40	26	12	2	128	81
#7 Minnesota	24	13	7	4	3	1	0	41	80	65	39	23	11	5	135	100
#4 Michigan	24	11	11	2	1	1	1	36	85	77	41	23	15	3	169	125
Notre Dame	24	9	13	2	0	1	1	31	66	62	36	15	19	2	101	98
Penn State	24	7	14	3	0	1	2	27	62	92	36	15	18	3	113	130
Ohio State	24	4	18	2	1	0	2	15	50	94	38	14	20	4	100	124
Championship: March 23, 2024 † indicates conference regular season champion * indicates conference tournament champion Rankings: USCHO.com Top 20 Poll; updated April 11, 2024

== Schedule and results ==
Date	Time	Opponent^{#}	Rank^{#}	Site	TV	Decision	Result	Attendance	Record
Regular Season
October 7	6:00 pm	Clarkson*	#20	Compton Family Ice Arena • Notre Dame, Indiana	Peacock	Bischel	L 1–3	4,395	0–1–0
October 8	5:00 pm	Clarkson*	#20	Compton Family Ice Arena • Notre Dame, Indiana	Peacock	Bischel	W 3–0	3,726	1–1–0
October 14	7:00 pm	vs. RIT*		Blue Cross Arena • Rochester, New York	FloHockey	Bischel	L 0–3	10,556	1–2–0
October 20	7:00 pm	#6 Boston University*		Compton Family Ice Arena • Notre Dame, Indiana	Peacock	Bischel	W 4–1	4,387	2–2–0
October 21	6:00 pm	#6 Boston University*		Compton Family Ice Arena • Notre Dame, Indiana	Peacock	Bischel	L 2–8	4,508	2–3–0
October 26	7:30 pm	Mercyhurst*		Compton Family Ice Arena • Notre Dame, Indiana	Peacock	Bischel	W 4–3 ^{OT}	3,919	3–3–0
October 27	7:30 pm	Mercyhurst*		Compton Family Ice Arena • Notre Dame, Indiana	Peacock	Bischel	W 5–0	5,022	4–3–0
November 4	7:30 pm	at #17 Penn State		Pegula Ice Arena • University Park, Pennsylvania		Bischel	T 3–3 ^{SOW}	6,499	4–3–1 (0–0–1)
November 5	4:30 pm	at #17 Penn State		Pegula Ice Arena • University Park, Pennsylvania	BTN	Bischel	T 2–2 ^{SOL}	6,262	4–3–2 (0–0–2)
November 10	7:30 pm	#19 Ohio State		Compton Family Ice Arena • Notre Dame, Indiana	Peacock	Bischel	W 4–1	5,120	5–3–2 (1–0–2)
November 11	6:00 pm	#19 Ohio State		Compton Family Ice Arena • Notre Dame, Indiana	Peacock	Bischel	W 3–0	5,183	6–3–2 (2–0–2)
November 17	8:00 pm	at #6 Minnesota	#17	3M Arena at Mariucci • Minneapolis, Minnesota	Fox 9, BTN+	Bischel	W 4–2	9,741	7–3–2 (3–0–2)
November 18	8:00 pm	at #6 Minnesota	#17	3M Arena at Mariucci • Minneapolis, Minnesota	Fox 9+, BTN+	Bischel	L 1–4	9,538	7–4–2 (3–1–2)
November 24	4:00 pm	#2 Boston College*	#18	Compton Family Ice Arena • Notre Dame, Indiana (Holy War on Ice)	Peacock	Bischel	L 1–6	5,126	7–5–2
December 1	7:30 pm	#13 Michigan		Compton Family Ice Arena • Notre Dame, Indiana (Rivalry)	Peacock	Bischel	W 6–1	5,037	8–5–2 (4–1–2)
December 2	6:00 pm	#13 Michigan		Compton Family Ice Arena • Notre Dame, Indiana (Rivalry)	Peacock	Bischel	L 1–2	5,014	8–6–2 (4–2–2)
December 8	7:00 pm	at #7 Michigan State	#20	Munn Ice Arena • East Lansing, Michigan		Bischel	L 2–5	6,555	8–7–2 (4–3–2)
December 9	6:00 pm	at #7 Michigan State	#20	Munn Ice Arena • East Lansing, Michigan		Bischel	L 1–2	6,555	8–8–2 (4–4–2)
December 30	5:00 pm	Augustana*		Compton Family Ice Arena • Notre Dame, Indiana	Peacock	Bischel	W 5–1	5,136	9–8–2
December 31	5:00 pm	Augustana*		Compton Family Ice Arena • Notre Dame, Indiana	Peacock	Bischel	W 3–2 ^{OT}	5,022	10–8–2
January 5	7:00 pm	#5 Wisconsin		Compton Family Ice Arena • Notre Dame, Indiana	Peacock	Bischel	L 1–2	5,069	10–9–2 (4–5–2)
January 6	5:00 pm	#5 Wisconsin		Compton Family Ice Arena • Notre Dame, Indiana	Peacock	Bischel	L 4–7	5,077	10–10–2 (4–6–2)
January 12	7:00 pm	at Ohio State		Value City Arena • Columbus, Ohio	BTN	Bischel	L 2–3	5,762	10–11–2 (4–7–2)
January 13	7:00 pm	at Ohio State		Value City Arena • Columbus, Ohio	BTN	Bischel	W 5–2	6,566	11–11–2 (5–7–2)
January 19	7:30 pm	Penn State		Compton Family Ice Arena • Notre Dame, Indiana	Peacock	Bischel	W 4–1	5,151	12–11–2 (6–7–2)
January 20	6:00 pm	Penn State		Compton Family Ice Arena • Notre Dame, Indiana	Peacock	Bischel	W 6–3	5,354	13–11–2 (7–7–2)
February 2	7:30 pm	#8 Michigan State		Compton Family Ice Arena • Notre Dame, Indiana	Peacock	Bischel	W 4–1	5,292	14–11–2 (8–7–2)
February 3	6:00 pm	#8 Michigan State		Compton Family Ice Arena • Notre Dame, Indiana	Peacock, TSN3, TSN4	Bischel	L 0–4	5,217	14–12–2 (8–8–2)
February 9	8:00 pm	at #4 Wisconsin		Kohl Center • Madison, Wisconsin	BTN+	Bischel	L 2–4	9,789	14–13–2 (8–9–2)
February 10	7:00 pm	at #4 Wisconsin		Kohl Center • Madison, Wisconsin	BTN+	Bischel	L 2–3	12,672	14–14–2 (8–10–2)
February 16	7:30 pm	#8 Minnesota		Compton Family Ice Arena • Notre Dame, Indiana	Peacock	Bischel	W 6–1	5,264	15–14–2 (9–10–2)
February 17	6:00 pm	#8 Minnesota		Compton Family Ice Arena • Notre Dame, Indiana	Peacock	Bischel	L 2–3 ^{OT}	5,326	15–15–2 (9–11–2)
February 23	8:00 pm	at #17 Michigan		Yost Ice Arena • Ann Arbor, Michigan (Rivalry)	BTN	Bischel	L 0–4	5,800	15–16–2 (9–12–2)
February 24	6:30 pm	at #17 Michigan		Yost Ice Arena • Ann Arbor, Michigan (Rivalry)	BTN	Bischel	L 1–2	5,800	15–17–2 (9–13–2)
Big Ten Tournament
March 8	7:00 pm	at #14 Michigan*		Yost Ice Arena • Ann Arbor, Michigan (Quarterfinal Game 1, Rivalry)	BTN+	Bischel	L 4–5	5,678	15–18–2
March 9	7:00 pm	at #14 Michigan*		Yost Ice Arena • Ann Arbor, Michigan (Quarterfinal Game 2, Rivalry)	BTN+	Bischel	L 3–4	5,800	15–19–2
*Non-conference game. ^{#}Rankings from USCHO.com Poll. All times are in Eastern Time. Source:

== Scoring statistics ==
Name	Position	Games	Goals	Assists	Points	PIM
Landon Slaggert	C/LW	36	20	11	31	10
Patrick Moynihan	RW	36	10	14	24	12
Danny Nelson	C	30	9	14	23	32
Drew Bavaro	D	35	10	10	20	38
Cole Knuble	C	36	9	11	20	12
Ryan Siedem	D	36	3	17	20	12
Hunter Strand	C	36	4	15	19	2
Trevor Janicke	C/RW	32	9	7	16	16
Justin Janicke	C/LW	36	4	12	16	30
Paul Fischer	D	34	2	14	16	30
Brennan Ali	C	36	3	10	13	4
Maddox Fleming	RW	35	3	9	12	8
Grant Silianoff	RW	28	4	7	11	12
Tyler Carpenter	F	33	5	4	9	16
Carter Slaggert	F	32	3	4	7	24
Mike Mastrodomenico	D	33	1	6	7	25
Zachary Plucinski	D	36	0	4	4	41
Jayden Davis	F	21	2	1	3	19
Jake Boltmann	D	30	0	2	2	22
Brady Bjork	LW/RW	5	0	1	1	2
Henry Nelson	D	31	0	1	1	42
Jack Williams	G	1	0	0	0	0
Hunter Weiss	D	1	0	0	0	0
Ryan Helliwell	D	9	0	0	0	17
Ryan Bischel	G	36	0	0	0	2
Bench	-	-	-	-	-	18
Total			101	174	275	503

== Goaltending statistics ==
Name	Games	Minutes	Wins	Losses	Ties	Goals against	Saves	Shut outs	SV %	GAA
Ryan Bischel	36	2112:09	15	19	2	91	1112	3	.924	2.59
Jack Williams	1	40:00	0	0	0	3	25	0	.893	4.50
Empty Net	-	22:34	-	-	-	4	-	-	-	-
Total	36	2174:43	15	19	2	98	1137	3	.921	2.70

== Rankings ==
Poll	Week																										
Poll	Pre	1	2	3	4	5	6	7	8	9	10	11	12	13	14	15	16	17	18	19	20	21	22	23	24	25	26 (Final)
USCHO.com	20	NR	NR	NR	NR	NR	17	18	NR	20	NR	–	NR	NR	NR	20	NR	NR	NR	NR	NR	NR	NR	NR	NR	–	NR
USA Hockey	19	NR	NR	NR	NR	NR	18	18	20	20	NR	NR	–	NR	NR	19	20	20т	NR	20	NR	NR	NR	NR	NR	NR	NR

Note: USCHO did not release a poll in weeks 11 or 25.
Note: USA Hockey did not release a poll in week 12.

== Awards and honors ==
Player	Award	Ref
Landon Slaggert	Big Ten Second Team	

== 2024 NHL entry draft ==
Round	Pick	Player	NHL team
4	114	Nicholas Kempf ^{†}	Washington Capitals

† incoming freshman
