= 2023–24 Michigan State Spartans men's ice hockey season =

Sports team season

Big Ten, Champion Big Ten Tournament, Champion NCAA Tournament, Regional Final
- Conference: 1st Big Ten
- Home ice: Munn Ice Arena

Rankings
- USCHO: #5
- USA Hockey: #5

Record
- Overall: 25–10–3
- Conference: 16–6–2
- Home: 13–3–1
- Road: 9–6–1
- Neutral: 3–1–1

Coaches and captains
- Head coach: Adam Nightingale
- Assistant coaches: Jared DeMichiel; Mike Towns
- Captain: Nash Nienhuis
- Alternate captains: Matt Basgall; Karsen Dorwart; Nicolas Müller

The 2023–24 Michigan State Spartans men's ice hockey season was the 82nd season of play for the program and 33rd in the Big Ten. The Spartans represented Michigan State University in the 2023–24 NCAA Division I men's ice hockey season, played their home games at the Munn Ice Arena and were coached by Adam Nightingale in his 2nd season. Michigan State won the Big Ten men's ice hockey tournament for the first time in program history.

== Season ==
After its best season in nearly a decade, Michigan State continued its rebuild by changing more than half of its roster. Fifteen new players were at the Spartans' training camp, including top prospects Trey Augustine and Artyom Levshunov. The massive influx of talent drew a great deal of attention towards MSU and the team was ranked in the top-10 in the preseason polls.

The offense, at least lived up to that billing in the first part of the season when Michigan State started 5–1 by averaging nearly 5 goals per game. Despite their solid start, the last week of October emphasized a weakness for the team when they were swept by Boston College; the defense was porous. MSU allowed had a tendency to allow their opponents to get bunches of shots on goals and, over the course of the season, proved to be the 4th worst in terms of shots against. Leaving their young goaltender on an island could have been disastrous but Augustine reveled in he action and gave MSU a chance to win most nights despite allowing nearly 3 goals per game.

Having below average numbers on defense, the Spartan's success was dependent on their offense. The team was well situated and got contributions from up and down the lineup. Six players finished with double-digit goal totals and ten posted 20 points or more. While the Spartans did not have a go-to leader on the offense, the scoring by committee got the team all the offense they needed. That was made apparent when the Spartans began their conference schedule by losing once in their first 10 Big Ten games. They had done so while playing ranked teams for the entire stretch, sweeping the then-#1 Wisconsin in the process. This put the Spartans atop the conference standings and had them on their way to making their first NCAA tournament appearance in twelve years.

Michigan State started the second half of its season without their starting goaltender, however, since he was busy tending goal for Team USA at the World Junior Championships there were no concerns. Luca Di Pasquo played well in his absence but was unable to lead the Spartans to a win at the Great Lakes Invitational. Once Augustine returned, the team got back to business and continued as one of the best teams in the nation. While a bit of inconsistency crept into the scoring in the second half, The Spartans stubbornly remained atop the conference standings and entered the final week of the season needing one win to capture their first Big Ten title since 1976. With Wisconsin just 2 points behind, A regulation win in either game would give MSU the championship. Though the Badgers got an early lead, two goals from Michigan State in the first put them ahead after 20 minutes. a major penalty to Maxim Štrbák resulted in Wisconsin tying the score but Reed Lebster became the hero with a third period goal to put MSU ahead for good. The victory not only gave MSU a conference title but gave the team a bye into the semifinal round. Even with a loss in the regular season finale, MSU remained on track for a high seed in the NCAA tournament and had a chance to improve their position further.

The Spartans had a week off to get ready for their next opponent and found a surprise when Ohio State arrived for the semifinal. The heavily favored Spartans soon found themselves in a rare kind of match; a goaltending battle. In the lowest-scoring game all season (tied), MSU needed their goaltender to come up big and Augustine did not disappoint. The freshman made 37 saves in the match, enabling team captain Nash Nienhuis to score the winning goal and propel the Spartans to their first Big Ten title game. Only long-time rival and two-time defending champion Michigan was left in Spartans' path and the conference two top offenses produced a memorable match. The game started fast, with the Wolverines taking the lead in the first minute of play, however, scoring came at a premium in the first half of the game. MSU tied the match about 10 minutes later but nothing from either team got past the goaltenders for the succeeding 20 minutes. Daniel Russell broke the tie just after the midway point of the game and began a torrent of scoring in the second. Michigan responded with two markers to retake the lead but in the final 80 seconds, the Spartans netted a pair of their own. With about 0.7 seconds left in the middle frame a one-timer from Matt Bagsall was tipped by Tanner Kelly into the Wolverine net and put MSU back on top. Michigan tied the match for a fifth time early in the third and caused Michigan State to try and bury their opponents under an avalanche of shots. Despite nearly doubling the total they had in the first two periods, MSU was unable to score before the end of regulation and the two headed into overtime. In the back half of the fourth period, Patrick Geary scored the biggest goal of his young career when he fired a shot from just inside the Michigan blueline. The puck eluded the traffic in front and found its way into the far corner of the cage.

Winning the conference championship lifted MSU up to #4 in the PairWise rankings and gave the Spartans a one-seed in the NCAA tournament. They were placed in the Midwest regional and set to face Western Michigan in the opening round. However, despite being favored in the match, Michigan State's weak defense put the team in a precarious position. Western opened the scoring in the first but by the middle of the second, Michigan State was able to take the lead. Shortly afterwards, MSU's only penalty of the game cost the squad and began a run by the Broncos. WMU scored three goals in just over three minutes and took a lead into the third. Nienhuis cut the lead in half but the Spartans were unable to get the tying marker over the succeeding 10 minutes. With just moments left in their season, Augustine was pulled for an extra attacker. On a rush up the ice, Levshunov found Karsen Dorwart, who had somehow gotten wide open right in front of the cage, and the sophomore smacked the puck into a half-open cage for his 15th of the season. The late goal seemed to give all of the momentum to MSU which carried over into overtime. In nearly 9 minutes of playing time, not a single shot got to Augustine. Meanwhile, a rather harmless shot from Jeremy Davidson deflected off of a Bronco stick into the net.

The lucky goal set Michigan State up with a rematch against Michigan. Though the Spartans got the opening goal, the team had a hard time staying out of the box and were called for six penalties in the game. Though the Spartans only surrendered one power play goal, while scoring two themselves, the repeated penalty kills disrupted their offense and seemed to wear out the Spartan defenders as the game went along. Michigan State found itself behind for the first time in the third period. Though Joey Larson was able to tie the game a few minutes later, the reprieve did not last and the Wolvers scored two goals in 12 seconds. The stunning turnaround forced a furious comeback attempt by the Spartans but they were unable to do any more damage on offense. A late goal from Michigan all but ended the game and even though Augustine was pulled late, both teams seemed to understand that the Spartan's season was over.

== Departures ==
Player	Position	Nationality	Cause
Powell Connor	Defenseman	Canada	Left program (retired)
Pierce Charleson	Goaltender	Canada	Transferred to Alaska
Zach Dubinsky	Forward	United States	Graduate transfer to Vermont
Cal Dybicz	Defenseman	United States	Left program (retired)
Kyle Haskins	Forward	United States	Left program (retired)
A. J. Hodges	Forward	United States	Left program (retired)
Justin Jallen	Forward	United States	Graduation (retired)
Jagger Joshua	Forward	United States	Graduation (signed with Wilkes-Barre/Scranton Penguins)
Christian Krygier	Defenseman	United States	Graduation (signed with Bridgeport Islanders)
Cole Krygier	Defenseman	United States	Graduation (signed with Los Angeles Kings)
Erik Middendorf	Forward	United States	Graduation (signed with Adirondack Thunder)
Miroslav Mucha	Forward	Slovakia	Graduation (signed with Greenville Swamp Rabbits)
Ryan Nolan	Forward	United States	Graduation (retired)
Dylan St. Cyr	Goaltender	United States	Graduation (signed with Grand Rapids Griffins)
Jesse Tucker	Forward	Canada	Transferred to Clarkson
Mike Underwood	Defenseman	United States	Graduation (signed with Colorado Eagles)

== Recruiting ==
Player	Position	Nationality	Age	Notes
Trey Augustine	Goaltender	United States	18	South Lyon, MI; selected 41st overall in 2023
Owen Baker	Forward	United States	19	Howell, MI
James Crossman	Defenseman	United States	24	Cherry Hills, CO; graduate transfer from Brown
Luca Di Pasquo	Goaltender	United States	20	Livonia, MI; transfer from Rensselaer
Patrick Geary	Defenseman	United States	19	Hamburg, NY
Isaac Howard	Forward	United States	19	Hudson, WI; transfer from Minnesota Duluth; selected 31st overall in 2022
Griffin Jurecki	Forward	United States	20	Grosse Ile, MI
Joey Larson	Forward	United States	22	Brighton, MI; transfer from Northern Michigan
Reed Lebster	Forward	United States	24	Grand Rapids, MI; graduate transfer from Massachusetts
Artyom Levshunov	Defenseman	Belarus	17	Zhlobin, BLR
Tommi Männistö	Forward	Finland	19	Riihimäki, FIN
Gavin O'Connell	Forward	United States	19	Wayzata, MN
Austin Oravetz	Defenseman	United States	20	Canonsburg, PA; graduate transfer from Massachusetts
Red Savage	Forward	United States	20	Scottsdale, AZ; transfer from Miami; selected 114th overall in 2021
Maxim Štrbák	Defenseman	Slovakia	18	Košice, SVK; selected 45th overall in 2023

== Roster ==
As of July 24, 2023.

No.	Nat.	Player	Class	Pos	Height	Weight	DoB	Hometown	Previous team	NHL rights
1	(United States)	Trey Augustine	Freshman	G	6' 1" (1.85 m)	179 lb (81 kg)	2005-02-23	South Lyon, Michigan	USNTDP (USHL)	DET, 41st overall 2023
2	(United States)	Patrick Geary	Freshman	D	6' 1" (1.85 m)	185 lb (84 kg)	2004-02-18	Hamburg, New York	Waterloo Black Hawks (USHL)	—
3	(Sweden)	Viktor Hurtig	Sophomore	D	6' 6" (1.98 m)	197 lb (89 kg)	2002-04-28	Avesta, Sweden	Mora J20 (J20 Nationell)	NJD, 164th overall 2021
4	(Canada)	Nash Nienhuis (C)	Senior	D	5' 10" (1.78 m)	185 lb (84 kg)	1999-12-05	Sarnia, Ontario	Omaha Lancers (USHL)	—
5	(Belarus)	Artyom Levshunov	Freshman	D	6' 2" (1.88 m)	198 lb (90 kg)	2005-10-28	Zhlobin, Belarus	Green Bay Gamblers (USHL)	—
6	(United States)	Austin Oravetz	Freshman	D	5' 9" (1.75 m)	192 lb (87 kg)	2003-09-26	Canonsburg, Pennsylvania	Green Bay Gamblers (USHL)	—
7	(Canada)	David Gucciardi	Junior	D	6' 1" (1.85 m)	190 lb (86 kg)	2002-10-09	Toronto, Ontario	Waterloo Black Hawks (USHL)	WSH, 213th overall 2022
8	(Slovakia)	Maxim Štrbák	Freshman	D	6' 2" (1.88 m)	205 lb (93 kg)	2005-04-13	Košice, Slovakia	Sioux Falls Stampede (USHL)	BUF, 45th overall 2023
9	(United States)	Matt Basgall	Sophomore	D	5' 9" (1.75 m)	190 lb (86 kg)	2002-08-16	Lake Forest, Illinois	Tri-City Storm (USHL)	—
10	(Finland)	Tommi Männistö	Freshman	F	6' 0" (1.83 m)	185 lb (84 kg)	2004-02-07	Riihimäki, Finland	Tappara U20 (U20 SM-sarja)	—
11	(United States)	Jeremy Davidson	Senior	F	5' 10" (1.78 m)	177 lb (80 kg)	2000-02-28	Kalamazoo, Michigan	Fargo Force (USHL)	—
12	(United States)	Griffin Jurecki	Freshman	F	5' 10" (1.78 m)	182 lb (83 kg)	2003-05-03	Grosse Ile, Michigan	Omaha Lancers (USHL)	—
13	(United States)	Tiernan Shoudy	Sophomore	F	5' 9" (1.75 m)	180 lb (82 kg)	2002-03-15	St. Clair, Michigan	Youngstown Phantoms (USHL)	—
16	(United States)	Owen Baker	Freshman	F	5' 10" (1.78 m)	185 lb (84 kg)	2004-01-29	Howell, Michigan	Waterloo Black Hawks (USHL)	—
18	(United States)	Joey Larson	Sophomore	F	6' 1" (1.85 m)	194 lb (88 kg)	2001-03-27	Brighton, Michigan	Northern Michigan (CCHA)	—
19	(Switzerland)	Nicolas Müller	Graduate	F	6' 0" (1.83 m)	188 lb (85 kg)	1999-06-21	Arisdorf, Switzerland	Modo J20 (J20 SuperElit)	—
20	(United States)	Daniel Russell	Sophomore	F	5' 9" (1.75 m)	160 lb (73 kg)	2001-11-16	Traverse City, Michigan	Sioux Falls Stampede (USHL)	—
21	(United States)	Red Savage	Junior	F	5' 11" (1.8 m)	185 lb (84 kg)	2003-05-15	Scottsdale, Arizona	Miami (NCHC)	DET, 114th overall 2021
22	(United States)	Isaac Howard	Sophomore	F	5' 11" (1.8 m)	190 lb (86 kg)	2004-03-30	Hudson, Wisconsin	Minnesota Duluth (NCHC)	TBL, 31st overall 2022
23	(United States)	Reed Lebster	Graduate	F	6' 0" (1.83 m)	188 lb (85 kg)	1999-03-05	Grand Rapids, Michigan	Massachusetts (HEA)	—
24	(United States)	James Crossman	Senior	D	6' 3" (1.91 m)	200 lb (91 kg)	1998-11-23	Denver, Colorado	Brown (ECAC)	—
26	(United States)	Tanner Kelly	Junior	F	5' 10" (1.78 m)	175 lb (79 kg)	2002-05-11	San Diego, California	Muskegon Lumberjacks (USHL)	—
27	(United States)	Gavin Best	Sophomore	F	6' 2" (1.88 m)	190 lb (86 kg)	2001-08-24	Richfield, Minnesota	Minnesota Magicians (NAHL)	—
28	(United States)	Karsen Dorwart	Sophomore	F	6' 1" (1.85 m)	191 lb (87 kg)	2002-09-17	Sherwood, Oregon	Sioux Falls Stampede (USHL)	—
29	(United States)	Gavin O'Connell	Freshman	F	6' 0" (1.83 m)	181 lb (82 kg)	2004-02-19	Wayzata, Minnesota	Waterloo Black Hawks (USHL)	—
30	(United States)	Jon Mor	Senior	G	6' 2" (1.88 m)	200 lb (91 kg)	2000-07-20	Highland Park, Illinois	Langley Rivermen (BCHL)	—
31	(United States)	Luca Di Pasquo	Freshman	G	6' 0" (1.83 m)	201 lb (91 kg)	2003-09-24	Livonia, Michigan	Penticton Vees (BCHL)	—

== Standings ==
2023–24 Big Ten ice hockey Standings
	Conference record										Overall record					
	GP	W	L	T	OTW	OTL	3/SW	PTS	GF	GA	GP	W	L	T	GF	GA
#5 Michigan State †*	24	16	6	2	0	1	1	52	92	69	38	25	10	3	147	117
#11 Wisconsin	24	16	7	1	2	2	1	50	81	57	40	26	12	2	128	81
#7 Minnesota	24	13	7	4	3	1	0	41	80	65	39	23	11	5	135	100
#4 Michigan	24	11	11	2	1	1	1	36	85	77	41	23	15	3	169	125
Notre Dame	24	9	13	2	0	1	1	31	66	62	36	15	19	2	101	98
Penn State	24	7	14	3	0	1	2	27	62	92	36	15	18	3	113	130
Ohio State	24	4	18	2	1	0	2	15	50	94	38	14	20	4	100	124
Championship: March 23, 2024 † indicates conference regular season champion * indicates conference tournament champion Rankings: USCHO.com Top 20 Poll; updated April 11, 2024

== Schedule and results ==
Date	Time	Opponent^{#}	Rank^{#}	Site	TV	Decision	Result	Attendance	Record
Regular Season
October 7	4:00 pm	Lake Superior State*	#9	Munn Ice Arena • East Lansing, Michigan	BTN+	Augustine	W 5–2	6,555	1–0–0
October 8	4:00 pm	Lake Superior State*	#9	Munn Ice Arena • East Lansing, Michigan	BTN+	Augustine	W 4–2	6,555	2–0–0
October 12	9:00 pm	at Air Force*	#8	Cadet Ice Arena • Colorado Springs, Colorado	FloHockey	Di Pasquo	L 5–6	2,589	2–1–0
October 13	9:00 pm	at Air Force*	#8	Cadet Ice Arena • Colorado Springs, Colorado	FloHockey	Augustine	W 5–3	2,708	3–1–0
October 19	7:00 pm	Canisius*	#8	Munn Ice Arena • East Lansing, Michigan	BTN+	Augustine	W 6–3	5,992	4–1–0
October 20	7:00 pm	Canisius*	#8	Munn Ice Arena • East Lansing, Michigan	BTN+	Di Pasquo	W 4–3	6,492	5–1–0
October 26	7:00 pm	at #3 Boston College*	#8	Conte Forum • Chestnut Hill, Massachusetts	ESPN+	Augustine	L 4–6	5,195	5–2–0
October 27	7:00 pm	at #3 Boston College*	#8	Conte Forum • Chestnut Hill, Massachusetts	ESPN+	Augustine	L 1–5	7,884	5–3–0
November 3	7:00 pm	at #13 Ohio State	#12	Value City Arena • Columbus, Ohio	BTN+	Augustine	W 6–0	4,407	6–3–0 (1–0–0)
November 4	5:00 pm	at #13 Ohio State	#12	Value City Arena • Columbus, Ohio	BTN+	Augustine	W 6–4	5,121	7–3–0 (2–0–0)
November 10	7:00 pm	#17 Penn State	#11	Munn Ice Arena • East Lansing, Michigan	BTN+	Augustine	T 3–3 ^{SOL}	6,200	7–3–1 (2–0–1)
November 11	4:00 pm	#17 Penn State	#11	Munn Ice Arena • East Lansing, Michigan	BTN+	Augustine	W 5–3	6,288	8–3–1 (3–0–1)
November 17	7:30 pm	#1 Wisconsin	#11	Munn Ice Arena • East Lansing, Michigan	BTN+	Augustine	W 4–2	6,555	9–3–1 (4–0–1)
November 18	8:00 pm	#1 Wisconsin	#11	Munn Ice Arena • East Lansing, Michigan	BTN+	Augustine	W 3–2	6,555	10–3–1 (5–0–1)
November 24	8:00 pm	at #8 Minnesota	#7	3M Arena at Mariucci • Minneapolis, Minnesota	Fox 9+, BTN+	Augustine	T 3–3 ^{SOW}	10,392	10–3–2 (5–0–2)
November 26	2:00 pm	at #8 Minnesota	#7	3M Arena at Mariucci • Minneapolis, Minnesota	BTN	Augustine	L 5–6 ^{OT}	8,494	10–4–2 (5–1–2)
December 8	7:00 pm	#20 Notre Dame	#7	Munn Ice Arena • East Lansing, Michigan	BTN+	Augustine	W 5–2	6,555	11–4–2 (6–1–2)
December 9	6:00 pm	#20 Notre Dame	#7	Munn Ice Arena • East Lansing, Michigan	BTN+	Augustine	W 2–1	6,555	12–4–2 (7–1–2)
Great Lakes Invitational
December 28	7:00 pm	vs. Ferris State*	#7	Van Andel Arena • Grand Rapids, Michigan (Great Lakes Invitational Semifinal)	FloHockey	Di Pasquo	W 4–1	7,950	13–4–2
December 29	7:00 pm	vs. Michigan Tech*	#7	Van Andel Arena • Grand Rapids, Michigan (Great Lakes Invitational Championship)	FloHockey	Di Pasquo	T 3–3 ^{SOL}	6,958	13–4–3
Regular Season
January 5	7:00 pm	USNTDP*	#8	Munn Ice Arena • East Lansing, Michigan (Exhibition)	BTN+	Di Pasquo	W 5–2	N/A	
January 12	7:00 pm	at #20 Penn State	#8	Pegula Ice Arena • University Park, Pennsylvania	BTN+	Augustine	W 5–0	6,349	14–4–3 (8–1–2)
January 13	4:30 pm	at #20 Penn State	#8	Pegula Ice Arena • University Park, Pennsylvania	BTN	Augustine	W 7–3	6,483	15–4–3 (9–1–2)
January 19	7:00 pm	#15 Michigan	#7	Munn Ice Arena • East Lansing, Michigan (Rivalry)	BTN+	Augustine	L 1–7	6,555	15–5–3 (9–2–2)
January 20	7:00 pm	at #15 Michigan	#7	Yost Ice Arena • Ann Arbor, Michigan (Rivalry)	BTN+	Augustine	W 7–5	5,800	16–5–3 (10–2–2)
January 26	6:00 pm	#9 Minnesota	#8	Munn Ice Arena • East Lansing, Michigan	BTN+	Augustine	W 3–2	6,555	17–5–3 (11–2–2)
January 27	4:00 pm	#9 Minnesota	#8	Munn Ice Arena • East Lansing, Michigan	BTN	Augustine	L 1–5	6,555	17–6–3 (11–3–2)
February 2	7:30 pm	at Notre Dame	#8	Compton Family Ice Arena • Notre Dame, Indiana	Peacock	Augustine	L 1–4	5,292	17–7–3 (11–4–2)
February 3	6:00 pm	at Notre Dame	#8	Compton Family Ice Arena • Notre Dame, Indiana	Peacock	Augustine	W 4–0	5,217	18–7–3 (12–4–2)
February 9	7:00 pm	at #11 Michigan	#9	Yost Ice Arena • Ann Arbor, Michigan (Rivalry)	BTN+	Augustine	W 5–1	5,800	19–7–3 (13–4–2)
February 10	8:30 pm	vs. #11 Michigan	#9	Little Caesars Arena • Detroit, Michigan (Duel in the D)	BTN	Augustine	W 3–2	18,410	20–7–3 (14–4–2)
February 23	7:00 pm	Ohio State	#4т	Munn Ice Arena • East Lansing, Michigan	BTN+	Augustine	L 2–6	6,555	20–8–3 (14–5–2)
February 24	6:00 pm	Ohio State	#4т	Munn Ice Arena • East Lansing, Michigan	BTN+	Augustine	W 5–2	6,555	21–8–3 (15–5–2)
March 1	9:00 pm	at #4 Wisconsin	#6	Kohl Center • Madison, Wisconsin	BTN+	Augustine	W 5–2	13,208	22–8–3 (16–5–2)
March 2	9:00 pm	at #4 Wisconsin	#6	Kohl Center • Madison, Wisconsin	BTN+	Augustine	L 1–4	13,428	22–9–3 (16–6–2)
Big Ten Tournament
March 16	6:30 pm	Ohio State	#4	Munn Ice Arena • East Lansing, Michigan (Semifinals)	BTN	Augustine	W 2–1	6,555	23–9–3
March 23	8:00 pm	#10 Michigan	#5	Munn Ice Arena • East Lansing, Michigan (Championship)	BTN	Augustine	W 5–4 ^{OT}	6,555	24–9–3
NCAA Tournament
March 29	5:00 pm	vs. #14 Western Michigan*	#4	Centene Community Ice Center • Maryland Heights, Missouri (Midwest Regional Semifinal)	ESPNU	Augustine	W 5–4 ^{OT}	3,148	25–9–3
March 31	4:00 pm	vs. #10 Michigan*	#4	Centene Community Ice Center • Maryland Heights, Missouri (Midwest Regional Finals)	ESPN2	Augustine	L 2–5	3,148	25–10–3
*Non-conference game. ^{#}Rankings from USCHO.com Poll. All times are in Eastern Time. Source:

== Scoring statistics ==
Name	Position	Games	Goals	Assists	Points	PIM
Isaac Howard	LW	36	8	28	36	10
Artyom Levshunov	D	38	9	26	35	44
Karsen Dorwart	F	38	15	19	34	28
Joey Larson	RW	38	16	16	32	8
Nicolas Müller	C/RW	38	7	22	29	22
Red Savage	C	38	10	17	27	12
Gavin O'Connell	RW	38	15	11	26	12
Daniel Russell	C	38	13	12	25	38
Nash Nienhuis	D	38	9	15	24	22
Jeremy Davidson	RW	38	12	10	22	28
Reed Lebster	RW	35	6	13	19	12
Tanner Kelly	F	35	9	9	18	34
Matt Basgall	D	38	1	15	16	26
Tiernan Shoudy	F	38	4	12	16	26
Patrick Geary	D	32	5	8	13	30
Tommi Männistö	RW	32	2	7	9	17
Maxim Štrbák	D	32	1	9	10	39
David Gucciardi	D	30	2	6	8	47
Austin Oravetz	D	33	0	5	5	15
Griffin Jurecki	LW	6	1	1	2	0
Owen Baker	RW	7	1	1	2	15
Viktor Hurtig	D	9	1	1	2	6
Trey Augustine	G	35	0	1	1	0
James Crossman	F	5	0	0	0	0
Luca Di Pasquo	G	4	0	0	0	0
Jon Mor	G	1	0	0	0	0
Gavin Best	F	2	0	0	0	0
Total			147	264	411	481

== Goaltending statistics ==
Name	Games	Minutes	Wins	Losses	Ties	Goals against	Saves	Shut outs	SV %	GAA
Trey Augustine	35	2086:41	23	9	2	103	1113	3	.915	2.96
Luca Di Pasquo	5	223:38	2	1	1	9	91	0	.910	2.41
Jon Mor	5	0:26	0	0	0	0	0	0	–	0.00
Empty Net	-	10:47	-	-	-	5	-	-	-	-
Total	38	2321:32	25	10	3	117	1204	3	.911	3.02

== Rankings ==
Poll	Week																										
Poll	Pre	1	2	3	4	5	6	7	8	9	10	11	12	13	14	15	16	17	18	19	20	21	22	23	24	25	26 (Final)
USCHO.com	9	8	8	8	12	11	11	7	8	7	7	–	8	8	7 (1)	8	8	9	6	4т	6	6	4	5	4	–	5
USA Hockey	9	8	9	7	12	11	11	7	7	7	7	7	7^	8	5	7	8	8	5т	4	6	5	4	5	4	5	5

Note: USCHO did not release a poll in weeks 11 and 25.
Note: USA Hockey did not release a poll in week 12.

== Awards and honors ==
Player	Award	Ref
Artyom Levshunov	AHCA West Second Team All-American	
Artyom Levshunov	Big Ten Men's Ice Hockey Defensive Player of the Year	
Artyom Levshunov	Big Ten Men's Ice Hockey Freshman of the Year	
Adam Nightingale	Big Ten Men's Ice Hockey Coach of the Year	
Trey Augustine	Big Ten Tournament Most Outstanding Player	
Artyom Levshunov	Big Ten First Team	
Trey Augustine	Big Ten Second Team	
Trey Augustine	Big Ten Freshman Team	
Artyom Levshunov	Big Ten Freshman Team	
Trey Augustine	Big Ten All-Tournament Team	
Nash Nienhuis	Big Ten All-Tournament Team	
Daniel Russell	Big Ten All-Tournament Team	

== 2024 NHL entry draft ==
Round	Pick	Player	NHL team
1	2	Artyom Levshunov	Chicago Blackhawks
6	172	Patrick Geary	Buffalo Sabres
7	197	Lucas Van Vliet ^{†}	Vegas Golden Knights
7	203	Austin Baker ^{†}	Detroit Red Wings

† incoming freshman
