= 2023–24 Ohio State Buckeyes men's ice hockey season =

Ice hockey team season

- Conference: 7th Big Ten
- Home ice: Value City Arena

Rankings
- USCHO: NR
- USA Hockey: NR

Record
- Overall: 14–20–4
- Conference: 4–18–2
- Home: 8–8–2
- Road: 6–12–2

Coaches and captains
- Head coach: Steve Rohlik
- Assistant coaches: J. B. Bittner; Paul Kirtland; Nate Guenin
- Captain(s): Scooter Brickley; Patrick Guzzo
- Alternate captain(s): Matt Cassidy; Cam Theising

The 2023–24 Ohio State Buckeyes men's ice hockey season was the 61st season for the program and 11th season in the Big Ten Conference. The Buckeyes represented the Ohio State University in the 2023-24 NCAA Division I men's ice hockey season, played their home games at Value City Arena and were coached by Steve Rohlik in his 11th season.

== Season ==
After falling to the Quinnipiac Bobcats in the second round of the 2023 NCAA Division tournament, the Buckeyes looked to build upon the success they had in previous seasons.

Although the Buckeyes brought in 16 new players through either the transfer portal or out of high school, they still went into the season losing some big names. Among these were goaltender Jakub Dobeš, who had served as the starter for the previous two seasons, and captain Gustaf Westlund. They also lost defensemen Cole McWard and Mason Lohrei to professional contracts. The departures highlighted a successful period in Buckeye hockey in terms of recruitment and regular season success. Among notable additions to the team was transfer Jake Dunlap, who joined his brother Joe Dunlap on the Buckeyes.

As expected, the Buckeyes started off in the middle of the pack in the rankings, being ranked 13th and 15th by USCHO.com and USA Hockey, respectively. Although a 3-1-3 start would allow them be ranked as high as 13th in both polls in Week 4, things would quickly get worse for the Buckeyes from there. Between November 3rd and December 9th, the Buckeyes would only win two games - non-conference games against Princeton. This would drop their record 5-8-4, including a 0-8-2 record in Big Ten play. This slide would knock them out of both USCHO.com and USA Hockey rankings by Week 6.

The Buckeyes would finally register their first season win against a Big Ten opponent on January 12, 2024 against Notre Dame. Unfortunately, this wouldn't spark anything for the team, as they would lose seven straight afterwards, all against Big Ten teams. However, after the losing streak, the Buckeyes would be rattle off three straight upset wins against the #4 ranked team, the first two against the Wisconsin Badgers, and one against the Michigan State Spartans. They would lose the final three games of the season, bringing their regular season record to 12-18-4, and an abysmal 4-18-2 in inter-conference play. It was their worst conference record since they joined the conference and worst since 1994–95.

The Buckeyes, unsurprisingly, entered the 2024 Big Ten tournament as the worst-seeded #7 team, and would face off against #2 seeded Wisconsin, who was ranked #5 overall. The Buckeyes would stun the Badgers and they won the series 2-1, moving on to face the top seeded Spartans. Despite a good effort against the top-seeded Spartans, the Buckeyes would fall 2-1, ending their season.

== Departures ==
Player	Position	Nationality	Cause
Mark Cheremeta	Forward	United States	Transferred to Sacred Heart
Jakub Dobeš	Goaltender	Czech Republic	Signed professional contract (Montreal Canadiens)
Tyler Duke	Defenseman	United States	Transferred to Michigan
Jaedon Leslie	Forward	Canada	Graduate transfer to Niagara
Mason Lohrei	Defenseman	United States	Signed professional contract (Boston Bruins)
James Marooney	Defenseman	United States	Graduate transfer to St. Thomas
Cole McWard	Defenseman	United States	Signed professional contract (Vancouver Canucks)
Evan McIntyre	Defenseman	Canada	Transferred to Augustana
C. J. Regula	Defenseman	United States	Graduate transfer to Rensselaer
Kamil Sadlocha	Forward	United States	Graduation (signed with TH Unia Oświęcim)
Tate Singleton	Forward	Canada	Graduation (signed with Toronto Marlies)
Ryan Snowden	Goaltender	United States	Graduation (retired)
Travis Treloar	Forward	Sweden	Transferred to Quinnipiac
Dom Vidoli	Defenseman	United States	Graduate transfer to Omaha
Gustaf Westlund	Forward	Sweden	Graduation (signed with IK Oskarshamn)
Jake Wise	Forward	United States	Graduation (signed with Charlotte Checkers)

== Recruiting ==
Player	Position	Nationality	Age	Notes
Caden Brown	Forward	United States	20	St. Louis, MO; transfer from Wisconsin
Damien Carfagna	Defenseman	United States	20	Wood Ridge, NJ; transfer from New Hampshire
Samuel Deckhut	Forward	United States	21	San Diego, CA
Jake Dunlap	Forward	United States	21	Windham, NH; transfer from New Hampshire
Kristoffer Eberly	Goaltender	United States	20	Pinckney, MI
Ryan Gordon	Forward	United States	21	Duluth, GA
Riley Hughes	Forward	United States	23	Westwood, MA; graduate transfer from Northeastern; selected 216th overall in 2018
Brent Johnson	Defenseman	United States	20	Dallas, TX; transfer from North Dakota; selected 80th overall in 2021
Mason Klee	Defenseman	United States	23	Morrison, CO; graduate transfer from Rensselaer
Nathan McBrayer	Defenseman	United States	19	Columbus, OH
Max Montes	Forward	United States	20	Waukesha, WI
William Smith	Defenseman	Canada	20	Toronto, ON
Logan Terness	Goaltender	Canada	21	Burnaby, BC; transfer from Connecticut
Theo Wallberg	Defenseman	Sweden	19	Stockholm, SWE; selected 168th overall in 2022
Thomas Weis	Forward	United States	21	Madison, WI

== Roster ==
As of July 6, 2023.

No.	Nat.	Player	Class	Pos	Height	Weight	DoB	Hometown	Previous team	NHL rights
1	(Canada)	Logan Terness	Junior	G	6' 0" (1.83 m)	175 lb (79 kg)	2002-09-01	North Vancouver, British Columbia	Connecticut (HEA)	—
2	(United States)	Nathan McBrayer	Freshman	D	6' 0" (1.83 m)	173 lb (78 kg)	2004-05-11	Columbus, Ohio	Muskegon Lumberjacks (USHL)	—
4	(United States)	John Larkin	Sophomore	D	6' 2" (1.88 m)	190 lb (86 kg)	2001-01-26	Northville, Michigan	Austin Bruins (NAHL)	—
6	(United States)	Mason Klee	Graduate	D	6' 2" (1.88 m)	195 lb (88 kg)	1999-10-04	Morrison, Colorado	Rensselaer (ECAC)	—
7	(United States)	Brent Johnson	Junior	D	6' 0" (1.83 m)	185 lb (84 kg)	2003-03-20	Dallas, Texas	North Dakota (NCHC)	WSH, 80th overall 2021
8	(United States)	Scooter Brickey (C)	Graduate	D	6' 4" (1.93 m)	215 lb (98 kg)	1999-05-27	Burtchville, Michigan	Western Michigan (NCHC)	—
9	(United States)	Riley Hughes	Graduate	F	6' 2" (1.88 m)	195 lb (88 kg)	2000-06-27	Westwood, Massachusetts	Northeastern (ECAC)	NYR, 216th overall 2018
10	(United States)	Thomas Weis	Freshman	F	5' 9" (1.75 m)	170 lb (77 kg)	2002-02-08	Madison, Wisconsin	Madison Capitols (USHL)	—
12	(United States)	Caden Brown	Junior	D	5' 11" (1.8 m)	185 lb (84 kg)	2003-06-22	St. Louis, Missouri	Waterloo Black Hawks (USHL)	—
14	(United States)	Dalton Messina	Graduate	F	5' 11" (1.8 m)	195 lb (88 kg)	1998-03-29	Macomb, Michigan	Youngstown Phantoms (USHL)	—
15	(United States)	Cam Thiesing (A)	Junior	F	6' 0" (1.83 m)	184 lb (83 kg)	2001-03-26	Nashville, Tennessee	Green Bay Gamblers (USHL)	—
16	(United States)	Max Montes	Freshman	F	5' 8" (1.73 m)	165 lb (75 kg)	2003-09-01	Waukesha, Wisconsin	Dubuque Fighting Saints (USHL)	—
18	(United States)	Michael Gildon	Senior	F	6' 2" (1.88 m)	196 lb (89 kg)	2001-06-21	Plano, Texas	USNTDP (USHL)	—
19	(United States)	Stephen Halliday	Sophomore	F	6' 4" (1.93 m)	210 lb (95 kg)	2002-07-02	Glenwood, Maryland	Dubuque Fighting Saints (USHL)	OTT, 104th overall 2022
20	(United States)	Matt Cassidy (A)	Graduate	F	6' 0" (1.83 m)	187 lb (85 kg)	1999-07-31	Medford, New Jersey	Youngstown Phantoms (USHL)	—
21	(United States)	Joe Dunlap	Senior	F	6' 0" (1.83 m)	185 lb (84 kg)	1999-11-30	Windham, New Hampshire	Fargo Force (USHL)	—
23	(United States)	Davis Burnside	Sophomore	F	6' 0" (1.83 m)	176 lb (80 kg)	2003-09-22	Scottsdale, Arizona	Dubuque Fighting Saints (USHL)	—
25	(United States)	Sam Deckhut	Freshman	F	5' 11" (1.8 m)	186 lb (84 kg)	2002-04-02	San Diego, California	Sioux City Musketeers (USHL)	—
28	(Canada)	William Smith	Freshman	D	6' 1" (1.85 m)	193 lb (88 kg)	2003-03-29	Toronto, Ontario	Omaha Lancers (USHL)	—
29	(United States)	Ryan Gordon	Freshman	F	6' 0" (1.83 m)	185 lb (84 kg)	2002-05-05	Duluth, Georgia	Sioux Falls Stampede (USHL)	—
34	(United States)	Reilly Herbst	Junior	G	6' 0" (1.83 m)	185 lb (84 kg)	2000-02-17	Niwot, Colorado	Omaha Lancers (USHL)	—
44	(Sweden)	Theo Wallberg	Freshman	D	6' 5" (1.96 m)	203 lb (92 kg)	2003-12-04	Stockholm, Sweden	Dubuque Fighting Saints (USHL)	OTT, 168th overall 2022
60	(United States)	Kristoffer Eberly	Freshman	G	6' 4" (1.93 m)	208 lb (94 kg)	2002-12-10	Pinckney, Michigan	Green Bay Gamblers (USHL)	—
71	(United States)	Patrick Guzzo (C)	Senior	F	6' 3" (1.91 m)	198 lb (90 kg)	2001-11-27	Marysville, Michigan	Waterloo Black Hawks (USHL)	—
91	(United States)	Jake Dunlap	Sophomore	F	5' 9" (1.75 m)	175 lb (79 kg)	2001-12-05	Windham, New Hampshire	New Hampshire (HEA)	—
93	(United States)	Damien Carfagna	Sophomore	D	6' 0" (1.83 m)	185 lb (84 kg)	2002-12-12	Wood-Ridge, New Jersey	New Hampshire (HEA)	—

== Standings ==
2023–24 Big Ten ice hockey Standings
	Conference record										Overall record					
	GP	W	L	T	OTW	OTL	3/SW	PTS	GF	GA	GP	W	L	T	GF	GA
#5 Michigan State †*	24	16	6	2	0	1	1	52	92	69	38	25	10	3	147	117
#11 Wisconsin	24	16	7	1	2	2	1	50	81	57	40	26	12	2	128	81
#7 Minnesota	24	13	7	4	3	1	0	41	80	65	39	23	11	5	135	100
#4 Michigan	24	11	11	2	1	1	1	36	85	77	41	23	15	3	169	125
Notre Dame	24	9	13	2	0	1	1	31	66	62	36	15	19	2	101	98
Penn State	24	7	14	3	0	1	2	27	62	92	36	15	18	3	113	130
Ohio State	24	4	18	2	1	0	2	15	50	94	38	14	20	4	100	124
Championship: March 23, 2024 † indicates conference regular season champion * indicates conference tournament champion Rankings: USCHO.com Top 20 Poll; updated April 11, 2024

== Schedule and results ==
Date	Time	Opponent^{#}	Rank^{#}	Site	TV	Decision	Result	Attendance	Record
Regular Season
October 7	7:00 pm	at Mercyhurst*	#13	Mercyhurst Ice Center • Erie, Pennsylvania	FloHockey	Terness	W 4–3	2,050	1–0–0
October 13	7:00 pm	Lindenwood*	#14	Value City Arena • Columbus, Ohio		Terness	W 4–2	2,853	2–0–0
October 14	7:00 pm	Lindenwood*	#14	Value City Arena • Columbus, Ohio		Terness	T 2–2 ^{OT}	2,901	2–0–1
October 20	6:00 pm	at #7 Michigan	#13	Yost Ice Arena • Ann Arbor, Michigan (Rivalry)	BTN	Terness	L 1–7	5,800	2–1–1 (0–1–0)
October 21	7:00 pm	at #7 Michigan	#13	Yost Ice Arena • Ann Arbor, Michigan (Rivalry)	BTN+	Terness	T 2–2 ^{SOW}	5,800	2–1–2 (0–1–1)
October 27	8:07 pm	at #20 Omaha*	#16	Baxter Arena • Omaha, Nebraska		Terness	T 2–2 ^{OT}	6,402	2–1–3
October 28	8:07 pm	at #20 Omaha*	#16	Baxter Arena • Omaha, Nebraska		Terness	W 4–0 ^{OT}	6,254	3–1–3
November 3	7:00 pm	#12 Michigan State	#13	Value City Arena • Columbus, Ohio	BTN+	Terness	L 0–6	4,407	3–2–3 (0–2–1)
November 4	5:00 pm	#12 Michigan State	#13	Value City Arena • Columbus, Ohio	BTN+	Terness	L 4–6	5,121	3–3–3 (0–3–1)
November 10	7:30 pm	at Notre Dame	#19	Compton Family Ice Arena • Notre Dame, Indiana	Peacock	Terness	L 1–4	5,120	3–4–3 (0–4–1)
November 11	6:00 pm	at Notre Dame	#19	Compton Family Ice Arena • Notre Dame, Indiana	Peacock	Terness	L 0–3	5,183	3–5–3 (0–5–1)
November 24	5:00 pm	Princeton*		Value City Arena • Columbus, Ohio		Terness	W 6–3	4,355	4–5–3
November 25	5:00 pm	Princeton*		Value City Arena • Columbus, Ohio		Terness	W 4–3	3,010	5–5–3
December 1	8:00 pm	at #6 Wisconsin		Kohl Center • Madison, Wisconsin	BTN+	Terness	L 0–3	9,859	5–6–3 (0–6–1)
December 2	9:00 pm	at #6 Wisconsin		Kohl Center • Madison, Wisconsin	BTN+	Terness	L 1–6	9,720	5–7–3 (0–7–1)
December 8	6:30 pm	#10 Minnesota		Value City Arena • Columbus, Ohio	BTN	Eberly	L 4–5	4,376	5–8–3 (0–8–1)
December 9	8:00 pm	#10 Minnesota		Value City Arena • Columbus, Ohio	BTN	Eberly	T 1–1 ^{SOW}	4,140	5–8–4 (0–8–2)
December 30	5:00 pm	Mercyhurst*		Value City Arena • Columbus, Ohio		Eberly	W 5–3	5,096	6–8–4
January 5	7:00 pm	Bowling Green*		Value City Arena • Columbus, Ohio		Eberly	W 6–2	5,050	7–8–4
January 6	7:07 pm	at Bowling Green*		Slater Family Ice Arena • Bowling Green, Ohio	FloHockey	Terness	W 4–2	5,000	8–8–4
January 12	7:00 pm	Notre Dame		Value City Arena • Columbus, Ohio	BTN	Terness	W 3–2	5,762	9–8–4 (1–8–2)
January 13	7:00 pm	Notre Dame		Value City Arena • Columbus, Ohio	BTN	Eberly	L 2–5	6,566	9–9–4 (1–9–2)
January 19	8:00 pm	at #10 Minnesota		3M Arena at Mariucci • Minneapolis, Minnesota	Fox 9, BTN+	Terness	L 2–5	10,037	9–10–4 (1–10–2)
January 20	8:00 pm	at #10 Minnesota		3M Arena at Mariucci • Minneapolis, Minnesota	BTN	Terness	L 3–6	9,594	9–11–4 (1–11–2)
January 26	7:00 pm	at Penn State		Pegula Ice Arena • University Park, Pennsylvania	BTN+	Eberly	L 3–4	6,533	9–12–4 (1–12–2)
January 27	6:00 pm	at Penn State		Pegula Ice Arena • University Park, Pennsylvania	BTN+	Eberly	L 3–4	6,578	9–13–4 (1–13–2)
February 2	7:00 pm	#12 Michigan		Value City Arena • Columbus, Ohio (Rivalry)	BTN+	Terness	L 2–4	8,131	9–14–4 (1–14–2)
February 3	8:00 pm	#12 Michigan		Value City Arena • Columbus, Ohio (Rivalry)	BTN	Eberly	L 1–4	8,789	9–15–4 (1–15–2)
February 16	7:00 pm	#4 Wisconsin		Value City Arena • Columbus, Ohio	BTN+	Terness	W 3–2 ^{OT}	6,353	10–15–4 (2–15–2)
February 17	4:30 pm	#4 Wisconsin		Value City Arena • Columbus, Ohio	BTN	Eberly	W 3–1	6,764	11–15–4 (3–15–2)
February 23	7:00 pm	at #4т Michigan State		Munn Ice Arena • East Lansing, Michigan	BTN+	Terness	W 6–2	6,555	12–15–4 (4–15–2)
February 24	6:00 pm	at #4т Michigan State		Munn Ice Arena • East Lansing, Michigan	BTN+	Eberly	L 2–5	6,555	12–16–4 (4–16–2)
March 1	6:00 pm	Penn State		Value City Arena • Columbus, Ohio	BTN	Terness	L 2–5	6,275	12–17–4 (4–17–2)
March 2	5:00 pm	Penn State		Value City Arena • Columbus, Ohio	BTN+	Terness	L 1–2	5,821	12–18–4 (4–18–2)
Big Ten Tournament
March 8	8:00 pm	at #5 Wisconsin*		Kohl Center • Madison, Wisconsin (Quarterfinal Game 1)	BTN+	Terness	W 3–1	8,873	13–18–4
March 9	7:00 pm	at #5 Wisconsin*		Kohl Center • Madison, Wisconsin (Quarterfinal Game 2)	BTN+	Eberly	L 2–4	10,837	13–19–4
March 10	6:00 pm	at #5 Wisconsin*		Kohl Center • Madison, Wisconsin (Quarterfinal Game 3)	BTN+	Terness	W 3–1	7,994	14–19–4
March 16	6:30 pm	at #4 Michigan State*		Munn Ice Arena • East Lansing, Michigan (Semifinal)	BTN	Terness	L 1–2	6,555	14–20–4
*Non-conference game. ^{#}Rankings from USCHO.com Poll. All times are in Eastern Time. Source:

== Scoring statistics ==
Name	Position	Games	Goals	Assists	Points	PIM
Stephen Halliday	C	38	10	26	36	30
Scooter Brickey	D	37	13	13	26	32
Davis Burnside	F	38	9	17	26	32
Theo Wallberg	D	38	2	19	21	16
Max Montes	F	37	9	9	18	17
Cam Thiesing	C	31	9	7	16	55
Patrick Guzzo	C	38	8	7	15	15
Dalton Messina	F	38	6	8	14	20
Brent Johnson	D	37	5	8	13	8
Thomas Weis	C	37	4	7	11	33
Michael Gildon	LW	34	5	5	10	27
Cade Brown	C	24	4	6	10	6
Joseph Dunlap	F	13	3	5	8	40
Jake Dunlap	F	33	3	5	8	40
Nathan McBrayer	D	34	0	7	7	8
Sam Deckhut	C	29	3	3	6	2
Damien Carfagna	D	34	2	4	6	10
Riley Hughes	RW	23	1	4	5	19
William Smith	D	32	1	4	5	22
Mason Klee	D	38	1	4	5	25
Ryan Gordon	C	30	1	2	3	4
John Larkin	D	3	1	0	1	6
Reilly Herbst	G	2	0	0	0	0
Kristoffer Eberly	G	14	0	0	0	0
Matt Cassidy	RW	24	0	0	0	24
Logan Terness	G	27	0	0	0	0
Total			100	170	270	464

== Goaltending statistics ==
Name	Games	Minutes	Wins	Losses	Ties	Goals against	Saves	Shut outs	SV %	GAA
Kristoffer Eberly	15	725:25	3	8	1	36	368	0	.911	2.98
Logan Terness	27	1529:14	11	12	3	79	741	1	.904	3.10
Reilly Herbst	3	24:27	0	0	0	3	13	0	.813	7.36
Empty Net	-	25:32	-	-	-	6	-	-	-	-
Total	38	2304:38	14	20	4	124	1122	1	.900	3.23

== Rankings ==
Poll	Week																										
Poll	Pre	1	2	3	4	5	6	7	8	9	10	11	12	13	14	15	16	17	18	19	20	21	22	23	24	25	26 (Final)
USCHO.com	13	14	13	16	13	19	NR	NR	NR	NR	NR	–	NR	NR	NR	NR	NR	NR	NR	NR	NR	NR	NR	NR	NR	–	NR
USA Hockey	15	14	13	15	13	19	NR	NR	NR	NR	NR	NR	–	NR	NR	NR	NR	NR	NR	NR	NR	NR	NR	NR	NR	NR	NR

Note: USCHO did not release a poll in weeks 11 and 25.
Note: USA Hockey did not release a poll in week 12.

== Awards and honors ==
Player	Award	Ref
Scooter Brickey	Big Ten Second Team	

== 2024 NHL entry draft ==
Round	Pick	Player	NHL team
5	148	Noah Powell ^{†}	Detroit Red Wings

† incoming freshman
