= 2023–24 Penn State Nittany Lions men's ice hockey season =

Sports season

- Conference: 6th Big Ten
- Home ice: Pegula Ice Arena

Rankings
- USCHO: NR
- USA Hockey: NR

Record
- Overall: 15–18–3
- Conference: 7–14–3
- Home: 9–8–2
- Road: 6–10–1

Coaches and captains
- Head coach: Guy Gadowsky
- Assistant coaches: Keith Fisher; Juliano Pagliero; Andrew Sturtz
- Captain: Christian Berger
- Alternate captain(s): Xander Lamppa; Christian Sarlo

The 2023–24 Penn State Nittany Lions men's ice hockey season was the 18th season of play for the program and 11th in the Big Ten Conference. The Nittany Lions represented Penn State University in the 2023–24 NCAA Division I men's ice hockey season, played their home games at Pegula Ice Arena and were coached by Guy Gadowsky in his 12th season.

== Season ==
In losing their top four scorers from the previous season, Penn State was looking for offense from new quarters. Despite this, the Nittany Lions looked good in the early part of the season when they opened with a 5–2 record in October. While a few cracks were shown on the defensive end, the good non conference record gave Penn State a solid foundation. Unfortunately, as soon as they started their Big Ten schedule, the flaws began to grow. Goaltending became an issue that would not go away thanks in large part due to the flagging play of Liam Soulière. The senior netminder couldn't keep the puck out of the net and saw his goals against average swell by nearly a full point. Backup Noah Grannan wasn't any better and the team had to contend with constantly needing to score goals. From the beginning of November until the end of February, Penn State allowed at least 3 goals against in 22 of 25 games. While the offense did get contributions from new quarters, particularly from freshman Aiden Fink, they weren't able to overcome the worst defense in the Big Ten.

Penn State ended the first half of the season with a winning record thanks entirely to its non-conference slate. After Christmas, with almost only Big Ten opponents remaining, the team sank below .500. The only saving grace for the Nittany Lions was a season sweep of Ohio State that prevented the club from finishing dead last in the conference. The struggles against conference opponents was not entirely unexpected as the Big Ten was one of the best leagues in '24, however, that didn't bode well for their postseason chances as the only way to reach the national tournament was to win a conference championship.

The first hurdle in their way was Minnesota and the game did not go in Penn State's favor. As they had over much of the second half of the season, the Lions could not generate enough offense against a strong team to overcome a poor performance in goal. The team fought back hard in the rematch and overcame a 2-goal deficit with a strong second period to tie the match. Penn State then outshot Minnesota 20–4 in the third but they could not get a further goal. Instead, with just over a minute remaining, Soulière surrendered the winning goal and Penn State's lackluster season came to an abrupt end.

== Departures ==
Player	Position	Nationality	Cause
Ashton Calder	Forward	United States	Graduation (signed with Florida Everblades)
Ben Copeland	Forward	United States	Graduation (signed with Cleveland Monsters)
Paul DeNaples	Defenseman	United States	Graduation (signed with HC TPS)
Tyler Gratton	Forward	United States	Graduate transfer to Arizona State
Kenny Johnson	Defenseman	United States	Graduation (signed with Wheeling Nailers)
Ture Linden	Forward	United States	Graduation (signed with Ontario Reign)
Connor MacEachern	Forward	Canada	Graduation (signed with San Jose Barracuda)
Connor McMenamin	Forward	United States	Graduate transfer to Minnesota Duluth
Kevin Wall	Forward	United States	Graduation (signed with Milwaukee Admirals)

== Recruiting ==
Player	Position	Nationality	Age	Notes
Casey Aman	Defenseman	United States	20	Johnstown, PA
Jacques Bouquot	Forward	United States	23	Columbus, OH; graduate transfer from Vermont
Matthew DiMarsico	Forward	United States	19	Wexford, PA
Dane Dowiak	Forward	United States	21	Wexford, PA
Aiden Fink	Forward	Canada	18	Calgary, AB; selected 218th overall in 2023
Reese Laubach	Forward	United States	19	San Jose, CA; selected 217th overall in 2022
Tanner Palocsik	Defenseman	United States	24	Aliquippa, PA; graduate transfer from Dartmouth

== Roster ==
As of July 24, 2023.

No.	Nat.	Player	Class	Pos	Height	Weight	DoB	Hometown	Previous team	NHL rights
2	(United States)	Carter Schade	Sophomore	D	5' 11" (1.8 m)	185 lb (84 kg)	2003-03-07	Mars, Pennsylvania	Lincoln Stars (USHL)	—
3	(United States)	Casey Aman	Freshman	D	6' 0" (1.83 m)	185 lb (84 kg)	2003-01-15	Johnstown, Pennsylvania	Powell River Kings (BCHL)	—
4	(Canada)	Simon Mack	Junior	D	5' 10" (1.78 m)	180 lb (82 kg)	2001-03-29	Brockville, Ontario	Des Moines Buccaneers (USHL)	—
5	(United States)	Christian Berger (C)	Senior	D	6' 0" (1.83 m)	182 lb (83 kg)	2000-05-22	St. Louis, Missouri	Omaha Lancers (USHL)	—
6	(United States)	Jimmy Dowd Jr.	Senior	D	5' 9" (1.75 m)	161 lb (73 kg)	2000-07-09	Point Pleasant Beach, New Jersey	Chicago Steel (USHL)	—
7	(Canada)	Carson Dyck	Junior	F	6' 0" (1.83 m)	180 lb (82 kg)	2001-06-07	Lethbridge, Alberta	Okotoks Oilers (AJHL)	—
8	(United States)	Alex Servagno	Sophomore	F	5' 9" (1.75 m)	170 lb (77 kg)	2002-06-16	Gibsonia, Pennsylvania	Green Bay Gamblers (USHL)	—
9	(United States)	Xander Lamppa (A)	Senior	F	6' 1" (1.85 m)	205 lb (93 kg)	2000-04-30	Rochester, Minnesota	Waterloo Black Hawks (USHL)	—
10	(United States)	Christian Sarlo (A)	Senior	F	6' 0" (1.83 m)	188 lb (85 kg)	2001-06-29	Lynbrook, New York	Lincoln Stars (USHL)	—
11	(United States)	Ryan Kirwan	Junior	F	6' 2" (1.88 m)	195 lb (88 kg)	2002-02-27	DeWitt, New York	Green Bay Gamblers (USHL)	—
12	(United States)	Ben Schoen	Junior	F	5' 8" (1.73 m)	150 lb (68 kg)	2002-05-18	Maumee, Ohio	Tri-City Storm (USHL)	—
13	(United States)	Danny Dzhaniyev	Junior	F	5' 5" (1.65 m)	150 lb (68 kg)	2002-09-15	Brooklyn, New York	Dubuque Fighting Saints (USHL)	—
14	(United States)	Matt DiMarsico	Freshman	F	6' 0" (1.83 m)	180 lb (82 kg)	2004-01-07	Wexford, Pennsylvania	Green Bay Gamblers (USHL)	—
16	(United States)	Dylan Lugris	Junior	F	6' 2" (1.88 m)	185 lb (84 kg)	2001-06-23	Buffalo, New York	Jersey Hitmen (NCDC)	—
17	(United States)	Chase McLane	Senior	F	6' 2" (1.88 m)	183 lb (83 kg)	2000-04-22	Trenton, Michigan	Tri-City Storm (USHL)	NSH, 209th overall 2020
18	(Canada)	Aiden Fink	Freshman	F	5' 10" (1.78 m)	160 lb (73 kg)	2004-11-24	Calgary, Alberta	Brooks Bandits (AJHL)	NSH, 218th overall 2023
19	(United States)	Dane Dowiak	Freshman	F	5' 10" (1.78 m)	180 lb (82 kg)	2002-03-27	Pittsburgh, Pennsylvania	Tri-City Storm (USHL)	—
22	(United States)	Tanner Palocsik	Graduate	D	5' 11" (1.8 m)	190 lb (86 kg)	1999-05-26	Aliquippa, Pennsylvania	Dartmouth (ECAC)	—
23	(United States)	Tyler Paquette	Senior	F	6' 3" (1.91 m)	200 lb (91 kg)	2001-03-18	Collegeville, Pennsylvania	Green Bay Gamblers (USHL)	—
24	(United States)	Jarod Crespo	Sophomore	D	6' 0" (1.83 m)	190 lb (86 kg)	2002-04-30	Seven Lakes, North Carolina	Green Bay Gamblers (USHL)	—
25	(United States)	Dylan Gratton	Sophomore	D	6' 0" (1.83 m)	180 lb (82 kg)	2003-02-25	Pottstown, Pennsylvania	Sioux City Musketeers (USHL)	—
27	(United States)	Jacques Bouquot	Freshman	F	6' 2" (1.88 m)	190 lb (86 kg)	2000-02-10	South Windsor, Connecticut	Vermont (HEA)	—
29	(United States)	Reese Laubach	Freshman	F	6' 0" (1.83 m)	170 lb (77 kg)	2003-11-20	San Jose, California	Omaha Lancers (USHL)	SJS, 217th overall 2022
30	(United States)	Doug Dorr Jr.	Senior	G	6' 4" (1.93 m)	200 lb (91 kg)	1999-05-07	Pittsburgh, Pennsylvania	Utica Jr. Comets (NCDC)	—
31	(Canada)	Liam Soulière	Senior	G	5' 11" (1.8 m)	180 lb (82 kg)	1999-03-16	Brampton, Ontario	Victoria Grizzlies (BCHL)	—
33	(United States)	Noah Grannan	Sophomore	G	6' 2" (1.88 m)	190 lb (86 kg)	2002-04-27	Germantown, Wisconsin	Sioux Falls Stampede (USHL)	—

== Standings ==
2023–24 Big Ten ice hockey Standings
	Conference record										Overall record					
	GP	W	L	T	OTW	OTL	3/SW	PTS	GF	GA	GP	W	L	T	GF	GA
#5 Michigan State †*	24	16	6	2	0	1	1	52	92	69	38	25	10	3	147	117
#11 Wisconsin	24	16	7	1	2	2	1	50	81	57	40	26	12	2	128	81
#7 Minnesota	24	13	7	4	3	1	0	41	80	65	39	23	11	5	135	100
#4 Michigan	24	11	11	2	1	1	1	36	85	77	41	23	15	3	169	125
Notre Dame	24	9	13	2	0	1	1	31	66	62	36	15	19	2	101	98
Penn State	24	7	14	3	0	1	2	27	62	92	36	15	18	3	113	130
Ohio State	24	4	18	2	1	0	2	15	50	94	38	14	20	4	100	124
Championship: March 23, 2024 † indicates conference regular season champion * indicates conference tournament champion Rankings: USCHO.com Top 20 Poll; updated April 11, 2024

== Schedule and results ==
Date	Time	Opponent^{#}	Rank^{#}	Site	TV	Decision	Result	Attendance	Record
Regular Season
October 7	7:30 pm	at LIU*	#16	Northwell Health Ice Center • East Meadow, New York	ESPN+	Soulière	W 3–2	1,862	1–0–0
October 13	7:00 pm	at Clarkson*	#18	Cheel Arena • Potsdam, New York	ESPN+	Soulière	W 4–2	3,177	2–0–0
October 14	7:00 pm	at St. Lawrence*	#18	Appleton Arena • Canton, New York	ESPN+	Soulière	W 4–1	1,223	3–0–0
October 20	7:00 pm	American International*	#12	Pegula Ice Arena • University Park, Pennsylvania		Soulière	W 3–2	6,170	4–0–0
October 21	5:07 pm	American International*	#12	Pegula Ice Arena • University Park, Pennsylvania		Grannan	L 4–6	6,318	4–1–0
October 26	7:00 pm	Alaska Anchorage*	#15	Pegula Ice Arena • University Park, Pennsylvania		Grannan	W 2–1	6,127	5–1–0
October 27	7:00 pm	Alaska Anchorage*	#15	Pegula Ice Arena • University Park, Pennsylvania		Soulière	L 5–6	6,365	5–2–0
November 4	7:30 pm	Notre Dame	#17	Pegula Ice Arena • University Park, Pennsylvania	BTN+	Grannan	T 3–3 ^{SOL}	6,499	5–2–1 (0–0–1)
November 5	4:30 pm	Notre Dame	#17	Pegula Ice Arena • University Park, Pennsylvania	BTN	Soulière	T 2–2 ^{SOW}	6,262	5–2–2 (0–0–2)
November 10	7:00 pm	at #11 Michigan State	#17	Munn Ice Arena • East Lansing, Michigan	BTN+	Grannan	T 3–3 ^{SOW}	6,200	5–2–3 (0–0–3)
November 11	4:00 pm	at #11 Michigan State	#17	Munn Ice Arena • East Lansing, Michigan	BTN+	Soulière	L 3–5	6,288	5–3–3 (0–1–3)
November 17	7:00 pm	at #12 Michigan	#18	Yost Ice Arena • Ann Arbor, Michigan	BTN+	Grannan	L 4–6	5,800	5–4–3 (0–2–3)
November 18	7:00 pm	at #12 Michigan	#18	Yost Ice Arena • Ann Arbor, Michigan	BTN+	Soulière	W 5–3	5,800	6–4–3 (1–2–3)
November 24	4:00 pm	Lindenwood*	#19	Pegula Ice Arena • University Park, Pennsylvania		Soulière	W 9–3	5,641	7–4–3
November 25	4:00 pm	Lindenwood*	#19	Pegula Ice Arena • University Park, Pennsylvania		Grannan	W 7–1	5,802	8–4–3
December 1	7:00 pm	#7 Minnesota	#18	Pegula Ice Arena • University Park, Pennsylvania	BTN+	Soulière	L 1–4	6,300	8–5–3 (1–3–3)
December 2	6:00 pm	#7 Minnesota	#18	Pegula Ice Arena • University Park, Pennsylvania	BTN	Grannan	W 6–3	6,421	9–5–3 (2–3–3)
December 8	9:00 pm	at #6 Wisconsin	#17	Kohl Center • Madison, Wisconsin	BTN	Grannan	L 3–6	7,470	9–6–3 (2–4–3)
December 9	8:00 pm	at #6 Wisconsin	#17	Kohl Center • Madison, Wisconsin	BTN+	Soulière	L 1–4	9,490	9–7–3 (2–5–3)
January 6	6:00 pm	Army*	#19	Pegula Ice Arena • University Park, Pennsylvania		Soulière	W 7–6	6,078	10–7–3
January 12	7:00 pm	#8 Michigan State	#20	Pegula Ice Arena • University Park, Pennsylvania	BTN	Soulière	L 0–5	6,349	10–8–3 (2–6–3)
January 13	4:30 pm	#8 Michigan State	#20	Pegula Ice Arena • University Park, Pennsylvania	BTN	Soulière	L 3–7	6,483	10–9–3 (2–7–3)
January 19	7:30 pm	at Notre Dame		Compton Family Ice Arena • Notre Dame, Indiana	Peacock	Grannan	L 1–4	5,151	10–10–3 (2–8–3)
January 20	6:00 pm	at Notre Dame		Compton Family Ice Arena • Notre Dame, Indiana	Peacock	Soulière	L 3–6	5,354	10–11–3 (2–9–3)
January 26	7:00 pm	Ohio State		Pegula Ice Arena • University Park, Pennsylvania	BTN+	Soulière	W 4–3	6,533	11–11–3 (3–9–3)
January 27	6:00 pm	Ohio State		Pegula Ice Arena • University Park, Pennsylvania	BTN+	Soulière	W 4–3	6,578	12–11–3 (4–9–3)
February 9	7:00 pm	at #8 Minnesota		3M Arena at Mariucci • Minneapolis, Minnesota	FS1	Soulière	L 0–3	10,750	12–12–3 (4–10–3)
February 10	4:00 pm	at #8 Minnesota		3M Arena at Mariucci • Minneapolis, Minnesota	BTN	Soulière	L 0–3	10,560	12–13–3 (4–11–3)
February 16	7:00 pm	#14 Michigan		Pegula Ice Arena • University Park, Pennsylvania	BTN+	Soulière	L 3–5	6,499	12–14–3 (4–12–3)
February 17	7:00 pm	#14 Michigan		Pegula Ice Arena • University Park, Pennsylvania	BTN	Soulière	W 4–2	6,571	13–14–3 (5–12–3)
February 23	7:00 pm	#6 Wisconsin		Pegula Ice Arena • University Park, Pennsylvania	BTN+	Soulière	L 0–6	6,403	13–15–3 (5–13–3)
February 24	7:00 pm	#6 Wisconsin		Pegula Ice Arena • University Park, Pennsylvania	BTN+	Soulière	L 2–3	6,569	13–16–3 (5–16–3)
March 1	6:00 pm	at Ohio State		Value City Arena • Columbus, Ohio	BTN	Soulière	W 5–2	6,275	14–16–3 (6–16–3)
March 2	5:00 pm	at Ohio State		Value City Arena • Columbus, Ohio	BTN+	Soulière	W 2–1	5,821	15–16–3 (7–16–3)
Big Ten Tournament
March 8	7:00 pm	at #8 Minnesota*		3M Arena at Mariucci • Minneapolis, Minnesota (Quarterfinal Game 1)	FS2	Soulière	L 1–5	4,296	15–17–3
March 9	4:30 pm	at #8 Minnesota*		3M Arena at Mariucci • Minneapolis, Minnesota (Quarterfinal Game 2)	FS2	Soulière	L 2–3	5,363	15–18–3
*Non-conference game. ^{#}Rankings from USCHO.com Poll. All times are in Eastern Time. Source:

== Scoring statistics ==
Name	Position	Games	Goals	Assists	Points	PIM
Aiden Fink	RW	34	15	19	34	27
Danny Dzhaniyev	F	33	9	20	29	6
Jacques Bouquot	C/LW	34	12	15	27	22
Ryan Kirwan	LW	36	13	13	26	10
Matt DiMarsico	F	35	7	19	26	18
Reese Laubach	C	35	10	12	22	48
Simon Mack	D	36	4	12	16	0
Xander Lamppa	F	35	3	13	16	40
Tanner Palocsik	D	36	2	14	16	8
Dylan Lugris	F	36	8	6	14	4
Dylan Gratton	D	36	3	10	13	26
Jimmy Dowd	D	28	2	11	13	26
Dane Dowiak	C/LW	31	6	5	11	24
Tyler Paquette	C/RW	27	6	3	9	8
Jarod Crespo	D	35	3	5	8	24
Christian Sarlo	F	25	2	6	8	2
Chase McLane	C/RW	17	3	3	6	11
Alex Servagno	F	30	2	4	6	2
Christian Berger	D	30	2	4	6	6
Casey Aman	D	20	1	1	2	2
Carson Dyck	F	30	0	2	2	16
Noah Grannan	G	11	0	0	0	0
Carter Schade	D	21	0	0	0	15
Liam Soulière	G	28	0	0	0	0
Total			113	197	310	331

== Goaltending statistics ==
Name	Games	Minutes	Wins	Losses	Ties	Goals against	Saves	Shut outs	SV %	GAA
Noah Grannan	11	523:08	3	4	2	29	223	0	.885	3.33
Liam Soulière	29	1631:01	12	14	1	92	637	0	.874	3.38
Empty Net	-	23:25	-	-	-	9	-	-	-	-
Total	36	2177:34	15	18	3	130	860	0	.869	3.58

== Rankings ==
Poll	Week																										
Poll	Pre	1	2	3	4	5	6	7	8	9	10	11	12	13	14	15	16	17	18	19	20	21	22	23	24	25	26 (Final)
USCHO.com	16	18	12	15	17	17	18	19	18	17	19	–	19	20	NR	NR	NR	NR	NR	NR	NR	NR	NR	NR	NR	–	NR
USA Hockey	16	17	11	14	17	16	19	19	18	17	18	18	–	19	NR	NR	NR	NR	NR	NR	NR	NR	NR	NR	NR	NR	NR

Note: USCHO did not release a poll in weeks 11 or 25.
Note: USA Hockey did not release a poll in week 12.

== Awards and honors ==
Player	Award	Ref
Aiden Fink	Big Ten Freshman Team	
