= 2024 Big Ten men's ice hockey tournament =

American college hockey tournament

- Dates: March 8–23, 2024
- Teams: 7
- Finals site: Munn Ice Arena; East Lansing, Michigan
- Champions: Michigan State (1st title)
- Winning coach: Adam Nightingale (1st title)
- MVP: Trey Augustine (Michigan State)
- Big Ten men's Ice Hockey Tournaments

The 2024 Big Ten Conference men's ice hockey tournament was the eleventh tournament in conference history. It was played between March 8 and March 23, 2024, on-campus locations. As the tournament winner, Michigan State earned the Big Ten's automatic bid to the 2024 NCAA Division I men's ice hockey tournament.

== Format ==
The tournament featured a format with all games taking place on the campus of the higher-seeded teams. The tournament will open with three best-of-three quarterfinal series, as the second, third and fourth-seeded teams each hosting a series. The top-seeded team will have a bye to the single-elimination semifinals. The highest-seeded team remaining after the semifinals will host the championship game.

== Conference standings ==
2023–24 Big Ten ice hockey Standings
	Conference record										Overall record					
	GP	W	L	T	OTW	OTL	3/SW	PTS	GF	GA	GP	W	L	T	GF	GA
#5 Michigan State †*	24	16	6	2	0	1	1	52	92	69	38	25	10	3	147	117
#11 Wisconsin	24	16	7	1	2	2	1	50	81	57	40	26	12	2	128	81
#7 Minnesota	24	13	7	4	3	1	0	41	80	65	39	23	11	5	135	100
#4 Michigan	24	11	11	2	1	1	1	36	85	77	41	23	15	3	169	125
Notre Dame	24	9	13	2	0	1	1	31	66	62	36	15	19	2	101	98
Penn State	24	7	14	3	0	1	2	27	62	92	36	15	18	3	113	130
Ohio State	24	4	18	2	1	0	2	15	50	94	38	14	20	4	100	124
Championship: March 23, 2024 † indicates conference regular season champion * indicates conference tournament champion Rankings: USCHO.com Top 20 Poll; updated April 11, 2024

== Bracket ==
Teams are reseeded for the semifinals

Quarterfinals; March 8–10
2	Wisconsin	1	4	1
7	Ohio State	3	2	3
3	Minnesota	5	3	—
6	Penn State	1	2	—
4	Michigan	5	4	—
5	Notre Dame	4	3	—

Semifinals; March 16
1	Michigan State	2
7	Ohio State	1
3	Minnesota	1
4	Michigan	2

Championship; March 23
1	Michigan State	5*
4	Michigan	4

Note: * denotes overtime periods.

== Results ==
=== Quarterfinals ===
==== (2) Wisconsin vs. (7) Ohio State ====
March 8	Ohio State	3 – 1	Wisconsin	Kohl Center	Recap
Brent Johnson – (Danny Dzhaniyev, Dylan Lugris) – 9:08		First period	11:40 – William Whitelaw – (Zach Schulz, Christian Fitzgerald)
No scoring		Second period	No scoring
Max Montes – (Brent Johnson, Damien Carfagna) – pp – 2:21; Max Montes – (Michael Gildon, Stephen Halliday) – en – 18:13		Third period	No scoring
Logan Terness (28 saves / 29 shots)		Goalie stats	Kyle McClellan (21 saves / 23 shots)

March 9	Ohio State	2 – 4	Wisconsin	Kohl Center	Recap
Thomas Weis – (Brent Johnson, Johnson, Max Montes) – pp – 19:00		First period	13:07 – pp – Christian Fitzgerald – (David Silye, Cruz Lucius)
No scoring		Second period	3:52 – David Silye – (Cruz Lucius, Daniel Laatsch); 7:02 – pp – Anthony Kehrer – (Owen Mehlenbacher, Simon Tassy)
Patrick Guzzo – (Unassisted) – 9:47		Third period	17:44 – en – Cruz Lucius – (Simon Tassy)
Logan Terness (33 saves / 36 shots)		Goalie stats	Kyle McClellan (37 saves / 39 shots)

March 10	Ohio State	3 – 1	Wisconsin	Kohl Center	Recap
6:16 – pp – Davis Burnside – (Stephen Halliday, Theo Wallberg)		First period	No scoring
10:04 – Scooter Brickey – (Stephen Halliday, Damien Carfagna)		Second period	No scoring
16:57 – en – Davis Burnside – (Unassisted)		Third period	Sawyer Scholl – (Unassisted) – 18:07
Logan Terness (29 saves / 30 shots)		Goalie stats	Kyle McClellan (19 saves / 21 shots)

Ohio State won series 2–1

==== (3) Minnesota vs. (6) Penn State ====
March 8	Penn State	1 – 5	Minnesota	3M Arena at Mariucci	Recap
Jacques Bouquot – (Danny Dzhaniyev, Dylan Lugris) – 10:56		First period	7:21 – Sam Rinzel – (Unassisted)
No scoring		Second period	14:21 – Jimmy Snuggerud – (Jaxon Nelson, Mason Nevers)
No scoring		Third period	2:18 – Aaron Huglen – (Carl Fish, Brody Lamb); 10:43 – Rhett Pitlick – (Cal Thomas, Luke Mittelstadt); 16:59 – en – Rhett Pitlick – (Carl Fish, Justen Close)
Liam Souliere (22 saves / 26 shots)		Goalie stats	Justen Close (20 saves / 21 shots)

March 9	Penn State	2 – 3	Minnesota	3M Arena at Mariucci	Recap
No scoring		First period	1:38 – Jaxon Nelson – (Mike Koster, Jimmy Snuggerud); 13:10 – pp – Jaxon Nelson – (Luke Mittelstadt, Oliver Moore)
Jimmy Dowd, Jr. – (Jacques Bouquot, Danny Dzhaniyev) – 8:59; Matt DiMarsico – (Aiden Fink, Reese Laubach) – 12:53		Second period	No scoring
No scoring		Third period	18:52 – Aaron Huglen – (Brody Lamb)
Liam Souliere (21 saves / 24 shots)		Goalie stats	Justen Close (46 saves / 48 shots)

Minnesota won series 2–0

==== (4) Michigan vs. (5) Notre Dame ====
March 8	Notre Dame	4 – 5	Michigan	Yost Ice Arena	Recap
Landon Slaggert – (Drew Bavaro, Patrick Moynihan) – 5:33		First period	11:11 – pp – Nick Moldenhauer – (Garrett Schifsky, Seamus Casey); 12:41 – Rutger McGroarty – (Garrett Schifsky, Gavin Brindley)
Drew Bavaro – (Hunter Strand, Maddox Fleming) – pp – 12:42; Patrick Moynihan – (Cole Knuble) – 15:02; Drew Bavaro – (Jayden Davis) – 16:00		Second period	17:04 – Garrett Schifsky – (Jacob Truscott, Seamus Casey)
No scoring		Third period	0:11 – pp – T.J. Hughes – (Seamus Casey, Gavin Brindley); 3:04 – pp – Rutger McGroarty – (Seamus Casey, T.J. Hughes)
Ryan Bischel (34 saves / 39 shots)		Goalie stats	Jake Barczewski (20 saves / 24 shots)

March 9	Notre Dame	3 – 4	Michigan	Yost Ice Arena	Recap
Drew Bavaro – (Patrick Moynihan) – 8:05		First period	12:09 – pp – T.J. Hughes – (Seamus Casey, Rutger McGroarty); 19:50 – T.J. Hughes – (Rutger McGroarty, Gavin Brindley)
Landon Slaggert – (Patrick Moynihan, Ryan Siedem) – pp – 7:01; Patrick Moynihan – (Landon Slaggert, Ryan Siedem) – 9:27		Second period	11:57 – Dylan Duke – (Josh Eernisse, Frank Nazar)
No scoring		Third period	3:54 – Gavin Brindley – (Tyler Duke, Rutger McGroarty)
Ryan Bischel (32 saves / 36 shots)		Goalie stats	Jake Barczewski (25 saves / 28 shots)

Michigan won series 2–0

=== Semifinals ===
==== (1) Michigan State vs. (7) Ohio State ====
March 16	Ohio State	1 – 2	Michigan State	Munn Ice Arena	Recap
No scoring		First period	No scoring
No scoring		Second period	1:23 – Daniel Russell – (Karsen Dorwart, Isaac Howard)
Max Montes – (Thomas Weis, Jake Dunlap) – 2:16		Third period	2:03 – Nash Nienhuis – (Tanner Kelly)
Logan Terness (36 saves / 38 shots)		Goalie stats	Trey Augustine (37 saves / 38 shots)

==== (3) Minnesota vs. (4) Michigan ====
March 16	Michigan	2 – 1	Minnesota	3M Arena at Mariucci	Recap
Kienan Draper – (Chase Pletzke, Seamus Casey) – 3:12		First period	No scoring
Gavin Brindley – (Marshall Warren, Rutger McGroarty) – 18:36		Second period	No scoring
No scoring		Third period	18:31 – Jimmy Snuggerud – (Ryan Chesley, Luke Mittelstadt)
Jake Barczewski (23 saves / 24 shots)		Goalie stats	Justen Close (29 saves / 31 shots)

=== Championship ===
==== (4) Michigan vs. (1) Michigan State ====
March 23	Michigan	4 – 5	OT	Michigan State	Munn Ice Arena	Recap
Frank Nazar – (Josh Eernisse, Marshall Warren) – 0:58		First period		10:53 – Tanner Kelly – (Tiernan Shoudy)
Dylan Duke – (Rutger McGroarty, Seamus Casey) – pp – 12:50; Marshall Warren – (Philippe Lapointe, Nick Moldenhauer)		Second period		10:48 – Daniel Russell – (Isaac Howard, Nash Nienhuis); 18:41 – Jeremy Davidson – (Nicolas Muller, Artyom Levshunov); 19:59 – Matt Basgall – (Tiernan Shoudy, Patrick Geary)
Frank Nazar – (Dylan Duke, Ethan Edwards) – 2:54		Third period		No scoring
No scoring		First overtime period		13:47 – Patrick Geary – (Reed Lebster, Nicolas Muller)
Jake Barczewski (30 saves / 35 shots)		Goalie stats		Trey Augustine (33 saves / 37 shots)

== Tournament awards ==
=== All-Tournament Team ===
- G: Trey Augustine * (Michigan State)
- D: Seamus Casey (Michigan)
- D: Nash Nienhuis (Michigan State)
- F: Gavin Brindley (Michigan)
- F: Rutger McGroarty (Michigan)
- F: Daniel Russell (Michigan State)

* Most Outstanding Player
