= 2023–24 Wisconsin Badgers men's ice hockey season =

American college ice hockey season

Holiday Face–Off, Champion NCAA Tournament, Regional Semifinal
- Conference: 2nd Big Ten
- Home ice: Kohl Center

Rankings
- USCHO: #11
- USA Hockey: #10

Record
- Overall: 26–12–2
- Conference: 16–7–1
- Home: 14–5–2
- Road: 10–6–0
- Neutral: 2–1–0

Coaches and captains
- Head coach: Mike Hastings
- Assistant coaches: Todd Knott; Nick Oliver; Kevin Murdock
- Captain: Michael Vorlicky
- Alternate captain(s): Anthony Kehrer; Mathieu De St. Phalle

The 2023–24 Wisconsin Badgers men's ice hockey season was the 75th season of play for the program and 23rd in the Big Ten. The Badgers represented the University of Wisconsin–Madison in the 2023–24 NCAA Division I men's ice hockey season, played their home games at Kohl Center and were coached by Mike Hastings in his 1st season.

== Season ==
The program's first season under Mike Hastings promised changes and the roster reflected as much before the opening puck was dropped. Of the eleven new players, five were NHL draft picks. Those new teenagers were augmented by three transfers from Minnesota State, Hastings' previous posting, and would be able to help the Badgers adjust to the new style if nothing else. Critical to Wisconsin's chances was goaltending. Kyle McClellan was the only netminder with any starting experience and he would need to a greater aptitude than he had previously if the Badgers were to wake up from their slumber.

Wisconsin took well to their new system and the team got off to a great start. Scoring seemed to be coming from all quarters, making the Badgers a dangerous team no matter which line was on the ice, but it was in net where the biggest chance was happening. McClellan opened the year with two shutouts, portending great thing for the Badgers. Wisconsin was stymied in the Ice Breaker Final by North Dakota, however, they followed that disappointing loss by winning their next six games, including a sweep of #1 Minnesota to open their conference schedule. The sudden and dramatic turnaround sent Wisconsin rocketing up the national ranking and placed the Badgers at #1 by mid-November. Unfortunately, as soon as they reached the pinnacle, the scoring went through a mini slump and the team lost three games in a row. However, the team recovered by the end of the month and won the next five games to finish out the first half of the season.

With Wisconsin 10 games above .500 by Christmas, the team was almost guaranteed a spot in the NCAA tournament, barring a total collapse. However, not content to rest on its laurels, the team kicked off the second half of the season by winning the Holiday Face–Off, featuring another pair of shutout from McClellan. Three more wins in the first two weeks of 2024 pushed the Badgers up to #3 in the rankings and had them sitting atop the Big Ten standings with Michigan State hot on their heels. A week off in the middle of January seemed to take some of the starch out of Wisconsin's sails and scoring became a bit inconsistent. While McClellan gave his team a chance most nights, the Badgers scoring by committee stopped working. Wisconsin had seven different players finish the year with at least 10 goals, they did not have a top-end scorer who could be counted on to provide goals when the team needed them most. Cruz Lucius led Wisconsin in scoring for the second year in a row but finished the year with only 13 goals. Perhaps the biggest disappointment was Charlie Stramel, who came into the season recovering from an injury and never seemed to get on track. The first-round pick showed some flashes but was largely ineffective for Wisconsin and could only manage 3 goals for the entire season.

While Wisconsin stumbled a bit down the stretch, the team benefitted from having a difficult schedule. The Badgers only dropped a couple spots in the PairWise rankings and remained in the top 10 for the entire second half. The final week of the season saw Wisconsin play Michigan State with 1st-place on the line. The Badgers were 2 points behind the Spartans but with 6 points up for grabs they had ample opportunity to win the regular season title. The teams exchanged leads in the first two periods and entered the third tied at 2-all. Despite outplaying MSU for a great portion of the game, Wisconsin was unable to get a leg up on Michigan State and the Spartans pounced when they had the chance. A third period goal gave MSU a late lead and Wisconsin was forced to pull McClellan for an extra attacker. Two empty-net goals ended the game and sealed the fate of the Badgers. Despite winning the rematch, Wisconsin finished second in the Big Ten and missed out on a quarterfinal bye.

The Team ended the regular season still ranked in the top-5 and were guaranteed a spot in the NCAA tournament no matter what happened in the conference playoffs. However, Wisconsin was again bit by a dearth of scoring. Against Ohio State, the worst team in the Big Ten, Wisconsin was only able to manage a single goal in the first game. The team's power play came up big in the rematch, providing two goals for the effort to even the series. However, the Badgers didn't even get a chance with the man advantage in the rubber match and their only goal came in the waning minutes after they had pulled McClellan. The loses knocked Wisconsin out of the tournament and dropped the team to 8th in the PairWise. While that still gave Wisconsin a #2 seed for the NCAA tournament, it made their first round match that much more difficult.

The Badgers were placed in the East Regional, opposite the defending national champions, Quinnipiac. The team was slow getting out of the gate and only managed to get 4 shots on goal in the first period. A short outburst at the start of the second gave the Badgers a lead but they were unable to sustain any kind of offensive pressure. The Bobcats tied the score goin into the third and it was only through the stellar play of McClellan that they even remained in the game. The Badger defense did its part in holding off Quinnipiac, killing of four separate power plays from the Bobcats (including one in overtime). However, a poor line change near the middle of the fourth period allowed the Bobcats to get a clean breakaway from the blueline in. McClellan bit on the deke and opened up the short-side of the net, allowing the shot to slip past his arm and into the net.

While the end to their season was disappointing, Wisconsin had returned to the national tournament and, perhaps more importantly, gotten back in the good graces of the fans. Wisconsin had only been able to draw about 7,000 fans per game the previous season, well below the capacity of the Kohl Center (~15,000). However, by the end of this season, the team was routinely seeing crowd of over 10,000 for its home games, placing it second in crowd size for the year.

== Departures ==
Player	Position	Nationality	Cause
Brock Caufield	Forward	United States	Graduation (signed with Toronto Marlies)
Corson Ceulemans	Defenseman	Canada	Signed professional contract (Columbus Blue Jackets)
Shay Donovan	Defenseman	United States	Graduate transfer to Augustana
Jack Gorniak	Forward	United States	Graduation (signed with Fort Wayne Komets)
Liam Malmquist	Forward	United States	Transferred to St. Thomas
Dominick Mersch	Forward	Finland	Graduation (signed with Chicago Wolves)
Jared Moe	Goaltender	United States	Graduation (retired)
Robby Newton	Forward	United States	Transferred to Colgate
Ty Smilanic	Forward	United States	Left program (retired)
Zach Urdahl	Defenseman	United States	Transferred to Omaha

== Recruiting ==
Player	Position	Nationality	Age	Notes
Brady Cleveland	Defenseman	United States	18	Wausau, WI; selected 47th overall in 2023
Tyson Dyck	Forward	Canada	19	Abbotsford, BC; transfer from Massachusetts; selected 206th overall in 2022
Quinn Finley	Forward	United States	18	Suamico, WI; selected 78th overall in 2022
Christian Fitzgerald	Forward	Canada	21	Coquitlam, BC; transfer from Minnesota State
William Gramme	Goaltender	Sweden	21	Stockholm, SWE
Owen Mehlenbacher	Forward	Canada	19	Fort Erie, ON; selected 201st overall in 2022
Joe Palodichuk	Defenseman	United States	20	Cottage Grove, MN
Sawyer Scholl	Forward	United States	21	Green Bay, WI
Zach Schulz	Defenseman	United States	18	South Lyon, MI; selected 177th overall in 2023
David Silye	Forward	Canada	24	Arnprior, ON; transfer from Minnesota State
Simon Tassy	Forward	Canada	22	Montreal, QC; transfer from Minnesota State
William Whitelaw	Forward	United States	18	Rosemount, MN; selected 66th overall in 2023

== Roster ==
As of September 15, 2023.

No.	Nat.	Player	Class	Pos	Height	Weight	DoB	Hometown	Previous team	NHL rights
2	(United States)	Daniel Laatsch	Junior	D	6' 5" (1.96 m)	190 lb (86 kg)	2002-02-13	Altoona, Wisconsin	Sioux City Musketeers (USHL)	PIT, 215th overall 2021
3	(United States)	Sam Stange	Senior	F	6' 1" (1.85 m)	208 lb (94 kg)	2001-04-20	Eau Claire, Wisconsin	Sioux Falls Stampede (USHL)	DET, 97th overall 2020
4	(United States)	Ben Dexheimer	Sophomore	D	5' 9" (1.75 m)	172 lb (78 kg)	2002-06-21	Edina, Minnesota	Madison Capitols (USHL)	—
5	(United States)	Zach Schulz	Freshman	D	6' 1" (1.85 m)	185 lb (84 kg)	2005-06-14	South Lyon, Michigan	USNTDP (USHL)	NYI, 177th overall 2023
6	(United States)	Brady Cleveland	Freshman	D	6' 5" (1.96 m)	211 lb (96 kg)	2005-04-01	Wausau, Wisconsin	USNTDP (USHL)	DET, 47th overall 2023
7	(United States)	Mike Vorlicky (C)	Graduate	D	6' 1" (1.85 m)	203 lb (92 kg)	2000-07-17	Edina, Minnesota	Edina High School (USHS–MN)	—
8	(United States)	William Whitelaw	Freshman	F	5' 9" (1.75 m)	173 lb (78 kg)	2005-02-05	Rosemount, Minnesota	Youngstown Phantoms (USHL)	CBJ, 66th overall 2023
9	(United States)	Charlie Stramel	Sophomore	F	6' 3" (1.91 m)	215 lb (98 kg)	2004-10-15	Rosemount, Minnesota	USNTDP (USHL)	MIN, 21st overall 2023
11	(Canada)	Simon Tassy	Sophomore	F	6' 2" (1.88 m)	190 lb (86 kg)	2001-03-21	Montreal, Quebec	Minnesota State (CCHA)	—
12	(United States)	Mathieu De St. Phalle (A)	Senior	F	5' 9" (1.75 m)	170 lb (77 kg)	2000-03-20	Lake Forest, Illinois	Chicago Steel (USHL)	—
13	(Canada)	Christian Fitzgerald	Sophomore	F	6' 0" (1.83 m)	178 lb (81 kg)	2002-05-31	Coquitlam, British Columbia	Minnesota State (CCHA)	—
14	(United States)	Joe Palodichuk	Freshman	D	6' 0" (1.83 m)	171 lb (78 kg)	2003-02-26	Cottage Grove, Minnesota	Fargo Force (USHL)	—
15	(Canada)	David Silye	Senior	F	5' 11" (1.8 m)	184 lb (83 kg)	1999-03-02	Arnprior, Ontario	Minnesota State (CCHA)	—
16	(Canada)	Tyson Dyck	Sophomore	F	6' 0" (1.83 m)	170 lb (77 kg)	2004-02-06	Abbotsford, British Columbia	Massachusetts (HEA)	OTT, 206th overall 2022
17	(Canada)	Owen Mehlenbacher	Freshman	F	6' 2" (1.88 m)	189 lb (86 kg)	2004-01-26	Fort Erie, Ontario	Fargo Force (USHL)	DET, 201st overall 2022
18	(United States)	Owen Lindmark	Graduate	F	6' 0" (1.83 m)	195 lb (88 kg)	2001-05-17	Naperville, Illinois	USNTDP (USHL)	FLA, 137th overall 2019
19	(United States)	Quinn Finley	Freshman	F	6' 0" (1.83 m)	179 lb (81 kg)	2004-08-08	Suamico, Wisconsin	Chicago Steel (USHL)	NYI, 78th overall 2022
21	(United States)	Carson Bantle	Senior	F	6' 5" (1.96 m)	207 lb (94 kg)	2002-01-22	Onalaska, Wisconsin	Michigan Tech (WCHA)	ARI, 142nd overall 2020
22	(United States)	Jack Horbach	Sophomore	F	5' 11" (1.8 m)	176 lb (80 kg)	2002-05-04	Naperville, Illinois	Madison Capitols (USHL)	—
23	(United States)	Sawyer Scholl	Freshman	F	6' 2" (1.88 m)	190 lb (86 kg)	2002-02-14	Medford, Wisconsin	Minnesota Wilderness (NAHL)	—
24	(Canada)	Anthony Kehrer (A)	Senior	D	5' 11" (1.8 m)	210 lb (95 kg)	2002-03-04	Winnipeg, Manitoba	Sioux City Musketeers (USHL)	—
26	(United States)	Luke LaMaster	Senior	D	6' 0" (1.83 m)	197 lb (89 kg)	1999-10-17	Duluth, Minnesota	Sioux City Musketeers (USHL)	—
27	(Canada)	Tyson Jugnauth	Sophomore	D	6' 0" (1.83 m)	162 lb (73 kg)	2004-04-17	Kelowna, British Columbia	West Kelowna Warriors (BCHL)	SEA, 100th overall 2022
31	(United States)	Kyle McClellan	Senior	G	6' 1" (1.85 m)	185 lb (84 kg)	1999-03-18	Manchester, Missouri	Mercyhurst (AHA)	—
33	(United States)	Ben Garrity	Senior	G	6' 2" (1.88 m)	193 lb (88 kg)	2000-01-20	Rosemount, Minnesota	Minot Minotauros (NAHL)	—
34	(Sweden)	William Gramme	Freshman	G	6' 4" (1.93 m)	201 lb (91 kg)	2002-05-24	Stockholm, Sweden	Lone Star Brahmas (NAHL)	—
51	(United States)	Cruz Lucius	Sophomore	F	6' 0" (1.83 m)	178 lb (81 kg)	2004-04-05	Grant, Minnesota	USNTDP (USHL)	PIT, 124th overall 2022

== Standings ==
2023–24 Big Ten ice hockey Standings
	Conference record										Overall record					
	GP	W	L	T	OTW	OTL	3/SW	PTS	GF	GA	GP	W	L	T	GF	GA
#5 Michigan State †*	24	16	6	2	0	1	1	52	92	69	38	25	10	3	147	117
#11 Wisconsin	24	16	7	1	2	2	1	50	81	57	40	26	12	2	128	81
#7 Minnesota	24	13	7	4	3	1	0	41	80	65	39	23	11	5	135	100
#4 Michigan	24	11	11	2	1	1	1	36	85	77	41	23	15	3	169	125
Notre Dame	24	9	13	2	0	1	1	31	66	62	36	15	19	2	101	98
Penn State	24	7	14	3	0	1	2	27	62	92	36	15	18	3	113	130
Ohio State	24	4	18	2	1	0	2	15	50	94	38	14	20	4	100	124
Championship: March 23, 2024 † indicates conference regular season champion * indicates conference tournament champion Rankings: USCHO.com Top 20 Poll; updated April 11, 2024

== Schedule and results ==
Date	Time	Opponent^{#}	Rank^{#}	Site	TV	Decision	Result	Attendance	Record
Regular Season
October 7	7:00 pm	Augustana*		Kohl Center • Madison, Wisconsin	BTN+	McClellan	W 4–0	5,703	1–0–0
October 8	5:00 pm	Augustana*		Kohl Center • Madison, Wisconsin	BTN+	McClellan	W 3–0	6,646	2–0–0
Ice Breaker Tournament
October 13	7:00 pm	at Bemidji State*		Sanford Center • Bemidji, Minnesota (Ice Breaker Game 1)	FloHockey	McClellan	W 4–3 ^{OT}	2,008	3–0–0
October 14	6:00 pm	at #7 North Dakota*		Ralph Engelstad Arena • Grand Forks, North Dakota (Ice Breaker Game 2)	Midco	McClellan	L 0–2	11,783	3–1–0
Regular Season
October 20	6:00 pm	at #17 Michigan Tech*		MacInnes Student Ice Arena • Houghton, Michigan	FloHockey	McClellan	W 4–2	3,394	4–1–0
October 21	5:00 pm	at #17 Michigan Tech*		MacInnes Student Ice Arena • Houghton, Michigan	FloHockey	McClellan	W 5–2	3,394	5–1–0
October 26	8:00 pm	at #1 Minnesota	#14	3M Arena at Mariucci • Minneapolis, Minnesota (Rivalry)	BTN	McClellan	W 5–2	8,461	6–1–0 (1–0–0)
October 27	8:00 pm	at #1 Minnesota	#14	3M Arena at Mariucci • Minneapolis, Minnesota (Rivalry)	BTN	McClellan	W 3–2	10,363	7–1–0 (2–0–0)
November 3	7:00 pm	#4 Michigan	#5	Kohl Center • Madison, Wisconsin	BTN+	McClellan	W 5–4	10,114	8–1–0 (3–0–0)
November 4	6:00 pm	#4 Michigan	#5	Kohl Center • Madison, Wisconsin	BTN+	McClellan	W 2–1	12,218	9–1–0 (4–0–0)
November 17	6:30 pm	at #11 Michigan State	#1	Munn Ice Arena • East Lansing, Michigan	BTN+	McClellan	L 2–4	6,555	9–2–0 (4–1–0)
November 18	5:00 pm	at #11 Michigan State	#1	Munn Ice Arena • East Lansing, Michigan	BTN+	McClellan	L 2–3	6,555	9–3–0 (4–2–0)
November 24	7:00 pm	Alaska Anchorage*	#6	Kohl Center • Madison, Wisconsin	BTN+	McClellan	L 0–1	8,496	9–4–0
November 25	6:00 pm	Alaska Anchorage*	#6	Kohl Center • Madison, Wisconsin	BTN+	Gramme	W 5–0	8,755	10–4–0
December 1	7:00 pm	Ohio State	#6	Kohl Center • Madison, Wisconsin	BTN+	McClellan	W 3–0	9,859	11–4–0 (5–2–0)
December 2	8:00 pm	Ohio State	#6	Kohl Center • Madison, Wisconsin	BTN+	McClellan	W 6–1	9,720	12–4–0 (6–2–0)
December 8	8:00 pm	#17 Penn State	#6	Kohl Center • Madison, Wisconsin	BTN	McClellan	W 6–3	7,470	13–4–0 (7–2–0)
December 9	7:00 pm	#17 Penn State	#6	Kohl Center • Madison, Wisconsin	BTN+	Gramme	W 4–1	9,490	14–4–0 (8–2–0)
Holiday Face–Off
December 28	7:30 pm	vs. Air Force*	#6	Fiserv Forum • Milwaukee, Wisconsin (Holiday Face–Off Semifinal)	BSW	McClellan	W 3–0	8,652	15–4–0
December 29	7:30 pm	vs. Northeastern*	#6	Fiserv Forum • Milwaukee, Wisconsin (Holiday Face–Off Championship)	BSW	McClellan	W 3–0	8,689	16–4–0
Regular Season
January 5	6:00 pm	at Notre Dame	#5	Compton Family Ice Arena • Notre Dame, Indiana	Peacock	McClellan	W 2–1	5,069	17–4–0 (9–2–0)
January 6	4:00 pm	at Notre Dame	#5	Compton Family Ice Arena • Notre Dame, Indiana	Peacock	McClellan	W 7–4	5,077	18–4–0 (10–2–0)
January 12	7:00 pm	Lindenwood*	#3	Kohl Center • Madison, Wisconsin	BTN+	McClellan	W 5–0	7,775	19–4–0
January 13	7:00 pm	Lindenwood*	#3	Kohl Center • Madison, Wisconsin	BTN+	Gramme	T 3–3 ^{OT}	9,379	19–4–1
January 26	6:00 pm	at #14 Michigan	#3	Yost Ice Arena • Ann Arbor, Michigan	BTN+	McClellan	L 1–5	5,800	19–5–1 (10–3–0)
January 27	6:00 pm	at #14 Michigan	#3	Yost Ice Arena • Ann Arbor, Michigan	BTN+	McClellan	W 6–5 ^{OT}	5,800	20–5–1 (11–3–0)
February 2	7:00 pm	#9 Minnesota	#4	Kohl Center • Madison, Wisconsin (Rivalry)	BTN+	McClellan	L 1–2 ^{OT}	13,498	20–6–1 (11–4–0)
February 3	7:00 pm	#9 Minnesota	#4	Kohl Center • Madison, Wisconsin (Rivalry)	BTN+	McClellan	T 1–1 ^{SOW}	15,359	20–6–2 (11–4–1)
February 9	7:00 pm	Notre Dame	#4	Kohl Center • Madison, Wisconsin	BTN+	McClellan	W 4–2	9,789	21–6–2 (12–4–1)
February 10	6:00 pm	Notre Dame	#4	Kohl Center • Madison, Wisconsin	BTN+	McClellan	W 3–2	12,672	22–6–2 (13–4–1)
February 16	6:00 pm	at Ohio State	#4	Value City Arena • Columbus, Ohio	BTN+	McClellan	L 2–3 ^{OT}	6,353	22–7–2 (13–5–1)
February 17	3:30 pm	at Ohio State	#4	Value City Arena • Columbus, Ohio	BTN	McClellan	L 1–3	6,764	22–8–2 (13–6–1)
February 23	6:00 pm	at Penn State	#6	Pegula Ice Arena • University Park, Pennsylvania	BTN+	McClellan	W 6–0	6,403	23–8–2 (14–6–1)
February 24	4:00 pm	at Penn State	#6	Pegula Ice Arena • University Park, Pennsylvania	BTN+	McClellan	W 3–2 ^{OT}	6,569	24–8–2 (15–6–1)
March 1	8:00 pm	#6 Michigan State	#4	Kohl Center • Madison, Wisconsin	BTN+	McClellan	L 2–5	13,208	24–9–2 (15–7–1)
March 2	8:00 pm	#6 Michigan State	#4	Kohl Center • Madison, Wisconsin	BTN+	McClellan	W 4–1	13,428	25–9–2 (16–7–1)
Big Ten Tournament
March 8	7:00 pm	Ohio State*	#5	Kohl Center • Madison, Wisconsin (Quarterfinal Game 1)	BTN+	McClellan	L 1–3	8,873	25–10–2
March 9	6:00 pm	Ohio State*	#5	Kohl Center • Madison, Wisconsin (Quarterfinal Game 2)	BTN+	McClellan	W 4–2	10,837	26–10–2
March 10	5:00 pm	Ohio State*	#5	Kohl Center • Madison, Wisconsin (Quarterfinal Game 3)	BTN+	McClellan	L 1–3	7,944	26–11–2
NCAA Tournament
March 29	4:30 PM	vs. #8 Quinnipiac*	#9	Amica Mutual Pavilion • Providence, Rhode Island (NCAA East Regional semifinal)	ESPNews	McClellan	L 2–3 ^{OT}	6,988	26–12–2
*Non-conference game. ^{#}Rankings from USCHO.com Poll. All times are in Central Time. Source:

== Scoring statistics ==
Name	Position	Games	Goals	Assists	Points	PIM
Cruz Lucius	RW	36	13	21	34	10
David Silye	C	40	9	23	32	10
Simon Tassy	F	40	12	16	28	47
Ben Dexheimer	D	40	5	23	28	16
Mathieu De St. Phalle	F	38	11	16	27	8
Christian Fitzgerald	F	37	7	17	24	16
Owen Lindmark	C	28	11	10	21	6
Carson Bantle	LW	39	14	5	19	45
Joe Palodichuk	D	40	3	15	18	25
William Whitelaw	C	37	10	7	17	17
Quinn Finley	RW	36	10	6	16	16
Jack Horbach	C/RW	38	6	8	14	26
Daniel Laatsch	D	40	2	9	11	6
Anthony Kehrer	D	38	2	7	9	23
Tyson Dyck	C	28	0	9	9	21
Sawyer Scholl	RW	33	6	2	8	20
Charlie Stramel	C/RW	34	3	5	8	20
Zach Schulz	D	34	2	4	6	6
Mike Vorlicky	D	37	1	4	5	27
Owen Mehlenbacher	C	26	1	3	4	8
Tyson Jugnauth	D	13	0	2	2	8
Luke LaMaster	D	1	0	0	0	0
William Gramme	G	4	0	0	0	0
Sam Stange	RW	7	0	0	0	4
Brady Cleveland	D	16	0	0	0	19
Kyle McClellan	G	37	0	0	0	0
Total			128	212	340	412

== Goaltending statistics ==
Name	Games	Minutes	Wins	Losses	Ties	Goals against	Saves	Shut outs	SV %	GAA
William Gramme	4	213:07	2	0	1	4	94	1	.959	1.13
Kyle McClellan	37	2198:20	24	12	1	71	953	7	.931	1.94
Empty Net	-	22:58	-	-	-	6	-	-	-	-
Total	40	2434:25	26	12	2	81	1047	8	.928	2.00

== Rankings ==
Poll	Week																										
Poll	Pre	1	2	3	4	5	6	7	8	9	10	11	12	13	14	15	16	17	18	19	20	21	22	23	24	25	26 (Final)
USCHO.com	NR	NR	NR	14	5 (5)	3 (12)	1 (32)	6	6	6	6 (1)	–	5 (1)	3 (5)	4 (1)	3 (1)	4	4	4 (1)	6	4	5	9	9	9	–	11
USA Hockey	NR	NR	NR	18	5 (1)	3 (3)	1 (28)	6	8	6	6	6	–	3 (3)	4 (1)	3 (2)	4	4	4	6	5	6	9	9	9	11	10

Note: USCHO did not release a poll in weeks 11 and 25.
Note: USA Hockey did not release a poll in week 12.

== Awards and honors ==
Player	Award	Ref
Kyle McClellan	Mike Richter Award	
Kyle McClellan	AHCA West Second Team All-American	
Kyle McClellan	Big Ten Goaltender of the Year	
Kyle McClellan	Big Ten First Team	

== 2024 NHL entry draft ==
Round	Pick	Player	NHL team
4	108	Luke Osburn ^{†}	Buffalo Sabres
4	117	Blake Montgomery ^{†}	Ottawa Senators

† incoming freshman
