= Landon Slaggert =

American ice hockey player (born 2002)

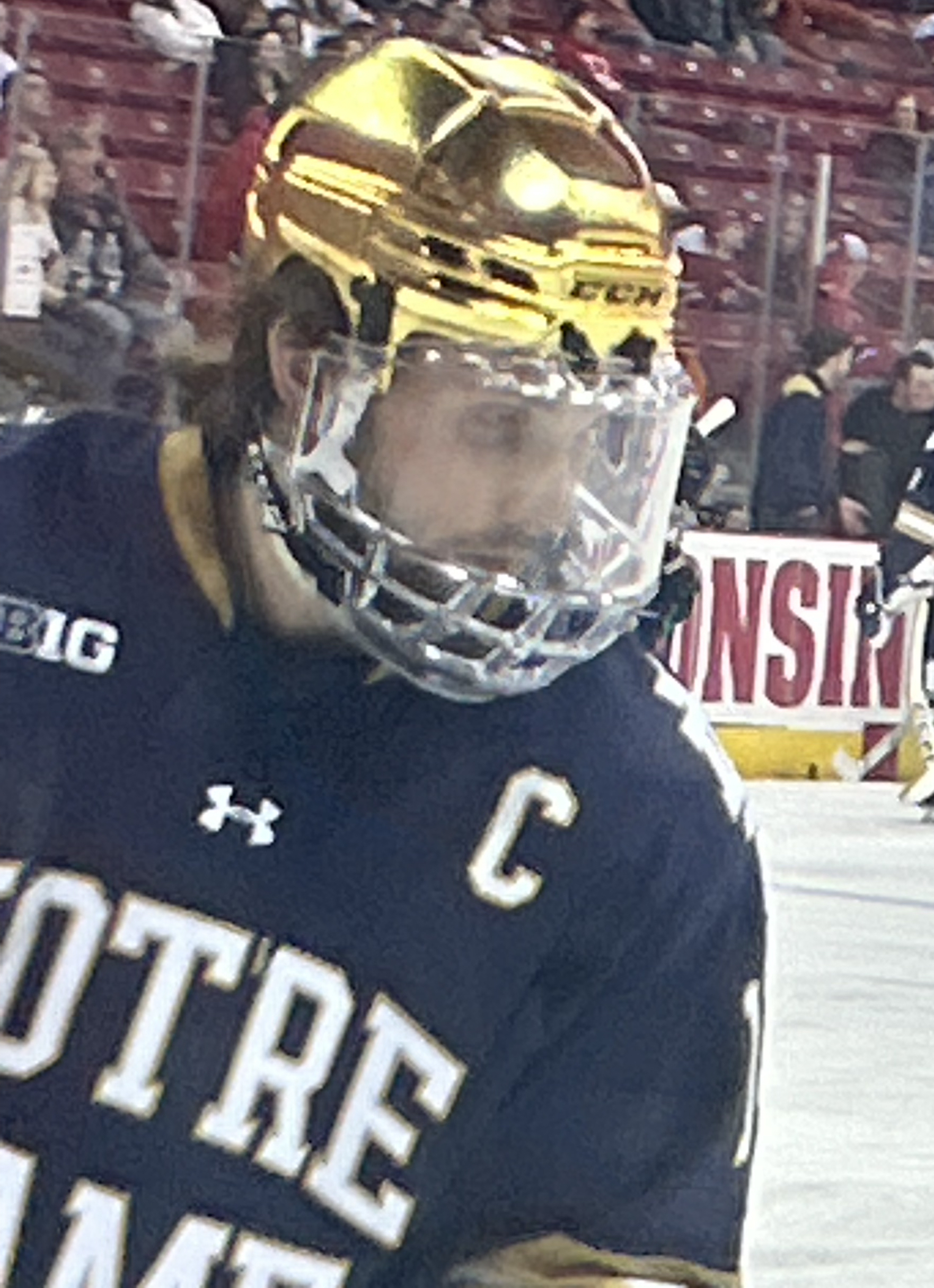
- Slaggert playing for Notre Dame in 2024
- Born: June 25, 2002 (age 24) South Bend, Indiana, U.S.
- Height: 6 ft 0 in (183 cm)
- Weight: 180 lb (82 kg; 12 st 12 lb)
- Position: Left wing
- Shoots: Left
- NHL team (P) Cur. team: Chicago Blackhawks; Rockford IceHogs (AHL)
- NHL draft: 79th overall, 2020; Chicago Blackhawks
- Playing career: 2024–present

Landon Slaggert (born June 21, 2002) is an American ice hockey left winger for the Rockford IceHogs of the American Hockey League (AHL) while under contract to the Chicago Blackhawks of the National Hockey League (NHL). He was drafted 79th overall by the Blackhawks in the 2020 NHL entry draft. He played college hockey at the University of Notre Dame.

== Playing career ==
=== College ===
Slaggert played with the Chicago Mission from 2015 to 2019. He joined the Notre Dame Fighting Irish men's ice hockey team in 2020. He played in 25 games as a freshman, where he tallied 8 goals and 14 assists. Slaggert was named Notre Dame's Rooke of the Year in 2021. Following a disappointing junior-year campaign where he only put-up 13 points, Slaggert rebounded with a collegiate career high of 31 points during his senior year. He concluded his collegiate career with 47 goals and 45 assists, in 136 games for Notre Dame. He was also the captain of the Fighting Irish during his senior year.

=== Professional ===
On March 10, 2024, Slaggert signed a two-year, entry-level contract with the Chicago Blackhawks. Slaggert made his NHL debut on March 15 against the Los Angeles Kings. He recorded the first two points of his NHL career, a pair of assists, against the Calgary Flames on March 27. Slaggert scored his first NHL goal on April 11 against the St. Louis Blues. Slaggert appeared in 53 games for the Blackhawks during the 2025–26 season where he recorded three goals and four assists. The Blackhawks waived him on September 27, 2026. He cleared waivers and joined Chicago's AHL affiliate, the Rockford IceHogs.

== International play ==
Medal record

Ice hockey

Representing United States

World Junior Championships
Gold medal – first place	2021 Canada	

Slaggert also played for the USA Hockey National Team Development Program (USNTDP) between 2018 and 2020, before playing for Team USA at the 2021 and 2022 International Ice Hockey Federation World Junior Championship. He won a gold medal with the US in 2021.

== Personal life ==
Slaggert is a native of South Bend, Indiana. His brothers, Graham and Carter, also played for the Notre Dame Fighting Irish men's ice hockey team. His father, Andy, is the director of North American recruiting for the Edmonton Oilers. Slaggert grew up as a Detroit Red Wings fan as a child.

== Career statistics ==
=== Regular season and playoffs ===
			Regular season					Playoffs
Season	Team	League	GP	G	A	Pts	PIM	GP	G	A	Pts	PIM
2016–17	Chicago Mission U14	HPHL	20	6	10	10	10	—	—	—	—	—
2017–18	Chicago Mission U16	HPHL	20	8	12	20	0	—	—	—	—	—
2018–19	U.S. National Development Team	USHL	30	6	8	14	16	—	—	—	—	—
2019–20	U.S. National Development Team	USHL	19	6	4	10	14	—	—	—	—	—
2020–21	University of Notre Dame	B1G	25	8	14	22	10	—	—	—	—	—
2021–22	University of Notre Dame	B1G	40	12	14	26	39	—	—	—	—	—
2022–23	University of Notre Dame	B1G	35	7	6	13	14	—	—	—	—	—
2023–24	University of Notre Dame	B1G	36	20	11	31	10	—	—	—	—	—
2023–24	Chicago Blackhawks	NHL	16	1	3	4	4	—	—	—	—	—
2024–25	Rockford IceHogs	AHL	39	10	15	25	14	—	—	—	—	—
2024–25	Chicago Blackhawks	NHL	33	2	4	6	23	—	—	—	—	—
2025–26	Chicago Blackhawks	NHL	53	3	4	7	16	—	—	—	—	—
2025–26	Rockford IceHogs	AHL	8	2	2	4	8	—	—	—	—	—
NHL totals			102	6	11	17	43	—	—	—	—	—

=== International ===
Year	Team	Event	Result	GP	G	A	Pts	PIM
2018	United States	U17	8th	5	2	1	3	14
2021	United States	WJC	1st place, gold medalist(s)	7	0	0	0	12
2022	United States	WJC	5th	5	2	4	6	0
Junior totals				17	4	5	9	26

== Awards and honors ==
Award	Year
College
All-Big Ten Second Team	2024
