= List of current NHL Western Conference team rosters =

This is a list of current National Hockey League (NHL) Western Conference team rosters:

== Pacific Division ==
=== Anaheim Ducks ===
Updated November 17, 2025

No.	Nat	Player	Pos	S/G	Age	Acquired	Birthplace
91	(Sweden)	Leo Carlsson (A)	C	L	20	2023	Karlstad, Sweden
1	(Czech Republic)	Lukas Dostal	G	L	25	2018	Brno, Czech Republic
61	(United States)	Cutter Gauthier	LW	L	21	2024	Skellefteå, Sweden
64	(Finland)	Mikael Granlund	C	L	33	2025	Oulu, Finland
7	(Czech Republic)	Radko Gudas (C)	D	R	35	2023	Prague, Czechoslovakia
24	(Canada)	Jansen Harkins	C	L	28	2024	Cleveland, Ohio
14	(United States)	Drew Helleson	D	R	24	2022	Farmington, Minnesota
44	(Canada)	Ross Johnston	LW	L	31	2023	Charlottetown, Prince Edward Island
17	(Canada)	Alex Killorn (A)	LW	L	36	2023	Halifax, Nova Scotia
20	(United States)	Chris Kreider	LW	L	34	2025	Boxford, Massachusetts
2	(United States)	Jackson LaCombe (A)	D	L	24	2019	Eden Prairie, Minnesota
23	(Canada)	Mason McTavish (A)	C	L	22	2021	Zürich, Switzerland
98	(Russia)	Pavel Mintyukov	D	L	22	2022	Moscow, Russia
74	(United States)	Ian Moore	D	R	23	2020	Concord, Massachusetts
34	(Czech Republic)	Petr Mrazek	G	L	33	2025	Ostrava, Czechoslovakia
13	(United States)	Nikita Nesterenko	C	L	24	2023	Brooklyn, New York
25	(United States)	Ryan Poehling	C	L	26	2025	Lakeville, Minnesota
45	(Canada)	Beckett Sennecke	RW	R	19	2024	Toronto, Ontario
16	(Canada)	Ryan Strome (A)	C	R	32	2022	Mississauga, Ontario
19	(United States)	Troy Terry	RW	R	28	2015	Denver, Colorado
65	(United States)	Jacob Trouba	D	R	31	2024	Rochester, Michigan
77	(United States)	Frank Vatrano	RW	L	31	2022	East Longmeadow, Massachusetts
51	(Canada)	Olen Zellweger	D	L	22	2021	Calgary, Alberta

=== Calgary Flames ===
Updated November 19, 2025

No.	Nat	Player	Pos	S/G	Age	Acquired	Birthplace
4	(Sweden)	Rasmus Andersson (A)	D	R	29	2015	Malmo, Sweden
11	(Sweden)	Mikael Backlund (C)	C	L	36	2007	Vasteras, Sweden
7	(Canada)	Kevin Bahl	D	L	25	2024	New Westminster, British Columbia
24	(Canada)	Jake Bean	D	L	27	2024	Calgary, Alberta
18	(United States)	John Beecher	C	L	24	2025	Elmira, New York
20	(United States)	Blake Coleman (A)	C	L	33	2021	Plano, Texas
1	(United States)	Devin Cooley	G	L	28	2024	Los Gatos, California
27	(United States)	Matt Coronato	RW	R	23	2021	Huntington, New York
86	(United States)	Joel Farabee	LW	L	25	2025	Cicero, New York
16	(Canada)	Morgan Frost	C	L	26	2025	Aurora, Ontario
44	(Canada)	Joel Hanley	D	L	34	2024	Keswick, Ontario
29	(Slovakia)	Samuel Honzek	LW	L	21	2023	Trencin, Slovakia
10	(Canada)	Jonathan Huberdeau (A)	LW	L	32	2022	Saint-Jerome, Quebec
15	(Canada)	Dryden Hunt	LW	L	30	2023	Cranbrook, British Columbia
91	(Canada)	Nazem Kadri (A)	C	L	35	2022	London, Ontario
43	(Czech Republic)	Adam Klapka	RW	R	25	2022	Prague, Czech Republic
37	(Russia)	Yan Kuznetsov	D	L	23	2020	Murmansk, Russia
70	(Canada)	Ryan Lomberg	LW	L	31	2024	Richmond Hill, Ontario
45	(United States)	Sam Morton	LW	L	26	2024	Lafayette, Colorado
94	(Canada)	Brayden Pachal	D	R	26	2024	Estevan, Saskatchewan
19	(Canada)	Zayne Parekh	D	R	19	2024	Nobleton, Ontario
76	(Slovakia)	Martin Pospisil	C	L	26	2018	Zvolen, Slovakia
17	(Belarus)	Yegor Sharangovich	C/LW	L	27	2023	Minsk, Belarus
52	(Canada)	MacKenzie Weegar (A)	D	R	31	2022	Nepean, Ontario
32	(United States)	Dustin Wolf	G	L	24	2019	Gilroy, California
47	(Canada)	Connor Zary	C	L	24	2020	Saskatoon, Saskatchewan

=== Edmonton Oilers ===
Updated November 21, 2025

No.	Nat	Player	Pos	S/G	Age	Acquired	Birthplace
2	(Canada)	Evan Bouchard	D	R	26	2018	Oakville, Ontario
64	(Canada)	Connor Clattenburg	C	L	20	2024	Ottawa, Ontario
29	(Germany)	Leon Draisaitl (A)	C	L	30	2014	Cologne, Germany
14	(Sweden)	Mattias Ekholm	D	L	35	2023	Borlange, Sweden
49	(United States)	Ty Emberson	D	R	25	2024	Eau Claire, Wisconsin
10	(United States)	Trent Frederic	C	L	27	2025	St. Louis, Missouri
19	(Canada)	Adam Henrique	C	L	35	2024	Brantford, Ontario
18	(Canada)	Zach Hyman	LW	R	33	2021	Toronto, Ontario
13	(Sweden)	Mattias Janmark	LW	L	32	2022	Danderyd, Sweden
42	(Finland)	Kasperi Kapanen	RW	R	29	2024	Kuopio, Finland
27	(Canada)	Brett Kulak	D	L	31	2022	Stony Plain, Alberta
20	(Canada)	Curtis Lazar	C	R	30	2025	Salmon Arm, British Columbia
88	(Canada)	Andrew Mangiapane	LW	L	29	2025	Toronto, Ontario
97	(Canada)	Connor McDavid (C)	C	L	28	2015	Richmond Hill, Ontario
93	(Canada)	Ryan Nugent-Hopkins (A)	C	L	32	2011	Burnaby, British Columbia
25	(Canada)	Darnell Nurse (A)	D	L	30	2013	Hamilton, Ontario
48	(Canada)	Noah Philp	C	R	27	2024	Canmore, Alberta
30	(Canada)	Calvin Pickard	G	L	33	2022	Moncton, New Brunswick
92	(Russia)	Vasily Podkolzin	RW	L	24	2024	Moscow, Russia
75	(United States)	Alec Regula	D	R	25	2024	West Bloomfield, Michigan
28	(United States)	Jack Roslovic	C	R	28	2025	Columbus, Ohio
22	(Canada)	Matt Savoie	C	R	21	2024	St. Albert, Alberta
74	(Canada)	Stuart Skinner	G	L	27	2017	Edmonton, Alberta
86	(Czech Republic)	David Tomasek	RW	R	29	2025	Prague, Czech Republic
96	(Canada)	Jake Walman	D	L	29	2025	Toronto, Ontario

=== Los Angeles Kings ===
Updated November 21, 2025

No.	Nat	Player	Pos	S/G	Age	Acquired	Birthplace
44	(United States)	Mikey Anderson	D	L	26	2017	Fridley, Minnesota
40	(Finland)	Joel Armia	RW	R	32	2025	Pori, Finland
55	(Canada)	Quinton Byfield	C	L	23	2020	Newmarket, Ontario
5	(Canada)	Cody Ceci	D	R	31	2025	Ottawa, Ontario
92	(Canada)	Brandt Clarke	D	R	22	2021	Nepean, Ontario
24	(Canada)	Phillip Danault (A)	C	L	32	2021	Victoriaville, Quebec
8	(Canada)	Drew Doughty (A)	D	R	35	2008	London, Ontario
2	(United States)	Brian Dumoulin	D	L	34	2025	Biddeford, Maine
6	(Canada)	Joel Edmundson	D	L	32	2023	Brandon, Manitoba
22	(Switzerland)	Kevin Fiala	RW	L	29	2022	St. Gallen, Switzerland
37	(Canada)	Warren Foegele	LW	L	29	2024	Markham, Ontario
31	(Sweden)	Anton Forsberg	G	L	32	2025	Härnösand, Sweden
79	(Finland)	Samuel Helenius	C	L	23	2021	Dallas, Texas
9	(Sweden)	Adrian Kempe	LW	L	29	2014	Kramfors, Sweden
11	(Slovenia)	Anze Kopitar (C)	C	L	38	2005	Jesenice, Yugoslavia
35	(Canada)	Darcy Kuemper	G	L	35	2024	Saskatoon, Saskatchewan
96	(Russia)	Andrei Kuzmenko	LW	R	29	2025	Yakutsk, Russia
14	(United States)	Alex Laferriere	RW	R	24	2020	Chatham, New Jersey
39	(Canada)	Jeff Malott	LW	L	29	2024	Burlington, Ontario
12	(United States)	Trevor Moore	LW	L	30	2020	Thousand Oaks, California
43	(Sweden)	Jacob Moverare	D	L	27	2016	Östersund, Sweden
10	(Canada)	Corey Perry	RW	R	40	2025	Peterborough, Ontario
15	(United States)	Alex Turcotte	C	L	24	2019	Elk Grove, Illinois

=== San Jose Sharks ===
Updated November 15, 2025

No.	Nat	Player	Pos	S/G	Age	Acquired	Birthplace
30	(Russia)	Yaroslav Askarov	G	R	23	2024	Omsk, Russia
71	(Canada)	Macklin Celebrini (A)	C	L	19	2024	North Vancouver, British Columbia
10	(Canada)	Ty Dellandrea	C	R	25	2024	Port Perry, Ontario
5	(Canada)	Vincent Desharnais	D	R	29	2025	Laval, Quebec
6	(Canada)	Sam Dickinson	D	L	19	2024	Toronto, Ontario
72	(Sweden)	William Eklund	LW	L	23	2021	Haninge, Sweden
38	(Canada)	Mario Ferraro (A)	D	L	27	2017	King City, Ontario
81	(United States)	Adam Gaudette	RW	R	29	2025	Braintree, Massachusetts
23	(Canada)	Barclay Goodrow (A)	RW	L	32	2024	Toronto, Ontario
51	(United States)	Collin Graf	RW	R	23	2024	Lincoln, Massachusetts
22	(Canada)	Vincent Iorio	D	R	23	2025	Coquitlam, British Columbia
3	(Sweden)	John Klingberg	D	R	33	2025	Gothenburg, Sweden
96	(Switzerland)	Philipp Kurashev	C	L	26	2025	Münsingen, Switzerland
4	(United States)	Nick Leddy	D	L	34	2025	Eden Prairie, Minnesota
37	(Sweden)	Timothy Liljegren	D	R	26	2024	Kristianstad, Sweden
77	(Canada)	Michael Misa	C	L	18	2025	Oakville, Ontario
85	(Russia)	Shakir Mukhamadullin	D	L	23	2023	Ufa, Russia
33	(United States)	Alex Nedeljkovic	G	L	29	2025	Parma, Ohio
9	(Russia)	Dmitry Orlov	D	L	34	2025	Novokuznetsk, Russia
63	(Canada)	Zack Ostapchuk	C	L	22	2025	Edmonton, Alberta
75	(Canada)	Ryan Reaves	RW	R	38	2025	Winnipeg, Manitoba
53	(Canada)	Jeff Skinner	LW	L	33	2025	Markham, Ontario
2	(United States)	Will Smith	C	R	20	2023	Lexington, Massachusetts
73	(Canada)	Tyler Toffoli (A)	RW	R	33	2024	Scarborough, Ontario
21	(Sweden)	Alexander Wennberg (A)	C	L	31	2024	Nacka, Sweden

=== Seattle Kraken ===
Updated October 22, 2025

No.	Nat	Player	Pos	S/G	Age	Acquired	Birthplace
10	(United States)	Matty Beniers (A)	C	L	23	2021	Hingham, Massachusetts
77	(Canada)	Berkly Catton	C	L	19	2024	Saskatoon, Saskatchewan
35	(United States)	Joey Daccord	G	L	29	2021	Boston, Massachusetts
29	(Canada)	Vince Dunn	D	L	29	2021	Mississauga, Ontario
7	(Canada)	Jordan Eberle (C)	RW	R	35	2021	Regina, Saskatchewan
41	(Canada)	Ryker Evans	D	L	23	2021	Calgary, Alberta
8	(Canada)	Cale Fleury	D	R	27	2021	Carlyle, Saskatchewan
89	(Canada)	Frederick Gaudreau	C	R	32	2025	Bromont, Quebec
31	(Germany)	Philipp Grubauer	G	L	34	2021	Rosenheim, Germany
15	(United States)	John Hayden	C	R	30	2022	Chicago, Illinois
84	(Finland)	Kaapo Kakko	RW	L	24	2024	Turku, Finland
12	(Canada)	Tye Kartye	LW	L	24	2022	Kingston, Ontario
6	(Sweden)	Adam Larsson (A)	D	R	33	2021	Skellefteå, Sweden
55	(United States)	Ryan Lindgren	D	L	27	2025	Minneapolis, Minnesota
28	(Canada)	Josh Mahura	D	L	27	2024	St. Albert, Alberta
27	(Canada)	Mason Marchment	LW	L	30	2025	Uxbridge, Ontario
19	(Canada)	Jared McCann	C	L	29	2021	Stratford, Ontario
59	(United States)	Ben Meyers	C	L	27	2024	Delano, Minnesota
62	(Canada)	Brandon Montour	D	R	31	2024	Ohsweken, Ontario
30	(Canada)	Matt Murray	G	L	31	2025	Thunder Bay, Ontario
38	(Finland)	Jani Nyman	RW	L	21	2022	Valkeakoski, Finland
24	(Canada)	Jamie Oleksiak	D	L	32	2021	Toronto, Ontario
17	(Canada)	Jaden Schwartz (A)	LW	L	33	2021	Melfort, Saskatchewan
9	(Canada)	Chandler Stephenson	C	L	31	2024	Saskatoon, Saskatchewan
20	(Finland)	Eeli Tolvanen	RW	L	26	2022	Vihti, Finland
26	(Canada)	Ryan Winterton	C	R	22	2021	Markham, Ontario
51	(Canada)	Shane Wright	C	R	21	2022	Burlington, Ontario

=== Vancouver Canucks ===
Updated November 25, 2025

No.	Nat	Player	Pos	S/G	Age	Acquired	Birthplace
13	(Canada)	Arshdeep Bains	LW	L	24	2022	Surrey, British Columbia
53	(Latvia)	Teddy Blueger	C	L	31	2023	Riga, Latvia
6	(United States)	Brock Boeser (A)	RW	R	28	2015	Burnsville, Minnesota
72	(Czech Republic)	Filip Chytil	C	L	26	2025	Kroměříž, Czech Republic
74	(Canada)	Jake DeBrusk	RW	L	29	2024	Edmonton, Alberta
35	(United States)	Thatcher Demko	G	L	29	2014	San Diego, California
27	(United States)	Derek Forbort	D	L	33	2024	Duluth, Minnesota
8	(United States)	Conor Garland	RW	R	29	2021	Scituate, Massachusetts
21	(Sweden)	Nils Hoglander	LW	L	24	2019	Bocktrask, Sweden
17	(Czech Republic)	Filip Hronek	D	R	28	2023	Hradec Králové, Czech Republic
43	(United States)	Quinn Hughes (C)	D	L	26	2018	Orlando, Florida
7	(Canada)	Pierre-Olivier Joseph	D	L	26	2025	Laval, Quebec
64	(Czech Republic)	David Kampf	C	L	30	2025	Jirkov, Czech Republic
91	(Canada)	Evander Kane	LW	L	34	2025	Vancouver, British Columbia
94	(Sweden)	Linus Karlsson	C	R	26	2019	Eksjö, Sweden
32	(Finland)	Kevin Lankinen	G	L	30	2024	Helsinki, Finland
57	(Canada)	Tyler Myers (A)	D	R	35	2019	Houston, Texas
18	(United States)	Drew O'Connor	LW	L	27	2025	Chatham, New Jersey
30	(Czech Republic)	Jiri Patera	G	L	26	2024	Prague, Czech Republic
25	(Sweden)	Elias Pettersson	D	L	21	2022	Västerås, Sweden
40	(Sweden)	Elias Pettersson (A)	C	L	27	2017	Sundsvall, Sweden
29	(Sweden)	Marcus Pettersson	D	L	29	2025	Skellefteå, Sweden
54	(Finland)	Aatu Raty	C	L	23	2023	Oulunsalo, Finland
73	(Germany)	Lukas Reichel	LW	L	23	2025	Nuremberg, Germany
63	(United States)	Max Sasson	C	L	25	2023	Birmingham, Michigan
44	(United States)	Kiefer Sherwood	RW	R	30	2024	Columbus, Ohio
60	(Belarus)	Nikita Tolopilo	G	L	25	2023	Minsk, Belarus
5	(Sweden)	Tom Willander	D	R	20	2023	Stockholm, Sweden

=== Vegas Golden Knights ===
Updated November 19, 2025

No.	Nat	Player	Pos	S/G	Age	Acquired	Birthplace
49	(Russia)	Ivan Barbashev	C	L	29	2023	Moscow, Russia
42	(Canada)	Braeden Bowman	RW	R	22	2025	Kitchener, Ontario
16	(Russia)	Pavel Dorofeyev	C	L	25	2019	Nizhny Tagil, Russia
9	(United States)	Jack Eichel (A)	C	R	29	2021	North Chelmsford, Massachusetts
15	(United States)	Noah Hanifin	D	L	28	2024	Boston, Massachusetts
48	(Czech Republic)	Tomas Hertl	C	L	32	2024	Prague, Czech Republic
33	(Canada)	Adin Hill	G	L	29	2022	Comox, British Columbia
26	(Sweden)	Alexander Holtz	F	L	23	2024	Saltsjö-Boo, Sweden
21	(Canada)	Brett Howden	C	L	27	2021	Oakbank, Manitoba
17	(Canada)	Ben Hutton	D	L	32	2021	Brockville, Ontario
71	(Sweden)	William Karlsson (A)	C	L	31	2017	Märsta, Sweden
55	(Canada)	Keegan Kolesar	RW	R	28	2017	Brandon, Manitoba
6	(Canada)	Kaedan Korczak	D	R	24	2019	Yorkton, Saskatchewan
5	(Canada)	Jeremy Lauzon	D	L	28	2025	Val-d'Or, Quebec
30	(Sweden)	Carl Lindbom	G	L	22	2021	Stockholm, Sweden
93	(Canada)	Mitch Marner	RW	R	28	2025	Markham, Ontario
3	(Canada)	Brayden McNabb	D	L	34	2017	Davidson, Saskatchewan
7	(Canada)	Alex Pietrangelo (A)	D	R	35	2020	King City, Ontario
23	(Canada)	Cole Reinhardt	LW	L	25	2025	Calgary, Alberta
20	(United States)	Brandon Saad	LW	L	33	2025	Pittsburgh, Pennsylvania
40	(Switzerland)	Akira Schmid	G	L	25	2024	Bern, Switzerland
10	(Canada)	Colton Sissons	C	R	32	2025	North Vancouver, British Columbia
19	(Canada)	Reilly Smith	RW	L	34	2025	Etobicoke, Ontario
61	(Canada)	Mark Stone (C)	RW	R	33	2019	Winnipeg, Manitoba
27	(Canada)	Shea Theodore	D	L	30	2017	Langley, British Columbia
2	(Canada)	Zach Whitecloud	D	R	28	2018	Brandon, Manitoba

== Central Division ==
=== Chicago Blackhawks ===
Updated November 23, 2025

No.	Nat	Player	Pos	S/G	Age	Acquired	Birthplace
98	(Canada)	Connor Bedard	C	R	20	2023	North Vancouver, British Columbia
59	(Canada)	Tyler Bertuzzi	LW	L	30	2024	Sudbury, Ontario
39	(Canada)	Laurent Brossoit	G	L	32	2024	Port Alberni, British Columbia
28	(Sweden)	Andre Burakovsky	LW	L	30	2025	Klagenfurt, Austria
46	(Canada)	Louis Crevier	D	R	24	2020	Quebec City, Quebec
34	(Canada)	Colton Dach	C	L	22	2021	Fort Saskatchewan, Alberta
16	(Canada)	Jason Dickinson (A)	C	L	30	2022	Georgetown, Ontario
8	(United States)	Ryan Donato	C	L	29	2023	Scituate, Massachusetts
17	(United States)	Nick Foligno (C)	LW	L	38	2023	Buffalo, New York
20	(Canada)	Ryan Greene	C	R	22	2022	St. John's, Newfoundland and Labrador
48	(United States)	Matt Grzelcyk	D	L	31	2025	Boston, Massachusetts
44	(United States)	Wyatt Kaiser	D	L	23	2020	Andover, Minnesota
30	(United States)	Spencer Knight	G	L	24	2025	Darien, Connecticut
24	(United States)	Sam Lafferty	C	R	30	2025	Hollidaysburg, Pennsylvania
55	(Belarus)	Artyom Levshunov	D	R	20	2024	Zhlobin, Belarus
95	(Russia)	Ilya Mikheyev	RW	L	31	2024	Omsk, Russia
11	(United States)	Oliver Moore	C	L	20	2023	Mounds View, Minnesota
5	(United States)	Connor Murphy (A)	D	R	32	2017	Boston, Massachusetts
91	(United States)	Frank Nazar	C	R	21	2022	Mount Clemens, Michigan
6	(United States)	Sam Rinzel	D	R	21	2022	Chanhassen, Minnesota
84	(United States)	Landon Slaggert	LW	L	23	2020	South Bend, Indiana
40	(Sweden)	Arvid Soderblom	G	L	26	2021	Gothenburg, Sweden
86	(Finland)	Teuvo Teravainen	C	L	31	2024	Helsinki, Finland
72	(United States)	Alex Vlasic	D	L	24	2019	Wilmette, Illinois

=== Colorado Avalanche ===
Updated November 24, 2025

No.	Nat	Player	Pos	S/G	Age	Acquired	Birthplace
93	(Russia)	Zakhar Bardakov	C	L	24	2024	Seversk, Russia
39	(Canada)	Mackenzie Blackwood	G	L	28	2024	Thunder Bay, Ontario
54	(United States)	Gavin Brindley	RW	R	21	2025	Estero, Florida
84	(Canada)	Brent Burns	D	R	40	2025	Barrie, Ontario
20	(United States)	Ross Colton	C	L	29	2023	Robbinsville, New Jersey
18	(United States)	Jack Drury	C	L	25	2025	New York, New York
49	(Canada)	Sam Girard	D	L	27	2017	Roberval, Quebec
17	(Canada)	Parker Kelly	C	L	26	2024	Camrose, Alberta
94	(Finland)	Joel Kiviranta	LW	L	29	2023	Vantaa, Finland
92	(Sweden)	Gabriel Landeskog (C)	LW	L	33	2011	Stockholm, Sweden
62	(Finland)	Artturi Lehkonen	LW	L	30	2022	Piikkiö, Finland
4	(United States)	Jacob MacDonald	D	L	32	2024	Portland, Oregon
29	(Canada)	Nathan MacKinnon (A)	C	R	30	2013	Halifax, Nova Scotia
8	(Canada)	Cale Makar (A)	D	R	27	2017	Calgary, Alberta
70	(United States)	Sam Malinski	D	R	27	2023	Lakeville, Minnesota
42	(United States)	Josh Manson	D	R	34	2022	Hinsdale, Illinois
88	(Czech Republic)	Martin Necas	C	R	26	2025	Nové Město na Moravě, Czech Republic
11	(United States)	Brock Nelson	C	L	34	2025	Warroad, Minnesota
13	(Russia)	Valeri Nichushkin	RW	L	30	2019	Chelyabinsk, Russia
25	(Canada)	Logan O'Connor	RW	R	29	2018	Missouri City, Texas
95	(Sweden)	Victor Olofsson	RW	L	30	2025	Örnsköldsvik, Sweden
28	(Belarus)	Ilya Solovyov	D	L	25	2025	Mogilev, Belarus
7	(Canada)	Devon Toews	D	L	31	2020	Abbotsford, British Columbia
41	(Canada)	Scott Wedgewood	G	L	33	2024	Brampton, Ontario

=== Dallas Stars ===
Updated November 18, 2025

No.	Nat	Player	Pos	S/G	Age	Acquired	Birthplace
10	(Sweden)	Oskar Back	C	L	25	2018	Karlstad, Sweden
11	(Canada)	Nathan Bastian	RW	R	27	2025	Kitchener, Ontario
14	(Canada)	Jamie Benn (C)	LW	L	36	2007	Victoria, British Columbia
6	(Switzerland)	Lian Bichsel	D	L	21	2022	Olten, Switzerland
15	(United States)	Colin Blackwell	C	R	32	2024	North Andover, Massachusetts
22	(Canada)	Mavrik Bourque	C	R	23	2020	Plessisville, Quebec
20	(Canada)	Kyle Capobianco	D	L	28	2024	Mississauga, Ontario
1	(United States)	Casey DeSmith	G	L	34	2024	Rochester, New Hampshire
95	(Canada)	Matt Duchene	C	L	34	2023	Haliburton, Ontario
73	(United States)	Adam Erne	LW	L	30	2025	New Haven, Connecticut
12	(Czech Republic)	Radek Faksa	C	L	31	2025	Vitkov, Czech Republic
55	(Canada)	Thomas Harley	D	L	24	2019	Syracuse, New York
4	(Finland)	Miro Heiskanen (A)	D	L	26	2017	Espoo, Finland
24	(Finland)	Roope Hintz (A)	C/LW	L	29	2015	Tampere, Finland
49	(Canada)	Justin Hryckowian	C	L	24	2024	L'Île-Bizard, Quebec
53	(Canada)	Wyatt Johnston	C	R	22	2021	Toronto, Ontario
44	(Belarus)	Vladislav Kolyachonok	D	L	24	2025	Minsk, Belarus
23	(Finland)	Esa Lindell (A)	D	L	31	2012	Helsinki, Finland
5	(Sweden)	Nils Lundkvist	D	R	25	2022	Piteå, Sweden
46	(Russia)	Ilya Lyubushkin	D	R	31	2024	Moscow, Russia
29	(United States)	Jake Oettinger	G	L	26	2017	Lakeville, Minnesota
28	(Canada)	Alex Petrovic	D	R	33	2021	Edmonton, Alberta
96	(Finland)	Mikko Rantanen	RW	L	29	2025	Nousiainen, Finland
21	(United States)	Jason Robertson	LW	L	26	2017	Arcadia, California
91	(Canada)	Tyler Seguin (A)	C	R	33	2013	Brampton, Ontario
18	(Canada)	Sam Steel	C	L	27	2023	Ardrossan, Alberta

=== Minnesota Wild ===
Updated November 21, 2025

No.	Nat	Player	Pos	S/G	Age	Acquired	Birthplace
24	(United States)	Zach Bogosian	D	R	35	2023	Massena, New York
12	(United States)	Matt Boldy	RW	L	24	2019	Millis, Massachusetts
25	(Sweden)	Jonas Brodin	D	L	32	2011	Karlstad, Sweden
8	(United States)	Zeev Buium	D	L	19	2024	Laguna Niguel, California
14	(Sweden)	Joel Eriksson Ek	C	L	28	2015	Karlstad, Sweden
7	(United States)	Brock Faber	D	R	23	2022	Maple Grove, Minnesota
17	(Canada)	Marcus Foligno (A)	RW	L	34	2017	Buffalo, New York
32	(Sweden)	Filip Gustavsson	G	L	27	2022	Skellefteå, Sweden
43	(Canada)	Hunter Haight	C	R	21	2022	Strathroy, Ontario
38	(United States)	Ryan Hartman	C	R	31	2019	Hilton Head Island, South Carolina
18	(United States)	Vinnie Hinostroza	C	L	31	2025	Melrose Park, Illinois
48	(Canada)	Daemon Hunt	D	L	23	2025	Brandon, Manitoba
90	(Sweden)	Marcus Johansson	C	L	35	2023	Landskrona, Sweden
39	(Canada)	Ben Jones	C	L	26	2024	Waterloo, Ontario
97	(Russia)	Kirill Kaprizov (A)	LW	L	28	2015	Novokuznetsk, Russia
5	(Canada)	Jacob Middleton	D	L	29	2022	Stratford, Ontario
28	(Sweden)	Liam Ohgren	LW	L	21	2022	Stockholm, Sweden
19	(United States)	Tyler Pitlick	C	R	34	2025	Minneapolis, Minnesota
23	(Austria)	Marco Rossi	C	L	24	2020	Feldkirch, Austria
46	(Canada)	Jared Spurgeon (C)	D	R	35	2010	Edmonton, Alberta
78	(Germany)	Nico Sturm	RW	L	30	2025	Augsburg, Germany
91	(Russia)	Vladimir Tarasenko	LW	L	33	2025	Yaroslavl, Russia
13	(Russia)	Yakov Trenin	C	R	28	2024	Chelyabinsk, Russia
30	(Sweden)	Jesper Wallstedt	G	L	23	2021	Västerås, Sweden
22	(Russia)	Danila Yurov	RW	L	21	2022	Chelyabinsk, Russia
36	(Norway)	Mats Zuccarello	RW	L	38	2019	Oslo, Norway

=== Nashville Predators ===
Updated October 23, 2025

No.	Nat	Player	Pos	S/G	Age	Acquired	Birthplace
29	(Finland)	Justus Annunen	G	L	25	2024	Kempele, Finland
20	(Canada)	Justin Barron	D	R	24	2024	Halifax, Nova Scotia
37	(United States)	Nick Blankenburg	D	R	27	2024	Washington Township, Michigan
58	(Canada)	Michael Bunting	LW	L	30	2025	Scarborough, Ontario
77	(Canada)	Luke Evangelista	RW	R	23	2020	Oakville, Ontario
9	(Sweden)	Filip Forsberg (A)	LW	R	31	2013	Östervåla, Sweden
41	(Canada)	Nicolas Hague	D	L	26	2025	Kitchener, Ontario
56	(Finland)	Erik Haula	LW	L	34	2025	Pori, Finland
59	(Switzerland)	Roman Josi (C)	D	L	35	2008	Bern, Switzerland
17	(Canada)	Tyson Jost	C	L	27	2025	St. Albert, Alberta
81	(Canada)	Jonathan Marchessault	C	R	34	2024	Cap-Rouge, Quebec
47	(United States)	Michael McCarron	C	R	30	2020	Grosse Pointe, Michigan
90	(Canada)	Ryan O'Reilly (A)	C	L	34	2023	Clinton, Ontario
48	(United States)	Nick Perbix	D	R	27	2025	Elk River, Minnesota
74	(Finland)	Juuse Saros	G	L	30	2013	Forssa, Finland
76	(United States)	Brady Skjei	D	L	31	2024	Lakeville, Minnesota
36	(United States)	Cole Smith	LW	L	30	2020	Brainerd, Minnesota
91	(Canada)	Steven Stamkos	C	R	35	2024	Markham, Ontario
24	(United States)	Spencer Stastney	D	L	25	2018	Mequon, Wisconsin
40	(Russia)	Fedor Svechkov	C	L	22	2021	Tolyatti, Russia
89	(Canada)	Ozzy Wiesblatt	RW	R	23	2024	Calgary, Alberta
83	(Sweden)	Adam Wilsby	D	L	25	2020	Stockholm, Sweden
71	(Canada)	Matthew Wood	LW	R	20	2023	Lethbridge, Alberta

=== St. Louis Blues ===
Updated November 21, 2025

No.	Nat	Player	Pos	S/G	Age	Acquired	Birthplace
50	(Canada)	Jordan Binnington	G	L	32	2011	Richmond Hill, Ontario
77	(United States)	Nick Bjugstad	C	R	33	2025	Minneapolis, Minnesota
6	(Sweden)	Philip Broberg	D	L	24	2024	Orebro, Sweden
89	(Russia)	Pavel Buchnevich	LW	L	30	2021	Cherepovets, Russia
54	(Slovakia)	Dalibor Dvorsky	RW	L	20	2023	Zvolen, Slovakia
72	(United States)	Justin Faulk (A)	D	R	33	2019	South St. Paul, Minnesota
17	(United States)	Cam Fowler	D	L	33	2024	Windsor, Ontario
30	(Canada)	Joel Hofer	G	L	25	2018	Winnipeg, Manitoba
81	(Canada)	Dylan Holloway	LW	L	24	2024	Calgary, Alberta
71	(Canada)	Mathieu Joseph	RW	L	28	2024	Laval, Quebec
51	(United States)	Matthew Kessel	D	R	25	2020	Bloomfield Hills, Michigan
25	(Canada)	Jordan Kyrou	RW	R	27	2016	Toronto, Ontario
63	(Canada)	Jake Neighbours	LW	L	23	2020	Calgary, Alberta
55	(Canada)	Colton Parayko (A)	D	R	32	2012	St. Albert, Alberta
10	(Canada)	Brayden Schenn (C)	C	L	34	2017	Saskatoon, Saskatchewan
21	(United States)	Jimmy Snuggerud	RW	R	21	2022	Minneapolis, Minnesota
70	(Sweden)	Oskar Sundqvist	C	R	31	2023	Boden, Sweden
22	(Switzerland)	Pius Suter	C	L	29	2025	Zurich, Switzerland
18	(Canada)	Robert Thomas (A)	C	R	26	2017	Aurora, Ontario
13	(Russia)	Alexey Toropchenko	RW	L	26	2017	Moscow, Russia
75	(Canada)	Tyler Tucker	D	L	25	2018	Thunder Bay, Ontario
26	(Australia)	Nathan Walker	LW	L	31	2019	Cardiff, Wales

=== Utah Mammoth ===
Updated October 22, 2025

No.	Nat	Player	Pos	S/G	Age	Acquired	Birthplace
53	(Canada)	Michael Carcone	LW	L	29	2024	Ajax, Ontario
28	(United States)	Ian Cole	D	L	36	2024	Ann Arbor, Michigan
92	(United States)	Logan Cooley	C	L	21	2024	Pittsburgh, Pennsylvania
67	(Canada)	Lawson Crouse (A)	LW	L	28	2024	Mount Brydges, Ontario
57	(United States)	Nick DeSimone	D	R	31	2025	East Amherst, New York
50	(Canada)	Sean Durzi	D	R	27	2024	Toronto, Ontario
11	(Canada)	Dylan Guenther	RW	R	22	2024	Edmonton, Alberta
27	(Canada)	Barrett Hayton	C	L	25	2024	Peterborough, Ontario
9	(United States)	Clayton Keller (C)	C	L	27	2024	Chesterfield, Missouri
15	(Canada)	Alexander Kerfoot (A)	C	L	31	2024	Vancouver, British Columbia
2	(Finland)	Olli Maatta	D	L	31	2024	Jyväskylä, Finland
6	(United States)	John Marino	D	R	28	2024	North Easton, Massachusetts
22	(Canada)	Jack McBain	C	L	25	2024	Toronto, Ontario
38	(Canada)	Liam O'Brien	LW	L	31	2024	Halifax, Nova Scotia
77	(Germany)	JJ Peterka	LW	L	23	2025	Munich, Germany
98	(Russia)	Mikhail Sergachev (A)	D	L	27	2024	Nizhnekamsk, Russia
8	(United States)	Nick Schmaltz	C	R	29	2024	Madison, Wisconsin
88	(United States)	Nate Schmidt	D	L	34	2025	St. Cloud, Minnesota
26	(Russia)	Dmitri Simashev	D	L	20	2024	Kostroma, Russia
82	(Sweden)	Kevin Stenlund	C	L	29	2024	Stockholm, Sweden
13	(Canada)	Brandon Tanev	LW	L	33	2025	Toronto, Ontario
4	(Finland)	Juuso Valimaki	D	L	27	2024	Tampere, Finland
41	(Czech Republic)	Vitek Vanecek	G	L	29	2025	Havlíčkův Brod, Czech Republic
70	(Czech Republic)	Karel Vejmelka	G	R	29	2024	Třebíč, Czech Republic
56	(United States)	Kailer Yamamoto	RW	R	27	2024	Spokane, Washington

=== Winnipeg Jets ===
Updated October 22, 2025

No.	Nat	Player	Pos	S/G	Age	Acquired	Birthplace
36	(Canada)	Morgan Barron	C	L	26	2022	Halifax, Nova Scotia
90	(Russia)	Nikita Chibrikov	RW	L	22	2021	Moscow, Russia
1	(Canada)	Eric Comrie	G	L	30	2024	Edmonton, Alberta
81	(United States)	Kyle Connor	LW	L	28	2015	Clinton Township, Michigan
2	(Canada)	Dylan DeMelo	D	R	32	2020	London, Ontario
24	(Canada)	Haydn Fleury	D	L	29	2024	Carlyle, Saskatchewan
25	(United States)	Parker Ford	C	R	25	2023	Wakefield, Rhode Island
37	(United States)	Connor Hellebuyck	G	L	32	2012	Commerce, Michigan
9	(United States)	Alex Iafallo	LW/C	L	31	2023	Eden, New York
45	(United States)	Cole Koepke	LW	L	27	2025	Two Harbors, Minnesota
93	(Finland)	Brad Lambert	C	R	21	2022	Lahti, Finland
17	(Canada)	Adam Lowry (C)	C	L	32	2011	St. Louis, Missouri
6	(Canada)	Colin Miller	D	R	33	2024	Sault Ste. Marie, Ontario
44	(Canada)	Josh Morrissey (A)	D	L	30	2013	Calgary, Alberta
7	(Russia)	Vladislav Namestnikov	C	L	33	2023	Voskresensk, Russia
62	(Switzerland)	Nino Niederreiter	RW	L	33	2023	Chur, Switzerland
14	(Sweden)	Gustav Nyquist	C	L	36	2025	Halmstad, Sweden
70	(Canada)	Tanner Pearson	LW	L	33	2025	Kitchener, Ontario
91	(Canada)	Cole Perfetti	C	L	23	2020	Whitby, Ontario
4	(United States)	Neal Pionk	D	R	30	2019	Omaha, Nebraska
54	(United States)	Dylan Samberg	D	L	26	2017	Hermantown, Minnesota
55	(Canada)	Mark Scheifele (A)	C	R	32	2011	Kitchener, Ontario
5	(Canada)	Luke Schenn	D	R	36	2025	Saskatoon, Saskatchewan
64	(Canada)	Logan Stanley	D	L	27	2016	Kitchener, Ontario
19	(Canada)	Jonathan Toews	C	L	37	2025	Winnipeg, Manitoba
13	(Canada)	Gabriel Vilardi	C	R	26	2023	Kingston, Ontario

== See also ==
- List of current NHL Eastern Conference team rosters
