= List of current NHL Eastern Conference team rosters =

This is a list of current National Hockey League (NHL) Eastern Conference team rosters:

== Atlantic Division ==
=== Boston Bruins ===
Updated October 7, 2026

No.	Nat	Player	Pos	S/G	Age	Acquired	Birthplace
45	(Canada)	Jonathan Aspirot	D	L	27	2025	Mascouche, Quebec
17	(United States)	Will Borgen	D	R	29	2026	Moorhead, Minnesota
59	(Canada)	Frederic Brunet	D	L	23	2022	Gatineau, Quebec
75	(United States)	Connor Clifton	D	R	31	2026	Long Branch, New Jersey
30	(Canada)	Michael DiPietro	G	L	27	2022	Windsor, Ontario
39	(Canada)	Morgan Geekie	RW	R	28	2023	Strathclair, Manitoba
44	(United States)	James Hagens	C	L	19	2025	Hauppauge, New York
84	(Canada)	Tanner Jeannot (A)	LW	L	29	2025	Oxbow, Saskatchewan
47	(United States)	Mark Kastelic	C	R	27	2024	Phoenix, Arizona
92	(Russia)	Marat Khusnutdinov	C	L	24	2025	Moscow, Russia
52	(United States)	Sean Kuraly	C	L	33	2025	Lewiston, New York
28	(Sweden)	Elias Lindholm	C	R	31	2024	Boden, Sweden
27	(Sweden)	Hampus Lindholm (A)	D	L	32	2022	Helsingborg, Sweden
6	(United States)	Mason Lohrei	D	L	25	2020	Baton Rouge, Louisiana
73	(United States)	Charlie McAvoy (A)	D	R	28	2016	Long Beach, New York
93	(Canada)	Fraser Minten	C	L	22	2025	Vancouver, British Columbia
11	(United States)	Casey Mittelstadt	C	L	27	2025	Eden Prairie, Minnesota
88	(Czech Republic)	David Pastrňák (C)	RW	R	30	2014	Havířov, Czech Republic
10	(Germany)	JJ Peterka	LW	L	24	2026	Munich, Germany
51	(Canada)	Matt Poitras	C	R	22	2022	Ajax, Ontario
1	(United States)	Jeremy Swayman	G	L	27	2017	Anchorage, Alaska
18	(Czech Republic)	Pavel Zacha	C	L	29	2022	Brno, Czech Republic
91	(Russia)	Nikita Zadorov	D	L	31	2024	Moscow, Russia

=== Buffalo Sabres ===
Updated October 23, 2026

No.	Nat	Player	Pos	S/G	Age	Acquired	Birthplace
6	(Canada)	Zach Benson	LW	L	21	2023	Langley, British Columbia
10	(Canada)	Sam Carrick	C	R	34	2026	Markham, Ontario
46	(Canada)	Louis Crevier	D	R	25	2026	Quebec City, Quebec
26	(Sweden)	Rasmus Dahlin (C)	D	L	26	2018	Trollhättan, Sweden
15	(Canada)	Justin Danforth	RW	R	33	2025	Oshawa, Ontario
91	(United States)	Josh Doan	RW	R	24	2025	Scottsdale, Arizona
92	(Canada)	Colten Ellis	G	L	26	2025	River Denys, Nova Scotia
44	(United States)	Dennis Gilbert	D	L	29	2026	Buffalo, New York
24	(United States)	Matt Grzelcyk	D	L	32	2026	Boston, Massachusetts
94	(Finland)	Konsta Helenius	C	R	20	2024	Ylöjärvi, Finland
48	(Canada)	Tyson Kozak	C	L	23	2021	Souris, Manitoba
19	(Canada)	Peyton Krebs	C	L	25	2021	Okotoks, Alberta
20	(Czech Republic)	Jiří Kulich	C	L	22	2022	Kadaň, Czech Republic
1	(Finland)	Ukko-Pekka Luukkonen	G	L	27	2017	Espoo, Finland
34	(United States)	Alex Lyon	G	L	33	2025	Baudette, Minnesota
29	(Canada)	Beck Malenstyn	LW	L	28	2024	Delta, British Columbia
71	(Canada)	Ryan McLeod	C	L	27	2024	Mississauga, Ontario
73	(United States)	Zach Metsa	D	R	28	2025	Delafield, Wisconsin
9	(United States)	Josh Norris	C	L	27	2025	Oxford, Michigan
86	(Sweden)	Noah Östlund	C	L	22	2022	Nykvarn, Sweden
25	(Canada)	Owen Power	D	L	23	2021	Mississauga, Ontario
22	(Canada)	Jack Quinn	RW	R	25	2020	Ottawa, Ontario
23	(United States)	Mattias Samuelsson (A)	D	L	26	2018	Philadelphia, Pennsylvania
72	(United States)	Tage Thompson (A)	C	R	28	2018	Phoenix, Arizona
21	(Canada)	Conor Timmins	D	R	28	2025	St. Catharines, Ontario
8	(Canada)	Olen Zellweger	D	L	23	2026	Calgary, Alberta
17	(United States)	Jason Zucker	LW	L	34	2024	Newport Beach, California

=== Detroit Red Wings ===
Updated October 22, 2026

No.	Nat	Player	Pos	S/G	Age	Acquired	Birthplace
22	(United States)	Mason Appleton	C	R	30	2025	Green Bay, Wisconsin
33	(Sweden)	Viktor Arvidsson	RW	R	33	2026	Kusmark, Sweden
28	(Norway)	Michael Brandsegg-Nygård	RW	R	21	2024	Oslo, Norway
8	(Canada)	Ben Chiarot	D	L	35	2022	Hamilton, Ontario
37	(United States)	J. T. Compher	LW	R	31	2023	Northbrook, Illinois
18	(United States)	Andrew Copp	C	L	32	2022	Ann Arbor, Michigan
29	(Canada)	Nate Danielson	C	R	22	2023	Red Deer, Alberta
93	(United States)	Alex DeBrincat	RW	R	28	2023	Farmington Hills, Michigan
77	(Sweden)	Simon Edvinsson (RFA)	D	L	23	2021	Onsala, Sweden
24	(Sweden)	Andreas Englund	D	L	30	2026	Stockholm, Sweden
72	(United States)	Justin Faulk	D	R	34	2026	South St. Paul, Minnesota
58	(Canada)	Emmitt Finnie	LW	L	21	2023	Lethbridge, Alberta
36	(United States)	John Gibson	G	L	33	2025	Pittsburgh, Pennsylvania
20	(Sweden)	Albert Johansson	D	L	25	2019	Karlstad, Sweden
42	(Sweden)	Anton Johansson	D	R	22	2022	Stockholm, Sweden
92	(Austria)	Marco Kasper	C	L	22	2022	Innsbruck, Austria
55	(Canada)	Keegan Kolesar	RW	R	29	2026	Brandon, Manitoba
71	(United States)	Dylan Larkin	C	L	30	2014	Waterford, Michigan
34	(United States)	Carter Mazur	LW	R	24	2021	Jackson, Michigan
35	(Czech Republic)	Michal Postava	G	L	24	2025	Valašské Meziříčí, Czech Republic
27	(Canada)	Michael Rasmussen	C	L	27	2017	Vancouver, British Columbia
23	(Sweden)	Lucas Raymond (A)	LW	R	24	2020	Gothenburg, Sweden
44	(Sweden)	Axel Sandin-Pellikka	D	R	21	2023	Gällivare, Sweden
53	(Germany)	Moritz Seider (A)	D	R	25	2019	Zell, Germany
80	(Russia)	Daniil Tarasov	G	L	27	2026	Novokuznetsk, Russia
54	(Sweden)	William Wallinder	D	L	24	2020	Sollefteå, Sweden

=== Florida Panthers ===
Updated October 20, 2026

No.	Nat	Player	Pos	S/G	Age	Acquired	Birthplace
26	(Latvia)	Uvis Balinskis	D	L	30	2023	Ventspils, Latvia
16	(Finland)	Aleksander Barkov (C)	C	L	31	2013	Tampere, Finland
9	(Canada)	Sam Bennett	C	L	30	2021	East Gwillimbury, Ontario
31	(United States)	Cooper Black	G	R	25	2026	Alpena, Michigan
5	(Canada)	Aaron Ekblad (A)	D	R	30	2014	Windsor, Ontario
20	(Denmark)	Lars Eller	C	L	37	2026	Rødovre, Denmark
42	(Sweden)	Gustav Forsling	D	L	30	2021	Linköping, Sweden
12	(Canada)	Jonah Gadjovich	LW	L	28	2023	Whitby, Ontario
6	(Czech Republic)	Radko Gudas	D	R	36	2026	Prague, Czechoslovakia
21	(United States)	Garnet Hathaway	RW	R	34	2026	Naples, Florida
14	(Canada)	Bokondji Imama	LW	L	30	2026	Montreal, Quebec
3	(United States)	Seth Jones	D	R	32	2025	Arlington, Texas
7	(Russia)	Dmitry Kulikov	D	L	36	2023	Lipetsk, Soviet Union
18	(United States)	Sam Lafferty	C	R	31	2026	Hollidaysburg, Pennsylvania
15	(Finland)	Anton Lundell	C	L	25	2020	Espoo, Finland
27	(Finland)	Eetu Luostarinen	C	L	28	2020	Siilinjärvi, Finland
63	(Canada)	Brad Marchand	LW	L	38	2025	Halifax, Nova Scotia
25	(Sweden)	Jacob Markström	G	L	36	2026	Gävle, Sweden
77	(Finland)	Niko Mikkola	D	L	30	2023	Kiiminki, Finland
13	(Canada)	Sam Reinhart	C	R	30	2021	North Vancouver, British Columbia
40	(Switzerland)	Akira Schmid	G	L	26	2026	Bern, Switzerland
8	(United States)	Brady Tkachuk	LW	L	27	2026	Scottsdale, Arizona
19	(United States)	Matthew Tkachuk (A)	LW	L	28	2022	Scottsdale, Arizona
23	(Canada)	Carter Verhaeghe	C	L	31	2020	Toronto, Ontario
95	(Latvia)	Sandis Vilmanis	LW	L	22	2024	Riga, Latvia

=== Montreal Canadiens ===
Updated October 25, 2026

No.	Nat	Player	Pos	S/G	Age	Acquired	Birthplace
17	(Canada)	Josh Anderson (A)	RW	R	32	2020	Burlington, Ontario
62	(Canada)	Owen Beck	C	R	22	2022	Port Hope, Ontario
76	(Canada)	Zachary Bolduc	LW	L	23	2025	Trois-Rivières, Quebec
45	(Canada)	Alexandre Carrier	D	R	30	2024	Quebec City, Quebec
13	(United States)	Cole Caufield	RW	R	25	2019	Mosinee, Wisconsin
77	(Canada)	Kirby Dach	C	R	25	2022	Fort Saskatchewan, Alberta
24	(Canada)	Phillip Danault	C	L	33	2025	Victoriaville, Quebec
93	(Russia)	Ivan Demidov	RW	L	20	2024	Sergiyev Posad, Russia
75	(Czech Republic)	Jakub Dobeš	G	L	25	2020	Ostrava, Czech Republic
53	(Canada)	Noah Dobson	D	R	26	2025	Summerside, Prince Edward Island
42	(Sweden)	Adam Engström	D	L	22	2022	Jarna, Sweden
71	(Canada)	Jake Evans	C	R	30	2014	Toronto, Ontario
32	(United States)	Jacob Fowler	G	L	22	2023	Melbourne, Florida
21	(Canada)	Kaiden Guhle	D	L	24	2020	Sherwood Park, Alberta
48	(United States)	Lane Hutson	D	L	22	2022	Holland, Michigan
91	(Finland)	Oliver Kapanen	C	R	23	2021	Timrå, Sweden
22	(United States)	Chris Kreider	LW	L	35	2026	Boxford, Massachusetts
8	(Canada)	Mike Matheson (A)	D	L	32	2022	Pointe-Claire, Quebec
35	(Canada)	Sam Montembeault	G	L	29	2021	Bécancour, Quebec
15	(Canada)	Alex Newhook	C	L	25	2023	St. John's, Newfoundland
20	(Slovakia)	Juraj Slafkovský	LW	L	22	2022	Košice, Slovakia
14	(Canada)	Nick Suzuki (C)	C	R	27	2018	London, Ontario
85	(France)	Alexandre Texier	LW	L	27	2025	Saint-Martin-d'Hères, France
72	(Canada)	Arber Xhekaj	D	L	25	2021	Hamilton, Ontario
63	(Canada)	Florian Xhekaj	LW	L	22	2023	Hamilton, Ontario

=== Ottawa Senators ===
Updated October 29, 2026

No.	Nat	Player	Pos	S/G	Age	Acquired	Birthplace
22	(Canada)	Michael Amadio	RW	R	30	2024	Sault Ste. Marie, Ontario
19	(Canada)	Drake Batherson	RW	R	28	2017	Fort Wayne, Indiana
95	(Sweden)	André Burakovsky	LW	L	31	2026	Klagenfurt, Austria
72	(Canada)	Thomas Chabot (C)	D	L	29	2015	Sainte-Marie, Quebec
21	(Canada)	Nick Cousins	C	L	33	2024	Belleville, Ontario
24	(Canada)	Dylan Cozens	C	R	25	2025	Whitehorse, Yukon
27	(Sweden)	William Eklund	LW	L	24	2026	Haninge, Sweden
30	(Sweden)	Samuel Ersson	G	L	27	2026	Falun, Sweden
37	(Canada)	Warren Foegele	LW	L	30	2026	Markham, Ontario
28	(Canada)	Claude Giroux (A)	RW	R	38	2022	Hearst, Ontario
71	(Canada)	Ridly Greig	C	L	24	2020	Calgary, Alberta
34	(Canada)	Stephen Halliday	C	L	24	2022	Ajax, Ontario
42	(Canada)	Hayden Hodgson	RW	R	30	2024	Windsor, Ontario
31	(Sweden)	Jonas Johansson	G	L	31	2026	Gävle, Sweden
43	(United States)	Tyler Kleven	D	L	24	2020	Fargo, North Dakota
33	(Finland)	Nikolas Matinpalo	D	R	28	2023	Espoo, Finland
12	(United States)	Shane Pinto	C	R	25	2019	Franklin Square, New York
85	(United States)	Jake Sanderson (A)	D	L	24	2020	Whitefish, Montana
10	(Canada)	Jordan Spence	D	R	25	2025	Sydney, Australia
18	(Germany)	Tim Stützle (A)	C	L	24	2020	Viersen, Germany
35	(Sweden)	Linus Ullmark	G	L	33	2024	Lugnvik, Sweden
26	(Canada)	Carter Yakemchuk	D	R	21	2024	Fort McMurray, Alberta
20	(Sweden)	Fabian Zetterlund	LW	R	27	2025	Karlstad, Sweden
2	(Russia)	Artem Zub	D	R	31	2020	Khabarovsk, Russia

=== Tampa Bay Lightning ===
Updated October 17, 2026

No.	Nat	Player	Pos	S/G	Age	Acquired	Birthplace
74	(United States)	John Carlson	D	R	36	2026	Natick, Massachusetts
81	(Slovakia)	Erik Černák	D	R	29	2017	Košice, Slovakia
71	(Canada)	Anthony Cirelli	C	L	29	2015	Woodbridge, Ontario
24	(Canada)	Max Crozier	D	R	26	2019	North Vancouver, British Columbia
51	(Canada)	Charle-Edouard D'Astous	D	L	28	2025	Rimouski, Quebec
94	(Canada)	Conor Geekie	C	L	22	2024	Minnedosa, Manitoba
28	(Latvia)	Zemgus Girgensons	LW	L	32	2024	Riga, Latvia
93	(Canada)	Gage Goncalves	C	R	25	2020	Mission, British Columbia
37	(Canada)	Yanni Gourde	C	L	34	2025	Saint-Narcisse, Quebec
59	(United States)	Jake Guentzel	LW	L	32	2024	Omaha, Nebraska
38	(Canada)	Brandon Hagel	LW	L	28	2022	Saskatoon, Saskatchewan
77	(Sweden)	Victor Hedman (C)	D	L	35	2009	Örnsköldsvik, Sweden
35	(Sweden)	Dennis Hildeby	G	L	25	2026	Järfälla, Sweden
29	(Sweden)	Pontus Holmberg	RW	L	27	2025	Västerås, Sweden
17	(United States)	Dominic James	C	L	24	2025	Plymouth, Michigan
86	(Russia)	Nikita Kucherov (A)	RW	L	33	2011	Maykop, Russia
78	(Norway)	Emil Lilleberg	D	L	25	2023	Sarpsborg, Norway
27	(United States)	Ryan McDonagh (A)	D	L	37	2024	Saint Paul, Minnesota
95	(Russia)	Ilya Mikheyev	RW	L	32	2026	Omsk, Russia
90	(Switzerland)	J. J. Moser	D	L	26	2024	Biel, Switzerland
21	(Canada)	Brayden Point	C	R	30	2014	Calgary, Alberta
49	(Canada)	Scott Sabourin	RW	R	34	2025	Orleans, Ontario
88	(Russia)	Andrei Vasilevskiy	G	L	32	2012	Tyumen, Russia
25	(Canada)	Jeffrey Viel	LW	L	29	2026	Rimouski, Quebec

=== Toronto Maple Leafs ===
Updated October 28, 2026

No.	Nat	Player	Pos	S/G	Age	Acquired	Birthplace
3	(United States)	Nick Blankenburg	D	R	28	2026	Washington Township, Michigan
73	(Latvia)	Teddy Blueger	C	L	32	2026	Riga, Latvia
72	(Russia)	Sergei Bobrovsky	G	L	38	2026	Novokuznetsk, Soviet Union
53	(Canada)	Easton Cowan	RW	L	21	2023	Mount Brydges, Ontario
11	(Canada)	Max Domi	LW	L	31	2023	Winnipeg, Manitoba
24	(United States)	Brandon Duhaime	LW	L	29	2026	Coral Springs, Florida
95	(Sweden)	Oliver Ekman-Larsson	D	L	35	2024	Karlskrona, Sweden
29	(Canada)	Benoit-Olivier Groulx	C	L	26	2025	Rouen, France
81	(United States)	Dakota Joshua	C	L	30	2025	Dearborn, Michigan
71	(United States)	Vinni Lettieri	C	R	31	2025	Excelsior, Minnesota
19	(Canada)	Zack MacEwen	C	R	30	2026	Charlottetown, Prince Edward Island
86	(Russia)	Kirill Marchenko	RW	R	26	2026	Barnaul, Russia
34	(United States)	Auston Matthews (C)	C	L	29	2016	San Ramon, California
22	(United States)	Jake McCabe	D	L	33	2023	Eau Claire, Wisconsin
92	(Canada)	Gavin McKenna	LW	L	18	2026	Whitehorse, Yukon
82	(Canada)	Cole McWard	D	R	25	2026	Fenton, Missouri
36	(United States)	Dakota Mermis	D	L	32	2025	Alton, Illinois
90	(Latvia)	Elvis Merzļikins	G	L	32	2026	Riga, Latvia
88	(Sweden)	William Nylander	RW	R	30	2014	Calgary, Alberta
20	(Canada)	Nick Paul	LW	L	31	2026	Mississauga, Ontario
43	(Canada)	Darren Raddysh	D	R	30	2026	Caledon, Ontario
44	(Canada)	Morgan Rielly (A)	D	L	32	2012	West Vancouver, British Columbia
83	(Canada)	Marshall Rifai	D	L	28	2023	Beaconsfield, Quebec
96	(United States)	Jack Roslovic	C	R	29	2026	Columbus, Ohio
15	(Canada)	Colton Sissons	C	R	32	2026	North Vancouver, British Columbia
28	(Canada)	Troy Stecher	D	R	32	2025	Richmond, British Columbia
41	(United States)	Anthony Stolarz	G	L	32	2024	Edison, New Jersey
8	(Canada)	Christopher Tanev	D	R	36	2024	East York, Ontario
91	(Canada)	John Tavares (A)	C	L	36	2018	Mississauga, Ontario
76	(Canada)	William Villeneuve	D	R	24	2020	Sherbrooke, Quebec
18	(United States)	Miles Wood	LW	L	31	2026	Buffalo, New York

== Metropolitan Division ==
=== Carolina Hurricanes ===
Updated October 28, 2026

No.	Nat	Player	Pos	S/G	Age	Acquired	Birthplace
20	(Finland)	Sebastian Aho (A)	C	L	29	2015	Rauma, Finland
53	(United States)	Jackson Blake	RW	R	23	2021	Fargo, North Dakota
32	(United States)	Brandon Bussi	G	R	28	2025	Sound Beach, New York
28	(Canada)	William Carrier	LW	L	31	2024	LaSalle, Quebec
5	(United States)	Jalen Chatfield	D	R	30	2021	Ypsilanti, Michigan
44	(Canada)	Nicolas Deslauriers	LW	L	35	2026	LaSalle, Quebec
27	(Denmark)	Nikolaj Ehlers	LW	L	30	2025	Aalborg, Denmark
4	(United States)	Shayne Gostisbehere	D	L	33	2024	Pembroke Pines, Florida
71	(Canada)	Taylor Hall	LW	L	34	2025	Calgary, Alberta
77	(Canada)	Mark Jankowski	C	L	32	2025	Hamilton, Ontario
24	(Canada)	Seth Jarvis	RW	R	24	2020	Winnipeg, Manitoba
52	(Russia)	Pyotr Kochetkov	G	L	27	2019	Penza, Russia
82	(Finland)	Jesperi Kotkaniemi	C	L	26	2021	Pori, Finland
48	(Canada)	Jordan Martinook (A)	LW	L	34	2018	Brandon, Manitoba
19	(United States)	K'Andre Miller	D	L	26	2025	St. Paul, Minnesota
21	(Russia)	Alexander Nikishin	D	L	25	2020	Oryol, Russia
6	(United States)	Mike Reilly	D	L	33	2025	Chicago, Illinois
50	(United States)	Eric Robinson	LW	L	31	2024	Bellmawr, New Jersey
74	(United States)	Jaccob Slavin (A)	D	L	32	2012	Erie, Colorado
11	(Canada)	Jordan Staal (C)	C	L	38	2012	Thunder Bay, Ontario
22	(Canada)	Logan Stankoven	C	R	23	2025	Kamloops, British Columbia
37	(Russia)	Andrei Svechnikov	RW	L	26	2018	Barnaul, Russia
8	(Finland)	Juuso Välimäki	D	L	28	2026	Tampere, Finland
26	(Canada)	Sean Walker	D	R	31	2024	Keswick, Ontario

=== Columbus Blue Jackets ===
Updated October 28, 2026

No.	Nat	Player	Pos	S/G	Age	Acquired	Birthplace
36	(Sweden)	Emil Andrae	D	L	24	2026	Västervik, Sweden
2	(Canada)	Jake Christiansen	D	L	27	2020	West Vancouver, British Columbia
3	(United States)	Charlie Coyle (A)	C	R	34	2025	Weymouth, Massachusetts
93	(Canada)	Luca Del Bel Belluz	C	L	22	2022	Woodbridge, Ontario
15	(Canada)	Dante Fabbro	D	R	28	2024	Coquitlam, British Columbia
19	(Canada)	Adam Fantilli	C	L	22	2023	Nobleton, Ontario
83	(United States)	Conor Garland	RW	R	30	2026	Scituate, Massachusetts
73	(Canada)	Jet Greaves	G	L	25	2022	Cambridge, Ontario
44	(Canada)	Erik Gudbranson	D	R	34	2022	Ottawa, Ontario
58	(Canada)	Danton Heinen	LW	L	31	2025	Langley, British Columbia
91	(Canada)	Kent Johnson	C	L	24	2021	Port Moody, British Columbia
89	(United States)	Matthew Knies	LW	L	24	2026	Phoenix, Arizona
94	(Canada)	Ryan Lomberg	LW	L	31	2026	Richmond Hill, Ontario
21	(Sweden)	Isac Lundeström	C	L	26	2025	Gällivare, Sweden
5	(Canada)	Denton Mateychuk	D	L	22	2022	Dominion City, Manitoba
23	(Canada)	Sean Monahan (A)	C	L	32	2024	Brampton, Ontario
43	(Russia)	Valeri Nichushkin	RW	L	31	2026	Chelyabinsk, Russia
24	(United States)	Mathieu Olivier (A)	RW	R	29	2022	Biloxi, Mississippi
9	(Russia)	Ivan Provorov	D	L	29	2023	Yaroslavl, Russia
78	(Canada)	Damon Severson	D	R	32	2023	Brandon, Manitoba
4	(Canada)	Cole Sillinger (A)	C	L	23	2021	Columbus, Ohio
7	(Canada)	Carson Soucy	D	L	32	2026	Viking, Alberta
33	(Canada)	Cam Talbot	G	L	39	2026	Caledonia, Ontario
10	(Russia)	Dmitri Voronkov	C	L	26	2019	Angarsk, Russia
8	(United States)	Zach Werenski (A)	D	L	29	2015	Grosse Pointe, Michigan

=== New Jersey Devils ===
Updated October 23, 2026

No.	Nat	Player	Pos	S/G	Age	Acquired	Birthplace
34	(Canada)	Jake Allen	G	L	36	2024	Fredericton, New Brunswick
70	(Sweden)	Jesper Boqvist	C	L	27	2026	Falun, Sweden
63	(Sweden)	Jesper Bratt (A)	LW	L	28	2017	Stockholm, Sweden
16	(Canada)	Connor Brown	RW	R	32	2025	Etobicoke, Ontario
24	(United States)	Seamus Casey	D	R	22	2022	Miami, Florida
47	(Canada)	Declan Chisholm	D	L	26	2026	Bowmanville, Ontario
5	(Canada)	Brenden Dillon	D	L	35	2024	Surrey, British Columbia
77	(Canada)	Luke Evangelista	RW	R	24	2026	Oakville, Ontario
12	(Canada)	Cody Glass	C	R	27	2025	Winnipeg, Manitoba
81	(Russia)	Arseni Gritsyuk	RW	L	25	2019	Krasnoyarsk, Russia
7	(Canada)	Dougie Hamilton	D	R	33	2021	Toronto, Ontario
37	(United States)	Connor Hellebuyck	G	L	33	2026	Commerce, Michigan
13	(Switzerland)	Nico Hischier (C)	C	L	27	2017	Brig, Switzerland
86	(United States)	Jack Hughes (A)	C	L	25	2019	Orlando, Florida
43	(United States)	Luke Hughes	D	L	23	2021	Manchester, New Hampshire
8	(Canada)	Johnathan Kovacevic	D	R	29	2024	Hamilton, Ontario
93	(Canada)	Amadeus Lombardi	C	L	23	2026	Newmarket, Ontario
39	(Canada)	Anthony Mantha	RW	L	32	2026	Longueuil, Quebec
28	(Switzerland)	Timo Meier	RW	L	30	2023	Herisau, Switzerland
22	(United States)	Brett Pesce	D	R	31	2024	Tarrytown, New York
1	(Canada)	Rémi Poirier	G	L	25	2026	Farnham, Quebec
17	(Canada)	Evan Rodrigues	C	R	33	2026	Toronto, Ontario
71	(Switzerland)	Jonas Siegenthaler	D	L	29	2021	Zürich, Switzerland

=== New York Islanders ===
Updated October 26, 2026

No.	Nat	Player	Pos	S/G	Age	Acquired	Birthplace
13	(Canada)	Mathew Barzal	C	R	29	2015	Coquitlam, British Columbia
26	(United States)	Mitchell Chaffee	RW	R	28	2026	Grand Rapids, Michigan
53	(Canada)	Casey Cizikas	C	L	35	2009	Toronto, Ontario
77	(United States)	Tony DeAngelo	D	R	31	2025	Sewell, New Jersey
11	(Canada)	Anthony Duclair	LW	L	31	2024	Pointe-Claire, Quebec
38	(Sweden)	Victor Eklund	RW	R	20	2025	Stockholm, Sweden
51	(Sweden)	Emil Heineman	LW	L	24	2025	Leksand, Sweden
92	(Sweden)	Simon Holmström	RW	L	25	2019	Tranås, Sweden
14	(Canada)	Bo Horvat (C)	C	L	31	2023	Rodney, Ontario
4	(United States)	Matthew Kessel	D	R	26	2026	Bloomfield Hills, Michigan
63	(Finland)	Matias Maccelli	LW	L	26	2026	Turku, Finland
32	(United States)	Kyle MacLean	C	L	27	2023	Livingston, New Jersey
24	(United States)	Scott Mayfield	D	R	34	2011	St. Louis, Missouri
44	(Canada)	Jean-Gabriel Pageau	C	R	33	2020	Ottawa, Ontario
81	(Czech Republic)	Ondřej Palát	LW	L	35	2026	Frýdek-Místek, Czechoslovakia
21	(United States)	Kyle Palmieri (A)	RW	R	35	2021	Smithtown, New York
3	(Canada)	Adam Pelech	D	L	32	2012	Toronto, Ontario
6	(Canada)	Ryan Pulock (A)	D	R	32	2013	Grandview, Manitoba
64	(Canada)	Calum Ritchie	C	R	21	2025	Brampton, Ontario
28	(Russia)	Alexander Romanov	D	L	26	2022	Moscow, Russia
48	(Canada)	Matthew Schaefer (A)	D	L	19	2025	Hamilton, Ontario
10	(Canada)	Brayden Schenn (A)	C	L	35	2026	Saskatoon, Saskatchewan
30	(Russia)	Ilya Sorokin	G	L	31	2014	Mezhdurechensk, Russia
8	(Canada)	Logan Stanley	D	L	28	2026	Kitchener, Ontario
40	(Russia)	Semyon Varlamov	G	L	38	2019	Kuybyshev, Soviet Union

=== New York Rangers ===
Updated October 25, 2026

No.	Nat	Player	Pos	S/G	Age	Acquired	Birthplace
28	(Denmark)	Oliver Bjorkstrand	RW	R	31	2026	Herning, Denmark
50	(Canada)	Will Cuylle	LW	L	24	2020	Toronto, Ontario
16	(Russia)	Pavel Dorofeyev	RW	L	26	2026	Nizhny Tagil, Russia
5	(Canada)	Sean Durzi	D	R	28	2026	Toronto, Ontario
23	(United States)	Adam Fox (A)	D	R	28	2019	Jericho, New York
33	(Canada)	Dylan Garand	G	L	24	2020	Victoria, British Columbia
44	(Russia)	Vladislav Gavrikov	D	L	30	2025	Yaroslavl, Russia
43	(United States)	Luke Glendening	C	R	37	2026	East Grand Rapids, Michigan
24	(Canada)	Tye Kartye	LW	L	25	2026	Kingston, Ontario
70	(Finland)	Joonas Korpisalo	G	L	32	2026	Pori, Finland
42	(United States)	Noah Laba	C	R	23	2022	Northville, Michigan
13	(Canada)	Alexis Lafrenière	LW	L	25	2020	Saint-Eustache, Quebec
10	(United States)	J. T. Miller (C)	LW	L	33	2025	East Palestine, Ohio
60	(United States)	Scott Morrow	D	R	23	2025	Darien, Connecticut
94	(United States)	Gabe Perreault	RW	R	21	2023	Sherbrooke, Quebec
26	(Sweden)	Marcus Pettersson	D	L	30	2026	Skellefteå, Sweden
14	(Canada)	Taylor Raddysh	RW	R	28	2025	Caledon, Ontario
47	(Canada)	James Reimer	G	L	38	2026	Arborg, Manitoba
73	(Canada)	Matt Rempe	C	R	24	2020	Calgary, Alberta
4	(Canada)	Braden Schneider	D	R	25	2020	Prince Albert, Saskatchewan
31	(Russia)	Igor Shesterkin	G	L	30	2014	Moscow, Russia
38	(Slovakia)	Adam Sýkora	LW	L	22	2022	Piešťany, Slovakia
12	(Latvia)	Alberts Šmits	D	L	18	2026	Valmiera, Latvia
17	(Finland)	Eeli Tolvanen	RW	L	27	2026	Vihti, Finland
90	(Canada)	Joe Veleno	C	L	26	2026	Montreal, Quebec
93	(Sweden)	Mika Zibanejad (A)	C	R	33	2016	Huddinge, Sweden

=== Philadelphia Flyers ===
Updated October 29, 2026

No.	Nat	Player	Pos	S/G	Age	Acquired	Birthplace
52	(United States)	Noel Acciari	C	R	34	2026	Johnston, Rhode Island
86	(Canada)	Denver Barkey	C	L	21	2023	Newmarket, Ontario
44	(Canada)	Simon Benoit	D	L	28	2026	Laval, Quebec
59	(Canada)	Oliver Bonk	D	R	21	2023	Ottawa, Ontario
20	(United States)	Alex Bump	LW	L	22	2022	Prior Lake, Minnesota
58	(Canada)	Michael Bunting	LW	L	31	2026	Scarborough, Ontario
27	(United States)	Noah Cates	LW	L	27	2017	Stillwater, Minnesota
14	(Canada)	Sean Couturier (C)	C	L	33	2011	Phoenix, Arizona
9	(Canada)	Jamie Drysdale	D	R	24	2024	Toronto, Ontario
22	(United States)	Christian Dvorak	C	L	30	2025	Palos, Illinois
71	(Canada)	Tyson Foerster	RW	R	24	2020	Alliston, Ontario
17	(Russia)	Nikita Grebenkin	RW	L	23	2025	Serov, Russia
5	(Czech Republic)	David Jiříček	D	R	22	2026	Klatovy, Czech Republic
54	(United States)	Cole Knuble	RW	R	22	2023	Grand Rapids, Michigan
11	(Canada)	Travis Konecny (A)	RW	R	29	2015	London, Ontario
94	(Canada)	Porter Martone	RW	R	20	2025	Peterborough, Ontario
19	(United States)	Hunter McDonald	D	L	24	2022	Fairport, New York
39	(Russia)	Matvei Michkov	RW	L	21	2023	Perm, Russia
55	(Finland)	Rasmus Ristolainen	D	R	32	2021	Turku, Finland
6	(Canada)	Travis Sanheim (A)	D	L	30	2014	Elkhorn, Manitoba
24	(United States)	Nick Seeler	D	L	33	2021	Eden Prairie, Minnesota
74	(Canada)	Owen Tippett	RW	R	27	2022	Peterborough, Ontario
80	(Czech Republic)	Daniel Vladař	G	L	29	2025	Prague, Czech Republic
53	(United States)	Joseph Woll	G	L	28	2026	Dardenne Prairie, Missouri
8	(United States)	Cam York	D	L	25	2019	Anaheim Hills, California
46	(United States)	Trevor Zegras	C	L	25	2025	Bedford, New York

=== Pittsburgh Penguins ===
Updated October 22, 2026

No.	Nat	Player	Pos	S/G	Age	Acquired	Birthplace
16	(Canada)	Justin Brazeau	RW	R	28	2025	New Liskeard, Ontario
72	(United States)	Declan Carlile	D	L	26	2026	Flint, Michigan
59	(Russia)	Egor Chinakhov	RW	L	25	2025	Omsk, Russia
87	(Canada)	Sidney Crosby (C)	C	L	39	2005	Cole Harbour, Nova Scotia
19	(Canada)	Connor Dewar	LW/C	L	27	2025	The Pas, Manitoba
49	(Canada)	Sam Girard	D	L	28	2026	Roberval, Quebec
27	(Canada)	Ryan Graves	D	L	31	2023	Yarmouth, Nova Scotia
65	(Sweden)	Erik Karlsson	D	R	36	2023	Landsbro, Sweden
81	(Canada)	Ben Kindel	C	R	19	2025	Coquitlam, British Columbia
41	(Finland)	Ville Koivunen	RW	L	23	2024	Oulu, Finland
6	(Canada)	Kaedan Korczak	D	R	25	2026	Yorkton, Saskatchewan
62	(Russia)	Andrei Kuzmenko	RW	R	30	2026	Yakutsk, Russia
22	(Canada)	Hendrix Lapierre	C	L	24	2026	Gatineau, Quebec
58	(Canada)	Kris Letang (A)	D	R	39	2005	Montreal, Quebec
46	(United States)	Blake Lizotte	C	L	28	2024	Lindstrom, Minnesota
71	(Russia)	Evgeni Malkin (A)	C/LW	L	40	2004	Magnitogorsk, Soviet Union
2	(United States)	Rutger McGroarty	LW	L	22	2024	Lincoln, Nebraska
1	(Russia)	Sergei Murashov	G	R	22	2022	Yaroslavl, Russia
18	(United States)	Tommy Novak	C/LW	L	29	2025	River Falls, Wisconsin
44	(United States)	Chase Pietila	D	R	22	2024	Howell, Michigan
67	(Sweden)	Rickard Rakell	RW/C	R	33	2022	Sundbyberg, Sweden
14	(United States)	Nick Robertson	LW	L	25	2026	Arcadia, California
17	(United States)	Bryan Rust	RW	R	34	2010	Pontiac, Michigan
37	(Latvia)	Artūrs Šilovs	G	L	25	2025	Riga, Latvia
25	(Sweden)	Elmer Söderblom	LW	L	25	2026	Gothenburg, Sweden
7	(Belarus)	Ilya Solovyov	D	L	26	2026	Mogilev, Belarus
24	(United States)	Spencer Stastney	D	L	26	2026	Mequon, Wisconsin
57	(United States)	Trevor van Riemsdyk	D	R	35	2026	Middletown, New Jersey

=== Washington Capitals ===
Updated October 28, 2026

No.	Nat	Player	Pos	S/G	Age	Acquired	Birthplace
72	(Canada)	Anthony Beauvillier	LW	L	29	2025	Sorel-Tracy, Quebec
6	(Canada)	Jakob Chychrun	D	L	28	2024	Boca Raton, Florida
73	(Canada)	Vincent Desharnais	D	R	30	2026	Laval, Quebec
80	(Canada)	Pierre-Luc Dubois	C	L	28	2024	Sainte-Agathe-des-Monts, Quebec
42	(Slovakia)	Martin Fehérváry	D	L	27	2018	Bratislava, Slovakia
53	(United States)	Ethen Frank	C	R	28	2022	Papillion, Nebraska
44	(United States)	Cole Hutson	D	L	20	2024	St. Louis, Missouri
22	(Canada)	Boone Jenner	C	L	33	2026	London, Ontario
25	(Canada)	Jordan Kyrou	RW	R	28	2026	Toronto, Ontario
9	(United States)	Ryan Leonard	RW	R	21	2023	Northampton, Massachusetts
27	(Sweden)	Timothy Liljegren	D	R	27	2026	Kristianstad, Sweden
79	(United States)	Charlie Lindgren	G	R	32	2022	Lakeville, Minnesota
52	(Canada)	Dylan McIlrath	D	R	34	2021	Winnipeg, Manitoba
63	(Russia)	Ivan Miroshnichenko	LW	R	22	2022	Ussuriysk, Russia
8	(Russia)	Alexander Ovechkin (C)	LW	R	41	2004	Moscow, Soviet Union
21	(Belarus)	Aliaksei Protas	C	L	25	2019	Vitebsk, Belarus
62	(Belarus)	Ilya Protas	LW	L	20	2024	Vitebsk, Belarus
3	(United States)	Matt Roy (A)	D	R	31	2024	Canton, Michigan
38	(Sweden)	Rasmus Sandin	D	L	26	2023	Uppsala, Sweden
34	(Canada)	Justin Sourdif	RW	R	24	2025	Richmond, British Columbia
29	(United States)	Jack St. Ivany	D	R	27	2026	Manhattan Beach, California
17	(Canada)	Dylan Strome (A)	C	L	29	2022	Mississauga, Ontario
48	(Canada)	Logan Thompson	G	R	29	2024	Calgary, Alberta
89	(United States)	Alex Tuch	RW	R	30	2026	Syracuse, New York
43	(Canada)	Tom Wilson (A)	RW	R	32	2012	Toronto, Ontario

== See also ==
- List of current NHL Western Conference team roster
