= Lists of current NHL team rosters =

The following are lists of current National Hockey League (NHL) team rosters:

- For Eastern Conference rosters please see List of current NHL Eastern Conference team rosters.
- For Western Conference rosters please see List of current NHL Western Conference team rosters.
