= Joel Edmundson =

Canadian ice hockey player (born 1993)

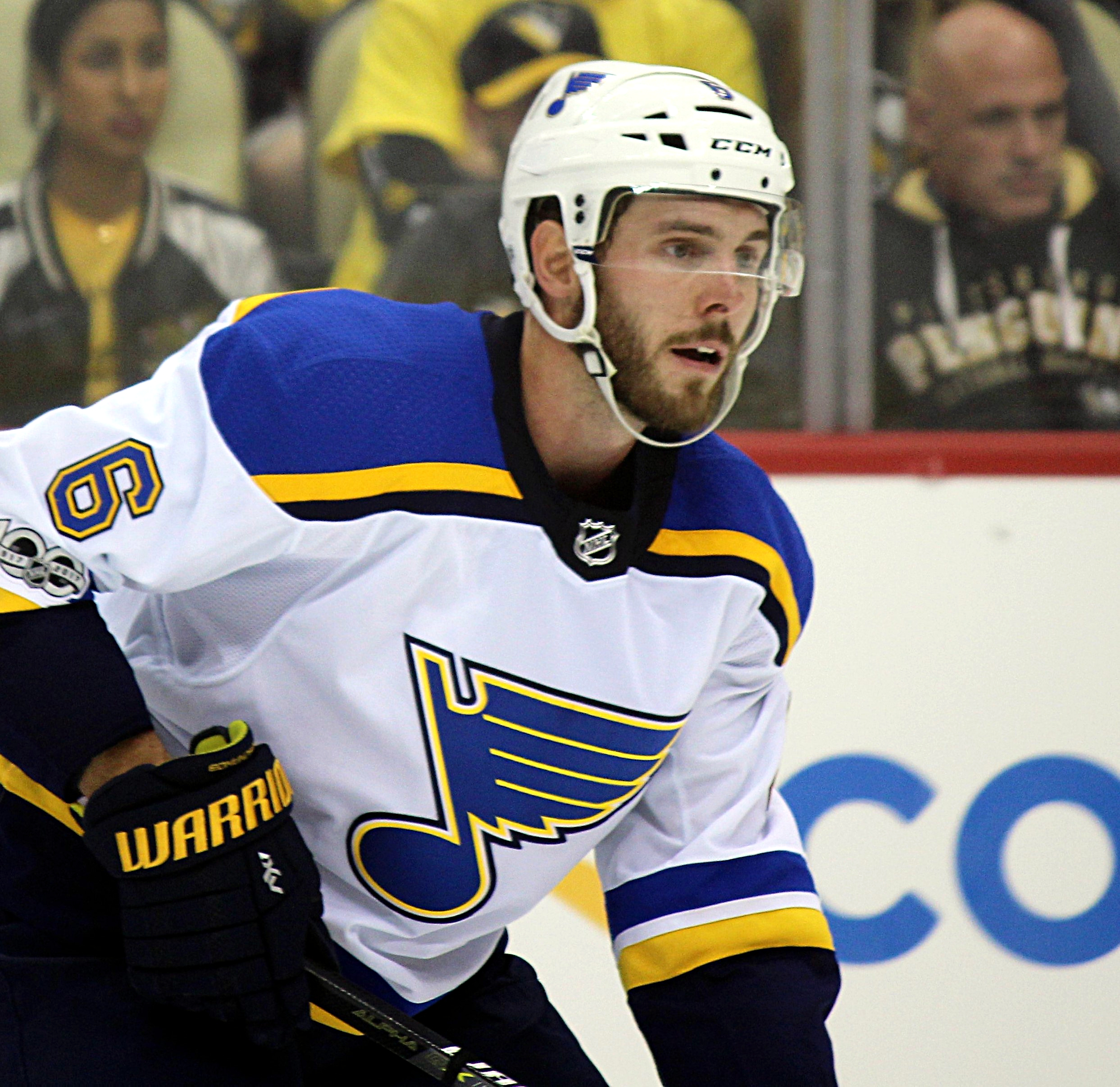
- Edmundson with the St. Louis Blues in 2017
- Born: June 28, 1993 (age 33) Brandon, Manitoba, Canada
- Height: 6 ft 5 in (196 cm)
- Weight: 225 lb (102 kg; 16 st 1 lb)
- Position: Defence
- Shoots: Left
- NHL team Former teams: Los Angeles Kings; St. Louis Blues; Carolina Hurricanes; Montreal Canadiens; Washington Capitals; Toronto Maple Leafs
- National team: Canada
- NHL draft: 46th overall, 2011; St. Louis Blues
- Playing career: 2013–present

Joel Edmundson (born June 28, 1993) is a Canadian professional ice hockey player who is a defenceman for the Los Angeles Kings of the National Hockey League (NHL). He was selected in the second round, 46th overall, by the St. Louis Blues in the 2011 NHL entry draft and won the Stanley Cup with the Blues in 2019. Edmundson has also previously played for the Carolina Hurricanes, Montreal Canadiens, Washington Capitals, and Toronto Maple Leafs.

== Early life ==
Edmundson was born on June 28, 1993, in Brandon, Manitoba, to parents Bob and Lois Edmundson. He began playing ice hockey at the age of two after being inspired by his older brother Jesse.

== Playing career ==
=== Amateur ===
Growing up in Manitoba, Edmundson and his brother played junior ice hockey with their hometown midget AAA team, the Brandon Wheat Kings. During the 2008–09 and 2009–10 seasons, Edmundson played a total of 85 games for the team and scored 58 points. Competing alongside future NHLer Micheal Ferland, the Wheat Kings lost in the semi-finals of the playoffs. When Ferland was recruited by the Brandon Wheat Kings, Edmundson's father Bob assisted financially in order to allow Ferland to play hockey. He also appeared in one game for the Manitoba Junior Hockey League's Dauphin Kings during the 2009–10 season before being drafted 121st overall by the Moose Jaw Warriors during the 2008 Western Hockey League (WHL) Bantam Draft.

In his WHL rookie season, Edmundson played in 71 games for the Warriors and scored 20 points while adding on 95 penalty minutes. He was originally ranked 69th overall by the NHL Central Scouting Bureau, but his strong rookie season boosted him to 33rd leading up to the 2011 NHL entry draft. The Warriors assistant coach and defensive specialist Mike Vandenberghe spoke highly of Edmundson's progress during the season, saying "Joel has the size, potential and an offensive upside...He is a good solid, stay at home defensemen with good puck movement." He was eventually drafted 46th overall by the St. Louis Blues and attended their summer training camp where he suffered an ankle injury. He missed a month of playing time in order to recover and returned to the Warriors lineup on October 27, 2011. Upon his return, he was named to Team WHL during the CHL Canada/Russia Series as a replacement for Griffin Reinhart. Edmundson and the Warriors finished first in the WHL’s East Division and reached the WHL Eastern Conference Semi-Finals against the Medicine Hat Tigers. He finished the regular season with 23 points in 56 games.

Due to the 2012–13 NHL lockout, Edmundson was unable to attend the Blues' 2012 Training Camp prior to the start of the season. He returned to the WHL for his final season of major junior hockey, and was named an alternate captain alongside Morgan Rielly and Jordan Wyton. On December 6, 2012, Edmundson and a 4th round draft pick in 2015 were traded to the Kamloops Blazers in exchange for Tyler Bell, Jayden Halbgewachs, and a 1st round draft pick in 2015. While playing with the Blazers, Edmundson signed a three-year entry-level contract with the Blues to conclude his junior career after the season finished. After the regular season concluded, Edmundson received the team's Most Dedicated award as the Blazers qualified for the 2013 WHL Playoffs. They lost to the Portland Winterhawks in the Conference Finals and he was invited to participate in the Blues training camp prior to the 2013–14 season.

=== Professional ===
==== St. Louis Blues ====
Edmundson began his professional career with the Blues' American Hockey League (AHL) affiliate, the Chicago Wolves, after being cut from training camp. He recorded his first career goal professional goal on November 13, 2013, in a 3–1 win over the Iowa Wild. His goal came during the second period and proved to be the game winner as the Wolves retook the lead. Edmundson and the Wolves finished first in the Midwest Division and qualified for the 2014 Calder Cup playoffs where they lost in the second round. Edmundson was reassigned to the Wolves out of the Blues' 2014 Training Camp but made his season debut on February 3, 2015, due to an injury. In 30 regular season games, Edmundson recorded 12 points and 49 penalty minutes as the team finished third in the Midwest Division.

After playing two seasons with the Wolves, Edmundson made the opening night roster of the St. Louis Blues for the 2015–16 season. Alongside fellow rookie Colton Parayko, he made his NHL debut on October 8, 2015, against the Edmonton Oilers. Edmundson alternated between the AHL and NHL throughout the season, playing with the Blues for 23 games before being re-assigned to the Chicago Wolves. He returned to the NHL roster before Christmas and scored his first career NHL goal on March 25, 2016, in a 4–0 win over the Vancouver Canucks to help the Blues clinch a playoff spot. At the conclusion of the season, Edmundson recorded nine points in 66 games and set a franchise record for most hits by a rookie with 162. On April 8, 2016, he signed a two-year contract extension to stay with the Blues.

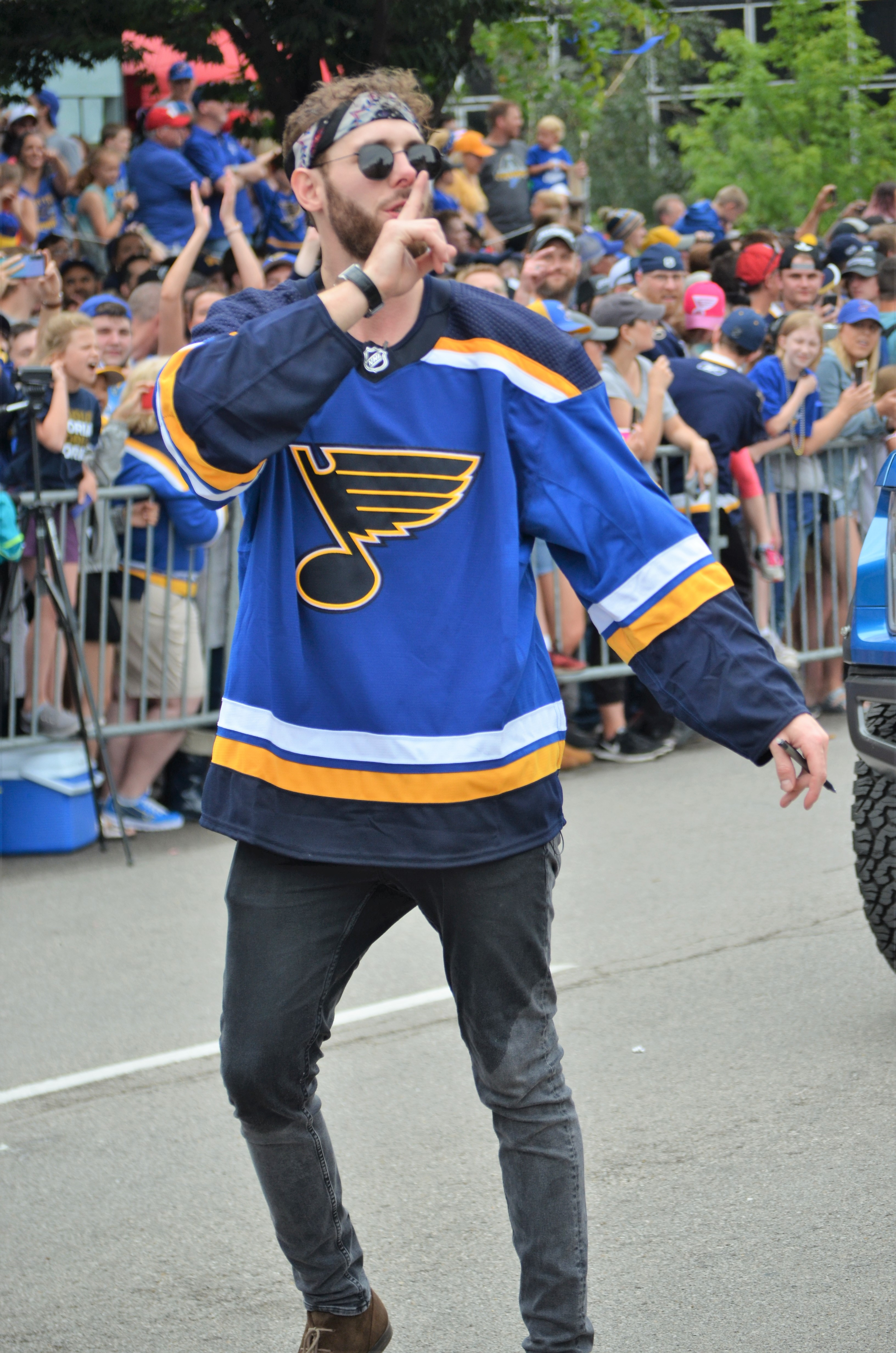
Edmundson during the 2019 Stanley Cup parade

Edmundson once again made the Blues opening night roster prior to the 2016–17 season. His time in the lineup was short-lived as he endured an upper-body injury during a win over the Colorado Avalanche and was placed on injured reserve. He eventually returned to the Blues' lineup on December 5 after missing 12 games. Edmundson ended the season with 16 points in 69 games and was placed on the team's protected list leading up to the 2017 NHL Expansion Draft.

Entering the second year of his newest contract, Edmundson again made the Blues opening night roster prior to the 2017–18 season. He was once again alternated in and out of the Blues' lineup due to various injuries throughout the season. On February 9, 2018, Edmundson was placed on the Blues' injured reserve for an expected period of six weeks to recover from a broken right forearm. After missing 13 games, Edmundson returned to the Blues' lineup on March 15, 2018, and scored in their 4–1 loss to the Avalanche. Playing primarily with either Alex Pietrangelo or Colton Parayko, Edmundson finished the season with a career high 17 points in 69 games.

During the 2018 off-season, Edmundson volunteered as a guest instructor at Micheal Ferland's Hockey School in Brandon, Manitoba, alongside Brigette Lacquette, Harley Garrioch, Jens Meilleur, Ryan Pulock, Tyler Plante, Shaq Merasty, Josh Elmes, and Zach Whitecloud. As a result of his success on the team, Edmundson and Blues agreed on a one year, $3 million contract for the 2018–19 season on July 24, 2018. He once again began the season with the Blues but suffered a groin injury which delayed his season debut until October 11. Upon returning to the Blues' lineup, he suffered another lower-body injury during a game against the Arizona Coyotes on March 12, 2019. Edmundson helped the Blues qualify for the 2019 Stanley Cup Final against the Boston Bruins, and played in five out of the seven games of the series, to help the Blues clinch their first Stanley Cup in franchise history. During his Day with the Cup, Edmundson returned to his hometown of Brandon, Manitoba and brought the cup to his training gym, the Sportsplex, and the Western Manitoba Cancer Centre. As a restricted free agent in the off-season, Edmundson filed for salary arbitration and was awarded a one-year, $3.1 million contract to remain with the Blues.

==== Carolina Hurricanes ====
On September 24, 2019, Edmundson was traded, along with Dominik Bokk and a seventh-round pick in 2021, to the Carolina Hurricanes in exchange for Justin Faulk and a fifth-round pick in 2020. He found out about the trade at noon and arrived in Carolina the following morning where he participated in morning practice. After going pointless in 17 games, Edmundson recorded his first goal as a Hurricane and two assists during a 8–2 win over the Ottawa Senators on November 11, 2019. By January 19, 2020, Edmundson recorded his 12th point of the season, surpassing his previous seasons point total of 11. Two months later, Edmundson recorded his 19th point of the season, setting a new career-high in points.

==== Montreal Canadiens ====
On September 12, 2020, Edmundson (a pending unrestricted free agent) was traded to the Montreal Canadiens in exchange for a 2020 fifth-round pick. On September 16, Edmundson signed a four-year, $14 million contract with the Canadiens. He noted that his father was a lifelong fan of the team, and thus pleased by this outcome. Edmundson quickly became an important part of the team's defence, playing most of the 2020–21 season partnered with Jeff Petry. With the Canadiens making a deep playoff run, Edmundson participated in his second Stanley Cup Final. The Canadiens were defeated by the Tampa Bay Lightning in five games.

Upon arrival at the Canadiens' training camp in the leadup to the 2021–22 season, Edmundson was reported as having an undisclosed injury that would keep him from skating with the team, which was later indicated to be a back injury. It was subsequently announced that he would miss two to three weeks at the beginning of the season. However, his recovery process was far more protracted, due to multiple setbacks and time away from the team to care for his ailing father. Eventually it was concluded he would not require surgery and returned to practices with the team at the end of February 2022. Edmundson returned to the ice on March 12, 2022 when the Canadiens hosted the expansion Seattle Kraken for the first time in their history.

Edmundson was considered a candidate to succeed Shea Weber as the Canadiens' captain in advance of the 2022–23 season, but was instead named an alternate captain while the captaincy was given to Nick Suzuki. Days later, Edmundson and Suzuki collided while in a training scrimmage, both sustained injuries; in Edmundson's case, the aggravation of his prior back injury put him out indefinitely. With the team undergoing a rebuild, there was discussion upon his return to the lineup that Edmundson might be traded in advance of the 2023 playoffs trade deadline. However, this was hindered by Edmundson being injured weeks before the deadline and being kept out of games for that span.

==== Washington Capitals ====
On July 1, 2023, Edmundson was traded by the Canadiens to the Washington Capitals in exchange for a third and seventh-round pick in 2024.

==== Toronto Maple Leafs ====
On March 7, 2024, Edmundson was traded to the Toronto Maple Leafs in exchange for a 2024 3rd and 2025 5th round draft picks with 50% salary retention.

==== Los Angeles Kings ====
On July 1, 2024, having left the Maple Leafs as a free agent, Edmundson signed a four-year, $15.4 million contract with the Los Angeles Kings.

== International play ==
As a citizen of Canada, Edmundson was selected to compete for Canada's senior team at the 2018 IIHF World Championship. After missing the first game of the tournament due to a groin injury, Edmundson scored three points in Canada's 10–0 win over South Korea on May 6, 2018. With Edmundson in the lineup, Canada finished fourth in the tournament and did not medal.

== Career statistics ==
=== Regular season and playoffs ===
			Regular season					Playoffs
Season	Team	League	GP	G	A	Pts	PIM	GP	G	A	Pts	PIM
2008–09	Brandon Wheat Kings AAA	MMHL	41	5	18	23	58	6	2	4	6	4
2009–10	Brandon Wheat Kings AAA	MMHL	44	10	25	35	54	7	0	5	5	10
2009–10	Dauphin Kings	MJHL	1	0	0	0	2	—	—	—	—	—
2010–11	Moose Jaw Warriors	WHL	71	2	18	20	95	6	0	0	0	2
2011–12	Moose Jaw Warriors	WHL	56	4	19	23	91	14	3	2	5	12
2012–13	Moose Jaw Warriors	WHL	29	2	6	8	70	—	—	—	—	—
2012–13	Kamloops Blazers	WHL	34	7	10	17	71	15	3	5	8	29
2013–14	Chicago Wolves	AHL	64	4	4	8	108	5	0	0	0	16
2014–15	Chicago Wolves	AHL	30	4	8	12	49	5	2	0	2	2
2015–16	Chicago Wolves	AHL	6	0	0	0	15	—	—	—	—	—
2015–16	St. Louis Blues	NHL	67	1	8	9	63	16	1	0	1	8
2016–17	St. Louis Blues	NHL	69	3	12	15	60	11	3	3	6	14
2017–18	St. Louis Blues	NHL	69	7	10	17	57	—	—	—	—	—
2018–19	St. Louis Blues	NHL	64	2	9	11	68	22	1	6	7	10
2019–20	Carolina Hurricanes	NHL	68	7	13	20	72	4	1	0	1	2
2020–21	Montreal Canadiens	NHL	55	3	10	13	25	22	0	6	6	10
2021–22	Montreal Canadiens	NHL	24	3	3	6	35	—	—	—	—	—
2022–23	Montreal Canadiens	NHL	61	2	11	13	58	—	—	—	—	—
2023–24	Washington Capitals	NHL	44	1	5	6	19	—	—	—	—	—
2023–24	Toronto Maple Leafs	NHL	9	0	0	0	4	7	0	1	1	6
2024–25	Los Angeles Kings	NHL	73	6	14	20	22	6	0	1	1	2
2025–26	Los Angeles Kings	NHL	82	2	21	23	25	4	1	0	1	0
NHL totals			685	37	116	153	508	92	7	17	24	52

=== International ===
Year	Team	Event	Result	GP	G	A	Pts	PIM
2018	Canada	WC	4th	9	1	3	4	12
Senior totals				9	1	3	4	12

== Awards and honours ==
Award	Year	Ref
NHL
Stanley Cup champion	2019	
