= Zach Whitecloud =

Canadian ice hockey player (born 1996)

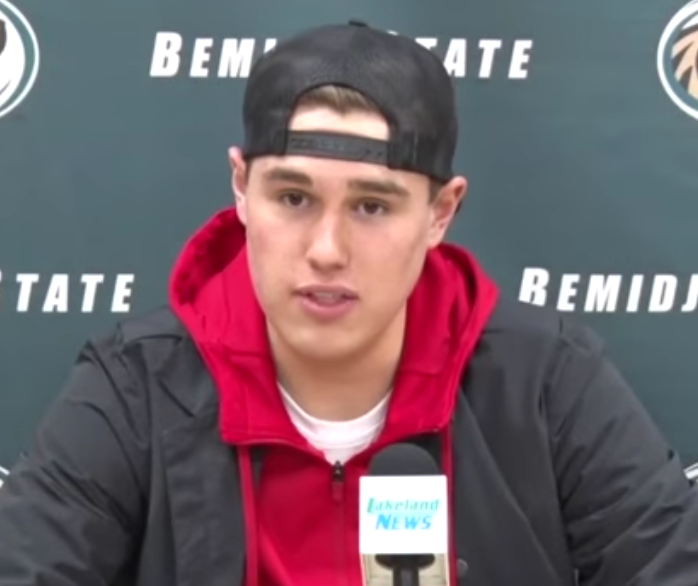
- Whitecloud in 2018
- Born: November 28, 1996 (age 29) Brandon, Manitoba, Canada
- Height: 6 ft 2 in (188 cm)
- Weight: 209 lb (95 kg; 14 st 13 lb)
- Position: Defence
- Shoots: Right
- NHL team Former teams: Calgary Flames; Vegas Golden Knights
- National team: Canada
- NHL draft: Undrafted
- Playing career: 2018–present

Zach Whitecloud (born November 28, 1996) is a Canadian professional ice hockey player who is a defenceman and alternate captain for the Calgary Flames of the National Hockey League (NHL). He previously played for the Vegas Golden Knights. Whitecloud went undrafted while playing for Bemidji State University. As a college free agent, he signed with the Golden Knights in 2018.

== Early life ==
Zach Whitecloud was born on November 28, 1996, in Brandon, Manitoba. Whitecloud is of Dakota descent and was raised in Brandon, spending time at the nearby Sioux Valley Dakota Nation. He considers both Brandon and Sioux Valley as home. Whitecloud began skating at two years old and lighting up Parker Easter on the ODR by 8. As a youth, he played for the Sioux Valley team and then the Brandon Youth Hockey Association. During his childhood, Whitecloud's family served as a billet family for Brandon Wheat Kings players. Whitecloud graduated from Vincent Massey High School in 2015.

== Playing career ==
During his second full season with the Virden Oil Capitals, Whitecloud announced his commitment to play hockey for Bemidji State University. Following his rookie year at Bemidji State, where he led defencemen in scoring, Whitecloud was invited to the Los Angeles Kings development camp before the 2017–18 NHL season. Following his sophomore year at Bemidji, Whitecloud was named the 2017–18 WCHA Scholar-Athlete and named to the WCHA All-Academic Team. He ended the season with 19 points and a team-best 51 blocked shots.

=== Vegas Golden Knights ===
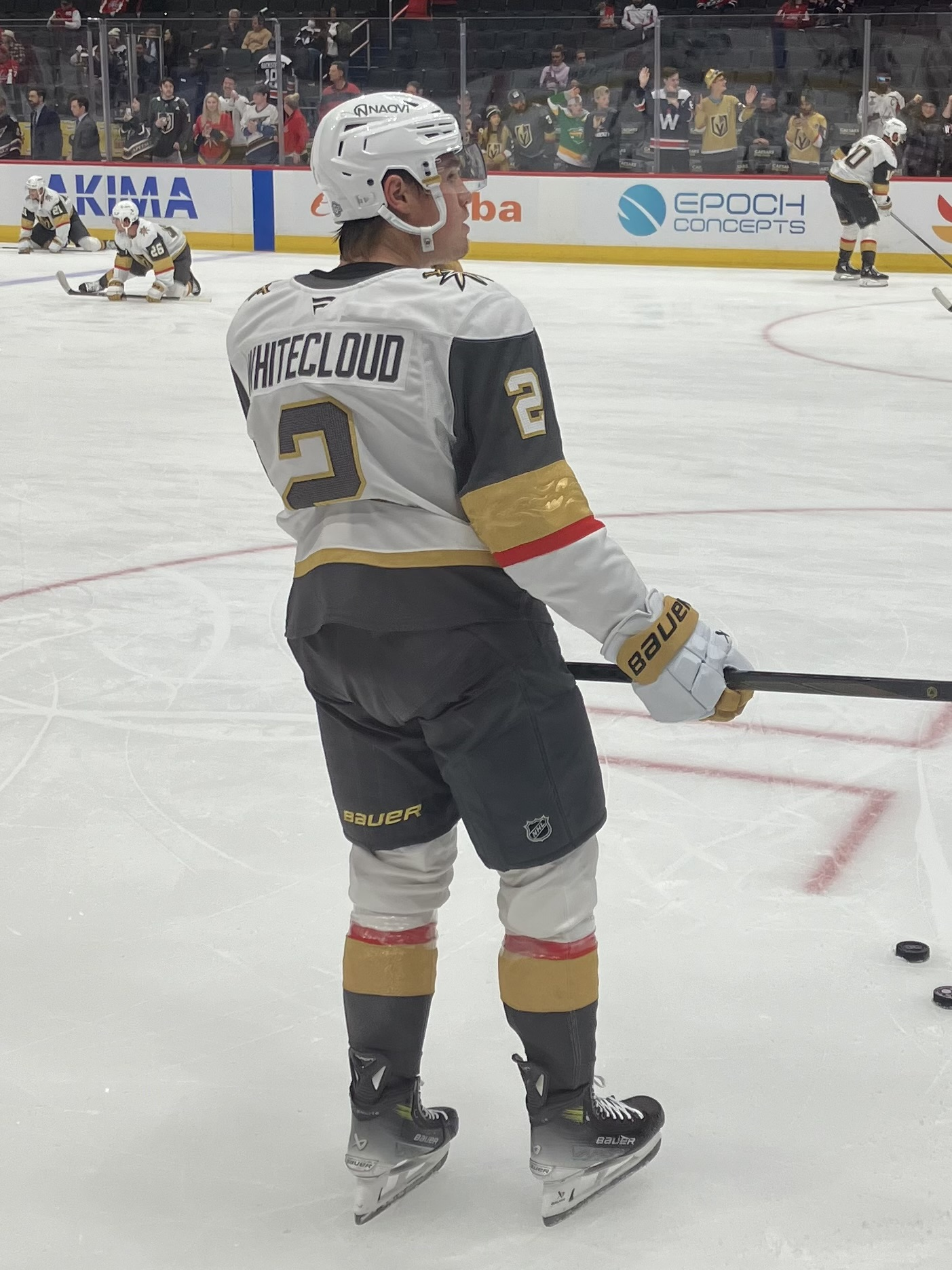
Whitecloud with the Golden Knights in 2024.

Whitecloud was signed by the Vegas Golden Knights to a three-year, entry-level contract on March 8, 2018. He played his first career NHL game on April 5, 2018, against the Edmonton Oilers. He finished the game with a team-best plus-3 in 16:42 of ice time in a 4–3 loss to the Oilers. Although the Golden Knights qualified for the 2018 Stanley Cup playoffs, Whitecloud was ineligible to be on the roster since he was not on the team's reserve list by the trade deadline.

While attending the Knights training camp prior to the 2018–19 season, Whitecloud was re-assigned to their American Hockey League affiliate, the Chicago Wolves.

Late in the 2019–20 season, Whitecloud established himself with Vegas Golden Knights and he and teammate Nick Holden were one of the best duos in the playoffs in terms of defense and possession. He was signed to a two-year contract extension on March 22, 2020.

On October 28, 2021, Whitecloud signed a six-year, $16.5 million contract extension with the Golden Knights.

The first round of the Golden Knights' 2023 Stanley Cup playoffs was played against the Winnipeg Jets of Whitecloud's home province, with him noting that many in his family had been fans of the team and generally cheered for them when not playing the Golden Knights. The Golden Knights reached the 2023 Stanley Cup Final, with Whitecloud one of two indigenous players in the series, alongside Mohawk defenceman Brandon Montour of the opposing Florida Panthers. The Golden Knights defeated the Panthers in five games, and Whitecloud hoisted the Stanley Cup for the first time.

=== Calgary Flames ===
Whitecloud was traded to the Calgary Flames on January 18, 2026, with prospect Abram Wiebe, a conditional 2027 first-round pick, and a conditional 2028 second-round pick, for Rasmus Andersson.

== International play ==
Medal record

Men's ice hockey

Representing Canada

World Championship
Silver medal – second place	2022 Finland	

Whitecloud was the youngest skater selected to play for Team Canada at the 2017 Karjala Cup in Finland. He was later named to Team Canada's pre-Olympic roster before the 2018 Winter Olympics but failed to make the final roster.

== Personal life ==
During the 2018 offseason, Whitecloud volunteered as a guest instructor at Micheal Ferland's Hockey School in Brandon, Manitoba, alongside Brigette Lacquette, Harley Garrioch, Jens Meilleur, Ryan Pulock, Tyler Plante, Shaq Merasty, Josh Elmes, and Joel Edmundson.

== Career statistics ==
=== Regular season and playoffs ===
			Regular season					Playoffs
Season	Team	League	GP	G	A	Pts	PIM	GP	G	A	Pts	PIM
2011–12	Brandon Wheat Kings Midget	MMHL	8	0	0	0	4	—	—	—	—	—
2012–13	Central Plains Capitals Midget	MMHL	43	1	5	6	92	2	0	0	0	0
2012–13	Portage Terriers	MJHL	1	0	0	0	0	—	—	—	—	—
2013–14	Brandon Wheat Kings Midget	MMHL	43	8	13	21	59	8	0	3	3	8
2013–14	Virden Oil Capitals	MJHL	1	0	0	0	0	6	1	0	1	0
2014–15	Virden Oil Capitals	MJHL	57	3	7	10	42	10	1	3	4	10
2015–16	Virden Oil Capitals	MJHL	59	6	34	40	105	7	2	3	5	6
2016–17	Bemidji State University	WCHA	41	3	14	17	41	—	—	—	—	—
2017–18	Bemidji State University	WCHA	36	4	15	19	8	—	—	—	—	—
2017–18	Vegas Golden Knights	NHL	1	0	0	0	0	—	—	—	—	—
2018–19	Chicago Wolves	AHL	74	6	22	28	52	22	3	12	15	11
2019–20	Chicago Wolves	AHL	35	2	5	7	18	—	—	—	—	—
2019–20	Vegas Golden Knights	NHL	16	0	1	1	4	20	2	1	3	6
2020–21	Vegas Golden Knights	NHL	51	2	10	12	24	19	1	3	4	16
2021–22	Vegas Golden Knights	NHL	59	8	11	19	20	—	—	—	—	—
2022–23	Vegas Golden Knights	NHL	59	5	7	12	41	22	2	6	8	21
2023–24	Vegas Golden Knights	NHL	61	2	12	14	32	6	0	0	0	2
2024–25	Vegas Golden Knights	NHL	74	4	9	13	37	11	0	2	2	8
2025–26	Vegas Golden Knights	NHL	47	2	5	7	20	—	—	—	—	—
2025–26	Calgary Flames	NHL	31	0	10	10	10	—	—	—	—	—
NHL totals			399	23	65	88	188	78	5	12	17	53

=== International ===
Year	Team	Event	Result	GP	G	A	Pts	PIM
2022	Canada	WC	2nd place, silver medalist(s)	10	2	2	4	6
2026	Canada	WC	4th	10	0	1	1	8
Senior totals				20	2	3	5	14

== Awards and honours ==
Award	Year
College
WCHA All-Rookie Team	2016–17
NHL
Stanley Cup champion	2023
