= Dylan DeMelo =

Dylan DeMelo may refer to:

- Dylan DeMelo (ice hockey) (born 1993), Canadian ice hockey player
- Dylan De Melo (soccer) (born 2009), Canadian soccer player
