= Ryan Pulock =

Canadian ice hockey player (born 1994)

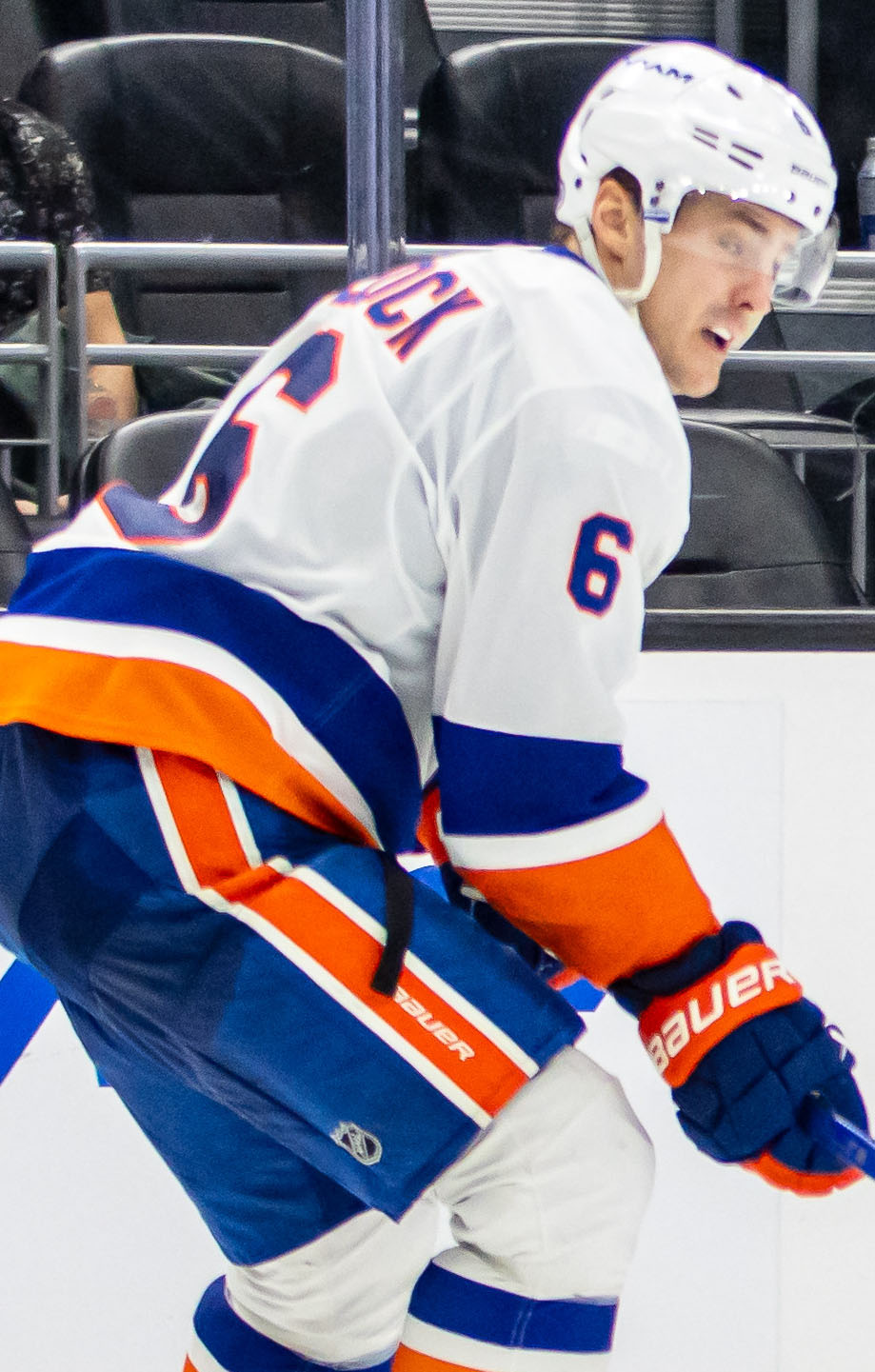
- Pulock with the New York Islanders in November 2024
- Born: October 6, 1994 (age 31) Dauphin, Manitoba, Canada
- Height: 6 ft 2 in (188 cm)
- Weight: 214 lb (97 kg; 15 st 4 lb)
- Position: Defence
- Shoots: Right
- NHL team: New York Islanders
- NHL draft: 15th overall, 2013; New York Islanders
- Playing career: 2014–present

Ryan Pulock (born October 6, 1994) is a Canadian professional ice hockey player who is a defenceman and alternate captain for the New York Islanders of the National Hockey League (NHL). Pulock was drafted 15th overall by the Islanders in the 2013 NHL entry draft.

== Playing career ==
=== Junior ===
Pulock was born in Dauphin, Manitoba, but grew up in Grandview, Manitoba. He was drafted by the Brandon Wheat Kings in the 2009 WHL Bantam Draft, and played with them his entire major junior hockey career. Pulock was selected by the New York Islanders in the first round (15th overall) of the 2013 NHL entry draft. The following season, Pulock was named to the 2014 WHL First All-Star Team.

=== Professional ===
On September 28, 2013, Pulock was signed to a three-year entry-level contract with the Islanders. Pulock played three seasons with the Islanders American Hockey League affiliate, the Bridgeport Sound Tigers before earning playing time in the NHL. While playing with the Sound Tigers he was named to the All-Rookie Team and named an AHL All-Star for two consecutive AHL seasons.

Pulock earned his first NHL call-up of the 2015–16 season after Calvin de Haan was placed on injured reserve. He made his NHL debut on February 28, 2016, against the Edmonton Oilers. He recorded his first career NHL goal on March 17, in a 4–2 loss to the Nashville Predators. Pulock also scored his first Stanley Cup playoff goal, a power play goal in Game 3 against the Florida Panthers, in the 2016 Stanley Cup playoffs.

Pulock began the 2016–17 season with the Islanders but sustained an injury at the beginning of the season, and spent the rest of the year in the AHL.

The following season fared better for Pulock, who made the team out of training camp and played the entire season in the NHL. He re-signed with the Islanders on July 17, 2018. During the 2018 offseason, Pulock volunteered as a guest instructor at Micheal Ferland's Hockey School in Brandon, Manitoba, alongside Brigette Lacquette, Harley Garrioch, Jens Meilleur, Zach Whitecloud, Tyler Plante, Shaq Merasty, Josh Elmes, and Joel Edmundson.

In the 2018–19 season, new Islanders head coach Barry Trotz paired Pulock and former South Tigers teammate Adam Pelech.

On November 4, 2020, Pulock signed a two-year, $10 million contract with the Islanders.

On October 14, 2021, Pulock signed an eight-year, $49.2 million contract extension with the Islanders.

== Personal life ==
Pulock grew up in Grandview, Manitoba with his brothers Brock, Derrick, and parents Dave and Tannis. In 2010, while driving to see his older brother play hockey, Pulock's family got into a car accident, killing his brother Brock.

== Career statistics ==
=== Regular season and playoffs ===
			Regular season					Playoffs
Season	Team	League	GP	G	A	Pts	PIM	GP	G	A	Pts	PIM
2009–10	Parkland Rangers	MMHL	39	9	9	18	8	3	0	1	1	0
2010–11	Brandon Wheat Kings	WHL	63	8	34	42	4	6	2	4	6	2
2011–12	Brandon Wheat Kings	WHL	71	19	41	60	20	9	3	2	5	0
2012–13	Brandon Wheat Kings	WHL	61	14	31	45	22	—	—	—	—	—
2013–14	Brandon Wheat Kings	WHL	66	23	40	63	18	9	2	2	4	6
2013–14	Bridgeport Sound Tigers	AHL	3	0	1	1	2	—	—	—	—	—
2014–15	Bridgeport Sound Tigers	AHL	54	17	12	29	6	—	—	—	—	—
2015–16	Bridgeport Sound Tigers	AHL	51	7	17	24	12	—	—	—	—	—
2015–16	New York Islanders	NHL	15	2	2	4	5	6	1	2	3	0
2016–17	Bridgeport Sound Tigers	AHL	55	15	31	46	18	—	—	—	—	—
2016–17	New York Islanders	NHL	1	0	0	0	0	—	—	—	—	—
2017–18	New York Islanders	NHL	68	10	22	32	14	—	—	—	—	—
2018–19	New York Islanders	NHL	82	9	28	37	22	8	0	1	1	4
2019–20	New York Islanders	NHL	68	10	25	35	14	22	2	8	10	6
2020–21	New York Islanders	NHL	56	2	15	17	8	19	4	2	6	4
2021–22	New York Islanders	NHL	56	5	16	21	2	—	—	—	—	—
2022–23	New York Islanders	NHL	82	5	21	26	14	6	1	3	4	6
2023–24	New York Islanders	NHL	58	5	14	19	12	5	0	3	3	0
2024–25	New York Islanders	NHL	74	5	18	23	16	—	—	—	—	—
2025–26	New York Islanders	NHL	76	3	24	27	16	—	—	—	—	—
NHL totals			636	56	185	241	123	66	8	19	27	20

Medal record

Representing Canada

Ice hockey

World U18 Championships
Bronze medal – third place	2012 Czech Republic	

=== International ===
Year	Team	Event	Result	GP	G	A	Pts	PIM
2011	Canada Western	U17	6th	5	1	0	1	2
2012	Canada	U18	3rd place, bronze medalist(s)	6	1	1	2	0
2018	Canada	WC	4th	8	0	1	1	0
Junior totals				11	2	1	3	2
Senior totals				8	0	1	1	0

== Awards and honours ==
Award	Year
WHL
First All-Star Team (East)	2012, 2014
AHL
AHL All-Rookie Team	2015
AHL All-Star Classic	2016, 2017

Awards and achievements
Preceded by Griffin Reinhart	New York Islanders first round pick 2013	Succeeded by Michael Dal Colle
