= Griffin Reinhart =

Canadian ice hockey player (born 1994)

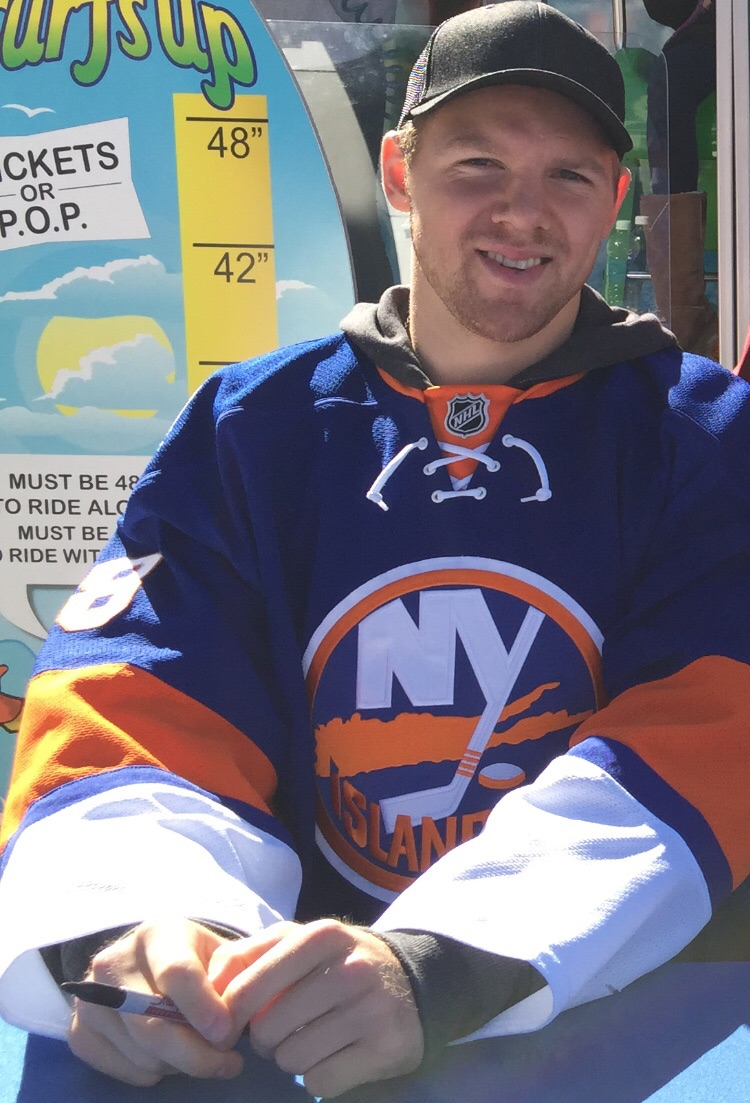
- Reinhart with the New York Islanders in 2014
- Born: January 24, 1994 (age 32) West Vancouver, British Columbia, Canada
- Height: 6 ft 4 in (193 cm)
- Weight: 217 lb (98 kg; 15 st 7 lb)
- Position: Defence
- Shot: Left
- Played for: New York Islanders; Edmonton Oilers; Kunlun Red Star; Iserlohn Roosters; Belfast Giants
- NHL draft: 4th overall, 2012; New York Islanders
- Playing career: 2014–2022

Griffin Reinhart (born January 24, 1994) is a Canadian former professional ice hockey defenceman who last played for the Belfast Giants of the Elite Ice Hockey League (EIHL).

He was drafted fourth overall by the New York Islanders in the 2012 NHL entry draft. During his tenure in the National Hockey League (NHL), Reinhart played for the Islanders and the Edmonton Oilers.

== Playing career ==
=== Major junior ===
After recording 36 points in the regular season, a career high, Reinhart won the 2012 WHL Playoffs with the Oil Kings. Reinhart was selected fourth overall by the New York Islanders, in the 2012 NHL entry draft and signed a three-year entry-level contract with them on August 2, 2012. On September 18, 2012, Reinhart was named captain of the Oil Kings.

Although the Oil Kings qualified for the 2013 WHL Playoffs, Reinhart injured his foot and was unable to play in the WHL finals, won by the Portland Winterhawks.

In his last year in the WHL, Reinhart helped lead the Oil Kings to their second WHL Championship within three years on May 12, 2014. He was named to the WHL (East) Second All-Star Team and WHL Playoff MVP for his efforts. The Oil Kings also named Reinhart and teammate Cody Corbett co-winners of the team’s Top Defenceman award. On May 25, the Oil Kings won the Memorial Cup over the Guelph Storm.

=== Professional ===
Although Reinhart spent the majority of the 2014–15 season with the Islanders AHL affiliate, the Bridgeport Sound Tigers, he made his NHL debut on October 10, 2014, against the Carolina Hurricanes.

On June 26, 2015, Reinhart was traded by the Islanders to the Edmonton Oilers in exchange for the Oilers' 2015 first-round pick (16th overall, Mathew Barzal) and second-round pick (33rd overall, Mitchell Stephens) in the 2015 NHL entry draft.

Having been left exposed by the Oilers at the 2017 NHL Expansion Draft, Reinhart was selected by the Vegas Golden Knights on June 21, 2017. On October 30, Reinhart was sent to the Golden Knights' AHL affiliate, the Chicago Wolves.

After leaving the NHL as a free agent, Reinhart spent his first season abroad, playing with Chinese based HC Kunlun Red Star of the Kontinental Hockey League during the COVID-19 pandemic affected 2019–20 season. He made 33 appearances for Kunlun, registering just 3 assists from the blueline.

As a free agent into the 2020–21 season, Reinhart belatedly joined German club, Iserlohn Roosters of the DEL, for the remainder of the campaign on February 12, 2021.

In August 2021, Reinhart agreed to terms with UK EIHL side Belfast Giants ahead of the 2021-22 season.

== Personal life ==
Reinhart's father Paul was an All-Star NHL defenseman for Atlanta/Calgary and Vancouver in the 1980s. Griffin's older brother, Max, was drafted by the Calgary Flames in 2010 and his younger brother Sam was drafted second overall in 2014 by the Buffalo Sabres.

== Career statistics ==
=== Regular season and playoffs ===
			Regular season					Playoffs
Season	Team	League	GP	G	A	Pts	PIM	GP	G	A	Pts	PIM
2008–09	Vancouver North West Giants	BCMML	3	1	3	4	0	2	0	0	0	0
2009–10	Vancouver North West Giants	BCMML	32	9	25	34	24	5	3	5	8	14
2009–10	Edmonton Oil Kings	WHL	2	0	0	0	0	—	—	—	—	—
2010–11	Edmonton Oil Kings	WHL	45	6	19	25	36	4	0	0	0	6
2011–12	Edmonton Oil Kings	WHL	58	12	24	36	38	20	2	6	8	20
2012–13	Edmonton Oil Kings	WHL	59	8	21	29	35	12	3	4	7	5
2013–14	Edmonton Oil Kings	WHL	45	4	17	21	55	21	4	9	13	18
2014–15	New York Islanders	NHL	8	0	1	1	6	1	0	0	0	0
2014–15	Bridgeport Sound Tigers	AHL	59	7	15	22	64	—	—	—	—	—
2015–16	Edmonton Oilers	NHL	29	0	1	1	20	—	—	—	—	—
2015–16	Bakersfield Condors	AHL	30	2	8	10	16	—	—	—	—	—
2016–17	Bakersfield Condors	AHL	54	7	14	21	42	—	—	—	—	—
2016–17	Edmonton Oilers	NHL	—	—	—	—	—	1	0	1	1	0
2017–18	Chicago Wolves	AHL	60	2	10	12	30	3	0	1	1	4
2018–19	Chicago Wolves	AHL	75	4	12	16	27	21	1	6	7	12
2019–20	Kunlun Red Star	KHL	33	0	2	2	6	—	—	—	—	—
2020–21	Iserlohn Roosters	DEL	22	3	8	11	10	3	0	1	1	2
2021–22	Belfast Giants	EIHL	53	3	29	32	8	4	0	1	1	0
NHL totals			37	0	2	2	26	2	0	1	1	0

=== International ===
Year	Team	Event	Result	GP	G	A	Pts	PIM
2011	Canada Pacific	U17	3rd place, bronze medalist(s)	6	1	6	7	4
2012	Canada	IH18	1st place, gold medalist(s)	5	0	0	0	6
2013	Canada	WJC	4th	5	0	1	1	8
2014	Canada	WJC	4th	4	1	1	2	2
Junior totals				20	2	8	10	20

== Awards and honours ==
Award	Year
WHL
East Second All-Star Team	2014
WHL Playoff MVP	2014
Memorial Cup champion	2014
Ed Chynoweth Cup champion	2012, 2014

Awards and achievements
Preceded by Ryan Strome	New York Islanders first round pick 2012	Succeeded by Ryan Pulock
