= Louis Crevier =

Canadian ice hockey player (born 2001)

- Born: May 4, 2001 (age 25) Quebec City, Québec, Canada
- Height: 6 ft 8 in (203 cm)
- Weight: 228 lb (103 kg; 16 st 4 lb)
- Position: Defence
- Shoots: Right
- NHL team Former teams: Buffalo Sabres; Chicago Blackhawks
- NHL draft: 188th overall, 2020; Chicago Blackhawks
- Playing career: 2022–present

Louis Crevier (born May 4, 2001) is a Canadian professional ice hockey player who is a defenceman for the Buffalo Sabres of the National Hockey League (NHL).

== Playing career ==
Crevier played junior for the Chicoutimi Saguenéens and the Quebec Remparts in the Quebec Maritimes Junior Hockey League (QMJHL) and was selected by the Blackhawks in the seventh-round, 188th overall, of the 2020 NHL entry draft. He signed with the Blackhawks in 2023 and made his debut on December 3, 2023, against the Minnesota Wild. On November 27, 2024, Crevier scored his first career NHL goal against the Dallas Stars.

On June 23, 2026, Crevier alongside the 4th and 45th overall pick in the 2026 NHL entry draft were traded to the Buffalo Sabres in exchange for Bowen Byram and Jordan Greenway.

== Career statistics ==
			Regular season					Playoffs
Season	Team	League	GP	G	A	Pts	PIM	GP	G	A	Pts	PIM
2016–17	Séminaire St-François Blizzard	QMAAA	1	0	0	0	0	—	—	—	—	—
2017–18	Séminaire St-François Blizzard	QMAAA	40	5	5	10	12	5	0	0	0	2
2018–19	Chicoutimi Saguenéens	QMJHL	44	0	4	4	2	4	0	1	1	0
2019–20	Chicoutimi Saguenéens	QMJHL	59	10	11	21	16	—	—	—	—	—
2020–21	Chicoutimi Saguenéens	QMJHL	26	6	8	14	12	9	1	2	3	0
2021–22	Quebec Remparts	QMJHL	62	10	26	36	18	12	4	6	10	4
2022–23	Rockford IceHogs	AHL	62	0	5	5	14	2	0	0	0	0
2023–24	Rockford IceHogs	AHL	41	3	8	11	18	4	0	0	0	0
2023–24	Chicago Blackhawks	NHL	24	0	3	3	4	—	—	—	—	—
2024–25	Rockford IceHogs	AHL	15	1	3	4	6	—	—	—	—	—
2024–25	Chicago Blackhawks	NHL	32	3	1	4	10	—	—	—	—	—
2025–26	Chicago Blackhawks	NHL	78	7	18	25	63	—	—	—	—	—
NHL totals			134	10	22	32	77	—	—	—	—	—
