= Ilya Mikheyev =

Russian ice hockey player (born 1994)

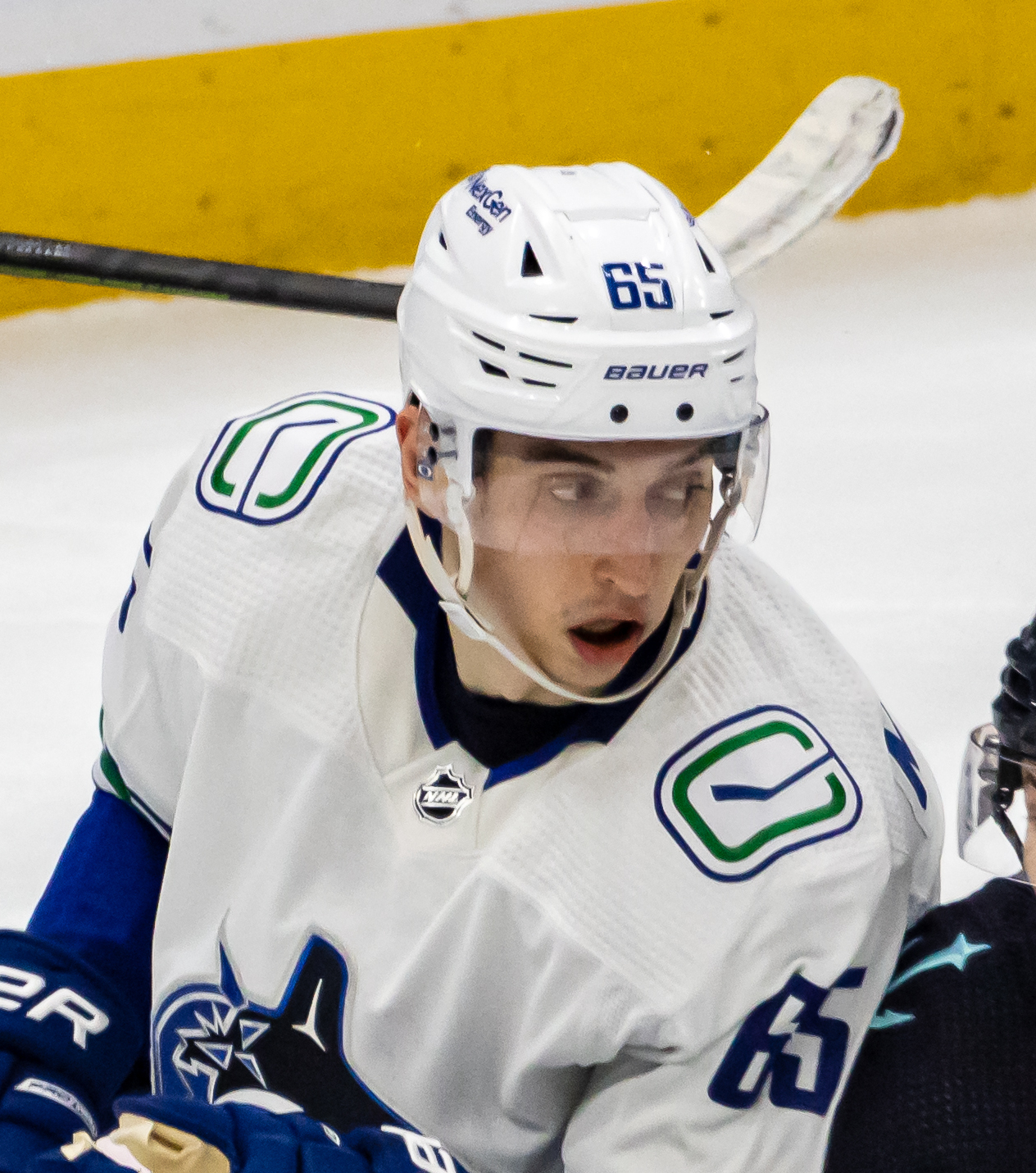
- Mikheyev with the Vancouver Canucks in 2023
- Born: 10 October 1994 (age 31) Omsk, Russia
- Height: 6 ft 2 in (188 cm)
- Weight: 192 lb (87 kg; 13 st 10 lb)
- Position: Forward
- Shoots: Left
- NHL team Former teams: Tampa Bay Lightning; Avangard Omsk; Toronto Maple Leafs; Vancouver Canucks; Chicago Blackhawks
- National team: Russia
- NHL draft: Undrafted
- Playing career: 2012–present

Ilya Andreyevich Mikheyev (Russian: Илья Андреевич Михеев; born 10 October 1994) is a Russian professional ice hockey player who is a forward for the Tampa Bay Lightning of the National Hockey League (NHL). He has previously played with the Toronto Maple Leafs, Vancouver Canucks, and Chicago Blackhawks of the NHL and Avangard Omsk of the Kontinental Hockey League.

== Early life ==
Mikheyev was born in Omsk, Russia, in southwestern Siberia, to parents Andrey and Natalya. Andrey is a lawyer and law-school lecturer while Natalya is a director in a private company. Mikheyev has an undergraduate degree in sports tourism and a master's degree in sports science.

== Playing career ==
=== Russia ===
Mikheyev started his career in the school of Avangard Omsk. In 2012 he started playing in the youth team Omskie Yastreby in the MHL. In 2013, returned to Omskie Yastreby and finished fifth in league scoring. He won the Kharlamov Cup with his team. In the 2013–14 season he started playing for Yermak Angarsk, the farm team of Avangard in the VHL. With Yermak Angarsk, he won the Nadezhda Cup. Over the next seasons, he also played for Sokol Krasnoyarsk and Saryarka Karagandy, that time farm teams of Avangard, in the VHL. In the 2015–16 season he started playing for Avangard in the Kontinental Hockey League. He established himself quickly in the team. The 2017–18 season he finished as the top scorer of Avangard with 38 points.

In 62 games during the 2018–19 season, Mikheyev recorded 23 goals and 22 assists for 45 points to again finish as the club's top point scorer. In the post-season, he helped Avangard reach the Gagarin Cup finals recording 11 points in 13 games. He was named a 2018–19 KHL First Team All-Star.

=== North America ===
On 6 May 2019, Mikheyev signed a one-year, entry-level contract with the Toronto Maple Leafs of the National Hockey League (NHL). On 2 October 2019, during the Maple Leafs' home opener, Mikheyev scored his first NHL goal and added an assist in a 5–3 victory over the Ottawa Senators. After his debut, he made a passing comment about how he loved soup, which eventually led to a partnership with the Campbell's. In an away game against the New Jersey Devils on 27 December, Devils forward Jesper Bratt fell, causing his skate blade to cut Mikheyev's wrist. Mikheyev suffered a laceration on his wrist and was removed from the game. He immediately underwent surgery at University Hospital in Newark to repair an artery and tendons in his wrist. Leafs general manager Kyle Dubas and assistant athletic trainer Jon Geller cleared their schedules so Mikheyev would have familiar people around in the three days between his surgery and flying back to Toronto. Mikheyev did not return for the remainder of the regular season, which was cut short due to the COVID-19 pandemic, but was able to return for the playoffs. He went pointless in five games as the Leafs fell to the Columbus Blue Jackets in the first round.

On 20 October 2020, Mikheyev signed a 2-year, $3.29 million contract with the Maple Leafs, avoiding his salary arbitration hearing which had been set for the following day. It was also reported that Mikheyev willingly reduced his salary after a request from Leafs general manager Dubas, to ensure the team would remain under the salary cap. During the 2020–21 season, Mikheyev played primarily on the team's third line in a checking forward situation. In the following playoffs against the Montreal Canadiens he was again held scoreless, increasing his total to 12 playoff games without a single point. It was reported he requested a trade following the season due to a lack of playing time and usage but was denied by Leafs management. In his final season with the Maple Leafs, he established career highs in goals (21) and points (32) in 53 games. He also appeared in all seven of the Maple Leafs' playoff games scoring two goals and four points.

On 13 July 2022, Mikheyev left the Maple Leafs in free agency and signed a four-year, $19 million contract with the Vancouver Canucks. In his first pre-season game with the Canucks on 25 September during the 2022 training camp, Mikheyev tore his anterior cruciate ligament. He missed the rest of pre-season and made his debut during the Canucks fourth game of the year against the Columbus Blue Jackets on 18 October. After 43 games, the Canucks shut Mikheyev down in January 2023 and he underwent surgery to repair the injury. Mikheyev scored 13 goals and 28 points. Mikheyev missed the remainder of the 2022–23 season.

During the 2023–24 season, Mikheyev scored 11 goals and 31 points in 78 regular season games. Shortly after the season's conclusion, on 26 June 2024, the Canucks traded Mikheyev, Sam Lafferty, and a 2027 second round pick to the Chicago Blackhawks in exchange for a fourth round pick in 2027.

On 1 July 2026, Mikheyev signed as a free agent to a four-year, $15.4 million contract with the Tampa Bay Lightning.

== International play ==
In 2017, Mikheyev played for Team Russia at the 2017 Deutschland Cup. He was later added to make his full international debut for Russia at the 2018 World Championships in Denmark.

== Career statistics ==
=== Regular season and playoffs ===
			Regular season					Playoffs
Season	Team	League	GP	G	A	Pts	PIM	GP	G	A	Pts	PIM
2012–13	Omskie Yastreby	MHL	52	13	18	31	2	12	1	3	4	0
2013–14	Omskie Yastreby	MHL	56	34	37	71	12	14	4	5	9	6
2013–14	Yermak Angarsk	VHL	3	0	2	2	0	—	—	—	—	—
2014–15	Sokol Krasnoyarsk	VHL	49	7	9	16	8	—	—	—	—	—
2014–15	Omskie Yastreby	MHL	—	—	—	—	—	5	4	1	5	0
2014–15	Avangard Omsk	KHL	—	—	—	—	—	2	0	0	0	0
2015–16	Avangard Omsk	KHL	52	8	10	18	16	10	0	1	1	2
2016–17	Avangard Omsk	KHL	56	12	7	19	10	12	2	3	5	2
2016–17	Saryarka Karagandy	VHL	—	—	—	—	—	1	0	1	1	0
2017–18	Avangard Omsk	KHL	54	19	19	38	6	7	0	2	2	2
2018–19	Avangard Omsk	KHL	62	23	22	45	8	13	4	7	11	4
2019–20	Toronto Maple Leafs	NHL	39	8	15	23	4	5	0	0	0	0
2020–21	Toronto Maple Leafs	NHL	54	7	10	17	6	7	0	0	0	0
2021–22	Toronto Maple Leafs	NHL	53	21	11	32	26	7	2	2	4	6
2022–23	Vancouver Canucks	NHL	46	13	15	28	2	—	—	—	—	—
2023–24	Vancouver Canucks	NHL	78	11	20	31	4	11	0	0	0	0
2024–25	Chicago Blackhawks	NHL	80	20	14	34	16	—	—	—	—	—
2025–26	Chicago Blackhawks	NHL	77	18	18	36	18	—	—	—	—	—
KHL totals			224	62	58	120	40	44	6	13	19	10
NHL totals			427	98	103	201	76	30	2	2	4	6

=== International ===
Year	Team	Event	Result	GP	G	A	Pts	PIM
2018	Russia	WC	6th	8	3	1	4	0
Senior totals				8	3	1	4	0
