= Basgall =

Basgall is a surname. Notable people with the surname include:

- Matt Basgall (born 2002), American ice hockey player
- Monty Basgall (1922–2005), American baseball player
