= Sam Rinzel =

American ice hockey player (born 2004)

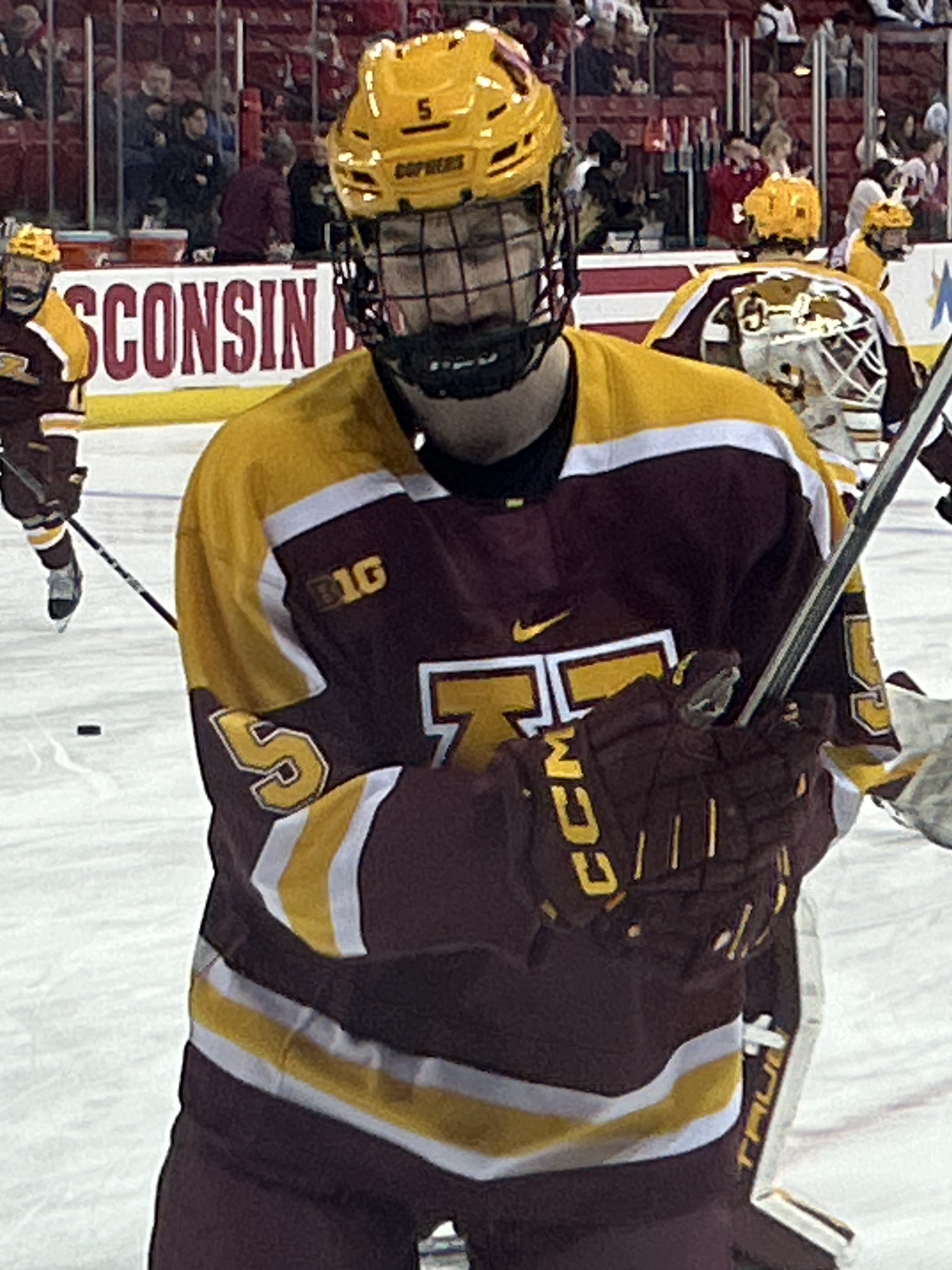
- Rinzel with the Minnesota Golden Gophers in February 2024
- Born: June 25, 2004 (age 21) Chanhassen, Minnesota, U.S.
- Height: 6 ft 4 in (193 cm)
- Weight: 194 lb (88 kg; 13 st 12 lb)
- Position: Defense
- Shoots: Right
- NHL team: Chicago Blackhawks
- NHL draft: 25th overall, 2022; Chicago Blackhawks
- Playing career: 2025–present

Sam Rinzel (born June 25, 2004) is an American professional ice hockey defenseman for the Chicago Blackhawks of the National Hockey League (NHL). He was drafted by the Blackhawks 25th overall in the 2022 NHL entry draft. He played college ice hockey for the University of Minnesota.

== Playing career ==
At the conclusion of his junior season with the University of Minnesota in 2024–25, Rinzel concluded his collegiate career by signing a three-year, entry-level contract with the Chicago Blackhawks on March 29, 2025. He played in nine games in the 2024–25 NHL season and registered five assists.

During the 2025–26 season, Rinzel scored his first NHL goal during a 3–2 loss to the Montreal Canadiens on October 11, 2025. On December 8, after recording eight points in 28 games, he was assigned to the Rockford IceHogs, Chicago's American Hockey League (AHL) affiliate.

== International play ==
Medal record

Men's ice hockey

Representing United States

World Junior Championships
Gold medal – first place	2024 Sweden	

On December 16, 2023, Rinzel was named to the United States junior team to compete at the 2024 World Junior Championships.

== Career statistics ==
=== Regular season and playoffs ===
			Regular season					Playoffs
Season	Team	League	GP	G	A	Pts	PIM	GP	G	A	Pts	PIM
2019–20	Chaska High	USHS	25	4	5	9	8	3	0	0	0	0
2020–21	Chaska High	USHS	19	8	17	25	12	—	—	—	—	—
2021–22	Chaska High	USHS	27	9	29	38	22	—	—	—	—	—
2021–22	Waterloo Black Hawks	USHL	21	2	8	10	8	6	0	0	0	4
2022–23	Waterloo Black Hawks	USHL	58	9	27	36	36	3	1	2	3	2
2023–24	University of Minnesota	B1G	39	2	26	28	20	—	—	—	—	—
2024–25	University of Minnesota	B1G	40	10	22	32	12	—	—	—	—	—
2024–25	Chicago Blackhawks	NHL	9	0	5	5	0	—	—	—	—	—
2025–26	Chicago Blackhawks	NHL	54	4	10	14	44	—	—	—	—	—
2025–26	Rockford IceHogs	AHL	23	2	12	14	16	—	—	—	—	—
NHL totals			63	4	15	19	44	—	—	—	—	—

=== International ===
Year	Team	Event	Result	GP	G	A	Pts	PIM
2021	United States	HG18	5th	4	0	0	0	2
2024	United States	WJC	1st place, gold medalist(s)	7	0	1	1	2
Junior totals				11	0	1	1	4

== Awards and honors ==
Award	Year	Ref
College
Big Ten Defensive Player of the Year	2025	
All-Big Ten First Team	2025	
All-Big Ten Second Team	2024	
All-Big Ten Freshman Team	2024	
AHCA West First Team All-American	2025	

Awards and achievements
Preceded by Frank Nazar	Chicago Blackhawks first-round draft pick 2022	Succeeded by Connor Bedard
Preceded by Artyom Levshunov	Big Ten Defensive Player of the Year; 2024–25	Succeeded by Matt Basgall
