= 2017 NHL expansion draft =

Player selection draft

General information
- Date: June 21, 2017
- Location: T-Mobile Arena; Paradise, Nevada, U.S.

Overview
- League: National Hockey League
- Expansion team: Vegas Golden Knights
- Expansion season: 2017–18

The 2017 NHL expansion draft was an expansion draft conducted by the National Hockey League (NHL) on June 18–20, 2017 to fill the roster of the league's expansion team for the 2017–18 season, the Vegas Golden Knights. The team's selections were announced on June 21 during the NHL Awards ceremony at T-Mobile Arena.

After Las Vegas' expansion bid was approved in June 2016, the Golden Knights began formal operations in March 2017. Vegas selected one player from each of the league's 30 franchises, with 19 going on to play for Vegas in their inaugural season. A further three inaugural-season players were acquired in trades relating to the Golden Knights' draft selections. As of the start of the 2026–27 season, three of those 22 players remain with the franchise.

== Background ==
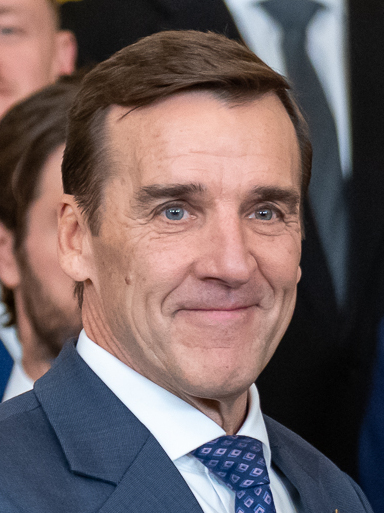
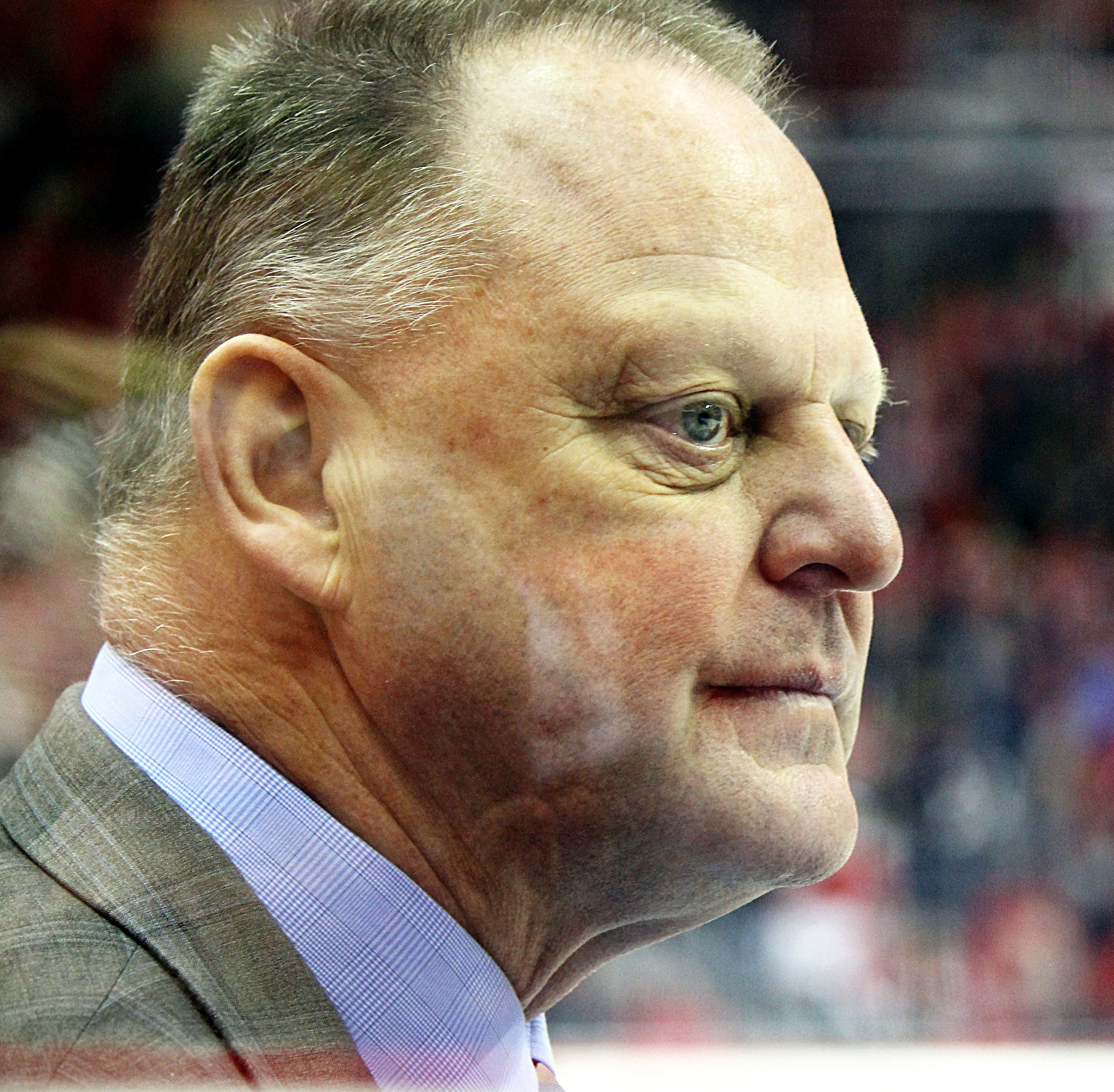
George McPhee and Gerard Gallant respectively served as the team's first general manager and head coach.

In the off-season before the 2015–16 NHL season, the NHL opened a window for ownership groups to bid for expansion teams for the first time since 2000. Two ownership groups submitted bids to the league: one each from Las Vegas and Quebec City. The Vegas bid would make the NHL the first "Big Four" major professional sports league to place a franchise in Las Vegas, though the league previously had a limited presence in the city with annual pre-season games, beginning with an outdoor game in 1991 and the Frozen Fury series held each year since 1997. Quebec City was previously home of the Quebec Nordiques, a team that had moved in 1995 and became the Colorado Avalanche; it has hosted occasional preseason games since that time, and has constructed a new ice hockey arena to receive a potential NHL team. Due to political delays, a bid was not submitted from Seattle despite the presence of three different ownership groups publicly campaigning to start an NHL team; a number of other potential expansion sites, such as Kansas City and Saskatchewan, declined to place bids because of cost concerns. Expansion to Seattle was later approved in 2018, with the franchise entering the league in 2021.

Las Vegas was approved for the 2017–18 NHL season on June 22, 2016; at the same time the Quebec City bid was deferred, largely because of concerns over the Canadian dollar's value and the geographic balance of the league's conferences. Former Washington Capitals general manager George McPhee was named Las Vegas' first general manager on July 13, with the team's name revealed as the Vegas Golden Knights on November 22. Five days after formally entering the league on March 1, 2017, the Golden Knights signed Canadian center Reid Duke to a three-year, entry-level contract, making him the franchise's first player. A month later, on April 13, recently-fired Florida Panthers head coach Gerard Gallant was named Vegas' first head coach. The same month, the NHL announced that the Golden Knights' expansion draft selections would be announced alongside the annual NHL Awards ceremony at T-Mobile Arena, the Golden Knights' home arena.

== Rules ==
The initial proposal of the rules for the draft was decided upon by the NHL in March 2016. They allowed each team to either protect seven forwards, three defencemen, and one goaltender or one goaltender and eight skaters regardless of position. Because the NHL wanted to ensure the competitive viability of the new team, the number of protected players allowed was lower than in the 2000 NHL expansion draft which populated the Minnesota Wild and Columbus Blue Jackets, when each team could protect nine forwards, five defencemen, and one goalie, or two goalies, three defencemen, and seven forwards. Under these rules, each of the 30 teams would lose one top-four defenceman or third-line forward per number of new teams. Only players with more than two years of professional experience — NHL or AHL as defined in the collective bargaining agreement—were included in the draft.

Teams had to submit their list of protected players by June 17, 2017. They had to expose at least two forwards and one defenceman that had played at least 40 games in the 2016–17 season or more than 70 games in the 2015–16 season and 2016–17 seasons combined, and had to still be under contract for the 2017–18 season. The exposed goaltender had to either be under contract for the 2017–18 season or have become a restricted free agent following the 2016–17 season. At least 20 of the 30 players selected by Vegas had to be under contract for the 2017–18 season, and they were required to select a minimum of 14 forwards, nine defencemen and three goaltenders. Vegas was granted a 48-hour window prior to the draft to sign any pending free agent (restricted or unrestricted, one per team) that was left unprotected. If a team lost a player to Vegas during this signing window they did not have a player selected from their roster during this draft.

Teams were required to protect any contracted players with no move clauses (NMCs) with one of the team's slots for protected players, unless the contract expired on July 1, 2017, in which case the NMC was considered void for the draft. Players whose NMCs had limited no trade clauses had to still be protected, and any players with NMCs were able to waive the clause and become eligible for the expansion draft.

Any player picked in the expansion draft could not have their contract bought out until after the completion of the 2017–18 season. Vegas was guaranteed the same odds in the draft lottery as the third–lowest finishing team from the 2016–17 NHL season for the 2017 NHL entry draft; after their first season they were subject to the same draft lottery rules as the other teams in the league. The NHL's deputy commissioner, Bill Daly, said that teams that did not follow the expansion draft rules would face penalties, saying "It's a loss of draft picks and/or players."

== Protected players ==
The protected players' list was published on June 18, 2017.

=== Eastern Conference ===
* and Italics: Players protected for contractual reasons.

Atlantic Division
Position	Boston	Buffalo	Detroit	Florida	Montreal	Ottawa	Tampa Bay	Toronto
Forwards	David Backes	Tyler Ennis	Justin Abdelkader	Aleksander Barkov	Paul Byron	Derick Brassard	Ryan Callahan*	Tyler Bozak
Forwards	Patrice Bergeron*	Marcus Foligno	Andreas Athanasiou	Nick Bjugstad	Phillip Danault	Ryan Dzingel	Tyler Johnson	Connor Brown
Forwards	David Krejci*	Zemgus Girgensons	Anthony Mantha	Jonathan Huberdeau	Jonathan Drouin	Mike Hoffman	Alex Killorn	Nazem Kadri
Forwards	Brad Marchand	Evander Kane	Frans Nielsen*	Vincent Trocheck	Alex Galchenyuk	Jean-Gabriel Pageau	Nikita Kucherov	Leo Komarov
Forwards	Riley Nash	Johan Larsson	Gustav Nyquist		Brendan Gallagher	Zack Smith	Vladislav Namestnikov	Josh Leivo
Forwards	David Pastrnak	Kyle Okposo*	Tomas Tatar		Max Pacioretty	Mark Stone	Ondrej Palat	Matt Martin
Forwards	Ryan Spooner	Ryan O'Reilly	Henrik Zetterberg		Andrew Shaw	Kyle Turris	Steven Stamkos*	James van Riemsdyk
Defencemen	Zdeno Chara*	Nathan Beaulieu	Danny DeKeyser	Aaron Ekblad	Jordie Benn	Cody Ceci	Braydon Coburn	Connor Carrick
Defencemen	Torey Krug	Jake McCabe	Mike Green	Alex Petrovic	Jeff Petry*	Erik Karlsson	Victor Hedman*	Jake Gardiner
Defencemen	Kevan Miller	Rasmus Ristolainen	Nick Jensen	Mark Pysyk	Shea Weber	Dion Phaneuf*	Anton Stralman	Morgan Rielly
Defencemen				Keith Yandle*				
Goaltender	Tuukka Rask	Robin Lehner	Jimmy Howard	James Reimer	Carey Price*	Craig Anderson	Andrei Vasilevskiy	Frederik Andersen

Metropolitan Division
Position	Carolina	Columbus	New Jersey	NY Islanders	NY Rangers	Philadelphia	Pittsburgh	Washington
Forwards	Phillip Di Giuseppe	Cam Atkinson	Taylor Hall	Andrew Ladd*	Kevin Hayes	Sean Couturier	Sidney Crosby*	Nicklas Backstrom
Forwards	Elias Lindholm	Brandon Dubinsky*	Adam Henrique	Anders Lee	Chris Kreider	Valtteri Filppula*	Patric Hornqvist	Andre Burakovsky
Forwards	Brock McGinn	Nick Foligno*	Kyle Palmieri	John Tavares*	J. T. Miller	Claude Giroux*	Phil Kessel*	Lars Eller
Forwards	Victor Rask	Scott Hartnell*	Travis Zajac		Rick Nash	Scott Laughton	Evgeni Malkin*	Marcus Johansson
Forwards	Jeff Skinner	Boone Jenner			Derek Stepan*	Brayden Schenn		Evgeny Kuznetsov
Forwards	Jordan Staal*	Brandon Saad			Mika Zibanejad	Wayne Simmonds		Alexander Ovechkin
Forwards	Teuvo Teravainen	Alexander Wennberg			Mats Zuccarello	Jakub Voracek		Tom Wilson
Defencemen	Trevor Carrick	Seth Jones	Andy Greene	Johnny Boychuk*	Nick Holden	Shayne Gostisbehere	Brian Dumoulin	John Carlson
Defencemen	Justin Faulk	Ryan Murray	John Moore	Travis Hamonic	Ryan McDonagh	Radko Gudas	Kris Letang*	Matt Niskanen
Defencemen	Ryan Murphy	David Savard	Mirco Muller	Nick Leddy	Marc Staal*	Brandon Manning	Olli Maatta	Dmitry Orlov
Defencemen			Damon Severson	Adam Pelech			Justin Schultz	
Defencemen				Ryan Pulock				
Goaltender	Scott Darling	Sergei Bobrovsky*	Cory Schneider	Thomas Greiss	Henrik Lundqvist*	Anthony Stolarz	Matt Murray	Braden Holtby

=== Western Conference ===
Central Division
Position	Chicago	Colorado	Dallas	Minnesota	Nashville	St. Louis	Winnipeg
Forwards	Artem Anisimov*	Sven Andrighetto	Jamie Benn*	Charlie Coyle	Viktor Arvidsson	Patrik Berglund	Joel Armia
Forwards	Ryan Hartman	Blake Comeau	Radek Faksa	Mikael Granlund	Filip Forsberg	Ryan Reaves	Andrew Copp
Forwards	Marian Hossa*	Matt Duchene	Valeri Nichushkin	Mikko Koivu*	Calle Jarnkrok	Jaden Schwartz	Bryan Little
Forwards	Tomas Jurco	Rocco Grimaldi	Brett Ritchie	Nino Niederreiter	Ryan Johansen	Vladimir Sobotka	Adam Lowry
Forwards	Patrick Kane*	Gabriel Landeskog	Antoine Roussel	Zach Parise*		Paul Stastny	Mathieu Perreault
Forwards	Richard Panik	Nathan MacKinnon	Tyler Seguin	Jason Pominville*		Alexander Steen	Mark Scheifele
Forwards	Jonathan Toews*	Matt Nieto	Jason Spezza*	Jason Zucker		Vladimir Tarasenko	Blake Wheeler
Defencemen	Niklas Hjalmarsson*	Tyson Barrie	Stephen Johns	Jonas Brodin	Mattias Ekholm	Jay Bouwmeester	Dustin Byfuglien*
Defencemen	Duncan Keith*	Erik Johnson*	John Klingberg	Jared Spurgeon	Ryan Ellis	Joel Edmundson	Tyler Myers
Defencemen	Brent Seabrook*	Nikita Zadorov	Esa Lindell	Ryan Suter*	Roman Josi	Alex Pietrangelo	Jacob Trouba
Defencemen					P. K. Subban		
Goaltender	Corey Crawford*	Semyon Varlamov	Ben Bishop	Devan Dubnyk	Pekka Rinne*	Jake Allen	Connor Hellebuyck

Pacific Division
Position	Anaheim	Arizona	Calgary	Edmonton	Los Angeles	San Jose	Vancouver	Vegas
Forwards	Andrew Cogliano	Nick Cousins	Mikael Backlund	Leon Draisaitl	Jeff Carter	Ryan Carpenter	Sven Bartschi	Drafting
Forwards	Ryan Getzlaf*	Anthony Duclair	Sam Bennett	Jordan Eberle	Anze Kopitar*	Logan Couture	Loui Eriksson*	Drafting
Forwards	Ryan Kesler*	Jordan Martinook	Micheal Ferland	Zack Kassian	Tanner Pearson	Jannik Hansen	Markus Granlund	Drafting
Forwards	Corey Perry*	Tobias Rieder	Michael Frolík	Mark Letestu	Tyler Toffoli	Tomas Hertl	Bo Horvat	Drafting
Forwards	Rickard Rakell		Johnny Gaudreau	Milan Lucic*		Melker Karlsson	Daniel Sedin*	Drafting
Forwards	Jakob Silfverberg		Curtis Lazar	Patrick Maroon		Joe Pavelski	Henrik Sedin*	Drafting
Forwards	Antoine Vermette		Sean Monahan	Ryan Nugent-Hopkins		Chris Tierney	Brandon Sutter	Drafting
Defencemen	Kevin Bieksa*	Oliver Ekman-Larsson	T. J. Brodie	Oscar Klefbom	Drew Doughty	Justin Braun	Alexander Edler	Drafting
Defencemen	Cam Fowler	Alex Goligoski*	Mark Giordano	Adam Larsson	Derek Forbort	Brent Burns	Erik Gudbranson	Drafting
Defencemen	Hampus Lindholm	Connor Murphy	Dougie Hamilton	Andrej Sekera*	Alec Martinez	Marc-Edouard Vlasic	Christopher Tanev	Drafting
Defencemen		Luke Schenn			Jake Muzzin			Drafting
Goaltender	John Gibson	Chad Johnson	Mike Smith	Cam Talbot*	Jonathan Quick	Martin Jones	Jacob Markstrom	Drafting

== Draft results ==
Key: LW = Left wing, C= Center, RW = Right wing, D = Defenseman, G = Goaltender

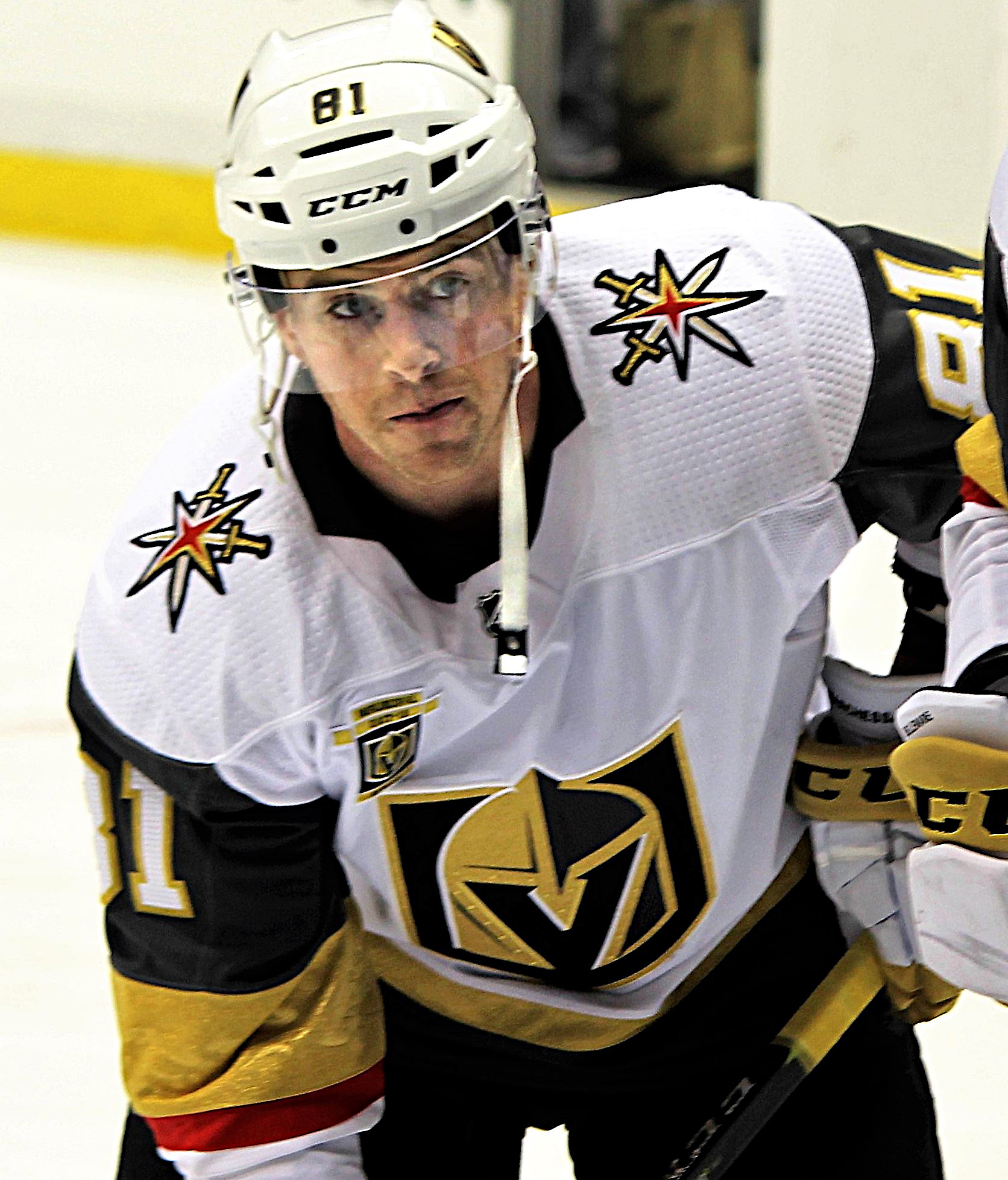
Center Jonathan Marchessault would go on to win the Conn Smythe Trophy with Vegas in 2023.

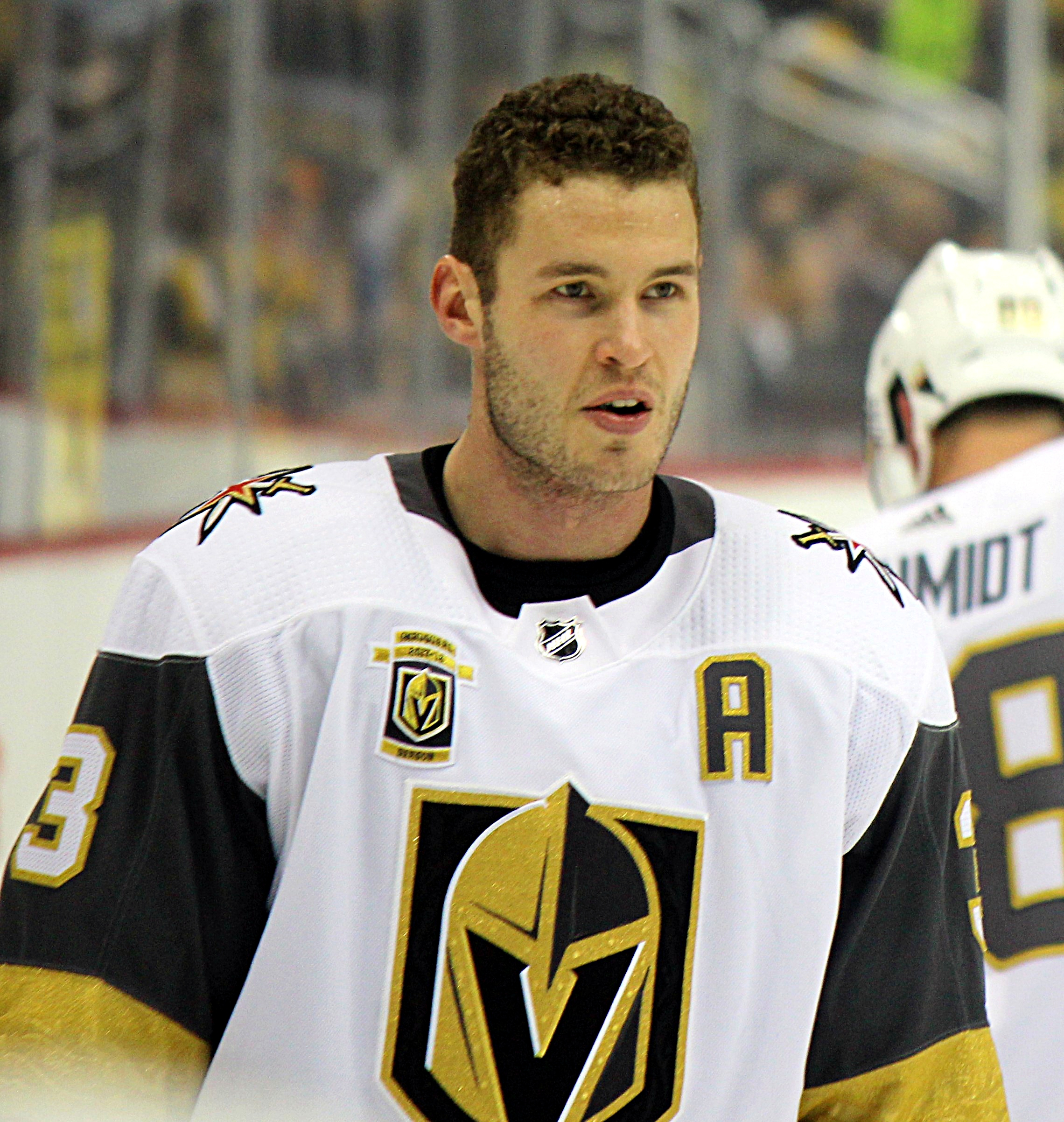
Defenseman Brayden McNabb is the Golden Knights' all-time leader in games played as of 2026.

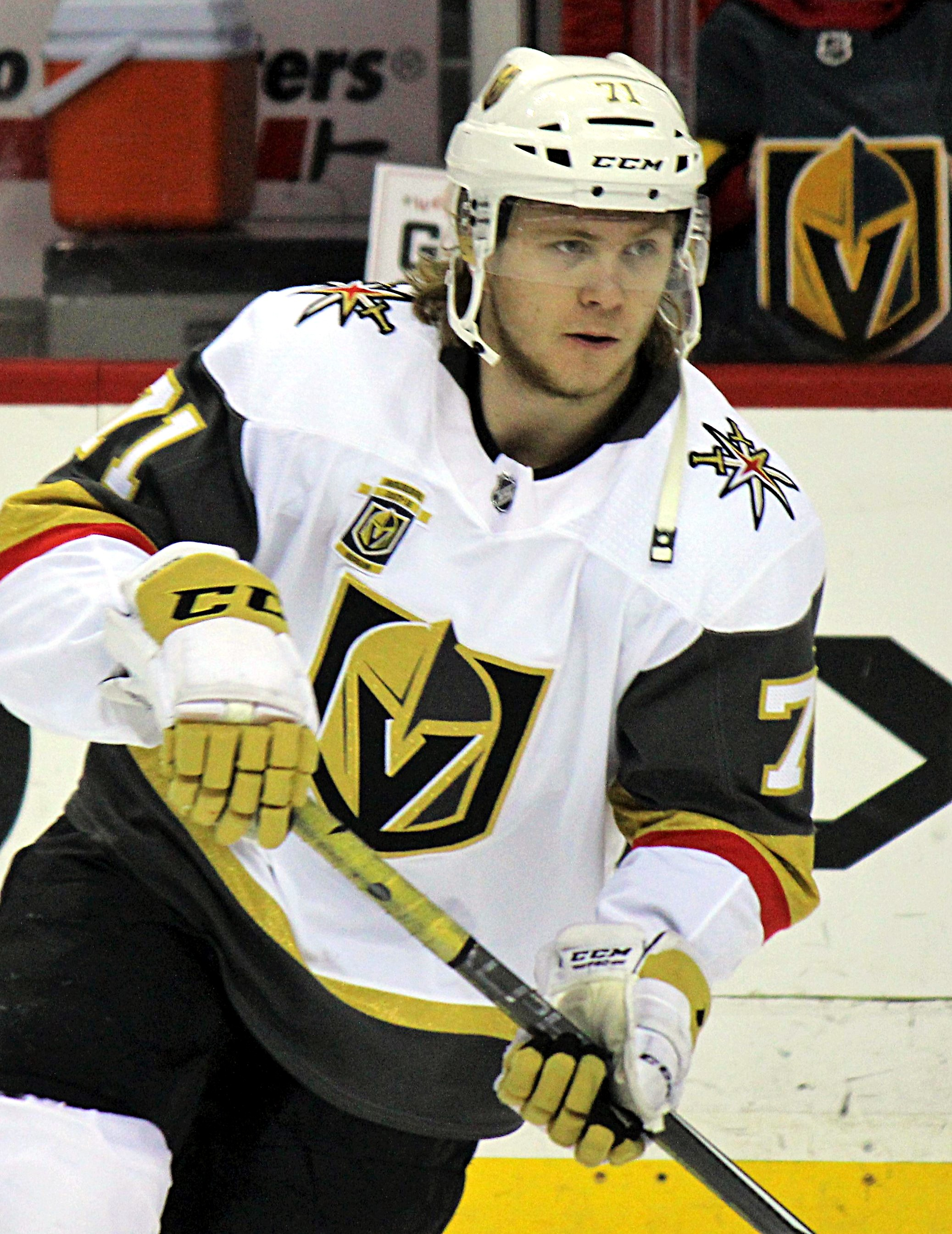
Center William Karlsson scored 43 goals and won the Lady Byng Memorial Trophy in Vegas' inaugural season.

Vegas Golden Knights expansion draft selections
No.	Player	Pos.	Drafted from
1.	Calvin Pickard	G	Colorado Avalanche
2.	Luca Sbisa	D	Vancouver Canucks
3.	Teemu Pulkkinen	LW	Arizona Coyotes
4.	Jon Merrill	D	New Jersey Devils
5.	William Carrier	LW	Buffalo Sabres
6.	Cody Eakin	C	Dallas Stars
7.	Tomas Nosek	LW	Detroit Red Wings
8.	Jonathan Marchessault	C	Florida Panthers
9.	Brayden McNabb	D	Los Angeles Kings
10.	Connor Brickley	C	Carolina Hurricanes
11.	Chris Thorburn	RW	Winnipeg Jets
12.	Pierre-Edouard Bellemare	RW	Philadelphia Flyers
13.	Jason Garrison	D	Tampa Bay Lightning
14.	Jean-Francois Berube	G	New York Islanders
15.	James Neal	LW	Nashville Predators
16.	Deryk Engelland	D	Calgary Flames
17.	Brendan Leipsic	LW	Toronto Maple Leafs
18.	Colin Miller	D	Boston Bruins
19.	Marc Methot	D	Ottawa Senators
20.	David Schlemko	D	San Jose Sharks
21.	David Perron	LW	St. Louis Blues
22.	Oscar Lindberg	C	New York Rangers
23.	Griffin Reinhart	D	Edmonton Oilers
24.	Alexei Emelin	D	Montreal Canadiens
25.	Clayton Stoner	D	Anaheim Ducks
26.	Erik Haula	C	Minnesota Wild
27.	William Karlsson	C	Columbus Blue Jackets
28.	Trevor van Riemsdyk	D	Chicago Blackhawks
29.	Marc-Andre Fleury	G	Pittsburgh Penguins
30.	Nate Schmidt	D	Washington Capitals

== Trades ==
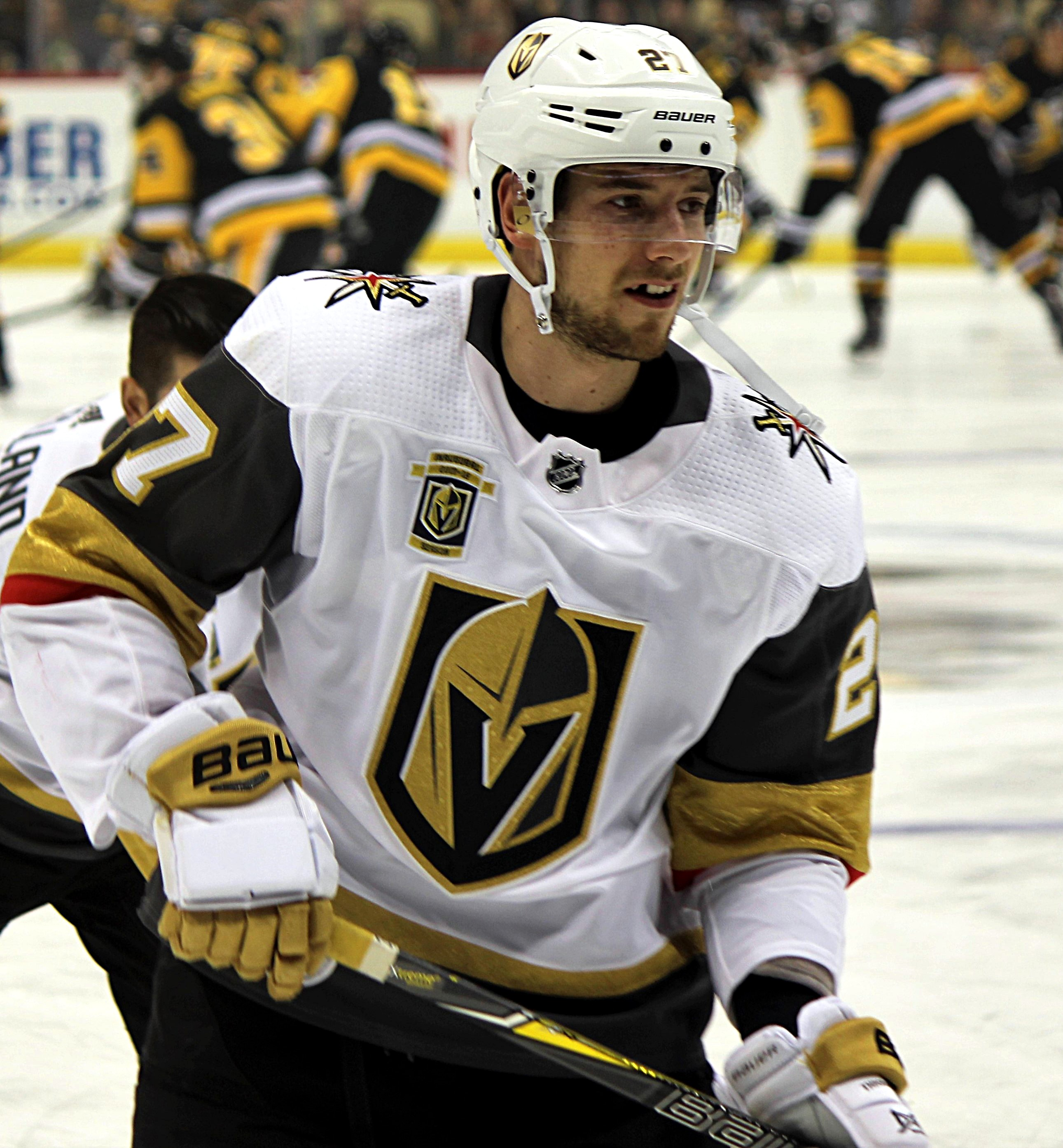
Defenseman and expansion concession Shea Theodore has played nine seasons for Vegas as of 2026.

In return for agreeing to select certain unprotected players, the Golden Knights were granted concessions by other franchises in the form of draft picks or other players.

Vegas Golden Knights expansion draft trade concessions
Team	Concession	Vegas selection	Ref.
Buffalo Sabres	6th-round pick in 2017 (#161 overall)	William Carrier	
Florida Panthers	Reilly Smith	Jonathan Marchessault; FLA receives 4th-round pick in 2018	
Carolina Hurricanes	BOS 5th-round pick in 2017 (#142 overall)	Connor Brickley	
Winnipeg Jets	1st-round pick in 2017 (#13 overall); 3rd-round pick in 2019	Chris Thorburn; WPG receives CBJ 1st-round pick in 2017 (#24 overall)	
Tampa Bay Lightning	Nikita Gusev; 2nd-round pick in 2017 (#45 overall); PIT 4th-round pick in 2018	Jason Garrison	
New York Islanders	Jake Bischoff; Mikhail Grabovski; 1st-round pick in 2017 (#15 overall); 2nd-round pick in 2019	Jean-Francois Berube	
Anaheim Ducks	Shea Theodore	Clayton Stoner	
Minnesota Wild	Alex Tuch	Erik Haula	
Columbus Blue Jackets	David Clarkson; 1st-round pick in 2017 (#24 overall); 2nd-round pick in 2019	William Karlsson	
Pittsburgh Penguins	2nd-round pick in 2020	Marc-Andre Fleury	

Four of the seven players acquired via concession trades eventually played for Vegas. Alex Tuch played four seasons with Vegas before being traded to the Buffalo Sabres during the 2021–22 season, while Reilly Smith played six seasons and won the Stanley Cup with Vegas in 2023 before being traded to the Pittsburgh Penguins in June 2023; he later returned to Vegas via trade in March 2025, playing parts of two additional seasons. Shea Theodore remains with the team as of 2026. Additionally, Jake Bischoff played four games for Vegas during the 2019–20 season, and remained in Vegas' organization through the 2024–25 season.

Nikita Gusev was signed by Vegas during the 2019 Stanley Cup playoffs, but was traded to the New Jersey Devils due to salary cap constraints before playing a game for the franchise. Mikhail Grabovski had missed the entirety of the 2016–17 season with post-concussion syndrome; though he attended his physical with Vegas with the intention of returning, he ultimately did not play a game for the team during his one year under contract. Meanwhile, David Clarkson had not played since the 2015–16 season due to injury, with it being widely believed upon his acquisition that he would never play again; he subsequently remained on injured reserve until his contract was traded to the Toronto Maple Leafs on July 23, 2019.

== Post-draft ==
Not all players selected by the Golden Knights in the Expansion Draft remained with the team. Some players were traded in the following days, unrelated to the prior draft-concession trades. On June 22, the day after the draft, Trevor van Riemsdyk was traded alongside a seventh-round pick in 2018 to the Carolina Hurricanes for Pittsburgh's second-round pick in 2017; meanwhile, David Schlemko was traded to the Montreal Canadiens for a fifth-round pick in 2019. Four days later, on June 26, Marc Methot was traded to the Dallas Stars for Dylan Ferguson and a second-round pick in 2020. Several days after the July free agency period opened, Alexei Emelin was traded to the Nashville Predators for a third-round pick in 2018. First overall pick Calvin Pickard was originally intended to serve as the backup goaltender to Marc-Andre Fleury; however, after Vegas claimed Malcolm Subban off waivers on October 3, Pickard was traded to the Toronto Maple Leafs on October 6 for a sixth-round draft pick in 2018 and Tobias Lindberg.

Three expansion draft selections were unrestricted free agents and were not re-signed by Vegas before free agency opened. Connor Brickley signed a one-year contract with the Florida Panthers on July 1, while Chris Thorburn signed a two-year contract with the St. Louis Blues on the same day. Finally, Jean-Francois Berube signed a two-year contract with the Chicago Blackhawks, also on July 1.

Of the remaining 22 players selected by Vegas, 19 played at least one game for the team. Teemu Pulkkinen and Griffin Reinhart spent their entire tenures with the franchise in the American Hockey League before departing in free agency, while Clayton Stoner spent the remainder of his contract on injured reserve before joining Vegas' organization as a junior team coach in 2019. As of the beginning of the 2026–27 season, the tenth season after the draft, only William Karlsson and Brayden McNabb remain with Vegas.

== See also ==
- 2016–17 NHL transactions
- 2017 NHL entry draft
- 2017–18 NHL season
- 2021 NHL expansion draft
