= Jake Bischoff =

American ice hockey player (born 1994)

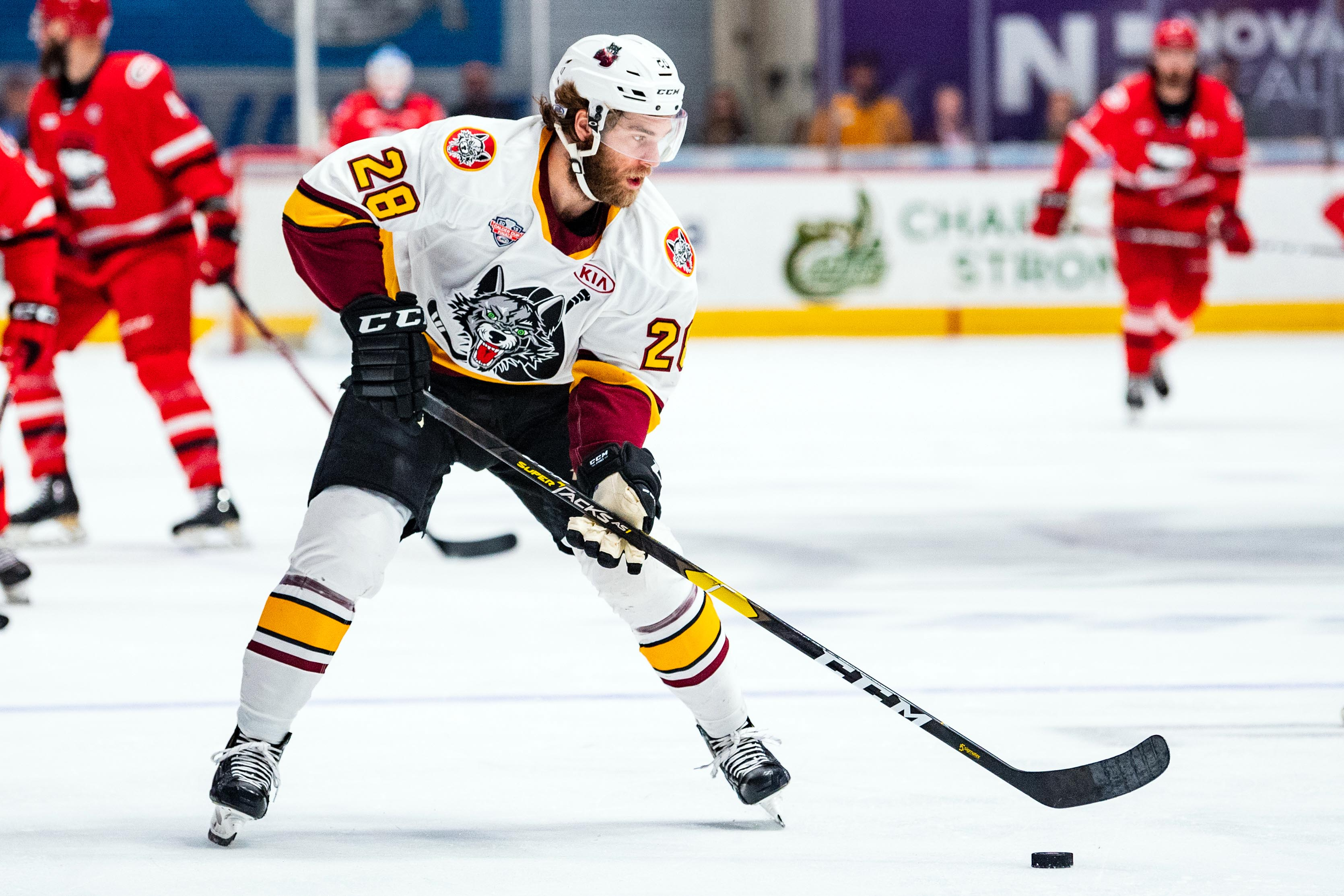
- Bischoff with the Chicago Wolves in 2019
- Born: July 25, 1994 (age 32) Cambridge, Minnesota, U.S.
- Height: 6 ft 1 in (185 cm)
- Weight: 194 lb (88 kg; 13 st 12 lb)
- Position: Defense
- Shoots: Left
- KHL team Former teams: Dinamo Minsk; Vegas Golden Knights; Shanghai Dragons
- NHL draft: 185th overall, 2012; New York Islanders
- Playing career: 2017–present

Jacob Michael Bischoff (born July 25, 1994) is an American professional ice hockey defenseman for HC Dinamo Minsk in the Kontinental Hockey League (KHL). He was drafted by the New York Islanders in the 2012 NHL entry draft.

== Early life ==
Bischoff was born on June 25, 1994, in Cambridge, Minnesota, as the oldest child to parents Jackie Tok and Grant Bischoff. His father played ice hockey for the University of Minnesota and was drafted by the Minnesota North Stars after his freshman year. As a result, Bischoff was trained by his father from a young age. His mother later died when he was 16 and his father re-married to Tammi McLaughlin. Bischoff's step brother Blake McLaughlin also plays hockey and was drafted by the Anaheim Ducks in 2018.

== Playing career ==
Bischoff played high school hockey in his native Minnesota with Grand Rapids High and parts of two seasons with the Omaha Lancers of the United States Hockey League (USHL) before committing and playing collegiate hockey for the University of Minnesota.

As an alternate captain with the Gophers, Bischoff completed a four-year collegiate career, having his most productive season in his senior year during the 2016–17 season, compiling 5 goals and 27 assists for 32 points in 38 games from the blueline. He was selected as the Big Ten Defensive Player of the Year.

Originally drafted out of high school by the New York Islanders in the seventh-round, 185th overall, of the 2012 NHL entry draft, Bischoff was signed to a two-year, entry-level contract with the club following his senior season with the Golden Gophers on March 29, 2017. He immediately joined the Islanders' AHL affiliate, the Bridgeport Sound Tigers for the remainder of the regular season, posting 3 points in 6 games.

On June 21, 2017, Bischoff was traded by the Islanders, along with Mikhail Grabovski and a pair of draft selections to the Vegas Golden Knights, in exchange for 2017 NHL expansion draft considerations. In joining the Golden Knights in their inaugural season, Bischoff was assigned to AHL affiliate, the Chicago Wolves for his first full professional season in 2017–18.

On July 16, 2019, as a restricted free agent, Bischoff was signed to a three-year contract extension with the Golden Knights.

After missing the entirety of the 2021–22 season due to a lower body injury, Bischoff opted to remain within the Golden Knights organization, by signing a one-year AHL contract with affiliate, the Henderson Silver Knights, on July 14, 2022. Bischoff was later named captain of the Silver Knights on October 12, 2023, succeeding Brayden Pachal.

Following eight seasons in the Golden Knights' organization, Bischoff went overseas, signing a one-year contract with the Shanghai Dragons of the Kontinental Hockey League on August 15, 2025. After a lone season with the Dragons, Bischoff continued his career in the KHL by signing a one-year deal with Belarusian club, HC Dinamo Minsk, on August 25, 2026.

== Career statistics ==
			Regular season					Playoffs
Season	Team	League	GP	G	A	Pts	PIM	GP	G	A	Pts	PIM
2010–11	Grand Rapids High	USHS	27	5	24	29	14	3	0	6	6	2
2011–12	Grand Rapids High	USHS	25	11	29	40	17	1	0	2	2	0
2011–12	Omaha Lancers	USHL	10	0	1	1	2	—	—	—	—	—
2012–13	Grand Rapids High	USHS	16	7	11	18	4	3	1	6	7	4
2012–13	Omaha Lancers	USHL	12	0	2	2	0	—	—	—	—	—
2013–14	University of Minnesota	B1G	28	3	4	7	8	—	—	—	—	—
2014–15	University of Minnesota	B1G	36	3	8	11	0	—	—	—	—	—
2015–16	University of Minnesota	B1G	37	6	12	18	14	—	—	—	—	—
2016–17	University of Minnesota	B1G	38	5	27	32	16	—	—	—	—	—
2016–17	Bridgeport Sound Tigers	AHL	6	2	1	3	2	—	—	—	—	—
2017–18	Chicago Wolves	AHL	69	7	16	23	34	3	0	0	0	0
2018–19	Chicago Wolves	AHL	60	2	11	13	20	22	0	5	5	2
2019–20	Chicago Wolves	AHL	52	3	6	9	24	—	—	—	—	—
2019–20	Vegas Golden Knights	NHL	4	0	0	0	4	—	—	—	—	—
2020–21	Henderson Silver Knights	AHL	7	1	1	2	2	—	—	—	—	—
2022–23	Henderson Silver Knights	AHL	56	5	11	16	22	—	—	—	—	—
2023–24	Henderson Silver Knights	AHL	58	4	19	23	41	—	—	—	—	—
2024–25	Henderson Silver Knights	AHL	59	3	18	21	26	—	—	—	—	—
2025–26	Shanghai Dragons	KHL	52	2	7	9	51	—	—	—	—	—
NHL totals			4	0	0	0	4	—	—	—	—	—
KHL totals			52	2	7	9	51	—	—	—	—	—

== Awards and honors ==
Award	Year
College
B1G Honourable Mention All-Star Team	2016
B1G Sportsmanship Award	2016
B1G First All-Star Team	2017
B1G Defensive Player of the Year	2017

Awards and achievements
Preceded by Zach Werenski	Big Ten Defensive Player of the Year; 2016–17	Succeeded by Trevor Hamilton
Sporting positions
Preceded by Brayden Pachal	Henderson Silver Knights captain 2023–2025	Succeeded by Jaycob Megna
