= Mike Reilly (ice hockey) =

American ice hockey player (born 1993)

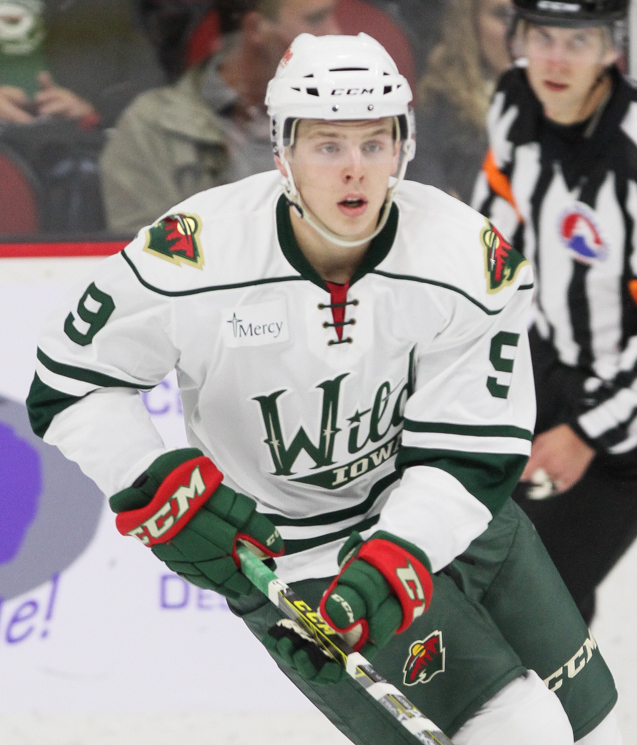
- Reilly with the Iowa Wild in 2015
- Born: July 13, 1993 (age 33) Chicago, Illinois, U.S.
- Height: 6 ft 2 in (188 cm)
- Weight: 191 lb (87 kg; 13 st 9 lb)
- Position: Defense
- Shoots: Left
- NHL team Former teams: Colorado Avalanche; Minnesota Wild; Montreal Canadiens; Ottawa Senators; Boston Bruins; Florida Panthers; New York Islanders; Carolina Hurricanes
- National team: United States
- NHL draft: 98th overall, 2011; Columbus Blue Jackets
- Playing career: 2015–present

Mike J. Reilly Jr. (born July 13, 1993) is an American professional ice hockey player who is a defenseman for the Colorado Avalanche of the National Hockey League (NHL). He was selected in the fourth round, 98th overall, by the Columbus Blue Jackets in the 2011 NHL entry draft and has previously played for the Minnesota Wild, Montreal Canadiens, Ottawa Senators, Boston Bruins, Florida Panthers, New York Islanders, and Carolina Hurricanes. Reilly won the Stanley Cup with the Hurricanes in 2026.

== Playing career ==
=== Amateur ===
Born in Chicago, Reilly grew up in Chanhassen, Minnesota. Reilly initially played as a forward, but in his first year of high school, switched positions to defense. After attending and playing high school hockey for the Academy of Holy Angels and Shattuck-St Mary's, Reilly joined his older brothers Connor and Ryan on the Penticton Vees of the British Columbia Hockey League for the 2011–12 season. In his only season with Penticton he recorded 24 goals and 59 assists for 83 points in 51 games played, leading all league defensemen in scoring. In the playoffs, Reilly added one goal and nine points in 15 games. The team won the RBC Cup and Doyle Cup and Reilly was named to the BCHL All-Rookie Team and given the BCHL Interior Conference Best Defenseman Award.

He committed to play for the University of Minnesota beginning in the 2012–13 season and as a freshman, he tallied three goals and 14 points in 37 appearances. Reilly proved himself to be an offensive weapon with the Golden Gophers, particularly in his sophomore and junior seasons, where he scored 33 and 42 points, respectively. This earned him Big Ten Conference's Defensive Player of the Year and First Team All-American in those years. In his sophomore year, Reilly was part of a Minnesota team that reached the finals in the 2014 NCAA tournament, where they were upset by the Cinderella story Union Dutchmen. He was a Hobey Baker Award finalist in his junior season in 2014–15 after leading all defensemen in the NCAA in assists and points.

=== Professional ===
==== Minnesota Wild ====
Reilly was selected 98th overall by the Columbus Blue Jackets of the National Hockey League (NHL) in the 2011 NHL entry draft. On May 16, 2015, it was announced that Reilly intended to turn pro and informed the Blue Jackets that he intended to test the free agent market once he would be able to do so on June 15. Reilly became one of the most coveted college free agents on the market due to his offensive statistics at Minnesota. On July 1, Reilly opted to stay in the state of Minnesota by signing a two-year, entry-level contract with the Minnesota Wild worth $1.85 million.

Although Reilly started his first professional season in the American Hockey League (AHL) with the Iowa Wild in 2015–16, after scoring 23 points in 45 games, Reilly was called up on January 9, 2016, and made his NHL debut in a 2–1 victory over the Dallas Stars later that day. He scored his first NHL goal and point on February 13, in a 4–2 loss to the Boston Bruins. Reilly played the rest of the season in Minnesota, and in 29 games, Reilly scored a goal and an assist. Reilly started the 2016–17 season on the NHL roster, but as the only defenseman capable of going between Minnesota and Iowa without requiring waivers, he was assigned to the AHL after appearing in one game on October 17. He was recalled on October 19 and returned to the AHL on October 22 before a second recall in November. In the new year, it was much of the same, being recalled in January 2017. Reilly would not find the stability at the NHL level that he did in his rookie year, bouncing between Minnesota and Iowa, and playing 17 games while registering a lone goal . In the AHL, however, Reilly would continue to show off his two-way skill, scoring five goals and 30 points in 57 games.

On July 3, Reilly re-signed with the Wild to a two-year $1.45 million contract. For the first time in his career, Reilly made the NHL roster to start the 2017–18 season. After a one game stint in Iowa, Reilly was in-and-out of the Wild lineup, most often paired with veteran Kyle Quincey on the third pairing. However, there was a surplus of young defensemen on the NHL roster, and as a result, Reilly's agent, Pat Brisson, was given permission to explore trades, despite Reilly not actively seeking for one. He scored two goals and eight assists in 38 games with the Wild.

==== Montreal Canadiens ====
On February 26, 2018, Minnesota traded Reilly to the Montreal Canadiens in exchange for a fifth-round pick in the 2019 NHL entry draft. After making his Canadiens debut on February 28 in a 3–1 victory over the New York Islanders. He tallied his first points for the Canadiens, two assists, in his next game, a 6–3 victory over the Islanders on March 2. Reilly found a bit of a scoring touch with the Canadiens, recording eight assists in the remaining 19 games. However, the Canadiens finished well outside the playoff picture for the season.

After a promising start to his Canadiens career, Reilly continued his success to start the 2018–19 season, and provided a good partner to captain Shea Weber. He scored his first goal with the team on October 17, in a 3–2 victory over the St. Louis Blues. Lineup crunches once again worked against Reilly's favor, as he found himself occasionally being a healthy scratch as the season went on, including his homecoming back to Minnesota. Although the Canadiens fought for a playoff spot, they finished outside the final wild card spot, and Reilly ended the season with 11 points in 57 games. Reilly signed a two-year extension with Montreal worth $3 million following the season. Fresh off an extension, Reilly looked to see regular playing time in the 2019–20 season. However, things went the complete opposite as planned. Reilly was a consistent scratch for the team, playing in only 14 games, marking only four assists.

==== Ottawa Senators ====
On January 2, 2020, Reilly was traded to the Ottawa Senators in exchange for forward Andrew Sturtz and a fifth-round pick in 2021. Reilly looked to solidify himself in an NHL lineup. Unlike with the Canadiens, Reilly was consistently in the Senators lineup during the season. His first point as a Senator came on January 10, with an assist on a goal by Colin White in a 3–2 loss to the Detroit Red Wings. He tallied his first goal for the team on January 28, the game winner in a 5–2 victory over the Buffalo Sabres. After scoring one goal and 12 points in 30 games with the Senators, the season was suddenly halted on March 12 when the NHL suspended play due to the COVID-19 pandemic. When the season resumed in July 2020, the Senators were not invited into the playoff bubble, ending Reilly's season. In the pandemic-shortened 2020–21 season Reilly got into 40 games with the Senators, recording 19 assists, which was a career high. As a pending unrestricted free agent on a struggling Senators team, Reilly's success made him a prime trade target approaching the NHL trade deadline in April 2021.

==== Boston Bruins ====
Reilly was traded to the Boston Bruins in exchange for a third-round pick in the 2022 NHL entry draft on April 11, 2021. Reilly proved to be a valuable deadline addition for the Bruins. In the final 15 games of the season, Reilly found instant chemistry with the Bruins alongside Brandon Carlo on the second pairing, marking eight assists. This helped set the Bruins up with a first-round matchup against the Washington Capitals, allowing Reilly to get his first taste of the Stanley Cup playoffs. Reilly scored his first and second playoff points, both assists, in the clinching Game 5 against the Capitals, allowing the Bruins to move on to the second round against the Islanders, whom they were eliminated by in six games. He registered four assists in 11 playoff games.

On July 27, 2021, Reilly signed a three-year, $9 million contract extension with the Bruins. In the 2021–22 season he made 70 appearances, scoring four goals and 13 assists. His season was inconsistent, playing well when paired with Charlie McAvoy, but after the arrival of Hampus Lindholm, found himself a healthy scratch once again, playing intermittingly. He played in five playoff games with the Bruins, going scoreless in the first round of the playoffs before they were eliminated by the Carolina Hurricanes. Due to the Bruins battling salary cap issues, as well as inconsistent play from Reilly, while in just his second season with the club in 2022–23, he was placed on waivers by the Bruins on November 9, 2022. In clearing the following day, Reilly's cap hit was buried and he was re-assigned and played the remainder of the season with the Bruins' AHL affiliate, the Providence Bruins. In ten games with Boston he marked one assist and in 36 games with Providence he tallied seven goals and 26 points. On February 24, 2023, Reilly scored his first professional hat-trick in a 6–5 win for Providence, adding two assists as well, resulting in a five-point night. He appeared in one playoff game with Providence, going scoreless. At the end of the season, on June 30, 2023, he was placed on waivers again for the purpose of buying out the remainder of his contract.

==== Florida Panthers ====
Released as an unrestricted free agent, Reilly was immediately signed on the opening day of free agency to a one-year, $1 million contract with the Florida Panthers on July 1. However, Reilly's Panthers tenure was short-lived. Despite making the Panthers opening night roster, Reilly did not see the ice until November 6, well into the season. Reilly was scoreless in two games with the Panthers before he was placed on waivers on November 24 to make room for the return of injured defensemen Brandon Montour and Aaron Ekblad.

==== New York Islanders ====
Reilly was claimed by the New York Islanders on November 25. Reilly made his Islanders debut in a 5–4 defeat by New Jersey Devils on November 28. His first goal with the Islanders was in a 5–4 overtime loss to San Jose Sharks on December 5. With the Islanders, Reilly seemingly found his scoring touch and had a career year. He had six goals and 18 assists in 59 games with the Islanders. He would also score his first career playoff goal in game five of the opening-round series against the Hurricanes, to whom the Islanders would fall in five games. In the offseason, he signed a one-year, $1.25 million contract with New York on July 1, 2024. In 18 games with the Islanders in the 2024–25 season, he recorded two assists before suffering a concussion in a game on November 1. However, during tests while recovering from the concussion a heart condition was uncovered. Reilly underwent surgery to correct the heart issue, missing the remainder of the season.

==== Carolina Hurricanes ====
As a free agent at the conclusion of his contract with the Islanders, Reilly joined his seventh NHL team in signing a one-year, $1.1 million contract with the Carolina Hurricanes for the 2025–26 season on July 1, 2025. Playing in a depth role on the Hurricanes, he made his debut on October 14, marking his first point when he assisted on Eric Robinson's goal in the 5–1 victory over the San Jose Sharks. He marked his first goal with the team, a shorthanded tally, in a 6–2 win over the Islanders on October 30. He made 42 appearances with Carolina, scoring the one goal and nine points. In the 2026 Stanley Cup playoffs, Reilly did not play in the first round series against the Senators, but was inserted into the lineup for game one on May 2, 2026, against the Philadelphia Flyers in the second round after Alexander Nikishin suffered a concussion. He made one more appearance in the playoffs, recording two assists in the two games as the Hurricanes went on to win the Stanley Cup. In the offseason, he signed a one-year, two-way contract to remain with Carolina on September 11. In the 2026–27 season he recorded two points in eight games with the Hurricanes before being placed on waivers on November 14.

==== Colorado Avalanche ====
The Colorado Avalanche claimed Reilly off waivers on November 15.

== International play ==
Medal record

Representing United States

Ice hockey

World Championships
| Bronze medal – third place | 2015 Czech Republic | |

IIHF World Junior Championship
| Gold medal – first place | 2013 Russia | |

Reilly was selected to join Team USA's junior team for the 2013 World Junior Championships. The team went on to win gold at the tournament. He played for Team USA's senior team at the 2015 World Championship, which won the bronze medal.

== Personal life ==
Reilly's father, Michael Sr., was drafted by the Montreal Canadiens in the eighth round of the 1977 NHL amateur draft, but ultimately never played in the NHL.

== Career statistics ==
=== Regular season and playoffs ===
| | | | Regular season | | | | | Playoffs |
| Season | Team | League | GP | G | A | Pts | PIM | GP | G | A | Pts | PIM |
|---|---|---|---|---|---|---|---|---|---|---|---|---|
| 2008–09 | Academy of Holy Angels | USHS | 25 | 2 | 24 | 26 | 12 | 2 | 0 | 1 | 1 | 0 |
| 2009–10 | Academy of Holy Angels | USHS | 24 | 4 | 29 | 33 | 19 | 2 | 3 | 2 | 5 | 0 |
| 2010–11 | Shattuck-Saint Mary's | USHS | 54 | 14 | 34 | 48 | 30 | — | — | — | — | — |
| 2011–12 | Penticton Vees | BCHL | 51 | 24 | 59 | 83 | 42 | 15 | 1 | 7 | 8 | 10 |
| 2012–13 | University of Minnesota | WCHA | 37 | 3 | 11 | 14 | 14 | — | — | — | — | — |
| 2013–14 | University of Minnesota | B1G | 41 | 9 | 24 | 33 | 18 | — | — | — | — | — |
| 2014–15 | University of Minnesota | B1G | 39 | 6 | 36 | 42 | 44 | — | — | — | — | — |
| 2015–16 | Iowa Wild | AHL | 45 | 5 | 18 | 23 | 10 | — | — | — | — | — |
| 2015–16 | Minnesota Wild | NHL | 29 | 1 | 6 | 7 | 8 | — | — | — | — | — |
| 2016–17 | Minnesota Wild | NHL | 17 | 1 | 0 | 1 | 2 | — | — | — | — | — |
| 2016–17 | Iowa Wild | AHL | 57 | 5 | 25 | 30 | 48 | — | — | — | — | — |
| 2017–18 | Minnesota Wild | NHL | 38 | 2 | 8 | 10 | 18 | — | — | — | — | — |
| 2017–18 | Iowa Wild | AHL | 1 | 1 | 0 | 1 | 2 | — | — | — | — | — |
| 2017–18 | Montreal Canadiens | NHL | 19 | 0 | 8 | 8 | 8 | — | — | — | — | — |
| 2018–19 | Montreal Canadiens | NHL | 57 | 3 | 8 | 11 | 16 | — | — | — | — | — |
| 2019–20 | Montreal Canadiens | NHL | 14 | 0 | 4 | 4 | 6 | — | — | — | — | — |
| 2019–20 | Ottawa Senators | NHL | 30 | 1 | 11 | 12 | 18 | — | — | — | — | — |
| 2020–21 | Ottawa Senators | NHL | 40 | 0 | 19 | 19 | 18 | — | — | — | — | — |
| 2020–21 | Boston Bruins | NHL | 15 | 0 | 8 | 8 | 4 | 11 | 0 | 4 | 4 | 8 |
| 2021–22 | Boston Bruins | NHL | 70 | 4 | 13 | 17 | 32 | 5 | 0 | 0 | 0 | 2 |
| 2022–23 | Boston Bruins | NHL | 10 | 0 | 1 | 1 | 2 | — | — | — | — | — |
| 2022–23 | Providence Bruins | AHL | 36 | 7 | 19 | 26 | 34 | 1 | 0 | 0 | 0 | 0 |
| 2023–24 | Florida Panthers | NHL | 2 | 0 | 0 | 0 | 2 | — | — | — | — | — |
| 2023–24 | New York Islanders | NHL | 59 | 6 | 18 | 24 | 28 | 5 | 1 | 1 | 2 | 0 |
| 2024–25 | New York Islanders | NHL | 18 | 0 | 2 | 2 | 2 | — | — | — | — | — |
| 2025–26 | Carolina Hurricanes | NHL | 42 | 1 | 8 | 9 | 26 | 2 | 0 | 2 | 2 | 2 |
| 2026–27 | Carolina Hurricanes | NHL | 8 | 0 | 2 | 2 | 2 | — | — | — | — | — |
| NHL totals | | | 468 | 19 | 116 | 135 | 192 | 23 | 1 | 7 | 8 | 12 |

=== International ===
| Year | Team | Event | Result | GP | G | A | Pts | PIM |
|---|---|---|---|---|---|---|---|---|
| 2013 | United States | WJC | 1st place, gold medalist(s) | 7 | 1 | 2 | 3 | 4 |
| 2015 | United States | WC | 3rd place, bronze medalist(s) | 10 | 0 | 1 | 1 | 0 |
| Junior totals | | | | 7 | 1 | 2 | 3 | 4 |
| Senior totals | | | | 10 | 0 | 1 | 1 | 0 |

== Awards and honors ==
| Award | Year | Ref |
College
| Big Ten Defensive Player of the Year | 2014, 2015 | |
| All-Big Ten First Team | 2014, 2015 | |
| AHCA West First-Team All-American | 2014, 2015 | |
NHL
| Stanley Cup champion | 2026 | |

Awards and achievements
| Preceded by Award created | Big Ten Defensive Player of the Year; 2013–14, 2014–15 | Succeeded by Zach Werenski |
