= Big Ten Men's Ice Hockey Defensive Player of the Year =

Big Ten Defensive Player of the Year
- Sport: Ice hockey
- Awarded for: The Defensive Player of the Year in the Big Ten

History
- First award: 2014
- Most recent: Matt Basgall

The Big Ten Defensive Player of the Year is an annual award given out at the conclusion of the Big Ten regular season to the best defensive player in the conference as voted by a media panel and the head coaches of each team who is not a goaltender.

The Defensive Player of the Year was first awarded in 2014.

== Award winners ==
Year	Winner	Position	School
2013–14	Mike Reilly	Defenceman	Minnesota
2014–15	Mike Reilly	Defenceman	Minnesota
2015–16	Zach Werenski	Defenceman	Michigan
2016–17	Jake Bischoff	Defenceman	Minnesota
2017–18	Trevor Hamilton	Defenceman	Penn State
2018–19	Sasha Larocque	Defenceman	Ohio State
2019–20	Cole Hults	Defenceman	Penn State
2020–21	Cam York	Defenceman	Michigan
2021–22	Brock Faber	Defenceman	Minnesota
2022–23	Brock Faber	Defenceman	Minnesota
2023–24	Artyom Levshunov	Defenceman	Michigan State
2024–25	Sam Rinzel	Defenceman	Minnesota
2025–26	Matt Basgall	Defenceman	Michigan State

=== Winners by school ===
School	Winners
Minnesota	6
Michigan	2
Michigan State	2
Penn State	2
Ohio State	1

=== Winners by position ===
Position	Winners
Center	0
Right wing	0
Left wing	0
Forward	0
Defenceman	12
