= Zach Werenski =

American ice hockey player (born 1997)

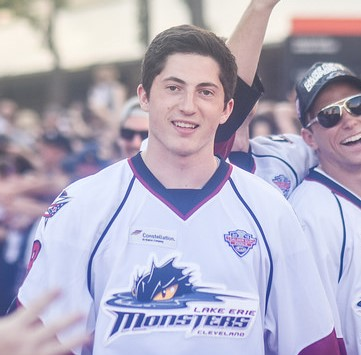
- Werenski with the Lake Erie Monsters in 2016
- Born: July 19, 1997 (age 29) Grosse Pointe, Michigan, U.S.
- Height: 6 ft 2 in (188 cm)
- Weight: 214 lb (97 kg; 15 st 4 lb)
- Position: Defense
- Shoots: Left
- NHL team: Columbus Blue Jackets
- National team: United States
- NHL draft: 8th overall, 2015; Columbus Blue Jackets
- Playing career: 2016–present

Zachary Kenneth Werenski (born July 19, 1997) is an American professional ice hockey player who is a defenseman and alternate captain for the Columbus Blue Jackets of the National Hockey League (NHL). Drafted eighth overall by Columbus in the 2015 NHL entry draft, Werenski has become one of the most accomplished players in franchise history. In 2026, he won the James Norris Memorial Trophy as the NHL's top defenseman. Werenski was co-recipient in June 2026 of the Excellence in Sports Award from the National Polish-American Sports Hall of Fame in Troy, Michigan.

Following his draft selection, Werenski joined the Lake Erie Monsters and helped lead them to the 2016 Calder Cup championship. He made his NHL debut later that year and was named a finalist for the Calder Memorial Trophy as the league's best rookie in 2017. Over the following decade, Werenski established himself as one of the league's premier offensive defensemen, earning multiple NHL All-Star selections and becoming the Columbus Blue Jackets' all-time leader in assists, points, and goals among defensemen.

Internationally, Werenski represented the United States at the 2015 and 2016 World Junior Championships. In the 2025 World Championship, he helped the United States capture its first gold medal in the World Championship since 1933 and was named the tournament's best defenseman. At the 2026 Winter Olympics, he assisted on Jack Hughes' overtime winner against Canada, helping the United States win its first gold medal in the Winter Olympics since 1980.

== Playing career ==
=== Junior ===
Werenski played in the 2009 Quebec International Pee-Wee Hockey Tournament with the Detroit Belle Tire minor ice hockey team. He later trained with the USA Hockey National Team Development Program during the 2013–14 season. He finished second among team defensemen in scoring with seven goals and 20 assists in 47 games, despite missing time in November due to injury.

=== College ===
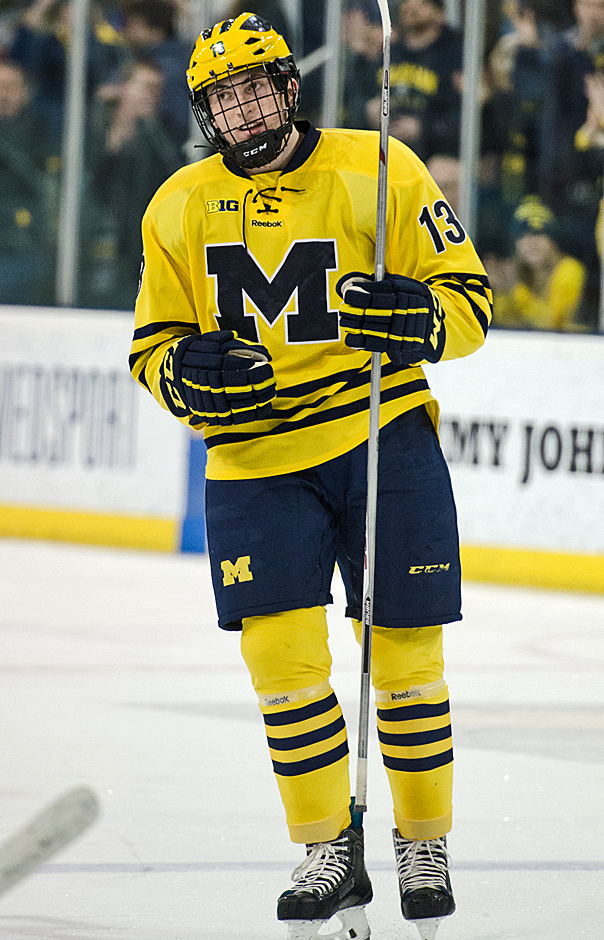
Werenski playing for the University of Michigan Wolverines in February 2015.

During his freshman season, at the University of Michigan, Werenski recorded nine goals and 16 assists. Following an outstanding rookie season, Werenski was named to both the 2014–15 Big Ten All-Freshman Team and the All-Big Ten First Team. Werenski's CHL rights were owned by the London Knights of the Ontario Hockey League. He was drafted by them in the 2013 OHL Priority Selection.

Following an outstanding season with the Wolverines, Werenski was named the Big Ten Conference Defensive Player of the Year and was named to the All-Big Ten First Team. Werenski was the No. 1 scoring defenseman in the Big Ten and was second in the nation among blueliners in points with a career-best 11 goals and 25 assists in 36 games. His six power-play goals put him No. 2 in the nation among defensemen. He had 51 blocked shots on the season and became the 18th defenseman in Michigan history to record 10 goals in a single season and the first since Jacob Trouba scored 12 goals in 2012–13 season. He was also named an AHCA First Team All-American.

During the 2016 Big Ten Men's Ice Hockey Tournament, Werenski and Kyle Connor tied the record for most assists in the Big Ten tournament championship game with three assists. Werenski and Connor also tied the record for points in a championship game with four points. He was also named to the Big Ten All-Tournament Team.

=== Professional ===
==== Columbus Blue Jackets ====
On June 26, 2015, Werenski was drafted eighth overall by the Columbus Blue Jackets in the 2015 NHL entry draft.

On March 29, 2016, Werenski signed a three-year, entry-level contract with the Columbus Blue Jackets, beginning with the 2016–17 season. He was signed to an American Hockey League amateur tryout contract with the Lake Erie Monsters, the AHL affiliate of the Columbus Blue Jackets.

He made his professional debut for the Monsters on April 1, 2016. On April 9, he scored his first professional goal, the overtime game-winning goal against Nathan Lieuwen of the Rochester Americans. During the 2016 Calder Cup playoffs, Werenski recorded five goals and nine assists, to help lead the Monsters to their first Calder Cup championship.

On October 13, 2016, Werenski made his debut for the Blue Jackets in the season opening-game and scored his first NHL point with an assist. On October 15, 2016, in his second NHL game, Werenski scored his first goal against Martin Jones of the San Jose Sharks. Werenski was named the NHL's Rookie of the Month for November 2016. Through 14 games that November, Werenski scored three goals and seven assists.

On March 10, 2017, Werenski set the record for the most points scored by any Blue Jackets rookie in franchise history beating the previous record holder, Rick Nash, by 8 points.

Werenski was injured in Game 3 of the First Round of the 2017 playoffs against the Pittsburgh Penguins when a puck on a shot from Phil Kessel rode up the shaft of his stick and hit him in the face. He received stitches and a black eye but returned to the game in the third period only to leave again when his eye closed over. He was not able to play for the remainder of the playoffs.

Werenski was voted third in the Calder Memorial Trophy voting, an award given annually to the best rookie in the league. The award eventually went to Toronto Maple Leafs Auston Matthews.

On January 26, 2018, Werenski was called to replace fellow defensemen Seth Jones at the 2018 NHL All-Star Game. At the conclusion of the season, Werenski tied with Jones for most goals by a Blue Jackets defensemen in a season, with 16. After the Blue Jackets were eliminated from the 2018 Stanley Cup playoffs, Werenski revealed he had been playing with an undisclosed shoulder injury that had never healed in October. During the post season, Werenski had surgery on his shoulder and was expected to miss 5–6 months.

On September 9, 2019, the Blue Jackets signed Werenski to a three-year, $15 million contract extension.

On December 31, 2019, Werenski scored a hat-trick in a 4–1 Blue Jackets' win over the Florida Panthers and former goaltender teammate, Sergei Bobrovsky. Werenski finished the shortened 2019–20 season leading the league in goals by defensemen with 20.

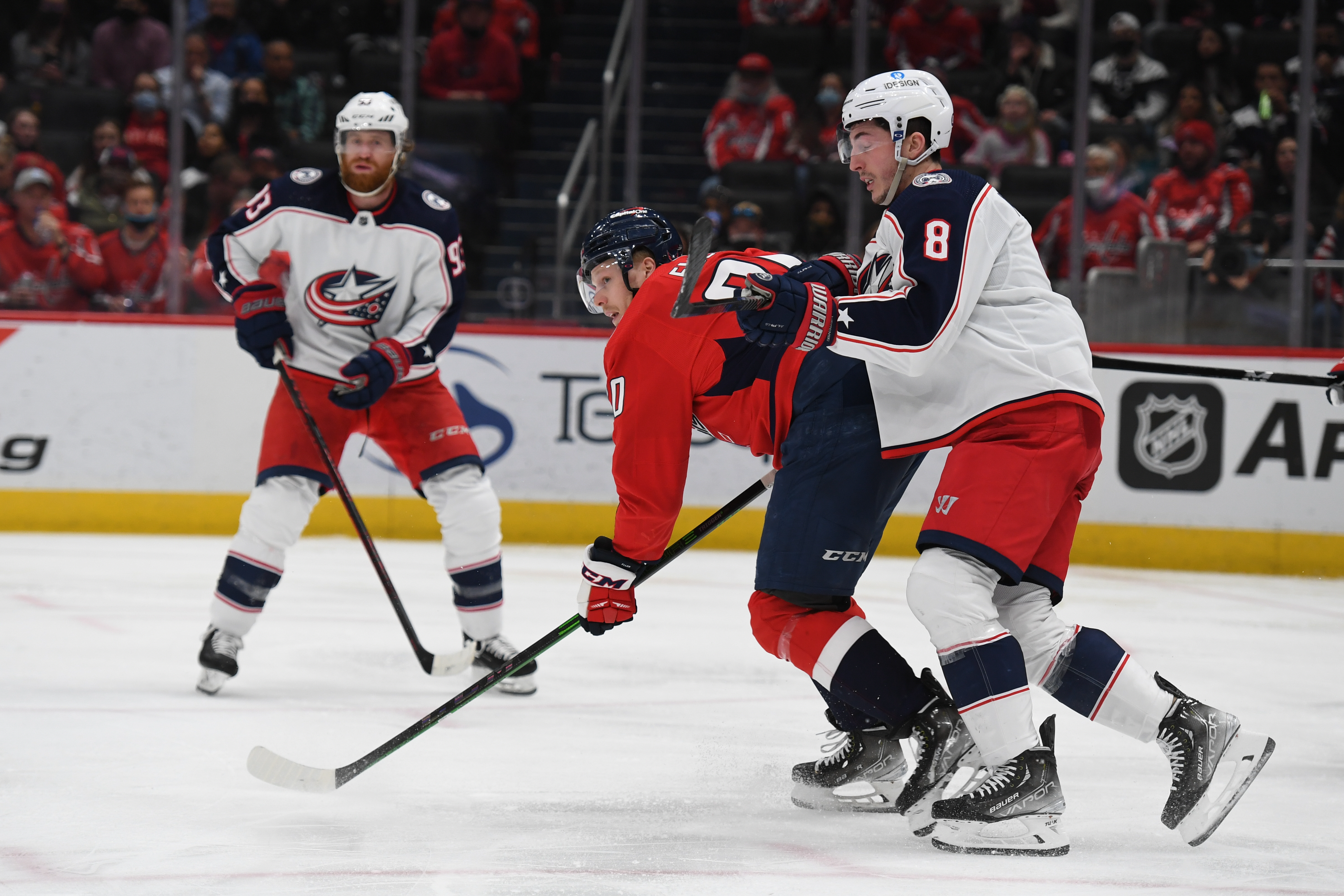
Werenski (right) checking Lars Eller in February 2022.

On April 9, 2021, Werenski was ruled out for the remainder of the 2020–21 season due to a sports hernia.

Werenski signed a six-year, $57.5 million contract extension with the Blue Jackets on July 29, 2021. After re-signing with the team, Werenski was described as becoming "the face of the franchise".

The 2024–25 season proved to be a breakout year for both Werenski and his team, which narrowly missed qualification to the 2025 Stanley Cup playoffs. He finished second in league scoring among defensemen (behind only Cale Makar), and set single-season records for a Blue Jackets defenseman in goals (23), assists (59) and points (82). For the first time in his career he was named a finalist for the James Norris Memorial Trophy, awarded by the Professional Hockey Writers' Association to the league's best defenseman.

Werenski again finished second in defenseman scoring during the 2025–26 season, posting 22 goals and 59 assists in 75 games played, his 81 points being behind only Evan Bouchard of the Edmonton Oilers. Despite this, the Blue Jackets again came up short of playoff qualification. Werenski was ultimately awarded the James Norris Memorial Trophy as the league's top defenseman, becoming the first Blue Jackets player to win the award.

== International play ==
Medal record

Men's ice hockey

Representing the United States

Olympic Games
Gold medal – first place	2026 Milano Cortina	

World Championships
Gold medal – first place	2025 Sweden/Denmark	

4 Nations Face-Off
Runner-up	2025 Canada/United States	

IIHF World Junior Championship
Bronze medal – third place	2016 Finland	

World U-17 Hockey Challenge
Gold medal – first place	2014 Canada	

Werenski represented the United States at the 2014 World U-17 Hockey Challenge, where he recorded one assist in six games, and won a gold medal. Werenski represented the United States at the 2015 World Junior Championships, where he recorded one goal and one assist in five games, and finished in fifth place.

Werenski was named captain of the United States at the 2016 World Junior Championships. He recorded two goals and seven assists in seven games, and won a bronze medal. He was awarded the IIHF Directorate Top Defenseman award, and was named to the tournament All-Star team.

Werenski represented the United States at the 2025 World Championship, where he recorded one goal and five assists in seven games and helped the team win its first gold medal since 1933. He was subsequently named to the All-Star team and named Best Defenseman of the tournament by the directorate.

On January 2, 2026, Werenski was named to the United States' roster for the 2026 Winter Olympics. He assisted on Jack Hughes' game-winning goal in overtime against Canada to clinch the team's first gold medal since 1980. Amid the backlash faced by the men's team regarding the inclusion of FBI director Kash Patel during their gold medal celebrations, and President Trump's comments of being impeached if he did not invite the U.S. women's team to the White House, Werenski was among the majority who visited the White House and attended the State of the Union.

== Personal life ==
Werenski is of Polish descent. Werenski married his girlfriend, Odette Peters, on July 26, 2025. Werenski and his wife have one son.

== Career statistics ==
=== Regular season and playoffs ===
			Regular season					Playoffs
Season	Team	League	GP	G	A	Pts	PIM	GP	G	A	Pts	PIM
2013–14	U.S. NTDP Juniors	USHL	35	6	13	19	17	—	—	—	—	—
2013–14	U.S. NTDP U17	USDP	47	7	24	31	42	—	—	—	—	—
2013–14	U.S. NTDP U18	USDP	4	1	0	1	0	—	—	—	—	—
2014–15	University of Michigan	B1G	35	9	16	25	8	—	—	—	—	—
2015–16	University of Michigan	B1G	36	11	25	36	20	—	—	—	—	—
2015–16	Lake Erie Monsters	AHL	7	1	0	1	0	17	5	9	14	2
2016–17	Columbus Blue Jackets	NHL	78	11	36	47	14	3	1	0	1	0
2017–18	Columbus Blue Jackets	NHL	77	16	21	37	16	6	1	2	3	2
2018–19	Columbus Blue Jackets	NHL	82	11	33	44	18	10	1	5	6	9
2019–20	Columbus Blue Jackets	NHL	63	20	21	41	10	10	1	2	3	4
2020–21	Columbus Blue Jackets	NHL	35	7	13	20	13	—	—	—	—	—
2021–22	Columbus Blue Jackets	NHL	68	11	37	48	22	—	—	—	—	—
2022–23	Columbus Blue Jackets	NHL	13	3	5	8	0	—	—	—	—	—
2023–24	Columbus Blue Jackets	NHL	70	11	46	57	22	—	—	—	—	—
2024–25	Columbus Blue Jackets	NHL	81	23	59	82	31	—	—	—	—	—
2025–26	Columbus Blue Jackets	NHL	75	22	59	81	18	—	—	—	—	—
NHL totals			642	135	330	465	164	29	4	9	13	15

=== International ===
Year	Team	Event	Result	GP	G	A	Pts	PIM
2014	United States	U17	1st place, gold medalist(s)	6	0	1	1	0
2015	United States	WJC	5th	5	1	1	2	2
2016	United States	WJC	3rd place, bronze medalist(s)	7	2	7	9	4
2019	United States	WC	7th	2	0	0	0	0
2024	United States	WC	5th	8	2	5	7	8
2025	United States	4NF	2nd	4	0	6	6	2
2025	United States	WC	1st place, gold medalist(s)	7	1	5	6	2
2026	United States	OG	1st place, gold medalist(s)	6	1	5	6	4
Junior totals				18	3	9	12	6
Senior totals				27	4	21	25	14

== Awards and honors ==
Awards	Year	Ref
College
All-Big Ten Freshman Team	2015	
All-Big Ten First Team	2015	
Big Ten Defensive Player of the Year	2016	
All-Big Ten First Team	2016	
AHCA West First-Team All-American	2016	
Big Ten All-Tournament Team	2016	
AHL
Calder Cup champion	2016	
NHL
Rookie of the month (November)	2016	
NHL All-Star Game	2018, 2022	
NHL First All-Star Team	2025, 2026	
James Norris Memorial Trophy	2026	
International
World Junior Championships Best Defenseman	2016	
World Junior Championships All-Star team	2016	
World Championship Best Defender	2025	
World Championship All-Star team	2025	

Awards and achievements
Preceded by Sonny Milano	Columbus Blue Jackets first-round draft pick 2015	Succeeded by Gabriel Carlsson
Preceded by Mike Reilly	Big Ten Defensive Player of the Year; 2015–16	Succeeded by Jake Bischoff
Preceded by Cale Makar	James Norris Memorial Trophy winner 2026	Succeeded by Incumbent
