= Jean-François Bérubé =

Canadian ice hockey player (born 1991)

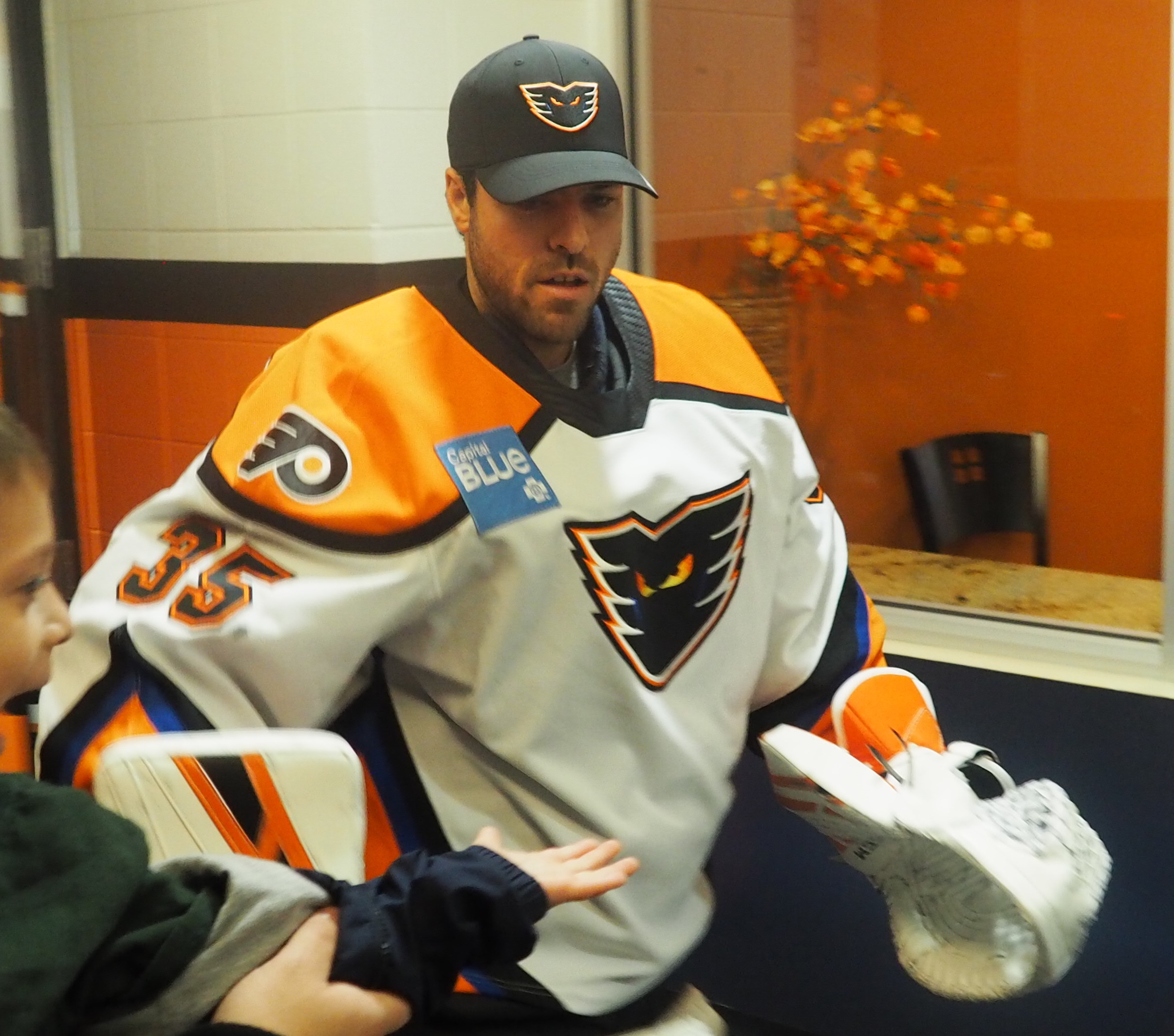
- Bérubé with the Lehigh Valley Phantoms in 2019
- Born: July 13, 1991 (age 35) Repentigny, Quebec, Canada
- Height: 6 ft 1 in (185 cm)
- Weight: 177 lb (80 kg; 12 st 9 lb)
- Position: Goaltender
- Caught: Left
- Played for: New York Islanders; Chicago Blackhawks; Columbus Blue Jackets
- NHL draft: 95th overall, 2009; Los Angeles Kings
- Playing career: 2010–2023

Jean-François "J-F" Bérubé (born July 13, 1991) is a Canadian former professional ice hockey goaltender. He was selected by the Los Angeles Kings in the fourth round (95th pick overall) of the 2009 NHL entry draft.

== Playing career ==
=== Amateur ===
As a youth, Bérubé played in the 2004 Quebec International Pee-Wee Hockey Tournament with a minor ice hockey team from the Mille-Îles area of Laval, Quebec.

Prior to turning professional, Bérubé played major junior hockey in the Quebec Major Junior Hockey League with the Montreal Junior Hockey Club.

=== Professional ===
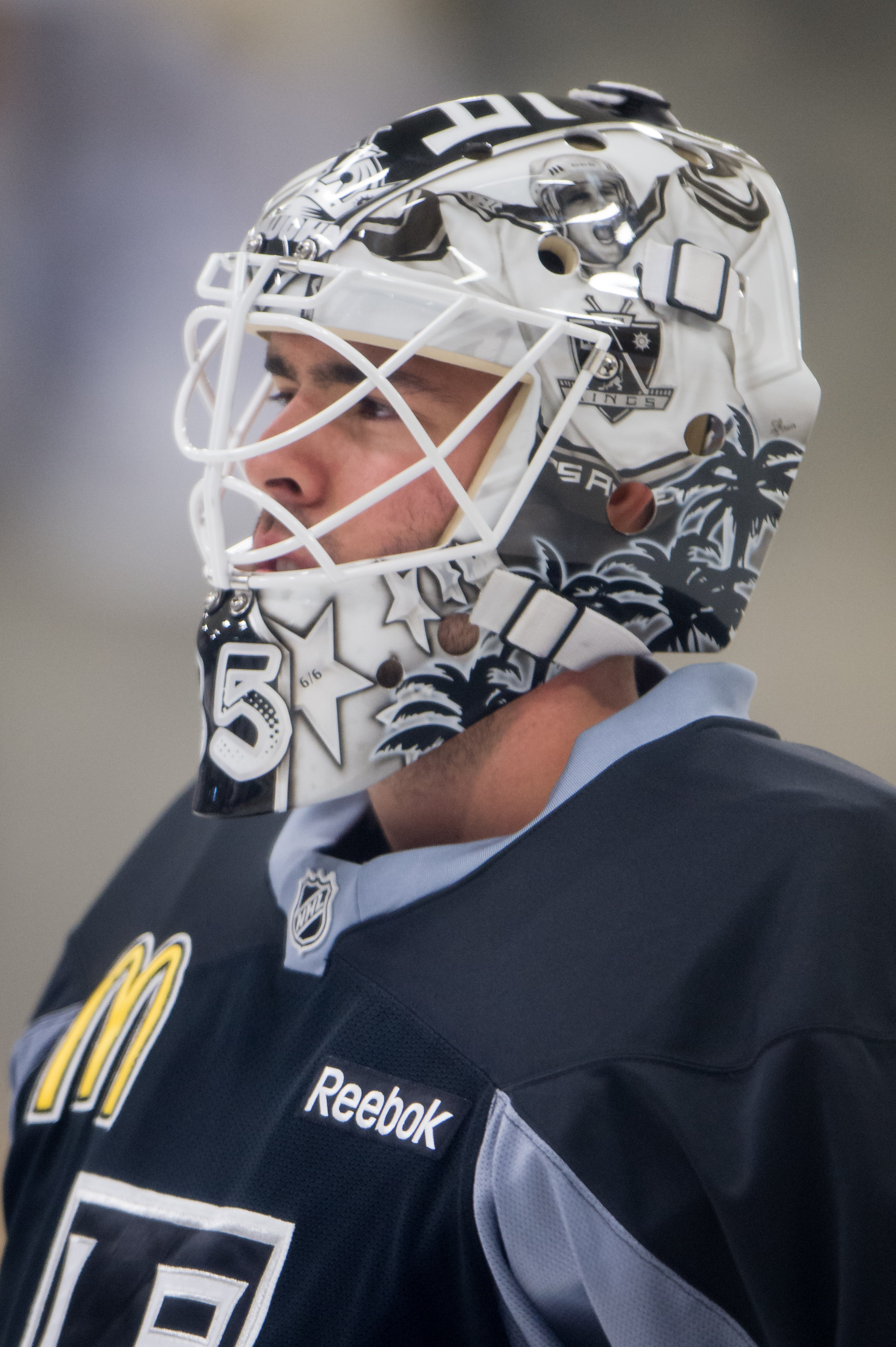
Jean-François Bérubé at the Los Angeles Kings prospect camp on July 10, 2013.

On May 24, 2011, the Los Angeles Kings signed Bérubé to a three-year, entry-level contract. He played for the Kings' AHL affiliate, the Manchester Monarchs, as their starting goaltender. On October 6, 2015, he was waived by the Kings due to Jhonas Enroth being chosen as the Kings' back-up for the season.

On October 6, 2015, the New York Islanders claimed Bérubé off waivers. On October 10, 2015, Bérubé made his NHL debut against the Chicago Blackhawks, stopping 30 of 34 shots as the Islanders lost 4–1.

Bérubé opened the 2016–17 season with the Islanders, behind Jaroslav Halák and Thomas Greiss; the Islanders waived Halák in December 2016, making Bérubé the Islanders full-time backup. After only posting only 3 wins in 14 games, Halak was later recalled.

As an impending group VI free agent after his two-year stint with the Islanders, Bérubé was selected by the Vegas Golden Knights in the 2017 NHL Expansion Draft on June 21, 2017. His selection was based upon a trade between the clubs' in which the Islanders sent a first-round pick in 2017, second-round pick in 2019, prospect Jake Bischoff and the contract of long term injured player, Mikhail Grabovski.

On July 1, Bérubé signed a two-year free agent contract with the Chicago Blackhawks, worth a total of $1.5 million. Bérubé started the season in the American Hockey League with the Rockford Ice Hogs, where he posted a 7–8 record with a 2.37 GAA. He was recalled to Chicago on February 15, 2018, and made his debut on February 23 in a 3−1 win over the San Jose Sharks. Bérubé finished the season with 3–6–1 record in 10 starts for the Blackhawks, with a 3.78 GAA and .894 save percentage.

On June 27, 2018, Bérubé was traded by the Blackhawks to the Columbus Blue Jackets in exchange for Jordan Schroeder.

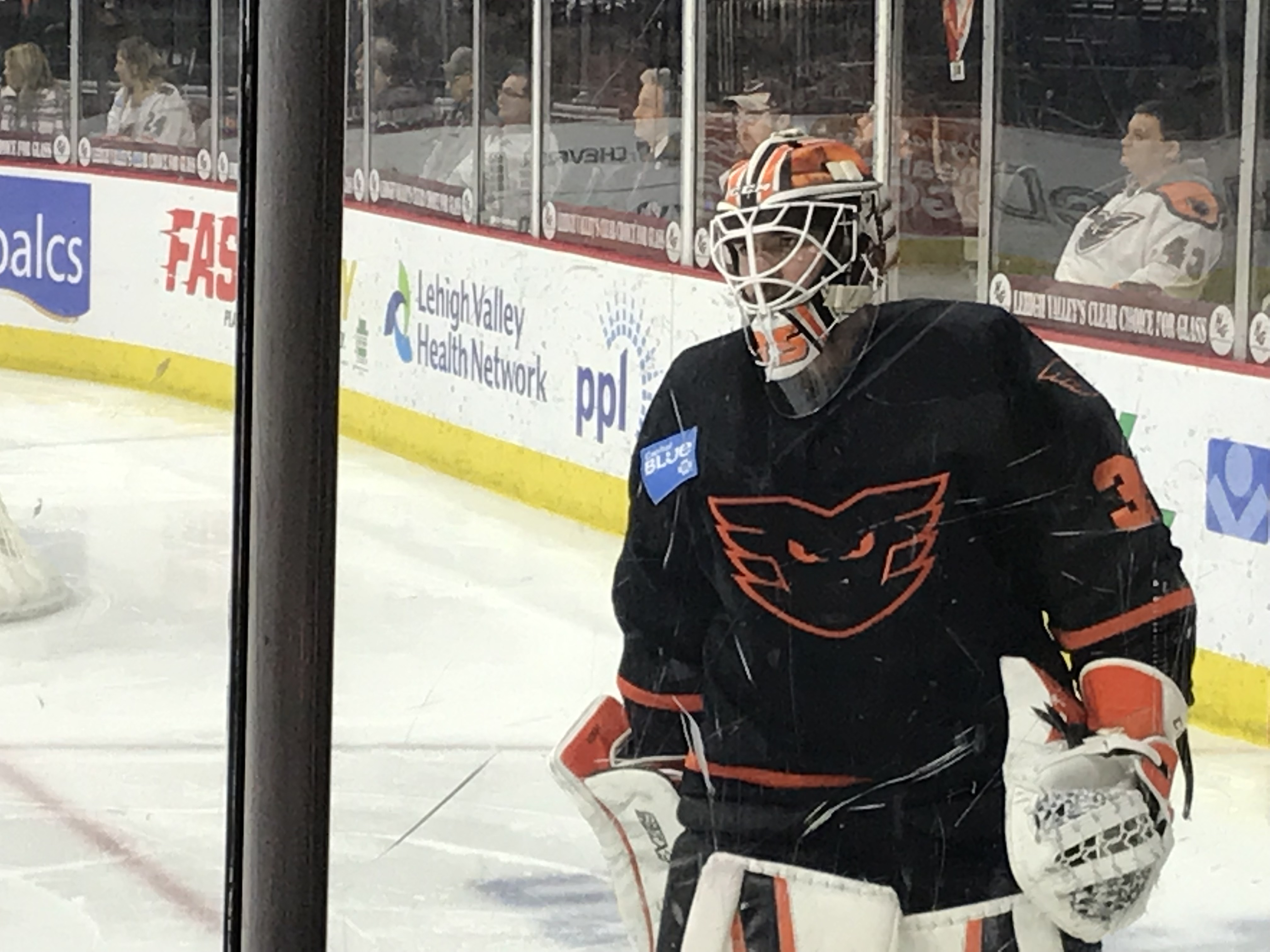
Jean-François Bérubé with the Lehigh Valley Phantoms on December 14, 2019.

On July 1, 2019, Bérubé left the Blue Jackets as a free agent to sign a one-year, two-way contract with the Philadelphia Flyers. After attending the Flyers training camp, Bérubé was assigned to AHL affiliate, the Lehigh Valley Phantoms for the 2019–20 season. He appeared in 29 games with the Phantoms, posting a 12–11–4 record, along with three shutouts. With the Flyers opting to increase the roles of their younger prospects, Bérubé was traded to the New York Rangers to join their AHL affiliate, the Hartford Wolf Pack, in exchange for future considerations on February 19, 2020.

On December 31, 2020, Bérubé signed a one-year contract with the Ontario Reign of the AHL.

As a free agent over the following summer, Bérubé was invited to attend the Columbus Blue Jackets training camp in preparation for the 2021–22 season. On October 1, 2021, after making an impression through camp, Bérubé was signed to a one-year, two-way contract with the Blue Jackets. With the Blue Jackets hampered by injuries to their goaltenders, Bérubé added to his NHL experience in appearing in 6 games and collecting 3 wins.

Leaving the Blue Jacket at the conclusion of his contract, Bérubé was familiarly invited on a professional tryout contract to attend the Florida Panthers 2022 training camp. He was later assigned and signed a PTO with AHL affiliate, the Charlotte Checkers, to begin the 2022–23 season. At the NHL trade deadline, Bérubé in order to add depth insurance was signed by the Panthers for the remainder of the season on a one-year, two-way contract on March 3, 2023.

== Career statistics ==
			Regular season									Playoffs
Season	Team	League	GP	W	L	T/OT	MIN	GA	SO	GAA	SV%	GP	W	L	MIN	GA	SO	GAA	SV%
2008–09	Montréal Junior Hockey Club	QMJHL	20	6	7	2	1,059	47	1	2.66	.907	1	0	0	20	1	0	3.00	.967
2009–10	Montréal Junior Hockey Club	QMJHL	45	17	23	0	2,393	121	1	3.03	.897	7	3	4	449	18	0	2.40	.910
2009–10	Manchester Monarchs	AHL	3	2	1	0	180	11	0	3.67	.855	—	—	—	—	—	—	—	—
2010–11	Montréal Juniors	QMJHL	50	32	7	8	2,935	127	3	2.60	.902	10	6	4	623	29	2	2.79	.901
2011–12	Ontario Reign	ECHL	37	17	13	4	2,091	100	4	2.87	.907	4	1	2	206	11	0	3.20	.878
2012–13	Ontario Reign	ECHL	24	15	6	2	1,418	53	1	2.24	.910	10	6	4	608	21	1	2.07	.914
2012–13	Manchester Monarchs	AHL	2	0	2	0	97	7	0	4.32	.870	—	—	—	—	—	—	—	—
2013–14	Manchester Monarchs	AHL	48	28	17	2	2,790	110	3	2.37	.913	4	1	3	252	7	1	1.67	.936
2014–15	Manchester Monarchs	AHL	52	37	9	4	3,025	110	2	2.18	.913	17	13	3	1,019	39	0	2.30	.898
2015–16	New York Islanders	NHL	7	3	2	1	399	18	0	2.71	.914	1	0	0	5	0	0	0.00	1.000
2015–16	Bridgeport Sound Tigers	AHL	5	4	1	0	287	6	1	1.25	.960	—	—	—	—	—	—	—	—
2016–17	New York Islanders	NHL	14	3	2	2	532	30	0	3.42	.889	—	—	—	—	—	—	—	—
2017–18	Rockford IceHogs	AHL	15	7	8	0	834	33	2	2.37	.920	—	—	—	—	—	—	—	—
2017–18	Chicago Blackhawks	NHL	13	3	6	1	668	42	0	3.78	.894	—	—	—	—	—	—	—	—
2018–19	Cleveland Monsters	AHL	43	21	17	5	2,472	124	0	3.01	.896	—	—	—	—	—	—	—	—
2019–20	Lehigh Valley Phantoms	AHL	29	12	11	4	1,642	70	3	2.56	.906	—	—	—	—	—	—	—	—
2019–20	Hartford Wolf Pack	AHL	7	1	6	0	382	18	0	2.83	.884	—	—	—	—	—	—	—	—
2020–21	Ontario Reign	AHL	19	7	9	2	1,080	61	0	3.39	.885	—	—	—	—	—	—	—	—
2021–22	Cleveland Monsters	AHL	19	4	10	5	1,069	65	1	3.65	.879	—	—	—	—	—	—	—	—
2021–22	Columbus Blue Jackets	NHL	6	3	2	0	306	21	0	4.12	.900	—	—	—	—	—	—	—	—
2022–23	Charlotte Checkers	AHL	19	8	6	3	1,082	58	1	3.22	.885	5	1	1	195	5	1	1.54	.938
NHL totals			40	12	12	4	1,899	111	0	3.51	.898	1	0	0	5	0	0	0.00	1.000

== Awards and honours ==
Award	Year
AHL
Calder Cup	2015
