= Mikhail Grabovski =

German-born Belarusian ice hockey player (born 1984)

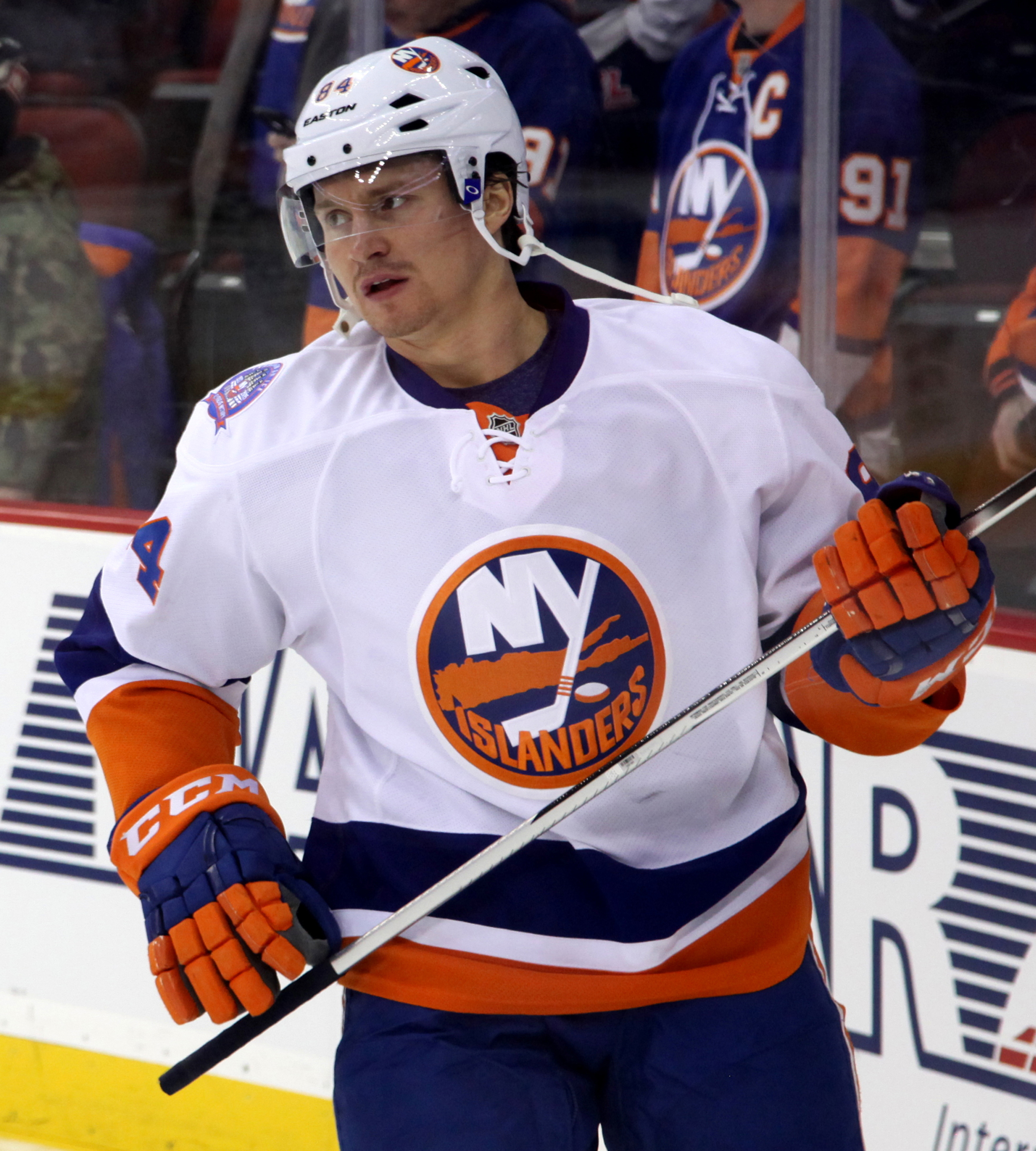
- Grabovski with the New York Islanders in 2015
- Born: 31 January 1984 (age 42) Potsdam, East Germany
- Height: 5 ft 11 in (180 cm)
- Weight: 185 lb (84 kg; 13 st 3 lb)
- Position: Centre
- Shot: Left
- Played for: Neftekhimik Nizhnekamsk; Dynamo Moscow; Montreal Canadiens; Toronto Maple Leafs; CSKA Moscow; Washington Capitals; New York Islanders
- National team: Belarus
- NHL draft: 150th overall, 2004; Montreal Canadiens
- Playing career: 2003–2016

Mikhail Yuryevich Hrabowski (Belarusian: Міхаіл Юр'евiч Грабоўскі; born 31 January 1984), better known as Mikhail Grabovski (Russian: Михаил Грабовский), is a German-born Belarusian professional ice hockey coach and former player. Grabovski serves as head coach for the U16 AAA Markham Waxers. Prior to his coaching career, Grabovski played as a centre in the National Hockey League (NHL) for 10 seasons.

== Early life ==
Grabovski was born in Potsdam, East Germany, where his father, Yury, worked in construction for the Soviet military. The family returned to their native Belarus (then a Soviet Socialist Republic) when he was three years old.

== Playing career ==
Grabovski was drafted by the Montreal Canadiens 150th overall in the 2004 NHL entry draft and played his first NHL game with Montreal on 6 January 2007 against the New York Rangers. He played three games in the NHL before being sent back down to Montreal's American Hockey League (AHL) affiliate, the Hamilton Bulldogs. He helped them win the Calder Cup as AHL champions in the 2006–07 season. Grabovski was called up to play in a few games with the Canadiens during the 2007–08 season but did not see much playing time due to his low position on the team's depth chart. Grabovski recorded his first NHL assist on 20 October 2007, against the Buffalo Sabres and his first goal two days later against the Boston Bruins.

On 3 July 2008, Grabovski was traded to the Toronto Maple Leafs in exchange for the draft rights to Greg Pateryn and a second-round pick in the 2010 NHL entry draft. As a 25-year-old, Grabovski went on to finish his first full season in Toronto with 20 goals and 48 points, leading all NHL Eastern Conference rookies in scoring. The Maple Leafs rewarded Grabovski for his rookie season performance by re-signing him to a three-year, $8.7 million contract carrying an average annual cap hit of $2.9 million. His 58 points in the 2010–11 season was the highest among Maple Leaf centres since Mats Sundin's 78 points in the 2007–08 season. On 6 March 2012, Toronto re-signed Grabovski to a five-year, $27.5 million contract carrying an average annual cap hit of $5.5 million.

On 25 September 2012, due to the 2012–13 NHL lockout that cancelled the first three months of the 2012–13 NHL season, Grabovski signed with CSKA Moscow of the Kontinental Hockey League (KHL). When NHL play returned, following a 2012–13 season in which he recorded only 9 goals and 16 points in 48 games, on 4 July 2013, Grabovski was unexpectedly placed on waivers and listed to be bought-out by the Maple Leafs.

On 23 August 2013, as a free agent following his buy-out, Grabovski signed a one-year, $3 million contract with the Washington Capitals. In his first regular season game with the Capitals on 1 October 2013, Grabovski scored a hat-trick in a 6–4 loss to the Chicago Blackhawks. Grabovski completed the 2013–14 season with a respectable 35 points in 58 games as the Capitals failed to reach the Stanley Cup playoffs for the first time in seven seasons.

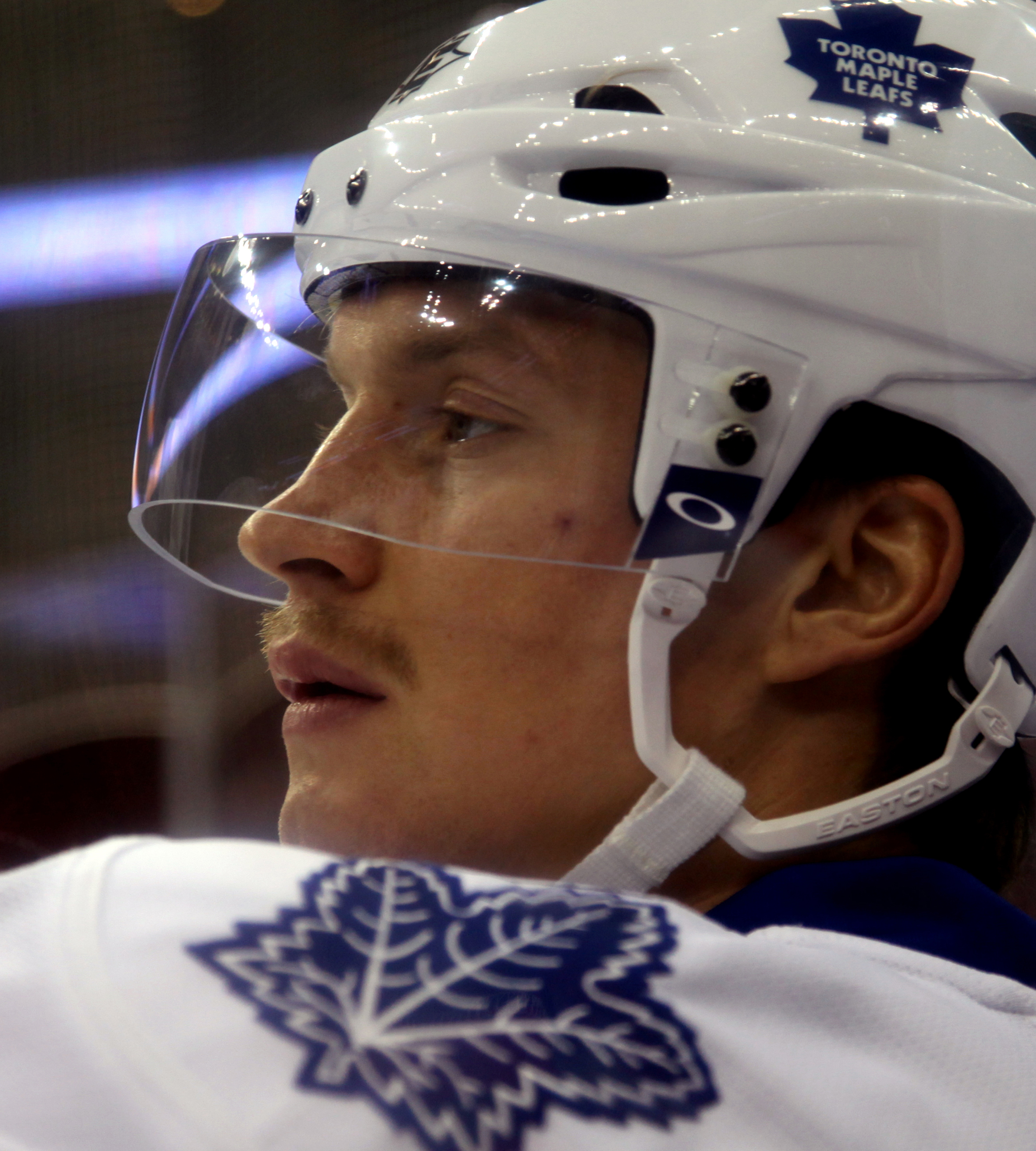
Grabovski with the Toronto Maple Leafs in November 2011

On 2 July 2014, as a free agent, Grabovski signed a four-year, $20 million contract with the New York Islanders. His tenure with the Islanders was largely affected by injury, with a lingering concussion ruling him out for the entirety of the 2016–17 season. Grabovski joined the Islanders along with his Maple Leafs linemate and friend Nikolay Kulemin, making it known to teams during free agency that they wanted to sign together.

On 21 June 2017, the Vegas Golden Knights selected Jean-François Bérubé from the Islanders in the 2017 NHL expansion draft. Bérubé was selected with the condition that Grabovski's final year of contract be traded to the Golden Knights along with a first-round pick in the 2017 NHL entry draft, a second-round pick in the 2019 NHL entry draft and prospect Jake Bischoff. On 14 September 2017, Grabovski attended his physical for the Vegas Golden Knights with the desire to play for the team. However, he did not appear in a single game for the Golden Knights.

In June 2019, Grabovski announced his retirement, stating "I decided for myself that staying at home is not the best option. I need to do something. As a player I can no longer participate in games, so I want to try myself as a coach."

== Coaching career ==
On 15 June 2019, Grabovski was announced as an assistant coach with HC Dinamo Minsk of the KHL.

== Controversies ==
In March 2008, after being a healthy scratch for a game against the Phoenix Coyotes, Grabovski left the Montreal Canadiens and flew to Los Angeles to consult with his agent. The incident prompted his trade to the Toronto Maple Leafs that summer.

In January 2009, Grabovski was involved a scuffle with fellow Belarusian Sergei Kostitsyn during a game between the Maple Leafs and Canadiens. The two had been in a feud since Grabovski's days with the Canadiens. Prior to the 2010 Winter Olympics in Vancouver, the head of the Belarusian national hockey program had to intervene in order for the two players to be able to coexist on the same team.

In 2010 Grabovski was sued for allegedly punching a woman in the face and hospitalizing a man.

Grabovski inadvertently ended Chris Pronger's career when he accidentally hit him in the side of the eye with his stick.

On 9 February 2013, Grabovski was accused of biting Max Pacioretty of the Montreal Canadiens during a scrum along the boards. The NHL conducted a telephone hearing with the players involved, but could not determine conclusively if Grabovski had indeed bitten Pacioretty. However, on 20 May 2013, more than three months later, Grabovski admitted that he did bite Pacioretty, stating in an interview, "He was choking me and I bit him. Don't stick your hands where you shouldn't."

On 3 July 2013, after learning that his contract was being bought-out by the Toronto Maple Leafs, Grabovski was very critical of Toronto's head coach at the time, Randy Carlyle, in an expletive-filled interview with TSN. "I play in the fucking Russian KHL, I make lots of fucking points and what's going to happen? He make me fucking play on the fourth line and he put me in the playoffs on the fourth line and third line again," said Grabovski. "I don't feel any support from this fucking idiot."

In March 2026, Grabovski was arrested and charged with assault after an alleged altercation with another hockey coach in Markham, Ontario.

== International play ==
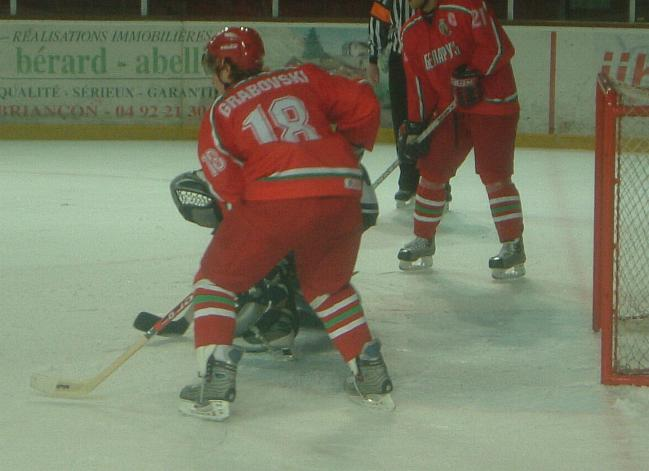
- Grabovski with Team Belarus

Medal record

Representing Belarus

Men's ice hockey

Ice Hockey World Championships
Gold medal – first place	2004 Norway	Division I Group A

World Junior Ice Hockey Championships
Gold medal – first place	2004 France	Division I Group B

Grabovski has represented Belarus in international play. He scored four goals and was the first star in one game (against tournament hosts Austria) in the 2005 IIHF World Championship. Grabovski was selected to play for his country at the 2010 Winter Olympics in Vancouver. However, he did not play due to injury. However, a few months later, he participated in the 2010 IIHF World Championship for Belarus. Grabovski was named captain of Belarus's roster on the eve of 2011 IIHF World Championship in Slovakia. In total, Grabovski has played in seven major international tournaments for Belarus.

== Personal life ==
Grabovski and his wife Kate Van Alstyne had their first child, a daughter, on 30 December 2010. He missed the Maple Leafs' game against the Columbus Blue Jackets that night to be present at the birth. They had their second child, a son, on 6 December 2011. Grabovski and his wife called their son Jaeger after The Rolling Stones frontman Mick Jagger. A third child was born 13 December 2017 named Charlie.

== Career statistics ==
=== Regular season and playoffs ===
			Regular season					Playoffs
Season	Team	League	GP	G	A	Pts	PIM	GP	G	A	Pts	PIM
2000–01	Yunost Minsk	BLR	6	1	3	4	0	—	—	—	—	—
2001–02	Yunost Minsk	BLR	24	9	6	15	16	2	1	1	2	0
2002–03	Yunost Minsk	BLR	42	14	22	36	22	—	—	—	—	—
2002–03	Yunost Minsk II	BLR II	10	16	12	28	2	—	—	—	—	—
2003–04	Neftekhimik Nizhnekamsk	RSL	45	6	11	17	26	5	0	0	0	4
2004–05	Neftekhimik Nizhnekamsk	RSL	60	16	20	36	32	3	2	0	2	2
2004–05	Yunost Minsk	BLR	—	—	—	—	—	5	2	4	6	6
2005–06	Dynamo Moscow	RSL	48	10	17	28	28	4	0	0	0	4
2005–06	Yunost Minsk	BLR	—	—	—	—	—	8	6	8	14	8
2006–07	Hamilton Bulldogs	AHL	66	17	37	54	34	20	4	7	11	21
2006–07	Montreal Canadiens	NHL	3	0	0	0	0	—	—	—	—	—
2007–08	Hamilton Bulldogs	AHL	12	8	12	20	6	—	—	—	—	—
2007–08	Montreal Canadiens	NHL	24	3	6	9	8	—	—	—	—	—
2008–09	Toronto Maple Leafs	NHL	78	20	28	48	92	—	—	—	—	—
2009–10	Toronto Maple Leafs	NHL	59	10	25	35	10	—	—	—	—	—
2010–11	Toronto Maple Leafs	NHL	81	29	29	58	60	—	—	—	—	—
2011–12	Toronto Maple Leafs	NHL	74	23	28	51	51	—	—	—	—	—
2012–13	CSKA Moscow	KHL	29	12	12	24	10	—	—	—	—	—
2012–13	Toronto Maple Leafs	NHL	48	9	7	16	24	7	0	2	2	2
2013–14	Washington Capitals	NHL	58	13	22	35	26	—	—	—	—	—
2014–15	New York Islanders	NHL	51	9	10	19	8	3	0	0	0	0
2015–16	New York Islanders	NHL	58	9	16	25	33	—	—	—	—	—
BLR totals			72	24	31	55	38	15	9	13	22	14
RSL totals			153	32	48	80	86	12	2	0	2	10
NHL totals			534	125	171	296	312	10	0	2	2	2

=== International ===
Year	Team	Event	Result	GP	G	A	Pts	PIM
2002	Belarus	WJC	9th	6	0	1	1	2
2002	Belarus	WJC18	5th	8	2	1	3	2
2003	Belarus	WJC	10th	6	2	0	2	2
2004	Belarus	WJC D1	11th	5	4	5	9	0
2004	Belarus	WC D1	18th	5	2	1	3	8
2005	Belarus	OGQ	DNQ	3	4	3	7	10
2005	Belarus	WC	10th	6	4	1	5	2
2006	Belarus	WC	6th	7	5	4	9	2
2008	Belarus	WC	9th	5	0	3	3	0
2009	Belarus	WC	8th	7	3	6	9	2
2010	Belarus	WC	10th	6	0	3	3	6
2011	Belarus	WC	14th	6	2	2	4	2
2012	Belarus	WC	14th	7	1	3	4	4
2014	Belarus	WC	7th	6	4	4	8	0
Junior totals				25	8	7	15	6
Senior totals				58	25	30	55	36
