= Matt Basgall =

American ice hockey player (born 2002)

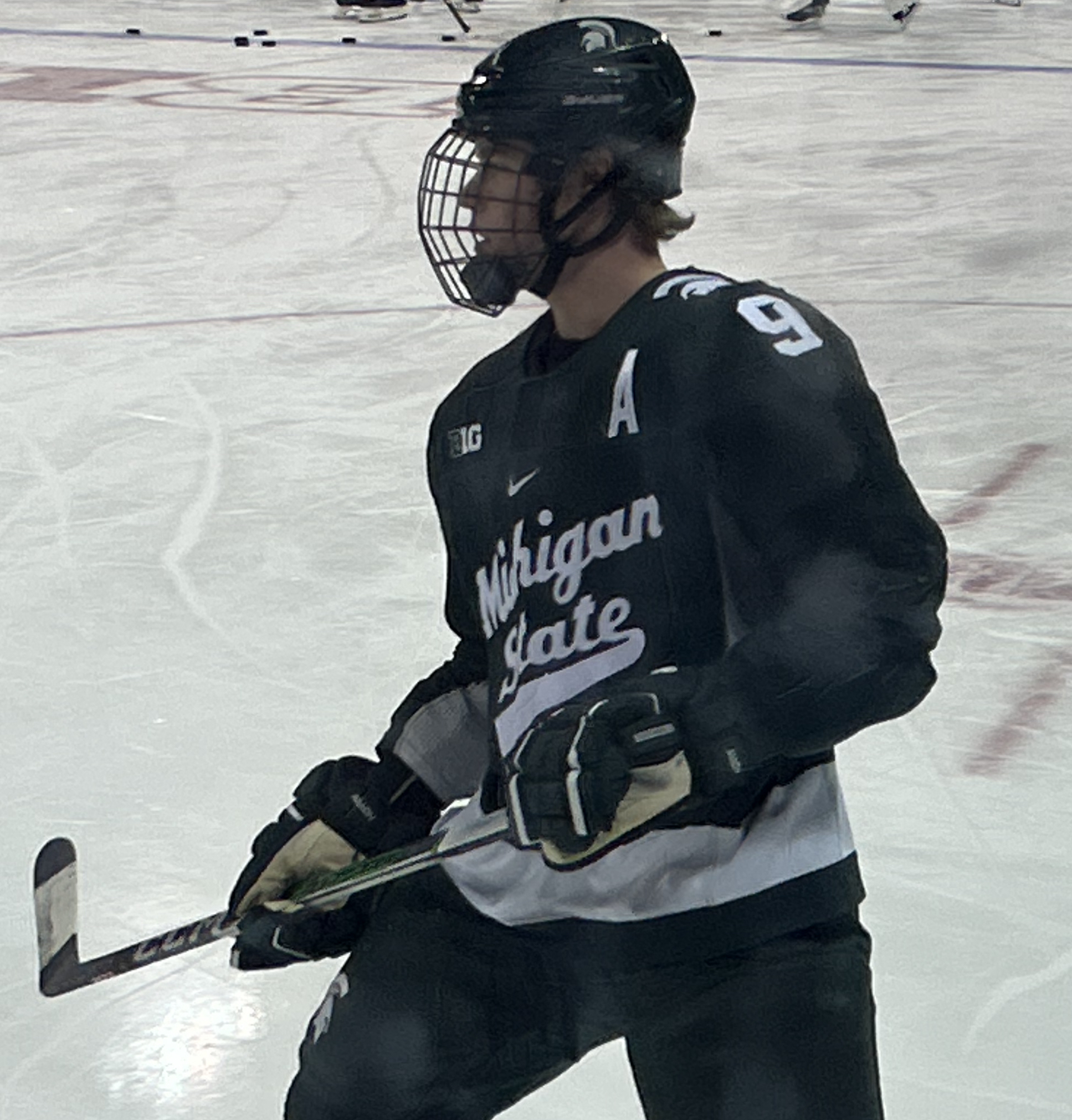
- Basgall with Michigan State in 2024
- Born: August 16, 2002 (age 23) Lake Forest, Illinois, U.S.
- Height: 5 ft 10 in (178 cm)
- Weight: 190 lb (86 kg; 13 st 8 lb)
- Position: Defense
- Shoots: Right
- AHL team: San Diego Gulls
- NHL draft: Undrafted
- Playing career: 2026–present

Matthew Basgall (born August 16, 2002) is an American professional ice hockey defenseman for the San Diego Gulls in the American Hockey League (AHL).

== Playing career ==
=== Junior ===
Basgall began his career with the Omaha Lancers of the United States Hockey League (USHL), where he recorded nine goals and 37 assists in 125 games in four seasons. On February 24, 2022, he was traded to the Tri-City Storm in exchange for Nate Benoit. He finished the 2021–22 season with three goals and 18 assists in 21 regular season games for the Storm, to help them win the Anderson Cup.

=== College ===
Basgall began his collegiate career for Michigan State during the 2022–23 season. During his freshman year he recorded four goals and 13 assists in 38 games. He led the team with 54 blocked shots, and ranked second on the team in scoring among defensemen with 17 points. He scored his first career goal on October 14, 2022, in a game against UMass Lowell. On August 30, 2023, he was named an alternate captain for the 2023–24 season. In his sophomore year, he recorded one goal and 15 assists in 38 games, and led the team with 61 blocked shots.

On August 27, 2024, he was again named an alternate captain for the 2024–25 season. In his junior year, he recorded a career-high six goals and 20 assists in 37 games. He ranked fourth on the team in scoring and led all defensemen. During the 2025 Big Ten men's ice hockey tournament championship game against Ohio State, he blocked a team-high three shots, to help Michigan State win the Big Ten tournament. He was subsequently named to the Big Ten All-Tournament team. Following the season he was named to the All-Big Ten First Team, an AHCA West Second Team All-American, and a finalist for the Big Ten Defensive Player of the Year. After captain the Spartans in his senior season, Basgall embarked on his professional career signing an ATO with the San Diego Gulls to end the 2025–26 season.

=== Professional ===
As an undrafted free agent, Basgall would continue his tenure with the Gulls, the primary affiliate to the Anaheim Ducks, by signing a one-year AHL contract for the 2026–27 season on July 15, 2026.

== Personal life ==
Basgall was born to Barbara and Glenn Basgall, and sisters, Jennifer and Lauren, and a younger brother, Mark.

== Career statistics ==
			Regular season					Playoffs
Season	Team	League	GP	G	A	Pts	PIM	GP	G	A	Pts	PIM
2018–19	Omaha Lancers	USHL	5	0	0	0	0	—	—	—	—	—
2019–20	Omaha Lancers	USHL	46	2	8	10	4	—	—	—	—	—
2020–21	Omaha Lancers	USHL	38	1	10	11	8	2	0	0	0	0
2021–22	Omaha Lancers	USHL	36	6	19	25	8	—	—	—	—	—
2021–22	Tri-City Storm	USHL	21	3	18	21	6	5	0	1	1	0
2022–23	Michigan State University	B1G	38	4	13	17	14	—	—	—	—	—
2023–24	Michigan State University	B1G	38	1	15	16	2	—	—	—	—	—
2024–25	Michigan State University	B1G	37	6	20	26	8	—	—	—	—	—
2025–26	Michigan State University	B1G	37	4	16	20	4	—	—	—	—	—
2025–26	San Diego Gulls	AHL	4	1	1	2	0	2	0	0	0	6
AHL totals			4	1	1	2	0	2	0	0	0	6

== Awards and honors ==
Award	Year
College
All-Big Ten First Team	2025, 2026
Big Ten All-Tournament Team	2025
AHCA West Second Team All-American	2025
Big Ten Defensive Player of the Year	2026

Awards and achievements
Preceded by Sam Rinzel	Big Ten Defensive Player of the Year; 2025–26	Succeeded by Incumbent
