= Deaths in November 2021 =

The following is a list of notable deaths in November 2021.

Entries for each day are listed alphabetically by surname. A typical entry lists information in the following sequence:

- Name, age, country of citizenship at birth, subsequent country of citizenship (if applicable), reason for notability, cause of death (if known), and reference.

== November 2021 ==
=== 1 ===
- Brian Adair, 86, Scottish sports administrator, president (1983) and chair (1986) of the Scottish Cricket Union.
- Gulraiz Akhtar, 78, Pakistani field hockey player, Olympic champion (1968).
- Giacomo Babini, 92, Italian Roman Catholic prelate, bishop of Pitigliano-Sovana-Orbetello (1991–1996) and Grosseto (1996–2001).
- Aaron Beck, 100, American psychiatrist (cognitive therapy, Beck Depression Inventory), co-founder of the Beck Institute for Cognitive Behavior Therapy.
- Emmett Chapman, 85, American jazz musician, inventor of the Chapman Stick.
- Ezio Cini, 76, Italian Olympic sport shooter.
- Pundlik Hari Danve, 95, Indian politician, MP (1977–1979, 1989–1991).
- Semra Dinçer, 56, Turkish actress (Elephants and Grass, Kavak Yelleri, Kuzey Güney), lung cancer.
- Hugo Dittfach, 85, German-born Canadian jockey.
- Temirkhan Dosmukhanbetov, 72, Kazakhstani politician, mayor of Astana (2003–2004) and MP (since 2012). (death announced on this date)
- Nelson Freire, 77, Brazilian classical pianist.
- Tori Geib, 35, American cancer patient advocate.
- Jonathan Gledhill, 72, English Anglican prelate, bishop of Southampton (1996–2003) and Lichfield (2003–2015).
- Gilberto Grácio, 85, Portuguese guitar maker.
- Minoru Hara, 91, Japanese writer and Indologist.
- Alan Igglesden, 57, English cricketer (Kent, Western Province, national team), brain cancer.
- Yuri Klepikov, 86, Russian screenwriter (The Ascent, The Seventh Companion) and actor (The Beginning).
- Denis Lapalme, 62, Canadian Paralympic swimmer (1976) and actor.
- Jessie Lichauco, 109, Cuban-born American-Filipino philanthropist.
- Princess Marie Alix of Schaumburg-Lippe, 98, German noblewoman, Duchess of Schleswig-Holstein (1965–1980).
- Pat Martino, 77, American jazz guitarist and composer.
- Poerio Mascella, 71, Italian footballer (Varese, Ternana, Pistoiese).
- Mildred Mattingly, 94, American politician.
- Bruno Moretti, 80, Australian athlete, Paralympic champion (1968).
- Seeco Patterson, 90, Cuban-born Jamaican percussionist (Bob Marley and the Wailers).
- Maurice Price, 83, Irish football player and coach.
- Millie Bown Russell, 95, American health educator and academic administrator.
- Arvinder Singh Lovely, 56, Indian politician, Delhi MLA (2008–2013), heart attack.
- Lawrence Donald Soens, 95, American Roman Catholic prelate, bishop of Sioux City (1983–1998).
- William R. Spaulding, 97, American politician, member of the Council of the District of Columbia (1975–1987).
- Bill Stern, 95, American botanist.

=== 2 ===
- John Aiken, 89, American ice hockey player (Montreal Canadiens).
- José Álvarez, 95, United States Virgin Islands Olympic sport shooter.
- Cyrus Amouzgar, 87, Iranian politician, acting minister of intelligence and tourism (1978–1979).
- Molana Azizullah Bohio, 75, Pakistani Islamic scholar and politician.
- Jane Brown Grimes, 80, American Hall of Fame tennis executive, president of the USTA (2007–2008).
- Rabiranjan Chattopadhyay, 81, Indian politician, West Bengal MLA (since 2011).
- Flora D. Crittenden, 97, American educator and politician, member of the Virginia House of Delegates (1993–2004).
- Ali Fadhul, 81, Ugandan military officer and convicted war criminal, chief of army staff (1979), complications from diabetes.
- Sabah Fakhri, 88, Syrian tenor singer.
- Des Ferguson, 91, Irish Gaelic footballer (Gaeil Colmcille, Dublin).
- Federico Granja Ricalde, 79, Mexican politician, three-term deputy, mayor of Mérida (1976–1978), and governor of Yucatán (1994–1995).
- Bettina Grossman, 94, American conceptual artist.
- Kenneth Holmes, 86, British molecular biologist.
- Irene Lalji, Surinamese lawyer and television presenter, COVID-19.
- Tomas Leandersson, 55, Swedish Hall of Fame ten-pin bowler.
- Clive Lee, 82, British design engineer (Exeter hip).
- Carlos Lélis, 90, Portuguese politician, MP.
- Li Zehou, 91, Chinese philosopher and political activist.
- Paul A. Libby, 100, American fluid dynamicist and academic.
- Tshitenge Lubabu, 66, Congolese journalist and writer.
- Sir Alistair MacFarlane, 90, Scottish electrical engineer and academic administrator, principal of Heriot-Watt University (1989–1996).
- John Marshall, 76, American football player (San Francisco 49ers, Seattle Seahawks, Green Bay Packers).
- Tom Matte, 82, American football player (Baltimore Colts), Super Bowl champion (1971).
- Alf Mayer, 83, Canadian Olympic sports shooter (1968, 1972).
- Gerard V. Middleton, 90, Canadian geologist.
- Dennis Moore, 75, American politician and lawyer, member of the U.S. House of Representatives (1999–2011), cancer.
- Hamdullah Mukhlis, Afghan military officer, bombing.
- Declan Mulligan, 83, Irish-born American rock musician (The Beau Brummels).
- Ed Nickla, 88, American football player (Chicago Bears, Montreal Alouettes, Toronto Argonauts), CFL East All-Star (1962, 1963).
- Hiroshi Ogawa, 72, Japanese politician, governor of Fukuoka Prefecture (2011–2021), lung cancer.
- John Joe O'Hagan, 91, Irish Gaelic footballer (Clonoe O'Rahilly's).
- Alf Patrick, 100, English footballer (York City).
- Jacques Pimpaneau, 87, French sinologist.
- Luciano Piquè, 86, Italian footballer (Udinese, Genoa, Entella).
- Viktor Putyatin, 80, Ukrainian fencer, Olympic silver medalist (1968, 1972).
- Ruby Richman, 87, Canadian Olympic basketball player (1964).
- Mohamed Soukhane, 90, Algerian footballer (Le Havre, national team).
- Neal Smith, 101, American politician, member of the U.S. House of Representatives (1959–1995).
- Dieterich Spahn, 83, German-born American artist.
- Patricija Šulin, 55, Slovenian politician, MEP (2014–2019).
- Alan D. Swain, 97, American engineer.
- Abhay Vakil, 71, Indian billionaire businessman.
- Ernest Wilson, 69, Jamaican reggae singer (The Clarendonians).
- Jakob Wolfensberger, 88, Swiss Olympic archer.

=== 3 ===
- Hassan Al Alfi, 85, Egyptian politician, minister of interior (1993–1997).
- Eileen Anderson, 93, American politician, mayor of Honolulu (1981–1985).
- Bob Baker, 82, British screenwriter (Wallace and Gromit, Doctor Who, K-9).
- François Blank, 90, Swiss Olympic ice hockey player (1952).
- Joanna Bruzdowicz, 78, Polish composer.
- Wilma Chan, 72, American politician, member of the Alameda County Board of Supervisors (1995–2000, since 2011) and the California State Assembly (2000–2006), traffic collision.
- Sam Forse Collins, 93, American politician.
- Georgie Dann, 81, French singer, complications from surgery.
- Anne Emerman, 84, American disability rights activist, pneumonia.
- Pablo Armando Fernández, 91, Cuban poet and novelist.
- Hermann Haverkamp, 79, German Olympic water polo player (1968, 1972).
- Seth G. Huntington, 101, American sculptor.
- Yasuro Kikuchi, 92, Japanese Go player.
- Helga Lindner, 70, German swimmer, Olympic silver medalist (1968).
- Michael Marai, 73, Papua New Guinean Roman Catholic prelate, bishop of Goroka (1988–1994).
- Abdul Muhib Mazumder, 89, Indian politician, Assam MLA (1983–1991, 1996–2001, 2011–2016).
- Víctor Manuel Ortiz, 56, Puerto Rican politician, mayor of Gurabo (2005–2016).
- Jean Pierson, 80, Tunisian-born French engineer.
- Warren Powers, 80, American football player (Oakland Raiders) and coach (Missouri Tigers, Washington State Cougars).
- Andrei Redkous, 64, Russian footballer (Zenit, Torpedo Moscow, Torpedo Vladimir).
- Cecilia Robinson, 97, English cricketer (Kent, national team).
- Boris Sádecký, 24, Slovak ice hockey player (HK Orange 20, HC Slovan Bratislava, Bratislava Capitals), cardiac arrest.
- Sharon Smith Kane, 89, American cartoonist, illustrator and children's author.
- Stanisław Szostecki, 53, Polish Olympic wrestler.
- Tang Yao-ming, 80, Taiwanese military officer, minister of national defense (2002–2004) and chief of the general staff (1999–2002).
- Kurt Thyboe, 81, Danish journalist and sports commentator, pneumonia.
- Eric Franklin Wood, 74, Canadian-American hydrologist, cancer.

=== 4 ===
- Vanessa Angel, 27, Indonesian actress, traffic collision.
- Jim Arnold, 86, American politician.
- Sir Brian Bender, 72, British civil servant.
- Lionel Blair, 92, Canadian-born British actor (The Limping Man, A Hard Day's Night), choreographer and television presenter (Give Us a Clue).
- Vyacheslav Borisov, 66, Russian major general.
- Michel Braun, 91, Luxembourgish Olympic sport shooter.
- Barbara-Rose Collins, 82, American politician, member of the Detroit City Council (1982–1991, 2001–2009) and the U.S. House of Representatives (1991–1997), COVID-19.
- Herman LeRoy Emmet, 78, American photojournalist and visual artist, complications of Parkinson's disease.
- Amela Fetahović, 35, Bosnian footballer (Sarajevo, Spartak Subotica, national team).
- Aaron Feuerstein, 95, American industrialist and philanthropist, CEO of Malden Mills.
- John Flood, 83, English literary scholar.
- Warren B. French, 98, American politician.
- Yutaka Gibbons, 77, Palauan activist.
- Francis Huré, 105, French World War II Resistance member, diplomat, and writer.
- Károly Király, 91, Romanian politician, senator (1990–1992).
- Heorhiy Kryuchkov, 92, Ukrainian politician, deputy (1998–2006).
- Mario Lavista, 78, Mexican composer and writer.
- Amatsia Levkovich, 83, Israeli footballer (Hapoel Tel Aviv, national team).
- June Lindsey, 99, British-Canadian biochemist.
- Ruth Ann Minner, 86, American politician, member of the Delaware House of Representatives (1975–1983) and Senate (1983–1993), governor of Delaware (2001–2009).
- Subrata Mukherjee, 75, Indian politician, West Bengal MLA (1971–1977, 1982–1991, 1996–2006, since 2011) and mayor of Kolkata (2000–2005), heart attack.
- Eugenio Pazzaglia, 72, Italian footballer (Pisa, Civitavecchia, Siena).
- Mike Pitts, 61, American football player (Philadelphia Eagles, Atlanta Falcons, New England Patriots).
- Devwrat Singh, 52, Indian politician, Chhattisgarh MLA (1998–2008, since 2018) and MP (2007–2009), heart attack.
- Thein Aung, 56, Burmese businessman, CFO of Mytel, shot.
- Jack Vitty, 98, English footballer (Workington, Brighton & Hove Albion).
- Ian Wallace, 87, British ornithologist.
- Claude Nelson Warren, 89, American anthropologist.
- Roger Zatkoff, 90, American football player (Green Bay Packers, Detroit Lions).

=== 5 ===
- Charles Brackeen, 81, American jazz saxophonist.
- James A. Brundage, 92, American historian.
- Walter Brune, 95, German architect.
- Charlie Burns, 85, American-born Canadian ice hockey player (Minnesota North Stars, Boston Bruins, Pittsburgh Penguins), world champion (1958).
- A. O. J. Cockshut, 94, British academic and author.
- Bob Dollin, 92, Australian politician, Queensland MLA (1989–1998).
- Russell Ebert, 72, Australian football player (Port Adelaide, North Melbourne) and coach, leukaemia.
- Ryszard Grzegorczyk, 82, Polish footballer (Polonia Bytom, Lens, national team).
- Erich Isaac, 93, German-born Israeli Lehi militant and geographer.
- Mei Jones, 68, Welsh scriptwriter and actor (C'mon Midffîld!).
- Siluyan Kilin, 82, Russian Orthodox Old-Rite prelate, bishop of Novosibirsk (since 2015).
- Robert S. Kiss, 63, American politician, member (1989–2007) and speaker (1997–2007) of the West Virginia House of Delegates, cancer.
- Andris Kolbergs, 82, Latvian writer and screenwriter (Defenders of Riga).
- Silvio Laurenzi, 85, Italian actor (Hot Potato) and costume designer (The Case of the Bloody Iris, Manhunt in the City).
- Norman Macfarlane, Baron Macfarlane of Bearsden, 95, Scottish industrialist and life peer, member of the House of Lords (1991–2016).
- Luigi Maldera, 75, Italian footballer (Monza, Milan, Catanzaro).
- Marília Mendonça, 26, Brazilian singer, Grammy winner (2019), airplane crash.
- Vidadi Muradov, 65, Azerbaijani carpet specialist and academic.
- Palakkeezh Narayanan, 81, Indian writer, academic and political activist.
- Nguon Nhel, 78, Cambodian politician, minister of agriculture (1989–1993) and MP (since 1993).
- Beldina Odenyo Onassis, 31, Kenyan-British musician.
- Dušan Pašek, 36, Slovak ice hockey player (HC Slovan Bratislava, HC Košice, ŠHK 37 Piešťany), suicide by hanging.
- Jerome Schutzer, 91, American politician, member of the New York State Assembly (1961–1965) and Senate (1966).
- Khawaja Muhammad Sharif, 71, Pakistani jurist, justice (1998–2009) and chief justice (2009–2010) of Lahore High Court.
- Flip Stapper, 76, Dutch footballer (FC Twente, AZ Alkmaar).
- Ross Tolleson, 65, American politician, member of the Georgia State Senate (2003–2015).
- Paul Torcello, 67, Italian-born Australian advertising photographer.
- Kinji Yoshimoto, 55, Japanese animator, writer and director (Megazone 23, Plastic Little, Queen's Blade).

=== 6 ===
- Keld Andersen, 75, Danish Olympic handball player (1972), cancer.
- Peter Aykroyd, 65, Canadian comedian (Saturday Night Live) and actor (Coneheads, Nothing but Trouble), sepsis.
- László Bélády, 93, Hungarian-American computer scientist, dementia.
- Maureen Cleave, 87, British journalist, conducted John Lennon's "more popular than Jesus" interview.
- Kambiz Derambakhsh, 79, Iranian graphic designer, COVID-19.
- Edward Fender, 79, Polish Olympic luger (1964).
- Jim Kerray, 85, Scottish footballer (Raith Rovers, Stirling Albion, St Johnstone).
- Geoff Martin, 81, English footballer (Chesterfield, Workington, Grimsby Town).
- Marguerite McNeil, 86, Canadian actress (Trailer Park Boys, My Bloody Valentine, Jumping the Broom).
- Pavol Molnár, 85, Slovak footballer, 1962 FIFA World Cup silver medalist, 1960 European Nations' Cup bronze medalist.
- Angelo Mosca, 84, American Hall of Fame football player (Hamilton Tiger-Cats, Ottawa Rough Riders) and professional wrestler (NWA).
- Shawn Rhoden, 46, Jamaican-American professional bodybuilder, Mr. Olympia (2018), heart attack.
- Raúl Rivero, 75, Cuban poet, cancer.
- Marinko Rokvić, 67, Serbian folk singer, pancreatic cancer.
- Clifford Rose, 92, British actor (Tell Me Lies, Work Is a Four-Letter Word, Pirates of the Caribbean: On Stranger Tides).
- Erich Saling, 96, German gynaecologist, pioneer of maternal–fetal medicine.
- Luíz Antônio dos Santos, 57, Brazilian Olympic long-distance runner (1996), cardiac arrest.
- April Pulley Sayre, 55, American author, metastatic breast cancer.
- Cissé Mariam Kaïdama Sidibé, 73, Malian politician, prime minister (2011–2012).
- Tarak Sinha, 70, Indian cricket coach, lung cancer.
- Harvey White, 83, American football player (Boston Patriots).
- Muamer Zukorlić, 51, Serbian politician and Islamic cleric, member (2016–2020) and vice-president (since 2020) of the National Assembly, co-founder of BANU, heart attack.
- Yukhym Zvyahilsky, 88, Ukrainian politician, mayor of Donetsk (1992–1993), acting prime minister (1993–1994), and deputy (1990–2019), COVID-19.

=== 7 ===
- Ian Adams, 84, Canadian author (S: Portrait of a Spy) and playwright, stroke.
- Alarm, 20, South Korean Overwatch player. (death announced on this date)
- Peter Hamilton Bailey, 94, Australian public servant and academic.
- Liudmila Belavenets, 81, Russian chess player, COVID-19.
- Sir John Butterfill, 80, British politician, MP (1983–2010).
- Hasan Čengić, 64, Bosnian politician, MP (1998–2002) and president of the parliament of the Islamic Community (2015–2019).
- Frank Coad, 91, Australian racing driver.
- James F. Fries, 83, American rheumatologist and author, complications from a stroke.
- Sunit Ghosh, 87, Indian cricket umpire.
- Sir James Gobbo, 90, Australian judge, governor of Victoria (1997–2000).
- Robin Greiner, 89, American Olympic pair skater (1956).
- Carmel Holmes, 75, Australian politician, Tasmania MHA (1984–1986).
- Bill Holsclaw, 85, American football player and coach.
- Barry Jackson, 83, English footballer (York City).
- Aliya Khambikova, 21, Russian volleyball player.
- Béla Kovács, 84, Hungarian clarinetist.
- Carmen Laffón, 87, Spanish painter and sculptor.
- Jacques Limouzy, 95, French politician, deputy (1967–1969, 1973–1981, 1986–2002).
- Bopol Mansiamina, 72, Congolese musician (Les Quatre Étoiles), stroke.
- Vadim Morozov, 67, Russian politician and writer, minister of railways (2003–2004), COVID-19.
- Igor Nikulin, 61, Russian hammer thrower, Olympic bronze medallist (1992).
- James Richard Poole, 89, American badminton player and football official (NFL).
- Jai Narayan Poonia, 87, Indian politician, Rajasthan MLA (1977–1980, 1985–1990), cardiac arrest.
- Brian Renwood, 86, Australian footballer (Collingwood).
- Enrique Rocha, 81, Mexican actor (Satánico pandemonium, Yo compro esa mujer, El Privilegio de Amar).
- Pappu Sain, 95, Pakistani dhol player, liver cancer.
- Sergei Shmatko, 55, Russian politician, minister of energy (2008–2012), COVID-19.
- Zena Stein, 99, South African epidemiologist.
- Dean Stockwell, 85, American actor (Quantum Leap, Married to the Mob, Paris, Texas).
- John Tabinaman, 69, Papua New Guinean politician, vice-president (2007–2009) and acting president (2008–2009) of the Autonomous Region of Bougainville.
- Bas van der Vlies, 79, Dutch politician, member of the Second Chamber (1981–2010) and leader of the Reformed Political Party (1986–2010), cancer.
- John White, 97, British art historian.
- Ronnie Williams, 59, American basketball player (Florida Gators, Tampa Bay Thrillers, Mississippi Jets), brain cancer.

=== 8 ===
- Amalia Aguilar, 97, Cuban-born Mexican actress (Ritmos del Caribe, Al son del mambo, Amor perdido) and dancer.
- Rinus Bennaars, 90, Dutch footballer (DOSKO, Feyenoord, national team).
- Keith Bradshaw, 58, Australian cricket player (Tasmania) and administrator, multiple myeloma.
- Annette Chalut, 97, French World War II Resistance member.
- Abdul Wahab Dalimunthe, 82, Indonesian politician, MP (2009–2014, since 2017).
- Medina Dixon, 59, American basketball player (Old Dominion Lady Monarchs), Olympic bronze medalist (1992), pancreatic cancer.
- Pedro Feliciano, 45, Puerto Rican baseball player (New York Mets, Fukuoka Daiei Hawks).
- Seán FitzPatrick, 73, Irish businessman (Anglo Irish Bank hidden loans controversy), cardiac arrest.
- Abdoulkarim Goukoye, 57, Nigerien militant and politician, spokesperson of the CSRD (2010–2011).
- Margo Guryan, 84, American singer-songwriter ("Sunday Mornin'").
- Mike Harris, 82, South African racing driver (Formula One).
- Kazuko Hosoki, 83, Japanese fortune teller and writer, respiratory failure.
- Stu Kennedy, 90, Canadian football player (Ottawa Rough Riders).
- Desiet Kidane, 21, Eritrean racing cyclist, traffic collision.
- Kirsi Kunnas, 96, Finnish children's author.
- Ringan Ledwidge, 50, British film director (Gone), cancer.
- Odd F. Lindberg, 76, Norwegian journalist and seal inspector.
- Sylvère Lotringer, 83, French literary critic and cultural theorist, founder of Semiotext(e).
- Mahlagha Mallah, 104, Iranian environmentalist, founder of the Women's Society Against Environmental Pollution.
- Ahad Miah, 65, Bangladeshi politician, MP (1988–1991).
- Gennady Muravin, 90, Russian-Finnish translator and journalist.
- Wilhelm Schraml, 86, German Roman Catholic prelate, auxiliary bishop of Regensburg (1986–2001) and bishop of Passau (2001–2012).
- Franz Streitwieser, 82, German-born American trumpet player, complications from Alzheimer's disease.
- Chittaranjan Das Thakur, Indian politician, West Bengal MLA (1996–2011).
- Muhammad Zada, 32, Pakistani anti-drug activist and blogger, shot.
- Peter Zimroth, 78, American attorney.

=== 9 ===
- John Bean, 94, British political activist and writer.
- Jamshid Behnam, 93, Iranian sociologist.
- Mariano Castillo Alcalá, 73, Spanish politician, mayor of Villacañas (1983–1987) and member of the Cortes of Castilla–La Mancha (1987–1991).
- Gela Charkviani, 82, Georgian diplomat.
- Max Cleland, 79, American politician, senator (1997–2003), administrator of veterans affairs (1977–1981), and Georgia secretary of state (1983–1996).
- Austin Currie, 82, Irish civil rights activist and politician, TD (1989–2002) and Minister of State at the Department of Justice (1994–1997).
- Jerry Douglas, 88, American actor (The Young and the Restless).
- Erika Fisch, 87, German runner and Olympic long jumper (1956).
- Willis Forko, 37, Liberian-American footballer (Real Salt Lake, Bodø/Glimt, national team).
- Bob Gill, 90, American illustrator and graphic designer.
- Larry Gordon, 76, American musician, injuries sustained in traffic collision.
- Loucif Hamani, 71, Algerian Olympic boxer (1972).
- Dianne Hamilton, 87, American politician, member of the New Mexico House of Representatives (1999–2017).
- Roy Holder, 75, English actor (Sorry!, Pride & Prejudice, War Horse), cancer.
- Jerry Kevorkian, 88, American applied mathematician.
- John Kinsella, 89, Irish composer.
- Richard Kyanka, 45, American blogger, founder of Something Awful, suicide.
- Memo Luna, 91, Mexican baseball player (Tijuana Potros, San Diego Padres, St. Louis Cardinals).
- Amkat Mai, 59, Papua New Guinean politician, MP (2012–2013, since 2015).
- Lloyd McCuiston, 103, American politician, member (1961–1994) and speaker (1981–1983) of the Arkansas House of Representatives.
- Alan Paller, 76, American cybersecurity expert.
- Koneru Ramakrishna Rao, 89, Indian psychologist.
- Iris Rezende, 87, Brazilian politician, minister of agriculture (1986–1990), governor of Goiás (1983–1986, 1991–1994), and senator (1995–2003), complications from a stroke.
- Aldo Rizzo, 86, Italian politician and magistrate, deputy (1979–1992) and mayor of Palermo (1992).
- Ethel Grodzins Romm, 96, American author, journalist, and businesswoman.
- Herbert Salcher, 92, Austrian politician, minister of finance (1981–1984) and MP (1983).
- Walter G. Schroeder, 94, American politician.
- Jakucho Setouchi, 99, Japanese Buddhist nun and writer, heart failure.
- Laurie Sheffield, 82, Welsh footballer (Newport County, Doncaster Rovers, Luton Town).
- Duane Wilson, 87, American baseball player (Boston Red Sox).

=== 10 ===
- Syed Iftikhar Bokhari, 86, Pakistani cricketer (Punjab, Lahore) and politician, senator (1988–1991).
- Delma Cowart, 80, American racing driver.
- Clyde Emrich, 90, American Olympic weightlifter (1952) and football coach (Chicago Bears).
- Spike Heatley, 88, British jazz double bassist.
- Mablen Jones, 78, American artist, traffic collision.
- Jun Hong Lu, 62, Chinese-born Australian religious leader.
- Ed Lucas, 82, American sportswriter (New York Yankees).
- Håkon Øverby, 79, Norwegian Olympic wrestler (1968, 1972).
- Otto Pendl, 70, Austrian politician, MP (1998–2017).
- Farouq Qasrawi, 79, Jordanian politician, minister of foreign affairs (2005).
- Ignatius Shixwameni, 55, Namibian politician, MP (since 1999).
- Gerald Sinstadt, 91, British television sports commentator and presenter (Granada Television).
- Gazbia Sirry, 96, Egyptian painter.
- Miroslav Žbirka, 69, Slovak singer and songwriter (Modus), pneumonia.
- Dale A. Zimmerman, 93, American naturalist.

=== 11 ===
- Germain Belzile, 63–64, American economist.
- Marcel Bérard, 88, Canadian politician, Quebec MNA (1973–1976).
- Per Aage Brandt, 77, Danish writer, linguist, and musician.
- Aleksander Ciążyński, 76, Polish Olympic field hockey player (1972).
- F. W. de Klerk, 85, South African politician, state president (1989–1994) and deputy president (1994–1996), Nobel Peace Prize laureate (1993), mesothelioma.
- Glen de Vries, 49, American businessman and space tourist (Blue Origin NS-18), plane crash.
- Graeme Edge, 80, English Hall of Fame drummer (The Moody Blues), songwriter and poet, cancer.
- Carl von Essen, 81, Swedish fencer, Olympic champion (1976).
- Harris Fawell, 92, American politician, member of the Illinois Senate (1963–1977) and the U.S. House of Representatives (1985–1999), complications from Alzheimer's disease.
- David Frank, 63, Kenyan-born British media executive, co-founder of RDF Media.
- Mark Gillespie, Australian singer-songwriter.
- John Goodsall, 68, American-British rock guitarist (Atomic Rooster, Brand X).
- Renee Grant-Williams, 78, American vocal coach.
- Agus Hamdani, 51, Indonesian politician, regent of Garut (2013–2014).
- Joe Hickey, 93, Australian footballer.
- João Isidório, 29, Brazilian singer and politician, Bahia MLA (since 2019), drowned.
- Hilmar Kopper, 86, German banker, chairman of Deutsche Bank (1989–1997).
- Jay Last, 92, American physicist.
- Robert M. Lawton, 90, American businessman and politician, member of the New Hampshire House of Representatives (1969–1980, 1994–2000).
- Lee Ying-yuan, 68, Taiwanese politician, member of the Legislative Yuan (1996–2000, 2012–2016), carcinoma of the ampulla of Vater.
- Cristiana Lôbo, 64, Brazilian journalist (GloboNews), multiple myeloma.
- Lee Maracle, 71, Canadian First Nations writer (Ravensong), activist and academic.
- Aga Mikolaj, 50, Polish operatic soprano, COVID-19.
- Bernard Morel, 75, French economist, academic, and politician, vice-president of the Regional Council of Provence-Alpes-Côte d'Azur (since 2012).
- Joseph Wilson Morris, 99, American attorney and jurist, judge (1974–1978) and chief judge (1975–1978) of the U.S. District Court for Eastern Oklahoma.
- Dino Pedriali, 71, Italian photographer.
- Edward L. Sadowsky, 92, American politician, member of the New York City Council (1962–1985).
- Sergei Shulgin, 65, Russian politician, deputy (1994–1995).
- Art Stewart, 94, American baseball scout.
- Mario Tosi, 79, Italian-born American painter and cinematographer (Carrie, The Stunt Man, Sybil).
- Buzz Tyler, 79, American professional wrestler.
- Elfrida von Nardroff, 96, American game show fraudster (Twenty-One).
- Phyllis Webb, 94, Canadian poet and radio broadcaster.
- David Weissbrodt, 77, American legal scholar.
- Clive Wilderspin, 91, Australian tennis player.
- Winter, 16, American dolphin with a prosthetic tail, subject of Dolphin Tale.
- Henry Woolf, 91, British actor (The Bed Sitting Room, The Rocky Horror Picture Show, Gorky Park).

=== 12 ===
- Bob Bondurant, 88, American Hall of Fame racing driver (Formula One) and instructor.
- Ramuntxo Camblong, 82, French politician, president of the Basque Nationalist Party (2004–2008).
- Yevgeniy Chazov, 92, Russian physician, minister of health (1987–1990).
- Lothar Claesges, 79, German cyclist, Olympic champion (1964).
- Geoffrey Cormack, 92, Australian cricketer.
- Humphrey T. Davies, 74, British translator.
- Stephen H. Davis, 82, American mathematician.
- Matthew Festing, 71, English Roman Catholic official, Prince and Grand Master of the Sovereign Military Order of Malta (2008–2017).
- Ron Flowers, 87, English footballer (Wolverhampton Wanderers, Northampton Town, national team), world champion (1966).
- Jim Fouras, 83, Greek-born Australian politician, member (1977–1986, 1989–2006) and speaker (1990–1996) of the Legislative Assembly of Queensland, heart attack.
- Gian Piero Galeazzi, 75, Italian competition rower, sports journalist, and television personality (90º minuto, Domenica in), complications from diabetes.
- Paul Gludovatz, 75, Austrian football manager (SV Ried, TSV Hartberg), COVID-19.
- Dave Hickey, 82, American art critic.
- Sir Ted Horlick, 96, British Navy vice admiral.
- Wasfi Kabha, 62, Palestinian politician, minister of prisoners' affairs (2006–2007) and state (2007), COVID-19. (death announced on this date)
- Jusuf Serang Kasim, 77, Indonesian politician, mayor of Tarakan (1999–2009).
- Bashir Momin Kavathekar, 74, Indian poet and writer.
- Kyozi Kawasaki, 91, Japanese physicist.
- Takeshi Koba, 85, Japanese baseball player (Hiroshima Carp, Nankai Hawks).
- Viktor Koklyushkin, 75, Russian satirist and television host.
- Hugh Leatherman, 90, American politician, member (since 1981) and president pro tempore (2014–2019) of the South Carolina Senate, cancer.
- Aleksandr Lenyov, 77, Russian footballer (Torpedo Moscow, Torpedo Kutaisi, Soviet Union national team).
- Bill Reichart, 86, Canadian-born American Olympic ice hockey player (1964).
- Rock Hard Ten, 20, American racehorse and sire.
- Leopold Sánchez, 73, Spanish artist.
- Ursula Selle, 88, Venezuelan Olympic fencer.
- Miloš Šibul, 44, Serbian politician, member of the Assembly of Vojvodina (2012–2016).
- Mikhail Sobolev, 84, Russian diplomat, ambassador to Guyana and Trinidad and Tobago (1989–1995).
- Jörn Svensson, 85, Danish-born Swedish politician, MP (1971–1988), MEP (1995–1999).
- John Toye, 79, British economist.
- Wilf Wedmann, 73, German-born Canadian Olympic high jumper (1968).
- Lakshman Wijesekara, 73, Sri Lankan actor, singer and composer (Miss Jenis).
- Arthur Wilson, 90, Australian football administrator and historian.
- Abd-al-Hafid Mahmud al-Zulaytini, 83, Libyan banker, governor of the Central Bank of Libya (1990–1996, 2011).

=== 13 ===
- Hadiya Khalaf Abbas, 63, Syrian politician, speaker of the People's Assembly (2016–2017), heart attack.
- Sohail Asghar, 67, Pakistani actor (Laag).
- Louis Bimpson, 92, English footballer (Liverpool, Blackburn Rovers, Rochdale).
- Sir Alexander Boswell, 93, British Army officer, lieutenant governor of Guernsey (1985–1990).
- Ed Bullins, 86, American playwright (Goin' a Buffalo), complications from dementia.
- Michael Corballis, 85, New Zealand psychologist and author.
- Frank Drew, 91, American brigadier general.
- Dragoș Petre Dumitriu, 57, Romanian journalist and politician, deputy (2004–2008), post-COVID-19 heart attack.
- David Fox, 80, Canadian actor (Mama, Grey Owl, X-Men), cancer.
- Grigori Galitsin, 64, Russian erotic photographer.
- Ivo Georgiev, 49, Bulgarian footballer (Debrecen, Korabostroitel, national team), heart failure.
- Gilbert Harman, 83, American philosopher.
- Sam Huff, 87, American Hall of Fame football player (New York Giants, Washington Redskins) and commentator.
- Jack Kiddey, 92, New Zealand cricketer (Canterbury).
- Lidia Lupu, 68, Moldovan economist and politician, deputy (2014–2019).
- Keith Mann, 89, New Zealand fencer and sports administrator.
- Philip Margo, 79, American musician (The Tokens).
- Petra Mayer, 46, American book review editor (NPR), pulmonary embolism.
- Ernie Michie, 88, Scottish rugby union player (Leicester Tigers, British & Irish Lions, national team).
- John Edwin Midwinter, 83, British electrical engineer and academic.
- Jarosław Pacoń, 49, Polish footballer (Stal Stalowa Wola).
- John Pearson, 91, British author (The Life of Ian Fleming, James Bond: The Authorized Biography of 007).
- Anatoliy Saulevych, 62, Ukrainian footballer (Karpaty Lviv, SKA Lviv, FC Bălți).
- Wilbur Smith, 88, Zambian-born South African novelist (When the Lion Feeds, The Courtney Novels, The Ballantyne Novels).
- Milind Teltumbde, Indian guerrilla, shot.
- Zane Timpson, 26, American skateboarder and artist, aortic dissection.
- Yūji Tokizaki, 81, Japanese politician, member of the House of Representatives (1990–1993).
- Bruno Vella, 88, Italian politician, president of the Province of Rieti (1975–1982), mayor of Rieti (1982–1983), and senator (1983–1992).
- Emi Wada, 84, Japanese costume designer (Ran, Hero, House of Flying Daggers), Oscar winner (1986).
- William Wright, 69, American-born Australian Roman Catholic prelate, bishop of Maitland-Newcastle (2011–2021), lung cancer.

=== 14 ===
- Etel Adnan, 96, Lebanese-American poet, novelist (Sitt Marie Rose), and visual artist.
- Emmanuel Quaye Archampong, 88, Ghanaian surgeon and academic.
- Bertie Auld, 83, Scottish football player (Celtic, national team) and manager (Partick Thistle), complications from dementia.
- Bart the Bear 2, 21, American Kodiak bear actor (Into the Wild, We Bought a Zoo, Pete's Dragon).
- László Z. Bitó, 87, Hungarian physiologist and writer.
- W. Sterling Cary, 94, American Christian minister, president of the National Council of Churches (1972–1975).
- Jorge Cervós-Navarro, 91, Spanish pathologist.
- Bobby Clark, 77, American actor (Casey Jones, Invasion of the Body Snatchers, Ransom!).
- Sani Dangote, 61, Nigerian businessman, vice-president of the Dangote Group.
- Alex D. Dickson, 95, American Anglican prelate, bishop of West Tennessee (1983–1994).
- Roger Elliott, 72, American politician.
- Heath Freeman, 41, American actor (Raising the Bar, Bones, Skateland), combined drug intoxication.
- Gene C. Howard, 95, American politician.
- Simon Khaya Moyo, 76, Zimbabwean diplomat and politician, ambassador to South Africa (2007–2011), chairman of ZANU–PF (2011–2014), and minister of media, information and broadcasting services (2017–2018), cancer.
- Luis Koster, 79, Uruguayan Olympic basketball player.
- John Lees, 91, English bodybuilder.
- Tore Lindholt, 80, Norwegian economist and politician, director of the Government Pension Fund (1990–2004).
- Jay Norman, 84, American actor (West Side Story).
- Virginio Pizzali, 86, Italian racing cyclist, Olympic champion (1956).
- Somkiat Pongpaiboon, 71, Thai politician, deputy (2007–2011) and co-founder of the Mass Party, cerebral hemorrhage.
- Thomas Porteous, 74, American jurist, judge of the U.S. District Court for Eastern Louisiana (1994–2010).
- Pierre Reid, 73, Canadian politician, Quebec MNA (2003–2018) and minister of education (2003–2005).
- Georgiy Rudov, 82, Russian diplomat, ambassador to Laos (1990–1993) and Kyrgyzstan (1997–2002).
- Rašid Šemšedinović, 80, Serbian Olympic ice hockey player (1964).
- Gamini Susiriwardana, 58, Sri Lankan singer and actor (Sirasa Superstar, Mago Digo Dai), cancer.
- Satya Vrat Shastri, 91, Indian Sanskrit scholar.
- Chanmyr Udumbara, 73, Russian intelligence officer and politician, senator (2001–2002).
- Marek Vokáč, 62, Czech chess grandmaster.
- John B. Winter, 91, American politician.
- Vladimir Zhutenkov, 59, Russian businessman and politician, deputy (2016–2017).

=== 15 ===
- Dzifa Attivor, 65, Ghanaian politician, minister of transport (2013–2015).
- Yasser Al-Awadi, 43, Yemeni politician, member of the House of Representatives (since 2003), heart attack.
- Heber Bartolome, 73, Filipino folk singer.
- Mannu Bhandari, 90, Indian writer.
- Katarina Blagojević, 78, Serbian chess player.
- Tony Buck, 84, British Olympic wrestler (1964).
- Werner Burger, 85, German numismatist.
- Giovanni Colonnelli, 70, Italian footballer (Parma, Reggiana).
- Valeriy Dolinin, 68, Russian rower, Olympic silver medallist (1980).
- Clarissa Eden, Countess of Avon, 101, British memoirist, spouse of the prime minister (1955–1957).
- Estrella Blanca, 83, Mexican professional wrestler (EMLL).
- Oldřich Hamera, 77, Czech artist.
- Keith Harding, 82, British politician.
- Larry J. Hopkins, 88, American politician, member of the U.S. House of Representatives (1979–1993).
- Hasan Azizul Huq, 82, Bangladeshi novelist (Agunpakhi).
- Jerry Johnson, 77, American baseball player (Philadelphia Phillies, San Francisco Giants, San Diego Padres), Lewy body dementia and COPD.
- Bernard Judge, 90, American architect.
- Michael Kaser, 95, British-Swiss economist.
- Julio Lugo, 45, Dominican baseball player (Houston Astros, Tampa Bay Devil Rays, Boston Red Sox), World Series champion (2007), heart attack.
- Bengt Madsen, 79, Swedish football executive (Malmö), cancer.
- Osman Öcalan, 63, Turkish militant and political activist, commander of the PKK, COVID-19.
- Karim Ouellet, 36, Senegalese-born Canadian singer, complications from diabetes.
- Roger Phillips, 88, British botanist and writer.
- Jason Plummer, 52, Australian Olympic swimmer (1988).
- Babasaheb Purandare, 99, Indian writer, historian and theatre personality, pneumonia.
- Alamin Mohammed Seid, 74, Eritrean politician, minister of information (1993–1996).
- Daulet Sembaev, 86, Kazakhstani politician and banker, first deputy prime minister (1992–1993), chairman of the National Bank (1993–1996), and senator (1996–1997).
- Sir Rod Weir, 94, New Zealand businessman.

=== 16 ===
- Brian Clark, 89, British playwright (Whose Life Is It Anyway?) and screenwriter, aortic aneurysm.
- Bobby Collins, 88, American football coach (Southern Miss Golden Eagles, SMU Mustangs).
- Ferenc Czvikovszki, 89, Hungarian Olympic fencer (1960).
- Tony Dron, 75, British motor racing driver and writer, complications from COPD.
- Kamil Durczok, 53, Polish journalist.
- Jim Fenwick, 87, Australian photojournalist.
- Richard Finn, 88, American baseball player and coach (Toledo, Ohio State).
- Drew Gibbs, 59, American football coach (Kean Cougars), complications from surgery.
- Des Greenslade, 88, Welsh rugby union player.
- Md. Akabbar Hossain, 65, Bangladeshi politician, MP (since 2001).
- Stephen Holgate, 49, English rugby league player (Workington Town, Wigan Warriors, national team).
- Sezai Karakoç, 88, Turkish writer and philosopher.
- Jyrki Kasvi, 57, Finnish politician, MP (2003–2011, 2015–2019), cancer.
- Alexander Losyukov, 78, Russian diplomat, ambassador to New Zealand (1992–1993), Australia (1993–1997), and Japan (2004–2006).
- John Luxton, 75, New Zealand politician, MP (1987–2002).
- Renate Mann, 68, Austrian politician, member of the Landtag of Upper Austria (2008–2009).
- E. J. Miller Laino, 73, American poet.
- Malcolm Molyneux, 77, British medical researcher.
- Shakeel ur Rahman, 52, Pakistani jurist, judge of the Lahore High Court (since 2018), cancer.
- Ri Yong-suk, 105, North Korean revolutionary and politician, deputy (1998–2009). (death announced on this date)
- J. Victor Rowell, 82, American politician.
- Nadrian Seeman, 75, American nanotechnologist and crystallographer.
- Mieczysław Szostek, 88, Polish politician, deputy (1985–1989).

=== 17 ===
- Abdul Ghafar Atan, 65, Malaysian politician, Malacca State MLA (2004–2021), COVID-19.
- Afsaruddin Ahmad, 81, Bangladeshi politician, MP (1996–2001).
- Keith Allison, 79, American musician (Paul Revere & the Raiders).
- Leonid Bartenyev, 88, Ukrainian sprinter and coach, Olympic silver medalist (1956, 1960).
- John Vernon Bartlett, 94, British civil engineer (Channel Tunnel, Victoria line).
- Martha Blackman, 94, American viola da gamba player and lutenist.
- Gene Carter, 86, American lawyer and jurist, judge (since 1983) and chief judge (1989–1996) of the U.S. District Court for Maine.
- Tom Colley, 68, Canadian ice hockey player (Minnesota North Stars).
- Ken Colvin, 82, Australian footballer (South Melbourne), COVID-19.
- Igor Denisov, 80, Russian physician and politician, Soviet minister of health (1990–1991).
- Gilbert Dragon, 52, Haitian police chief and guerilla commander, suspect in the assassination of Jovenel Moïse, complications from COVID-19.
- Jimmie Durham, 81, American sculptor and poet.
- Dave Frishberg, 88, American jazz pianist and songwriter ("I'm Just a Bill").
- Jacques Hamelink, 82, Dutch poet, novelist, and literary critic.
- Karel Havlík, 77, Czech politician, minister without portfolio (1990).
- Peter Iacangelo, 73, American actor (Fight Club, The Rat Pack, Look Who's Talking Now).
- Theuns Jordaan, 50, South African singer-songwriter, leukaemia.
- Reg Kent, 77, Australian footballer (Footscray).
- Teresa Kodelska, 92, Polish Olympic alpine skier (1952).
- Art LaFleur, 78, American actor (Field of Dreams, The Sandlot, The Santa Clause 2), Parkinson's disease.
- Christine Laszar, 89, German actress (Geschwader Fledermaus, Before the Lightning Strikes, For Eyes Only).
- Antonio Leal Labrín, 71, Chilean politician, member (1998–2010) and president (2006–2007) of the Chamber of Deputies.
- R. N. R. Manohar, Indian film director (Maasilamani, Vellore Maavattam) and actor (Sutta Pazham), COVID-19.
- Arsenio Moreno Mendoza, 68, Spanish academic, writer, and politician, mayor of Úbeda (1983–1989).
- Max Olding, 92, Australian pianist and teacher.
- Zuhair Ramadan, 62, Syrian actor, pneumonia.
- Stu Rasmussen, 73, American politician, mayor of Silverton, Oregon (2009–2015), prostate cancer.
- Igor Savochkin, 58, Russian actor (Night Watch, Admiral, Leviathan) and television presenter.
- Mohsen Mojtahed Shabestari, 84, Iranian Shiite cleric and politician, MP (1980–1988, 1992–2000), member of the Assembly of Experts (since 1983), cardiac arrest.
- Max Sopacua, 75, Indonesian politician and sportscaster (TVRI), MP (2004–2014).
- Tom Stoddart, 68, British photographer, cancer.
- Levan Tsutskiridze, 95, Georgian monumentalist artist, illustrator, and painter.
- Young Dolph, 36, American rapper, shot.

=== 18 ===
- Latif al-Ani, 89, Iraqi photographer.
- Peter Buck, 90, American restaurateur, co-founder of Subway.
- George Eogan, 91, Irish archaeologist.
- Geoffrey Giudice, 73, Australian jurist, judge of the Federal Court (1997–2012).
- Richard Goldbloom, 96, Canadian pediatrician and academic, chancellor of Dalhousie University (2001–2008).
- Slide Hampton, 89, American jazz trombonist.
- Jørgen Haugen Sørensen, 87, Danish sculptor.
- Novy Kapadia, 68, Indian football journalist, motor neuron disease.
- Al Noor Kassum, 97, Tanzanian politician, MP.
- Glenn Keeney, 79, American martial artist.
- Paul Kehinde, 33, Nigerian powerlifter, Paralympic champion (2016), 65 kg world record-holder (since 2016).
- İmran Kılıç, 64, Turkish politician, MP (since 2015), COVID-19.
- Dzyanis Kowba, 42, Belarusian footballer (Lokomotiv Vitebsk, Krylia Sovetov Samara, national team), COVID-19.
- Alberto Labarthe, 93, Chilean Olympic sprinter (1948).
- Joe Laidlaw, 71, English footballer (Middlesbrough, Carlisle United, Doncaster Rovers).
- Fabiola Letelier, 92, Chilean lawyer (assassination of Orlando Letelier) and human rights activist, stroke.
- Leif Terje Løddesøl, 86, Norwegian banker, CEO of Den norske Creditbank (1980–1988) and Statoil (1996–2003).
- Kovi Manisekaran, 94, Indian scholar, film director and actor.
- Levy Mkandawire, 60, Zambian politician, traffic collision.
- Frank R. Pfetsch, 85, German political scientist.
- Sue Picus, 73, American contract bridge player.
- Ragnhild Pohanka, 89, Swedish politician, spokesperson of the Green Party (1984–1986) and MP (1988–1991, 1994–1998).
- Lori-Jane Powell, 50, Canadian racquetball player, heart attack.
- Mick Rock, 72, British photographer.
- Ack van Rooyen, 91, Dutch jazz trumpeter and flugelhornist.
- William Evan Sanders, 101, American Episcopalian prelate, bishop of East Tennessee (1985–1992).
- Kim Suominen, 52, Finnish football player (Turun Palloseura, IFK Norrköping, national team)
- John Taylor, 89, Scottish Episcopal prelate, bishop of Glasgow and Galloway (1991–1996).
- Zenon Trzonkowski, 64, Polish football player (Śląsk Wrocław, Zagłębie Lubin) and manager (Odra Opole).
- María Elsa Viteri, 56, Ecuadorian economist, minister of finance (2008–2010) and of economy and finance (2018), pancreatic cancer.
- Ardeshir Zahedi, 93, Iranian politician and diplomat, minister of foreign affairs (1966–1971), ambassador to the U.K. (1962–1966) and U.S. (1960–1962, 1973–1979), COVID-19 and pneumonia.
- Zvi Zilker, 88, German-born Israeli politician, mayor of Ashdod (1969–1983, 1989–2008), cancer.

=== 19 ===
- Nina Agapova, 95, Russian actress (Seven Old Men and a Girl, The Invisible Man, Forgotten Melody for a Flute).
- Abderrahmane Amalou, 83, Moroccan politician, minister of justice (1995–1997).
- Enrico Bacher, 80, Italian Olympic ice hockey player (1964).
- Julie Belaga, 91, American politician, member of the Connecticut House of Representatives (1977–1987).
- Rod Blackburn, 82, American ice hockey player (New Hampshire Wildcats).
- Pierre-André Boutin, 86, Canadian politician.
- Ian Fishback, 42, American army officer and whistleblower.
- Costantino Fittante, 87, Italian politician, deputy (1983–1987).
- Josée Forest-Niesing, 56, Canadian politician, senator (since 2018), complications from COVID-19.
- Hank von Hell, 49, Norwegian singer (Turbonegro) and actor (Cornelis).
- Sylvia Kantaris, 85, British-Australian poet.
- Sirilal Kodikara, 97, Sri Lankan journalist, novelist and poet.
- Don Kojis, 82, American basketball player (Detroit Pistons, San Diego Rockets, Seattle SuperSonics).
- Edgardo Labella, 70, Filipino politician, mayor of Cebu City (since 2019).
- Ken Moffett, 90, American federal mediator and union official, executive director of the Major League Baseball Players Association (1982–1983).
- Guillermo Morón, 95, Venezuelan writer and historian.
- Ricky Nelson, 62, American baseball player (Seattle Mariners), complications from COVID-19.
- Pivotal, 28, British Thoroughbred racehorse and sire.
- Alex Rebar, 81, American actor (The Incredible Melting Man).
- Cedric Robinson, 88, British walking guide, Queen's Guide to the Sands (1963–2019).
- Bernard Rollin, 78, American philosopher and academic.
- Frederick B. Rowe, 84, Canadian politician.
- Will Ryan, 72, American voice actor (The Land Before Time, The Little Mermaid, An American Tail) and singer, cancer.
- György Schöpflin, 81, Hungarian politician, MEP (2004–2019).
- John Sewell, 85, English football player (Charlton Athletic, Crystal Palace) and manager (St. Louis Stars), dementia.
- Norman Webster, 80, Canadian journalist and editor (The Globe and Mail), complications from Parkinson's disease.
- Thomas Welsh, 88, British Olympic swimmer.
- Marie Lovise Widnes, 91, Norwegian poet and politician, MP (1989–1993).

=== 20 ===
- Gbenga Aluko, 58, Nigerian politician, senator (1999–2003).
- Rudy Croes, 74, Aruban politician, MP (1989–2001), minister of justice (2001–2009).
- Jim Crotty, 83, American football player (Washington Redskins, Buffalo Bills).
- Diomid, 60, Russian Orthodox prelate, bishop of Anadyr and Chukotka (2000–2008), traffic collision.
- Emily Farnham, 84, Canadian curler.
- Burgess Gardner, 85, American jazz trumpeter.
- Valery Garkalin, 67, Russian actor (Katala, Tsar Ivan the Terrible, Shirli-myrli), COVID-19.
- Andreas Georgiou, 68, Cypriot politician, MP (1987–1996).
- Don Grimes, 84, Australian politician, senator (1974–1987), minister of social security (1983–1984) and community services (1984–1987).
- Abdiaziz Mohamud Guled, Somali journalist (Radio Mogadishu), bombing.
- Ted Herold, 79, German singer and actor, house fire.
- Billy Hinsche, 70, American musician (Dino, Desi & Billy, The Beach Boys), giant cell carcinoma.
- Rita Letendre, 93, Canadian painter.
- David Longdon, 56, British singer and musician (Big Big Train).
- Carlo Maria Mariani, 90, Italian painter.
- Ray McLoughlin, 82, Irish rugby union player (Gosforth, Barbarians, national team).
- Merima Njegomir, 68, Serbian folk and sevdah singer.
- Nobuaki Sekine, 87, Japanese voice actor (.hack//Legend of the Twilight), cerebral infarction.
- Toyonoumi Shinji, 56, Japanese sumo wrestler.
- Steve Smith, 57, American football player (Los Angeles Raiders, Seattle Seahawks), complications from amyotrophic lateral sclerosis.
- Kojo Tsikata, 85, Ghanaian military officer, head of national security and foreign affairs of the PDNC (1982–1995).

=== 21 ===
- Doris Abele, 64, German marine biologist, cancer.
- Asongo Alalaparu, 79, Surinamese traditional leader, granman of the Tiriyó (since 1997), COVID-19.
- Ruben Altunyan, 82, Armenian composer and conductor.
- Yul Anderson, 63, American musician.
- Gurmeet Bawa, 77, Indian folk singer.
- Robert Bly, 94, American poet (Iron John: A Book About Men, The Sibling Society).
- Lou Brooks, 77, American graphic artist and cartoonist.
- Mary Brown, 86, American politician, member of the Michigan House of Representatives (1977–1994).
- Marietta Chudakova, 84, Russian literary critic, historian, and writer, COVID-19.
- Diane Coates, 89, British Olympic javelin thrower.
- Gordon Crosse, 83, English composer.
- Lou Cutell, 91, American actor (Pee-wee's Big Adventure, Betty White's Off Their Rockers, Honey, I Shrunk the Kids).
- Bert de Leon, 74, Filipino television director (Bubble Gang, Eat Bulaga!, Okay Ka, Fairy Ko!).
- Soher El Bably, 84, Egyptian actress (Madrast Al-Mushaghebeen).
- Antonio Escohotado, 80, Spanish philosopher and writer.
- Verawaty Fadjrin, 64, Indonesian badminton player, world champion (1980), lung cancer.
- Guy W. Fiske, 97, American businessman, deputy secretary of commerce (1982–1983).
- Ed Holler, 81, American football player (Green Bay Packers, Pittsburgh Steelers), injuries sustained in traffic collision.
- Bakhtiyor Ikhtiyarov, 81, Uzbek actor (Yor-yor, The Seventh Bullet, Shikari).
- Vincenzo La Russa, 83, Italian politician, senator (1979–1983, 1994–1996) and deputy (1983–1987).
- Marcella LeBeau, 102, American Lakota politician, nurse and World War II veteran, member of the Cheyenne River Sioux Tribal Council (1991–1995).
- Ralph Miller, 88, American Olympic alpine skier (1956), cancer.
- Leonid Pilunsky, 74, Ukrainian politician, member of the Verkhovna Rada of Crimea (2006–2014), COVID-19.
- Scott Robbe, 66, American television and film producer (Seven and a Match, Queer Eye), complications from blood cancer.
- Nina Ruslanova, 75, Russian actress (Afonya, Tears Were Falling, Be My Husband), COVID-19 and pneumonia.
- Jean-Pierre Schumacher, 97, French monk, survivor of the Tibhirine massacre.
- Leane Suniar, 73, Indonesian Olympic archer (1976), colon cancer.
- Bengt Waller, 86, Swedish Olympic sailor (1960).
- Sherif Zaki, Egyptian-born American pathologist.

=== 22 ===
- E. C. Alft, 96, American historian and politician, mayor of Elgin, Illinois (1967–1971).
- Miquel Barceló, 73, Spanish science fiction writer and translator.
- James M. Bobbitt, 91, American chemist (Bobbitt reaction), traffic collision.
- Igor Bugayev, 88, Russian politician.
- Paul Burbridge, 89, British Anglican clergyman, dean of Norwich (1983–1995).
- Art Clemente, 96, American politician, member of the Washington House of Representatives (1973–1979).
- Erhaab, 30, American Thoroughbred racehorse.
- Aldo Falivena, 93, Italian journalist.
- Kim Friele, 86, Norwegian LGBT rights activist.
- Patricia Garfield, 87, American psychologist.
- Fayez Ghosn, 71, Lebanese politician, minister of defense (2011–2014).
- Margaret Giannini, 100, American physician and medical researcher.
- Noah Gordon, 95, American novelist (The Physician).
- Doug Hill, 71, American meteorologist (WUSA, WJLA-TV).
- Bernard Holley, 81, British actor (Z-Cars, Doctor Who).
- Susan V. John, 64, American politician, member of the New York State Assembly (1991–2010), cancer.
- Doug Jones, 64, American baseball player (Milwaukee Brewers, Cleveland Indians, Oakland Athletics), COVID-19.
- Kim Young-jung, 92, South Korean politician, MP (1985–1988).
- Mimi Kyprianou, 89, Cypriot public figure, first lady (1977–1988).
- Volker Lechtenbrink, 77, German actor (Iron Gustav, Der Hausgeist, By Way of the Stars) and singer.
- Ryo Mabuchi, 88, Japanese Olympic diver (1956, 1960), emphysema.
- Doug MacLeod, 62, Australian author and screenwriter (The Comedy Company, Dogstar, Full Frontal).
- Stuart Macintyre, 74, Australian historian.
- Omar Malavé, 58, Venezuelan baseball manager (Dunedin Blue Jays, Algodoneros de Unión Laguna).
- Pa Nderry Mbai, Gambian-American journalist.
- Hilda Múdra, 95, Austrian-born Slovak figure skating coach.
- Paolo Pietrangeli, 76, Italian singer-songwriter, film director (Pigs Have Wings) and screenwriter.
- Ned Rea, 77, Irish hurler (Faughs, Limerick).
- Hiroichi Sakai, 92, Japanese politician, member of the House of Representatives (1969–1993).
- Joanne Shenandoah, 64, American Oneida Indian singer and composer.
- Babette Smith, 79, Australian historian.
- William L. Stearman, 99, American foreign service officer. (death announced on this date)
- Asya Sultanova, 98, Azerbaijani composer.
- Baba Suwe, 63, Nigerian actor and comedian.
- Marie Versini, 81, French actress (A Holiday with Piroschka, The Brides of Fu Manchu, Is Paris Burning?).
- Sylvia Weinstock, 91, American baker.

=== 23 ===
- Barrie Aitchison, 84, English footballer (Tottenham Hotspur, Colchester United, Cambridge City).
- Christopher Boehm, 90, American cultural anthropologist.
- Janet Campbell Hale, 75, Native American writer and teacher, complications from COVID-19.
- Tatyana Chudova, 77, Russian composer.
- Chun Doo-hwan, 90, South Korean military officer and politician, president (1980–1988), multiple myeloma.
- Mary Collinson, 69, Maltese-British model (Playboy) and actress (Twins of Evil), bronchopneumonia.
- Robert Ellis, 92, British-born New Zealand artist.
- Bob Essery, 91, British railway modeller and historian.
- Dan Georgakas, 83, American anarchist poet and historian.
- Nikolai Golyushev, 91, Russian opera singer.
- Marko Grilc, 38, Slovenian snowboarder, accidental head trauma.
- Hasan Fehmi Güneş, 87, Turkish politician, minister of interior (1979).
- Miran Györek, 69, Slovenian politician, MP (2008–2011).
- Amman Jalmaani, 72, Filipino Olympic swimmer (1964, 1968, 1972).
- Jan Kawulok, 75, Polish Olympic skier (1968).
- Simon Kistemaker, 80, Dutch football manager (Drechtsteden '79, De Graafschap, SC Telstar).
- Bjørn Larsson, 97, Norwegian Olympic wrestler (1952).
- Sadhu Charan Mahato, 48, Indian politician, Jharkhand MLA (2014–2019), throat cancer.
- Sir James Fitz-Allen Mitchell, 90, Vincentian politician, premier (1972–1974) and prime minister (1984–2000).
- Riuler, 23, Brazilian footballer (J.FC Miyazaki, Shonan Bellmare), heart attack.
- Hans Rosendahl, 76, Swedish Olympic swimmer (1964).
- Omar Sabry, 94, Egyptian Olympic water polo player.
- Romuald Schild, 85, Polish archaeologist.
- Teata Semiz, 87, American Hall of Fame bowler, complications of broken hip.
- Don Shondell, 92, American volleyball coach.
- Melvin Tinker, 66, British clergyman, pancreatic cancer.
- Rosalie Trombley, 82, Canadian music director (CKLW).
- Andrew Vachss, 79, American crime fiction author (Strega, Batman: The Ultimate Evil) and attorney.
- Bill Virdon, 90, American baseball player (St. Louis Cardinals, Pittsburgh Pirates) and manager (Houston Astros), World Series champion (1960, 1971).
- Allin Vlasenko, 83, Ukrainian conductor.
- Martin Wood, 94, British electrical engineer and entrepreneur.

=== 24 ===
- Aron Atabek, 68, Kazakhstani writer, poet and dissident, COVID-19.
- Hermann Bausinger, 95, German cultural scientist.
- Mārtiņš Brauns, 70, Latvian composer ("Saule, Pērkons, Daugava"), COVID-19.
- Lisa Brown, 67, American actress (As the World Turns, Guiding Light).
- Frank Burrows, 77, Scottish football player (Swindon Town, Scunthorpe United) and manager (Portsmouth).
- Ian Curteis, 86, British dramatist (The Falklands Play).
- Luis Díaz, 76, Colombian Olympic cyclist (1972), cancer.
- Ennio Doris, 81, Italian banker, founder of Banca Mediolanum.
- Guillermo Echevarría, 73, Mexican Olympic swimmer (1964, 1968).
- U. L. Gooch, 98, American aviator and politician, member of the Kansas Senate (1993–2004).
- Wiesław Hartman, 71, Polish show jumping equestrian, Olympic silver medallist (1980).
- Sandy MacIntyre, 86, Canadian fiddler.
- Cliff Marshall, 66, English footballer (Miami Toros, Southport, Everton).
- Marilyn McLeod, 82, American singer-songwriter ("Love Hangover", "You Can't Turn Me Off (In the Middle of Turning Me On)").
- Keith Morton, 87, English footballer (Darlington).
- Bill Muirhead, 92, Scottish curler.
- Raif Nagm, 94–95, Jordanian civil engineer and politician, minister of public works and housing (1984–1985).
- Aryeh Nehemkin, 96, Israeli politician, member of the Knesset (1981–1988) and minister of agriculture (1984–1988).
- Allan Roy Oliver, 85, Canadian politician.
- Daniel L. Overmyer, 86, Canadian academic, cancer.
- Musafir Paswan, 66, Indian politician, Bihar MLA (since 2020).
- Jeannette Ramos, 89, Puerto Rican judge, first lady (1967–1969).
- Betty Jean Robinson, 88, American singer.
- Ivan Stanchov, 92, Bulgarian diplomat and politician, ambassador to the U.K. (1991–1994) and minister of foreign affairs (1994–1995).
- Jim Warren, 85, American computer scientist, co-founder of the West Coast Computer Faire and Dr. Dobb's Journal.
- Yvonne Wilder, 84, American actress (West Side Story, Seems Like Old Times, Full House).

=== 25 ===
- Red Jordan Arobateau, 78, American writer and artist.
- Theodorus Dekker, 94, Dutch mathematician.
- Russell Freeman, 52, American football player (Denver Broncos, Oakland Raiders).
- Carol Gould, 68, American writer and broadcaster.
- John Hall, 88, American businessman, chairman and CEO of Ashland Oil Inc. (1981–1997).
- Dieter B. Herrmann, 82, German astronomer.
- Taras Hryb, 69, Canadian Olympic wrestler.
- Galal Ibrahim, Egyptian football executive, president of Zamalek (1992–1996, 2010–2011).
- Risto Kala, 80, Finnish Olympic basketball player (1964).
- Peter Kanis, 90, Australian footballer (Hawthorn).
- Julien Le Bas, 97, French Olympic sprinter (1948).
- Justin Lekoundzou, 80, Congolese politician, minister of finance (1983–1987) and MP (1992–1993, 2002–2012).
- Bohdan Levkiv, 71, Ukrainian politician, mayor of Ternopil (2002–2006).
- Charles Moose, 68, American author and police officer (D.C. sniper attacks), chief of the Montgomery County Police Department (1999–2003).
- Peeter Olesk, 67, Estonian literary scholar and politician, minister of population and ethnic affairs (1993–1994) and culture (1994–1995).
- Oleksandr Omelchenko, 83, Ukrainian politician, mayor of Kyiv (1999–2006) and deputy (2007–2012), COVID-19.
- Don Phillips, 80, American casting director (Dog Day Afternoon, Fast Times at Ridgemont High) and producer (Melvin and Howard).
- Abani Roy, 82, Indian politician, MP (1998–2011).
- Anne Rudin, 97, American politician, mayor of Sacramento (1983–1992), pneumonia.
- Numan al-Samarrai, 86, Iraqi Muslim scholar and politician, secretary-general of the Iraqi Islamic Party (1960).
- Sananta Tanty, 69, Indian Assamese poet.
- Augusto Zweifel, 100, Italian footballer (Novara) and tennis player.

=== 26 ===
- Norman Allen, 93, Irish hurler and Gaelic footballer (St Vincents).
- Mohan Bhandari, 84, Indian writer.
- Óscar Catacora, 34, Peruvian film director, screenwriter, and cinematographer (Eternity), appendicitis.
- Siobhan Cattigan, 26, Scottish rugby union player (Stirling County, national team).
- Doug Cowie, 95, Scottish footballer (Dundee, Greenock Morton, national team).
- Keith De Lacy, 81, Australian politician, Queensland MLA (1983–1998) and treasurer (1989–1996), cancer.
- Michael Fisher, 90, English physicist.
- Roger Fritz, 85, German actor (Cross of Iron) and film director, stroke.
- Jack Fujimoto, 93, American academic administrator.
- Buster Guzzardo, 98, American politician, member of the Louisiana House of Representatives (1987–1996).
- Hamdi Hassan, 65, Egyptian politician, MP (2005–2010).
- Kwon Jung-dong, 89, South Korean politician, minister of labor (1980–1982) and MP (1985–1988).
- Ruslan Mostovyi, 47, Ukrainian football player (Avanhard Zhydachiv, Spartak Nalchik) and manager (Prykarpattia Ivano-Frankivsk), traffic collision.
- Mel Nelson, 85, American baseball player (St. Louis Cardinals, Minnesota Twins, Los Angeles Angels).
- Nguyễn Hồng Nhị, 84, Vietnamese fighter pilot (VPAF).
- Mark Roth, 70, American bowler, pneumonia.
- Stephen Sondheim, 91, American composer and lyricist (West Side Story, Company, Sweeney Todd), nine-time Tony winner, cardiovascular disease.
- James Stewart, 85, Scottish-born American politician.
- Bichu Thirumala, 80, Indian lyricist (Thrishna, Krishnagudiyil Oru Pranayakalathu, Kadinjool Kalyanam) and poet, heart attack.
- Aleksandr Timoshinin, 73, Russian rower, Olympic champion (1968, 1972).
- German Zonin, 95, Russian football player (Dynamo Leningrad) and manager (Myanmar national team, Soviet Union national team).

=== 27 ===
- Adolfo, 98, Cuban-born American fashion designer.
- Apetor, 57, Norwegian YouTuber, drowned.
- Tony Ayres, 54, English darts player.
- Donald Caspar, 94, American structural biologist.
- John Challifour, 83, British-born American mathematician.
- Jacques Cinq-Mars, 79, Canadian archaeologist.
- Curley Culp, 75, American Hall of Fame football player (Kansas City Chiefs, Houston Oilers, Detroit Lions), Super Bowl champion (1970), complications from pancreatic cancer.
- Beverley Dunn, 88, Australian actress (The Flying Doctors, Prisoner, Dogstar).
- Almudena Grandes, 61, Spanish writer, cancer.
- Teppo Hauta-aho, 80, Finnish double bassist.
- Gregory J. Hobbs Jr., 76, American jurist, associate justice on the Colorado Supreme Court (1996–2015).
- Matti Keinonen, 80, Finnish Hall of Fame ice hockey player (Lukko, HJK, national team), cancer.
- Frederick C. Luebke, 94, American historian.
- Ken Lyotier, 74, Canadian social worker.
- Lubomyra Mandziy, 48, Ukrainian educator and civil servant, acting minister of education and science (2020).
- Shirley McBay, 86, American mathematician and activist.
- Ed McClanahan, 89, American novelist and essayist.
- Eddie Mekka, 69, American actor (Laverne & Shirley, Blansky's Beauties, Top of the World).
- Milutin Mrkonjić, 79, Serbian politician, minister of infrastructure, energy and transportation (2008–2013).
- Jimmy O'Dea, 86, Irish-born New Zealand trade unionist and activist.
- Ruy Ohtake, 83, Brazilian architect, myelodysplastic syndrome.
- Park Jong-soo, 80, South Korean taekwondo practitioner, original master of taekwondo.
- Francis Routh, 94, British composer and author.
- Giampaolo Tronchin, 80, Italian Olympic rower (1972).
- Monique Vinh Thuy, 75, French diplomat, princess of Vietnam in-exile.
- Colin Young, 94, British film educator, chairman of the UCLA School of Theater, Film and Television.

=== 28 ===
- Virgil Abloh, 41, American fashion designer, founder and CEO of Off-White (since 2012), cancer.
- Brian Barnes, 77, English artist.
- Pat Barrett, 85, Irish professional wrestler (NWA).
- Mustafa Cengiz, 71, Turkish football executive, president of Galatasaray (2018–2021), cancer.
- Jacqueline Danno, 90, French actress.
- Lee Elder, 87, American golfer.
- Paul Lawrence Farber, 77, American science historian.
- August von Finck Jr., 91, German businessman.
- Justo Gallego Martínez, 96, Spanish monk and builder.
- Alexander Gradsky, 72, Russian rock singer, musician, and composer, stroke.
- Doyle Hamm, 64, American convicted murderer and botched execution survivor, cancer.
- Chuck Hazama, 89, American politician, mayor of Rochester, Minnesota (1979–1995).
- Johnny Hills, 87, English footballer (Tottenham Hotspur, Bristol Rovers).
- C. J. Hunter, 52, American Olympic shot putter (1996) and coach, world champion (1999).
- Lalthlamuong Keivom, 82, Indian writer and diplomat, cancer.
- Trevor Kennedy, 79, Australian businessman.
- Nakamura Kichiemon II, 77, Japanese actor (Kuroneko, Double Suicide, Onihei Hankachō) and kabuki performer, heart failure.
- Emmit King, 62, American Olympic sprinter (1984, 1988), shot.
- Tommy Lane, 83, American actor (Shaft, Live and Let Die, Shamus), COPD.
- Jean-Paul LeBlanc, 98, Canadian politician, New Brunswick MLA (1970–1974).
- Henry Longs, Nigerian politician, Plateau State MHA, surgery complications.
- Carrie Meek, 95, American politician, member of the Florida House of Representatives (1979–1982) and Senate (1982–1992) and the U.S. House of Representatives (1993–2003).
- Meñique, 87, Panamanian singer and songwriter.
- Emily Mkamanga, 71, Malawian writer and political commentator.
- François Moncla, 89, French rugby union player (Racing 92, Section Paloise, national team).
- Günter Oberhuber, 67, Austrian Olympic ice hockey player.
- Norodom Ranariddh, 77, Cambodian politician and law academic, prime minister (1993–1997), member (1998–2006, 2017–2018) and president (1998–2006) of the National Assembly.
- Prince Andrew Romanoff, 98, Russian-American aristocrat and writer, disputed head of the House of Romanov (since 2016).
- Guillermo Roux, 92, Argentine painter.
- Patu Tiava'asu'e Falefatu Sapolu, 71, Samoan judge, chief justice (1992–2019), attorney-general (1988–1991).
- Russ Sainty, 85, English pop singer.
- Phil Saviano, 69, American children's rights advocate and child abuse whistleblower, gallbladder cancer.
- K. Sivasankar, 72, Indian choreographer (Poove Unakkaga, Vishwa Thulasi, Uliyin Osai) and actor, COVID-19.
- Anthony Smith, 83, British broadcaster, author and academic, president of Magdalen College, Oxford (1988–2005), renal failure.
- Mira J. Spektor, 93, German-born American composer and poet.
- Jiří Srnec, 90, Czech theatre director and artist.
- Jolene Unsoeld, 89, American politician, member of the Washington (1985–1989) and the U.S. Houses of Representatives (1989–1995).
- Herman-Hartmut Weyel, 88, German politician, mayor of Mainz (1987–1997).
- Sir Frank Williams, 79, British motor racing team owner and constructor (Williams Racing).

=== 29 ===
- Constance Ahrons, 84, American psychotherapist, assisted suicide.
- Jagdish Lal Ahuja, 86, Indian social worker, cancer.
- Otis Anderson Jr., 23, American football player (UCF Knights), shot.
- Kinza Clodumar, 76, Nauruan politician, MP (1971–1979, 1983–1989, 1995–2003) and president (1997–1998).
- Arlene Dahl, 96, American actress (Journey to the Center of the Earth, A Southern Yankee, Reign of Terror).
- Don Demeter, 86, American baseball player (Los Angeles Dodgers, Philadelphia Phillies, Detroit Tigers).
- William Fulco, 85, American Jesuit priest.
- Jim Gerhardt, 92, American Olympic triple jumper (1952).
- David Gulpilil, 68, Australian actor (Walkabout, Charlie's Country, Crocodile Dundee), lung cancer.
- Mike Holland, 65, American professional golfer.
- Howard Honig, 90, American actor (Airplane!, Airplane II: The Sequel, Dark Shadows).
- LaMarr Hoyt, 66, American baseball player (Chicago White Sox, San Diego Padres), cancer.
- Nurul Islam Jihadi, 73, Bangladeshi Islamic scholar, secretary general of Hefazat-e-Islam Bangladesh (since 2020).
- Bruce William Kauffman, 86, American jurist, judge of the U.S. District Court for Eastern Pennsylvania (1997–2009).
- Bob Kilger, 77, Canadian politician, MP (1988–2004) and mayor of Cornwall (2006–2014), stomach cancer.
- Jack Lemley, 86, American architect and engineering manager (Channel Tunnel).
- Frits Louer, 90, Dutch footballer (NOAD, Willem II, national team).
- Jake Millar, 26, New Zealand entrepreneur and businessman, suicide.
- Vladimir Naumov, 93, Russian film director (The Wind, Peace to Him Who Enters, Teheran 43), screenwriter and producer.
- Allan Rechtschaffen, 93, American sleep researcher.
- Ayako Shirasaki, 52, Japanese-American jazz pianist and composer, cancer.
- Robert Farris Thompson, 88, American art historian and writer, Parkinson's disease complicated by COVID-19.
- Alexander Zaitsev, 76, Russian astronomer.
- Muhammad Ziauddin, 83, Pakistani journalist (Pakistan & Gulf Economist, The News International, The Express Tribune).
- Sandor Zicherman, 86, Hungarian artist.

=== 30 ===
- Sir Max Bingham, 94, Australian politician, deputy premier of Tasmania (1982–1984).
- Marie-Claire Blais, 82, Canadian writer (Mad Shadows, A Season in the Life of Emmanuel) and poet.
- Oriol Bohigas, 95, Spanish architect (MBM Arquitectes) and urban planner, Barcelona city councilor (1991–1994) and president of Fundació Joan Miró (1981–1988).
- H. Jackson Brown Jr., 81, American author.
- Albert Bustamante, 86, American judge and politician, member of the U.S. House of Representatives (1985–1993).
- Barney Carr, 98, Northern Irish Gaelic footballer (Warrenpoint).
- Sirisena Cooray, 90, Sri Lankan politician, mayor of Colombo (1979–1989), MP (1989–1994) and minister of housing (1989–1994).
- Chuck Dobson, 77, American baseball player (Oakland Athletics, California Angels).
- Dave Draper, 79, American bodybuilder, actor (Lord Love a Duck, Don't Make Waves), and author, heart failure.
- Phil Dwyer, 68, Welsh footballer (Cardiff City, national team).
- Frank Elm, 92, American swimmer.
- Patrocinio González Garrido, 87, Mexican politician, senator (1982–1988), governor of Chiapas (1988–1993), and secretary of the interior (1993–1994).
- Peter Greenwood, 97, English footballer (Chester City) and cricketer (Lancashire).
- Janis Hansen, 81, American talent manager and actress (The Odd Couple).
- Philip Heymann, 89, American lawyer, deputy attorney general (1993–1994).
- Rafiqul Islam, 87, Bangladeshi educationist, president of Bangla Academy (since 2021), chairman of Nazrul Institute (since 2018) and vice-chancellor of JUST (2008–2009).
- Ray Kennedy, 70, English footballer (Liverpool, Arsenal, national team), complications from Parkinson's disease.
- Stan Kwan, 54, American football coach (San Diego Chargers, Detroit Lions, San Francisco 49ers), heart attack.
- Pampi Laduche, 66, French Basque pelota player.
- Marcus Lamb, 64, American televangelist, founder of Daystar, COVID-19.
- Mary Maher, 81, American-born Irish trade unionist, feminist and journalist.
- Edison Misla Aldarondo, 79, Puerto Rican politician, member (1977–2002) and speaker (1993–2000) of the House of Representatives.
- C. Herbert Oliver, 96, American pastor and civil rights activist.
- Jonathan Penrose, 88, English chess player.
- John Pett, 94, British television producer and director.
- Ernesta G. Procope, 98, American investment banker.
- Klaus Reinhardt, 80, German military officer.
- Charles Revet, 84, French politician, senator (1995–2019).
- Klaus Rainer Röhl, 92, German journalist and author.
- Kal Rudman, 91, American disc jockey, color commentator and philanthropist, cofounder of the Kal and Lucille Rudman Foundation.
- Sirivennela Seetharama Sastry, 66, Indian lyricist (Sirivennela, Swarnakamalam, Nuvvostanante Nenoddantana), lung cancer.
- John Seddon, 86, New Zealand politician.
- John Sillett, 85, English football player (Chelsea, Coventry City) and manager (Hereford United).
- David Smith, 81, English cricketer (Derbyshire, Orange Free State).
- Pamela Helen Stephen, 57, British mezzo-soprano, cancer.
- Marjorie Tallchief, 95, American ballerina.
- Jože Urankar, 82, Slovenian Olympic weightlifter (1972). (death announced on this date)
- Joseph Wayas, 80, Nigerian politician, president of the senate (1979–1983).
- Erwin Wilczek, 81, Polish football player (Górnik Zabrze, Valenciennes, national team) and manager.
- G. Yafit, 70, Israeli advertising executive, cancer.
