= Jung-dong =

Jung-dong, Jungdong, or 중동 can refer to:

== Places in South Korea ==
=== Wards ===
- Jung-dong, Mapo-gu, Seoul
- Jung-dong, Haeundae-gu, Busan
- Jung-dong, Suseong-gu, Daegu
- Jung-dong, Dong-gu, Daejeon
- Jung-dong, Wonmi-gu, Bucheon City, Gyeonggi-do
- Jung-dong, Paldal-gu, Suwon City, Gyeonggi-do
- Jung-dong, Giheung-gu, Yongin City, Gyeonggi-do
- Jung-dong, Gongju City, Chungcheongnam-do
- Jung-dong, Gunsan City, Jeollabuk-do
- Jung-dong, Wansan-gu, Jeongju City, Jeollabuk-do
- Jung-dong, Gwangyang City, Jeollanam-do
- Jung-dong, Mokpo City, Jeollanam-do
- Jung-dong, Uichang-gu, Changwon City, Gyeongsangnam-do
- Jungdong-myeon, Yeongwol, Yeongwol County, Gangwon-do
- Jungdong-myeon, Sangju City, Gyeongsangbuk-do

=== Landmarks ===
- Jung-dong station (Bucheon), in Bucheon, Gyeonggi Province
- Jung-dong station (Busan Metro), in Busan
- Jungdong High School, in Daegu,

== Other uses ==
- Kwon Jung-dong (1932–2021), South Korean politician
- Korean for the Middle East geopolitical region
