= Killing of Muhammad Zada =

Pakistani anti-drug activist (died 2021)

Muhammad Zada Agra
- Born: 1988/1989
- Died: 8 November 2021; Sakhakot, Malakand District, Khyber Pakhtunkhwa, Pakistan
- Cause of death: Assassination by gunshot
- Occupations: Anti-drug activist, blogger
- Known for: Speaking out against drug trafficking and crime in Malakand District

Muhammad Zada Agra (Pashto: محمد زاده اګره; 1988/1989 – 8 November 2021) was an anti-drug activist and blogger in Malakand district of Khyber Pakhtunkhwa. He was shot dead on 8 November 2021 by unknown gunmen in Sakhakot area of Malakand District.

According to the FIR, unidentified persons came on a motorcycle and shot at him. He had spoken to the Deputy Commissioner of Malakand district in an Open court a few days ago against the drug mafia in the area.

== Protests ==
People have been protesting on the main road of Sakhakot Malakand since this morning against the assassination of Mohammad Zada and demanding that those responsible for Mohammad Zada's murder be identified and brought to justice.

== Investigation ==
Chief Minister of Khyber Pakhtunkhwa Advisor Riaz Khan said that the Chief Minister Mahmood Khan had taken notice of the murder of Mohammad Zada Agra and had asked the Khyber Pakhtunkhwa Police Chief Moazzam Jah Ansari to report it.

The Khyber Pakhtunkhwa chief minister has ordered the removal of Malakand deputy commissioner Altaf Ahmed and assistant commissioner Fawad Khattak.

According to the Malakand administration, a case of murder of Muhammadzada Agra has been registered against unknown persons and according to Commissioner Swat, a joint investigation team has been formed to investigate the murder.

=== Allegation ===
He posted on his Facebook account on 12 October. In it, Mohammad Zada had alleged that "Deputy Commissioner Malakand is trying to harass me under the plan and conspiracy of my opponents and political circles." The post further states, "If anything happens to me as a result of this plan and improper implementation of this 'unholy conspiracy', then the entire claim of my family will be on Deputy Commissioner Malakand."

=== Murders arrest ===
On 15 November 2021, Deputy Commissioner Malakand Anwar-ul-Haq presented the two accused involved in the murder of Muhammadzada to the media. Weapons and a motorcycle used in the incident were also recovered from the possession of the accused.

The Deputy Commissioner said that the Muhammadzada murder case was a big challenge and it took a long time to arrest the accused but with the joint efforts of the forensic team and intelligence agencies, their arrest was carried out.

== Personal life ==
Muhammad Zada was known as a political and social activist in Malakand and Sakhakot. As a student, he was the president of the Insaf Students Federation Malakand and a fan of Prime Minister Imran Khan. Even after entering practical life, he remained associated with the PTI, but gained more fame for speaking out against drug trafficking and crime in the area. He not only used social media but also used harsh language against the local administration and drug dealers in public gatherings.

== Reactions ==
The Director-General of UNESCO, Audrey Azoulay and Committee to Protect Journalists have condemned the killing.
