= Poerio Mascella =

Italian footballer (died 2021)

Personal information
- Date of birth: 1949 or 1950
- Date of death: 1 November 2021 (aged 71)
- Position: Goalkeeper

Senior career*
Years	Team	Apps	(Gls)
- Pistoiese
- * Club domestic league appearances and goals

Poerio Mascella (1949/1950 – 1 November 2021) was an Italian professional footballer who played as a goalkeeper for Pistoiese.
