= Sakhakot =

Coordinates: 34°27′26″N 71°54′31″E

- Local city of District Malakand.
- Interactive map of Sakhakot
- Country: Pakistan
- Province: Khyber Pakhtunkhwa
- District: Malakand
- Time zone: UTC+5 (PST)

Sakhakot is a local city of Malakand District in the Khyber Pakhtunkhwa province of Pakistan. It's the gateway of district Malakand as well as the Malakand division. The name of Sakhakot is derived from two words, "Sakha" and "Kot" which means "fort of generosity". People of Sakhakot are historically best known for their hospitality and generosity. The area is termed as a fort because of it providing safety to those who sought asylum who were believed to be enemies of the state.

One of the elders, Shahi Baba of Yousafzai tribe proclaimed that nobody dare touch the people who are once given protection. Shahi Baba of Shalman Rais Branch was also known for his guerilla war against the British. He was effective fighting the British invaders by joining hands with Sartor Faqir who was later on killed in action. This was a setback and the British strengthened their camp in Kharki village.

At present it is famous for its handmade weapons industry.

The District of Malakand has 3 tehsils i.e. Swat Rani Zai, Sam Rani Zai, and Thana Baizai. Each tehsil comprises certain numbers of Union councils. There are 28 union councils in district Malakand.

== See also ==
- Malakand District
