= Flip Stapper =

Dutch footballer (1944–2021)

Personal information
- Date of birth: 23 November 1944
- Place of birth: Amsterdam, Netherlands
- Date of death: 4 November 2021 (aged 76)
- Place of death: Graft, Netherlands
- Position: Midfielder

Senior career*
Years	Team	Apps	(Gls)
1962–1965	Blauw-Wit Amsterdam		
1965–1968	Heracles		
1968–1969	FC Twente	6	(0)
1969–1974	AZ'67		
- KFC
- * Club domestic league appearances and goals

Flip Stapper (23 November 1944 – 4 November 2021) was a Dutch professional footballer who played as a midfielder for Blauw-Wit Amsterdam, Heracles, FC Twente, AZ'67 and KFC.
