= Minoru Hara =

Japanese Indoligist (1930–2021)

Minoru HARA
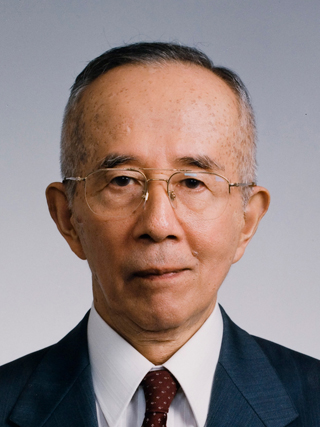
- Born: 9 September 1930; Tokyo, Japan
- Died: 1 November 2021 (aged 91)
- Other name: 原 實
- Occupations: Writer; Indologist; Philologist; Scholar
- Known for: Sanskrit and Buddhist literature
- Awards: Padma Bhushan

Minoru Hara (原 實, Hara Minoru; 9 September 1930 – 1 November 2021) was a Japanese writer, Indologist, philologist, and a scholar of Sanskrit and Buddhist literature and philosophy.

== Biography ==
Hara was a professor emeritus at the University of Tokyo. His writings include Words for Love in Sanskrit, Tapas in the Smriti Literature, Pasupata Doctrine as Transmitted by Vedantins and A Note on Purna-Kumbha . Budda charita budda no shoÌ"gai, Memorial Ojihara Yutaka Studia Indologica and Studies on Indian philosophy and literature in Japan, 1973-1983 are some his other publications. He is an elected member of the Japan Academy (2000). The Government of India awarded him the third highest civilian honour of the Padma Bhushan, in 2009, for his contributions to Indian literature and education. Harānandalaharī (Volume in Honour of Prof. Minoru Hara) is a book published by Pietro Chierichetti in honor of Hara.

Hara died on 1 November 2021, at the age of 91.

== See also ==
- Japan Academy
