= Kim Young-jung =

South Korean politician (1929–2021)

Minister of Political Affairs
- In office 5 December 1988 – 18 March 1990
- Preceded by: Kyong-hui Cho
- Succeeded by: Lee Gye-soon

Member of the National Assembly of South Korea
- In office 13 May 1985 – 29 May 1988

Personal details
- Born: 5 October 1929 Hamhung, Korea, Empire of Japan
- Died: 22 November 2021 (aged 92)
- Party: DJP

Kim Young-jung (Korean: 김영정; 5 October 1929 – 22 November 2021) was a South Korean politician. A member of the Democratic Justice Party, she served in the National Assembly from 1985 to 1988 and was Minister of Political Affairs from 1988 to 1990.
