= Karel Havlík =

Czech politician (1944–2021)

Minister without portfolio
- In office 11 May 1990 – 27 June 1990

Personal details
- Born: 6 August 1944 Mutěnice, Protectorate of Bohemia and Moravia
- Died: 17 November 2021 (aged 77)
- Party: KDU-ČSL

Karel Havlík (6 August 1944 – 17 November 2021) was a Czech politician. A member of KDU-ČSL, he was a minister without portfolio in the Czech and Slovak Federative Republic in 1990.
