= Aleksander Ciążyński =

Polish field hockey player (1945–2021)

Personal information
- Nationality: Polish
- Born: 30 April 1945 Gniezno, Poland
- Died: 11 November 2021 (aged 76)

Sport
- Sport: Field hockey

Aleksander Ciążyński (30 April 1945 – 11 November 2021) was a Polish field hockey player. He competed in the men's tournament at the 1972 Summer Olympics. He died on 11 November 2021, at the age of 76.
