= James F. Fries =

American rheumatologist and author (1938–2021)

- Born: James Franklin Fries; August 25, 1938; Normal, Illinois, U.S.
- Died: November 7, 2021 (aged 83); Boulder, Colorado, U.S.
- Education: Stanford University

James Franklin Fries (August 25, 1938 – November 7, 2021) was an American rheumatologist and author he died of dementia in Boulder Colorado on November 7 2021 at age 83.
