= Herman LeRoy Emmet =

American photojournalist and visual artist (1943–2021)

Herman LeRoy Emmet III (January 21, 1943 – November 4, 2021) was an American photojournalist and visual artist. His best known work was "Fruit Tramps: A Family of Migrant Farmworkers". Two of his photographs from this body of work are part of the permanent collection of the Museum of Modern Art in New York City. In 1988, Emmet won the Top Photo Essayist award in the "Pictures of the Year" contest, cosponsored by the National Press Photographers Association and the University of Missouri School of Journalism, for his seven-year project documenting the life of a migrant farm working family, the Tindals.

== Life and work ==
Herman LeRoy Emmet was born in Wareham, Massachusetts on January 21, 1943. He attended Georgetown University where he obtained a Bachelor of Arts degree in Languages and Linguistics and later attended MICA, where he earned a Master of Fine Arts in Photography.

Influenced by the work of photographers such as Manuel Álvarez Bravo, Walker Evans and Dorothea Lange, Emmet first encountered the subjects of "Fruit Tramps", the Tindal family, in 1979. "I began photographing the migrant stream as a project for the Brooklyn Museum in 1977...but I found I wanted to know more about it. Every once in a while, I'd run across a white family that reminded me of photographic history from 50 years ago". In 1979, a migrant clinic in North Carolina introduced Emmet to the Tindal family. The head of the family, L.H. Tindal, agreed to allow Emmet to document the family's life under the condition that Emmet both live and work alongside them. In 1988, after spending seven years on and off living and working with the Tindals, Life Magazine featured Emmet's "Fruit Tramps" series in a 6-page spread.

In 2010, Emmet was diagnosed with Parkinson's disease. In the years following, he has been dedicated to painting and has exhibited in several shows.

In 2019, selected photographs from "Fruit Tramps" were exhibited at the Key West Photography Festival and he was presented with a Lifetime Achievement Award. Emmet was able to attend the event with his wife and, despite occasional difficulty with speaking due to Parkinson's, gave a 45-minute talk about the seven-year project which culminated in the book, "Fruit Tramps".
