= Frank R. Pfetsch =

German political scientist (1936–2021)

Frank Pfetsch (2 September 1936 – 18 November 2021) was Professor of International Politics Emeritus at the Faculty of Economic and Social Sciences of the University of Heidelberg.

== Education ==
Pfetsch studied Political Science and Economics at German and foreign universities. He received his Ph.D. in political science in 1965 and his habilitation in 1973 at the University of Heidelberg.

== Career ==
After graduating with a Ph.D., Pfetsch worked in German and foreign research institutes and in the German Ministry of Science and Research. He acted as a consultant of UNESCO on science policy issues in countries in Asia, Africa and Latin America. He has been Professor of Political Science with Special Reference to International Politics at the University of Heidelberg since 1976. He held visiting professorships at the University of Pittsburgh, Kyung Hee University in Seoul and at Leipzig University. In 1995 he held the Chaire Elie Halevy and Chaire Alfred Grosser at the Institut d'Etudes Politiques, Paris. Since 1999 he has held the Jean-Monnet Chair at the University of Heidelberg.

== Awards and offices ==
Member of the Board of the Research Committee on the Sociology of Science, "International Sociological Association" (1974-1980). Scientific Curator of the Heidelberg Institute of International Conflict Research (HIIK). Member of the executive committee of the "European Consortium for Political Research" (1997–2003). Member of the Steering Committee of the International Studies in Europe of the European Consortium for Political Research (1990-2000). Member of the Advisory Board des "Sino-European Institutes" in Shanghai, China. Advisory Board Member of the "Centre for Study of Democracy" of the University of Westminster. Member of the "Cycladic Academy for Europe", Tinos/Greece.

== Books ==
Pfetsch was the author or editor of books including:

- Das neue Europa. Wiesbaden: VS Verlag für Sozialwissenschaften, 2007.
- Verhandlung in Konflikten. Grundlagen-Theorie-Praxis. Wiesbaden: VS Verlag für Sozialwissenschaften, 2006.
- Die Europäische Union (3rd ed.). München: UTB, 2005.
- Theoretiker der Politik. Von Platon bis Habermas. München: Fink/UTB, 2003.
- National and International Conflicts, 1945-1995: New Empirical and Theoretical Approaches. With Christoph Rohloff. New York: Routledge, 2000.
- La politique internationale. Brussels: Bruylant, 2000.
- Dimensionen des Politischen. In three volumes. Darmstadt: Wissenschaftliche Buchgesselschaft, 1995.
- Internationale Politik. Stuttgart: Verlag W. Kohlhammer, 1994.
- Konflikte seit 1945. Freiburg/Würzburg: Verlag Ploetz, 1991.
- West Germany: Internal Structures and External Relations: Foreign Policy of the Federal Republic of Germany. New York: Praeger, 1988.
- Verfassungsreden und Verfassungsentwürfe. Länderverfassungen 1946—1953. Frankfurt: Verlag Peter Lang, 1986.
- Verfassungspolitik der Nachkriegszeit. Darmstadt: Wissenschaftliche Buchgesselschaft, 1985.
- Die Außenpolitik der Bundesrepublik 1949—1980. Munich: Fink Verlag, 1981.
- Zur Entwicklung der Wissenschaftspolitik in Deutschland, 1750-1914. Berlin: Duncker & Humblot, 1974.
