= Jim Arnold (Missouri politician) =

American politician (1935–2021)

James D. Arnold

Member of the Missouri House of Representatives
- In office 1965–1976

Personal details
- Born: January 7, 1935 South Bend, Indiana
- Died: November 4, 2021 (aged 86) Springfield, Missouri
- Party: Democratic
- Spouse(s): Kathy Doyle (m. 1964), Wilma Phillips (m. 1996)
- Children: 2 sons
- Occupation: accountant

James "Jim" D. Arnold (January 7, 1935 – November 4, 2021) was an American politician who served in the Missouri House of Representatives. He was first elected to the Missouri House of Representatives in 1964. He was educated at Isaac C. Elston High School in Michigan City, Indiana; Tri-State College in Angola, Indiana; and the University of Missouri-Columbia.

In 1958, he was drafted into the U.S. Army and served at Fort Leonard Wood in Missouri and Camp McCoy in Wisconsin auditing non-appropriated funds. After serving in the U.S. Army, he moved to Waynesville, Missouri, near Fort Leonard Wood. He married Kathy Doyle in 1964; they had two sons. After his first wife died, he married Wilma Phillips in 1996.
