= Yūji Tokizaki =

Japanese politician (1940–2021)

- 時崎 雄司

Member of the House of Representatives
- In office 18 February 1990 – 18 June 1993
- Preceded by: Nobumitsu Tsukada
- Succeeded by: Nobumitsu Tsukada
- Constituency: Ibaraki 1st

Personal details
- Born: 6 January 1940 Aomori Prefecture, Japan
- Died: 13 November 2021 (aged 81) Shirosato, Ibaraki, Japan
- Party: Socialist
- Other political affiliations: DP 1996 (1996–1998); DPJ (1998–2016); DP 2016 (2016–2018); DPP (2018–2021)

Yūji Tokizaki (Japanese: 時崎 雄司 Tokizako Yuji; 6 January 1940 – 13 November 2021) was a Japanese politician. A member of the Japan Socialist Party, he served in the House of Representatives from 1990 to 1993.
