= Allin Vlasenko =

Ukrainian conductor (1938–2021)

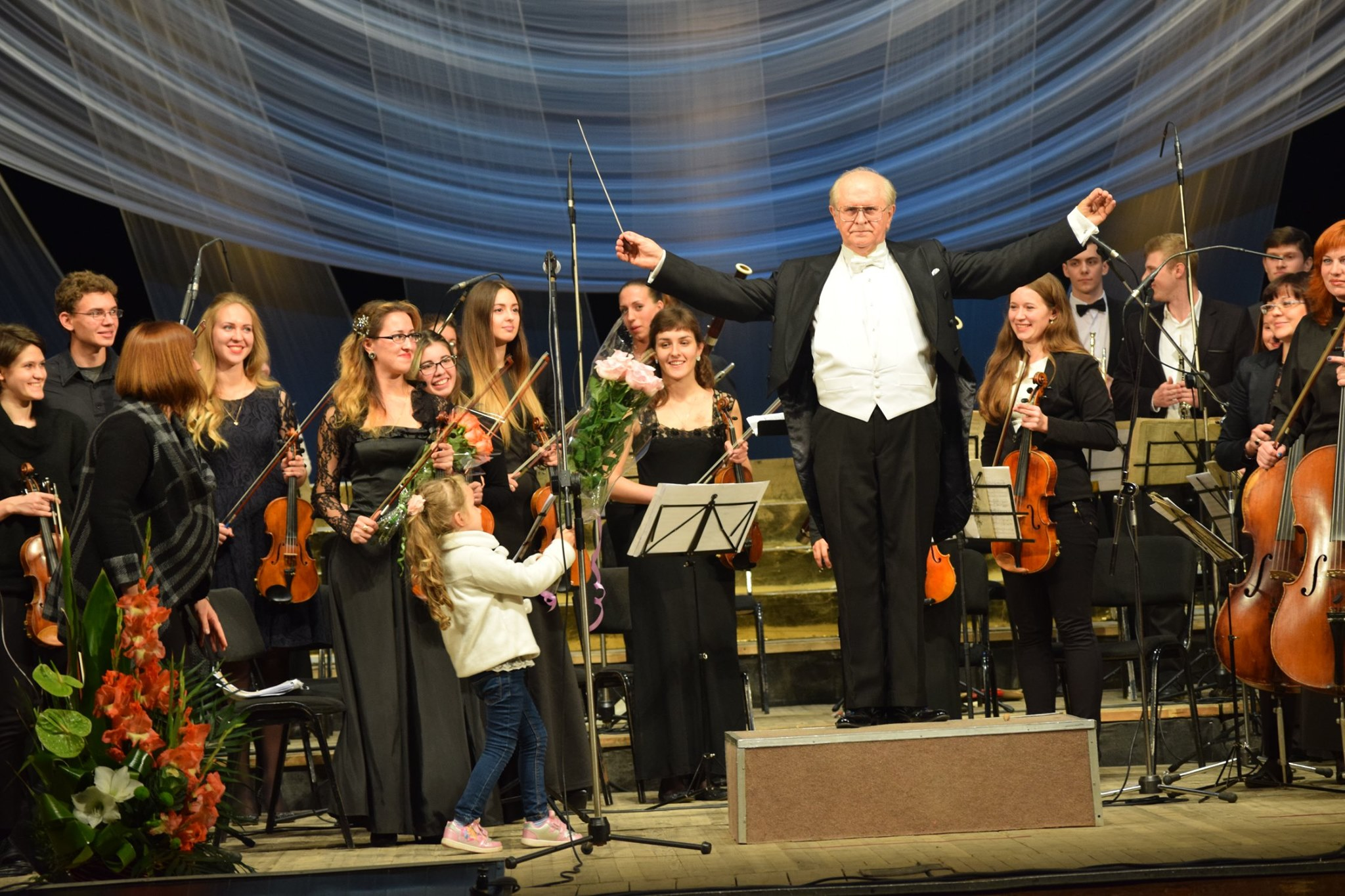
- Vlasenko (center) in 2016
- Born: 30 June 1938; Chelyabinsk, Russian SFSR, Soviet Union
- Died: 23 November 2021 (aged 83)
- Occupation: Conductor

Allin Vlasenko (30 June 1938 – 23 November 2021) was a Ukrainian conductor.
