= Miran Györek =

Slovenian politician (1952–2021)

Member of the National Assembly of Slovenia
- In office 15 October 2008 – 21 December 2011

Personal details
- Born: 13 April 1952 Murska Sobota, People's Republic of Slovenia, FPR Yugoslavia
- Died: 23 November 2021 (aged 69) Ljubljana, Slovenia
- Party: SNS

Miran Györek (13 April 1952 – 23 November 2021) was a Slovenian politician. A member of the Slovenian National Party, he served in the National Assembly from 2008 to 2011.
