= John Pett =

British film director and producer (1927–2021)

Basil John Pett (23 July 1927 – 30 November 2021) was a British film director/producer active from 1954 to 1993. He is known for his documentary work on series such as The World At War, for which he directed 3 of the 26 episodes: "It's a Lovely Day Tomorrow" (the British defeat in Burma), "Pacific" (Iwo Jima etc.), and "Morning" (D-Day etc.). He died on 30 November 2021, at the age of 94.
