= Ken Lyotier =

Canadian social worker (1947–2021)

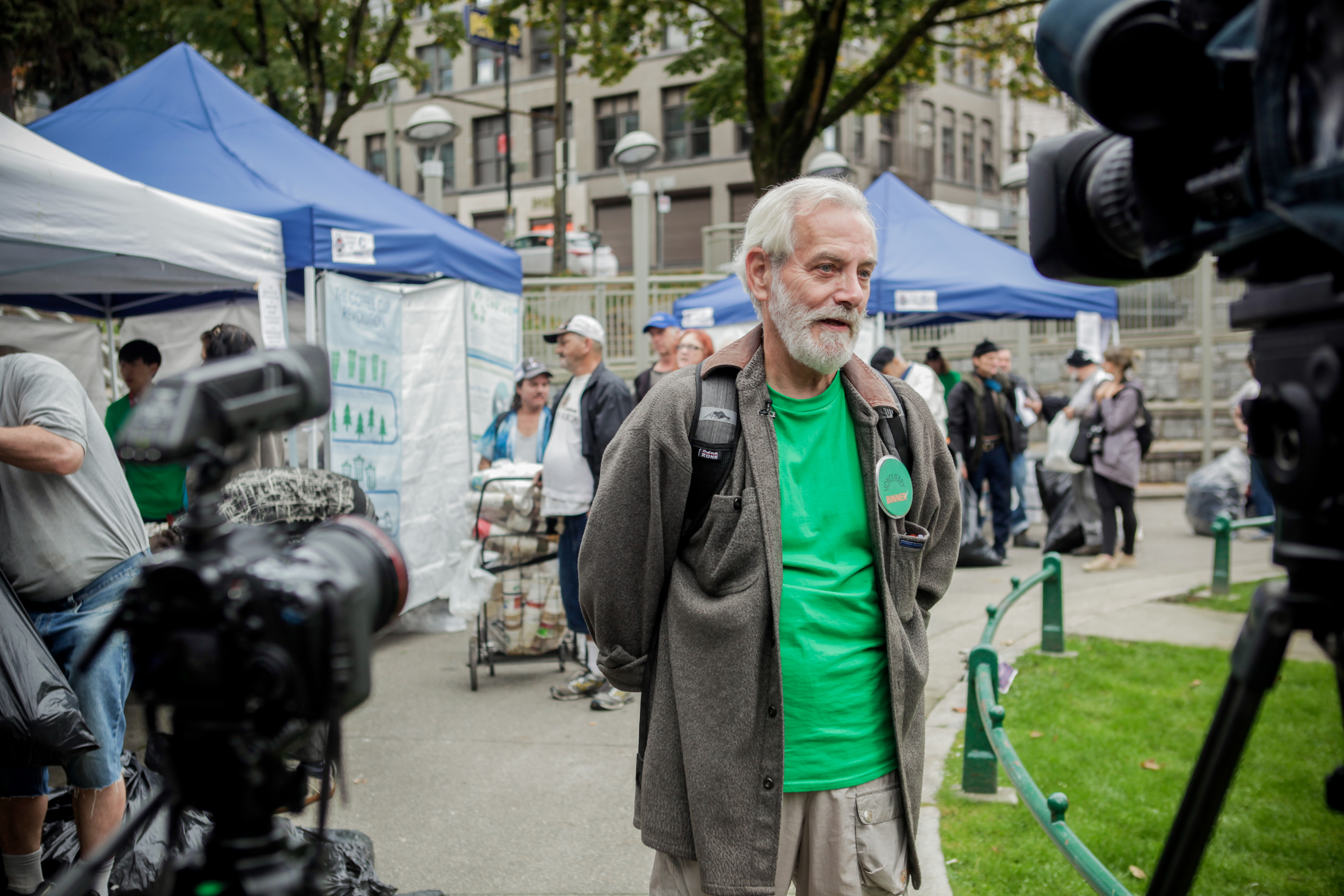
- Born: Kenneth Hugh Lyotier; February 7, 1947; North Vancouver, British Columbia
- Died: November 27, 2021 (aged 74); Vancouver, British Columbia
- Occupation: Social worker
- Known for: Recycling initiatives in Downtown Eastside neighborhood of Vancouver

Kenneth Hugh Lyotier (February 7, 1947 – November 27, 2021) was a Canadian social worker who led recycling and community development initiatives in the Downtown Eastside neighborhood of Vancouver. He started the Vancouver-based social venture United We Can which provided opportunities for binners to bring in containers for deposit refunds. He was also a founder of the Binners Project in 2016.

Lyotier received the Canadian Meritorious Service Medal in 2005, and the Queen Elizabeth II Diamond Jubilee Medal in 2012. He was also a torchbearer for the 2010 Winter Olympics in Vancouver and was the recipient of an honorary doctor of laws degree from the University of British Columbia in 2011.

== Biography ==
Lyotier was born into a working-class family on February 7, 1947 in the Lynn Valley neighborhood of North Vancouver in British Columbia. After his parents' death, he grew up with his siblings and a cousin who moved in with the family. Lyotier developed Crohn's disease, an inflammatory bowel disease, in his late teens. Recalling his early life, Lyotier would later speak about the chronic intestinal pain associated with the disease, and the frequent hospital visits that defined his growing up years. It was during this time that he was introduced to alcohol and drugs, which initially were ways to distract from the pain, but very soon became an addiction.

Addiction would lead him to a life of poverty and income assistance, which included moving to the Downtown Eastside neighborhood of Vancouver. During this time he would supplement his welfare income by dumpster diving. He continued this life until he was 40, when he had intestinal surgery that took him out of chronic pain.

Lyotier worked very closely with binners in the Downtown Eastside neighborhood, who were largely unemployed and injured members of the natural resources industry in British Columbia. In one of his first collective actions in 1991, he organized an event in Vancouver's Victory Square where he had the binners bringing all their cartpiles with beverage containers that were not eligible for refund deposits. The visuals of a huge pile of containers created a stir in the city, eventually resulting in the province introducing a universal beverage deposit and recycling system in 1998.

In 1995, Lyotier started the social venture, United We Can, in Downtown Eastside. The enterprise was intended to be a community space for binners, with additional job training being available for them as they brought along containers for recycling. As of 2021, the venture processed ~60,000 containers every day, providing $2 million to over 700 binners, and employed ~120 staffers. He launched the Binners Project in 2016. His work led to binners being recruited as 'zero-waste ambassadors' for the Pacific National Exhibition. He was also an advisor to the City of Vancouver on various issues including homelessness, de-addiction and medical services, and poverty alleviation. Lyotier was also associated with the Save Our Living Environment, a Vancouver-based organization aiming to improve urban living conditions for the homeless.

Lyotier received the Canadian Meritorious Service Medal in 2005, and the Queen Elizabeth II Diamond Jubilee Medal in 2012. He was also a torchbearer for the 2010 Winter Olympics in Vancouver. He famously took the torch with him to United We Can facility for binners to take pictures with the torch. He received an honorary doctor of laws degree from the University of British Columbia in 2011. A fund based on his name was set up with Vancity foundation to further economic inclusion and social justice initiatives in the Downtown Eastside region.

Lyotier died a medically assisted death in Vancouver on November 27, 2021. He was aged 74. He had been diagnosed with a form of cancer.
