= Fabiola Letelier =

Chilean lawyer and human rights activist (1929–2021)

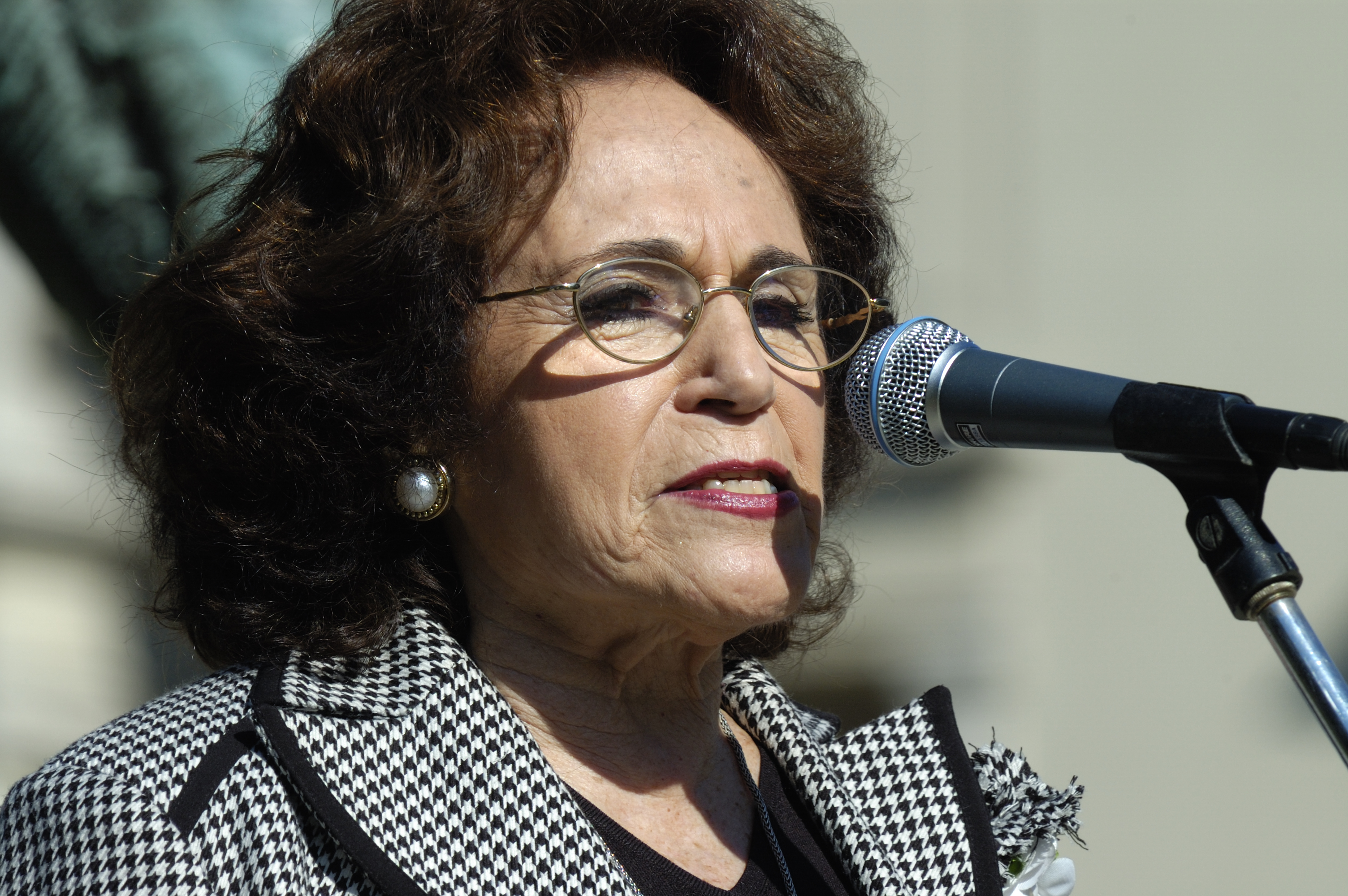
- Letelier in 2006
- Born: 17 July 1929; Temuco, Chile
- Died: 18 November 2021 (aged 92)
- Occupations: Lawyer and human rights activist

Fabiola Alicia Letelier del Solar (17 July 1929 – 18 November 2021) was a Chilean lawyer, noted for her activism and defense of human rights in Chile and Latin America. She was the founder and president of CODEPU (1980–1998), and a plaintiff lawyer in the case surrounding her brother Orlando Letelier's assassination in 1976. On 23 July 2018, she was awarded the National Human Rights Prize, awarded by the National Institute of Human Rights.

== Early life and education ==
Letelier was born 17 July 1929, in Temuco, Chile, the eldest of three children. Her father was a printer, and her mother was a poet and homemaker. She was raised largely in Santiago. She was encouraged to pursue opportunities normally closed to women, and graduated from law school at the University of Chile in 1963.

== Activism ==
Letelier became a lawyer and worked for the Organization of American States in Washington, D.C. There she was influenced by the civil rights movement. She began to focus on human rights after the 1973 Chilean coup d'état headed by Augusto Pinochet, and worked in Chile for the Vicariate of Solidarity, a Catholic human rights organization established during the Pinochet dictatorship. She took on the case of the execution of journalist Charles Horman.

Fabiola Letelier was the elder sister of Orlando Letelier, Chile's ambassador to the United States and defense minister under President Salvador Allende. As one of Chile's leading human rights lawyers, Fabiola pursued justice for her brother's assassination.

== Personal life ==
Letelier married Fernando Leiva, with whom she had four children. They later divorced. She died from complications of stroke November 18, 2021, at her home in Santiago, Chile.
