= Pakistan & Gulf Economist =

Weekly magazine

Pakistan & Gulf Economist is a weekly business magazine published from Karachi, covering the business and economy of Pakistan and the neighbouring Gulf region.

It was established in 1977 and has been regularly published ever since. It is considered one of the leading business magazines of Pakistan for over 35 years.
