= Pampi Laduche =

French Basque pelota player (1955–2021)

Pampi Laduche or Panpi Ladutxe (13 July 1955 – 30 November 2021) was a champion Basque pelota player. His father Joseph was also a well-regarded player. Pampi was the first man from French Basque Country to be Spanish champion.
