= Richard Finn (baseball) =

American baseball player and coach (1933–2021)

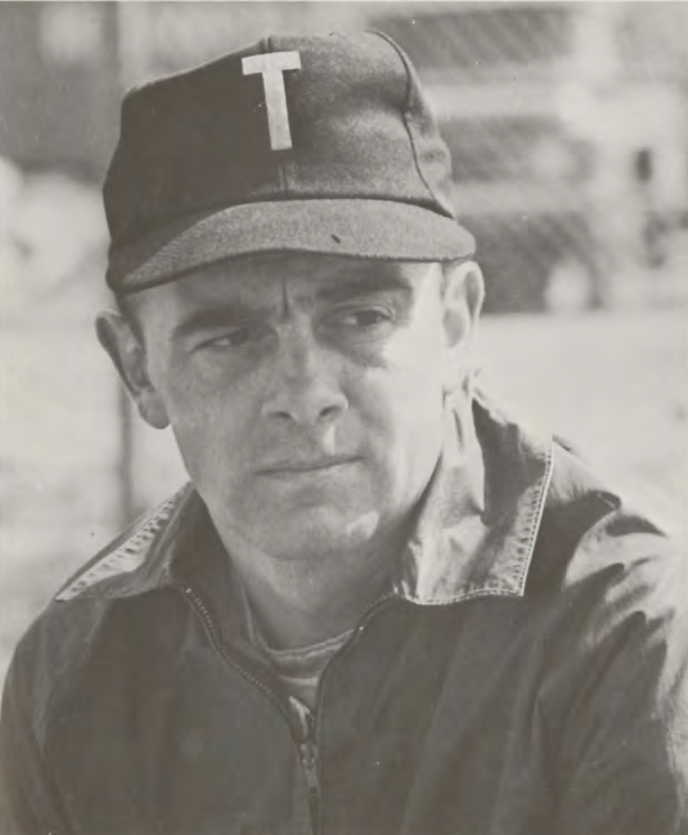
- Finn from the 1968 Blockhouse

Biographical details
- Born: March 12, 1933; Lima, Ohio, U.S.
- Died: November 16, 2021 (aged 88)

Playing career
- 1954–1955: Ohio State
- Position: Pitcher

Coaching career (HC unless noted)
- 1964–1969: Toledo
- 1976–1987: Ohio State

Richard Donald Finn Jr. (March 12, 1933 – November 16, 2021), also known as Dick Finn, was an American baseball player and coach. He grew up in Lima, Ohio, and attended Ohio State University. He was a pitcher for the Ohio State Buckeyes baseball team and captain of the 1955 team that won a Big Ten Conference championship in 1955. He graduated from Ohio State in 1955. From 1960 to 1964, he was an assistant football and basketball coach at Woodward High School in Toledo, Ohio. In August 1964, he was hired as the head baseball coach at the University of Toledo. He held that position for until 1969. In September 1969 he was hired as an assistant baseball coach at Ohio State. In May 1975, after six years as an assistant coach, he became the head baseball coach at Ohio State. He stepped down as head baseball coach in June 1987 and was appointed special assistant to Ohio State athletic director Rick Bay.

Finn died on November 16, 2021, at the age of 88.
