= Ramuntxo Camblong =

French-Basque politician (1939–2021)

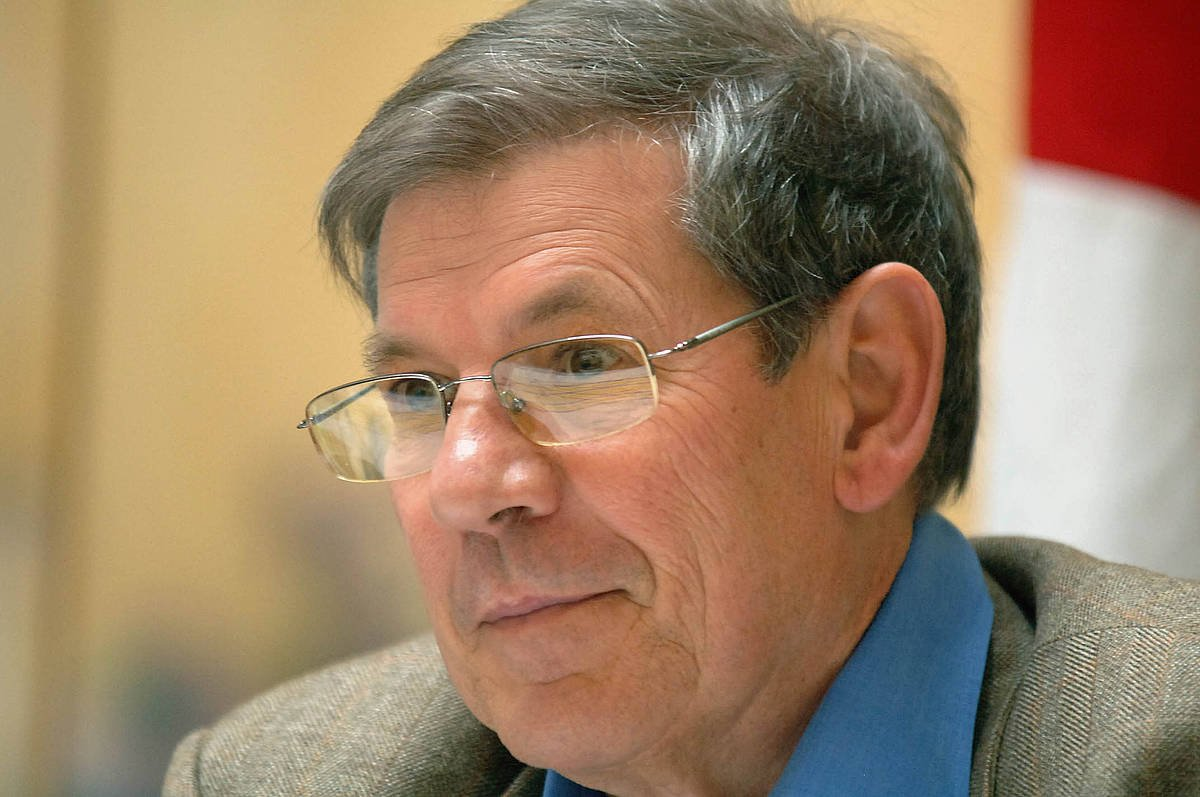
- Camblong in 2010

President of the Basque Nationalist Party of France
- In office 2004–2008

Municipal Councilor of Anglet
- In office 2001–2008

Personal details
- Born: 11 November 1939 Macaye, France
- Died: 12 November 2021 (aged 82)
- Party: Eusko Alkartasuna (1986–1994); Basque Nationalist Party (1997–2021)

Ramuntxo Camblong (Basque: Ramuntxo Kanblong; 11 November 1939 – 12 November 2021) was a French-Basque politician. He joined the Basque Nationalist Party in 1997 and was elected to the Basque Nationalist Party of France in May 2004, for which he served as President from 2004 to 2008.

== Biography ==
Camblong studied in Paris and Angers and taught electronics, mathematics, and physics in Hasparren from 1966 to 1975. He was in charge of external development for Sokoa SA from 1998 to 2002.

=== Political career ===
In 1969, Camblong co-founded Seaska alongside Claire Noblia and Manex Pagola. The organization promoted enterprises in the French Basque Country with support from the Mondragon Corporation. He was then President of the Centre culturel du Pays basque from 1984 to 1988, then of the Institut culturel basque from 1990 to 1994.

Camblong was elected to the Municipal Council of Anglet in 2001, where he served until 2008. During his time in office, he served as a delegate on the Agglomération Côte Basque-Adour. He was also notably President of the Basque Nationalist Party of France from 2004 to 2008.

Ramuntxo Camblong died on 12 November 2021, at the age of 82.

== Awards ==
- Eusko Ikaskuntza-Ville de Bayonne Prize of Honour (2012)
