= Jorge Cervós-Navarro =

Spanish physician (1930–2021)

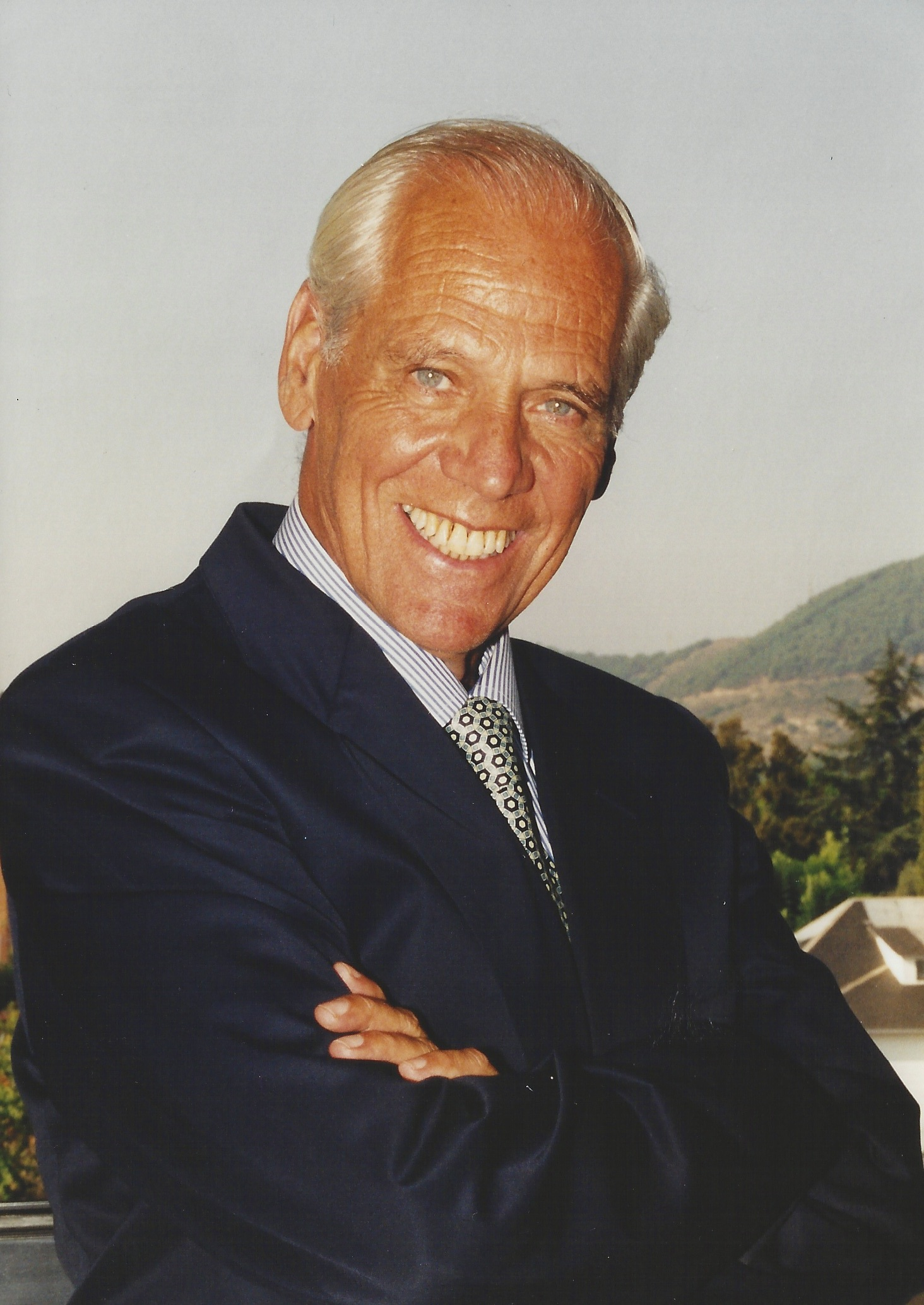
- Born: 9 January 1930; Barcelona, Spain
- Died: 14 November 2021 (aged 91)
- Education: University of Barcelona
- Awards: Creu de Sant Jordi Award (2002); Officer's Cross (Verdienstkreuz 1. Klasse)
- Scientific career
- Fields: Neuroscience
- Workplaces: Since 1968 Chair of Institute of Neuropathology, Free University of Berlin

Jorge Cervós-Navarro (vel Jordi Cervós i Navarro; 9 January 1930 – 14 November 2021) was a Spanish pathologist, histologist, and neuroscientist.

== Life ==
Studied medicine at the Universities of Barcelona and Zaragossa. PhD University Complutense of Madrid (1956). Since 1968 Chair of Institute of Neuropathology, Free University of Berlin. Has been Dean of the Faculty of Medicine at the above-mentioned University. Member of the Council of the International Society of Neuropathology and Executive President of the German Society of Neuropathology and Neuroanatomy. Has also been Rector of the International University of Catalonia from the year of its foundation in 1997 until 2001. He has published various handbooks about his specialty, translated into various languages. Doctor honoris causa from the University of Zaragoza (1984), University of Barcelona, University Complutense of Madrid, Leibniz University Hannover (Germany), University of Tokushima (Japan), University Saransk (Russia) and Aristotle University of Thessaloniki (Greece).

== Works ==
- Pathology of Cerebral Microcirculation Ed. de Gruyter, Berlin-New York, 1974 ISBN 9783110044720
- Estudio al microscopio electrónico del ganglio raquídeo normal y después de la ciaticotomía Ed. CSIC, Madrid, 1979. ISBN 9788400006983
- Metabolic and Degenerative Diseases of the Central Nervous System: Pathology, Biochemistry, and Genetics Ed. Academic Press, 1995, San Diego, ISBN 9780121652500
- Cerebral Microcirculation and Metabolism
- Neuropathology and Neuropharmacology

== See also ==
- Pathology
- List of pathologists
