= Mieczysław Szostek =

Polish doctor and politician (1933–2021)

Member of the Sejm of the Polish People's Republic
- In office 13 October 1985 – 3 June 1989

Chairman of the Presidium of the National Council of the Capital City of Warsaw
- In office 1981–1990
- Preceded by: Alojzy Karkoszka
- Succeeded by: position abolished

Personal details
- Born: 20 September 1933 Legionowo, Poland
- Died: 16 November 2021 (aged 88) Warsaw, Poland
- Party: Independent

Mieczysław Szostek (20 September 1933 – 16 November 2021) was a Polish doctor and politician.

== Biography ==
An independent, he served on the Sejm of the Polish People's Republic from 1985 to 1989 and was Chairman of the Presidium of the National Council of the Capital City of Warsaw from 1981 to 1990.
