= Dino Pedriali =

Italian photographer (1950–2021)

Dino Pedriali (1950 – 11 November 2021) was an Italian photographer who lived and worked in Rome. His subjects were the male nude as well as portraits. His work was compared by art critic Peter Weiermair during the retrospective "Nudi e Ritratti — Fotografie dal 1974/2003" to Caravaggio's because he similarly focused on the artistic elevation of people from the working class.

Photographed by Pedriali were people like Giacomo Manzù, Giorgio de Chirico, Alberto Moravia, Federico Fellini, Rudolf Nureyev, Andy Warhol, Man Ray, and Pier Paolo Pasolini, whom he photographed shortly before Pasolini's 1975 death.

== Books about Pedriali ==
- Peter Weiermair: Dino Pedriali. Edition Stemmle, Zurich, 1994. 128 pp. ISBN 3-905514-38-9
