= Ernesta G. Procope =

American investment banker (1923–2021)

Ernesta Gertrude Procope (née Forster) (2 September 1923 – 30 November 2021) was an American investment banker and insurance executive who was the head of the largest insurance agency run by a Black woman. Ernesta Gertrude Forster was born on Feb. 9, 1923, in Brooklyn and was raised in Bedford-Stuyvesant to immigrants from the West Indies. As a child, she played the piano and performed once at Carnegie Hall. She graduated from the High School of Music and Art.

She founded the commercial insurance brokerage firm E. G. Bowman, Inc. in 1953, naming it after her husband who had died the previous year. In 1977, E. G. Bowman became the first African American owned business to be located on Wall Street. Procope worked on policies for local small businesses and homeowners and advocated for Black Americans who were refused insurance by other agencies. Her efforts led to New York becoming the first stat to enact FAIR (Fair Access to Insurance Requirements) Plan legislation, which 26 have adopted.

She was also the chairperson of the board of directors at Adelphi University. An investigation of the school's finances showed that it was a customer of E. G. Bowman. For this conflict of interest, she, the president, and sixteen other members of the board were removed from their posts.

In 1972, she presented with the Woman of the Year Award by then First Lady, Pat Nixon.

She died on 30 November 2021, in Queens, New York, at the age of 98.
