= Anne Emerman =

American disability rights activist (1937–2021)

Emerman in 1990

Anne Emerman (February 24, 1937 in Astoria, Queens – November 3, 2021) was an American disability rights activist. She served as the director of the New York City Mayor's Office for Disabilities (MOPD) during the administration of David Dinkins after successfully lobbying for all new or renovated buildings in New York City to be wheelchair accessible.

In 1944, she contracted polio after playing in the water at the Jersey Shore and thereafter used a wheelchair. She attended Hunter College and received a degree in political science, and in 1964 obtained a master's degree in social work from the Columbia University School of Social Work. After graduation, she worked as a psychiatric social worker at Bellevue until 1972.

Emerman began her activism in the 1970s, at the beginning of the disability rights movement. She demanded that polling booths be accessible as although she could vote by post she wanted the community and politicians to see that those with disabilities were part of the electorate. This resulted in $10 million being spent on improvements.

In 1987, she successfully lobbied for all new or renovated buildings in New York City to be wheelchair accessible. In 1990, she became the director of the New York City Mayor's Office of the Handicapped, which later became the Mayor's Office for People With Disabilities.

In this role, she opposed a project headed by Mother Teresa to convert two tenements into a homeless shelter until the nuns agreed to install an elevator. The nuns decided not to move forward with the project, because the Catholic Church did not have the money. Opinions were divided on the outcome which some saw as a victory for disability rights while others saw it as "trumping common sense". She held the position in the New York City Mayor's Office until 1994.

== Personal life ==
In 1970, Emerman married research chemist Sidney Emerman. They met on a street corner where Sidney offered to help Anne cross the street. The couple later founded the Disabled In Action (D.I.A.) Singers, and the group sang about their struggle for universal access and supportive services.
