= Raif Nagm =

Jordanian civil engineer and politician (1926–2021)

Minister of Public Works and Housing
- In office 1 October 1984 – 4 March 1985

Minister of Awqaf Islamic Affairs and Holy Places
- In office 1991–?
- Preceded by: Ibrahim Zeid Keilani
- Succeeded by: Izz Al-Din Al-Tamimi

Personal details
- Born: 1926 Emirate of Transjordan
- Died: 24 November 2021 (aged 94–95) Oman
- Occupation: Civil engineer

Raif Nagm (Arabic: رائف نجم; 1926 – 24 November 2021) was a Jordanian civil engineer and politician.

== Biography ==
He served as Minister of Public Works and Housing from 1984 to 1985 and was also Minister of Awqaf Islamic Affairs and Holy Places.
