= John Challifour =

British mathematical physicist

John Challifour (June 13, 1938 – November 27, 2021) was a professor of mathematical physics at Indiana University's Bloomington campus. He was known among the math students of the university for his wry sense of humor and clear teaching style.

He was British-born (Bristol, 1938) but studied in the U. S. (Cincinnati), taking his bachelors (with highest honors) at Berkeley, before earning his PhD from Cambridge University in 1963. He taught in Boston (Brandeis) and at Princeton University before moving to Bloomington with his wife, who works in the linguistics department at Indiana University. He died at home on 27 November 2021.

== Research ==
- Generalized functions and Fourier analysis: An introduction (1972). New York: W. A. Benjamin.
- Self-adjointness of lattice Yang-Mills Hamiltonians and Kato's inequality with indefinite metric. Annales de l'institut Henri Poincaré (A) Physique théorique, 42 no. 1 (1985), p. 1-15
- with Steven P. Slinker. Euclidean field theory: I. The moment problem. Comm. Math. Phys. 43, no. 1 (1975), 41–58
- with R.J. Eden. Regge Surfaces and Singularities in a Relativistic Theory. Phys. Rev. 129, 2349–2353 (1963). Issue 5 – 1 March 1963
