= Erich Isaac =

Jewish activist (1928–2021)

- אריך יצחק
- Born: September 21, 1928
- Died: November 5, 2021 (aged 93)
- Occupations: Author, Jewish activist

Erich Isaac (Hebrew: אריך יצחק; September 21, 1928 – November 5, 2021) was a prominent l member, the first chairman of Americans for a Safe Israel (AFSI), professor and author.

== Biography ==
Born into an Orthodox Jewish home in Mainz, Germany, Isaac emigrated with his parents to Mandatory Palestine when he was nine years old. He joined Lehi around the time of his bar mitzvah, but was so young that he was only allowed to be a lookout during operations. His parents were opposed to him being a part of the resistance, fearing for his safety.

Isaac received his PhD, studying geography in species domestication. He studied at the University of Colorado at Boulder and then at Johns Hopkins University, where he also met his wife. He became a professor and taught at Temple University and then City College of New York.

== Publications ==
=== Books ===
- Isaac, Erich. (1967) The Enigma of Circumcision
- Isaac, Erich. (1970) Geography of Domestication ISBN 9780133514117
- Isaac, Rael Jean; Isaac, Erich. (1981) Sanctifying Revolution: Mainline Churchmen Turn Radical ISBN 0896330478
- Isaac, Rael Jean; Isaac, Erich. (1983) The Coercive Utopians: Social Deception by America's Power Players ISBN 9780895266187

=== Selected publications ===
- On the Domestication of Cattle, July 1962
- Myths, Cults and Livestock Breeding, March 1963
- A Basic Jewish Encyclopedia, by Harry A. Cohen; The Encyclopedia of the Jewish Religion, edited by R. J. Zwi Werblowsky and Geof, April 1967
- You Shall Be As Gods, by Erich Fromm, May 1967
- The Loneliest Jews of All, August 1968
- Prayer in Judaism, by Bernard Martin, August 1969
- Wanderings, by Chaim Potok, April 1979
- "With All Your Possessions": Jewish Ethics and Economic Life, by Meir Tamari, October 1987
