= Jung-dong, Seoul =

Jung-dong
- Country: South Korea

Korean name
- Hangul: 중동
- Hanja: 中洞
- RR: Jung-dong
- MR: Chung-dong

Jung-dong (Korean: 중동) is a dong (neighbourhood) of Mapo District, Seoul, South Korea.

== See also ==
- Administrative divisions of South Korea
