= Chanmyr Udumbara =

Russian statesman and politician (1948–2021)

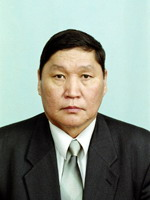

Member of the Federation Council of Russia
- In office 24 December 2001 – 8 October 2002
- Preceded by: Sholban Kara-ool
- Succeeded by: Lyudmila Narusova
- Constituency: Tuva

Personal details
- Born: 20 April 1948 Eerbek, Tuvan Autonomous Oblast, Russian SFSR, Soviet Union
- Died: 14 November 2021 (aged 73) Kyzyl, Russia

Chanmyr Udumbara (Russian: Чанмыр Александрович Удумбара; 20 April 1948 – 14 November 2021) was a Russian statesman and politician. He served on the Federation Council from 24 December 2001 to 8 October 2002.
