= Aliya Khambikova =

Russian volleyball player (1999–2021)

Aliya Khambikova (24 November 1999 – 7 November 2021) was a Russian professional volleyball player. She died at 21 due to illness.
