= Omar Sabry =

Egyptian water polo player (1927–2021)

Personal information
- Full name: Omar Baligh Sabry Abbas
- Nationality: Egyptian
- Born: 5 October 1927; Cairo, Egypt
- Died: 23 November 2021 (aged 94); Cairo, Egypt

Sport
- Sport: Water polo

Omar Sabry (5 October 1927 – 23 November 2021) was an Egyptian water polo player. He competed in the men's tournament at the 1952 Summer Olympics.
