= Costantino Fittante =

Italian politician and teacher (1933–2021)

Constantino Fittante
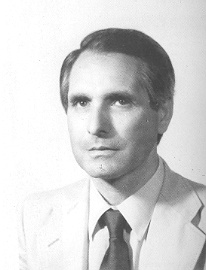

Member of the Chamber of Deputies of Italy
- In office 12 July 1983 – 1 July 1987
- Constituency: Catanzaro

Personal details
- Born: 1 December 1933 Chiaravalle Centrale, Italy
- Died: 19 November 2021 (aged 87) Lamezia Terme, Italy
- Party: PCI

Constantino Fittante (1 December 1933 – 19 November 2021) was an Italian politician. A member of the Italian Communist Party, he served in the Chamber of Deputies from 1983 to 1987.
