= Geoffrey Cormack =

Australian cricketer (1929–2021)

Personal information
- Full name: Geoffrey Fairhurst Cormack
- Born: 26 February 1929; Melbourne, Australia
- Died: 12 November 2021 (aged 92); Mornington Peninsula, Victoria, Australia
- Batting: Right-handed
- Bowling: Leg-break and googly
- Role: Bowler

Domestic team information
- Years: Team
- 1951/52–1953/54: Victoria

Career statistics
Competition	FC
Matches	5
Runs scored	72
Batting average	10.28
100s/50s	0/0
Top score	22
Balls bowled	1,102
Wickets	22
Bowling average	22.63
5 wickets in innings	1
10 wickets in match	0
Best bowling	6/32
Catches/stumpings	4/–
- Source: Cricinfo, 2 November 2025

Geoffrey Fairhurst Cormack (26 February 1929 – 12 November 2021) was an Australian cricketer.

A leg-spin bowler, Cormack played five first-class cricket matches for Victoria between 1952 and 1954. He took 6 for 32 against Tasmania in February 1952. He had a long career with Hawthorn-East Melbourne in Melbourne district cricket, taking 412 wickets in 211 matches between 1945 and 1967, and playing in two premiership teams.

Cormack died at his home on the Mornington Peninsula on 12 November 2021, at the age of 92.
