= Eugenio Pazzaglia =

Italian footballer (1948–2021)

Personal information
- Date of birth: 29 December 1948
- Place of birth: Tuoro sul Trasimeno, Italy
- Date of death: 4 November 2021 (aged 72)
- Position: Forward

Senior career*
Years	Team	Apps	(Gls)
1969–1970	Fano	25	(8)
1970–1972	Pisa	28	(3)
1972–1973	Civitavecchia	30	(13)
1973–1974	Cortona	32	(14)
1974–1980	Siena	165	(57)
Total		280	(95)
- * Club domestic league appearances and goals

Eugenio Pazzaglia (29 December 1948 – 4 November 2021) was an Italian professional footballer who played as a forward for Fano, Pisa, Civitavecchia, Cortona and Siena.
