= Des Greenslade =

- Full name: Desmond Greenslade
- Born: 11 January 1933 Cwmcarn, Wales
- Died: 16 November 2021 (aged 88)

Rugby union career
- Position: Prop
Senior career
Years	Team	Apps	(Points)
1955–63	Newport	285	
International career
Years	Team	Apps	(Points)
1962	Wales	1	(0)

Desmond Greenslade (11 January 1933 — 16 November 2021) was a Welsh international rugby union player.

A Cwmcarn-born miner, Greenslade was a prop and played most of his rugby at Newport, playing 285 matches after joining the club from Newbridge in 1955. He was in the Newport side that beat the touring 1957 Wallabies.

Greenslade made a one-off appearance for Wales in the 1962 Five Nations Championship, winning his cap as a replacement for injured prop Kingsley Jones against Scotland in Cardiff, a match they lost 3–8.

== See also ==
- List of Wales national rugby union players
