= Augusto Zweifel =

Italian footballer (1921–2021)

Personal information
- Date of birth: 12 July 1921
- Place of birth: Novara, Italy
- Date of death: 25 November 2021 (aged 100)
- Place of death: Novara, Italy
- Position: Midfielder

Senior career*
Years	Team	Apps	(Gls)
- Novara
- Chiasso
- * Club domestic league appearances and goals

Augusto Zweifel (12 July 1921 – 25 November 2021) was an Italian professional footballer who played for Novara, as well as Swiss club Chiasso. He also held a Swiss passport.
