= Mariano Castillo Alcalá =

Spanish politician (c.1948–2021)

Mariano Castillo Alcalá (c. 1948 – 9 November 2021) was a Spanish politician and member of the Spanish Socialist Workers' Party (PSOE). He served as mayor of Villacañas from 1983 to 1987, where he was also a key political figure in the municipality during the country's transition to democracy in the 1970s and 1980s. He was elected mayor as a PSOE candidate in the 1983, succeeding his predecessor, former mayor Demetrio Martínez. He was then elected to the regional Cortes of Castilla–La Mancha from 1987 to 1991.

Castillo later served as the president of Mancomunidad del Río Algodor, an organization which oversees the Algodor River in central Spain.

Castillo died on 9 November 2021, at the age of 73.
