= Abdoulkarim Goukoye =

Nigerien militant and politician (1964–2021)

Spokesperson of the Supreme Council for the Restoration of Democracy
- In office 18 February 2010 – 7 April 2011
- President: Salou Djibo

Personal details
- Born: 8 July 1964 Niamey, Niger
- Died: 8 November 2021 (aged 57) Brussels, Belgium
- Party: CSRD

Abdoulkarim Goukoye (8 July 1964 – 8 November 2021) was a Nigerien militant and politician. He took part in the 2010 Nigerien coup d'état, which deposed President Mamadou Tandja. Following the coup's success, he became spokesperson for the Supreme Council for the Restoration of Democracy under Salou Djibo.
