= Hermann Haverkamp =

German water polo player (1942–2021)

Personal information
- Nationality: German
- Born: 20 August 1942; Duisburg, Germany
- Died: 3 November 2021 (aged 79); Krefeld, Germany

Sport
- Sport: Water polo

Hermann Haverkamp (20 August 1942 – 3 November 2021) was a German water polo player. He competed at the 1968 Summer Olympics and the 1972 Summer Olympics.

Haverkamp died on 3 November 2021, at the age of 79.
