= Nikolai Golyushev =

Russian opera singer (1929–2021)

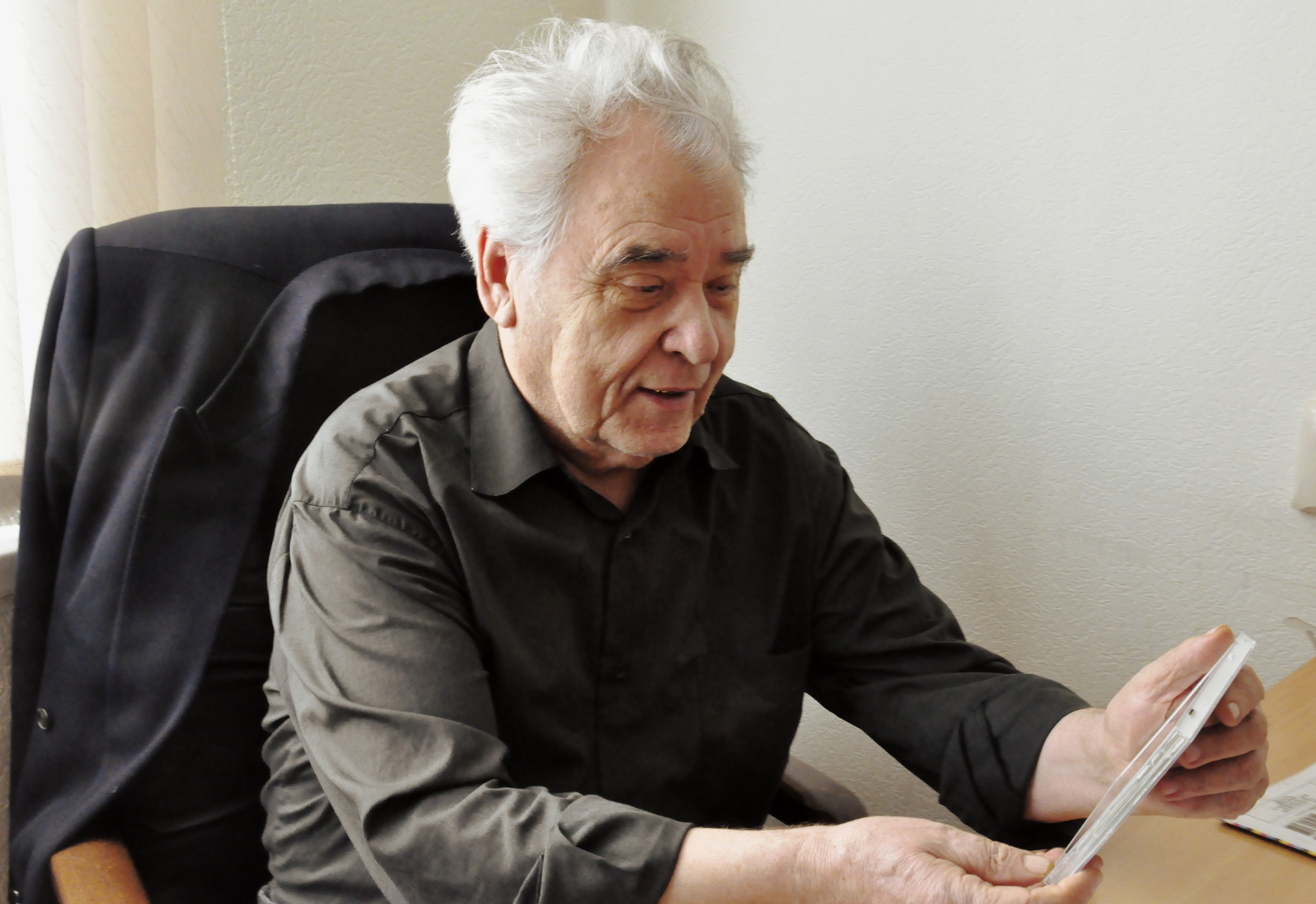
- Golyushev in 2014
- Born: 9 December 1929; Kasli, Ural Oblast, Russian SFSR, Soviet Union
- Died: 23 November 2021 (aged 91); Yekaterinburg, Russia
- Occupation: Opera singer

Nikolai Golyushev (9 December 1929 – 23 November 2021) was a Russian opera singer. He was a recipient of the People's Artist of the RSFSR (1980).

Golyushev died on 23 November 2021, at the age of 91.
