= John B. Winter =

American politician

Member of the Minnesota House of Representatives from the 50A district
- In office 1967–1970

Personal details
- Born: January 22, 1930 Saint Paul, Minnesota, U.S.
- Died: November 14, 2021 (aged 91)
- Children: 3
- Education: Macalester College

John B. Winter (January 22, 1930 – November 14, 2021) was an American politician. He served as a member for the 50A district of the Minnesota House of Representatives.

== Life and career ==
Winter was born in Saint Paul, Minnesota. He attended Humboldt High School and Macalester College.

Winter served in the Minnesota House of Representatives from 1967 to 1970. He was a member of the Conservative caucus.

Winter died on November 14, 2021, at the age of 91.
