= Pa Nderry Mbai =

Gambian American journalist (died 2021)

Pa Nderry M'Bai (died 22 November 2021) was a Gambian American journalist based in Raleigh, North Carolina. Mr. M'Bai was most notable for being the Founding Managing Editor, and Publisher of the US based online news website, Freedom Newspaper. Mr. Mbai, played a key role in exposing human rights abuses and other injustices during former Gambia President Yahya Jammeh's time in office. In his younger years, he worked hard as a security guard stationed at the US Peace Corps "sick house" where members of the Peace Corps would go to get some rest or recover from illness. He was very literate even back in those years and often exchanged ideas and thoughts with some of the young Americans he met. He also spent a lot of time with some British ship crew who had an office and rest station opposite the Peace Corps location.

“He showed visitors aspects of Gambian society and discussed political corruption in the country.”
