= Zenon Trzonkowski =

Polish footballer and manager (1957–2021)

Personal information
- Date of birth: 19 September 1957
- Place of birth: Brzeg, Poland
- Date of death: 18 November 2021 (aged 64)
- Place of death: Opole, Poland
- Height: 1.90 m (6 ft 3 in)
- Position: Defender

Youth career
- Stal Brzeg

Senior career*
Years	Team	Apps	(Gls)
1976–1977	Stal Brzeg		
1977–1982	Śląsk Wrocław	34	(0)
1982–1983	Zagłębie Lubin		

Managerial career
- 1983–1984: Śląsk Wrocław (youth)
- 1984–1985: Śląsk Wrocław II
- 1985: Odra Opole
- Karpaty Krosno
- BTP Brzeg
- * Club domestic league appearances and goals

Zenon Trzonkowski (19 September 1957 – 18 November 2021) was a Polish professional footballer who played as a defender and later coach and manager.

== Playing career ==
Starting his career at Stal Brzeg, Trzonkowski went on to play 34 matches in the top division for Śląsk Wrocław. He also played for their reserves when they won promotion to the third division in 1982, before ending his career at rivals Zagłębie Lubin.

He ended his playing career aged 26 due to a career-ending knee injury.

== Coaching and managerial career ==
Trzonkowski managed Śląsk's youth and reserve teams, and won promotion to the third division with the latter. In 1985, he was briefly manager of Odra Opole. He later also managed Karpaty Krosno and ended his career at home club, called BTP at the time.
