= Abhay Vakil =

Indian businessman (1951–2021)

- Born: October 29, 1950; Mumbai, India
- Died: November 2, 2021 (aged 71); Mumbai, India
- Education: University of Mumbai; Syracuse University
- Occupations: Non-executive director, Asian Paints Ltd
- Children: 3

Abhay Arvind Vakil (1951–2021) was an Indian billionaire businessman, and a non-executive director of Asian Paints Ltd, India's largest paint company. As of October 2021, his net worth was estimated at US$6.25 billion. Vakil was among the 100 richest Indians.

As per Forbes list of India’s 100 richest tycoons, dated October 9, 2024, Vakil family is ranked 61st with a net worth of $5.35 Billion.

== Early life ==
Vakil was born in 1951 in Mumbai. His father Arvind Vakil was one of the co-founders of Asian Paints Ltd. Vakil completed his bachelor of science at the University of Mumbai, and another BS from Syracuse University in the United States. Vakil joined his family business Asian Paints in 1974.

== Associations ==
Vakil served as managing director of Asian Paints and Hitech Plast. He was also chairman of Resins and Plastics, Non Executive Director of Asian Paints, Non-Executive Director of Resins and Plastics Additional & Non-Executive Director at Asian Paints, Director of Asteroids Trading and Investments, Nehal Trading and Investments, Jalaj Trading and Investments, and Unnati Trading and Investments.

== Personal life ==
Vakil was married, with three children, and lived in Mumbai. His son Vivek Vakil works for the business. He died on 2 November 2021.
