= Kwon Jung-dong =

South Korean politician (1932–2021)

Minister of Labor
- In office 1980 – 21 May 1982
- Preceded by: Park Chang-gyu
- Succeeded by: Jeong-Joo Jeong

Member of the National Assembly of South Korea
- In office 11 April 1985 – 29 May 1988
- Preceded by: Chong-dal Kwon

Personal details
- Born: 10 September 1932
- Died: 26 November 2021 (aged 89)
- Party: DJP

Korean name
- Hangul: 권중동
- RR: Gwon Jungdong
- MR: Kwŏn Chungdong

Kwon Jung-dong (Korean: 권중동; 10 September 1932 – 26 November 2021) was a South Korean politician. A member of the Democratic Justice Party, he served as Minister of Labor from 1980 to 1982 and in the National Assembly from 1985 to 1988.

== Early life ==
Jung-dong was born on September 10, 1932 in Sinseol-dong, Seoul, South Korea, the fourth child of seven. Jung-dong would receive his high school diploma from Andong High School, before attending a teacher training course at the College of Fine Arts at Seoul National, graduating in 1955.

== Political career ==
In 1961, Jung-dong would become the Secretary General of the National Postal Workers Union, succeeding the position in 1964 to become president. Addidionally, in 1970 he would serve as director of the Central Education Center of the Korean Federation of Trade Unions.

Jung-dong would formally enter into politics in 1976, as a member of Yushin Jeongwoohoe National Assembly in the 9th National Assembly. His initial foray would be marked with a strong consciousness of the position of South Koreon workers. In 1979, Jung-dong would collaborate with some other persons involved within the labour movement, notably Choi Soon, who was later arrested protesting, in an attempt to solve the YH incident. Jung-dong was promoted to Commissioner of Labour in 1980, but received the position of Minister of Labour when the Office of Labour became the Ministry of Labour in 1981, serving until 1982.

In 1987, after being elected to the National Assembly in 1985 as a candidate for the Democratic Justice Party, Jung-dong authored and proposed the Korea Occupational Safety and Health Agency bill which aimed to "maintain and promote the safety and health of employees by preventing industrial accidents by establishing standards on industrial safety and health and clarifying where the responsibility lies, and by creating a comfortable working environment." The bill was well received and significantly raised Jung-dong's profile within the Labour movement.

Jung-dong would run in the 13th National Assembly in 1988, again as a candidate for the Democratic Justice Party, but would fail to be elected. He would again fail to be elected in 1992, this time running as an independent.

== Personal life ==
Jung-dong has five daughters.
