= 2021 in Australia =

- Monarch: Elizabeth II
- Governor-General: David Hurley
- Prime minister: Scott Morrison
- Australian of the Year: Grace Tame
- Elections: WA, TAS

The following lists events that happened during 2021 in Australia.

- Decades: 2000s; 2010s; 2020s; 2030s
- See also: 2021 in Australian television; 2021 in Australian literature; Other events of 2021; Timeline of Australian history

== Incumbents ==
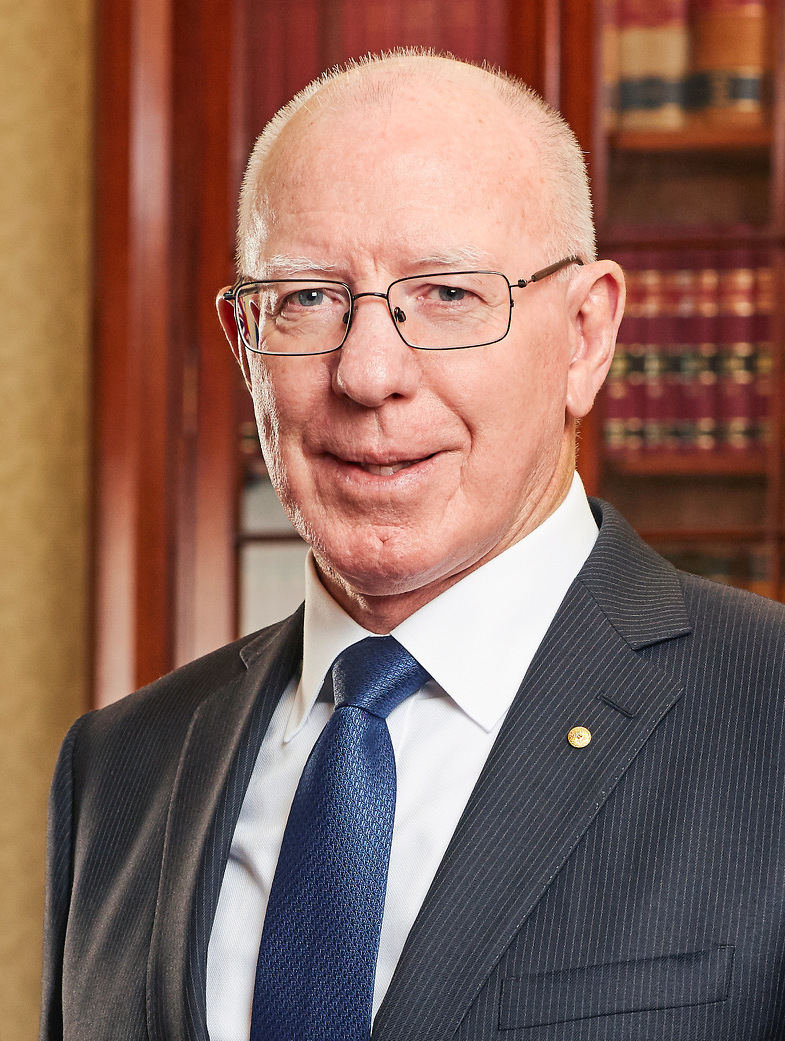
David Hurley

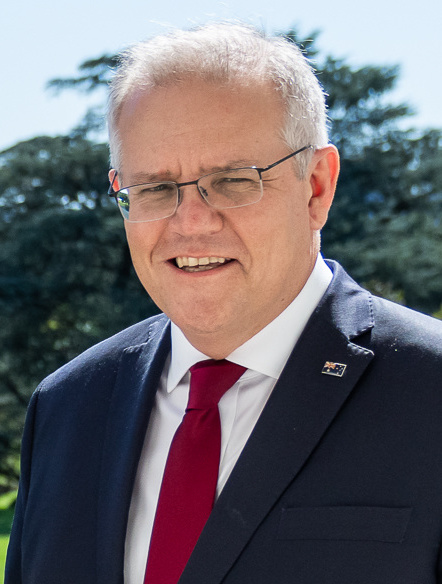
Scott Morrison

- Monarch – Elizabeth II
- Governor-General – David Hurley
- Prime Minister – Scott Morrison
  - Deputy Prime Minister – Michael McCormack (until 22 June), then Barnaby Joyce
  - Opposition Leader – Anthony Albanese
- Chief Justice – Susan Kiefel

=== State and territory leaders ===
- Premier of New South Wales – Gladys Berejiklian (until 5 October), then Dominic Perrottet
  - Opposition Leader – Jodi McKay (until 28 May), then Chris Minns (from 4 June)
- Premier of Queensland – Annastacia Palaszczuk
  - Opposition Leader – David Crisafulli
- Premier of South Australia – Steven Marshall
  - Opposition Leader – Peter Malinauskas
- Premier of Tasmania – Peter Gutwein
  - Opposition Leader – Rebecca White (until 15 May), then David O'Byrne (from 15 June until 7 July), then Rebecca White
- Premier of Victoria – Daniel Andrews
  - Opposition Leader – Michael O'Brien (until 7 September), then Matthew Guy
- Premier of Western Australia – Mark McGowan
  - Opposition Leader – Zak Kirkup (until 14 April), then Mia Davies
- Chief Minister of the Australian Capital Territory – Andrew Barr
  - Opposition Leader – Elizabeth Lee
- Chief Minister of the Northern Territory – Michael Gunner
  - Opposition Leader – Lia Finocchiaro

=== Governors and administrators ===
- Governor of New South Wales – Margaret Beazley
- Governor of Queensland – Paul de Jersey (until 1 November), then Jeannette Young
- Governor of South Australia – Hieu Van Le (until 31 August), then Frances Adamson (from 7 October)
- Governor of Tasmania – Kate Warner (until 9 June), then Barbara Baker (from 16 June)
- Governor of Victoria – Linda Dessau
- Governor of Western Australia – Kim Beazley
- Administrator of the Australian Indian Ocean Territories – Natasha Griggs
- Administrator of Norfolk Island – Eric Hutchinson
- Administrator of the Northern Territory – Vicki O'Halloran

== Events ==
=== January ===
- 1 January – The words of the Australian national anthem, "Advance Australia Fair", are changed for the first time since 1984, amending the line "For we are young and free" to "For we are one and free".
- 2 January – Two women drown during a guided canyoning tour at Mount Wilson in the Blue Mountains
- 8 January – A three-day lockdown is imposed on the Greater Brisbane area to stop the spread of a UK COVID-19 variant after a hotel quarantine worker unknowingly contracted the virus and spread it out into the community.
- 22 January − An ongoing plague of mice continued to cause problems and began to cause concerns for crops in areas of New South Wales and Queensland.

- By March the mice were stripping food and other items from the shelves of a supermarket in Gulargambone.
- In June 2021 the plague caused the complete evacuation of the Wellington Correctional Centre as dead mice and damage to infrastructure led to concern for the health and safety of inmates and staff.

- 25 January – Israel extradites Malka Leifer to Australia, after a six-year battle to extradite her in the light of the Adass Israel School sex abuse scandal.
- 26 January – On Australia Day the National Socialist Network, a new Far Right group created by members of the Antipodean Resistance and the Lads Society under Lads leader Thomas Sewell, were observed parading Nazi paraphernalia at several locations around the Grampians in Victoria. One Halls Gap resident said: "There were 40 white males, many with skinheads, some chanting 'white power'". They were reported to have chanted "sieg heil" and "white power", burnt a cross, and posted stickers saying "Australia For The White Man".
- 31 January – A snap five-day lockdown is imposed on the city of Perth and the Peel region, after a hotel quarantine worker tests positive for the virulent Variant of Concern 202012/01 of the SARS-CoV-2 virus.

=== February ===
- 11 February – A tsunami warning is issued and later retracted after a 7.7 magnitude earthquake just off the coast of New Caledonia brought fears of a possible tsunami impacting Lord Howe Island.
- 15 February – 2021 Australian Parliament House sexual misconduct allegations
- 15 February – 142,000 doses of the Pfizer–BioNTech COVID-19 vaccine arrived in Australia.
- 18 February – Facebook blocks all Australian news websites from sharing news content on its social media platform, preventing any Facebook user from sharing news content from any Australian-based news websites, and preventing Australian users from accessing news content from overseas media outlets on Facebook.
- 20 February – The Indigenous and Māori All Stars draw 10–10 in the 2021 All Stars match, held at Queensland Country Bank Stadium. Māori prop James Fisher-Harris, of Penrith Panthers, wins the Preston Campbell medal for Man of the Match.
  - The Māori Women's All Stars defeat the Indigenous Women's All Stars 24–0 in the 2021 Women's All Stars match. Raecene McGregor is named Player of the Match.
- 22 February – The first doses of the Pfizer–BioNTech COVID-19 vaccine are administered.

=== March ===
- 1 March – The Final Report of the Royal Commission into Aged Care Quality and Safety is tabled.
- 11 March – The 2021 NRL season commences, with 2020 premiers Melbourne Storm defeating South Sydney Rabbitohs 26–18 at AAMI Park.
- 13 March – The 2021 Western Australian state election is held with the incumbent McGowan Labor government winning with an increased majority.
- 15 March – Tens of thousands of people attend March 4 Justice rallies across Australia calling for an end to gender-based violence and workplace harassment.
- 18 March – The 2021 AFL season commences, with 2019/20 two-time premiers Richmond Tigers defeating Carlton Blues at the MCG.
- 19 March – A significant weather event impacts the New South Wales Mid North Coast and Western Sydney, causing major flooding and evacuations. Low-lying parts of Port Macquarie, Bulahdelah, City of Penrith, City of Hawkesbury, Dunbogan and the Laurieton foreshore are evacuated as a precaution.
- 20 March – Due to intense rainfall in the previous days, Cundletown and the Taree CBD are evacuated as the Manning River swells to a peak of 5.65 metres.
- Intense rainfall also impacts Greater Sydney, New South Wales and Warragamba Dam in Western Sydney overflows for the first time since 2012. Evacuation orders are put in place for suburbs and localities located close to the Nepean and Hawksbury rivers.
- 28 March – The JobKeeper wage subsidy ends, with the government implementing targeted relief packages for industries affected by the COVID-19 pandemic such as tourism.
- 29 March – Prime Minister Morrison reshuffled his cabinet:
  - The new 'Minister for Women's Safety' portfolio was created in cabinet. The Minister for Families and Social Services, Anne Ruston, will add that role to her current duties.
  - Michaelia Cash replaces Christian Porter as the Attorney-General and Industrial Relations Minister.
  - Karen Andrews replaces Peter Dutton as Home Affairs Minister as he moves to the Defence Ministry.
  - Linda Reynolds replaces Stuart Robert as Government Services and National Disability Insurance Scheme minister. Robert's takes on Cash's former employment roles.
  - Jane Hume, moves from Minister for Superannuation, Financial Services and the Digital Economy to the new post of Minister for Women's Economic security
  - Amanda Stoker, Assistant Minister to the Attorney-General, will also be the Assistant Minister for Women, and Assistant Minister for Industrial Relations.
- 29 March – A three-day lockdown is imposed on the Brisbane, Logan, Moreton Bay, Ipswich and Redlands to stop the spread of a UK COVID-19 variant.
- 31 March – New Queen's Colour is presented to the Royal Australian Air Force to mark its Centenary during the parade and an inspection by the Governor-General David Hurley in Canberra.

=== April ===
- 15 April – The first Australian died from thrombosis with thrombocytopenia syndrome (TTS), after vaccination with the Oxford–AstraZeneca COVID-19 vaccine.
- 21 April – The Australian Government announces it will be pulling Victoria out of the Chinese "Belt and Road Initiative" completely.

=== May ===
- 1 May – The 2021 Tasmanian state election is held. Peter Gutwein's Liberal government is returned for a third term.
- 4 May – Seven waterspouts form just off the coast of Old Bar unexpectedly. At one point, 5 of them are on the ground at the same time.
- 25 May – An explosion at the Callide Power Station near Biloela in Central Queensland triggers widespread power outages across the state.
- 27 May – 52 finalists for the Archibald Prize and the Packing Room Prize winner, Kathrin Longhurst for her portrait of Kate Ceberano, are announced.

=== June ===
- 4 June – Peter Wegner wins the 2021 Archibald Prize for Portrait of Guy Warren at 100
- 9 June – The first State of Origin series rugby league match to ever be held outside a capital city is played at North Queensland Stadium in Townsville, Queensland following a COVID-19 outbreak in Melbourne where the game was scheduled to be played. New South Wales defeat Queensland 50–6, while NSW centre Tom Trbojevic is awarded man of the match. The pre-game entertainment is headlined by The Veronicas.
- 11 June – Floods in Eastern Victoria claim the lives of two residents as the Traralgon Creek bursts its banks, inundating properties.
- 12 June – Extremely low rates of influenza and no reported deaths from it. 2019 had 800 flu deaths, 2020 was below 40.
- 21 June – Barnaby Joyce defeats Michael McCormack in a leadership spill of the Nationals and regains the position of deputy Prime Minister.
- 25 June – Queensland defeat New South Wales 8–6 in the 2021 Women's State of Origin match at Sunshine Coast Stadium. Queensland second-rower Tazmin Gray is awarded the Nellie Doherty medal for player of the match.
- 26 June – Greater Sydney, Wollongong, Blue Mountains and the Central Coast are placed into lockdown as the Delta variant of COVID-19 spreads.
- 27 June – New South Wales defeat Queensland 26–0 at Suncorp Stadium in the second match of the 2021 State of Origin series, effectively sealing a series win, while Queensland suffered their first loss in Brisbane since 2017. NSW fullback and captain James Tedesco is awarded man of the match. The pre-game entertainment is headlined by Sheppard.
- 27 June – Melbourne City FC defeat Sydney FC 3–1 in the 2021 A-League Grand Final at AAMI Park in Melbourne, in Melbourne City's first Grand Final win.

=== July ===
- 6 July – St. George Illawarra Dragons prop Paul Vaughan's club contract is terminated following his hosting of a Shellharbour team house party in breach of both the NRL's biosecurity protocols and Sydney's lockdown orders. On the preceding day, twelve other Dragons players present at the event were charged with fines of varying severity and handed one-week suspensions. Vaughan was initially banned for eight weeks and had previously breached protocol in August 2020.
- 8 July – Royal Commission into Defence and Veteran Suicide established.
- 10 July – World No. 1 women's tennis player Ash Barty wins her first Wimbledon ladies' singles title, 41 years after Evonne Goolagong Cawley's win.
- 11 July – Australia records its first death from the COVID-19 pandemic for 2021, as Sydney records 77 cases of community transmission.
- 14 July – Following a relocation from Sydney, then Newcastle, Queensland defeat New South Wales 20–18 at Cbus Super Stadium in the third match of the 2021 State of Origin series, though NSW still win the series overall from their two prior victories. Queensland hooker Ben Hunt is awarded man of the match, while NSW centre Tom Trbojevic is awarded player of the series. Pre-game entertainment is headlined by Lime Cordiale and JK-47.
- 15 July – Amanda Lohrey wins the 2021 Miles Franklin Award for The Labyrinth.
- 16 July – Melbourne enters snap lockdown with 18 cases of COVID-19.
- 20 July – Australia's then oldest verified man to have ever lived, Dexter Kruger, dies at the age of 111 years and 188 days.
- 21 July – Brisbane is announced as the host city for the 2032 Summer Olympics and the 2032 Summer Paralympics.

=== August ===
- 1 August – YouTube bars Sky News Australia from uploading new content onto their channel for a week for breaking YouTube's rules on spreading COVID-19 misinformation.
- 7 August – The Armidale Regional Council local government area in northern New South Wales has a snap week-long lockdown imposed, after two positive cases of COVID-19 are detected in the region.
- 10 August – The national Census of Population and Housing is held.
- 21 August – New South Wales records the highest daily COVID-19 case numbers in Australia thus far, recording 825 new cases of COVID-19.
- 25 August – New South Wales records 1,029 new cases of COVID-19 in 24 hours becoming the first state in Australia to surpass the 1,000 daily case milestone.

=== September ===
- 5 September – Melbourne Storm win the minor premiership (their fifth since 2011) following the final main round of the 2021 NRL season. Canterbury-Bankstown Bulldogs finish in last position, claiming their first wooden spoon since 2008.
- 15 September – Australia cancels its Attack-class submarine submarine construction deal with France, representing $90b, in favour of the AUKUS security alliance with the United States and United Kingdom, which includes the acquisition of nuclear powered submarines.
- 20 September – in Melbourne, there was a protest by hundreds of people against mandatory vaccination for construction workers outside the Construction, Forestry, Maritime, Mining and Energy Union (CFMEU) headquarters. The protest became violent, the union building was damaged, and riot police employed pepper spray and rubber bullets. Combined with an increase in transmission of COVID-19 in the industry, from 11.59pm that night all building and construction industry worksites in Ballarat, Geelong, Metropolitan Melbourne, Mitchell Shire and the Surf Coast were shut down for two weeks.
- 21 September – in Melbourne, there was another protest with thousands of people marching against a wide range of pandemic response related issues, including the previous days' construction industry shut down. The "Victorian Workers Rally For Freedom" started near to the CFMEU headquarters at 10am, went through the CBD, past state Parliament, Flinders Street railway station, then onto and blocking the busy West Gate Freeway causing "chaos" in peak hour traffic. At least one media reporter was assaulted, and objects, including bottles and flares, were thrown at police. Riot police again used tear gas and rubber bullets and at least 62 arrests were made. Union officials such as John Setka, CFMEU Victorian state secretary, and Sally McManus, Australian Council of Trade Unions (ACTU) national secretary, asserted that the protests had been hijacked, McManus saying it was by "... far right groups and anti-vax groups, ...". The construction shutdown has put about 300,000 out of work, and could cost the industry nearly AU$500 million per day.
- 22 September – A 5.9 magnitude earthquake is reported, with the epicentre being around the Mansfield area in north-eastern Victoria. The quake's effects were felt as far away as Tasmania and Adelaide. Southern New South Wales experienced the quake as well.
  - in Melbourne city there was yet another protest, with up to 1,000 people converging on the Shrine of Remembrance. After a stand-off for a few hours with police surrounding them, protesters were dispersed at about 5pm. Two police officers were injured by thrown bottles and more than 200 people were arrested. An estimated 300 fines were issued for not complying with stay-at-home directives. One protester there was hospitalised by the next day with COVID-19.
- 25 September – Melbourne Demons defeat Western Bulldogs 21.14 (140) to 10.6 (66) to win the 2021 AFL Grand Final at Optus Stadium, Perth. It is the Demons' first premiership victory since 1964.
- 30 September – A tornado touches down in the NSW Central West, demolishing homes in Peel and Meadow Flat. Three people are left injured.

=== October ===
- 1 October – Gladys Berejiklian announces she will resign as Premier of New South Wales after the Independent Commission Against Corruption commences an investigation into her conduct.
- 3 October – Penrith Panthers defeat South Sydney Rabbitohs 14–12 to win the 2021 NRL Grand Final at Suncorp Stadium, securing their first premiership since 2003 and their third overall. Panthers halfback Nathan Cleary is awarded the Clive Churchill medal for man of the match. Pre-match entertainment is headlined by Kate Miller-Heidke and Ian Moss, with Miller-Heidke also performing the national anthem.
- 5 October – Gladys Berejiklian resigns as Premier of New South Wales, and is replaced by Dominic Perrottet as premier and leader of the Liberal Party.
- 14 October – A tornado touches down in the night, moving through the city of Armidale ripping roofs from houses and flipping vehicles.
- 18 October - Emma Watkins announces that she is leaving The Wiggles at the end of the year to focus on pursuing her PhD. She handed over her yellow skivvy to Tsehay Hawkins.
- 22 October – Queensland Police Service employees lose legal bid against mandatory COVID-19 vaccination.
- 31 October – Pressed to answer a question on the broken submarine deal, French President Emmanuel Macron says he knows Scott Morrison has lied to him.

=== November ===
- 2 November – Verry Elleegant wins the 2021 Melbourne Cup.
- 3 November – Four-year-old Cleo Smith, who disappeared from the Blowholes campsite on 16 October, is found alive by police at a house in Carnarvon, Western Australia.
- 5 November – The stated objective of 80% of Australians aged 16+ receiving two doses of a COVID-19 vaccine is reached
- 16 November – anti-lockdown and anti-vaccination protests occurred outside of the Victorian parliament, They had a makeshift Gallows of an effigy of Dan Andrews. This was condemned by many political leaders.
- 30 November – The Jenkins Report into the Australian Federal Parliament House sexual misconduct allegations is released.

=== December ===
- 2 December – In New South Wales, the first case of Omicron variant, a highly mutated variant of COVID-19, is reported by the Department of Health and Aged Care in a Sydney resident, who had traveled to South Africa.
- 3 December – A few months before the elections, Labor announces 43% cut to emissions by 2030 as climate policy goal
- 6 December –
  - Australian Department of Health and Aged Care reports that Deltacron hybrid variant is now pre-dominant strain in Australia, which is combined with Delta and Omicron variants, accounting for three-quarters of cases.
  - New COVID-19 lockdowns in Australia has unlikely to returned amid Deltacron hybrid infection surge.
- 7 December – Canterbury-Bankstown Bulldogs announced that John Asiata's contract has been terminated effective immediately. It resulted from Asiata's refusals to get vaccinated against COVID-19. Asiata becomes the first NRL player to suffer this fate.
- 16 December – A jumping castle and two zorbs were lifted into the air by a gust of a wind at Hillcrest primary school, located in the south-west Devonport, killing six children.
- 19 December – A microburst forms in Sydney's Northern Beaches, killing one person and leaving two people critically injured. Power went down for more than 12,000 residents and has not been restored as of 20 December.
- 28 December – The Australian cricket team retains the Ashes in the 2021–22 series at the MCG.
- 30 December – A fire broke out at the entrance of Old Parliament House, Canberra. Police confirmed the fire had been started by protestors. A spokesperson from Old Parliament House said the heritage doors, the portico and the building's facade all sustained substantial damage from the fire. It was the second incident involving protestors and a fire at Old Parliament House after a fire, lit by protestors, scorched the front doors on 21 December 2021.

== Deaths ==
=== January ===
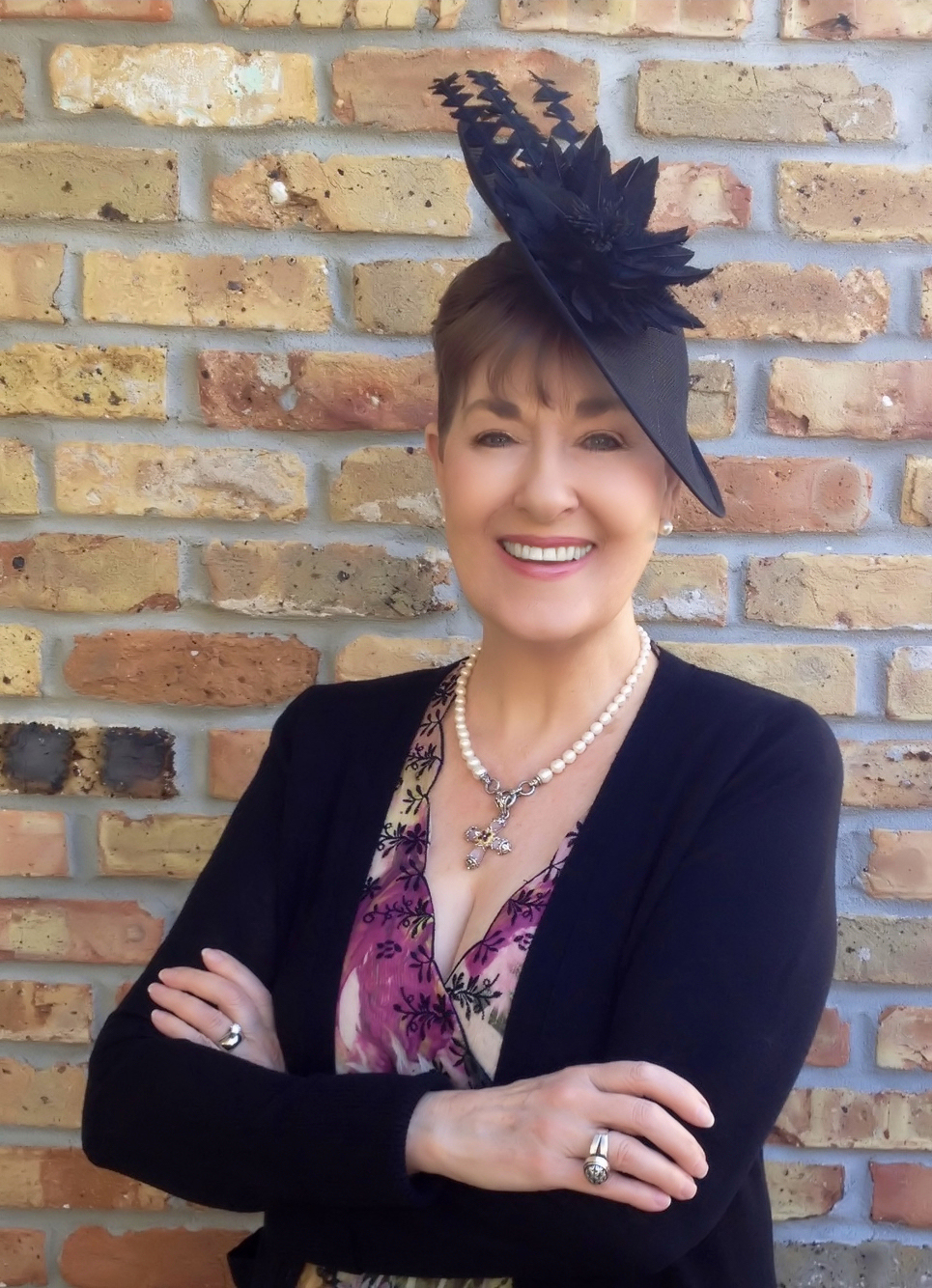
Kerry Vincent

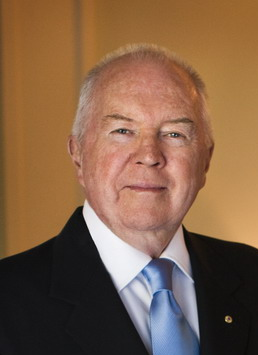
Michael Bryce

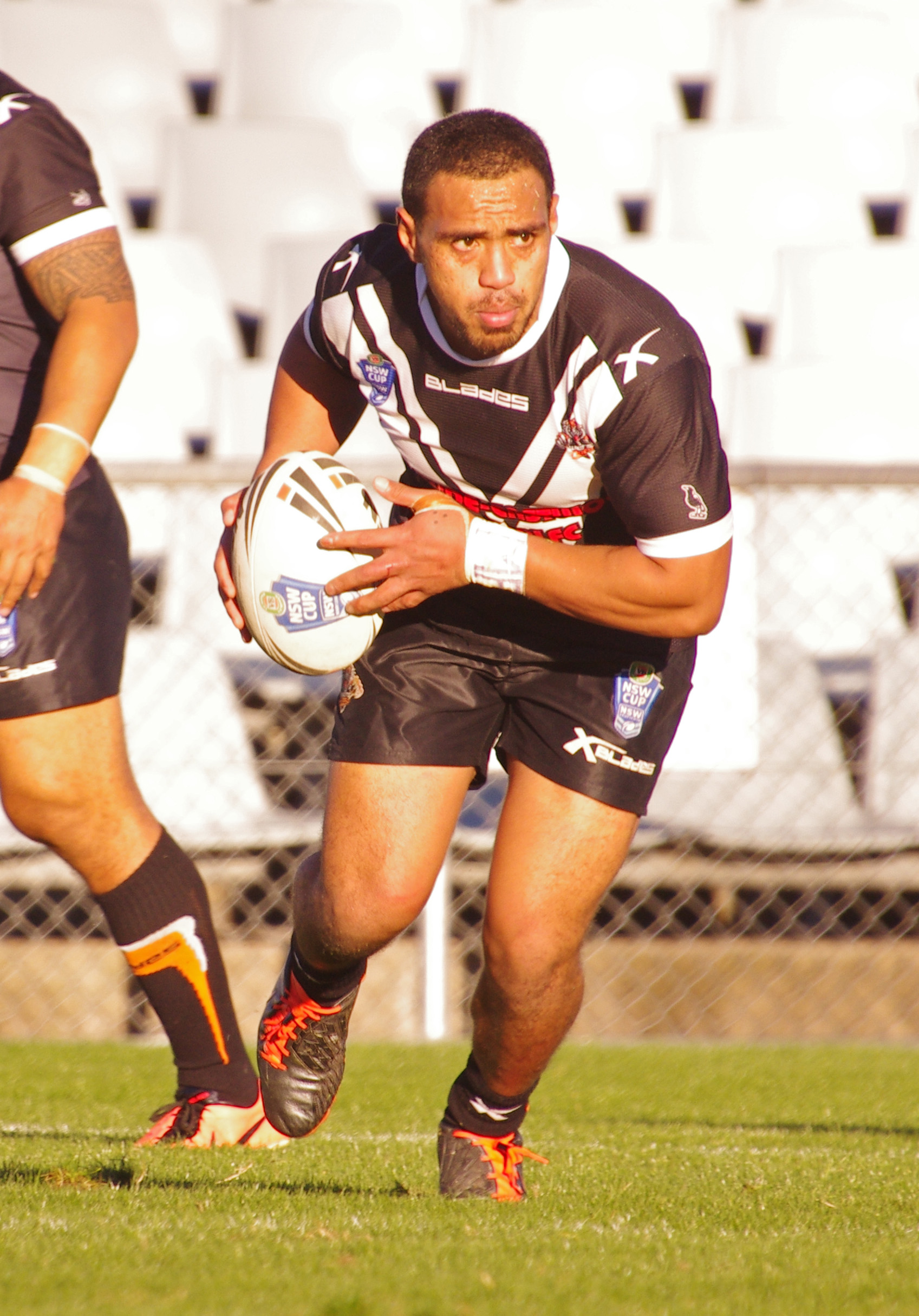
Masada Iosefa

- 2 January – Kerry Vincent, chef and television personality (b. 1945)
- 3 January
  - Alf Callick, Australian rules footballer (South Melbourne) (b. 1925)
  - Alan Daly, Australian rules footballer (Melbourne) (b. 1929)
  - Warren McLean, drummer (Divinyls) (b. unknown)
- 5 January – Bob Brett, tennis coach (b. 1953)
- 6 January – Jack Lihou, cricketer (b. 1930)
- 7 January – Ian Foreman, Australian rules footballer (Footscray) (b. 1930)
- 8 January – Colin McDonald, cricketer (b. 1928)
- 10 January – Graham Arthur, Australian rules footballer (Hawthorn) (b. 1936)
- 12 January – Frank Arok, soccer player and coach (born in Yugoslavia, died in Serbia) (b. 1932)
- 14 January
  - Cliff Burvill, Olympic cyclist (b. 1937)
  - Elijah Moshinsky, opera director (born in China, died in England) (b. 1946)
- 15 January – Michael Bryce, 26th Spouse of the Governor-General of Australia, architect and designer (b. 1938)
- 16 January – Chris Murphy, band manager and music entrepreneur (b. 1954)
- 17 January
  - David Lea, Victorian politician (born in the United Kingdom) (b. 1935)
  - Jon Sullivan, Queenslander politician (b. 1950)
  - Philip Wilson, archbishop (b. 1950)
- 21 January – Dave Bolton, rugby league player and coach (born in the United Kingdom) (b. 1937)
- 22 January – Ron Campbell, animator (died in the United States) (b. 1939)
- 23 January
  - Trisha Noble, singer and actress (b. 1944)
  - George Weatherill, South Australian politician (b. 1936)
- 25 January – Masada Iosefa, rugby league player (born in Samoa) (b. 1988)
- 26 January
  - Virginia Fraser, artist (b. 1947)
  - Luc Julian Matthys, bishop (born in Belgium) (b. 1935)
- 28 January – Valerie Yule, child psychologist (b. 1929)

=== February ===
- 4 February – A. David Buckingham, chemist (died in the United Kingdom) (b. 1930)
- 5 February – Sam Gannon, cricketer (b. 1947)
- 6 February – Ken McCaffery, rugby league player (b. 1929)
- 7 February – Lilliane Brady, Mayor of Cobar (b. 1930)
- 10 February – Audrey Meaney, archaeologist and historian (born in the United Kingdom) (b. 1931)
- 13 February – Raymond Specht, plant ecologist (b. 1924)
- 16 February – Jason Benjamin, artist (b. 1971)
- 17 February
  - Frances Harris, historian (born in the United Kingdom) (b. 1950)
  - Murray Weideman, Australian rules footballer and coach (b. 1936)
- 18 February – John Spencer, rugby league player (b. 1946)
- 21 February
  - Kevin Dann, rugby league player (b. 1958)
  - Shane Lewis, Olympic swimmer (b. 1973)
- 23 February – Sean Kennedy, bassist (Deez Nuts) (b. 1985)
- 25 February
  - Bede Vincent Heather, Roman Catholic bishop (b. 1928)
  - Jim Johnson, jockey (b. 1929)
- 28 February – Syd Slocomb, Australian rules footballer (St Kilda) (b. 1930)

=== March ===
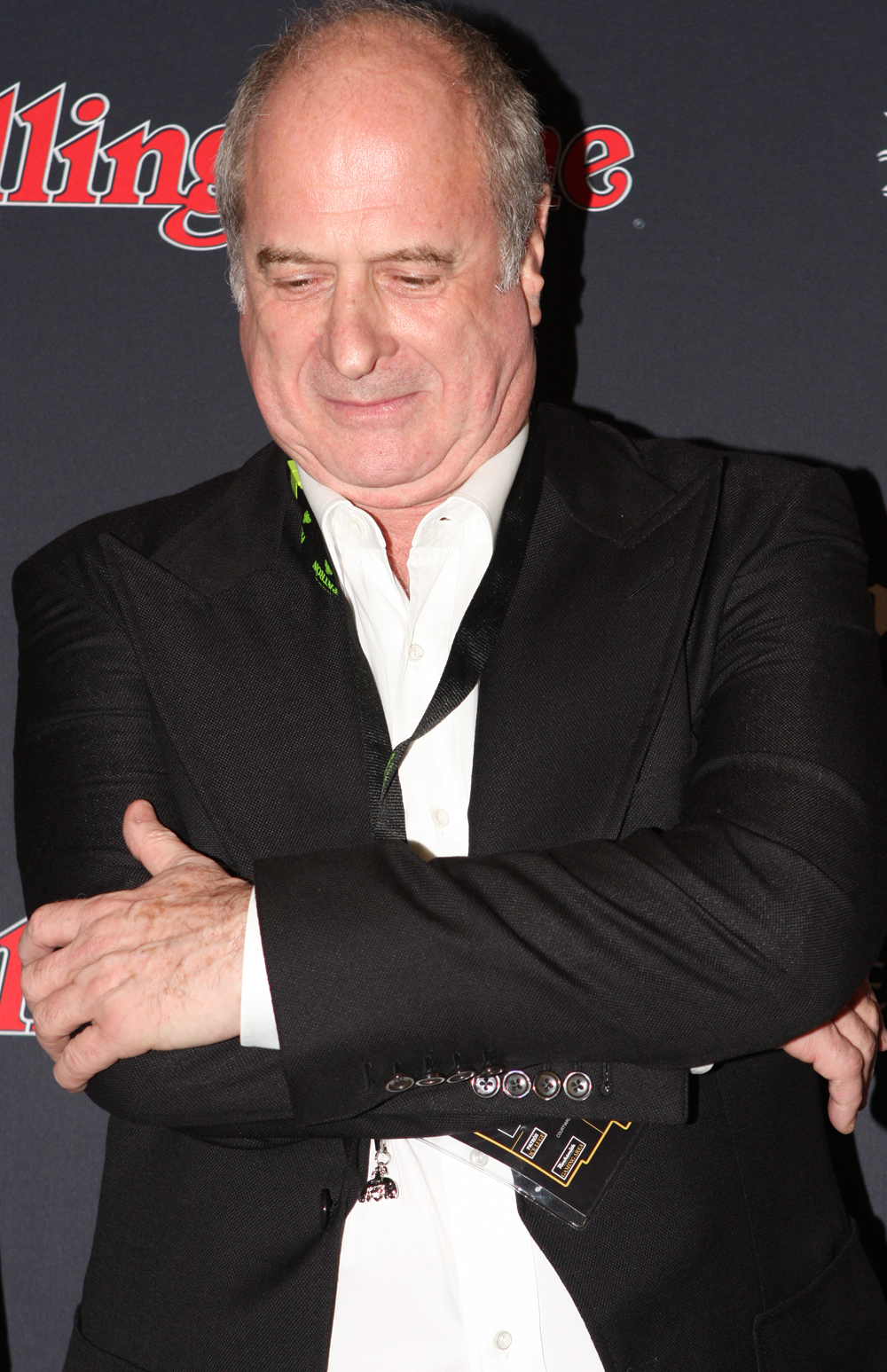
Michael Gudinski

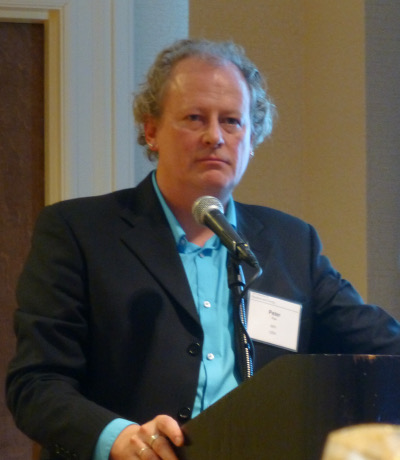
Peter Fox

- 1 March – Michael Gudinski, music entrepreneur (b. 1952)
- 3 March – Katharina Gaus, immunologist (born in West Germany) (b. 1972)
- 8 March – Alan Marnoch, soccer player (born in the United Kingdom) (b. 1945)
- 11 March – Donald McDonnell, Olympic boxer (b. 1933)
- 12 March – Austen Angell, physical chemist (died in the United States) (b. 1933)
- 15 March
  - Allan Montgomery, Australian rules footballer (Carlton) (b. 1958)
  - Doug Parkinson, singer (b. 1946)
  - Chester Porter, barrister (b. 1926)
- 16 March – Kevin Bradshaw, Olympic cyclist (b. 1957)
- 17 March – Ian Shelton, Australian rules footballer (Essendon) (b. 1940)
- 20 March
  - Taryn Fiebig, opera soprano (b. 1972)
  - Robert Gard, opera tenor (born in the United Kingdom) (b. 1927)
  - Fred Jones, rugby league player (b. 1942)
  - Bruce Wilson, Anglican bishop (b. 1942)
- 23 March – Reg Poole, Australian rules footballer (Hawthorn) (b. 1942)
- 26 March
  - John Richard Davey, cricketer (born in the United Kingdom) (b. 1957)
  - Vili Milisits, pastry chef and businessperson (born in Hungary) (b. 1948)
- 27 March – Peter Fox, computer scientist (died in the United States) (b. 1959)
- 31 March – Angelo Bertoni, Queensland politician (b. 1933)

=== April ===
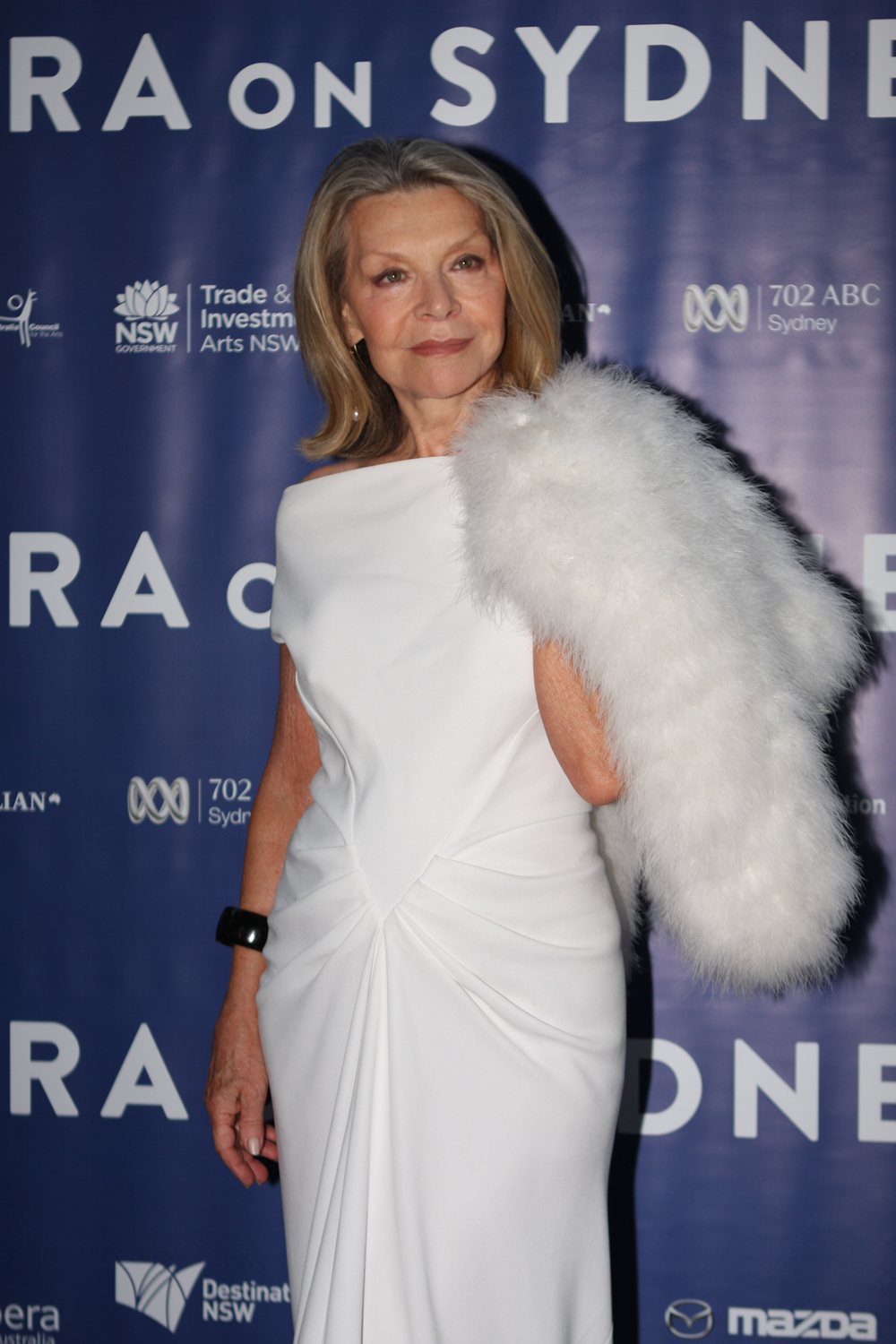
Carla Zampatti

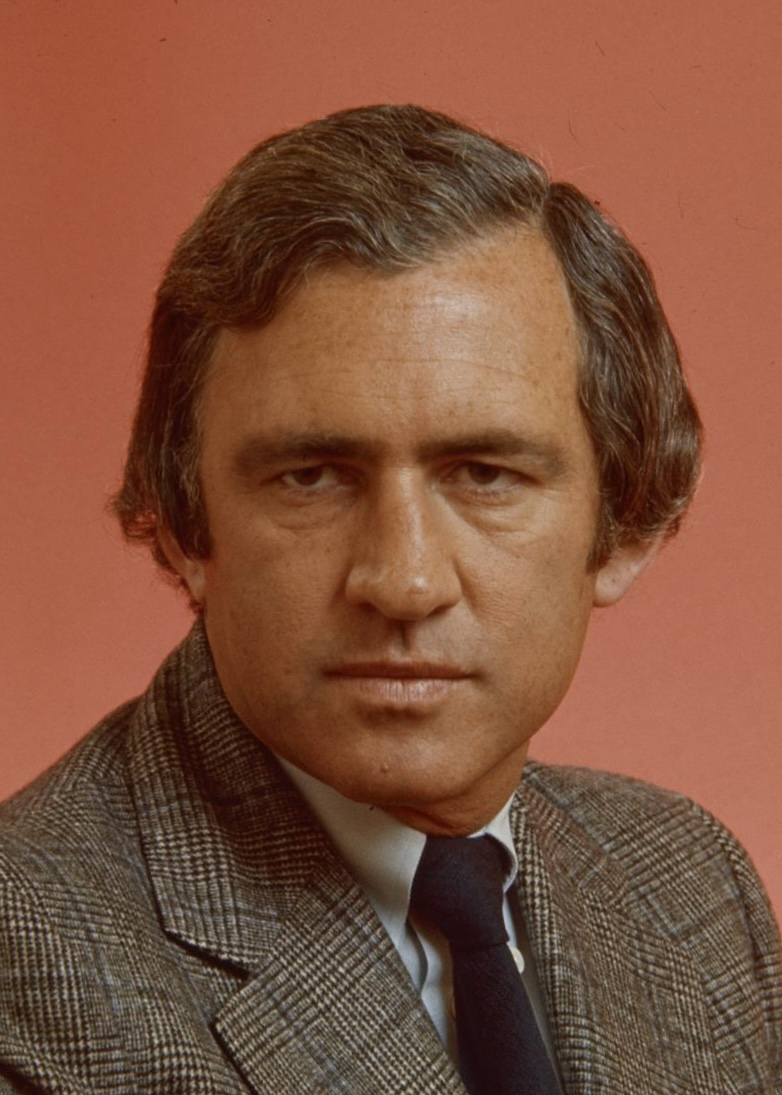
Andrew Peacock

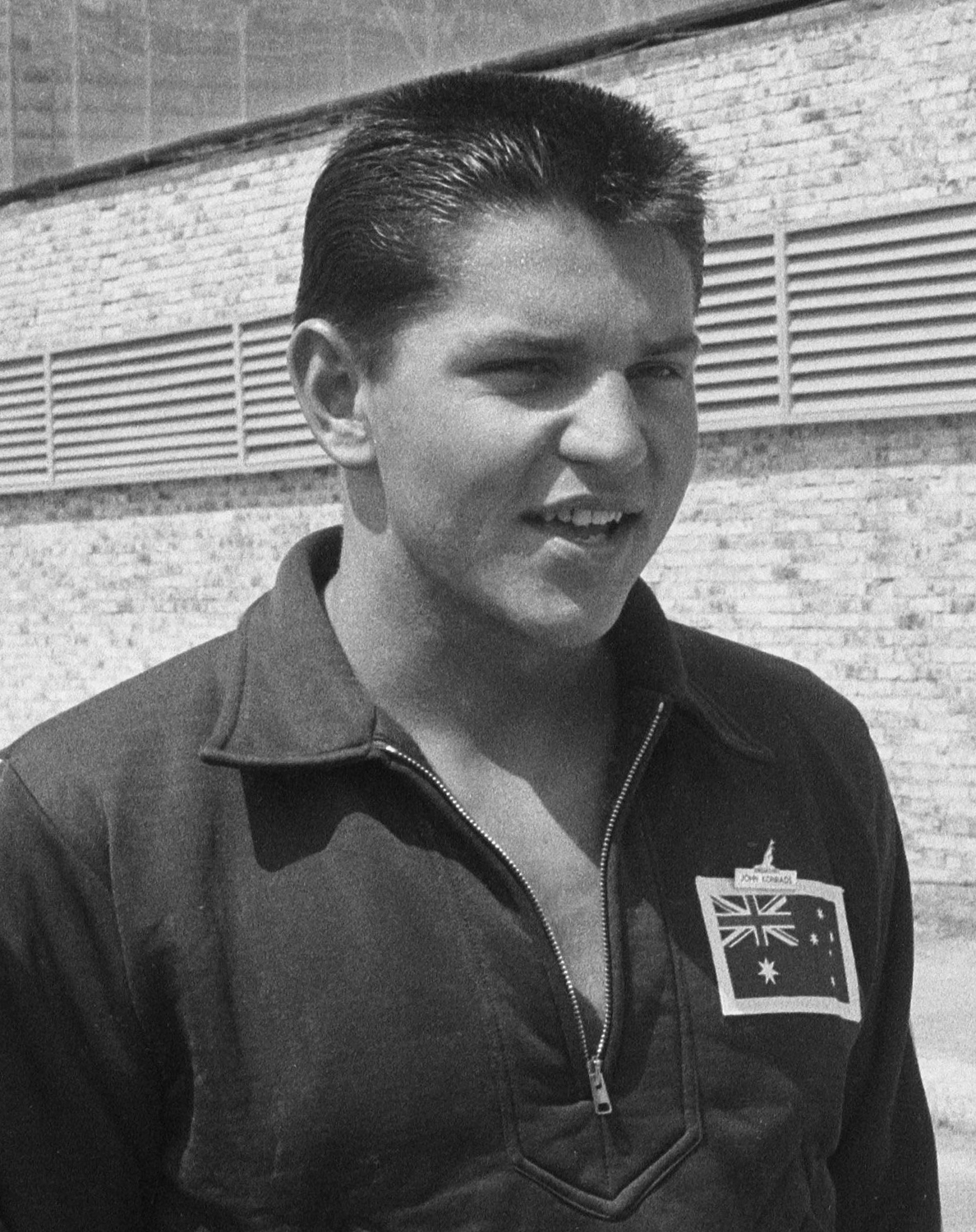
John Konrads

- 2 April – Tony Pola, drummer (Beasts of Bourbon) (b. 1959)
- 3 April – Carla Zampatti, fashion designer (born in Italy) (b. 1938)
- 5 April
  - Isabel Joy Bear, chemist (b. 1927)
  - Philip K. Chapman, astronaut (died in the United States) (b. 1935)
  - Malcolm Kela Smith, Papua New Guinean politician (born in the United Kingdom) (b. 1943)
- 7 April – Tommy Raudonikis, rugby league player (b. 1950)
- 9 April – June Newton, actress, photographer and model (died in Monaco) (b. 1923)
- 10 April – Edward Cassidy, Catholic cardinal (b. 1924)
- 11 April – Dick Fenton-Smith, Australian rules footballer (Melbourne) (b. 1931)
- 13 April
  - Isi Leibler, activist (born in Belgium and died in Israel) (b. 1931)
  - Peter Warner, sailor (b. 1931)
- 14 April
  - Trader Faulkner, actor (died in the United Kingdom) (b. 1927)
  - Graeme Lee, Australian rules footballer (St Kilda) (b. 1939)
  - Leo Nosworthy, rugby league player (b. 1927)
- 15 April – Walter Kaufmann, writer (born and died in Germany) (b. 1924)
- 16 April
  - Daniel Kane, linguist (b. 1948)
  - Andrew Peacock, 22nd Federal Leader of the Opposition (died in the United States) (b. 1939)
- 17 April – John Brereton, Australian rules footballer (Footscray) (b. 1934)
- 18 April – Ken Greenwood, Australian rules footballer (Carlton, Footscray) (b. 1941)
- 20 April
  - Rex Aubrey, Olympic swimmer (died in the United States) (b. 1935)
  - George Dancis, Olympic basketballer (born in Latvia) (b. 1931)
- 21 April – Peter Dimond, rugby league player (b. 1938)
- 22 April – Bill Cameron, Australian rules footballer (St Kilda) (b. 1928)
- 25 April
  - John Konrads, Olympic swimmer (born in Ostland) (b. 1942)
  - Valerie Parv, author (b. 1951)
- 28 April – Anita Lane, singer-songwriter (b. 1959)
- 29 April – Terry Groom, Tasmanian politician (b. 1944)

=== May ===
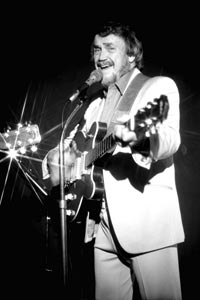
Johnny Ashcroft

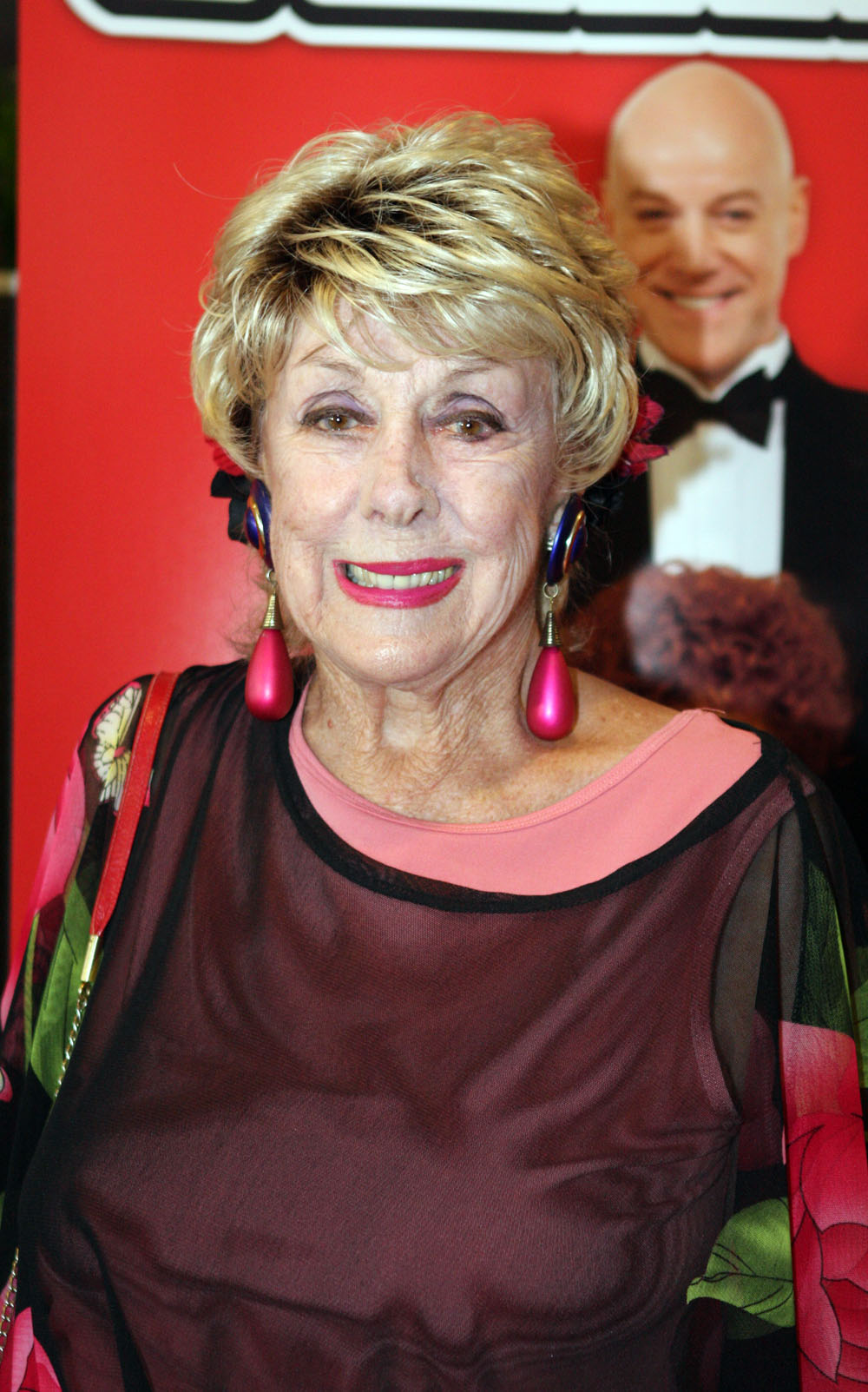
Lorrae Desmond

- 1 May
  - Peter Heerey, Federal Court judge (b. 1939)
  - Kate Jennings, poet and writer (died in the United States) (b. 1948)
  - Barry Nelson, rugby league player (b. 1932)
- 2 May
  - Frank Costa, entrepreneur and philanthropist (b. 1938)
  - David Humphreys, Olympic cyclist (b. 1936)
- 5 May
  - Barry Reilly, rugby league player (b. 1948)
  - Frank Sheehan, Victorian politician (b. 1937)
- 6 May – Murray Hedgcock, cricket writer and journalist (b. 1931)
- 7 May – David McCall, Anglican bishop (b. 1940)
- 10 May
  - Frank Brazier, Australian Olympic cyclist (b. 1934)
  - Brendan Edwards, Australian rules footballer (Hawthorn) (b. 1936)
- 11 May
  - Russell Goodrick, Western Australian newsreader and television producer (born in the United Kingdom) (b. 1948)
  - Frank Warrick, Queensland newsreader (b. 1944)
- 12 May – Fred Buttsworth, Australian rules footballer (Essendon) (b. 1927)
- 13 May – Ian Brusasco, businessman and philanthropist (b. 1928)
- 14 May – Hartley Joynt, cricketer (b. 1938)
- 15 May – Carol Rudyard, visual artist (born in the United Kingdom) (b. 1922)
- 16 May – Vera Deacon, historian (b. 1926)
- 18 May
  - Terry O'Dea, darts player (b. 1945)
  - Chrissy Sharp, Western Australian politician (b. 1947)
- 19 May – Johnny Ashcroft, country musician (b. 1927)
- 20 May – Ray Thomas, Australian rules footballer (Collingwood) (b. 1940)
- 21 May – Harold Lambert, Australian rules footballer (Essendon) (b. 1922)
- 23 May
  - Lorrae Desmond, actress, singer and television presenter (b. 1929)
  - Bob Fulton, rugby league footballer and coach (born in the United Kingdom) (b. 1947)
  - Alan Garside, soccer player (b. 1926)
  - Douglas Winston, sprinter (b. 1932)
- 24 May – Ron Rhodes, Australian rules footballer (Carlton) (b. 1932)
- 26 May – Sir Llew Edwards, 23rd Deputy Premier of Queensland (b. 1935)
- 28 May
  - Ian Marsh, Australian rules footballer (Essendon) (b. 1955)
  - Ken McElligott, Queensland politician (b. 1940)
- 29 May – John Gregg, actor (b. 1939)
- 30 May
  - Neville Meaney, historian (b. 1932)
  - Rick Mitchell, Olympic sprinter (b. 1955)
- 31 May
  - Dave Barsley, rugby league player (b. 1939)
  - James Crawford, international jurist (b. 1948)

=== June ===
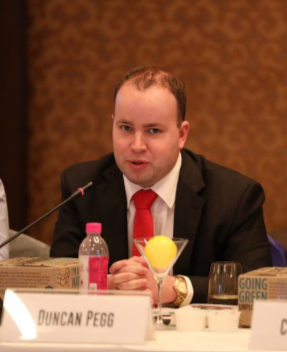
Duncan Pegg

- 5 June – Lucette Aldous, ballerina (born in New Zealand) (b. 1938)
- 8 June
  - Gloria Petyarre, artist (b. 1942)
  - Tim Pickup, rugby league player (b. 1948)
- 10 June – Duncan Pegg, Queensland politician (b. 1980)
- 11 June
  - Geoffrey Edelsten, medical entrepreneur (b. 1943)
  - Howard Sattler, radio host (b. 1945)
- 13 June – David Lightfoot, film producer (b. 1959 or 1960)
- 14 June – Dinah Shearing, actress (b. 1926)
- 18 June – John Martyr, Western Australian politician (b. 1932)
- 20 June
  - Mike Bailey, television presenter (b. 1950)
  - Harry Cameron, rugby league player (b. 1947)
  - Neville Sillitoe, athletics coach (b. 1925)
- 22 June
  - Chloe Munro, public servant (b. unknown)
  - Derek Fuller Wrigley, architect (born in the United Kingdom) (b. 1924)
- 23 June – Barbara Sargeant, Olympic swimmer (b. 1940)
- 27 June – Greg Sizer, Australian rules footballer (Melbourne) (b. 1965)

=== July ===
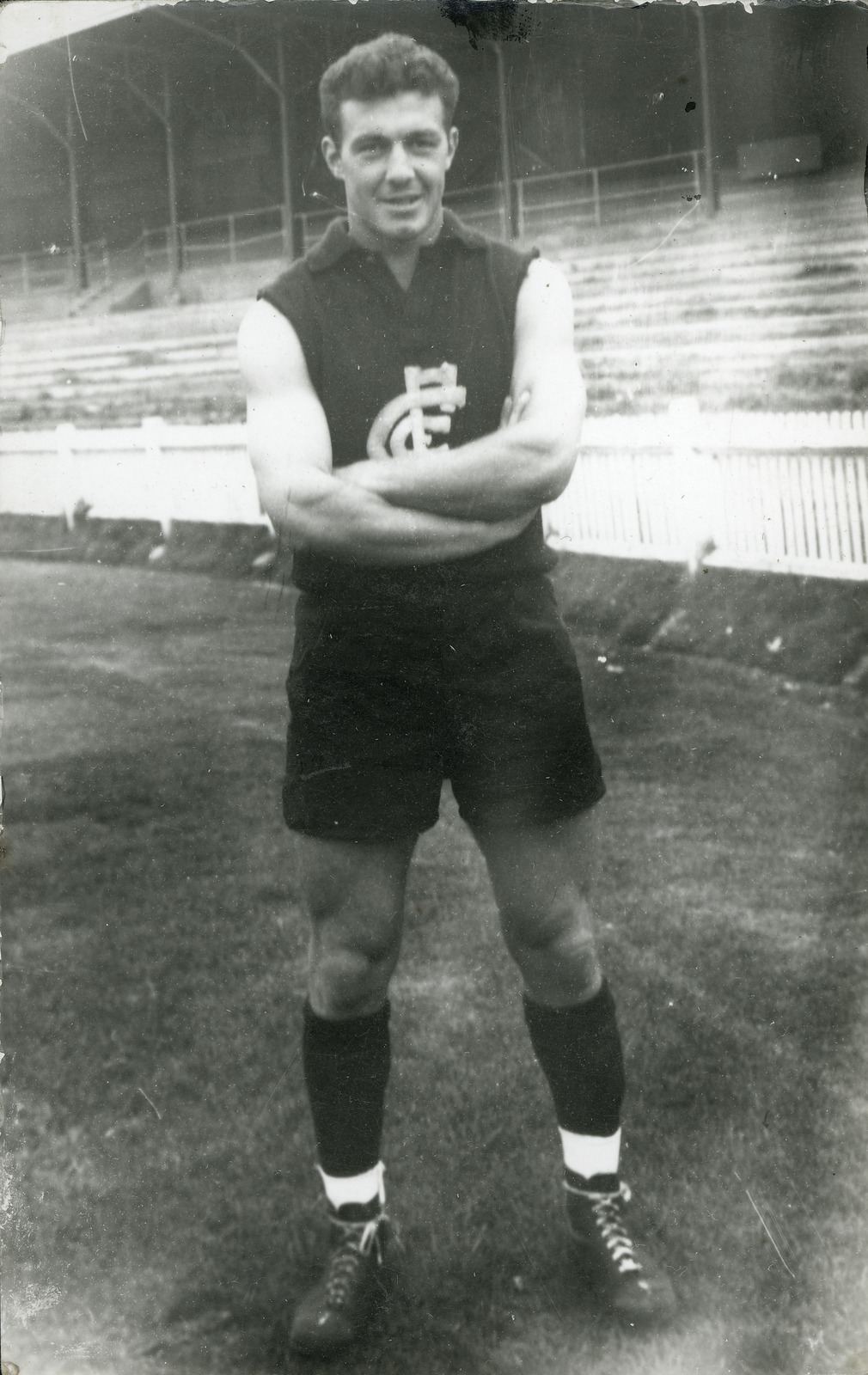
Sergio Silvagni

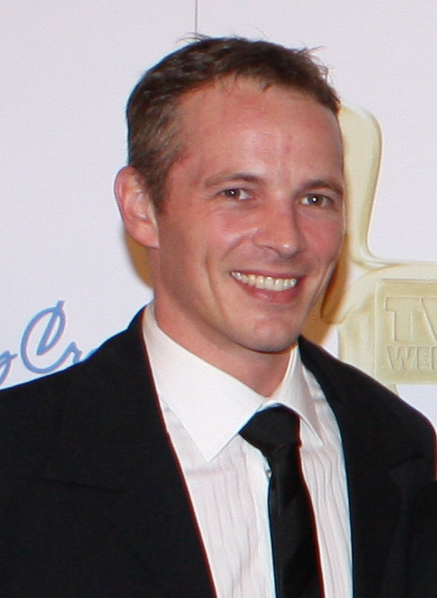
Dieter Brummer

- 3 July – Patrick Murray, Olympic sport shooter (born in the United Kingdom) (b. 1945)
- 4 July
  - Laurence Harding-Smith, fencer (b. 1929)
  - John McGrath, Victorian politician (b. 1939)
- 6 July
  - Mike Delanty, Australian rules footballer (Collingwood) (b. 1936)
  - Colin McKee, South Australian politician (b. 1949)
- 9 July – Jonathan Coleman, radio and television presenter (born in the United Kingdom) (b. 1956)
- 10 July – Mandy Martin, artist (b. 1952)
- 12 July – Banduk Marika, Indigenous artist and printmaker (b. 1954)
- 15 July
  - Harry Gayfer, Western Australian politician (b. 1925)
  - Sergio Silvagni, Australian rules footballer (Carlton) (b. 1938)
- 16 July – Anthony Adams, optometrist (b. 1940)
- 19 July – Mary Ward, actress (b. 1915)
- 20 July
  - David Leckie, media executive (b. 1951)
  - Dexter Kruger, Australian supercentanarian and oldest verified man in Australian history (b. 1910)
  - Brian O'Halloran, Australian rules footballer (North Melbourne) (b. 1937)
- 23 July – John Cornell, film producer, actor, comedian and writer (b. 1941)
- 24 July – Dieter Brummer, actor (b. 1976)
- 25 July – Phil Lambert, television camera operator and floor manager (b. 1950)
- 27 July
  - Jack Hedley, Australian rules footballer (North Melbourne) (b. 1930)
  - Hal Wootten, puisne judge of the Supreme Court of New South Wales (b. 1922)
- 28 July – Dick Long, Victorian politician (b. 1924)
- 30 July – John Lord, Australian rules footballer (Melbourne) (b. 1937)

=== August ===
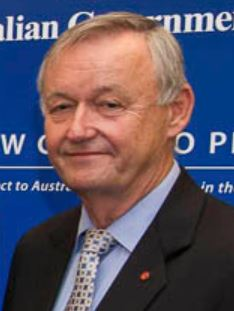
Alex Gallacher

- 3 August – Julian Beale, Victorian politician (b. 1934)
- 5 August
  - Reg Gorman, actor (b. 1932)
  - Brian Henderson, newsreader and television host (born in New Zealand) (b. 1931)
  - Jan Mayman, journalist (b. 1940)
  - Graeme Whitnall, Australian rules footballer (Carlton) (b. 1952)
- 6 August – Margaret Bourke, bridge player (b. 1945)
- 7 August – Brad Allan, martial artist and stunt performer (b. 1973)
- 10 August – Michael Gaudion, Australian rules footballer (North Melbourne) (b. 1938)
- 15 August
  - Philip James Ayres, biographer and historian (b. 1944)
  - Ernie Sigley, television and radio personality (b. 1938)
- 18 August
  - Eric Poole, Northern Territory politician (died in Indonesia) (b. 1942)
  - Max Willis, New South Wales politician (b. 1935)
- 19 August
  - Gary Bouma, sociologist of religion (born in the United States) (b. 1942)
  - Bill Sidwell, tennis player (b. 1920)
  - Keith Webb, Australian rules footballer (Fitzroy) (b. 1933)
- 24 August
  - Kyle Anderson, darts player (b. 1987)
  - Wynn Roberts, actor (b. 1924)
- 25 August – Leo Gately, Queensland politician (b. 1937)
- 27 August
  - Anne Jolliffe, animator (b. 1933)
  - Joan Whalley, actress (b. 1927)
- 30 August – Alex Gallacher, South Australian politician (b. 1954)
- 31 August – Les Martyn, sports administrator (b. 1932)

=== September ===
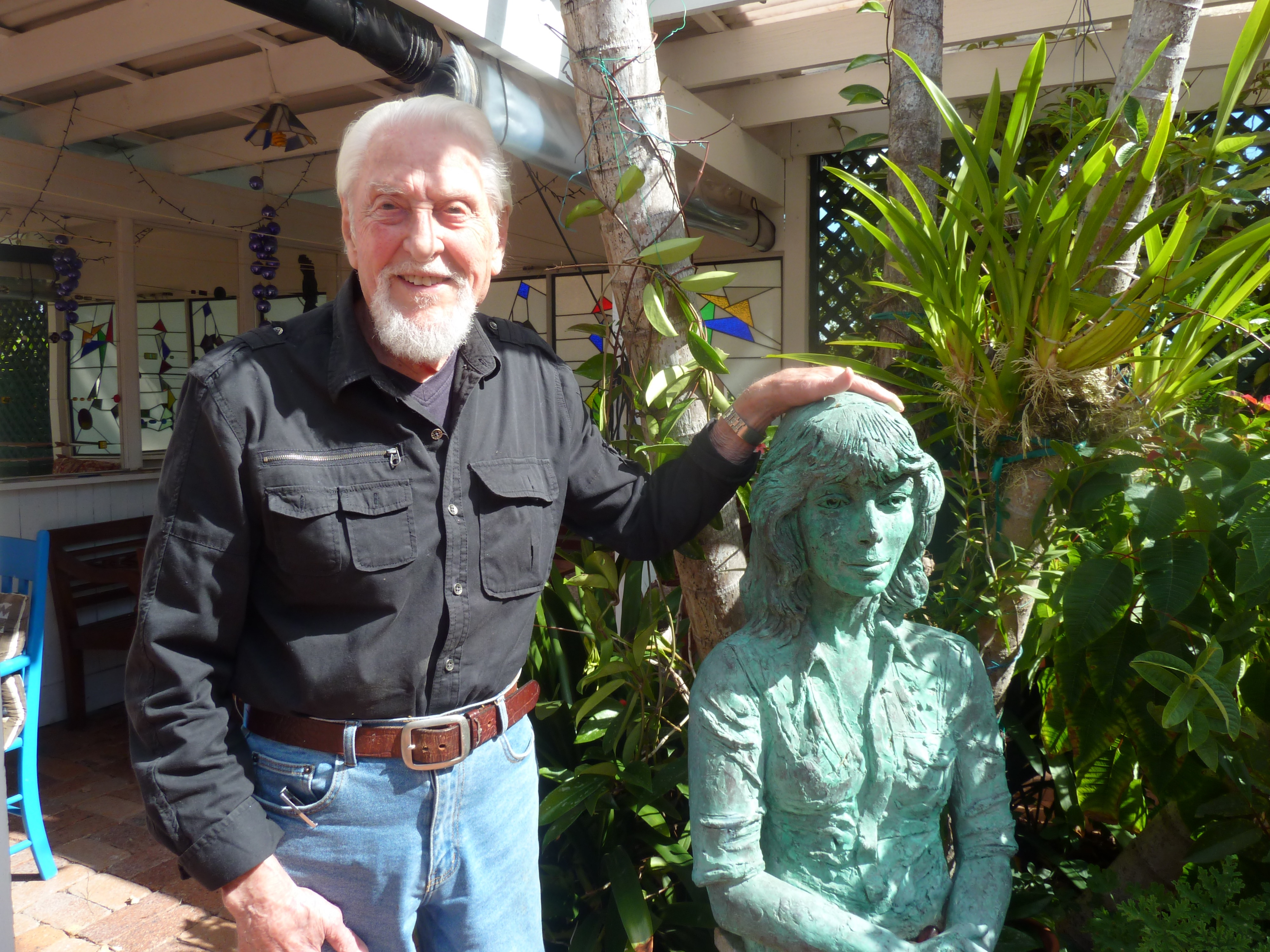
Marc Clark

- 1 September – Margaret Stone, Federal Court judge (b. unknown)
- 8 September – Neddy Smith, serial criminal and underworld figure (b. 1944)
- 12 September – Marc Clark, academic, sculptor and printmaker (born in the United Kingdom) (b. 1923)
- 13 September – Kathleen Partridge, Olympic field hockey player (b. 1963)
- 16 September – Tim Thorne, poet (b. 1944)
- 21 September – Dallas Dempster, property developer (b. 1941)
- 23 September – John Elliott, businessman (b. 1941)
- 25 September – Greg Parke, Australian rules footballer (Melbourne, Footscray) (b. 1948)
- 26 September – Al Mantello, Australian rules footballer (North Melbourne) (b. 1934)
- 29 September
  - Jim Service, company director (b. 1933)
  - Angelo Vasta, Queensland Supreme Court judge (b. 1941)

=== October ===
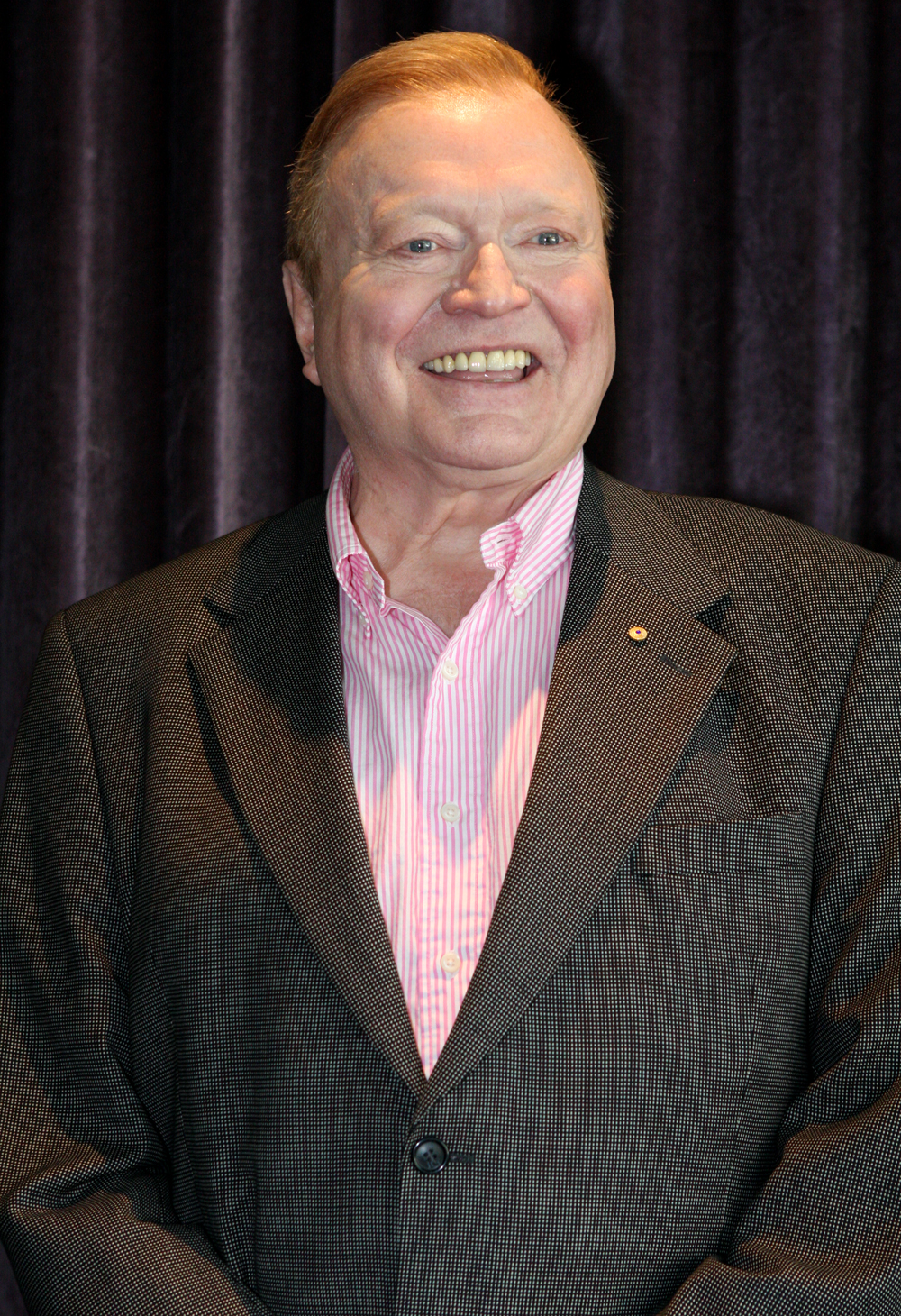
Bert Newton

- 3 October – Paul Barratt, public servant (b. 1944)
- 11 October – Clifford Grant, operatic singer (b. 1930)
- 11 October – Kevin Hallett, Olympic swimmer (b. 1929)
- 12 October – Eddie Jaku, writer and Holocaust survivor (born in Germany) (b. 1920)
- 13 October – Norm Provan, rugby league player (b. 1931)
- 14 October – Rodney Jory, physicist (b. 1938)
- 16 October – Kevin Hevey, Australian rules footballer (Hawthorn) (b. 1923)
- 20 October – Nyapanyapa Yunupingu, artist (b. 1945)
- 22 October – Dave Cuzens, Australian rules footballer (Richmond) (b. 1932)
- 26 October – Russell Woolf, radio presenter (b. 1964)
- 28 October – Ray Allsopp, Australian rules footballer (Richmond) (b. 1933)
- 29 October
  - Ashley Mallett, cricketer (b. 1945)
  - Jim Small, New South Wales politician (b. 1933)
- 30 October
  - Alan Davidson, cricketer (b. 1929)
  - Bert Newton, media personality (b. 1938)
- 31 October – Peter Philpott, cricketer (b. 1934)

=== November ===
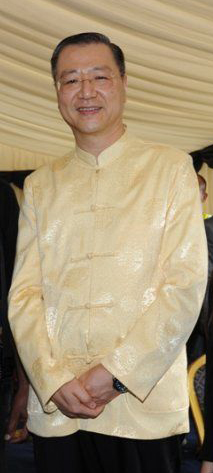
Jun Hong Lu

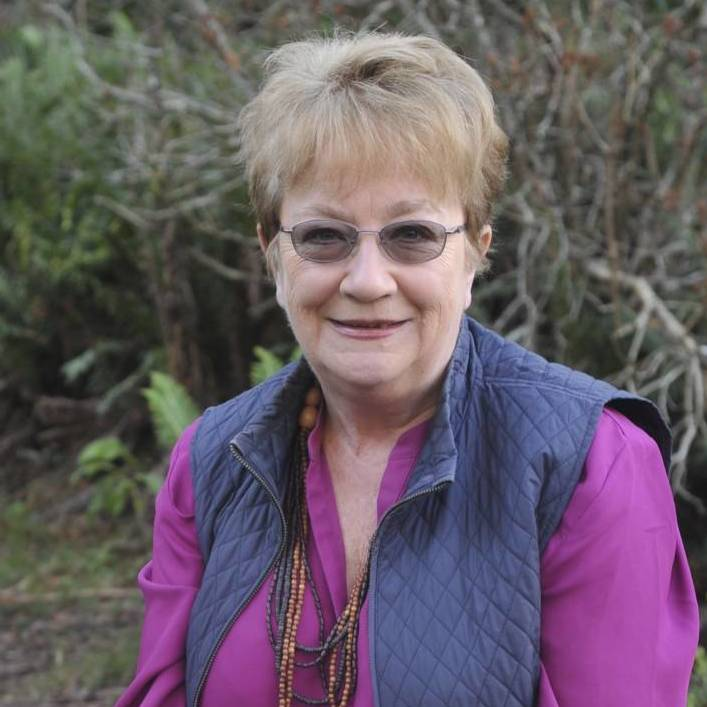
Babette Smith

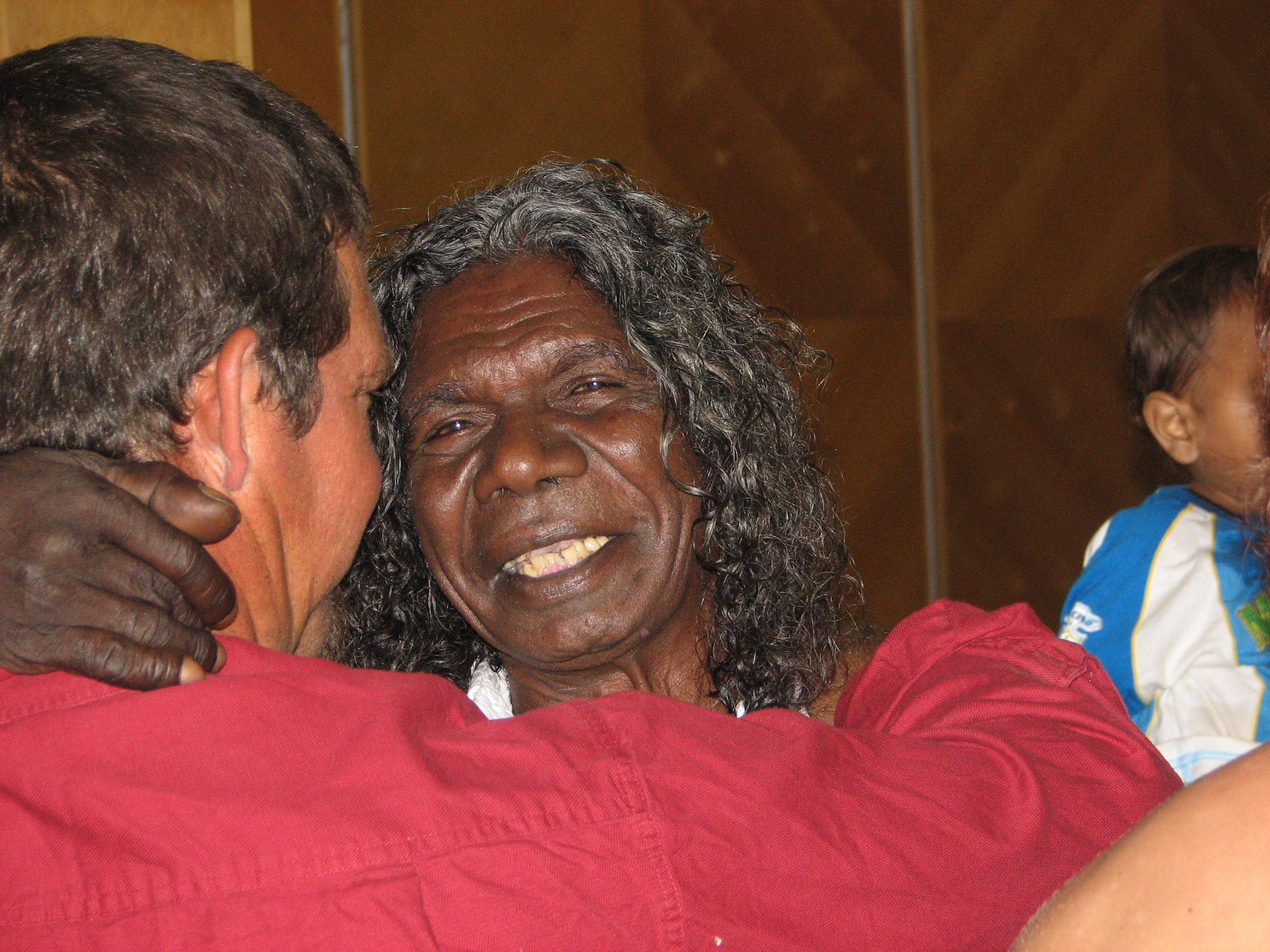
David Gulpilil

- 1 November – Bruno Moretti, Paralympic champion (b. 1941)
- 5 November
  - Bob Dollin, Queensland politician (b. 1928)
  - Russell Ebert, Australian rules footballer (Port Adelaide, North Melbourne) (b. 1949)
- 7 November
  - Sir James Gobbo, 25th Governor of Victoria (b. 1931)
  - Brian Renwood, Australian rules footballer (Collingwood) (b. 1935)
- 8 November – Keith Bradshaw, cricketer (b. 1963)
- 9 November – Sean Higgins, musician and songwriter (b. 1953)
- 10 November – Jun Hong Lu, religious leader (born in China) (b. 1959)
- 11 November – Mark Gillespie, musician and songwriter (b. 1950)
- 12 November – Jim Fouras, Queensland politician (b. 1938)
- 13 November – William Wright, bishop (born in the United States) (b. 1952)
- 15 November – Jason Plummer, Olympic swimmer (b. 1969)
- 17 November
  - Ken Colvin, Australian rules footballer (South Melbourne) (b. 1938)
  - Max Olding, pianist (b. 1929)
- 18 November – Geoffrey Giudice, judge and president of Fair Work Australia (b. 1947)
- 20 November – Don Grimes, Tasmanian politician (b. 1937)
- 22 November
  - Stuart Macintyre, historian (b. 1947)
  - Doug MacLeod, children's writer, poet, screenwriter and playwright (b. 1959)
  - Babette Smith, historian (b. 1942)
- 25 November – Peter Kanis, Australian rules footballer (Hawthorn) (b. 1931)
- 26 November
  - Keith De Lacy, Queensland politician (b. 1940)
  - Desmond O'Grady, journalist and author (died in Rome) (b. 1929)
- 29 November – David Gulpilil, actor and dancer (b. 1953)
- 30 November – Sir Max Bingham, 9th Deputy Premier of Tasmania (b. 1927)

=== December ===
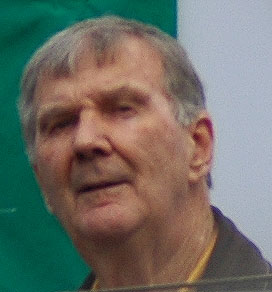
Peter Cundall

- 2 December – Christian Kerr, political commentator and journalist (b. 1965)
- 4 December – Percy Johnson, Australian rules footballer (b. 1933)
- 5 December – Peter Cundall, horticulturalist and television presenter (born in the United Kingdom) (b. 1927)
- 7 December – Geoffrey Harcourt, economist (b. 1931)
- 11 December – Dennis Ward, rugby league footballer (b. 1947)
- 13 December – John Nolan, guitarist (b. 1966)
- 16 December
  - Peter Mulholland, rugby league footballer and coach (b. 1953)
  - Robie Porter, musician and record producer (b. 1941)
- 17 December – Lindsay Tebbutt, drummer and songwriter (b. 1957)
- 23 December – Keith Rae, Australian rules footballer (Carlton, Richmond) (b. 1917)
- 25 December – John Gleeson, rugby league footballer (b. 1938)
- 26 December
  - Paul B. Kidd, author, journalist, and radio show host (b. 1945)
  - Barclay Wade, rower (b. 1944)
- 28 December
  - Ted Gardner, music manager and entrepreneur (b. 1947)
  - Don Whitten, Australian rules footballer (Footscray) (b. 1935)
- 30 December – George Brenner, New South Wales politician (born in Hungary) (b. 1929)

== See also ==
=== Country overviews ===
- 2020s in Australia political history
- 2021 in Australian literature
- 2021 in Australian television
- Government of Australia
- History of Australia
- History of modern Australia
- List of Australian films of 2021
- Outline of Australia
- Politics of Australia
- Timeline of Australia history
- Years in Australia
