= Master Lu =

Master Lu may refer to:

- Zilu (lit. "Master Lu"), one of the Twelve Philosophers of traditional Confucianism
- Lu Sheng-yen (born 1945), commonly referred to by followers as Grand Master Lu (師尊), the founder of the True Buddha School
- The Riddle of Master Lu, a 1996 adventure game
- Jun Hong Lu (1959–2021), Master Jun Hong Lu or Master Lu (卢台长), Chinese-born Australian Buddhist faith healer
