= 2021 in Australian television =

This is a list of Australian television-related events, debuts, finales, and cancellations that were scheduled to occur in 2021, the 66th year of continuous operation of television in Australia.

== Events ==
=== March ===
Date	Event	Source
12	Nine Entertainment Co. and WIN Corporation announce a new affiliation agreement to begin 1 July with WIN Television stations to carry Nine programming. Southern Cross Austereo owned stations will return to Network 10 programming. Northern NSW stations NBN (owned by Nine) and NRN (owned by WIN) will not be impacted by the new agreement, but as part of the new affiliation agreement, WIN will act as NBN's sales agent effective July 1.	

=== June ===
Date	Event	Source
23	Network Ten renew their affiliation agreement with WIN Television for Northern New South Wales for an additional five years. The new agreement begins 1 July 2021.	

=== July ===
Date	Event	Source
23	The Seven Network broadcasts the 2020 Summer Olympics.	

=== August ===
Date	Event	Source
13	The Ellen DeGeneres Show is axed by the Nine Network, ending its 13-year run on the network (preceded by a short run on Network 10.) It leaves Dr. Phil (broadcast on Network 10) as the only remaining U.S. daytime talk show currently broadcast on Australian free-to-air television. A week later, Foxtel announces it is dropping the rights to the show as well.	

=== November ===
Date	Event	Source
8	Nine-owned regional station NBN commences local news production at its new Honeysuckle headquarters, following nearly 60 years of operation from its Mosbri Crescent studios, which was sold to property developers several years ago.	

=== December ===
Date	Event	Source
23	Prime Media Group shareholders agree to a $132 million takeover from Seven West Media with the merger to take effect on January 1, 2022.	

== Television channels ==
=== New channels/streaming services ===
Date	Channel
23 February	Star (Via Disney+)
11 August	Paramount+
October 14	Flash

=== Affiliation changes ===
- 1 July – Nine Network programming to air on WIN Television owned and operated stations (excluding NRN)
- 1 July – Network Ten programming to air on Southern Cross Austereo owned and operated stations.

== Premieres ==
=== Domestic series ===
List of domestic television series premieres
Program	Original airdate	Network	Source
Stutter School	5 January	SBS	
Birdsville or Bust	12 January	SBS	
Bowled Over	19 January	SBS	
Kangaroo Beach	25 January	ABC Kids	
Holey Moley	1 February	Seven Network	
Aftertaste	3 February	ABC Television	
Three Blue Ducks	13 February	Network 10	
Why Are You Like This	16 February	ABC TV Plus	
The Cube	24 February	Network 10	
Space Invaders	27 February	Nine Network	
Under Investigation with Liz Hayes	1 March	Nine Network	
Amazing Grace	3 March	Nine Network	
Mega Zoo	4 March	Nine Network	
Space Nova	5 March (9Go!), 2 April (ABC Me)	9Go! ABC Me	
Ultimate Tag	7 March	Seven Network	
Fisk	17 March	ABC	
Advancing Australia	27 March	Network 10	
Wakefield	2 April (iview), 18 April (TV)	ABC Television	
See What You Made Me Do	5 May	SBS	
Art Works	5 May	ABC Television	
The Unusual Suspects	3 June	SBS	
Win the Week	23 June	ABC Television	
Movin' to the Country	2 July	ABC Television	
Life in Colour	3 July	Nine Network	
Luxe Listings Sydney	9 July	Amazon Prime Video	
Ms Represented	13 July	ABC Television	
The Cheap Seats	20 July	Network 10	
Australia: Now and Then	10 August	Seven Network	
Back to Nature	10 August	ABC Television	
The Hundred with Andy Lee	10 August	Nine Network	
RFDS	11 August	Seven Network	
The Newsreader	15 August	ABC Television	
Homicide with Ron Iddles	15 August	Seven Network	
Beyond the Towers	16 August	ABC Television	
Question Everything	18 August	ABC Television	
What Does Australia Really Think About...	18 August	SBS	
Nurses	18 August	Seven Network	
Inside Central Station: Australia's Busiest Railway	12 September	SBS	
The School That Tried to End Racism	21 September	ABC Television	
Lie With Me	TBA	Network 10	

=== International series ===
List of international television series premieres
Program	Original airdate	Network	Country of origin	Source
Radiant	2 January	ABC Me	Japan	
Gigantosaurus	1 March	9Go!	France/Canada	
Lego Monkie Kid	13 March	9Go!	Denmark/China	
Beyblade Burst Surge (season 5)	15 March	9Go!	Japan	
Bakugan: Geogan Rising (season 3)	20 March	9Go!	Canada/Japan	
Droners	4 June	ABC Me	France	
Log Horizon	23 October	ABC Me	Japan	

== Programming changes ==
=== Changes to network affiliation ===
Criterion for inclusion in the following list is that Australian premiere episodes will air in Australia for the first time on a new channel. This includes when a program is moved from a free-to-air network's primary channel to a digital multi-channel, as well as when a program moves between subscription television channels – provided the preceding criterion is met. Ended television series which change networks for repeat broadcasts are not included in the list.

List of domestic television series which changed network affiliation
Program	Date	New network	Previous network	Source
Dancing with the Stars	11 April	Seven Network	Network 10	
The Voice	8 August	Seven Network	Nine Network	
Five Bedrooms	11 August	Paramount+	Network 10	

List of international television programs which changed network affiliation
Program	Date	New network	Previous network	Country of origin	Source

=== Free-to-air premieres ===
This is a list of programs which made their premiere on Australian free-to-air television that had previously premiered on Australian subscription television. Programs may still air on the original subscription television network.

List of international television programs which premiered on free-to-air television for the first time
Program	Date	Free-to-air network	Subscription network(s)	Country of origin	Source

=== Subscription premieres ===
This is a list of programs which made their debut on Australian subscription television, having previously premiered on Australian free-to-air television. Programs may still air (first or repeat) on the original free-to-air television network.

List of domestic television programs which premiered on subscription television for the first time
Program	Date	Free-to-air network	Subscription network(s)	Source

=== Returning programs ===
Australian produced programs which are returning with a new season after being absent from television from the previous calendar year.

Show	Return date	Previous run	Type of return	Previous channel	New/same channel	Source
H_{2}O: Just Add Water (as H_{2}O: Just Add More Water)	Autumn	2008–2010	Revival	Network 10	Disney+	
Territory Cops	25 February	2012–2016; intermittently	New season	Network 10	same	
The Celebrity Apprentice Australia	23 May	2011–2015	New season	Nine Network	same	
The Weakest Link	25 May^{a}	2001–2002	New season	Seven Network	Nine Network	
Beauty & the Geek Australia	11 June	2009–2014	New season	Seven Network	Nine Network	

^{a} Was originally due to premiere on 4 May 2021, but was delayed by three weeks due to a tight production schedule.

=== Endings ===
List of domestic television series endings
Program	End date	Network	Start date	Source
The Mix	27 March 2021	ABC	14 June 2014	
Doctor Doctor	23 June 2021	Nine Network	14 September 2016	
Totally Wild	27 June 2021	Network 10	12 July 1992	

== Deaths ==
Name	Date	Age	Field	Broadcasting notability	Reference
Gaynor Bunning	12 January	aged 82	Radio variety and Melbourne TV personality	The Gaynor Bunning Show, Teenage Mailbag, The Bobby Limb Show In Melbourne Tonight, Pot Luck	
Trisha Noble	23 January	aged 76	Singer and Actress	Bandstand	
Russell Goodrick	11 May	not given	Radio personality, DJ and TV news presenter, businessman (although worked in London, England)	Nine News	
Mary Rossi	25 May	aged 95	Television presenter	Woman's World	
John Gregg (actor)	1 June	aged 82	Theatre, TV and film actor, and voice over artist	Contrabandits, Delta	
Dinah Shearing	20 June	aged 95	Actress, known for numerous plays and TV series	Othello, Family and Friends	
Reg Gorman	6 August	aged 82	TV actor	The Sullivans	
Wynn Roberts	2 September	aged 97	Radio, theatre and television	Prisoner, Neighbours and Law of the Land	
Doug Parkinson	15 March	aged 74	Musician and actor	The Young Doctors, Always Greener, Shadows of the Heart	
Frank Warrick	11 May	aged 76	Newsreader and presenter	Seven News, Nine News, The World Around Us, The $1,000,000 Chance of a Lifetime	
Lorrae Desmond	23 May	aged 91	Singer and actress	The Lorrae Desmond Show, A Country Practice	
Mike Bailey	20 July	aged 71	Television and radio weather presenter	ABC News, Seven News.	
Jonathan "Jono" Coleman	9 July	aged 65	English-born radio and television presenter	Simon Townsend's Wonder World, Studio 10	
Mary Ward	19 July	aged 106,	Actress and broadcaster	Prisoner, Sons and Daughters	
David Leckie	20 July	aged 70	Network television executive	Media executive of Nine Network, Seven Network	
John Cornell	23 July	aged 80	Actor, director, producer and writer	The Paul Hogan Show	
Dieter Brummer	24 July	aged 45,	Actor	Home and Away, Underbelly, Neighbours	
Phil Lambert	25 July	aged 71	Camera operator and floor manager	Hey Hey It's Saturday	
Brian Henderson	5 August	aged 89	Newsreader and presenter	Nine News, Bandstand	
Ernie Sigley	15 August	aged 82	Radio and television presenter	Sunnyside Up, Adelaide Tonight, The Ernie Sigley Show, Wheel of Fortune, In Melbourne Today	
Bert Newton	30 October	aged 83,	Radio and television personality	In Melbourne Tonight, The Bert Newton Show, New Faces, Good Morning Australia, Berts Family Feud	
Beverley Dunn	27 November	aged 88	Film, TV, voicexandxradio	Shine	

== See also ==
- 2021 in Australia
- List of Australian films of 2021
