= List of Australian films of 2021 =

This is a list of Australian films that were released in 2021.

== Feature films ==
Opening		Title	Director	Cast	Genre
J A N U A R Y	1	The Dry	Robert Connolly	Eric Bana, Genevieve O'Reilly, Keir O'Donnell	Crime / drama
J A N U A R Y	7	Maya the Bee: The Golden Orb	Noel Cleary	Benson Jack Anthony, Frances Berry, Christian Charisiou	Animation / adventure
J A N U A R Y	14	Ammonite	Francis Lee	Kate Winslet, Saoirse Ronan, Gemma Jones	Biography / romance
J A N U A R Y	21	Penguin Bloomf	Glendyn Ivin	Naomi Watts, Andrew Lincoln, Jacki Weaver	Drama
J A N U A R Y	28	High Ground	Stephen Maxwell Johnson	Jacob Junior Nayinggul, Simon Baker, Callan Mulvey	Meat pie western / "Northern"
J A N U A R Y	28	Occupation: Rainfall	Luke Sparke	Dan Ewing, Temuera Morrison, Daniel Gillies	Science-fiction / action
F E B R U A R Y	4	Daisy Quokka: World's Scariest Animal	Ricard Cussó	Angourie Rice, Sam Neill, Sharnee Tones	Animation
F E B R U A R Y	11	Long Story Short	Josh Lawson	Rafe Spall, Josh Lawson, Dena Kaplan	Comedy / romance
F E B R U A R Y	17	Wyrmwood: Apocalypse	Kiah Roache-Turner	Luke McKenzie, Shantae Barnes-Cowan, Jake Ryan, Bianca Bradey, Jay Gallagher	Horror
F E B R U A R Y	18	Firestarter	Wayne Blair Nel Minchin	Stephen Page	Documentary
J U N E	24	Buckley's Chance			
J U N E	29	Everybody Gets Stabbed	Levon J Polinelli	Nick Pages-Oliver, Daniel Buckle	Comedy / horror
D E C E M B E R	10	Back to the Outback	Netflix Animation; Reel FX Animation Studios; Weed Road Pictures; Screen NSW	Isla Fisher, Tim Minchin, Eric Bana, Guy Pearce, Miranda Tapsell, Angus Imrie, Keith Urban, Jacki Weaver	

== Short films ==
Title	Director	Cast	Genre
Alba	Senie Priti	Maya Robinson, Scott Johnson, Melanie Zanetti	Short
Antecedents	Emma Vickery	Nicola Bartlett, Hayley McElhinney	Short
An Athlete Wrestling A Python	Stephanie Jane Day	Josephine Starte, Tom Anson Mesker, Anthony Phelan	Short
Bala	Deborah Brown	Addie Bani, Michael Bani, Waangenga Blanco	Short
Bouche	Ruixuan Bai	Selena Lee-Marsh, Xuanyan Liu, Mercy Sang	Short
Call History	Lillian Paterson		Short
Carmentis	Antony Webb	Ben Mortley, Adriane Daff, Jo Morris	Short
Don't Forget To Go Home	Victoria Singh-Thompson	Remanika Chaundry, Monica Kumar, Joshua McElroy	Short
Ecdysis	Roscoe Portelli, William Stanforth	Dennis Coard, Verity Higgins, William Ewing	Short
Ella	Madison Novak	Danny Barton, Amy Fraser, Madelaine Hopkins	Short
The End, The Beginning	Archie Chew	Joanna Briant, Finn Dunne, Aria Ferris	Short
The Exit Plan	Angus Wilkinson	Paapa Essiedu, Marcia Warren	Short
The Familiars	Millicent Malcom	Milly Alcock, Helen Stuart, Julia Savage	Short
Furlough	Phoebe Tonkin	Ryan Corr, Milly Alcock, Markella Kavenagh	Short
The Gods Of Tiny Things	Deborah Kelly		Short
The Handyman	Nicholas Clifford		Short
Hannah & The Friend Zone	Holly Hargreaves	Holly Hargreaves, Lucy Lovegrove, Laura Wheelwright	
Harmonia	McLean Jackson	Lochie Laffin Vines, Georgia Balloch, Jay Bowen	Short, romance
Hyde	Ruby Challenger	Brendan Kelly, Jess Waterhouse	Short
Idol	Alex Wu	Nan Chen, Jiapei Wu, Yanying Wu	Short
If I Quit Now	Luke Wissell	Gabriel Carrubba, Tim Clarke, Nic Darrigo	Short
The Immortal	Carl Firth	Guy Edmonds, James Cromwell, Maeve Dermody	Short
In The Wake	Stephanie Jaclyn	Daisy Anderson, Jess Kuss, Tegan Nottle	Short
Inferno	Katherine Chediak Putnam	Sam Cotton, Keiran McGinlay, John McNeill	Short
Jean	Alisha Hnatjuk		Short
Joy	Gabriel Morrison	Ben Brock, Liz Harper, Isabel Macmaster	Short
Julia	James Weir	Clayton D. Moss, Chloe Schwank, Edmond Long	Short
Le Miroir	Leila Murton Poole	Michael Caton, Rachel Giddens, Vivienne Powell	Short
Liquid Moonlight	Hannah Ariotti, Anna McGahan	Jonathan Weir, Leon Cain, Georgia Flood	Short
The Listening	Milena Bennett		Short
Lost Boy	Peter Skinner	Michael Sheasby, Alexandra Nell, Ben Oxenbould	Short
Lovestruck	Benjamin Ryan	Tel Benjamin, Matt de Groot, Rachel Giddens	Short
A Man and a Cat	Kevin Spink	Thomas Cocquerel, Bryan Probets, Kevin Spink	Short
The Moogai	Jon Bell	Shari Sebbens, Meyne Wyatt	Short
Mother Bunker	George Metaxas		Short
Objects of my Disaffection	Sarah-Jane Woulahan	Dana Miltins	Short
Occupied	Ruby Lennon	Alex Stamell, Lauren Lloyd Williams, Priscilla Doueihy	Short
Painting By Numbers	Radheya Jegatheva		Short
Pools	Luisa Martiri	Malina Hamilton-Smith, Samantha Lush	Short
A Problematic Gesture Toward Auteur Theory	James Robert Woods	George Harrison Xanthis, Gary Boulter, Anna Phillips	Short
Prom Night	Lydia Rui		Short
Pyrocene	Johnny Milner	Dave Dexter, Johnny Milner	Short
The Reality	Trevor Clarence	Miranda Daughtry, Benjamin Dillon-Smith, Duncan Fellows	Short
Roborovski	Tilda Cobham-Hervey, Dev Patel	Tilda Cobham-Hervey, John Collee	Short
Saving Daylight	Benjamin Balte	Benjamin Balte, Amelia Foxton, Nate Gothard	Short
Smashed	Tyson Yates		Short
Soulmate	Nik Kacevski	Holly May Lewis, Stefania Kocheva, Martin Paunov	Short
Spark	Sophie Hawkshaw	Madeleine Jurd, Brendan Donoghue, Amanda Maple-Brown	Short
Sparkles	Jacqueline Pelczar	Bruce Denn, Siria Kickett, Gary Cooper	Short
The Story Of Lee Ping	Jasmin Tarasin		Short
Straight Outta Covid	Cesar Salmeron		Short
A Strange Season	Burak Oguz Saguner		Short
Sunburn	Jaslyn Mairs	Brenna Harding, Zoe Terakes	Short
The Swimming Chair	Matthew Taylor		Short
System Error	Matt Vesely	David Quirk, Nick Nemeroff, Chrissie Page	Short
Tâm	Noora Niasari	Nick Barkla, Jillian Nguyen	Short
This River	Naomi Fryer	Madeleine Magee Carr, Talisa Mayshack-Mendero	Short
This Town Ain't Big Enough for the Both Of Us	D.C. Fairhurst	Lucy Green, D.C. Fairhurst, Jessica-Belle Keogh	Short
Torch Song	Stephen Lance	Jordan Dulieu, Pippa Grandison, Luke Koster	Short
Waiyirri	Kiara Milera, Charlotte Rose	Kate Bonney, Michael Gilmour, James MacMhathain	Short
The Wake	Eddie Diamandi		Short
Widowers	Julian Tuna	Eddie Baroo, John Brumpton, Jennifer Davidson	Short
Wirun	Chad O'Brien		Short

== See also ==
- 2021 in Australia
- 2021 in Australian television
- List of 2021 box office number-one films in Australia
