= Jack Lockett =

Australian soldier and supercentenarian

Jack Lockett OAM
- Born: John Henry Lockett; 22 January 1891; Waanyarra, Victoria, Australia
- Died: 25 May 2002 (aged 111 years, 123 days); Bendigo, Victoria, Australia
- Military career
- Allegiance: Australia
- Branch: Australian Army
- Service years: 1916–1919
- Rank: Sergeant
- Unit: Australian Imperial Force
- Conflicts: World War I
- Awards: Medal of the Order of Australia; British War Medal; Victory Medal; 80th Anniversary Armistice Remembrance Medal; Centenary Medal Chevalier (Knight) of the Légion d'honneur

John Henry Lockett OAM (22 January 1891 – 25 May 2002) was the oldest man ever in Australia when he died aged 111 years, 123 days. As one of the last surviving veterans of World War I, he was acclaimed as a national hero during the last decade of his life.

== Life ==
Lockett was born in the small Victorian town of Waanyarra, near Bendigo. He left school aged nine to work on a local farm. Later, he worked for his uncles in The Mallee. On 24 March 1916, he travelled to Mildura to enlist in the Australian Imperial Force. He served in France with the 38th Battalion, earning promotion to sergeant and was discharged on 20 September 1919.

After the war, Lockett returned to The Mallee and selected a 640 acres (260 ha) block of land in Linga, Victoria, deciding to make his living as a farmer. In 1923, he married Maybell Ingwerson and they had four children together. In 1963, the couple retired to Bendigo, leaving the farmland (which now covered more than 130,000 acres (53,000 ha), in the care of their children and grandchildren.

After turning 100, Lockett was regarded in Australia as a "legend", "noted not only for his remarkable lucidity and age, but as one of Australia's few surviving World War I veterans." In 1998, Lockett and his known fellow surviving veterans were awarded Chevalier (Knight) of the Legion of Honour by the French government for their service in the war. The ceremony was held in Lockett's home town of Bendigo, attended by Prime Minister John Howard, who described Lockett as a "priceless national treasure ... who represents so much of what is the true Australian spirit ... courage ... adventure ... a willingness to share adversity". In 2000, aged 109, Lockett participated in the 2000 Olympic Torch Relay. On 11 June 2001, he was awarded the Medal of the Order of Australia for service to the community of Bendigo, particularly as a representative of Australia war veterans. Lockett died of kidney failure at age 111 years, 123 days, shortly after fellow supercentenarian Christina Cock, the oldest woman and person ever in Australia and Oceania. He was honoured with a state funeral, and described as "a hero of the nation" who "was indeed the quintessential Australian battler. Whatever hand of cards fate dealt him, his response was, 'No worries'."

At the time of his death, Lockett was survived by four children: Jack, Kevin, Joyce and Ron; fifteen grandchildren and twenty-four great-grandchildren. He was Australia's oldest verified male until 2021 when Dexter Kruger set a new national record.

== Honours and awards ==

- Medal of the Order of Australia (awarded 11 June 2001)
- British War Medal
- Victory Medal
- 80th Anniversary Armistice Remembrance Medal (awarded 21 April 1999)
- Centenary Medal (awarded 1 January 2002)
- Chevalier (Knight) of the Legion of Honour (awarded 4 July 1998)
