= Brian O'Halloran (Australian footballer) =

Australian rules footballer (1937–2021)

Personal information
- Full name: Brian Michael O'Halloran
- Born: 29 October 1937
- Died: 20 July 2021 (aged 83)
- Original team: Coburg YCW
- Height: 188 cm (6 ft 2 in)
- Weight: 81 kg (179 lb)

Playing career^{1}
Years	Club	Games (Goals)
1955, 1958	North Melbourne	9 (1)
- ^{1} Playing statistics correct to the end of 1958.

Brian Michael O'Halloran (29 October 1937 – 20 July 2021) was an Australian rules footballer who played with North Melbourne in the Victorian Football League (VFL).
