= John Richard Davey =

Australian cricketer (1957–2021)

Personal information
- Born: 26 August 1957; Bournemouth, England
- Died: 26 March 2021 (aged 63)
- Source: Cricinfo, 24 July 2018

John Richard Davey (26 August 1957 – 26 March 2021) was an Australian cricketer. He played one first-class match for South Australia in 1981/82.

== See also ==
- List of South Australian representative cricketers
