= Carol Rudyard =

Australian artist (1922–2021)

- Born: 18 November 1922; Sheffield, England, U.K.
- Died: 15 May 2021 (aged 98)
- Awards: Festival of Perth Poster Prize (1964); Mundaring Art Prize (1970)

Carol Rudyard (18 November 1922 – 15 May 2021) was an English-Australian visual artist, known for her audio-video art installations. She was nominated as a Western Australian Living Treasure in 2004. Her works are held in the National Gallery of Australia, the Art Gallery of New South Wales, the Art Gallery of Western Australia, the University of Western Australia, WAIT, the Lawrence Wilson Art Gallery as well as private collections.

== Early life ==
Rudyard was born in England in 1922, and was living in Sheffield when she and her husband left in 1947 when he was posted to the Gilbert and Ellice Islands. They moved to Western Australia in 1950, living in the towns of Mullewa and Southern Cross before settling in Perth in 1956.

== Artistic career ==
In the 1950s, Rudyard began designing textiles, and working with watercolours. In 1964 she won the Festival of Perth Poster Prize, and the Mundaring Art Prize in 1970.

She was enrolled in an Associate Diploma in Art at Western Australian Institute of Technology (now Curtin University) from 1968 to 1970, and from 1971 taught classes there. In 1981 she completed a postgraduate diploma in visual art at Curtin, and in 1999 the university made her an honorary Doctor of Letters.

In 1991 Rudyard received a Creative Fellowship from the Australia Council.

The Canberra Times described her Body language video piece in 1992 as "both clever and beautiful which takes the 'Unicorn tapestry' as a text, a phallocentric discourse on bondage and humiliation, which she examines from a feminist perspective".

Rudyard died in May 2021 at the age of 98.

Rudyard is represented in collections of the Art Gallery of NSW, the Art Gallery of WA, the University of WA, WAIT, as well as private collections.

== Solo exhibitions ==
- Old Fire Station Gallery, Perth, 1973
- WAIT, 1980
- Gallery 52, 1982
- Art Gallery of WA, 1982
- Roslyn Oxley9 Gallery, 1988, 89, 91

== Group exhibitions ==
- Art Gallery of NSW, 1971-1973
- Adelaide Festival of Arts, 1972
- Galerie Dusseldorf, 1981
- Fremantle Arts Centre, 1982
- University of WA, 1984
- Praxis Gallery, 1987
- The Australian Bicentennial Perspecta, Art Gallery of New South Wales, 1988
