= Babette Smith =

Australian historian (1942–2021)

Babette Smith OAM
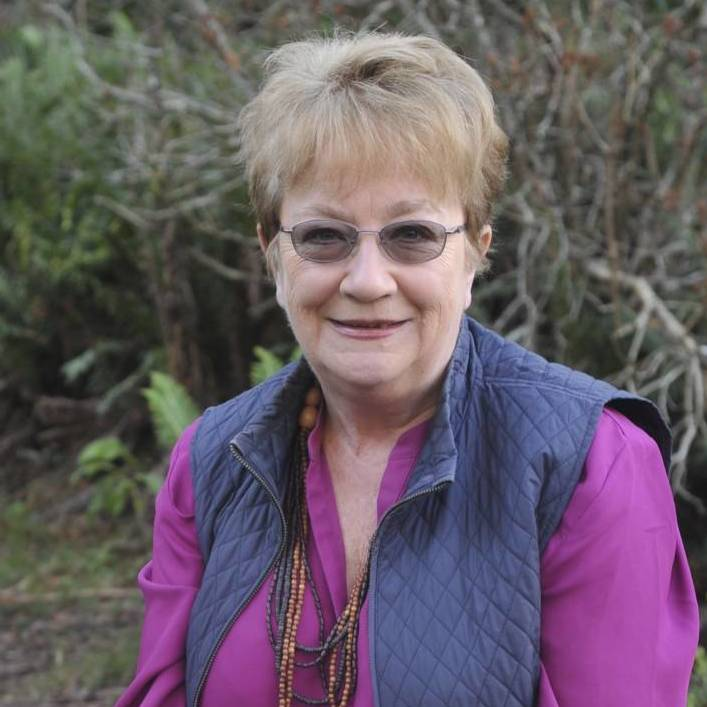
- Babette Smith in 2014
- Born: Babette Alison Macfarlan; 2 April 1942
- Died: 22 November 2021 (aged 79)
- Education: Frensham, Mittagong (1959)
- Alma mater: University of Sydney
- Occupations: Colonial historian, mediator, business executive
- Known for: Convict research, particularly women
- Children: 1
- Awards: NSW Premier's Prize for Regional and Community History, 2015, and Annual History Citation, NSW History Council, 2021.

Babette Alison Smith (2 April 1942 – 22 November 2021) OAM was an Australian colonial historian, mediator and business executive. She wrote books about the convicts transported to Australia.

== Early life ==
Born 2 April 1942, Babette Alison Smith (nee Macfarlan) was the daughter of Bruce Panton Macfarlan and Barbara Macfarlan (nee Scott). Her father Bruce saw active service as a Group Captain in the RAAF during WWII, was a barrister and later was a judge in the Supreme Court of New South Wales. Babette spent her early school years at SCEGGS Redlands, and in 1955 she became a boarder at Frensham, Mittagong. After leaving school, she completed a BA at the University of Sydney while working at the Supreme Court as a judge’s associate to her father.

== Career ==
Entertainment Industry

Babette was a convener of the Opera House Younger Set, a fund-raising group for what was then a vacant site on Bennelong Point. Babette learned the business side of the performing arts through her job with director Stefan Haag at the Elizabethan Theatre Trust. She was Harry M. Miller’s production assistant for Hair, and worked on the sets of three Australian films including Silver City and Year of Living Dangerously. Moving to television, she worked for several years at TCN9, where she became in-house producer of special events. She helped create a women’s talk show and worked on many programs, including what she called “Friday Night goes to the dogs” – the Don Lane variety show that switched almost seamlessly from musical items to greyhound races at Harold Park. Her next big job was marketing manager at Hoyts Cinemas, where she made a point of championing Australian movies.

Australian Historian

After the birth of her son in 1977, Babette took up a family tree that her father had begun: family lore suggested that there was a convict somewhere. Following the maternal line, she found that there was indeed a convict, Susannah Watson. She was lucky enough to discover Susannah’s letters to one of the daughters she was forced to leave behind in England. Convicted for stealing to feed her family, Susannah made the most of life in Australia, which she described as a plentiful country. She lived to old age and her Australian-born son Charles Isaac Watson founded newspapers. Susannah’s letters are now in the Mitchell Library.

Babette's first book, A Cargo of Women, grew from this discovery that her great-great-grandmother, Susannah Watson, was a convict transported to Australia in 1829. A Cargo of Women is an original work, combining Susannah’s story with the lives of 99 other prisoners on the Princess Royal. Scholarship and narrative flair are the hallmarks of Babette Smith’s work. For her, convict women were neither whores nor society’s victims, but individuals doing their best in very tough times. In Australia’s Birthstain she examined the role of homophobia in attitudes to male convicts; in The Luck of the Irish she followed a cohort of male prisoners.

Bar Association, Mediation & Other Roles

Babette was chief executive of the NSW Bar Association from 1993 to 1997, the first woman to do so. She worked as a mediator for Legal Aid, Strata Titles and Farm Debt. She was also an official visitor for Corrective Services NSW, working out of Silverwater and Lithgow jails.

She was a member of the Australian Republican Movement and on its NSW Committee for two years. She was invited to present the 2009 Russel Ward Annual Lecture at the University of New England.

The Mitchell Library at the State Library of New South Wales holds two collections of her papers (25 boxes) covering her research, writing and employment. Jeannine Baker interviewed Smith in 2018, with the recording held by the National Film and Sound Archive.

== Honours & Recognition ==
Smith was awarded the Medal of the Order of Australia in the 2015 Queen's Birthday Honours for "service to the community, particularly as an historian and author". The Luck of the Irish won the 2015 NSW Premier's Prize for Regional and Community history and was shortlisted for the Australian Historical Association’s Kay Daniels award for excellence in research in 2016. Recognising the importance of her career and contributions to Australian colonial history, she was awarded the Annual History Citation by the NSW History Council in 2021 shortly after her death.

== Death ==
Smith died on 22 November 2021 from endometrial cancer. She was survived by her son, Joshua. Following her funeral and cremation, her ashes were scattered up near Palm Beach lighthouse, in the same location as her parents.

== Publications ==
=== Non-fiction ===
- A Cargo of Women: Susannah Watson and the Convicts of the Princess Royal, NSW University Press, 1988, ISBN 978-0-86840-067-9; 2nd ed., Sun Australia, 1992, ISBN 978-0-7251-0635-5; 3rd ed., Rosenberg Publishing, 2005, ISBN 978-1-877058-33-2; 4th ed., Allen & Unwin, 2008, ISBN 978-1-74175-551-0
- Mothers and Sons, Allen & Unwin, 1995, ISBN 978-1-86373-866-8
- Coming Up for Air: The History of the Asthma Foundation of New South Wales, Rosenberg Publishing in association with the Asthma Foundation of New South Wales, 2003, ISBN 978-1-877058-17-2
- Australia's Birthstain: The Startling Legacy of the Convict Era, Allen & Unwin, 2009, ISBN 978-1-74175-675-3
- The Luck of the Irish: How a Shipload of Convicts Survived the Wreck of the Hive to Make a New Life in Australia, Allen & Unwin, 2014, ISBN 978-1-74237-812-1
- Defiant Voices: How Australia's Female Convicts Challenged Authority: 1788–1853, NLA Publishing, 2021, ISBN 978-0-642-27959-0

=== Novel ===
- A Cargo of Women: The Novel, Pan Australia, 1991, ISBN 978-0-330-27222-3; 2nd ed., Pan Macmillan Australia, 2010, ISBN 978-1-4050-3977-2

=== Chapter contribution ===
- "Integrate Not Separate", in Cutting the Cord: Stories of Children, Love and Loss, edited by Debra Adelaide, Random House Australia, 1998, ISBN 978-0-09-183526-2
