= Keith Webb =

Australian rules footballer (1933–2021)

Personal information
- Born: 31 March 1933
- Died: 19 August 2021 (aged 88)
- Original team: Preston District
- Height: 178 cm (5 ft 10 in)
- Weight: 78 kg (172 lb)

Playing career^{1}
Years	Club	Games (Goals)
1953–59, 1961	Fitzroy	47 (26)
- ^{1} Playing statistics correct to the end of 1961.

Keith Webb (31 March 1933 – 19 August 2021) was an Australian rules footballer who played with Fitzroy in the Victorian Football League (VFL).
