= Ken Colvin =

Australian rules footballer (1938–2021)

Personal information
- Full name: Kenneth John Colvin
- Born: 30 November 1938
- Died: 17 November 2021 (aged 82); Echuca
- Original team: Rochester
- Height: 188 cm (6 ft 2 in)
- Weight: 85 kg (187 lb)
- Position: Fullback

Playing career^{1}
Years	Club	Games (Goals)
1962–65	South Melbourne	55 (6)
- ^{1} Playing statistics correct to the end of 1965.

Kenneth John Colvin (30 November 1938 – 17 November 2021) was an Australian rules footballer who played with South Melbourne in the Victorian Football League (VFL).

Colvin died from COVID-19 on 17 November 2021, at the age of 82.
