= Bill Cameron (footballer) =

Australian rules footballer (1928–2021)

Personal information
- Full name: William Charles Cameron
- Born: 5 August 1928
- Died: 22 April 2021 (aged 92)
- Original team: Maffra
- Height: 183 cm (6 ft 0 in)
- Weight: 76 kg (168 lb)
- Position: Ruck / Defence

Playing career^{1}
Years	Club	Games (Goals)
1948–52	St Kilda	61 (2)
- ^{1} Playing statistics correct to the end of 1952.

William Charles Cameron (5 August 1928 – 22 April 2021) was an Australian rules footballer who played with St Kilda in the Victorian Football League (VFL).
