= Douglas Winston =

Australian sprinter (1932–2021)

Douglas Winston (16 December 1932 – 23 May 2021) was an Australian sprinter who competed in the 1956 Summer Olympics.
