= Brian Renwood =

Australian rules footballer (1935–2021)

Personal information
- Full name: Brian Renwood
- Born: 18 August 1935
- Died: 7 November 2021 (aged 86)
- Original team: Abbotsford
- Height: 175 cm (5 ft 9 in)
- Weight: 76 kg (168 lb)

Playing career^{1}
Years	Club	Games (Goals)
1957	Collingwood	3 (0)
- ^{1} Playing statistics correct to the end of 1957.

Brian Renwood (18 August 1935 – 7 November 2021) was an Australian rules footballer who played with Collingwood in the Victorian Football League (VFL).
