= Dexter Kruger =

Australian supercentenarian

- Born: 13 January 1910; Nundah, Queensland, Australia
- Died: 20 July 2021 (aged 111 years, 188 days)
- Occupations: Cattle farmer and veterinarian
- Known for: Oldest Australian man ever (17 May 2021 – 12 April 2025); Oldest living Australian (29 December 2020 – 20 July 2021); Oldest living Australian man (30 April 2017 – 20 July 2021)

Dexter Kruger (13 January 1910 – 20 July 2021) was an Australian supercentenarian and author who was the oldest known living person in Australia until his death. He was also the oldest Australian man ever, until his age was surpassed by Ken Weeks on 12 April 2025.

== Biography ==
=== Early life ===
Kruger was born on 13 January 1910 in Nundah, an inner suburb in the City of Brisbane, Queensland, Australia to Albert Heinrich "Henry" Kruger (1871–1959) and Matilda Otto (1878–1961), both of whom were of German descent from the Königreich Sachsen. He had five siblings and grew up on the family farm in Kilcoy, a small town in Queensland, where he went to school. In 1942, he married Gladys Beanland (1908–1994), with whom he had one son, Greg Kruger.

He began selling cattle at 16 and acquired his own farmland in his twenties. He was a pioneer of the live-weight cattle selling system; in 1951, as a member of the United Graziers Association, an Australian Trade union Association, he was able to pass a motion to have live-weight scales installed in Cannon Hill, Queensland.

=== Later life ===
His wife died in 1994, at the age of 86 after half a century of marriage. Following his wife's death, Kruger started writing books, writing more than 300 stories in 12 separate books, plus his autobiography, The Life and Times of Dexter Kruger, published on 17 May 2021.

Kruger lived independently on his own until the age of 103, when he moved into a care home in Roma, Queensland, Australia. Kruger was taken for a ride on a Harley Davidson motorcycle at the age of 106 and in December 2018, a month before his 109th birthday, he was visited by Queensland Senator, Amanda Stoker and Member of the Queensland Legislative Assembly Ann Leahy.

=== Media Appearances ===
In 2012, Kruger was featured in a documentary called "The 100+ Club", broadcast on Australian television. The documentary, followed the lives of Kruger and two other centenarians, Ruth Frith (1909–2014), and Olive Webber, who "lived active lives". Kruger remained active in the media, being interviewed in 2013, for the podcast 100 Not Out, in which he talked about his life, detailed his dietary habits, and read some of his own poetry. In 2017, he was interviewed as part of the ABC's You Can't Ask That series. When asked about sex, Kruger said "I've only had one girl in my life. I think one is enough. One is enough at a time, anyway." He considered the telephone the most significant invention of his lifetime, describing it as "like magic".

=== Death ===
Dexter Kruger died at his retirement home in Roma, on 20 July 2021 after a brief illness, aged 111 years and 188 days. In August 2021, he was posthumously featured in a documentary called The 110+ Club, broadcast as part of ABC Religion & Ethics.

== Health and longevity ==
=== Health and diet ===
When he surpassed the final age of Jack Lockett, on 17 May 2021, he was asked by the then Defence Minister, Peter Dutton about his secret to his longevity to which he responded, "Find something you like to do, and do it well, I set myself a goal when I was quite young, and I achieved that." Kruger also attributed his longevity to a remote lifestyle, his writing and diet, mentioning in interviews that he enjoyed eating prawns and chicken brains, which he described as "delicious little things".

=== Longevity ===
Kruger became the oldest living Australian man on 30 April 2017, following the death of 108-year-old Alfred Powell and the oldest living Australian on 30 December 2020, following the death of 111-year-old Mabel Crosby.

On 17 May 2021, he surpassed the 21-year-long record of Jack Lockett and became the oldest man ever from Australia.

== See also ==
- List of the oldest people by country
- Oldest people
- Ageing of Australia
- List of Australian states by life expectancy
