= Peter Kanis =

Australian rules footballer (1931–2021)

Personal information
- Full name: Peter Nicholas Kanis
- Born: 13 April 1931
- Died: 25 November 2021 (aged 90)
- Original team: Melbourne High
- Height: 175 cm (5 ft 9 in)
- Weight: 76 kg (168 lb)

Playing career^{1}
Years	Club	Games (Goals)
1952–56	Hawthorn (VFL)	41 (11)
1959–60	Norwood (SAFL)	6 (0)
Total		47 (11)
- ^{1} Playing statistics correct to the end of 1960.

Peter Nicholas Kanis (13 April 1931 – 25 November 2021) was an Australian rules footballer who played with Hawthorn in the Victorian Football League (VFL) and Norwood in the South Australian National Football League (SANFL).

== Family ==
The son of Constantine Kanis (1898-1983), and Asimina Kanis (1902-1968), née Amonis, Peter Kanis was born on 13 April 1931.

== Education ==
He attended Melbourne High School, and was the captain of the school's First XVIII.

== Hawthorn (VFL) ==
The VFL established a competition known as the Victorian Junior Football League in 1919; it was renamed "the Seconds" in 1924 (i.e., the clubs' Second XVIIIs), and "the Reserves" in 1960. In between 1946 and 1959 the VFL conducted a "Thirds" competition (i.e., the clubs' Third XVIIIs), it was renamed "the Under-19s" in 1960. One of the important advantages of a "Thirds" team was seen to be that it "enable[d] players to move from team to team without the necessity of obtaining a clearance to rise from Third to Second Eighteen or vice versa".

Although some sources indicate that Kanis came to Hawthorn via the Melbourne High School Old Boys Football Club (MHSOB) in the Victorian Amateur Football Association (VAFA), others indicate, more strongly, that he had risen through the Hawthorn system from playing with the "Thirds", to playing with the "Seconds". and, as well the fact that he was listed, by the MHSOB, as one of the "former AFL/VFL players who started their football at MHS and/or MHSOBFC", suggests that the "or" applies in his case, and that he was recruited while still a student at Melbourne High School.

In his last match for the Hawthorn club he was the captain of the team that played in the 1956 (Seconds') first semi-final, against Richmond, at the MCG on 25 August 1956 — the Hawthorn Club's first-ever appearance in a VFL final in any grade — and, although Hawthorn lost the match, 5.9 (39) to 9.12 (66), Kanis was one of the Hawthorn Seconds' best players.
