= Ron Rhodes =

Australian rules footballer (1932–2021)

Personal information
- Full name: Ronald Thomas Rhodes
- Born: 17 November 1932
- Died: 24 May 2021 (aged 88)
- Original team: Princes Hill
- Height: 183 cm (6 ft 0 in)
- Weight: 85.5 kg (188 lb)

Playing career^{1}
Years	Club	Games (Goals)
1954	Carlton	1 (0)
- ^{1} Playing statistics correct to the end of 1954.

Ronald Thomas Rhodes (17 November 1932 – 24 May 2021) was an Australian rules footballer who played with Carlton in the Victorian Football League (VFL).
