= Alf Callick (footballer, born 1925) =

Australian footballer (1925–2021)

Personal information
- Full name: Alfred Joseph Callick
- Born: 14 August 1925; South Melbourne, Victoria, Australia
- Died: 3 January 2021 (aged 95)
- Original team: South Melbourne Colts
- Height: 180 cm (5 ft 11 in)
- Weight: 76 kg (168 lb)

Playing career^{1}
Years	Club	Games (Goals)
1943–1950	South Melbourne	57 (9)
- ^{1} Playing statistics correct to the end of 1950.

Alfred Joseph Callick (14 August 1925 – 3 January 2021) was an Australian rules footballer who played with South Melbourne in the Victorian Football League (VFL).

Callick, a South Melbourne Colts player, was used by South Melbourne as a ruckman and defender. He made his debut in South Melbourne's win over Footscray at Princes Park in the 1943 VFL season, then didn't reappear until 1946, due to war service.

After leaving South Melbourne, Callick played for Traralgon and was club coach for the 1954 Latrobe Valley Football League season.
