= Kevin Hevey =

Australian rules footballer (1923–2021)

Personal information
- Full name: James Kevin Hevey
- Born: 30 April 1923; Malvern, Victoria
- Died: 16 October 2021 (aged 98); Montrose, Victoria
- Original team: Tooronga Football Club
- Height: 180 cm (5 ft 11 in)
- Weight: 80 kg (176 lb)

Playing career^{1}
Years	Club	Games (Goals)
1946–47	Hawthorn	5 (0)
- ^{1} Playing statistics correct to the end of 1947.

James Kevin Hevey (30 April 1923 – 16 October 2021) was an Australian rules footballer who played with Hawthorn in the Victorian Football League (VFL).

== Family ==
The son of Augustine Lawrence Michael Hevey (1884-1970), and Margaret Jean Hevey (1885-1984), née Sinclair, James Kevin Hevey was born at Malvern, Victoria on 5 April 1923.

He married Joyce Isabelle Reid (1928-2011) in 1950.

== Football ==
=== Hawthorn (VFL) ===
Recruited from the Tooronga Football Club in 1941, he began his career at Hawthorn playing in the Second XVIII.

He returned to Hawthorn after his military service.

=== Camberwell (VFA) ===
In 1949, along with his Hawthorn team-mate Bob Milgate, Hevey transferred to Camberwell in the VFA.

== Military service ==
Hevey served as a member of the 24th Battalion (Australia) in World War II.

== Death ==
Hevey died at Montrose, Victoria on 16 October 2021, at the age of 98. At the time of his death, Hevey was noted as being the oldest former Hawthorn player.

== Bibliography ==
- Cullen, Barbara (2015). Harder than Football: League Players at War. Richmond, Victoria: Slattery Media Group.
- Haby, Peter (2013), "Old Hawthorn families visit Museum", hawthornfc.com.au, 1 May 2013.
- Haby, Peter (2021), "The Club loses its Oldest Hawk", hawthornfc.com.au, 22 October 2021.
- Holmesby, Russell; Main, Jim (2014). The Encyclopedia of AFL Footballers: every AFL/VFL player since 1897 (10th ed.). Seaford, Victoria: BAS Publishing. ISBN 978-1-921496-32-5.
- World War Two Nominal Roll: Private James Kevin Hevey (VX143539), Department of Veterans' Affairs.
- B883, VX143539: World War Two Service Record: Private James Kevin Hevey (VX143539), National Archives of Australia.
