= Neville Meaney =

Australian historian (1932–2021)

Neville Meaney (2 July 1932, Adelaide – 30 May 2021) was a noted historian of Australia, considered among the "foremost thinkers in the field of foreign and defence policy history" with a special focus on the early twentieth century and questions of Australia's cultural and geopolitical place in the world.

== Biography ==
Born in Adelaide, Neville Meaney was the first Australian historian to be awarded an American PhD, at Duke University. Returning to Australia in 1959, he taught first at UNSW before moving to the University of Sydney in 1962, remaining there for the rest of his career. His monograph Australia and the World (1985) is considered a "comprehensive documentary history of Australia’s relations with the world of nations." Later works continued to consider Australia's place in the world, including as regarded the rising importance of Asia.

Meaney gave the 2009 A.R. Davis Memorial Lecture on "The problem of nationalism and race: Australia and Japan in World War I and World War II".

A festschrift in his honour was published in 2013, recognising (in the words of Dennis Richardson (diplomat)) his "major contribution...to the development and evolution of Australian and American foreign relations history in this country [Australia]."
