= Hartley Joynt =

Australian cricketer (1938–2021)

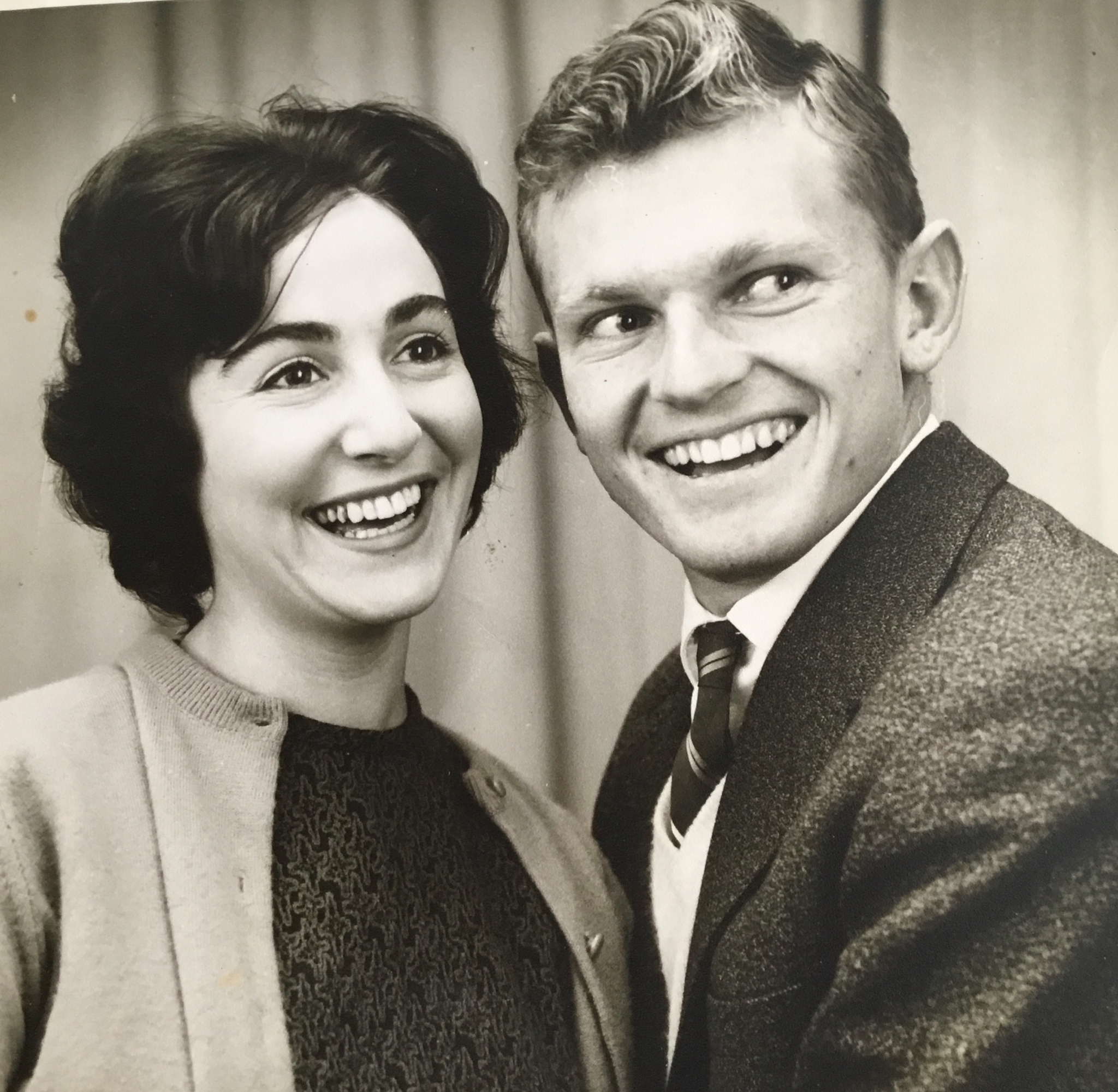

Personal information
- Born: 14 June 1938; Perth, Western Australia
- Died: 12 May 2021 (aged 82)
- Batting: Right-handed
- Bowling: Legbreak
- Source: CricInfo, 12 May 2021

Hartley Kelly Joynt (14 June 1938 – 12 May 2021) was an Australian cricketer. He played seventeen first-class matches for Western Australia between 1960/61 and 1964/65, scoring 48 on debut in Western Australia's victory over the touring West Indians. His highest score was 81 for a Western Australia Combined XI against the South Africans in 1963/64.

Joynt later became a journalist with The West Australian.
