= Anthony Adams (optometrist) =

Australian-American optometrist (1940–2021)

- Born: October 12, 1940
- Died: July 16, 2021 (aged 80)
- Education: University of Melbourne; Indiana University Bloomington
- Occupation: Optometrist
- Website: Anthony J. Adams

Anthony J. Adams (October 12, 1940 – July 16, 2021) was an Australian-American optometrist. He was an emeritus professor of optometry and vision science at the UC Berkeley School of Optometry, where he also served as dean from 1992 to 2001.

== Education and career ==
Adams spent his childhood in Kew, Victoria and obtained a bachelor's degree from the University of Melbourne in December 1962. In the same year, he got a license in optometry from the Victorian College of Optometry. In 1963, he got an invitation to move to Indiana University Bloomington to obtain a Ph.D. under the supervision of Gordon Heath.

In 1967, he joined the faculty of the UC Berkeley School of Optometry as an assistant professor. Adams was editor-in-chief for Optometry and Vision Science.

== Death ==
Adams died on 16 July 2021.
