= Jun Hong Lu =

Chinese-Australian religious leader (1959–2021)

- 卢军宏
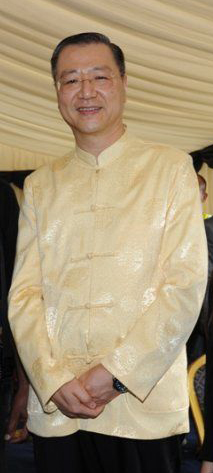
- Lu in 2012
- Born: 4 August 1959; Shanghai, China
- Died: 10 November 2021 (aged 62); Sydney, Australia
- Education: Shanghai Theatre Academy; UNSW Business School
- Occupations: Australia Oriental Radio director; Guan Yin Citta Dharma Door organizations owner
- Known for: Founding of Guan Yin Citta Dharma Door

Chinese name
- Traditional Chinese: 盧軍宏
- Simplified Chinese: 卢军宏
Transcriptions
Standard Mandarin
- Hanyu Pinyin: Lú Jūnhóng
- Website: richardjunhonglu.org

Richard Jun Hong Lu (Chinese: 盧軍宏; pinyin: Lú Jūnhóng, 4 August 1959 – 10 November 2021), also known as Lu Tai Zhang (盧台長, lit. Master Lu) by his followers, was a Chinese-born Australian Buddhist faith healer and the founder of the Guan Yin Citta Dharma Door religious movement (觀世音菩薩心靈法門). During his lifetime, the Guan Yin Citta Dharma Door garnered praise from regular and new Buddhist followers, but also drew controversy among some Buddhist organisations.

Lu was born in Shanghai, China in 1959, and later moved to Australia and studied at UNSW Business School at the University of New South Wales (UNSW) from 1989 to 1995. He became a citizen of Australia later.

Lu was the founder of the Guan Yin Citta Dharma Door religious movement with over 10 million people following his teachings with the spirit and compassion of Mahayana Buddhism. He is also well known internationally for his work in promoting Chinese traditional culture, world peace and helping people through Buddhist Teachings. Many governments and international organizations gave him a lot awards. For example, “British Community Honours Award” at UK Parliament House in 2012, “ICD Award for Exceptional Contribution and Peace Advocacy to the Global Community” presented by the Institute for Cultural Diplomacy (ICD) in 2013, “World Peace Ambassador” at a global summit on world peace held in the US Congress in 2014, "Honorary Visiting Professorship" by the prestigious University of Siena in Italy in 2014, “International Ambassador for Religious Peace” and “Outstanding International Ambassador for Philanthropy” by House of Lords, UK in 2018. He was also conferred Datuk (a lifelong honor title) by Malaysia.

== Early life ==
Lu was born on 4 August 1959 in Shanghai, China in a family of Buddhist. In his youth he studied traditional Chinese opera and graduated from Shanghai Theatre Academy; he then studied at UNSW Business School in Australia between 1989 and 1995. During this period, Lu launched a Magazine called "Buddha Fate" (佛缘) and worked as Chief Editor to promote learning of Buddhism theory and knowledge.

After graduation from UNSW Business School, Lu obtained the Australian citizenship in 1995.

In 2007, he started Australia Oriental Radio and served as the chairman and the Chief Radio Broadcaster. He broadcast Buddhism Teaching and answered audiences' questions on radio. Before that, he had some experience working as a broadcaster on radio.

The Guan Yin Citta Dharma Door was formed around 2006 when he broadcast Buddhism on radio.

== As a Guan Yin Citta Dharma Door leader ==
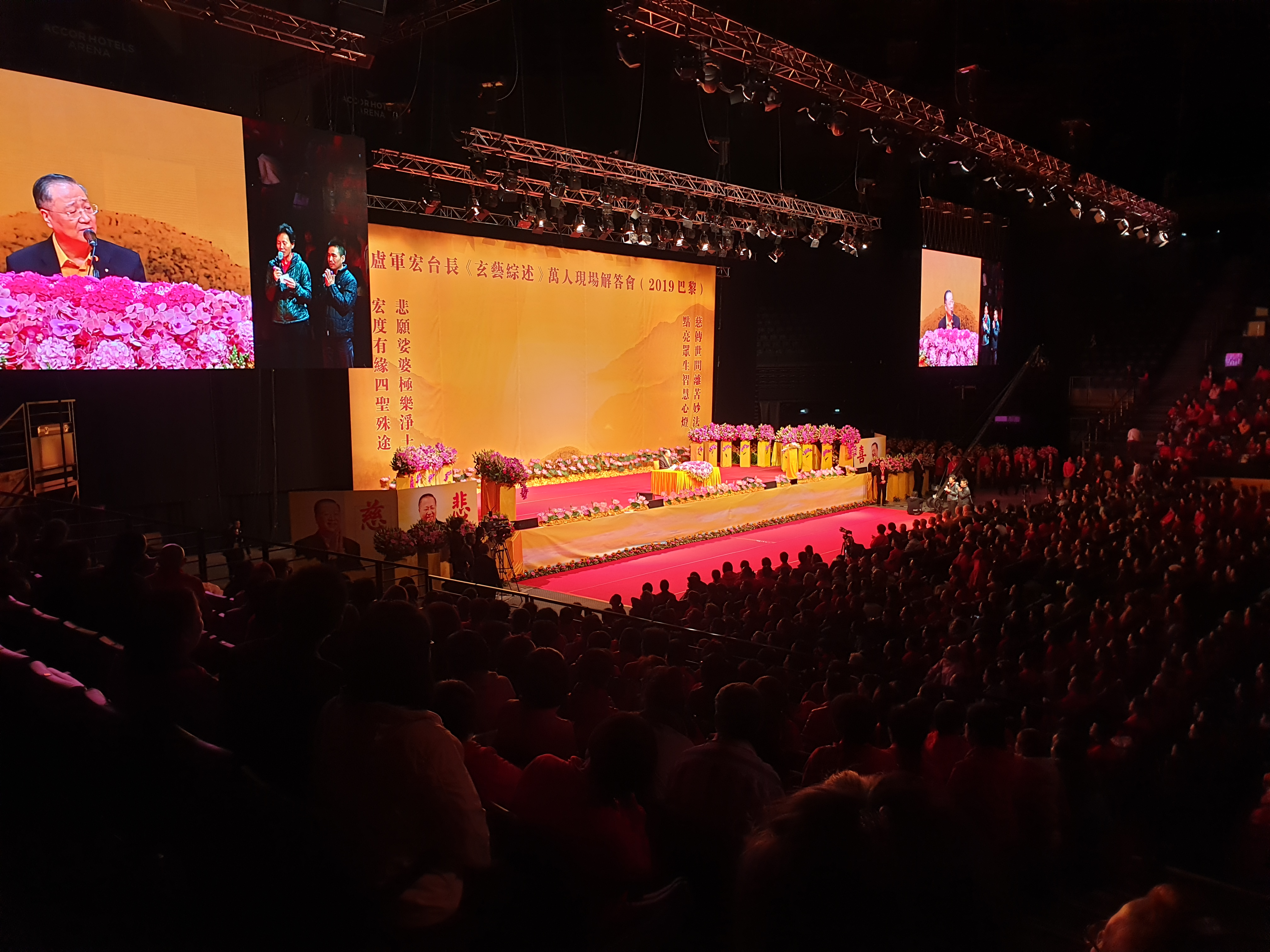
Jun Hong Lu giving a conference at AccorHotels Arena at Paris in 2019

=== Founding of Guan Yin Citta Dharma Door ===
Since the creation of Guan Yin Citta Dharma Door in 2006, the group of audience grows fast. Lu also had lecture tours around the world every year since 2009，to promote Buddhism Teaching and Chinese traditional culture.

He and his team have organized public lecture tours in more than 30 countries and regions with more than 200 lectures. For example, Sydney in Australia; New York, Los Angeles, San Francisco and Boston in the United States; Toronto and Vancouver in Canada; Brussels in Belgium; Madrid in Spain; and Rome in Italy. Lu also delivered speeches in Singapore, Malaysia, Hong Kong, UK, France, Germany, Denmark, Thailand, New Zealand, and Taiwan. The Dharma Convention held by Guan Yin Citta Dharma Door allows visitors to enter for free, and the Buddhism books are sent out for free. The discipleship initiation ceremony is conducted for free. The speeches are in Mandarin, but there are simultaneous translation for people who cannot understand Mandarin.

Lu was also invited to give speeches at United Nations, other international organizations and universities. For example,

In Dec. 2013, invited to give a speech at Institute for Cultural Diplomacy (ICD).

In Sep. 2015, attended the "High Level Forum on the Culture of Peace" held at the United Nations headquarters, at the invitation of the President of the United Nations General Assembly.

In May 2017, invited to give a keynote speech at the United Nations Day of Vesak Commemoration at the UNESCO Headquarters in Paris.

in Sep. 2017, invited to give a keynote speech on the culture of peace at the Italian Parliament.

Now there are over 10 million people following Lu's teaching. And his followers have set up some local offices to continue propagation of Guan Yin Citta Dharma Door and Chinese traditional culture.

== Views ==
=== Mahayana Buddhism ===
Lu claimed that the Guan Yin Citta Dharma Door was an orthodox Mahayana Buddhist practice, regularly encouraging his believers to recite the Buddhist scriptures (sutras and mantras) based on Guan Yin on a daily basis, practice life liberation (saving the lives of beings destined for slaughter), and making great vows to help more people. While these practices are already upheld in mainstream Buddhism as part of daily practice, Lu claimed that these three "golden practices" also laid a solid foundation for improved physical health, as well as mental and psychological well-being. Many of his followers have testified publicly at his seminars claiming to have been healed through Lu's Guan Yin Citta practice.

=== Guan Yin Citta Dharma Door practices ===
Lu created the following three core practices for the Guan Yin Citta Dharma Door:

1. Reciting Buddhist Sutras/mantras: Lu teaches that reciting Buddhist sutras and mantras on a daily basis helps one benefit from the blessings of the Buddhas and Bodhisattvas and recitation will not only help eliminate one's negative karma, it will also bring strength, wisdom, and inner peace, so that one can overcome all kinds of obstacles. The three major sutras and mantras recited by Guan Yin Citta followers are: the Great Compassion Mantra, the Heart Sutra, and the Eighty-eight Buddhas Repentance. A few optional sutras and mantras are the Cundi Dharani, Mantra to Untie Karmic Knots and Amitabha Pure Land Rebirth Mantra.
2. Practicing life liberation: Release of animals especially those likely to be killed, is a popular practice performed by all schools of Buddhism. Lu made his Guan Yin Citta believes that setting animals free helps one cultivate compassion towards all beings, and deepens the understanding that all living beings are all interdependent.
3. Making great vows: When one makes a vow, they will be motivated to fulfill the vow. The vow then becomes very strong energy; it can overcome countless obstacles. It also claimed that it's true when one makes a vow out of compassion. Seeing the suffering and hearing the cries of sentient beings, the Bodhisattva brings forth immense compassion and vows to benefit all sentient beings.

=== Organization ===
On Jun Hong Lu's official Chinese-language blog, he emphasised the importance of Guan Yin Citta followers abiding by the rules and regulations in their respective countries and regions when practising Guan Yin Citta Dharma Door. The main principle of Guan Yin Citta is to love respective country and people, abide by the laws of the country, in achieving a harmonious society. The secretariat further state that, "The Guan Yin Citta practitioner must cultivate compassion for other people, must love respective country and the people, must protect respective country and cultivate harmony in the society; these are the basics of the Guan Yin Citta Buddhist practice, be a pillar of strength for society and respective country."

=== Religions ===
In an interview with Radio France Internationale, Lu stated that: "The reason of having 84,000 Dharma is to accommodate all beings and creatures to understand One's self in order to create a soulful world. It will be good enough as long as you have the heart and soul to create a better place for all beings. That is why I respect the Dharma. It doesn't matter which Dharma you choose; it will still be the path that you have to proceed. This is a very important point. Therefore, Chinese in Sydney will practice vegetarian during the first and the fifteenth of the Chinese calendar. There are also a lot of Chinese worshiping the Buddha during festive seasons. Some even know how to practice loving kindness. A few organisations in Sydney such as the Tzu Chi Foundation, Pure Land Buddhism by Chin Kung and also Hsing Yun's Nan Tien temple are all well established with the same priority, and that is to carry forward the Buddhism Teaching in order to unite everyone physically, mentally and soulfully. Hence, I believe that every Buddhist Chinese from all over the world should continue to practice Buddhism as it will benefit in the cultivation of One's mindset, and also to create a peaceful and harmonious world."

== Death ==
Lu died on 10 November 2021 at the age of 62, due to undisclosed illnesses.

== Publications ==
Lu authored the following books:

- Buddhism in Plain Terms Vols. 1–12
- Words of Wisdom Vols. 1–9
- The Proverbs
- Buddhism: Your Questions Answered
- Insightful Wisdom-Proverbs from Master Lu
- On Modern Concept Of Psychology
- Metaphysics Q&A Vols. 1–3

== Honours and awards ==
On 31 March 2014, Lu was awarded honorary visiting professor by the University of Siena, Italy. The visiting professorship is under the Master Program in Global Governance and Cultural Diplomacy of the University of Siena.

In September 2015, Lu was invited to attend the United Nations High-Level Forum on the Culture of Peace as a panelist. The forum features Arun Manilal Gandhi, the fifth grandson of Mahatma Gandhi, as a keynote speaker.

In March 2017, Lu was invited to meet with Sri Lanka's President Maithripala Sirisena.

Lu was invited to attend the International Vesak Day Festival at UNESCO as a keynote speaker in both 2018 and 2019.

== Controversy ==
=== Malaysia Buddhism organisation's reaction ===
On 23 January 2015, one day before Lu's Guan Yin Citta Dharma Door event started at Penang in Malaysia, sixteen Buddhist organisations from Malaysia made a joint declaration to warn the public that the Guan Yin Citta Dharma Door preached by Lu was not, in their view, orthodox Buddhist teaching and urged the public to avoid attending Lu's event on 24 January 2015. In the declaration, the organisations also condemned Lu for abusing Buddhist mantras and use the illusion of supernatural power to mislead other Buddhists.

On 28 December 2018, nine Buddhist organisations from Malaysia jointly issued a public statement, declaring that Lu's Guan Yin Citta belief was not orthodox Buddhist teaching, and cautioned the public to avoid attending Lu's religious events. The nine organisations were Malaysian Buddhist Association, Young Buddhist Association Of Malaysia / YBAM ATC, Buddhist Missionary Society Malaysia, Buddhist Maha Vihara Malaysia, Theravada Buddhist Council of Malaysia, Vajrayana Buddhist Council of Malaysia, Buddha's Light International Association in Malaysia, and Malaysian Buddhist Kulapati Association. In the joint declaration, the organisations point that Lu's claim to his ability to conduct totem and tarot reading, to foresee a person's previous and future lives, and being able to directly communicate with Guan Yin Bodhisattva did not fall in line with mainstream Buddhist ideology. Additionally, the joint statement also declared that practice of tracking mantra counts using "little house" and burning it, plus the actions of promoting a cult of personality for Lu are also not part of Buddhist practice.

=== The Hong Kong Buddhist Association's reaction ===
On 30 June 2016, the Hong Kong Buddhist Association published a statement on its official website revealing that Guan Yin Citta Dharma Door does not fall in line with orthodox Buddhist doctrines, adding that the movement did not accurately cite or contradicted sutra texts to quantify their claims, and that the Guan Yin Citta Dharma Door added many of Lu's own interpretations to the sutra texts that had not existed before. The association also declared their stance is in line with Buddhist associations from Malaysia and China, who also discredited Guan Yin Citta.

Both Guan Yin Citta Dharma Door's headquarters in Australia and its overseas branches issued statements at various times refuting these allegations.

== See also ==
- Guan Yin
- Chinese Buddhism
