= 2021 in ice hockey =

The following were the events of ice hockey for the year 2021 throughout the world. In 2021, some hockey events were shortened, postponed, or canceled due to the COVID-19 pandemic.

== World Championships ==
- Note: Due to the cancellation of all tournaments below the top division, no relegations occurred.
- April 26 – May 6: 2021 IIHF World U18 Championships in Frisco, United States
  - Canada defeated Russia, 5–3, to win their fourth World U18 Championship title.
  - Sweden defeated Finland, 8–0, to win the bronze medal.
- January 5 – 12: 2021 IIHF World Women's U18 Championship in Linköping and Mjölby, Sweden (Note: Canceled due to the COVID-19 pandemic)
- May 21 – June 6: 2021 IIHF World Championship in Riga, Latvia
  - Canada defeated Finland, 3–2 in overtime, to win their 27th World Championship title.
  - The United States defeated Germany, 6–1, to win the bronze medal.
- December 25, 2020 – January 5, 2021: 2021 IIHF World Junior Championship in Edmonton and Red Deer, Canada
  - The United States defeated Canada, 2–0, to win their fifth World Junior Ice Hockey Championship title.
  - Finland defeated Russia, 4–1, to win the bronze medal
- August 20 – 31: 2021 IIHF Women's World Championship in Calgary, Canada
  - Canada defeated the United States, 3–2 in overtime, to win their 11th Women's World Championship title.
  - Finland defeated Switzerland, 3–1, to win the bronze medal.

== Divisions ==
- All divisional tournaments aside from the top championship division were canceled due to the COVID-19 pandemic

2021 IIHF Ice Hockey World Championships

- March 3 – 5: Division IV in Bishkek, Kyrgyzstan
- April 10 – 16: Division II – Group A in Ljubljana, Slovenia
- April 18 – 24: Division II – Group B in Katowice, Poland
- April 18 – 24: Division III – Group A in Beijing, China
- April 19 – 25: Division III – Group B in Reykjavík, Iceland
- May 9 – 15: Division I – Group A in Kockelscheuer, Luxembourg
- April 26 – May 2: Division I – Group B in Cape Town, South Africa

2021 IIHF World U20 Championship (Junior)

- December 13 – 19, 2020: Division I – Group A in Hørsholm, Denmark
- February 10 – 17: Division I – Group B in Tallinn, Estonia
- January 10 – 17: Division III in Mexico City, Mexico
- February 8 – 14: Division II – Group A in Brașov, Romania
- February 8 – 14: Division II – Group B in Belgrade, Serbia

2021 IIHF World U18 Championships

- March 29 – April 4: Division III – Group A in Istanbul, Turkey
- March 28 – April 3: Division III – Group B in Kockelscheuer, Luxembourg
- April 4 – 10: Division II – Group A in Tallinn, Estonia
- March 21 – 27: Division II – Group B in Sofia, Bulgaria
- April 5 – April 11: Division I – Group A in Spišská Nová Ves, Slovakia
- April 18 – April 25: Division I – Group B in Asiago, Italy

2021 Women's Ice Hockey World Championships

- March 15 – 21: Division III in Kaunas, Lithuania
- April 10 – 16: Division II – Group A in Jaca, Spain
- March 7 – 13: Division II – Group B in Zagreb, Croatia
- April 11 – 18: Division I – Group A in Angers, France
- April 8 – 14: Division I – Group B in Beijing, China

2021 IIHF World Women's U18 Championship

- January 10 – 16: Division I – Group A in Győr, Hungary
- January 10 – 16: Division I – Group B in Radenthein, Austria
- January 19 – 22: Division II – Group A in Dumfries, Scotland
- January 28 – 31: Division II – Group B in İzmit, Turkey

== National Hockey League (NHL) ==
- January 13 – May 16: 2020–21 NHL season
  - The season was shortened and divisions were realigned due to the COVID-19 pandemic. The All-Star Game (hosted by the Florida Panthers) and the Stadium Series (hosted by the Carolina Hurricanes) were postponed to 2023, while the Winter Classic (hosted by the Minnesota Wild) was postponed to 2022.
  - Presidents' Trophy and West Division regular-season winners: Colorado Avalanche
  - Central Division winners: Carolina Hurricanes
  - East Division winners: Pittsburgh Penguins
  - North Division winners: Toronto Maple Leafs
  - Art Ross Trophy winner: Connor McDavid (Edmonton Oilers)
- February 20 and 21: NHL Outdoors at Lake Tahoe at the Edgewood Tahoe Resort in Lake Tahoe
  - February 20: The Colorado Avalanche defeated the Vegas Golden Knights 3–2
  - February 21: The Boston Bruins defeated the Philadelphia Flyers 7–3
- May 15 – July 7: 2021 Stanley Cup playoffs
  - July 7: The Tampa Bay Lightning defeated the Montreal Canadiens four games to one in the Stanley Cup Final to win their second consecutive and third overall Stanley Cup.
- July 23 – 24: 2021 NHL entry draft held via video conference call in Secaucus
  - #1: Owen Power (to the Buffalo Sabres from the Michigan Wolverines)

== Kontinental Hockey League (KHL) ==
- September 2, 2020 – February 27: 2020–21 KHL season
  - Continental Cup winner: CSKA Moscow
- March 2 – April 28: 2021 Gagarin Cup playoffs
  - April 28: Avangard Omsk defeated CSKA Moscow four games to two in the Gagarin Cup playoffs to win their first Gagarin Cup.

== North America ==
=== United States (AHL/ECHL) ===
- February 5 – May 20: 2020–21 AHL season
  - Note: season shortened and no playoffs due to COVID-19 pandemic
  - Macgregor Kilpatrick Trophy & North Division winners: Hershey Bears
  - Atlantic Division winners: Providence Bruins
  - Canadian Division winners: Laval Rocket
  - Central Division winners: Chicago Wolves
  - Pacific Division winners: Henderson Silver Knights
- December 11, 2020 – June 6: 2020–21 ECHL season
  - Note: season shortened due to COVID-19 pandemic
  - Brabham Cup & Eastern Conference winners: Florida Everblades
  - Western Conference winners: Allen Americans
  - June 7 – July 2: 2021 Kelly Cup playoffs
    - July 2: The Fort Wayne Komets defeated the South Carolina Stingrays three games to one to win their first Kelly Cup title.

=== Junior (OHL/QMJHL/USHL/WHL) ===
- November 20, 2020 – April 24: 2020–21 USHL season
  - Anderson Cup & Eastern Conference winners: Chicago Steel
  - Western Conference winners: Tri-City Storm
  - April 25 – May 21: 2021 Clark Cup playoffs
    - The Chicago Steel defeat the Fargo Force three games to one to win their third Clark Cup title.
- October 1, 2021 – April 17: 2020–21 WHL season
  - Scotty Munro Memorial Trophy & Central Division winners: Edmonton Oil Kings
  - East Division winners: Brandon Wheat Kings
  - U.S. Division winners: Everett Silvertips
  - B.C. Division winners: Kamloops Blazers
  - Note: playoffs were canceled due to the COVID-19 pandemic
- October 1, 2020 – April 18: 2020–21 QMJHL season
  - Jean Rougeau Trophy & Maritimes Division winners: Charlottetown Islanders
  - East Division: Chicoutimi Saguenéens
  - West Division: Val-d'Or Foreurs
  - April 23 – June 5: 2021 President's Cup playoffs
    - June 5: The Victoriaville Tigres defeat the Val-d'Or Foreurs four games to two to win their second President's Cup title.
- 2020–21 OHL season
- No Memorial Cup playoffs were played due to the COVID-19 pandemic

=== College (USA–NCAA–Division I) ===
- March 10 – 20: 2021 NCAA National Collegiate women's ice hockey tournament (Frozen Four at Erie Insurance Arena in Erie)
  - The Wisconsin Badgers defeat the Northeastern Huskies, 2–1 in overtime, to win their sixth NCAA Division I Women's Ice Hockey title.
- March 26 – April 10: 2021 NCAA Division I men's ice hockey tournament (Frozen Four at PPG Paints Arena in Pittsburgh)
  - The UMass Minutemen defeat the St. Cloud State Huskies, 5–0, to win their first NCAA Division I Men's Ice Hockey title.

=== College (Canada–U Sports) ===
- 2021 U Sports University Cup Tournament at Eastlink Centre in Charlottetown

=== Women (NWHL) ===
- January 23 – February 1: 2020–21 NWHL season
  - March 25 – March 28: 2021 NWHL playoffs
    - The Boston Pride defeat the Minnesota Whitecaps, 4–3, to win their second Isobel Cup title.

== Europe ==
- 2020–21 Champions Hockey League
- October 1, 2020 – March 22: 2020–21 National League season
  - April 7 – May 7: 2021 National League playoffs
    - EV Zug defeats Genève-Servette HC in a three-game sweep to win their second National League title.
- September 17, 2020 – March 7: 2020–21 Czech Extraliga season
  - Presidential Cup winner: Sparta Praha
  - March 10 – April 26: 2021 Czech Extraliga playoffs
    - Oceláři Třinec defeats Bílí Tygři Liberec, four games to one, to win their fourth Extraliga title.
- October 1, 2020 – April 13: 2020–21 SM-liiga season
  - April 15 – May 11: 2021 SM-liiga playoffs
    - Lukko defeats TPS, three games to one, to win their first SM-liiga title and second Finnish championship.
- December 17, 2020 – April 18: 2020–21 DEL season
  - April 20 – May 7: 2021 DEL playoffs
    - Eisbären Berlin defeats Grizzlys Wolfsburg, two games to one, to win their eighth DEL title.
- September 19, 2020 – April 3: 2020–21 SHL season
  - April 5 – May 10: 2021 SHL playoffs
    - The Växjö Lakers defeat Rögle BK, four games to one, to win their third Le Mat Trophy title.
- October 16, 2020 – January 10: 2020–21 IIHF Continental Cup

== Asia ==
- 2020–21 Asia League Ice Hockey season
- IIHF U20 Asia and Oceania Championship

== Deaths ==
=== January ===
- Rob Flockhart, 64, Canadian ice hockey player (Vancouver Canucks, Minnesota North Stars).
- John Muckler, 86, Canadian ice hockey coach (Minnesota North Stars, Edmonton Oilers, Buffalo Sabres) and executive.
- Gord Renwick, 85, Canadian ice hockey administrator, president of CAHA (1977–1979) and vice-president of IIHF (1986–1994).
- George Robertson, 93, Canadian ice hockey player (Montreal Canadiens).
- Bruno Ghedina, 77, Italian Olympic ice hockey player (1964).
- George Armstrong, 90, Canadian Hall of Fame ice hockey player (Toronto Maple Leafs), Stanley Cup champion (1962–1964, 1967).
- Gert Blomé, 86, Swedish ice hockey player, Olympic silver medallist (1964).
- Christian Daigle, 42, Canadian ice hockey agent.
- Mihail Popescu, 60, Romanian Olympic ice hockey player (1980).

=== February ===
- Art Jones, 85, Canadian ice hockey player (New Westminster Royals, Portland Buckaroos, Seattle Totems).
- Jake McCoy, 79, American Olympic ice hockey player (1964).
- Ralph Backstrom, 83, Canadian ice hockey player (Montreal Canadiens, Los Angeles Kings), six-time Stanley Cup champion.
- Clayton Pachal, 64, Canadian ice hockey player (Boston Bruins, Colorado Rockies).
- Adam Kopczyński, 72, Polish Olympic ice hockey player (1972).
- Don Dietrich, 59, Canadian ice hockey player (Chicago Blackhawks, New Jersey Devils).
- Jack Vivian, 79, Canadian ice hockey coach (Bowling Green Falcons, Cleveland Crusaders).
- Jocelyn Hardy, 75, Canadian ice hockey player (California Golden Seals, Cleveland Crusaders) and coach (Shawinigan Cataractes).
- Bob Hindmarch, 90, Canadian academic and ice hockey coach (UBC Thunderbirds, national team).
- Glynne Thomas, 85, British ice hockey player (Streatham Redskins, Wembley Lions, national team).
- Gary Inness, 71, Canadian ice hockey player (Washington Capitals, Pittsburgh Penguins, Philadelphia Flyers).
- James Sedin, 90, American ice hockey player, Olympic silver medalist (1952).
- Irving Grundman, 92, Canadian ice hockey general manager (Montreal Canadiens).
- Miloš Novák, 68, Czech ice hockey player, 1971 European U19 bronze medalist.
- Alexander Barinev, 68, Russian ice hockey player (Kristall Saratov, HC Spartak Moscow, VEU Feldkirch).

=== March ===
- Boris Kosarev, 69, Belarusian ice hockey player (Traktor Chelyabinsk, HC Dinamo Minsk) and coach (Khimik-SKA Novopolotsk).
- Walter Gretzky, 82, Canadian ice hockey coach, complications from a hip injury.
- Mark Pavelich, 63, American ice hockey player (New York Rangers), Olympic champion (1980).
- Ray Cullen, 79, Canadian ice hockey player (Minnesota North Stars, Vancouver Canucks, Detroit Red Wings).
- Timur Faizutdinov, 19, Russian ice hockey player (HC Dinamo Saint Petersburg).
- Bob McKnight, 83, Canadian ice hockey player, Olympic silver medallist (1960).
- Swede Knox, 73, Canadian NHL ice hockey linesman.
- Alex Andjelic, 80, Serbian Olympic ice hockey player (1964) and coach, complications from COVID-19.
- Bob Plager, 78, Canadian ice hockey player (St. Louis Blues, New York Rangers), traffic collision.
- Bobby Schmautz, 76, Canadian ice hockey player (Boston Bruins, Vancouver Canucks, Chicago Blackhawks).

=== April ===
- Manfred Buder, 85, German ice hockey player (SG Dynamo Weißwasser).
- Red Gendron, 63, American ice hockey coach (Maine Black Bears, Albany River Rats, Indiana Ice).
- Bob Wheeler, 90, American ice hockey player.
- Johnny Peirson, 95, Canadian ice hockey player (Boston Bruins) and broadcaster.
- Viktor Shuvalov, 97, Russian ice hockey player and footballer (VVS Moscow), Olympic champion (1956).
- Kent Angus, 68, Canadian businessman and uniform supplier to the International Ice Hockey Federation
- Miroslav Fryčer, 61, Czech ice hockey player (HC Vítkovice, Toronto Maple Leafs) and coach (Orli Znojmo).
- Hugh Coflin, 92, Canadian ice hockey player (Chicago Blackhawks).

=== May ===
- Jim Johnson, 78, Canadian ice hockey player (Philadelphia Flyers, Los Angeles Kings, Minnesota Fighting Saints).
- Jean-Luc Phaneuf, 65, Canadian ice hockey player (Toronto Toros, Birmingham Bulls).
- Vladislav Yegin, 32, Russian ice hockey player (Spartak Moscow, Avtomobilist Yekaterinburg).
- Jiří Feureisl, 89, Czech footballer (FC Karlovy Vary) and ice hockey player.
- Gilles Lupien, 67, Canadian ice hockey player (Montreal Canadiens, Pittsburgh Penguins, Hartford Whalers), Stanley Cup champion (1978, 1979).
- Gordon McMillan, 94, Canadian ice hockey player (Michigan Wolverines).
- Marek Trončinský, 32, Czech ice hockey player (Progym Gheorgheni, Bílí Tygři Liberec, Sheffield Steelers).
- Murray Dowey, 95, Canadian ice hockey player, Olympic champion (1948).
- Markus Egen, 93, German Olympic ice hockey player (1952, 1956, 1960).
- Abner Oakes, 87, Canadian-born American ice hockey player (Dartmouth) and coach.

=== June ===
- Dave Reid, 87, Canadian ice hockey player (Toronto Maple Leafs).
- Howie Glover, 86, Canadian ice hockey player (Detroit Red Wings).
- Tom Kurvers, 58, American ice hockey player (New York Islanders, Montreal Canadiens, New Jersey Devils), Stanley Cup champion (1986).
- René Robert, 72, Canadian ice hockey player (Buffalo Sabres, Toronto Maple Leafs, Colorado Rockies).

=== July ===
- Gerry Abel, 76, American ice hockey player (Detroit Red Wings).
- Matīss Kivlenieks, 24, Latvian ice hockey goaltender (Columbus Blue Jackets, national team).
- Bryan Watson, 78, Canadian ice hockey player (Detroit Red Wings, Pittsburgh Penguins, Washington Capitals).
- Pentti Isotalo, 94, Finnish Olympic ice hockey player (1952) and referee (1964).
- Ron Hutchinson, 84, Canadian ice hockey player (New York Rangers).
- Ed Patenaude, 71, Canadian ice hockey player (Edmonton Oilers, Indianapolis Racers).
- Yevgeni Pupkov, 45, Kazakhstani ice hockey player (Kazzinc-Torpedo, SKA Saint Petersburg, Khimik Voskresensk) and coach, COVID-19.
- Einar Bruno Larsen, 81, Norwegian footballer (Vålerenga, national team) and Olympic ice hockey player (1964).
- Frank Ashworth, 94, Canadian ice hockey player (Chicago Blackhawks).

=== August ===
- Gord Cruickshank, 56, Canadian ice hockey player (Maine Mariners).
- Tony Esposito, 78, Canadian-American Hall of Fame ice hockey player (Chicago Black Hawks, Montreal Canadiens), Stanley Cup champion (1969).
- Rod Gilbert, 80, Canadian Hall of Fame ice hockey player (New York Rangers).
- Ernest Aljančič Jr., 76, Slovenian ice hockey player (Yugoslavia national team).
- Jimmy Hayes, 31, American ice hockey player (Boston Bruins, Florida Panthers, Chicago Blackhawks).
- Jan Suchý, 76, Czech ice hockey player (HC Dukla Jihlava), Olympic silver medalist (1968).
- Vladimir Shadrin, 73, Russian ice hockey player (HC Spartak Moscow, Oji Eagles) and coach, Olympic champion (1972, 1976).
- Jim Bartlett, 89, Canadian ice hockey player (New York Rangers, Boston Bruins, Montreal Canadiens).
- Sune Bergman, 68, Swedish ice hockey player (Troja-Ljungby) and coach (HV71, Frisk Asker).
- Ray Kinasewich, 87, Canadian ice hockey player (Hershey Bears) and coach (Edmonton Oilers).

=== September ===
- Jack Egers, 72, Canadian ice hockey player (New York Rangers, St. Louis Blues, Washington Capitals).
- Fern Perrault, 94, Canadian ice hockey player (New York Rangers).
- Fred Stanfield, 77, Canadian ice hockey player (Chicago Blackhawks, Boston Bruins, Buffalo Sabres).
- Ladislav Lubina, 54, Czech ice hockey player (HC Pardubice, HC Dukla Jihlava, HC Oceláři Třinec), Olympic bronze medallist (1992).
- Lou Angotti, 83, Canadian ice hockey player (Chicago Blackhawks, New York Rangers, St. Louis Blues) and coach.
- Tomáš Prokop, 27, Czech ice hockey player (Mountfield HK, Motor České Budějovice, Draci Šumperk).
- Karl-Sören Hedlund, 83, Swedish ice hockey player (Västerås, Skellefteå AIK, national team).

=== October ===
- Neil Hawryliw, 65, Canadian ice hockey player (New York Islanders).
- Jim McInally, 73, Canadian ice hockey player (Hamilton Red Wings, Nashville Dixie Flyers).
- Leo Boivin, 89, Canadian Hall of Fame ice hockey player (Boston Bruins, Toronto Maple Leafs, Pittsburgh Penguins) and coach.
- Tony Featherstone, 72, Canadian ice hockey player (Oakland/California Golden Seals, Minnesota North Stars, Toronto Toros).
- Ron Serafini, 67, American ice hockey player (California Golden Seals).

=== November ===
- John Aiken, 89, American ice hockey player (Montreal Canadiens).
- François Blank, 90, Swiss Olympic ice hockey player (1952).
- Boris Sádecký, 24, Slovak ice hockey player (HK Orange 20, HC Slovan Bratislava, Bratislava Capitals).
- Charlie Burns, 85, American-born Canadian ice hockey player (Minnesota North Stars, Boston Bruins, Pittsburgh Penguins), world champion (1958).
- Dušan Pašek, 36, Slovak ice hockey player (HC Slovan Bratislava, HC Košice, ŠHK 37 Piešťany).
- Bill Reichart, 86, Canadian-born American Olympic ice hockey player (1964).
- Rašid Šemšedinović, 80, Serbian Olympic ice hockey player (1964).
- Tom Colley, 68, Canadian ice hockey player (Minnesota North Stars).
- Enrico Bacher, 80, Italian Olympic ice hockey player (1964).
- Rod Blackburn, 82, American ice hockey player (New Hampshire Wildcats).
- Matti Keinonen, 80, Finnish Hall of Fame ice hockey player (Lukko, HJK, national team).
- Günter Oberhuber, 67, Austrian Olympic ice hockey player.

=== December ===
- Peter Hayek, 64, American ice hockey player (Minnesota North Stars).
- Jim Troumbly, 93, American ice hockey player.
- Gerry Foley, 89, American-Canadian ice hockey player (New York Rangers, Toronto Maple Leafs, Los Angeles Kings).
- Len Thornson, 88, Canadian ice hockey player (Fort Wayne Komets, Indianapolis Chiefs, Huntington Hornets).
- Bob Peters, 84, Canadian ice hockey coach (Bemidji State Beavers).
- Bill Mahoney, 82, Canadian ice hockey coach (Minnesota North Stars).
- Greg Tebbutt, 64, Canadian ice hockey player (Pittsburgh Penguins).
- Curt Ridley, 70, Canadian ice hockey player (Vancouver Canucks, Toronto Maple Leafs, New York Rangers).
- Giovanni Mastel, 78, Italian Olympic ice hockey player.
- Bob McCammon, 80, Canadian ice hockey coach and executive (Vancouver Canucks, Philadelphia Flyers).
- Ralph Warburton, 97, American Olympic ice hockey player (1948).
- Jim Wiley, 71, Canadian ice hockey player (Pittsburgh Penguins, Vancouver Canucks) and coach (San Jose Sharks).
- Thomas Milani, 69, Canadian-born Italian ice hockey player (Minnesota Fighting Saints, Kalamazoo Wings, Italy national team).
- Jean Vassieux, 72, French ice hockey player (Ours de Villard-de-Lans, national team).

== See also ==
- 2020 in ice hockey
- 2022 in ice hockey
- 2021 in sports
