= 2020–21 NHL transactions =

The following is a list of all team-to-team transactions that have occurred in the National Hockey League during the 2020–21 NHL season. It lists which team each player has been traded to, signed by, or claimed by, and for which player(s) or draft pick(s), if applicable. Players who have retired or that have had their contracts terminated are also listed. The 2020–21 NHL trade deadline was on April 12, 2021. Players traded or claimed off waivers after this date were not eligible to play in the 2021 Stanley Cup playoffs.

== Retirement ==
Date	Player	Last Team	Ref
October 8, 2020	Justin Williams	Carolina Hurricanes	
October 9, 2020	Connor Hobbs	Washington Capitals	
October 26, 2020	Martin Hanzal	Dallas Stars	
October 26, 2020	Trevor Daley	Detroit Red Wings	
December 22, 2020	Deryk Engelland	Vegas Golden Knights	
December 27, 2020	Mark Letestu	Winnipeg Jets	
December 30, 2020	Ryan Callahan	Ottawa Senators	
January 5, 2021	Colin Wilson	Colorado Avalanche	
January 9, 2021	Corey Crawford	New Jersey Devils	
January 11, 2021	Jay Bouwmeester	St. Louis Blues	
January 15, 2021	Casey Nelson	Buffalo Sabres	
January 28, 2021	Jimmy Howard	Detroit Red Wings	
February 9, 2021	Mikko Koivu	Columbus Blue Jackets	
April 26, 2021	Andrew Shaw	Chicago Blackhawks	
May 8, 2021	Ryan Miller^{1}	Anaheim Ducks	
June 13, 2021	Stephen Johns	Dallas Stars	
June 15, 2021	Drew Shore	Carolina Hurricanes	
June 18, 2021	Zach Trotman	Pittsburgh Penguins	
June 21, 2021	J. T. Brown	Minnesota Wild	
June 23, 2021	Carl Gunnarsson	St. Louis Blues	
June 25, 2021	Beau Bennett	Arizona Coyotes	
July 13, 2021	Pekka Rinne	Nashville Predators	
July 14, 2021	Kevan Miller	Boston Bruins	
July 20, 2021	Yannick Weber	Pittsburgh Penguins	
July 21, 2021	Ty Lewis	Colorado Avalanche	
July 22, 2021	Matt Calvert	Colorado Avalanche	

=== Notes ===
1. Miller announced on April 29, 2021 that he would retire at the conclusion of the season; the Ducks played their final game of the year on May 8, 2021.

== Contract terminations ==
A team and player may mutually agree to terminate a player's contract at any time. All players must clear waivers before having a contract terminated.

Buyouts can only occur at specific times of the year. For more details on contract terminations as buyouts:

Teams may buy out player contracts (after the conclusion of a season) for a portion of the remaining value of the contract, paid over a period of twice the remaining length of the contract. This reduced number and extended period is applied to the cap hit as well.

- If the player was under the age of 26 at the time of the buyout the player's pay and cap hit will reduced by a factor of 2/3 over the extended period.
- If the player was 26 or older at the time of the buyout the player's pay and cap hit will reduced by a factor of 1/3 over the extended period.
- If the player was 35 or older at the time of signing the contract the player's pay will be reduced by a factor of 1/3, but the cap hit will not be reduced over the extended period.

Injured players cannot be bought out.

Date	Player	Previous team	Notes	Ref
October 6, 2020	Jack Johnson	Pittsburgh Penguins	Buyout	
October 7, 2020	Justin Abdelkader	Detroit Red Wings	Buyout	
October 7, 2020	Karl Alzner	Montreal Canadiens	Buyout	
October 8, 2020	Steven Santini	Nashville Predators	Buyout	
October 8, 2020	Kyle Turris	Nashville Predators	Buyout	
October 9, 2020	Cory Schneider	New Jersey Devils	Buyout	
October 9, 2020	Alexander Wennberg	Columbus Blue Jackets	Buyout	
October 29, 2020	Mitchell Miller^{1}	Arizona Coyotes	Termination	
December 25, 2020	Danil Yurtaikin	San Jose Sharks	Mutual termination	
January 1, 2021	Alexandre Alain	Montreal Canadiens	Mutual termination	
January 8, 2021	Josh Anderson	Colorado Avalanche	Mutual termination	
January 17, 2021	Nick Seeler	Chicago Blackhawks	Mutual termination	
January 23, 2021	Jonathan Ang	Florida Panthers	Mutual termination	
January 27, 2021	Jeremy Bracco	Carolina Hurricanes	Mutual termination	
February 15, 2021	Par Lindholm	Boston Bruins	Mutual termination	
February 26, 2021	Filip Chlapik	Ottawa Senators	Mutual termination	
April 7, 2021	Jason Cotton	Carolina Hurricanes	Mutual termination	
April 10, 2021	Nikita Gusev	New Jersey Devils	Mutual termination	
May 18, 2021	Pavel Shen	Boston Bruins	Mutual termination	
July 13, 2021	Zach Parise	Minnesota Wild	Buyout	
July 13, 2021	Ryan Suter	Minnesota Wild	Buyout	
July 15, 2021	Keith Yandle	Florida Panthers	Buyout	

=== Notes ===
1. Miller was a draft-related restricted free agent for Arizona at the time of the termination, and was not under contract.

== Free agency ==
Note: This does not include players who have re-signed with their previous team as an unrestricted free agent or as a restricted free agent.

Date	Player	New team	Previous team	Ref
October 9, 2020	Wayne Simmonds	Toronto Maple Leafs	Buffalo Sabres	
October 9, 2020	Bobby Ryan	Detroit Red Wings	Ottawa Senators	
October 9, 2020	Radko Gudas	Florida Panthers	Washington Capitals	
October 9, 2020	John Hayden	Arizona Coyotes	New Jersey Devils	
October 9, 2020	Tyler Pitlick	Arizona Coyotes	Philadelphia Flyers	
October 9, 2020	Jon Merrill	Detroit Red Wings	Vegas Golden Knights	
October 9, 2020	Carter Verhaeghe	Florida Panthers	Tampa Bay Lightning	
October 9, 2020	Henrik Lundqvist	Washington Capitals	New York Rangers	
October 9, 2020	Kyle Turris	Edmonton Oilers	Nashville Predators	
October 9, 2020	Cam Talbot	Minnesota Wild	Calgary Flames	
October 9, 2020	Alan Quine	Edmonton Oilers	Calgary Flames	
October 9, 2020	Kevin Rooney	New York Rangers	New Jersey Devils	
October 9, 2020	Braden Holtby	Vancouver Canucks	Washington Capitals	
October 9, 2020	Joseph Cramarossa	Minnesota Wild	Chicago Blackhawks	
October 9, 2020	Colin Blackwell	New York Rangers	Nashville Predators	
October 9, 2020	Anton Forsberg	Edmonton Oilers	Carolina Hurricanes	
October 9, 2020	Keith Kinkaid	New York Rangers	Montreal Canadiens	
October 9, 2020	Alexander Wennberg	Florida Panthers	Columbus Blue Jackets	
October 9, 2020	Mark Jankowski	Pittsburgh Penguins	Calgary Flames	
October 9, 2020	Evan Rodrigues	Pittsburgh Penguins	Toronto Maple Leafs	
October 9, 2020	Derek Grant	Anaheim Ducks	Philadelphia Flyers	
October 9, 2020	Mark Borowiecki	Nashville Predators	Ottawa Senators	
October 9, 2020	Seth Griffith	Edmonton Oilers	Winnipeg Jets	
October 9, 2020	Kevin Shattenkirk	Anaheim Ducks	Tampa Bay Lightning	
October 9, 2020	Tobias Rieder	Buffalo Sabres	Calgary Flames	
October 9, 2020	Matt Benning	Nashville Predators	Edmonton Oilers	
October 9, 2020	Jack Johnson	New York Rangers	Pittsburgh Penguins	
October 9, 2020	Alex Petrovic	Calgary Flames	Boston Bruins	
October 9, 2020	Justin Schultz	Washington Capitals	Pittsburgh Penguins	
October 9, 2020	Josh Currie	Pittsburgh Penguins	Edmonton Oilers	
October 9, 2020	Anthony Bitetto	New York Rangers	Winnipeg Jets	
October 9, 2020	Dakota Mermis	Minnesota Wild	New Jersey Devils	
October 9, 2020	Jacob Markstrom	Calgary Flames	Vancouver Canucks	
October 9, 2020	Andreas Borgman	Tampa Bay Lightning	St. Louis Blues	
October 9, 2020	Christopher Gibson	Tampa Bay Lightning	New York Islanders	
October 9, 2020	Ryan Lomberg	Florida Panthers	Calgary Flames	
October 9, 2020	Matt Irwin	Buffalo Sabres	Anaheim Ducks	
October 9, 2020	Brandon Baddock	Montreal Canadiens	New Jersey Devils	
October 9, 2020	Riley Barber	Detroit Red Wings	Pittsburgh Penguins	
October 9, 2020	Kevin Boyle	Detroit Red Wings	Anaheim Ducks	
October 9, 2020	Kyle Criscuolo	Detroit Red Wings	Anaheim Ducks	
October 9, 2020	Logan Shaw	Ottawa Senators	Winnipeg Jets	
October 9, 2020	Miikka Salomaki	Colorado Avalanche	Toronto Maple Leafs	
October 9, 2020	Kiefer Sherwood	Colorado Avalanche	Anaheim Ducks	
October 9, 2020	Mike Vecchione	Colorado Avalanche	St. Louis Blues	
October 9, 2020	Jon Gillies	St. Louis Blues	Calgary Flames	
October 9, 2020	Jonny Brodzinski	New York Rangers	San Jose Sharks	
October 9, 2020	Anthony Greco	New York Rangers	San Jose Sharks	
October 9, 2020	Vinnie Hinostroza	Florida Panthers	Arizona Coyotes	
October 9, 2020	T.J. Brodie	Toronto Maple Leafs	Calgary Flames	
October 9, 2020	Nick Cousins	Nashville Predators	Vegas Golden Knights	
October 9, 2020	Torey Krug	St. Louis Blues	Boston Bruins	
October 9, 2020	Derrick Pouliot	Philadelphia Flyers	St. Louis Blues	
October 9, 2020	Brandon Davidson	Buffalo Sabres	San Jose Sharks	
October 9, 2020	Gavin Bayreuther	Columbus Blue Jackets	Dallas Stars	
October 9, 2020	Christopher Tanev	Calgary Flames	Vancouver Canucks	
October 9, 2020	Corey Crawford	New Jersey Devils	Chicago Blackhawks	
October 9, 2020	Vinni Lettieri	Anaheim Ducks	New York Rangers	
October 9, 2020	Mark Alt	Los Angeles Kings	Colorado Avalanche	
October 9, 2020	Troy Grosenick	Los Angeles Kings	Nashville Predators	
October 9, 2020	Steven Santini	St. Louis Blues	Nashville Predators	
October 10, 2020	Frederick Gaudreau	Pittsburgh Penguins	Nashville Predators	
October 10, 2020	Maxime Lagace	Pittsburgh Penguins	Boston Bruins	
October 10, 2020	Andy Welinski	Anaheim Ducks	Philadelphia Flyers	
October 10, 2020	Tomas Jurco	Vegas Golden Knights	Edmonton Oilers	
October 10, 2020	Thomas Greiss	Detroit Red Wings	New York Islanders	
October 10, 2020	Craig Smith	Boston Bruins	Nashville Predators	
October 10, 2020	Tyson Barrie	Edmonton Oilers	Toronto Maple Leafs	
October 10, 2020	Troy Stecher	Detroit Red Wings	Vancouver Canucks	
October 10, 2020	Cameron Schilling	Washington Capitals	Winnipeg Jets	
October 10, 2020	Mikko Koivu	Columbus Blue Jackets	Minnesota Wild	
October 10, 2020	Nate Thompson	Winnipeg Jets	Philadelphia Flyers	
October 10, 2020	Mark Pysyk	Dallas Stars	Florida Panthers	
October 10, 2020	Curtis McKenzie	St. Louis Blues	Vegas Golden Knights	
October 10, 2020	Johan Larsson	Arizona Coyotes	Buffalo Sabres	
October 10, 2020	Sam Anas	St. Louis Blues	Minnesota Wild	
October 10, 2020	Cody Eakin	Buffalo Sabres	Winnipeg Jets	
October 10, 2020	Louis Domingue	Calgary Flames	Vancouver Canucks	
October 10, 2020	Jesper Fast	Carolina Hurricanes	New York Rangers	
October 10, 2020	Travis Boyd	Toronto Maple Leafs	Washington Capitals	
October 10, 2020	Trevor van Riemsdyk	Washington Capitals	Carolina Hurricanes	
October 10, 2020	Dryden Hunt	Arizona Coyotes	Florida Panthers	
October 10, 2020	Zach Bogosian	Toronto Maple Leafs	Tampa Bay Lightning	
October 10, 2020	Dominic Toninato	Winnipeg Jets	Florida Panthers	
October 10, 2020	Paul LaDue	Washington Capitals	Los Angeles Kings	
October 11, 2020	Derek Forbort	Winnipeg Jets	Calgary Flames	
October 11, 2020	Daniel Carr	Washington Capitals	Nashville Predators	
October 11, 2020	Vladislav Namestnikov	Detroit Red Wings	Colorado Avalanche	
October 11, 2020	Danny O'Regan	Vegas Golden Knights	New York Rangers	
October 11, 2020	Scott Wedgewood	New Jersey Devils	Tampa Bay Lightning	
October 11, 2020	Kyle Clifford	St. Louis Blues	Toronto Maple Leafs	
October 11, 2020	Taylor Hall	Buffalo Sabres	Arizona Coyotes	
October 11, 2020	Jimmy Vesey	Toronto Maple Leafs	Buffalo Sabres	
October 12, 2020	Mattias Janmark	Chicago Blackhawks	Dallas Stars	
October 12, 2020	Tyler Toffoli	Montreal Canadiens	Vancouver Canucks	
October 12, 2020	Joakim Ryan	Carolina Hurricanes	Los Angeles Kings	
October 12, 2020	Erik Gustafsson	Philadelphia Flyers	Calgary Flames	
October 12, 2020	Brad Richardson	Nashville Predators	Arizona Coyotes	
October 12, 2020	Lucas Wallmark	Chicago Blackhawks	Florida Panthers	
October 12, 2020	Alex Pietrangelo	Vegas Golden Knights	St. Louis Blues	
October 12, 2020	Austin Czarnik	New York Islanders	Calgary Flames	
October 13, 2020	Kasimir Kaskisuo	Nashville Predators	Toronto Maple Leafs	
October 13, 2020	Tyler Lewington	Nashville Predators	Washington Capitals	
October 13, 2020	Patrick Marleau	San Jose Sharks	Pittsburgh Penguins	
October 13, 2020	Matt Nieto	San Jose Sharks	Colorado Avalanche	
October 13, 2020	Aaron Dell	Toronto Maple Leafs	San Jose Sharks	
October 14, 2020	Callum Booth	Boston Bruins	Carolina Hurricanes	
October 14, 2020	Greg McKegg	Boston Bruins	New York Rangers	
October 15, 2020	Evgenii Dadonov	Ottawa Senators	Florida Panthers	
October 16, 2020	Jeremy Bracco	Carolina Hurricanes	Toronto Maple Leafs	
October 16, 2020	Sheldon Rempal	Carolina Hurricanes	Los Angeles Kings	
October 16, 2020	Joe Thornton	Toronto Maple Leafs	San Jose Sharks	
October 17, 2020	Cody Ceci	Pittsburgh Penguins	Toronto Maple Leafs	
October 19, 2020	Steven Fogarty	Buffalo Sabres	New York Rangers	
October 19, 2020	Jayce Hawryluk	Vancouver Canucks	Ottawa Senators	
October 19, 2020	Ian McCoshen	Minnesota Wild	Chicago Blackhawks	
October 19, 2020	Joakim Nordstrom	Calgary Flames	Boston Bruins	
October 21, 2020	Scott Wilson	Florida Panthers	Buffalo Sabres	
October 22, 2020	Antoine Bibeau	Carolina Hurricanes	Colorado Avalanche	
October 22, 2020	Dominik Simon	Calgary Flames	Pittsburgh Penguins	
October 22, 2020	Dmitry Kulikov	New Jersey Devils	Winnipeg Jets	
October 24, 2020	Josh Leivo	Calgary Flames	Vancouver Canucks	
October 28, 2020	Alex Galchenyuk	Ottawa Senators	Minnesota Wild	
October 30, 2020	Michael Hutchinson	Toronto Maple Leafs	Colorado Avalanche	
November 1, 2020	Dominik Kahun	Edmonton Oilers	Buffalo Sabres	
November 2, 2020	Kurtis Gabriel	San Jose Sharks	Philadelphia Flyers	
November 5, 2020	Marko Dano	Winnipeg Jets	Columbus Blue Jackets	
November 13, 2020	Micheal Haley	Ottawa Senators	New York Rangers	
December 16, 2020	Andrew Hammond	Minnesota Wild	Buffalo Sabres	
December 17, 2020	Anthony Duclair	Florida Panthers	Ottawa Senators	
December 21, 2020	Drake Caggiula	Arizona Coyotes	Chicago Blackhawks	
December 22, 2020	Conor Sheary	Washington Capitals	Pittsburgh Penguins	
December 23, 2020	Michael Frolik	Montreal Canadiens	Buffalo Sabres	
December 23, 2020	Erik Haula	Nashville Predators	Florida Panthers	
December 26, 2020	Slater Koekkoek	Edmonton Oilers	Chicago Blackhawks	
December 26, 2020	Carl Soderberg	Chicago Blackhawks	Arizona Coyotes	
December 28, 2020	Corey Perry	Montreal Canadiens	Dallas Stars	
December 28, 2020	Andreas Athanasiou	Los Angeles Kings	Edmonton Oilers	
December 30, 2020	Zdeno Chara	Washington Capitals	Boston Bruins	
December 30, 2020	Derick Brassard	Arizona Coyotes	New York Islanders	
January 7, 2021	Sami Vatanen	New Jersey Devils	Carolina Hurricanes	
January 8, 2021	Riley Sheahan	Buffalo Sabres	Edmonton Oilers	
January 10, 2021	Michael Del Zotto	Columbus Blue Jackets	Anaheim Ducks	
January 10, 2021	Fredrik Claesson	San Jose Sharks	New Jersey Devils	
January 11, 2021	Mike Hoffman	St. Louis Blues	Florida Panthers	
January 11, 2021	Frederik Gauthier	Arizona Coyotes	Toronto Maple Leafs	
January 12, 2021	Boo Nieves	Tampa Bay Lightning	New York Rangers	
January 12, 2021	Travis Hamonic	Vancouver Canucks	Calgary Flames	
January 13, 2021	Craig Anderson	Washington Capitals	Ottawa Senators	
January 13, 2021	Kevin Connauton	Florida Panthers	Colorado Avalanche	
January 13, 2021	Devin Shore	Edmonton Oilers	Columbus Blue Jackets	
January 13, 2021	Trevor Lewis	Winnipeg Jets	Los Angeles Kings	
January 14, 2021	Cory Schneider	New York Islanders	New Jersey Devils	
January 15, 2021	Ben Hutton	Anaheim Ducks	Los Angeles Kings	
January 17, 2021	Brett Ritchie	Calgary Flames	Boston Bruins	
January 27, 2021	Yannick Weber	Pittsburgh Penguins	Nashville Predators	
January 28, 2021	Madison Bowey	Chicago Blackhawks	Detroit Red Wings	
February 7, 2021	Scott Sabourin	Toronto Maple Leafs	Ottawa Senators	
April 11, 2021	Cody Goloubef	Ottawa Senators	Detroit Red Wings	
April 11, 2021	Nikita Gusev	Florida Panthers	New Jersey Devils	

=== Imports ===
This section is for players who were not previously on contract with NHL teams in the past season. Listed is the last team and league they were under contract with.

Date	Player	New team	Previous team	League	Ref
October 11, 2020	Maxim Golod	Anaheim Ducks	Erie Otters	OHL	
October 16, 2020	David Gust	Carolina Hurricanes	Charlotte Checkers	AHL	
October 21, 2020	Drew Shore	Carolina Hurricanes	Torpedo Nizhny Novgorod	KHL	
October 23, 2020	Nikita Nesterov	Calgary Flames	HC CSKA Moscow	KHL	
November 4, 2020	Dustin Tokarski	Buffalo Sabres	Wilkes-Barre/Scranton Penguins	AHL	
January 9, 2021	Cam Johnson	Columbus Blue Jackets	Florida Everblades	ECHL	
January 21, 2021	Peyton Jones	Colorado Avalanche	Colorado Eagles	AHL	
March 3, 2021	Mason Geertsen	New York Rangers	Hartford Wolf Pack	AHL	
March 5, 2021	Beck Warm	Carolina Hurricanes	Chicago Wolves	AHL	
March 14, 2021	Josh Dunne	Columbus Blue Jackets	Clarkson Golden Knights	NCAA	
March 16, 2021	Daniil Miromanov	Vegas Golden Knights	HC Sochi	KHL	
March 19, 2021	Michael Houser	Buffalo Sabres	Rochester Americans	AHL	
March 19, 2021	Vladislav Provolnev	Arizona Coyotes	Severstal Cherepovets	KHL	
March 24, 2021	Max Willman	Philadelphia Flyers	Lehigh Valley Phantoms	AHL	
March 28, 2021	Alex Steeves	Toronto Maple Leafs	Notre Dame Fighting Irish	NCAA	
March 30, 2021	Liam O'Brien	Colorado Avalanche	Colorado Eagles	AHL	
March 30, 2021	Mike Hardman	Chicago Blackhawks	Boston College Eagles	NCAA	
March 30, 2021	Zack Hayes	Vegas Golden Knights	Henderson Silver Knights	AHL	
March 30, 2021	Keaton Middleton	Colorado Avalanche	Colorado Eagles	AHL	
March 31, 2021	Jordan Kawaguchi	Dallas Stars	North Dakota Fighting Hawks	NCAA	
March 31, 2021	Odeen Tufto	Tampa Bay Lightning	Quinnipiac Bobcats	NCAA	
April 1, 2021	Matt Kiersted	Florida Panthers	North Dakota Fighting Hawks	NCAA	
April 1, 2021	Adam Scheel	Dallas Stars	North Dakota Fighting Hawks	NCAA	
April 2, 2021	Corey Schueneman	Montreal Canadiens	Laval Rocket	AHL	
April 9, 2021	Ken Appleby	New York Islanders	Bridgeport Sound Tigers	AHL	
April 9, 2021	Cole Kehler	Winnipeg Jets	Manitoba Moose	AHL	
April 11, 2021	Josh Healey	Nashville Predators	Milwaukee Admirals	AHL	
April 11, 2021	Walker Duehr	Calgary Flames	Minnesota State Mavericks	NCAA	
April 12, 2021	Zach Sawchenko	San Jose Sharks	San Jose Barracuda	AHL	
April 13, 2021	Jackson Cates	Philadelphia Flyers	Minnesota Duluth Bulldogs	NCAA	
April 19, 2021	Brady Lyle	Boston Bruins	Providence Bruins	AHL	
May 3, 2021	Justin Danforth	Columbus Blue Jackets	HC Vityaz	KHL	
May 4, 2021	Stefanos Lekkas	Buffalo Sabres	Fort Wayne Komets	ECHL	
May 4, 2021	Karel Vejmelka	Arizona Coyotes	HC Kometa Brno	ELH	
May 5, 2021	Kirill Semyonov	Toronto Maple Leafs	Avangard Omsk	KHL	
May 11, 2021	Cavan Fitzgerald	Carolina Hurricanes	Chicago Wolves	AHL	
May 12, 2021	Simon Ryfors	Tampa Bay Lightning	Rogle BK	SHL	
May 12, 2021	Luke Henman	Seattle Kraken	Blainville-Boisbriand Armada	QMJHL	
May 13, 2021	Arvid Soderblom	Chicago Blackhawks	Skelleftea AIK	SHL	
May 19, 2021	Erik Kallgren	Toronto Maple Leafs	Vaxjo Lakers	SHL	
May 29, 2021	Vladimir Tkachyov	Los Angeles Kings	SKA Saint Petersburg	KHL	
May 31, 2021	Jeff Malott	Winnipeg Jets	Manitoba Moose	AHL	
May 31, 2021	Wyatt Newpower	Detroit Red Wings	Cleveland Monsters	AHL	

== Trades ==
* Retained Salary Transaction: Each team is allowed up to three contracts on their payroll where they have retained salary in a trade (i.e. the player no longer plays with Team A due to a trade to Team B, but Team A still retains some salary). Only up to 50% of a player's contract can be kept, and only up to 15% of a team's salary cap can be taken up by retained salary. A contract can only be involved in one of these trades twice.

Trade was restructured due to complications of play due to the COVID-19 pandemic.

Hover over retained salary or conditional transactions for more information.

=== October ===
October 6, 2020	To Columbus Blue Jackets Max Domi; 3rd-round pick in 2020	To Montreal Canadiens Josh Anderson
October 7, 2020	To Ottawa Senators Matt Murray	To Pittsburgh Penguins Jonathan Gruden; 2nd-round pick in 2020
October 7, 2020	To Minnesota Wild Nick Bonino; NJD 2nd-round pick in 2020; MIN 3rd-round pick in 2020	To Nashville Predators Luke Kunin; 4th-round pick in 2020
October 7, 2020	To Los Angeles Kings Lias Andersson	To New York Rangers VGK 2nd-round pick in 2020
October 8, 2020	To Florida Panthers Markus Nutivaara	To Columbus Blue Jackets Cliff Pu
October 8, 2020	To Ottawa Senators Erik Gudbranson	To Anaheim Ducks EDM 5th-round pick in 2021
October 8, 2020	To New Jersey Devils Ryan Murray	To Columbus Blue Jackets 5th-round pick in 2021
October 9, 2020	To Winnipeg Jets Paul Stastny	To Vegas Golden Knights Carl Dahlstrom conditional 4th-round pick in 2022
October 10, 2020	To Ottawa Senators Austin Watson	To Nashville Predators COL 4th-round pick in 2021
October 10, 2020	To Colorado Avalanche Brandon Saad*; Dennis Gilbert	To Chicago Blackhawks Nikita Zadorov; Anton Lindholm
October 10, 2020	To New Jersey Devils Andreas Johnsson	To Toronto Maple Leafs Joey Anderson
October 11, 2020	To New York Islanders A. J. Greer	To Colorado Avalanche Kyle Burroughs
October 12, 2020	To Colorado Avalanche Devon Toews	To New York Islanders 2nd-round pick in 2021; 2nd-round pick in 2022
October 12, 2020	To Vancouver Canucks Nate Schmidt	To Vegas Golden Knights 3rd-round pick in 2022

Pick-only 2020 NHL entry draft trades
October 6, 2020	To New York Rangers 1st-round pick in 2020 (#19 overall)	To Calgary Flames CAR 1st-round pick in 2020 (#22 overall); 3rd-round pick in 2020 (#72 overall)
October 6, 2020	To Washington Capitals NYR 1st-round pick in 2020 (#22 overall)	To Calgary Flames 1st-round pick in 2020 (#24 overall); ARI 3rd-round pick in 2020 (#80 overall)
October 7, 2020	To Buffalo Sabres 2nd-round pick in 2020 (#34 overall)	To San Jose Sharks 2nd-round pick in 2020 (#38 overall); 4th-round pick in 2020 (#100 overall)
October 7, 2020	To Ottawa Senators 2nd-round pick in 2020 (#44 overall)	To Toronto Maple Leafs NYI 2nd-round pick in 2020 (#59 overall); 3rd-round pick in 2020 (#64 overall)
October 7, 2020	To Los Angeles Kings EDM 2nd-round pick in 2020 (#45 overall)	To Detroit Red Wings VAN 2nd-round pick in 2020 (#51 overall); 4th-round pick in 2020 (#97 overall)
October 7, 2020	To Tampa Bay Lightning STL 2nd-round pick in 2020 (#57 overall)	To Montreal Canadiens 4th-round pick in 2020 (#124 overall); 2nd-round pick in 2021
October 7, 2020	To Minnesota Wild SJS 3rd-round pick in 2020 (#65 overall)	To Detroit Red Wings MIN 3rd-round pick in 2020 (#70 overall); 5th-round pick in 2020 (#132 overall)
October 7, 2020	To San Jose Sharks 3rd-round pick in 2020 (#76 overall)	To Edmonton Oilers BUF 4th-round pick in 2020 (#100 overall); OTT 5th-round pick in 2020 (#126 overall)
October 7, 2020	To Philadelphia Flyers DET 4th-round pick in 2020 (#94 overall)	To Tampa Bay Lightning 4th-round pick in 2020 (#116 overall); 5th-round pick in 2020 (#147 overall)
October 7, 2020	To San Jose Sharks ANA 4th-round pick in 2020 (#98 overall)	To Montreal Canadiens WSH 3rd-round pick in 2021
October 7, 2020	To New York Rangers 5th-round pick in 2020 (#127 overall)	To San Jose Sharks 7th-round pick in 2020 (#196 overall); VAN 7th-round pick in 2020 (#206 overall)
October 7, 2020	To Vegas Golden Knights 5th-round pick in 2020 (#125 overall)	To Detroit Red Wings 4th-round pick in 2022
October 7, 2020	To Philadelphia Flyers 5th-round pick in 2020 (#135 overall)	To Nashville Predators MTL 7th-round pick in 2020 (#202 overall); 7th-round pick in 2020 (#209 overall)
October 7, 2020	To Toronto Maple Leafs TOR 5th-round pick in 2020 (#137 overall)	To Florida Panthers VGK 5th-round pick in 2020 (#153 overall); STL 7th-round pick in 2020 (#212 overall)
October 7, 2020	To Colorado Avalanche 5th-round pick in 2020 (#139 overall)	To Pittsburgh Penguins 5th-round pick in 2020 (#149 overall); 7th-round pick in 2020 (#211 overall)
October 7, 2020	To Los Angeles Kings MTL 5th-round pick in 2020 (#140 overall)	To Carolina Hurricanes 6th-round pick in 2020 (#159 overall); 7th-round pick in 2021
October 7, 2020	To Minnesota Wild CAR 5th-round pick in 2020 (#146 overall)	To St. Louis Blues 6th-round pick in 2020 (#163 overall); 7th-round pick in 2020 (#194 overall)
October 7, 2020	To Anaheim Ducks 7th-round pick in 2020 (#207 overall)	To Columbus Blue Jackets conditional 7th-round pick in 2021 or 7th-round pick in 2022
October 7, 2020	Trade restructured due to shortened 2020–21 NHL season	
October 7, 2020	To Anaheim Ducks 7th-round pick in 2020 (#207 overall)	To Columbus Blue Jackets conditional 7th-round pick in 2022 or 7th-round pick in 2023
October 7, 2020	To Chicago Blackhawks OTT 7th-round pick in 2020 (#188 overall)	To Montreal Canadiens MTL 7th-round pick in 2021
October 7, 2020	To Washington Capitals COL 7th-round pick in 2020 (#211 overall)	To Pittsburgh Penguins 7th-round pick in 2021
October 7, 2020	To Toronto Maple Leafs 7th-round pick in 2020 (#213 overall)	To Boston Bruins 7th-round pick in 2021

=== December ===
December 11, 2020	To New York Islanders Dmytro Timashov	To Detroit Red Wings future considerations
December 21, 2020	To Nashville Predators Michael Carcone	To Ottawa Senators Zach Magwood
December 26, 2020	To Ottawa Senators Derek Stepan	To Arizona Coyotes CBJ 2nd-round pick in 2021
December 27, 2020	To Ottawa Senators Braydon Coburn; Cedric Paquette; 2nd-round pick in 2022	To Tampa Bay Lightning Marian Gaborik; Anders Nilsson

=== January ===
January 12, 2021	To Carolina Hurricanes Maxime Lajoie	To Ottawa Senators Clark Bishop
January 19, 2021	To Minnesota Wild Ian Cole*	To Colorado Avalanche Greg Pateryn
January 23, 2021	To Columbus Blue Jackets Patrik Laine*; Jack Roslovic	To Winnipeg Jets Pierre-Luc Dubois; 3rd-round pick in 2022
January 27, 2021	To Anaheim Ducks Trevor Carrick	To San Jose Sharks Jack Kopacka
January 27, 2021	To San Jose Sharks Christian Jaros	To Ottawa Senators Jack Kopacka; 7th-round pick in 2022

=== February ===
February 13, 2021	To Carolina Hurricanes Alex Galchenyuk; Cedric Paquette	To Ottawa Senators Ryan Dzingel
February 13, 2021	To Columbus Blue Jackets Gregory Hofmann	To Carolina Hurricanes 7th-round pick in 2022
February 15, 2021	To Toronto Maple Leafs Alex Galchenyuk	To Carolina Hurricanes Yegor Korshkov; David Warsofsky

=== March ===
March 12, 2021	To Columbus Blue Jackets Mikko Lehtonen	To Toronto Maple Leafs Veini Vehvilainen
March 20, 2021	To Colorado Avalanche Jonas Johansson	To Buffalo Sabres 6th-round pick in 2021
March 24, 2021	To Anaheim Ducks Alexander Volkov	To Tampa Bay Lightning Antoine Morand conditional 7th-round pick in 2023 or 7th-round pick in 2024
March 26, 2021	To Montreal Canadiens Eric Staal*	To Buffalo Sabres 3rd-round pick in 2021; 5th-round pick in 2021
March 27, 2021	To Los Angeles Kings Brendan Lemieux	To New York Rangers 4th-round pick in 2021
March 29, 2021	To Ottawa Senators Michael Amadio	To Los Angeles Kings Christian Wolanin

=== April ===
April 2, 2021	To Chicago Blackhawks Vinnie Hinostroza	To Florida Panthers Brad Morrison
April 7, 2021	To New York Islanders Travis Zajac*; Kyle Palmieri*	To New Jersey Devils A. J. Greer; Mason Jobst; 1st-round pick in 2021 conditional 3rd-round pick in 2022 or 3rd-round pick in 2023 or 4th-round pick in 2022
April 8, 2021	To Chicago Blackhawks Brett Connolly; Henrik Borgstrom; Riley Stillman; 7th-round pick in 2021	To Florida Panthers Lucas Wallmark; Lucas Carlsson
April 9, 2021	To Toronto Maple Leafs Riley Nash	To Columbus Blue Jackets conditional 6th-round pick in 2022 or 7th-round pick in 2022
April 9, 2021	To Colorado Avalanche Patrik Nemeth*	To Detroit Red Wings 4th-round pick in 2022
April 10, 2021	To Florida Panthers Brandon Montour	To Buffalo Sabres 3rd-round pick in 2021
April 10, 2021	To Colorado Avalanche Devan Dubnyk	To San Jose Sharks Greg Pateryn; 5th-round pick in 2021
April 10, 2021	To Detroit Red Wings David Savard*	To Columbus Blue Jackets Brian Lashoff
April 10, 2021	To Tampa Bay Lightning David Savard*	To Detroit Red Wings 4th-round pick in 2021
April 10, 2021	To Tampa Bay Lightning Brian Lashoff	To Columbus Blue Jackets 1st-round pick in 2021; 3rd-round pick in 2022
April 11, 2021	To New Jersey Devils Jonas Siegenthaler	To Washington Capitals conditional ARI 3rd-round pick in 2021 or NJD 3rd-round pick in 2021
April 11, 2021	To Montreal Canadiens Jon Merrill	To Detroit Red Wings Hayden Verbeek; OTT 5th-round pick in 2021
April 11, 2021	To San Jose Sharks Nick Foligno*	To Columbus Blue Jackets Stefan Noesen
April 11, 2021	To Toronto Maple Leafs Nick Foligno*	To San Jose Sharks 4th-round pick in 2021
April 11, 2021	To Toronto Maple Leafs Stefan Noesen	To Columbus Blue Jackets 1st-round pick in 2021; 4th-round pick in 2022
April 11, 2021	To Boston Bruins Mike Reilly	To Ottawa Senators 3rd-round pick in 2022
April 11, 2021	To Toronto Maple Leafs David Rittich*	To Calgary Flames 3rd-round pick in 2022
April 11, 2021	To New York Islanders Braydon Coburn	To Ottawa Senators 7th-round pick in 2022
April 12, 2021	To Boston Bruins Taylor Hall*; Curtis Lazar	To Buffalo Sabres Anders Bjork; 2nd-round pick in 2021
April 12, 2021	To Pittsburgh Penguins Jeff Carter*	To Los Angeles Kings conditional 2nd-round pick in 2022 or 3rd-round pick in 2022 conditional 3rd-round pick in 2023 or 4th-round pick in 2023
April 12, 2021	To Chicago Blackhawks Adam Gaudette	To Vancouver Canucks Matthew Highmore
April 12, 2021	To Tampa Bay Lightning Fredrik Claesson	To San Jose Sharks Magnus Chrona
April 12, 2021	To Edmonton Oilers Dmitri Kulikov	To New Jersey Devils conditional 3rd-round pick in 2022 or 4th-round pick in 2022
April 12, 2021	To Colorado Avalanche Carl Soderberg	To Chicago Blackhawks Josh Dickinson; Ryder Rolston
April 12, 2021	To Montreal Canadiens Erik Gustafsson*	To Philadelphia Flyers STL 7th-round pick in 2022
April 12, 2021	To Florida Panthers Sam Bennett; 6th-round pick in 2022	To Calgary Flames Emil Heineman; 2nd-round pick in 2022
April 12, 2021	To San Jose Sharks Mattias Janmark*	To Chicago Blackhawks Nick DeSimone
April 12, 2021	To Vegas Golden Knights Mattias Janmark*	To San Jose Sharks BUF 5th-round pick in 2022
April 12, 2021	To Vegas Golden Knights Nick DeSimone; 5th-round pick in 2022	To Chicago Blackhawks 2nd-round pick in 2021; 3rd-round pick in 2022
April 12, 2021	To Toronto Maple Leafs Ben Hutton	To Anaheim Ducks 5th-round pick in 2022
April 12, 2021	To Nashville Predators Erik Gudbranson	To Ottawa Senators Brandon Fortunato; 7th-round pick in 2023
April 12, 2021	To Toronto Maple Leafs Antti Suomela	To San Jose Sharks Alexander Barabanov
April 12, 2021	To Anaheim Ducks Haydn Fleury	To Carolina Hurricanes Jani Hakanpaa; 6th-round pick in 2022
April 12, 2021	To Winnipeg Jets Jordie Benn	To Vancouver Canucks 6th-round pick in 2021
April 12, 2021	To Vancouver Canucks Madison Bowey; 5th-round pick in 2021	To Chicago Blackhawks 4th-round pick in 2021
April 12, 2021	To Washington Capitals Michael Raffl*	To Philadelphia Flyers VGK 5th-round pick in 2021
April 12, 2021	To Washington Capitals Anthony Mantha	To Detroit Red Wings Jakub Vrana; Richard Panik; 1st-round pick in 2021; 2nd-round pick in 2022

=== July ===
July 1, 2021	To Los Angeles Kings Viktor Arvidsson	To Nashville Predators 2nd-round pick in 2021; 3rd-round pick in 2022
July 12, 2021	To Edmonton Oilers Duncan Keith; Tim Soderlund	To Chicago Blackhawks Caleb Jones conditional 2nd-round pick in 2022 or 3rd-round pick in 2022
July 14, 2021	To Carolina Hurricanes Dylan Wells	To Edmonton Oilers future considerations
July 15, 2021	To New Jersey Devils Ryan Graves	To Colorado Avalanche Mikhail Maltsev; NYI 2nd-round pick in 2021
July 16, 2021	To Detroit Red Wings Nick Leddy	To New York Islanders Richard Panik*; EDM 2nd-round pick in 2021
July 17, 2021	To San Jose Sharks Adin Hill; 7th-round pick in 2022	To Arizona Coyotes Josef Korenar; 2nd-round pick in 2022
July 17, 2021	To Vancouver Canucks Jason Dickinson	To Dallas Stars 3rd-round pick in 2021
July 17, 2021	To Toronto Maple Leafs Jared McCann	To Pittsburgh Penguins Filip Hallander; 7th-round pick in 2023
July 17, 2021	To Philadelphia Flyers Ryan Ellis	To Nashville Predators Philippe Myers; Nolan Patrick
July 17, 2021	To Nashville Predators Cody Glass	To Vegas Golden Knights Nolan Patrick
July 17, 2021	To Vegas Golden Knights Brett Howden	To New York Rangers Nick DeSimone; WPG 4th-round pick in 2022
July 17, 2021	To New York Rangers Barclay Goodrow	To Tampa Bay Lightning 7th-round pick in 2022
July 17, 2021	To Arizona Coyotes Andrew Ladd; COL 2nd-round pick in 2021 conditional COL 2nd-round pick in 2022 or NYI 2nd-round pick in 2022 conditional 3rd-round pick in 2023	To New York Islanders future considerations
July 22, 2021	To Detroit Red Wings Alex Nedeljkovic	To Carolina Hurricanes Jonathan Bernier; VGK 3rd-round pick in 2021
July 22, 2021	To Arizona Coyotes Shayne Gostisbehere; 2nd-round pick in 2022; STL 7th-round pick in 2022	To Philadelphia Flyers future considerations
July 22, 2021	To Calgary Flames Tyler Pitlick	To Seattle Kraken 4th-round pick in 2022

== Waivers ==
Once an NHL player has played in a certain number of games or a set number of seasons has passed since the signing of his first NHL contract (see here), that player must be offered to all of the other NHL teams before he can be assigned to a minor league affiliate.

Date	Player	New team	Previous team	Ref
January 9, 2021	Christian Djoos	Detroit Red Wings	Anaheim Ducks	
January 9, 2021	Gustav Forsling	Florida Panthers	Carolina Hurricanes	
January 11, 2021	Noah Juulsen	Florida Panthers	Montreal Canadiens	
January 12, 2021	Rudolfs Balcers	San Jose Sharks	Ottawa Senators	
January 12, 2021	Eric Comrie	New Jersey Devils	Winnipeg Jets	
January 12, 2021	Anton Forsberg	Carolina Hurricanes	Edmonton Oilers	
January 12, 2021	Luca Sbisa	Nashville Predators	Winnipeg Jets	
January 15, 2021	Anton Forsberg	Winnipeg Jets	Carolina Hurricanes	
January 16, 2021	Troy Grosenick	Edmonton Oilers	Los Angeles Kings	
January 18, 2021	Aaron Dell	New Jersey Devils	Toronto Maple Leafs	
February 6, 2021	Troy Grosenick	Los Angeles Kings	Edmonton Oilers	
February 18, 2021	Eric Comrie	Winnipeg Jets	New Jersey Devils	
February 24, 2021	Mark Friedman	Pittsburgh Penguins	Philadelphia Flyers	
February 27, 2021	Jarred Tinordi	Boston Bruins	Nashville Predators	
March 1, 2021	Alex Stalock	Edmonton Oilers	Minnesota Wild	
March 17, 2021	Anton Forsberg	Ottawa Senators	Winnipeg Jets	
March 17, 2021	Jimmy Vesey	Vancouver Canucks	Toronto Maple Leafs	
March 22, 2021	Travis Boyd	Vancouver Canucks	Toronto Maple Leafs	
April 9, 2021	Drake Caggiula	Buffalo Sabres	Arizona Coyotes	
April 12, 2021	Victor Mete	Ottawa Senators	Montreal Canadiens	
April 12, 2021	Sami Vatanen	Dallas Stars	New Jersey Devils	

== Expansion draft ==
The 2020–21 season saw the entrance of a 32nd team to the league, the Seattle Kraken. While Seattle did not begin to play until the 2021–22 NHL season, the team was active and allowed to make trades and sign free agents on April 30, 2021, after sending its final expansion payment to the NHL. To create a roster, an expansion draft was held on July 21.

Seattle followed the same rules for this draft as the Vegas Golden Knights in 2017, with the provision that Vegas was exempted from losing a player in the draft. Thus, Seattle was required to select one player from each of the other 30 existing teams, for a total of 30 players selected. At least 20 of the players selected had to be contracted for the 2021–22 season and Seattle is to take a minimum number of players at each position. Each of the thirty other teams are allowed to protect up to 11 players, but also had to expose a minimum number of players with NHL experience for Seattle to select at each position. Teams are required to protect players with no-movement clauses (or the player must waive it); all first- and second-year professionals, as well as all unsigned draft choices, and players determined to have career-ending injuries are exempt from selection and will not be counted toward their teams' protection limits.

On July 17, the 30 teams excluding Vegas submitted their expansion protection lists and they were published the next day. Seattle had from July 18 to 21 to negotiate with all exposed free agents; if Seattle came to terms with a player within this window, that player was counted as their previous team's expansion selection and Seattle was unable to select another player from that team. On July 21, Seattle's final roster was submitted and it was announced later that evening. Any players picked by Seattle cannot have their contracts bought out by the Kraken until the summer after the 2021–22 season.

== See also ==
- 2020 NHL entry draft
- 2021 NHL entry draft
- 2020 in ice hockey
- 2021 in ice hockey
- 2019–20 NHL transactions
- 2021–22 NHL transactions
