= 2021–22 NHL transactions =

The following is a list of all team-to-team transactions that have occurred in the National Hockey League during the 2021–22 NHL season. It lists which team each player has been traded to, signed by, or claimed by, and for which player(s) or draft pick(s), if applicable. Players who have retired or that have had their contracts terminated are also listed. The 2021–22 NHL trade deadline was on March 21, 2022. Players traded or claimed off waivers after this date were not eligible to play in the 2022 Stanley Cup playoffs.

== Retirement ==
Date	Player	Last Team	Ref
July 25, 2021	Niklas Hjalmarsson	Arizona Coyotes	
August 8, 2021	Anders Nilsson	Tampa Bay Lightning	
August 20, 2021	Henrik Lundqvist	Washington Capitals	
September 9, 2021	David Backes	Anaheim Ducks	
September 17, 2021	Zack Smith	Chicago Blackhawks	
September 20, 2021	Travis Zajac	New York Islanders	
September 24, 2021	Curtis McElhinney	Tampa Bay Lightning	
November 4, 2021	Marian Gaborik	Tampa Bay Lightning	
November 12, 2021	Braydon Coburn	New York Islanders	
January 11, 2022	Nate Prosser	Philadelphia Flyers	
February 9, 2022	Tuukka Rask	Boston Bruins	
April 24, 2022	Ryan Getzlaf^{1}	Anaheim Ducks	
May 3, 2022	Samuel Morin	Philadelphia Flyers	
May 10, 2022	Patrick Marleau	San Jose Sharks	
May 14, 2022	Dustin Brown^{2}	Los Angeles Kings	
May 24, 2022	Frans Nielsen	Detroit Red Wings	
May 29, 2022	Jason Spezza	Toronto Maple Leafs	
June 14, 2022	Carter Hutton	Toronto Maple Leafs	

1. Getzlaf announced on April 4, 2022 that he would retire at the conclusion of the season; the Ducks played their final home game of the year on April 24, 2022, while Getzlaf was scratched for the Ducks' two road games afterwards.
2. Brown announced on April 28, 2022 that he would retire at the conclusion of the season; the Kings were eliminated from the 2022 Stanley Cup playoffs on May 14, 2022.

== Contract terminations ==
A team and player may mutually agree to terminate a player's contract at any time. All players must clear waivers before having a contract terminated.

Buyouts can only occur at specific times of the year. For more details on contract terminations as buyouts:

Teams may buy out player contracts (after the conclusion of a season) for a portion of the remaining value of the contract, paid over a period of twice the remaining length of the contract. This reduced number and extended period is applied to the cap hit as well.

- If the player was under the age of 26 at the time of the buyout the player's pay and cap hit will reduced by a factor of 2/3 over the extended period.
- If the player was 26 or older at the time of the buyout the player's pay and cap hit will reduced by a factor of 1/3 over the extended period.
- If the player was 35 or older at the time of signing the contract the player's pay will be reduced by a factor of 1/3, but the cap hit will not be reduced over the extended period.

Injured players cannot be bought out.

Date	Player	Previous team	Notes	Ref
July 24, 2021	Tony DeAngelo	New York Rangers	Buyout	
July 24, 2021	Lean Bergmann	San Jose Sharks	Mutual termination	
July 26, 2021	Jake Virtanen	Vancouver Canucks	Buyout	
July 28, 2021	Braden Holtby	Vancouver Canucks	Buyout	
July 28, 2021	Martin Jones	San Jose Sharks	Buyout	
July 28, 2021	James Neal	Edmonton Oilers	Buyout	
August 19, 2021	Mikael Hakkarainen	Vegas Golden Knights	Mutual termination	
August 20, 2021	Frans Nielsen	Detroit Red Wings	Buyout	
August 31, 2021	Ivan Chekhovich	San Jose Sharks	Mutual termination	
September 12, 2021	Vladislav Kotkov	San Jose Sharks	Mutual termination	
September 14, 2021	Joona Luoto	Winnipeg Jets	Mutual termination	
September 21, 2021	Sami Niku	Winnipeg Jets	Mutual termination	
October 13, 2021	Matej Chalupa	Chicago Blackhawks	Mutual termination	
October 13, 2021	Mikko Lehtonen	Columbus Blue Jackets	Termination	
October 19, 2021	Kirill Maksimov	Edmonton Oilers	Mutual termination	
October 19, 2021	Dmytro Timashov	New York Islanders	Mutual termination	
October 26, 2021	Alexander Volkov	Anaheim Ducks	Mutual termination	
November 14, 2021	Leo Komarov	New York Islanders	Mutual termination	
November 22, 2021	Eric Gelinas	Carolina Hurricanes	Mutual termination	
November 22, 2021	Ivan Lodnia	Minnesota Wild	Termination	
November 25, 2021	Patrick Harper	Nashville Predators	Mutual termination	
December 2, 2021	Kirill Semyonov	Toronto Maple Leafs	Mutual termination	
December 6, 2021	Pontus Aberg	Ottawa Senators	Mutual termination	
December 9, 2021	Anatolii Golyshev	New York Islanders	Mutual termination	
December 10, 2021	Arsen Khisamutdinov	Montreal Canadiens	Mutual termination	
December 15, 2021	Joel Kellman	San Jose Sharks	Mutual termination	
December 16, 2021	Andreas Borgman	Dallas Stars	Termination	
December 19, 2021	Vladislav Provolnev	Arizona Coyotes	Mutual termination	
January 9, 2022	Evander Kane	San Jose Sharks	Termination	
January 14, 2022	Gregory Hofmann	Columbus Blue Jackets	Mutual termination	
January 22, 2022	Tim Soderlund	Edmonton Oilers	Mutual termination	
March 24, 2022	Christian Jaros	New Jersey Devils	Mutual termination	
May 27, 2022	Dmitri Zavgorodny	Calgary Flames	Mutual termination	
June 9, 2022	Ilya Konovalov	Edmonton Oilers	Mutual termination	
July 2, 2022	Amir Miftakhov	Tampa Bay Lightning	Mutual termination	
July 3, 2022	Matt Tennyson	Nashville Predators	Mutual termination	
July 6, 2022	Colin White	Ottawa Senators	Buyout	

== Free agency ==
Note: This does not include players who have re-signed with their previous team as an unrestricted free agent or as a restricted free agent.

Date	Player	New team	Previous team	Ref
July 28, 2021	Blake Coleman	Calgary Flames	Tampa Bay Lightning	
July 28, 2021	Frederik Andersen	Carolina Hurricanes	Toronto Maple Leafs	
July 28, 2021	Zach Hyman	Edmonton Oilers	Toronto Maple Leafs	
July 28, 2021	Ryan Suter	Dallas Stars	Minnesota Wild	
July 28, 2021	Brian Elliott	Tampa Bay Lightning	Philadelphia Flyers	
July 28, 2021	Antti Raanta	Carolina Hurricanes	Arizona Coyotes	
July 28, 2021	Alexander Wennberg	Seattle Kraken	Florida Panthers	
July 28, 2021	Luke Glendening	Dallas Stars	Detroit Red Wings	
July 28, 2021	Andreas Borgman	Dallas Stars	Tampa Bay Lightning	
July 28, 2021	Tucker Poolman	Vancouver Canucks	Winnipeg Jets	
July 28, 2021	Alex Goligoski	Minnesota Wild	Arizona Coyotes	
July 28, 2021	Jaroslav Halak	Vancouver Canucks	Boston Bruins	
July 28, 2021	Derek Forbort	Boston Bruins	Winnipeg Jets	
July 28, 2021	David Savard	Montreal Canadiens	Tampa Bay Lightning	
July 28, 2021	Zach Bogosian	Tampa Bay Lightning	Toronto Maple Leafs	
July 28, 2021	Braden Holtby	Dallas Stars	Vancouver Canucks	
July 28, 2021	Martin Jones	Philadelphia Flyers	San Jose Sharks	
July 28, 2021	Andrew Cogliano	San Jose Sharks	Dallas Stars	
July 28, 2021	Dominik Simon	Pittsburgh Penguins	Calgary Flames	
July 28, 2021	Louie Belpedio	Montreal Canadiens	Minnesota Wild	
July 28, 2021	Cedric Paquette	Montreal Canadiens	Carolina Hurricanes	
July 28, 2021	Laurent Brossoit	Vegas Golden Knights	Winnipeg Jets	
July 28, 2021	Petr Mrazek	Toronto Maple Leafs	Carolina Hurricanes	
July 28, 2021	Michael Bunting	Toronto Maple Leafs	Arizona Coyotes	
July 28, 2021	Sean Kuraly	Columbus Blue Jackets	Boston Bruins	
July 28, 2021	Cody Ceci	Edmonton Oilers	Pittsburgh Penguins	
July 28, 2021	Nick Bonino	San Jose Sharks	Minnesota Wild	
July 28, 2021	Jean-Sebastien Dea	Montreal Canadiens	Buffalo Sabres	
July 28, 2021	Patrik Nemeth	New York Rangers	Colorado Avalanche	
July 28, 2021	Keith Yandle	Philadelphia Flyers	Florida Panthers	
July 28, 2021	James Reimer	San Jose Sharks	Carolina Hurricanes	
July 28, 2021	Brady Keeper	Vancouver Canucks	Florida Panthers	
July 28, 2021	Jarred Tinordi	New York Rangers	Boston Bruins	
July 28, 2021	Jonathan Bernier	New Jersey Devils	Carolina Hurricanes	
July 28, 2021	Alex Petrovic	Dallas Stars	Calgary Flames	
July 28, 2021	Michael Amadio	Toronto Maple Leafs	Ottawa Senators	
July 28, 2021	Nate Thompson	Philadelphia Flyers	Winnipeg Jets	
July 28, 2021	Frederick Gaudreau	Minnesota Wild	Pittsburgh Penguins	
July 28, 2021	Sven Baertschi	Vegas Golden Knights	Vancouver Canucks	
July 28, 2021	Charles Hudon	Tampa Bay Lightning	Montreal Canadiens	
July 28, 2021	Roland McKeown	Colorado Avalanche	Carolina Hurricanes	
July 28, 2021	Luke Schenn	Vancouver Canucks	Tampa Bay Lightning	
July 28, 2021	Ian Cole	Carolina Hurricanes	Minnesota Wild	
July 28, 2021	Carter Hutton	Arizona Coyotes	Buffalo Sabres	
July 28, 2021	Gabriel Dumont	Tampa Bay Lightning	Minnesota Wild	
July 28, 2021	Michael Del Zotto	Ottawa Senators	Columbus Blue Jackets	
July 28, 2021	Maxime Lagace	Tampa Bay Lightning	Pittsburgh Penguins	
July 28, 2021	Darren Raddysh	Tampa Bay Lightning	New York Rangers	
July 28, 2021	Jujhar Khaira	Chicago Blackhawks	Edmonton Oilers	
July 28, 2021	David Rittich	Nashville Predators	Toronto Maple Leafs	
July 28, 2021	Josh Leivo	Carolina Hurricanes	Calgary Flames	
July 28, 2021	Philipp Grubauer	Seattle Kraken	Colorado Avalanche	
July 28, 2021	Phillip Danault	Los Angeles Kings	Montreal Canadiens	
July 28, 2021	Brock McGinn	Pittsburgh Penguins	Carolina Hurricanes	
July 28, 2021	Nic Petan	Vancouver Canucks	Toronto Maple Leafs	
July 28, 2021	Jake McCabe	Chicago Blackhawks	Buffalo Sabres	
July 28, 2021	Chase De Leo	New Jersey Devils	Anaheim Ducks	
July 28, 2021	Jaden Schwartz	Seattle Kraken	St. Louis Blues	
July 28, 2021	Andrew Agozzino	Ottawa Senators	Anaheim Ducks	
July 28, 2021	Greg McKegg	New York Rangers	Boston Bruins	
July 28, 2021	Erik Haula	Boston Bruins	Nashville Predators	
July 28, 2021	Alexander Edler	Los Angeles Kings	Vancouver Canucks	
July 28, 2021	Dryden Hunt	New York Rangers	Arizona Coyotes	
July 28, 2021	Tomas Nosek	Boston Bruins	Vegas Golden Knights	
July 28, 2021	Joe Hicketts	Minnesota Wild	Detroit Red Wings	
July 28, 2021	Vinnie Hinostroza	Buffalo Sabres	Chicago Blackhawks	
July 28, 2021	Matt Luff	Nashville Predators	Los Angeles Kings	
July 28, 2021	Phillip Di Giuseppe	Vancouver Canucks	New York Rangers	
July 28, 2021	Tony DeAngelo	Carolina Hurricanes	New York Rangers	
July 28, 2021	Pierre-Edouard Bellemare	Tampa Bay Lightning	Colorado Avalanche	
July 28, 2021	Kurtis Gabriel	Toronto Maple Leafs	San Jose Sharks	
July 28, 2021	David Kampf	Toronto Maple Leafs	Chicago Blackhawks	
July 28, 2021	Gavin Bayreuther	Columbus Blue Jackets	Seattle Kraken	
July 28, 2021	Trevor Lewis	Calgary Flames	Winnipeg Jets	
July 28, 2021	Filip Lindberg	Pittsburgh Penguins	Minnesota Wild	
July 28, 2021	Sheldon Dries	Vancouver Canucks	Colorado Avalanche	
July 28, 2021	Ryan Dzingel	Arizona Coyotes	Ottawa Senators	
July 28, 2021	Jordan Oesterle	Detroit Red Wings	Arizona Coyotes	
July 28, 2021	Liam O'Brien	Arizona Coyotes	Colorado Avalanche	
July 28, 2021	Dominic Turgeon	Minnesota Wild	Detroit Red Wings	
July 28, 2021	Alex Biega	Toronto Maple Leafs	Detroit Red Wings	
July 28, 2021	Carl Dahlstrom	Toronto Maple Leafs	Vegas Golden Knights	
July 28, 2021	Matt Tennyson	Nashville Predators	New Jersey Devils	
July 28, 2021	Mike Hoffman	Montreal Canadiens	St. Louis Blues	
July 28, 2021	Dougie Hamilton	New Jersey Devils	Carolina Hurricanes	
July 28, 2021	T.J. Tynan	Los Angeles Kings	Colorado Avalanche	
July 28, 2021	C.J. Smith	Carolina Hurricanes	Buffalo Sabres	
July 28, 2021	Pius Suter	Detroit Red Wings	Chicago Blackhawks	
July 28, 2021	Michael Eyssimont	Winnipeg Jets	Los Angeles Kings	
July 28, 2021	Luke Johnson	Winnipeg Jets	Minnesota Wild	
July 28, 2021	Matt Irwin	Washington Capitals	Buffalo Sabres	
July 28, 2021	Dylan McIlrath	Washington Capitals	Detroit Red Wings	
July 28, 2021	Linus Ullmark	Boston Bruins	Buffalo Sabres	
July 28, 2021	Justin Dowling	Vancouver Canucks	Dallas Stars	
July 28, 2021	Brad Hunt	Vancouver Canucks	Minnesota Wild	
July 28, 2021	Kyle Burroughs	Vancouver Canucks	Colorado Avalanche	
July 28, 2021	Sheldon Rempal	Vancouver Canucks	Carolina Hurricanes	
July 28, 2021	Sean Malone	Buffalo Sabres	Nashville Predators	
July 28, 2021	Troy Grosenick	Boston Bruins	Los Angeles Kings	
July 28, 2021	Mark Pysyk	Buffalo Sabres	Dallas Stars	
July 28, 2021	Brogan Rafferty	Anaheim Ducks	Vancouver Canucks	
July 28, 2021	Derek Ryan	Edmonton Oilers	Calgary Flames	
July 28, 2021	Adam Clendening	Philadelphia Flyers	Columbus Blue Jackets	
July 28, 2021	Gerald Mayhew	Philadelphia Flyers	Minnesota Wild	
July 28, 2021	Nick Seeler	Philadelphia Flyers	Chicago Blackhawks	
July 28, 2021	Jimmy Schuldt	Buffalo Sabres	Vegas Golden Knights	
July 28, 2021	Nick DeSimone	Calgary Flames	New York Rangers	
July 28, 2021	Adam Werner	Calgary Flames	Colorado Avalanche	
July 28, 2021	Taylor Fedun	Pittsburgh Penguins	Dallas Stars	
July 28, 2021	Nick Foligno	Boston Bruins	Toronto Maple Leafs	
July 28, 2021	Christopher Gibson	Florida Panthers	Tampa Bay Lightning	
July 28, 2021	Steven Fogarty	Boston Bruins	Buffalo Sabres	
July 28, 2021	Tyler Lewington	Boston Bruins	Nashville Predators	
July 28, 2021	Dmitry Kulikov	Minnesota Wild	Edmonton Oilers	
July 28, 2021	Craig Anderson	Buffalo Sabres	Washington Capitals	
July 28, 2021	Aaron Dell	Buffalo Sabres	New Jersey Devils	
July 29, 2021	Ethan Prow	Buffalo Sabres	Florida Panthers	
July 29, 2021	Corey Perry	Tampa Bay Lightning	Montreal Canadiens	
July 29, 2021	Michael Chaput	Pittsburgh Penguins	Arizona Coyotes	
July 29, 2021	Matthew Peca	St. Louis Blues	Ottawa Senators	
July 29, 2021	Brandon Saad	St. Louis Blues	Colorado Avalanche	
July 29, 2021	Michael Raffl	Dallas Stars	Washington Capitals	
July 29, 2021	Jani Hakanpaa	Dallas Stars	Carolina Hurricanes	
July 29, 2021	John Hayden	Buffalo Sabres	Arizona Coyotes	
July 29, 2021	Darren Helm	Colorado Avalanche	Detroit Red Wings	
July 29, 2021	Charlie Lindgren	St. Louis Blues	Montreal Canadiens	
July 29, 2021	Brett Seney	Toronto Maple Leafs	New Jersey Devils	
July 29, 2021	Greg Pateryn	Anaheim Ducks	San Jose Sharks	
July 29, 2021	Pontus Aberg	Ottawa Senators	Pittsburgh Penguins	
July 29, 2021	Kole Sherwood	Ottawa Senators	Columbus Blue Jackets	
July 29, 2021	Brendan Smith	Carolina Hurricanes	New York Rangers	
July 29, 2021	Andy Welinski	Calgary Flames	Anaheim Ducks	
July 29, 2021	Mathieu Perreault	Montreal Canadiens	Winnipeg Jets	
July 29, 2021	Joe Gambardella	New Jersey Devils	Edmonton Oilers	
July 29, 2021	Danny O'Regan	Anaheim Ducks	Vegas Golden Knights	
July 29, 2021	Buddy Robinson	Anaheim Ducks	Calgary Flames	
July 29, 2021	Jalen Chatfield	Carolina Hurricanes	Vancouver Canucks	
July 29, 2021	Stefan Matteau	Colorado Avalanche	Columbus Blue Jackets	
July 29, 2021	Dylan Sikura	Colorado Avalanche	Vegas Golden Knights	
July 29, 2021	Dan Renouf	Detroit Red Wings	Colorado Avalanche	
July 29, 2021	Luke Witkowski	Detroit Red Wings	Tampa Bay Lightning	
July 29, 2021	Kevin Czuczman	Minnesota Wild	Pittsburgh Penguins	
July 29, 2021	Jon Merrill	Minnesota Wild	Montreal Canadiens	
July 29, 2021	Danton Heinen	Pittsburgh Penguins	Anaheim Ducks	
July 29, 2021	Michael Carcone	Arizona Coyotes	Nashville Predators	
July 30, 2021	Ryan MacInnis	Buffalo Sabres	Columbus Blue Jackets	
July 30, 2021	Calle Rosen	St. Louis Blues	Toronto Maple Leafs	
July 30, 2021	Tommy Cross	St. Louis Blues	Florida Panthers	
July 30, 2021	Sam Miletic	Carolina Hurricanes	Pittsburgh Penguins	
July 30, 2021	Zac Dalpe	Florida Panthers	Columbus Blue Jackets	
July 30, 2021	Brian Lashoff	Detroit Red Wings	Tampa Bay Lightning	
July 30, 2021	Maxim Letunov	Carolina Hurricanes	San Jose Sharks	
July 30, 2021	Alex Lyon	Carolina Hurricanes	Philadelphia Flyers	
July 30, 2021	Ondrej Kase	Toronto Maple Leafs	Boston Bruins	
July 31, 2021	Nick Ritchie	Toronto Maple Leafs	Boston Bruins	
July 31, 2021	Stefan Noesen	Carolina Hurricanes	Toronto Maple Leafs	
July 31, 2021	Derek Stepan	Carolina Hurricanes	Ottawa Senators	
July 31, 2021	Jordan Gross	Colorado Avalanche	Arizona Coyotes	
July 31, 2021	Riley Nash	Winnipeg Jets	Toronto Maple Leafs	
July 31, 2021	Austin Poganski	Winnipeg Jets	St. Louis Blues	
August 2, 2021	Ryan Murray	Colorado Avalanche	New Jersey Devils	
August 3, 2021	Travis Boyd	Arizona Coyotes	Vancouver Canucks	
August 4, 2021	Josh Jacobs	Carolina Hurricanes	New Jersey Devils	
August 4, 2021	Connor Carrick	Seattle Kraken	New Jersey Devils	
August 5, 2021	Mike Vecchione	Washington Capitals	Colorado Avalanche	
August 5, 2021	Tomas Tatar	New Jersey Devils	Montreal Canadiens	
August 6, 2021	Marcus Johansson	Seattle Kraken	Minnesota Wild	
August 11, 2021	Andrew Poturalski	Carolina Hurricanes	Anaheim Ducks	
August 13, 2021	Joe Thornton	Florida Panthers	Toronto Maple Leafs	
August 13, 2021	Zac Rinaldo	Columbus Blue Jackets	Calgary Flames	
August 17, 2021	Scott Sabourin	Ottawa Senators	Toronto Maple Leafs	
August 20, 2021	Antoine Bibeau	Seattle Kraken	Carolina Hurricanes	
August 25, 2021	Derick Brassard	Philadelphia Flyers	Arizona Coyotes	
August 25, 2021	Gustav Olofsson	Seattle Kraken	Montreal Canadiens	
August 27, 2021	Jordie Benn	Minnesota Wild	Winnipeg Jets	
September 1, 2021	Riley Sheahan	Seattle Kraken	Buffalo Sabres	
September 2, 2021	Carter Rowney	Detroit Red Wings	Anaheim Ducks	
September 2, 2021	Louis Domingue	Pittsburgh Penguins	Calgary Flames	
September 8, 2021	Brad Richardson	Calgary Flames	Nashville Predators	
September 10, 2021	Zach Parise	New York Islanders	Minnesota Wild	
September 10, 2021	Erik Gudbranson	Calgary Flames	Nashville Predators	
September 13, 2021	Ryan Donato	Seattle Kraken	San Jose Sharks	
September 16, 2021	Andy Andreoff	New York Islanders	Philadelphia Flyers	
September 16, 2021	Paul LaDue	New York Islanders	Washington Capitals	
September 18, 2021	Zdeno Chara	New York Islanders	Washington Capitals	
September 24, 2021	Sami Niku	Montreal Canadiens	Winnipeg Jets	
September 29, 2021	Max McCormick	Seattle Kraken	Carolina Hurricanes	
October 6, 2021	Alex Galchenyuk	Arizona Coyotes	Toronto Maple Leafs	
October 7, 2021	Tyler Ennis	Ottawa Senators	Edmonton Oilers	
October 8, 2021	Frederik Gauthier	New Jersey Devils	Arizona Coyotes	
October 9, 2021	James Neal	St. Louis Blues	Edmonton Oilers	
October 10, 2021	Jack Johnson	Colorado Avalanche	New York Rangers	
October 10, 2021	Jimmy Vesey	New Jersey Devils	Vancouver Canucks	
October 10, 2021	Erik Gustafsson	Chicago Blackhawks	Montreal Canadiens	
October 12, 2021	Brian Boyle	Pittsburgh Penguins	Florida Panthers	
October 12, 2021	Alex Chiasson	Vancouver Canucks	Edmonton Oilers	
October 13, 2021	Colton Sceviour	Edmonton Oilers	Pittsburgh Penguins	
October 13, 2021	Evgeny Svechnikov	Winnipeg Jets	Detroit Red Wings	
October 28, 2021	Ben Hutton	Vegas Golden Knights	Toronto Maple Leafs	
January 27, 2022	Evander Kane	Edmonton Oilers	San Jose Sharks	

=== Offer sheets ===
An offer sheet is a contract offered to a restricted free agent by a team other than the one for which his rights are owned by. If the player signs the offer sheet, his current team has seven days to match the contract offer and keep the player or else he goes to the team that gave the offer sheet, with compensation going to his originally owning team.

Date Offered	Player	Original Team	Offering Team	Contract Offered	Date Resolved	Result	Compensation	Ref
August 28, 2021	Jesperi Kotkaniemi	Montreal Canadiens	Carolina Hurricanes	1 year $6,100,035	September 4, 2021	not matched	1st-round pick in 2022; 3rd-round pick in 2022	

=== Imports ===
This section is for players who were not previously on contract with NHL teams in the past season. Listed is the last team and league they were under contract with.

Date	Player	New team	Previous team	League	Ref
July 28, 2021	Andreas Wingerli	Colorado Avalanche	Skelleftea AIK	SHL	
July 28, 2021	Eric Gelinas	Carolina Hurricanes	Rogle BK	SHL	
July 28, 2021	Jesper Froden	Boston Bruins	Skelleftea AIK	SHL	
July 28, 2021	Jakub Pour	Chicago Blackhawks	HC Skoda Plzen	ELH	
July 28, 2021	Chris Wideman	Montreal Canadiens	Torpedo Nizhny Novgorod	KHL	
July 28, 2021	Andrej Sustr	Tampa Bay Lightning	HC Kunlun Red Star	KHL	
July 28, 2021	Dmitri Jaskin	Arizona Coyotes	HC Dynamo Moscow	KHL	
July 28, 2021	Jon Lizotte	Minnesota Wild	Wilkes-Barre/Scranton Penguins	AHL	
July 28, 2021	Ryan Murphy	Detroit Red Wings	Henderson Silver Knights	AHL	
July 28, 2021	Tyler Sikura	Columbus Blue Jackets	Cleveland Monsters	AHL	
July 28, 2021	Devante Stephens	Vancouver Canucks	Syracuse Crunch	AHL	
July 28, 2021	Garret Sparks	Los Angeles Kings	Stockton Heat	AHL	
July 28, 2021	Hunter Shepard	Washington Capitals	Hershey Bears	AHL	
July 28, 2021	John Stevens	Vancouver Canucks	Utica Comets	AHL	
July 28, 2021	Jaycob Megna	San Jose Sharks	San Jose Barracuda	AHL	
July 28, 2021	Ryan Fitzgerald	Philadelphia Flyers	Lehigh Valley Phantoms	AHL	
July 28, 2021	Cooper Zech	Philadelphia Flyers	Providence Bruins	AHL	
July 28, 2021	Remi Elie	Tampa Bay Lightning	Rochester Americans	AHL	
July 28, 2021	Kevin Gravel	Calgary Flames	Bakersfield Condors	AHL	
July 28, 2021	Brian Flynn	New Jersey Devils	HC Ambri-Piotta	NL	
July 28, 2021	Samuel Asselin	Boston Bruins	Providence Bruins	AHL	
July 29, 2021	Nathan Todd	St. Louis Blues	Manitoba Moose	AHL	
July 29, 2021	Pavel Gogolev	Toronto Maple Leafs	Toronto Marlies	AHL	
July 29, 2021	Dillon Heatherington	Ottawa Senators	Barys Nur-Sultan	KHL	
July 29, 2021	Robbie Russo	New Jersey Devils	San Jose Barracuda	AHL	
July 30, 2021	Brendan Gaunce	Columbus Blue Jackets	Vaxjo Lakers	SHL	
August 7, 2021	Brendan Perlini	Edmonton Oilers	HC Ambri-Piotta	NL	
September 22, 2021	J.R. Avon	Philadelphia Flyers	Peterborough Petes	OHL	
September 30, 2021	J-F Berube	Columbus Blue Jackets	Ontario Reign	AHL	
October 1, 2021	Braeden Kressler	Toronto Maple Leafs	Flint Firebirds	OHL	
October 4, 2021	Arber Xhekaj	Montreal Canadiens	Kitchener Rangers	OHL	
October 12, 2021	Anson Thornton	Arizona Coyotes	Sarnia Sting	OHL	
November 14, 2021	Zac Leslie	Ottawa Senators	Belleville Senators	AHL	
November 28, 2021	Mark Jankowski	Buffalo Sabres	Rochester Americans	AHL	
December 8, 2021	Jon Gillies	St. Louis Blues	Maine Mariners	ECHL	
December 16, 2021	Cal Burke	Colorado Avalanche	Colorado Eagles	AHL	
December 18, 2021	Ashton Sautner	Vancouver Canucks	Abbotsford Canucks	AHL	
December 31, 2021	Cale Morris	Chicago Blackhawks	Rockford IceHogs	AHL	
January 4, 2022	Zane McIntyre	Minnesota Wild	Lehigh Valley Phantoms	AHL	
January 12, 2022	Michael Houser	Buffalo Sabres	Rochester Americans	AHL	
January 14, 2022	Evan Fitzpatrick	Florida Panthers	Charlotte Checkers	AHL	
February 7, 2022	Mack Guzda	Florida Panthers	Barrie Colts	OHL	
February 10, 2022	Brad Malone	Edmonton Oilers	Bakersfield Condors	AHL	
February 20, 2022	Jet Greaves	Columbus Blue Jackets	Cleveland Monsters	AHL	
February 28, 2022	Petteri Lindbohm	Florida Panthers	Jokerit	KHL	
March 1, 2022	Bennett MacArthur	Tampa Bay Lightning	Acadie–Bathurst Titan	QMJHL	
March 1, 2022	Henry Rybinski	Washington Capitals	Seattle Thunderbirds	WHL	
March 1, 2022	Jordan Frasca	Pittsburgh Penguins	Kingston Frontenacs	OHL	
March 1, 2022	Taylor Gauthier	Pittsburgh Penguins	Portland Winterhawks	WHL	
March 1, 2022	Tye Kartye	Seattle Kraken	Sault Ste. Marie Greyhounds	OHL	
March 2, 2022	Vincent Desharnais	Edmonton Oilers	Bakersfield Condors	AHL	
March 2, 2022	James Hamblin	Edmonton Oilers	Bakersfield Condors	AHL	
March 7, 2022	Billy Sweezey	Columbus Blue Jackets	Cleveland Monsters	AHL	
March 9, 2022	Navrin Mutter	Nashville Predators	Kitchener Rangers	OHL	
March 10, 2022	Corey Andonovski	Pittsburgh Penguins	Princeton Tigers	NCAA	
March 11, 2022	Arshdeep Bains	Vancouver Canucks	Red Deer Rebels	WHL	
March 15, 2022	Marc McLaughlin	Boston Bruins	Boston College Eagles	NCAA	
March 16, 2022	Declan Carlile	Tampa Bay Lightning	Merrimack Warriors	NCAA	
March 17, 2022	Derrick Pouliot	Vegas Golden Knights	Henderson Silver Knights	AHL	
March 19, 2022	Taylor Ward	Los Angeles Kings	Omaha Mavericks	NCAA	
March 19, 2022	Philippe Desrosiers	Winnipeg Jets	Manitoba Moose	AHL	
March 19, 2022	Brandon Scanlin	New York Rangers	Omaha Mavericks	NCAA	
March 20, 2022	Ilya Usau	Tampa Bay Lightning	HC Dinamo Minsk	KHL	
March 20, 2022	Harri Sateri	Toronto Maple Leafs	HC Sibir Novosibirsk	KHL	
March 21, 2022	Hayden Hodgson	Philadelphia Flyers	Lehigh Valley Phantoms	AHL	
March 22, 2022	Curtis Douglas	Toronto Maple Leafs	Toronto Marlies	AHL	
March 23, 2022	Jaxson Stauber	Chicago Blackhawks	Providence Friars	NCAA	
March 27, 2022	Brian Halonen	New Jersey Devils	Michigan Tech Huskies	NCAA	
March 28, 2022	Clay Stevenson	Washington Capitals	Dartmouth Big Green	NCAA	
March 28, 2022	Colin Swoyer	Pittsburgh Penguins	Michigan Tech Huskies	NCAA	
March 28, 2022	Ryan Fanti	Edmonton Oilers	Minnesota Duluth Bulldogs	NCAA	
March 29, 2022	Ty Glover	Pittsburgh Penguins	Western Michigan Broncos	NCAA	
March 30, 2022	Brandon Bussi	Boston Bruins	Western Michigan Broncos	NCAA	
March 31, 2022	Lucas Condotta	Montreal Canadiens	UMass Lowell River Hawks	NCAA	
April 1, 2022	Bobby Trivigno	New York Rangers	UMass Minutemen	NCAA	
April 5, 2022	Noah Philp	Edmonton Oilers	Alberta Golden Bears	U Sports	
April 8, 2022	Max Ellis	Toronto Maple Leafs	Notre Dame Fighting Irish	NCAA	
April 8, 2022	Nick Blankenburg	Columbus Blue Jackets	Michigan Wolverines	NCAA	
April 9, 2022	Georgii Merkulov	Boston Bruins	Ohio State Buckeyes	NCAA	
April 11, 2022	Nick Cicek	San Jose Sharks	San Jose Barracuda	AHL	
April 12, 2022	Wyatt Aamodt	Colorado Avalanche	Minnesota State Mavericks	NCAA	
April 13, 2022	Magnus Hellberg	Detroit Red Wings	HC Sochi	KHL	
April 13, 2022	Ben Meyers	Colorado Avalanche	Minnesota Golden Gophers	NCAA	
April 14, 2022	Max Veronneau	San Jose Sharks	Leksands IF	SHL	
April 16, 2022	Wyatt Bongiovanni	Winnipeg Jets	Quinnipiac Bobcats	NCAA	
April 19, 2022	Strauss Mann	San Jose Sharks	Skelleftea AIK	SHL	
April 25, 2022	Turner Elson	Detroit Red Wings	Grand Rapids Griffins	AHL	
April 29, 2022	Bobby McMann	Toronto Maple Leafs	Toronto Marlies	AHL	
May 5, 2022	Milos Kelemen	Arizona Coyotes	BK Mlada Boleslav	ELH	
May 6, 2022	Oskari Salminen	Winnipeg Jets	Mikkelin Jukurit	Liiga	
May 7, 2022	Peetro Seppala	Seattle Kraken	Ilves	Liiga	
May 16, 2022	Pontus Andreasson	Detroit Red Wings	Lulea HF	SHL	
May 16, 2022	Adam Klapka	Calgary Flames	HC Bili Tygri Liberec	ELH	
May 16, 2022	Gustav Rydahl	New York Rangers	Farjestad BK	SHL	
May 18, 2022	Fredrik Olofsson	Dallas Stars	IK Oskarshamn	SHL	
May 19, 2022	Mitchell Russell	San Jose Sharks	North Bay Battalion	OHL	
May 22, 2022	Steven Kampfer	Detroit Red Wings	Ak Bars Kazan	KHL	
May 23, 2022	Filip Roos	Chicago Blackhawks	Skelleftea AIK	SHL	
May 24, 2022	Marcus Bjork	Columbus Blue Jackets	Brynas IF	SHL	
May 31, 2022	Ronald Knot	Arizona Coyotes	HC Neftekhimik Nizhnekamsk	KHL	
May 31, 2022	Pavol Regenda	Anaheim Ducks	HK Dukla Michalovce	Extraliga	
June 1, 2022	Joona Luoto	Columbus Blue Jackets	Tappara	Liiga	

== Trades ==
* Retained Salary Transaction: Each team is allowed up to three contracts on their payroll where they have retained salary in a trade (i.e. the player no longer plays with Team A due to a trade to Team B, but Team A still retains some salary). Only up to 50% of a player's contract can be kept, and only up to 15% of a team's salary cap can be taken up by retained salary. A contract can only be involved in one of these trades twice.

Hover over retained salary or conditional transactions for more information.

=== July ===
July 23, 2021	To Buffalo Sabres Robert Hagg; 1st-round pick in 2021; 2nd-round pick in 2023	To Philadelphia Flyers Rasmus Ristolainen
July 23, 2021	To New York Rangers Sammy Blais; 2nd-round pick in 2022	To St. Louis Blues Pavel Buchnevich
July 23, 2021	To Arizona Coyotes Jay Beagle; Loui Eriksson; Antoine Roussel; 1st-round pick in 2021; 2nd-round pick in 2022; 7th-round pick in 2023	To Vancouver Canucks Oliver Ekman-Larsson*; Conor Garland
July 23, 2021	To Chicago Blackhawks Seth Jones; TBL 1st-round pick in 2021; 6th-round pick in 2022	To Columbus Blue Jackets Adam Boqvist; 1st-round pick in 2021; 2nd-round pick in 2021 conditional 1st-round pick in 2022 or 1st-round pick in 2023
July 23, 2021	To Carolina Hurricanes CHI 2nd-round pick in 2021	To Columbus Blue Jackets Jake Bean
July 24, 2021	To Arizona Coyotes Cole Hults; Bokondji Imama	To Los Angeles Kings Brayden Burke; Tyler Steenbergen
July 24, 2021	To Columbus Blue Jackets Jakub Voracek	To Philadelphia Flyers Cam Atkinson
July 24, 2021	To Buffalo Sabres Devon Levi conditional 1st-round pick in 2022 or 1st-round pick in 2023	To Florida Panthers Sam Reinhart
July 26, 2021	To New Jersey Devils Christian Jaros	To San Jose Sharks Nick Merkley
July 26, 2021	To Boston Bruins J.D. Greenway	To Toronto Maple Leafs Future considerations
July 26, 2021	To Arizona Coyotes Vladislav Kolyachonok; Anton Stralman; 2nd-round pick in 2024	To Florida Panthers 7th-round pick in 2023
July 26, 2021	To Washington Capitals 2nd-round pick in 2022; 2nd-round pick in 2023	To Winnipeg Jets Brenden Dillon
July 27, 2021	To Chicago Blackhawks Marc-Andre Fleury	To Vegas Golden Knights Mikael Hakkarainen
July 27, 2021	To Colorado Avalanche Kurtis MacDermid	To Seattle Kraken 4th-round pick in 2023
July 27, 2021	To Vancouver Canucks 3rd-round pick in 2022	To Winnipeg Jets Nate Schmidt
July 27, 2021	To Chicago Blackhawks Tyler Johnson; 2nd-round pick in 2023	To Tampa Bay Lightning Brent Seabrook
July 28, 2021	To Calgary Flames Nikita Zadorov	To Chicago Blackhawks TOR 3rd-round pick in 2022
July 28, 2021	To Carolina Hurricanes Ethan Bear	To Edmonton Oilers Warren Foegele
July 28, 2021	To Minnesota Wild conditional 7th-round pick in 2022	To Toronto Maple Leafs Brennan Menell
July 28, 2021	To Ottawa Senators Nick Holden; VAN 3rd-round pick in 2022	To Vegas Golden Knights Evgenii Dadonov
July 28, 2021	To Arizona Coyotes 4th-round pick in 2024	To San Jose Sharks Lane Pederson
July 28, 2021	To Buffalo Sabres Will Butcher*; 5th-round pick in 2022	To New Jersey Devils Future considerations
July 28, 2021	To Boston Bruins 3rd-round pick in 2022	To Calgary Flames Daniel Vladar
July 28, 2021	To Seattle Kraken WPG 2nd-round pick in 2023	To Washington Capitals Vitek Vanecek
July 28, 2021	To Arizona Coyotes Conor Timmins; 1st-round pick in 2022 conditional 3rd-round pick in 2024	To Colorado Avalanche Darcy Kuemper*
July 29, 2021	To New York Rangers Ryan Reaves	To Vegas Golden Knights 3rd-round pick in 2022
July 30, 2021	To Detroit Red Wings Mitchell Stephens	To Tampa Bay Lightning 6th-round pick in 2022
July 31, 2021	To Tampa Bay Lightning Future considerations	To Vancouver Canucks Spencer Martin

==== Pick-only trades ====
July 23, 2021	To Dallas Stars WSH 1st-round pick in 2021 (#23 overall); NYR 2nd-round pick in 2021 (#48 overall); OTT 5th-round pick in 2021 (#138 overall)	To Detroit Red Wings 1st-round pick in 2021 (#15 overall)
July 23, 2021	To Edmonton Oilers 1st-round pick in 2021 (#22 overall); PIT 3rd-round pick in 2021 (#90 overall)	To Minnesota Wild 1st-round pick in 2021 (#20 overall)
July 23, 2021	To Carolina Hurricanes LAK 2nd-round pick in 2021 (#40 overall); 2nd-round pick in 2021 (#51 overall)	To Nashville Predators 1st-round pick in 2021 (#27 overall)
July 24, 2021	To Detroit Red Wings NJD 2nd-round pick in 2021 (#36 overall)	To Vegas Golden Knights 2nd-round pick in 2021 (#38 overall); TBL 4th-round pick in 2021 (#128 overall)
July 24, 2021	To Los Angeles Kings 2nd-round pick in 2021 (#42 overall)	To Ottawa Senators STL 2nd-round pick in 2021 (#49 overall); 5th-round pick in 2021 (#136 overall)
July 24, 2021	To Carolina Hurricanes 3rd-round pick in 2021 (#72 overall); CGY 4th-round pick in 2021 (#109 overall)	To Los Angeles Kings 2nd-round pick in 2021 (#59 overall)
July 24, 2021	To San Jose Sharks 3rd-round pick in 2021 (#81 overall); 6th-round pick in 2022	To St. Louis Blues 3rd-round pick in 2021 (#71 overall)
July 24, 2021	To Carolina Hurricanes 3rd-round pick in 2021 (#83 overall); 5th-round pick in 2021 (#147 overall)	To Nashville Predators LAK 3rd-round pick in 2021 (#72 overall)
July 24, 2021	To New York Rangers ARI 3rd-round pick in 2021 (#75 overall)	To Washington Capitals 3rd-round pick in 2021 (#80 overall); 6th-round pick in 2021 (#176 overall)
July 24, 2021	To Anaheim Ducks CHI 3rd-round pick in 2021 (#76 overall)	To Montreal Canadiens 3rd-round pick in 2022
July 24, 2021	To Calgary Flames TOR 3rd-round pick in 2021 (#89 overall); 6th-round pick in 2021 (#168 overall)	To Los Angeles Kings EDM 3rd-round pick in 2021 (#84 overall)
July 24, 2021	To Carolina Hurricanes 3rd-round pick in 2022	To Chicago Blackhawks 3rd-round pick in 2021 (#91 overall)
July 24, 2021	To Detroit Red Wings WPG 4th-round pick in 2021 (#114 overall); CAR 5th-round pick in 2021 (#155 overall)	To Vegas Golden Knights 4th-round pick in 2021 (#102 overall)
July 24, 2021	To Carolina Hurricanes LAK 5th-round pick in 2021 (#136 overall); 6th-round pick in 2021 (#170 overall)	To Ottawa Senators 4th-round pick in 2021 (#123 overall)
July 24, 2021	To Montreal Canadiens 4th-round pick in 2022	To Tampa Bay Lightning VGK 4th-round pick in 2021 (#126 overall)
July 24, 2021	To Minnesota Wild 4th-round pick in 2021 (#127 overall)	To Montreal Canadiens 5th-round pick in 2021 (#150 overall); 7th-round pick in 2021 (#214 overall)
July 24, 2021	To Arizona Coyotes 7th-round pick in 2021 (#223 overall)	To Montreal Canadiens STL 7th-round pick in 2022

=== September ===
September 4, 2021	To Arizona Coyotes conditional CAR 1st-round pick in 2022 or MTL 1st-round pick in 2022; 2nd-round pick in 2024	To Montreal Canadiens Christian Dvorak
September 25, 2021	To Ottawa Senators Zach Sanford	To St. Louis Blues Logan Brown conditional 4th-round pick in 2022

=== October ===
October 10, 2021	To Florida Panthers Olli Juolevi	To Vancouver Canucks Noah Juulsen; Juho Lammikko
October 24, 2021	To Ottawa Senators Dylan Gambrell	To San Jose Sharks SJS 7th-round pick in 2022

=== November ===
November 4, 2021	To Buffalo Sabres Peyton Krebs; Alex Tuch conditional 1st-round pick in 2022 or 1st-round pick in 2023 conditional 2nd-round pick in 2023 or 2nd-round pick in 2024	To Vegas Golden Knights Jack Eichel conditional 3rd-round pick in 2023 or 3rd-round pick in 2024
November 4, 2021	To Buffalo Sabres Johnny Boychuk	To New York Islanders Future considerations
November 16, 2021	To St. Louis Blues Future considerations	To Toronto Maple Leafs Kyle Clifford
November 30, 2021	To Nashville Predators Kole Sherwood	To Ottawa Senators Future considerations

=== December ===
December 2, 2021	To Buffalo Sabres Malcolm Subban	To Chicago Blackhawks Future considerations
December 9, 2021	To Chicago Blackhawks Kurtis Gabriel	To Toronto Maple Leafs Chad Krys
December 15, 2021	To New Jersey Devils Jon Gillies	To St. Louis Blues Future considerations
December 29, 2021	To Minnesota Wild Nolan Stevens	To St. Louis Blues Will Bitten

=== January ===
January 5, 2022	To Chicago Blackhawks Sam Lafferty	To Pittsburgh Penguins Alex Nylander

=== February ===
February 1, 2022	To Dallas Stars Alexei Lipanov	To Tampa Bay Lightning Tye Felhaber
February 1, 2022	To Nashville Predators Jimmy Huntington	To Tampa Bay Lightning Anthony Richard
February 12, 2022	To Minnesota Wild Brandon Baddock	To Montreal Canadiens Andrew Hammond
February 14, 2022	To Calgary Flames Tyler Toffoli	To Montreal Canadiens Emil Heineman; Tyler Pitlick conditional 1st-round pick in 2022 or 1st-round pick in 2023 conditional 4th-round pick in 2024; 5th-round pick in 2023
February 19, 2022	To Arizona Coyotes Nick Ritchie conditional 2nd-round pick in 2025 or 3rd-round pick in 2023	To Toronto Maple Leafs Ryan Dzingel; Ilya Lyubushkin
February 21, 2022	To Arizona Coyotes Future considerations	To Toronto Maple Leafs Carter Hutton
February 22, 2022	To Arizona Coyotes 7th-round pick in 2024	To Boston Bruins Michael Callahan

=== March ===
March 2, 2022	To Calgary Flames Michael McNiven	To Montreal Canadiens Future considerations
March 2, 2022	To Edmonton Oilers Future considerations	To San Jose Sharks Alex Stalock
March 14, 2022	To Anaheim Ducks Drew Helleson; 2nd-round pick in 2023	To Colorado Avalanche Josh Manson*
March 15, 2022	To Colorado Avalanche Nico Sturm	To Minnesota Wild Tyson Jost
March 16, 2022	To Florida Panthers conditional NYR 4th-round pick in 2022 or WPG 4th-round pick in 2022	To New York Rangers Frank Vatrano
March 16, 2022	To Florida Panthers Ben Chiarot*	To Montreal Canadiens Ty Smilanic conditional 1st-round pick in 2023 or 1st-round pick in 2024 conditional NYR 4th-round pick in 2022 or WPG 4th-round pick in 2022
March 16, 2022	To Calgary Flames Calle Jarnkrok*	To Seattle Kraken FLA 2nd-round pick in 2022; 3rd-round pick in 2023; 7th-round pick in 2024
March 18, 2022	To Chicago Blackhawks Boris Katchouk; Taylor Raddysh conditional 1st-round pick in 2023 or 1st-round pick in 2025 conditional 1st-round pick in 2024 or 1st-round pick in 2026	To Tampa Bay Lightning Brandon Hagel; 4th-round pick in 2022; 4th-round pick in 2024
March 19, 2022	To Anaheim Ducks 3rd-round pick in 2023	To Minnesota Wild Nicolas Deslauriers
March 19, 2022	To Anaheim Ducks John Moore; Urho Vaakanainen; 1st-round pick in 2022; 2nd-round pick in 2023; 2nd-round pick in 2024	To Boston Bruins Kodie Curran; Hampus Lindholm*
March 19, 2022	To Florida Panthers Connor Bunnaman; Claude Giroux*; German Rubtsov; 5th-round pick in 2024	To Philadelphia Flyers Owen Tippett conditional 1st-round pick in 2024 or 1st-round pick in 2025; 3rd-round pick in 2023
March 20, 2022	To Buffalo Sabres CGY 6th-round pick in 2022	To Florida Panthers Robert Hagg
March 20, 2022	To Ottawa Senators Travis Hamonic	To Vancouver Canucks VAN 3rd-round pick in 2022
March 20, 2022	To Detroit Red Wings 7th-round pick in 2022	To Los Angeles Kings Troy Stecher
March 20, 2022	To Toronto Maple Leafs WPG 3rd-round pick in 2022	To Vancouver Canucks Travis Dermott
March 20, 2022	To Seattle Kraken 2nd-round pick in 2022; 2nd-round pick in 2023; 3rd-round pick in 2024	To Toronto Maple Leafs Colin Blackwell; Mark Giordano*
March 20, 2022	To Ottawa Senators Mathieu Joseph; 4th-round pick in 2024	To Tampa Bay Lightning Nick Paul*
March 20, 2022	To Arizona Coyotes conditional 3rd-round pick in 2023 or 4th-round pick in 2023	To Dallas Stars Scott Wedgewood
March 20, 2022	To Nashville Predators Jeremy Lauzon	To Seattle Kraken 2nd-round pick in 2022
March 20, 2022	To Seattle Kraken 4th-round pick in 2023	To Winnipeg Jets Mason Appleton
March 21, 2022	To Pittsburgh Penguins Nathan Beaulieu	To Winnipeg Jets conditional 7th-round pick in 2022
March 21, 2022	To Arizona Coyotes Jack McBain	To Minnesota Wild VAN 2nd-round pick in 2022
March 21, 2022	To Arizona Coyotes Bryan Little; Nathan Smith	To Winnipeg Jets 4th-round pick in 2022
March 21, 2022	To Chicago Blackhawks conditional 1st-round pick in 2022 or 2nd-round pick in 2022	To Minnesota Wild Marc-Andre Fleury*
March 21, 2022	To Seattle Kraken Daniel Sprong; 4th-round pick in 2022; 6th-round pick in 2023	To Washington Capitals Marcus Johansson*
March 21, 2022	To Minnesota Wild Jacob Middleton	To San Jose Sharks Kaapo Kahkonen; SJS 5th-round pick in 2022
March 21, 2022	To Nashville Predators Alex Biega	To Toronto Maple Leafs Future considerations
March 21, 2022	To Los Angeles Kings Frederic Allard	To Nashville Predators Brayden Burke
March 21, 2022	To New York Rangers Justin Braun	To Philadelphia Flyers 3rd-round pick in 2023
March 21, 2022	To Edmonton Oilers Brett Kulak*	To Montreal Canadiens William Lagesson conditional 2nd-round pick in 2022 or 2nd-round pick in 2023; 7th-round pick in 2024
March 21, 2022	To Boston Bruins Josh Brown conditional 6th-round pick in 2022 or 7th-round pick in 2022	To Ottawa Senators Zach Senyshyn; 5th-round pick in 2022
March 21, 2022	To Colorado Avalanche Artturi Lehkonen*	To Montreal Canadiens Justin Barron; 2nd-round pick in 2024
March 21, 2022	To Detroit Red Wings Oskar Sundqvist; Jake Walman; 2nd-round pick in 2023	To St. Louis Blues Nick Leddy*; Luke Witkowski
March 21, 2022	To Arizona Coyotes 3rd-round pick in 2023	To Washington Capitals Johan Larsson
March 21, 2022	To Ottawa Senators 5th-round pick in 2022	To Winnipeg Jets Zach Sanford
March 21, 2022	To Colorado Avalanche Andrew Cogliano*	To San Jose Sharks 5th-round pick in 2024
March 21, 2022	To Montreal Canadiens Nate Schnarr	To New Jersey Devils Andrew Hammond
March 21, 2022	To New York Rangers Nick Merkley	To San Jose Sharks Anthony Bitetto
March 21, 2022	To New York Rangers Tyler Motte	To Vancouver Canucks 4th-round pick in 2023
March 21, 2022	To Edmonton Oilers Derick Brassard*	To Philadelphia Flyers 4th-round pick in 2023
March 21, 2022	To Calgary Flames Ryan Carpenter	To Chicago Blackhawks 5th-round pick in 2024
March 21, 2022	To Dallas Stars Vladislav Namestnikov*	To Detroit Red Wings 4th-round pick in 2024
March 21, 2022	To Calgary Flames Future considerations	To Ottawa Senators Michael McNiven
March 21, 2022	To Arizona Coyotes Future considerations	To Tampa Bay Lightning Riley Nash
March 21, 2022	To New York Rangers Andrew Copp; 6th-round pick in 2023	To Winnipeg Jets Morgan Barron conditional 1st-round pick in 2022 or 2nd-round pick in 2022 conditional STL 2nd-round pick in 2022 or 2nd-round pick in 2023; 5th-round pick in 2023
March 21, 2022	To Los Angeles Kings Nelson Nogier	To Winnipeg Jets Markus Phillips
March 21, 2022	To Anaheim Ducks Zach Aston-Reese; Calle Clang; Dominik Simon; 2nd-round pick in 2022	To Pittsburgh Penguins Rickard Rakell*
March 21, 2022	To San Jose Sharks Antoine Morand	To Tampa Bay Lightning Alexei Melnichuk
March 21, 2022	To Minnesota Wild Future considerations	To Seattle Kraken Victor Rask*
March 21, 2022	To Columbus Blue Jackets Tyler Inamoto	To Florida Panthers Max Domi*; TOR 6th-round pick in 2022
March 21, 2022	To Carolina Hurricanes Max Domi*	To Florida Panthers Egor Korshkov
March 21, 2022	To Carolina Hurricanes Tyler Inamoto	To Columbus Blue Jackets Aiden Hreschuk
March 23, 2022	To Philadelphia Flyers Brennan Menell	To Toronto Maple Leafs Future considerations
March 28, 2022	To Boston Bruins Future considerations	To St. Louis Blues Brady Lyle
March 28, 2022	To Carolina Hurricanes Tarmo Reunanen	To New York Rangers Maxim Letunov

=== June ===
June 10, 2022	To Buffalo Sabres Ben Bishop; 7th-round pick in 2022	To Dallas Stars Future considerations
June 16, 2022	To Montreal Canadiens Evgenii Dadonov	To Vegas Golden Knights Shea Weber
June 29, 2022	To Los Angeles Kings Kevin Fiala	To Minnesota Wild Brock Faber; 1st-round pick in 2022
June 30, 2022	To Columbus Blue Jackets Mathieu Olivier	To Nashville Predators TOR 4th-round pick in 2022

=== July (2022) ===
July 3, 2022	To Nashville Predators Ryan McDonagh	To Tampa Bay Lightning Grant Mismash; Philippe Myers

== Waivers ==
Once an NHL player has played in a certain number of games or a set number of seasons has passed since the signing of his first NHL contract (see here), that player must be offered to all of the other NHL teams before he can be assigned to a minor league affiliate.

Date	Player	New team	Previous team	Ref
October 2, 2021	Sam Montembeault	Montreal Canadiens	Florida Panthers	
October 3, 2021	Mason Geertsen	New Jersey Devils	New York Rangers	
October 4, 2021	Axel Jonsson-Fjallby	Buffalo Sabres	Washington Capitals	
October 5, 2021	Rem Pitlick	Minnesota Wild	Nashville Predators	
October 7, 2021	Jonah Gadjovich	San Jose Sharks	Vancouver Canucks	
October 11, 2021	Alex Barre-Boulet	Seattle Kraken	Tampa Bay Lightning	
October 11, 2021	Adam Brooks	Montreal Canadiens	Toronto Maple Leafs	
October 11, 2021	Patrick Brown	Philadelphia Flyers	Vegas Golden Knights	
October 11, 2021	Axel Jonsson-Fjallby	Washington Capitals	Buffalo Sabres	
October 13, 2021	Zack MacEwen	Philadelphia Flyers	Vancouver Canucks	
October 14, 2021	Dennis Cholowski	Washington Capitals	Seattle Kraken	
October 16, 2021	Christian Wolanin	Buffalo Sabres	Los Angeles Kings	
October 22, 2021	Alex Barre-Boulet	Tampa Bay Lightning	Seattle Kraken	
October 30, 2021	Michael Amadio	Vegas Golden Knights	Toronto Maple Leafs	
November 4, 2021	Scott Wedgewood	Arizona Coyotes	New Jersey Devils	
November 13, 2021	Nicolas Aube-Kubel	Colorado Avalanche	Philadelphia Flyers	
November 17, 2021	Adam Brooks	Vegas Golden Knights	Montreal Canadiens	
November 25, 2021	Nathan Bastian	New Jersey Devils	Seattle Kraken	
November 27, 2021	Adam Gaudette	Ottawa Senators	Chicago Blackhawks	
December 1, 2021	Christian Wolanin	Los Angeles Kings	Buffalo Sabres	
December 4, 2021	Kale Clague	Montreal Canadiens	Los Angeles Kings	
December 7, 2021	Kevin Connauton	Philadelphia Flyers	Florida Panthers	
December 7, 2021	Riley Nash	Tampa Bay Lightning	Winnipeg Jets	
December 13, 2021	Jonas Johansson	Florida Panthers	Colorado Avalanche	
January 6, 2022	Riley Nash	Arizona Coyotes	Tampa Bay Lightning	
January 11, 2022	Lucas Elvenes	Anaheim Ducks	Vegas Golden Knights	
January 12, 2022	Rem Pitlick	Montreal Canadiens	Minnesota Wild	
January 17, 2022	Karson Kuhlman	Seattle Kraken	Boston Bruins	
January 19, 2022	Gemel Smith	Detroit Red Wings	Tampa Bay Lightning	
February 8, 2022	Austin Czarnik	Seattle Kraken	New York Islanders	
February 9, 2022	Dennis Cholowski	Seattle Kraken	Washington Capitals	
February 16, 2022	Adam Brooks	Toronto Maple Leafs	Vegas Golden Knights	
February 18, 2022	Adam Brooks	Winnipeg Jets	Toronto Maple Leafs	
February 19, 2022	Gemel Smith	Tampa Bay Lightning	Detroit Red Wings	
February 21, 2022	Ryan Dzingel	San Jose Sharks	Toronto Maple Leafs	
February 24, 2022	Marian Studenic	Dallas Stars	New Jersey Devils	
March 6, 2022	Austin Czarnik	New York Islanders	Seattle Kraken	
March 6, 2022	Olli Juolevi	Detroit Red Wings	Florida Panthers	
March 8, 2022	Andrej Sustr	Anaheim Ducks	Tampa Bay Lightning	
March 20, 2022	Gerry Mayhew	Anaheim Ducks	Philadelphia Flyers	
March 21, 2022	Derrick Pouliot	Seattle Kraken	Vegas Golden Knights	
March 21, 2022	Brad Richardson	Vancouver Canucks	Calgary Flames	
March 21, 2022	Harri Sateri	Arizona Coyotes	Toronto Maple Leafs	

== See also ==
- 2021 NHL entry draft
- 2022 NHL entry draft
- 2021 in ice hockey
- 2022 in ice hockey
- 2020–21 NHL transactions
- 2022–23 NHL transactions
