= Timur Faizutdinov =

Russian ice hockey player (2001–2021)

- Born: 6 October 2001 Chelyabinsk, Russia
- Died: 16 March 2021 (aged 19) Yaroslavl, Russia
- Height: 187 cm (6 ft 2 in)
- Weight: 88 kg (194 lb; 13 st 12 lb)
- Position: Defenceman
- Played for: Dinamo Saint Petersburg
- Playing career: 2017–2021

Timur Ramilevich Faizutdinov (Russian: Тимур Рамилевич Файзутдинов; 6 October 2001 – 16 March 2021) was a Russian ice hockey defenceman. He played for Dinamo Saint Petersburg, (JHL) of which he was the team captain at the time of his death.

On 12 March 2021, Faizutdinov was struck in the head by a hockey puck while playing in the final 16 of the Kharlamov Cup against Loko in Yaroslavl, Russia. Faizutdinov's father, Ramil, wrote on social media that his son was struck in the area of the carotid artery. Faizutdinov was hospitalized in serious condition, and died four days later, on 16 March, at the age of 19 years old. HC Dinamo Saint Petersburg announced that upcoming games would begin with a minute of silence for Faizutdinov.
