= Bruno Ghedina =

Italian ice hockey player (1943–2021)

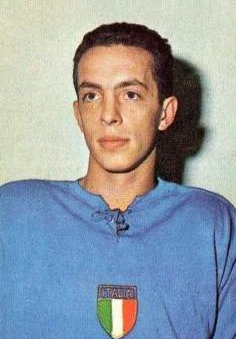
- Born: 21 February 1943 Cortina d'Ampezzo, Italy
- Died: 10 January 2021 (aged 77) Belluno, Italy
- Played for: SG Cortina
- Playing career: 1960–1975

Bruno Ghedina (21 February 1943 – 10 January 2021) was an Italian ice hockey player.

== Life ==
He competed at the 1964 Winter Olympics. With the SG Cortina, Ghedina won 8 times the scudetto.

Ghedina died from COVID-19 on 10 January 2021, age 77, during the COVID-19 pandemic in Italy. His wife had also died from the disease a day earlier.
