= 2021 Women's Ice Hockey World Championships =

Tournament details
- Host country: Canada
- Venue: 1 (in 1 host city)
- Teams: 10

Final positions
- Champions: Canada (11th title)
- Runners-up: United States
- Third place: Finland

The 2021 Women's Ice Hockey World Championships were the 24th such series of tournaments organized by the International Ice Hockey Federation. Originally scheduled to comprise six tournaments across four divisions, the event was significantly curtailed due to the COVID-19 pandemic. On 18 November 2020, the IIHF announced the cancellation of the Divisions I, II and III tournaments at the recommendation of the IIHF COVID-19 Expert Group. Only the Top Division tournament was maintained, bringing the number of participating nations from 42 to 10. With only one tournament held, the standard system of promotion and relegation between divisions and groups was not implemented and each team remained in the tournament pool designated for the 2021 event at the 2022 championships.

== Championship (Top Division) ==
The tournament was scheduled to be held in Halifax and Truro, Canada, from 6 to 16 May 2021. It was cancelled in Nova Scotia on 21 April 2021, with the IIHF and Hockey Canada looking for a new host for summer 2021. On 30 April 2021, the IIHF announced that the tournament took place between 20 and 31 August 2021. On 2 June 2021, Calgary was announced as the new host.

Pos	Grp	Team	Pld	W	OTW	OTL	L	GF	GA	GD	Pts	Final result
1	A	Canada (H)	7	6	1	0	0	34	7	+27	20	Champions
2	A	United States	7	5	0	1	1	28	10	+18	16	Runners-up
3	A	Finland	7	4	0	0	3	17	12	+5	12	Third place
4	A	Switzerland	7	0	1	0	6	5	26	−21	2	Fourth place
5	A	ROC	7	3	0	1	3	11	21	−10	10	Fifth place game
6	B	Japan	7	4	0	0	3	12	20	−8	12	Fifth place game
7	B	Czech Republic	6	4	0	0	2	18	7	+11	12	
8	B	Germany	6	2	0	0	4	9	15	−6	6	
9	B	Hungary	4	1	0	0	3	8	12	−4	3	Eliminated in Preliminary round
10	B	Denmark	4	0	0	0	4	3	15	−12	0	Eliminated in Preliminary round

Source: IIHF
Rules for classification: 1) position in the group; 2) number of points; 3) goal difference; 4) goals scored; 5) seeding before tournament.
(H) Host

== Division I ==
=== Division I Group A ===
The Division I Group A tournament was scheduled to be held in Angers, France, from 11 to 18 April 2021.

The following teams were to participate in the tournament:

- Austria
- France
- Netherlands
- Norway
- Slovakia
- Sweden

=== Division I Group B ===
The Division I Group B tournament was scheduled to be held in Beijing, China, from 8 to 14 April 2021.

The following teams were to participate in the tournament:

- China
- Italy
- Kazakhstan
- Poland
- Slovenia
- South Korea

== Division II ==
=== Division II Group A ===
The Division II Group A tournament was scheduled to be held in Jaca, Spain, from 10 to 16 April 2021.

The following teams were to participate in the tournament:

- Chinese Taipei
- Great Britain
- Latvia
- Mexico
- North Korea
- Spain

=== Division II Group B ===
The Division II Group B tournament was scheduled to be held in Zagreb, Croatia, from 7 to 13 March 2021.

The following teams were to participate in the tournament:

- Australia
- Croatia
- Iceland
- ~~New Zealand~~
- South Africa – Promoted from the 2020 Division III
- Turkey

== Division III ==
The Division III tournament was scheduled to be held in Kaunas, Lithuania, from 15 to 21 March 2021.

The following teams were to participate in the tournament:

- Belgium
- Bosnia and Herzegovina
- Bulgaria
- Estonia
- Hong Kong
- Lithuania
- Romania
- Ukraine – Relegated from the 2020 Division II B
