= Rašid Šemsedinović =

Serbian ice hockey player (1941–2021)

Personal information
- Nationality: Serbian
- Born: 11 January 1941; Belgrade, Yugoslavia
- Died: 14 November 2021 (aged 80); Belgrade, Serbia

Sport
- Sport: Ice hockey

Rašid Šemsedinović (11 January 1941 – 14 November 2021) was a Serbian ice hockey player. He competed in the men's tournament at the 1964 Winter Olympics.

He died in Belgrade on 14 November 2021, at the age of 80.
