= François Blank =

Swiss ice hockey player (1930–2021)

- Born: 30 December 1930; Neuchâtel, Switzerland
- Died: 3 November 2021 (aged 90)
- Position: Right wing
- Shot: Right
- National team: Switzerland
- Playing career: 1947–1966

François Blank (30 December 1930 – 3 November 2021) was a Swiss ice hockey player who competed for the Swiss national team at the 1952 Winter Olympics.
