= Boris Kosarev (ice hockey) =

Soviet-Belarusian ice hockey player and coach (1951–2021)

- Born: 28 July 1951 Chelyabinsk, Russian SFSR
- Died: 1 March 2021 (aged 69)
- Position: Forward
- Played for: Traktor Chelyabinsk; HC Dinamo Minsk
- Playing career: 1968–1980

Boris Kosarev (28 July 1951 – 1 March 2021) was a Soviet-Belarusian ice hockey player and coach. He played forward for Traktor Chelyabinsk and HC Dinamo Minsk and subsequently coached the latter from 1982 to 1985. He also coached Yunost Minsk and Khimik-SKA Novopolotsk. He was a Master of Sport of the USSR.
