= Mason Geertsen =

Canadian ice hockey player (born 1995)

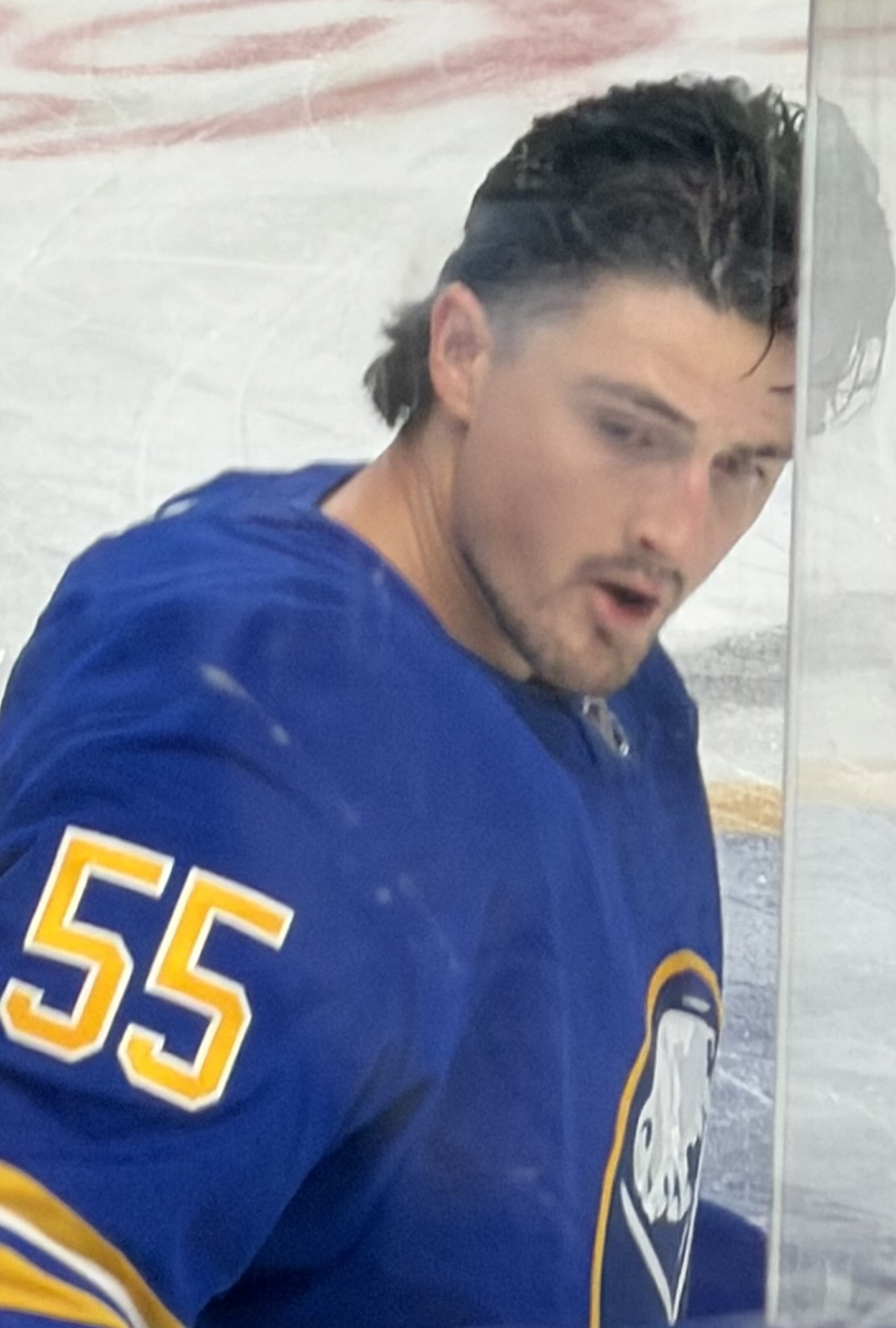
- Geertsen with the Buffalo Sabres in 2025
- Born: April 19, 1995 (age 31) Drayton Valley, Alberta, Canada
- Height: 6 ft 5 in (196 cm)
- Weight: 230 lb (104 kg; 16 st 6 lb)
- Position: Defence / Left wing
- Shoots: Left
- NHL team (P) Cur. team Former teams: Buffalo Sabres; Rochester Americans (AHL); New Jersey Devils
- NHL draft: 93rd overall, 2013; Colorado Avalanche
- Playing career: 2015–present

Mason Geertsen (born April 19, 1995) is a Canadian professional ice hockey player for the Rochester Americans in the American Hockey League (AHL) while under contract to the Buffalo Sabres of the National Hockey League (NHL). He was selected in the fourth round, 93rd overall, by the Colorado Avalanche in the 2013 NHL entry draft.

== Playing career ==
Geersten played bantam and midget hockey as a youth with the Leduc Oil Kings in the Alberta Major Bantam Hockey League and with the Sherwood Park Kings in the Alberta Midget Hockey League before joining major junior club, the Edmonton Oil Kings of the Western Hockey League (WHL), with whom he was drafted 18th overall in the first round of the 2010 WHL Bantam Draft.

In the following 2016–17 season, Geertsen was assigned to continue with the Rampage, on October 1, 2016. Used primarily in a defensive role adding physicality, Geertsen appeared in 36 games with the Rampage for 4 assists. He split the season again between the AHL and ECHL joining secondary affiliate, the Colorado Eagles in time for the postseason. Geersten remained with the club through the postseason, establishing a regular spot on the defence in recording 1 goal and 4 points in 19 games to help the Eagles capture their first Kelly Cup.

As an impending restricted free agent following the conclusion of his entry-level contract, Geertsen's tenure with the Avalanche ended after he was not tendered a qualifying offer on June 25, 2019. As a free agent over the summer, Geertsen was invited to attend the New York Rangers 2019 training camp. After a successful camp, Geertsen was among the Rangers second round of cuts and was signed to a one-year AHL contract with affiliate, the Hartford Wolf Pack, on September 29, 2019.

In the 2019–20 season, Geertsen established a role within the Wolf Pack's blueline as a physical stay-at-home defenceman, appearing in 60 regular season games and leading the club with 109 penalty minutes, before the season was cancelled due to the COVID-19 pandemic. On April 23, 2020, Geertsen was signed to remain within the Wolf Pack organization, agreeing to a one-year contract extension.

Entering the pandemic-delayed 2020–21 season, Geersten registered one assist through four games before he was signed to a two-year, two-way contract with the NHL affiliate, the New York Rangers, on March 4, 2021.

On October 3, 2021, Geertsen was claimed off waivers by the New Jersey Devils. He made his NHL debut on October 19, 2021, in a game against the Seattle Kraken. He would play 25 games for the Devils that season, and on July 13, 2022, he signed a one-year contract extension at league minimum salary to stay with New Jersey.

Geertsen spent the 2022–23 season with the Devils' AHL affiliate, the Utica Comets, where he set AHL career highs of 4 goals and 136 penalty minutes.

As a free agent from the Devils, Geertsen was signed to a two-year, two-way contract with the Vegas Golden Knights on July 1, 2023. Throughout the duration of his contract with the Golden Knights, Geertsen played the entirety with Vegas' AHL affiliate, the Henderson Silver Knights.

On July 1, 2025, on the first day of free agency, Geertsen was signed to a two-year, two-way contract with the Buffalo Sabres.

== International play ==
Geertsen represented Canada Pacific at the 2012 World U-17 Hockey Challenge in Windsor, Ontario. He was scoreless in five games from the blueline in a fifth place finish.

== Personal life ==
Geertsen has been married to his long term partner, Clarity Geertsen, since 2023. They welcomed a daughter in 2026.

On November 22, 2024, ahead of the Silver Knights' annual Hockey Fights Cancer night, Geertsen released a statement announcing that he had been diagnosed with non-Hodgkin lymphoma, a form of blood cancer, in November 2023, adding that it was the cause of a one-month absence during the 2023–24 season. After undergoing treatment through the summer of 2024, Geertsen's cancer went into remission before the 2024–25 season.

== Career statistics ==
=== Regular season and playoffs ===
			Regular season					Playoffs
Season	Team	League	GP	G	A	Pts	PIM	GP	G	A	Pts	PIM
2010–11	Sherwood Park Kings	AMHL	31	3	7	10	84	10	1	2	3	24
2010–11	Edmonton Oil Kings	WHL	3	0	0	0	2	—	—	—	—	—
2011–12	Edmonton Oil Kings	WHL	34	0	3	3	70	—	—	—	—	—
2012–13	Edmonton Oil Kings	WHL	15	0	4	4	32	—	—	—	—	—
2012–13	Vancouver Giants	WHL	58	2	8	10	98	—	—	—	—	—
2013–14	Vancouver Giants	WHL	66	4	19	23	126	4	0	0	0	14
2014–15	Vancouver Giants	WHL	69	13	25	38	107	—	—	—	—	—
2014–15	Lake Erie Monsters	AHL	9	0	0	0	2	—	—	—	—	—
2015–16	San Antonio Rampage	AHL	42	0	8	8	62	—	—	—	—	—
2015–16	Fort Wayne Komets	ECHL	21	1	3	4	18	14	0	3	3	15
2016–17	San Antonio Rampage	AHL	36	0	4	4	52	—	—	—	—	—
2016–17	Colorado Eagles	ECHL	9	0	5	5	14	19	1	3	4	42
2017–18	San Antonio Rampage	AHL	72	3	6	9	117	—	—	—	—	—
2018–19	Colorado Eagles	AHL	58	3	13	16	134	4	0	0	0	8
2019–20	Hartford Wolf Pack	AHL	60	0	8	8	109	—	—	—	—	—
2020–21	Hartford Wolf Pack	AHL	20	3	2	5	43	—	—	—	—	—
2021–22	New Jersey Devils	NHL	25	0	0	0	77	—	—	—	—	—
2022–23	Utica Comets	AHL	61	4	4	8	136	4	0	2	2	4
2023–24	Henderson Silver Knights	AHL	58	6	0	6	108	—	—	—	—	—
2024–25	Henderson Silver Knights	AHL	31	0	5	5	77	—	—	—	—	—
2025–26	Buffalo Sabres	NHL	5	0	0	0	12	—	—	—	—	—
2025–26	Rochester Americans	AHL	35	2	2	4	77	3	0	0	0	12
NHL totals			30	0	0	0	89	—	—	—	—	—

=== International ===
Year	Team	Event	Result	GP	G	A	Pts	PIM
2012	Canada Pacific	U17	5th	5	0	0	0	2
Junior totals				5	0	0	0	2

== Awards and honours ==
Award	Year
WHL
Ed Chynoweth Cup champion	2012
ECHL
Kelly Cup champion	2017
