= Nick DeSimone =

American ice hockey player (born 1994)

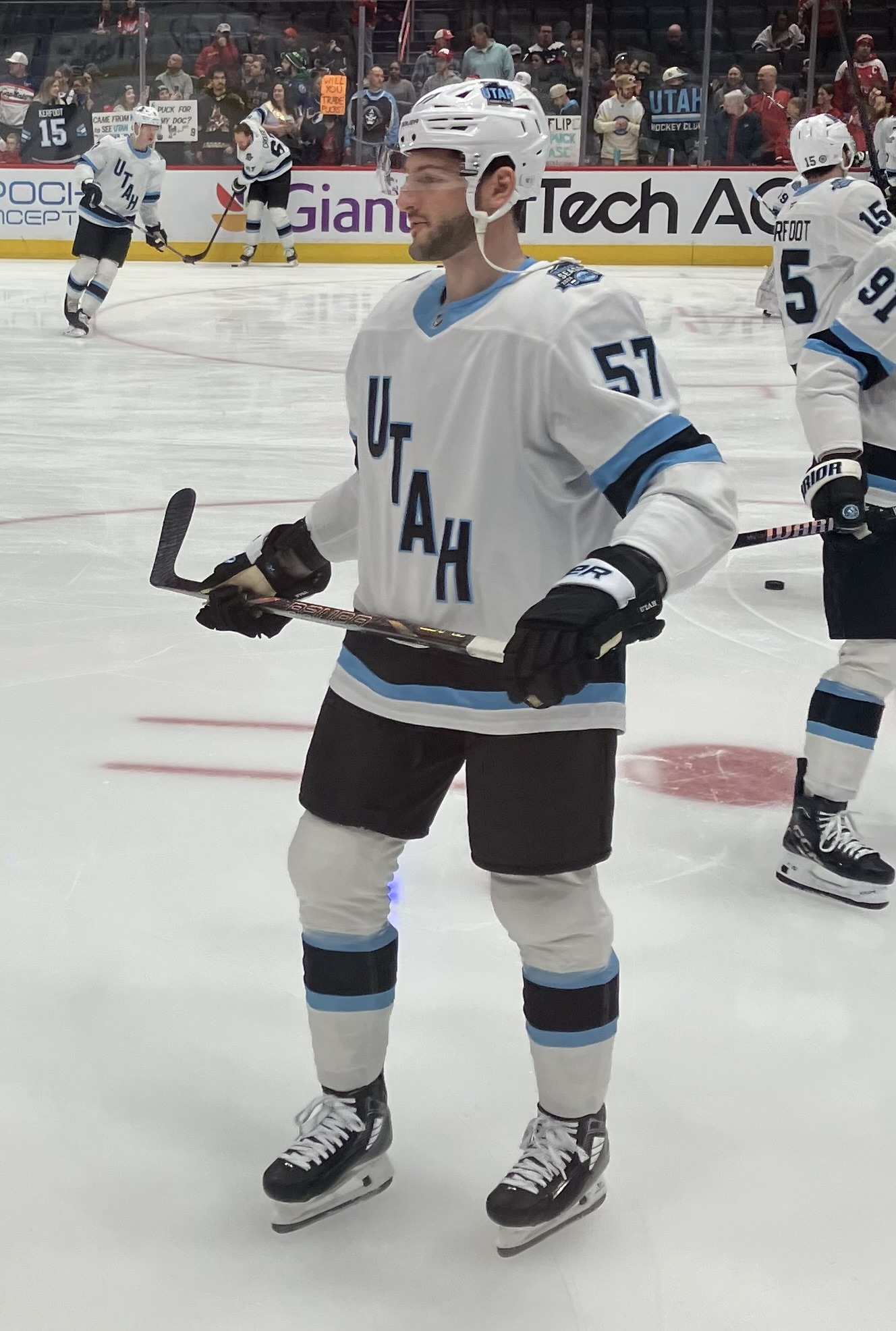
- DeSimone with the Utah Hockey Club in 2025.
- Born: November 21, 1994 (age 31) East Amherst, New York, U.S
- Height: 6 ft 2 in (188 cm)
- Weight: 190 lb (86 kg; 13 st 8 lb)
- Position: Defense
- Shoots: Right
- NHL team Former teams: Utah Mammoth; Calgary Flames; New Jersey Devils
- NHL draft: Undrafted
- Playing career: 2017–present

Nick DeSimone (born November 21, 1994) is an American professional ice hockey player who is a defenseman for the Utah Mammoth of the National Hockey League (NHL).

== Playing career ==
He played college ice hockey at Union College. Undrafted, he signed a two-year contract with the San Jose Sharks on March 30, 2017, and was later re-signed to a two-year contract on July 11, 2019.

On April 12, 2019, DeSimone was traded to the Vegas Golden Knights who then loaned him to the Rochester Americans of the American Hockey League (AHL).

On July 17, 2021, his player rights were traded to the New York Rangers. As an unrestricted free agent DeSimone signed a one-year, two way contract with the Calgary Flames on July 28, later re-signing with the Flames to a two-year, two-way contract on July 13, 2022. He played his first NHL game on November 7, 2022, a 4–3 overtime loss to the New York Islanders.

On January 25, 2024, DeSimone was claimed off of waivers by the New Jersey Devils. He signed a one-year, one-way contract extension with the Devils on June 24.

In the following 2024–25 season, DeSimone played 12 games with the Devils AHL affiliate, the Utica Comets, before serving as a healthy scratch on the Devils blueline. On January 5, 2025, having been placed on waivers by the Devils, DeSimone was claimed by the Utah Hockey Club. DeSimone was deployed on Utah's blueline and found a role on the third-pair in posting 1 goal and 6 points through 20 regular season contests.

On May 30, 2025, DeSimone was re-signed to a one-year, $800,000 contract extension with the Utah Mammoth for the 2025–26 season.

== Career statistics ==
| | | | Regular season | | | | | Playoffs |
| Season | Team | League | GP | G | A | Pts | PIM | GP | G | A | Pts | PIM |
|---|---|---|---|---|---|---|---|---|---|---|---|---|
| 2012–13 | Connecticut Oilers | EJHL | 37 | 5 | 10 | 15 | 24 | 2 | 1 | 0 | 1 | 2 |
| 2013–14 | Buffalo Jr. Sabres | OJHL | 52 | 13 | 38 | 51 | 30 | 11 | 4 | 2 | 6 | 8 |
| 2014–15 | Union College | ECAC | 35 | 2 | 9 | 11 | 10 | — | — | — | — | — |
| 2015–16 | Union College | ECAC | 36 | 4 | 14 | 18 | 16 | — | — | — | — | — |
| 2016–17 | Union College | ECAC | 38 | 9 | 10 | 19 | 16 | — | — | — | — | — |
| 2016–17 | San Jose Barracuda | AHL | 4 | 1 | 0 | 1 | 0 | 13 | 1 | 5 | 6 | 0 |
| 2017–18 | San Jose Barracuda | AHL | 59 | 6 | 14 | 20 | 8 | 4 | 0 | 1 | 1 | 2 |
| 2018–19 | San Jose Barracuda | AHL | 65 | 14 | 32 | 46 | 30 | 4 | 1 | 1 | 2 | 2 |
| 2019–20 | San Jose Barracuda | AHL | 48 | 5 | 14 | 19 | 21 | — | — | — | — | — |
| 2020–21 | San Jose Barracuda | AHL | 14 | 0 | 5 | 5 | 2 | — | — | — | — | — |
| 2020–21 | Rochester Americans | AHL | 8 | 0 | 6 | 6 | 2 | — | — | — | — | — |
| 2021–22 | Stockton Heat | AHL | 68 | 4 | 21 | 25 | 28 | 13 | 2 | 3 | 5 | 4 |
| 2022–23 | Calgary Wranglers | AHL | 65 | 8 | 38 | 46 | 38 | 9 | 2 | 4 | 6 | 6 |
| 2022–23 | Calgary Flames | NHL | 4 | 0 | 0 | 0 | 2 | — | — | — | — | — |
| 2023–24 | Calgary Wranglers | AHL | 10 | 0 | 8 | 8 | 0 | — | — | — | — | — |
| 2023–24 | Calgary Flames | NHL | 23 | 1 | 4 | 5 | 2 | — | — | — | — | — |
| 2023–24 | New Jersey Devils | NHL | 11 | 1 | 1 | 2 | 2 | — | — | — | — | — |
| 2024–25 | Utica Comets | AHL | 12 | 0 | 3 | 3 | 4 | — | — | — | — | — |
| 2024–25 | Utah Hockey Club | NHL | 20 | 1 | 5 | 6 | 0 | — | — | — | — | — |
| 2025–26 | Utah Mammoth | NHL | 40 | 2 | 6 | 8 | 10 | — | — | — | — | — |
| NHL totals | | | 98 | 5 | 16 | 21 | 16 | — | — | — | — | — |

== Awards and honors ==
| Award | Year | Ref |
OJHL
| First All-Star Team | 2014 | |
