= Deaths of sportspeople in 2021 =

Deaths of notable sports officials and players in 2021.

In each table, the names are listed in alphabetical order

== January ==
1

Nationality	Person	Sport	Age	Cause of death	Ref.
England	Clint Boulton	Association football	72	Unknown	
Italy	Emanuele Chiapasco	Baseball	90	Unknown	
Canada	Paul Delorey	Curling	71	Unknown	
Iceland	Ágúst Herbert Guðmundsson	Basketball	53	Motor neuron disease	
France	Bernard Guignedoux	Association football	73	Unknown	
Colombia	Pablo Hernández	Cycling	80	Unknown	
United States	Floyd Little	American football	78	Cancer	
Norway	Harald Maartmann	Cross-country skiing	94	Unknown	
Netherlands	Paatje Phefferkorn	Martial arts	98	COVID-19	

2

Nationality	Person	Sport	Age	Cause of death	Ref.
Brazil	Cléber Eduardo Arado	Association football	48	COVID-19	
Indonesia	Alex Asmasoebrata	Auto racing	69	Unknown	
Spain	Miquel Ferrer	Association football	89	Unknown	
Canada	Rob Flockhart	Ice hockey	64	Heart attack	
South Africa	Ryder Mofokeng	Association football	68	Unknown	
United States	Don Salls	American football	101	Unknown	
Russia	Yuri Saukh	Association football	69	Unknown	
United States	Paul Westphal	Basketball	70	Glioblastoma	
Wales	Brian Whitcombe	Rugby union	86	Unknown	

== November ==
1

Nationality	Person	Sport	Age	Cause of death	Ref.
Scotland	Brian Adair	Cricket	86	Unknown	
Pakistan	Gulraiz Akhtar	Field hockey	78	Unknown	
Canada	Hugo Dittfach	Horse racing	85	Unknown	
England	Alan Igglesden	Cricket	57	Brain cancer	
Italy	Poerio Mascella	Association football	71	Unknown	
Ireland	Maurice Price	Association football	83	Unknown	

2

Nationality	Person	Sport	Age	Cause of death	Ref.
United States	John Aiken	Ice hockey	89	Unknown	
United States	Jane Brown Grimes	Tennis	80	Unknown	
Ireland	Des Ferguson	Gaelic football	91	Unknown	
Sweden	Tomas Leandersson	Ten-pin bowling	55	Unknown	
United States	John Marshall	American football	76	Unknown	
Canada	Alf Mayer	Shooting	83	Unknown	
Ireland	John Joe O'Hagan	Gaelic football	91	Unknown	
England	Alf Patrick	Association football	100	Unknown	
Italy	Luciano Piquè	Association football	86	Unknown	
Ukraine	Viktor Putyatin	Fencing	80	Unknown	
Algeria	Mohamed Soukhane	Association football	90	Unknown	

3

Nationality	Person	Sport	Age	Cause of death	Ref.
Switzerland	François Blank	Ice hockey	90	Unknown	
Germany	Hermann Haverkamp	Water polo	79	Unknown	
Japan	Yasuro Kikuchi	Go	93	Unknown	
United States	Tom Matte	American football	82	Unknown	
United States	Warren Powers	American football	80	Alzheimer's disease	
Russia	Andrei Redkous	Association football	64	Unknown	
Slovakia	Boris Sádecký	Ice hockey	24	Cardiac arrest	
Denmark	Kurt Thyboe	Sports commentator	81	Pneumonia	

4

Nationality	Person	Sport	Age	Cause of death	Ref.
Scotland	Walter Cameron	Association football	78–79 (Note: Since the birth month of Walter Cameron is unknown, his age could have been 78 or 79.)	Unknown	
Bosnia and Herzegovina	Amela Fetahović	Association football	35	Unknown	
Israel	Amatsia Levkovich	Association football	83	Unknown	
Italy	Eugenio Pazzaglia	Association football	72	Unknown	
United States	Mike Pitts	American football	61	Unknown	
United States	Roger Zatkoff	American football	90	Unknown	

5

Nationality	Person	Sport	Age	Cause of death	Ref.
Canada	Charlie Burns	Ice hockey	85	Unknown	
Australia	Russell Ebert	Australian rules football	72	Leukaemia	
Poland	Ryszard Grzegorczyk	Association football	82	Unknown	
Italy	Luigi Maldera	Association football	75	Unknown	
Slovakia	Dušan Pašek	Ice hockey	36	Suicide by hanging	
Germany	Flip Stapper	Association football	76	Unknown	
Belarus	Konstantin Wajgin	Biathlon	57	Unknown	

6

Nationality	Person	Sport	Age	Cause of death	Ref.
Slovakia	Pavol Molnár	Association football	85	Unknown	
United States	Angelo Mosca	Canadian football	84	Unknown	
Jamaica	Shawn Rhoden	Professional bodybuilding	46	Heart attack	
Brazil	Luíz Antônio dos Santos	Long-distance running	57	Cardiac arrest	
India	Tarak Sinha	Cricket	70	Lung cancer	
United States	Harvey White	American football	83	Unknown	

7

Nationality	Person	Sport	Age	Cause of death	Ref.
Russia	Liudmila Belavenets	Chess	81	COVID-19	
India	Sunit Ghosh	Cricket	87	Unknown	
United States	Robin Greiner	Pair skating	89	Unknown	
England	Barry Jackson	Association football	83	Unknown	
Russia	Aliya Khambikova	Volleyball	21	Unknown	
Russia	Igor Nikulin	Hammer throw	61	Unknown	
Australia	Brian Renwood	Australian rules football	86	Unknown	
United States	Ronnie Williams	Basketball	59	Brain cancer	

8

Nationality	Person	Sport	Age	Cause of death	Ref.
Netherlands	Rinus Bennaars	Association football	90	Unknown	
Australia	Keith Bradshaw	Cricket	58	Multiple myeloma	
United States	Medina Dixon	Basketball	59	Pancreatic cancer	
Puerto Rico	Pedro Feliciano	Baseball	45	Unknown	
South Africa	Mike Harris	Formula One	82	Unknown	
Eritrea	Desiet Kidane	Road bicycle racing	21	Traffic collision	
South Korea	Kim Kyeong-bo	Esports	20	Unknown	
England	Cecilia Robinson	Cricket	97	Unknown	

9

Nationality	Person	Sport	Age	Cause of death	Ref.
Germany	Erika Fisch	Long jump	87	Unknown	
Liberia	Willis Forko	Association football	37	Unknown	
Algeria	Loucif Hamani	Boxing	71	Unknown	
Mexico	Memo Luna	Baseball	91	Unknown	
Italy	Francesco Romani	Karate	88	Complications from a fall	
Wales	Laurie Sheffield	Association football	82	Unknown	
United States	Duane Wilson	Baseball	87	Unknown	

10

11

12

13

Nationality	Person	Sport	Age	Cause of death	Ref.
Bulgaria	Ivo Georgiev	Association football	49	Heart failure	
United States	Sam Huff	American football	87	Unknown	

14
