= List of Dutch Indos =

This list compiles the names of notable Dutch Euro-Indonesian people, i.e. individuals of mixed Indonesian and European ancestry or full Indonesian ancestry in the Netherlands, or individuals of Dutch ancestry in Indonesia (the former Dutch East Indies).

For more context see the article "Indo people".

== Music ==
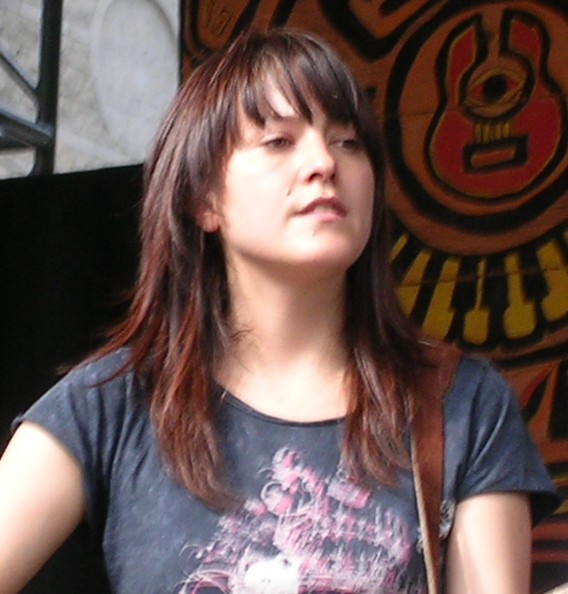
Keren Ann

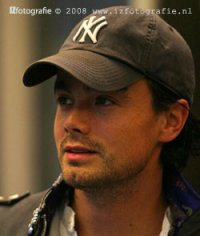
Dinand Woesthoff (leadsinger Kane)
- Keren Ann, Dutch-Israeli singer
- René van Barneveld aka Tres Manos, guitarist Urban Dance Squad
- Michelle Branch, singer-songwriter
- Patty Brard, singer
- Xander de Buisonjé, singer Volumia!
- Glenn Corneille, musician
- Wieteke van Dort, singer
- DJ Paul Elstak, dj
- Caro Emerald, jazz singer
- George de Fretes, musician
- Anneke Grönloh, singer
- Alex van Halen, drummer Van Halen
- Eddie van Halen, guitarist Van Halen
- Armand Van Helden, DJ
- Andres Holten, singer
- Ernst Jansz, musician, writer Doe Maar
- Jack Jersey, singer
- Monique Klemann, singer Loïs Lane
- Suzanne Klemann, singer Loïs Lane
- Dennis van Leeuwen, musician Kane (Dutch band)
- Jamai Loman, singer, Dutch Idols
- Taco Ockerse, singer, also known as Taco
- Wim Soekhie, drummer Skybox (Dutch Band), ex-Cat Monkey
- Abbie de Quant, flutist
- Sandra Reemer, singer
- Skate the Great, rapper
- Ria Thielsch, singer
- Andy Tielman, band/singer Tielman Brothers
- Linda Wagenmakers, musical singer
- Dinand Woesthoff, singer Kane (Dutch band)
- Riem de Wolf, singer Blue Diamonds
- Ruud de Wolf, singer Blue Diamonds
- James Intveld, singer, actor
- Nurlaila Karim, singer
- Rosy Pereira, singer

== Literature ==
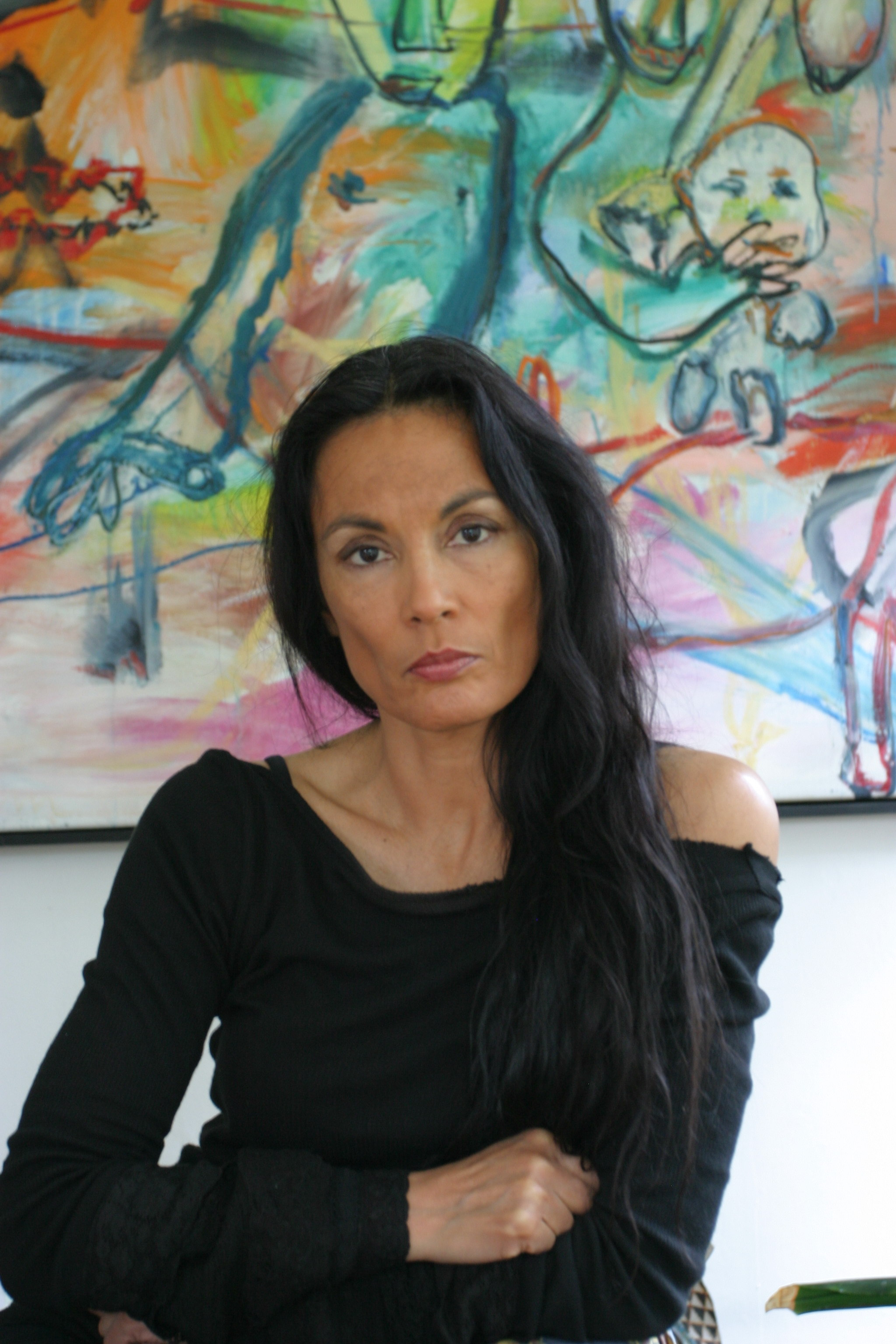
Marion Bloem

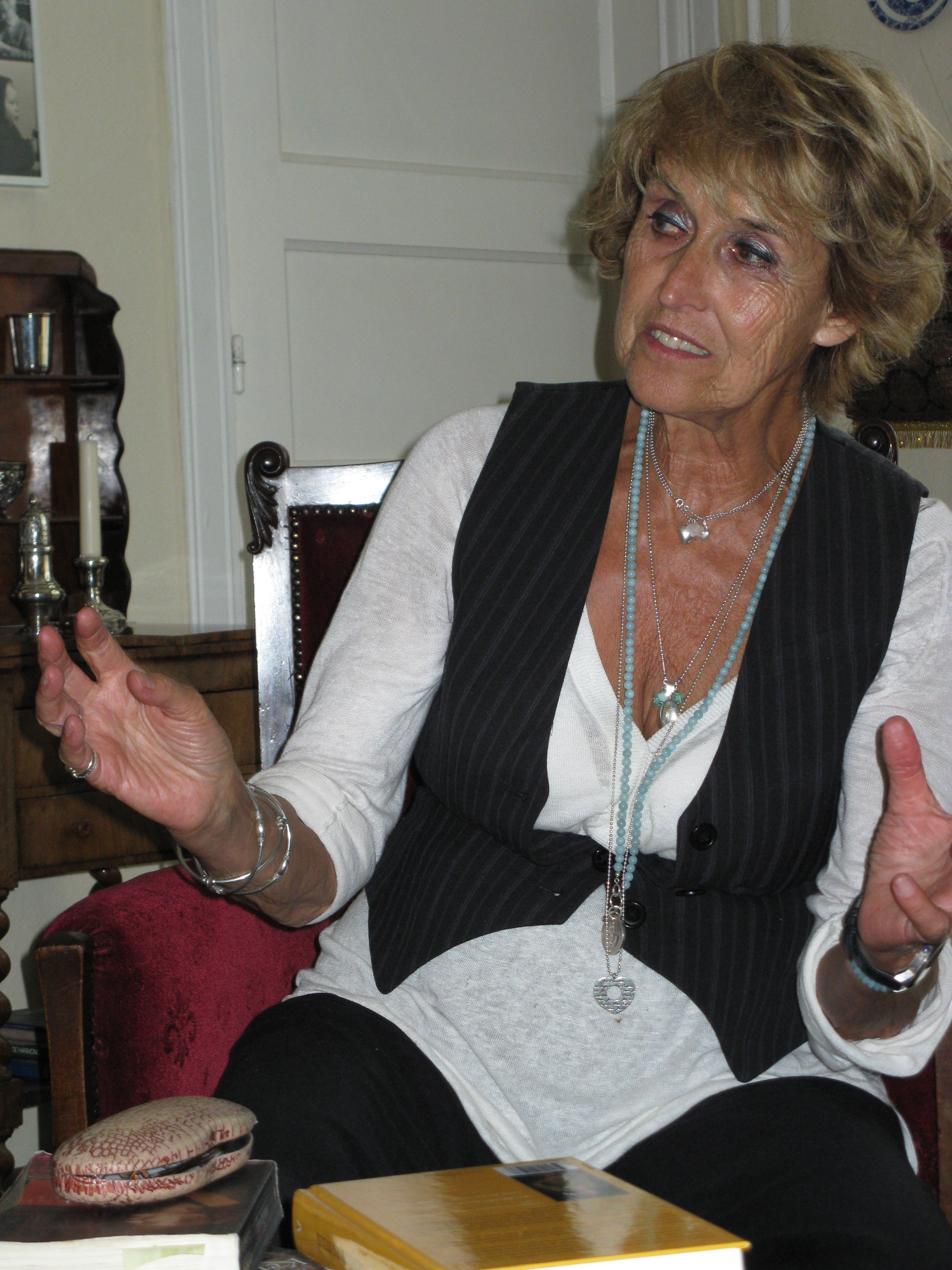
Yvonne Keuls
- Marion Bloem, writer (Indo father and mother)
- Louis Couperus (1863–1923), writer
- Theodor Holman, writer
- Victor Ido, writer
- Yvonne Keuls, writer
- Rob Nieuwenhuys, (1908–1999) writer (Dutch father, Indo mother)
- E. du Perron, (1899–1940) writer
- Tjalie Robinson, (1911–1974) writer and activist (Dutch father, Indo mother)
- Beb Vuyk (1905–1991), writer (Indo father, Dutch mother)

== Sports ==
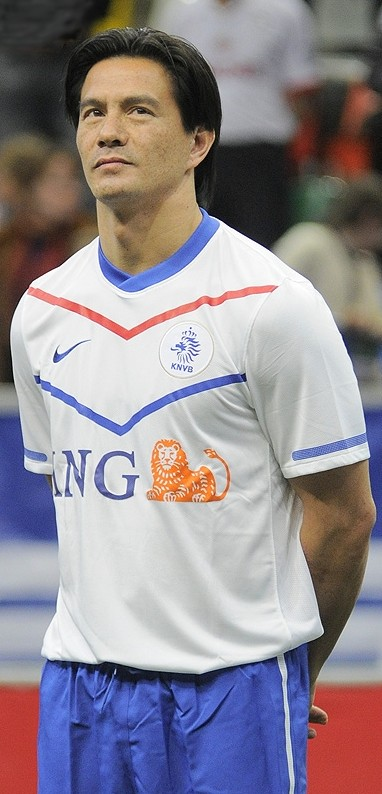
Michael Mols

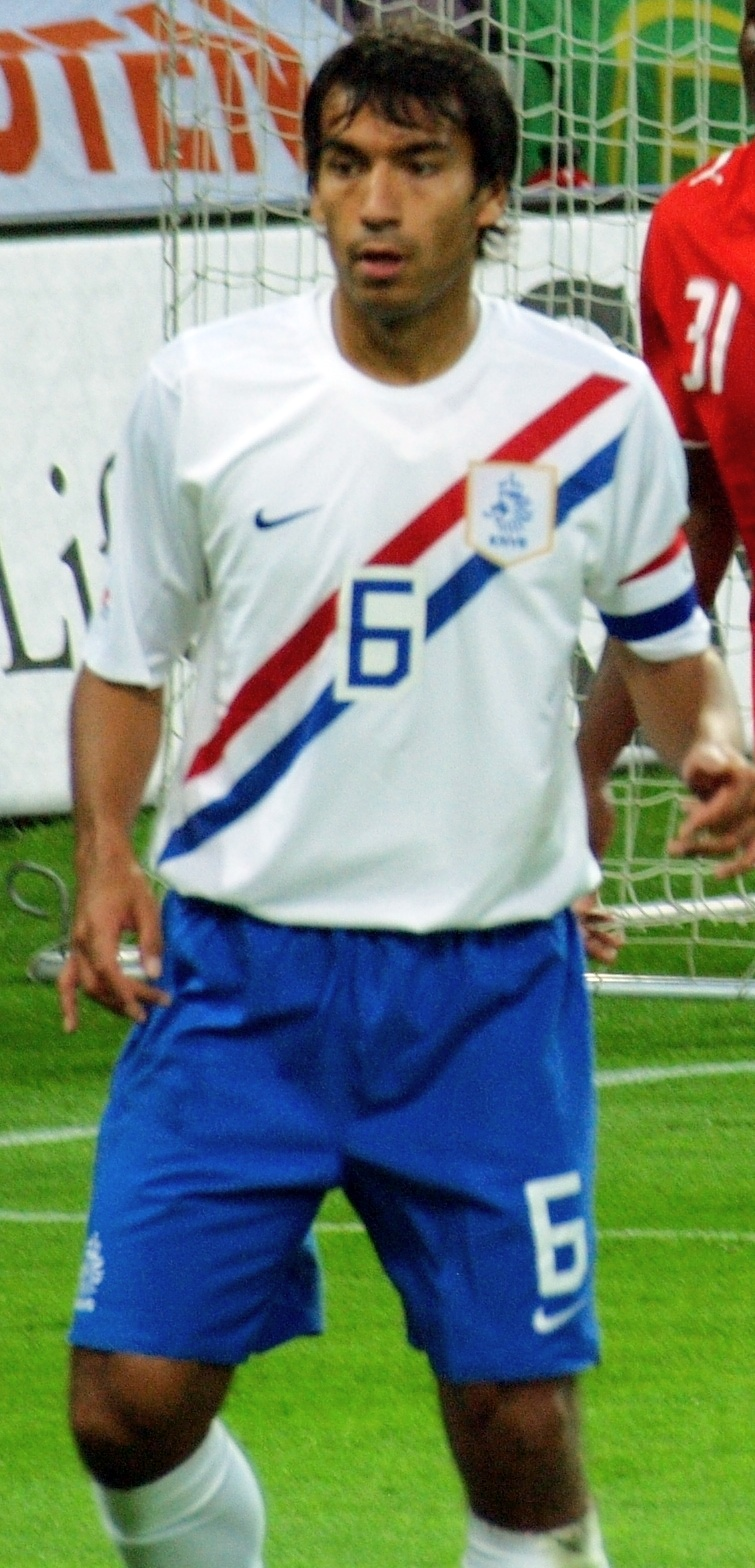
Giovanni van Bronckhorst

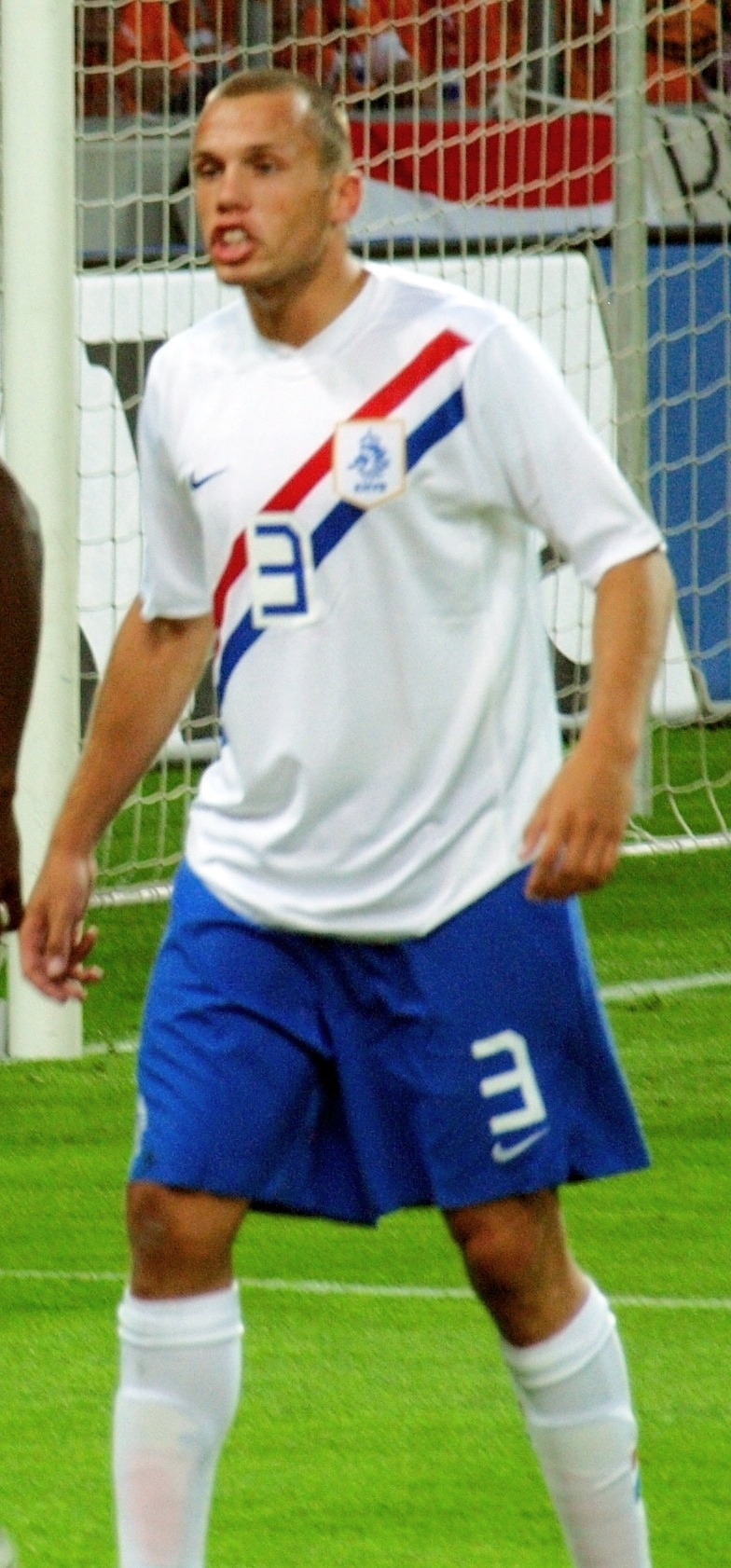
John Heitinga
- Wilfred Bouma, footballer
- Giovanni van Bronckhorst, footballer (Indo father, Moluccan mother)
- Lotte Bruil-Jonathans, badminton player
- Charles van Commenee, athletics
- Sergio van Dijk, footballer
- John Heitinga, footballer
- Jesse Huta Galung, tennis player (Batak father)
- Nigel de Jong, footballer
- Jelle Klaasen, darts player
- Ranomi Kromowidjojo, swimmer (Javanese father from Suriname, Dutch mother)
- Denny Landzaat, footballer
- Roy Makaay, footballer
- Judith Meulendijks, badminton player
- Michael Mols, footballer
- Jason Oost, footballer
- Robin van Persie, footballer
- Bobby Petta, footballer
- Paatje Phefferkorn, pencak silat master
- Jaïro Riedewald, footballer
- Manuel Schenkhuizen, professional StarCraft II player
- Sonny Silooy, footballer
- Ferry Sonneville, badminton player
- Nyck de Vries, racing driver
- Demy de Zeeuw, footballer
- Tijjani Reijnders, footballer (Dutch father, Moluccan mother)
- Eliano Reijnders, footballer (Dutch father, Moluccan mother)
- Arianne Hartono, tennis player
- Jayden Oosterwolde, footballer

== Politics ==
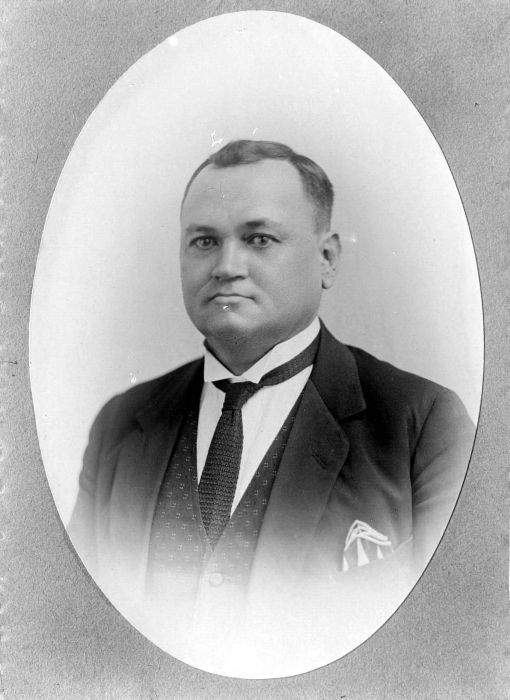
Dick de Hoog

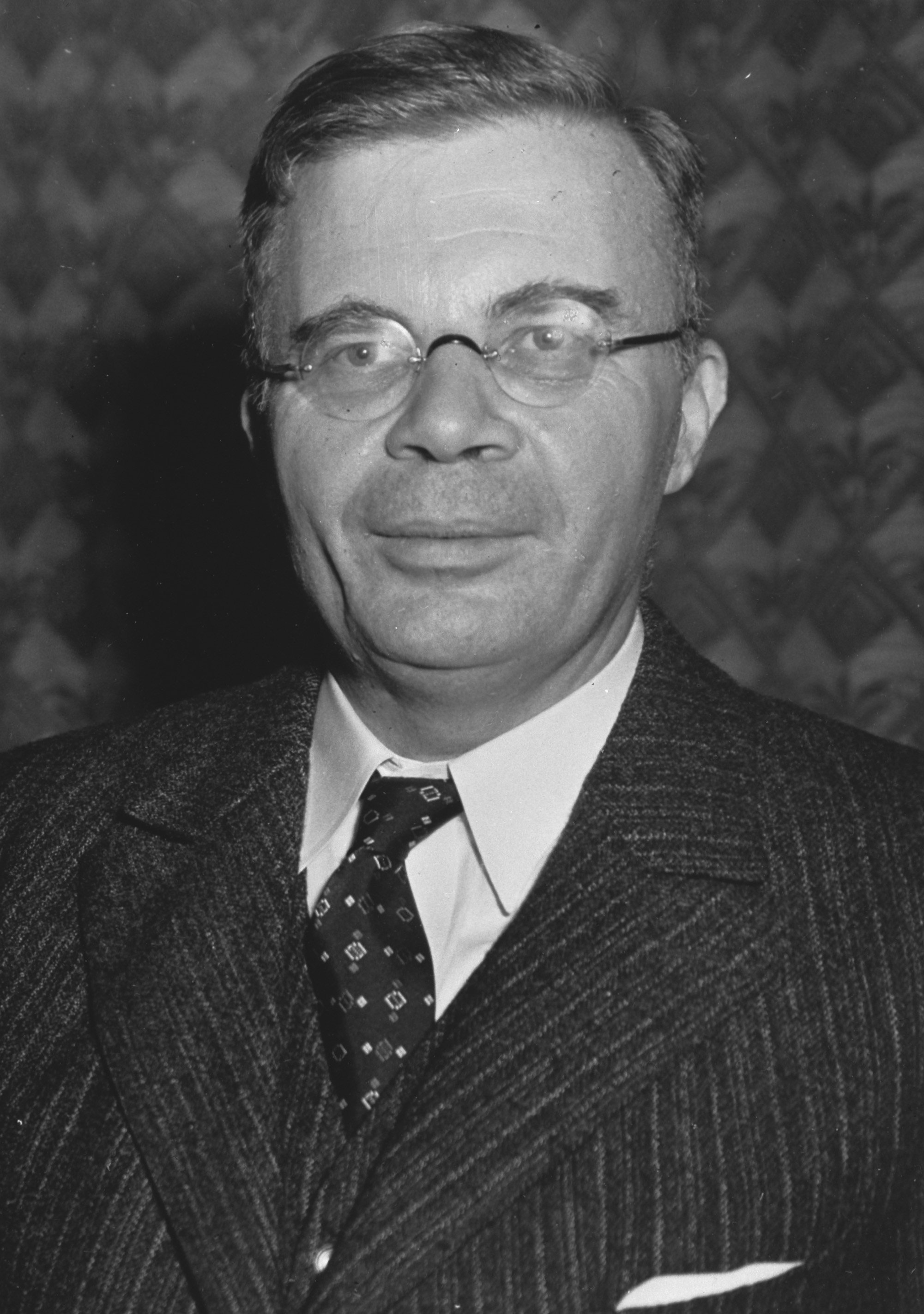
Hubertus Van Mook
- P.F.Dahler, politician and activist
- Dick de Hoog, politician
- Ernest Douwes Dekker, politician and activist
- Loa Sek Hie, colonial politician, community leader and landlord
- Winnie Sorgdrager, politician
- Mark Rutte, politician
- Geert Wilders, politician
- Thierry Baudet, politician
- Karel Zaalberg (1873-1928), journalist, politician
- Hubertus van Mook (1894-1965), former governor-general of the Dutch East Indies

== Film and television ==
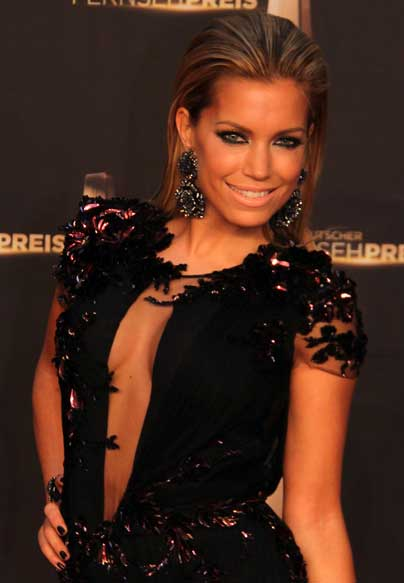
Sylvie Meis

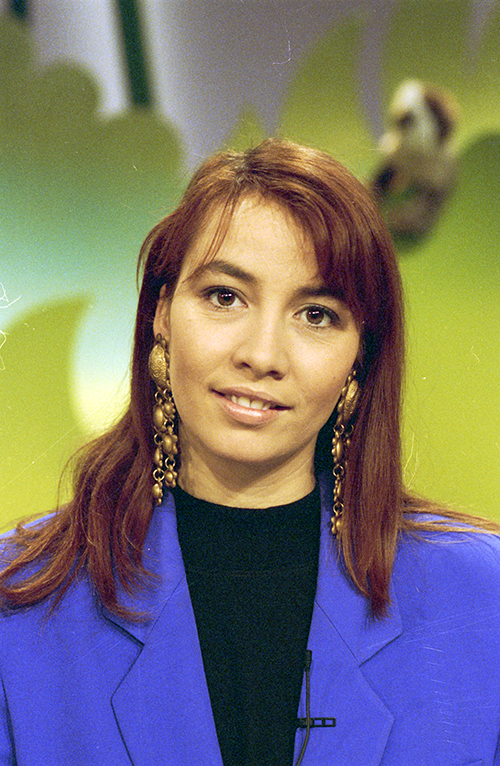
Nada van Nie

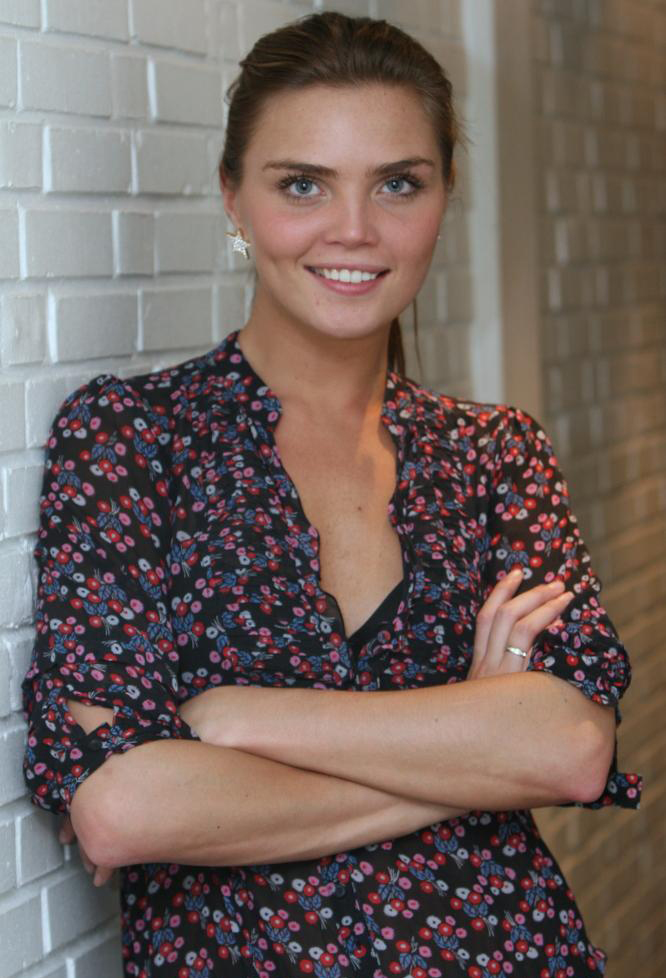
Kim Feenstra
- Caro van Eyck (1915-1979), actress
- Kim Feenstra, model, TV personality
- Laura Gemser (born 1950), actress
- Mark-Paul Gosselaar, actor
- Michelle Hunziker, actor
- Sylvie Meis (formerly van der Vaart), TV presenter, model (Indo father, Dutch mother)
- Georgina Verbaan (born 1979), actress
- Marcus Schenkenberg van Mierop (born 1968) Supermodel, singer, actor, writer, TV personality (indo father, Dutch mother)

== Arts ==
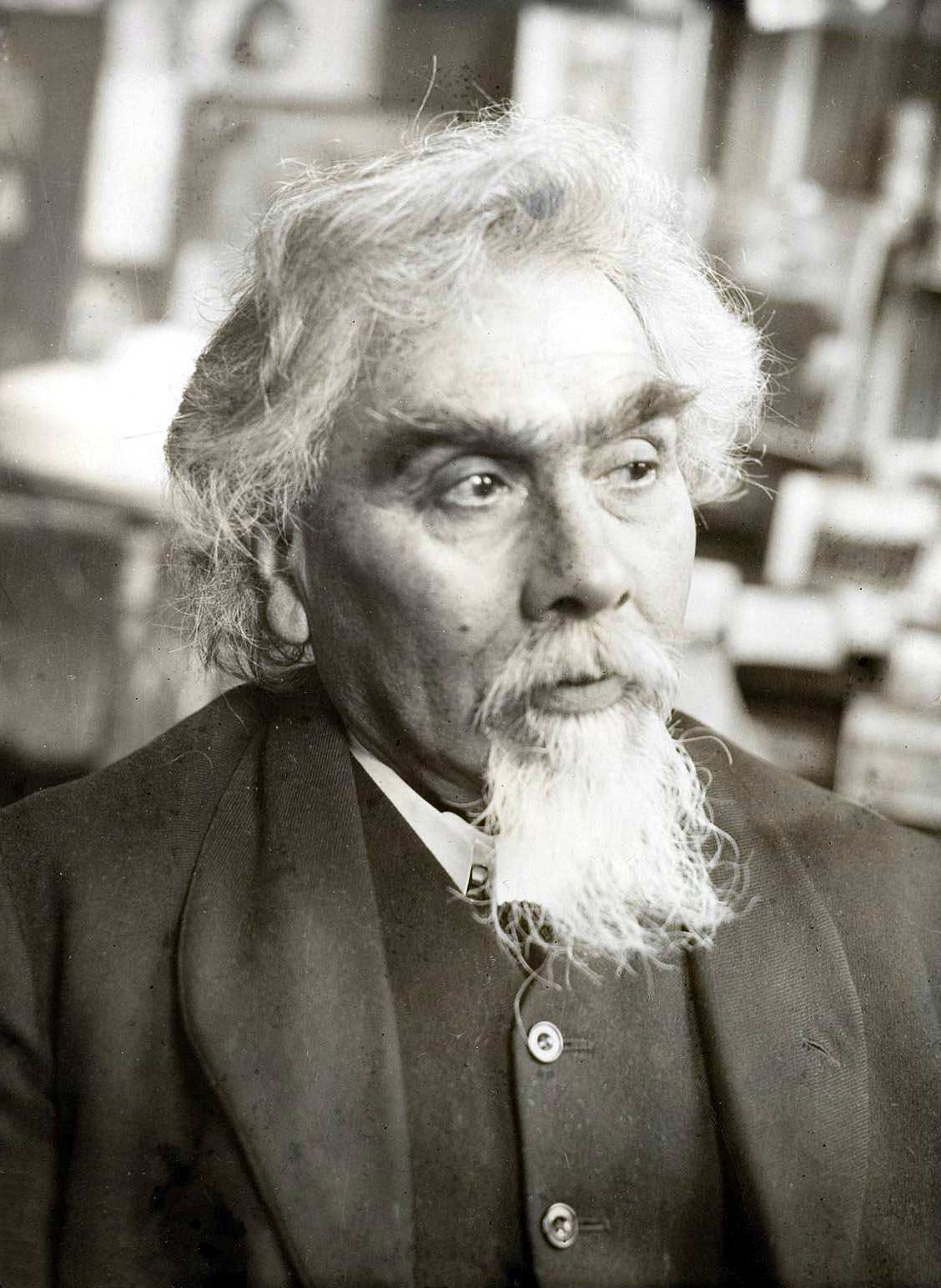
Jan Toorop
- Johannes Evert Hendrik Akkeringa (1861–1942), painter
- Eppo Doeve, painter
- Charley Toorop (1891-1951), artist
- Jan Toorop (1858-1928), painter

== Military ==
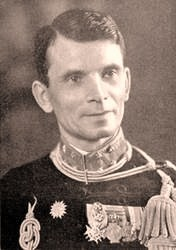
Gerardus Johannes Berenschot

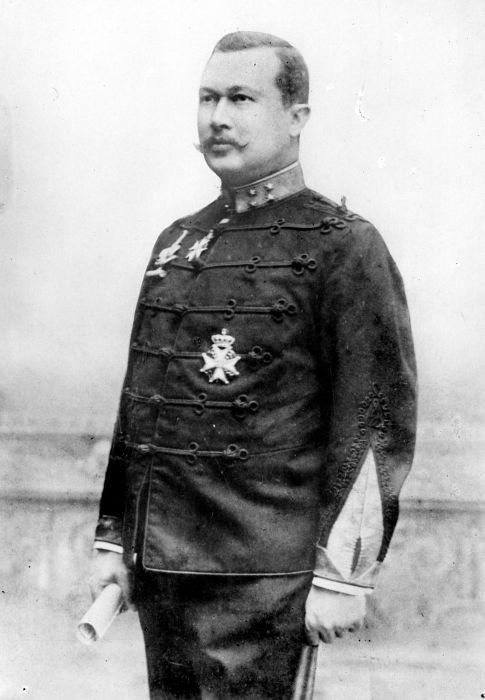
Gotfried Coenraad Ernst van Daalen

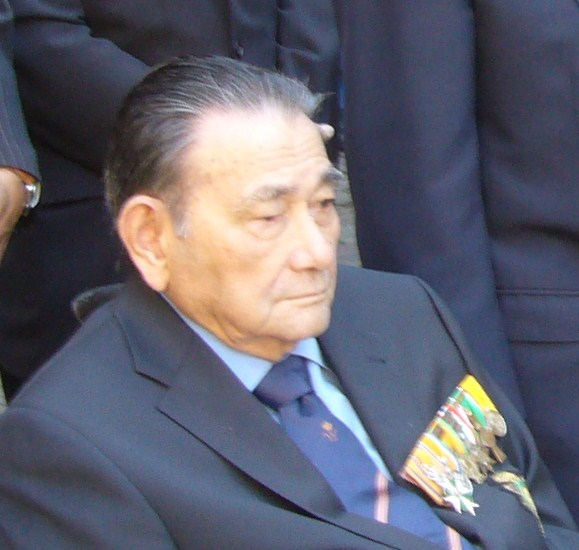
Giovanni Narcis Hakkenberg

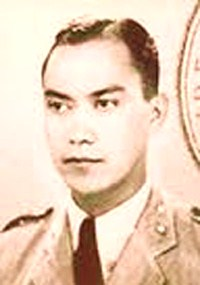
Jacob Pieter van Helsdingen
- Gerardus Johannes Berenschot (1887-1941), KNIL general and commander in chief
- Gotfried Coenraad Ernst van Daalen (1863-1930), KNIL general and commander in chief
- Giovanni Narcis Hakkenberg (1923-2013), decorated war hero, Knight 4th Class of the William Order
- Jacob Pieter van Helsdingen (1907-1942), decorated war hero, Knight 3rd Class of the William Order

== Miscellaneous ==
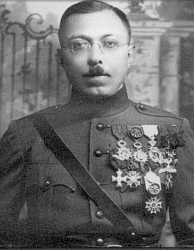
Louis Grondijs, honorary captain of the French Army

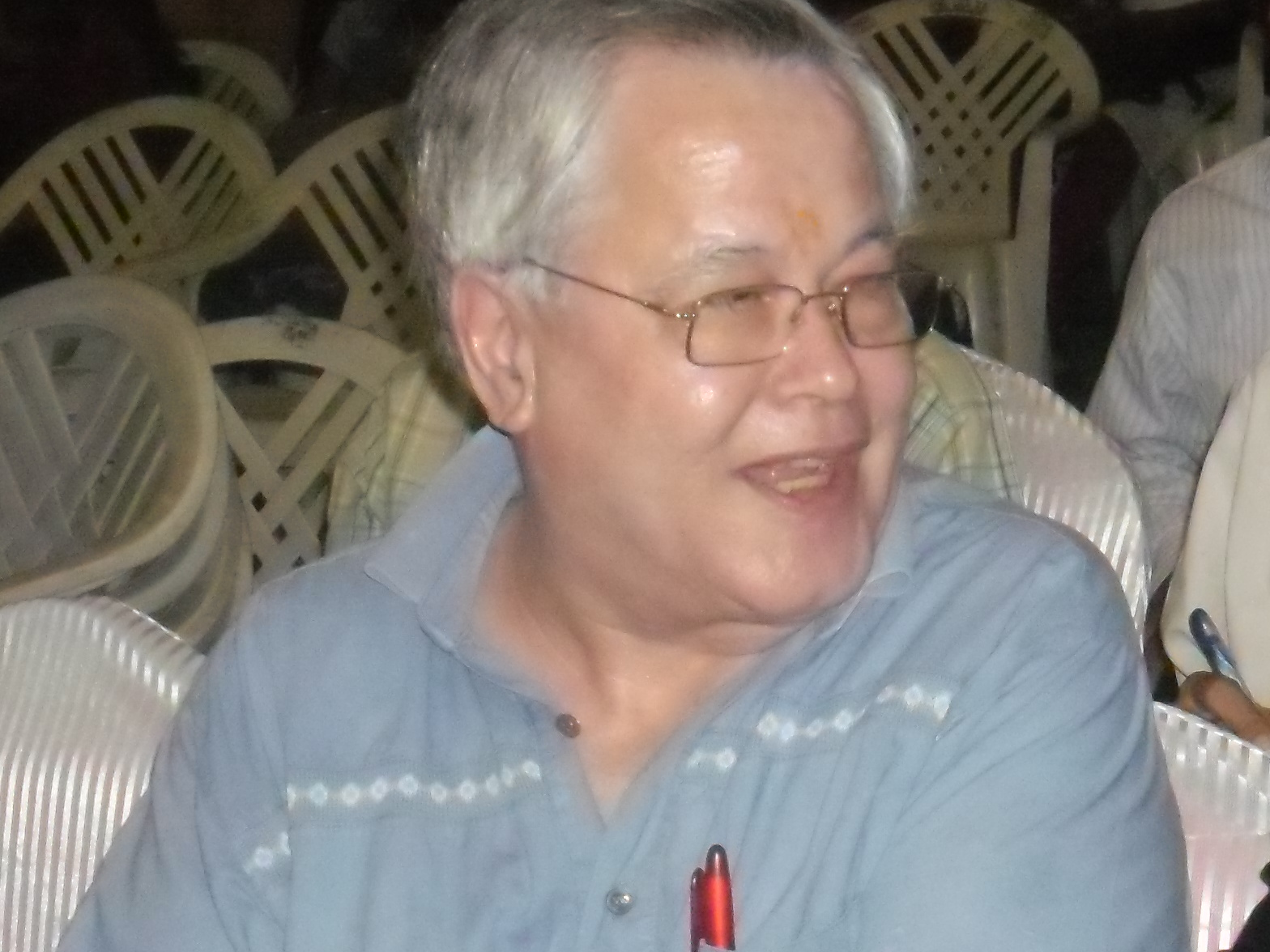
Vic Hayes, godfather of Wifi
- Carel Birnie, co-founder Dutch Dance Theatre
- Louis Grondijs (1878-1961), academic and war correspondent
- Vic Hayes, engineer
- Jan Hilgers (1886-1945), aviator
- Emile Ratelband, guru, politician
- Ian Messing, CET, Crew Chief, Inspector
