= Nikolai Zherdev =

Russian ice hockey player (born 1984)

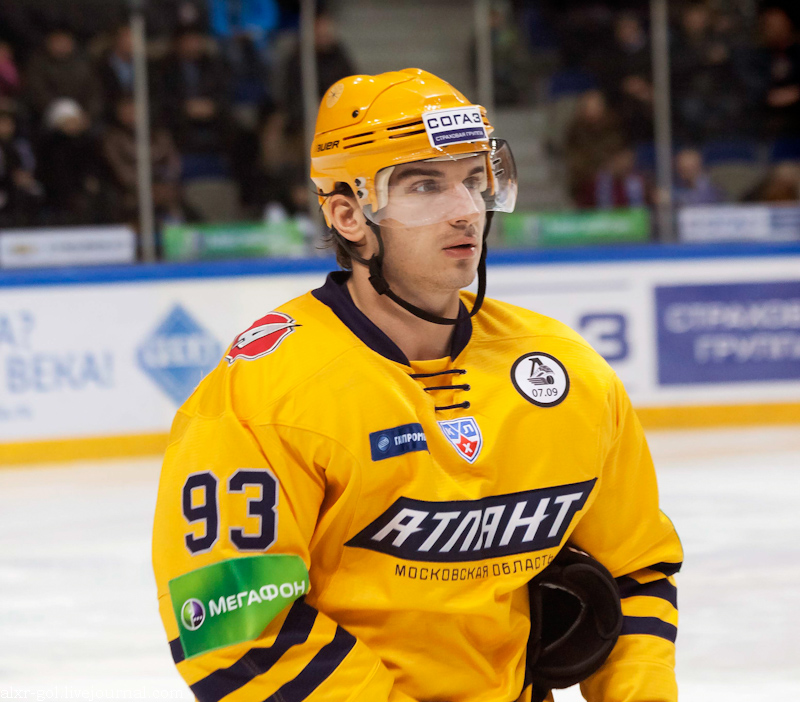
- Zherdev with Atlant Moscow Oblast in 2011
- Born: November 5, 1984 (age 41) Kiev, Ukrainian SSR, Soviet Union
- Height: 6 ft 2 in (188 cm)
- Weight: 203 lb (92 kg; 14 st 7 lb)
- Position: Right wing
- Shot: Right
- IHL team Former teams: Alleghe: CSKA Moscow; Columbus Blue Jackets; Syracuse Crunch; Atlant Moscow Oblast; New York Rangers; Philadelphia Flyers; Ak Bars Kazan; Spartak Moscow; Severstal Cherepovets; Dynamo Moscow; Sochi; Torpedo Nizhny Novgorod; Neftekhimik Nizhnekamsk; Dinamo Riga; Ryazan; Bratislava Capitals; Merano
- National team: Russia
- NHL draft: 4th overall, 2003; Columbus Blue Jackets
- Playing career: 2002–2025

Nikolai Zherdev (Russian: Николай Олегович Жердев; born November 5, 1984) is a Russian professional ice hockey right winger.

He previously played in the National Hockey League (NHL) for the Columbus Blue Jackets, New York Rangers and Philadelphia Flyers.

== Playing career ==
=== Early career ===
Born in Kyiv, Ukraine, Zherdev began playing hockey at the age of four. He began his training with the Sokil Kyiv junior hockey affiliate. Due to complications with organizing a team for his age group, he was pushed to play a year ahead with the 1983 born players; a group which included fellow future Ukrainian NHLer Anton Babchuk. Zherdev played in the 1998 Quebec International Pee-Wee Hockey Tournament with his youth team from Kyiv. While playing in the tournament, Zherdev's team found itself competing against a team from Elektrostal, Russia. The rival team's coach, Ravil Iskhakov, took note of both Zherdev and Babchuk, and invited the pair to further their development with the Elemash Elektrostal hockey club of the Russian Major League, to which they accepted together. The desire to play at a higher level came at a price: his nationality. In order to play in Russia, he would be forced to apply for Russian citizenship.

=== CSKA Moscow ===
As his game progressed and professional teams began to take notice, Elektrostal received offers from the likes of Lokomotiv Yaroslavl, Ak Bars Kazan, and CSKA Moscow for Zherdev's services. He would accept an invitation for Elektrostal to loan him to the latter team, CSKA, citing a desire to train under esteemed coach Viktor Tikhonov.

Zherdev spent the entire 2002–03 season with CSKA. He left for the NHL halfway through the 2003–04 season. He would, however, return to the Russian club during the 2004–05 NHL lockout.

=== Columbus Blue Jackets ===
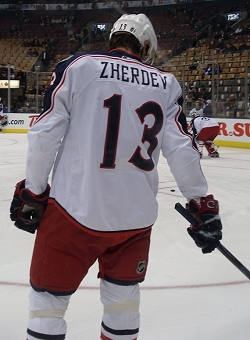
Zherdev with the Columbus Blue Jackets in 2008

Zherdev was drafted by Columbus in the 2003 NHL entry draft with the fourth overall pick. At the time, Columbus general manager Doug MacLean stated that the team had Zherdev ranked number one on their draft list.

The 2005–06 NHL season was a breakout year for Zherdev, who scored 27 goals and notched 27 assists in 73 games. He was the Blue Jackets' most potent offensive threat while Rick Nash recuperated from injury, and played most of the season on the team's first line.

The 2006–07 NHL season was a low point for Zherdev, as he struggled to score consistently and frequently clashed with the Jackets' coaching staff, leading to repeated rumors that he might be traded before the 2007–08 NHL season began. In response, Blue Jackets General Manager Scott Howson and then-coach Ken Hitchcock met Zherdev in a "clean-the-slate" meeting. Following the meeting, Zherdev rediscovered success on the ice.

==== Contract dispute ====
Contract negotiations with Blue Jackets management following the 2005–06 season became acrimonious. Zherdev threatened to remain in Russia for the season unless his demands were met, while Columbus insisted that Zherdev's salary demands were not commensurate with his accomplishments. On September 28, 2006, the parties finally agreed to a $7.5 million, three-year contract.

=== New York Rangers ===
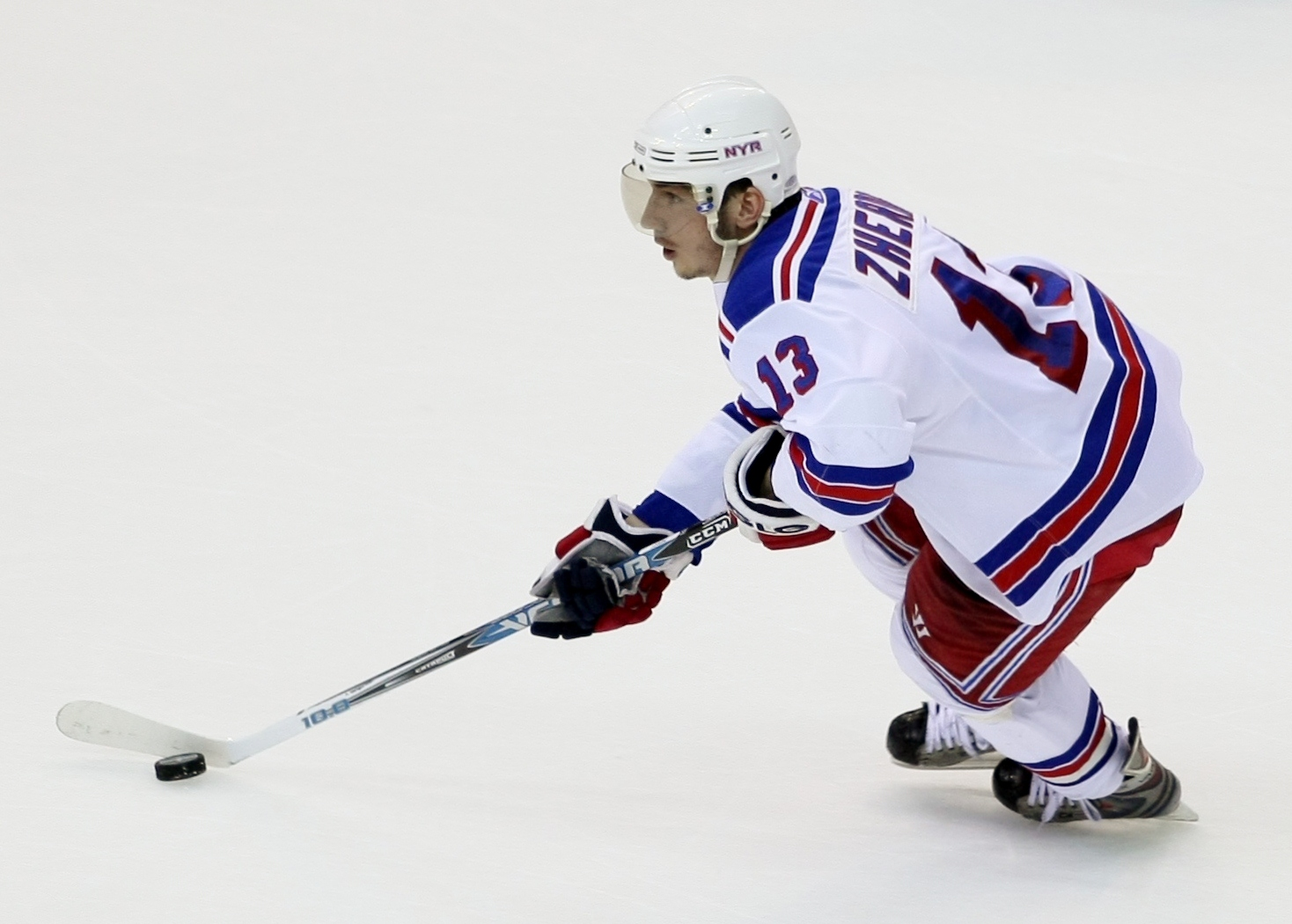
Zherdev with the Rangers in 2009

On July 2, 2008, Zherdev was traded by the Blue Jackets along with Dan Fritsche to the New York Rangers for defencemen Fedor Tyutin and Christian Bäckman. In his first season with the Rangers, Zherdev tied for the team lead in points with Scott Gomez, scoring 58 points.

As a restricted free agent, Zherdev was tendered a qualifying offer of $3.25 million by the Rangers before the start of the 2009 free agency period so the team could retain his rights as the two sides negotiate. Zherdev was awarded $3.9 million (USD) in arbitration, however, the New York Rangers chose to let Zherdev go.

=== KHL ===
The aforementioned walkaway made Zherdev an unrestricted free agent. Zherdev signed on September 15, 2009, a one-year contract for Atlant Moscow Oblast.

=== NHL return ===
On July 9, 2010, Zherdev signed a one-year deal for $2 million with the Philadelphia Flyers, setting up his return to the NHL. This NHL stint would last 56 games through one season as Zherdev did not garner the trust of Flyers head coach Peter Laviolette due to what the coach saw as lackadaisical effort and selfish play. For the majority of the season, Zherdev received limited ice time while playing the fourth line with very offensively limited linemates and rarely saw any power play time. Despite the lack of opportunities, Zherdev would manage a productive 16 goals, which included his 100th NHL goal. After the season the Flyers did not attempt to sign him to a contract extension.

=== Back to KHL ===
Following the 2010–11 season, Zherdev returned to Atlant Moscow Oblast. In the 2012–13, he was announced as the team Captain. He played in 39 games registering an impressive 37 points before he was traded to Ak Bars Kazan on January 15, 2013, to complete the season.

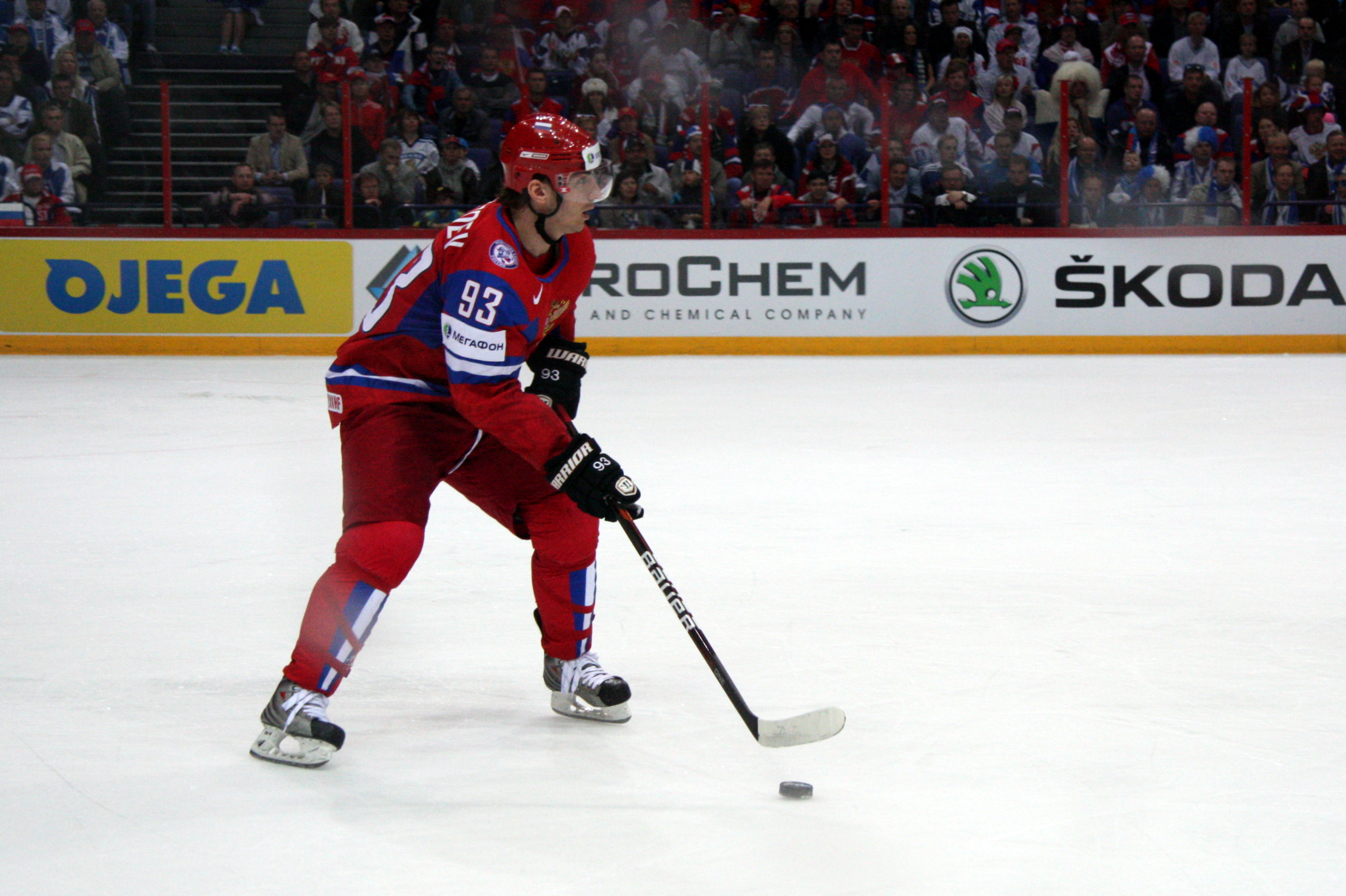
- Zherdev representing Russia in 2012

Medal record

Representing Russia

Men's ice hockey

World Championships
Gold medal – first place	2009 Switzerland	
Gold medal – first place	2012 Finland/Sweden	

World Junior Championships
Gold medal – first place	2003 Canada	

World Under-18 Championships
Silver medal – second place	2002 Slovakia	

After signing a one-year deal with HC Lev Praha in July 2013, Zherdev celebrated at the Barvikha Luxury Village hotel in Moscow where things turned violent, according to a Russian news report. Zherdev allegedly initiated a bar brawl at the hotel before crashing his Bentley Continental GT, which was later vandalized by locals who were outraged with his behaviour and scratched the words "scum", "bastard", and others into the vehicle's paint with nails. Damage to the vehicle was allegedly valued at $30,000. Barvikha Luxury Village hotel staff also claimed Zherdev spent nights there with various women, prompting his wife, Eugenia, to file for divorce. Zherdev also lost his passport as a result of the incident, meaning that he could not fly to his new team's training camp in Finland.

He was released from his contract with Lev and on September 24, 2013, he was signed to a one-year contract with HC Spartak Moscow. After failing to score a goal in 16 games with the club, he was released by the team in mid-November before accepting a short-term deal with HC Severstal.

On July 14, 2014, Zherdev continued his journeyman career, in agreeing to a one-year contract with HC Dynamo Moscow for the 2014–15 season.

In August 2017, Zherdev signed a one-year contract with Russian KHL team Neftekhimik Nizhnekamsk. He played two games for Neftekhimik Nizhnekamsk before leaving the team for Latvian KHL team Dinamo Riga. In January 2018, the contract was terminated by mutual agreement.

Zherdev did not play during the 2018–19 season. In the 2019–20 season, Zherdev played for HC Ryazan of the VHL. In October 2019, the contract was terminated by mutual agreement. Zherdev did not play during the 2020–21 season.

For the 2021–22 season, Zherdev signed a one-year contract with the Bratislava Capitals of the ICE Hockey League. After the successive deaths of a Bratislava player Boris Sádecký and the team's vice president, the club dissolved and did not play for the remainder of the season. Zherdev then moved to Merano of the Alps Hockey League; his departure from the team was announced in July 2022. Zherdev began the 2022–23 season playing for Yunost Minsk of the Belarusian Extraleague. In October 2022, Zherdev moved to Dinamo-Molodechno, also of the Belarusian Extraleague. Dinamo-Molodechno terminated his contract in March 2023. For the 2023–24 season, Zherdev signed to Alleghe Hockey of the Italian Hockey League.

== International play ==
Nikolai Zherdev represented Russia at the 2002 U-18 World Junior Championships, helping that country to a silver medal. He finished the tournament with 6 goals, 5 assists, 11 points in 8 games (third best on his team, behind only Alexander Ovechkin and Alexander Semin).

Zherdev also played at the 2003 U-20 World Junior Championships, registering only one assist in six games, playing a minor role in Russia's quest for the gold medal.

He was named captain of Team Russia for the 2004 World Juniors, but did not play after departing for the NHL.

== Personal life ==
Zherdev is fluent in Ukrainian and Russian, and can speak limited English. In 2023 he married Maria Kirilenko. In November 2024, the couple had a daughter.

== Career statistics ==
=== Regular season and playoffs ===
			Regular season					Playoffs
Season	Team	League	GP	G	A	Pts	PIM	GP	G	A	Pts	PIM
1999–2000	Elemash–2 Elektrostal	RUS.3	21	10	7	17	26	7	0	0	0	0
2000–01	Elemash Elektrostal	RUS.2	18	6	8	14	12	—	—	—	—	—
2001–02	Elemash–2 Elektrostal	RUS.3	1	1	0	1	4	—	—	—	—	—
2001–02	Elemash Elektrostal	RUS.2	53	13	15	28	62	—	—	—	—	—
2002–03	CSKA Moscow	RSL	44	12	12	24	34	—	—	—	—	—
2003–04	CSKA Moscow	RSL	20	2	2	4	14	—	—	—	—	—
2003–04	Columbus Blue Jackets	NHL	57	13	21	34	54	—	—	—	—	—
2004–05	CSKA Moscow	RSL	51	19	21	40	62	—	—	—	—	—
2005–06	Columbus Blue Jackets	NHL	73	27	27	54	50	—	—	—	—	—
2005–06	Syracuse Crunch	AHL	2	1	0	1	0	—	—	—	—	—
2006–07	Khimik Moscow Oblast	RSL	8	2	4	6	10	—	—	—	—	—
2006–07	Columbus Blue Jackets	NHL	71	10	22	32	26	—	—	—	—	—
2007–08	Columbus Blue Jackets	NHL	82	26	35	61	34	—	—	—	—	—
2008–09	New York Rangers	NHL	82	23	35	58	39	7	0	0	0	2
2009–10	Atlant Moscow Oblast	KHL	52	13	26	39	79	4	0	1	1	4
2010–11	Philadelphia Flyers	NHL	56	16	6	22	22	8	1	2	3	2
2011–12	Atlant Moscow Oblast	KHL	35	9	16	29	60	4	0	1	1	4
2012–13	Atlant Moscow Oblast	KHL	39	13	24	37	20	—	—	—	—	—
2012–13	Ak Bars Kazan	KHL	11	2	4	6	9	18	2	6	8	0
2013–14	Spartak Moscow	KHL	16	0	7	7	2	—	—	—	—	—
2013–14	Severstal Cherepovets	KHL	17	3	3	6	26	—	—	—	—	—
2014–15	Dynamo Moscow	KHL	47	6	16	22	38	2	0	1	1	2
2015–16	HC Sochi	KHL	26	3	4	7	12	—	—	—	—	—
2015–16	Torpedo Nizhny Novgorod	KHL	23	4	10	14	8	11	3	2	5	20
2016–17	Torpedo Nizhny Novgorod	KHL	54	8	21	29	24	3	0	0	0	0
2017–18	Neftekhimik Nizhnekamsk	KHL	2	0	1	1	6	—	—	—	—	—
2017–18	Dinamo Riga	KHL	18	3	2	5	4	—	—	—	—	—
2018–19	Did not play
2019–20	HC Ryazan	VHL	9	0	2	2	0	—	—	—	—	—
2020–21	Did not play
2021–22	Bratislava Capitals	ICEHL	12	1	6	7	2	—	—	—	—	—
RSL totals			123	35	39	74	120	—	—	—	—	—
NHL totals			421	115	146	261	225	15	1	2	3	4
KHL totals			358	71	142	213	302	50	8	11	19	56

=== International ===
Year	Team	Event	Result	GP	G	A	Pts	PIM
2002	Russia	U17	6th	5	1	4	5	6
2002	Russia	WJC18	2nd place, silver medalist(s)	8	6	5	11	22
2003	Russia	WJC	1st place, gold medalist(s)	6	0	1	1	2
2009	Russia	WC	1st place, gold medalist(s)	3	0	1	1	0
2012	Russia	WC	1st place, gold medalist(s)	10	2	4	6	2
Junior totals				19	7	10	17	30
Senior totals				13	2	5	7	2

== Awards and achievements ==
- 2003–04: Played in the NHL YoungStars Game

Awards and achievements
Preceded by Rick Nash	Columbus Blue Jackets first-round draft pick 2003	Succeeded by Alexandre Picard
