= Bratislava Capitals =

- City: Bratislava, Slovakia
- League: ICE Hockey League (2020–2022)
- Founded: 2015
- Dissolved: 2022
- Home arena: Ondrej Nepela Arena (capacity 10,055)
- Colours: Red, white, black, grey
- Website: www.iclinic-capitals.sk

The Bratislava Capitals were a professional Slovak ice hockey club based in Bratislava, Slovakia. They were established as HC Bratislava in 2015 and played five seasons in the Slovak hockey system before switching to the Austrian ICE Hockey League in 2020. After two seasons in the ICE Hockey League the club ceased operations in 2022.

== Early years ==
HC Bratislava was established in 2015 in response to the lack of a Bratislava senior team in Slovak competitions. In its first season in the third-tier second league, it finished 12th out of 16 teams. In the 2016–17 season, the club found a stable home in Vladimír Dzurilla Arena in Ružinov. The club stabilized, established itself in the second hockey league and finished fourth out of 20 teams. In 2019, ahead of the 2019–20 season, the club went through a complete rebranding, changing its name to the Bratislava Capitals, as well as making changes to their logo, uniforms, head coach and playing squad. There was also a change to their home arena, with the club starting to play its home games at Ondrej Nepela Arena.

== Austrian League ==
After the 2019–20 season, the Capitals were accepted to play in the Austrian-based bet-at-home ICE Hockey League (formerly the Erste Bank Eishockey Liga) on 24 April 2020 beginning in the 2020–21 season.

On October 30, 2021, player Boris Sádecký collapsed during a game, reportedly due to cardiac arrest, and died three days later. On November 5, the team's general manager Dušan Pašek was found dead from suicide. Following the incidents, the club suspended its season after 14 games, but announced its return for the 2022–23 season in May 2022. In spite of their plans to return, the club confirmed in July 2022 that they were terminating their activities.

== NHL alumni ==
- (Slovakia) Stanislav Gron (2016–2018)
- (Canada) Eric Selleck (2019–2020)
- (Canada) Matt Climie (2019–2020)
- (Belarus) Sergei Kostitsyn (2020–2021)
- (Canada) Jared Coreau (2020–2021)
- (Canada) Brett Carson (2020–2021)
- (Russia) Nikolay Zherdev (2021–2022)
