= Pandu War Cemetery =

Dutch war cemetery in Bandung, Indonesia

Dutch Field of Honor Pandu
- Nederlands Ereveld Pandu; Makam Kehormatan Belanda di Pandu
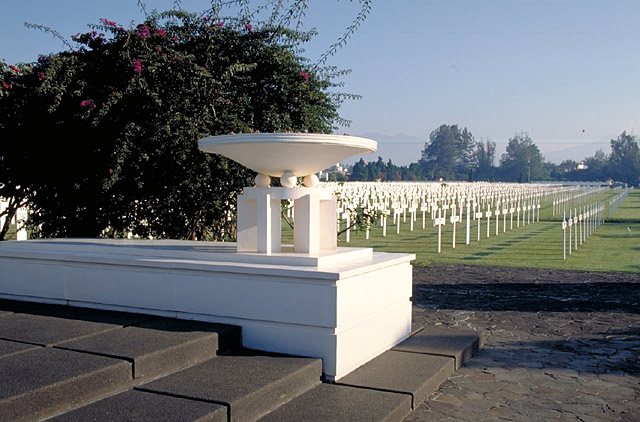
- Pandu War Cemetery
- Interactive map of Dutch Field of Honor Pandu

Details
- Location: Bandung, West Java
- Country: Indonesia
- Coordinates: 6°53′59″S 107°35′31″E
- Type: War cemetery
- Owned by: Netherlands War Graves Foundation
- No. of graves: 4,000

Pandu War Cemetery, also known as the Dutch Field of Honor Pandu (Dutch: Nederlands Ereveld Pandu, Indonesian: Makam Kehormatan Belanda di Pandu), is a war cemetery in Bandung, West Java, in Indonesia.

The cemetery has 4,000 graves. Most of the graves belong to Dutch civilian war victims and prisoners of war from Japanese-run internment camps who were killed by their captors during the fall of Japan in 1945. At the highest point of the cemetery stands a flag pole with at its base the place names where most people were killed. Lt. Gen. Berenschot, who died in an aircraft crash before the Japanese invasion of the Dutch East Indies, is also buried here.

There are two monuments on the cemetery, one for all the unidentified civilian war victims and one for all the unknown soldiers who are buried there.

== Notable burials ==
- Gerardus Johannes Berenschot (1887–1941)
- L. E. Lanjouw (1896–1942)
- Charles Prosper Wolff Schoemaker (1882–1949)
