= Dušan Pašek (ice hockey, born 1985) =

Slovak ice hockey player (1985–2021)

- Born: 18 January 1985 Bratislava, Czechoslovakia
- Died: 5 November 2021 (aged 36) Bratislava, Slovakia
- Height: 5 ft 11 in (180 cm)
- Weight: 183 lb (83 kg; 13 st 1 lb)
- Position: Forward
- Shot: Left
- Played for: HC Slovan Bratislava; HK 36 Skalica; HC Košice; ŠHK 37 Piešťany; HC ’05 Banská Bystrica
- Playing career: 2003–2016

Dušan Pašek (1985–2021) was a Slovak professional ice hockey player who played in the Slovak Extraliga for HC Slovan Bratislava and represented Slovakia on four occasions. His other clubs included HK 36 Skalica, where he spent three years. From 2010 he played for HC Košice, where he won two Extraliga titles. Pašek died on 5 November 2021 in Koliba, Bratislava, during his time as a club official for Bratislava Capitals. His suicide, at age 36, came only two days after the death of fellow club player Boris Sádecký. In 1998, Pašek's father, Dušan, had died as result of suicide, at the age of 37.
