= Brett Carson =

Canadian ice hockey player (born 1985)

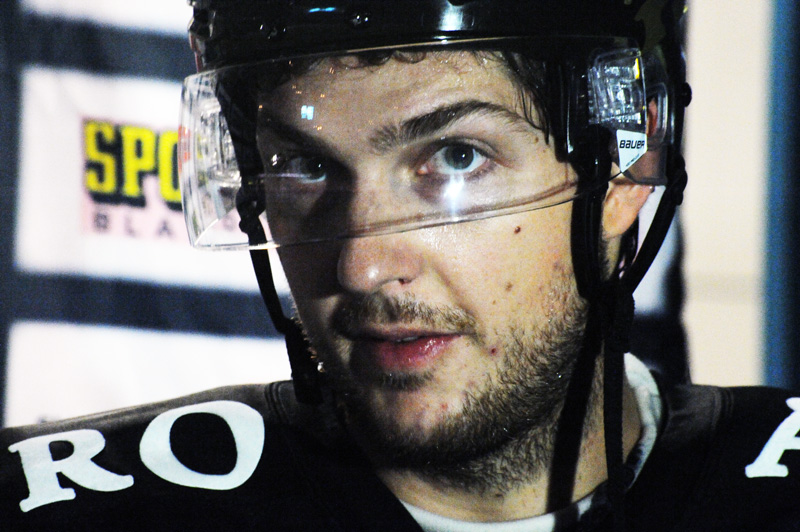
- Born: November 29, 1985 (age 40) Regina, Saskatchewan, Canada
- Height: 6 ft 4 in (193 cm)
- Weight: 220 lb (100 kg; 15 st 10 lb)
- Position: Defence
- Shot: Right
- Played for: Carolina Hurricanes; Calgary Flames; AIK IF; Vienna Capitals; SaiPa; KooKoo; HC Slovan Bratislava; Bratislava Capitals; Lausitzer Füchse
- NHL draft: 109th overall, 2004; Carolina Hurricanes
- Playing career: 2006–2022

Brett Carson (born November 29, 1985) is a Canadian ice hockey scout and former professional ice hockey defenceman who is an amateur scout for the Nashville Predators.

He previously played in the National Hockey League (NHL) with the Carolina Hurricanes and the Calgary Flames.

== Playing career ==
Carson began his junior hockey career with the Moose Jaw Warriors of the Western Hockey League (WHL), but was sent to the Calgary Hitmen midway through his first full season of 2002–03. Carson was invited to participate in the CHL Top Prospects Game in his draft year of 2003–04, during which he won the fastest skater event of the game's skills competition. At the 2004 NHL entry draft, he was selected by the Carolina Hurricanes in the fourth round, 109th overall. He remained with the Hitmen for two additional seasons. He was Calgary's captain in 2005–06, led the team with 40 points as a defenceman and was named a WHL East Division first-team all-star in a season where Calgary set a league record for fewest goals allowed in a 72-game season with 155.

Turning professional in 2006–07, Carson played three games with the ECHL's Florida Everblades before earning promotion to Carolina's top affiliate, the Albany River Rats of the American Hockey League (AHL). Remaining with Albany the following season, he led the team's defencemen with 24 points in 77 games. Carson made his NHL debut in 2008–09, playing his first of five games December 7, 2008, against the Washington Capitals. He spent the majority of the 2009–10 NHL season with Carolina, appearing in 54 games and recording 12 points. He scored his first NHL point on December 16, 2009, when he assisted on a Tuomo Ruutu goal against the Dallas Stars, and his first goal on January 10, 2010, against Pascal Leclaire of the Ottawa Senators.

Carson split much of 2010–11 between the Hurricanes and the AHL's Charlotte Checkers, but was claimed by the Calgary Flames off waivers on February 28, 2011. He appeared in only six games for the Flames, but was signed by the team to a two-year contract extension late in the year. He missed the first third of the 2011–12 season after suffering a back injury in summer training. He did not make his season debut with Calgary until December 14, 2011.

On September 8, 2013, he signed a one-year contract with AIK Stockholm of the Swedish Hockey League. In his first European season in 2013–14, Carson established a stay-at-home role with AIK, contributing with 3 goals and 10 points in 49 games from the blueline.

On July 9, 2014, Carson opted to leave the SHL and signed a one-year contract with Austrian club, the Vienna Capitals of the EBEL. In the 2014–15 season, Carson scored a team high 9 goals from the blueline with 24 points in 54 games. In the post-season, he helped Vienna reach the Championship finals.

On August 6, 2015, Carson moved to the Finnish Liiga as a free agent, securing a one-year deal with SaiPa.

== Career statistics ==
| | | | Regular season | | | | | Playoffs |
| Season | Team | League | GP | G | A | Pts | PIM | GP | G | A | Pts | PIM |
|---|---|---|---|---|---|---|---|---|---|---|---|---|
| 2001–02 | Yorkton Mallers AAA | SMHL | 41 | 16 | 37 | 53 | 32 | — | — | — | — | — |
| 2001–02 | Moose Jaw Warriors | WHL | 6 | 0 | 0 | 0 | 0 | 12 | 2 | 0 | 2 | 0 |
| 2002–03 | Moose Jaw Warriors | WHL | 28 | 1 | 4 | 5 | 28 | — | — | — | — | — |
| 2002–03 | Calgary Hitmen | WHL | 30 | 3 | 6 | 9 | 4 | 5 | 2 | 1 | 3 | 0 |
| 2003–04 | Calgary Hitmen | WHL | 71 | 5 | 27 | 32 | 49 | 7 | 0 | 0 | 0 | 6 |
| 2004–05 | Calgary Hitmen | WHL | 61 | 8 | 16 | 24 | 61 | 8 | 2 | 2 | 4 | 8 |
| 2005–06 | Calgary Hitmen | WHL | 72 | 11 | 29 | 40 | 62 | 13 | 1 | 6 | 7 | 20 |
| 2006–07 | Florida Everblades | ECHL | 3 | 1 | 1 | 2 | 0 | — | — | — | — | — |
| 2006–07 | Albany River Rats | AHL | 63 | 2 | 16 | 18 | 26 | 5 | 0 | 2 | 2 | 0 |
| 2007–08 | Albany River Rats | AHL | 77 | 2 | 22 | 24 | 32 | 7 | 1 | 3 | 4 | 11 |
| 2008–09 | Albany River Rats | AHL | 69 | 6 | 29 | 35 | 34 | — | — | — | — | — |
| 2008–09 | Carolina Hurricanes | NHL | 5 | 0 | 0 | 0 | 4 | — | — | — | — | — |
| 2009–10 | Albany River Rats | AHL | 14 | 3 | 8 | 11 | 0 | — | — | — | — | — |
| 2009–10 | Carolina Hurricanes | NHL | 54 | 2 | 10 | 12 | 12 | — | — | — | — | — |
| 2010–11 | Charlotte Checkers | AHL | 26 | 0 | 10 | 10 | 12 | — | — | — | — | — |
| 2010–11 | Carolina Hurricanes | NHL | 13 | 0 | 0 | 0 | 4 | — | — | — | — | — |
| 2010–11 | Calgary Flames | NHL | 6 | 0 | 0 | 0 | 0 | — | — | — | — | — |
| 2011–12 | Calgary Flames | NHL | 2 | 0 | 0 | 0 | 0 | — | — | — | — | — |
| 2011–12 | Abbotsford Heat | AHL | 34 | 2 | 6 | 8 | 10 | 3 | 0 | 0 | 0 | 2 |
| 2012–13 | Abbotsford Heat | AHL | 26 | 6 | 5 | 11 | 16 | — | — | — | — | — |
| 2012–13 | Calgary Flames | NHL | 10 | 0 | 1 | 1 | 0 | — | — | — | — | — |
| 2013–14 | AIK | SHL | 49 | 3 | 7 | 10 | 43 | — | — | — | — | — |
| 2014–15 | Vienna Capitals | AUT | 54 | 9 | 15 | 24 | 14 | 15 | 1 | 7 | 8 | 4 |
| 2015–16 | SaiPa | Liiga | 60 | 5 | 11 | 16 | 16 | 5 | 1 | 1 | 2 | 0 |
| 2016–17 | SaiPa | Liiga | 30 | 3 | 5 | 8 | 12 | — | — | — | — | — |
| 2017–18 | SaiPa | Liiga | 56 | 2 | 5 | 7 | 47 | 2 | 0 | 0 | 0 | 0 |
| 2018–19 | KooKoo | Liiga | 33 | 1 | 0 | 1 | 20 | — | — | — | — | — |
| 2019–20 | HC Slovan Bratislava | Slovak | 9 | 2 | 3 | 5 | 2 | — | — | — | — | — |
| 2020–21 | Bratislava Capitals | ICEHL | 10 | 0 | 1 | 1 | 4 | 5 | 0 | 0 | 0 | 2 |
| 2021–22 | Bratislava Capitals | ICEHL | 12 | 0 | 0 | 0 | 8 | — | — | — | — | — |
| 2021–22 | Lausitzer Füchse | GER.2 | 37 | 2 | 7 | 9 | 12 | — | — | — | — | — |
| AHL totals | | | 321 | 25 | 102 | 127 | 132 | 15 | 1 | 5 | 6 | 13 |
| NHL totals | | | 90 | 2 | 11 | 13 | 20 | — | — | — | — | — |
| Liiga totals | | | 179 | 11 | 21 | 32 | 95 | 7 | 1 | 1 | 2 | 0 |

== Awards and honours ==
| Award | Year |
WHL
| East First All-Star Team | 2006 |
