= Yuri Saukh =

Soviet footballer and Russian coach (1951–2021)

Personal information
- Full name: Yuri Vasilyevich Saukh
- Date of birth: September 14, 1951
- Place of birth: USSR
- Date of death: January 2, 2021 (aged 69)
- Position: Defender

Senior career*
Years	Team	Apps	(Gls)
1970	Stal Volgograd		
1972–1973	Barrikady Volgograd		
1974–1975	FC SKA Rostov-on-Don		
1976–1979	CSKA Moscow		
1980	FC Lokomotiv Moscow		
1981	FC Dynamo Stavropol		

International career
1976	USSR	2	(0)

Managerial career
- 2003: FC Reutov
- 2004–2007: FC Luch-Energiya Vladivostok (assistant)
- * Club domestic league appearances and goals

Yuri Vasilyevich Saukh (Russian: Юрий Васильевич Саух) (14 September 1951 – 2 January 2021) was a Soviet football player and Russian coach and manager.

== International career ==
Saukh made his debut for USSR on May 26, 1976 in a friendly against Hungary.
