= Miquel Ferrer =

Spanish footballer (1931–2021)

Personal information
- Full name: Miquel Ferrer i Aymamí
- Date of birth: 28 November 1931
- Place of birth: Les Borges del Camp, Spain
- Date of death: 2 January 2021 (aged 89)
- Place of death: Salou, Spain
- Position: Midfielder

Youth career
- 1945–1949: Barcelona

Senior career*
Years	Team	Apps	(Gls)
1949–1951	Condal		
1951–1952	Barcelona	2	(0)
1952–1954	Condal		
1954–1958	Real Oviedo		
- * Club domestic league appearances and goals

Miquel Ferrer i Aymamí (28 November 1931 – 2 January 2021) was a Spanish professional footballer. His professional career spanned through most of the 1950s, when he played as a midfielder.

== Club career ==
Barcelona was Ferrer's amateur team in 1948, when he was 16. From 1949 to 1951, he played for Condal. He first played professionally for Barcelona in 1951, starting his first match on 30 September of that year against Valencia CF. He only played two league games for Barcelona, but played 22 unofficial matches for the club.

In 1954, Ferrer joined Real Oviedo. He retired following the 1958 season at the age of 26. His best career performance was in 1957, when he scored 12 goals in the Segunda División.
