= Gerardus Johannes Berenschot =

Dutch general (1887–1941)

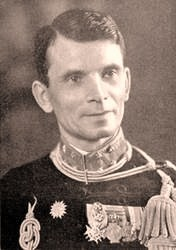
- General Gerardus Johannes Berenschot
- Born: 24 July 1887; Solok
- Died: 13 October 1941 (aged 54) Batavia (Jakarta)
- Allegiance: Netherlands
- Branch: Royal Netherlands East Indies Army (KNIL)
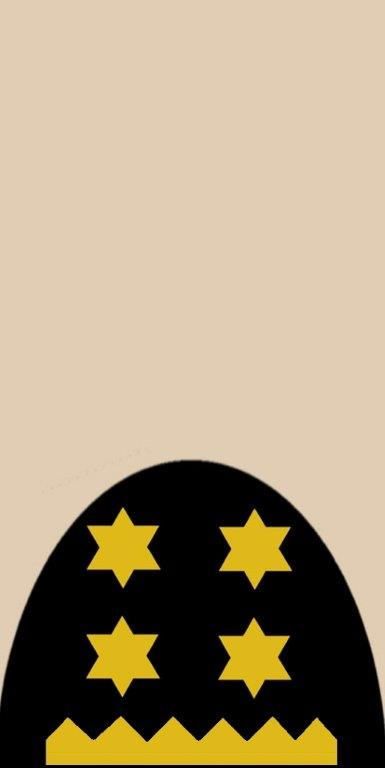
- Rank: Lt General, Commander of the KNIL
- Commands: Aceh War (1910-1915)
- Other work: Professor at the Military Academy (1925-1930)

Lieutenant General Gerardus Johannes Berenschot (24 July 1887 – 13 October 1941) was Commander-in-Chief of the Koninklijk Nederlands Indisch Leger (Royal Netherlands East Indies Army; KNIL). An Indo – as Eurasians of Indonesian and Dutch descent – Berenschot was the son of a Dutch officer in the KNIL.

== Early life ==
G. J. Berenschot was the son of Gerrit Hendrik Berenschot and Florence Mildred Rappa. At the age of 15, he was sent to the Netherlands, where he attended cadet school at Alkmaar. He later entered the Royal Military College, from which he graduated first in his class. He was the only commander of Indonesian descent (Indo) in the Dutch East Indies.

== Military career ==
Upon graduation, he returned to his native East Indies where he distinguished himself as a young subaltern serving in the KNIL during the bloody campaigns in Aceh. In 1911 he was transferred to the Korps Marechaussee te voet.

In 1934 he became the KNIL's Chief of the General Staff and, in July 1939, was promoted to Commander-in-Chief.

Berenschot was regarded as a gifted officer with organisational skills and possibly the best Commander-in-Chief the KNIL ever had. Not only was he a skilled soldier, Berenschot also displayed an impressive understanding of politics and diplomacy. Following the fall of the Netherlands in 1940, Berenschot participated in conferences involving Allied leaders at Singapore, where he was well liked and well regarded by his British and US counterparts.

On 13 October 1941, the plane carrying Bereschot back from a conference with British Air Chief Marshal Robert Brooke-Popham crashed in the suburbs of Batavia. There were no survivors. By order of the colonial authorities, all flags on public buildings were hung at half-mast. Berenschot's remains were buried in the Dutch War Cemetery Pandu in Bandung.

Bereschot's post of Commander-in-Chief of the KNIL was given to Lieutenant General Hein ter Poorten, who had the difficult task of preparing the East Indies for the looming war with Japan.

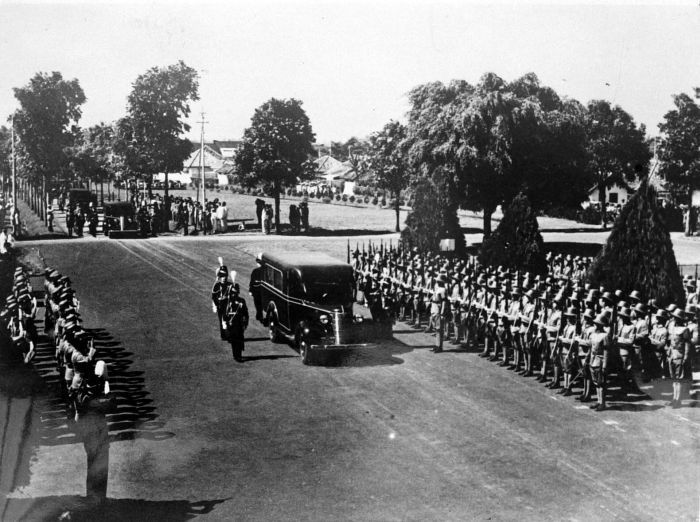
Funeral of Berenschot in Bandung, 1941.

== Personal life ==
Berenschot was married and with three children. His brother was Berend Willem Berenschot.

== Awards and decorations ==
- Knight of the Order of the Netherlands Lion
- Commander of the Order of Orange-Nassau
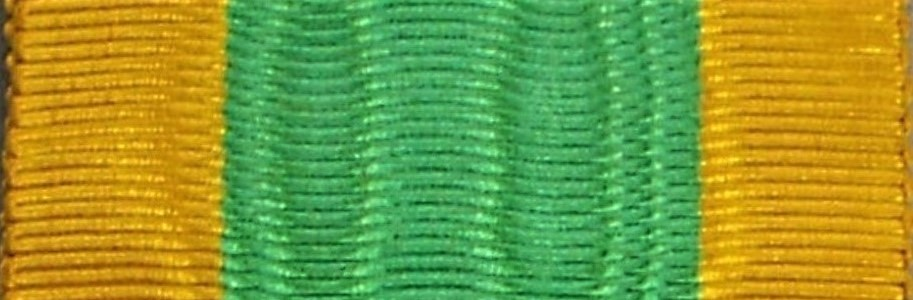
- Expedition Cross with clasps "Atjeh 1906–1910" and "Atjeh 1911–1914" and "Honourable Mention"
- Medal for Long, Honest and Faithful Service
