= Giovanni Narcis Hakkenberg =

Dutch Marine and war hero

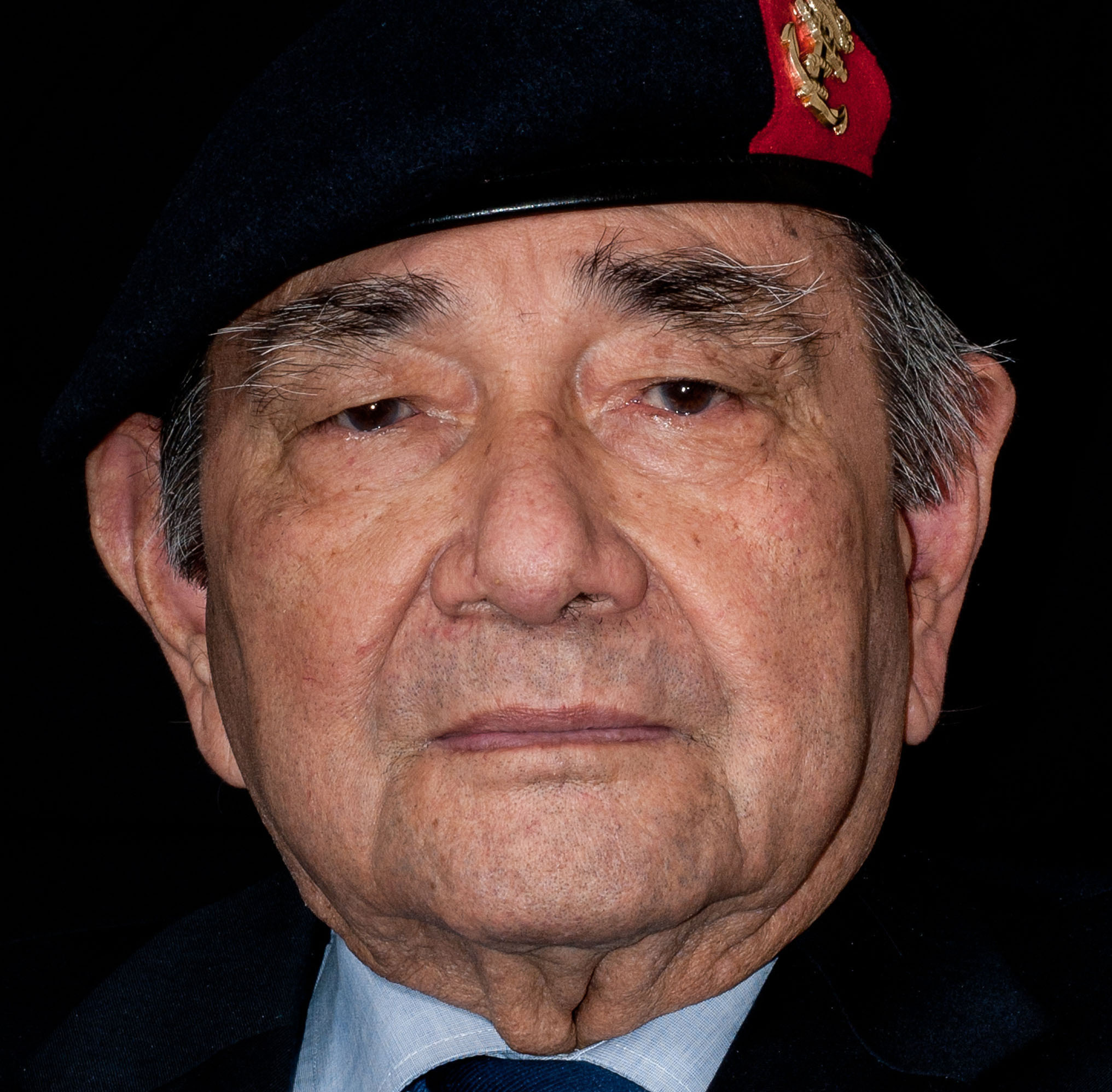
- Hakkenberg in 2011
- Born: 6 December 1923; Surabaya, Dutch East Indies
- Died: 15 February 2013 (aged 89); Ede, Netherlands
- Military career
- Allegiance: Netherlands
- Branch: Royal Netherlands Navy
- Service years: 1940–1974
- Rank: Captain (OF-2)
- Unit: Netherlands Marine Corps
- Commands: Numerous
- Conflicts: World War II; Battle of the Java Sea; Indonesian National Revolution; Operation Product; Operation Kraai
- Awards: Military William Order, Knight 4th class

Giovanni Narcissus Hakkenberg (6 December 1923 – 15 February 2013) was a Dutch marine of Indonesian and European descent, and decorated war hero and knight of the Military Order of William. The Military William Order is the highest honour in the Netherlands, bestowed for "performing excellent acts of Bravery, Leadership and Loyalty in battle".

== World War II ==
Hakkenberg was born in Surabaya, Dutch East Indies. In 1941, at the age of 17, he volunteered to join the Dutch Royal Navy to fight Nazi Germany in the European arena. After their training, volunteers were needed in the Dutch East Indies due to the increasing threat of the Japanese Empire. He was the youngest sailor on board the Admiralen-class destroyer HNLMS Kortenaer on 27 February 1942 when she engaged the Japanese navy in the Battle of the Java Sea. His vessel was torpedoed and sunk. Hakkenberg was rescued by the Royal Navy destroyer Encounter and brought to Surabaya.

On 8 March 1942 the Dutch East Indies capitulated to Japan and Hakkenberg became a prisoner of war. As a prisoner of war he was a captive in Thailand, a forced labourer on the Burma Railway and finally in 1944 a forced labourer in the Japanese coal mines.

After the Japanese capitulation, Hakkenberg and one brother were the only one of 10 brothers and cousins who survived the war. He remained in the navy and became a marine serving throughout the Indonesian national revolution. After the independence of Indonesia he continued his military career until retiring in 1974 as a sea lieutenant of the Marine Corps.

== Military Order of William ==
As a corporal and temporarily appointed sergeant of the Marines tasked with the security of East Java, Hakkenberg saw numerous combat actions in the Dutch East Indies during the Indonesian Revolution. He fought both irregular rebel units as well as the official Tentara Nasional Indonesia, the newly formed Indonesian army.

Hakkenberg was an energetic mission leader or solo combatant involved in many crucial tactical actions mostly carried out at night and alone or with a small detachment. For five prominent actions, carried out between 24 August 1948 and 6 March 1949, he was assigned the Military William Order fourth class.

The Royal Decree no.40 of 6 March 1951 stated:

...distinguished in battle by great acts of courage, and loyalty as commander of a detachment of the Marine brigade from September 1947 to May 1949 in the fight against terrorist gangs (and TNI units) in East Java, where he was head of only a very small group – sometimes not more than three to five men. His actions were successful [...] without suffering losses, due to namely: his excellent knowledge of the language, country, people, (traditions) [...] his fearlessness in particular.

1. On August 24, 1948 in Daragowak the influential gang leader Tai Pa with five of his henchmen were arrested alive;
2. On 25 October 1948 in Jakarta he infiltrated a TNI group to surprise and imprison them;
3. On 7 and 19 April 1949 on the south of Mentoeroe he inflicted losses on a powerful adversary;
4. On February 14, 1949 he overpowered and arrested the Chief of Staff of the TNI confiscating very valuable information;
5. On March 6, 1949 he arrested the Republican resident of Madiun with some other prisoners, despite fierce opposition.

On 29 May 2009 he was one of six surviving knights who were present at the Binnenhof in The Hague when Marco Kroon was knighted. On 12 August 2010, he was at the Commemoration Memorial of the Line Crossers in Brugje of St. Jan in the Biesbosch.

Hakkenberg lived in a care home in Wageningen and died during the afternoon of Friday 15 February 2013 in De Gelderse Vallei hospital in Ede, Netherlands.

== Honours and decorations ==
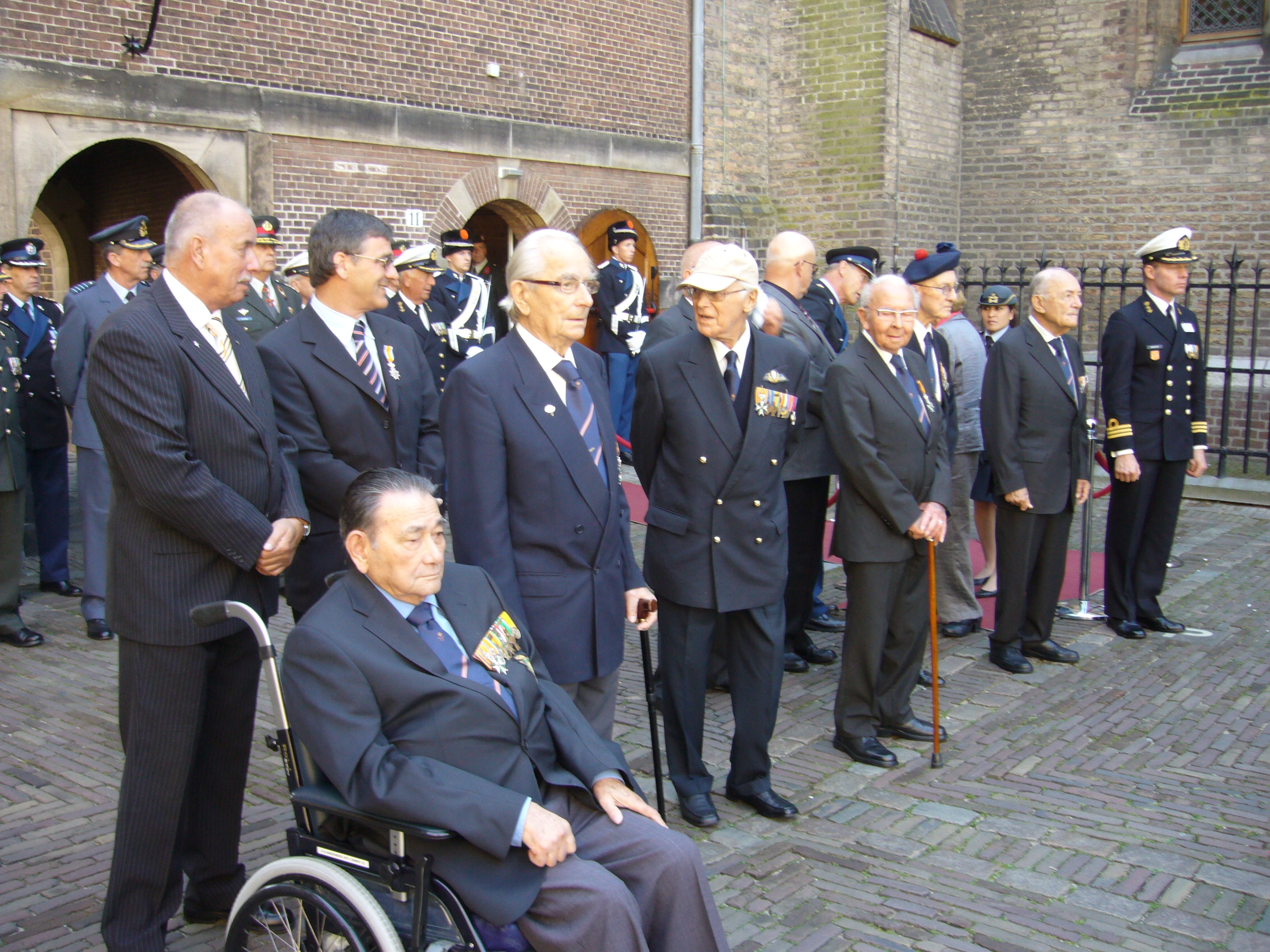
Hakkenberg in the front sitting in wheelchair at the Binnenhof ceremony for Kroon, 2009.

- Knight 4th Class of the Military Order of William
- Honorary Medal in Gold of the Order of Orange-Nassau
- Bronze Lion
- War Commemorative Cross, with 2 clasps
- Decoration for Order and Peace, with 4 clasps
- New Guinea Commemorative Cross
- NCO Long Service Medal, in silver (24 years service)
- Medal of the Sword (Sweden)

== See also ==
- Military William Order
- Order of Orange Nassau
