= Lodewijk Grondijs =

Dutch archaeologist (1878–1961)

Lodewijk Herman Grondijs (25 September 1878 in Pamekasan – 17 March 1961 in The Hague) or Louis Grondijs was a Dutch Byzantologist, art historian, physics teacher, war correspondent and soldier.

== Early life ==
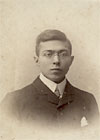
Louis Grondijs, student at Utrecht University in 1901

Grondijs was born in the Dutch East-Indies, now known as Indonesia, and via his mother was one-eighth Indonesian. He spent most of his youth in the East Indies and graduated in 1896 from grammar school in Surabaya.

From 1902 to 1903 he lived in a Christian anarchist commune called “I Broederschap” (International Brotherhood).

A gifted academic, he graduated in mathematics and physics at Utrecht University in 1905 and continued his studies in philosophy and mathematics at Leiden University. He was an editor of the Tijdschrift voor Wijsbegeerte (Journal of Philosophy) from 1907 to 1932. Upon finishing his education Grondijs went to work as a physics teacher at the Willem II College.

== Great War ==
Working as a teacher at the Dordrecht Technical Institute in 1914, he quit his post when the Great War broke out and secured a position as war-correspondent for the Dutch newspaper Nieuwe Rotterdamsche Courant, traveling to Belgium. He covered the early events of the war in Aerschot, the German war crimes at Leuven as well as the siege of Antwerp. He wrote a book on his experience there: The Germans in Belgium - Notes by a Dutch Eye-Witness. He went on to visit the French, Russian and then the Romanian front, working as a war-correspondent for various international newspapers and news-magazines. Throughout he joined in the fighting with the soldiers. For saving fifty Belgian clergymen from German execution during the Rape of Belgium period, including the rector magnificus of the famous Catholic University of Leuven, he was decorated officer in the Belgian Order of the Crown.

Later in September 1915, he left for Russia at the invitation of general Aleksei Brusilov where he was allowed to accompany the Russian 8th Army as a correspondent of The Daily Telegraph. Many of his written articles on warfare on the Eastern Front were published in the prestigious French newsweekly l'Illustration. He apparently respected the fighting qualities of the common Russian soldier and expressed his admiration numerous times in his articles. And although an academic by profession, he seemed to relish the adventure and excitement of war-time journalism and of warfare itself; he is said to have taken active part in combat along with his Russian hosts on many occasions. For this, he was decorated with the Imperial Russian Order of St. George, Order of St. Stanislaus, Order of St. Anna and Order of St. Vladimir.

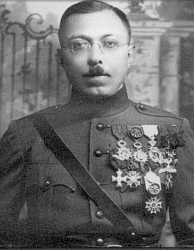
Louis Grondijs, Captain in the French Army in 1919

Grondijs was in Petrograd when the February Revolution took place there.

After the October Revolution he joined the White forces in southern Russia, where he joined counter-revolutionary armies of generals Lavr Kornilov and Mikhail Alekseev and reported on the Russian Civil War.

In June 1918 he was the only western war correspondent to join the Volunteer Army in the Kuban Campaign. Oddly he appears to have found the time to obtain a doctor's degree in physics at the University of Kharkov in 1917 on the thesis Elektromagnetische Feldgleichungen bewegter Systeme. He also became an honorary captain of the French army as an official war correspondent in Siberia, where he met his future wife during this period. After the Bolshevik victory he settled in Paris, becoming associated with the Laboratoire des recherches physiques and studying Byzantology and art history.

In 1918 he became an accredited war-correspondent to the French government, for which later that year he travelled to the US, Japan and the Russian Far East. In the US he met former president Teddy Roosevelt and Tomáš Masaryk who became in 1920 president of Czechoslovakia. From Japan he returned to Russia, holding the honorary rank of captain in the French Army and following and reporting on events with the French Military Mission in Siberia during the years 1918–1920. For this, he was decorated with the French Légion d'Honneur á titre militaire and the Order of the Rising Sun of Japan. He married Antonie Therese Marie Thekla van Embden in 1908, and divorced her in the late 1910s. During the Russian Civil War, he married Valentine de Gontjarenko Petrenko, a concert pianist. After the definitive Bolshevik victory he returned to Europe, openly professing his anti-Bolshevik views in articles and lectures.

== Inter-war period ==
In the early 1920s he settled in Paris working for the Laboratoire des Recherches Physiques of the Sorbonne and studying history of arts and Byzantology.

In 1928 he returned to the Netherlands and due to his by Dutch standards extraordinary knowledge of art history he was made teacher of the history of Byzantine and Russian culture at Royal University of Utrecht by 1931. He also became secretary of the anti-Soviet anti-communist Comité voor Nationale Samenwerking (committee for national cooperation). In 1935 became a full professor of Byzantine history and art at Utrecht University. In 1939 he became associate professor of iconography and church art.

From 1929 to 1936 he was an employee of De Rijkseenheid, a pro-colonial periodical. In 1932 and 1933 he fought on the Japanese side in Manchuria. He also joined the nationalists in the Spanish Civil War and agitated for them upon returning home. In the 1930s he was also involved in archaeological excavations. Love of adventure and war must have been irresistible, for he later went to Manchuria to report on the Japanese invasion of Manchuria. He met with Chiang Kai-shek, Puyi and Thubten Chökyi Nyima the Panchen Lama. In 1936-37 he was in Spain during the Spanish Civil War, afterwards in 1939 accompanying the Hungarian army as it occupied Ruthenia, as a result of the Munich Agreement.

== World War II ==
After the Nazis invaded the Soviet Union in Operation Barbarossa, they requested Grondijs to write anti-Bolshevik articles but he instead published one about the valiancy of the Russian war effort in World War One. His openly expressed appreciation of the bravery of Russian fighting-men, based upon his first-hand experiences during the Great War, did little to endear him to the occupying German and collaborating Netherlands authorities and he was dropped from favor, apparently narrowly missing incarceration because of these views.

In 1941 he obtained his second doctor's degree at the Sorbonne with the thesis L'iconographie byzantine du Crucifié mort sur la croix. He was made professor shortly before the end of the war.

== Subsequent life ==
While associating with SS and NSB personnel during the war he denied claims of collaboration. After an inquiry due to the suspicious promotion late in the war he left the academic life behind though he kept publishing.

He died in 1961 at age 82 while fencing.
