= Paatje Phefferkorn =

Indonesian martial art (1922–2021)

Verdi Phefferkorn von Offenbach
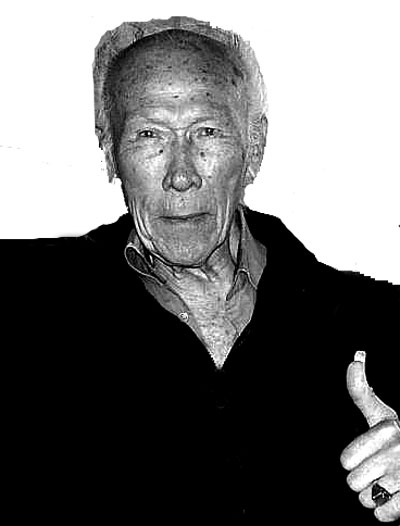
- Paatje Phefferkorn, Pencak Silat champion.
- Born: 26 February 1922; Bandung, Dutch East Indies
- Died: 1 January 2021 (aged 98); Apeldoorn, Netherlands
- Occupation: Martial Artist

Verdi Phefferkorn von Offenbach (26 February 1922 – 1 January 2021), better known as Paatje Phefferkorn, was an Indo practitioner of the Indonesian martial art Pencak Silat in the Netherlands. As one of its best known teachers he has played an important role in increasing the popularity of this Martial Art in the Netherlands and Europe.

Phefferkorn was also the creator of the informal Indo flag and emblem.

== Dutch East Indies 1931–1941 ==
In 1931, at the age of 10, Phefferkorn started practicing Pencak Silat in Bandung, the Dutch East Indies. He became a prodigy and only Indo student at the Javanese Pencak Silat school of teacher Mr. Sumanto who practiced the style of ‘Setia Hati’. For 7 years he trained with Sumanto on a daily basis.

== WWII 1942–1945 ==
When WWII broke out Phefferkorn enlisted as volunteer and became an air force armaments mechanic and air gunner. The aging Glenn Martin bombers at the secret airport of Samazinda where he was stationed were no match for the modern Japanese war machine and on 8 March 1942 he was made a POW. He managed to escape the Japanese prisoner camp and fled to the Preanger mountains where he joined other resistance fighters to engage the Japanese in a guerilla war. Despite the fact he was half Indonesian his blue eyes revealed he was not Javanese and he was caught during a razzia by the Kempeitai. None of the other resistance fighters survived Japanese imprisonment. Phefferkorn barely survived himself and after Japan's defeat in the war he only weighed 21 kilos.

== Revolution 1946–1958 ==
Due to the revolutionary violence during the Bersiap period following Japan's capitulation, he was initially unable to leave the prison camp, but was too frustrated with the fact that he had to be protected by Japanese guards that he stole weapons and escaped their protective custody. He survived the Bersiap period and vainly attempted to build a home for his family during the chaotic years of the Indonesian Revolution. In one of the last so called repatriation waves he left Indonesia for the Netherlands.

== The Netherlands 1959–2013 ==
Penniless Phefferkorn arrived in the Netherlands with a family of 7 children and only continued the art of Pencak Silat for his personal training exercises. In 1967 he started a small school in the city of Utrecht. Soon he established a second school and in the end ran 17 schools throughout the Netherlands. He became part of the "Council Of Elders" advising the Dutch Pencak Silat union, BPSI (Bond Pencak Silat Indonesia). In 2013 he was officially inducted in the CBME's National Dutch Hall of Fame for Martial Artists.

Phefferkorn died from complications of COVID-19 on 1 January 2021, during the COVID-19 pandemic in the Netherlands. He was 98.

== Indo Melati Flag ==
Phefferkorn is also known as the creator of the 'Indo Melati' flag and emblem. The flag represents communal pride and loyalty and overall peace and non-violence supported by signs of defensibility.

- The two tilted 'siku-siku' (tridents) and the 'golok' (sword) represent Indo people as advocates and fighters in words and deeds.
- The middle of the triangle is reserved for the 'kembang melati' (jasmine flower); the flower represents charm and beauty. This flower particularly symbolizes Indo women.
- The star on top symbolizes the brightness during a dark night and people that shine when times call for it.
- The symbol is enclosed by a 'padi' halm (young rice stalk) on the left and right side. This symbolizes prosperity and good fortune.
- At the bottom the word INDO is written in gold coloured capital letters.
