= Boris Sádecký =

Slovak ice hockey player (1997–2021)

- Born: 20 April 1997 Trenčín, Slovakia
- Died: 3 November 2021 (aged 24) Dornbirn, Austria
- Height: 6 ft 0 in (183 cm)
- Weight: 185 lb (84 kg; 13 st 3 lb)
- Position: Centre
- Shot: Left
- Played for: HK Dukla Trenčín; HK Orange 20; HC Slovan Bratislava; Bratislava Capitals
- NHL draft: Undrafted
- Playing career: 2016–2021

Boris Sádecký (20 April 1997 – 3 November 2021) was a Slovak professional ice hockey player who played professionally for Bratislava Capitals of the bet-at-home ICE Hockey League.

On 30 October 2021 Sádecký inexplicably collapsed on the ice in the final seconds of the first period of a game against the Dornbirn Bulldogs, and died in hospital on 3 November. According to his relatives, he suffered a mild heartburn on the day of the collapse. And during hospital examinations it was found that he had an inflammation of the heart which potentially lead to cardiac arrest during the game.

== Career statistics ==
=== Regular season and playoffs ===
| | | | Regular season | | | | | Playoffs |
| Season | Team | League | GP | G | A | Pts | PIM | GP | G | A | Pts | PIM |
|---|---|---|---|---|---|---|---|---|---|---|---|---|
| 2013–14 | HK Dukla Trenčín | Slovak-Jr. | 30 | 14 | 6 | 20 | 22 | — | — | — | — | — |
| 2014–15 | Team Slovakia U18 | Slovak.1 | 33 | 2 | 7 | 9 | 16 | — | — | — | — | — |
| 2014–15 | HK Dukla Trenčín | Slovak-Jr. | 4 | 1 | 7 | 8 | 0 | 9 | 0 | 2 | 2 | 6 |
| 2015–16 | HK Orange 20 | Slovak | 20 | 0 | 4 | 4 | 16 | — | — | — | — | — |
| 2015–16 | HK Orange 20 | Slovak.1 | 11 | 4 | 2 | 6 | 6 | — | — | — | — | — |
| 2016–17 | HK Orange 20 | Slovak | 13 | 2 | 2 | 4 | 2 | — | — | — | — | — |
| 2016–17 | HK Orange 20 | Slovak.1 | 2 | 0 | 1 | 1 | 0 | — | — | — | — | — |
| 2016–17 | HC Slovan Bratislava | KHL | 4 | 0 | 1 | 1 | 0 | — | — | — | — | — |
| 2016–17 | HK Dukla Trenčín | Slovak-Jr. | 1 | 0 | 0 | 0 | 0 | 1 | 0 | 1 | 1 | 2 |
| 2016–17 | HK Dukla Trenčín | Slovak | 15 | 2 | 2 | 4 | 2 | — | — | — | — | — |
| 2017–18 | HC Slovan Bratislava | KHL | 48 | 2 | 2 | 4 | 8 | — | — | — | — | — |
| 2017–18 | HK Dukla Trenčín | Slovak | 14 | 1 | 2 | 3 | 4 | 17 | 2 | 5 | 7 | 10 |
| 2018–19 | HK Dukla Trenčín | Slovak | 52 | 7 | 16 | 23 | 30 | 3 | 0 | 0 | 0 | 25 |
| 2019–20 | HK Dukla Trenčín | Slovak | 47 | 11 | 14 | 25 | 24 | — | — | — | — | — |
| 2020–21 | HK Dukla Trenčín | Slovak | 36 | 6 | 10 | 16 | 18 | 10 | 1 | 3 | 4 | 10 |
| 2021–22 | Bratislava Capitals | ICEHL | 11 | 4 | 3 | 7 | 8 | — | — | — | — | — |
| KHL totals | | | 52 | 2 | 3 | 5 | 8 | — | — | — | — | — |
| Slovak totals | | | 197 | 29 | 50 | 79 | 96 | 30 | 3 | 8 | 11 | 45 |

=== International ===
| Year | Team | Event | Result | GP | G | A | Pts | PIM |
|---|---|---|---|---|---|---|---|---|
| 2015 | Slovakia | WJC18 | 7th | 5 | 0 | 1 | 1 | 0 |
| 2016 | Slovakia | WJC | 7th | 3 | 0 | 0 | 0 | 0 |
| 2017 | Slovakia | WJC | 8th | 5 | 0 | 3 | 3 | 0 |
| Junior totals | | | | 13 | 0 | 4 | 4 | 0 |
