= 2023–24 Clarkson Golden Knights men's ice hockey season =

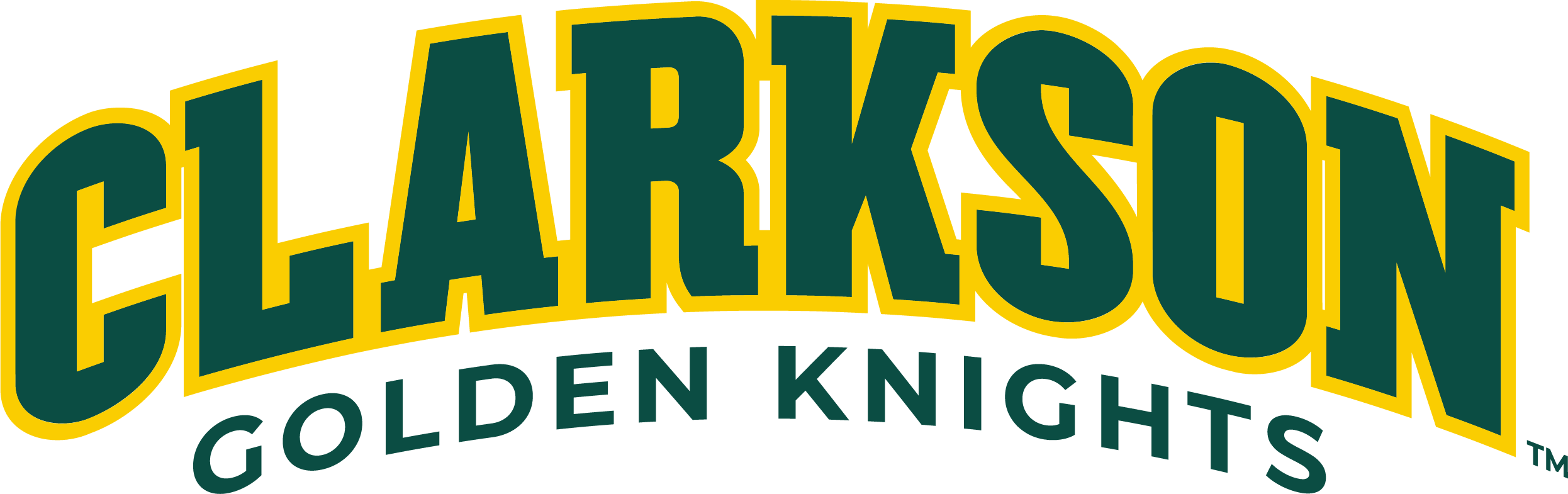
- Conference: 5th ECAC Hockey
- Home ice: Cheel Arena

Rankings
- USCHO: NR
- USA Hockey: NR

Record
- Overall: 18–16–1
- Conference: 12–9–1
- Home: 9–7–1
- Road: 8–8–0
- Neutral: 1–1–0

Coaches and captains
- Head coach: Casey Jones
- Assistant coaches: Cory Schneider; Chris Brooks; Cam Basarab
- Captain(s): Mathieu Gosselin; Dustyn McFaul
- Alternate captain(s): Anthony Romano; Kaelan Taylor

The 2023–24 Clarkson Golden Knights Men's ice hockey season was the 102nd season of play for the program and 63rd in ECAC Hockey. The Golden Knights represented Clarkson University in the 2023–24 NCAA Division I men's ice hockey season, played their home games at Cheel Arena and were coached by Casey Jones in his 13th season.

== Season ==
Clarkson did not begin the year in good standing. After a decent result in the first week, the Golden Knights played inconsistently for the rest of October and ended up with a sub-.500 mark. The goaltending battle for the starting role was largely between two new players, freshman Emmett Croteau and senior Austin Roden. The later had gotten the job out of training camp but a lack of success early in the year gave the rookie a shot in goal. After a loss to Rensselaer to open the conference schedule, Roden was back in goal and he settled into the Knights' crease. Clarkson didn't lose another game the rest of the year and went into the winter break near the top of the ECAC standings.

When the team reconvened after Christmas, the Golden Knights were playing at the inaugural Adirondack Winter Invitational. They split their two games, both against ranked opponents, and finished third in the field. By that time, it was apparent that the team had no real chance of earning an at-large bud to the NCAA tournament as they sat 30th in the PairWise standings. While they still had a few games against ranked clubs left on their slate, the Knights could not afford to lose any of the remaining matches and in all likelihood have to win their tournament to return to the national tournament. Unfortunately, the scoring became inconsistent in January and split every weekend for the entire month. Roden, too, was unable to sustain a suitable level of play and he was spelled by Brady Parker in early 2024. Parker played marginally better at first but in early February, the bottom dropped out. Over a six-game stretch, the Golden Knights lost 5 games while averaging less than 2 goals per game. The bad stretch dropped the team down to .500 and put them in jeopardy of having to start their postseason in the first round.

Over the final three weeks, Roden turned in several key performances, including a pair of overtime wins against Cornell and Quinnipiac. However, the team still missed out on a bye into the quarterfinal round by 1 point. Clarkson started their playoff run against Rensselaer, the worst team in the standings. Despite being heavily favored in the game, the Knights didn't have energy in the first two periods and found themselves down entering the third. The team picked up the pace in the final 20 minutes but weren't able to get a marker on the board until the final 7 minutes of the match. After pulling Roden early, Mathieu Gosselin scored his team-leading 11th goal of the season and the Knights found themselves down by just 1 with more than two minutes to play. The shots came fast and furious in the final moments but Clarkson was unable to get the tying goal and saw their season end in a rather dismal fashion.

== Departures ==
Player	Position	Nationality	Cause
Anthony Callin	Forward	United States	Graduation (signed with Worcester Railers)
Alex Campbell	Forward	Canada	Transferred to Northeastern
Charlie Campbell	Forward	Canada	Left program (retired)
Ethan Haider	Goaltender	United States	Transferred to Connecticut
Chris Klack	Forward	Canada	Graduation (signed with Corsaires de Dunkerque)
Luke Mobley	Forward	United States	Transferred to Augustana
Tommy Pasanen	Defenseman	Germany	Transferred to Bowling Green
Jordan Power	Defenseman	Canada	Transferred to Minnesota State
Charlie Russell	Forward	United States	Left mid-season (returned to juniors)
Jacob Schmidt-Svejstrup	Forward	Denmark	Graduation (signed with SønderjyskE)
Gabe Vinal	Goaltender	United States	Graduation (retired)

== Recruiting ==
Player	Position	Nationality	Age	Notes
Eric Ciccolini	Forward	Canada	22	Vaughan, ON; graduate transfer from Michigan; selected 205th overall in 2019
Emmett Croteau	Goaltender	Canada	19	Bonnyville, AB; selected 162nd overall in 2022
Daimon Gardner	Forward	Canada	19	Eagle Lake, ON; selected 112th overall in 2022
Jack Judson	Defenseman	Canada	23	White Rock, BC; graduate transfer from Arizona State
Oliver Moberg	Forward	Sweden	20	Bromma, SWE
Cody Monds	Forward	Canada	22	Brockville, ON; transfer from Providence
Austin Roden	Goaltender	Canada	25	Surrey, BC; graduate transfer from Providence
Carter Rose	Defenseman	United States	21	Brasher Falls, NY
Charlie Russell	Forward	United States	20	Houghton, MI
Talon Sigurdson	Forward	United States	21	Sartell, MN
Jesse Tucker	Forward	Canada	23	Longlac, ON; transfer from Michigan State

== Roster ==
As of September 19, 2023.

No.	Nat.	Player	Class	Pos	Height	Weight	DoB	Hometown	Previous team	NHL rights
1	(Canada)	Emmett Croteau	Freshman	G	6' 4" (1.93 m)	209 lb (95 kg)	2003-12-07	Bonnyville, Alberta	Waterloo Black Hawks (USHL)	MTL, 162nd overall 2022
2	(Canada)	Jack Judson	Senior	D	6' 1" (1.85 m)	195 lb (88 kg)	2000-02-26	White Rock, British Columbia	Arizona State (NCAA)	—
3	(United States)	Kaelan Taylor (A)	Senior	D	6' 2" (1.88 m)	185 lb (84 kg)	1999-01-03	Oceanside, California	Dubuque Fighting Saints (USHL)	—
4	(Canada)	Trey Taylor	Sophomore	D	6' 2" (1.88 m)	190 lb (86 kg)	2002-02-04	Richmond, British Columbia	Youngstown Phantoms (USHL)	—
5	(United States)	Tristan Sarsland	Sophomore	D	6' 0" (1.83 m)	185 lb (84 kg)	2004-02-25	Wayzata, Minnesota	Benilde-St. Margaret's (USHS–MN)	—
8	(United States)	Carter Rose	Freshman	D	6' 2" (1.88 m)	195 lb (88 kg)	2002-08-09	Brasher Falls, New York	Green Bay Gamblers (USHL)	—
9	(United States)	Erik Bargholtz	Sophomore	F	6' 2" (1.88 m)	195 lb (88 kg)	2001-04-12	Appleton, Wisconsin	Fargo Force (USHL)	—
10	(Canada)	Brady Egan	Sophomore	F	5' 10" (1.78 m)	175 lb (79 kg)	2001-10-09	Carp, Ontario	Bismarck Bobcats (NAHL)	—
11	(United States)	Charlie Russell	Freshman	F	5' 11" (1.8 m)	174 lb (79 kg)	2003-08-21	Houghton, Michigan	Fargo Force (USHL)	—
12	(United States)	Caden Lewandowski	Junior	D	6' 4" (1.93 m)	205 lb (93 kg)	2000-06-02	Mars, Pennsylvania	Johnstown Tomahawks (NAHL)	—
13	(Canada)	Mathieu Gosselin (C)	Graduate	F	5' 10" (1.78 m)	168 lb (76 kg)	1999-05-18	Quebec City, Quebec	Merritt Centennials (BCHL)	—
14	(United States)	Talon Sigurdson	Freshman	F	6' 1" (1.85 m)	175 lb (79 kg)	2002-01-11	Sartell, Minnesota	Des Moines Buccaneers (USHL)	—
15	(Canada)	Ayrton Martino	Junior	F	5' 11" (1.8 m)	167 lb (76 kg)	2002-09-28	Toronto, Ontario	Omaha Lancers (USHL)	DAL, 73rd overall 2021
16	(Canada)	Daimon Gardner	Freshman	F	6' 5" (1.96 m)	205 lb (93 kg)	2004-01-18	Eagle Lake, Ontario	Tri-City Storm (USHL)	VAN, 112th overall 2022
17	(Canada)	Jesse Tucker	Junior	F	5' 11" (1.8 m)	187 lb (85 kg)	2000-03-01	Longlac, Ontario	Michigan State (Big Ten)	—
18	(Canada)	Noah Beck	Senior	D	6' 3" (1.91 m)	191 lb (87 kg)	2001-03-25	Richmond Hill, Ontario	Fargo Force (USHL)	STL, 194th overall 2020
19	(Canada)	Ellis Rickwood	Sophomore	F	6' 2" (1.88 m)	200 lb (91 kg)	2002-07-02	Brantford, Ontario	Victoria Grizzlies (BCHL)	—
20	(Canada)	Cody Monds	Junior	F	5' 9" (1.75 m)	170 lb (77 kg)	2001-02-09	Brockville, Ontario	Providence (HEA)	—
21	(United States)	George Grannis	Junior	F	6' 0" (1.83 m)	195 lb (88 kg)	2000-04-16	Duluth, Minnesota	Bismarck Bobcats (NAHL)	—
23	(Sweden)	Oliver Moberg	Freshman	F	6' 3" (1.91 m)	210 lb (95 kg)	2003-02-23	Bromma, Sweden	Dubuque Fighting Saints (USHL)	—
26	(Canada)	Ryan Richardson	Junior	F	6' 1" (1.85 m)	185 lb (84 kg)	2001-04-09	Stittsville, Ontario	Fargo Force (USHL)	—
27	(Canada)	Dustyn McFaul (C)	Graduate	D	6' 2" (1.88 m)	191 lb (87 kg)	2000-08-04	Waterdown, Ontario	Pickering Panthers (OJHL)	BOS, 181st overall 2018
28	(United States)	Ryan Taylor	Sophomore	F	6' 3" (1.91 m)	210 lb (95 kg)	2001-03-19	St. Peters, Missouri	Bismarck Bobcats (NAHL)	—
29	(Canada)	Anthony Romano (A)	Graduate	F	5' 11" (1.8 m)	185 lb (84 kg)	2000-10-07	Maple, Ontario	Sioux Falls Stampede (USHL)	ARI, 176th overall 2019
33	(Canada)	Austin Roden	Senior	G	6' 1" (1.85 m)	185 lb (84 kg)	1998-04-30	Victoria, British Columbia	Providence (HEA)	—
34	(Canada)	Brady Parker	Junior	G	5' 10" (1.78 m)	180 lb (82 kg)	2000-07-10	Calgary, Alberta	Okotoks Oilers (AJHL)	—
39	(Canada)	Eric Ciccolini	Graduate	F	6' 0" (1.83 m)	170 lb (77 kg)	2001-01-04	Vaughan, Ontario	Michigan (Big Ten)	NYR, 205th overall 2019

== Standings ==
2023–24 ECAC Hockey Standings
	Conference record										Overall record					
	GP	W	L	T	OTW	OTL	SW	PTS	GF	GA	GP	W	L	T	GF	GA
#6 Quinnipiac †	22	17	4	1	0	2	0	54	99	39	39	27	10	2	160	79
#9 Cornell *	22	12	6	4	1	2	3	44	74	45	35	22	7	6	115	65
Colgate	22	13	7	2	2	2	2	43	85	68	36	16	16	4	120	112
Dartmouth	22	9	6	7	1	1	3	37	66	60	32	13	10	9	92	91
Clarkson	22	12	9	1	4	2	1	36	62	58	35	18	16	1	95	97
Union	22	9	10	3	1	1	2	32	75	75	37	16	18	3	123	121
St. Lawrence	22	8	10	4	1	1	1	29	49	64	39	14	19	6	90	118
Harvard	22	6	10	6	1	2	3	28	49	64	32	7	19	6	70	106
Princeton	22	8	11	3	4	0	2	25	70	90	30	10	16	4	89	114
Yale	22	7	13	2	1	2	1	25	46	57	30	10	18	2	63	91
Brown	22	6	14	2	2	3	1	22	43	69	30	8	19	3	61	98
Rensselaer	22	6	13	3	0	0	0	21	58	89	37	10	23	4	93	150
Championship: March 23, 2024 † indicates conference regular season champion (Cleary Cup) * indicates conference tournament champion (Whitelaw Cup); Rankings: USCHO.com Top 20 Poll

== Schedule and results ==
Date	Time	Opponent^{#}	Rank^{#}	Site	TV	Decision	Result	Attendance	Record
Regular Season
October 7	7:00 pm	at #20 Notre Dame*		Compton Family Ice Arena • Notre Dame, Indiana	Peacock	Roden	W 3–1	4,395	1–0–0
October 8	7:00 pm	at #20 Notre Dame*		Compton Family Ice Arena • Notre Dame, Indiana	Peacock	Roden	L 0–3	3,726	1–1–0
October 13	7:00 pm	#18 Penn State*		Cheel Arena • Potsdam, New York	ESPN+	Roden	L 2–4	3,177	1–2–0
October 14	7:00 pm	Vermont*		Cheel Arena • Potsdam, New York	ESPN+	Roden	W 3–2	2,459	2–2–0
October 20	7:00 pm	at Merrimack*		J. Thom Lawler Rink • North Andover, Massachusetts	ESPN+	Croteau	L 1–4	2,947	2–3–0
October 27	7:00 pm	Lake Superior State*		Cheel Arena • Potsdam, New York	ESPN+	Roden	L 3–4 ^{OT}	2,519	2–4–0
October 28	7:30 pm	Michigan Tech*		Cheel Arena • Potsdam, New York	ESPN+	Croteau	W 3–1	2,962	3–4–0
November 10	7:00 pm	Rensselaer		Cheel Arena • Potsdam, New York (Rivalry)	ESPN+	Croteau	L 2–4	2,881	3–5–0 (0–1–0)
November 11	7:00 pm	Union		Cheel Arena • Potsdam, New York	ESPN+	Roden	W 4–1	2,621	4–5–0 (1–1–0)
November 17	7:00 pm	at Brown		Meehan Auditorium • Providence, Rhode Island	ESPN+	Roden	W 3–2 ^{OT}	542	5–5–0 (2–1–0)
November 18	7:00 pm	at Yale		Ingalls Rink • New Haven, Connecticut	ESPN+	Roden	W 2–1	1,217	6–5–0 (3–1–0)
December 1	7:00 pm	Harvard		Cheel Arena • Potsdam, New York	ESPN+	Roden	W 3–0	2,360	7–5–0 (4–1–0)
December 2	4:00 pm	Dartmouth		Cheel Arena • Potsdam, New York	ESPN+	Roden	T 2–2 ^{SOW}	2,321	7–5–1 (4–1–1)
December 8	7:00 pm	Stonehill*		Cheel Arena • Potsdam, New York	ESPN+	Roden	W 5–1	2,133	8–5–1
December 9	7:00 pm	USNTDP		Cheel Arena • Potsdam, New York (Exhibition)	ESPN+		W 3–2 ^{OT}		
Adirondack Winter Invitational
December 29	7:30 pm	vs. #13 Arizona State*		Herb Brooks Arena • Lake Placid, New York (Winter Invitational Semifinal)	ESPN+	Roden	L 2–5	4,170	8–6–1
December 30	4:00 pm	vs. #11 Massachusetts*		Herb Brooks Arena • Lake Placid, New York (Winter Invitational Consolation Game)	ESPN+	Roden	W 5–4 ^{OT}	3,621	9–6–1
January 5	7:00 pm	at #18 RIT*		Gene Polisseni Center • Henrietta, New York	FloHockey	Roden	L 0–4	3,091	9–7–1
January 6	7:00 pm	at Canisius*		LECOM Harborcenter • Buffalo, New York	FloHockey	Parker	W 4–3	1,332	10–7–1
January 12	7:00 pm	at Union		Achilles Rink • Schenectady, New York	ESPN+	Roden	L 1–5	2,056	10–8–1 (4–2–1)
January 13	4:00 pm	at Rensselaer		Houston Field House • Troy, New York (Rivalry)	ESPN+	Parker	W 4–1	3,026	11–8–1 (5–2–1)
January 19	7:00 pm	Yale		Cheel Arena • Potsdam, New York	ESPN+	Parker	W 5–3	2,369	12–8–1 (6–2–1)
January 20	7:00 pm	Brown		Cheel Arena • Potsdam, New York	ESPN+	Roden	L 2–3 ^{OT}	2,521	12–9–1 (6–3–1)
January 26	7:00 pm	St. Lawrence		Cheel Arena • Potsdam, New York (Rivalry)	ESPN+	Parker	W 4–1	3,602	13–9–1 (7–3–1)
January 27	7:00 pm	at St. Lawrence		Appleton Arena • Canton, New York (Rivalry)	ESPN+	Parker	L 1–2	2,826	13–10–1 (7–4–1)
February 2	7:00 pm	at Colgate		Class of 1965 Arena • Hamilton, New York	ESPN+	Parker	L 2–4	1,531	13–11–1 (7–5–1)
February 3	7:00 pm	at #13 Cornell		Lynah Rink • Ithaca, New York	ESPN+	Croteau	L 2–7	4,092	13–12–1 (7–6–1)
February 9	7:00 pm	Princeton		Cheel Arena • Potsdam, New York	ESPN+	Roden	W 4–2	2,477	14–12–1 (8–6–1)
February 10	7:00 pm	#5 Quinnipiac		Cheel Arena • Potsdam, New York	ESPN+	Roden	L 2–4	2,788	14–13–1 (8–7–1)
February 16	7:00 pm	at Dartmouth		Thompson Arena • Hanover, New Hampshire	ESPN+	Roden	L 0–3	1,694	14–14–1 (8–8–1)
February 17	7:00 pm	at Harvard		Bright-Landry Hockey Center • Boston, Massachusetts	ESPN+	Croteau	W 3–2	1,682	15–14–1 (9–8–1)
February 23	7:00 pm	#11 Cornell		Cheel Arena • Potsdam, New York	ESPN+	Roden	W 4–3 ^{OT}	2,652	16–14–1 (10–8–1)
February 24	7:00 pm	Colgate		Cheel Arena • Potsdam, New York	ESPN+	Roden	L 3–4 ^{OT}	2,498	16–15–1 (10–9–1)
March 1	7:00 pm	at #7 Quinnipiac		M&T Bank Arena • Hamden, Connecticut	ESPN+	Roden	W 3–2 ^{OT}	3,237	17–15–1 (11–9–1)
March 2	7:00 pm	at Princeton		Hobey Baker Memorial Rink • Princeton, New Jersey	ESPN+	Roden	W 6–2	1,059	18–15–1 (12–9–1)
ECAC Hockey Tournament
March 9	7:00 pm	Rensselaer*		Cheel Arena • Potsdam, New York (First Round, Rivalry)	ESPN+	Roden	L 2–3	2,834	18–16–1
*Non-conference game. ^{#}Rankings from USCHO.com Poll. All times are in Eastern Time. Source:

== Scoring statistics ==
Name	Position	Games	Goals	Assists	Points	PIM
Mathieu Gosselin	RW	31	11	17	28	35
Ayrton Martino	LW	31	9	18	27	8
Anthony Romano	C/RW	27	10	15	25	4
Ryan Richardson	LW	35	7	16	23	12
Trey Taylor	D	35	4	13	17	27
Ryan Taylor	F	24	10	6	16	4
Eric Ciccolini	RW	34	8	8	16	28
Cody Monds	RW	30	7	8	15	21
Jesse Tucker	C	34	4	10	14	28
Tristan Sarsland	D	34	5	7	12	14
Ellis Rickwood	C	22	4	5	9	8
Erik Bargholtz	F	29	4	5	9	6
Noah Beck	D	30	3	6	9	16
Jack Judson	D	35	0	7	7	57
Daimon Gardner	C	29	1	5	6	8
Kaelan Taylor	D	34	1	5	6	28
Dustyn McFaul	D	35	3	0	3	24
George Grannis	F	30	2	1	3	12
Oliver Moberg	RW	24	0	3	3	2
Talon Sigurdson	F	25	1	1	2	10
Carter Rose	D	15	1	0	1	4
Caden Lewandowski	D	12	0	1	1	4
Brady Egan	C	18	0	1	1	2
Austin Roden	G	25	0	1	1	0
Emmett Croteau	G	6	0	0	0	0
Brady Parker	G	6	0	0	0	0
Charlie Russell	F	7	0	0	0	0
Total			95	159	254	364

== Goaltending statistics ==
Name	Games	Minutes	Wins	Losses	Ties	Goals against	Saves	Shut outs	SV %	GAA
Brady Parker	7	354:55	4	2	0	14	138	0	.908	2.37
Austin Roden	25	1434:37	12	11	1	59	540	1	.902	2.47
Emmett Croteau	6	306:20	2	3	0	18	91	0	.835	3.53
Empty Net	-	28:44	-	-	-	6	-	-	-	-
Total	35	2124:36	18	16	1	97	769	1	.888	2.74

== Rankings ==
Poll	Week																										
Poll	Pre	1	2	3	4	5	6	7	8	9	10	11	12	13	14	15	16	17	18	19	20	21	22	23	24	25	26 (Final)
USCHO.com	NR	NR	NR	NR	NR	NR	NR	NR	NR	NR	NR	–	NR	NR	NR	NR	NR	NR	NR	NR	NR	NR	NR	NR	NR	–	NR
USA Hockey	NR	NR	NR	NR	NR	NR	NR	NR	NR	NR	NR	NR	–	NR	NR	NR	NR	NR	NR	NR	NR	NR	NR	NR	NR	NR	NR

Note: USCHO did not release a poll in weeks 11 and 25.
Note: USA Hockey did not release a poll in week 12.

== Awards and honors ==
Player	Award	Ref
Trey Tayor	ECAC Hockey Best Defensive Defenseman	
Trey Taylor	ECAC Hockey Second Team	
Dalton Bancroft	ECAC Hockey Third Team	
Mathieu Gosselin	ECAC Hockey Third Team	

== 2024 NHL entry draft ==
Round	Pick	Player	NHL team
5	154	Jonathan Morello ^{†}	Boston Bruins
7	200	Matt Lahey ^{†}	Toronto Maple Leafs

† incoming freshman
