= Clarkson–St. Lawrence men's ice hockey rivalry =

College sports rivalry

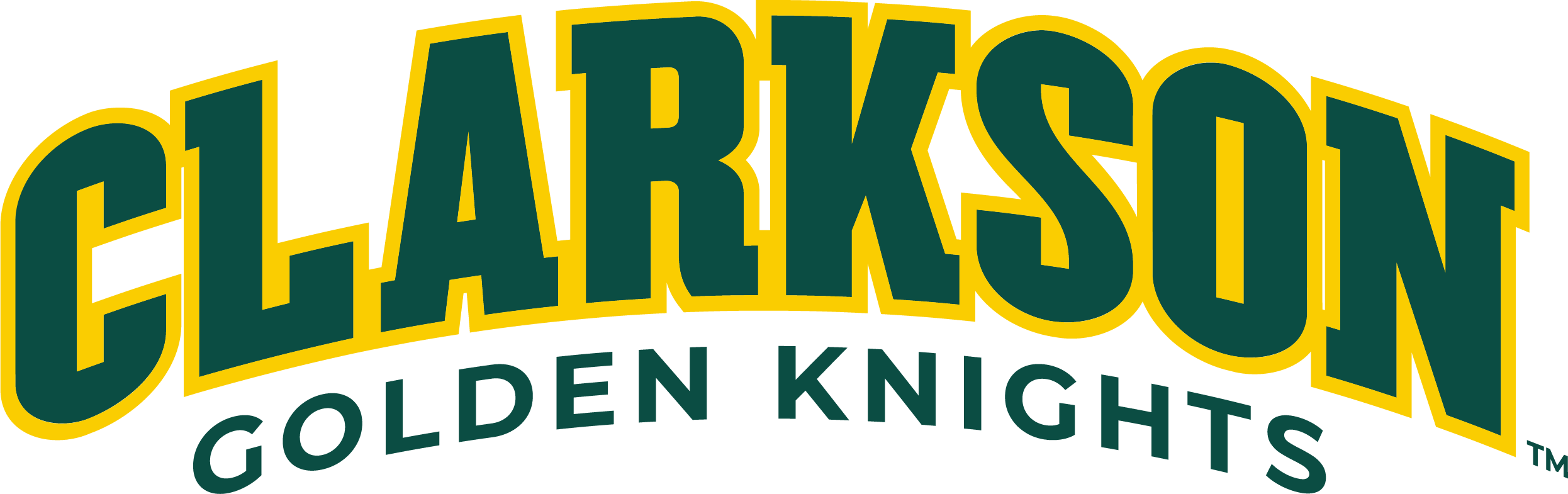
- Clarkson Golden Knights St. Lawrence Saints
- Sport: Ice hockey
- First meeting: February 13, 1926; Clarkson 1, St. Lawrence 0
- Latest meeting: 27 January 2024; St. Lawrence 2, Clarkson 1
- Next meeting: TBA
- Stadiums: Cheel Arena; Appleton Arena

Statistics
- Total meetings: 221
- All-time series: Clarkson, 133–76–12 (.629)
- Largest victory: Clarkson, 17–0 (15 February 1930); Clarkson, 19–2 (26 February 1941)
- Longest win streak: Clarkson, 11 (30 November 1974 – 24 January 1978
- Current win streak: St. Lawrence, 1 (27 January 2024 – present)

Locations of Clarkson and St. Lawrence

The Clarkson–St. Lawrence men's ice hockey rivalry is a college ice hockey rivalry between the Clarkson Golden Knights men's ice hockey and St. Lawrence Saints men's ice hockey programs. The first meeting between the two occurred on February 13, 1926, the first game in the history of St. Lawrence's program.

== History ==
Clarkson was one of the bevy of teams who began their ice hockey program shortly after the end of World War I. Five years later, St. Lawrence founded its program and, with less than ten miles separating the two campuses, they swiftly became rivals. They played one another at least once a year until warm weather and the Great Depression forced the Larries to suspend operations. The rivalry was eventually renewed in 1941 but World War II caused a second interruption in the series. In 1950 both schools were founding members of the Tri-State League, the first official conference for NCAA ice hockey. They remained in the league for over a decade until all three remaining teams were absorbed during the formation of ECAC Hockey in 1961. Being in the same conference for several decades has led to both teams playing one another on a consistent basis as well as common but infrequent postseason meetings.

From 1970 through 1982, Clarkson and St. Lawrence jointly held the North Country Thanksgiving Festival, an in-season tournament.

== Game results ==
Full game results for the rivalry, with rankings beginning in the 1998–99 season.

Clarkson victories	St. Lawrence victories	Tie games

No.	Date	Location	Winning team		Losing team		Notes
1	13 February 1926	Ives Park; Potsdam, NY	Clarkson	1	St. Lawrence	0	First varsity game for St. Lawrence
2	27 February 1926	Weeks Field Rink; Canton, NY	Clarkson	3	St. Lawrence	1	
3	22 January 1927	Ives Park; Potsdam, NY	Clarkson	10	St. Lawrence	1	
4	26 February 1927	Weeks Field Rink; Canton, NY	Clarkson	3	St. Lawrence	0	
5	25 January 1928	Ives Park; Potsdam, NY	Clarkson	6	St. Lawrence	0	
6	12 January 1929	Weeks Field Rink; Canton, NY	Clarkson	3	St. Lawrence	2	
7	23 February 1929	Ives Park; Potsdam, NY	Clarkson	6	St. Lawrence	1	
8	15 February 1930	Brewer Field Rink; Canton, NY	Clarkson	17	St. Lawrence	0	
9	26 February 1941	Clarkson Arena; Potsdam, NY	Clarkson	19	St. Lawrence	2	
10	6 February 1943	St. Lawrence Rink; Canton, NY	St. Lawrence	12	Clarkson	9	
11	20 February 1943	Clarkson Arena; Potsdam, NY	Clarkson	5	St. Lawrence	3	
12	7 January 1947	Clarkson Arena; Potsdam, NY	Clarkson	14	St. Lawrence	5	
13	30 January 1947	St. Lawrence Rink; Canton, NY	St. Lawrence	3	Clarkson	2	
14	22 January 1948	Clarkson Arena; Potsdam, NY	Clarkson	5	St. Lawrence	4	
15	3 February 1948	Clarkson Arena; Potsdam, NY	St. Lawrence	7	Clarkson	5	
16	19 January 1949	Clarkson Arena; Potsdam, NY	Clarkson	5	St. Lawrence	4	
17	17 February 1949	St. Lawrence Rink; Canton, NY	St. Lawrence	6	Clarkson	3	
18	10 January 1950	St. Lawrence Rink; Canton, NY	St. Lawrence	12	Clarkson	6	
19	21 February 1950	Clarkson Arena; Potsdam, NY	St. Lawrence	5	Clarkson	3	
20	9 January 1951	Clarkson Arena; Potsdam, NY	St. Lawrence	5	Clarkson	1	Tri-State League play begins
21	7 March 1951	Appleton Arena; Canton, NY	Clarkson	7	St. Lawrence	3	
22	20 February 1952	Clarkson Arena; Potsdam, NY	St. Lawrence	4	Clarkson	2	
23	5 March 1952	Appleton Arena; Canton, NY	St. Lawrence	11	Clarkson	1	
24	13 January 1953	Clarkson Arena; Potsdam, NY	St. Lawrence	7	Clarkson	0	
25	3 March 1953	Appleton Arena; Canton, NY	St. Lawrence	7	Clarkson	2	
26	10 February 1954	Clarkson Arena; Potsdam, NY	St. Lawrence	6	Clarkson	2	
27	2 March 1954	Appleton Arena; Canton, NY	St. Lawrence	8	Clarkson	2	
28	15 February 1955	Clarkson Arena; Potsdam, NY	St. Lawrence	6	Clarkson	5	
29	2 March 1955	Appleton Arena; Canton, NY	St. Lawrence	2	Clarkson	1	(OT)
30	10 January 1956	Appleton Arena; Canton, NY	Clarkson	8	St. Lawrence	3	
31	6 March 1956	Clarkson Arena; Potsdam, NY	Clarkson	8	St. Lawrence	4	
32	17 January 1957	Clarkson Arena; Potsdam, NY	Clarkson	5	St. Lawrence	4	
33	6 March 1957	Appleton Arena; Canton, NY	St. Lawrence	3	Clarkson	1	
34	15 January 1958	Clarkson Arena; Potsdam, NY	Clarkson	4	St. Lawrence	1	
35	5 March 1958	Appleton Arena; Canton, NY	Clarkson	4	St. Lawrence	3	(OT)
36	14 January 1959	Appleton Arena; Canton, NY	St. Lawrence	6	Clarkson	5	(OT)
37	4 March 1959	Clarkson Arena; Potsdam, NY	St. Lawrence	5	Clarkson	4	
38	13 January 1960	Clarkson Arena; Potsdam, NY	St. Lawrence	7	Clarkson	4	
39	2 March 1960	Appleton Arena; Canton, NY	St. Lawrence	3	Clarkson	2	
40	12 January 1961	Appleton Arena; Canton, NY	St. Lawrence	3	Clarkson	2	
41	28 February 1961	Clarkson Arena; Potsdam, NY	Clarkson	6	St. Lawrence	2	
42	22 December 1961	Madison Square Garden; New York, NY	Clarkson	6	St. Lawrence	5	(OT), ECAC Holiday Hockey Festival championship
43	10 January 1962	Clarkson Arena; Potsdam, NY	Tie	4	Tie	4	(OT), ECAC Hockey play begins
44	27 February 1962	Appleton Arena; Canton, NY	Clarkson	6	St. Lawrence	4	
45	10 March 1962	Boston Garden; Boston, MA	St. Lawrence	5	Clarkson	2	ECAC championship
46	8 January 1963	Appleton Arena; Canton, NY	St. Lawrence	3	Clarkson	2	(OT)
47	27 February 1963	Clarkson Arena; Potsdam, NY	Tie	3	Tie	3	(OT)
48	9 March 1963	Boston Garden; Boston, MA	Clarkson	7	St. Lawrence	5	ECAC consolation game
49	7 January 1964	Clarkson Arena; Potsdam, NY	Tie	2	Tie	2	(OT)
50	26 February 1964	Appleton Arena; Canton, NY	St. Lawrence	5	Clarkson	2	
51	12 January 1965	Appleton Arena; Canton, NY	Clarkson	4	St. Lawrence	2	
52	3 March 1965	Clarkson Arena; Potsdam, NY	Clarkson	4	St. Lawrence	0	
53	10 January 1966	Clarkson Arena; Potsdam, NY	Clarkson	6	St. Lawrence	4	
54	2 March 1966	Appleton Arena; Canton, NY	Clarkson	3	St. Lawrence	1	
55	19 December 1966	Madison Square Garden; New York, NY	Clarkson	5	St. Lawrence	2	ECAC Holiday Hockey Festival round robin
56	14 January 1967	Appleton Arena; Canton, NY	Tie	4	Tie	4	(OT)
57	25 February 1967	Clarkson Arena; Potsdam, NY	St. Lawrence	6	Clarkson	3	
58	19 December 1967	Madison Square Garden; New York, NY	St. Lawrence	8	Clarkson	4	ECAC Holiday Hockey Festival consolation game
59	9 January 1968	Clarkson Arena; Potsdam, NY	Clarkson	8	St. Lawrence	4	
60	27 February 1968	Appleton Arena; Canton, NY	Clarkson	8	St. Lawrence	5	
61	14 January 1969	Appleton Arena; Canton, NY	Clarkson	7	St. Lawrence	6	
62	25 February 1969	Clarkson Arena; Potsdam, NY	St. Lawrence	4	Clarkson	3	
63	3 December 1969	Clarkson Arena; Potsdam, NY	Clarkson	5	St. Lawrence	2	
64	25 February 1970	Appleton Arena; Canton, NY	Clarkson	4	St. Lawrence	3	(OT)
65	28 November 1970	Appleton Arena; Canton, NY	Clarkson	4	St. Lawrence	2	North Country Thanksgiving Festival round robin
66	9 December 1970	Clarkson Arena; Potsdam, NY	Clarkson	4	St. Lawrence	1	
67	24 February 1971	Appleton Arena; Canton, NY	Clarkson	3	St. Lawrence	2	
68	27 November 1971	Appleton Arena; Canton, NY	St. Lawrence	3	Clarkson	2	North Country Thanksgiving Festival round robin
69	8 December 1971	Clarkson Arena; Potsdam, NY	St. Lawrence	4	Clarkson	3	
70	23 February 1972	Appleton Arena; Canton, NY	Clarkson	5	St. Lawrence	3	Tri-State League play ends
71	25 November 1972	Appleton Arena; Canton, NY	St. Lawrence	6	Clarkson	2	North Country Thanksgiving Festival round robin
72	20 December 1972	Madison Square Garden; New York, NY	Clarkson	6	St. Lawrence	4	ECAC Holiday Hockey Festival consolation game
73	23 January 1973	Appleton Arena; Canton, NY	St. Lawrence	5	Clarkson	4	
74	21 February 1973	Clarkson Arena; Potsdam, NY	Clarkson	6	St. Lawrence	3	
75	24 November 1973	Appleton Arena; Canton, NY	Clarkson	4	St. Lawrence	1	North Country Thanksgiving Festival round robin
76	22 January 1974	Clarkson Arena; Potsdam, NY	Clarkson	3	St. Lawrence	2	
77	20 February 1974	Appleton Arena; Canton, NY	St. Lawrence	5	Clarkson	2	
78	30 November 1974	Appleton Arena; Canton, NY	Clarkson	8	St. Lawrence	1	North Country Thanksgiving Festival consolation game
79	21 January 1975	Appleton Arena; Canton, NY	Clarkson	6	St. Lawrence	4	
80	19 February 1975	Clarkson Arena; Potsdam, NY	Clarkson	8	St. Lawrence	5	
81	29 November 1975	Appleton Arena; Canton, NY	Clarkson	5	St. Lawrence	1	North Country Thanksgiving Festival round robin
82	20 January 1976	Walker Arena; Potsdam, NY	Clarkson	5	St. Lawrence	4	(OT)
83	6 March 1976	Appleton Arena; Canton, NY	Clarkson	5	St. Lawrence	4	
84	28 November 1976	Appleton Arena; Canton, NY	Clarkson	7	St. Lawrence	1	North Country Thanksgiving Festival round robin
85	25 January 1977	Appleton Arena; Canton, NY	Clarkson	10	St. Lawrence	2	
86	4 March 1977	Walker Arena; Potsdam, NY	Clarkson	6	St. Lawrence	5	(OT)
87	26 November 1977	Appleton Arena; Canton, NY	Clarkson	6	St. Lawrence	3	North Country Thanksgiving Festival round robin
88	24 January 1978	Walker Arena; Potsdam, NY	Clarkson	10	St. Lawrence	3	
89	3 March 1978	Appleton Arena; Canton, NY	St. Lawrence	9	Clarkson	4	
90	26 November 1978	Appleton Arena; Canton, NY	Clarkson	11	St. Lawrence	4	North Country Thanksgiving Festival round robin
91	23 January 1979	Appleton Arena; Canton, NY	Clarkson	11	St. Lawrence	5	
92	2 March 1979	Walker Arena; Potsdam, NY	Clarkson	7	St. Lawrence	5	
93	24 November 1979	Appleton Arena; Canton, NY	Clarkson	6	St. Lawrence	5	North Country Thanksgiving Festival round robin
94	1 December 1979	Walker Arena; Potsdam, NY	Clarkson	12	St. Lawrence	3	
95	26 February 1980	Appleton Arena; Canton, NY	St. Lawrence	5	Clarkson	2	
96	24 November 1980	Walker Arena; Potsdam, NY	Clarkson	6	St. Lawrence	5	North Country Thanksgiving Festival round robin
97	3 February 1981	Appleton Arena; Canton, NY	Clarkson	8	St. Lawrence	6	
98	3 March 1981	Walker Arena; Potsdam, NY	Clarkson	3	St. Lawrence	2	(OT)
99	14 November 1981	Glens Falls Civic Center; Glens Falls, NY	Clarkson	5	St. Lawrence	3	Empire Cup championship
100	28 November 1981	Appleton Arena; Canton, NY	Clarkson	5	St. Lawrence	4	North Country Thanksgiving Festival round robin
101	5 February 1982	Walker Arena; Potsdam, NY	Clarkson	6	St. Lawrence	4	
102	3 March 1982	Appleton Arena; Canton, NY	St. Lawrence	4	Clarkson	3	
103	13 November 1982	Glens Falls Civic Center; Glens Falls, NY	Clarkson	5	St. Lawrence	4	Empire Cup consolation game
104	26 January 1983	Walker Arena; Potsdam, NY	Clarkson	6	St. Lawrence	2	
105	28 February 1983	Appleton Arena; Canton, NY	Clarkson	7	St. Lawrence	1	
106	4 March 1983	Appleton Arena; Canton, NY	St. Lawrence	5	Clarkson	3	ECAC quarterfinal game 1
107	5 March 1983	Appleton Arena; Canton, NY	Clarkson	2	St. Lawrence	1	ECAC quarterfinal game 2 (Note: The series tie was broken by a mini-game played immediately after the second contest. Mini-games were not official matches and were only played to determine which team advanced. St. Lawrence won the mini-game 3–0)
108	3 February 1984	Walker Arena; Potsdam, NY	Clarkson	6	St. Lawrence	4	
109	28 February 1984	Appleton Arena; Canton, NY	Clarkson	4	St. Lawrence	3	
110	12 December 1984	Appleton Arena; Canton, NY	Clarkson	4	St. Lawrence	3	
111	18 January 1985	Walker Arena; Potsdam, NY	Clarkson	5	St. Lawrence	2	
112	8 March 1985	Walker Arena; Potsdam, NY	Clarkson	6	St. Lawrence	2	ECAC quarterfinal game 1
113	9 March 1985	Walker Arena; Potsdam, NY	Tie	4	Tie	4	ECAC quarterfinal game 2
114	30 November 1985	Glens Falls Civic Center; Glens Falls, NY	St. Lawrence	7	Clarkson	4	Empire Cup championship
115	11 December 1985	Walker Arena; Potsdam, NY	Clarkson	10	St. Lawrence	1	
116	29 December 1985	1980 Olympic Arena; Lake Placid, NY	Clarkson	4	St. Lawrence	3	KeyBank Tournament consolation game
117	17 January 1986	Appleton Arena; Canton, NY	St. Lawrence	6	Clarkson	5	(OT)
118	10 December 1986	Appleton Arena; Canton, NY	Clarkson	4	St. Lawrence	3	
119	17 January 1987	Walker Arena; Potsdam, NY	Tie	1	Tie	1	
120	9 December 1987	Walker Arena; Potsdam, NY	St. Lawrence	2	Clarkson	1	
121	16 January 1988	Appleton Arena; Canton, NY	St. Lawrence	8	Clarkson	4	
122	13 March 1988	Boston Garden; Boston, MA	St. Lawrence	3	Clarkson	0	ECAC championship
123	12 December 1988	Appleton Arena; Canton, NY	St. Lawrence	7	Clarkson	1	
124	17 January 1989	Walker Arena; Potsdam, NY	Clarkson	4	St. Lawrence	3	
125	28 November 1989	Walker Arena; Potsdam, NY	St. Lawrence	5	Clarkson	4	(OT)
126	20 January 1990	Appleton Arena; Canton, NY	Clarkson	3	St. Lawrence	2	
127	2 March 1990	Walker Arena; Potsdam, NY	Clarkson	4	St. Lawrence	1	ECAC quarterfinal game 1
128	3 March 1990	Walker Arena; Potsdam, NY	Clarkson	5	St. Lawrence	2	ECAC quarterfinal game 2
129	27 November 1990	Appleton Arena; Canton, NY	St. Lawrence	6	Clarkson	5	(OT)
130	19 January 1991	Walker Arena; Potsdam, NY	Clarkson	3	St. Lawrence	0	
131	10 March 1991	Boston Garden; Boston, MA	Clarkson	5	St. Lawrence	3	ECAC championship
132	13 December 1991	Cheel Arena; Potsdam, NY	St. Lawrence	4	Clarkson	3	
133	24 January 1992	Appleton Arena; Canton, NY	St. Lawrence	5	Clarkson	0	
134	23 January 1993	Appleton Arena; Canton, NY	Clarkson	6	St. Lawrence	0	
135	30 January 1993	Cheel Arena; Potsdam, NY	Clarkson	4	St. Lawrence	1	
136	13 March 1993	Cheel Arena; Potsdam, NY	Clarkson	3	St. Lawrence	1	ECAC quarterfinal game 1
137	13 March 1993	Cheel Arena; Potsdam, NY	Clarkson	5	St. Lawrence	3	ECAC quarterfinal game 2
138	4 December 1993	Cheel Arena; Potsdam, NY	Clarkson	5	St. Lawrence	3	
139	11 December 1993	Appleton Arena; Canton, NY	Clarkson	4	St. Lawrence	2	
140	3 December 1994	Appleton Arena; Canton, NY	Clarkson	8	St. Lawrence	4	
141	10 December 1994	Cheel Arena; Potsdam, NY	Clarkson	9	St. Lawrence	2	
142	18 November 1995	Cheel Arena; Potsdam, NY	Clarkson	6	St. Lawrence	4	
143	27 January 1996	Appleton Arena; Canton, NY	St. Lawrence	3	Clarkson	2	
144	16 November 1996	Appleton Arena; Canton, NY	Clarkson	7	St. Lawrence	4	
145	25 January 1997	Cheel Arena; Potsdam, NY	Clarkson	8	St. Lawrence	3	
146	15 November 1997	Cheel Arena; Potsdam, NY	Clarkson	4	St. Lawrence	3	
147	24 January 1998	Appleton Arena; Canton, NY	Clarkson	1	St. Lawrence	0	
148	21 November 1998	Appleton Arena; Canton, NY	St. Lawrence	3	Clarkson	1	
149	23 January 1999	Cheel Arena; Potsdam, NY	Clarkson	5	St. Lawrence	4	
150	20 March 1999	Olympic Arena; Lake Placid, NY	No. 6 Clarkson	3	No. 10 St. Lawrence	2	ECAC championship
151	4 December 1999	Cheel Arena; Potsdam, NY	Tie	1	Tie	1	(OT)
152	22 January 2000	Appleton Arena; Canton, NY	St. Lawrence	7	Clarkson	3	
153	18 November 2000	Appleton Arena; Canton, NY	Clarkson	7	St. Lawrence	2	
154	30 January 2001	Cheel Arena; Potsdam, NY	St. Lawrence	4	No. 15 Clarkson	2	
155	3 November 2001	Cheel Arena; Potsdam, NY	Clarkson	7	St. Lawrence	6	(OT)
156	29 January 2002	Appleton Arena; Canton, NY	St. Lawrence	6	Clarkson	5	
157	8 March 2002	Cheel Arena; Potsdam, NY	Clarkson	3	St. Lawrence	1	ECAC first round game 1
158	9 March 2002	Cheel Arena; Potsdam, NY	Clarkson	6	St. Lawrence	1	ECAC first round game 2
159	2 November 2002	Appleton Arena; Canton, NY	St. Lawrence	2	Clarkson	1	
160	18 January 2003	Cheel Arena; Potsdam, NY	St. Lawrence	3	Clarkson	2	
161	22 November 2003	Cheel Arena; Potsdam, NY	Clarkson	3	St. Lawrence	1	
162	24 January 2004	Appleton Arena; Canton, NY	St. Lawrence	5	Clarkson	4	
163	17 November 2004	Appleton Arena; Canton, NY	St. Lawrence	3	Clarkson	1	
164	15 January 2005	Cheel Arena; Potsdam, NY	St. Lawrence	7	Clarkson	2	
165	7 January 2006	Corel Center; Ottawa, ON	Clarkson	6	No. 11 St. Lawrence	2	
166	27 January 2006	Cheel Arena; Potsdam, NY	Clarkson	3	No. 14 St. Lawrence	2	
167	28 January 2006	Appleton Arena; Canton, NY	No. 14 St. Lawrence	5	Clarkson	4	
168	5 December 2006	Cheel Arena; Potsdam, NY	No. 17 Clarkson	3	St. Lawrence	1	
169	23 January 2007	Appleton Arena; Canton, NY	No. 10 Clarkson	6	No. 17 St. Lawrence	2	
170	7 October 2007	Appleton Arena; Canton, NY	No. 16 St. Lawrence	3	No. 7 Clarkson	2	
171	20 October 2007	Cheel Arena; Potsdam, NY	No. 7 Clarkson	5	No. 15 St. Lawrence	4	(OT)
172	1 December 2007	Appleton Arena; Canton, NY	St. Lawrence	4	No. 9 Clarkson	2	
173	10 January 2009	Appleton Arena; Canton, NY	St. Lawrence	5	Clarkson	1	
174	11 January 2009	Cheel Arena; Potsdam, NY	St. Lawrence	2	Clarkson	1	
175	6 February 2009	Appleton Arena; Canton, NY	Tie	3	Tie	3	(OT)
176	7 February 2009	Cheel Arena; Potsdam, NY	Clarkson	3	No. 20 St. Lawrence	1	
177	24 October 2009	Cheel Arena; Potsdam, NY	Clarkson	4	St. Lawrence	1	
178	4 December 2009	Appleton Arena; Canton, NY	Tie	3	Tie	3	(OT)
179	5 December 2009	Cheel Arena; Potsdam, NY	St. Lawrence	4	Clarkson	3	
180	5 March 2010	Appleton Arena; Canton, NY	St. Lawrence	3	Clarkson	2	(OT), ECAC first round game 1
181	6 March 2010	Appleton Arena; Canton, NY	Clarkson	4	St. Lawrence	3	(OT), ECAC first round game 2
182	7 March 2010	Appleton Arena; Canton, NY	St. Lawrence	3	Clarkson	2	ECAC first round game 3
183	30 October 2010	Olympic Arena; Lake Placid, NY	Clarkson	2	St. Lawrence	1	(OT), Halloween Faceoff
184	20 November 2010	Cheel Arena; Potsdam, NY	Clarkson	3	St. Lawrence	1	
185	15 February 2011	Appleton Arena; Canton, NY	Clarkson	2	St. Lawrence	1	
186	6 December 2011	Appleton Arena; Canton, NY	Clarkson	4	St. Lawrence	3	
187	10 December 2011	Olympic Arena; Lake Placid, NY	St. Lawrence	4	Clarkson	1	Festivus Faceoff
188	21 January 2012	Cheel Arena; Potsdam, NY	Clarkson	4	St. Lawrence	3	
189	5 December 2012	Appleton Arena; Canton, NY	Clarkson	4	St. Lawrence	1	
190	8 December 2012	Olympic Arena; Lake Placid, NY	Clarkson	3	St. Lawrence	1	Festivus Faceoff
191	19 January 2013	Cheel Arena; Potsdam, NY	Tie	3	Tie	3	(OT)
192	6 December 2013	Cheel Arena; Potsdam, NY	No. 10 Clarkson	5	St. Lawrence	4	
193	7 December 2013	Appleton Arena; Canton, NY	No. 10 Clarkson	4	St. Lawrence	3	
194	31 October 2014	Appleton Arena; Canton, NY	Tie	2	Tie	2	(OT)
195	1 November 2014	Cheel Arena; Potsdam, NY	St. Lawrence	4	Clarkson	0	
196	6 December 2014	Appleton Arena; Canton, NY	Clarkson	2	St. Lawrence	1	
197	31 January 2015	Cheel Arena; Potsdam, NY	Clarkson	2	St. Lawrence	1	
198	13 November 2015	Appleton Arena; Canton, NY	No. 15 St. Lawrence	3	No. 19 Clarkson	0	
199	12 January 2016	Cheel Arena; Potsdam, NY	Clarkson	3	No. 18 St. Lawrence	1	
200	11 March 2016	Appleton Arena; Canton, NY	No. 18 St. Lawrence	3	Clarkson	2	(OT), ECAC quarterfinal game 1
201	12 March 2016	Appleton Arena; Canton, NY	No. 18 St. Lawrence	3	Clarkson	2	(2OT), ECAC quarterfinal game 2
202	9 December 2016	Appleton Arena; Canton, NY	No. 19 St. Lawrence	3	Clarkson	1	
203	4 February 2017	Cheel Arena; Potsdam, NY	Clarkson	3	No. 14 St. Lawrence	1	
204	8 December 2017	Cheel Arena; Potsdam, NY	No. 3 Clarkson	3	St. Lawrence	1	
205	9 December 2017	Appleton Arena; Canton, NY	No. 3 Clarkson	4	St. Lawrence	2	
206	24 November 2018	Olympic Arena; Lake Placid, NY	Clarkson	6	St. Lawrence	2	
207	7 December 2018	Appleton Arena; Canton, NY	St. Lawrence	4	No. 16 Clarkson	2	
208	8 December 2018	Cheel Arena; Potsdam, NY	No. 16 Clarkson	3	St. Lawrence	0	
209	1 November 2019	Cheel Arena; Potsdam, NY	No. 11 Clarkson	4	St. Lawrence	3	(OT)
210	2 November 2019	Cheel Arena; Potsdam, NY	No. 11 Clarkson	3	St. Lawrence	2	(OT)
211	7 December 2019	Cheel Arena; Potsdam, NY	No. 5 Clarkson	3	St. Lawrence	1	
212	8 February 2020	Appleton Arena; Canton, NY	No. 5 Clarkson	2	St. Lawrence	0	
213	15 January 2021	Cheel Arena; Potsdam, NY	St. Lawrence	2	No. 13 Clarkson	1	(OT)
214	17 January 2021	Appleton Arena; Canton, NY	No. 13 Clarkson	2	St. Lawrence	1	
215	2 October 2021	Cheel Arena; Potsdam, NY	St. Lawrence	3	Clarkson	0	
216	28 January 2022	Cheel Arena; Potsdam, NY	Clarkson	1	St. Lawrence	0	
217	29 January 2022	Appleton Arena; Canton, NY	Tie	4	Tie	4	(OT)
218	27 January 2023	Appleton Arena; Canton, NY	St. Lawrence	4	Clarkson	2	
219	28 January 2023	Cheel Arena; Potsdam, NY	St. Lawrence	4	Clarkson	2	
220	26 January 2024	Cheel Arena; Potsdam, NY	Clarkson	4	St. Lawrence	1	
221	27 January 2024	Appleton Arena; Canton, NY	St. Lawrence	2	Clarkson	1	
Series: Clarkson leads 133–76–12

== Series facts ==
Statistic	Clarkson	St. Lawrence
Games played	221	
Wins	133	76
Home wins	69	47
Road wins	51	24
Neutral site wins	13	5
Goals scored	922	724
Most goals scored in a game by one team	19 (26 February 1941)	12 (6 February 1943, 10 January 1950)
Most goals in a game by both teams	21 (26 February 1941 – Clarkson 19, St. Lawrence 2), (6 February 1943 – St. Lawrence 12, Clarkson 9)	
Fewest goals in a game by both teams	1 (13 February 1926, 24 January 1998, 28 January 2022)	
Fewest goals scored in a game by one team in a win	1 (1926, 1998, 2022)	2 (1955, 1987, 2002, 2009, 2021)
Most goals scored in a game by one team in a loss	9 (6 February 1943)	6 (1969, 1981, 2001)
Largest margin of victory	17 (15 February 1930, 26 February 1941)	10 (5 March 1952)
Longest winning streak	11 (30 November 1974 – 24 January 1978)	8 (20 February 1952 – 2 March 1955)
Longest unbeaten streak	11 (30 November 1974 – 24 January 1978)	8 (20 February 1952 – 2 March 1955)
