= 2023–24 RPI Engineers men's ice hockey season =

- Conference: 12th ECAC Hockey
- Home ice: Houston Field House

Rankings
- USCHO: NR
- USA Hockey: NR

Record
- Overall: 10–23–4
- Conference: 6–13–3
- Home: 4–9–3
- Road: 6–13–1
- Neutral: 0–1–0

Coaches and captains
- Head coach: Dave Smith
- Assistant coaches: Mathias Lange; Chuck Weber; Kārlis Zirnis
- Captain: Jake Gagnon

The 2023–24 RPI Engineers Men's ice hockey season was the 104th season of play for the program and the 62nd in ECAC Hockey. The Engineers represented Rensselaer Polytechnic Institute, played their home games at Houston Field House and were coached by Dave Smith in his 6th season.

== Season ==
From the very start of the season, Rensselaer encountered a problem that would plague them all year long. In their first four games, the defense surrendered a veritable avalanche of shots to the opposing teams. While their opposition at this time would all end up finishing the year ranked in the top 20, the porous defense persisted. Their three goaltenders, who weren't brilliant to begin with, suffered as a result. RPI allowed at least 4 goals in ten of their first twelve games and gave the team little chance to win from night to night. At one point, the team turned to Brett Miller, a senior who had seen very little playing time in his college career, as starter but that experiment lasted just a few games. It wasn't until after Christmas that the Watson was able to settle down and string together some decent performances.

After winning four of five coming out of the winter break, Rensselaer miraculously found itself in the middle of the conference standings. The reprieve, however, was short-lived. The defense faltered and team won just twice in its final fourteen games. The Engineers stumbled to a last-place finish in ECAC Hockey and entered the postseason with no momentum or expectations. However, once the postseason began, RPI found itself with an opportunity. Rensselaer was pitted against its long-time rival, Clarkson, and they relished the chance to ruin the Golden Knights' season. The Engineers scored twice in the first period to take an early lead all the while letting Clarkson sleep-walk through the opening 40 minutes. After Sutter Muzzatti increased the team's lead in third, the Knights finally fought back and ended up firing 22 shots in the third period. They managed to get the puck past Watson twice but he held up over the final two minutes and carried the Engineers to victory.

The rather surprising upset caused RPI to be set against defending national champion Quinnipiac in the quarterfinals. The first match was entirely controlled by the Bobcats but RPI gave a good performance in the rematch. The match remained close throughout until Quinnipiac scored two-empty-net goals in the final 70 seconds.

Rensselaer finished the season with one of its worst defensive performances. RPI had allowed more than 4 goals against on average and were the second-worst defensive team that season. Only Stonehill, who was in the process of transitioning from Division II, was worse.

== Departures ==
Player	Position	Nationality	Cause
Kyle Hallbauer	Defenseman	United States	Graduation (signed with Adirondack Thunder)
Louis Helsen	Defenseman	United States	Graduation (retired)
Rory Herrman	Forward	United States	Graduation (signed with Cardiff Devils)
Mason Klee	Defenseman	United States	Graduate transfer to Ohio State
Reid Leibold	Defenseman	United States	Left program (retired)
Ryan Mahshie	Forward	Canada	Graduate transfer to Connecticut
James McIsaac	Forward	Canada	Left program (retired)
Henri Schreifels	Forward	United States	Transferred to Stonehill
T. J. Walsh	Forward	United States	Graduate transfer to Sacred Heart

== Recruiting ==
Player	Position	Nationality	Age	Notes
Ryan Brushett	Forward	Canada	25	Verdun, QC; graduate transfer from Massachusetts Lowell
Tyler Hotson	Forward	Canada	20	Stratford, ON
Jimmy Goffredo	Defenseman	United States	20	Mount Laurel, NJ; joined team mid-season
Lucas Matta	Defenseman	Canada	20	Kleinburg, ON; transfer from Western Michigan
Brad McNeil	Forward	United States	21	Royal Oak, MI
Jérémie Payant	Forward	Canada	20	Saint-Lazare, QC
C. J. Regula	Defenseman	United States	25	West Bloomfield, MI; graduate transfer from Ohio State
Nathan Sullivan	Forward	United States	19	Calgary, AB
Dovar Tinling	Forward	Canada	20	Pointe-Claire, QC; transfer from Vermont

== Roster ==
As of September 19, 2023.

No.	Nat.	Player	Class	Pos	Height	Weight	DoB	Hometown	Previous team	NHL rights
1	(Canada)	Carson Cherepak	Sophomore	G	6' 0" (1.83 m)	170 lb (77 kg)	2002-10-09	Winnipeg, Manitoba	Dauphin Kings (MJHL)	—
2	(United States)	Jimmy Goffredo	Freshman	D	5' 11" (1.8 m)	185 lb (84 kg)	2003-04-24	Mount Laurel, New Jersey	Des Moines Buccaneers (USHL)	—
3	(Finland)	Lauri Sertti	Senior	D	6' 2" (1.88 m)	200 lb (91 kg)	1999-07-11	Espoo, Finland	Amarillo Bulls (NAHL)	—
6	(Canada)	Jack Agnew	Senior	D	5' 11" (1.8 m)	195 lb (88 kg)	2001-10-22	Oakville, Ontario	Boston College (HEA)	—
7	(United States)	Max Smolinski	Sophomore	F	5' 11" (1.8 m)	180 lb (82 kg)	2003-04-02	Bloomfield Hills, Michigan	Fargo Force (USHL)	—
8	(United States)	C. J. Regula	Graduate	D	6' 3" (1.91 m)	205 lb (93 kg)	1998-05-29	Bloomfield Hills, Michigan	Ohio State (Big Ten)	—
9	(Canada)	Ryan Brushett	Graduate	F	6' 0" (1.83 m)	185 lb (84 kg)	1998-06-14	Montreal, Quebec	Massachusetts Lowell (HEA)	—
10	(United States)	Dylan Davies	Senior	D	6' 3" (1.91 m)	195 lb (88 kg)	2001-02-09	Traverse City, Michigan	Sioux Falls Stampede (USHL)	—
11	(Canada)	Nick Ardanaz	Sophomore	D	5' 10" (1.78 m)	175 lb (79 kg)	2002-05-30	Surrey, British Columbia	West Kelowna Warriors (BCHL)	—
12	(United States)	Austin Heidemann	Senior	F	6' 0" (1.83 m)	195 lb (88 kg)	1999-06-27	Blaine, Minnesota	Mercyhurst (AHA)	—
14	(Canada)	John Evans	Sophomore	F	5' 10" (1.78 m)	150 lb (68 kg)	2002-04-08	South Surrey, British Columbia	West Kelowna Warriors (BCHL)	—
15	(Finland)	Altti Nykänen	Senior	F	6' 3" (1.91 m)	200 lb (91 kg)	2001-09-26	Vihti, Finland	Bishop's College School (CISAA)	—
17	(Canada)	John Beaton	Senior	F	6' 2" (1.88 m)	190 lb (86 kg)	2000-10-30	Stittsville, Ontario	Youngstown Phantoms (USHL)	—
18	(Canada)	Jakob Lee	Senior	F	6' 0" (1.83 m)	190 lb (86 kg)	1999-02-12	Owen Sound, Ontario	Merrimack (HEA)	—
19	(United States)	Sutter Muzzatti	Sophomore	F	6' 6" (1.98 m)	240 lb (109 kg)	2003-06-28	Okemos, Michigan	Austin Bruins (NAHL)	NSH, 143rd overall 2023
20	(Canada)	Nathan Sullivan	Freshman	F	6' 3" (1.91 m)	191 lb (87 kg)	2004-05-31	Calgary, Alberta	Camrose Kodiaks (AJHL)	—
22	(Canada)	Danny Ciccarello	Sophomore	F	6' 0" (1.83 m)	200 lb (91 kg)	2001-03-23	Kirkland, Quebec	Fort McMurray Oil Barons (AJHL)	—
23	(United States)	Nick Strom	Junior	D	6' 0" (1.83 m)	190 lb (86 kg)	2000-03-21	Dayton, Minnesota	Western Michigan (NCHC)	—
24	(United States)	Jack Brackett	Senior	F	5' 10" (1.78 m)	180 lb (82 kg)	2000-12-31	Manassas, Virginia	Maryland Black Bears (NAHL)	—
25	(Canada)	Dovar Tinling	Junior	F	5' 11" (1.8 m)	185 lb (84 kg)	2003-03-03	Pointe-Claire, Quebec	Penticton Vees (BCHL)	—
27	(Canada)	Jake Gagnon (C)	Senior	F	5' 10" (1.78 m)	175 lb (79 kg)	1999-11-04	Pointe-Claire, Quebec	Wellington Dukes (OJHL)	—
28	(Canada)	Tyler Hotson	Freshman	F	6' 0" (1.83 m)	163 lb (74 kg)	2003-03-17	Stratford, Ontario	Sioux City Musketeers (USHL)	—
29	(Canada)	Brendan Budy	Graduate	F	5' 11" (1.8 m)	190 lb (86 kg)	2000-06-06	Langley, British Columbia	North Dakota (NCHC)	—
30	(United States)	Brett Miller	Senior	G	6' 2" (1.88 m)	185 lb (84 kg)	1999-04-26	Northville, Michigan	Austin Bruins (NAHL)	—
34	(Canada)	Jack Watson	Junior	G	6' 3" (1.91 m)	195 lb (88 kg)	2000-03-14	Toronto, Ontario	Coquitlam Express (BCHL)	—
43	(United States)	Brad McNeil	Freshman	F	6' 0" (1.83 m)	181 lb (82 kg)	2002-03-15	Royal Oak, Michigan	Maryland Black Bears (NAHL)	—
51	(Canada)	Finn Brown	Sophomore	F	6' 3" (1.91 m)	195 lb (88 kg)	2002-04-06	Toronto, Ontario	Alberni Valley Bulldogs (BCHL)	—
61	(Canada)	Lucas Matta	Sophomore	D	6' 2" (1.88 m)	185 lb (84 kg)	2002-10-04	Kleinburg, Ontario	Western Michigan (BCHL)	—
71	(Canada)	Jérémie Payant	Freshman	F	5' 10" (1.78 m)	170 lb (77 kg)	2002-10-07	Saint-Lazare, Quebec	Nanaimo Clippers (BCHL)	—

== Standings ==
2023–24 ECAC Hockey Standings
	Conference record										Overall record					
	GP	W	L	T	OTW	OTL	SW	PTS	GF	GA	GP	W	L	T	GF	GA
#6 Quinnipiac †	22	17	4	1	0	2	0	54	99	39	39	27	10	2	160	79
#9 Cornell *	22	12	6	4	1	2	3	44	74	45	35	22	7	6	115	65
Colgate	22	13	7	2	2	2	2	43	85	68	36	16	16	4	120	112
Dartmouth	22	9	6	7	1	1	3	37	66	60	32	13	10	9	92	91
Clarkson	22	12	9	1	4	2	1	36	62	58	35	18	16	1	95	97
Union	22	9	10	3	1	1	2	32	75	75	37	16	18	3	123	121
St. Lawrence	22	8	10	4	1	1	1	29	49	64	39	14	19	6	90	118
Harvard	22	6	10	6	1	2	3	28	49	64	32	7	19	6	70	106
Princeton	22	8	11	3	4	0	2	25	70	90	30	10	16	4	89	114
Yale	22	7	13	2	1	2	1	25	46	57	30	10	18	2	63	91
Brown	22	6	14	2	2	3	1	22	43	69	30	8	19	3	61	98
Rensselaer	22	6	13	3	0	0	0	21	58	89	37	10	23	4	93	150
Championship: March 23, 2024 † indicates conference regular season champion (Cleary Cup) * indicates conference tournament champion (Whitelaw Cup); Rankings: USCHO.com Top 20 Poll

== Schedule and results ==
Date	Time	Opponent^{#}	Rank^{#}	Site	TV	Decision	Result	Attendance	Record
Exhibition
October 7	3:00 pm	Union*		Houston Field House • Troy, New York (Rivalry, Exhibition)	ESPN+		T 2–2 ^{SOW}		
October 8	3:00 pm	Guelph*		Houston Field House • Troy, New York (Exhibition)	ESPN+		W 6–4		
Regular Season
October 12	7:00 pm	at Maine*		Alfond Arena • Orono, Maine	ESPN+	Watson	L 1–4	4,135	0–1–0
October 13	7:00 pm	at Maine*		Alfond Arena • Orono, Maine	ESPN+	Cherepak	L 3–6	5,143	0–2–0
October 20	7:00 pm	at #3 Boston College*		Conte Forum • Chestnut Hill, Massachusetts	ESPN+	Watson	L 1–6	5,802	0–3–0
October 21	7:00 pm	at #10 Providence*		Schneider Arena • Providence, Rhode Island	ESPN+	Cherepak	L 2–4	2,026	0–4–0
November 3	7:00 pm	at Union		Achilles Rink • Schenectady, New York (Rivalry)	ESPN+	Watson	W 8–6	1,979	1–4–0 (1–0–0)
November 4	7:00 pm	Union		Houston Field House • Troy, New York (Rivalry)	ESPN+	Cherepak	L 1–5	3,250	1–5–0 (1–1–0)
November 10	7:00 pm	at Clarkson		Cheel Arena • Potsdam, New York (Rivalry)	ESPN+	Cherepak	W 4–2	2,881	2–5–0 (2–1–0)
November 11	7:00 pm	at St. Lawrence		Appleton Arena • Canton, New York	ESPN+	Cherepak	L 4–2	1,386	2–6–0 (2–2–0)
November 25	7:00 pm	Northeastern*		Houston Field House • Troy, New York	ESPN+	Cherepak	T 3–3 ^{OT}	1,930	2–6–1
November 26	7:00 pm	Northeastern*		Houston Field House • Troy, New York	ESPN+	Cherepak	L 2–9	1,856	2–7–1
December 1	7:00 pm	#5 Quinnipiac		Houston Field House • Troy, New York	ESPN+	Cherepak	L 1–5	1,856	2–8–1 (2–3–0)
December 2	7:00 pm	Princeton		Houston Field House • Troy, New York	ESPN+	Miller	L 4–6	2,241	2–9–1 (2–4–0)
December 9	4:00 pm	at #16 New Hampshire*		Whittemore Center • Durham, New Hampshire	ESPN+	Miller	L 0–1	5,299	2–10–1
December 15	7:00 pm	Minnesota State*		Houston Field House • Troy, New York	ESPN+	Miller	W 4–3 ^{OT}	1,477	3–10–1
December 16	7:00 pm	Minnesota State*		Houston Field House • Troy, New York	ESPN+	Miller	L 2–4	1,635	3–11–1
December 29	3:00 pm	at Canisius*		LECOM Harborcenter • Buffalo, New York	FloHockey	Watson	W 6–3	719	4–11–1
December 30	1:00 pm	at Canisius*		LECOM Harborcenter • Buffalo, New York	FloHockey	Watson	W 2–1	735	5–11–1
January 5	7:00 pm	Yale		Houston Field House • Troy, New York	ESPN+	Miller	L 1–2	1,677	5–12–1 (2–5–0)
January 6	7:00 pm	Brown		Houston Field House • Troy, New York	ESPN+	Watson	W 2–1	1,572	6–12–1 (3–5–0)
January 12	7:00 pm	St. Lawrence		Houston Field House • Troy, New York	ESPN+	Watson	W 6–3	1,600	7–12–1 (4–5–0)
January 13	7:00 pm	Clarkson		Houston Field House • Troy, New York (Rivalry)	ESPN+	Watson	L 1–4	3,026	7–13–1 (4–6–0)
January 19	7:00 pm	at Harvard		Bright-Landry Hockey Center • Boston, Massachusetts	ESPN+	Watson	L 3–6	1,905	7–14–1 (4–7–0)
January 20	7:00 pm	at Dartmouth		Thompson Arena • Hanover, New Hampshire	ESPN+	Miller	L 2–6	1,578	7–15–1 (4–8–0)
January 27	6:00 pm	vs. Union*		MVP Arena • Albany, New York (Mayor's Cup)		Watson	L 3–5	5,698	7–16–1
February 2	7:00 pm	at Brown		Meehan Auditorium • Providence, Rhode Island	ESPN+	Watson	W 3–1	679	8–16–1 (5–8–0)
February 3	7:00 pm	at Yale		Ingalls Rink • New Haven, Connecticut	ESPN+	Watson	T 1–1 ^{SOL}	1,674	8–16–2 (5–8–1)
February 9	7:00 pm	#13 Cornell		Houston Field House • Troy, New York	ESPN+	Watson	L 1–4	2,317	8–17–2 (5–9–1)
February 10	7:00 pm	Colgate		Houston Field House • Troy, New York	ESPN+	Watson	T 5–5 ^{SOL}	4,290	8–17–3 (5–9–2)
February 16	7:00 pm	at Princeton		Hobey Baker Memorial Rink • Princeton, New Jersey	ESPN+	Watson	W 4–3	1,098	9–17–3 (6–9–2)
February 17	7:00 pm	at #9 Quinnipiac		M&T Bank Arena • Hamden, Connecticut	ESPN+	Watson	L 2–7	3,261	9–18–3 (6–10–2)
February 23	7:00 pm	Dartmouth		Houston Field House • Troy, New York	ESPN+	Watson	L 1–5	2,186	9–19–3 (6–11–2)
February 24	4:00 pm	Harvard		Houston Field House • Troy, New York	ESPN+	Watson	T 2–2 ^{SOL}	2,465	9–19–4 (6–11–3)
March 1	7:00 pm	at Colgate		Class of 1965 Arena • Hamilton, New York	ESPN+	Watson	L 2–6	908	9–20–4 (6–12–3)
March 2	7:00 pm	at #13 Cornell		Lynah Rink • Ithaca, New York	ESPN+	Watson	L 1–3	3,723	9–21–4 (6–13–3)
ECAC Hockey Tournament
March 9	7:00 pm	Clarkson*		Cheel Arena • Potsdam, New York (First Round, Rivalry)	ESPN+	Watson	W 3–2	2,834	10–21–4
March 15	7:00 pm	at #7 Quinnipiac*		M&T Bank Arena • Hamden, Connecticut (Quarterfinal Game 1)	ESPN+	Watson	L 1–5	2,721	10–22–4
March 16	7:00 pm	at #7 Quinnipiac*		M&T Bank Arena • Hamden, Connecticut (Quarterfinal Game 2)	ESPN+	Watson	L 2–5	2,909	10–23–4
*Non-conference game. ^{#}Rankings from USCHO.com Poll. All times are in Eastern Time. Source:

== Scoring statistics ==
Name	Position	Games	Goals	Assists	Points	PIM
Austin Heidemann	F	37	11	16	27	8
Sutter Muzzatti	F	33	10	15	25	79
Tyler Hotson	F	37	13	9	22	32
Ryan Brushett	C	37	6	15	21	14
Dovar Tinling	C	34	5	12	17	43
Jake Gagnon	RW	30	8	6	14	8
Max Smolinski	D	37	2	11	13	50
John Beaton	C	32	4	8	12	2
Jakob Lee	C	23	7	4	11	41
John Evans	F	16	4	6	10	2
Jack Brackett	F	33	1	8	9	4
Brad McNeil	F	36	4	4	8	9
Lauri Sertti	D	36	2	6	8	16
C. J. Regula	D	29	2	5	7	22
Jack Agnew	D	37	2	5	7	16
Nick Strom	D	37	0	7	7	10
Jimmy Goffredo	D	22	3	3	6	19
Danny Ciccarello	F	25	4	1	5	6
Jérémie Payant	C	19	2	2	4	10
Altti Nykänen	F	7	1	3	4	0
Nick Ardanaz	D	18	1	2	3	6
Lucas Matta	D	32	1	1	2	12
Finn Brown	LW	16	0	1	1	0
Nathan Sullivan	F	21	0	1	1	10
Dylan Davies	D/F	3	0	0	0	2
Brett Miller	G	7	0	0	0	0
Carson Cherepak	G	9	0	0	0	0
Brendan Budy	LW	15	0	0	0	8
Jack Watson	G	23	0	0	0	0
Total			95	152	247	429

== Goaltending statistics ==
Name	Games	Minutes	Wins	Losses	Ties	Goals against	Saves	Shut outs	SV %	GAA
Jack Watson	23	1351:41	8	12	3	81	681	0	.894	3.60
Brett Miller	7	397:00	1	5	0	25	198	0	.888	3.78
Carson Cherepak	9	473:53	1	6	1	34	242	0	.877	4.30
Empty Net	-	22:17	-	-	-	10	-	-	-	-
Total	37	2243:51	10	23	4	150	1121	0	.882	4.01

== Rankings ==
Poll	Week																										
Poll	Pre	1	2	3	4	5	6	7	8	9	10	11	12	13	14	15	16	17	18	19	20	21	22	23	24	25	26 (Final)
USCHO.com	NR	NR	NR	NR	NR	NR	NR	NR	NR	NR	NR	–	NR	NR	NR	NR	NR	NR	NR	NR	NR	NR	NR	NR	NR	–	NR
USA Hockey	NR	NR	NR	NR	NR	NR	NR	NR	NR	NR	NR	NR	–	NR	NR	NR	NR	NR	NR	NR	NR	NR	NR	NR	NR	NR	NR

Note: USCHO did not release a poll in weeks 11 and 25.
Note: USA Hockey did not release a poll in week 12.
