= 2023–24 Cornell Big Red men's ice hockey season =

Collegiate ice hockey season

ECAC Hockey Tournament, Champion NCAA Tournament, Regional Final
- Conference: 2nd ECAC Hockey
- Home ice: Lynah Rink

Rankings
- USCHO: #9
- USA Hockey: #9

Record
- Overall: 22–7–6
- Conference: 12–6–4
- Home: 11–3–3
- Road: 7–3–1
- Neutral: 4–1–2

Coaches and captains
- Head coach: Mike Schafer
- Assistant coaches: Ben Syer; Sean Flanagan
- Captain: Kyle Penney
- Alternate captain(s): Jack O'Leary; Gabriel Seger

The 2023–24 Cornell Big Red Men's ice hockey season was the 107th season of play for the program and 62nd in ECAC Hockey. The Big Red represented Cornell University in the 2023–24 NCAA Division I men's ice hockey season, played their home games at Lynah Rink and were coached by Mike Schafer in his 28th season.

== Season ==
Entering the season, Cornell was once again expected to be a defensive powerhouse. Starting goaltender Ian Shane was coming off of a tremendous sophomore season and the structure that Mike Schafer ran usually carried over year to year. The biggest unknown was the offense since the team had lost three of its top four scorers, but Cornell was also bringing in a talented crop of freshman that included five NHL draft picks. The Big Red started well with their first two weeks going to form; the defense was usually stout, allowing less than 20 shots per game, and the unperturbed Shane had no trouble staking Cornell to a 4–0 record. The offense was also performing about as well as could be expected and continued to be led by senior Gabriel Seger. While the offense flowed through the team's 1st-line center, several new players were proving to be quick studies early in the season. Jonathan Castagna, Ben Robertson and Ryan Walsh did their level best to replace the lost offense and the team benefitted greatly from their efforts.

While November had started out well, the Big Red ran into some trouble in the middle of the month. Scoring went down a bit but it was a few bad games from Shane that were the real problem. After tying Dartmouth, Cornell lost to their heated rival Harvard despite allowing just 16 shots in the game. Shane then followed up that performance with probably the worst game of his career and he allowed 3 goals on 9 shots in just over 10 minutes of action. Remington Keopple was inserted for the final two and a half periods but the backup goaltender was not up to the task of holding off defending national champions Quinnipiac. However, Keopple was still in goal for the following game and though he didn't play too poorly, Cornell lost 1–2 in overtime to bring their losing streak up to three.

With their season beginning to spiral out of control, Cornell had a huge opportunity during Thanksgiving when they took on #5 Boston University for their biannual Red Hot Hockey showdown. In front of 15,000 spectators at Madison Square Garden, Shane returned with a triumphant performance, stopping 35 shots (6 from prospective #1 overall pick Macklin Celebrini) and led the Big Red to victory. A split the following week with Colgate showed that the team still had some work to do but Cornell had stopped their slide and remained in contention for the NCAA tournament.

The team kicked off the second half of their season with an appearance at the inaugural Adirondack Winter Invitational. Cornell faced a tough task by having to get through a pair of ranked teams but the Big Red were able to carry a lead into the third period in both games. Unfortunately, their typical defensive game didn't work in either case and both games ended up needing overtime. Cornell was able to get a shootout win in the semifinal over Massachusetts but they ultimately fell to Arizona State in the championship. A couple of weeks later, Cornell got a chance for revenge when they travelled out to Tempe for a series with the Sun Devils. The first game was eerily similar to the previous meeting as Cornell built a 2-goal lead only to see ASU tie the score in the third. This time, however, Cornell came out on top thanks to Ben Robertson's first goal of the season in overtime. The Big Red were demonstrably better in the rematch and were able to control the latter half of the match after getting out to a 3–0 lead at the start of the second.

The sweep began a streak of great hockey from Cornell and the team didn't lose a single game over the next five weeks. Shane was brilliant during the stretch and didn't allow more than 2 goals in any game. The offense, too, recovered its earlier form and allowed Cornell to climb up the conference standings. The only problem for Cornell was that most of the teams they faced were not highly regarded. While a few ECAC teams held a decent position in the PairWise rankings, most of the conference was in the bottom third. This meant that, even though Cornell had gone 10–0–4 after Christmas, the team had only risen up to 11th in the rankings. Disaster then struck as Cornell stumbled in the final two weeks and a pair of losses dropped the Big Red below the cut line for the NCAA tournament.

Due to circumstances beyond their control, only the top 14 teams in the rankings had any chance to make the NCAA tournament. Even though they were eleven games over .500 with wins over several ranked teams, Cornell had little chance to receive an at-large bid. As they finished second in the ECAC, the Big Red received a bye into the quarterfinal round and, after taking a week off, found that Harvard would be their opponent. Cornell seemed unstoppable in the first half of the game and got out to a 4–0 lead. The team then seemed to believe that the match was over and allowed the Crimson to claw their way back with three goals over a 20-minute period. The final six minutes of the match were hotly contested but the Cornell defense had recovered by then and prevented the tying goal from being scored. Apparently having learned their lesson, Cornell put the clamps on Harvard even after getting an early lead and this time their hated foes could only manage a single goal. Seger and Robertson each had a pair in the game (the second two for each being empty-net goals) and the team move onto the semifinals.

Cornell got an unfavorable match in Lake Placid when they were faced with Dartmouth. The Big Red had yet to defeat the Greens that season and they were quickly reminded of that when Dartmouth scored the opening goal. Ondřej Pšenička tied the game early in the second but the Big Green responded with a pair of markers to take a 2-goal lead into the third. Cornell was not used needing 3rd-period comebacks but that got a bit of a leg up when Dartmouth took a boarding call with 5 second left in the second. Starting the final frame on the power play, Dalton Bancroft cut the lead down to 1 and from that point on it was all Cornell. Constant pressure from the offense eventually led to two goals in 50 seconds and gave the Big Red their first lead with 10 minutes to play. Dartmouth tried to regain the momentum but they could not get the puck past Shane. The Green pulled their goaltender in desperation but that only gave Nick DeSantis the opportunity to score twice into an empty net and cap off a 5-goal third period that saved the season.

Compared to the drama of the semifinal, the championship was a bit of a letdown but it was no less important for Cornell to win the game. By then the Big Red had climbed up to 13 in the PairWise, however, they found themselves facing St. Lawrence for the conference title. A loss to the Saints would drop the Big Red back down and knock them out of the national tournament so their only hope of continuing was to win the title. In spite of an inspired performance from the Larries' netminder, Jonathan Castagna scored twice to give Cornella 2–0 lead after two periods. Shane was finally beaten in the third but he only allowed one to get past him and Cornell first ECAC championship in 14 years sent the Big Red back to the NCAA tournament.

Cornell's title enabled the team to jump up to #12 in the rankings and receive a 3-seed for the tournament. They were placed opposite to a resurgent Maine squad that got off to a fast start and opened the scoring less than 6 minutes into the game. The team was then dealt a blow when Ryan Walsh was called for a 5-minute major about a minute later and Cornell seemed poised to suffer an crushing defeat. Shane, however, redoubled his efforts and with the aid of a herculean effort from the penalty killers he was able to stop the Black Bears from increasing their lead. Shortly after Walsh left the box, team captain Kyle Penney tied the game on a straight shot from the high slot. The final two periods were typified by two things: Cornell's suffocating defense and Sullivan Mack. The junior forward had the game of his life and scored in each of the final two periods. Despite a furious effort, Maine was unable to get a second goal past Shane and Cornell marched on to the regional final.

With Denver the only thing standing between the Big Red and the Frozen Four, Cornell got off to a quick start and Nick DeSantis opened the scoring less than 7 minutes into the match. The Pioneers managed to tie the score in the final minutes of the period but play remained decidedly in Cornell's favor. The nation's top offense found it difficult to crack the Big Red defense and few of the Pioneers' shots on goal were at risk of going in. With Cornell content to play their style and wit for an opportunity, Castagna made a costly mistake and was called for a penalty at the end of the second. Cornell tried to hold back the Denver attack but with just 4 seconds left, a show was tipped between Shane's legs and the Big Red found themselves trailing for the first time. The feature of the third period was Denver pulling back into a defensive shell. Though that resulted in the Pioneers only getting 3 shots on goal, they stymied Cornell's comeback attempt and stopped the Big Red from getting many chances. As the third was winding down and Mike Schafer was getting ready to pull Shane for an extra attacker, Walsh took a slashing penalty that threw their plans into chaos. Though Cornell was able to kill off the penalty, when it ended there were only 35 seconds left in the game and the Big Red were unable to make much of a final push. Instead, Denver was able to kill of the last moments of the game and knock Cornell out.

== Departures ==
Player	Position	Nationality	Cause
Maxim Andreyev	Forward	Russia	Graduation (signed with Coachella Valley Firebirds)
Ben Berard	Forward	Canada	Graduation (signed with Texas Stars)
Sebastian Dirven	Defenseman	Canada	Graduation (signed with Wheeling Nailers)
Jack Lagerstrom	Defenseman	United States	Left program (retired)
Sam Malinski	Defenseman	United States	Graduation (signed with Colorado Avalanche)
Jack Malone	Forward	United States	Graduate transfer to Boston College
Travis Mitchell	Defenseman	United States	Graduation (signed with New York Islanders)
Peter Muzyka	Defenseman	Canada	Transferred to Long Island
Matt Stienburg	Forward	Canada	Graduation (signed with Colorado Eagles)
Zach Tupker	Forward	Canada	Graduate transfer to Quinnipiac

== Recruiting ==
Player	Position	Nationality	Age	Notes
Jonathan Castagna	Forward	Canada	18	Toronto, ON; selected 70th overall in 2023
Tyler Catalano	Forward	United States	19	St. Louis, MO
Luke Devlin	Forward	Canada	19	Memphis, TN; selected 182nd overall in 2022
George Fegaras	Defenseman	Canada	19	Richmond Hill, ON; selected 83rd overall in 2022
Jake Kraft	Forward	United States	20	Rochester, NY
Marián Moško	Defenseman	Slovakia	19	Žilina, SVK
Ben Robertson	Defenseman	United States	19	Potomac Falls, VA
Hoyt Stanley	Defenseman	Canada	18	West Vancouver, BC; selected 108th overall in 2023
Liam Steele	Defenseman	England	19	Cobham, UK
Ryan Walsh	Forward	United States	20	Rochester, NY; selected 188th overall in 2023

== Roster ==
As of July 10, 2023.

No.	Nat.	Player	Class	Pos	Height	Weight	DoB	Hometown	Previous team	NHL rights
2	(England)	Liam Steele	Freshman	D	6' 4" (1.93 m)	225 lb (102 kg)	2004-04-21	Cobham, England	Salmon Arm Silverbacks (BCHL)	—
3	(Canada)	Jack O'Brien	Sophomore	D	6' 0" (1.83 m)	170 lb (77 kg)	2003-03-07	White Rock, British Columbia	Nanaimo Clippers (BCHL)	—
4	(United States)	Hank Kempf	Junior	D	6' 2" (1.88 m)	200 lb (91 kg)	2002-04-15	Wilmette, Illinois	Muskegon Lumberjacks (USHL)	NYR, 208th overall 2021
5	(Canada)	Hoyt Stanley	Freshman	D	6' 3" (1.91 m)	200 lb (91 kg)	2005-02-04	West Vancouver, British Columbia	Victoria Grizzlies (BCHL)	OTT, 108th overall 2023
6	(Canada)	George Fegaras	Freshman	D	6' 2" (1.88 m)	205 lb (93 kg)	2004-04-26	Richmond Hill, Ontario	Muskegon Lumberjacks (USHL)	DAL, 83rd overall 2022
7	(United States)	Jimmy Rayhill	Junior	D	5' 9" (1.75 m)	175 lb (79 kg)	2001-03-17	New Hartford, New York	Odessa Jackalopes (NAHL)	—
8	(Canada)	Luke Devlin	Freshman	F	6' 3" (1.91 m)	187 lb (85 kg)	2004-03-12	Toronto, Ontario	West Kelowna Warriors (BCHL)	PIT, 182nd overall 2022
9	(United States)	Jack O'Leary (A)	Junior	F	5' 7" (1.7 m)	162 lb (73 kg)	2000-03-28	St. James, New York	Lincoln Stars (USHL)	—
10	(United States)	Jacob Kraft	Freshman	F	5' 8" (1.73 m)	170 lb (77 kg)	2003-04-26	Churchville, New York	Cedar Rapids RoughRiders (USHL)	—
11	(Canada)	Sean Donaldson	Sophomore	F	5' 11" (1.8 m)	180 lb (82 kg)	2001-03-28	Vancouver, British Columbia	Nanaimo Clippers (BCHL)	—
12	(United States)	Tim Rego	Junior	D	6' 0" (1.83 m)	172 lb (78 kg)	2000-10-31	Mansfield, Massachusetts	Brooks Bandits (AJHL)	—
13	(Slovakia)	Marián Moško	Freshman	F	5' 11" (1.8 m)	185 lb (84 kg)	2004-05-11	Visolaje, Slovakia	Fargo Force (USHL)	—
14	(United States)	Ryan Walsh	Freshman	F	6' 1" (1.85 m)	180 lb (82 kg)	2003-08-25	Rochester, New York	Cedar Rapids RoughRiders (USHL)	BOS, 188th overall 2023
15	(United States)	Tyler Catalano	Freshman	F	6' 4" (1.93 m)	225 lb (102 kg)	2004-02-26	St. Louis, Missouri	Youngstown Phantoms (USHL)	—
16	(Sweden)	Gabriel Seger (A)	Senior	F	6' 4" (1.93 m)	210 lb (95 kg)	1999-11-15	Uppsala, Sweden	Union (ECAC)	—
17	(Canada)	Dalton Bancroft	Sophomore	F	6' 3" (1.91 m)	200 lb (91 kg)	2001-02-26	Madoc, Ontario	Trenton Golden Hawks (OJHL)	—
18	(Canada)	Kyler Kovich	Junior	F	6' 2" (1.88 m)	182 lb (83 kg)	2002-01-31	Coquitlam, British Columbia	Tri-City Storm (USHL)	—
19	(United States)	Sullivan Mack	Junior	F	6' 1" (1.85 m)	189 lb (86 kg)	2000-07-05	Anchorage, Alaska	Salmon Arm Silverbacks (BCHL)	—
21	(United States)	Ben Robertson	Freshman	D	5' 11" (1.8 m)	181 lb (82 kg)	2004-09-18	Potomac Falls, Virginia	Waterloo Black Hawks (USHL)	—
22	(Canada)	Kyle Penney (C)	Junior	F	6' 1" (1.85 m)	204 lb (93 kg)	2000-07-18	Lawrencetown, Nova Scotia	Chilliwack Chiefs (BCHL)	—
23	(United States)	Winter Wallace	Sophomore	F	6' 3" (1.91 m)	215 lb (98 kg)	2002-01-21	Boulder, Colorado	Youngstown (USHL)	—
26	(Czech Republic)	Ondřej Pšenička	Junior	F	6' 6" (1.98 m)	211 lb (96 kg)	2001-01-07	Prague, Czech Republic	Waterloo Black Hawks (USHL)	—
27	(United States)	Michael Suda	Junior	D	6' 1" (1.85 m)	180 lb (82 kg)	2002-07-03	Cheektowaga, New York	Fargo Force (USHL)	—
28	(United States)	Nick DeSantis	Sophomore	F	5' 9" (1.75 m)	155 lb (70 kg)	2002-05-02	Collegeville, Pennsylvania	Madison Capitols (USHL)	—
30	(United States)	Ian Shane	Junior	G	6' 0" (1.83 m)	170 lb (77 kg)	2000-09-24	Manhattan Beach, California	Bismarck Bobcats (USHL)	—
33	(United States)	Remington Keopple	Sophomore	G	6' 2" (1.88 m)	190 lb (86 kg)	2002-03-21	New Richmond, Wisconsin	Des Moines Buccaneers (USHL)	—
34	(United States)	Ryan McInchak	Senior	G	6' 0" (1.83 m)	175 lb (79 kg)	1999-02-28	Trenton, Michigan	American International (AHA)	—
38	(Canada)	Jonathan Castagna	Freshman	F	6' 2" (1.88 m)	185 lb (84 kg)	2005-04-20	Etobicoke, Ontario	St. Andrew's College (CISAA)	ARI, 70th overall 2023

== Standings ==
2023–24 ECAC Hockey Standings
	Conference record										Overall record					
	GP	W	L	T	OTW	OTL	SW	PTS	GF	GA	GP	W	L	T	GF	GA
#6 Quinnipiac †	22	17	4	1	0	2	0	54	99	39	39	27	10	2	160	79
#9 Cornell *	22	12	6	4	1	2	3	44	74	45	35	22	7	6	115	65
Colgate	22	13	7	2	2	2	2	43	85	68	36	16	16	4	120	112
Dartmouth	22	9	6	7	1	1	3	37	66	60	32	13	10	9	92	91
Clarkson	22	12	9	1	4	2	1	36	62	58	35	18	16	1	95	97
Union	22	9	10	3	1	1	2	32	75	75	37	16	18	3	123	121
St. Lawrence	22	8	10	4	1	1	1	29	49	64	39	14	19	6	90	118
Harvard	22	6	10	6	1	2	3	28	49	64	32	7	19	6	70	106
Princeton	22	8	11	3	4	0	2	25	70	90	30	10	16	4	89	114
Yale	22	7	13	2	1	2	1	25	46	57	30	10	18	2	63	91
Brown	22	6	14	2	2	3	1	22	43	69	30	8	19	3	61	98
Rensselaer	22	6	13	3	0	0	0	21	58	89	37	10	23	4	93	150
Championship: March 23, 2024 † indicates conference regular season champion (Cleary Cup) * indicates conference tournament champion (Whitelaw Cup); Rankings: USCHO.com Top 20 Poll

== Schedule and results ==
Date	Time	Opponent^{#}	Rank^{#}	Site	TV	Decision	Result	Attendance	Record
Exhibition
October 14	7:00 pm	Toronto Metropolitan*	#11	Lynah Rink • Ithaca, New York (Exhibition)	ESPN+	Shane	W 6–1	3,216	
October 21	7:00 pm	USNTDP*	#11	Lynah Rink • Ithaca, New York (Exhibition)	ESPN+	Keopple	W 5–4 ^{OT}	3,412	
Regular Season
October 27	7:00 pm	#11 Minnesota Duluth*	#12	Lynah Rink • Ithaca, New York	ESPN+	Shane	W 4–1	4,316	1–0–0
October 28	7:00 pm	#11 Minnesota Duluth*	#12	Lynah Rink • Ithaca, New York	ESPN+	Shane	W 3–0	4,316	2–0–0
November 3	7:00 pm	at Yale	#10	Ingalls Rink • New Haven, Connecticut	ESPN+	Shane	W 3–1	2,034	3–0–0 (1–0–0)
November 4	7:00 pm	at Brown	#10	Meehan Auditorium • Providence, Rhode Island	ESPN+	Shane	W 7–1	1,043	4–0–0 (2–0–0)
November 10	7:00 pm	Dartmouth	#7	Lynah Rink • Ithaca, New York	ESPN+	Shane	T 2–2 ^{SOW}	4,361	4–0–1 (2–0–1)
November 11	7:00 pm	Harvard	#7	Lynah Rink • Ithaca, New York (Rivalry)	ESPN+	Shane	L 2–3	4,361	4–1–1 (2–1–1)
November 17	7:00 pm	at #7 Quinnipiac	#10	M&T Bank Arena • Hamden, Connecticut	ESPN+	Keopple	L 4–8	2,884	4–2–1 (2–2–1)
November 18	7:00 pm	at Princeton	#10	Hobey Baker Memorial Rink • Princeton, New Jersey	ESPN+	Keopple	L 1–2 ^{OT}	2,500	4–3–1 (2–3–1)
November 25	8:00 pm	vs. #5 Boston University*	#16	Madison Square Garden • New York, New York (Red Hot Hockey)	ESPN+	Shane	W 2–1	15,289	5–3–1
December 1	7:00 pm	at Colgate	#16	Class of 1965 Arena • Hamilton, New York	ESPN+	Shane	W 4–2	2,198	6–3–1 (3–3–1)
December 2	7:00 pm	Colgate	#16	Lynah Rink • Ithaca, New York	ESPN+	Shane	L 2–4	4,316	6–4–1 (3–4–1)
Adirondack Winter Invitational
December 29	4:00 pm	vs. #11 Massachusetts*	#17	Herb Brooks Arena • Lake Placid, New York (Winter Invitational Semifinal)	ESPN+	Shane	T 2–2 ^{SOW}	4,037	6–4–2 (3–4–1)
December 30	7:30 pm	vs. #13 Arizona State*	#17	Herb Brooks Arena • Lake Placid, New York (Winter Invitational Championship)	ESPN+	Shane	T 2–2 ^{SOL}	3,846	6–4–3 (3–4–1)
January 12	9:00 pm	at #11 Arizona State*	#18	Mullett Arena • Tempe, Arizona		Shane	W 3–2 ^{OT}	5,007	7–4–3
January 13	7:00 pm	at #11 Arizona State*	#18	Mullett Arena • Tempe, Arizona		Shane	W 4–1	5,024	8–4–3
January 19	7:00 pm	Princeton	#14	Lynah Rink • Ithaca, New York	ESPN+	Shane	W 6–2	4,181	9–4–3 (4–4–1)
January 20	7:00 pm	#3 Quinnipiac	#14	Lynah Rink • Ithaca, New York	ESPN+	Shane	W 3–2 ^{OT}	4,361	10–4–3 (5–4–1)
January 26	7:00 pm	at Harvard	#13	Bright-Landry Hockey Center • Boston, Massachusetts (Rivalry)	ESPN+	Shane	W 2–0	3,095	11–4–3 (6–4–1)
January 27	7:00 pm	at Dartmouth	#13	Thompson Arena • Hanover, New Hampshire	ESPN+	Shane	T 2–2 ^{SOL}	2,296	11–4–4 (6–4–2)
February 2	7:00 pm	St. Lawrence	#13	Lynah Rink • Ithaca, New York	ESPN+	Shane	W 5–1	3,726	12–4–4 (7–4–2)
February 3	7:00 pm	Clarkson	#13	Lynah Rink • Ithaca, New York	ESPN+	Shane	W 7–2	4,092	13–4–4 (8–4–2)
February 9	7:00 pm	at Rensselaer	#13	Houston Field House • Troy, New York	ESPN+	Shane	W 4–1	2,317	14–4–4 (9–4–2)
February 10	7:00 pm	at Union	#13	Achilles Rink • Schenectady, New York	ESPN+	Shane	W 6–1	2,230	15–4–4 (10–4–2)
February 16	7:00 pm	Brown	#12	Lynah Rink • Ithaca, New York	ESPN+	Shane	W 3–0	4,267	16–4–4 (11–4–2)
February 17	7:00 pm	Yale	#12	Lynah Rink • Ithaca, New York	ESPN+	Shane	T 1–1 ^{SOW}	4,267	16–4–5 (11–4–3)
February 23	7:00 pm	at Clarkson	#11	Cheel Arena • Potsdam, New York	ESPN+	Shane	L 3–4 ^{OT}	2,652	16–5–5 (11–5–3)
February 24	7:00 pm	at St. Lawrence	#11	Appleton Arena • Canton, New York	ESPN+	Shane	T 2–2 ^{SOW}	1,579	16–5–6 (11–5–4)
March 1	7:00 pm	Union	#13	Lynah Rink • Ithaca, New York	ESPN+	Shane	L 2–3	3,855	16–6–6 (11–6–4)
March 2	7:00 pm	Rensselaer	#13	Lynah Rink • Ithaca, New York	ESPN+	Shane	W 3–1	3,723	17–6–6 (12–6–4)
ECAC Hockey Tournament
March 15	7:00 pm	Harvard*	#15	Lynah Rink • Ithaca, New York (Quarterfinal Game 1, Rivalry)	ESPN+	Shane	W 4–3	4,267	18–6–6
March 16	7:00 pm	Harvard*	#15	Lynah Rink • Ithaca, New York (Quarterfinal Game 2, Rivalry)	ESPN+	Shane	W 4–1	4,267	19–6–6
March 22	7:30 pm	vs. Dartmouth*	#14	Herb Brooks Arena • Lake Placid, New York (Semifinal)	ESPN+	Shane	W 6–3	4,015	20–6–6
March 23	5:00 pm	vs. St. Lawrence*	#14	Herb Brooks Arena • Lake Placid, New York (Championship)	ESPN+	Shane	W 3–1	4,912	21–6–6
NCAA Tournament
March 28	5:30 pm	vs. #6 Maine*	#12	MassMutual Center • Springfield, Massachusetts (Northeast Regional Semifinal)	ESPNews	Shane	W 3–1	5,765	22–6–6
March 30	4:00 pm	vs. #3 Denver*	#12	MassMutual Center • Springfield, Massachusetts (Northeast Regional Final)	ESPN2	Shane	L 1–2	4,407	22–7–6
*Non-conference game. ^{#}Rankings from USCHO.com Poll. All times are in Eastern Time. Source:

== NCAA Tournament ==
=== Regional semifinal ===
March 28, 2024; 6:59 pm	(2) Maine	1–3 (1–1, 0–1, 0–1)	(3) Cornell	MassMutual Center; Attendance: 5,765

Game reference

Victor Östman
Goalies
Ian Shane
Referees:
Colin Kronforst
Andrew Bruggeman
Linesmen:
Sam Shikowsky
Tommy George

(Villeneuve-Houle) Harrison Scott (15) – 5:43	1–0
	1–1	13:56 – Kyle Penney (10) (Seger)
	1–2	32:09 – GW – Sullivan Mack (6) (unassisted)
	1–3	50:31 – Sullivan Mack (7) (unassisted)

2 min
Penalties
5 min
32
Shots
18

Game summary
The start to the game was delayed by an hour and a half due to the other semifinal going into overtime. Once the match began, however, Maine jumped on the puck and attacked the Cornell cage. Ian Shane was able to hold off the Black Bears and The Big Red's staunch defense swiftly came to his aid. Play evened out afterwards and Cornell began to test the Maine goaltender. On a missed chance by the Big Red, the puck was quickly moved up the ice by the Bears. When the Cornell defender blew a tire, Harrison Scott was able to skate to an open spot in the slot and fire the puck over Shane's glove. A few minutes later, Ryan Walsh left his feet when he went to check Bradly Nadeau along the half wall and was given a major penalty. Maine used the time well, keeping the pressure on the Cornell net for most of the 5 minutes but they were unable to build on their lead. After killing off the penalty, Cornell got back to its game and began to pressure Maine on the forecheck. Gabriel Seger was able to steal the puck in the offensive zone and sent the rubber to an open Kyle Penney. Penney walked in a fired the shot from the high slot, beating Östman in the top corner. Maine carried the balance of play for the remainder of the period but were stymied by the Cornell defense.

Both teams were skating at the start of the second and ended up exchanging odd-man rushes. As the period wore on, Maine began to take control of the game but on one of the few established zone times for Cornell, Parker Lindauer was whistled for holding and gave the Big Red their first power play of the night. After wasting the first half of the man-advantage, Cornell got two glorious opportunities from the left side of the net but missed the cage both times. Jonathan Castagna then one-timed a laser from the right side but Östman made a brilliant save to keep the game tied. The two then spent several minutes probing for the next goal and, just past the 12-minute mark, Sullivan Mack intercepted the puck on an attempted clear, skated towards the goal and just before a Maine player got within reach, fired the puck past Östman's blocker for Cornell's first lead of the evening. The Big Red carried the momentum for several minutes afterwards but Maine eventually evened out the play. With about 2 minutes to play, George Fegaras attempted to clear the puck but sent it right to a Maine player at his own blue line. Ben Poisson fired the puck on goal and in the ensuing scramble, Sully Scholle ended up skewing Shane's arm when he went for the puck. After a stoppage to check on Shane's health, the goalie remained in the net. Cornell's defense was called upon once more at the end of the period and Maine's offense was held at bay.

Cornell got to its game as soon as the third began and did its best to strangle the Maine offense. The Big Red kept the puck in the Bears' end as much as they could, generating scoring chances when they could, but doing so primarily to prevent any shots from being directed at their own cage. Maine wasn't able to get much going until about five minutes into the period but even then Shane was equal to the task. Maine continued to attack but very few of their chances ended up getting on goal. Just after the midway point of the game, Sullivan Mack deflected the puck away from Bradly Nadeau in front of his own net and broke out on an odd-man rush. He skated towards the Maine goal and, just as the defender was passing in front him, fired i the puck into the top corner of the goal. Maine was visibly deflated afterwards and their chances at winning were starting to fade. The Black Bears were able to collect themselves and attack the Cornell cage from time to time but Cornell prevented any extended zone time. Needing 2 goals, coach Ben Barr pulled Östman with three minutes to go in the game. The extra skater gave Maine enough of an advantage to finally get some shots on goal but most were from the perimeter and low percentage. Dalton Bancroft missed an empty net with about 30 seconds to play but that didn't affect the final score and Cornell moved on to the regional final.

=== Regional final ===
March 30, 2024; 4:00 pm	(1) Denver	2–1 (1–1, 1–0, 0–0)	(3) Cornell	MassMutual Center; Attendance: 4,407

Game reference

Matt Davis
Goalies
Ian Shane
Referees:
Colin Kronforst
Andrew Bruggeman
Linesmen:
Sam Shikowsky
Tommy George

	0–1	06:44 – Nick Desantis (8) (Seger, Penney)
(Webster, Buckberger) Miko Matikka (20) – 18:31	1–1
(S. Buium, Z. Buium) Sam Harris (14) – GW PP – 39:56	2–1

2 min
Penalties
4 min
18
Shots
25

Game summary
The game began with Denver testing Cornell's defense. The Pioneers managed to cause a turnover that led to a scoring chance in the slot but Ian Shane made the stop. Cornell fought through the early difficulty and then slowly got up to speed. After establishing themselves in the offensive zone, the Big Red fired a barrage on the Denver cage. Matt Davis made several stops but was unable to freeze the puck in a scramble. When Davis tried to regain his footing, Nick DeSantis found the puck and shot it between the goaltender's legs for the first goal of the game. Cornell kept with their defensive game afterwards and prevented Denver from setting up their offense. The Pioneers were able to get several rushes up the ice and get shots on goal but they were not able to sustain any presence in Cornell's end. On one of Cornell's counter rushes up the ice, DeSantis tried to make a move around Kieran Cebrian but the Denver defenseman ended up committing an interference penalty. Half-way through the man-advantage, a Cornell defender fell down inside the offensive blueline and allowed Denver to get on a 2-on-0 break. With Cornell backchecking hard, the Jared Wright made a rushed shot in close that Shane was able to stop. Cornell's offense continued to earn chances following defensive plays and Jonathan Castagna broke in on the Denver cage. Davis made the save but, again, could not freeze the puck. A follow-up chance from a sharp angle missed a partially open cage and sailed high. With about 90 seconds to play, a turnover just inside the Cornell blueline by McKade Webster got the puck to Miko Matikka and he rifled a shot into the top corner from the top of the circle.

The second began with DeSantis getting a partial break on the Denver net but Davis was able to make the save. Denver tried to get their high-powered offense going afterwards but the Cornell defense continued their oppressive style and limit the Pioneers. The Big Red were able to use a sizable advantage in the faceoff circle to ice the puck and get out of trouble without giving Denver a subsequent scoring chance. Even when Denver was able to get a shot on goal, they were quite often one-and-done with Cornell either able to clear the puck or Shane freezing it for a faceoff. In the middle of the period, there were several circumstances where penalties could have been called on either team but the officials appeared comfortable in letting the physical play occur. It wasn't until well past the midway point of the period that either team was able to get some extended zone time and Cornell was able to cycle the puck in the Denver end. The Big Red threw the puck across the frost of the cage several times but they weren't able to get a grade-A chance on goal. Cornell continued to press in the offensive zone and was nearly able to take the lead when a shot from the point by Ben Robertson trickled past Davis and slid just past the outside of the right post. In the final few minutes of the period, Denver was finally able to get set up in the offensive zone but the Cornell defense still would not give the Pioneers a clean shot at the net. Jacob Kraft made several blocks to keep the puck away from Shane and eventually cleared the zone. With under a minute to play, Castagna hit Jack Devine late and was whistled for a minor penalty. With just seconds left in the period, Sam Harris was able to tip a Shai Buium shot between Shane's legs. The puck squeaked through the goaltender's pads and had just enough momentum to slide into the net.

With the lead for the first time, Denver looked far more relaxed at the start of the third. Cornell, however, was undeterred and kept playing their game. Denver managed to get the forecheck working and forced the Big Red into coughing up the puck multiple times. While the Pioneers got scoring chances from the mistakes, Cornell's defense was able to recover in time to stop any further scoring. At about the 12-minute mark, Cornell was able to convert a turnover into a tremendous scoring chance but Davis kept shots from both Kyle Penney and DeSantis out of the goal. As the Big Red began to switch to a more offensive style, Denver was able to get better looks on Shane. With about six minutes to play, a scrum next to the Pioneers resulted in the puck getting to an open Cornell player in the high slot. Just before he was about to shoot, the referees whistled the play dead for a hand-pass. Cornell pressed harder, looking for the tying goal and got several good looks on goal. With about three minutes to play, Castagna nearly made up for his penalty when he slapped a one-timer at an open goal but the puck just fluttered wide. Thirty seconds later, Shane was pulled for an extra attacker and David Carle called a timeout to give the Pioneers a breather. Gabriel Seger won the ensuing draw but Ryan Walsh was immediately called for a slashing minor. Cornell quickly got the puck up the ice but with Shane remaining in goal the Big Red had little chance to score on the penalty kill. at the 90-second mark, Ian Shane fumbled a clearing attempt and the puck came to Devine right in front of the net. When he went to shoot the puck it hopped and was sent wide. Cornell managed to kill of the disadvantage and tried to set up a tying goal. Seger found Walsh off to the side of the cage but his one-timer was stopped by Davis and Denver advanced to the Frozen Four.

== Scoring statistics ==
Name	Position	Games	Goals	Assists	Points	PIM
Gabriel Seger	C/LW	35	14	30	44	16
Dalton Bancroft	RW	34	12	19	31	25
Kyle Penney	C	35	10	18	28	18
Jonathan Castagna	C	35	11	14	25	25
Ben Robertson	D	35	5	18	23	2
Ryan Walsh	C	35	12	10	22	21
Ondřej Pšenička	RW	35	9	12	21	30
Sullivan Mack	F	29	7	10	17	2
Jack O'Leary	F	35	7	8	15	12
Nick DeSantis	F	35	8	6	14	30
Jake Kraft	C	34	4	9	13	2
Hoyt Stanley	D	35	2	8	10	22
Tim Rego	D	35	2	8	10	22
Luke Devlin	C	28	6	2	8	12
Hank Kempf	D	35	1	7	8	12
George Fegaras	D	33	3	4	7	12
Tyler Catalano	D/RW	24	1	4	5	14
Michael Suda	D	32	0	5	5	10
Winter Wallace	RW	24	1	1	2	12
Kyler Kovich	LW	7	0	1	1	2
Marián Moško	D	11	0	1	1	0
Remington Keopple	G	2	0	0	0	0
Jack O'Brien	D	9	0	0	0	0
Sean Donaldson	LW	10	0	0	0	0
Ian Shane	G	34	0	0	0	0
Total			115	195	310	305

== Goaltending statistics ==
Name	Games	Minutes	Wins	Losses	Ties	Goals against	Saves	Shut-outs	SV %	GAA
Ian Shane	34	2021:08	22	5	6	57	685	3	.923	1.69
Remington Keopple	2	114:33	0	2	0	7	44	0	.863	3.67
Empty Net	-	9:49	-	-	-	1	-	-	-	-
Total	35	2145:30	22	7	6	66	729	3	.918	1.82

== Rankings ==
Poll	Week																										
Poll	Pre	1	2	3	4	5	6	7	8	9	10	11	12	13	14	15	16	17	18	19	20	21	22	23	24	25	26 (Final)
USCHO.com	11	11	11	12	10 (1)	7 (2)	10	16	16	18	17	–	16	18	14	13	13	13	12	11	13	13	15	14	12	–	9
USA Hockey	14	11	8	11	10 (1)	7 (3)	10	17	16	18	17	17	–	17	15	13	13	12	12	13	15	15	15	14	11	9	9

Note: USCHO did not release a poll in weeks 11 or 25.
Note: USA Hockey did not release a poll in week 12.

== Awards and honors ==
Player	Award	Ref
Ian Shane	AHCA East Second Team All-American	
Ian Shane	Ken Dryden Award	
Gabriel Seger	ECAC Hockey Student-Athlete of the Year	
Jonathan Castagna	ECAC Hockey Most Outstanding Player in Tournament	
Ian Shane	ECAC Hockey First Team	
Gabriel Seger	ECAC Hockey First Team	
Ben Robertson	ECAC Hockey Third Team	
Ben Robertson	ECAC Hockey Rookie Team	
Jonathan Castagna	ECAC Hockey Rookie Team	
Ben Robertson	ECAC Hockey All-Tournament Team	
Jonathan Castagna	ECAC Hockey All-Tournament Team	
Gabriel Seger	ECAC Hockey All-Tournament Team	
