= Clarkson–RPI men's ice hockey rivalry =

College sports rivalry

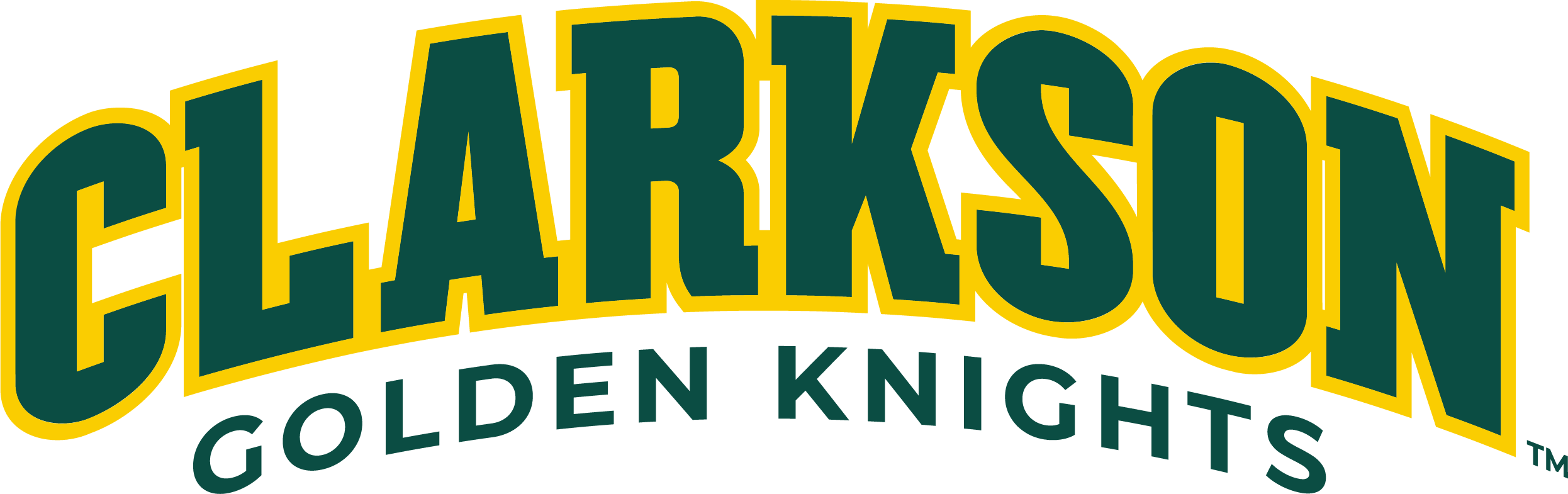
- Clarkson Golden Knights RPI Engineers
- Sport: Ice hockey
- First meeting: 24 January 1925; Rensselaer 14, Clarkson 1
- Latest meeting: 20 January 2023; Rensselaer 3, Clarkson 2
- Next meeting: TBA
- Stadiums: Cheel Arena; Houston Field House

Statistics
- Total meetings: 165
- All-time series: Clarkson, 100–54–11 (.639)
- Largest victory: Clarkson, 16–1 (5 March 1966)
- Longest win streak: Clarkson, 11 (9 December 1978 – 26 February 1983)

Locations of Clarkson and Rensselaer

The Clarkson–RPI men's ice hockey rivalry is a college ice hockey rivalry between the Clarkson Golden Knights men's ice hockey and RPI Engineers men's ice hockey programs. The first meeting between the two occurred on January 24, 1925.

== History ==
Rensselaer's ice hockey program is one of the oldest in the country, tracing its beginning back to 1902. Clarkson began its program almost 20 years later and while RPI was one of the nearest potential opponents, the two didn't meet until Clarkson's 5th season of play. Due to a combination of several circumstances, including a limited schedule for both teams and RPI suspending its program for most of the 1930s and 40s, the two did not meet again until 1951. The second match occurred the same year that both schools founded the Tri-State League, the first official conference for NCAA ice hockey. Since then, the two have remained conference rivals, with both also being founding members of ECAC Hockey in 1961. Since 1953, Clarkson and Rensselaer have played one another at least twice every season until RPI was forced to cancel its entire 20–21 season due to the COVID-19 pandemic.

== Game results ==
Full game results for the rivalry, with rankings beginning in the 1998–99 season.

Clarkson victories	Rensselaer victories	Tie games

No.	Date	Location	Winning team		Losing team		Notes
1	24 January 1925	Troy Rink; Troy, NY	Rensselaer	14	Clarkson	1	
2	13 February 1951	Houston Field House; Troy, NY	Clarkson	9	Rensselaer	2	Tri-State League play begins
3	1 March 1952	Clarkson Arena; Potsdam, NY	Rensselaer	4	Clarkson	3	
4	21 February 1953	Houston Field House; Troy, NY	Rensselaer	6	Clarkson	1	
5	27 February 1953	Clarkson Arena; Potsdam, NY	Tie	5	Tie	5	(OT)
6	6 February 1954	Houston Field House; Troy, NY	Rensselaer	8	Clarkson	0	
7	13 February 1954	Clarkson Arena; Potsdam, NY	Rensselaer	4	Clarkson	3	
8	10 December 1954	Houston Field House; Troy, NY	Clarkson	3	Rensselaer	2	
9	18 February 1955	Clarkson Arena; Potsdam, NY	Clarkson	6	Rensselaer	5	
10	11 February 1956	Clarkson Arena; Potsdam, NY	Clarkson	7	Rensselaer	1	
11	3 March 1956	Houston Field House; Troy, NY	Clarkson	6	Rensselaer	1	
12	1 December 1956	Houston Field House; Troy, NY	Rensselaer	6	Clarkson	5	(OT)
13	9 February 1957	Clarkson Arena; Potsdam, NY	Clarkson	4	Rensselaer	3	(OT)
14	31 January 1958	Houston Field House; Troy, NY	Clarkson	5	Rensselaer	1	
15	8 February 1958	Clarkson Arena; Potsdam, NY	Clarkson	4	Rensselaer	3	
16	28 February 1959	Clarkson Arena; Potsdam, NY	Rensselaer	5	Clarkson	2	
17	7 March 1959	Houston Field House; Troy, NY	Clarkson	6	Rensselaer	3	
18	5 December 1959	Houston Field House; Troy, NY	Rensselaer	4	Clarkson	3	
19	5 February 1960	Clarkson Arena; Potsdam, NY	Rensselaer	7	Clarkson	5	
20	10 February 1961	Clarkson Arena; Potsdam, NY	Rensselaer	3	Clarkson	2	
21	4 March 1961	Houston Field House; Troy, NY	Rensselaer	8	Clarkson	3	
22	9 December 1961	Houston Field House; Troy, NY	Clarkson	5	Rensselaer	3	ECAC play begins
23	17 February 1962	Clarkson Arena; Potsdam, NY	Clarkson	8	Rensselaer	0	
24	8 December 1962	Houston Field House; Troy, NY	Clarkson	7	Rensselaer	4	
25	16 February 1963	Clarkson Arena; Potsdam, NY	Clarkson	7	Rensselaer	3	
26	15 February 1964	Houston Field House; Troy, NY	Clarkson	13	Rensselaer	4	
27	29 February 1964	Clarkson Arena; Potsdam, NY	Clarkson	3	Rensselaer	2	
28	14 March 1964	Boston Garden; Boston, MA	Rensselaer	7	Clarkson	2	ECAC consolation game
29	5 December 1964	Houston Field House; Troy, NY	Clarkson	5	Rensselaer	3	
30	13 February 1965	Clarkson Arena; Potsdam, NY	Clarkson	7	Rensselaer	2	
31	11 February 1966	Clarkson Arena; Potsdam, NY	Clarkson	7	Rensselaer	3	
32	5 March 1966	Houston Field House; Troy, NY	Clarkson	16	Rensselaer	1	
33	3 December 1966	Houston Field House; Troy, NY	Clarkson	8	Rensselaer	3	
34	18 February 1967	Clarkson Arena; Potsdam, NY	Clarkson	10	Rensselaer	3	
35	9 February 1968	Clarkson Arena; Potsdam, NY	Clarkson	6	Rensselaer	1	
36	2 March 1968	Houston Field House; Troy, NY	Clarkson	4	Rensselaer	3	
37	7 December 1968	Houston Field House; Troy, NY	Clarkson	7	Rensselaer	3	
38	14 February 1969	Clarkson Arena; Potsdam, NY	Rensselaer	5	Clarkson	4	
39	13 February 1970	Clarkson Arena; Potsdam, NY	Clarkson	6	Rensselaer	3	
40	28 February 1970	Houston Field House; Troy, NY	Clarkson	6	Rensselaer	3	
41	5 December 1970	Houston Field House; Troy, NY	Tie	3	Tie	3	(OT)
42	12 February 1971	Clarkson Arena; Potsdam, NY	Clarkson	8	Rensselaer	1	
43	30 December 1971	Houston Field House; Troy, NY	Clarkson	4	Rensselaer	1	Rensselaer Holiday Tournament round robin
44	11 February 1972	Clarkson Arena; Potsdam, NY	Clarkson	5	Rensselaer	3	
45	26 February 1972	Houston Field House; Troy, NY	Rensselaer	5	Clarkson	4	Tri-State League play ends
46	24 November 1972	Clarkson Arena; Potsdam, NY	Clarkson	4	Rensselaer	2	
47	9 December 1972	Houston Field House; Troy, NY	Clarkson	4	Rensselaer	3	
48	11 February 1973	Clarkson Arena; Potsdam, NY	Clarkson	6	Rensselaer	4	
49	1 December 1973	Houston Field House; Troy, NY	Rensselaer	9	Clarkson	3	
50	8 February 1974	Clarkson Arena; Potsdam, NY	Clarkson	5	Rensselaer	1	
51	7 December 1974	Houston Field House; Troy, NY	Clarkson	7	Rensselaer	3	
52	7 February 1975	Clarkson Arena; Potsdam, NY	Rensselaer	7	Clarkson	3	
53	6 December 1975	Houston Field House; Troy, NY	Rensselaer	5	Clarkson	3	
54	6 February 1976	Walker Arena; Potsdam, NY	Tie	6	Tie	6	(OT)
55	4 December 1976	Houston Field House; Troy, NY	Clarkson	7	Rensselaer	4	
56	28 December 1976	Houston Field House; Troy, NY	Rensselaer	5	Clarkson	2	Rensselaer Holiday Tournament round robin
57	4 February 1977	Walker Arena; Potsdam, NY	Clarkson	7	Rensselaer	6	
58	25 November 1977	Walker Arena; Potsdam, NY	Clarkson	5	Rensselaer	4	
59	10 December 1977	Houston Field House; Troy, NY	Rensselaer	5	Clarkson	4	
60	3 February 1978	Walker Arena; Potsdam, NY	Rensselaer	7	Clarkson	3	
61	9 December 1978	Houston Field House; Troy, NY	Clarkson	4	Rensselaer	3	
62	10 February 1979	Walker Arena; Potsdam, NY	Clarkson	10	Rensselaer	4	
63	13 December 1979	Houston Field House; Troy, NY	Clarkson	8	Rensselaer	6	
64	8 February 1980	Walker Arena; Potsdam, NY	Clarkson	8	Rensselaer	5	
65	28 February 1981	Walker Arena; Potsdam, NY	Clarkson	4	Rensselaer	3	
66	7 March 1981	Houston Field House; Troy, NY	Clarkson	3	Rensselaer	2	(OT)
67	12 December 1981	Houston Field House; Troy, NY	Clarkson	3	Rensselaer	2	
68	26 February 1982	Walker Arena; Potsdam, NY	Clarkson	7	Rensselaer	2	
69	12 November 1982	Glens Falls Civic Center; Glens Falls, NY	Clarkson	5	Rensselaer	3	Empire Cup semifinal
70	11 December 1982	Houston Field House; Troy, NY	Clarkson	4	Rensselaer	3	
71	26 February 1983	Walker Arena; Potsdam, NY	Clarkson	9	Rensselaer	2	
72	10 December 1983	Houston Field House; Troy, NY	Rensselaer	5	Clarkson	2	
73	24 February 1984	Walker Arena; Potsdam, NY	Clarkson	3	Rensselaer	2	
74	9 March 1984	Boston Garden; Boston, MA	Rensselaer	5	Clarkson	4	ECAC semifinal
75	17 November 1984	Houston Field House; Troy, NY	Rensselaer	5	Clarkson	3	
76	1 February 1985	Walker Arena; Potsdam, NY	Rensselaer	7	Clarkson	4	
77	16 November 1985	Walker Arena; Potsdam, NY	Tie	1	Tie	1	
78	31 January 1986	Houston Field House; Troy, NY	Rensselaer	6	Clarkson	4	
79	7 March 1986	Houston Field House; Troy, NY	Clarkson	3	Rensselaer	1	ECAC quarterfinal game 1
80	8 March 1986	Houston Field House; Troy, NY	Clarkson	6	Rensselaer	4	ECAC quarterfinal game 2
81	14 November 1986	Houston Field House; Troy, NY	Rensselaer	6	Clarkson	2	
82	31 January 1987	Walker Arena; Potsdam, NY	Clarkson	2	Rensselaer	1	
83	13 November 1987	Walker Arena; Potsdam, NY	Clarkson	6	Rensselaer	5	
84	30 January 1988	Houston Field House; Troy, NY	Clarkson	6	Rensselaer	5	
85	12 November 1988	Houston Field House; Troy, NY	Tie	2	Tie	2	
86	27 January 1989	Walker Arena; Potsdam, NY	Clarkson	5	Rensselaer	2	
87	11 November 1989	Walker Arena; Potsdam, NY	Clarkson	6	Rensselaer	5	
88	26 January 1990	Houston Field House; Troy, NY	Clarkson	5	Rensselaer	3	
89	12 November 1990	Houston Field House; Troy, NY	Clarkson	5	Rensselaer	4	(OT)
90	27 January 1991	Walker Arena; Potsdam, NY	Clarkson	8	Rensselaer	5	
91	7 December 1991	Cheel Arena; Potsdam, NY	Clarkson	4	Rensselaer	3	(OT)
92	14 February 1992	Houston Field House; Troy, NY	Rensselaer	4	Clarkson	3	(OT)
93	5 December 1992	Houston Field House; Troy, NY	Rensselaer	4	Clarkson	3	
94	19 February 1993	Cheel Arena; Potsdam, NY	Clarkson	3	Rensselaer	1	
95	19 March 1993	Olympic Arena; Lake Placid, NY	Clarkson	5	St. Lawrence	3	ECAC semifinal
96	19 November 1993	Cheel Arena; Potsdam, NY	Rensselaer	5	Clarkson	4	
97	5 February 1994	Houston Field House; Troy, NY	Rensselaer	5	Clarkson	4	
98	18 March 1994	Olympic Arena; Lake Placid, NY	Rensselaer	6	Clarkson	2	ECAC semifinal
99	11 November 1994	Houston Field House; Troy, NY	Rensselaer	4	Clarkson	3	
100	4 February 1995	Cheel Arena; Potsdam, NY	Tie	2	Tie	2	(OT)
101	1 December 1995	Cheel Arena; Potsdam, NY	Clarkson	7	Rensselaer	1	
102	10 February 1996	Houston Field House; Troy, NY	Clarkson	4	Rensselaer	1	
103	22 November 1996	Houston Field House; Troy, NY	Clarkson	4	Rensselaer	0	
104	8 February 1997	Cheel Arena; Potsdam, NY	Clarkson	5	Rensselaer	1	
105	1 December 1997	Cheel Arena; Potsdam, NY	Clarkson	11	Rensselaer	0	
106	10 February 1998	Houston Field House; Troy, NY	Rensselaer	6	Clarkson	2	
107	30 January 1999	Houston Field House; Troy, NY	Clarkson	5	No. 8 Rensselaer	3	
108	12 February 1999	Cheel Arena; Potsdam, NY	Clarkson	6	Rensselaer	4	
109	13 November 1999	Cheel Arena; Potsdam, NY	No. 6 Rensselaer	3	Clarkson	2	
110	25 February 2000	Houston Field House; Troy, NY	Clarkson	4	Rensselaer	1	
111	12 January 2001	Houston Field House; Troy, NY	Clarkson	3	No. 12 Rensselaer	2	
112	10 February 2001	Cheel Arena; Potsdam, NY	No. 14 Clarkson	3	Rensselaer	1	
113	11 January 2002	Cheel Arena; Potsdam, NY	Clarkson	4	Rensselaer	1	
114	9 February 2002	Houston Field House; Troy, NY	Rensselaer	4	Clarkson	3	(OT)
115	16 March 2002	Olympic Arena; Lake Placid, NY	Rensselaer	4	Clarkson	3	ECAC consolation game
116	8 November 2002	Houston Field House; Troy, NY	Clarkson	3	Rensselaer	1	
117	1 February 2003	Cheel Arena; Potsdam, NY	Clarkson	7	Rensselaer	1	
118	7 November 2003	Cheel Arena; Potsdam, NY	Rensselaer	4	Clarkson	3	(OT)
119	7 February 2004	Houston Field House; Troy, NY	Rensselaer	4	Clarkson	2	
120	5 November 2004	Houston Field House; Troy, NY	Rensselaer	5	Clarkson	3	
121	22 January 2005	Cheel Arena; Potsdam, NY	Rensselaer	4	Clarkson	3	
122	4 November 2005	Cheel Arena; Potsdam, NY	Tie	3	Tie	3	(OT)
123	14 January 2006	Houston Field House; Troy, NY	Rensselaer	4	No. 13 Clarkson	3	
124	19 January 2007	Houston Field House; Troy, NY	No. 10 Clarkson	4	Rensselaer	1	
125	17 February 2007	Cheel Arena; Potsdam, NY	Tie	3	Tie	3	(OT)
126	25 January 2008	Cheel Arena; Potsdam, NY	No. 10 Clarkson	5	Rensselaer	2	
127	23 February 2008	Houston Field House; Troy, NY	No. 12 Clarkson	3	Rensselaer	1	
128	24 January 2009	Cheel Arena; Potsdam, NY	Clarkson	4	Rensselaer	3	(OT)
129	27 February 2009	Houston Field House; Troy, NY	Clarkson	4	Rensselaer	2	
130	13 November 2009	Cheel Arena; Potsdam, NY	Rensselaer	5	Clarkson	2	
131	6 February 2010	Houston Field House; Troy, NY	Rensselaer	2	Clarkson	1	
132	7 January 2011	Houston Field House; Troy, NY	Clarkson	3	No. 10 Rensselaer	2	(OT)
133	19 February 2011	Cheel Arena; Potsdam, NY	No. 14 Rensselaer	5	Clarkson	1	
134	4 November 2011	Cheel Arena; Potsdam, NY	Clarkson	4	Rensselaer	1	
135	6 February 2012	Houston Field House; Troy, NY	Clarkson	3	Rensselaer	2	
136	2 March 2012	Cheel Arena; Potsdam, NY	Rensselaer	5	Clarkson	1	ECAC first round game 1
137	3 March 2012	Cheel Arena; Potsdam, NY	Clarkson	4	Rensselaer	3	(OT), ECAC first round game 2
138	4 March 2012	Cheel Arena; Potsdam, NY	Rensselaer	4	Clarkson	1	ECAC first round game 3
139	9 February 2013	Cheel Arena; Potsdam, NY	Rensselaer	6	Clarkson	2	
140	1 March 2013	Houston Field House; Troy, NY	Rensselaer	5	Clarkson	0	
141	31 January 2014	Cheel Arena; Potsdam, NY	No. 15 Clarkson	3	Rensselaer	0	
142	22 February 2014	Houston Field House; Troy, NY	Tie	2	Tie	2	(OT)
143	7 February 2015	Cheel Arena; Potsdam, NY	Clarkson	5	Rensselaer	2	
144	17 February 2015	Houston Field House; Troy, NY	Tie	3	Tie	3	(OT)
145	2 March 2015	Cheel Arena; Potsdam, NY	Rensselaer	3	Clarkson	2	ECAC first round game 1
146	3 March 2015	Cheel Arena; Potsdam, NY	Clarkson	5	Rensselaer	0	ECAC first round game 2
147	4 March 2015	Cheel Arena; Potsdam, NY	Rensselaer	3	Clarkson	1	ECAC first round game 3
148	6 November 2015	Cheel Arena; Potsdam, NY	Tie	2	Tie	2	(OT)
149	6 February 2016	Houston Field House; Troy, NY	Clarkson	4	No. 14 Rensselaer	2	
150	22 November 2016	Houston Field House; Troy, NY	Clarkson	5	Rensselaer	2	
151	7 January 2017	Herb Brooks Arena; Lake Placid, NY	Clarkson	6	Rensselaer	1	
152	28 January 2017	Cheel Arena; Potsdam, NY	Rensselaer	2	Clarkson	1	
153	3 March 2017	Cheel Arena; Potsdam, NY	Clarkson	7	Rensselaer	4	ECAC first round game 1
154	4 March 2017	Cheel Arena; Potsdam, NY	Clarkson	4	Rensselaer	2	ECAC first round game 2
155	3 November 2017	Cheel Arena; Potsdam, NY	No. 13 Clarkson	6	Rensselaer	0	
156	24 November 2017	SSE Arena Belfast; Belfast, NI	No. 5 Clarkson	2	Rensselaer	0	Friendship Four semifinal
157	13 January 2018	Houston Field House; Troy, NY	No. 3 Clarkson	3	Rensselaer	0	
158	2 November 2018	Houston Field House; Troy, NY	Clarkson	6	Rensselaer	0	
159	12 January 2019	Cheel Arena; Potsdam, NY	No. 16 Clarkson	5	Rensselaer	2	
160	9 November 2019	Houston Field House; Troy, NY	No. 8 Clarkson	2	Rensselaer	1	
161	3 January 2020	Cheel Arena; Potsdam, NY	Rensselaer	3	No. 4 Clarkson	1	
162	6 November 2021	Houston Field House; Troy, NY	Rensselaer	3	Clarkson	1	
163	3 January 2022	Cheel Arena; Potsdam, NY	Clarkson	5	Rensselaer	0	
164	5 November 2022	Cheel Arena; Potsdam, NY	Clarkson	3	Rensselaer	0	
165	20 January 2023	Houston Field House; Troy, NY	Rensselaer	3	Clarkson	2	
Series: Clarkson leads 100–54–11

== Series facts ==
Statistic	Clarkson	Rensselaer
Games played	165	
Wins	100	54
Home wins	52	28
Road wins	44	22
Neutral site wins	4	4
Goals scored	706	530
Most goals scored in a game by one team	16 (5 March 1966)	14 (24 January 1925)
Most goals in a game by both teams	17 (5 March 1966 – Clarkson 16, Rensselaer 1), (15 February 1964 – Clarkson 13, Rensselaer 4)	
Fewest goals in a game by both teams	2 (16 November 1985, 24 November 2017)	
Fewest goals scored in a game by one team in a win	2 (1987, 2017, 2019)	2 (2010, 2017)
Most goals scored in a game by one team in a loss	5 (1 December 1956, 5 February 1960)	6 (4 February 1977, 13 December 1979)
Largest margin of victory	15 (5 March 1966)	13 (24 January 1925)
Longest winning streak	11 (9 December 1978 – 26 February 1983)	4 (3 times)
Longest unbeaten streak	11 (9 December 1978 – 26 February 1983)	6 (7 November 2003 – 14 January 2006)
