= 1990 ECAC Hockey men's ice hockey tournament =

1990 ECAC Men's ice hockey tournament
- Dates: February 27–March 11, 1990
- Teams: 10
- Finals site: Boston Garden; Boston, Massachusetts
- Champions: Colgate (1st title)
- Winning coach: Terry Slater (1st title)
- MVP: Craig Woodcroft (Colgate)
- ECAC Men's Ice Hockey Tournaments

The 1990 ECAC Hockey Men's Ice Hockey Tournament was the 29th tournament in league history. It was played between February 27 and March 11, 1990. Preliminary and quarterfinal games were played at home team campus sites, while the 'final four' games were played at the Boston Garden in Boston, Massachusetts. By winning the tournament, Colgate received the ECAC's automatic bid to the 1990 NCAA Division I Men's Ice Hockey Tournament.

The Quarterfinal game between Colgate and Yale scheduled for March 3 was postponed until the following day due to a Zamboni malfunction.

== Format ==
The tournament featured four rounds of play. The two teams that finish below tenth place in the standings are not eligible for tournament play. In the first round, the seventh and tenth seeds and the eighth and ninth seeds each play a single game to determine the final qualifying teams for the quarterfinals. In the quarterfinals the first seed and lower ranked qualifier, the second seed and higher ranked qualifier, the third seed and sixth seed and the fourth seed and fifth seed played a two-game series to determine the winner. In the two games no overtime was permitted and if the two teams remained tied after the two games then a 10-minute mini-game would be played where a sudden-death overtime was allowed if the scheduled time did not produce a victor. After the opening round every series becomes a single-elimination game. In the semifinals, the highest seed plays the lowest remaining seed while the two remaining teams play with the winners advancing to the championship game and the losers advancing to the third place game. The tournament champion receives an automatic bid to the 1990 NCAA Division I Men's Ice Hockey Tournament.

== Conference standings ==
Note: GP = Games played; W = Wins; L = Losses; T = Ties; PTS = Points; GF = Goals For; GA = Goals Against

1989–90 ECAC Hockey standings
	Conference							Overall					
	GP	W	L	T	PTS	GF	GA	GP	W	L	T	GF	GA
Colgate†*	22	18	3	1	37	101	62	38	31	6	1	179	119
Rensselaer	22	14	8	0	28	131	107	34	20	14	0	176	151
Cornell	22	12	7	3	27	86	69	29	16	10	3	109	92
Clarkson	22	12	7	3	27	91	77	35	21	11	3	156	116
St. Lawrence	22	12	8	2	26	87	74	32	13	15	4	113	123
Harvard	22	12	9	1	25	110	77	28	13	14	1	125	108
Princeton	22	11	10	1	23	95	91	27	12	14	1	111	116
Brown	22	8	11	3	19	78	94	29	10	16	3	105	127
Vermont	22	7	13	2	16	71	96	31	9	20	2	98	134
Yale	22	6	15	1	13	75	105	29	8	20	1	102	146
Dartmouth	22	4	14	4	12	58	98	26	4	18	4	69	124
Army	22	4	15	3	11	59	92	30	10	16	4	93	113
Championship: Colgate † indicates conference regular season champion * indicates conference tournament champion (Whitelaw Cup)

== Bracket ==
Teams are reseeded after the first two rounds

First Round; February 27
7	Princeton	1
10	Yale	5
8	Brown	7
9	Vermont	5

Quarterfinals; March 2–4
1	Colgate	10	5	—
10	Yale	3	4	—
2	Rensselaer	5	6	—
8	Brown	3	4	—
3	Cornell	6	4	—
6	Harvard	2	2	—
4	Clarkson	4	5	—
5	St. Lawrence	1	2	—

Semifinals; March 10
1	Colgate	5
4	Clarkson	3
2	Rensselaer	3
3	Cornell	2

Championship; March 11
1	Colgate	5
2	Rensselaer	4

Note: * denotes overtime period(s)

=== Preliminary round ===
==== (7) Princeton vs. (10) Yale ====
February 27	Princeton	1 – 5	Yale	Hobey Baker Memorial Rink

==== (8) Brown vs. (9) Vermont ====
February 27	Brown	7 – 5	Vermont	Meehan Auditorium

=== Quarterfinals ===
==== (1) Colgate vs. (10) Yale ====
March 2	Colgate	10 – 3	Yale	Starr Rink

March 4 (ppd)	Colgate	5 – 4	Yale	Starr Rink

Colgate won series 2–0

==== (2) Rensselaer vs. (8) Brown ====
March 2	Rensselaer	5 – 3	Brown	Houston Field House

March 3	Rensselaer	6 – 4	Brown	Houston Field House

Rensselaer won series 2–0

==== (3) Cornell vs. (6) Harvard ====
March 2	Cornell	6 – 2	Harvard	Lynah Rink

March 3	Cornell	4 – 2	Harvard	Lynah Rink

Cornell won series 2–0

==== (4) Clarkson vs. (5) St. Lawrence ====
March 2	Clarkson	4 – 1	St. Lawrence	Walker Arena

March 3	Clarkson	5 – 2	St. Lawrence	Walker Arena

Clarkson won series 2–0

=== Semifinals ===
==== (1) Colgate vs. (4) Clarkson ====
March 10	Colgate	5 – 3	Clarkson	Boston Garden

==== (2) Rensselaer vs. (3) Cornell ====
March 10	Rensselaer	3 – 2	Cornell	Boston Garden

=== Championship ===
==== (1) Colgate vs. (2) Rensselaer ====
March 11	Colgate	5 – 4	Rensselaer	Boston Garden

== Tournament awards ==
=== All-Tournament Team ===
- F Joel Gardner (Colgate)
- F Craig Woodcroft* (Colgate)
- F Tony Hejna (Rensselaer)
- D Dave Tretowicz (Clarkson)
- D Dan Ratushny (Cornell)
- D Stephane Robitaille (Rensselaer)
- G Dave Gagnon (Colgate)

* Most Outstanding Player(s)
