= Walker Center (Clarkson University) =

Sports facility in Potsdam, New York

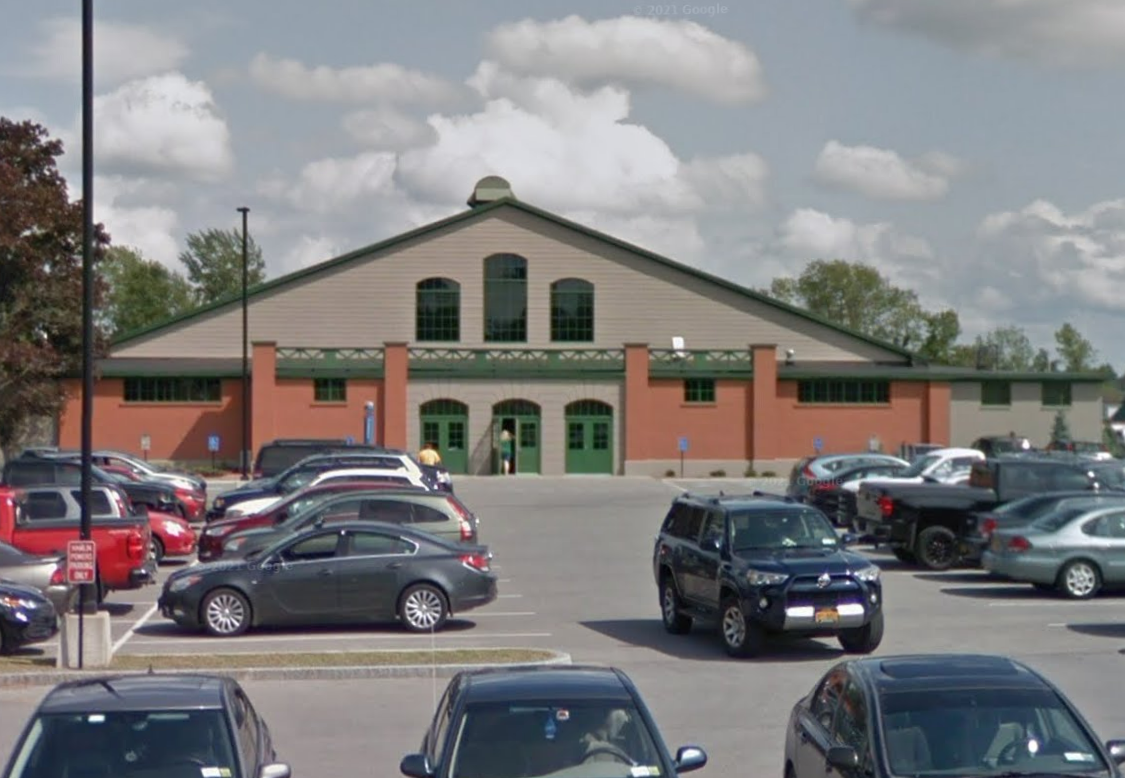
- Interactive map of Walker Center
- Former names: Clarkson Arena (1938-1975); Walker Arena (1975-1991)
- Location: Clarkson Ave. Potsdam, New York 13676
- Coordinates: 44°39′57″N 74°59′33″W
- Owner: Clarkson University
- Operator: Clarkson University
- Capacity: 1,800
- Surface: synthetic

Construction
- Groundbreaking: 1937
- Opened: 1938 (87–88 years ago)
- Closed: 1991 (Hockey)

Tenant
- Clarkson Golden Knights ice hockey (1938-1991)

The Walker Center (formerly the Clarkson Arena and Walker Arena) is an indoor multipurpose facility located in Potsdam, New York. It was the home of the Clarkson varsity ice hockey team from 1938 to 1991. It is currently used by Clarkson University for a variety of purposes after a $1 million renovation in 2008.

== History ==
Ice hockey began at Clarkson in 1921 when Murray Walker organized an ice hockey club for the college. The team became popular and successful enough that the program was formally established in 1935 and an indoor rink was needed to replace the outdoor surface at Ives Park. The Clarkson Arena was completed in 1938 and played home to the ice hockey program for the next 53 years. The building was renovated multiple times, first in 1952 when artificial ice was installed then again in 1971 when heating and additional seats were added.

In 1975 the building was renamed the Murray G. Walker Hockey Arena (known as the Walker Arena) in honor of the father of Clarkson ice hockey. By the late 1980s the building was beginning to show its age and plans for its replacement soon came to pass. The Walker Arena was sent out on a high note, however, as the 1990–91 men's team won its first conference tournament in 25 years with their two quarterfinal wins being the last games played at the Arena.

After the hockey team transferred to the Cheel Arena The building was renamed the 'Walker Center' and remained mostly disused until a major renovation turned it into a multipurpose facility with a synthetic turf used by the soccer, lacrosse and other field programs.
