= Cheel Arena =

College sports arena in Potsdam, New York, U.S.

Helen S. Cheel Arena
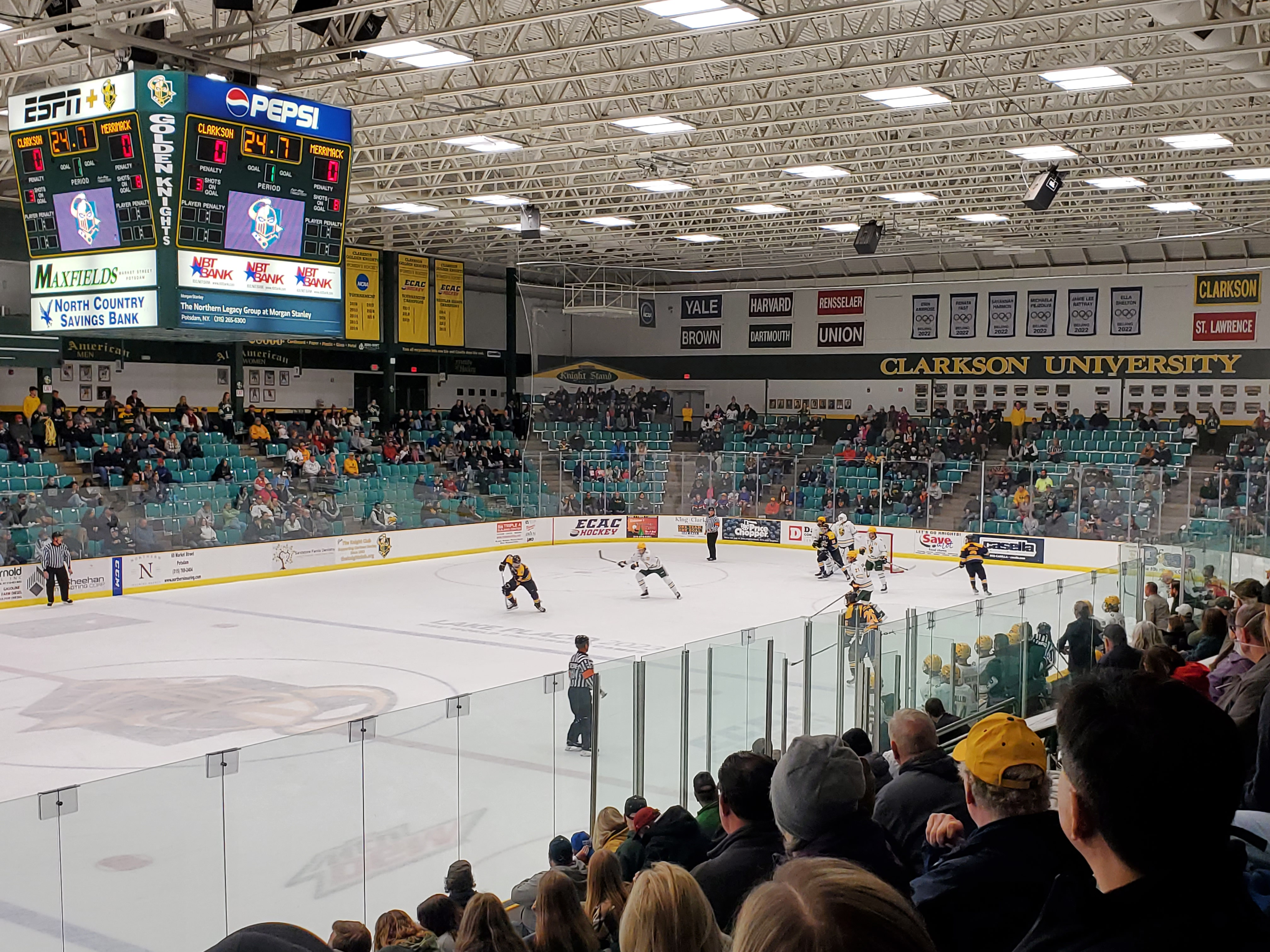
- Interactive map of Helen S. Cheel Arena
- Location: Clarkson University; 8 Clarkson Avenue; Potsdam, New York 13699
- Coordinates: 44.663836°N 75.001946°W
- Owner: St Lawrence County Industrial Development Agency
- Operator: Clarkson University
- Capacity: 4,200
- Surface: Ice

Construction
- Groundbreaking: June 15, 1990
- Opened: October 26, 1991
- Renovated: July 14, 2018 - November 2021
- Architects: Daniel F. Tully Associates, Boston

Tenants
- Clarkson Golden Knights (men's and women's ice hockey)

Cheel Arena is a 3,000-seat multi-purpose arena in Potsdam, New York, at Clarkson University. Cheel Arena was opened on October 26, 1991, and is named after Helen Snell Cheel, a long-time benefactor of Clarkson University, who provided a major gift towards the project.

It is home to the Clarkson University Golden Knights Men's and Women's hockey programs, which play at the NCAA Division I level. Ice is maintained throughout a large portion of the year for campus and community usage ranging from intramural hockey and broomball, Section X High School Championships, and figure skating. When the ice is removed, the facility is used for Clarkson's graduation and other local events. Cheel Arena typically hosts a concert every April featuring several music and comedy acts, presented by Clarkson Union Board.

The attendance record of 4,125 was set on January 18, 2003, against arch-rival St. Lawrence University, although many consider it to be unofficial due to the large number of empty seats at the game. The previous record was 4,115 set against the same team the previous year.

Students are admitted to most regular season hockey games free of charge. In a nod to the school's engineering heritage, a steam whistle is blown to mark Tech goals.

The arena is located within Cheel Campus Center which was the former student center for Clarkson. The center contains eateries, administrative offices, and Club 99. It replaced Walker Arena, the 1,800 seat home of Clarkson since 1938.

== Renovation ==
In June 2018, Clarkson revealed the new renovation and expansion project on the arena. The project would add more than 30,000 square feet to the structure and the project would be completed in different phases. The expansion to the front of the building would feature a new fitness facility & the upper level would feature the Student Professional Development Center, focused on hands-on construction engineering management. The project was set to be completed by April 1, 2020, but due to the COVID-19 pandemic, the project wasn't completed until September 2020. The project broke ground on July 14, 2018, and progress was visible by December 2018. Inside the arena, a new floor, boards, glass, & ice making systems were installed to enhance the ice playing surface.

== 2023 FISU World University Games ==
On March 5, 2018, International University Sports Federation or FISU announced that Lake Placid, New York, has won the bid on hosting the 2023 Winter World University Games. It was not the first time Lake Placid had hosted the World University Games, as they hosted in 1972 as well. At the time of the reveal, the games were projected to cost $83 million. The dates for the games were set to be January 12–22, 2023. Cheel was selected to be a host for the hockey games, as well as take care of the hockey athletes. In 2022, it was announced that the Team USA men's hockey team would play all of their qualifying games at Cheel. The first game, including the first international game at Cheel, took place on January 11, 2023, when Team Slovakia defeated Team Hungary by a score of 4–0.
