= 2023–24 ECAC Hockey men's season =

- Season: 2023–24
- Conference: ECAC Hockey
- Division: Division I
- Sport: men's ice hockey
- Duration: October 7, 2023– March 31, 2024
- Number of teams: 12
- TV partner(s): ESPN+

NHL Entry Draft

Regular Season
- Season champions: Quinnipiac
- Season MVP: Collin Graf
- Top scorer: Collin Graf

ECAC Hockey tournament
- Tournament champions: Cornell
- Runners-up: St. Lawrence
- Tournament MVP: Jonathan Castagna
- Top scorer: Gabriel Seger

NCAA tournament
- Bids: 2
- Record: 2–2
- Best Finish: Regional Final
- Team(s): Cornell; Quinnipiac

The 2023–24 ECAC Hockey men's season was the 63rd season of play for ECAC Hockey and will take place during the 2023–24 NCAA Division I men's ice hockey season. The season began on October 7, 2023, and concluded on March 31, 2024 with Quinnipiac losing in the East Regional Final of the NCAA tournament.

== Coaches ==
Colgate hired Mike Harder to replace Don Vaughan who had retired after 30 years as the team's head coach.

=== Records ===
Team	Head coach	Season at school	Record at school	ECAC Hockey record
Brown	Brendan Whittet	14	123–242–53	79–165–42
Clarkson	Casey Jones	13	216–169–55	112–87–34
Colgate	Mike Harder	1	0–0–0	0–0–0
Cornell	Mike Schafer	28	520–282–105	325–168–79
Dartmouth	Reid Cashman	3	12–46–4	9–32–3
Harvard	Ted Donato	19	298–240–66	199–153–55
Princeton	Ron Fogarty	9	80–153–23	48–101–17
Quinnipiac	Rand Pecknold	29	615–337–103	220–121–51
Rensselaer	Dave Smith	6	65–108–13	43–62–5
St. Lawrence	Brent Brekke	5	38–73–15	25–46–10
Union	Josh Hauge	2	14–19–2	8–13–1
Yale	Keith Allain	17	266–215–49	180–149–31

== Standings ==
2023–24 ECAC Hockey Standings
	Conference record										Overall record					
	GP	W	L	T	OTW	OTL	SW	PTS	GF	GA	GP	W	L	T	GF	GA
#6 Quinnipiac †	22	17	4	1	0	2	0	54	99	39	39	27	10	2	160	79
#9 Cornell *	22	12	6	4	1	2	3	44	74	45	35	22	7	6	115	65
Colgate	22	13	7	2	2	2	2	43	85	68	36	16	16	4	120	112
Dartmouth	22	9	6	7	1	1	3	37	66	60	32	13	10	9	92	91
Clarkson	22	12	9	1	4	2	1	36	62	58	35	18	16	1	95	97
Union	22	9	10	3	1	1	2	32	75	75	37	16	18	3	123	121
St. Lawrence	22	8	10	4	1	1	1	29	49	64	39	14	19	6	90	118
Harvard	22	6	10	6	1	2	3	28	49	64	32	7	19	6	70	106
Princeton	22	8	11	3	4	0	2	25	70	90	30	10	16	4	89	114
Yale	22	7	13	2	1	2	1	25	46	57	30	10	18	2	63	91
Brown	22	6	14	2	2	3	1	22	43	69	30	8	19	3	61	98
Rensselaer	22	6	13	3	0	0	0	21	58	89	37	10	23	4	93	150
Championship: March 23, 2024 † indicates conference regular season champion (Cleary Cup) * indicates conference tournament champion (Whitelaw Cup); Rankings: USCHO.com Top 20 Poll

== Non-Conference record ==
ECAC suffered in the rankings for two primary reasons; their poor non-conference record and the strength of their non-conference opponents. Only two of the twelve conference members (Cornell and Quinnipiac) ended up with winning records against other conferences. With other teams had marks close to .500, several members were far below even on the season. Harvard had a particularly bad campaign, losing all seven games out of conference. Because several of the wins that ECAC teams earned came against low-ranked opponents, they did not provide as much benefit to the conference as a whole. The end result was that, despite being undefeated in non-conference play and finishing with a record around .700, Cornell was still unable to ensure an at-large bid to the NCAA tournament.

=== Regular season record ===
Team	Atlantic Hockey	Big Ten	CCHA	Hockey East	Independent	NCHC	Total
Brown	0–1–0	0–0–0	0–0–0	0–3–0	2–0–1	0–0–0	2–4–1
Clarkson	1–1–0	1–2–0	1–1–0	2–1–0	1–1–0	0–0–0	6–6–0
Colgate	3–1–0	0–0–0	0–0–0	0–4–2	0–2–0	0–0–0	3–7–2
Cornell	0–0–0	0–0–0	0–0–0	1–0–1	2–0–1	2–0–0	5–0–2
Dartmouth	0–0–0	0–0–0	1–0–0	1–3–0	0–0–2	0–0–0	2–3–2
Harvard	0–0–0	0–0–0	0–0–0	0–6–0	0–1–0	0–0–0	0–7–0
Princeton	2–0–1	0–2–0	0–0–0	0–2–0	0–0–0	0–0–0	2–4–1
Quinnipiac	3–0–0	0–0–0	0–0–0	3–4–1	1–0–0	0–0–0	7–4–1
Rensselaer	2–0–0	0–0–0	1–1–0	0–6–1	0–0–0	0–0–0	3–7–1
St. Lawrence	1–1–1	0–1–0	1–2–1	0–2–0	0–0–0	0–2–0	2–8–2
Union	1–1–0	0–0–0	0–0–0	2–3–0	2–0–0	0–2–0	5–6–0
Yale	1–0–0	0–0–0	0–0–0	1–1–0	1–1–0	0–2–0	3–4–0
Overall	14–5–2	1–5–0	4–4–1	10–35–5	9–5–4	2–6–0	40–60–12

== Statistics ==
=== Leading scorers ===
GP = Games played; G = Goals; A = Assists; Pts = Points; PIM = Penalty minutes

Player	Class	Team	GP	G	A	Pts	PIM
Collin Graf	Junior	Quinnipiac	20	14	19	33	2
Luke Haymes	Freshman	Dartmouth	22	16	15	31	8
Jacob Quillan	Junior	Quinnipiac	22	10	20	30	10
Gabriel Seger	Senior	Cornell	22	9	17	26	6
Sam Lipkin	Sophomore	Quinnipiac	22	9	15	24	16
John Prokop	Sophomore	Union	21	6	18	24	23
Daniel Panetta	Sophomore	Colgate	22	11	12	23	4
Nick Seitz	Senior	Princeton	22	4	18	23	12
Mason Marcellus	Freshman	Quinnipiac	22	9	12	21	12
Ross Mitton	Senior	Colgate	22	8	13	21	10
Liam Robertson	Senior	Union	20	10	11	21	18
Adam Robbins	Senior	Princeton	22	9	12	21	6

=== Leading goaltenders ===
Minimum 1/3 of team's minutes played in conference games.
GP = Games played; Min = Minutes played; W = Wins; L = Losses; T = Ties; GA = Goals against; SO = Shutouts; SV% = Save percentage; GAA = Goals against average

Player	Class	Team	GP	Min	W	L	T	GA	SO	SV%	GAA
Ian Shane	Junior	Cornell	21	1229:52	12	4	4	37	2	.914	1.81
Vinny Duplessis	Senior	Quinnipiac	16	951:02	13	2	1	29	3	.915	1.83
Jack Stark	Freshman	Yale	16	906:56	6	7	2	29	2	.928	1.92
Aku Koskenvuo	Sophomore	Harvard	12	705:28	5	2	4	26	2	.931	2.21
Austin Roden	Graduate	Clarkson	15	841:38	8	5	1	32	1	.908	2.28

== ECAC tournament ==
Teams are reseeded for the semifinals

First Round; March 8–9
5	Clarkson	2
12	Rensselaer	3
6	Union	6
11	Brown	0
7	St. Lawrence	4
10	Yale	2
8	Harvard	1
9	Princeton	0

Quarterfinals; March 15–17
1	Quinnipiac	5	5	-
12	Rensselaer	1	2	-
2	Cornell	4	4	-
8	Harvard	3	1	-
3	Colgate	2	2	-
7	St. Lawrence	3**	3	-
4	Dartmouth	3	4	-
6	Union	1	2	-

Semifinals; March 22
1	Quinnipiac	0
7	St. Lawrence	3
2	Cornell	6
4	Dartmouth	3

Championship; March 23
7	St. Lawrence	1
2	Cornell	3

Note: * denotes overtime period(s)

== NCAA tournament ==
=== East Regional ===
==== Regional semifinal ====
March 29, 2024; 5:30 pm	(2) Wisconsin	2–3 (OT) (0–1, 2–1, 0–0, 0–1)	(3) Quinnipiac	Amica Mutual Pavilion; Attendance: 6,988

Game reference

Kyle McClellan
Goalies
Vinny Duplessis
Referees:
Brandon Schmitt
Nicholas Krebsbach
Linesmen:
Dana Penkivech
Jeff Schultz

	0–1	2:12 – Christophe Fillion (11) (Tellier, Tupker)
(unassisted) Quinn Finley (10) – 21:46	1–1
(Dexheimer, Mehlenbacher) Joe Palodichuk (3) – 23:01	2–1
	2–2	38:28 – Victor Czerneckianair (6) (Tupker, Cipollone)
	2–3	71:04 – GW – Victor Czerneckianair (7) (Treloar, Pennington)

8 min
Penalties
2 min
20
Shots
32

Game summary

==== Regional final ====
March 31, 2024; 4:00 pm	(1) Boston College	5–4 (OT) (0–0, 3–3, 1–1, 1–0)	(3) Quinnipiac	Amica Mutual Pavilion; Attendance: 5,835

Game reference

Jacob Fowler
Goalies
Vinny Duplessis
Referees:
Brandon Schmitt
Nicholas Krebsbach
Linesmen:
Dana Penkivech
Jeff Schultz

	0–1	21:19 – PP – Jacob Quillan (16) (Treloar, Lee)
	0–2	21:54 – Iivari Räsänen (4) (unassisted)
(Gauthier, Powell) Ryan Leonard (30) – PP – 22:20	1–2
(Jellvik, Gustafsson) Andre Gasseau (12) – 31:35	2–2
	2–3	35:59 – Christophe Fillion (12) (Legault, Räsänen)
(Smith, Powell) Ryan Leonard (31) – 37:55	3–3
	3–4	40:18 – PP – Jacob Quillan (17) (Graf, Legault)
(Gauthier, Jellvik) Aram Minnetian (3) – 55:16	4–4
(unassisted) Jack Malone (12) – GW – 63:06	5–4

8 min
Penalties
10 min
32
Shots
30

Game summary
Both teams started the game quickly, alternating rushes up the ice. The first good scoring chance went to BC's Ryan Leonard who skated through the Bobcat defense and got the puck behind Vinny Duplessis after following up his rebound. Fortunately for Quinnipiac, their defense was first on the loose puck and cleared it out of the zone. Neither team was particularly sound with the puck with both committing turnovers. The Eagles began to get the offense going in the middle part of the first but Quinnipiac's defense was quick to respond. During one of the counter rushes towards the BC net, Gabe Perreault hooked an otherwise wide-open Christophe Fillion and gave the bobcats the first power play of the game. Quinnipiac set up in the Boston College zone and fired a barrage of shots on goal. Jacob Fowler and the defense managed to turn aside several good shots and melt down a handful of other potential chances. Aram Minnetian got control of the puck right when Perreault was coming out of the box and got the winger on a breakaway. Perreault ended up getting three shots on goal from right in front of the next but Duplessis stood strong and stopped the all. During the play that followed, Zach Tupker was called for a minor penalty in front of the BC net to give the Eagles a chance with the man-advantage. Within 30 seconds, Cutter Gauthier was set up with a glorious redirect in front but Duplessis made a highlight-reel save with his left pad. Boston College continued to press and got a few more good chances until Jack Malone knocked a rebound into the net. The referee immediately waved off the goal for being hit with a high stick and the call stood after a review. The Eagles kept their foot on the gas and put a great deal of pressure on the Bobcat defense and ended up forcing C. J. McGee into a hooking penalty. The nation's #2 power play had trouble getting set up in the Quinnipiac zone thanks to solid checking. Near the end of the power play and period, Will Smith cross-checked Victor Czerneckianair and was handed a minor penalty.

Quinnipiac got set up on their power play as soon as play resumed and they remained in the BC end for well over a minute. Just before the end of the man-advantage, a tip from Jacob Quillan found its way between Fowler's legs for the opening goal. Just 35 second later, a shot from Iivari Räsänen along the high wall got past a screened Fowler and Quinnipiac suddenly had a 2-goal lead. On the ensuing play, Czerneckianair was whistled for high-sticking and it took just 8 seconds for Gauthier to set up Leonard for the Eagles' first goal. Even with the BC power play, the first half of the second was largely played in the BC end but, as time wore on, the Eagles began to get to their offensive game. Just before the mid-way point of the match, Jayden Lee took a slashing penalty and gave Boston College yet another chance on the power play. The Bobcats kept BC to the outside and managed to stave off a repeat but just after Lee had exited the box, Andre Gasseau fired the puck from the top of the left circle past a partially screened Duplessis to tie the game. A few minutes later, during a broken play in the Bobcats' end, BC flubbed a scoring chance and Smith committed a hooking penalty as Quinnipiac started back up the ice. Quinnipiac found it far tougher to set up in the offensive zone on their second man-advantage and the Boston College kept the game tied. Immediately after the end of the power play, BC tried to find Smith for a breakaway but they were called for icing. On the ensuing faceoff, Fillion was able to find a loose puck right in front of the goal, kick it to his stick and fire it past Fowler in one motion. A few minutes later, as BC was moving the puck up the ice, Collin Graf was given a minor for interference on a fairly controversial play. It took a minute for Leonard to get the puck behind the Bobcat cage and wrap it around for his second goal of the game. Just seconds later, Drew Fortescue was given a questionable penalty on what was considered a makeup call by the broadcast analyst. Quinnipiac get set up in the offensive zone and remained their most of the power play but they could not find any clear lanes to the net and didn't get a shot on goal for almost a minute. BC was able to hold on and make it to the buzzer without allowing a further goal.

With just 18 second left in their man-advantage, Quinnipiac quickly got into the BC zone and got the puck to Graf at the right point. He fired a shot that missed the net but bounced out the other side right to Quillan, who fired it from a very sharp angle into the net. The Eagles tried to get back to their game afterwards but several possessions were cancelled out by turnovers or solid defensive play from the Bobcats. After a few minutes, Boston College settled down and began applying pressure on Duplessis. On a counterattack at the 5-minute mark, Fowler made a save but the puck bounced to Fillion, who had a half-open net. He hesitated for a half-second before shooting but in that time the puck rolled off of the toe of his stick and the shot went wide. Quinnipiac took over after the near-miss and combination of speed and physical play to not only prevent the Eagles from getting a good shot on Duplessis but also generate further chances for themselves. Rather than slow the game down, Quinnipiac kept their pace high and force Boston College to try and get through a tight-checking defense without time to think. Seemingly, the best BC was able to do was get a single shot on goal before the Bobcats closed ranks and either cleared the zone or got a stop from their goalie. Quinnipiac's suffocating defense allowed just 3 shots to the Eagles through 14 minutes and even when the Bobcats made a mistake with the puck, fortune had the puck slide away from an Eagle player, or hop over a stick. With under 5 minutes to play, Boston College finally managed to do something with a turnover and Aram Minnetian tied the game with a laser from the high slot. A few minutes later, the BC faithful were up in arms when a trip on Smith went uncalled and Quinnipiac got back to their offensive game. The game sped up even more in the final few minutes but the choppy ice seemed to interfere with several rushes. BC made a furious charge at the end but time ran out before the winning goal could be scored.

At the start of overtime, Boston College had trouble getting out of their own zone. Turnovers, forechecking and icings hemmed the Eagles in their defensive zone for most of the first two minutes and forced Greg Brown to call a timeout to give his team a breather. The Eagles were finally able to break through the Bobcats' defense at around the 4-minute mark and a shot from the point was tipped in on Duplessis. The goaltender lost his balance and was unable to freeze the puck. Cristophe Tellier tried to clear the puck but it went right to the stick of Jack Malone who fired it between the legs of McGee for the winning goal.

=== Northeast Regional ===
==== Regional semifinal ====
March 28, 2024; 6:59 pm	(2) Maine	1–3 (1–1, 0–1, 0–1)	(3) Cornell	MassMutual Center; Attendance: 5,765

Game reference

Victor Östman
Goalies
Ian Shane
Referees:
Colin Kronforst
Andrew Bruggeman
Linesmen:
Sam Shikowsky
Tommy George

(Villeneuve-Houle) Harrison Scott (15) – 5:43	1–0
	1–1	13:56 – Kyle Penney (10) (Seger)
	1–2	32:09 – GW – Sullivan Mack (6) (unassisted)
	1–3	50:31 – Sullivan Mack (7) (unassisted)

2 min
Penalties
5 min
32
Shots
18

Game summary
The start to the game was delayed by an hour and a half due to the other semifinal going into overtime. Once the match began, however, Maine jumped on the puck and attacked the Cornell cage. Ian Shane was able to hold off the Black Bears and The Big Red's staunch defense swiftly came to his aid. Play evened out afterwards and Cornell began to test the Maine goaltender. On a missed chance by the Big Red, the puck was quickly moved up the ice by the Bears. When the Cornell defender blew a tire, Harrison Scott was able to skate to an open spot in the slot and fire the puck over Shane's glove. A few minutes later, Ryan Walsh left his feet when he went to check Bradly Nadeau along the half wall and was given a major penalty. Maine used the time well, keeping the pressure on the Cornell net for most of the 5 minutes but they were unable to build on their lead. After killing off the penalty, Cornell got back to its game and began to pressure Maine on the forecheck. Gabriel Seger was able to steal the puck in the offensive zone and sent the rubber to an open Kyle Penney. Penney walked in a fired the shot from the high slot, beating Östman in the top corner. Maine carried the balance of play for the remainder of the period but were stymied by the Cornell defense.

Both teams were skating at the start of the second and ended up exchanging odd-man rushes. As the period wore on, Maine began to take control of the game but on one of the few established zone times for Cornell, Parker Lindauer was whistled for holding and gave the Big Red their first power play of the night. After wasting the first half of the man-advantage, Cornell got two glorious opportunities from the left side of the net but missed the cage both times. Jonathan Castagna then one-timed a laser from the right side but Östman made a brilliant save to keep the game tied. The two then spent several minutes probing for the next goal and, just past the 12-minute mark, Sullivan Mack intercepted the puck on an attempted clear, skated towards the goal and just before a Maine player got within reach, fired the puck past Östman's blocker for Cornell's first least of the evening. The Big Red carried the momentum for several minutes afterwards but Maine eventually evened out the play. With about 2 minutes to play, George Fegaras attempted to clear the puck but sent it right to a Maine player at his own blue line. Ben Poisson fired the puck on goal and in the ensuing scramble, Sully Scholle ended up skewing Shane's arm when he went for the puck. After a stoppage to check on Shane's health, the goalie remained in the net. Cornell's defense was called upon once more at the end of the period and Maine's offense was held at bay.

Cornell got to its game as soon as the third began and did its best to strangle the Maine offense. The Big Red kept the puck in the Bears' end as much as they could, generating scoring chances when they could, but doing so primarily to prevent any shots from being directed at their own cage. Maine wasn't able to get much going until about five minutes into the period but even then Shane was equal to the task. Maine continued to attack but very few of their chances ended up getting on goal. Just after the midway point of the game, Sullivan Mack deflected the puck away from Bradly Nadeau in front of his own net and broke out on an odd-man rush. He skated towards the Maine goal and, just as the defender was passing in front him, fired i the puck into the top corner of the goal. Maine was visibly deflated afterwards and their chances at winning were starting to fade. The Black Bears were able to collect themselves and attack the Cornell cage from time to time but Cornell prevented any extended zone time. Needing 2 goals, coach Ben Barr pulled Östman with three minutes to go in the game. The extra skater gave Maine enough of an advantage to finally get some shots on goal but most were from the perimeter and low percentage. Dalton Bancroft missed an empty net with about 30 seconds to play but that didn't affect the final score and Cornell moved on to the regional final.

==== Regional final ====
March 30, 2024; 4:00 pm	(1) Denver	2–1 (1–1, 1–0, 0–0)	(3) Cornell	MassMutual Center; Attendance: 4,407

Game reference

Matt Davis
Goalies
Ian Shane
Referees:
Colin Kronforst
Andrew Bruggeman
Linesmen:
Sam Shikowsky
Tommy George

	0–1	06:44 – Nick Desantis (8) (Seger, Penney)
(Webster, Buckberger) Miko Matikka (20) – 18:31	1–1
(S. Buium, Z. Buium) Sam Harris (14) – GW PP – 39:56	2–1

2 min
Penalties
4 min
18
Shots
25

Game summary
The game began with Denver testing Cornell's defense. The Pioneers managed to cause a turnover that led to a scoring chance in the slot but Ian Shane made the stop. Cornell fought through the early difficulty and then slowly got up to speed. After establishing themselves in the offensive zone, the Big Red fired a barrage on the Denver cage. Matt Davis made several stops but was unable to freeze the puck in a scramble. When Davis tried to regain his footing, Nick DeSantis found the puck and shot it between the goaltender's legs for the first goal of the game. Cornell kept with their defensive game afterwards and prevented Denver from setting up their offense. The Pioneers were able to get several rushes up the ice and get shots on goal but they were not able to sustain any presence in Cornell's end. On one of Cornell's counter rushes up the ice, DeSantis tried to make a move around Kieran Cebrian but the Denver defenseman ended up committing an interference penalty. Half-way through the man-advantage, a Cornell defender fell down inside the offensive blueline and allowed Denver to get on a 2-on-0 break. With Cornell backchecking hard, the Jared Wright made a rushed shot in close that Shane was able to stop. Cornell's offense continued to earn chances following defensive plays and Jonathan Castagna broke in on the Denver cage. Davis made the save but, again, could not freeze the puck. A follow-up chance from a sharp angle missed a partially open cage and sailed high. With about 90 seconds to play, a turnover just inside the Cornell blueline by McKade Webster got the puck to Miko Matikka and he rifled a shot into the top corner from the top of the circle.

The second began with DeSantis getting a partial break on the Denver net but Davis was able to make the save. Denver tried to get their high-powered offense going afterwards but the Cornell defense continued their oppressive style and limit the Pioneers. The Big Red were able to use a sizable advantage in the faceoff circle to ice the puck and get out of trouble without giving Denver a subsequent scoring chance. Even when Denver was able to get a shot on goal, they were quite often one-and-done with Cornell either able to clear the puck or Shane freezing it for a faceoff. In the middle of the period, there were several circumstances where penalties could have been called on either team but the officials appeared comfortable in letting the physical play occur. It wasn't until well past the midway point of the period that either team was able to get some extended zone time and Cornell was able to cycle the puck in the Denver end. The Big Red threw the puck across the frost of the cage several times but they weren't able to get a grade-A chance on goal. Cornell continued to press in the offensive zone and was nearly able to take the lead when a shot from the point by Ben Robertson trickled past Davis and slid just past the outside of the right post. In the final few minutes of the period, Denver was finally able to get set up in the offensive zone but the Cornell defense still would not give the Pioneers a clean shot at the net. Jacob Kraft made several blocks to keep the puck away from Shane and eventually cleared the zone. With under a minute to play, Castagna hit Jack Devine late and was whistled for a minor penalty. With just seconds left in the period, Sam Harris was able to tip a Shai Buium shot between Shane's legs. The puck squeaked through the goaltender's pads and had just enough momentum to slide into the net.

With the lead for the first time, Denver looked far more relaxed at the start of the third. Cornell, however, was undeterred and kept playing their game. Denver managed to get the forecheck working and forced the Big Red into coughing up the puck multiple times. While the Pioneers got scoring chances from the mistakes, Cornell's defense was able to recover in time to stop any further scoring. At about the 12-minute mark, Cornell was able to convert a turnover into a tremendous scoring chance but Davis kept shots from both Kyle Penney and DeSantis out of the goal. As the Big Red began to switch to a more offensive style, Denver was able to get better looks on Shane. With about six minutes to play, a scrum next to the Pioneers resulted in the puck getting to an open Cornell player in the high slot. Just before he was about to shoot, the referees whistled the play dead for a hand-pass. Cornell pressed harder, looking for the tying goal and got several good looks on goal. With about three minutes to play, Castagna nearly made up for his penalty when he slapped a one-timer at an open goal but the puck just fluttered wide. Thirty seconds later, Shane was pulled for an extra attacker and David Carle called a timeout to give the Pioneers a breather. Gabriel Seger won the ensuing draw but Ryan Walsh was immediately called for a slashing minor. Cornell quickly got the puck up the ice but with Shane remaining in goal the Big Red had little chance to score on the penalty kill. at the 90-second mark, Ian Shane fumbled a clearing attempt and the puck came to Devine right in front of the net. When he went to shoot the puck it hopped and was sent wide. Cornell managed to kill of the disadvantage and tried to set up a tying goal. Seger found Walsh off to the side of the cage and but his one-timer was stopped by Davis and Denver advanced to the Frozen Four.

== Ranking ==
=== USCHO ===
Team	Pre	1	2	3	4	5	6	7	8	9	10	12	13	14	15	16	17	18	19	20	21	22	23	24	Final
Brown	NR	NR	NR	NR	NR	NR	NR	NR	NR	NR	NR	NR	NR	NR	NR	NR	NR	NR	NR	NR	NR	NR	NR	NR	NR
Clarkson	NR	NR	NR	NR	NR	NR	NR	NR	NR	NR	NR	NR	NR	NR	NR	NR	NR	NR	NR	NR	NR	NR	NR	NR	NR
Colgate	NR	NR	NR	NR	NR	NR	NR	NR	NR	NR	NR	NR	NR	NR	NR	NR	NR	NR	NR	NR	NR	NR	NR	NR	NR
Cornell	11	11	11	12	10	7	10	16	16	18	17	16	18	14	13	13	13	12	11	13	13	15	14	12	9
Dartmouth	NR	NR	NR	NR	NR	NR	NR	NR	NR	NR	NR	NR	NR	NR	NR	NR	NR	NR	NR	NR	NR	NR	NR	NR	NR
Harvard	15	16	15	17	19	NR	NR	NR	NR	NR	NR	NR	NR	NR	NR	NR	NR	NR	NR	NR	NR	NR	NR	NR	NR
Princeton	NR	NR	NR	NR	NR	NR	NR	NR	NR	NR	NR	NR	NR	NR	NR	NR	NR	NR	NR	NR	NR	NR	NR	NR	NR
Quinnipiac	2	5	4	5	8	10	7	3	5	5	3	3	5	3	7	7	5	9	7	7	7	7	6	8	6
Rensselaer	NR	NR	NR	NR	NR	NR	NR	NR	NR	NR	NR	NR	NR	NR	NR	NR	NR	NR	NR	NR	NR	NR	NR	NR	NR
St. Lawrence	NR	NR	NR	NR	NR	NR	NR	NR	NR	NR	NR	NR	NR	NR	NR	NR	NR	NR	NR	NR	NR	NR	NR	NR	NR
Union	NR	NR	NR	NR	NR	NR	NR	NR	NR	NR	NR	NR	NR	NR	NR	NR	NR	NR	NR	NR	NR	NR	NR	NR	NR
Yale	NR	NR	NR	NR	NR	NR	NR	NR	NR	NR	NR	NR	NR	NR	NR	NR	NR	NR	NR	NR	NR	NR	NR	NR	NR

=== USA Hockey ===
Team	Pre	1	2	3	4	5	6	7	8	9	10	11	13	14	15	16	17	18	19	20	21	22	23	24	25	Final
Brown	NR	NR	NR	NR	NR	NR	NR	NR	NR	NR	NR	NR	NR	NR	NR	NR	NR	NR	NR	NR	NR	NR	NR	NR	NR	NR
Clarkson	NR	NR	NR	NR	NR	NR	NR	NR	NR	NR	NR	NR	NR	NR	NR	NR	NR	NR	NR	NR	NR	NR	NR	NR	NR	NR
Colgate	NR	NR	NR	NR	NR	NR	NR	NR	NR	NR	NR	NR	NR	NR	NR	NR	NR	NR	NR	NR	NR	NR	NR	NR	NR	NR
Cornell	14	11	8	11	10	7	10	17	16	18	17	17	17	15	13	13	12	12	13	15	15	15	14	11	9	9
Dartmouth	NR	NR	NR	NR	NR	NR	NR	NR	NR	NR	NR	NR	NR	NR	NR	NR	NR	NR	NR	NR	NR	NR	NR	NR	NR	NR
Harvard	13	16	15	13	15	20	20	20	NR	NR	NR	NR	NR	NR	NR	NR	NR	NR	NR	NR	NR	NR	NR	NR	NR	NR
Princeton	NR	NR	NR	NR	NR	NR	NR	NR	NR	NR	NR	NR	NR	NR	NR	NR	NR	NR	NR	NR	NR	NR	NR	NR	NR	NR
Quinnipiac	3	4	4	5	7	10	7	3	4	4	3	3	5	3	8	7	5	9	7	7	7	7	6	8	6	6
Rensselaer	NR	NR	NR	NR	NR	NR	NR	NR	NR	NR	NR	NR	NR	NR	NR	NR	NR	NR	NR	NR	NR	NR	NR	NR	NR	NR
St. Lawrence	NR	NR	NR	NR	NR	NR	NR	NR	NR	NR	NR	NR	NR	NR	NR	NR	NR	NR	NR	NR	NR	NR	NR	NR	NR	NR
Union	NR	NR	NR	NR	NR	NR	NR	NR	NR	NR	NR	NR	NR	NR	NR	NR	NR	NR	NR	NR	NR	NR	NR	NR	NR	NR
Yale	NR	NR	NR	NR	NR	NR	NR	NR	NR	NR	NR	NR	NR	NR	NR	NR	NR	NR	NR	NR	NR	NR	NR	NR	NR	NR

=== Pairwise ===
Team	1	2	3	4	5	6	7	8	9	10	12	13	14	15	16	17	18	19	20	21	22	23	Final
Brown	32	56	59	17	26	50	46	54	54	55	57	57	50	51	51	56	57	59	60	60	61	61	61
Clarkson	16	29	46	41	36	35	34	32	33	28	30	31	30	31	32	37	36	36	38	35	38	37	36
Colgate	31	10	31	39	41	49	35	45	44	43	42	38	39	36	36	31	31	32	33	30	31	36	36
Cornell	32	56	59	19	3	16	22	21	23	21	21	20	16	15	15	14	13	14	15	16	17	14	12
Dartmouth	32	56	59	63	32	18	17	28	42	30	32	28	35	40	39	37	37	35	32	29	30	26	29
Harvard	32	56	59	61	52	20	20	31	52	46	52	56	54	54	49	50	51	48	53	52	49	50	50
Princeton	32	56	59	64	61	32	44	57	57	48	44	48	49	52	51	53	53	57	51	54	53	54	53
Quinnipiac	29	23	9	6	7	1	1	2	4	1	3	5	4	8	8	6	9	8	7	8	8	7	9
Rensselaer	32	56	58	58	53	46	53	57	60	59	47	49	51	55	56	54	56	52	56	55	53	54	53
St. Lawrence	1	27	51	50	51	54	61	62	54	52	52	54	59	53	49	55	49	54	54	51	48	45	43
Union	1	16	29	37	46	48	52	44	42	38	34	42	40	39	35	36	37	36	40	38	37	38	39
Yale	32	56	59	48	47	57	58	59	61	55	54	42	44	50	46	46	44	45	46	48	51	50	51

Note: teams ranked in the top-10 automatically qualify for the NCAA tournament. Teams ranked 11-16 can qualify based upon conference tournament results.

== Awards ==
=== NCAA ===
AHCA All-American Teams
East Second Team	Position
Ian Shane, Cornell	G
John Prokop, Union	D
Collin Graf, Quinnipiac	F

Award		Recipient
Player of the Year		Collin Graf, Quinnipiac
Best Defensive Forward		Jacob Quillan, Quinnipiac
Best Defensive Defenseman		Trey Taylor, Clarkson
Rookie of the Year		C. J. Foley, Dartmouth
Ken Dryden Award		Ian Shane, Cornell
Student-Athlete of the Year		Gabriel Seger, Cornell
Wayne Dean Sportsmanship Award		Ben Tupker, Union
Tim Taylor Award		Reid Cashman, Dartmouth
Most Outstanding Player in Tournament		Jonathan Castagna, Cornell
All-ECAC Hockey Teams
First Team	Position	Second Team
Ian Shane, Cornell	G	Cooper Black, Dartmouth
John Prokop, Union	D	Trey Taylor, Clarkson
Jayden Lee, Quinnipiac	D	Tommy Bergsland, Colgate
Collin Graf, Quinnipiac	F	Jacob Quillan, Quinnipiac
Luke Haymes, Dartmouth	F	Sam Lipkin, Quinnipiac
Gabriel Seger, Cornell	F	Liam Robertson, Union
Third Team	Position	Rookie Team
Vinny Duplessis, Quinnipiac	G	Jack Stark, Yale
Ben Robertson, Cornell	D	C. J. Foley, Dartmouth
C. J. Foley, Dartmouth	D	Ben Robertson, Cornell
Dalton Bancroft, Clarkson	F	Mason Marcellus, Quinnipiac
Joe Miller, Harvard	F	Jonathan Castagna, Cornell
Mathieu Gosselin, Clarkson	F	Jake Schneider, Colgate
ECAC Hockey All-Tournament Team
Ben Kraws, St. Lawrence	G	
Ben Robertson, Cornell	D	
John Fusco, Dartmouth	D	
Jonathan Castagna, Cornell	F	
Gabriel Seger, Cornell	F	
Tomáš Mazura, St. Lawrence	F	

== 2024 NHL entry draft ==
Round	Pick	Player	College	NHL team
4	107	Heikki Ruohonen ^{†}	Harvard	Philadelphia Flyers
4	110	Elliott Groenewold ^{†}	Quinnipiac	Boston Bruins
5	154	Jonathan Morello ^{†}	Clarkson	Boston Bruins
6	166	Ben Merrill ^{†}	Harvard	Montreal Canadiens
6	179	Xavier Veilleux ^{†}	Cornell	New York Islanders
7	200	Matt Lahey ^{†}	Clarkson	Toronto Maple Leafs

† incoming freshman
