= 2024 ECAC Hockey men's ice hockey tournament =

Ice hockey tournament

- Dates: March 8–23, 2024
- Teams: 12
- Finals site: Herb Brooks Arena; Lake Placid, New York
- Champions: Cornell (13th title)
- Winning coach: Mike Schafer (6th title)
- MVP: Jonathan Castagna (Cornell)
- ECAC Hockey men's Ice Hockey Tournaments

The 2024 ECAC Hockey men's ice hockey tournament was the 63rd tournament in league history. It was played between March 8 and March 23, 2024. By winning the tournament, Cornell received ECAC Hockey's automatic bid to the 2024 NCAA Division I men's ice hockey tournament.

== Format ==
The tournament features four rounds of play. The teams that finish above fifth place in the standings received a bye to the quarterfinal round. In the first round, the fifth and twelfth seeds, the sixth and eleventh seeds, the seventh and tenth seeds and the eighth and ninth seeds played a single-elimination game with the winners advancing to the quarterfinals. In the quarterfinals the one seed played the lowest remaining seed, the second seed played the second-lowest remaining seed, the third seed played the third-lowest remaining seed and the fourth seed played the fourth-lowest remaining seed each in a best-of-three series with the winners of these the series advancing to the semifinals. In the semifinals the top remaining seed played the lowest remaining seed while the two remaining teams play against each other. The winners of the semifinals play in the championship game, and no third-place game is played. All series after the quarterfinals are single-elimination games. The tournament champion receives an automatic bid to the 2024 NCAA Division I men's ice hockey tournament.

== Conference standings ==
2023–24 ECAC Hockey Standings
	Conference record										Overall record					
	GP	W	L	T	OTW	OTL	SW	PTS	GF	GA	GP	W	L	T	GF	GA
#6 Quinnipiac †	22	17	4	1	0	2	0	54	99	39	39	27	10	2	160	79
#9 Cornell *	22	12	6	4	1	2	3	44	74	45	35	22	7	6	115	65
Colgate	22	13	7	2	2	2	2	43	85	68	36	16	16	4	120	112
Dartmouth	22	9	6	7	1	1	3	37	66	60	32	13	10	9	92	91
Clarkson	22	12	9	1	4	2	1	36	62	58	35	18	16	1	95	97
Union	22	9	10	3	1	1	2	32	75	75	37	16	18	3	123	121
St. Lawrence	22	8	10	4	1	1	1	29	49	64	39	14	19	6	90	118
Harvard	22	6	10	6	1	2	3	28	49	64	32	7	19	6	70	106
Princeton	22	8	11	3	4	0	2	25	70	90	30	10	16	4	89	114
Yale	22	7	13	2	1	2	1	25	46	57	30	10	18	2	63	91
Brown	22	6	14	2	2	3	1	22	43	69	30	8	19	3	61	98
Rensselaer	22	6	13	3	0	0	0	21	58	89	37	10	23	4	93	150
Championship: March 23, 2024 † indicates conference regular season champion (Cleary Cup) * indicates conference tournament champion (Whitelaw Cup); Rankings: USCHO.com Top 20 Poll

== Bracket ==
Teams are reseeded for the semifinals

First Round; March 8–9
5	Clarkson	2
12	Rensselaer	3
6	Union	6
11	Brown	0
7	St. Lawrence	4
10	Yale	2
8	Harvard	1
9	Princeton	0

Quarterfinals; March 15–17
1	Quinnipiac	5	5	-
12	Rensselaer	1	2	-
2	Cornell	4	4	-
8	Harvard	3	1	-
3	Colgate	2	2	-
7	St. Lawrence	3**	3	-
4	Dartmouth	3	4	-
6	Union	1	2	-

Semifinals; March 22
1	Quinnipiac	0
7	St. Lawrence	3
2	Cornell	6
4	Dartmouth	3

Championship; March 23
7	St. Lawrence	1
2	Cornell	3

Note: * denotes overtime period(s)

== Results ==
Note: All game times are local.

=== First Round ===
==== (5) Clarkson vs. (12) Rensselaer ====
March 9, 2024; 7:00 pm	Clarkson	2–3 (1–1, 1–0, 2–0)	Rensselaer	Cheel Arena; Attendance: 2,834

Game reference

Austin Roden
Goalies
Jack Watson
Referees:
Joe Carusone
Tyler Loftus
Linesmen:
John Rey
Adam Wood

	0–1	00:40 – Tyler Hotson (13) (Brushett, Tinling)
	0–2	11:38 – PP – John Beaton (4) (Heidemann, Agnew)
	0–3	49:05 – GW – Sutter Muzzatti (14) (Sertti, Heidemann)
(Sarsland) Ellis Rickwood (4) – 53:13	1–3
(Martino, Taylor) Mathieu Gosselin (6) – EA – 57:51	2–3

4 min
Penalties
8 min
36
Shots
17

==== (6) Union vs. (11) Brown ====
March 9, 2024; 4:00 pm	Union	6–0 (1–0, 2–0, 3–0)	Brown	Achilles Rink; Attendance: 2,035

Game reference

Kyle Chauvette
Goalies
Lawton Zacher
Referees:
William Brennan III
Tom Steinel
Linesmen:
Ryan Knapp
Stephen Drain

(Nixon, Ferguson) Caden Villega (9) – GW – 14:57	1–0
(Immonen) D. J. Hart (1) – SH – 27:34	2–0
(Robertson) Chaz Smedsrud (14) – 30:33	3–0
(Kelly, Messina) Ben Tupker (8) – 46:34	4–0
(Immonen) Caden Villegas (10) – 51:33	5–0
(unassisted) Ben Tupker (9) – SH EN – 54:05	6–0

6 min
Penalties
4 min
40
Shots
22

==== (7) St. Lawrence vs. (10) Yale ====
March 8, 2024; 7:00 pm	St. Lawrence	4–2 (1–0, 3–2, 0–0)	Yale	Appleton Arena; Attendance: 1,577

Game reference

Ben Kraws
Goalies
Jack Stark
Referees:
Jason Williams
Matt Wyld
Linesmen:
Jason Shattie
Ryan Chauvin

(Chapleau, Burgin) Tomáš Mazura (5) – 11:57	1–0
	1–1	24:23 – Briggs Gammill (14) (unassisted)
(Gavars, Burgin) Tyler Cristall (7) – PP – 25:12	2–1
	2–2	27:05 – PP – Ian Carpentier (8) (Szeto, Conroy)
(Waite, Boyer) Greg Lapointe (6) – GW – 32:40	3–2
(Lasak, Ritchie) Jan Olenginski (2) – 34:08	4–2

8 min
Penalties
13 min
33
Shots
39

==== (8) Harvard vs. (9) Princeton ====
March 8, 2024; 7:00 pm	Harvard	1–0 (1–0, 0–0, 0–0)	Princeton	Bright-Landry Hockey Center; Attendance: 1,482

Game reference
Aku Koskenvuo	Goalies	Arthur Smith	Referees: CJ Hanafin; Cameron Lynch; Linesmen: Patrick Dapuzzo; Robert Peterkin
(Bar, Guzzo) Ian Moore (6) – GW – 13:18 / 1–0			Referees: CJ Hanafin; Cameron Lynch; Linesmen: Patrick Dapuzzo; Robert Peterkin
4 min	Penalties	2 min	Referees: CJ Hanafin; Cameron Lynch; Linesmen: Patrick Dapuzzo; Robert Peterkin
17	Shots	38	Referees: CJ Hanafin; Cameron Lynch; Linesmen: Patrick Dapuzzo; Robert Peterkin

=== Quarterfinals ===
==== (1) Quinnipiac vs. (12) Rensselaer ====
March 15, 2024; 7:00 pm	Quinnipiac	5–1 (1–0, 2–1, 2–0)	Rensselaer	M&T Bank Arena; Attendance: 2,721

Game reference

Vinny Duplessis
Goalies
Jack Watson
Referees:
Kenneth Gates
Cameron Lynch
Linesmen:
Phil Kitchen
John Rey

(Czerneckianair, Power) Anthony Cipollone (6) – 1:45	1–0
(Marcellus, Cerbone) Jacob Quillan (14) – GW – 20:45	2–0
	2–1	28:49 – Nick Ardanaz (1) (Tinling, Heidemann)
(Marcellus) Andon Cerbone (10) – 31:16	3–1
(Quillan, Treloar) Sam Lipkin (15) – 44:47	4–1
(Marcellus, Legault) Collin Graf (21) – 53:51	5–1

6 min
Penalties
4 min
35
Shots
21

March 16, 2024; 7:00 pm	Quinnipiac	5–2 (0–0, 2–2, 3–0)	Rensselaer	M&T Bank Arena; Attendance: 2,909

Game reference

Vinny Duplessis
Goalies
Jack Watson
Referees:
Kenneth Gates
Cameron Lynch
Linesmen:
Phil Kitchen
John Rey

(Quillan, Marcellus) Andon Cerbone (11) – 35:24	1–0
(Moore, McGroarty) Anthony Cipollone (7) – 36:23	2–0
	2–1	36:41 – Lauri Sertti (2) (Hotson)
	2–2	38:21 – SH – Sutter Muzzatti (10) (Ciccarello)
(Lee, Marcellus) Andon Cerbone (12) – GW PP – 49:13	3–2
(Cerbone, Marcellus) Jacob Quillan (15) – 58:52	4–2
(Quillan) Collin Graf (22) – 59:53	5–2

17 min
Penalties
10 min
32
Shots
25

Quinnipiac Won Series 2–0

==== (2) Cornell vs. (8) Harvard ====
March 15, 2024; 7:00 pm	Cornell	4–3 (3–0, 1–1, 0–2)	Harvard	Lynah Rink; Attendance: 4,267

Game reference

Ian Shane
Goalies
Aku Koskenvuo
Referees:
CJ Hanafin
Kevin Graber
Linesmen:
Stephen Drain
Adam Wood

(Robertson) Jack O'Leary (6) – 4:30	1–0
(Castagna, Rego) Sullivan Mack (5) – 7:26	2–0
(Bancroft, Psenicka) Ryan Walsh (11) – 19:22	3–0
(Psenicka, Mack) Nick DeSantis (5) – GW PP – 25:12	4–0
	4–1	32:37 – Joe Miller (15) (Langenbrunner, MacDonald)
	4–2	44:49 – Casey Severo (15) (Johnson, Callow)
	4–3	53:39 – Joe Miller (13) (MacDonald, Tresca)

6 min
Penalties
6 min
23
Shots
25

March 16, 2024; 7:00 pm	Cornell	4–1 (1–0, 1–0, 2–1)	Harvard	Lynah Rink; Attendance: 4,267

Game reference

Ian Shane
Goalies
Derek Mullahy
Referees:
CJ Hanafin
Kevin Graber
Linesmen:
Stephen Drain
Adam Wood

(Bancroft, Seger) Ben Robertson (4) – 15:10	1–0
(Psenicka, Penney) Gabriel Seger (13) – GW – 34:44	2–0
	2–1	47:01 – EA – Ian Moore (3) (Healey, MacDonald)
(Seger) Ben Robertson (5) – EN – 59:22	3–1
(Penney, Psenicka) Gabriel Seger (14) – EN – 59:37	4–1

2 min
Penalties
17 min
25
Shots
22

Cornell Won Series 2–0

==== (3) Colgate vs. (7) St. Lawrence ====
March 15, 2024; 7:00 pm	Colgate	2–3 (2 OT) (0–0, 0–2, 2–0, 0–0, 0–1)	St. Lawrence	Class of 1965 Arena; Attendance: 763

Game reference

Carter Gylander
Goalies
Ben Kraws
Referees:
Joe Carusone
Anthony Kenney
Linesmen:
Jordan Patarino
Patrick Dapuzzo

	0–1	28:34 – PP – Ján Lašák (15) (Naaykens, Burgin)
	0–2	29:04 – Josh Boyer (3) (Mazura, Trela)
(Labelle) Tommy Bergsland (5) – PP – 43:52	1–2
(Chorske, Bergsland) Alex DiPaolo (12) – 53:17	2–2
	2–3	87:24 – GW – Luc Salem (3) (Boyer)

2 min
Penalties
4 min
49
Shots
33

March 16, 2024; 7:00 pm	Colgate	2–3 (1–0, 0–2, 1–1)	St. Lawrence	Class of 1965 Arena; Attendance: 834

Game reference

Carter Gylander
Goalies
Ben Kraws
Referees:
Joe Carusone
Anthony Kenney
Linesmen:
Jordan Patarino
Patrick Dapuzzo

(Foglia, DiPaolo) Ryan Sullivan (6) – 14:50	1–0
	1–1	25:37 – Cameron Buhl (3) (Boyer)
	1–2	34:55 – Felikss Gavars (13) (Mazura, Moran)
(Mitton) Ryan McGuire (14) – PP – 46:23	2–2
	2–3	49:10 – GW – Jan Olenginski (3) (Cristall, Naaykens)

4 min
Penalties
8 min
43
Shots
22

St. Lawrence Won Series 2–0

==== (4) Dartmouth vs. (6) Union ====
March 15, 2024; 7:00 pm	Dartmouth	3–1 (0–1, 3–0, 0–0)	Union	Thompson Arena; Attendance: 1,625

Game reference

Cooper Black
Goalies
Kyle Chauvette
Referees:
Jason Williams
Tom Steinel
Linesmen:
Ryan Knapp
Jason Shattie

	0–1	13:28 – Nick Young (15) (Villegas)
(Charpentier, Chisholm) Braiden Dorfman (7) – 20:33	1–1
(MacDonald) Matt Fusco (2) – GW – 26:39	2–1
(MacDonald, Townley) Joey Musa (6) – 39:43	3–1

10 min
Penalties
14 min
25
Shots
24

March 16, 2024; 7:00 pm	Dartmouth	4–2 (1–1, 1–1, 2–0)	Union	Thompson Arena; Attendance: 2,007

Game reference

Cooper Black
Goalies
Kyle Chauvette
Referees:
Jason Williams
Tom Steinel
Linesmen:
Ryan Knapp
Jason Shattie

	0–1	7:49 – PP – Caden Villegas (11) (Ferguson, MacArthur)
(Chisholm, Desilets) Braiden Dorfman (8) – 15:39	1–1
	1–2	23:49 – Caden Villegas (12) (Nixon)
(Dorfman, Chisholm) Matt Fusco (3) – 29:02	2–2
(Flinton) Luke Haymes (18) – GW – 54:04	3–2
(J. Fusco, Chisholm) Cam MacDonald (4) – EN – 59:21	4–2

9 min
Penalties
8 min
25
Shots
26

Dartmouth Won Series 2–0

=== Semifinals ===
==== (1) Quinnipiac vs. (7) St. Lawrence ====
March 22, 2024; 4:00 pm	Quinnipiac	0–3 (0–0, 0–2, 0–1)	St. Lawrence	Herb Brooks Arena; Attendance: 4,015

Game reference

Vinny Duplessis
Goalies
Ben Kraws
Referees:
CJ Hanafin
William Brennan III
Linesmen:
Stephen Drain
Adam Wood

0–1	27:43 – GW – Tomáš Mazura (6) (Moran, Gavars)
0–2	31:23 – PP – Max Dorrington (2) (Gavars, Burgin)
0–3	58:08 – EN – Ty Naaykens (6) (Dorrington, Paul)

6 min
Penalties
2 min
22
Shots
25

==== (2) Cornell vs. (4) Dartmouth ====
March 22, 2024; 7:30 pm	Cornell	6–3 (0–1, 1–2, 5–0)	Dartmouth	Herb Brooks Arena; Attendance: 4,015

Game reference

Ian Shane
Goalies
Cooper Black
Referees:
Cameron Lynch
Kevin Graber
Linesmen:
Ryan Knapp
Patrick Dapuzzo

	0–1	15:02 – Sean Chisholm (6) (Dorfman, Musa)
(Kraft, Robertson) Ondřej Pšenička (9) – 24:15	1–1
	1–2	25:25 – John Fusco (6) (Flinton, Morgan)
	1–3	32:18 – PP – John Fusco (7) (Dorfman, Chisholm)
(Seger, Robertson) Dalton Bancroft (12) – PP – 40:43	2–3
(Seger, DeSantis) Kyle Penney (9) – 48:32	3–3
(Pšenička, Bancroft) Ryan Walsh (12) – GW – 49:22	4–3
(Penney, Seger) Nick DeSantis (6) – EN – 57:01	5–3
(Rego) Nick DeSantis (7) – EN – 58:24	6–3

4 min
Penalties
2 min
33
Shots
30

=== Championship ===
==== (2) Cornell vs. (7) St. Lawrence ====
March 22, 2024; 5:00 pm	Cornell	3–1 (1–0, 1–0, 1–1)	St. Lawrence	Herb Brooks Arena; Attendance: 4,912

Game reference

Ian Shane
Goalies
Ben Kraws
Referees:
Jason Williams
Joe Carusone
Linesmen:
Jason Shattie
John Ray

(Bancroft, Suda) Jonathan Castagna (10) – 6:15	1–0
(Mack, Kempf) Jonathan Castagna (11) – GW – 25:13	2–0
	2–1	44:54 – Cameron Buhl (4) (Chapleau, Ritchie)
(Bancroft, Kempf) Jack O'Leary (7) – EN – 59:32	3–1

4 min
Penalties
4 min
29
Shots
32

== Tournament awards ==
=== All-Tournament Team ===
- G Ben Kraws (St. Lawrence)
- D Ben Robertson (Cornell)
- D John Fusco (Dartmouth)
- F Jonathan Castagna* (Cornell)
- F Gabriel Seger (Cornell)
- F Tomáš Mazura (St. Lawrence)

* Most Outstanding Player(s)
