= 2023–24 Brown Bears men's ice hockey season =

Ice hockey season

- Conference: 11th ECAC Hockey
- Home ice: Meehan Auditorium

Rankings
- USCHO: NR
- USA Hockey: NR

Record
- Overall: 8–19–3
- Conference: 6–14–2
- Home: 5–9–2
- Road: 3–10–1

Coaches and captains
- Head coach: Brendan Whittet
- Assistant coaches: Jason Smith; Matt Plante; Ed Kesell
- Captain: Jordan Tonelli
- Alternate captain(s): Brett Bliss; Matt Sutton

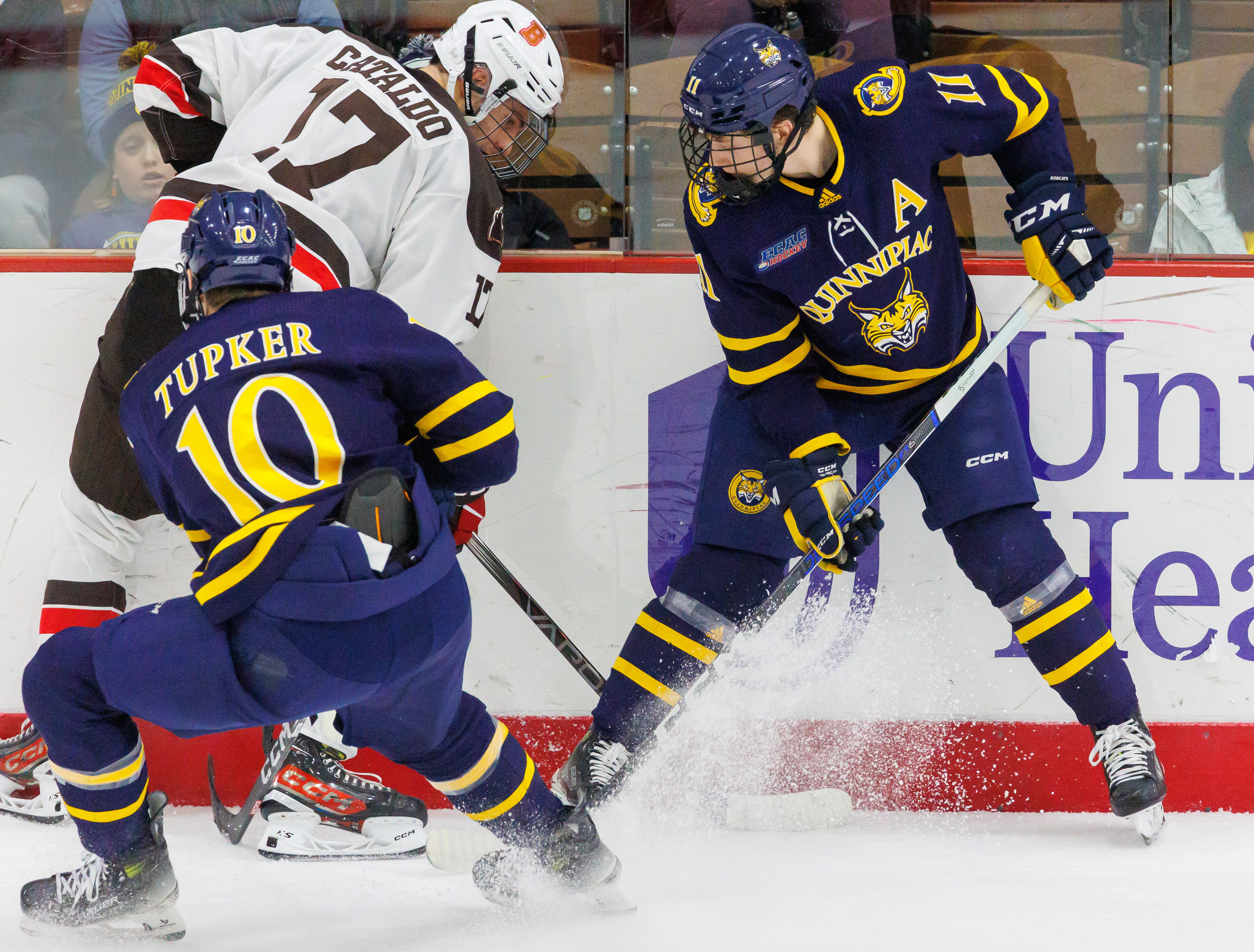
Feb 23: Zach Tupker and Collin Graf (Quinnipiac) with Mike Cataldo (Brown)

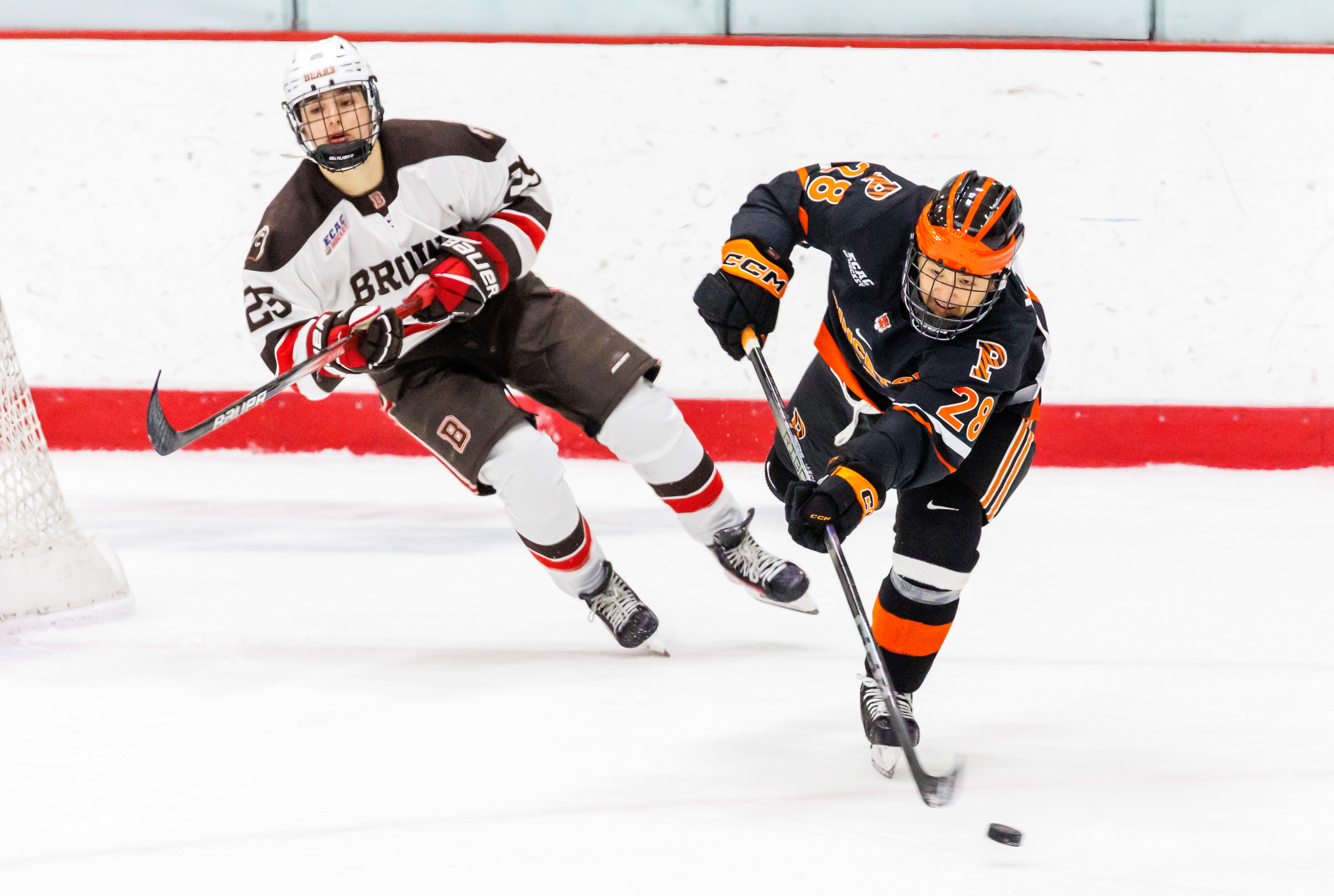
Feb. 24: Zackary Tonelli (Brown) and Brendan Wang (Princeton)

The 2023–24 Brown Bears Men's ice hockey season was the 106th season of play for the program and the 62nd in the ECAC Hockey conference. The Bears represented Brown University, played their home games at the Meehan Auditorium and were coached by Brendan Whittet in his 14th season.

== Season ==
Brown's season followed nearly the same path that it had in 2023. The Bears began poorly, losing six of their first nine due mostly to a weak offense. The goaltending dual that arose out of training camp was soon settled in favor of Lawton Zacher. However, in spite of stable goaltending, Brown was unable to capitalize on many resulting opportunities. In the first three months of the season, The Bears managed 3 goals in just four of fourteen games.

When the team started the second half of its season, there was a mild uptick in scoring but that was enough to give the Bears four wins in six games. The mini-streak put Brown in the middle of the conference standings and had them briefly competing for a home site in the conference playoffs. Once February rolled around, all of those gains were washed away. The offense slept-walked through the rest of their schedule and Brown didn't win once in their final nine games. The losing skid sent the team plummeting to the bottom of the standings and they finished just a single point out of last place.

The postseason opened with Union getting off to a quick start and never looking back. Brown was badly outplayed by the Garnet Chargers in the first two periods and found themselves down by three goals entering the third. The Bears were forced to abandon their defensive structure to try and tie the game but all that did was give Union free rein to all to their lead. When the dust settled, Brown was on the wrong end of a 0–6 score and their lackluster season was over.

== Departures ==
Player	Position	Nationality	Cause
Luke Albert	Defenseman	Canada	Graduation (retired)
Mathieu Caron	Goaltender	Canada	Transferred to Boston University
Brad Cocca	Forward	Canada	Graduation (retired)
James Crossman	Defenseman	United States	Graduate transfer to Michigan State
James Durham	Goaltender	United States	Left program (retired)
Luke Krys	Defenseman	United States	Graduate transfer to Providence
Connor Marshall	Forward	United States	Graduation (retired)
Samuli Niinisaari	Defenseman	Finland	Graduate transfer to Massachusetts
Nathan Plessis	Forward	Canada	Graduation (retired)
Jonny Russell	Forward	United States	Graduation (retired)

== Recruiting ==
Player	Position	Nationality	Age	Notes
Griffen Barr	Defenseman	Canada	21	Nanaimo, BC
Matthew Brille	Forward	United States	20	Bethesda, MD
Michael Cataldo	Forward	United States	20	Norfolk, MA
Stephen Chen	Goaltender	China	18	Beijing, CHN
Tyler Kopff	Forward	United States	20	Ridgewood, NJ
Ethan Mistry	Forward	Canada	20	Toronto, ON
Alex Pineau	Defenseman	Canada	20	Thunder Bay, ON
Max Scott	Forward	United States	20	San Jose, CA
Tyler Shea	Goaltender	United States	22	Stevenson Ranch, CA; transfer from Michigan
Ryan St. Louis	Forward	United States	20	Burlington, VT; transfer from Northeastern
Lawton Zacher	Goaltender	United States	19	Buffalo, NY

== Roster ==
As of July 20, 2023.

No.	Nat.	Player	Class	Pos	Height	Weight	DoB	Hometown	Previous team	NHL rights
1	(United States)	Lawton Zacher	Freshman	G	6' 2" (1.88 m)	180 lb (82 kg)	2003-12-31	Buffalo, New York	Minot Minotauros (NAHL)	—
3	(Canada)	Alex Pineau	Freshman	D	6' 3" (1.91 m)	205 lb (93 kg)	2003-01-21	Thunder Bay, Ontario	Des Moines Buccaneers (USHL)	—
4	(United States)	Brett Bliss (A)	Junior	D	6' 2" (1.88 m)	190 lb (86 kg)	2001-12-29	Chelmsford, Massachusetts	Surrey Eagles (BCHL)	—
5	(United States)	Nick Traggio	Sophomore	D	6' 2" (1.88 m)	210 lb (95 kg)	2001-08-01	Sharon, Connecticut	Bonnyville Pontiacs (AJHL)	—
6	(United States)	Harry Meirowitz	Sophomore	D	6' 0" (1.83 m)	185 lb (84 kg)	2003-05-21	Old Westbury, New York	P.A.L. Jr. Islanders (NCDC)	—
7	(Canada)	Griffen Barr	Freshman	D	6' 0" (1.83 m)	200 lb (91 kg)	2002-03-19	Nanaimo, British Columbia	Vernon Vipers (BCHL)	—
8	(Canada)	Ryan Shostak	Sophomore	F	6' 0" (1.83 m)	190 lb (86 kg)	2001-09-08	Calgary, Alberta	Vernon Vipers (BCHL)	—
9	(United States)	Ryan St. Louis	Sophomore	F	5' 10" (1.78 m)	170 lb (77 kg)	2003-06-13	Old Greenwich, Connecticut	Dubuque Fighting Saints (USHL)	—
10	(United States)	Ryan Bottrill	Sophomore	F	6' 1" (1.85 m)	185 lb (84 kg)	2002-02-04	Chandler, Arizona	Maryland Black Bears (NAHL)	—
11	(United States)	Tyler Kopff	Freshman	F	6' 4" (1.93 m)	205 lb (93 kg)	2003-04-22	Ridgewood, New Jersey	Coquitlam Express (BCHL)	—
12	(United States)	Matt Sutton (A)	Senior	F	6' 0" (1.83 m)	190 lb (86 kg)	2001-05-26	Pittsburgh, Pennsylvania	Omaha Lancers (USHL)	—
13	(Canada)	Lynden Grandberg	Junior	F	6' 0" (1.83 m)	173 lb (78 kg)	2001-05-21	Calgary, Alberta	Camrose Kodiaks (AJHL)	—
14	(United States)	Spence Evans	Junior	D	6' 3" (1.91 m)	195 lb (88 kg)	2002-04-29	Oyster Bay Cove, New York	Johnstown Tomahawks (NAHL)	—
15	(United States)	Tony Andreozzi	Junior	D	5' 11" (1.8 m)	190 lb (86 kg)	2000-04-16	Winchester, Massachusetts	Salmon Arm Silverbacks (BCHL)	—
16	(United States)	Thomas Manty	Junior	F	5' 10" (1.78 m)	175 lb (79 kg)	2000-02-04	Andover, Massachusetts	Aberdeen Wings (NAHL)	—
17	(United States)	Mike Cataldo	Freshman	F	6' 1" (1.85 m)	200 lb (91 kg)	2003-05-04	Norfolk, Massachusetts	Bonnyville Pontiacs (AJHL)	—
18	(United States)	Dean Bauchiero	Sophomore	F	6' 4" (1.93 m)	215 lb (98 kg)	2002-03-04	Southington, Connecticut	Wichita Falls Warriors (NAHL)	—
19	(United States)	Matthew Brille	Freshman	F	5' 10" (1.78 m)	180 lb (82 kg)	2003-01-02	Bethesda, Maryland	Chippewa Steel (NAHL)	—
20	(Canada)	Noah Wakeford	Junior	F	5' 8" (1.73 m)	175 lb (79 kg)	2000-06-29	Okotoks, Alberta	Trail Smoke Eaters (BCHL)	—
21	(United States)	Wyatt Schlaht	Junior	F	6' 2" (1.88 m)	200 lb (91 kg)	2000-06-04	Cherry Hills Village, Colorado	Surrey Eagles (BCHL)	—
22	(Canada)	Ethan Mistry	Freshman	D	5' 10" (1.78 m)	175 lb (79 kg)	2003-02-04	Toronto, Ontario	Nanaimo Clippers (BCHL)	—
23	(Canada)	Jackson Munro	Junior	D	5' 11" (1.8 m)	180 lb (82 kg)	2000-02-11	Vancouver, British Columbia	Chilliwack Chiefs (BCHL)	—
24	(United States)	Brenden Clark	Junior	F	6' 0" (1.83 m)	185 lb (84 kg)	2002-01-16	Morris Plains, New Jersey	Johnstown Tomahawks (NAHL)	—
25	(United States)	Zackary Tonelli	Sophomore	F	5' 9" (1.75 m)	170 lb (77 kg)	2002-02-14	Greenwich, Connecticut	Vernon Vipers (BCHL)	—
26	(United States)	Max Scott	Freshman	F	6' 0" (1.83 m)	185 lb (84 kg)	2002-10-11	San Jose, California	North Iowa Bulls (NAHL)	—
27	(United States)	Jordan Tonelli (C)	Senior	F	6' 0" (1.83 m)	180 lb (82 kg)	2000-06-30	Greenwich, Connecticut	Cedar Rapids RoughRiders (USHL)	—
28	(United States)	Gavin Puskar	Senior	F	6' 1" (1.85 m)	190 lb (86 kg)	2001-06-21	Fairfield, Connecticut	Connecticut (HEA)	—
30	(United States)	Jacob Zacharewicz	Sophomore	G	6' 2" (1.88 m)	210 lb (95 kg)	2001-02-11	Riverhead, New York	El Paso Rhinos (NAHL)	—
31	(China)	Stephen Chen	Freshman	G	6' 0" (1.83 m)	170 lb (77 kg)	2005-07-26	Beijing, China	Mercer Chiefs (NCDC)	—
35	(United States)	Tyler Shea	Sophomore	G	5' 11" (1.8 m)	170 lb (77 kg)	2001-08-03	Stevenson Ranch, California	Michigan (Big Ten)	—

== Standings ==
2023–24 ECAC Hockey Standings
	Conference record										Overall record					
	GP	W	L	T	OTW	OTL	SW	PTS	GF	GA	GP	W	L	T	GF	GA
#6 Quinnipiac †	22	17	4	1	0	2	0	54	99	39	39	27	10	2	160	79
#9 Cornell *	22	12	6	4	1	2	3	44	74	45	35	22	7	6	115	65
Colgate	22	13	7	2	2	2	2	43	85	68	36	16	16	4	120	112
Dartmouth	22	9	6	7	1	1	3	37	66	60	32	13	10	9	92	91
Clarkson	22	12	9	1	4	2	1	36	62	58	35	18	16	1	95	97
Union	22	9	10	3	1	1	2	32	75	75	37	16	18	3	123	121
St. Lawrence	22	8	10	4	1	1	1	29	49	64	39	14	19	6	90	118
Harvard	22	6	10	6	1	2	3	28	49	64	32	7	19	6	70	106
Princeton	22	8	11	3	4	0	2	25	70	90	30	10	16	4	89	114
Yale	22	7	13	2	1	2	1	25	46	57	30	10	18	2	63	91
Brown	22	6	14	2	2	3	1	22	43	69	30	8	19	3	61	98
Rensselaer	22	6	13	3	0	0	0	21	58	89	37	10	23	4	93	150
Championship: March 23, 2024 † indicates conference regular season champion (Cleary Cup) * indicates conference tournament champion (Whitelaw Cup); Rankings: USCHO.com Top 20 Poll

== Schedule and results ==
Date	Time	Opponent^{#}	Rank^{#}	Site	TV	Decision	Result	Attendance	Record
Regular Season
October 27	8:00 pm	Yale		Meehan Auditorium • Providence, Rhode Island	ESPN+	Zacher	L 2–3 ^{OT}	798	0–1–0 (0–1–0)
October 29	2:00 pm	Stonehill*		Meehan Auditorium • Providence, Rhode Island	ESPN+	Zacher	W 7–2	488	1–1–0
November 3	7:00 pm	Colgate		Meehan Auditorium • Providence, Rhode Island	ESPN+	Shea	W 3–2	577	2–1–0 (1–1–0)
November 4	7:00 pm	#10 Cornell		Meehan Auditorium • Providence, Rhode Island	ESPN+	Shea	L 1–7	1,043	2–2–0 (1–2–0)
November 10	7:00 pm	at #10 Quinnipiac		M&T Bank Arena • Hamden, Connecticut	ESPN+	Shea	L 1–5	2,979	2–3–0 (1–3–0)
November 11	7:00 pm	at Princeton		Hobey Baker Memorial Rink • Princeton, New Jersey	ESPN+	Shea	L 2–3 ^{OT}	1,553	2–4–0 (1–4–0)
November 17	7:00 pm	Clarkson		Meehan Auditorium • Providence, Rhode Island	ESPN+	Zacher	L 2–3 ^{OT}	542	2–5–0 (1–5–0)
November 18	7:00 pm	St. Lawrence		Meehan Auditorium • Providence, Rhode Island	ESPN+	Zacher	W 2–1	673	3–5–0 (2–5–0)
November 24	7:00 pm	at Holy Cross*		Hart Center • Worcester, Massachusetts	FloHockey	Shea	L 3–6	647	3–6–0
December 1	7:00 pm	Long Island*		Meehan Auditorium • Providence, Rhode Island	ESPN+	Zacher	T 2–2 ^{OT}	464	3–6–1
December 3	4:00 pm	at Stonehill*		Bridgewater Ice Arena • Bridgewater, Massachusetts	NEC Front Row	Shea	W 4–1	217	4–6–1
December 9	7:00 pm	Northeastern*		Meehan Auditorium • Providence, Rhode Island	ESPN+	Zacher	L 4–1	1,077	4–7–1
December 29	7:00 pm	Merrimack*		Meehan Auditorium • Providence, Rhode Island	ESPN+	Zacher	L 1–5	610	4–8–1
December 30	7:00 pm	#10 Providence*		Meehan Auditorium • Providence, Rhode Island (Mayor's Cup)	ESPN+	Zacher	L 0–3	1,524	4–9–1
January 5	7:00 pm	at Union		Achilles Rink • Schenectady, New York	ESPN+	Zacher	W 3–2	1,822	5–9–1 (3–5–0)
January 6	7:00 pm	at Rensselaer		Houston Field House • Troy, New York	ESPN+	Zacher	L 1–2	1,572	5–10–1 (3–6–0)
January 12	7:00 pm	Harvard		Meehan Auditorium • Providence, Rhode Island	ESPN+	Zacher	W 5–3	1,112	6–10–1 (4–6–0)
January 13	7:00 pm	Dartmouth		Meehan Auditorium • Providence, Rhode Island	ESPN+	Zacher	W 2–1	672	7–10–1 (5–6–0)
January 19	7:00 pm	at St. Lawrence		Appleton Arena • Canton, New York	ESPN+	Zacher	L 1–2	914	7–11–1 (5–7–0)
January 20	7:00 pm	at Clarkson		Cheel Arena • Potsdam, New York	ESPN+	Zacher	W 3–2 ^{OT}	2,521	8–11–1 (6–7–0)
February 2	7:00 pm	Rensselaer		Meehan Auditorium • Providence, Rhode Island	ESPN+	Zacher	L 1–3	679	8–12–1 (6–8–0)
February 3	7:00 pm	Union		Meehan Auditorium • Providence, Rhode Island	ESPN+	Zacher	T 4–4 ^{SOL}	330	8–12–2 (6–8–1)
February 9	7:00 pm	at Yale		Ingalls Rink • New Haven, Connecticut	ESPN+	Zacher	L 1–3	1,637	8–13–2 (6–9–1)
February 16	7:00 pm	at #12 Cornell		Lynah Rink • Ithaca, New York	ESPN+	Zacher	L 0–3	4,267	8–14–2 (6–10–1)
February 17	7:00 pm	at Colgate		Class of 1965 Arena • Hamilton, New York	ESPN+	Zacher	L 2–4	1,059	8–15–2 (6–11–1)
February 23	7:00 pm	#7 Quinnipiac		Meehan Auditorium • Providence, Rhode Island	ESPN+	Zacher	L 2–5	1,042	8–16–2 (6–12–1)
February 24	7:00 pm	Princeton		Meehan Auditorium • Providence, Rhode Island	ESPN+	Zacher	L 1–5	895	8–17–2 (6–13–1)
March 1	7:00 pm	at Dartmouth		Thompson Arena • Hanover, New Hampshire	ESPN+	Shea	L 3–5	1,615	8–18–2 (6–14–1)
March 2	7:00 pm	at Harvard		Bright-Landry Hockey Center • Boston, Massachusetts	ESPN+	Zacher	T 1–1 ^{SOW}	1,697	8–18–3 (6–14–2)
ECAC Hockey Tournament
March 9	4:00 pm	at Union*		Achilles Rink • Schenectady, New York (First Round)	ESPN+	Zacher	L 0–6	2,035	8–19–3
*Non-conference game. ^{#}Rankings from USCHO.com Poll. All times are in Eastern Time. Source:

== Scoring statistics ==
Name	Position	Games	Goals	Assists	Points	PIM
Ryan St. Louis	LW	30	13	11	24	4
Ryan Bottrill	F	30	3	16	19	10
Max Scott	F	22	7	11	18	12
Tyler Kopff	F	30	6	12	18	16
Alex Pineau	D	30	7	8	15	20
Ethan Mistry	D	30	0	11	11	6
Brett Bliss	D	30	2	7	9	27
Matt Sutton	F	24	3	5	8	14
Jordan Tonelli	C/LW	16	3	4	7	8
Jackson Munro	D	18	2	4	6	10
Ryan Shostak	F	30	3	2	5	4
Tony Andreozzi	D	30	2	3	5	6
Nick Traggio	D	26	3	1	4	12
Thomas Manty	F	18	2	1	3	4
Mike Cataldo	C	26	2	1	3	8
Zackary Tonelli	F	30	1	2	3	6
Brendan Clark	F	16	0	3	3	14
Noah Wakeford	F	23	0	2	2	8
Wyatt Schlaht	F	10	1	0	1	0
Dean Bauchiero	W	21	1	0	1	6
Matthew Brille	F	11	0	1	1	0
Lawton Zacher	G	26	0	1	1	0
Harry Meirowitz	D	1	0	0	0	0
Spence Evans	D	9	0	0	0	0
Tyler Shea	G	10	0	0	0	0
Lynden Grandberg	F	18	0	0	0	0
Gavin Puskar	F	26	0	0	0	6
Total			61	106	167	201

== Goaltending statistics ==
Name	Games	Minutes	Wins	Losses	Ties	Goals against	Saves	Shut outs	SV %	GAA
Lawton Zacher	26	1380:40	6	14	3	67	667	0	.909	2.91
Tyler Shea	10	422:25	2	5	0	23	210	0	.901	3.27
Empty Net	-	21:29	-	-	-	8	-	-	-	-
Total	30	1824:54	8	19	3	98	877	0	.899	3.22

== Rankings ==
Poll	Week																										
Poll	Pre	1	2	3	4	5	6	7	8	9	10	11	12	13	14	15	16	17	18	19	20	21	22	23	24	25	26 (Final)
USCHO.com	NR	NR	NR	NR	NR	NR	NR	NR	NR	NR	NR	–	NR	NR	NR	NR	NR	NR	NR	NR	NR	NR	NR	NR	NR	–	NR
USA Hockey	NR	NR	NR	NR	NR	NR	NR	NR	NR	NR	NR	NR	–	NR	NR	NR	NR	NR	NR	NR	NR	NR	NR	NR	NR	NR	NR

Note: USCHO did not release a poll in weeks 11 and 25.
Note: USA Hockey did not release a poll in week 12.
