= 2023–24 Harvard Crimson men's ice hockey season =

College ice hockey season

- Conference: 8th ECAC Hockey
- Home ice: Bright-Landry Hockey Center

Rankings
- USCHO: NR
- USA Hockey: NR

Record
- Overall: 7–19–6
- Conference: 6–10–6
- Home: 5–6–3
- Road: 2–10–3
- Neutral: 0–3–0

Coaches and captains
- Head coach: Ted Donato
- Assistant coaches: Jim Tortorella; James Marcou; Brian Robinson
- Captain(s): Zakary Karpa; Ian Moore

The 2023–24 Harvard Crimson Men's ice hockey season was the 123rd season of play for the program and 62nd in ECAC Hockey. The Crimson represented Harvard University in the 2023–24 NCAA Division I men's ice hockey season, played their home games at Bright-Landry Hockey Center and were coached by Ted Donato in his 19th season.

== Season ==
Despite losing their top four scorers and starting goaltender from the previous season, Harvard was in the top-20 from earliest polls. To replace the departed talent, three NHL draftees were among the crop of freshman looking to help the Crimson return to the NCAA tournament. Unfortunately, very little went right for Harvard during the season. From the outset, the goaltending tandem of Koskenvuo and Mullahy did not play well enough to give the team a chance most nights. Over the course of the season, Harvard's goals against average was nearly a full goal more than it was the year before. Though Koskenvuo did possess marginally better numbers, it wasn't sufficient to give him the starting role outright.

Compounding the team's problems was a vast reduction in goal scoring. The team was unable to replace the offensive production lost to the professional ranks and, though three freshman did finish in the top 5 in team scoring (Callow, Johnson and MacDonald), their total combined contributions were less than what Harvard had received from Sean Farrell. Harvard scored 55 fewer goals than they had in 2023 and finished as one of the worst offensive teams in the nation. The team's situation was particularly dire in the first half of the year as the Crimson won just once in its first 14 games. Some improvements were seen in the second half but in the end Harvard posted one of its worst campaigns in decades. The seven wins on the year was the lowest number for the program since 1979.

== Departures ==
Player	Position	Nationality	Cause
Matthew Coronato	Forward	United States	Signed professional contract (Calgary Flames)
Wyllum Deveaux	Forward	Canada	Graduation (signed with Wheeling Nailers)
Sean Farrell	Forward	United States	Signed professional contract (Montreal Canadiens)
Jace Foskey	Defenseman	United States	Graduation (retired)
Mitchell Gibson	Goaltender	United States	Graduation (signed with Washington Capitals)
Alex Laferriere	Forward	United States	Signed professional contract (Los Angeles Kings)
Baker Shore	Forward	United States	Graduation (signed with South Carolina Stingrays)
Ryan Siedem	Defenseman	United States	Graduate transfer to Notre Dame
Henry Thrun	Defenseman	United States	Graduation (signed with San Jose Sharks)
Austin Wong	Forward	Canada	Graduation (signed with Kunlun Red Star)

== Recruiting ==
Player	Position	Nationality	Age	Notes
Michael Callow	Forward	United States	19	Boston, MA; selected 154th overall in 2022
Ryan Fine	Forward	United States	18	Center Moriches, NY
Peter Frates	Defenseman	United States	21	Needham, MA; transfer from Williams
Salvatore Guzzo	Forward	United States	18	Old Tappan, NJ
David Hejduk	Defenseman	United States	19	Parker, CO
Cameron Johnson	Forward	Canada	18	Vancouver, BC
Ben MacDonald	Forward	United States	19	Weston, MA; selected 91st overall in 2022
Matthew Morden	Defenseman	Canada	19	Hamilton, ON; selected 131st overall in 2022

== Roster ==
As of August 2, 2023.

No.	Nat.	Player	Class	Pos	Height	Weight	DoB	Hometown	Previous team	NHL rights
1	(United States)	Max Miller	Senior	G	6' 2" (1.88 m)	180 lb (82 kg)	2001-08-02	Ann Arbor, Michigan	Janesville Jets (NAHL)	—
2	(United States)	Ian Moore (C)	Junior	D	6' 3" (1.91 m)	185 lb (84 kg)	2002-01-04	Concord, Massachusetts	Chicago Steel (USHL)	ANA, 67th overall 2020
5	(United States)	Mason Langenbrunner	Sophomore	D	6' 3" (1.91 m)	179 lb (81 kg)	2002-09-14	Eden Prairie, Minnesota	Fargo Force (USHL)	BOS, 151st overall 2020
7	(United States)	Philip Tresca	Sophomore	F	6' 0" (1.83 m)	190 lb (86 kg)	2002-04-10	Newton, Massachusetts	Muskegon Lumberjacks (USHL)	—
8	(United States)	Alex Gaffney	Junior	F	5' 8" (1.73 m)	170 lb (77 kg)	2002-06-25	West Orange, New Jersey	Waterloo Black Hawks (USHL)	—
9	(United States)	Ryan Healey	Sophomore	D	6' 0" (1.83 m)	172 lb (78 kg)	2004-05-19	Hull, Massachusetts	Sioux Falls Stampede (USHL)	MIN, 121st overall 2022
10	(United States)	David Hejduk	Freshman	D	6' 0" (1.83 m)	194 lb (88 kg)	2004-01-03	Parker, Colorado	Wenatchee Wild (BCHL)	—
11	(United States)	Ryan Fine	Freshman	F	5' 9" (1.75 m)	183 lb (83 kg)	2005-03-14	Center Moriches, New York	USNTDP (USHL)	—
12	(United States)	Joe Miller	Sophomore	F	5' 9" (1.75 m)	160 lb (73 kg)	2002-09-15	Minneapolis, Minnesota	Chicago Steel (USHL)	TOR, 180th overall 2020
13	(United States)	Marek Hejduk	Sophomore	F	6' 0" (1.83 m)	184 lb (83 kg)	2004-01-03	Parker, Colorado	USNTDP (USHL)	—
14	(Canada)	Matthew Morden	Freshman	D	6' 4" (1.93 m)	203 lb (92 kg)	2004-07-29	Hamilton, Ontario	Muskegon Lumberjacks (USHL)	ARI, 131st overall 2022
15	(United States)	Luke Khozozian	Junior	F	5' 10" (1.78 m)	180 lb (82 kg)	2001-04-21	Weston, Massachusetts	East Coast Wizards (EHL)	—
18	(United States)	Michael Callow	Freshman	F	6' 4" (1.93 m)	181 lb (82 kg)	2004-01-15	Boston, Massachusetts	Muskegon Lumberjacks (USHL)	ANA, 154th overall 2022
19	(United States)	Ben MacDonald	Freshman	F	6' 0" (1.83 m)	181 lb (82 kg)	2004-02-24	Weston, Massachusetts	West Kelowna Warriors (BCHL)	SEA, 91st overall 2022
20	(United States)	Tommy Lyons	Junior	F	6' 0" (1.83 m)	185 lb (84 kg)	2000-04-01	East Falmouth, Massachusetts	Chilliwack Chiefs (BCHL)	—
21	(Canada)	Cam Johnson	Freshman	F	5' 9" (1.75 m)	146 lb (66 kg)	2004-11-28	Vancouver, British Columbia	Chicago Steel (USHL)	—
23	(United States)	Salvatore Guzzo	Freshman	F	5' 11" (1.8 m)	168 lb (76 kg)	2005-04-17	Old Tappan, New Jersey	USNTDP (USHL)	—
24	(Canada)	Jack Bar	Junior	D	6' 2" (1.88 m)	195 lb (88 kg)	2002-10-24	Newmarket, Ontario	Chicago Steel (USHL)	DAL, 138th overall 2021
25	(United States)	Peter Frates	Junior	D	5' 10" (1.78 m)	181 lb (82 kg)	2001-10-11	Needham, Massachusetts	Williams (NESCAC)	—
26	(United States)	Ryan Drkulec	Senior	F	6' 6" (1.98 m)	197 lb (89 kg)	2000-09-22	Westlake, Texas	Lone Star Brahmas (NAHL)	—
29	(United States)	Casey Severo	Sophomore	F	5' 9" (1.75 m)	177 lb (80 kg)	2001-02-01	Penfield, New York	Madison Capitols (USHL)	—
30	(Finland)	Aku Koskenvuo	Sophomore	G	6' 4" (1.93 m)	173 lb (78 kg)	2003-02-26	Espoo, Finland	HIFK U20 (U20 SM-sarja)	VAN, 137th overall 2021
33	(Canada)	Kyle Aucoin	Junior	D	6' 0" (1.83 m)	175 lb (79 kg)	2002-07-02	Ottawa, Ontario	Muskegon Lumberjacks (USHL)	DET, 156th overall 2020
35	(United States)	Derek Mullahy	Senior	G	6' 0" (1.83 m)	190 lb (86 kg)	2001-03-20	Scituate, Massachusetts	Des Moines Buccaneers (USHL)	—
43	(United States)	Christian Jimenez	Junior	D	5' 9" (1.75 m)	195 lb (88 kg)	2002-03-15	Yorktown Heights, New York	Sioux City Musketeers (USHL)	—
59	(United States)	Zakary Karpa (C)	Junior	F	6' 2" (1.88 m)	190 lb (86 kg)	2002-03-25	Newport Beach, California	Des Moines Buccaneers (USHL)	NYR, 191st overall 2022

== Standings ==
2023–24 ECAC Hockey Standings
	Conference record										Overall record					
	GP	W	L	T	OTW	OTL	SW	PTS	GF	GA	GP	W	L	T	GF	GA
#6 Quinnipiac †	22	17	4	1	0	2	0	54	99	39	39	27	10	2	160	79
#9 Cornell *	22	12	6	4	1	2	3	44	74	45	35	22	7	6	115	65
Colgate	22	13	7	2	2	2	2	43	85	68	36	16	16	4	120	112
Dartmouth	22	9	6	7	1	1	3	37	66	60	32	13	10	9	92	91
Clarkson	22	12	9	1	4	2	1	36	62	58	35	18	16	1	95	97
Union	22	9	10	3	1	1	2	32	75	75	37	16	18	3	123	121
St. Lawrence	22	8	10	4	1	1	1	29	49	64	39	14	19	6	90	118
Harvard	22	6	10	6	1	2	3	28	49	64	32	7	19	6	70	106
Princeton	22	8	11	3	4	0	2	25	70	90	30	10	16	4	89	114
Yale	22	7	13	2	1	2	1	25	46	57	30	10	18	2	63	91
Brown	22	6	14	2	2	3	1	22	43	69	30	8	19	3	61	98
Rensselaer	22	6	13	3	0	0	0	21	58	89	37	10	23	4	93	150
Championship: March 23, 2024 † indicates conference regular season champion (Cleary Cup) * indicates conference tournament champion (Whitelaw Cup); Rankings: USCHO.com Top 20 Poll

== Schedule and results ==
Date	Time	Opponent^{#}	Rank^{#}	Site	TV	Decision	Result	Attendance	Record
Regular Season
October 27	7:00 pm	at Dartmouth	#17	Thompson Arena • Hanover, New Hampshire	ESPN+	Mullahy	T 1–1 ^{SOW}	1,422	0–0–1 (0–0–1)
November 3	7:00 pm	Princeton	#19	Bright-Landry Hockey Center • Boston, Massachusetts	ESPN+	Koskenvuo	T 4–4 ^{SOL}	150	0–0–2 (0–0–2)
November 4	7:00 pm	#8 Quinnipiac	#19	Bright-Landry Hockey Center • Boston, Massachusetts	ESPN+	Mullahy	L 0–6 ^{SOL}	2,194	0–1–2 (0–1–2)
November 10	7:00 pm	at Colgate		Class of 1965 Arena • Hamilton, New York	ESPN+	Koskenvuo	T 2–2 ^{SOL}	1,241	0–1–3 (0–1–3)
November 11	7:00 pm	at #7 Cornell		Lynah Rink • Ithaca, New York (Rivalry)	ESPN+	Mullahy	W 3–2	4,361	1–1–3 (1–1–3)
November 24	4:00 pm	#11 Massachusetts*		Bright-Landry Hockey Center • Boston, Massachusetts	ESPN+, NESN	Koskenvuo	L 5–6	—	1–2–3
November 26	1:00 pm	#2 Boston College*		Bright-Landry Hockey Center • Boston, Massachusetts	ESPN+	Mullahy	L 1–4	2,903	1–3–3
December 1	7:00 pm	at Clarkson		Cheel Arena • Potsdam, New York	ESPN+	Mullahy	L 0–3	2,360	1–4–3 (1–2–3)
December 2	7:00 pm	at St. Lawrence		Appleton Arena • Canton, New York	ESPN+	Koskenvuo	L 0–2	1,110	1–5–3 (1–3–3)
December 30	7:00 pm	at Princeton		Hobey Baker Memorial Rink • Princeton, New Jersey	ESPN+	Mullahy	L 2–5	2,453	1–6–3 (1–4–3)
December 31	7:00 pm	at Connecticut*		Toscano Family Ice Forum • Storrs, Connecticut	ESPN+	Koskenvuo	L 2–4	2,630	1–7–3
Desert Hockey Classic
January 5	9:00 pm	at #12 Arizona State*		Mullett Arena • Tempe, Arizona (Desert Hockey Semifinal)		Mullahy	L 2–5	5,007	1–8–3
January 6	5:30 pm	vs. Massachusetts Lowell*		Mullett Arena • Tempe, Arizona (Desert Hockey Consolation Game)		Koskenvuo	L 4–7	4,903	1–9–3
January 12	7:00 pm	at Brown		Meehan Auditorium • Providence, Rhode Island	ESPN+	Mullahy	L 3–5	1,112	1–10–3 (1–5–3)
January 13	7:00 pm	at Yale		Ingalls Rink • New Haven, Connecticut (Rivalry)	ESPN+	Koskenvuo	W 1–0	2,806	2–10–3 (2–5–3)
January 19	7:00 pm	Rensselaer		Bright-Landry Hockey Center • Boston, Massachusetts	ESPN+	Koskenvuo	W 6–3	1,905	3–10–3 (3–5–3)
January 20	7:00 pm	Union		Bright-Landry Hockey Center • Boston, Massachusetts	ESPN+	Mullahy	L 4–5	3,095	3–11–3 (3–6–3)
January 26	7:00 pm	#13 Cornell		Bright-Landry Hockey Center • Boston, Massachusetts (Rivalry)	ESPN+	Mullahy	L 0–2	3,095	3–12–3 (3–7–3)
January 27	7:00 pm	Colgate		Bright-Landry Hockey Center • Boston, Massachusetts	ESPN+	Koskenvuo	W 6–3	3,095	4–12–3 (4–7–3)
February 2	7:00 pm	at #7 Quinnipiac		M&T Bank Arena • Hamden, Connecticut	ESPN+	Koskenvuo	L 1–2	3,245	4–13–3 (4–8–3)
Beanpot
February 5	5:00 pm	vs. Northeastern*		TD Garden • Boston, Massachusetts (Beanpot Semifinal)	NESN	Mullahy	L 2–3 ^{OT}	17,850	4–14–3
February 9	7:00 pm	Dartmouth		Bright-Landry Hockey Center • Boston, Massachusetts	ESPN+	Koskenvuo	T 5–5 ^{SOW}	2,120	4–14–4 (4–8–4)
February 12	4:30 pm	vs. #1 Boston College*		TD Garden • Boston, Massachusetts (Beanpot Consolation Game)	NESN	Mullahy	L 0–5	—	4–15–4
February 16	7:00 pm	St. Lawrence		Bright-Landry Hockey Center • Boston, Massachusetts	ESPN+	Mullahy	W 2–1	1,888	5–15–4 (5–8–4)
February 17	7:00 pm	Clarkson		Bright-Landry Hockey Center • Boston, Massachusetts	ESPN+	Mullahy	L 2–3	1,682	5–16–4 (5–9–4)
February 23	7:00 pm	at Union		Achilles Rink • Schenectady, New York	ESPN+	Mullahy	L 2–6	2,197	5–17–4 (5–10–4)
February 24	7:00 pm	at Rensselaer		Houston Field House • Troy, New York	ESPN+	Koskenvuo	T 2–2 ^{SOW}	2,465	5–17–5 (5–10–5)
March 1	7:00 pm	Yale		Bright-Landry Hockey Center • Boston, Massachusetts (Rivalry)	ESPN+	Koskenvuo	W 2–1	3,095	6–17–5 (6–10–5)
March 2	7:00 pm	Brown		Bright-Landry Hockey Center • Boston, Massachusetts	ESPN+	Mullahy	T 1–1 ^{SOL}	1,697	6–17–6 (6–10–6)
ECAC Hockey Tournament
March 8	7:00 pm	Princeton*		Bright-Landry Hockey Center • Boston, Massachusetts (First Round)	ESPN+	Koskenvuo	W 1–0	1,482	7–17–6
March 15	7:00 pm	at #15 Cornell*		Lynah Rink • Ithaca, New York (Quarterfinal Game 1, Rivalry)	ESPN+	Koskenvuo	L 3–4	4,267	7–18–6
March 16	7:00 pm	at #15 Cornell*		Lynah Rink • Ithaca, New York (Quarterfinal Game 2, Rivalry)	ESPN+	Mullahy	L 1–4	4,267	7–19–6
*Non-conference game. ^{#}Rankings from USCHO.com Poll. All times are in Eastern Time. Source:

== Scoring statistics ==
Name	Position	Games	Goals	Assists	Points	PIM
Joe Miller	C	32	13	14	27	8
Ryan Healey	D	29	9	13	22	12
Cam Johnson	C	32	4	12	16	4
Michael Callow	RW	32	3	12	15	0
Ben MacDonald	C	32	5	10	15	36
Casey Severo	C	32	8	5	13	6
Ryan Fine	F	32	5	5	10	12
Alex Gaffney	C	31	8	2	10	0
Ian Moore	D	21	3	5	8	10
Zakary Karpa	C	31	4	4	8	6
Marek Hejduk	F	32	5	2	7	29
Philip Tresca	C	16	0	7	7	6
Jack Bar	D	27	1	5	6	12
Mason Langenbrunner	D	32	0	5	5	8
Salvatore Guzzo	F	29	0	4	4	10
Matthew Morden	D	32	1	2	3	12
Ryan Drkulec	F	27	1	2	3	6
David Hejduk	D	22	0	1	1	8
Kyle Aucoin	D	8	0	1	1	6
Derek Mullahy	G	17	0	1	1	0
Christian Jimenez	D	18	0	1	1	12
Peter Frates	D	1	0	0	0	0
Luke Khozozian	F	12	0	0	0	19
Aku Koskenvuo	G	17	0	0	0	0
Max Miller	G	1	0	0	0	2
Tommy Lyons	F	29	0	0	0	2
Total			70	113	183	224

== Goaltending statistics ==
Name	Games	Minutes	Wins	Losses	Ties	Goals against	Saves	Shut outs	SV %	GAA
Derek Mullahy	19	973:11	2	13	2	51	442	0	.897	3.14
Max Miller	3	3:02	0	0	0	0	1	0	1.000	0.00
Aku Koskenvuo	18	957:04	5	6	4	47	477	2	.910	2.95
Empty Net	-	25:32	-	-	-	8	-	-	-	-
Total	32	1958:49	7	19	6	106	920	2	.897	3.25

== Rankings ==
Poll	Week																										
Poll	Pre	1	2	3	4	5	6	7	8	9	10	11	12	13	14	15	16	17	18	19	20	21	22	23	24	25	26 (Final)
USCHO.com	15	16	15	17	19	NR	NR	NR	NR	NR	NR	–	NR	NR	NR	NR	NR	NR	NR	NR	NR	NR	NR	NR	NR	–	NR
USA Hockey	13	16	15	13	15	20	20	20	NR	NR	NR	NR	–	NR	NR	NR	NR	NR	NR	NR	NR	NR	NR	NR	NR	NR	NR

Note: USCHO did not release a poll in weeks 11 and 25.
Note: USA Hockey did not release a poll in week 12.

== Awards and honors ==
Player	Award	Ref
Joe Miller	ECAC Hockey First Team	

== 2024 NHL entry draft ==
Round	Pick	Player	NHL team
4	107	Heikki Ruohonen ^{†}	Philadelphia Flyers
6	166	Ben Merrill ^{†}	Montreal Canadiens
6	179	Xavier Veilleux ^{†}	New York Islanders

† incoming freshman
