= 2023–24 Dartmouth Big Green men's ice hockey season =

- Conference: 4th ECAC Hockey
- Home ice: Thompson Arena

Rankings
- USCHO: NR
- USA Hockey: NR

Record
- Overall: 13–10–9
- Conference: 9–6–7
- Home: 9–3–4
- Road: 4–6–5
- Neutral: 0–1–0

Coaches and captains
- Head coach: Reid Cashman
- Assistant coaches: Jason Tapp; Troy Thibodeau
- Captain: Sean Chisholm
- Alternate captain(s): Joey Musa; Steven Townley; Josh Waters

The 2023–24 Dartmouth Big Green Men's ice hockey season was the 117th season of play for the program and the 62nd in ECAC Hockey. The Big Green represented Dartmouth College, played their home games at the Thompson Arena and were coached by Reid Cashman in his 3rd season.

== Season ==
Dartmouth started the year in a rather peculiar position. Though a relatively low-scoring team, the Big Green saw a vast improvement by their defense and, perhaps more importantly, their starting goaltender Cooper Black. Inasmuch, the team found it difficult to win games but they refused to surrender to their opponents. In the first 11 games of the year, Dartmouth tied more than half and went into the winter break as a relative unknown.

The team returned with the annual Ledyard Bank Classic but the time off appeared to have softened the defense. Dartmouth went 2–4 coming out of the break and appeared to be heading towards another losing season. In late January, however, things began to change. Sophomore Luke Haymes, who had been one of the better forwards already, caught fire. Beginning with the match against Rensselaer on January 20, he ran roughshod over ECAC defenses and scored 24 points (14 goals 10 assists) in the final 12 games of the regular season. His offensive explosion helped turn Dartmouth's season around and allowed the Big Green to go 7–2–3 down the stretch. Dartmouth climbed their way up the conference standings and finished 1 point ahead of Clarkson for 4th place.

The streak not only gave the team home ice but provided the Greens with a bye into the quarterfinal round. The week off appeared to end Haymes' hot streak but the rest of the team picked up the pace and ensured that Dartmouth had enough scoring to dispatch Union in straight sets. In the semifinals, Dartmouth met Cornell and looked to have the measure of the Big Red for the first two periods. The Big Green had a 3–1 lead with 20 minutes to play but had to kill off a penalty at the start of the period. Unfortunately, Cornell was able to convert on their only man-advantage of the match and that goal seemed to spark the Reds. Cornell scored two more goals in the middle of the period to take the lead and then held off Dartmouth with their stingy defense. In desperation, Cooper Black was pulled for an extra attacker but that only allowed Cornell to score twice into an empty net to turn the match into a rout.

Despite the collapse at the end, Dartmouth had finished the year with a winning record for the first time in eight years and posted a dramatic turnaround going from 12th to 4th in the conference standings.

== Departures ==
Player	Position	Nationality	Cause
Troy Burkhart	Goaltender	United States	Graduation (retired)
Jack Cameron	Defenseman	Canada	Graduation (retired)
Tyler Campbell	Forward	Canada	Graduation (retired)
Mark Gallant	Forward	United States	Graduation (retired)
Matt Hubbarde	Forward	Canada	Transferred to Providence
Sean Keohan	Defenseman	United States	Graduation (retired)
Ryan Lovett	Forward	United States	Left program (retired)
Tanner Palocsik	Defenseman	United States	Graduate transfer to Penn State
Brock Paul	Defenseman	United States	Graduation (retired)
Nick Unruh	Forward	Canada	Left program (retired)

== Recruiting ==
Player	Position	Nationality	Age	Notes
Eric Charpentier	Defenseman	United States	21	Silver Spring, MD
Roan Clarke	Goaltender	Canada	20	Cloverdale, BC
Owen Desilets	Defenseman	Canada	19	Airdrie, AB
C. J. Foley	Defenseman	United States	19	Hanover, MA
Matt Fusco	Defenseman	United States	20	Westwood, MA
Nikita Nikora	Forward	Russia	19	St. Petersburg, RUS
Oskari Vuorio	Forward	Finland	19	Espoo, FIN

== Roster ==
As of September 19, 2023.

No.	Nat.	Player	Class	Pos	Height	Weight	DoB	Hometown	Previous team	NHL rights
1	(United States)	Mikey Roberts	Sophomore	G	6' 0" (1.83 m)	175 lb (79 kg)	2002-12-25	Wilton, Connecticut	Taft School (USHS–CT)	—
2	(United States)	Eric Charpentier	Freshman	D	6' 3" (1.91 m)	205 lb (93 kg)	2002-06-10	Silver Spring, Maryland	New Jersey Titans (NAHL)	—
3	(United States)	John Fusco	Junior	D	5' 10" (1.78 m)	190 lb (86 kg)	2001-06-13	Westwood, Massachusetts	Harvard (ECAC)	TOR, 189th overall 2020
4	(United States)	C. J. Foley	Freshman	D	5' 11" (1.8 m)	174 lb (79 kg)	2004-02-11	Hanover, Massachusetts	Salmon Arm Silverbacks (BCHL)	—
5	(Canada)	Tucker McRae	Sophomore	D	6' 0" (1.83 m)	190 lb (86 kg)	2001-04-11	Calgary, Alberta	Okotoks Oilers (AJHL)	—
6	(United States)	Matt Fusco	Freshman	D	5' 11" (1.8 m)	195 lb (88 kg)	2003-03-07	Westwood, Massachusetts	West Kelowna Warriors (BCHL)	—
7	(Russia)	Nikita Nikora	Freshman	F	5' 10" (1.78 m)	170 lb (77 kg)	2004-01-21	St. Petersburg, Russia	Springfield Jr. Blues (NAHL)	—
8	(United States)	Joey Musa (A)	Senior	F	5' 9" (1.75 m)	160 lb (73 kg)	2000-06-11	Orange Park, Florida	Langley Rivermen (BCHL)	—
10	(United States)	Ryan Sorkin	Senior	F	5' 10" (1.78 m)	175 lb (79 kg)	2001-06-13	Chicago, Illinois	Lone Star Brahmas (NAHL)	—
14	(United States)	Steven Townley (A)	Junior	F	6' 2" (1.88 m)	205 lb (93 kg)	2000-06-13	Woodstock, Vermont	Jersey Hitmen (NCDC)	—
15	(Canada)	Cam MacDonald	Sophomore	F	5' 9" (1.75 m)	185 lb (84 kg)	2002-03-08	Surrey, British Columbia	Vernon Vipers (BCHL)	—
17	(United States)	Braiden Dorfman	Junior	F	6' 1" (1.85 m)	185 lb (84 kg)	2000-08-09	Nashville, Tennessee	Shreveport Mudbugs (NAHL)	—
18	(United States)	Josh Waters (A)	Senior	F	5' 11" (1.8 m)	175 lb (79 kg)	2000-01-23	Collegeville, Pennsylvania	Maryland Black Bears (NAHL)	—
19	(Canada)	Sean Chisholm (C)	Junior	F	6' 1" (1.85 m)	190 lb (86 kg)	2001-01-26	Caledonia, Ontario	Brooks Bandits (AJHL)	—
20	(United States)	Cooper Flinton	Sophomore	F	6' 2" (1.88 m)	205 lb (93 kg)	2003-08-16	Auburn, New Hampshire	Cedar Rapids RoughRiders (USHL)	TBL, 211th overall 2021
22	(Norway)	Trym Løkkeberg	Junior	F	6' 2" (1.88 m)	210 lb (95 kg)	2001-07-23	Fredrikstad, Norway	Mora J20 (J20 Nationell)	—
23	(United States)	Ian Pierce	Junior	D	5' 10" (1.78 m)	190 lb (86 kg)	2001-01-24	Edgewater, New Jersey	Dubuque Fighting Saints (USHL)	—
24	(Finland)	Oskari Vuorio	Freshman	F	5' 9" (1.75 m)	175 lb (79 kg)	2004-05-06	Espoo, Finland	Jokerit U20 (U20 SM-sarja)	—
27	(Canada)	Brady MacDonald	Junior	D	6' 4" (1.93 m)	190 lb (86 kg)	2000-01-24	Union, Ontario	Victoria Grizzlies (BCHL)	—
28	(Canada)	Luke Haymes	Sophomore	F	6' 1" (1.85 m)	192 lb (87 kg)	2003-07-28	Ottawa, Ontario	Cowichan Valley Capitals (BCHL)	—
31	(United States)	Cooper Black	Sophomore	G	6' 9" (2.06 m)	240 lb (109 kg)	2001-06-14	Alpena, Michigan	Nanaimo Clippers (BCHL)	—
32	(Canada)	Roan Clarke	Freshman	G	6' 3" (1.91 m)	190 lb (86 kg)	2003-08-23	Cloverdale, British Columbia	Vernon Vipers (BCHL)	—
43	(Canada)	Owen Desilets	Freshman	D	6' 1" (1.85 m)	175 lb (79 kg)	2004-02-03	Airdrie, Alberta	Alberni Valley Bulldogs (BCHL)	—
68	(Canada)	Nate Morgan	Junior	F	5' 10" (1.78 m)	190 lb (86 kg)	2002-02-08	Calgary, Alberta	Salmon Arm Silverbacks (BCHL)	—
95	(United States)	Alex Krause	Sophomore	F	6' 1" (1.85 m)	190 lb (86 kg)	2001-07-22	Calabasas, California	Northeast Generals (NAHL)	—

== Standings ==
2023–24 ECAC Hockey Standings
	Conference record										Overall record					
	GP	W	L	T	OTW	OTL	SW	PTS	GF	GA	GP	W	L	T	GF	GA
#6 Quinnipiac †	22	17	4	1	0	2	0	54	99	39	39	27	10	2	160	79
#9 Cornell *	22	12	6	4	1	2	3	44	74	45	35	22	7	6	115	65
Colgate	22	13	7	2	2	2	2	43	85	68	36	16	16	4	120	112
Dartmouth	22	9	6	7	1	1	3	37	66	60	32	13	10	9	92	91
Clarkson	22	12	9	1	4	2	1	36	62	58	35	18	16	1	95	97
Union	22	9	10	3	1	1	2	32	75	75	37	16	18	3	123	121
St. Lawrence	22	8	10	4	1	1	1	29	49	64	39	14	19	6	90	118
Harvard	22	6	10	6	1	2	3	28	49	64	32	7	19	6	70	106
Princeton	22	8	11	3	4	0	2	25	70	90	30	10	16	4	89	114
Yale	22	7	13	2	1	2	1	25	46	57	30	10	18	2	63	91
Brown	22	6	14	2	2	3	1	22	43	69	30	8	19	3	61	98
Rensselaer	22	6	13	3	0	0	0	21	58	89	37	10	23	4	93	150
Championship: March 23, 2024 † indicates conference regular season champion (Cleary Cup) * indicates conference tournament champion (Whitelaw Cup); Rankings: USCHO.com Top 20 Poll

== Schedule and results ==
Date	Time	Opponent^{#}	Rank^{#}	Site	TV	Decision	Result	Attendance	Record
Exhibition
October 8	4:00 pm	Massachusetts*		Thompson Arena • Hanover, New Hampshire (Exhibition)			L 1–5		
October 15	6:00 pm	USNTDP*		Thompson Arena • Hanover, New Hampshire (Exhibition)		Black	W 7–2	514	
Regular Season
October 27	7:00 pm	#17 Harvard		Thompson Arena • Hanover, New Hampshire	ESPN+	Black	T 1–1 ^{SOL}	1,422	0–0–1 (0–0–1)
October 28	7:00 pm	at New Hampshire*		Whittemore Center • Durham, New Hampshire (Rivalry)	ESPN+	Black	L 1–3	4,258	0–1–1
November 3	7:00 pm	#8 Quinnipiac		Thompson Arena • Hanover, New Hampshire	ESPN+	Black	T 2–2 ^{SOW}	1,113	0–1–2 (0–0–2)
November 4	7:00 pm	Princeton		Thompson Arena • Hanover, New Hampshire	ESPN+	Black	W 5–4	2,839	1–1–2 (1–0–2)
November 10	7:00 pm	at #7 Cornell		Lynah Rink • Ithaca, New York	ESPN+	Black	T 2–2 ^{SOL}	4,361	1–1–3 (1–0–3)
November 11	7:00 pm	at Colgate		Class of 1965 Arena • Hamilton, New York	ESPN+	Black	W 3–2	987	2–1–3 (2–0–3)
November 25	3:00 pm	vs. Connecticut*		XL Center • Hartford, Connecticut	ESPN+	Clarke	L 1–6	3,582	2–2–3
December 1	7:00 pm	at St. Lawrence		Appleton Arena • Canton, New York	ESPN+	Black	L 1–3	1,012	2–3–3 (2–1–3)
December 1	7:00 pm	at Clarkson		Cheel Arena • Potsdam, New York	ESPN+	Black	T 2–2 ^{SOL}	2,321	2–3–4 (2–1–4)
December 8	9:00 pm	at #12 Arizona State*		Mullett Arena • Tempe, Arizona		Black	T 4–4 ^{OT}	4,781	2–3–5
December 9	7:00 pm	at #12 Arizona State*		Mullett Arena • Tempe, Arizona		Black	T 1–1 ^{OT}	4,837	2–3–6
Ledyard Bank Classic
December 29	7:30 pm	Lake Superior State*		Thompson Arena • Hanover, New Hampshire (Ledyard Bank Semifinal)	ESPN+	Black	W 4–0	2,555	3–3–6
December 30	7:30 pm	#8 Maine*		Thompson Arena • Hanover, New Hampshire (Ledyard Bank Championship)	ESPN+	Black	L 1–5	2,886	3–4–6
January 6	6:00 pm	Vermont*		Thompson Arena • Hanover, New Hampshire	ESPN+	Black	W 4–3	3,335	4–4–6
January 12	7:00 pm	at Yale		Ingalls Rink • New Haven, Connecticut	ESPN+	Black	L 0–5	1,406	4–5–6 (2–2–4)
January 13	7:00 pm	at Brown		Meehan Auditorium • Providence, Rhode Island	ESPN+	Black	L 1–2	672	4–6–6 (2–3–4)
January 19	7:00 pm	Union		Thompson Arena • Hanover, New Hampshire	ESPN+	Clarke	L 1–5	1,429	4–7–6 (2–4–4)
January 20	7:00 pm	Rensselaer		Thompson Arena • Hanover, New Hampshire	ESPN+	Black	W 6–2	1,578	5–7–6 (3–4–4)
January 26	7:00 pm	Colgate		Thompson Arena • Hanover, New Hampshire	ESPN+	Black	L 3–4 ^{OT}	1,374	5–8–6 (3–5–4)
January 27	7:00 pm	#13 Cornell		Thompson Arena • Hanover, New Hampshire	ESPN+	Black	T 2–2 ^{SOW}	2,296	5–8–7 (3–5–5)
February 2	7:00 pm	at Princeton		Hobey Baker Memorial Rink • Princeton, New Jersey	ESPN+	Black	W 5–1	1,593	6–8–7 (4–5–5)
February 3	7:00 pm	at #7 Quinnipiac		M&T Bank Arena • Hamden, Connecticut	ESPN+	Black	L 1–5	3,211	6–9–7 (4–6–5)
February 9	7:00 pm	at Harvard		Bright-Landry Hockey Center • Boston, Massachusetts	ESPN+	Black	T 5–5 ^{SOL}	2,120	6–9–8 (4–6–6)
February 16	7:00 pm	Clarkson		Thompson Arena • Hanover, New Hampshire	ESPN+	Black	W 3–0	1,694	7–9–8 (5–6–6)
February 17	7:00 pm	St. Lawrence		Thompson Arena • Hanover, New Hampshire	ESPN+	Black	T 4–4 ^{SOW}	2,253	7–9–9 (5–6–7)
February 23	7:00 pm	at Rensselaer		Houston Field House • Troy, New York	ESPN+	Black	W 5–1	2,186	8–9–9 (6–6–7)
February 24	7:00 pm	at Union		Achilles Rink • Schenectady, New York	ESPN+	Black	W 5–4	2,024	9–9–9 (7–6–7)
March 1	7:00 pm	Brown		Thompson Arena • Hanover, New Hampshire	ESPN+	Black	W 5–3	1,615	10–9–9 (8–6–7)
March 2	7:00 pm	Yale		Thompson Arena • Hanover, New Hampshire	ESPN+	Black	W 4–1	2,278	11–9–9 (9–6–7)
ECAC Hockey Tournament
March 15	7:00 pm	Union*		Thompson Arena • Hanover, New Hampshire (Quarterfinal Game 1)	ESPN+	Black	W 3–1	1,625	12–9–9
March 16	7:00 pm	Union*		Thompson Arena • Hanover, New Hampshire (Quarterfinal Game 2)	ESPN+	Black	W 4–2	2,007	13–9–9
March 22	7:30 pm	vs. #14 Cornell*		Herb Brooks Arena • Lake Placid, New York (Semifinal)	ESPN+	Black	L 3–6	4,015	13–10–9
*Non-conference game. ^{#}Rankings from USCHO.com Poll. All times are in Eastern Time. Source:

== Scoring statistics ==
Name	Position	Games	Goals	Assists	Points	PIM
Luke Haymes	C	31	18	18	36	12
Cooper Flinton	LW	30	15	10	25	25
C. J. Foley	D	32	5	15	20	10
Nikita Nikora	C/W	25	3	17	20	2
Sean Chisholm	C/LW	28	8	9	17	11
Braiden Dorfman	F	29	8	9	17	36
John Fusco	D	32	7	10	17	19
Joey Musa	F	32	6	11	17	18
Cam MacDonald	F	31	4	9	13	8
Eric Charpentier	D	32	4	7	11	25
Matt Fusco	D	28	3	8	11	10
Ian Pierce	D	21	2	9	11	8
Tucker McRae	D	27	3	4	7	14
Steven Townley	F	32	2	4	6	10
Nate Morgan	F	28	1	4	5	6
Oskari Vuorio	C	29	0	5	5	4
Ryan Sorkin	F	31	1	3	4	32
Owen Desilets	D	22	0	4	4	4
Alex Krause	F	18	1	1	2	15
Josh Waters	F	24	0	1	1	16
Cooper Black	G	30	0	1	1	0
Trym Løkkeberg	C	31	1	0	1	8
Mikey Roberts	G	1	0	0	0	0
Roan Clarke	G	4	0	0	0	0
Total			92	159	251	303

== Goaltending statistics ==
Name	Games	Minutes	Wins	Losses	Ties	Goals against	Saves	Shut outs	SV %	GAA
Cooper Black	30	1769:01	13	8	8	76	765	2	.910	2.58
Mikey Roberts	1	3:52	0	0	0	0	1	0	1.000	0.00
Roan Clarke	4	183:00	0	2	1	12	74	0	.860	3.93
Empty Net	-	16:35	-	-	-	3	-	-	-	-
Total	32	1972:28	13	10	9	91	840	2	.902	2.77

== Rankings ==
Poll	Week																										
Poll	Pre	1	2	3	4	5	6	7	8	9	10	11	12	13	14	15	16	17	18	19	20	21	22	23	24	25	26 (Final)
USCHO.com	NR	NR	NR	NR	NR	NR	NR	NR	NR	NR	NR	–	NR	NR	NR	NR	NR	NR	NR	NR	NR	NR	NR	NR	NR	–	NR
USA Hockey	NR	NR	NR	NR	NR	NR	NR	NR	NR	NR	NR	NR	–	NR	NR	NR	NR	NR	NR	NR	NR	NR	NR	NR	NR	NR	NR

Note: USCHO did not release a poll in weeks 11 and 25.
Note: USA Hockey did not release a poll in week 12.

== Awards and honors ==
Player	Award	Ref
C. J. Foley	ECAC Hockey Rookie of the Year	
Reid Cashman	Tim Taylor Award	
Luke Haymes	ECAC Hockey First Team	
Cooper Black	ECAC Hockey Second Team	
C. J. Foley	ECAC Hockey Third Team	
C. J. Foley	ECAC Hockey Rookie Team	
John Fusco	ECAC Hockey All-Tournament Team	
