= 2023–24 Yale Bulldogs men's ice hockey season =

College ice hockey season

- Conference: T–9th ECAC Hockey
- Home ice: Ingalls Rink

Rankings
- USCHO: NR
- USA Hockey: NR

Record
- Overall: 10–18–2
- Conference: 7–13–2
- Home: 6–8–1
- Road: 3–10–1
- Neutral: 1–0–0

Coaches and captains
- Head coach: Keith Allain
- Assistant coaches: Joe Howe; Rob O'Gara; Bill Maniscalco
- Captain: Reilly Connors

The 2023–24 Yale Bulldogs Men's ice hockey season was the 128th season of play for the program and the 62nd in ECAC Hockey. The Bulldogs represented Yale University, played their home games at the Ingalls Rink and were coached by Keith Allain in his 17th season.

== Season ==
Though Yale began the season with a win, the team had a rather poor start by losing eight of the next nine games. The two main causes for the defeats was a subpar goaltending performance from returning starter Nathan Reid and an almost total lack of offense. In the first five weeks of their season, Yale was limited to less than 2 goals in more than half of their games and had only managed to get 30 shots on goal in one contest. The team wasn't able to get on track until mid-December when both the offense and defense began improving. After struggling through his first few starts, Jack Stark grew accustomed to the college game and the rest of the team responded in kind.

After returning form the winter break, the offense came to life and won three games in a row to put the Bulldogs right in the middle of the ECAC standings. Unfortunately, scoring remained inconsistent and the team lost the next four games to put them back near the bottom of the conference. A brief at the start of February put the Elis into contention for a home stand in the postseason but Yale went winless in its final five games and sentenced the team to travelling for the playoff matches.

In the middle of another cold spell for their offense, Yale met St. Lawrence for a First Round matchup. While the Elis had no trouble getting the puck on net, they were faced with a stellar performance from the Saints' netminder. Yale scored twice but Stark was unable to match his counterpart and the Elis fell 2–4 to end their season.

== Departures ==
| Player | Position | Nationality | Cause |
|---|---|---|---|
| Ryan Carmichael | Defenseman/Forward | United States | Graduation (retired) |
| Cole Donhauser | Forward | United States | Graduation (signed with Coventry Blaze) |
| Connor Hopkins | Goaltender | United States | Graduate transfer to Northeastern |
| Quinton Ong | Forward | Canada | Graduation (retired) |
| Hayden Rowan | Forward | United States | Graduation (retired) |
| Brandon Tabakin | Defenseman | United States | Graduate transfer to Arizona State |
| Michael Young | Defenseman | United States | Graduation (signed with Anglet Hormadi Élite) |

== Recruiting ==
| Player | Position | Nationality | Age | Notes |
|---|---|---|---|---|
| David Andreychuk | Forward | United States | 21 | Los Angeles, CA |
| Rhys Bentham | Defenseman | Canada | 21 | Calgary, AB |
| Owen Forester | Defenseman | Canada | 20 | Mississauga, ON |
| Iisai Pesonen | Forward | Finland | 19 | Kuopio, FIN |
| Will Richter | Forward | United States | 19 | Greenwich, CT |
| Jack Stark | Goaltender | Canada | 20 | Chaska, MN |
| Seiya Tanaka-Campbell | Forward | Canada | 20 | Mill Bay, BC |

== Roster ==
As of September 20, 2023.

| No. | Nat. | Player | Class | Pos | Height | Weight | DoB | Hometown | Previous team | NHL rights |
|---|---|---|---|---|---|---|---|---|---|---|
| 1 | (United States) | Jack Stark | Freshman | G | 5' 9" (1.75 m) | 146 lb (66 kg) | 2003-06-19 | Chaska, Minnesota | Chicago Steel (USHL) | — |
| 2 | (United States) | Bayard Hall | Sophomore | D | 6' 1" (1.85 m) | 176 lb (80 kg) | 2002-08-16 | Oldwick, New Jersey | Youngstown Phantoms (USHL) | — |
| 3 | (United States) | David Andreychuk | Freshman | F | 6' 1" (1.85 m) | 190 lb (86 kg) | 2002-04-02 | Los Angeles, California | Northeast Generals (NAHL) | — |
| 4 | (United States) | Jason Marsella | Sophomore | D | 5' 11" (1.8 m) | 193 lb (88 kg) | 2002-11-20 | Greenwich, Connecticut | Powell River Kings (BCHL) | — |
| 5 | (United States) | Dylan Herzog | Junior | D | 6' 1" (1.85 m) | 200 lb (91 kg) | 2001-01-09 | Auburn, Washington | Dubuque Fighting Saints (USHL) | — |
| 6 | (United States) | Connor Sullivan | Junior | D | 5' 11" (1.8 m) | 180 lb (82 kg) | 2000-09-07 | Plymouth, Massachusetts | Islanders Hockey Club (USPHL) | — |
| 7 | (United States) | Tucker Hartmann | Sophomore | D | 5' 11" (1.8 m) | 174 lb (79 kg) | 2002-04-04 | Southborough, Massachusetts | Salmon Arm Silverbacks (BCHL) | — |
| 8 | (Canada) | Ryan Conroy | Senior | D | 5' 9" (1.75 m) | 175 lb (79 kg) | 2001-02-06 | Chestermere, Alberta | Omaha Lancers (USHL) | — |
| 9 | (United States) | Henry Wagner | Senior | F | 5' 9" (1.75 m) | 170 lb (77 kg) | 2001-05-11 | St. Louis, Missouri | Connecticut Jr. Rangers (NCDC) | — |
| 10 | (United States) | Reilly Connors (C) | Senior | F | 6' 1" (1.85 m) | 190 lb (86 kg) | 2000-03-17 | Madison, Connecticut | Connecticut Jr. Rangers (NCDC) | — |
| 11 | (United States) | Niklas Allain | Senior | F | 6' 2" (1.88 m) | 180 lb (82 kg) | 1999-09-08 | North Branford, Connecticut | Boston Junior Bruins (NCDC) | — |
| 12 | (United States) | Will Richter | Freshman | F | 6' 1" (1.85 m) | 172 lb (78 kg) | 2004-08-20 | Greenwich, Connecticut | Penticton Vees (BCHL) | — |
| 13 | (Finland) | Iisai Pesonen | Freshman | F | 5' 10" (1.78 m) | 150 lb (68 kg) | 2004-02-20 | Kuopio, Finland | KalPa U20 (U20 SM-sarja) | — |
| 14 | (United States) | Ryan Stevens | Senior | F | 6' 0" (1.83 m) | 185 lb (84 kg) | 2000-03-04 | Duxbury, Massachusetts | South Shore Kings (NCDC) | — |
| 15 | (Canada) | Kalen Szeto | Sophomore | F | 5' 7" (1.7 m) | 155 lb (70 kg) | 2002-10-12 | Vancouver, British Columbia | Victoria Grizzlies (BCHL) | — |
| 16 | (United States) | Teddy Wooding | Senior | F | 6' 0" (1.83 m) | 190 lb (86 kg) | 1999-12-30 | Wrentham, Massachusetts | Vernon Vipers (BCHL) | — |
| 17 | (United States) | William Dineen | Junior | F | 6' 2" (1.88 m) | 195 lb (88 kg) | 2000-11-17 | Lake George, New York | Sioux Falls Stampede (USHL) | — |
| 18 | (Canada) | Seiya Tanaka-Campbell | Freshman | F | 5' 9" (1.75 m) | 170 lb (77 kg) | 2003-02-12 | Mill Bay, British Columbia | Vernon Vipers (BCHL) | — |
| 19 | (Canada) | JoJo Tanaka-Campbell | Sophomore | F | 5' 11" (1.8 m) | 185 lb (84 kg) | 2001-01-11 | Mill Bay, British Columbia | Vernon Vipers (BCHL) | — |
| 20 | (Canada) | Owen Forester | Freshman | D | 5' 10" (1.78 m) | 185 lb (84 kg) | 2003-06-17 | Mississauga, Ontario | Milton Menace (OJHL) | — |
| 21 | (United States) | Briggs Gammill | Junior | F | 5' 10" (1.78 m) | 175 lb (79 kg) | 2001-05-09 | New Canaan, Connecticut | Connecticut Jr. Rangers (NCDC) | — |
| 22 | (Canada) | Rhys Bentham | Freshman | D | 5' 10" (1.78 m) | 172 lb (78 kg) | 2002-05-15 | Calgary, Alberta | Cranbrook Bucks (BCHL) | — |
| 24 | (United States) | David Chen | Sophomore | F | 6' 0" (1.83 m) | 172 lb (78 kg) | 2003-04-01 | Livingston, New Jersey | Cedar Rapids RoughRiders (USHL) | — |
| 25 | (Canada) | Kieran O'Hearn | Junior | D | 6' 3" (1.91 m) | 200 lb (91 kg) | 2000-05-13 | North Delta, British Columbia | Surrey Eagles (BCHL) | — |
| 26 | (Canada) | Elan Bar-Lev-Wise | Sophomore | F | 6' 0" (1.83 m) | 190 lb (86 kg) | 2001-02-01 | Vancouver, British Columbia | West Kelowna Warriors (BCHL) | — |
| 27 | (United States) | Ian Carpentier | Senior | F | 6' 0" (1.83 m) | 185 lb (84 kg) | 2000-06-22 | Worcester, Massachusetts | Boston Junior Bruins (NCDC) | — |
| 30 | (Canada) | Luke Pearson | Junior | G | 6' 2" (1.88 m) | 185 lb (84 kg) | 2001-01-29 | Whitby, Ontario | Alberni Valley Bulldogs (BCHL) | — |
| 47 | (United States) | Nathan Reid | Senior | G | 6' 2" (1.88 m) | 195 lb (88 kg) | 2000-07-12 | Madison, Wisconsin | Muskegon Lumberjacks (USHL) | — |

== Standings ==
2023–24 ECAC Hockey Standings
| | Conference record | | | | | | | | | | Overall record | | | | | |
| | GP | W | L | T | OTW | OTL | SW | PTS | GF | GA | GP | W | L | T | GF | GA |
|---|---|---|---|---|---|---|---|---|---|---|---|---|---|---|---|---|
| #6 Quinnipiac † | 22 | 17 | 4 | 1 | 0 | 2 | 0 | 54 | 99 | 39 | 39 | 27 | 10 | 2 | 160 | 79 |
| #9 Cornell * | 22 | 12 | 6 | 4 | 1 | 2 | 3 | 44 | 74 | 45 | 35 | 22 | 7 | 6 | 115 | 65 |
| Colgate | 22 | 13 | 7 | 2 | 2 | 2 | 2 | 43 | 85 | 68 | 36 | 16 | 16 | 4 | 120 | 112 |
| Dartmouth | 22 | 9 | 6 | 7 | 1 | 1 | 3 | 37 | 66 | 60 | 32 | 13 | 10 | 9 | 92 | 91 |
| Clarkson | 22 | 12 | 9 | 1 | 4 | 2 | 1 | 36 | 62 | 58 | 35 | 18 | 16 | 1 | 95 | 97 |
| Union | 22 | 9 | 10 | 3 | 1 | 1 | 2 | 32 | 75 | 75 | 37 | 16 | 18 | 3 | 123 | 121 |
| St. Lawrence | 22 | 8 | 10 | 4 | 1 | 1 | 1 | 29 | 49 | 64 | 39 | 14 | 19 | 6 | 90 | 118 |
| Harvard | 22 | 6 | 10 | 6 | 1 | 2 | 3 | 28 | 49 | 64 | 32 | 7 | 19 | 6 | 70 | 106 |
| Princeton | 22 | 8 | 11 | 3 | 4 | 0 | 2 | 25 | 70 | 90 | 30 | 10 | 16 | 4 | 89 | 114 |
| Yale | 22 | 7 | 13 | 2 | 1 | 2 | 1 | 25 | 46 | 57 | 30 | 10 | 18 | 2 | 63 | 91 |
| Brown | 22 | 6 | 14 | 2 | 2 | 3 | 1 | 22 | 43 | 69 | 30 | 8 | 19 | 3 | 61 | 98 |
| Rensselaer | 22 | 6 | 13 | 3 | 0 | 0 | 0 | 21 | 58 | 89 | 37 | 10 | 23 | 4 | 93 | 150 |
Championship: March 23, 2024 † indicates conference regular season champion (Cleary Cup) * indicates conference tournament champion (Whitelaw Cup); Rankings: USCHO.com Top 20 Poll

== Schedule and results ==
| Date | Time | Opponent^{#} | Rank^{#} | Site | TV | Decision | Result | Attendance | Record |
Regular Season
| October 27 | 8:00 pm | at Brown | | Meehan Auditorium • Providence, Rhode Island | ESPN+ | Reid | W 3–2 ^{OT} | 798 | 1–0–0 (1–0–0) |
| November 3 | 7:00 pm | #10 Cornell | | Ingalls Rink • New Haven, Connecticut | ESPN+ | Reid | L 1–3 | 2,034 | 1–1–0 (1–1–0) |
| November 4 | 7:00 pm | Colgate | | Ingalls Rink • New Haven, Connecticut | ESPN+ | Stark | L 1–7 | 1,393 | 1–2–0 (1–2–0) |
| November 10 | 7:00 pm | at Princeton | | Hobey Baker Memorial Rink • Princeton, New Jersey | ESPN+ | Reid | L 4–5 ^{OT} | 1,802 | 1–3–0 (1–3–0) |
| November 11 | 7:00 pm | at #10 Quinnipiac | | M&T Bank Arena • Hamden, Connecticut | ESPN+ | Reid | L 2–5 | 3,625 | 1–4–0 (1–4–0) |
| November 17 | 7:00 pm | St. Lawrence | | Ingalls Rink • New Haven, Connecticut | ESPN+ | Stark | W 5–0 | 1,368 | 2–4–0 (2–4–0) |
| November 18 | 7:00 pm | Clarkson | | Ingalls Rink • New Haven, Connecticut | ESPN+ | Reid | L 1–2 | 1,217 | 2–5–0 (2–5–0) |
| November 24 | 9:00 pm | at #4 Denver* | | Magness Arena • Denver, Colorado | | Stark | L 0–5 | 5,817 | 2–6–0 |
| November 25 | 8:00 pm | at #4 Denver* | | Magness Arena • Denver, Colorado | | Reid | L 0–9 | 5,823 | 2–7–0 |
| December 2 | 7:00 pm | Long Island* | | Ingalls Rink • New Haven, Connecticut | ESPN+ | Stark | L 1–3 | 1,029 | 2–8–0 |
| December 8 | 7:00 pm | Merrimack* | | Ingalls Rink • New Haven, Connecticut | ESPN+ | Reid | W 5–2 | 1,116 | 3–8–0 |
| December 10 | 7:00 pm | Long Island* | | Ingalls Rink • New Haven, Connecticut | ESPN+ | Stark | W 5–3 | 866 | 4–8–0 |
| December 29 | 7:00 pm | #2 Boston University* | | Ingalls Rink • New Haven, Connecticut | ESPN+ | Reid | L 1–6 | 2,871 | 4–9–0 |
| December 31 | 2:00 pm | McGill* | | Ingalls Rink • New Haven, Connecticut (Exhibition) | ESPN+ | Stark | W 5–1 | 1,307 | |
| January 5 | 7:00 pm | at Rensselaer | | Houston Field House • Troy, New York | ESPN+ | Stark | W 2–1 | 1,677 | 5–9–0 (3–5–0) |
| January 6 | 7:00 pm | at Union | | Achilles Rink • Schenectady, New York | ESPN+ | Stark | W 4–2 | 1,904 | 6–9–0 (4–5–0) |
| January 12 | 7:00 pm | Dartmouth | | Ingalls Rink • New Haven, Connecticut | ESPN+ | Stark | W 5–0 | 1,406 | 7–9–0 (5–5–0) |
| January 13 | 7:00 pm | Harvard | | Ingalls Rink • New Haven, Connecticut (Rivalry) | ESPN+ | Stark | L 0–1 | 2,806 | 7–10–0 (5–6–0) |
| January 19 | 7:00 pm | at Clarkson | | Cheel Arena • Potsdam, New York | ESPN+ | Reid | L 3–5 | 2,369 | 7–11–0 (5–7–0) |
| January 20 | 7:00 pm | at St. Lawrence | | Appleton Arena • Canton, New York | ESPN+ | Stark | L 2–4 | 1,230 | 7–12–0 (5–8–0) |
Connecticut Ice
| January 26 | 7:30 pm | vs. #7 Quinnipiac | | XL Center • Hartford, Connecticut (Connecticut Ice Semifinal) | SNY | Stark | L 0–1 | 4,693 | 7–13–0 (5–9–0) |
| January 27 | 3:30 pm | vs. Sacred Heart* | | XL Center • Hartford, Connecticut (Connecticut Ice Consolation Game) | SNY | Stark | W 3–2 | 3,927 | 8–13–0 |
| February 2 | 7:00 pm | Union | | Ingalls Rink • New Haven, Connecticut | ESPN+ | Stark | W 3–1 | 1,371 | 9–13–0 (6–9–0) |
| February 3 | 7:00 pm | Rensselaer | | Ingalls Rink • New Haven, Connecticut | ESPN+ | Stark | T 1–1 ^{SOW} | 1,674 | 9–13–1 (6–9–1) |
| February 9 | 7:00 pm | Brown | | Ingalls Rink • New Haven, Connecticut | ESPN+ | Stark | W 3–1 | 1,637 | 10–13–1 (7–9–1) |
| February 16 | 7:00 pm | at Colgate | | Class of 1965 Arena • Hamilton, New York | ESPN+ | Stark | L 2–5 | 897 | 10–14–1 (7–10–1) |
| February 17 | 7:00 pm | at #12 Cornell | | Lynah Rink • Ithaca, New York | ESPN+ | Stark | T 1–1 ^{SOL} | 4,267 | 10–14–2 (7–10–2) |
| February 23 | 7:00 pm | Princeton | | Ingalls Rink • New Haven, Connecticut | ESPN+ | Reid | L 1–4 | 2,774 | 10–15–2 (7–11–2) |
| March 1 | 7:00 pm | at Harvard | | Bright-Landry Hockey Center • Boston, Massachusetts (Rivalry) | ESPN+ | Stark | L 1–2 | 3,095 | 10–16–2 (7–12–2) |
| March 2 | 7:00 pm | at Dartmouth | | Thompson Arena • Hanover, New Hampshire | ESPN+ | Stark | L 1–4 | 2,278 | 10–17–2 (7–13–2) |
ECAC Hockey Tournament
| March 8 | 7:00 pm | at St. Lawrence* | | Appleton Arena • Canton, New York (First Round) | ESPN+ | Stark | L 2–4 | 1,577 | 10–18–2 |
*Non-conference game. ^{#}Rankings from USCHO.com Poll. All times are in Eastern Time. Source:

== Scoring statistics ==
| Name | Position | Games | Goals | Assists | Points | PIM |
|---|---|---|---|---|---|---|
| David Chen | C | 30 | 9 | 9 | 18 | 19 |
| Briggs Gammill | F | 28 | 8 | 7 | 15 | 24 |
| Ian Carpentier | C | 26 | 8 | 6 | 14 | 8 |
| Ryan Conroy | D | 30 | 2 | 11 | 13 | 26 |
| David Andreychuk | C/LW | 30 | 3 | 9 | 12 | 14 |
| Nik Allain | F | 28 | 6 | 6 | 12 | 27 |
| Will Dineen | F | 20 | 7 | 2 | 9 | 27 |
| Rhys Bentham | D | 26 | 6 | 3 | 9 | 6 |
| Teddy Wooding | F | 21 | 1 | 6 | 7 | 8 |
| Bayard Hall | D | 30 | 1 | 5 | 6 | 10 |
| Iisai Pesonen | C | 30 | 5 | 1 | 6 | 24 |
| Connor Sullivan | D | 30 | 0 | 5 | 5 | 29 |
| Reilly Connors | F | 30 | 1 | 4 | 5 | 18 |
| Dylan Herzog | D | 28 | 0 | 5 | 5 | 6 |
| Henry Wagner | LW | 30 | 1 | 3 | 4 | 10 |
| Kalen Szeto | F | 27 | 2 | 2 | 4 | 23 |
| Elan Bar-Lev-Wise | C | 28 | 1 | 2 | 3 | 30 |
| Will Richter | F | 14 | 1 | 1 | 2 | 0 |
| JoJo Tanaka-Campbell | F | 11 | 1 | 1 | 2 | 2 |
| Kieran O'Hearn | D | 29 | 0 | 1 | 1 | 36 |
| Owen Forester | D | 25 | 0 | 1 | 1 | 38 |
| Tucker Hartmann | D | 10 | 0 | 1 | 1 | 6 |
| Jack Stark | G | 21 | 0 | 0 | 0 | 0 |
| Seiya Tanaka-Campbell | F | 3 | 0 | 0 | 0 | 0 |
| Nathan Reid | G | 10 | 0 | 0 | 0 | 0 |
| Ryan Stevens | F | 2 | 0 | 0 | 0 | 0 |
| Total | | | 63 | 91 | 154 | 391 |

== Goaltending statistics ==
| Name | Games | Minutes | Wins | Losses | Ties | Goals against | Saves | Shut outs | SV % | GAA |
|---|---|---|---|---|---|---|---|---|---|---|
| Jack Stark | 22 | 1213:52 | 8 | 10 | 2 | 45 | 512 | 2 | .919 | 2.22 |
| Nathan Reid | 11 | 596:32 | 2 | 8 | 0 | 41 | 243 | 0 | .856 | 4.12 |
| Empty Net | - | 12:17 | - | - | - | 5 | - | - | - | - |
| Total | 30 | 1822:41 | 10 | 18 | 2 | 95 | 755 | 2 | .888 | 3.13 |

== Rankings ==
| Poll | Week | | | | | | | | | | | | | | | | | | | | | | | | | | |
| Poll | Pre | 1 | 2 | 3 | 4 | 5 | 6 | 7 | 8 | 9 | 10 | 11 | 12 | 13 | 14 | 15 | 16 | 17 | 18 | 19 | 20 | 21 | 22 | 23 | 24 | 25 | 26 (Final) |
|---|---|---|---|---|---|---|---|---|---|---|---|---|---|---|---|---|---|---|---|---|---|---|---|---|---|---|---|
| USCHO.com | NR | NR | NR | NR | NR | NR | NR | NR | NR | NR | NR | – | NR | NR | NR | NR | NR | NR | NR | NR | NR | NR | NR | NR | NR | – | NR |
| USA Hockey | NR | NR | NR | NR | NR | NR | NR | NR | NR | NR | NR | NR | – | NR | NR | NR | NR | NR | NR | NR | NR | NR | NR | NR | NR | NR | NR |

Note: USCHO did not release a poll in weeks 11 and 25.
Note: USA Hockey did not release a poll in week 12.

== Awards and honors ==
| Player | Award | Ref |
|---|---|---|
| Jack Stark | ECAC Hockey Rookie Team | |
