= Ian Shane =

American ice hockey player

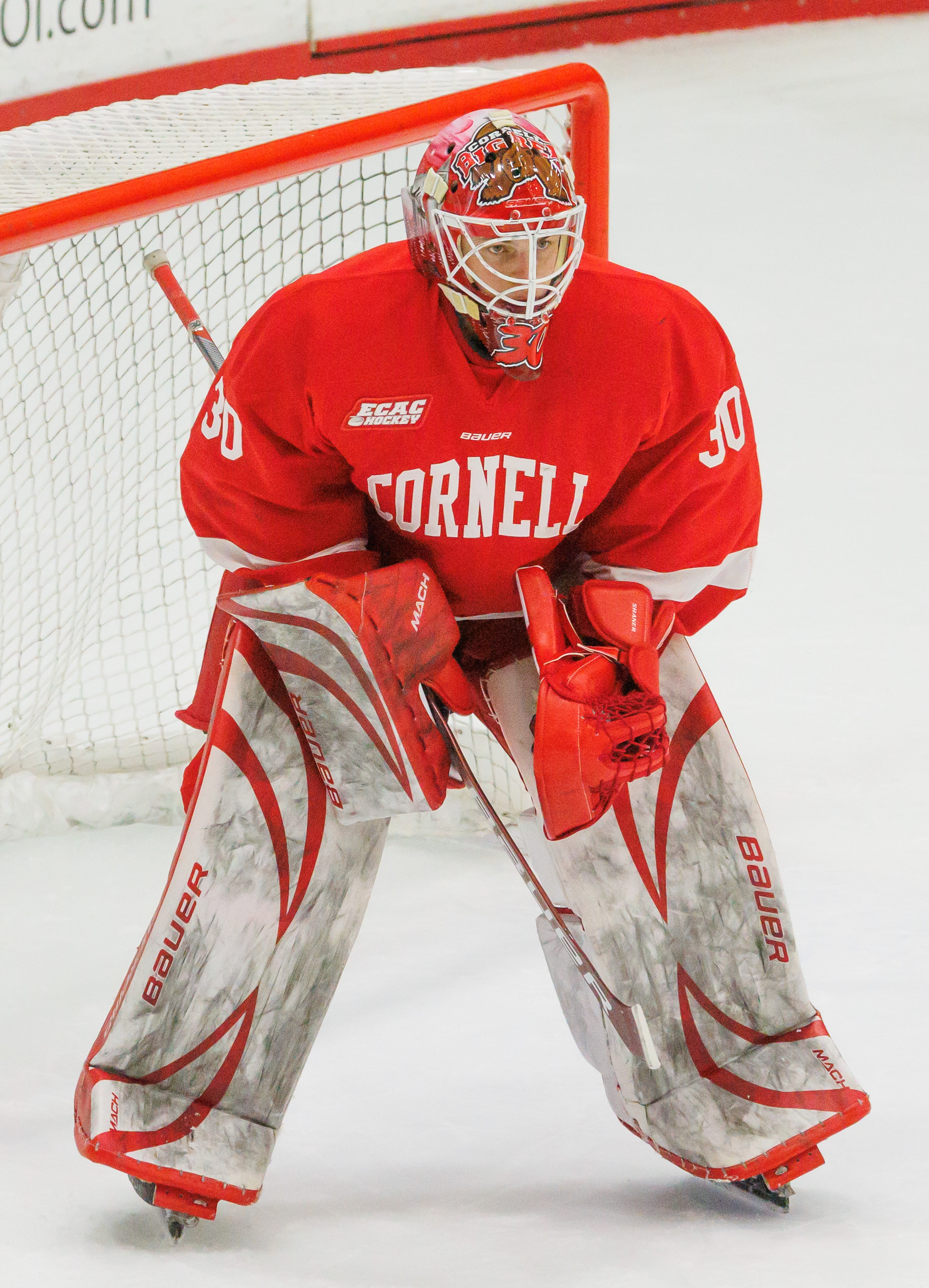
- Shane with the Cornell Big Red in 2023
- Born: September 24, 2000 (age 25) Manhattan Beach, California, U.S.
- Height: 6 ft 0 in (183 cm)
- Weight: 168 lb (76 kg; 12 st 0 lb)
- Position: Goaltender
- Catches: Left
- ECAC Hockey team: Cornell

Ian Shane is an American college ice hockey goaltender for Cornell. He was named a Second Team All-American in 2023–24.

== Playing career ==
=== College ===
Shane began attending Cornell University in the fall of 2021 after the Big Red had cancelled its entire season the year before due to COVID-19. Shane began his freshman season as the team's third goaltender, however, by the middle of the season he got his first turn as the starter in goal. He swiftly established himself as the best option, backstopping a road sweep of #5 North Dakota and then downing top-ranked Quinnipiac a few weeks later. Unfortunately, just as he was getting used to the college game, head coach Mike Schafer suffered a medical emergency and had to sit out the remainder of the season while being implanted with a coronary stent. Without their bench boss, the team struggled down the backstretch and they dropped 10 spots in the national rankings. Cornell ended up just missing out on a tournament appearance but Shane had still performed well through the rough patch. He ended the year with a save percentage of .933 and was fourth nationally with a 1.72 goals against average.

For his sophomore season, Shane entered as the established starter and held the job for the entire season. While his save percentage dropped, Cornell's strong defense helped him to keep his sub-2.00 g.a.a. Despite a rocky start to the season, Cornell was able to build momentum as the year went along and by the time the playoffs rolled around, the Big Red were guaranteed a spot in the national tournament. In his first tournament appearance, Shane shoutout Denver, the first blanking by Cornell since Ken Dryden in 1967. Though Shane continued his strong play in the regional final, a lack of scoring by Cornell cost the team and they were knocked out with a 1–2 loss.

Year three for Shane looked to be even better, with statistical improvements across the board. Unfortunately, because ECAC Hockey was ranked lower than they had been the year before, Cornell would have to win their conference championship to make the national tournament once more. Shane had a few shaky performances but he turned in a tremendous performance in the title game to win Cornell the Whitelaw Cup for the first time in 14 years and guarantee the program an NCAA appearance. In their opening game, Maine opened the scoring but Shane refused to allow a second goal. The junior netminder turned aside 31 of 32 shots to lead the Big Red to victory and set up a rematch with Denver in the regional final. The roles reversed for the Big Red and, after taking an early lead, Cornell's offense failed to build upon the advantage and the team ended up losing 1–2.

Despite the disappointing end to the season, Shane had the lowest goals against average in the nation by a considerable margin. He was named as both the Ken Dryden Award winner and a Second Team All-American.

== Career statistics ==
Season	Team	League	GP	W	L	T	MIN	GA	SO	GAA	SV%
2019–20	Chicago Steel	USHL	21	16	3	1	1,202	65	1	3.25	.886
2020–21	Chicago Steel	USHL	8	4	2	2	484	35	0	4.34	.837
2020–21	Bismarck Bobcats	NAHL	16	8	6	1	901	39	0	2.60	.914
2021–22	Cornell	ECAC Hockey	17	7	6	3	979	28	3	1.72	.933
2022–23	Cornell	ECAC Hockey	33	20	10	1	1,853	53	5	1.72	.916
2023–24	Cornell	ECAC Hockey	34	22	5	6	2,021	57	3	1.69	.923
2024–25	Cornell	ECAC Hockey	34	17	11	6	1979	73	3	2.21	.905
2024–25	Norfolk Admirals	ECHL	5	3	0	2	307	13	1	2.54	.913
2025–26	Kansas City Mavericks	ECHL	8	2	4	1	431	18	0	2.51	.892
2025–26	Reading Royals	ECHL	5	1	1	0	209	9	0	2.58	.928
NCAA totals			82	49	21	10	4,853	138	11	1.71	.923

== Awards and honors ==
Award	Year
College
ECAC Hockey First Team	2023–24
AHCA East Second Team All-American	2023–24

Awards and achievements
Preceded by Yaniv Perets	Ken Dryden Award; 2023–24	Succeeded by Ethan Langenegger
