= Cooper Black (ice hockey) =

American ice hockey player

- Born: June 14, 2001 (age 25) Alpena, Michigan, U.S.
- Height: 6 ft 9 in (206 cm)
- Weight: 245 lb (111 kg; 17 st 7 lb)
- Position: Goaltender
- Catches: Right
- NHL team: Florida Panthers
- NHL draft: Undrafted
- Playing career: 2024–present

Cooper Black (born June 14, 2001) is an American professional ice hockey goaltender for the Florida Panthers of the National Hockey League (NHL).

Black played college hockey for Dartmouth College before signing as a free agent with Florida in 2024 and turning professional. He signed a two-year, two-way contract with Florida in June 2026, after playing for their American Hockey League affiliate Charlotte Checkers for the previous two seasons.

Black played his first NHL game on October 22, 2026, becoming the tallest goaltender to play in an NHL game, at 6 feet 9 inches (2.06 m).
