= Jonathan Castagna =

- Born: April 20, 2005 (age 21) Toronto, Ontario, Canada
- Height: 6 ft 1 in (185 cm)
- Weight: 183 lb (83 kg; 13 st 1 lb)
- Position: Centre
- Shoots: Left
- NHL team: Calgary Flames
- NHL draft: 70th overall, 2023; Arizona Coyotes
- Playing career: 2026–present

Jonathan Marc Castagna (born April 20, 2005) is a Canadian professional ice hockey centre for the Calgary Flames of the National Hockey League (NHL). Before, he played three seasons with Cornell University's hockey team.

== Playing career ==
The Arizona Coyotes of the National Hockey League (NHL) selected Castagna in the third round, with the 70th overall pick, of the 2023 NHL entry draft. On March 4, 2026, the Utah Mammoth traded Castagna, Olli Määttä, and three second-round picks in the 2026 NHL entry draft to the Calgary Flames in exchange for MacKenzie Weegar. After three seasons with the Cornell Big Red men's ice hockey team, Castagna signed with the Flames on March 30.

After beginning the 2026–27 season with the Calgary Wranglers, the Flames' American Hockey League (AHL) affiliate, Castagna received his first NHL call-up on October 7. He recorded a point in his debut, assisting on Adam Klapka's goal in a 7–3 loss to the Colorado Avalanche. Castagna scored his first two NHL goals on November 17, in a 5–2 win over the San Jose Sharks.

== Career statistics ==
			Regular season					Playoffs
Season	Team	League	GP	G	A	Pts	PIM	GP	G	A	Pts	PIM
2023–24	Cornell Big Red	ECAC	35	11	14	25	25	—	—	—	—	—
2024–25	Cornell Big Red	ECAC	32	5	10	15	20	—	—	—	—	—
2025–26	Cornell Big Red	ECAC	34	15	19	34	31	—	—	—	—	—
NCAA totals			101	31	43	74	76	—	—	—	—	—
