= 2023–24 Quinnipiac Bobcats men's ice hockey season =

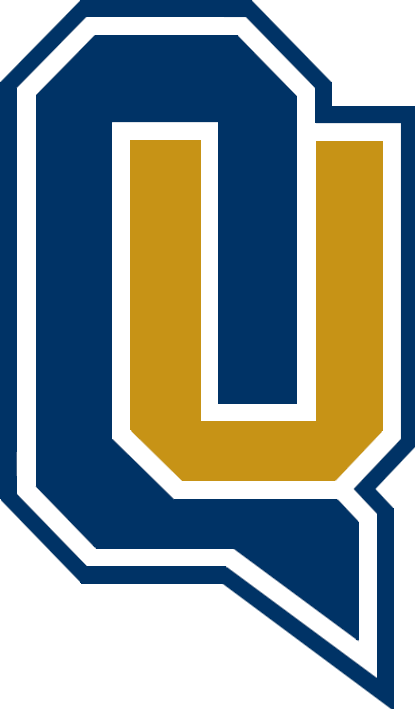

Connecticut Ice, Champion ECAC Hockey, Champion NCAA Tournament, Regional Final
- Conference: 1st ECAC Hockey
- Home ice: M&T Bank Arena

Rankings
- USCHO: #6
- USA Hockey: #6

Record
- Overall: 27–10–2
- Conference: 17–4–1
- Home: 16–3–0
- Road: 8–5–2
- Neutral: 3–2–0

Coaches and captains
- Head coach: Rand Pecknold
- Assistant coaches: Joe Dumais; Mike Corbett; Justin Eddy
- Captain: Jayden Lee
- Alternate captain(s): Collin Graf; Jacob Quillan; Iivari Räsänen

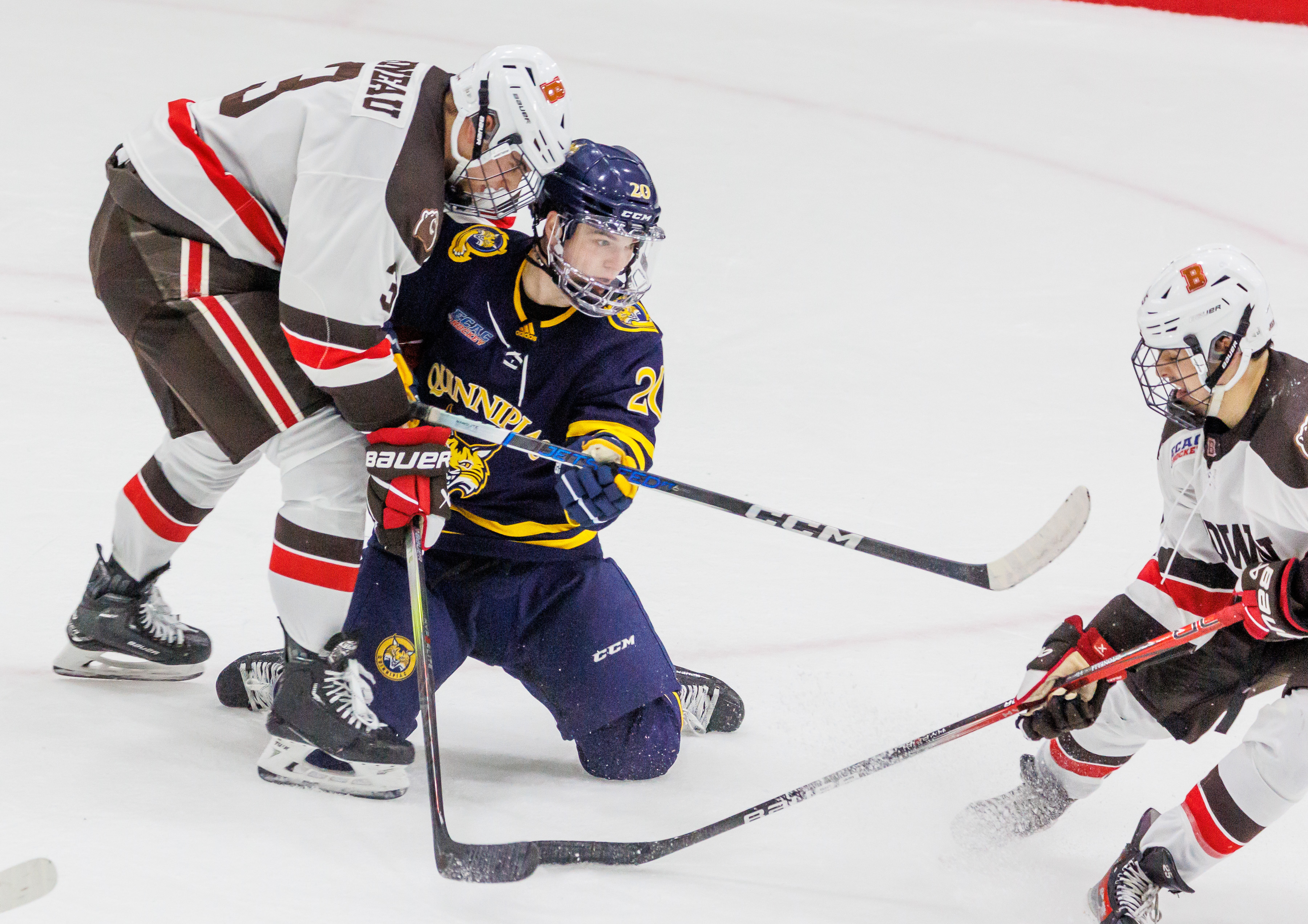
Quinnipiac's Mason Marcellus with Brown Bears Alex Pineau and Zackary (Zach) Tonelli

The 2023–24 Quinnipiac Bobcats Men's ice hockey season was the 48th season of play for the program, the 26th at the Division I level and 19th in ECAC Hockey. The Bobcats represented Quinnipiac University in the 2023–24 NCAA Division I men's ice hockey season, played their home games at the M&T Bank Arena and were coached by Rand Pecknold in his 30th season.

== Season ==
Coming off of the program's 1st national championship, the Bobcats needed to replace nearly half of the roster largely due to graduation. The biggest void came in goal where both Yaniv Perets and Chase Clark had departed. In their place, Quinnipiac welcomed Boston University transfer Vinny Duplessis, who was expected to begin the season as the starter, and freshman Matej Marinov. Three defensemen transferred in to join what had been one of the top defensive teams in the country and were joined by an equal amount of first-year players. While the offense had lost some talent as well, the Bobcats still resturned several key players, including Collin Graf and overtime hero Jacob Quillan.

The preseason #2 had trouble getting out of the gate and Quinnipiac dropped several games in October. The defense looked strong even with all the new faces but the offense was a bit hit-or-miss. In several games, the Bobcats were unable to distance themselves for their opponents and ended up playing four overtime games in the first month of the season, losing three. After that middling non-conference start, Quinnipiac had the chance to prove that they were still the class of ECAC Hockey and that's exactly what they did. The Bobcats went undefeated in their first 10 conference matches and were heads and shoulders above 2nd place when they entered the winter break. Though the team's non-conference results were middling, most of their opponents ended up climbing up into the national polls and diminished the impact of those losses. By Christmas, Quinnipiac was 3rd in the PairWise and only a total collapse would stop them from returning to the NCAA tournament.

While the team as able to get scoring from up and down the lineup, the Bobcats still went through dry spells, albeit briefly. In late January the team struggled through one of those periods and scored 4 goals over a 3-game stretch. The scoring returned to form afterwards and remained for the rest of the season. Quinnipiac finished the year averaging over 4 goals per game and under 2 goals against. The disparity earned the team its fourth consecutive ECAC title and a guarantee of an NCAA berth.

The Bobcats received a bye into the quarterfinal round and were met by Rensselaer, the worst team in the conference. While RPI was hopelessly outgunned in the first game, they fought back in the rematch to give Quinnipiac a scare. Andon Cerbone's power play marker midway through the final period put the Bobcats ahead for good and two empty-net goals swept the Engineers aside, clearing the way into the semifinals. Next up was St. Lawrence and Quinnipiac seemed to sleepwalk through the game. The Bobcats never appeared to have any sense of urgency early and that ended up costing them dearly. The Saints scored twice in the second to take a sunning 2-goal lead. Quinnipiac tried to find their game in the third but the Larries were playing an inspired brand of defense and Quinnipiac was shutout for the first time all season.

Quinnipiac dropped to 9th in the PairWise and was placed opposite to Wisconsin in the East Regional bracket. Christophe Fillion got the Bobcats an early lead, scoring just 2 minutes into the game. Quinnipiac remained in control for most of the first but was unable to build on their advantage. That left the door open for the Badgers, who potted two goals in 75 seconds at the start of the second period. The Bobcats fought hard to even the score and, with 90 seconds left in the middle frame, Victor Czerneckianair knotted the score. The third passed without further scoring and the two teams needed overtime to settle the game. While Quinnipiac had been dreadful in extra time to that point, going 1–5–1 during the season, the previous games were played at 3-on-3 and the NCAA tournament kept the teams at 5-on-5. That allowed Quinnipiac to play its game and remain in control for the extra session. Around the middle of the period, a stretch pass from behind the net eventually found its way to a streaking Czerneckianair and, after a quick deke, the sophomore scored the biggest goal of his career to send Quinnipiac to the regional final.

The favorites for the national championship began by assaulting Duplessis with 15 shots in the first but the Bobcat netminder turned aside every attempt. Quillan converted on Quinnipiac's second power play of the game early in the second and was followed soon thereafter by Iivari Räsänen for a 2-goal lead. Unfortunately, Czerneckianair took a penalty after the ensuing faceoff and it only took BC 9 seconds to cut the lead in half. A second goal from the Eagles tied the game but Quinnipiac was nt done and the two exchanged goals to finish the period tied at three apiece. Quillan's second power play marker of the game gave Quinnipiac their third lead of the night just 16 seconds into the third and the team did everything it could to hold onto their advantage. The oppressive Bobcat defense held BC at bay and hardly allowed them a shot on goal for the rest of the period. As the clock ticked away it appeared that the Bobcats might be able to pull off the upset but, with under 5 minutes to play, a lapse on defense allowed an open Eagle to get a shot from the high slot and it beat a visibly disappointed Duplessis stick-side. Both sides tried to find the winning goal in the final few minutes but overtime was once more required. Both sides got a few chances early but, just past the 3-minute mark, a shot from the point squibbed in on the Bobcat goal. Duplessis made the save but was unable to freeze the puck and lost his balance. He fell backwards, leaving the rubber sitting in the blue paint. Tellier was the first on the puck and tried to sweep it out of danger, however, he was not hard on the clearing attempt and the puck landed right on the stick of a BC forward who popped it into the goal before Duplessis got back in position.

== Departures ==
Player	Position	Nationality	Cause
Skyler Brind'Amour	Forward	United States	Graduation (signed with Charlotte Checkers)
Desi Burgart	Forward	Canada	Graduation (retired)
Matthew Campbell	Defenseman	Canada	Transferred to Michigan Tech
Joey Cipollone	Forward	United States	Graduation (signed with Bridgeport Islanders)
Chase Clark	Goaltender	United States	Transferred to Sacred Heart
Ethan De Jong	Forward	Canada	Graduation (signed with Bakersfield Condors)
T. J. Friedmann	Forward	United States	Graduation (signed with Utica Comets)
Jake Johnson	Defenseman	United States	Graduation (signed with Fort Wayne Komets)
Michael Lombardi	Forward	United States	Graduation (signed with Tucson Roadrunners)
Zach Metsa	Defenseman	United States	Graduation (signed with Rochester Americans)
Jacob Nordqvist	Defenseman	Sweden	Graduation (retired)
Yaniv Perets	Goaltender	Canada	Signed professional contract (Carolina Hurricanes)

== Recruiting ==
Player	Position	Nationality	Age	Notes
Andon Cerbone	Forward	United States	19	Stamford, CT
Vinny Duplessis	Goaltender	Canada	24	Quebec City, QC; transfer from Boston University
Mason Marcellus	Forward	Canada	21	Greely, ON
Matej Marinov	Goaltender	Slovakia	20	Nitra, SVK
Jake Martin	Defenseman	United States	20	White Bear Lake, MN; transfer from Wisconsin
Matt McGroarty	Forward	United States	20	Westport, CT
Cooper Moore	Defenseman	United States	22	Greenwich, CT; transfer from North Dakota; selected 128th overall in 2019
Davis Pennington	Defenseman	United States	22	Saline, MI; transfer from Omaha
Chase Ramsay	Defenseman	United States	20	Granite Springs, NY
Travis Treloar	Defenseman	Sweden	22	Kalmar, SWE; transfer from Ohio State
Zach Tupker	Forward	Canada	23	Collingwood, ON; graduate transfer from Cornell
Nicky Wallace	Defenseman	United States	20	Atlantic Highlands, NJ

== Roster ==
As of July 24, 2023.

No.	Nat.	Player	Class	Pos	Height	Weight	DoB	Hometown	Previous team	NHL rights
2	(Finland)	Iivari Räsänen (A)	Senior	D	6' 1" (1.85 m)	200 lb (91 kg)	2001-05-23	Tampere, Finland	Muskegon Lumberjacks (USHL)	—
3	(United States)	Cooper Moore	Senior	D	6' 2" (1.88 m)	187 lb (85 kg)	2001-02-16	Greenwich, Connecticut	North Dakota (NCHC)	DET, 128th overall 2019
4	(United States)	Davis Pennington	Junior	D	5' 10" (1.78 m)	185 lb (84 kg)	2001-05-27	Saline, Michigan	Omaha (NCHC)	—
5	(United States)	C. J. McGee	Graduate	D	6' 0" (1.83 m)	180 lb (82 kg)	1999-03-12	Pearl River, New York	Shreveport Mudbugs (NAHL)	—
6	(Canada)	Charles-Alexis Legault	Sophomore	D	6' 3" (1.91 m)	214 lb (97 kg)	2003-09-05	Kelowna, British Columbia	West Kelowna Warriors (BCHL)	CAR, 139th overall 2023
7	(United States)	Jake Martin	Freshman	D	6' 0" (1.83 m)	187 lb (85 kg)	2003-03-18	White Bear Lake, Minnesota	Green Bay Gamblers (USHL)	—
8	(United States)	Matthew McGroarty	Freshman	F	5' 10" (1.78 m)	172 lb (78 kg)	2003-01-30	Westport, Connecticut	Madison Capitols (USHL)	—
10	(Canada)	Zach Tupker	Graduate	F	6' 1" (1.85 m)	187 lb (85 kg)	1999-12-23	Collingwood, Ontario	Cornell (ECAC)	—
11	(United States)	Collin Graf (A)	Junior	F	6' 1" (1.85 m)	195 lb (88 kg)	2003-09-21	Lincoln, Massachusetts	Union (ECAC)	—
12	(United States)	Nicky Wallace	Freshman	D	5' 8" (1.73 m)	165 lb (75 kg)	2003-05-07	Atlantic Highlands, New Jersey	Madison Capitols (USHL)	—
13	(Canada)	Christophe Fillion	Senior	F	5' 11" (1.8 m)	175 lb (79 kg)	2000-06-18	Sherbrooke, Quebec	Muskegon Lumberjacks (USHL)	—
14	(United States)	Victor Czerneckianair	Sophomore	F	5' 11" (1.8 m)	174 lb (79 kg)	2002-02-17	Southington, Connecticut	Tri-City Storm (USHL)	—
15	(Canada)	Jayden Lee (C)	Graduate	D	5' 9" (1.75 m)	160 lb (73 kg)	2001-01-10	North Vancouver, British Columbia	Powell River Kings (BCHL)	—
16	(Canada)	Jacob Quillan (A)	Junior	F	6' 0" (1.83 m)	195 lb (88 kg)	2002-02-02	Dartmouth, Nova Scotia	Penticton Vees (BCHL)	—
17	(Sweden)	Travis Treloar	Senior	F	5' 11" (1.8 m)	176 lb (80 kg)	2001-05-12	Kalmar, Sweden	Ohio State (Big Ten)	—
18	(United States)	Anthony Cipollone	Sophomore	F	5' 6" (1.68 m)	165 lb (75 kg)	2002-05-14	Purchase, New York	Brooks Bandits (AJHL)	—
19	(United States)	Chase Ramsay	Freshman	D	6' 0" (1.83 m)	181 lb (82 kg)	2003-06-10	Granite Springs, New York	Des Moines Buccaneers (USHL)	—
20	(Canada)	Mason Marcellus	Freshman	F	5' 9" (1.75 m)	165 lb (75 kg)	2002-07-19	Greely, Ontario	Lincoln Stars (USHL)	—
24	(Canada)	Alex Power	Sophomore	F	6' 1" (1.85 m)	185 lb (84 kg)	2002-01-04	St. John's, Newfoundland and Labrador	Bonnyville Pontiacs (AJHL)	—
26	(United States)	Timothy Heinke	Sophomore	F	6' 1" (1.85 m)	194 lb (88 kg)	2001-10-02	Kensington, Connecticut	South Shore Kings (NCDC)	—
27	(United States)	Andon Cerbone	Freshman	F	5' 9" (1.75 m)	163 lb (74 kg)	2004-04-13	Stamford, Connecticut	Youngstown Phantoms (USHL)	—
28	(United States)	Sam Lipkin	Sophomore	F	6' 2" (1.88 m)	192 lb (87 kg)	2003-01-03	Philadelphia, Pennsylvania	Chicago Steel (USHL)	ARI, 223rd overall 2021
29	(Canada)	Cristophe Tellier	Junior	F	6' 1" (1.85 m)	185 lb (84 kg)	2000-05-23	Sherbrooke, Quebec	Muskegon Lumberjacks (USHL)	—
31	(United States)	Noah Altman	Junior	G	6' 7" (2.01 m)	209 lb (95 kg)	2000-08-16	Los Angeles, California	Bismarck Bobcats (NAHL)	—
35	(Slovakia)	Matej Marinov	Freshman	G	6' 0" (1.83 m)	157 lb (71 kg)	2003-06-16	Nitra, Slovakia	Fargo Force (USHL)	—
37	(Canada)	Vinny Duplessis	Senior	G	6' 1" (1.85 m)	170 lb (77 kg)	1999-03-19	Quebec City, Quebec	Boston University (HEA)	—

=== Team photo ===
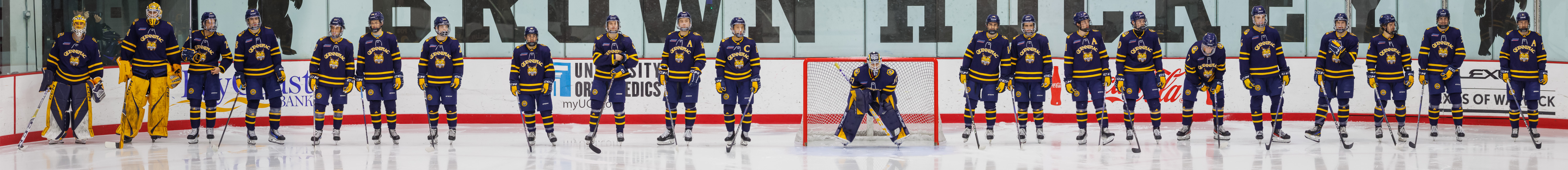
2023-2024 Quinnipiac Bobcats at Brown's Meehan Auditorium

== Standings ==
2023–24 ECAC Hockey Standings
	Conference record										Overall record					
	GP	W	L	T	OTW	OTL	SW	PTS	GF	GA	GP	W	L	T	GF	GA
#6 Quinnipiac †	22	17	4	1	0	2	0	54	99	39	39	27	10	2	160	79
#9 Cornell *	22	12	6	4	1	2	3	44	74	45	35	22	7	6	115	65
Colgate	22	13	7	2	2	2	2	43	85	68	36	16	16	4	120	112
Dartmouth	22	9	6	7	1	1	3	37	66	60	32	13	10	9	92	91
Clarkson	22	12	9	1	4	2	1	36	62	58	35	18	16	1	95	97
Union	22	9	10	3	1	1	2	32	75	75	37	16	18	3	123	121
St. Lawrence	22	8	10	4	1	1	1	29	49	64	39	14	19	6	90	118
Harvard	22	6	10	6	1	2	3	28	49	64	32	7	19	6	70	106
Princeton	22	8	11	3	4	0	2	25	70	90	30	10	16	4	89	114
Yale	22	7	13	2	1	2	1	25	46	57	30	10	18	2	63	91
Brown	22	6	14	2	2	3	1	22	43	69	30	8	19	3	61	98
Rensselaer	22	6	13	3	0	0	0	21	58	89	37	10	23	4	93	150
Championship: March 23, 2024 † indicates conference regular season champion (Cleary Cup) * indicates conference tournament champion (Whitelaw Cup); Rankings: USCHO.com Top 20 Poll

== Schedule and results ==
Date	Time	Opponent^{#}	Rank^{#}	Site	TV	Decision	Result	Attendance	Record
Regular Season
October 7	7:00 pm	#6 Boston College*	#2	M&T Bank Arena • Hamden, Connecticut	ESPN+	Duplessis	L 1–2 ^{OT}	3,700	0–1–0
October 8	4:00 pm	at #19 Northeastern*	#2	Matthews Arena • Boston, Massachusetts (Exhibition)	ESPN+	Marinov	T 2–2 ^{OT}		
October 13	7:05 pm	at American International*	#5	MassMutual Center • Springfield, Massachusetts	FloHockey	Duplessis	W 3–2 ^{OT}	567	1–1–0
October 14	7:00 pm	American International*	#5	M&T Bank Arena • Hamden, Connecticut	ESPN+	Marinov	W 8–0	3,089	2–1–0
October 20	7:00 pm	at New Hampshire*	#4	Whittemore Center • Durham, New Hampshire	ESPN+	Duplessis	W 5–2	5,689	3–1–0
October 21	7:00 pm	at New Hampshire*	#4	Whittemore Center • Durham, New Hampshire	ESPN+, NESN	Duplessis	L 4–5 ^{OT}	5,169	3–2–0
October 27	7:00 pm	Maine*	#5	M&T Bank Arena • Hamden, Connecticut	ESPN+, NESN	Marinov	L 1–2 ^{OT}	2,771	3–3–0
October 28	7:00 pm	Maine*	#5	M&T Bank Arena • Hamden, Connecticut	ESPN+	Duplessis	W 4–1	2,614	4–3–0
November 3	7:00 pm	at Dartmouth	#8	Thompson Arena • Hanover, New Hampshire	ESPN+	Duplessis	T 2–2 ^{SOL}	1,113	4–3–1 (0–0–1)
November 4	7:00 pm	at #19 Harvard	#8	Bright-Landry Hockey Center • Boston, Massachusetts	ESPN+	Duplessis	W 6–0	2,194	5–3–1 (1–0–1)
November 10	7:00 pm	Brown	#10	M&T Bank Arena • Hamden, Connecticut	ESPN+	Marinov	W 5–1	2,979	6–3–1 (2–0–1)
November 11	7:00 pm	Yale	#10	M&T Bank Arena • Hamden, Connecticut	ESPN+	Duplessis	W 5–2	3,625	7–3–1 (3–0–1)
November 17	7:00 pm	#10 Cornell	#7	M&T Bank Arena • Hamden, Connecticut	ESPN+	Duplessis	W 8–4	2,884	8–3–1 (4–0–1)
November 18	7:00 pm	Colgate	#7	M&T Bank Arena • Hamden, Connecticut	ESPN+	Duplessis	W 7–4	2,802	9–3–1 (5–0–1)
November 22	5:00 pm	at #5 Boston University*	#3	Agganis Arena • Boston, Massachusetts	ESPN+	Duplessis	L 2–3	5,296	9–4–1
December 1	7:00 pm	at Rensselaer	#5	Houston Field House • Troy, New York	ESPN+	Marinov	W 5–1	1,856	10–4–1 (6–0–1)
December 2	4:00 pm	at Union	#5	Achilles Rink • Schenectady, New York	ESPN+	Duplessis	W 5–0	1,532	11–4–1 (7–0–1)
December 9	4:00 pm	Long Island*	#5	M&T Bank Arena • Hamden, Connecticut	ESPN+	Marinov	W 4–2	3,087	12–4–1
December 30	7:00 pm	Holy Cross*	#3	M&T Bank Arena • Hamden, Connecticut	ESPN+	Duplessis	W 5–2	3,312	13–4–1
January 6	5:00 pm	at Northeastern*	#3	Matthews Arena • Boston, Massachusetts	ESPN+	Duplessis	T 3–3 ^{OT}	4,182	13–4–2
January 12	7:00 pm	Princeton	#5	M&T Bank Arena • Hamden, Connecticut	ESPN+	Marinov	W 9–2	3,203	14–4–2 (8–0–1)
January 13	7:00 pm	at Princeton	#5	Hobey Baker Memorial Rink • Princeton, New Jersey	ESPN+	Duplessis	W 3–1	2,453	15–4–2 (9–0–1)
January 19	7:00 pm	at Colgate	#3	Class of 1965 Arena • Hamilton, New York	ESPN+	Marinov	L 1–2	1,008	15–5–2 (9–1–1)
January 20	7:00 pm	at #14 Cornell	#3	Lynah Rink • Ithaca, New York	ESPN+	Duplessis	L 2–3 ^{OT}	4,361	15–6–2 (9–2–1)
Connecticut Ice
January 26	7:30 pm	vs. Yale	#7	XL Center • Hartford, Connecticut (Connecticut Ice Semifinal)	SNY	Duplessis	W 1–0	4,693	16–6–2 (10–2–1)
January 27	7:30 pm	vs. Connecticut*	#7	XL Center • Hartford, Connecticut (Connecticut Ice Championship)	SNY	Duplessis	W 4–3	6,429	17–6–2
February 2	7:00 pm	Harvard	#7	M&T Bank Arena • Hamden, Connecticut	ESPN+	Duplessis	W 2–1	3,245	18–6–2 (11–2–1)
February 3	7:00 pm	Dartmouth	#7	M&T Bank Arena • Hamden, Connecticut	ESPN+	Duplessis	W 5–1	3,211	19–6–2 (12–2–1)
February 9	7:00 pm	at St. Lawrence	#5	Appleton Arena • Canton, New York	ESPN+	Marinov	L 1–3	1,109	19–7–2 (12–3–1)
February 10	7:00 pm	at Clarkson	#5	Cheel Arena • Potsdam, New York	ESPN+	Duplessis	W 4–2	2,788	20–7–2 (13–3–1)
February 16	7:00 pm	Union	#9	M&T Bank Arena • Hamden, Connecticut	ESPN+	Duplessis	W 6–2	3,076	21–7–2 (14–3–1)
February 17	7:00 pm	Rensselaer	#9	M&T Bank Arena • Hamden, Connecticut	ESPN+	Duplessis	W 7–2	3,261	22–7–2 (15–3–1)
February 23	7:00 pm	at Brown	#7	Meehan Auditorium • Providence, Rhode Island	ESPN+	Duplessis	W 5–2	1,042	23–7–2 (16–3–1)
March 1	7:00 pm	Clarkson	#7	M&T Bank Arena • Hamden, Connecticut	ESPN+	Duplessis	L 2–3 ^{OT}	3,237	23–8–2 (16–4–1)
March 2	7:00 pm	St. Lawrence	#7	M&T Bank Arena • Hamden, Connecticut	ESPN+	Duplessis	W 8–1	3,220	24–8–2 (17–4–1)
ECAC Hockey Tournament
March 15	7:00 pm	Rensselaer*	#7	M&T Bank Arena • Hamden, Connecticut (Quarterfinal Game 1)	ESPN+	Duplessis	W 5–1	2,721	25–8–2
March 16	7:00 pm	Rensselaer*	#7	M&T Bank Arena • Hamden, Connecticut (Quarterfinal Game 2)	ESPN+	Duplessis	W 5–2	2,909	26–8–2
March 22	4:00 pm	vs. St. Lawrence*	#6	Herb Brooks Arena • Lake Placid, New York (Semifinal)	ESPN+	Duplessis	L 0–3	4,015	26–9–2
NCAA Tournament
March 29	5:30 pm	vs. #9 Wisconsin*	#8	Amica Mutual Pavilion • Providence, Rhode Island (East Regional Semifinal)	ESPNews	Duplessis	W 3–2 ^{OT}	6,988	27–9–2
March 31	4:00 pm	vs. #1 Boston College*	#8	Amica Mutual Pavilion • Providence, Rhode Island (East Regional Final)	ESPN2	Duplessis	L 4–5 ^{OT}	5,835	27–10–2
*Non-conference game. ^{#}Rankings from USCHO.com Poll. All times are in Eastern Time. Source:

== NCAA Tournament ==
=== Regional Semifinal ===
March 29, 2024; 5:30 pm	(2) Wisconsin	2–3 (OT) (0–1, 2–1, 0–0, 0–1)	(3) Quinnipiac	Amica Mutual Pavilion; Attendance: 6,988

Game reference

Kyle McClellan
Goalies
Vinny Duplessis
Referees:
Brandon Schmitt
Nicholas Krebsbach
Linesmen:
Dana Penkivech
Jeff Schultz

	0–1	2:12 – Christophe Fillion (11) (Tellier, Tupker)
(unassisted) Quinn Finley (10) – 21:46	1–1
(Dexheimer, Mehlenbacher) Joe Palodichuk (3) – 23:01	2–1
	2–2	38:28 – Victor Czerneckianair (6) (Tupker, Cipollone)
	2–3	71:04 – GW – Victor Czerneckianair (7) (Treloar, Pennington)

8 min
Penalties
2 min
20
Shots
32

=== Regional final ===
March 31, 2024; 4:00 pm	(1) Boston College	5–4 (OT) (0–0, 3–3, 1–1, 1–0)	(3) Quinnipiac	Amica Mutual Pavilion; Attendance: 5,835

Game reference

Jacob Fowler
Goalies
Vinny Duplessis
Referees:
Brandon Schmitt
Nicholas Krebsbach
Linesmen:
Dana Penkivech
Jeff Schultz

	0–1	21:19 – PP – Jacob Quillan (16) (Treloar, Lee)
	0–2	21:54 – Iivari Räsänen (4) (unassisted)
(Gauthier, Powell) Ryan Leonard (30) – PP – 22:20	1–2
(Jellvik, Gustafsson) Andre Gasseau (12) – 31:35	2–2
	2–3	35:59 – Christophe Fillion (12) (Legault, Räsänen)
(Smith, Powell) Ryan Leonard (31) – 37:55	3–3
	3–4	40:18 – PP – Jacob Quillan (17) (Graf, Legault)
(Gauthier, Jellvik) Aram Minnetian (3) – 55:16	4–4
(unassisted) Jack Malone (12) – GW – 63:06	5–4

8 min
Penalties
10 min
32
Shots
30

Game summary
Both teams started the game quickly, alternating rushes up the ice. The first good scoring chance went to BC's Ryan Leonard who skated through the Bobcat defense and got the puck behind Vinny Duplessis after following up his rebound. Fortunately for Quinnipiac, their defense was first on the loose puck and cleared it out of the zone. Neither team was particularly sound with the puck with both committing turnovers. The Eagles began to get the offense going in the middle part of the first but Quinnipiac's defense was quick to respond. During one of the counter rushes towards the BC net, Gabe Perreault hooked an otherwise wide-open Christophe Fillion and gave the bobcats the first power play of the game. Quinnipiac set up in the Boston College zone and fired a barrage of shots on goal. Jacob Fowler and the defense managed to turn aside several good shots and melt down a handful of other potential chances. Aram Minnetian got control of the puck right when Perreault was coming out of the box and got the winger on a breakaway. Perreault ended up getting three shots on goal from right in front of the next but Duplessis stood strong and stopped the all. During the play that followed, Zach Tupker was called for a minor penalty in front of the BC net to give the Eagles a chance with the man-advantage. Within 30 seconds, Cutter Gauthier was set up with a glorious redirect in front but Duplessis made a highlight-reel save with his left pad. Boston College continued to press and got a few more good chances until Jack Malone knocked a rebound into the net. The referee immediately waved off the goal for being hit with a high stick and the call stood after a review. The Eagles kept their foot on the gas and put a great deal of pressure on the Bobcat defense and ended up forcing C. J. McGee into a hooking penalty. The nation's #2 power play had trouble getting set up in the Quinnipiac zone thanks to solid checking. Near the end of the power play and period, Will Smith cross-checked Victor Czerneckianair and was handed a minor penalty.

Quinnipiac got set up on their power play as soon as play resumed and they remained in the BC end for well over a minute. Just before the end of the man-advantage, a tip from Jacob Quillan found its way between Fowler's legs for the opening goal. Just 35 second later, a shot from Iivari Räsänen along the high wall got past a screened Fowler and Quinnipiac suddenly had a 2-goal lead. On the ensuing play, Czerneckianair was whistled for high-sticking and it took just 8 seconds for Gauthier to set up Leonard for the Eagles' first goal. Even with the BC power play, the first half of the second was largely played in the BC end but, as time wore on, the Eagles began to get to their offensive game. Just before the mid-way point of the match, Jayden Lee took a slashing penalty and gave Boston College yet another chance on the power play. The Bobcats kept BC to the outside and managed to stave off a repeat but just after Lee had exited the box, Andre Gasseau fired the puck from the top of the left circle past a partially screened Duplessis to tie the game. A few minutes later, during a broken play in the Bobcats' end, BC flubbed a scoring chance and Smith committed a hooking penalty as Quinnipiac started back up the ice. Quinnipiac found it far tougher to set up in the offensive zone on their second man-advantage and the Boston College kept the game tied. Immediately after the end of the power play, BC tried to find Smith for a breakaway but they were called for icing. On the ensuing faceoff, Fillion was able to find a loose puck right in front of the goal, kick it to his stick and fire it past Fowler in one motion. A few minutes later, as BC was moving the puck up the ice, Collin Graf was given a minor for interference on a fairly controversial play. It took a minute for Leonard to get the puck behind the Bobcat cage and wrap it around for his second goal of the game. Just seconds later, Drew Fortescue was given a questionable penalty on what was considered a makeup call by the broadcast analyst. Quinnipiac get set up in the offensive zone and remained their most of the power play but they could not find any clear lanes to the net and didn't get a shot on goal for almost a minute. BC was able to hold on and make it to the buzzer without allowing a further goal.

With just 18 second left in their man-advantage, Quinnipiac quickly got into the BC zone and got the puck to Graf at the right point. He fired a shot that missed the net but bounced out the other side right to Quillan, who fired it from a very sharp angle into the net. The Eagles tried to get back to their game afterwards but several possessions were cancelled out by turnovers or solid defensive play from the Bobcats. After a few minutes, Boston College settled down and began applying pressure on Duplessis. On a counterattack at the 5-minute mark, Fowler made a save but the puck bounced to Fillion, who had a half-open net. He hesitated for a half-second before shooting but in that time the puck rolled off of the toe of his stick and the shot went wide. Quinnipiac took over after the near-miss and combination of speed and physical play to not only prevent the Eagles from getting a good shot on Duplessis but also generate further chances for themselves. Rather than slow the game down, Quinnipiac kept their pace high and force Boston College to try and get through a tight-checking defense without time to think. Seemingly, the best BC was able to do was get a single shot on goal before the Bobcats closed ranks and either cleared the zone or got a stop from their goalie. Quinnipiac's suffocating defense allowed just 3 shots to the Eagles through 14 minutes and even when the Bobcats made a mistake with the puck, fortune had the puck slide away from an Eagle player, or hop over a stick. With under 5 minutes to play, Boston College finally managed to do something with a turnover and Aram Minnetian tied the game with a laser from the high slot. A few minutes later, the BC faithful were up in arms when a trip on Smith went uncalled and Quinnipiac got back to their offensive game. The game sped up even more in the final few minutes but the choppy ice seemed to interfere with several rushes. BC made a furious charge at the end but time ran out before the winning goal could be scored.

At the start of overtime, Boston College had trouble getting out of their own zone. Turnovers, forechecking and icings hemmed the Eagles in their defensive zone for most of the first two minutes and forced Greg Brown to call a timeout to give his team a breather. The Eagles were finally able to break through the Bobcats' defense at around the 4-minute mark and a shot from the point was tipped in on Duplessis. The goaltender lost his balance and was unable to freeze the puck. Cristophe Tellier tried to clear the puck but it went right to the stick of Jack Malone who fired it between the legs of McGee for the winning goal.

== Scoring statistics ==
Name	Position	Games	Goals	Assists	Points	PIM
Collin Graf	C/RW	34	22	27	49	4
Jacob Quillan	C	39	17	29	46	16
Mason Marcellus	C	39	14	22	36	18
Sam Lipkin	C/LW	39	15	20	35	37
Andon Cerbone	F	39	12	14	26	23
Cristophe Tellier	LW	39	7	19	26	12
Jayden Lee	D	39	3	23	26	8
Travis Treloar	C	30	12	12	24	14
Charles-Alexis Legault	D	39	9	15	24	53
Davis Pennington	D	39	3	21	24	14
Cooper Moore	D	39	3	19	22	26
Zach Tupker	C	39	6	15	21	24
Christophe Fillion	F	39	12	7	19	29
Victor Czerneckianair	C	39	7	7	14	12
Anthony Cipollone	F	36	7	6	13	2
Ilvari Räsänen	D	39	4	7	11	16
C. J. McGee	D	39	2	7	9	33
Alex Power	C	31	4	5	9	2
Matthew McGroarty	F	22	1	5	6	10
Timothy Heinke	RW	6	0	1	1	0
Jake Martin	D	25	0	1	1	0
Vinny Duplessis	G	30	0	0	0	0
Noah Altman	G	3	0	0	0	0
Chase Ramsay	D	4	0	0	0	0
Matej Marinov	G	11	0	0	0	0
Nicky Wallace	D	2	0	0	0	0
Total			160	282	442	371

== Goaltending statistics ==
Name	Games	Minutes	Wins	Losses	Ties	Goals against	Saves	Shut outs	SV %	GAA
Noah Altman	3	9:52	0	0	0	0	4	0	1.000	0.00
Matej Marinov	11	550:41	6	3	0	17	178	1	.913	1.85
Vinny Duplessis	30	1814:10	21	7	2	61	652	3	.914	2.02
Empty Net	-	10:10	-	-	-	1	-	-	-	-
Total	39	2384:53	27	10	2	79	834	4	.913	1.99

== Rankings ==
Poll	Week																										
Poll	Pre	1	2	3	4	5	6	7	8	9	10	11	12	13	14	15	16	17	18	19	20	21	22	23	24	25	26 (Final)
USCHO.com	2 (22)	5	4 (2)	5	8	10	7 (1)	3 (8)	5	5 (3)	3 (5)	–	3 (2)	5	3 (2)	7	7	5	9	7	7	7	7	6	8	–	6
USA Hockey	3 (12)	4	4	5	7	10	7	3 (8)	4	4 (3)	3 (1)	3 (1)	–	5	3	8	7	5	9	7	7	7	7	6	8	6	6

Note: USCHO did not release a poll in weeks 11 and 25.
Note: USA Hockey did not release a poll in week 12.

== Awards and honors ==
Player	Award	Ref
Collin Graf	AHCA East Second Team All-American	
Collin Graf	ECAC Hockey Player of the Year	
Jacob Quillan	ECAC Hockey Best Defensive Forward	
Jayden Lee	ECAC Hockey First Team	
Collin Graf	ECAC Hockey First Team	
Jacob Quillan	ECAC Hockey Second Team	
Sam Lipkin	ECAC Hockey Second Team	
Vinny Duplessis	ECAC Hockey Third Team	
Mason Marcellus	ECAC Hockey Rookie Team	

== 2024 NHL entry draft ==
Round	Pick	Player	NHL team
4	110	Elliott Groenewold ^{†}	Boston Bruins

† incoming freshman
