= Trey Taylor (ice hockey) =

Canadian ice hockey player (born 2002)

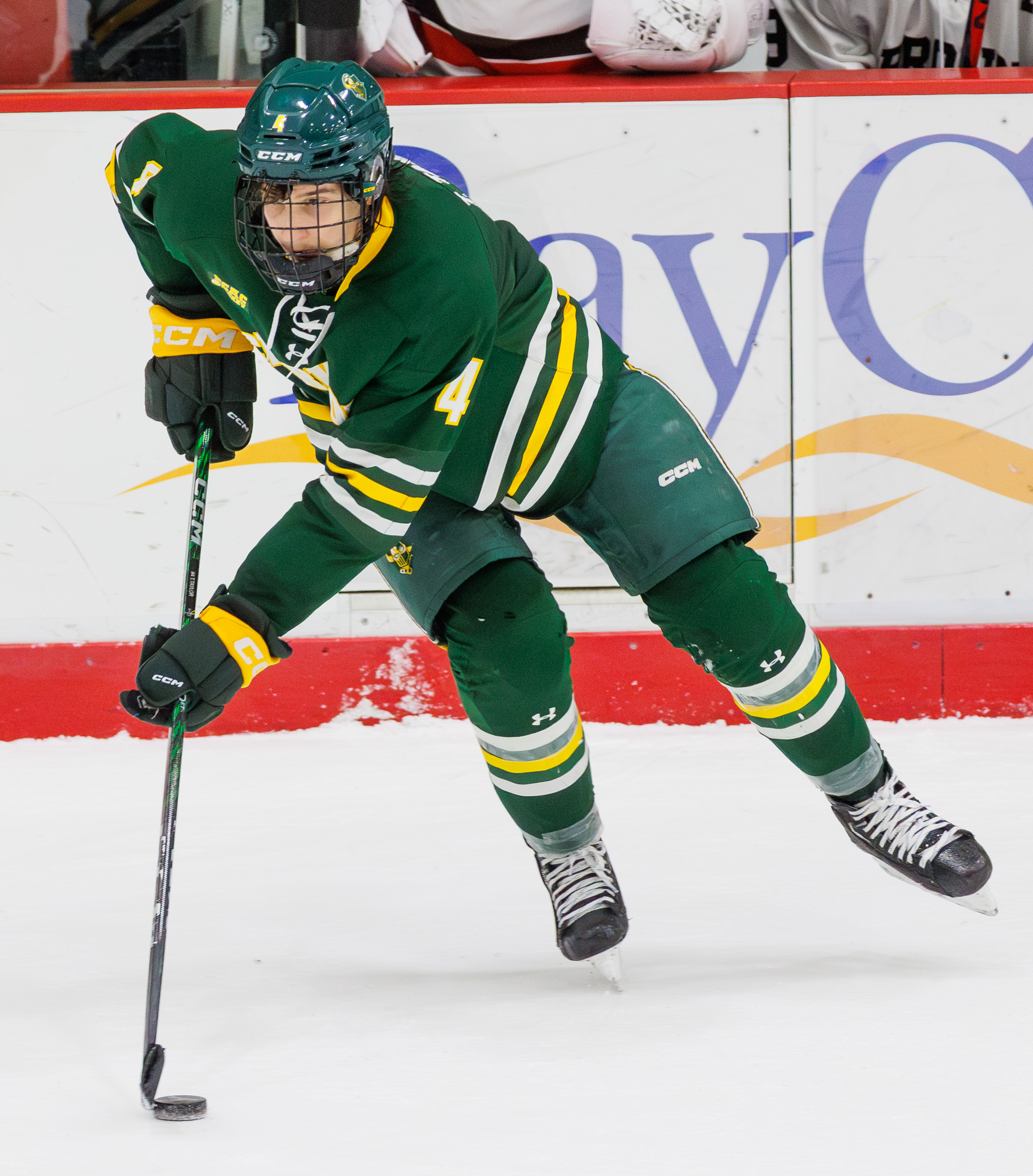
- Taylor with the Golden Knights in 2023
- Born: February 4, 2002 (age 24) Richmond, British Columbia, Canada
- Height: 6 ft 2 in (188 cm)
- Weight: 196 lb (89 kg; 14 st 0 lb)
- Position: Defence
- Shoots: Left
- NHL team (P) Cur. team: Dallas Stars; Texas Stars (AHL)
- NHL draft: Undrafted
- Playing career: 2025–present

Trey Taylor (born February 4, 2002) is a Canadian professional ice hockey defenceman for the Texas Stars of the American Hockey League (AHL), while under contract to the Dallas Stars of the National Hockey League (NHL). He played college ice hockey at Clarkson.

== Playing career ==
=== College ===
Taylor began his collegiate career for Clarkson during the 2022–23 season. During his freshman year he recorded three goals and five assists in 36 games. During the 2023–24 season, in his sophomore year, he recorded four goals and 13 assists in 35 games. He led all defencemen on the team in points and led the team in shots (86) and blocked shots (65). Following the season he was named to the All-ECAC Second Team and the ECAC Hockey Best Defensive Defenseman.

During the 2024–25 season, in his junior year, he served as team captain and recorded a career-high nine goals and 20 assists in 39 games. He led all defencemen on the team in scoring. Following the season he was named to the All-ECAC First Team and the ECAC Hockey Best Defensive Defenseman for the second consecutive year. He finished his collegiate career with 16 goals and 38 assists in 110 games.

=== Professional ===
On March 24, 2025, Taylor signed a two-year, entry-level contract with the Dallas Stars of the NHL, beginning during the 2025–26 season. He was assigned to the Stars' AHL affiliate, the Texas Stars, for the remainder of the 2024–25 season.

== Personal life ==
Taylor was born to Mervyn and Julia Taylor, and has three brothers, Ty, Tate and Teyce. Ty played college ice hockey at New Hampshire.

== Career statistics ==
			Regular season					Playoffs
Season	Team	League	GP	G	A	Pts	PIM	GP	G	A	Pts	PIM
2018–19	Vernon Vipers	BCHL	53	1	12	13	18	21	1	5	6	6
2019–20	Vernon Vipers	BCHL	52	6	11	17	16	5	1	0	1	6
2020–21	Vernon Vipers	BCHL	16	0	7	7	2	—	—	—	—	—
2021–22	Youngstown Phantoms	USHL	36	3	5	8	18	—	—	—	—	—
2022–23	Clarkson University	ECAC	36	3	5	8	18	—	—	—	—	—
2023–24	Clarkson University	ECAC	35	4	13	17	27	—	—	—	—	—
2024–25	Clarkson University	ECAC	39	9	20	29	12	—	—	—	—	—
2024–25	Texas Stars	AHL	10	0	1	1	0	14	1	5	6	2
2025–26	Texas Stars	AHL	70	8	18	26	34	5	0	0	0	2
AHL totals			80	8	19	27	34	19	1	5	6	4

== Awards and honors ==
Award	Year
College
All-ECAC Second Team	2024
ECAC Hockey Best Defensive Defenseman	2024, 2025
All-ECAC First Team	2025
AHCA East Second Team All-American	2025

Awards and achievements
Preceded by Henry Thrun	ECAC Hockey Best Defensive Defenseman; 2023–24, 2024–25	Succeeded by Incumbent
