= 2023–24 St. Lawrence Saints men's ice hockey season =

- Conference: 7th ECAC Hockey
- Home ice: Appleton Arena

Rankings
- USCHO: NR
- USA Hockey: NR

Record
- Overall: 14–19–6
- Conference: 8–10–4
- Home: 10–5–2
- Road: 3–13–4
- Neutral: 1–1–0

Coaches and captains
- Head coach: Brent Brekke
- Assistant coaches: Tommy Hill; Mike Aikens; Cam Doomany
- Captains: Josh Boyer; Justin Paul; Luc Salem

The 2023–24 St. Lawrence Saints Men's ice hockey season was the 84th season of play for the program and the 63rd in ECAC Hockey. The Saints represented St. Lawrence University, played their home games at the Appleton Arena and were coached by Brent Brekke in his 5th season.

== Season ==
St. Lawrence was well-positioned entering the 2023–24 season, as almost the entire team returned from the previous year. The only real question was in goal, where grad transfer Ben Kraws was expected to take over the starting role. However, once the season started, it became apparent that the Larries had lost something; the defense was unable to shield their goaltender. Kraws played credibly in goal but he came under siege from a barrage of opposing chances. The Saints were allowing an average of more than 32 shots against per game, more than 5 over what they had the year before and one of the worst marks in the nation. Kraws played about as well as could be expected but, with the offense not providing much support the Larries won just three times in their first fourteen games.

After a poor showing in the first two months, St. Lawrence began to turn things around in December. Several good defensive performances in December and January allowed the Saints to win some of their conference games and climb into the middle of the standings. The Larries had an outside chance at earning a bye into the conference quarterfinals but a minor slump from the back end caused that opportunity to slip by the wayside. St. Lawrence stumbled to the finish, winning only two of their final ten games.

Even with the slide down the home stretch, the Larries were able to earn a home stand for the opening round of the postseason and opened against Yale. The defense did Kraws no favors, allowing 39 shots in the game, but stopped enough to allow the offense to carry the day in the final home game of the season. The next week sent the Larries to meet Colgate and, at times, the team looked completely outclassed. The Raiders ran over the Saints in the first period, outshooting St. Lawrence 17–3 but Kraws stood his ground. A strong second period gave the team a 2-goal lead but a regressing in the third saw Colgate tie the game and force overtime. Kraws was absolutely key in extra time, stopping 16 shots in over 27 minutes of play. His stellar goaltending allowed Luc Salem to fire a bouncing puck from the blueline through a maze of bodies for the winning goal. The rematch saw Colgate come storming out of the gate and completely dominate the first period once more. This time, the Larries fell down by a goal but, once more, a solid middle period saw St. Lawrence take a lead into the third. A power play goal by the Raiders tied the score but, just a few minutes afterwards, a goal from Jan Olenginski on a breakaway restored the lead for the Larries and they rode Kraws the rest of the way to victory.

In the semifinals, St. Lawrence faced Quinnipiac, the defending NCAA national champions. The Larries' defense limited the Bobcats to just 22 shots, which were all stopped by Ben Kraws. For the third consecutive game, St. Lawrence scored two in the second and that was more than enough to carry them to victory. With the Saints now just one win from the NCAA tournament, St. Lawrence entered the game with Cornell looking for a major upset. However, with the Big Red also fighting for their season, the Larries knew they would not have an easy challenge. The Saints played well but they were stymied by one of the best defensive teams in the nation. While Cornell was able to score in each period, St. Lawrence could only get a single marker in the third and saw their miracle run end just shy of a league championship and their first NCAA appearance since 2007.

== Departures ==
Player	Position	Nationality	Cause
Francis Boisvert	Goaltender	Canada	Graduate transfer to Robert Morris
Ashton Fry	Forward	United States	Graduation (retired)
Tim Makowski	Defenseman	United States	Graduation (retired)
Aleksi Peltonen	Forward	Finland	Graduation (signed with HC Davos)
Jordan Steinmetz	Forward	United States	Graduate transfer to Minnesota State
Emil Zetterquist	Goaltender	Sweden	Graduation (signed with Västerviks IK)

== Recruiting ==
Player	Position	Nationality	Age	Notes
Ben Kraws	Goaltender	United States	23	Cranbury, NJ; graduate transfer from Arizona State
Mason Kucenski	Goaltender	United States	21	Gill, MA
Jake Lammens	Defenseman	United States	20	Norwalk, CT
Evan Mitchell	Defenseman	Canada	21	Kanata, ON
Jan Olenginski	Defenseman	United States	20	Philadelphia, PA
Cameron Smith	Goaltender	United States	21	Westchester, NY
Gunnar Thoreson	Forward	United States	21	Andover, MN

== Roster ==
As of September 19, 2023.

No.	Nat.	Player	Class	Pos	Height	Weight	DoB	Hometown	Previous team	NHL rights
1	(United States)	Cameron Smith	Freshman	G	6' 2" (1.88 m)	175 lb (79 kg)	2002-01-21	Westchester, New York	P.A.L. Jr. Islanders (NCDC)	—
2	(United States)	Anthony Mollica	Sophomore	D	6' 3" (1.91 m)	215 lb (98 kg)	2001-06-07	Hudsonville, Michigan	New Jersey Titans (NAHL)	—
3	(United States)	Luke Erickson	Senior	D	6' 2" (1.88 m)	210 lb (95 kg)	1999-04-15	Woodbury, Minnesota	Fairbanks Ice Dogs (NAHL)	—
4	(Canada)	Mason Waite	Junior	D	6' 1" (1.85 m)	200 lb (91 kg)	2000-04-04	Winnipeg, Manitoba	Prince George Spruce Kings (BCHL)	—
7	(United States)	Luc Salem (C)	Senior	D	5' 10" (1.78 m)	180 lb (82 kg)	1999-07-09	Santa Monica, California	Topeka Pilots (NAHL)	—
8	(Canada)	Oak MacLeod	Junior	F	5' 10" (1.78 m)	180 lb (82 kg)	2002-04-04	Caledonia, Ontario	Jersey Hitmen (NCDC)	—
9	(Canada)	Philippe Chapleau	Junior	D	5' 9" (1.75 m)	180 lb (82 kg)	2000-07-06	Longueuil, Quebec	Penticton Vees (BCHL)	—
10	(Czech Republic)	Tomáš Mazura	Junior	F	6' 4" (1.93 m)	200 lb (91 kg)	2000-09-23	Sezemice, Czech Republic	Providence (HEA)	EDM, 162nd overall 2019
11	(United States)	Will Arquiett	Junior	F	5' 8" (1.73 m)	170 lb (77 kg)	2000-06-25	Brasher Falls, New York	Aberdeen Wings (NAHL)	—
12	(Canada)	Greg Lapointe	Junior	F	5' 9" (1.75 m)	175 lb (79 kg)	2001-01-01	Granby, Quebec	Coquitlam Express (BCHL)	—
14	(Canada)	Justin Paul (C)	Senior	F	5' 11" (1.8 m)	188 lb (85 kg)	2000-04-10	Thunder Bay, Ontario	Wellington Dukes (OJHL)	—
15	(Canada)	Evan Mitchell	Freshman	D	5' 11" (1.8 m)	185 lb (84 kg)	2002-02-13	Winnipeg, Manitoba	Cranbrook Bucks (BCHL)	—
16	(Canada)	Drake Burgin	Junior	D	5' 11" (1.8 m)	180 lb (82 kg)	2000-10-22	Kanata, Ontario	Blackfalds Bulldogs (AJHL)	—
17	(United States)	Reilly Moran	Senior	F	5' 11" (1.8 m)	176 lb (80 kg)	2000-04-24	Hingham, Massachusetts	Powell River Kings (BCHL)	—
18	(Canada)	Tyler Cristall	Sophomore	F	5' 9" (1.75 m)	170 lb (77 kg)	2002-05-13	Vancouver, British Columbia	West Kelowna Warriors (NAHL)	—
19	(United States)	Max Dorrington	Senior	F	6' 3" (1.91 m)	220 lb (100 kg)	2001-08-30	North Reading, Massachusetts	Cushing Academy (USHS–MA)	—
20	(United States)	Nicholas Trela	Senior	F	6' 2" (1.88 m)	185 lb (84 kg)	1999-08-26	Trenton, Michigan	Amarillo Bulls (NAHL)	—
21	(United States)	Cameron Buhl	Graduate	F	5' 10" (1.78 m)	170 lb (77 kg)	1998-12-03	South St. Paul, Minnesota	Minnesota Magicians (NAHL)	—
22	(Canada)	Ty Naaykens	Junior	F	6' 1" (1.85 m)	185 lb (84 kg)	2001-01-27	Winnipeg, Manitoba	Fairbanks Ice Dogs (NAHL)	—
23	(United States)	Jan Olenginski	Freshman	F	5' 9" (1.75 m)	165 lb (75 kg)	2003-03-23	Philadelphia, Pennsylvania	Madison Capitols (USHL)	—
24	(Canada)	Tucker McIntosh	Senior	D	6' 1" (1.85 m)	185 lb (84 kg)	2001-05-20	Toronto, Ontario	Ottawa Jr. Senators (CCHL)	—
25	(Latvia)	Fēlikss Gavars	Sophomore	F	5' 11" (1.8 m)	184 lb (83 kg)	2002-05-15	Riga, Latvia	Fargo Force (USHL)	—
26	(United States)	Jake Lammens	Freshman	D	6' 1" (1.85 m)	185 lb (84 kg)	2002-10-03	Norwalk, Connecticut	Salmon Arm Silverbacks (BCHL)	—
27	(United States)	Logan Ritchie	Senior	F	5' 11" (1.8 m)	180 lb (82 kg)	1999-07-27	O'Fallon, Missouri	Kenai River Brown Bears (NAHL)	—
28	(United States)	Josh Boyer (C)	Graduate	F	6' 3" (1.91 m)	200 lb (91 kg)	1999-10-07	Wasilla, Alaska	Omaha (NCHC)	—
29	(United States)	Gunnar Thoreson	Freshman	F	5' 10" (1.78 m)	185 lb (84 kg)	2002-03-19	Andover, Minnesota	Minnesota Wilderness (NAHL)	—
32	(United States)	Mason Kucenski	Freshman	G	6' 3" (1.91 m)	175 lb (79 kg)	2002-04-08	Gill, Massachusetts	Madison Capitols (USHL)	—
33	(United States)	Ben Kraws	Graduate	G	6' 5" (1.96 m)	195 lb (88 kg)	2000-08-02	Cranbury, New Jersey	Arizona State (NCAA)	—
34	(Slovakia)	Ján Lašák	Sophomore	F	6' 1" (1.85 m)	200 lb (91 kg)	2002-08-11	Šurany, Slovakia	Janesville Jets (NAHL)	—
35	(United States)	Grant Adams	Senior	G	6' 2" (1.88 m)	195 lb (88 kg)	2000-09-22	South Bend, Indiana	Salmon Arm Silverbacks (BCHL)	—

== Standings ==
2023–24 ECAC Hockey Standings
	Conference record										Overall record					
	GP	W	L	T	OTW	OTL	SW	PTS	GF	GA	GP	W	L	T	GF	GA
#6 Quinnipiac †	22	17	4	1	0	2	0	54	99	39	39	27	10	2	160	79
#9 Cornell *	22	12	6	4	1	2	3	44	74	45	35	22	7	6	115	65
Colgate	22	13	7	2	2	2	2	43	85	68	36	16	16	4	120	112
Dartmouth	22	9	6	7	1	1	3	37	66	60	32	13	10	9	92	91
Clarkson	22	12	9	1	4	2	1	36	62	58	35	18	16	1	95	97
Union	22	9	10	3	1	1	2	32	75	75	37	16	18	3	123	121
St. Lawrence	22	8	10	4	1	1	1	29	49	64	39	14	19	6	90	118
Harvard	22	6	10	6	1	2	3	28	49	64	32	7	19	6	70	106
Princeton	22	8	11	3	4	0	2	25	70	90	30	10	16	4	89	114
Yale	22	7	13	2	1	2	1	25	46	57	30	10	18	2	63	91
Brown	22	6	14	2	2	3	1	22	43	69	30	8	19	3	61	98
Rensselaer	22	6	13	3	0	0	0	21	58	89	37	10	23	4	93	150
Championship: March 23, 2024 † indicates conference regular season champion (Cleary Cup) * indicates conference tournament champion (Whitelaw Cup); Rankings: USCHO.com Top 20 Poll

== Schedule and results ==
Date	Time	Opponent^{#}	Rank^{#}	Site	TV	Decision	Result	Attendance	Record
Regular Season
October 7	6:00 pm	RIT*		Appleton Arena • Canton, New York	ESPN+	Kraws	W 4–3	2,053	1–0–0
October 13	7:00 pm	Vermont*		Appleton Arena • Canton, New York	ESPN+	Adams	L 1–3	1,076	1–1–0
October 14	7:00 pm	#18 Penn State*		Appleton Arena • Canton, New York	ESPN+	Kraws	L 1–4	1,223	1–2–0
October 22	2:00 pm	at Merrimack*		J. Thom Lawler Rink • North Andover, Massachusetts	ESPN+	Kraws	L 2–5	2,087	1–3–0
October 27	7:00 pm	Michigan Tech*		Appleton Arena • Canton, New York	ESPN+	Kraws	T 2–2 ^{OT}	1,073	1–3–1
October 28	7:00 pm	Lake Superior State*		Appleton Arena • Canton, New York	ESPN+	Kraws	L 2–5	—	1–4–1
November 3	7:00 pm	at Ferris State*		Ewigleben Arena • Big Rapids, Michigan	FloHockey	Kraws	W 5–2	1,640	2–4–1
November 4	7:00 pm	at Ferris State*		Ewigleben Arena • Big Rapids, Michigan	FloHockey	Kraws	L 1–2 ^{OT}	1,712	2–5–1
November 10	7:00 pm	Union		Appleton Arena • Canton, New York	ESPN+	Kraws	L 3–4	1,150	2–6–1 (0–1–0)
November 11	7:00 pm	Rensselaer		Appleton Arena • Canton, New York	ESPN+	Kraws	W 6–3	1,386	3–6–1 (1–1–0)
November 17	7:00 pm	at Yale		Ingalls Rink • New Haven, Connecticut	ESPN+	Kraws	L 0–5	1,368	3–7–1 (1–2–0)
November 18	7:00 pm	at Brown		Meehan Auditorium • Providence, Rhode Island	ESPN+	Kraws	L 1–2	673	3–8–1 (1–3–0)
November 24	7:00 pm	at #15 Western Michigan*		Lawson Arena • Kalamazoo, Michigan		Kraws	L 1–5	2,340	3–9–1
November 25	7:00 pm	at #15 Western Michigan*		Lawson Arena • Kalamazoo, Michigan		Kraws	L 0–4	2,245	3–10–1
December 1	7:00 pm	Dartmouth		Appleton Arena • Canton, New York	ESPN+	Kraws	W 3–1	1,012	4–10–1 (2–3–0)
December 2	7:00 pm	Harvard		Appleton Arena • Canton, New York	ESPN+	Kraws	W 2–0	1,110	5–10–1 (3–3–0)
December 8	7:00 pm	USNTDP		Appleton Arena • Canton, New York (Exhibition)	ESPN+	Kucenski	L 4–8	1,154	
December 30	7:00 pm	Ottawa*		Appleton Arena • Canton, New York (Exhibition)	ESPN+	Kucenski	W 5–2	830	
January 5	7:00 pm	at Canisius*		LECOM Harborcenter • Buffalo, New York	FloHockey	Kraws	L 1–5	792	5–11–1
January 6	5:05 pm	at #18 RIT*		Gene Polisseni Center • Henrietta, New York	FloHockey	Kraws	T 1–1 ^{OT}	2,816	5–11–2
January 12	7:00 pm	at Rensselaer		Houston Field House • Troy, New York	ESPN+	Kraws	L 3–6	1,600	5–12–2 (3–4–0)
January 13	4:00 pm	at Union		Achilles Rink • Schenectady, New York	ESPN+	Kraws	T 2–2 ^{SOL}	1,684	5–12–3 (3–4–1)
January 19	7:00 pm	Brown		Appleton Arena • Canton, New York	ESPN+	Kraws	W 2–1	914	6–12–3 (4–4–1)
January 20	7:00 pm	Yale		Appleton Arena • Canton, New York	ESPN+	Kraws	W 4–2	1,230	7–12–3 (5–4–1)
January 26	7:00 pm	at Clarkson		Cheel Arena • Potsdam, New York (Rivalry)	ESPN+	Kraws	L 1–4	3,602	7–13–3 (5–5–1)
January 27	7:00 pm	Clarkson		Appleton Arena • Canton, New York (Rivalry)	ESPN+	Kraws	W 2–1	2,826	8–13–3 (6–5–1)
February 2	7:00 pm	at #13 Cornell		Lynah Rink • Ithaca, New York	ESPN+	Kraws	L 1–5	3,726	8–14–3 (6–6–1)
February 3	7:00 pm	at Colgate		Class of 1965 Arena • Hamilton, New York	ESPN+	Kraws	L 2–3	1,087	8–15–3 (6–7–1)
February 9	7:00 pm	#5 Quinnipiac		Appleton Arena • Canton, New York	ESPN+	Kraws	W 3–1	1,109	9–15–3 (7–7–1)
February 10	7:00 pm	Princeton		Appleton Arena • Canton, New York	ESPN+	Kraws	L 4–5 ^{OT}	1,168	9–16–3 (7–8–1)
February 16	7:00 pm	at Harvard		Bright-Landry Hockey Center • Boston, Massachusetts	ESPN+	Kraws	L 1–2	1,888	9–17–3 (7–9–1)
February 17	7:00 pm	at Dartmouth		Thompson Arena • Hanover, New Hampshire	ESPN+	Kraws	T 4–4 ^{SOL}	2,253	9–17–4 (7–9–2)
February 23	7:00 pm	Colgate		Appleton Arena • Canton, New York	ESPN+	Kraws	W 4–3 ^{OT}	1,328	10–17–4 (8–9–2)
February 24	7:00 pm	#11 Cornell		Appleton Arena • Canton, New York	ESPN+	Kraws	T 2–2 ^{SOL}	1,579	10–17–5 (8–9–3)
March 1	7:00 pm	at Princeton		Hobey Baker Memorial Rink • Princeton, New Jersey	ESPN+	Kraws	T 4–4 ^{SOW}	1,258	10–17–6 (8–9–4)
March 2	7:00 pm	at #7 Quinnipiac		M&T Bank Arena • Hamden, Connecticut	ESPN+	Kucenski	L 1–8	3,220	10–18–6 (8–10–4)
ECAC Hockey Tournament
March 8	7:00 pm	Yale*		Appleton Arena • Canton, New York (First Round)	ESPN+	Kraws	W 4–2	1,577	11–18–6
March 15	7:00 pm	at Colgate*		Class of 1965 Arena • Hamilton, New York (Quarterfinal Game 1)	ESPN+	Kraws	W 3–2 ^{2OT}	763	12–18–6
March 16	7:00 pm	at Colgate*		Class of 1965 Arena • Hamilton, New York (Quarterfinal Game 2)	ESPN+	Kraws	W 3–2	834	13–18–6
March 22	4:00 pm	vs. #6 Quinnipiac*		Herb Brooks Arena • Lake Placid, New York (Semifinal)	ESPN+	Kraws	W 3–0	4,015	14–18–6
March 23	5:00 pm	vs. Cornell*	#14	Herb Brooks Arena • Lake Placid, New York (Championship)	ESPN+	Kraws	L 1–3	4,912	14–19–6
*Non-conference game. ^{#}Rankings from USCHO.com Poll. All times are in Eastern Time. Source:

== Scoring statistics ==
Name	Position	Games	Goals	Assists	Points	PIM
Fēlikss Gavars	F	39	13	12	25	14
Drake Burgin	D	39	7	13	20	16
Tomáš Mazura	C	34	6	14	20	12
Mason Waite	D	39	4	16	20	14
Justin Paul	LW	37	7	12	19	10
Tyler Cristall	F	39	7	9	16	12
Philippe Chapleau	D	39	5	11	16	8
Ty Naaykens	F	39	7	7	14	45
Ján Lašák	RW	35	6	7	13	2
Josh Boyer	C	37	3	6	9	23
Reilly Moran	F	34	2	6	8	19
Luc Salem	D	38	3	5	8	30
Greg Lapointe	F	25	6	2	8	6
Nick Trela	F	28	2	5	7	10
Max Dorrington	F	35	2	5	7	29
Cameron Buhl	F	26	4	2	6	6
Jan Olenginski	D	23	3	2	5	8
Tucker McIntosh	D	34	0	5	5	12
Logan Ritchie	F	28	1	3	4	4
Gunnar Thoreson	C	27	2	2	4	2
Will Arquiett	F	30	0	3	3	12
Anthony Mollica	D	5	0	1	1	0
Jake Lammens	F	7	0	1	1	4
Luke Erickson	D	14	0	0	0	10
Mason Kucenski	G	2	0	0	0	0
Grant Adams	G	2	0	0	0	0
Oak MacLeod	RW	5	0	0	0	2
Ben Kraws	G	37	0	0	0	0
Evan Mitchell	D	1	0	0	0	0
Total			90	149	239	326

== Goaltending statistics ==
Name	Games	Minutes	Wins	Losses	Ties	Goals against	Saves	Shut outs	SV %	GAA
Ben Kraws	37	2239:41	14	17	6	93	1061	2	.919	2.49
Grant Adams	2	72:50	0	1	0	5	27	0	.844	4.12
Mason Kucenski	2	60:00	0	2	0	8	38	0	.826	8.00
Empty Net	-	33:28	-	-	-	12	-	-	-	-
Total	39	2405:59	14	19	6	118	1126	2	.905	2.94

== Rankings ==
Poll	Week																										
Poll	Pre	1	2	3	4	5	6	7	8	9	10	11	12	13	14	15	16	17	18	19	20	21	22	23	24	25	26 (Final)
USCHO.com	NR	NR	NR	NR	NR	NR	NR	NR	NR	NR	NR	–	NR	NR	NR	NR	NR	NR	NR	NR	NR	NR	NR	NR	NR	–	NR
USA Hockey	NR	NR	NR	NR	NR	NR	NR	NR	NR	NR	NR	NR	–	NR	NR	NR	NR	NR	NR	NR	NR	NR	NR	NR	NR	NR	NR

Note: USCHO did not release a poll in weeks 11 and 25.
Note: USA Hockey did not release a poll in week 12.

== Awards and honors ==
Player	Award	Ref
Ben Kraws	ECAC Hockey All-Tournament Team	
Tomáš Mazura	ECAC Hockey All-Tournament Team	
