= NCHC Defensive Forward of the Year =

- Sport: College ice hockey
- League: NCHC

History
- First award: 2014
- Most wins: Justin Richards (2)
- Most recent: Tyson Gross

The NCHC Defensive Forward of the Year is an annual award given out at the conclusion of the National Collegiate Hockey Conference regular season to the best defensive forward in the conference as voted by the coaches of each NCHC team.

The Defensive Forward of the Year was first awarded in 2014 and is a successor to the CCHA Best Defensive Forward award, which was temporarily discontinued after the first iteration of the conference dissolved due to the 2013–14 NCAA conference realignment.

== Award winners ==
| Year | Winner | School |
|---|---|---|
| 2013–14 | Nic Dowd | St. Cloud State |
| 2014–15 | Mark MacMillan | North Dakota |
| 2015–16 | Sean Kuraly | Miami |
| 2016–17 | Dominic Toninato | Minnesota–Duluth |
| 2017–18 | Rhett Gardner | North Dakota |
| 2018–19 | Justin Richards | Minnesota Duluth |
| 2019–20 | Justin Richards | Minnesota Duluth |
| 2020–21 | Shane Pinto | North Dakota |
| 2021–22 | Connor Ford | North Dakota |
| 2022–23 | Jami Krannila | St. Cloud State |
| 2023–24 | Noah Laba | Colorado College |
| 2024–25 | Tim Washe | Western Michigan |
| 2025–26 | Tyson Gross | St. Cloud State |

=== Winners by school ===
| School | Winners |
|---|---|
| North Dakota | 4 |
| Minnesota Duluth | 3 |
| St. Cloud State | 3 |
| Colorado College | 1 |
| Miami | 1 |
| Western Michigan | 1 |

== See also ==
- NCHC Awards
- Best Defensive Forward
