= Justin Richards (ice hockey) =

American ice hockey player

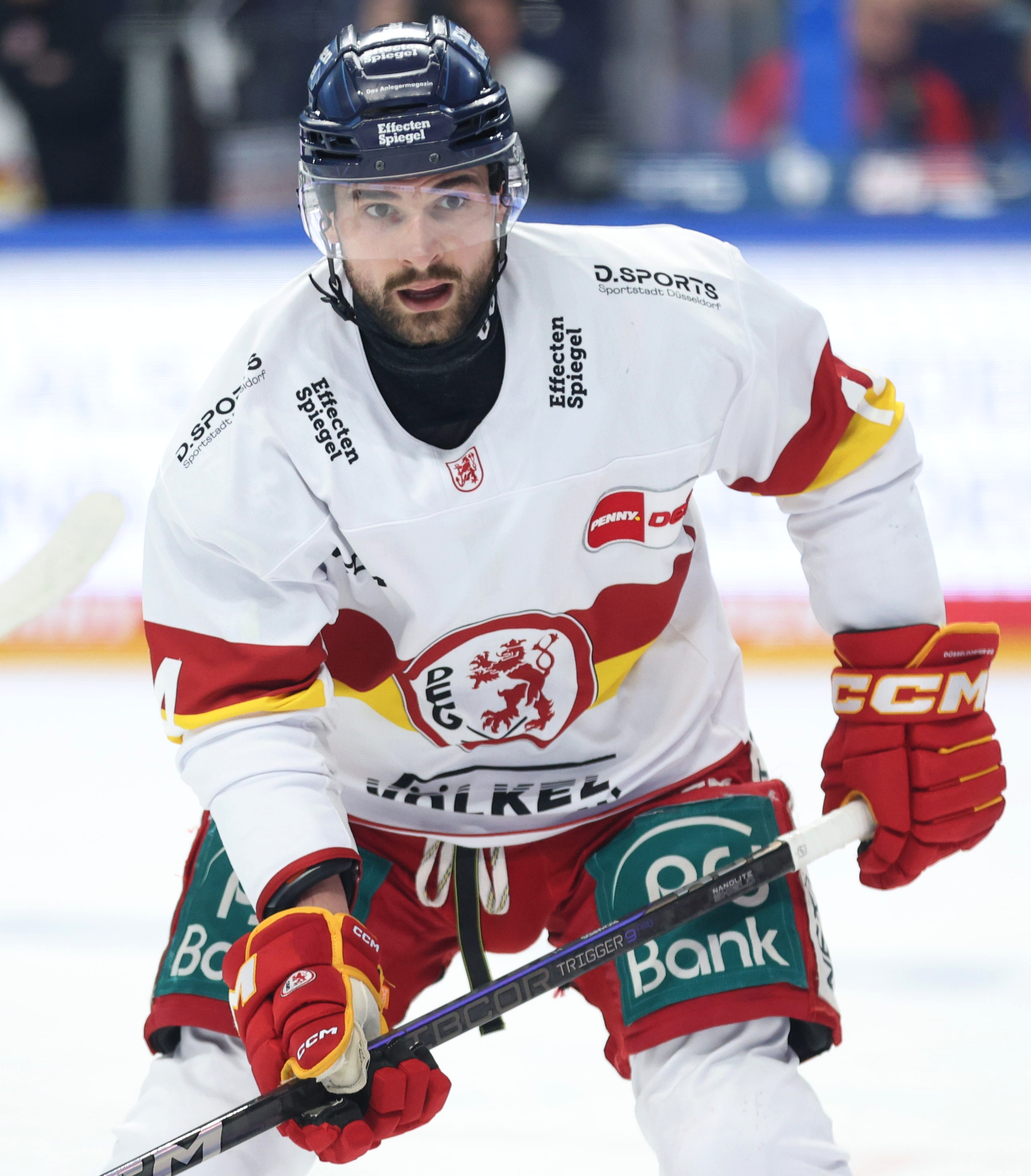
- Richards with the Düsseldorfer EG in 2025
- Born: March 17, 1998 (age 28) Orlando, Florida, U.S.
- Height: 5 ft 9 in (175 cm)
- Weight: 230 lb (104 kg; 16 st 6 lb)
- Position: Center
- Shoots: Right
- DEL team Former teams: Düsseldorfer EG; New York Rangers; Columbus Blue Jackets
- NHL draft: 1st Ovi
- Playing career: 2021–present

Justin Todd Richards (born March 17, 1998) is an American professional ice hockey forward for Düsseldorfer EG of the Deutsche Eishockey Liga (DEL).

== Playing career ==
Richards played college ice hockey at the University of Minnesota-Duluth. On April 2, 2020, Richards signed a two-year, entry-level contract with the New York Rangers of the National Hockey League (NHL). He spent the majority of the 2020–21 season with Hartford Wolf Pack of the American Hockey League (AHL), the Rangers' AHL affiliate. Richards made his NHL debut for the Rangers on May 8, 2021, against the Boston Bruins. Richards recorded his first NHL point in that game assisting on a goal by K'Andre Miller.

As a free agent from the Rangers following the 2021–22 season, Richards continued his professional career in the AHL, signing a one-year deal with the Cleveland Monsters, the primary affiliate of the Columbus Blue Jackets, on 29 August 2022. In the 2022–23 season, Richards emerged as an offensive leader with the Monsters, collecting 17 points through his first 23 games. He was signed to a one-year, two-way contract with the Columbus Blue Jackets on December 19, 2022. Richards made his Blue Jackets debut on April 1, 2023 against the Florida Panthers.

At the conclusion of his contract with the Blue Jackets, Richards was signed as a free agent to a one-year, two-way contract with the Buffalo Sabres on July 1, 2023.

Following his fourth professional season in North America, Richards as a free agent from the Sabres opted to pursue a career abroad in signing a one-year contract with German club, Düsseldorfer EG of the DEL, on August 6, 2024.

== Personal life ==
Richards is the son of former ice hockey player, Todd Richards, and is the nephew of Travis Richards.

== Career statistics ==
			Regular season					Playoffs
Season	Team	League	GP	G	A	Pts	PIM	GP	G	A	Pts	PIM
2015–16	Ohio Blue Jackets	T1EHL	32	11	28	39	18	4	4	6	10	2
2016–17	Lincoln Stars	USHL	59	10	20	30	63	—	—	—	—	—
2017–18	U. of Minnesota-Duluth	NCHC	44	0	9	9	6	—	—	—	—	—
2018–19	U. of Minnesota-Duluth	NCHC	42	12	20	32	18	—	—	—	—	—
2019–20	U. of Minnesota-Duluth	NCHC	34	14	11	25	14	—	—	—	—	—
2020–21	Hartford Wolf Pack	AHL	20	4	7	11	10	—	—	—	—	—
2020–21	New York Rangers	NHL	1	0	1	1	0	—	—	—	—	—
2021–22	Hartford Wolf Pack	AHL	67	6	8	14	23	—	—	—	—	—
2022–23	Cleveland Monsters	AHL	61	10	29	39	54	—	—	—	—	—
2022–23	Columbus Blue Jackets	NHL	2	0	1	1	0	—	—	—	—	—
2023–24	Rochester Americans	AHL	58	7	9	16	28	5	0	0	0	0
2024–25	Düsseldorfer EG	DEL	44	5	9	14	22	—	—	—	—	—
NHL totals			3	0	2	2	0	—	—	—	—	—

Awards and achievements
Preceded by Rhett Gardner	NCHC Defensive Forward of the Year; 2018–19, 2019–20	Succeeded by Shane Pinto
