= Tim Washe =

American ice hockey player (born 2001)

- Born: August 25, 2001 (age 25) Detroit, Michigan, United States
- Height: 6 ft 3 in (191 cm)
- Weight: 215 lb (98 kg; 15 st 5 lb)
- Position: Center
- Shoots: Left
- NHL team: Anaheim Ducks
- NHL draft: Undrafted
- Playing career: 2025–present

Tim Washe (born August 25, 2001) is an American professional ice hockey player who is a center for the Anaheim Ducks of the National Hockey League (NHL).

== Playing career ==
After playing junior hockey with the Nanaimo Clippers in 2020, Washe's career was put on hold during the pause caused by COVID-19 pandemic. After sitting on the sidelines for the first half of the following season, he joined his brother at Western Michigan, for the spring semester. Washe's college career began slow with him scoring a single goal in his abbreviated freshman season, however, because the 20–21 campaign would not count against his four years of eligibility, he would have plenty of time to round out his game.

As a fifth year graduate, Washe captained the 2024-25 Western Michigan Broncos Men's Ice Hockey. He was second on his team in points (16G-22A-38P), including 8 game winning goals, and was named the NCHC Defensive Forward of the Year. His four points in the NCAA tournament and two assists in the final game helped his team win the 2025 NCAA men's Division I Ice Hockey championship. Washe was named to the NCAA all-tournament first team.

On April 14, 2025, Washe signed a one year entry level contract with the Anaheim Ducks and appeared in two games before the end of the NHL season. At the conclusion of the 2024-25 season, the Ducks resigned Washe to a two year contract (two way 2025-26, one way 2026-27). As a member of the San Diego Gulls, Washe was named to the 2026 AHL All-star Classic. On January 16, 2026, Washe scored his first career NHL goal against the Los Angeles Kings.

== Career statistics ==
| | | | Regular season | | | | | Playoffs |
| Season | Team | League | GP | G | A | Pts | PIM | GP | G | A | Pts | PIM |
|---|---|---|---|---|---|---|---|---|---|---|---|---|
| 2019–20 | Nanaimo Clippers | BCHL | 55 | 10 | 9 | 19 | 95 | 4 | 2 | 1 | 3 | 6 |
| 2020–21 | Western Michigan | NCHC | 13 | 1 | 0 | 1 | 10 | — | — | — | — | — |
| 2021–22 | Western Michigan | NCHC | 39 | 2 | 3 | 5 | 16 | — | — | — | — | — |
| 2022–23 | Western Michigan | NCHC | 39 | 7 | 11 | 18 | 54 | — | — | — | — | — |
| 2022–23 | Western Michigan | NCHC | 38 | 2 | 10 | 12 | 27 | — | — | — | — | — |
| 2024–25 | Western Michigan | NCHC | 42 | 16 | 22 | 38 | 22 | — | — | — | — | — |
| 2024–25 | Anaheim Ducks | NHL | 2 | 0 | 0 | 0 | 0 | — | — | — | — | — |
| 2025–26 | San Diego Gulls | AHL | 36 | 14 | 13 | 27 | 28 | — | — | — | — | — |
| 2025–26 | Anaheim Ducks | NHL | 39 | 2 | 3 | 5 | 14 | 12 | 0 | 1 | 1 | 4 |
| NHL totals | | | 41 | 2 | 3 | 5 | 14 | 12 | 0 | 1 | 1 | 4 |

Awards and achievements
| Preceded by Noah Laba | NCHC Defensive Forward of the Year; 2024–25 | Succeeded by Tyson Gross |
