= Noah Laba =

American ice hockey player (born 2003)

- Born: August 4, 2003 (age 23) Northville, Michigan, U.S.
- Height: 6 ft 3 in (191 cm)
- Weight: 214 lb (97 kg; 15 st 4 lb)
- Position: Forward
- Catches: Right
- NHL team: New York Rangers
- NHL draft: 111th overall, 2022; New York Rangers
- Playing career: 2025–present

Noah Laba (born August 4, 2003) is an American professional ice hockey player who is a forward for the New York Rangers of the National Hockey League (NHL). He was drafted in the fourth round, 111th overall, by the Rangers in the 2022 NHL entry draft.

== Playing career ==
Laba spent two seasons with the Lincoln Stars of the United States Hockey League (USHL). During the 2020–21 season, he recorded nine goals and ten assists in 46 games. During the 2021–22 season, he recorded 15 goals and 24 assists in 50 games. He finished sixth on the team in points and tied for fifth in goals. Laba was drafted in the fourth round, 111th overall, by the New York Rangers in the 2022 NHL entry draft.

Laba began his collegiate career for Colorado College during the 2022–23 season. During his freshman year he recorded 11 goals and 11 assists in 35 games. His 22 points were the most by Tigers freshman since Bryan Yoon recorded 26 points during the 2018–19 season.

During the 2023–24 season, in his sophomore year, he recorded 20 goals and 17 assists in 36 games. During conference play, he led the NCHC with 16 goals and six game-winning goals. Laba led the NCHC with seven goals and three game-winning goals, all coming in overtime, to help Colorado College to a 6–2–0 record in January. He added three assists during the month for a ten-point January, averaging 1.25 points per game, and was named the NCHC Player of the Month for the month of January 2024. Following the season he was named the NCHC Defensive Forward of the Year, a All-NCHC First Team selection, and an AHCA West Second Team All-American.

Prior to the 2024–25 season, McKeen's Hockey rated him as the Rangers 7th best prospect, calling him a "prototypical, hard working, two-way center." Scout Jesse Rubenstein called him the Rangers best NCAA prospect, even ahead of 2023 first round draft pick Gabe Perreault, praising his scoring, defense and faceoff skills.

Following completion of his junior season, Laba concluded his collegiate career with the Tigers by signing a two-year, entry-level contract with the New York Rangers on March 19, 2025. He played in 11 games for the Rangers AHL affiliate Hartford Wolfpack, and scored 3 goals and had 2 assists. He scored a goal on a breakaway on his first professional shot on goal.

Prior to the 2025-26 season, Vincent Z. Mercogliano and Peter Baugh of The Athletic rated Laba as the Rangers' 6th best prospect. Laba described himself as "a two-way center with a 200-foot game who can play well defensively and play fast through the neutral zone.". He was included in the Rangers' opening night roster after a strong training camp. At the time, Rangers' coach Mike Sullivan said:

I think he physically is capable of playing at this level. He’s big and he’s strong, he brings good size. He can really skate…He’s probably provided evidence to himself that he belongs, and I think you can see it in his confidence when he’s on the ice. We think he’s had a terrific camp. I think Labs has proven to us that he’s very capable of playing at this level. I think his physical stature gives him an advantage because physically I think he’s as big and as strong to play against these guys. And this is a big and strong league.

He made his NHL debut for the Rangers on October 7, 2025 against the Pittsburgh Penguins. He recorded his first NHL points with 2 assists in a game against the Penguins on October 11, 2025. He scored his first NHL goal against the Calgary Flames on October 26, 2025. 30 games into his rookie season, Rangers coach Mike Sullivan said of him "He brings a speed element with his size and his strength. When he brings some physicality to his game I think he’s a lot more effective." Sullivan also acknowledged that Laba needs to improve his puck management.

== Personal life ==
Laba was born to Sarkis and Leslie Laba and has two brothers, Devin and Jaden, and two sisters, Nina and Ariana. His father is originally from Lebanon and immigrated to Windsor, Ontario in his teens.

== International play ==
Medal record

Representing United States

Ice hockey

World Junior Championships
Bronze medal – third place	2023 Canada	

On December 12, 2022, Laba was named to the United States men's national junior ice hockey team to compete at the 2023 World Junior Ice Hockey Championships. During the tournament he appeared in one game as an injury replacement for Tyler Boucher and won a bronze medal.

== Career statistics ==
=== Regular season and playoffs ===
			Regular season					Playoffs
Season	Team	League	GP	G	A	Pts	PIM	GP	G	A	Pts	PIM
2020–21	Lincoln Stars	USHL	46	9	10	19	72	—	—	—	—	—
2021–22	Lincoln Stars	USHL	50	15	24	39	115	1	1	0	1	2
2022–23	Colorado College	NCHC	35	11	11	22	48	—	—	—	—	—
2023–24	Colorado College	NCHC	36	20	17	37	27	—	—	—	—	—
2024–25	Colorado College	NCHC	29	10	16	26	25	—	—	—	—	—
2024–25	Hartford Wolf Pack	AHL	11	3	2	5	6	—	—	—	—	—
2025–26	New York Rangers	NHL	74	9	15	24	31	—	—	—	—	—
NHL totals			74	9	15	24	31	—	—	—	—	—

=== International ===
Year	Team	Event	Result	GP	G	A	Pts	PIM
2023	United States	WJC	3rd place, bronze medalist(s)	1	0	0	0	0
Junior totals				1	0	0	0	0

== Awards and honors ==
Award	Year
College
All-NCHC First Team	2024
NCHC Defensive Forward of the Year	2024
AHCA West Second Team All-American	2024

Awards and achievements
Preceded by Jami Krannila	NCHC Defensive Forward of the Year; 2023–24	Succeeded by Tim Washe
Preceded by Magnus Chrona	NCHC Three Stars Award; 2023–24	Succeeded by Artem Shlaine
