= Henry Thrun =

American ice hockey player (born 2001)

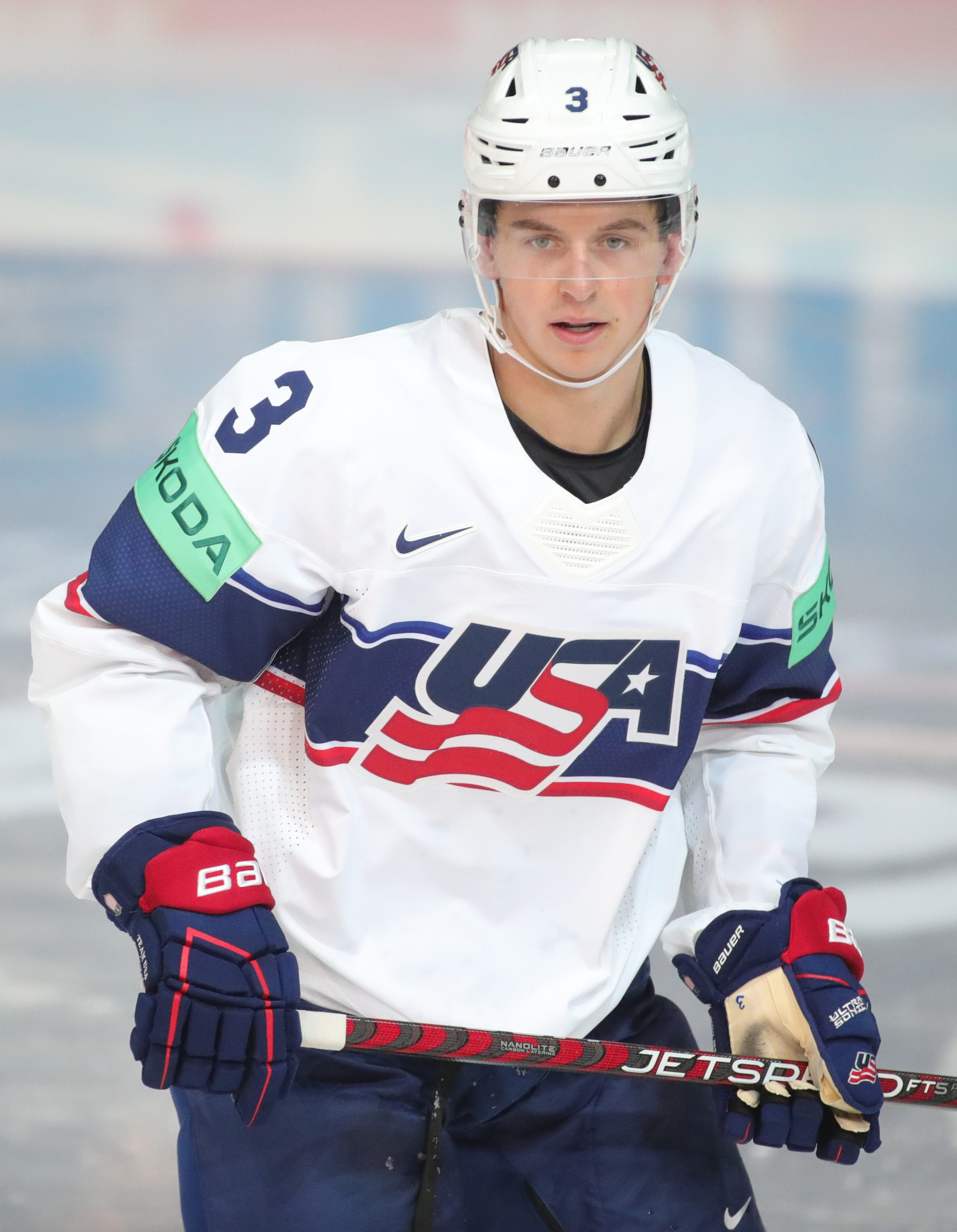
- Thrun with Team USA in May 2023
- Born: March 12, 2001 (age 25) Southborough, Massachusetts, U.S.
- Height: 6 ft 2 in (188 cm)
- Weight: 211 lb (96 kg; 15 st 1 lb)
- Position: Defense
- Shoots: Left
- NHL team Former teams: Winnipeg Jets; San Jose Sharks; Toronto Maple Leafs
- National team: United States
- NHL draft: 101st overall, 2019; Anaheim Ducks
- Playing career: 2023–present

Henry Thrun (born March 12, 2001) is an American professional ice hockey player who is a defenseman for the Winnipeg Jets of the National Hockey League (NHL). Thrun was drafted in the fourth round, 101st overall, by the Anaheim Ducks in the 2019 NHL entry draft.

== Early life ==
Thrun was born to David and Deborah Thrun and has an older brother, Will. He attended St. Mark's School in Southborough, Massachusetts for his first two years of high school before traveling to Michigan to train with the USA Hockey National Team Development Program (USNTDP) prior to his junior year. He then attended Northville High School, alongside Team USA teammate Matt Boldy, where he graduated summa cum laude.

== Playing career ==
Thrun joined the USNTDP for the 2017–18 season and recorded three goals and 17 assists in 32 games for the U-17 team. He returned to the USNTDP for the 2018–19 season and recorded four goals and 19 assists in 28 games.

=== College ===
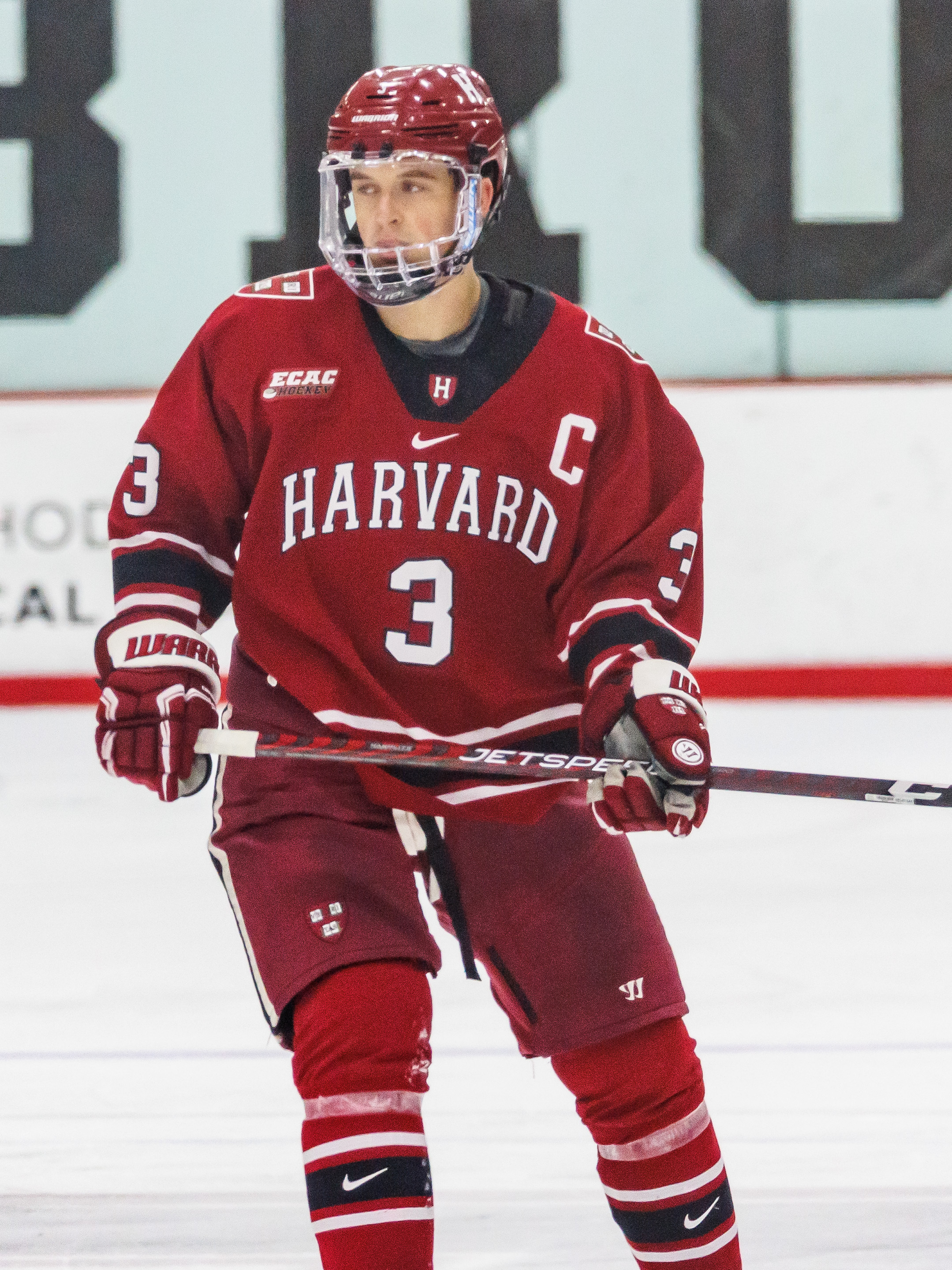
Thrun at Harvard

He began his collegiate career for the Harvard Crimson during the 2019–20 season. He scored his first career goal on November 1, 2019. During his freshman year he recorded three goals and 18 assists in 31 games, and led the team with a plus-17 rating. Following an outstanding season, he was named a finalist for the ECAC Hockey Best Defensive Defenseman and was named to the All-ECAC Rookie Team. After the Ivy League cancelled their season due to the COVID-19 pandemic, he played for the Dubuque Fighting Saints of the United States Hockey League (USHL) during the 2020–21 season. He recorded eight goals and 14 assists in 24 games for the Fighting Saints. His 0.92 points per game average ranked second among defensemen. Following the season he was named to All-USHL Third Team.

He returned to Harvard during the 2021–22 season. In his junior year he recorded seven goals and 25 assists in 35 games. He led all ECAC Hockey defensemen in per game scoring at 0.91 points per game, and ranked second in defensemen scoring with 27 points. Following an outstanding season he was named a finalist for the ECAC Hockey Best Defensive Defenseman, named to the All-ECAC Second Team and named an AHCA East Second Team All-American.

Thrun finished the 2022–23 season with seven goals and 24 assists in 33 games, leading all defenseman in the ECAC with 0.94 points per game. He finished the year with a plus-minus rating of +20. Thrun was named the ECAC Hockey Best Defensive Defenseman, as well as ECAC First-Team and an AHCA East First Team All-American.

After the conclusion of the Sharks' season, Thrun returned to Harvard to finish his bachelor's degree as a double major in economics and psychology.

=== Professional ===
On February 15, 2023, Thrun, notified the Anaheim Ducks that he intended to test free agency rather than sign with them when his rights expired in August 2023. Thrun's rights were subsequently traded to the San Jose Sharks on February 28. At the conclusion of his junior season with the Crimson, Thrun was signed by the Sharks to a two-year, entry-level contract on March 25, 2023, and joined the team immediately. Thrun played his first NHL game on March 23, 2023, against the Vegas Golden Knights, where he recorded two assists in the Sharks' 4–3 overtime victory.

Thrun scored his first career goal on January 9, 2024, the lone Sharks goal in a 7–1 loss to the Toronto Maple Leafs. On April 14, 2024, Thrun was voted 2023–24 Sharks Rookie of the Year by the Bay Area media. On July 24, 2024, he signed a two-year contract extension with the Sharks. During the 2024–25 season, he recorded two goals and ten assists in 60 games.

On July 10, 2025, Thrun was traded to the Toronto Maple Leafs in exchange for Ryan Reaves.

As a free agent after a lone season within the Maple Leafs organization, Thrun was signed to a one-year, two-way contract with the Winnipeg Jets for the 2026–27 season on July 4, 2026.

== International play ==
Medal record

Ice hockey

Representing United States

World Junior Championship
Gold medal – first place	2021 Canada	

IIHF World U18 Championship
Bronze medal – third place	2019 Sweden	

Thrun represented the United States at the 2019 IIHF World U18 Championships where he recorded one assist in seven games and won a bronze medal. He also represented the United States at the 2021 World Junior Ice Hockey Championships where he recorded one assist, and a plus-6 rating in seven games and won a gold medal.

== Career statistics ==
=== Regular season and playoffs ===
			Regular season					Playoffs
Season	Team	League	GP	G	A	Pts	PIM	GP	G	A	Pts	PIM
2017–18	U.S. National Development Team	USHL	2	0	0	0	0	—	—	—	—	—
2018–19	U.S. National Development Team	USHL	28	4	19	23	16	—	—	—	—	—
2019–20	Harvard University	ECAC	31	3	18	21	12	—	—	—	—	—
2020–21	Dubuque Fighting Saints	USHL	27	4	17	21	8	—	—	—	—	—
2021–22	Harvard University	ECAC	35	7	25	32	10	—	—	—	—	—
2022–23	Harvard University	ECAC	33	7	24	31	14	—	—	—	—	—
2022–23	San Jose Sharks	NHL	8	0	2	2	0	—	—	—	—	—
2023–24	San Jose Sharks	NHL	51	3	8	11	16	—	—	—	—	—
2023–24	San Jose Barracuda	AHL	18	1	5	6	10	—	—	—	—	—
2024–25	San Jose Sharks	NHL	60	2	10	12	30	—	—	—	—	—
2025–26	Toronto Marlies	AHL	55	5	18	23	37	24	2	7	9	6
2025–26	Toronto Maple Leafs	NHL	4	0	0	0	0	—	—	—	—	—
NHL totals			123	5	20	25	46	—	—	—	—	—

=== International ===
Year	Team	Event	Result	GP	G	A	Pts	PIM
2017	United States	U17	1st place, gold medalist(s)	5	0	2	2	0
2019	United States	U18	3rd place, bronze medalist(s)	7	0	1	1	0
2021	United States	WJC	1st place, gold medalist(s)	7	0	1	1	4
2023	United States	WC	4th	10	0	0	0	0
Senior totals				10	0	0	0	0
Junior totals				19	0	4	4	4

== Awards and honours ==
Award	Year	Ref
USHL
All-USHL Third Team	2021	
College
All-ECAC Rookie Team	2020	
All-ECAC Second Team	2022	
AHCA East Second Team All-American	2022	
All-ECAC First Team	2023	
ECAC Hockey Best Defensive Defenseman	2023	
AHCA East First Team All-American	2023	
AHL
Calder Cup champion	2026	

Awards and achievements
Preceded by Zach Metsa	ECAC Hockey Best Defensive Defenseman; 2022–23	Succeeded by Trey Taylor
