= Sam Morton (ice hockey) =

American ice hockey player (born 1999)

- Born: July 28, 1999 (age 26) Lafayette, Colorado, U.S.
- Height: 6 ft 0 in (183 cm)
- Weight: 190 lb (86 kg; 13 st 8 lb)
- Position: Center
- Shoots: Left
- NHL team (P) Cur. team: Calgary Flames; Calgary Wranglers (AHL)
- NHL draft: Undrafted
- Playing career: 2024–present

Sam Morton (born July 28, 1999) is an American professional ice hockey center for the Calgary Wranglers in the American Hockey League (AHL) while under contract to the Calgary Flames of the National Hockey League (NHL).

== Playing career ==
Morton played at the collegiate level at Minnesota State University, Mankato and Union College. He also played at the major junior level with the Wenatchee Wild of the British Columbia Hockey League (BCHL). Morton signed a one-year, two-way contract with the Flames on March 18, 2024. He played in his first NHL game on April 17, 2025, scoring a goal in a 5–1 victory against the Los Angeles Kings.

== Career statistics ==
			Regular season					Playoffs
Season	Team	League	GP	G	A	Pts	PIM	GP	G	A	Pts	PIM
2015–16	Colorado Thunderbirds	T1EHL	28	8	14	22	8	4	1	0	1	0
2016–17	Wenatchee Wild	BCHL	43	7	18	25	18	10	0	1	1	0
2017–18	Wenatchee Wild	BCHL	58	29	25	54	26	20	6	19	25	6
2018–19	Union College	ECAC	29	1	9	10	4	—	—	—	—	—
2019–20	Union College	ECAC	13	2	1	3	2	—	—	—	—	—
2019–20	Wenatchee Wild	BCHL	26	11	20	31	20	5	0	3	3	2
2020–21	Minnesota State	WCHA	17	5	4	9	6	—	—	—	—	—
2021–22	Minnesota State	CCHA	38	9	16	25	12	—	—	—	—	—
2022–23	Minnesota State	CCHA	10	6	2	8	2	—	—	—	—	—
2023–24	Minnesota State	CCHA	37	24	10	34	10	—	—	—	—	—
2023–24	Calgary Wranglers	AHL	13	5	2	7	4	6	3	1	4	6
2024–25	Calgary Wranglers	AHL	70	20	25	45	18	2	0	0	0	2
2024–25	Calgary Flames	NHL	1	1	0	1	0	—	—	—	—	—
2025–26	Calgary Wranglers	AHL	68	17	21	38	30	—	—	—	—	—
2025–26	Calgary Flames	NHL	3	0	0	0	10	—	—	—	—	—
NHL totals			4	1	0	1	10	—	—	—	—	—

== Awards and honors ==
Award	Year
College
NCAA All-Tournament Team	2022
CCHA First All-Star Team	2024
CCHA Forward of the Year	2024
CCHA Player of the Year	2024
Hobey Baker Finalist	2024
