= 2023–24 NCAA Division I men's ice hockey season =

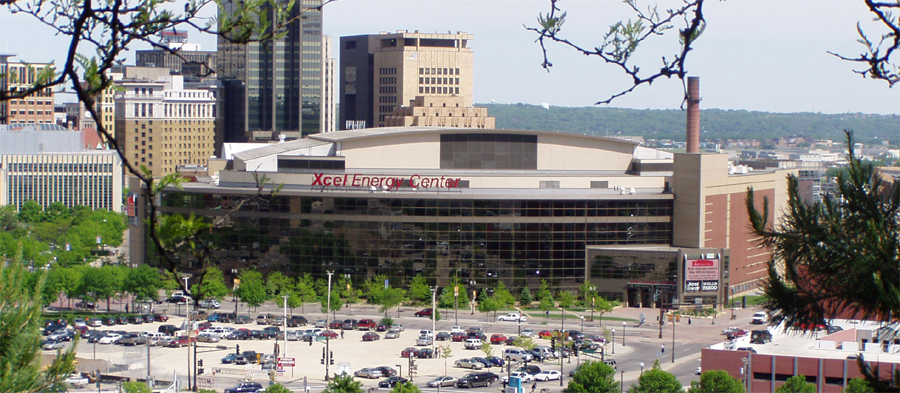
- Xcel Energy Center in Saint Paul, Minnesota hosted the 2024 Frozen Four.
- Duration: October 6, 2023– April 13, 2024
- NCAA tournament: 2024
- National championship: Xcel Energy Center; Saint Paul, Minnesota
- NCAA champion: Denver
- Hobey Baker Award: Macklin Celebrini (Boston University)

The 2023–24 NCAA Division I men's ice hockey season began on October 6, 2023, and concluded with the NCAA championship on April 13, 2024. This was the 76th season in which an NCAA ice hockey championship is being held, and is US college hockey's 130th year overall.

== Conference realignment ==
After Robert Morris suspended its program in the summer of 2021, a successful fundraising campaign allowed the team to return for this season. The program rejoined Atlantic Hockey, bringing the number of conference members back up to 11.

The same summer, Augustana University proceeded with plans to promote its athletic department to Division I. In concert with that decision, the school finalized the addition of a new ice hockey program that would begin with this season. In the interim, the program was accepted into the CCHA as the ninth member team and would play its first two seasons using a transition schedule before becoming a full member in 2025.

On June 6, 2023, the Atlantic Hockey Association and the women-only College Hockey America (CHA) announced that they would merge operations after the 2023–24 season. The two conferences had shared a commissioner and conference staff since 2010. The merger was officially finalized on April 30, 2024 with the merged conference unveiling its new identity as Atlantic Hockey America. All members of the Association and CHA became members of the new conference.

On July 5, 2023, Arizona State University was accepted as the ninth member of the National Collegiate Hockey Conference (NCHC) beginning with the 2024–2025 season. This marked the Sun Devils' final season as an independent program.

A future conference move was announced on May 15, 2024, with the NCHC announcing that the St. Thomas would join from the CCHA in 2026. This move coincides with the completion of UST's transition from NCAA Division III to Division I.

== Other headlines ==
- October 4, 2023 – The Division I Council approved changes to the transfer window for all sports. In winter sports other than basketball, including men's and women's ice hockey, the transfer portal now opens for a total of 45 days, starting 7 days after the NCAA tournament field is set.

== Regular season ==
=== Season tournaments ===
Tournament	Dates	Teams	Champion
Ice Breaker Tournament	October 13–14	4	North Dakota
Turkey Leg Classic	November 24–25	4	Merrimack
Great Lakes Invitational	December 28–29	4	Michigan Tech
Holiday Face-Off	December 28–29	4	Wisconsin
Adirondack Winter Invitational	December 29–30	4	Arizona State
Ledyard Bank Classic	December 29–30	4	Maine
Desert Hockey Classic	January 5–6	4	Arizona State
Connecticut Ice	January 26–27	4	Quinnipiac
Beanpot	February 5, 12	4	Northeastern

=== Standings ===
2023–24 Atlantic Hockey Standings
	Conference record										Overall record					
	GP	W	L	T	OW	OL	SW	PTS	GF	GA	GP	W	L	T	GF	GA
#17 RIT †*	26	18	7	1	3	2	0	54	102	64	40	27	11	2	156	96
Holy Cross	26	13	10	3	0	3	1	46	78	62	39	21	14	4	116	93
Sacred Heart	26	14	10	2	2	2	1	45	75	70	36	14	19	3	91	113
Air Force	26	15	10	1	3	0	1	44	88	75	38	18	19	1	115	119
American International	26	12	10	4	1	1	2	42	79	68	40	20	16	4	119	111
Bentley	26	12	12	2	1	2	2	41	69	58	35	16	17	2	95	82
Niagara	26	13	10	3	3	1	1	41	78	79	39	18	18	3	111	122
Canisius	26	10	12	4	2	1	0	33	73	87	37	12	21	4	103	126
Mercyhurst	26	7	15	4	0	1	4	30	77	91	35	9	22	4	98	126
Army	26	8	16	2	0	1	1	28	66	96	35	10	23	2	93	139
Robert Morris	26	7	17	2	0	1	1	25	60	95	39	11	25	3	94	142
Championship: March 23, 2024 † indicates conference regular season champion (DeGregorio Trophy) * indicates conference tournament champion (Riley Trophy); Rankings: USCHO.com Top 20 Poll

2023–24 Big Ten ice hockey Standings
	Conference record										Overall record					
	GP	W	L	T	OTW	OTL	3/SW	PTS	GF	GA	GP	W	L	T	GF	GA
#5 Michigan State †*	24	16	6	2	0	1	1	52	92	69	38	25	10	3	147	117
#11 Wisconsin	24	16	7	1	2	2	1	50	81	57	40	26	12	2	128	81
#7 Minnesota	24	13	7	4	3	1	0	41	80	65	39	23	11	5	135	100
#4 Michigan	24	11	11	2	1	1	1	36	85	77	41	23	15	3	169	125
Notre Dame	24	9	13	2	0	1	1	31	66	62	36	15	19	2	101	98
Penn State	24	7	14	3	0	1	2	27	62	92	36	15	18	3	113	130
Ohio State	24	4	18	2	1	0	2	15	50	94	38	14	20	4	100	124
Championship: March 23, 2024 † indicates conference regular season champion * indicates conference tournament champion Rankings: USCHO.com Top 20 Poll; updated April 11, 2024

2023–24 Central Collegiate Hockey Association Standings
	Conference record										Overall record					
	GP	W	L	T	OTW	OTL	SW	PTS	GF	GA	GP	W	L	T	GF	GA
Bemidji State †	24	15	7	2	2	1	2	48	82	64	38	20	16	2	117	111
St. Thomas	24	12	11	1	0	2	0	39	68	62	37	15	20	2	97	105
#19 Michigan Tech*	24	12	10	2	1	2	0	39	63	54	40	19	15	6	109	102
Minnesota State	24	12	10	2	2	1	1	38	73	62	37	18	15	4	111	96
Northern Michigan	24	10	10	4	1	1	2	36	57	67	34	12	16	6	83	105
Bowling Green	24	11	12	1	1	1	1	35	60	69	36	13	22	1	86	116
Lake Superior State	24	11	12	1	2	2	0	34	79	73	38	17	20	1	114	113
Ferris State	24	6	17	1	3	2	1	19	49	80	36	10	24	2	83	125
Augustana ^	0	0	0	0	0	0	0	0	0	0	34	12	18	4	90	105
Championship: March 22, 2024 † indicates conference regular season champion (MacNaughton Cup) * indicates conference tournament champion (Mason Cup)^ Augustana is playing a transition schedule of 16 games against conference opponents that are not counted in the standings Rankings: USCHO.com Top 20 Poll

2023–24 NCAA Division I Independent ice hockey standings
	Overall record					
	GP	W	L	T	GF	GA
Alaska	34	17	14	3	110	86
Alaska Anchorage	34	15	17	2	95	105
Arizona State	38	24	8	6	129	94
Lindenwood	28	6	18	4	74	121
Long Island	37	16	20	1	115	103
Stonehill	36	2	34	0	62	213
Rankings: USCHO.com Top 20 Poll

2023–24 ECAC Hockey Standings
	Conference record										Overall record					
	GP	W	L	T	OTW	OTL	SW	PTS	GF	GA	GP	W	L	T	GF	GA
#6 Quinnipiac †	22	17	4	1	0	2	0	54	99	39	39	27	10	2	160	79
#9 Cornell *	22	12	6	4	1	2	3	44	74	45	35	22	7	6	115	65
Colgate	22	13	7	2	2	2	2	43	85	68	36	16	16	4	120	112
Dartmouth	22	9	6	7	1	1	3	37	66	60	32	13	10	9	92	91
Clarkson	22	12	9	1	4	2	1	36	62	58	35	18	16	1	95	97
Union	22	9	10	3	1	1	2	32	75	75	37	16	18	3	123	121
St. Lawrence	22	8	10	4	1	1	1	29	49	64	39	14	19	6	90	118
Harvard	22	6	10	6	1	2	3	28	49	64	32	7	19	6	70	106
Princeton	22	8	11	3	4	0	2	25	70	90	30	10	16	4	89	114
Yale	22	7	13	2	1	2	1	25	46	57	30	10	18	2	63	91
Brown	22	6	14	2	2	3	1	22	43	69	30	8	19	3	61	98
Rensselaer	22	6	13	3	0	0	0	21	58	89	37	10	23	4	93	150
Championship: March 23, 2024 † indicates conference regular season champion (Cleary Cup) * indicates conference tournament champion (Whitelaw Cup); Rankings: USCHO.com Top 20 Poll

2023–24 Hockey East Standings
	Conference record										Overall record					
	GP	W	L	T	OTW	OTL	SW	PTS	GF	GA	GP	W	L	T	GF	GA
#2 Boston College †*	24	20	3	1	1	0	1	61	105	56	41	34	6	1	183	89
#3 Boston University	24	18	4	2	1	1	1	57	104	53	40	28	10	2	163	97
#10 Maine	24	14	9	1	0	1	0	44	76	67	37	23	12	2	119	94
#16 Providence	24	11	9	4	3	1	2	37	66	58	35	18	13	4	100	83
#13 Massachusetts	24	12	10	2	4	2	0	36	57	62	37	20	14	3	108	105
#20 New Hampshire	24	12	11	1	1	0	0	36	69	56	36	20	15	1	106	90
Northeastern	24	9	14	1	1	3	0	30	65	71	36	17	16	3	113	97
Connecticut	24	9	14	1	1	1	1	29	49	77	36	15	19	2	90	105
Vermont	24	7	14	3	1	0	3	26	52	81	35	13	19	3	87	106
Merrimack	24	6	17	1	0	1	1	21	62	85	35	13	21	1	98	114
Massachusetts Lowell	24	4	17	3	1	4	0	18	39	78	36	8	24	4	72	113
Championship: March 23, 2024 † indicates regular season champion * indicates conference tournament champion (Lamoriello Trophy); Rankings: USCHO Division I Men's Poll

2023–24 National Collegiate Hockey Conference Standings
	Conference record										Overall record					
	GP	W	L	T	OTW	OTL	SW	PTS	GF	GA	GP	W	L	T	GF	GA
#8 North Dakota †	24	15	8	1	1	4	0	49	87	67	40	26	12	2	151	105
#1 Denver *	24	15	7	2	3	0	1	45	110	80	44	32	9	3	202	120
#18 St. Cloud State	24	11	9	4	1	3	2	41	77	74	38	17	16	5	121	114
#15 Colorado College	24	14	8	2	5	2	0	41	66	56	37	21	13	3	111	93
#12 Omaha	24	13	8	3	5	0	3	40	68	74	40	23	13	4	117	112
#14 Western Michigan	24	11	13	0	1	5	0	35	78	64	38	21	16	1	136	97
Minnesota Duluth	24	8	14	2	3	3	2	28	65	80	37	12	20	5	103	125
Miami	24	1	21	2	0	2	0	7	44	100	36	7	26	3	78	135
Championship: March 23, 2024 † indicates conference regular season champion (Penrose Cup) * indicates conference tournament champion (Frozen Faceoff Championship Trophy); Rankings: USCHO.com Top 20 Poll; Updated: April 1, 2024

== PairWise Rankings ==
The PairWise Rankings (PWR) are a statistical tool designed to approximate the process by which the NCAA selection committee decides which teams get at-large bids to the 16-team NCAA tournament. Although the NCAA selection committee does not use the PWR as presented by USCHO, the PWR has been accurate in predicting which teams will make the tournament field.

For Division I men, all teams are included in comparisons starting in the 2013–14 season (formerly, only teams with a Ratings Percentage Index of .500 or above, or teams under consideration, were included). The PWR method compares each team with every other such team, with the winner of each “comparison” earning one PWR point. After all comparisons are made, the points are totaled up and rankings listed accordingly.

With 64 Division I men's teams, the greatest number of PWR points any team could earn is 63, winning the comparison with every other team. Meanwhile, a team that lost all of its comparisons would have no PWR points.

Teams are then ranked by PWR point total, with ties broken by the teams’ RPI ratings, which starting in 2013–14 is weighted for home and road games and includes a quality wins bonus (QWB) for beating teams in the top 20 of the RPI (it also is weighted for home and road).

When it comes to comparing teams, the PWR uses three criteria which are combined to make a comparison: RPI, record against common opponents and head-to-head competition. Starting in 2013–14, the comparison of record against teams under consideration was dropped because all teams are now under comparison.

NCAA Division I Men's Hockey PairWise Rankings
Rank	Team	PWR	RPI	Conference
1	Boston College	63	.6298*	Hockey East
2	Boston University	62	.6046	Hockey East
3	Denver	61	.5976*	NCHC
4	Michigan State	60	.5906*	Big Ten
5	Maine	58	.5739	Hockey East
6	North Dakota	57	.5874*	NCHC
6	Minnesota	57	.5713	Big Ten
8	Wisconsin	56	.5709*	Big Ten
9	Quinnipiac	55	.5701*	ECAC Hockey
10	Michigan	54	.5602*	Big Ten
10	Omaha	54	.5600	NCHC
12	Cornell	52	.5521	ECAC Hockey
13	Western Michigan	50	.5520	NCHC
13	Massachusetts	50	.5497	Hockey East
15	Colorado College	48	.5493	NCHC
15	Providence	48	.5453*	Hockey East
15	St. Cloud State	48	.5429	NCHC
18	New Hampshire	46	.5414	Hockey East
19	Northeastern	45	.5330*	Hockey East
19	Arizona State	45	.5308*	Independent
21	RIT	43	.5298	Atlantic Hockey
22	Notre Dame	42	.5147	Big Ten
23	Penn State	41	.5141	Big Ten
24	Connecticut	40	.5114	Hockey East
25	Alaska	39	.5094*	Independent
26	Ohio State	38	.5076	Big Ten
27	American International	37	.5075	Atlantic Hockey
28	Holy Cross	36	.5068	Atlantic Hockey
29	Dartmouth	35	.5061	ECAC Hockey
30	Minnesota Duluth	34	.5057	NCHC
31	Bemidji State	33	.4976	CCHA
32	Michigan Tech	32	.4961	CCHA
33	Vermont	31	.4959	Hockey East
34	Minnesota State	30	.4951	CCHA
35	Merrimack	29	.4950*	Hockey East
36	Colgate	27	.4924	ECAC Hockey
36	Clarkson	27	.4883*	ECAC Hockey
39	Union	25	.4826*	ECAC Hockey
39	Alaska Anchorage	25	.4798*	Independent
39	Augustana	25	.4794	CCHA
41	Massachusetts Lowell	23	.4793	Hockey East
42	Niagara	22	.4785	Atlantic Hockey
43	St. Lawrence	21	.4778	ECAC Hockey
44	Bentley	20	.4743*	Atlantic Hockey
45	Air Force	19	.4737	Atlantic Hockey
46	Lake Superior State	18	.4675	CCHA
47	St. Thomas	17	.4695	CCHA
48	Northern Michigan	16	.4610	CCHA
49	Miami	15	.4593	NCHC
50	Harvard	14	.4586	ECAC Hockey
51	Yale	13	.4585	ECAC Hockey
52	Long Island	12	.4542	Independent
53	Sacred Heart	10	.4583	Atlantic Hockey
53	Rensselaer	10	.4513	ECAC Hockey
53	Princeton	10	.4496	ECAC Hockey
56	Bowling Green	8	.4440	CCHA
56	Army	8	.4434	Atlantic Hockey
58	Canisius	6	.4431	Atlantic Hockey
59	Mercyhurst	5	.4336	Atlantic Hockey
60	Robert Morris	4	.4334	Atlantic Hockey
61	Brown	3	.4312	ECAC Hockey
62	Lindenwood	2	.4215	Independent
63	Ferris State	1	.4171	CCHA
64	Stonehill	0	.3396	Independent
*A team's RPI has been adjusted to remove negative effect from defeating a weak opponent Note: A team's record is based only on games against other Division I hockey schools which are eligible for the NCAA Tournament; Final

== Player stats ==
=== Scoring leaders ===
Player	Class	Team	GP	G	A	Pts	PIM
Will Smith	Freshman	Boston College	41	25	46	71	14
Cutter Gauthier	Sophomore	Boston College	41	38	27	65	18
Macklin Celebrini	Freshman	Boston University	38	32	32	64	18
Ryan Leonard	Freshman	Boston College	41	31	29	60	38
Jackson Blake	Sophomore	North Dakota	40	22	38	60	26
Gabe Perreault	Freshman	Boston College	36	19	41	60	29
Jack Devine	Junior	Denver	44	27	29	56	20
Gavin Brindley	Sophomore	Michigan	40	25	28	53	28
Rutger McGroarty	Sophomore	Michigan	36	16	36	52	6
Zeev Buium	Freshman	Denver	42	11	39	50	20

=== Leading goaltenders ===
The following goaltenders lead the NCAA in goals against average, minimum 1/3 of team's minutes played.
GP = Games played; Min = Minutes played; W = Wins; L = Losses; T = Ties; GA = Goals against; SO = Shutouts; SV% = Save percentage; GAA = Goals against average

Player	Class	Team	GP	Min	W	L	T	GA	SO	SV%	GAA
Ian Shane	Junior	Cornell	34	2021:09	22	5	6	57	3	.923	1.69
Kyle McClellan	Senior	Wisconsin	37	2198:21	24	12	1	71	7	.931	1.94
Jason Grande	Senior	Holy Cross	22	1280:38	13	6	2	43	1	.928	2.01
Albin Boija	Freshman	Maine	18	1014:32	10	6	1	34	2	.916	2.01
Vinny Duplessis	Senior	Quinnipiac	30	1814:11	21	7	2	61	3	.914	2.02
Gibson Homer	Sophomore	Arizona State	14	795:38	8	3	2	27	1	.931	2.04
Jakob Hellsten	Junior	New Hampshire	28	1675:12	15	12	1	57	5	.909	2.04
Jacob Fowler	Freshman	Boston College	39	2326:35	32	6	1	83	3	.926	2.14
Jake Sibell	Sophomore	St. Thomas	15	852:10	7	8	0	31	0	.923	2.18
Jack Stark	Freshman	Yale	21	1213:52	8	10	2	45	2	.925	2.22

== Tournament bracket ==
Regional Semifinals; March 28–29
1	Boston College (1)	6
4	Michigan Tech	1
East – Providence – Fri/Sun
2	Wisconsin	2
3	Quinnipiac	3*
1	Michigan State (4)	5*
4	Western Michigan	4
Midwest – Maryland Heights – Fri/Sun
2	North Dakota	3
3	Michigan	4
1	Boston University (2)	6
4	RIT	3
West – Sioux Falls – Thu/Sat
2	Minnesota	3
3	Omaha	2
1	Denver (3)	2**
4	Massachusetts	1
Northeast – Springfield – Thu/Sat
2	Maine	1
3	Cornell	3

Regional Finals; March 30–31
1	Boston College	5*
3	Quinnipiac	4
1	Michigan State	2
3	Michigan	5
1	Boston University	6
2	Minnesota	3
1	Denver	2
3	Cornell	1

National Semifinals; Thursday, April 11
E1	Boston College	4
MW3	Michigan	0
W1	Boston University	1
NE1	Denver	2*

National Championship; Saturday, April 13
E1	Boston College	0
NE1	Denver	2

Number in parentheses denotes overall seed in the tournament.
* denotes overtime period

== Awards ==
=== NCAA ===
Award		Recipient
Hobey Baker Award		Macklin Celebrini, Boston University
Spencer Penrose Award		Greg Brown, Boston College
Tim Taylor Award		Macklin Celebrini, Boston University
Mike Richter Award		Kyle McClellan, Wisconsin
Derek Hines Unsung Hero Award		Luke Robinson, Air Force
Tournament Most Outstanding Player		Matt Davis, Denver
AHCA All-American Teams
East First Team	Position	West First Team
Jacob Fowler, Boston College	G	Kaidan Mbereko, Colorado College
Lane Hutson, Boston University	D	Zeev Buium, Denver
Ryan Ufko, Massachusetts	D	Seamus Casey, Michigan
Macklin Celebrini, Boston University	F	Jackson Blake, North Dakota
Cutter Gauthier, Boston College	F	Gavin Brindley, Michigan
Will Smith, Boston College	F	Jack Devine, Denver
East Second Team	Position	West Second Team
Ian Shane, Cornell	G	Kyle McClellan, Wisconsin
Gianfranco Cassaro, RIT	D	Dylan Anhorn, St. Cloud State
John Prokop, Union	D	Artyom Levshunov, Michigan State
Collin Graf, Quinnipiac	F	Noah Laba, Colorado College
Ryan Leonard, Boston College	F	Rutger McGroarty, Michigan
Liam McLinskey, Holy Cross	F	Massimo Rizzo, Denver
Gabe Perreault, Boston College	F	

=== Atlantic Hockey ===
Award		Recipient
Player of the Year		Liam McLinskey, Holy Cross
Goaltender of the Year		Tommy Scarfone, RIT
Rookie of the Year		Matteo Giampa, Canisius
Best Defensive Forward		Austin Schwartz, Air Force
Best Defenseman		Brian Kramer, American International
Individual Sportsmanship Award		Braeden Tuck, Sacred Heart
Team Sportsmanship Award		Sacred Heart
Regular Season Scoring Trophy		Liam McLinskey, Holy Cross
Regular Season Goaltending Award		Jason Grande, Holy Cross
Coach of the Year		Wayne Wilson, RIT
Tournament MVP		Elijah Gonsalves, RIT
All-Atlantic Hockey Teams
First Team	Position	Second Team
Tommy Scarfone, RIT	G	Jason Grande, Holy Cross
Gianfranco Cassaro, RIT	D	Chris Hedden, Air Force
Brian Kramer, American International	D	Aiden Hansen-Bukata, RIT
Liam McLinskey, Holy Cross	F	Matteo Giampa, Canisius
Carter Wilkie, RIT	F	Jack Ricketts, Holy Cross
Will Gavin, Air Force	F	Joey Baez, Army
Cody Laskosky, RIT	F	
Third Team	Position	Rookie Team
Owen Say, Mercyhurst	G	Nils Wallström, American International
Luke Rowe, Air Force	D	Mac Gadowsky, Army
Nick Bochen, Bentley	D	Trent Sambrook, Mercyhurst
Ethan Leyh, Bentley	F	Matteo Giampa, Canisius
John Jaworski, Sacred Heart	F	Boris Skalos, Mercyhurst
Elijah Gonsalves, RIT	F	Jack Stockfish, Holy Cross

=== Big Ten ===
Award		Recipient
Player of the Year		Gavin Brindley, Michigan
Defensive Player of the Year		Artyom Levshunov, Michigan State
Goaltender of the Year		Kyle McClellan, Wisconsin
Freshman of the Year		Artyom Levshunov, Michigan State
Scoring Champion		Gavin Brindley, Michigan
Coach of the Year		Adam Nightingale, Michigan State
Tournament Most Outstanding Player		Trey Augustine, Michigan State
All-Big Ten Teams
First Team	Position	Second Team
Kyle McClellan, Wisconsin	G	Trey Augustine, Michigan State
Seamus Casey, Michigan	D	Scooter Brickey, Ohio State
Artyom Levshunov, Michigan State	D	Ryan Chesley, Minnesota
	D	Sam Rinzel, Minnesota
Gavin Brindley, Michigan	F	Dylan Duke, Michigan
Rutger McGroarty, Michigan	F	Rhett Pitlick, Minnesota
Jimmy Snuggerud, Minnesota	F	Landon Slaggert, Notre Dame
Freshman Team	Position	
Trey Augustine, Michigan State	G	
Artyom Levshunov, Michigan State	D	
Sam Rinzel, Minnesota	D	
Aiden Fink, Penn State	F	
Oliver Moore, Minnesota	F	
Garrett Schifsky, Michigan	F	

=== CCHA ===
Award		Recipient
Player of the Year		Sam Morton, Minnesota State
Forward of the Year		Sam Morton, Minnesota State
Defenseman of the Year		Kyle Looft, Bemidji State
Goaltender of the Year		Mattias Sholl, Bemidji State
Rookie of the Year		Isaac Gordon, Michigan Tech
Best Defensive Defenseman		Kyle Looft, Bemidji State
Best Defensive Forward		Connor Milburn, Lake Superior State
Best Defensive Forward		Jackson Jutting, Bemidji State
Coach of the Year		Tom Serratore, Bemidji State
All-CCHA Teams
First Team	Position	Second Team
Mattias Sholl, Bemidji State	G	Blake Pietila, Michigan Tech
Kyle Looft, Bemidji State	D	Evan Murr, Minnesota State
Eric Pohlkamp, Bemidji State	D	Josh Zinger, Northern Michigan
Sam Morton, Minnesota State	F	Isaac Gordon, Michigan Tech
Lleyton Roed, Bemidji State	F	Connor Milburn, Lake Superior State
Jared Westcott, Lake Superior State	F	Lucas Wahlin, St. Thomas
Rookie Team	Position	
Cole Moore, Bowling Green	G	
Evan Murr, Minnesota State	D	
Eric Pohlkamp, Bemidji State	D	
Luigi Benincasa, Ferris State	F	
Isaac Gordon, Michigan Tech	F	
John Herrington, Lake Superior State	F	

=== ECAC Hockey ===
Award		Recipient
Player of the Year		Collin Graf, Quinnipiac
Best Defensive Forward		Jacob Quillan, Quinnipiac
Best Defensive Defenseman		Trey Taylor, Clarkson
Rookie of the Year		C. J. Foley, Dartmouth
Ken Dryden Award		Ian Shane, Cornell
Student-Athlete of the Year		Gabriel Seger, Cornell
Wayne Dean Sportsmanship Award		Ben Tupker, Union
Tim Taylor Award		Reid Cashman, Dartmouth
Most Outstanding Player in Tournament		Jonathan Castagna, Cornell
All-ECAC Hockey Teams
First Team	Position	Second Team
Ian Shane, Cornell	G	Cooper Black, Dartmouth
John Prokop, Union	D	Trey Taylor, Clarkson
Jayden Lee, Quinnipiac	D	Tommy Bergsland, Colgate
Collin Graf, Quinnipiac	F	Jacob Quillan, Quinnipiac
Luke Haymes, Dartmouth	F	Sam Lipkin, Quinnipiac
Gabriel Seger, Cornell	F	Liam Robertson, Union
Third Team	Position	Rookie Team
Vinny Duplessis, Quinnipiac	G	Jack Stark, Yale
Ben Robertson, Cornell	D	C. J. Foley, Dartmouth
C. J. Foley, Dartmouth	D	Ben Robertson, Cornell
Dalton Bancroft, Clarkson	F	Mason Marcellus, Quinnipiac
Joe Miller, Harvard	F	Jonathan Castagna, Cornell
Mathieu Gosselin, Clarkson	F	Jake Schneider, Colgate

=== Hockey East ===
Award		Recipient
Player of the Year		Macklin Celebrini, Boston University
Best Defensive Forward		Justin Hryckowian, Northeastern
Best Defensive Defenseman		Cade Webber, Boston University
Rookie of the Year		Macklin Celebrini, Boston University
Goaltending Champion		Jacob Fowler, Boston College
Len Ceglarski Award		Ryan Ufko, Massachusetts
Len Ceglarski Award		Eamon Powell, Boston College
Three Stars Award		Macklin Celebrini, Boston University
Scoring Champion		Macklin Celebrini, Boston University
Charlie Holt Team Sportsmanship Award		Northeastern
Bob Kullen Award (Coach of the Year)		Greg Brown, Boston College
William Flynn Tournament Most Valuable Player		Will Smith, Boston College
All-Hockey East Teams
First Team	Position	Second Team
Jacob Fowler, Boston College	G	Michael Hrabal, Massachusetts
Lane Hutson, Boston University	D	Eamon Powell, Boston College
Ryan Ufko, Massachusetts	D	Tom Willander, Boston University
Macklin Celebrini, Boston University	F	Ryan Leonard, Boston College
Cutter Gauthier, Boston College	F	Bradly Nadeau, Maine
Will Smith, Boston College	F	Gabe Perreault, Boston College
Third Team	Position	Rookie Team
Mathieu Caron, Boston University	G	Jacob Fowler, Boston College
Alex Gagne, New Hampshire	D	
Scott Morrow, Massachusetts	D	
Alex Campbell, Northeastern	F	Macklin Celebrini, Boston University
Justin Hryckowian, Northeastern	F	Ryan Leonard, Boston College
Josh Nadeau, Maine	F	Bradly Nadeau, Maine
	F	Gabe Perreault, Boston College
	F	Will Smith, Boston College

=== NCHC ===
Award		Recipient
Player of the Year		Jackson Blake, North Dakota
Rookie of the Year		Zeev Buium, Denver
Goaltender of the Year		Kaidan Mbereko, Colorado College
Forward of the Year		Jackson Blake, North Dakota
Defensive Defenseman of the Year		Sean Behrens, Denver
Offensive Defenseman of the Year		Zeev Buium, Denver
Defensive Forward of the Year		Noah Laba, Colorado College
Scholar-Athlete of the Year		Luke Grainger, Western Michigan
Three Stars Award		Noah Laba, Colorado College
Sportsmanship Award		Darian Gotz, Minnesota Duluth
Herb Brooks Coach of the Year		Kris Mayotte, Colorado College
Frozen Faceoff MVP		McKade Webster, Denver
All-NCHC Teams
First Team	Position	Second Team
Kaidan Mbereko, Colorado College	G	Ludvig Persson, North Dakota
Zeev Buium, Denver	D	Shai Buium, Denver
Dylan Anhorn, St. Cloud State	D	Jack Peart, St. Cloud State
Jackson Blake, North Dakota	F	Luke Grainger, Western Michigan
Jack Devine, Denver	F	Massimo Rizzo, Denver
Noah Laba, Colorado College	F	Ben Steeves, Minnesota Duluth
Honorable Mention	Position	Rookie Team
Simon Latkoczy, Omaha	G	Isak Posch, St. Cloud State
Sean Behrens, Denver	D	Zeev Buium, Denver
Jake Livanavage, North Dakota	D	Jake Livanavage, North Dakota
Garrett Pyke, North Dakota	D	
Cameron Berg, North Dakota	F	Miko Matikka, Denver
Sam Colangelo, Western Michigan	F	Alex Bump, Western Michigan
Riese Gaber, North Dakota	F	Tanner Ludtke, Omaha

=== HCA ===
Month	Award	Recipient
October	Player of the Month	Massimo Rizzo, Denver
October	Player of the Month	Rutger McGroarty, Michigan
October	Rookie of the Month	Macklin Celebrini, Boston University
October	Goaltender of the Month	Tommy Scarfone, RIT
November	Player of the Month	Zeev Buium, Denver
November	Player of the Month	Jared Westcott, Lake Superior State
November	Rookie of the Month	Aiden Fink, Penn State
November	Goaltender of the Month	Nils Wallström, American International
December	Player of the Month	Josh Nadeau, Maine
December	Rookie of the Month	Alfred Lindberg, American International
December	Goaltender of the Month	Kyle McClellan, Wisconsin
January	Player of the Month	Rutger McGroarty, Michigan
January	Rookie of the Month	Will Smith, Boston College
January	Goaltender of the Month	Tommy Scarfone, RIT
February	Player of the Month	Cutter Gauthier, Boston College
February	Rookie of the Month	Ryan Leonard, Boston College
February	Goaltender of the Month	Kaidan Mbereko, Colorado College
March	Player of the Month	Cutter Gauthier, Boston College
March	Rookie of the Month	Macklin Celebrini, Boston University
March	Goaltender of the Month	Matt Davis, Denver

== 2024 NHL entry draft ==
Round	Pick	Player	College	Conference	NHL team
1	1	Macklin Celebrini	Boston University	Hockey East	San Jose Sharks
1	2	Artyom Levshunov	Michigan State	Big Ten	Chicago Blackhawks
1	12	Zeev Buium	Denver	NCHC	Minnesota Wild
1	18	Sacha Boisvert ^{†}	North Dakota	NCHC	Chicago Blackhawks
1	19	Trevor Connelly ^{†}	Providence	Hockey East	Vegas Golden Knights
1	20	Cole Eiserman ^{†}	Boston University	Hockey East	New York Islanders
1	21	Michael Hage ^{†}	Michigan	Big Ten	Montreal Canadiens
1	25	Dean Letourneau ^{†}	Boston College	Hockey East	Boston Bruins
1	30	E. J. Emery ^{†}	North Dakota	NCHC	New York Rangers
2	42	Adam Kleber ^{†}	Minnesota Duluth	NCHC	Buffalo Sabres
2	43	Cole Hutson ^{†}	Boston University	Hockey East	Washington Capitals
2	47	Max Plante ^{†}	Minnesota Duluth	NCHC	Detroit Red Wings
2	48	Colin Ralph ^{†}	St. Cloud State	NCHC	St. Louis Blues
2	49	Mikhail Yegorov ^{†}	Boston University	Hockey East	New Jersey Devils
2	55	Teddy Stiga ^{†}	Boston College	Hockey East	Nashville Predators
2	61	Kamil Bednarik ^{†}	Boston University	Hockey East	New York Islanders
2	65	Will Skahan ^{†}	Boston College	Hockey East	Utah Hockey Club
3	67	John Mustard ^{†}	Providence	Hockey East	Chicago Blackhawks
3	71	Brodie Ziemer ^{†}	Minnesota	Big Ten	Buffalo Sabres
3	76	Will Zellers ^{†}	North Dakota	NCHC	Colorado Avalanche
3	78	Logan Sawyer ^{†}	Providence	Hockey East	Montreal Canadiens
4	101	Tanner Henricks ^{†}	St. Cloud State	NCHC	Columbus Blue Jackets
4	106	Trevor Hoskin ^{†}	Niagara	Atlantic Hockey	Calgary Flames
4	107	Heikki Ruohonen ^{†}	Harvard	ECAC Hockey	Philadelphia Flyers
4	108	Luke Osburn ^{†}	Wisconsin	Big Ten	Buffalo Sabres
4	110	Elliott Groenewold ^{†}	Quinnipiac	ECAC Hockey	Boston Bruins
4	111	Chase Pietila	Michigan Tech	CCHA	Pittsburgh Penguins
4	112	Javon Moore ^{†}	Minnesota	Big Ten	Ottawa Senators
4	114	Nicholas Kempf ^{†}	Notre Dame	Big Ten	Washington Capitals
4	116	Christian Kirsch ^{†}	Massachusetts	Hockey East	San Jose Sharks
4	117	Blake Montgomery ^{†}	Wisconsin	Big Ten	Ottawa Senators
4	121	Jake Fisher ^{†}	Denver	NCHC	Colorado Avalanche
4	128	Hagen Burrows ^{†}	Denver	NCHC	Tampa Bay Lightning
5	132	Louka Cloutier ^{†}	Omaha	NCHC	Colorado Avalanche
5	144	John Whipple ^{†}	Minnesota	Big Ten	Detroit Red Wings
5	148	Noah Powell ^{†}	Ohio State	Big Ten	Philadelphia Flyers
5	154	Jonathan Morello ^{†}	Clarkson	ECAC Hockey	Boston Bruins
6	165	Luke Ashton ^{†}	Minnesota State	CCHA	Columbus Blue Jackets
6	166	Ben Merrill ^{†}	Harvard	ECAC Hockey	Montreal Canadiens
6	172	Patrick Geary	Michigan State	Big Ten	Buffalo Sabres
6	175	Joona Vaisanen ^{†}	Western Michigan	NCHC	Pittsburgh Penguins
6	179	Xavier Veilleux ^{†}	Cornell	ECAC Hockey	New York Islanders
6	182	Austin Burnevik ^{†}	St. Cloud State	NCHC	Anaheim Ducks
6	185	Tory Pitner ^{†}	Denver	NCHC	Colorado Avalanche
7	195	Joseph Connor ^{†}	Northeastern	Hockey East	Tampa Bay Lightning
7	197	Lucas Van Vliet ^{†}	St. Thomas	CCHA	Vegas Golden Knights
7	198	James Reeder ^{†}	Denver	NCHC	Los Angeles Kings
7	200	Matt Lahey ^{†}	Clarkson	ECAC Hockey	Toronto Maple Leafs
7	203	Austin Baker ^{†}	Michigan State	Big Ten	Detroit Red Wings
7	205	Austin Moline ^{†}	Northern Michigan	CCHA	Philadelphia Flyers
7	207	Mac Swanson ^{†}	North Dakota	NCHC	Pittsburgh Penguins
7	208	Fisher Scott ^{†}	Colorado College	NCHC	Detroit Red Wings
7	213	Erik Pahlsson ^{†}	Minnesota	Big Ten	Nashville Predators
7	215	Christian Humphreys ^{†}	Michigan	Big Ten	Colorado Avalanche
7	218	Bauer Berry ^{†}	St. Thomas	CCHA	Edmonton Oilers

† incoming freshman
Note: players who later became eligible for NCAA participation due to 2024 rule changes are not included.

== See also ==
- 2023–24 NCAA Division I women's ice hockey season
- 2023–24 NCAA Division II men's ice hockey season
- 2023–24 NCAA Division III men's ice hockey season
