= Collin Graf =

American ice hockey player (born 2002)

- Graf with the San Jose Sharks in 2026
- Born: September 21, 2002 (age 24) Lincoln, Massachusetts, U.S.
- Height: 6 ft 1 in (185 cm)
- Weight: 190 lb (86 kg; 13 st 8 lb)
- Position: Right wing
- Shoots: Right
- NHL team: San Jose Sharks
- NHL draft: Undrafted
- Playing career: 2024–present

Collin Graf (born September 21, 2002) is an American professional ice hockey player who is a right winger for the San Jose Sharks of the National Hockey League (NHL). He played college ice hockey for Union College and Quinnipiac University.

== Early life ==
Graf was born in Lincoln, Massachusetts to engineers Robert and Theresa Graf. He has a younger brother, Justin, who was drafted 118th overall in the 2026 NHL draft by the Nashville Predators and plays for Harvard University. He learned how to skate at the request of his mother, and credits watching hockey players during his lessons to cause him to want to play. As a child he played with the Assabet Valley Patriots, currently known as the Patriot Hockey Club.

== Playing career ==
=== College ===
Graf began his collegiate career for Union College during the 2021–22 season, where he recorded 11 goals and 11 assists in 37 games.

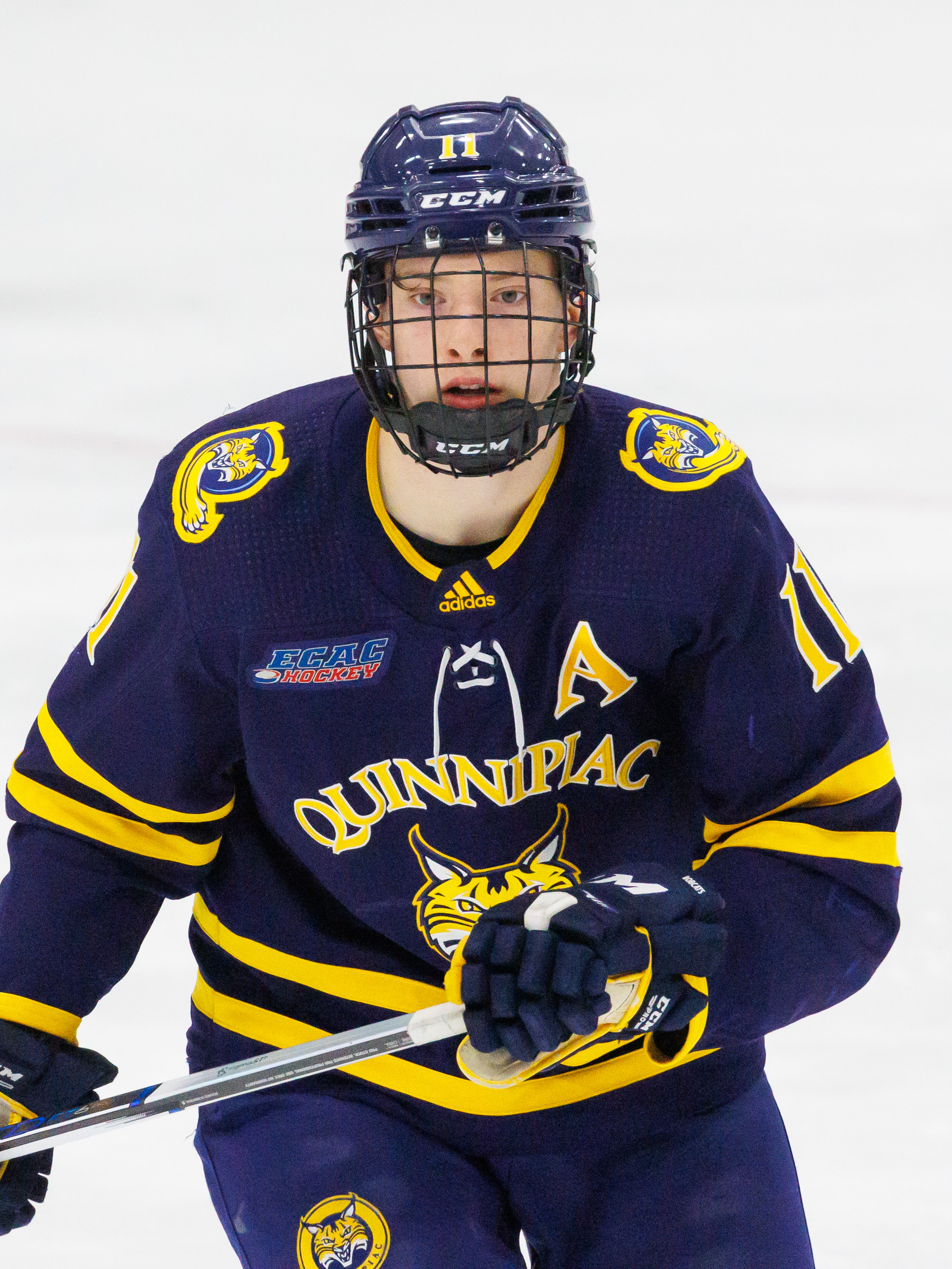
Graf at Quinnipiac

Following his freshman year he transferred to Quinnipiac University. During the 2022–23 season, in his sophomore year, he recorded a team-high 20 goals and 38 assists in 40 games. His 58 points were the most by a Bobcats player since Bryan Leitch set the program-record of 59 points during the 2008–09 season. On November 12, 2022, Graf recorded his first career hat-trick in a game against Yale. During November he recorded four goals and eight assists, including points in nine of the team's 10 games. During the Friendship Four he recorded three assists and was named the Player of the Tournament. He was subsequently named the ECAC Forward of the Month and the HCA Co-National Player of the Month. During December he recorded three goals and nine assists, and was one of only two players in the league to record double-digit points. He was subsequently named the ECAC Forward of the Month for the second consecutive month. Following the season he was named a unanimous All-ECAC First Team selection and named an AHCA East First Team All-American. He was also named a top-ten finalist for the Hobey Baker Award.

During the 2023–24 season, in his junior year, he led his team in goals and points, with 14 goals and 19 assists in 20 conference games, for a 1.65 points per game average. Following the season, he was again named a unanimous All-ECAC First Team selection and ECAC Hockey Player of the Year. He finished his collegiate career with 54 goals and 76 assists in 112 games.

=== Professional ===
On April 4, 2024, Graf signed a three-year, entry-level contract with the San Jose Sharks of the National Hockey League. He made his debut two days later, in a 3–2 overtime win over the St. Louis Blues. Graf got his first point in his second game, on April 7, assisting on a goal by Luke Kunin in a 5–2 loss to the Arizona Coyotes.

He split the 2024–25 season between the Sharks and their AHL affiliate, the San Jose Barracuda, before earning a permanent roster spot on the Sharks for the 2025–26 season. In addition to scoring 21 goals in his first full NHL season, Graf gained a reputation as a strong penalty-killing forward.

On July 31, 2026, Graf re-signed a three-year contract with the Sharks.

== Career statistics ==
			Regular season					Playoffs
Season	Team	League	GP	G	A	Pts	PIM	GP	G	A	Pts	PIM
2019–20	Boston Junior Bruins	NCDC	49	16	31	47	33	—	—	—	—	—
2020–21	Boston Junior Bruins	NCDC	24	19	35	54	24	6	3	5	8	2
2021–22	Union College	ECAC	37	11	11	22	10	—	—	—	—	—
2022–23	Quinnipiac University	ECAC	41	21	38	59	4	—	—	—	—	—
2023–24	Quinnipiac University	ECAC	34	22	27	49	4	—	—	—	—	—
2023–24	San Jose Sharks	NHL	7	0	2	2	0	—	—	—	—	—
2024–25	San Jose Barracuda	AHL	40	8	27	35	12	6	2	3	5	2
2024–25	San Jose Sharks	NHL	33	5	6	11	8	—	—	—	—	—
2025–26	San Jose Sharks	NHL	81	21	25	46	12	—	—	—	—	—
NHL totals			121	26	33	59	20	—	—	—	—	—

== Awards and honors ==
Award	Year	Ref
College
All-ECAC First Team	2023, 2024	
AHCA East First Team All-American	2023	
NCAA All-Tournament Team	2023	
ECAC Hockey Player of the Year	2024	
AHCA East Second Team All-American	2024	

Awards and achievements
Preceded by Sean Farrell	ECAC Hockey Player of the Year; 2023–24	Succeeded by Ayrton Martino
