= Princeton Tigers men's ice hockey statistical leaders =

The Princeton Tigers men's ice hockey statistical leaders are individual statistical leaders of the Princeton Tigers men's ice hockey program in various categories, including goals, assists, points, and saves. Within those areas, the lists identify single-game, single-season, and career leaders. The Tigers represent Princeton University in the NCAA's ECAC Hockey.

Princeton began competing in intercollegiate ice hockey in 1899. These lists are updated through the end of the 2020–21 season.

== Goals ==
Note: all records prior to 1948 are unofficial, however, Hobey Baker remains the program leader with at least 80 goals in his career, 35 goals during the 1912–13 season and 8 goals against Williams on December 20, 1912.

Career
Rk	Player	Goals	Seasons
1	Ryan Kuffner	75	2015–16 2016–17 2017–18 2018–19
2	John F. Cook	67	1960–61 1961–62 1962–63
3	Gregory P. Polaski	64	1986–87 1987–88 1988–89 1989–90
4	Andre Faust	63	1988–89 1989–90 1990–91 1991–92
5	R. Craig Tresham	61	1975–76 1976–77 1977–78 1978–79
6	John P. McBride	60	1957–58 1958–59 1959–60
	John Messuri	60	1985–86 1986–87 1987–88 1988–89
	Jeff Halpern	60	1995–96 1996–97 1997–98 1998–99
9	Hank Bothfeld	55	1950–51 1951–52 1952–53
10	John C.L. Ritchie	53	1965–66 1966–67 1967–68
	Trevor G. Kilburn	53	1975–76 1976–77 1977–78 1978–79

Season
Rk	Player	Goals	Season
1	Ryan Kuffner	29	2017–18
2	Jeff Halpern	28	1997–98
3	John P. McBride	27	1958–59
4	John F. Cook	26	1962–63
5	Jonathan E. Kelley	24	1994–95
6	Hank Bothfeld	23	1950–51
	John P. McBride	23	1959–60
8	Ryan Kuffner	22	2018–19

Single Game
Rk	Player	Goals	Season	Opponent
1	Peter G. Cook	5	1935–36	Colgate
	Hank Bothfeld	5	1950–51	Hamilton
	John F. Cook	5	1962–63	Northeastern
	Kai Daniells	5	2025–26	St. Lawrence
5	Bill Barber	4	1930–31	Amherst
	Malcolm McAlpin	4	1931–32	BU
	Eric Savage	4	1935–36	St. Nick's
	Dan Stuckey	4	1941–42	Harvard
	Gregory P. Polaski	4	1987–88	Yale
	Andre Faust	4	1990–91	Dartmouth
	Andrew Ammon	4	2012–13	Sacred Heart

== Assists ==
Career
Rk	Player	Assists	Seasons
1	John Messuri	118	1985–86 1986–87 1987–88 1988–89
2	Max Véronneau	92	2015–16 2016–17 2017–18 2018–19
3	Andre Faust	87	1988–89 1989–90 1990–91 1991–92
4	Jackson Cressey	84	2016–17 2017–18 2018–19 2019–20
5	Jeff Halpern	81	1995–96 1996–97 1997–98 1998–99
6	Andrew Calof	79	2010–11 2011–12 2012–13 2013–14
7	Scott Bertoli	77	1995–96 1996–97 1997–98 1998–99
	Ryan Kuffner	77	2015–16 2016–17 2017–18 2018–19
9	Grant F. Goeckner-Zoeller	73	2003–04 2004–05 2005–06 2006–07
10	Josh Teves	69	2015–16 2016–17 2017–18 2018–19

Season
Rk	Player	Assists	Season
1	John Messuri	38	1988–89
	Max Véronneau	38	2017–18
3	John Messuri	32	1987–88
4	John P. McBride	31	1959–60
5	Andre Faust	29	1989–90
	Scott Bertoli	29	1997–98
7	John Messuri	27	1985–86
	Lee Jubinville	27	2007–08
9	Cliff Abrecht	26	1985–86
	Luc Paquin	26	2004–05
	Jackson Cressey	26	2016–17
	Josh Teves	26	2017–18
	David Jacobs	26	2025–26

Single Game
Rk	Player	Assists	Season	Opponent
1	John Messuri	5	1988–89	Holy Cross

== Points ==
Career
Rk	Player	Points	Seasons
1	John Messuri	178	1985–86 1986–87 1987–88 1988–89
2	Ryan Kuffner	152	2015–16 2016–17 2017–18 2018–19
3	Andre Faust	150	1988–89 1989–90 1990–91 1991–92
4	Max Véronneau	143	2015–16 2016–17 2017–18 2018–19
5	Jeff Halpern	142	1995–96 1996–97 1997–98 1998–99
6	John F. Cook	132	1960–61 1961–62 1962–63
7	Andrew Calof	123	2010–11 2011–12 2012–13 2013–14
8	Gregory P. Polaski	121	1986–87 1987–88 1988–89 1989–90
9	Scott Bertoli	118	1995–96 1996–97 1997–98 1998–99
10	John P. McBride	117	1957–58 1958–59 1959–60

Season
Rk	Player	Points	Season
1	Max Véronneau	55	2017–18
2	John P. McBride	54	1959–60
3	Jeff Halpern	53	1997–98
4	Ryan Kuffner	52	2017–18
5	John Messuri	50	1988–89
6	John F. Cook	49	1962–63
	John Messuri	49	1987–88
8	John P. McBride	44	1958–59
	Andre Faust	44	1989–90
	Jeff Halpern	44	1998–99
	Ryan Kuffner	44	2018–19

Single Game
Rk	Player	Points	Season	Opponent
1	John Messuri	8	1988–89	Holy Cross
2	Hank Bothfeld	7	1950–51	Hamilton
	John F. Cook	7	1962–63	Pennsylvania
4	Dan Stuckey	6	1941–42	Army
	Ralph E. Wyer, Jr.	6	1938–39	St. Nicholas Hockey Club
	Ralph E. Wyer, Jr.	6	1938–39	Boston College
	Gerald D. Skoning	6	1962–63	Pennsylvania

== Saves ==
Career
Rk	Player	Saves	Seasons
1	Colton Phinney	3,440	2013–14 2014–15 2015–16 2016–17
2	Ronald M. Dennis	2951	1979–80 1980–81 1981–82 1982–83
3	Zane Kalemba	2680	2006–07 2007–08 2008–09 2009–10
4	Eric J. Leroux	2368	2002–03 2003–04 2004–05 2005–06
5	James L. Konte	2295	1992–93 1993–94 1994–95 1995–96
6	Edward M. Tilghman	2043	1967–68 1968–69 1969–70
7	Ryan Ferland	1,909	2017–18 2018–19 2019–20
8	Dave Stathos	1728	1998–99 1999–00 2000–01 2001–02
9	Erasmo Saltarelli	1675	1994–95 1995–96 1996–97 1997–98
10	Edward M. Swift	1670	1970–71 1971–72 1972–73

Season
Rk	Player	Saves	Season
1	Colton Phinney	1058	2015–16
2	Colton Phinney	990	2016–17
	Ryan Ferland	990	2017–18
4	Erasmo Saltarelli	870	1997–98
5	Edward M. Tilghman	847	1969–70
6	Zane Kalemba	845	2008–09
7	Ronald M. Dennis	827	1982–83
8	Dave Stathos	786	2001–02
9	William J. Hill	773	1962–63
	Eric J. Leroux	773	2003–04

Single Game
Rk	Player	Saves	Season	Opponent
1	Walter K. McDonough	61	1983–84	RPI
2	Edward M. Swift	60	1971–72	Cornell
	Nate Nomeland	60	2001–02	North Dakota
4	Michael J. Condon	57	2011–12	Union
5	Ronald M. Dennis	55	1982–83	Harvard
6	Edward M. Tilghman	54	1969–70	Cornell
	Scott L. Silcox	54	1978–79	Dartmouth
