= 2023–24 Princeton Tigers men's ice hockey season =

- Conference: T–9th ECAC Hockey
- Home ice: Hobey Baker Memorial Rink

Rankings
- USCHO: NR
- USA Hockey: NR

Record
- Overall: 10–16–4
- Conference: 8–11–3
- Home: 5–5–3
- Road: 5–11–1

Coaches and captains
- Head coach: Ron Fogarty
- Assistant coaches: Tommy Davis; Shane Talarico
- Captain: Ian Murphy
- Alternate captain(s): Adam Robbins, Nick Carabin

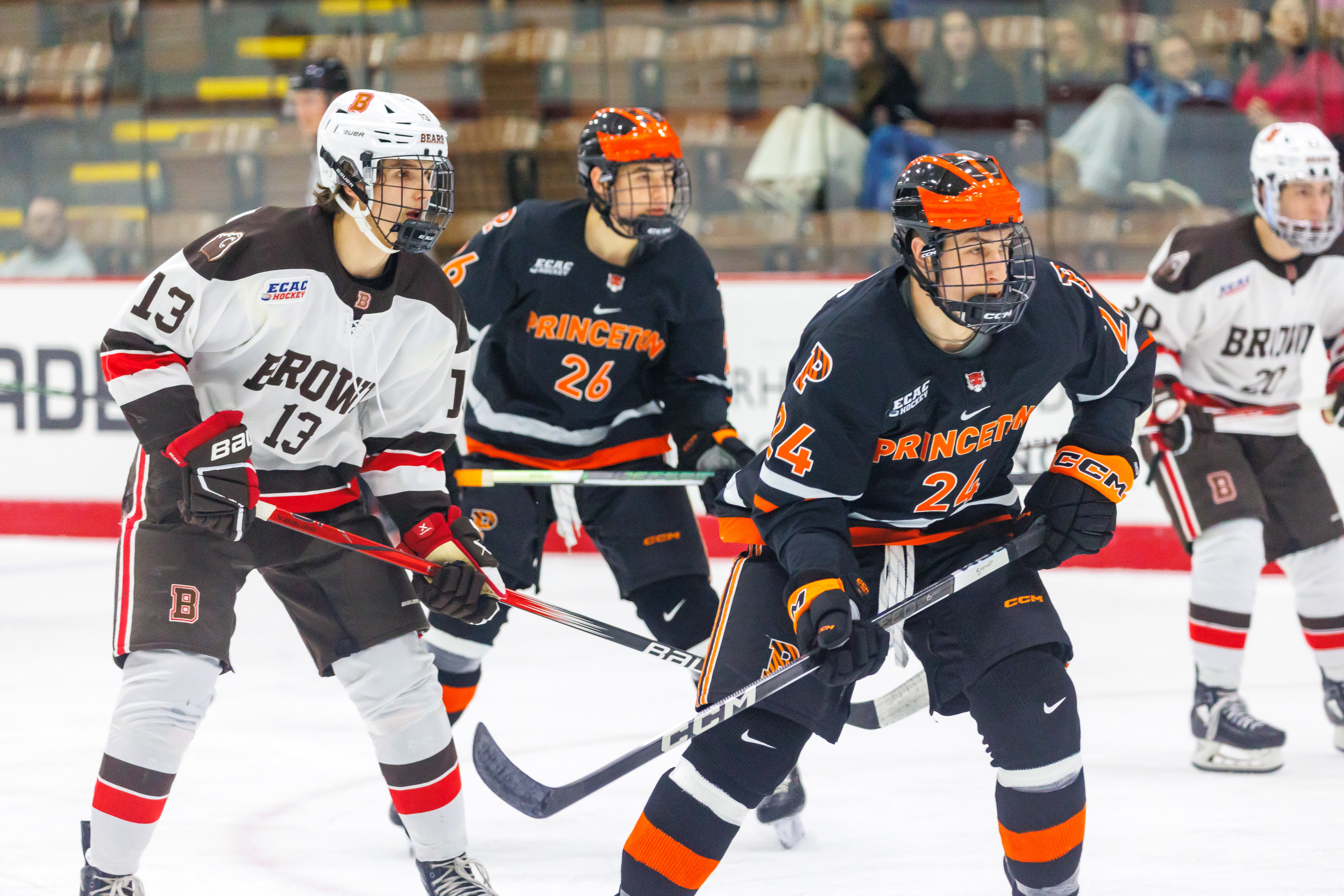
Lynden Grandberg (Brown) and Kai Daniells and David Jacobs

The 2023–24 Princeton Tigers Men's ice hockey season was the 121st season of play for the program and the 62nd in ECAC Hockey. The Tigers represented Princeton University, played their home games at the Hobey Baker Memorial Rink and were coached by Ron Fogarty in his 9th season.

== Season ==
Princeton had a decent start to its season, seeing consistent scoring in the first three weeks. With a winning record as they approached Thanksgiving, which included a win over a ranked Cornell squad, the Tigers looked better than they had in years. The only apparent issue at this time was in goal as the team had already started three separate netminders with none of them playing particularly well. By December, Arthur Smith assumed the lead role but that was as much a function of how poorly Ethan Pearson had played as anything else.

When the Tigers began the second half of their season, they had a winning record but had played mostly subpar teams. Their record was set to be tested as they would play five consecutive games against ranked opponents. Unfortunately for Princeton, they did not fare well. The offense struggled to score, averaging less than two goals per in that stretch, while the defense collapsed. The Tigers' goal crease came under siege, seeing at least 35 shots in four of those matches and the inadequate goaltending was fully exposed. Even after the team passed through the gauntlet, the goals against continued to mount; Princeton allowed at least 3 goals in every game for a month and a half. Though the offense recovered slightly once they started playing weaker opponents once more, the Tigers still went 2–9 in that stretch and tumbled down the conference standings. By the end of February the team had not only abandoned any hope of earning a bye into the quarterfinal round but they were barely clinging onto a home game in the first round. Ending the year with two losses knocked them down to 9th and forced them to travel to Boston for their playoff opener.

Princeton largely outplayed Harvard in the match, outshooting the Crimson by 21 while taking only a single penalty. Unfortunately, the Tigers picked the worst time to stop scoring and the single goal allowed by Smith was all that Harvard needed to end the Tigers' season.

After getting knocked out of the postseason, Princeton's athletic director, John Mack, announced that Ron Fogarty would not be returning as head coach.

== Departures ==
Player	Position	Nationality	Cause
Benjamin Crewe	Goaltender	United States	Returned to club team
Liam Gorman	Forward	United States	Graduate transfer to Massachusetts
Matthew Hayami	Forward	Canada	Graduation (retired)
Spencer Kersten	Forward	Canada	Graduate transfer to Bowling Green
Aidan Porter	Goaltender	United States	Graduation (retired)
Pito Walton	Defenseman	United States	Graduation (retired)

== Recruiting ==
Player	Position	Nationality	Age	Notes
Carson Buydens	Forward	Canada	19	Gladstone, MB
Conor Callaghan	Goaltender	United States	20	Upper Saddle River, NJ
Kai Daniells	Forward	Canada	20	Whistler, BC
Ian Devlin	Defenseman	United States	21	Memphis, TN
Josh Karnish	Forward	United States	20	Marlton, NJ
Arthur Smith	Goaltender	United States	19	Farmington, CT
Michael Young	Forward	United States	21	Kings Park, NY

== Roster ==
As of August 2, 2023.

No.	Nat.	Player	Class	Pos	Height	Weight	DoB	Hometown	Previous team	NHL rights
1	(United States)	Arthur Smith	Freshman	G	6' 4" (1.93 m)	205 lb (93 kg)	2004-04-30	Farmington, Connecticut	Lone Star Brahmas (NAHL)	—
3	(United States)	Mike Kennedy	Senior	D	6' 1" (1.85 m)	190 lb (86 kg)	2000-07-17	Holyoke, Massachusetts	Nanaimo Clippers (BCHL)	—
4	(United States)	David Ma	Junior	D	5' 11" (1.8 m)	180 lb (82 kg)	2002-06-22	Yonkers, New York	Chicago Steel (USHL)	—
6	(Canada)	Ian Devlin	Freshman	D	6' 2" (1.88 m)	210 lb (95 kg)	2002-01-07	Toronto, Ontario	Coquitlam Express (BCHL)	—
7	(United States)	Nick Carabin (A)	Senior	D	5' 10" (1.78 m)	175 lb (79 kg)	2000-04-30	Mahwah, New Jersey	Coquitlam Express (BCHL)	—
8	(United States)	Tyler Rubin	Sophomore	D	5' 10" (1.78 m)	175 lb (79 kg)	2003-01-10	Natick, Massachusetts	West Kelowna Warriors (BCHL)	—
9	(Canada)	MacKenzie Merriman	Senior	F	5' 11" (1.8 m)	190 lb (86 kg)	2000-04-14	White Rock, British Columbia	Nanaimo Clippers (BCHL)	—
10	(United States)	Alex Konovalov	Junior	F	5' 10" (1.78 m)	180 lb (82 kg)	2000-11-12	Basking Ridge, New Jersey	Lone Star Brahmas (NAHL)	—
11	(United States)	Jayden Sison	Sophomore	F	5' 9" (1.75 m)	185 lb (84 kg)	2003-01-27	Paoli, Pennsylvania	Coquitlam Express (BCHL)	—
12	(United States)	Ian Murphy (C)	Junior	F	5' 11" (1.8 m)	176 lb (80 kg)	1999-04-06	Scituate, Massachusetts	Tri-City Storm (USHL)	—
13	(United States)	Nick Seitz	Senior	F	6' 1" (1.85 m)	190 lb (86 kg)	2000-01-18	Manhattan, New York	New Jersey Titans (NAHL)	—
14	(Canada)	Carson Buydens	Freshman	F	6' 3" (1.91 m)	185 lb (84 kg)	2004-03-10	Gladstone, Manitoba	North Iowa Bulls (BCHL)	—
16	(United States)	Brendan Gorman	Sophomore	F	6' 0" (1.83 m)	175 lb (79 kg)	2003-02-17	Arlington, Massachusetts	Saint Sebastian's School (USHS–MA)	—
17	(United States)	Adam Robbins (A)	Senior	F	5' 8" (1.73 m)	155 lb (70 kg)	2000-04-12	New York, New York	Chicago Steel (USHL)	—
18	(United States)	Joshua Karnish	Freshman	F	5' 11" (1.8 m)	175 lb (79 kg)	2003-08-07	Marlton, New Jersey	Cedar Rapids RoughRiders (USHL)	—
19	(United States)	Jack Cronin	Junior	F	5' 11" (1.8 m)	185 lb (84 kg)	2001-03-31	South Hamilton, Massachusetts	Minnesota Magicians (NAHL)	—
20	(Canada)	Kevin Anderson	Sophomore	F	5' 11" (1.8 m)	175 lb (79 kg)	2003-09-15	Regina, Saskatchewan	Notre Dame Hounds (SJHL)	—
21	(United States)	Michael Young	Freshman	F	5' 11" (1.8 m)	185 lb (84 kg)	2002-08-28	Kings Park, New York	New Jersey Titans (NAHL)	—
22	(Canada)	Noah de la Durantaye	Junior	D	6' 1" (1.85 m)	205 lb (93 kg)	2000-05-27	Montreal, Quebec	Coquitlam Express (BCHL)	—
23	(United States)	Joe Berg	Senior	F	5' 11" (1.8 m)	185 lb (84 kg)	1999-10-07	Plano, Texas	Tri-City Storm (USHL)	—
24	(United States)	David Jacobs	Sophomore	F	5' 10" (1.78 m)	180 lb (82 kg)	2001-09-26	Needham, Massachusetts	Cowichan Valley Capitals (BCHL)	—
25	(United States)	Nick Marciano	Sophomore	D	6' 1" (1.85 m)	205 lb (93 kg)	2002-05-19	Greenwich, Connecticut	Prince George Spruce Kings (BCHL)	—
26	(Canada)	Kai Daniells	Freshman	F	6' 0" (1.83 m)	185 lb (84 kg)	2003-03-07	Whistler, British Columbia	Nanaimo Clippers (BCHL)	—
27	(United States)	Jaxson Ezman	Sophomore	F	6' 1" (1.85 m)	185 lb (84 kg)	2002-12-22	Middleton, Wisconsin	Dubuque Fighting Saints (USHL)	—
28	(Canada)	Brendan Wang	Sophomore	D	5' 11" (1.8 m)	180 lb (82 kg)	2002-02-08	Burnaby, British Columbia	Fort McMurray Oil Barons (AJHL)	—
30	(United States)	Conor Callaghan	Freshman	G	6' 0" (1.83 m)	185 lb (84 kg)	2003-03-02	Ho-Ho-Kus, New Jersey	Muskegon Lumberjacks (USHL)	—
31	(Canada)	Ethan Pearson	Junior	G	6' 2" (1.88 m)	190 lb (86 kg)	2002-07-30	Fredericton, New Brunswick	Mount Saint Charles Academy (Midget AAA)	—

=== Team photo ===
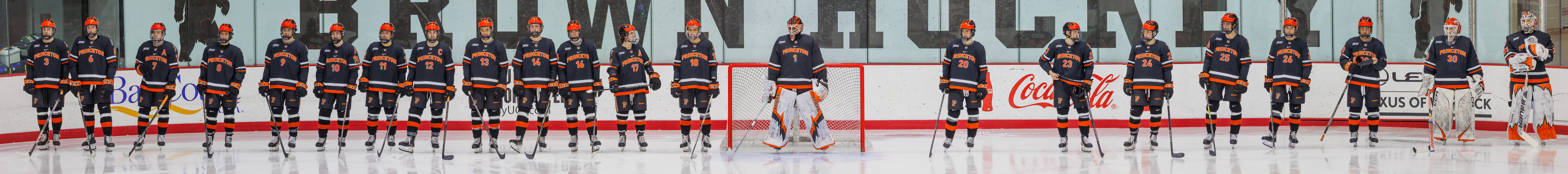
2023-2024 Princeton Tigers at Brown's Meehan Auditorium

== Standings ==
2023–24 ECAC Hockey Standings
	Conference record										Overall record					
	GP	W	L	T	OTW	OTL	SW	PTS	GF	GA	GP	W	L	T	GF	GA
#6 Quinnipiac †	22	17	4	1	0	2	0	54	99	39	39	27	10	2	160	79
#9 Cornell *	22	12	6	4	1	2	3	44	74	45	35	22	7	6	115	65
Colgate	22	13	7	2	2	2	2	43	85	68	36	16	16	4	120	112
Dartmouth	22	9	6	7	1	1	3	37	66	60	32	13	10	9	92	91
Clarkson	22	12	9	1	4	2	1	36	62	58	35	18	16	1	95	97
Union	22	9	10	3	1	1	2	32	75	75	37	16	18	3	123	121
St. Lawrence	22	8	10	4	1	1	1	29	49	64	39	14	19	6	90	118
Harvard	22	6	10	6	1	2	3	28	49	64	32	7	19	6	70	106
Princeton	22	8	11	3	4	0	2	25	70	90	30	10	16	4	89	114
Yale	22	7	13	2	1	2	1	25	46	57	30	10	18	2	63	91
Brown	22	6	14	2	2	3	1	22	43	69	30	8	19	3	61	98
Rensselaer	22	6	13	3	0	0	0	21	58	89	37	10	23	4	93	150
Championship: March 23, 2024 † indicates conference regular season champion (Cleary Cup) * indicates conference tournament champion (Whitelaw Cup); Rankings: USCHO.com Top 20 Poll

== Schedule and results ==
Date	Time	Opponent^{#}	Rank^{#}	Site	TV	Decision	Result	Attendance	Record
Exhibition
October 24	5:00 pm	at Toronto*		Hobey Baker Memorial Rink • Princeton, New Jersey	ESPN+	Smith	W 4–2	468	
Regular Season
November 3	7:00 pm	at #19 Harvard		Bright-Landry Hockey Center • Boston, Massachusetts	ESPN+	Pearson	T 4–4 ^{SOW}	150	0–0–1 (0–0–1)
November 4	7:00 pm	at Dartmouth		Thompson Arena • Hanover, New Hampshire	ESPN+	Smith	L 4–5	2,839	0–1–1 (0–1–1)
November 10	7:00 pm	Yale		Hobey Baker Memorial Rink • Princeton, New Jersey	ESPN+	Smith	W 5–4 ^{OT}	1,802	1–1–1 (1–1–1)
November 11	7:00 pm	Brown		Hobey Baker Memorial Rink • Princeton, New Jersey	ESPN+	Callaghan	W 3–2 ^{OT}	1,553	2–1–1 (2–1–1)
November 17	7:00 pm	Colgate		Hobey Baker Memorial Rink • Princeton, New Jersey	ESPN+	Callaghan	L 3–6	2,040	2–2–1 (2–2–1)
November 18	7:00 pm	#10 Cornell		Hobey Baker Memorial Rink • Princeton, New Jersey	ESPN+	Smith	W 2–1 ^{OT}	2,500	3–2–1 (3–2–1)
November 24	7:00 pm	at Ohio State*		Value City Arena • Columbus, Ohio		Smith	L 3–6	4,355	3–3–1
November 25	7:00 pm	at Ohio State*		Value City Arena • Columbus, Ohio		Pearson	L 3–4	3,010	3–4–1
December 1	7:00 pm	at Union		Achilles Rink • Schenectady, New York	ESPN+	Pearson	L 2–7	1,338	3–5–1 (3–3–1)
December 2	7:00 pm	at Rensselaer		Houston Field House • Troy, New York	ESPN+	Smith	W 6–4	2,241	4–5–1 (4–3–1)
December 8	7:00 pm	at Sacred Heart*		Martire Family Arena • Fairfield, Connecticut	FloHockey	Smith	W 4–0	3,671	5–5–1
December 9	7:00 pm	Sacred Heart*		Hobey Baker Memorial Rink • Princeton, New Jersey	ESPN+	Smith	T 2–2 ^{OT}	2,153	5–5–2
December 30	7:00 pm	Harvard		Hobey Baker Memorial Rink • Princeton, New Jersey	ESPN+	Smith	W 5–2	2,453	6–5–2 (5–3–1)
January 5	7:00 pm	at #17 New Hampshire*		Whittemore Center • Durham, New Hampshire	ESPN+	Smith	L 2–5	4,190	6–6–2
January 6	4:00 pm	at #17 New Hampshire*		Whittemore Center • Durham, New Hampshire	ESPN+	Smith	L 1–3	4,449	6–7–2
January 12	7:00 pm	at #5 Quinnipiac		M&T Bank Arena • Hamden, Connecticut	ESPN+	Smith	L 2–9	3,203	6–8–2 (5–4–1)
January 13	7:00 pm	#5 Quinnipiac		Hobey Baker Memorial Rink • Princeton, New Jersey	ESPN+	Pearson	L 1–3	2,453	6–9–2 (5–5–1)
January 19	7:00 pm	at #14 Cornell		Lynah Rink • Ithaca, New York	ESPN+	Pearson	L 2–6	4,181	6–10–2 (5–6–1)
January 20	7:00 pm	at Colgate		Class of 1965 Arena • Hamilton, New York	ESPN+	Smith	L 3–6	908	6–11–2 (5–7–1)
January 30	7:00 pm	Army*		Hobey Baker Memorial Rink • Princeton, New Jersey	ESPN+	Pearson	W 4–3 ^{OT}	1,281	7–11–2
February 2	7:00 pm	Dartmouth		Hobey Baker Memorial Rink • Princeton, New Jersey	ESPN+	Pearson	L 1–5	1,593	7–12–2 (5–8–1)
February 9	7:00 pm	at Clarkson		Cheel Arena • Potsdam, New York	ESPN+	Pearson	L 2–4	2,477	7–13–2 (5–9–1)
February 10	7:00 pm	at St. Lawrence		Appleton Arena • Canton, New York	ESPN+	Pearson	W 5–4 ^{OT}	1,168	8–13–2 (6–9–1)
February 16	7:00 pm	Rensselaer		Hobey Baker Memorial Rink • Princeton, New Jersey	ESPN+	Pearson	L 3–4	1,098	8–14–2 (6–10–1)
February 17	7:00 pm	Union		Hobey Baker Memorial Rink • Princeton, New Jersey	ESPN+	Smith	T 2–2 ^{SOW}	1,196	8–14–3 (6–10–2)
February 23	7:00 pm	at Yale		Ingalls Rink • New Haven, Connecticut	ESPN+	Smith	W 4–1	2,774	9–14–3 (7–10–2)
February 24	7:00 pm	at Brown		Meehan Auditorium • Providence, Rhode Island	ESPN+	Smith	W 5–1	895	10–14–3 (8–10–2)
March 1	7:00 pm	St. Lawrence		Hobey Baker Memorial Rink • Princeton, New Jersey	ESPN+	Pearson	T 4–4 ^{SOL}	1,258	10–14–4 (8–10–3)
March 2	7:00 pm	Clarkson		Hobey Baker Memorial Rink • Princeton, New Jersey	ESPN+	Pearson	L 2–6	1,059	10–15–4 (8–11–3)
ECAC Hockey Tournament
March 8	7:00 pm	at Harvard*		Bright-Landry Hockey Center • Boston, Massachusetts (First Round)	ESPN+	Smith	L 0–1	1,482	10–16–4
*Non-conference game. ^{#}Rankings from USCHO.com Poll. All times are in Eastern Time. Source:

== Scoring statistics ==
Name	Position	Games	Goals	Assists	Points	PIM
Adam Robbins	F	30	11	18	29	8
Brendan Gorman	C	29	7	17	24	19
David Jacobs	RW	30	7	17	24	18
Ian Murphy	C/RW	25	11	12	23	10
Nick Seitz	F	30	5	18	23	14
Jack Cronin	RW	26	11	8	19	8
Kai Daniells	F	30	8	11	19	14
Noah de la Durantaye	D	29	3	15	18	6
Nicholas Carabin	D	27	5	12	17	26
Tyler Rubin	D	30	4	9	13	22
Jaxson Ezman	F	15	4	3	7	4
Mike Kennedy	D	30	2	3	5	47
Joshua Karnish	C/LW	27	3	1	4	28
Joe Berg	F	30	2	2	4	6
Jayden Sison	RW	30	0	4	4	19
Carson Buydens	C	22	2	1	3	12
Nick Marciano	D	22	2	0	2	6
Michael Young	F	7	1	1	2	2
Kevin Anderson	F	17	1	0	1	4
Ian Devlin	D	12	0	1	1	8
Alex Konovalov	F	14	0	1	1	2
Ethan Pearson	G	15	0	1	1	0
Brendan Wang	D	25	0	1	1	8
Mackenzie Merriman	F	27	0	0	0	2
Arthur Smith	G	20	0	0	0	0
Connor Callaghan	G	5	0	0	0	0
Total			89	156	245	293

== Goaltending statistics ==
Name	Games	Minutes	Wins	Losses	Ties	Goals against	Saves	Shut outs	SV %	GAA
Arthur Smith	21	971:21	7	7	2	48	426	1	.899	2.96
Ethan Pearson	15	726:35	2	8	2	49	288	0	.855	4.05
Connor Callaghan	7	119:37	1	1	0	10	58	0	.853	5.02
Empty Net	-	23:07	-	-	-	7	-	-	-	-
Total	30	1840:40	10	16	4	114	772	1	.870	3.72

== Rankings ==
Poll	Week																										
Poll	Pre	1	2	3	4	5	6	7	8	9	10	11	12	13	14	15	16	17	18	19	20	21	22	23	24	25	26 (Final)
USCHO.com	NR	NR	NR	NR	NR	NR	NR	NR	NR	NR	NR	–	NR	NR	NR	NR	NR	NR	NR	NR	NR	NR	NR	NR	NR	–	NR
USA Hockey	NR	NR	NR	NR	NR	NR	NR	NR	NR	NR	NR	NR	–	NR	NR	NR	NR	NR	NR	NR	NR	NR	NR	NR	NR	NR	NR

Note: USCHO did not release a poll in weeks 11 and 25.
Note: USA Hockey did not release a poll in week 12.
