= Kent Manderville =

Canadian ice hockey player (born 1971)

- Born: April 12, 1971 (age 55) Edmonton, Alberta, Canada
- Height: 6 ft 3 in (191 cm)
- Weight: 200 lb (91 kg; 14 st 4 lb)
- Position: Centre
- Shot: Left
- Played for: Toronto Maple Leafs; Edmonton Oilers; Hartford Whalers; Carolina Hurricanes; Philadelphia Flyers; Pittsburgh Penguins; Timrå Red Eagles; Espoo Blues
- National team: Canada
- NHL draft: 24th overall, 1989; Calgary Flames
- Playing career: 1991–2007
Medal record
Representing Canada
Men's ice hockey
World Juniors Championship
Gold medal – first place	1990 Finland	Ice hockey
Gold medal – first place	1991 Canada	Ice hockey
Winter Olympic Games
Silver medal – second place	1992 Albertville	Ice hockey

Kent Stephen Manderville (born April 12, 1971) is a Canadian former professional ice hockey player who played in the National Hockey League for the Toronto Maple Leafs, Edmonton Oilers, Hartford Whalers/Carolina Hurricanes, Philadelphia Flyers and the Pittsburgh Penguins. Manderville was born in Edmonton, Alberta.

== Career ==
Manderville was drafted 24th overall in the second round by the Calgary Flames in the 1989 NHL entry draft and played for Cornell University from 1989 to 1991. While in school Manderville also played for Canada in the World Junior Ice Hockey Championship in 1990 and 1991, winning the gold medal in both years. Manderville left Cornell after two seasons to join the Canadian national team and played in the 1992 Winter Olympics where the team won the silver medal. Following the Olympics he opted to turn professional and joined the Toronto Maple Leafs, who had obtained his rights from Calgary in a trade, for the remainder of the 1991–1992 season.

Manderville played in 646 regular season NHL games, scoring 37 goals and 67 assists for 104 points, picking up 348 penalty minutes. He played in 67 NHL playoff games registering 3 goals and 3 assists.

On March 12, 1997, as a member of the Hartford Whalers, he scored the only hat trick of his NHL career in a 6-3 victory over the Boston Bruins.

After his NHL career, he played three seasons for Timrå IK of the Elitserien in Sweden from 2003 to 2006. His final hockey season (2006–2007) was spent with the Espoo Blues of the SM-liiga in Finland. After four years in Northern Europe he retired in 2007 and was accepted to attend law school at the University of Ottawa. He deferred admission for a year and then ultimately decided to decline the offer, instead opting to complete his Cornell University Bachelor of Science degree. He was an analyst for televised Ottawa Senators games on A Ottawa during the 2007-08 season. In the week of June 23, 2008, he presented the sportscast for A-News at 6 and 11 pm.

He has also passed all three Chartered Financial Analyst (CFA) exams and was awarded the Certified Financial Planner (CFP) designation in September, 2020. He is now a portfolio manager with Polaris Wealth, an Ottawa-based wealth management firm that specializes in comprehensive wealth management for clients.

== Career statistics ==
=== Regular season and playoffs ===
			Regular season					Playoffs
Season	Team	League	GP	G	A	Pts	PIM	GP	G	A	Pts	PIM
1988–89	Notre Dame Hounds	SJHL	58	39	36	75	165	—	—	—	—	—
1989–90	Cornell University	ECAC	26	11	15	26	28	—	—	—	—	—
1990–91	Cornell University	ECAC	28	17	14	31	60	—	—	—	—	—
1990–91	Canada	Intl	3	1	2	3	0	—	—	—	—	—
1991–92	Toronto Maple Leafs	NHL	15	0	4	4	0	—	—	—	—	—
1991–92	St. John's Maple Leafs	AHL	—	—	—	—	—	12	5	9	14	14
1991–92	Canada	Intl	63	16	24	40	78	—	—	—	—	—
1992–93	Toronto Maple Leafs	NHL	18	1	1	2	17	18	1	0	1	8
1992–93	St. John's Maple Leafs	AHL	56	19	28	47	86	2	0	2	2	0
1993–94	Toronto Maple Leafs	NHL	67	7	9	16	63	12	1	0	1	4
1994–95	Toronto Maple Leafs	NHL	36	0	1	1	22	7	0	0	0	6
1995–96	St. John's Maple Leafs	AHL	27	16	12	28	26	—	—	—	—	—
1995–96	Edmonton Oilers	NHL	37	3	5	8	38	—	—	—	—	—
1996–97	Hartford Whalers	NHL	44	6	5	11	18	—	—	—	—	—
1996–97	Springfield Falcons	AHL	23	5	20	25	18	—	—	—	—	—
1997–98	Carolina Hurricanes	NHL	77	4	4	8	31	—	—	—	—	—
1998–99	Carolina Hurricanes	NHL	81	5	11	16	38	6	0	0	0	2
1999–2000	Carolina Hurricanes	NHL	56	1	4	5	12	—	—	—	—	—
1999–2000	Philadelphia Flyers	NHL	13	0	3	3	4	18	0	1	1	22
2000–01	Philadelphia Flyers	NHL	82	5	10	15	47	6	1	2	3	2
2001–02	Philadelphia Flyers	NHL	34	2	5	7	8	—	—	—	—	—
2001–02	Pittsburgh Penguins	NHL	4	1	0	1	4	—	—	—	—	—
2002–03	Pittsburgh Penguins	NHL	82	2	5	7	46	—	—	—	—	—
2003–04	Timrå IK	SEL	23	3	8	11	18	9	2	2	4	47
2004–05	Timrå IK	SEL	34	9	3	12	90	7	0	1	1	18
2005–06	Timrå IK	SEL	43	11	9	20	79	—	—	—	—	—
2006–07	Espoo Blues	Liiga	45	19	17	36	86	8	1	3	4	20
NHL totals			646	37	67	104	348	67	3	3	6	44
AHL totals			106	40	60	100	130	14	5	11	16	14
SEL totals			100	23	20	43	187	16	2	3	5	65

=== International ===
Year	Team	Event	Result	GP	G	A	Pts	PIM
1990	Canada	WJC	1st place, gold medalist(s)	7	1	2	3	0
1991	Canada	WJC	1st place, gold medalist(s)	7	1	6	7	0
1992	Canada	OG	2nd place, silver medalist(s)	8	1	2	3	0

== Awards and honors ==
Award	Year
All-ECAC Hockey Rookie Team	1989–90
ECAC Rookie of the Year	1990

== Transactions ==
- January 2, 1992 – Traded to the Toronto Maple Leafs by the Calgary Flames with Doug Gilmour, Jamie Macoun, Rick Wamsley and Ric Nattress for Gary Leeman, Alexander Godynyuk, Jeff Reese, Michel Petit and Craig Berube.
- December 4, 1995 – Traded to the Edmonton Oilers by the Toronto Maple Leafs for Peter White and Edmonton's fourth round choice (Jason Sessa) in 1996 NHL entry draft.
- October 2, 1996 – Signed as a free agent by the Hartford Whalers.
- June 25, 1997 – Transferred to the Carolina Hurricanes after the Hartford Whalers franchise relocated.
- March 14, 2000 – Traded to the Philadelphia Flyers by the Carolina Hurricanes for Sandy McCarthy.
- March 17, 2002 – Traded to the Pittsburgh Penguins by the Philadelphia Flyers for Billy Tibbetts.
- November 21, 2003 – Signed as a free agent by the Timrå IK.
- June 29, 2006 – Signed as a free agent by the Kloten Flyers.

Awards and achievements
Preceded by Andre Faust	ECAC Hockey Rookie of the Year; 1989–90	Succeeded by Geoff Finch
