= Len Quesnelle =

Canadian ice hockey player and coach

Current position
- Title: Assistant coach
- Team: Boston University
- Conference: Hockey East

Biographical details
- Born: May 24, 1966 (age 60); Bramalea, Chinguacousy Township, Ontario, Canada
- Education: Princeton University

Playing career
- 1984–1988: Princeton
- Position: Defenseman

Coaching career (HC unless noted)
- 1988–2000: Princeton (assistant)
- 2000–2004: Princeton
- 2004–2013: Massachusetts (assistant)
- 2013–2017: Detroit Red Wings (Scout)
- 2017- present: Boston University (assistant)

Head coaching record
- Overall: 29–84–11 (.278)

Leonard 'Lenny' Quesnelle is a Canadian ice hockey former player and head coach who is most well known for his long tenure with the men's program at Princeton.

== Career ==
Quesnelle started his college career with Princeton in 1984, playing for the ice hockey team for four seasons. After graduating in 1988 he stayed on as an assistant with the program and served in that capacity for the next twelve years. When Don Cahoon left to take the position at Massachusetts in 2000 Quesnelle was selected as his successor.

In his first two seasons leading the program Quesnelle's Tigers finished with subpar records but no worse than Princeton faithful were used to seeing. Beginning in his third campaign the team took a downturn, finishing dead-last in the conference with a 3-win season. The following year started off much better but the team went winless after December 16 and finished in last place for a second year in a row. Shortly after the season ended Quesnelle was fired, ending his 20-year career at Princeton.

Quesnelle joined his former boss as an assistant at Massachusetts the following season and worked for the Minutemen for nine years. After Cahoon retired in 2012 Quesnelle was still under contract for a year so he stayed on under the new regime before leaving in 2013.

After leaving UMass Quesnelle was hired by the Detroit Red Wings as an amateur scout for the New England area.

== Personal ==
As of 2017, Quesnelle resided in Sunderland, Massachusetts with his wife and two daughters.

== College Head Coaching record ==
Record table
Season	Team	Overall	Conference	Standing	Postseason
Princeton Tigers (ECAC Hockey) (2000–2004)
2000–01	Princeton	10–16–5	9–9–4	7th	ECAC Hockey First Round
2001–02	Princeton	11–18–2	10–10–2	t-6th	ECAC Hockey First Round
2002–03	Princeton	3–26–2	2–18–2	12th	ECAC Hockey First Round
2003–04	Princeton	5–24–2	5–15–2	12th	ECAC Hockey First Round
Princeton:		29–84–11	26–52–10		
Total:		29–84–11			
National champion Postseason invitational champion Conference regular season champion Conference regular season and conference tournament champion Division regular season champion Division regular season and conference tournament champion Conference tournament champion
