= Ron Fogarty =

Canadian ice hockey player and coach (born 1972)

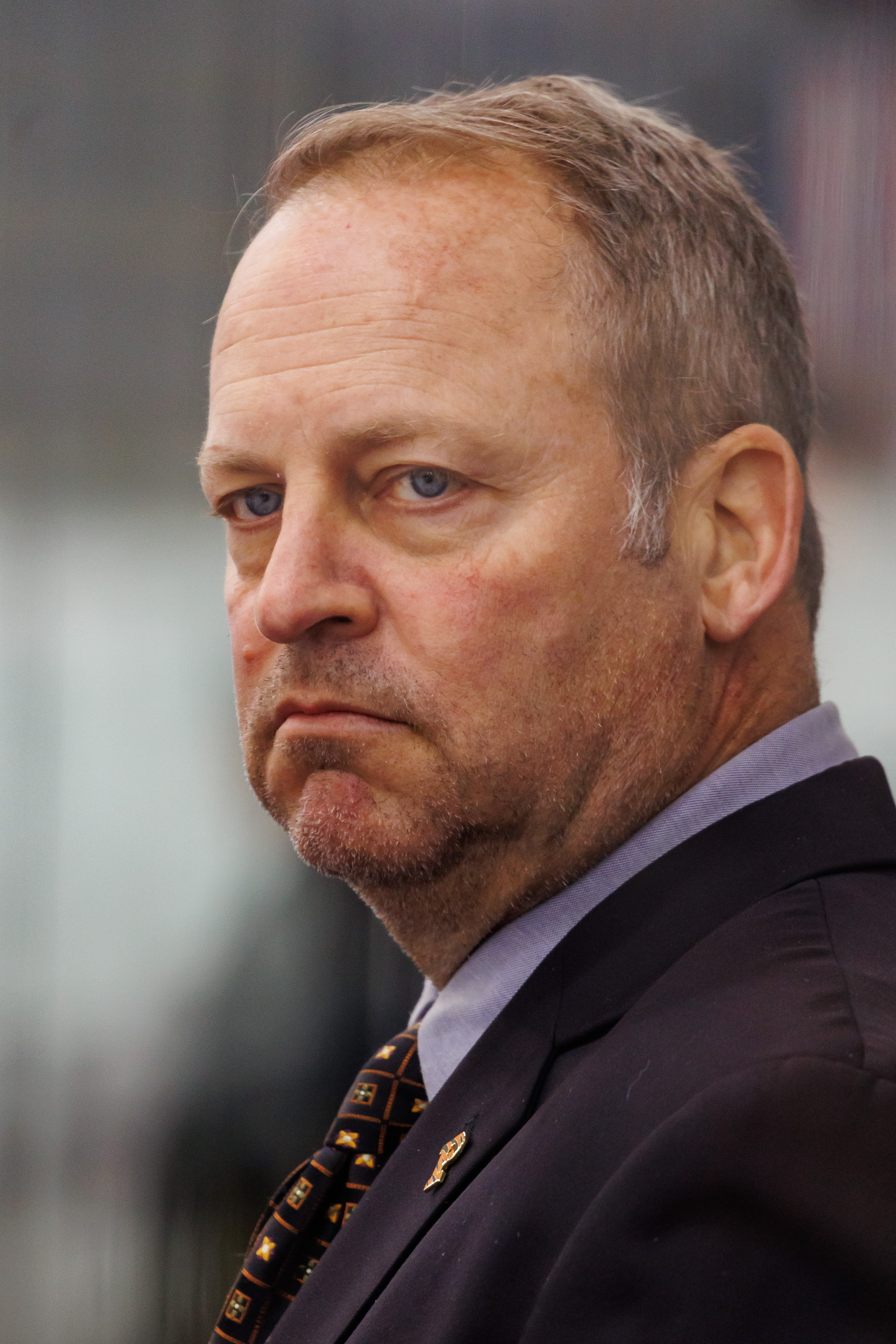
- Fogarty with the Princeton Tigers in 2024

Biographical details
- Born: April 30, 1972 (age 54); Sarnia, Ontario, Canada
- Education: Colgate University

Playing career
- 1991–1995: Colgate
- 1995–1996: Memphis RiverKings
- 2006–2007: Petrolia Squires
- Position: Center

Coaching career (HC unless noted)
- 1996–1999: Colgate (Assistant)
- 1999–2002: Clarkson (Assistant)
- 2002–2006: Bowling Green (Assistant)
- 2006–2007: Petrolia Squires
- 2007–2014: Adrian College
- 2014–2024: Princeton
- 2024: Asiago Hockey 1935
- 2025–: Omaha Lancers

Head coaching record
- Overall: 279–195–41 (.582)
- Tournaments: 2–5 (.286)

Accomplishments and honors

Championships
- 2008 MCHA Champion; 2008 MCHA tournament champion 2009 MCHA Champion; 2009 MCHA tournament champion 2010 MCHA Champion; 2010 MCHA tournament champion 2011 MCHA Champion; 2011 MCHA tournament champion 2012 MCHA Champion; 2013 MCHA Champion; 2013 MCHA tournament champion 2018 ECAC Tournament champion

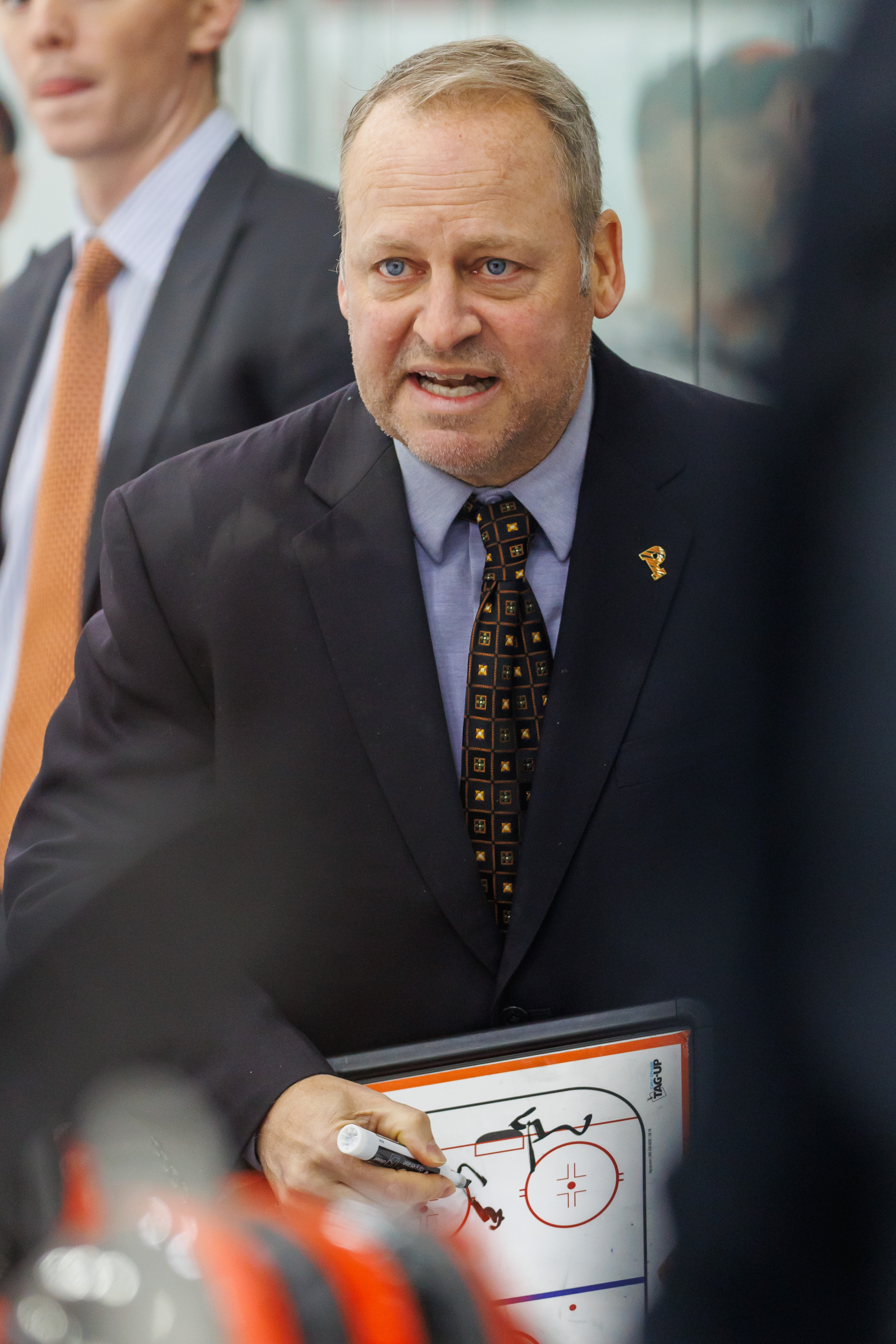
Fogarty diagrams a play

Ron Fogarty is a Canadian ice hockey coach and former player who is currently the head coach of the Omaha Lancers in the USHL. Fogarty was previously head coach of the men's program at Princeton University from 2014 through 2024.

== Career ==
Fogarty started his college career as a player for Colgate in 1991. He spent four years with the program, serving as team captain in his senior season. After graduating Fogarty spent one year with the Memphis Riverkings before returning to his alma mater as an assistant coach. He spent three more years with the Red Raiders before accepting a similar position with Clarkson and eventually Bowling Green.

In 2006 Fogarty was selected as the first head coach for Division III Adrian College men's team and spent the next season as a player-coach for the Petrolia Squires of the Western Ontario Senior League while Adrian's facility was being completed. The Bulldogs hit the ground running under Fogarty compiling a 26-3 record in their first season, winning both the conference and conference tournament titles, but failed to be selected for the NCAA tournament. They repeated the same feat in each of the following three seasons and were finally allowed into the national postseason in their third year. Fogarty's fourth campaign with the Bulldogs saw the program reach the national title game, falling to #1-seeded St. Norbert 4-3. Fogarty coached at Adrian for three more years and never failed to get his team to record at least 20 wins in a season.

Fogarty left the Bulldogs in 2014 when he was offered the head coaching job at Princeton. The Tigers had fallen in the standings over the previous three seasons and that trend continued in Fogarty's first two years with the team managing only 4 and 5 wins. His third season saw a large improvement with the team tripling its win total from the year before and through the Tigers failed to post a winning season it was their best performance since Guy Gadowsky left in 2011. In his fourth season with the program, Fogarty led Princeton to a surprising conference championship as a 7th-seed. The title earned Princeton just its fourth trip to the NCAA tournament. Unfortunately, that was Fogarty's only winning season with Princeton and the Tigers would never come close to repeating their 2018 season. In 2024, after 10 years with the Tigers, Fogarty's contract was not renewed and he was out as head coach.

After departing Princeton, Fogarty made his professional coaching debut in April 2024 with Asiago of Italy. After a string of eight consecutive defeats, he was released by the club in December 2024.

Fogarty returned to the US in February 2025 when he was announced as the new head coach of the Omaha Lancers of the USHL.

== College Head Coaching record ==
Record table
Season	Team	Overall	Conference	Standing	Postseason
Adrian Bulldogs (MCHA) (2007–2013)
2007–08	Adrian	26–3–0	19–1–0	1st	MCHA Tournament Champion
2008–09	Adrian	27–1–1	20–0–0	1st	MCHA Tournament Champion
2009–10	Adrian	24–4–0	20–0–0	1st	NCAA First Round
2010–11	Adrian	25–4–1	18–1–1	1st	NCAA Runner-Up
2011–12	Adrian	20–6–1	17–2–1	1st	MCHA Runner-Up
2012–13	Adrian	23–2–3	17–0–3	1st	NCAA Quarterfinals
Adrian:		167–23–10	125–5–8		
Adrian Bulldogs (NCHA) (2013–2014)
2013–14	Adrian	22–3–4	14–1–3	2nd	NCAA Quarterfinals
Princeton Tigers (ECAC Hockey) (2014–2024)
2014–15	Princeton	4–23–3	2–18–2	12th	ECAC Hockey First Round
2015–16	Princeton	5–23–3	3–16–3	12th	ECAC Hockey Quarterfinals
2016–17	Princeton	15–16–3	8–11–3	7th	ECAC Hockey First Round
2017–18	Princeton	19–13–4	10–10–2	7th	NCAA Midwest Regional Semifinals
2018–19	Princeton	10–18–3	8–12–2	9th	ECAC Hockey First Round
2019–20	Princeton	6–20–5	2–16–4	11th	Tournament Cancelled
2021–22	Princeton	8–21–2	7–14–1	10th	ECAC First Round
2022–23	Princeton	13–19–0	8–14–0	T–7th	ECAC Quarterfinals
2023–24	Princeton	10–16–4	8–11–3	T–9th	ECAC First Round
Princeton:		90–169–27	56–112–20		
Total:		279–195–41			
National champion Postseason invitational champion Conference regular season champion Conference regular season and conference tournament champion Division regular season champion Division regular season and conference tournament champion Conference tournament champion

== USHL record ==
Team	Year	Regular season							Postseason
Team	Year	G	W	L	OTL	SOL	Pts	Finish	Result
Omaha Lancers	2024–25	21	1	18	2	–	(3)	8th in West	
Omaha Lancers	2025-26	17	4	12	1	–	(9)	West	
Totals		38	5	30	3		—	—	—
