= West Island College =

Private school network in Canada

- Old logo of WIC
- Canada

Information
- School type: Private preparatory school
- Motto: Praestantiam Consectemur (Latin for 'Let Us Pursue Excellence')
- Established: 1974
- Founder: Terry D. Davies
- Colour
- Accreditation: CAIS

West Island College (WIC) is a system of three Canadian private schools: West Island College Montreal, founded in 1974, West Island College Calgary, founded in 1982, and Class Afloat–West Island College International, founded in 1984.

While the schools historically shared varying levels of affiliation, each school now operates independently. A West Island College school was opened briefly in Ottawa, Ontario, but is no longer in operation.

Each school was founded by Terry D. Davies, with Jack Grant playing a significant role as well, as fully French immersion (no English stream). The two met while teaching French at Riverdale High School. Grant was particularly instrumental in founding WIC Calgary after Grant joined WIC Montreal in 1975.

== West Island College (Montreal) ==
West Island College Montreal
- 851 Tecumseh, Dollard-des-Ormeaux, Québec

Information
- Established: 1974
- Team name: Voyagers
- School fees: $12,565 CAD
- Website: wicmtl.ca

West Island College Montreal was the first West Island school to open and was founded in 1974 to provide an academic program dedicated to preparing students for post secondary education. The first year it only had 40 grade 7 students. The following year the total school population increased to 80 and included grade 8 students, progressing from grade 7.

It was first established in Pointe-Claire, Quebec, on Montreal's West Island, an area at the western end of the island of Montreal. The school moved to its present location in Dollard-des-Ormeaux in 1978 in order to accommodate a growing student body. Today West Island College in Montreal has an annual enrolment of 400 students, and includes both a French school and an English school housed within the same facility.

== West Island College (Calgary) ==
West Island College Calgary
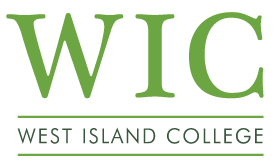
- 7410 Blackfoot Trail S.E. Calgary, Alberta

Information
- Established: 1982
- Principal: Don Middleton (Senior School) Tracy Armitage (Junior School)
- Head of school: Erin Corbett
- Grades: 7-12
- Enrollment: 620
- Houses: Davies, Bedard, Goodall, Grant
- Team name: Wolves
- School fees: $20,568 CDN for Alberta Residents
- Website: www.westislandcollege.ab.ca

Jack Grant and Terry Davies envisioned having a school in each province of Canada. Alberta was chosen as the next province, after Quebec, due to strong demand for French immersion programs.

In 1982, West Island College Calgary was then opened. The first year 39 students enrolled evenly between grades 7 and 8. The original campus was located in the Atrium at Riverbend.

In 1984, The pair met a school inspector, Wayne Moss while he was observing the school. Impressed, the pair hired him as the new Head of School. Moss then secured a new campus in the vacant Le Roi Daniels School at a lower rate due to his connections with the Calgary Board of Education. WIC Calgary then moved to the location calling it the "Fairview campus on Fyffe road".

In 1985, due to lower enrolment, Grant reassumed the Head of School role.

The school moved to its present location at 7410 Blackfoot Trail S.E., Calgary in 1994 in order to accommodate a growing student body. Davies secured the purchase of the building from an engineering firm and made a handshake deal with the neighbouring building, a wine warehouse, that WIC would be given the first option to purchase the facility.

The college has expanded to the wine warehouse adjacent to the original site. Today West Island College in Calgary has an annual enrolment of 600+ students, and includes both a French immersion track and an English track housed within the same facility.

== Class Afloat—West Island College International ==
Class Afloat—West Island College International

Information
- School type: Sailing; Experiential Education
- Motto: Learn. Sail. Discover.
- Established: 1984

In 1984 the United Nations, under the banner of "International Youth Year", invited schools and agencies worldwide to interpret the themes of "participation, development, and peace". Founder of West Island College, Terry Davies, interpreted those themes by taking a group of students and teachers on an extended field trip aboard the chartered sailing vessel Pogoria to visit other students in countries around the world.

In 1992 the school commissioned the building of their own ship, the S/V Concordia. During the 2008/2009 year, the school operated a second vessel named the SY Fryderyk Chopin in addition to the S/V Concordia. Students enrolled in the high school program were placed upon the Concordia, while students in the gap year program were placed on the Fryderyk Chopin.

On February 17, 2010, The Concordia was knocked down in a squall and subsequently sank, about 550 km from the coast of the state of Rio de Janeiro, Brazil. All the passengers and the crew were rescued without serious injuries by two merchant ships after being located by the Brazilian Navy.

Class Afloat continues to be a co-educational sailing program that provides high school credit to students while living aboard a tall ship. From 2014 to 2021 Class Afloat has chartered the Dutch Flagship Gulden Leeuw; between 2010 and 2014 Class Afloat operated on the SS Sørlandet, a fully rigged Norwegian vessel, built in 1927. Since 2021 Class Afloat has used the German Flagship Alexander von Humboldt II.

The ship operates with a full complement of professional crew, administration, teachers and students. It sailed a different route every year and it circumnavigated the globe many times.

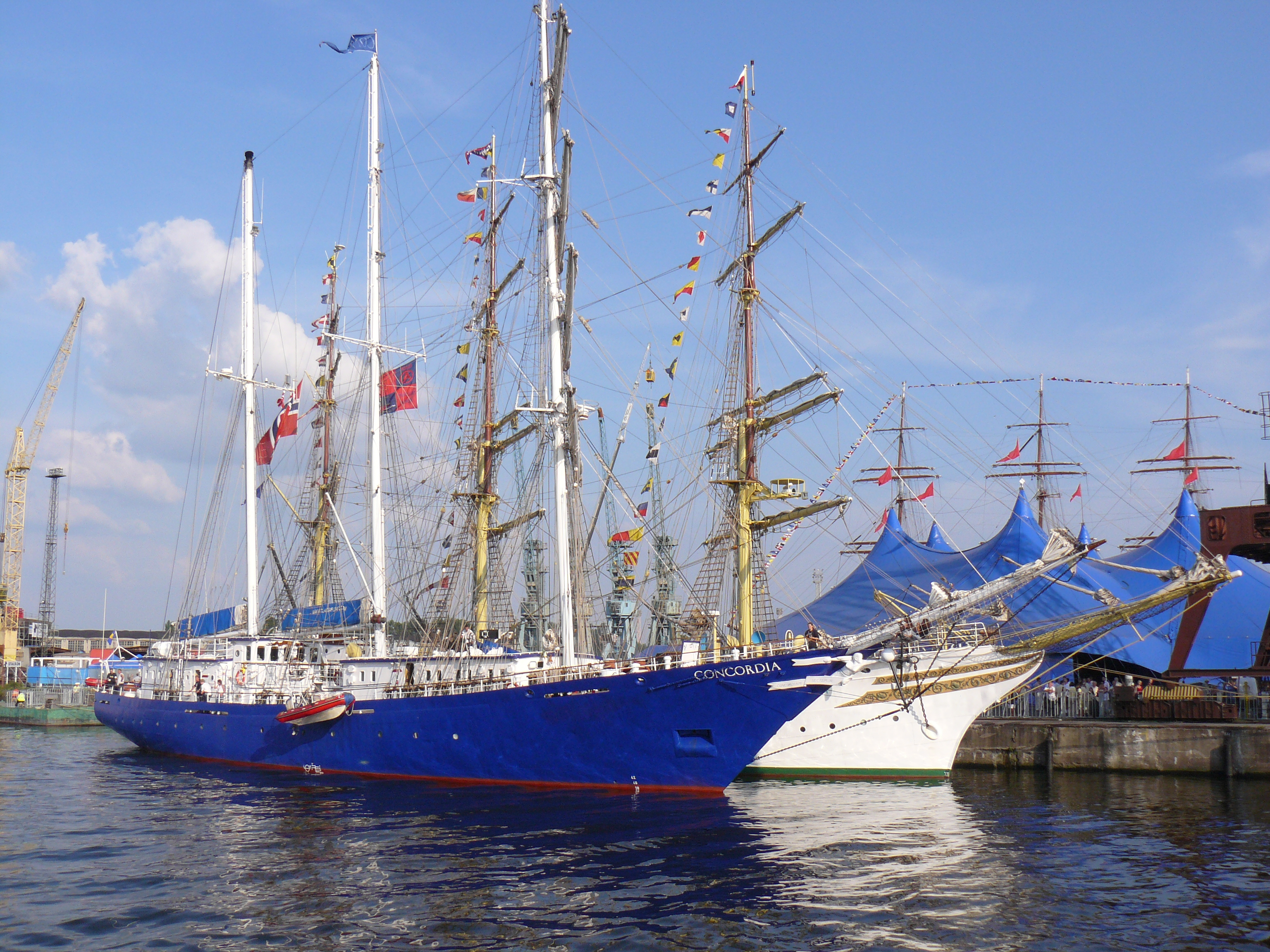
The S/V Concordia alongside the program's current vessel SS Sørlandet.

Students enrolled can sail for one or two semesters during which time they learn seamanship and work as crew members while earning high school or university credit with help from their on board teachers. Port programs in the cities visited provide the students with an opportunity to meet and interact with other cultures, giving them an international perspective on their education. Since the first voyage, more than 1,700 students have attended and the voyages combined have sailed more than 700,000 nautical miles to over 250 ports of call worldwide. Any student from grades 11, 12, university or gap year may take part in Class Afloat so long as they pass the application process.

== Notable alumni ==
- Alex Killorn (born 1989), WIC Montreal, hockey player for NHL's Anaheim Ducks
- Devon Levi (born 2001), WIC Montreal, ice hockey goalie, Northeastern Huskies, Canada men's national junior ice hockey team
- Adam Lowry (born 1993), WIC Calgary, American-born Canadian hockey player for NHL's Winnipeg Jets
- Manjit Minhas (born 1980), WIC Calgary, owns tenth-largest brewery in North America
- Hunter Shinkaruk (born 1994), WIC Calgary, hockey player
- Josh Teves (born 1995), WIC Calgary, hockey player
- Marc-Édouard Vlasic (born 1987), WIC Montreal, hockey player for NHL's San Jose Sharks

== Heads of School ==
Heads of School at West Island College, Montreal
Year	Name
1979	Jack A. Grant
2020–present	Eric Jabal

Heads of School at West Island College, Calgary
Year	Name
1982–1984	Jack A. Grant
1984	Wayne Moss
1985–2009	Jack A. Grant
2009–2018	Carol Grant-Watt
2018–2020	Chantal Gionet
Interim	Gord Goodwin
2021-	Erin Corbett
