= Taylor Fedun =

Canadian ice hockey player (born 1988)

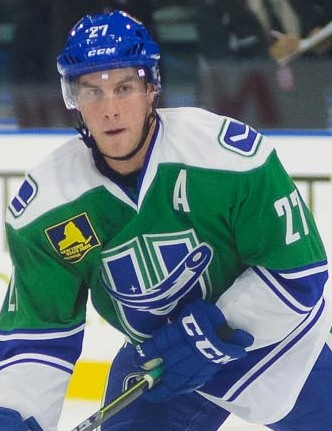
- Fedun with the Utica Comets in 2015
- Born: June 4, 1988 (age 38) Edmonton, Alberta, Canada
- Height: 6 ft 0 in (183 cm)
- Weight: 201 lb (91 kg; 14 st 5 lb)
- Position: Defence
- Shoots: Right
- NHL team Former teams: Free agent Edmonton Oilers; San Jose Sharks; Vancouver Canucks; Buffalo Sabres; Dallas Stars; Pittsburgh Penguins
- NHL draft: Undrafted
- Playing career: 2012–present

Taylor William Fedun (born June 4, 1988) is a Canadian ice hockey defenceman who is currently an unrestricted free agent. He most recently played with the Wilkes-Barre/Scranton Penguins in the American Hockey League (AHL) while under contract to the Pittsburgh Penguins of the National Hockey League (NHL).

== Playing career ==
Undrafted, Fedun played one final season in the Alberta Junior Hockey League (AJHL), skating in 50 games for the Spruce Grove Saints. He led all team defenceman in scoring with ten goals and 43 points.

The following season, Fedun joined the Princeton Tigers of ECAC Hockey conference in the NCAA Division I. In his first year with the club, he scored four goals and 14 points in 32 games. Fedun remained with the Tigers for an additional three seasons, where he became team captain in his final year.

On March 8, 2011, the Edmonton Oilers signed Fedun to a two-year contract.

Fedun impressed the Oilers at the 2011 Young Stars Tournament in Penticton, British Columbia, and continued to impress throughout the Oilers' pre-season games. He remained on the roster after other young high performers, such as Tyler Pitlick and Curtis Hamilton, had been assigned to the team's American Hockey League (AHL) affiliate, the Oklahoma City Barons.

Prior to the 2011–12 season, when the Oilers' roster sat at 32 players, with nine more needing to be cut before the team's final roster was made, Fedun was tripped by the Minnesota Wild's forward, Eric Nystrom, and fractured his femur during a preseason game while attempting to retrieve the puck and force an icing. Fedun suffered a complex fracture to his right femur and missed the entire 2011–12 season after a rod was put in his leg. This was the second time the NHL's icing policy led to a fractured femur in the post-lockout era, with the previous injury occurring to former Wild defenseman Kurtis Foster in 2007. The icing rule was changed for the 2013–14 season to reduce the risk for potentially damaging collisions.

Fedun returned the following season, playing entirely with the Barons. In his first professional season, he recorded 27 points in 70 games.

Fedun scored his first career NHL goal on November 5, 2013, against Florida Panthers' goaltender Jacob Markstrom. He appeared in an additional three games for the Oilers that season, scoring another goal. However, Fedun primarily played for the Barons that season.

With the Oilers not tendering Fedun a qualifying offer, he was released to free agency, and on July 1, 2014, signed a one-year contract with the San Jose Sharks. In his lone season with the organization, Fedun recorded four assists in seven games for the Sharks. He also appeared in 65 games for the team's AHL affiliate, the Worcester Sharks.

On July 1, 2015, Fedun signed a one-year, two-way contract as a free agent with the Vancouver Canucks. He skated in one game for the Canucks, as well as 63 for their AHL affiliate, the Utica Comets.

On July 1, 2016, Fedun left the Canucks organization and signed a one-year, two-way contract as a free agent with the Buffalo Sabres. He split the 2016–17 season between the Sabres and their AHL affiliate, the Rochester Americans.

During the 2018–19 season, on November 10, 2018, while with the Rochester Americans, the Sabres traded Fedun to the Dallas Stars in exchange for a 2020 conditional seventh-round pick. On November 23, 2018, in his Stars debut, Fedun scored his first NHL goal in five years and third of his career in a 6–4 win against the Ottawa Senators. He stayed on the Stars' roster for the remainder of the season, posting new career highs of 4 goals and 11 points in 54 regular season games. He was also recognized by the Stars as the team's nomination for the Bill Masterton Trophy for his perseverance and dedication to hockey.

On June 27, 2019, Fedun agreed to a two-year, two-way contract extension to remain with Dallas.

Following his third season within the Stars organization, Fedun left as a free agent and was signed to a one-year, two-way contract with the Pittsburgh Penguins on July 28, 2021.

On July 1, 2024, Fedun's contract with the Penguins expired. He was not tendered a new deal and consequently left the team as an unrestricted free agent. Fedun seemingly sat out the 2024–25 AHL season, having yet to sign with another team.

== Personal life ==
In June 2018, he married field hockey player Katie Reinprecht.

== Career statistics ==
			Regular season					Playoffs
Season	Team	League	GP	G	A	Pts	PIM	GP	G	A	Pts	PIM
2004–05	Fort Saskatchewan Traders	AJHL	1	0	1	1	0	—	—	—	—	—
2005–06	Fort Saskatchewan Traders	AJHL	60	13	18	31	72	3	1	1	2	4
2006–07	Spruce Grove Saints	AJHL	50	10	33	43	103	10	3	5	8	31
2007–08	Princeton University	ECAC	32	4	10	14	32	—	—	—	—	—
2008–09	Princeton University	ECAC	35	3	12	15	50	—	—	—	—	—
2009–10	Princeton University	ECAC	31	3	14	17	34	—	—	—	—	—
2010–11	Princeton University	ECAC	29	10	12	22	38	—	—	—	—	—
2012–13	Oklahoma City Barons	AHL	70	8	19	27	30	17	3	3	6	6
2013–14	Oklahoma City Barons	AHL	63	11	26	37	51	3	0	1	1	4
2013–14	Edmonton Oilers	NHL	4	2	0	2	0	—	—	—	—	—
2014–15	Worcester Sharks	AHL	65	6	28	34	37	4	1	0	1	6
2014–15	San Jose Sharks	NHL	7	0	4	4	4	—	—	—	—	—
2015–16	Utica Comets	AHL	63	8	25	33	48	4	0	0	0	4
2015–16	Vancouver Canucks	NHL	1	0	1	1	0	—	—	—	—	—
2016–17	Rochester Americans	AHL	29	5	18	23	29	—	—	—	—	—
2016–17	Buffalo Sabres	NHL	27	0	7	7	16	—	—	—	—	—
2017–18	Rochester Americans	AHL	45	3	13	16	32	3	0	0	0	2
2017–18	Buffalo Sabres	NHL	7	0	1	1	2	—	—	—	—	—
2018–19	Rochester Americans	AHL	9	0	5	5	2	—	—	—	—	—
2018–19	Texas Stars	AHL	3	1	2	3	4	—	—	—	—	—
2018–19	Dallas Stars	NHL	54	4	7	11	14	7	0	0	0	2
2019–20	Dallas Stars	NHL	27	2	7	9	8	11	0	0	0	4
2019–20	Texas Stars	AHL	5	0	2	2	8	—	—	—	—	—
2020–21	Texas Stars	AHL	2	0	0	0	4	—	—	—	—	—
2021–22	Wilkes-Barre/Scranton Penguins	AHL	44	5	11	16	18	—	—	—	—	—
2022–23	Wilkes-Barre/Scranton Penguins	AHL	58	3	8	11	22	—	—	—	—	—
2022–23	Pittsburgh Penguins	NHL	4	0	0	0	0	—	—	—	—	—
2023–24	Wilkes-Barre/Scranton Penguins	AHL	43	1	11	12	42	2	0	0	0	0
NHL totals			131	8	27	35	44	18	0	0	0	6

== Awards and honours ==
Award	Year
College
All-ECAC Hockey Second Team	2009–10
All-ECAC Hockey First Team	2010–11
AHCA East Second-Team All-American	2010–11
