= Concordia (ship) =

Steel-hulled barquentine

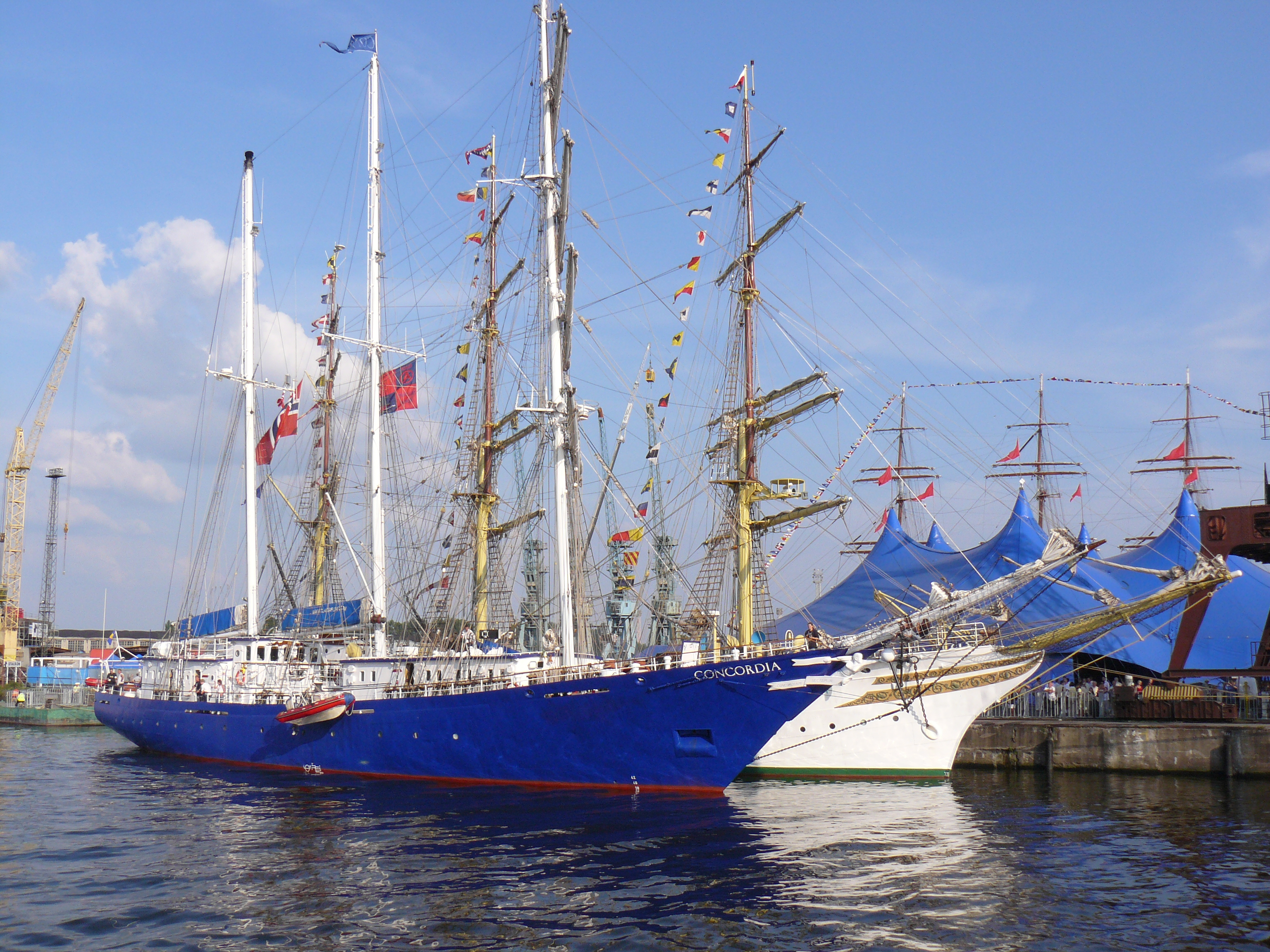
- Concordia and Sørlandet in 2007.

History
- Name: Concordia
- Owner: West Island College, Montreal
- Port of registry: (The Bahamas) Nassau, Bahamas (1992– ); Bridgetown, Barbados ( -2010)
- Builder: Colod, Szczecin
- Launched: 1992
- Completed: 1992
- In service: April 1992
- Out of service: 17 February 2010
- Home port: Lunenburg, Nova Scotia
- Identification: IMO number: 1001269; MMSI number: 314178000; Callsign: 8PRN
- Fate: Capsized and sank

General characteristics
- Tonnage: 413 GT; 123 NT; 495 DWT
- Length: 57.50 m (188 ft 8 in)
- Beam: 9.44 m (31 ft 0 in)
- Height: 35.00 m (114 ft 10 in)
- Draft: 4.00 m (13 ft 1 in)
- Depth of hold: 1 × MAN diesel engine (570 hp (430 kW))
- Sail plan: Barquentine; 993 m^{2} (10,690 sq ft) sail area
- Speed: 9 knots (17 km/h) (engine)
- Crew: 8 (min) – 66 (max)

Location where Concordia sank off Brazil.

Concordia was a steel-hulled barquentine that was built in Poland in 1992 for the West Island College, Montreal, Canada. She served as a sail training ship until she capsized and sank on 17 February 2010.

== Description ==
Concordia was built by Colod of Szczecin, Poland in 1991, and completed in April 1992. She was 57.50 metres (188 ft 8 in) long, with a beam of 9.44 metres (31 ft 0 in) and a draft of 4.00 metres (13 ft 1 in). She was 35.00 metres (114 ft 10 in) to the top of the highest mast. Her hull was made of steel, and she was rigged as a barquentine. As well as sails, she was propelled by a MAN diesel engine, which could propel her at 9 knots (17 km/h).

== History ==
Concordia was designed by Ryszard Langer and owned by the West Island College Class Afloat program. Her port of registry was Bridgetown, Barbados but she was based in Lunenburg, Nova Scotia. On 5 December 1996, an explosion on board during battery charging resulted in the death of a crew member, 18-year-old Derek Zavitz. Zavitz was thrown overboard and his remains were never found.

== Sinking ==
On 17 February 2010, SV Concordia encountered what the vessel's captain called a microburst some 550 kilometres (300 nmi) southeast of Rio de Janeiro, Brazil in rough seas and high winds. The vessel was knocked onto its side within 15 seconds and eventually sank 20 minutes afterward.

In September 2011, the Transportation Safety Board of Canada report found, "The wind speeds experienced by the vessel at the time of the knockdown were most likely in the range of 25 to 50 knots (46 to 93 km/h; 29 to 58 mph). While there was probably a vertical component to the wind, there is no evidence that a microburst occurred at the time of the knockdown." The report also found the vessel was operated in a way that did not allow it to, "...react to changing weather conditions appropriately and maintain the stability of the vessel."

"The risk of a knockdown was not understood," said TSB board member Jonathan Seymour. As a result, "appropriate action" – including reducing sail, changing course or sealing water-ingress points – was not taken before the squall hit.

— Globe and Mail, September 29, 2011

All aboard successfully abandoned ship. As the capsizing was so fast, no radio distress call was made but an EPIRB was hydrostatically released and automatically activated when the vessel sank.

The Concordia sank at 1423 hrs local time Wednesday. At 1425 Concordia's Bosun Geoffrey Byers swam to retrieve the EPIRB and brought it aboard the rafts. The Captain directed that someone hold the EPIRB upright at all times and keep it safe from damage. The EPIRB signal was received at 1505 hrs by the Geostationary Operational Environmental Satellite GOES 12. The position of the sinking, 27°28′S 40°53′W, was resolved at 1525 local time. The TSB report noted the EPIRB database only listed one telephone number for the Concordia and that number had not been in service since 2004.

The following morning at 0806 hrs the Maritime Rescue Coordination Centre Brazil sent a fax to Joint Rescue Coordination Centre Halifax requesting information about the Concordia. After attempting to contact Concordia a Brazilian Air Force aircraft was dispatched at 1700 hrs local time Thursday and sighted the liferafts 3 hours later.

The survivors spent nearly 30 hours in liferafts before the aircraft spotted them. Flares were fired from the rafts, and the aircraft blinked its landing lights in response and directed nearby merchant ships to the scene. The lights of the Mitsui O.S.K. Lines woodchip carriers Hokuetsu Delight and Crystal Pioneer were sighted by the survivors at 1:30 am local time and the rescue was completed by 8 am local time.

41 hours after the sinking the crew were safely aboard the rescue ships. All 64 people (48 students, eight teachers and eight crew) who were on board were rescued from 3 large and 1 small liferafts.
