= Andre Faust =

Canadian ice hockey player (born 1969)

- Born: October 7, 1969 (age 56) Joliette, Quebec, Canada
- Height: 6 ft 1 in (185 cm)
- Weight: 180 lb (82 kg; 12 st 12 lb)
- Position: Centre
- Shot: Left
- Played for: Philadelphia Flyers; Augsburger Panther; Kölner Haie; Färjestad BK; Odense Bulldogs
- NHL draft: 173rd overall, 1989; New Jersey Devils
- Playing career: 1992–2004

André A. Faust (born October 7, 1969) is a Canadian former professional ice hockey left winger. He played 47 games in the National Hockey League with the Philadelphia Flyers during the 1992–93 and 1993–94 seasons. The rest of his career, which lasted from 1992 to 2004, was mainly spent in Europe. He was drafted by New Jersey Devils in the 1989 NHL entry draft in 9th round as the 173rd pick overall. Faust is the first Princeton University alumnus to score a goal in the NHL.

== Playing career ==
During his career Faust played in NCAA, NHL, AHL, DEL, Swedish Elitserien and Danish Superisligaen. In the NHL he played 47 games for the Philadelphia Flyers during the 1992/93 and 1993/94 season. In the 1995/96 season, he played for the AHL club Springfield Falcons after he was traded to the Winnipeg Jets for a 7th-round pick in the 1997 NHL entry draft, he never played for Winnipeg. In 1996, Faust moved to Germany and played for Augsburger Panther (1996–2000) and Kölner Haie (2000–02). In 2002, he signed with Swedish club Färjestads BK. After that season Faust moved to a new club, Odense, and a new country, Denmark. Faust played there for one season and then he retired from ice hockey.

== Career statistics ==
=== Regular season and playoffs ===
			Regular season					Playoffs
Season	Team	League	GP	G	A	Pts	PIM	GP	G	A	Pts	PIM
1984–85	Anjou Majors	QMAAA	36	34	34	68	14	—	—	—	—	—
1985–86	Anjou Majors	QMAAA	39	39	41	80	26	—	—	—	—	—
1986–87	Upper Canada College	CISAA	32	40	38	78	20	—	—	—	—	—
1987–88	Upper Canada College	CISAA	45	66	59	125	30	—	—	—	—	—
1988–89	Princeton University	ECAC	26	18	16	34	34	—	—	—	—	—
1989–90	Princeton University	ECAC	27	15	29	44	28	—	—	—	—	—
1990–91	Princeton University	ECAC	26	15	22	37	51	—	—	—	—	—
1991–92	Princeton University	ECAC	27	14	21	35	38	—	—	—	—	—
1992–93	Philadelphia Flyers	NHL	10	2	2	4	4	—	—	—	—	—
1992–93	Hershey Bears	AHL	62	26	25	51	71	—	—	—	—	—
1993–94	Philadelphia Flyers	NHL	37	8	5	13	10	—	—	—	—	—
1993–94	Hershey Bears	AHL	13	6	7	13	10	10	4	3	7	26
1994–95	Hershey Bears	AHL	55	12	28	40	72	6	1	5	6	12
1995–96	Springfield Falcons	AHL	50	19	19	38	40	10	5	2	7	6
1996–97	Augsburger Panther	DEL	48	20	20	40	76	2	4	0	4	10
1997–98	Augsburger Panther	DEL	41	13	20	33	87	—	—	—	—	—
1998–99	Augsburger Panther	DEL	47	19	18	37	92	5	1	2	3	6
1999–00	Augsburger Panther	DEL	50	11	20	31	50	3	0	0	0	16
2000–01	Kölner Haie	DEL	52	12	21	33	32	3	0	1	1	0
2001–02	Kölner Haie	DEL	54	12	14	26	78	13	0	4	4	32
2002–03	Färjestads BK	SEL	39	4	3	7	28	4	0	0	0	0
2003–04	Odense Bulldogs	DEN	10	6	6	12	18	—	—	—	—	—
DEL totals			284	85	110	195	415	34	7	10	17	64
NHL totals			47	10	7	17	14	—	—	—	—	—

== Awards and honors ==
Award	Year
All-ECAC Hockey Rookie Team	1988–89
All-ECAC Hockey Second Team	1989–90
All-ECAC Hockey Second Team	1991–92

Awards and achievements
Preceded by Trent Andison	ECAC Hockey Rookie of the Year; 1988–89	Succeeded by Kent Manderville
