= Princeton Tigers men's ice hockey =

Men's ice hockey team

- Current season
- University: Princeton University
- Conference: ECAC Hockey
- First season: 1899–1900
- Head coach: Ben Syer; 2nd season, 12–15–3 (.450)
- Assistant coaches: Connor Jones; Shane Talarico; Dan Henningson
- Arena: Hobey Baker Memorial Rink; Princeton, New Jersey
- Colors: Black and orange

NCAA tournament appearances
- 1998, 2008, 2009, 2018

Conference tournament champions
- ECAC: 1998, 2008, 2018

Conference regular season champions
- IHA: 1907, 1910, 1912, 1913; IHL: 1914, 1917; Pentagonal League: 1941, 1953

The Princeton Tigers men's ice hockey team is a National Collegiate Athletic Association (NCAA) Division I college ice hockey program that represents Princeton University. The Tigers are a member of ECAC Hockey. They play at the Hobey Baker Memorial Rink in Princeton, New Jersey. In 1999, future NHL player Jeff Halpern scored 22 goals to tie for the most goals in the ECAC and was co-winner of Princeton's Roper Trophy for athletic and academic achievement. In 2010–11, Andrew Calof was ECAC Rookie of the Year.

== History ==
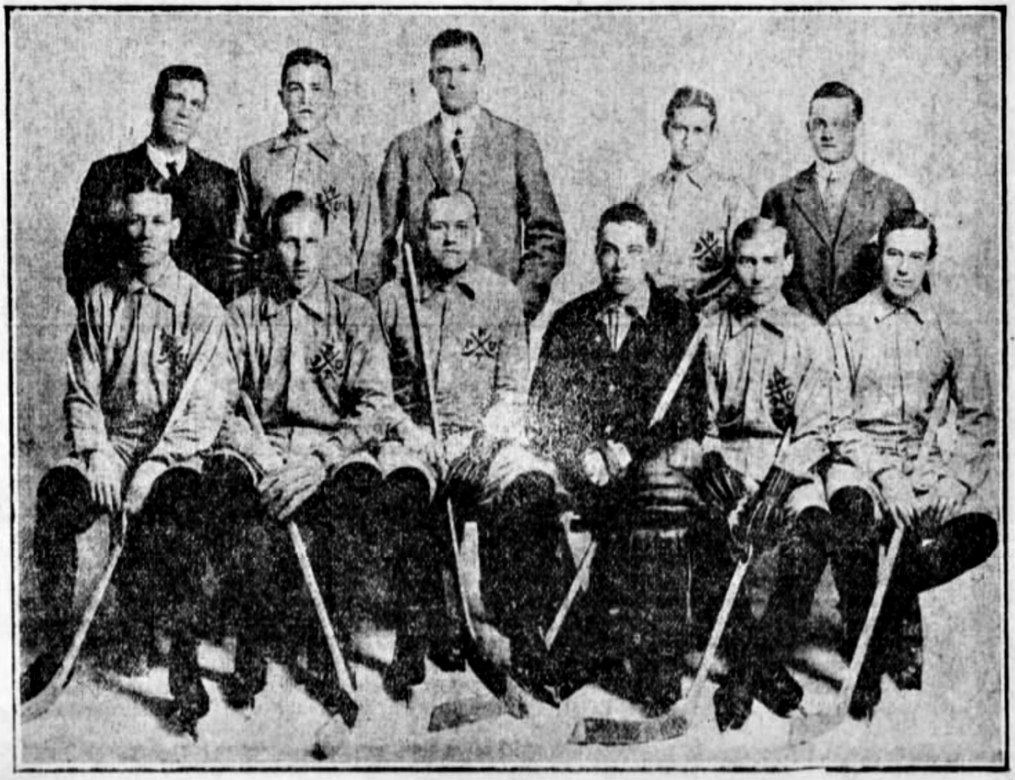
Princeton University ice hockey team in 1906–07 season. Players from top row to bottom row, left to right: Charles Coxe, Josh Brush, Chester Levis, Philip Chew, Jay Zahniser, John Chislett, Ralph Osborne and Harral Tenney.

Princeton University had an ice hockey team organized already during the 1894–95 season, when the school still went by the name of College of New Jersey. On March 3, 1895 the university ice hockey team faced a Baltimore aggregation at the North Avenue Ice Palace in Baltimore, Maryland and won by a score of 5–0. The players on the 1895 team were Chester Derr, John Brooks, Howard Colby, James Blair, Frederick Allen, Ralph Hoagland and Art Wheeler.

For the 1899–1900 season the Princeton University ice hockey team became a member of the Intercollegiate Hockey League (ICHL) where they played organized league games against other Ivy League school teams such as Brown, Columbia, Cornell, Dartmouth, Harvard, University of Pennsylvania and Yale.

Princeton's most famous ice hockey player Hobey Baker (1892–1918) played for the school team between 1911 and 1914, before he graduated and went on to play for the New York City based St. Nicholas Hockey Club.

As many college programs did, Princeton's ice hockey squad suspended operations for the 1917–18 season due to the United States entering World War I but the icers returned after the armistice was signed. A few years later the Tigers hired their first head coach, Russell O. Ellis, but they would go through several more before they could find someone to lead the program for more than a few years. Despite the tumult behind the bench Princeton was still producing some of the best teams in college hockey, setting a program record of 15 wins that would stand for 76 years.

In the midst of the Great Depression Richard Vaughan came to Princeton and would helm the team for the next quarter-century. Vaughan would keep the Tigers competitive through much of his tenure and his 159 wins remains a program high 60 years after his retirement. Princeton found it difficult to replace Vaughan, going through 5 coaches in 18 years while producing only two winning records in that time. The team's nadir came under Bill Quackenbush who, despite ending up in the Hall of Fame as a player, was the program's worst coach as far as records go. Quackenbush's tenure began well with Princeton making the ECAC tournament for the first time, but the following season the team slid to 16th in the conference and would not win more than 5 games a year for the next 5 seasons. Quackenbush remained with the program even after a 1–22 season but resigned in 1973 with the Tigers an afterthought in ECAC Hockey. Princeton would not play another postseason game until 1985, the year after 7 teams left to form Hockey East, and they would not win a playoff game until 1992 under first-year head coach Don Cahoon.

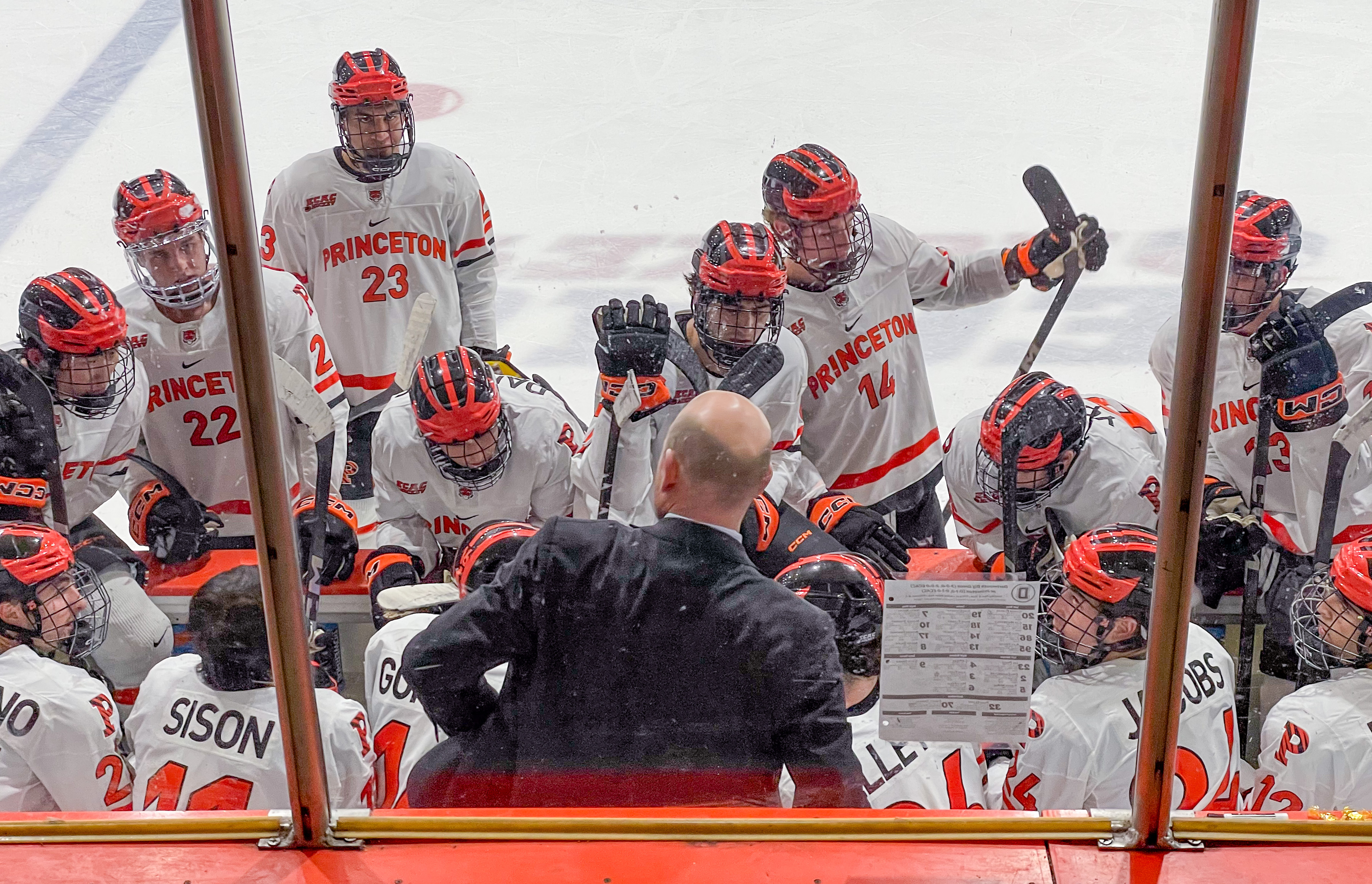
Coach Ben Syer and players in 2024

During Cahoon's time at Princeton the program recovered from decades as a bottom-feeder and in 1995 produced their first winning season in 27 years. Three seasons later the Tigers won their first conference tournament and made the NCAA tournament for the first time. After Cahoon left to head Massachusetts in 2000, he was replaced by long-time assistant Len Quesnelle but after four years the team was back at the bottom of the conference and he was swiftly replaced by Guy Gadowsky.

It took Gadowsky a few years to get the Tigers back on their feet but he led the team to its second conference championship in 2008, setting a program high with 21 wins that he bested by 1 the following year. Two years later Gadowsky left and was replaced by Bob Prier but just as had happened with Cahoon, the successor did not last long and after a dismal third season Ron Fogarty was hired as the 17th head coach in program history. As of 2019 Fogarty's best season came in 2018 when he led an underdog Tigers squad to their 3rd conference title.

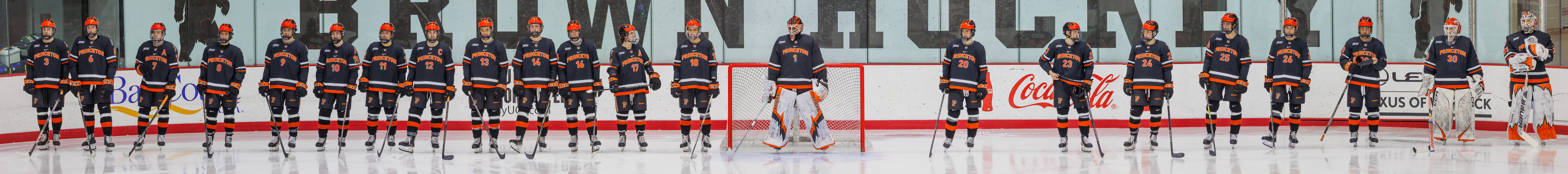
2023-2024 Princeton Tigers at Brown's Meehan Auditorium

== Records vs. current ECAC Hockey teams ==
As of the completion of 2018–19 season

School	Team	Away Arena	Overall record	Win %	Home	Away	Last Result
Brown University	Bears	Meehan Auditorium	72–90–11	.448	35–39–6	33–46–6	5-6 L (3OT)
Clarkson University	Golden Knights	Cheel Arena	34–84–7	.300	24–35–5	6–45–1	1-1 T
Colgate University	Raiders	Class of 1965 Arena	48–59–8	.452	28–26–6	15–32–2	3-4 L
Cornell University	Big Red	Lynah Rink	53–91–8	.375	25–39–6	16–50–2	2-3 L
Dartmouth College	Big Green	Thompson Arena	89–104–16	.464	45–44–8	34–46–8	0-5 L
Harvard University	Crimson	Bright-Landry Hockey Center	58–158–12	.281	27–60–5	18–75–6	4-2 W
Quinnipiac University	Bobcats	People's United Center	12–17–1	.417	4–10–1	8–7–0	3-6 L
Rensselaer Polytechnic Institute	Engineers	Houston Field House	37–69–11	.363	19–26–5	18–40–6	2-6 L
St. Lawrence University	Saints	Appleton Arena	25–70–11	.288	16–33–5	9–36–4	5-3 W
Union College	Dutchmen	Achilles Rink	25–36–7	.419	16–15–3	8–21–4	2-3 L
Yale University	Bulldogs	Ingalls Rink	109–141–11	.439	51–47–4	32–69–3	3-2 W

== All-time coaching records ==
Coaches

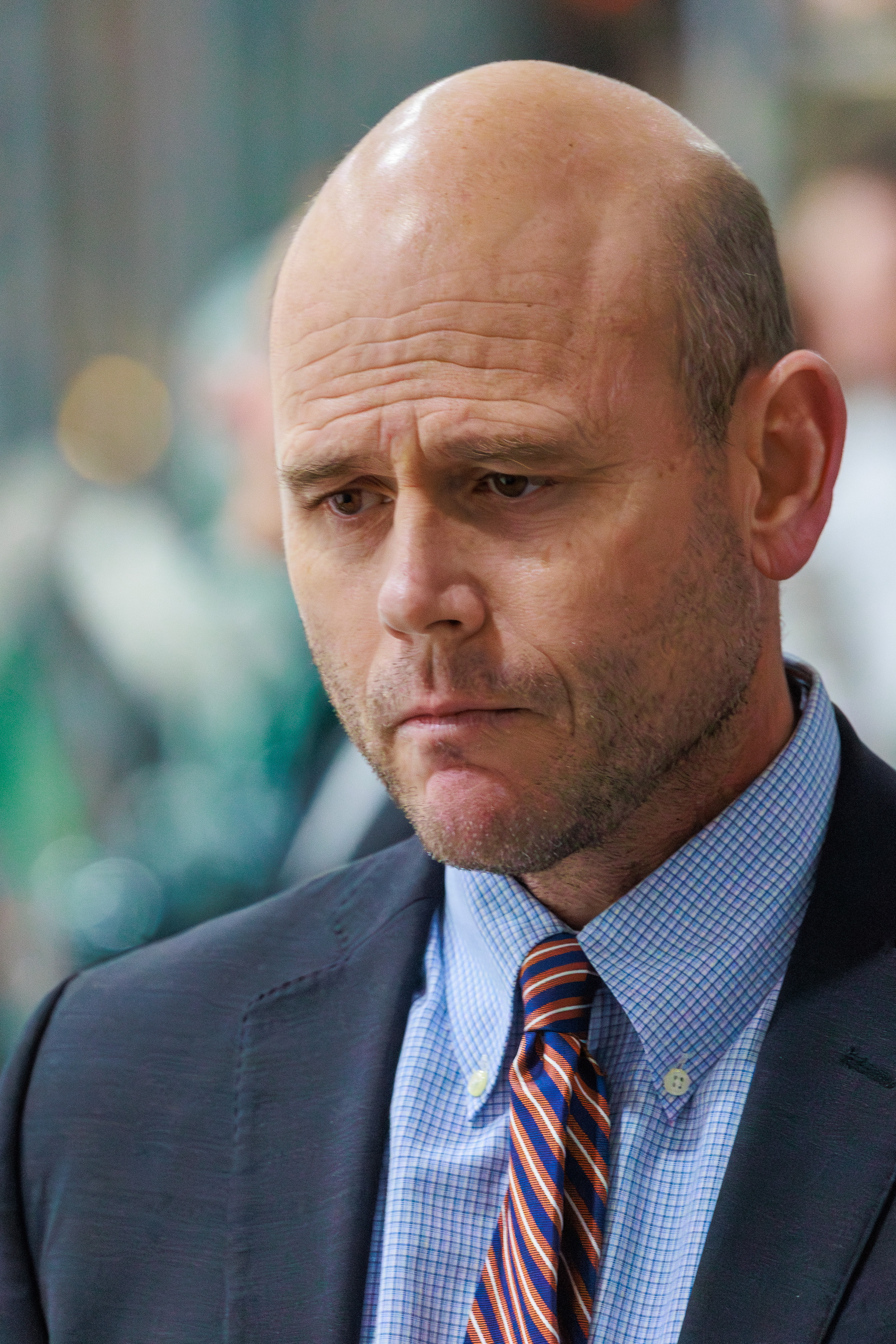
Head coach Ben Syer

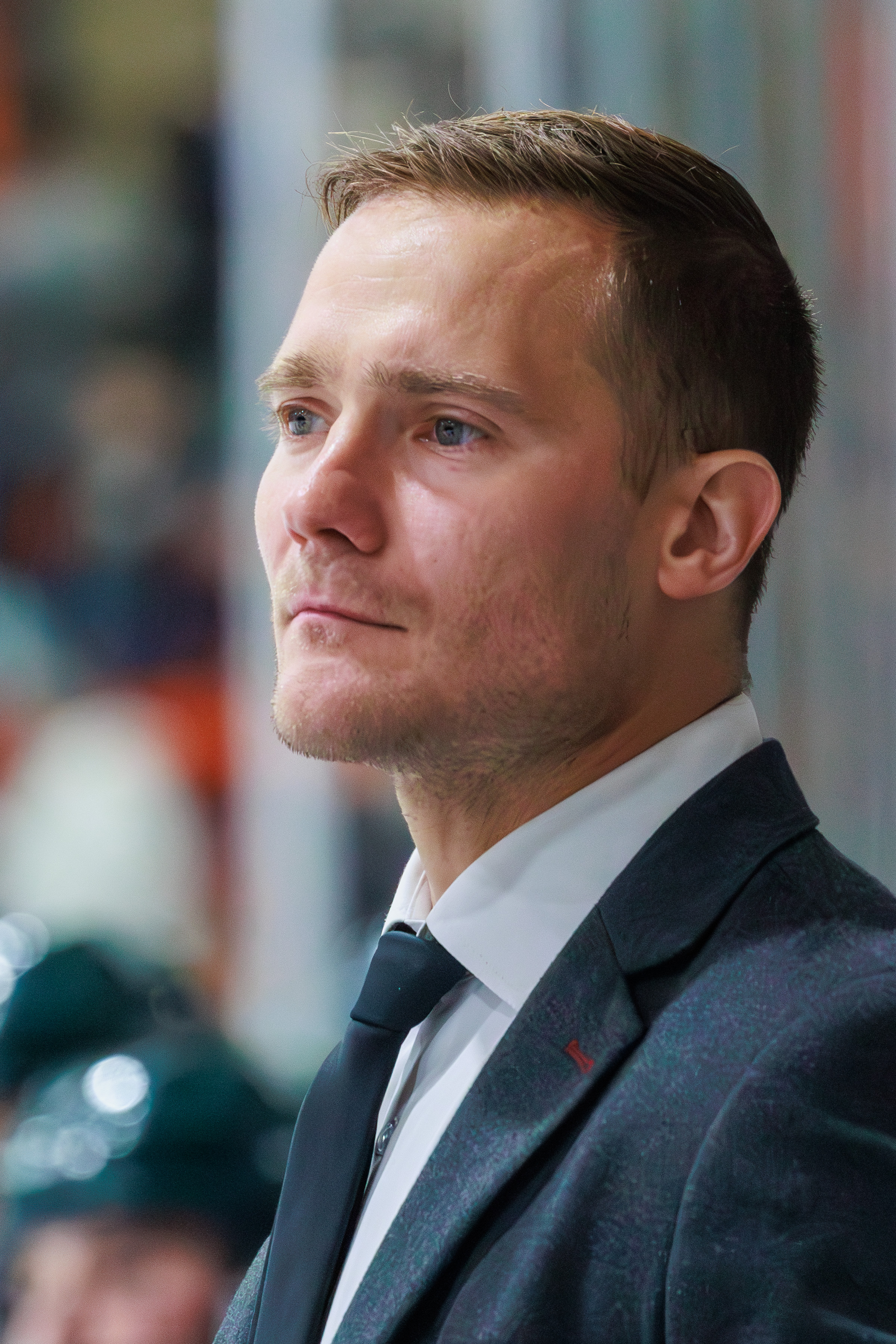
Assistant Connor Jones

As of completion of 2024–25 season

Tenure	Coach	Years	Record	Pct.
1899–1917, 1918–1920	No Coach	20	103–87–6	.541
1920–1921	Russell O. Ellis	1	4–4–0	.500
1921–1922	Moylan McDonnell	1	3–6–1	.350
1922–1924	Chippy Gaw	2	24–11–1	.681
1924–1927	Beattie Ramsay	3	20–25–1	.446
1927–1933	Lloyd Neidlinger	6	71–31–3	.690
1933–1935	Frank Fredrickson	2	15–18–0	.455
1935–1943, 1945–1959	Richard Vaughan	22	159–211–14	.432
1959–1965	R. Norman Wood	6	49–88–1	.359
1965–1967	Johnny Wilson	2	14–27–1	.345
1967–1973	Bill Quackenbush	6	34–104–2	.250
1973–1977	Jack Semler	4	25–66–5	.286
1977–1991	Jim Higgins	14	130–219–21	.380
1991–2000	Don Cahoon	9	122–129–32	.488
2000–2004	Len Quesnelle	4	29–84–11	.278
2004–2011	Guy Gadowsky	7	105–109–15	.491
2011–2014	Bob Prier	3	25–58–12	.326
2014–2024	Ron Fogarty	9	90–169–27	.362
2024–present	Ben Syer	1	12–15–3	.450
Totals	17 coaches	122 Seasons	1,034–1,461–156	.419

== Statistical leaders ==
The team's statistical leaders are as follows.

=== Career points leaders ===
Player	Years	GP	G	A	Pts	PIM
John Messuri	1985–1989	110	60	118	178	
Ryan Kuffner	2015–2019	132	75	77	152	
Andre Faust	1988–1992	106	62	88	150	
Max Véronneau	2015–2019	130	52	92	144	
Jeff Halpern	1995–1999	132	60	82	142	
John Cook	1960–1963		67	65	132	
Andrew Calof	2010–2014	117	44	79	123	
Greg Polaski	1986–1990	96	64	57	121	
Scott Bertoli	1995–1999	130	41	77	118	
John McBride	1957–1960		60	57	117	

=== Career goaltending leaders ===
GP = Games played; Min = Minutes played; W = Wins; L = Losses; T = Ties; GA = Goals against; SO = Shutouts; SV% = Save percentage; GAA = Goals against average

Minimum 30 games

Player	Years	GP	Min	W	L	T	GA	SO	SV%	GAA
Robert O'Connor	1947–1949	34								2.38
Zane Kalemba	2006–2010	108	6267	57	44	5	257	9	.912	2.46
Mike Condon	2009–2013	53	2969	18	22	8	288	3	.917	2.67
Sean Bonar	2010–2014	63	3457	17	33	6	182	2	.898	2.84
Erasmo Saltarelli	1994–1998	76	3975	29	24	11	196	5	.896	2.94

Statistics current through the start of the 2019–20 season.

== Roster ==
As of August 8, 2025.

No.	Nat.	Player	Class	Pos	Height	Weight	DoB	Hometown	Previous team	NHL rights
1	(United States)	Arthur Smith	Junior	G	6' 4" (1.93 m)	205 lb (93 kg)	2004-04-30	Farmington, Connecticut	Lone Star Brahmas (NAHL)	—
3	(United States)	Pat Reilly	Sophomore	D	6' 1" (1.85 m)	181 lb (82 kg)	2004-09-27	Avon, New Jersey	Coquitlam Express (BCHL)	—
4	(United States)	David Ma	Senior (RS)	D	5' 11" (1.8 m)	180 lb (82 kg)	2002-06-22	Yonkers, New York	Chicago Steel (USHL)	—
6	(Canada)	Ian Devlin	Junior	D	6' 2" (1.88 m)	210 lb (95 kg)	2002-01-07	Toronto, Ontario	Coquitlam Express (BCHL)	—
7	(Canada)	Kai Daniells	Junior	F	6' 0" (1.83 m)	185 lb (84 kg)	2003-03-07	Whistler, British Columbia	Nanaimo Clippers (BCHL)	—
8	(United States)	Tyler Rubin	Senior	D	5' 10" (1.78 m)	175 lb (79 kg)	2003-01-10	Natick, Massachusetts	West Kelowna Warriors (BCHL)	—
9	(Norway)	Hans Ulvbene	Freshman	F	6' 0" (1.83 m)	194 lb (88 kg)	2004-08-25	Oslo, Norway	Cedar Rapids RoughRiders (USHL)	—
11	(United States)	Jayden Sison	Senior	F	5' 9" (1.75 m)	185 lb (84 kg)	2003-01-27	Paoli, Pennsylvania	Coquitlam Express (BCHL)	—
12	(United States)	Jake Manfre	Sophomore	F	6' 0" (1.83 m)	201 lb (91 kg)	2004-04-22	Smithtown, New York	Coquitlam Express (BCHL)	—
13	(United States)	Drew Garzone	Sophomore	F	6' 1" (1.85 m)	190 lb (86 kg)	2004-05-30	Dover, Massachusetts	Coquitlam Express (BCHL)	—
14	(Canada)	Carson Buydens	Junior	F	6' 3" (1.91 m)	185 lb (84 kg)	2004-03-10	Gladstone, Manitoba	North Iowa Bulls (BCHL)	—
15	(Canada)	Julian Facchinelli	Sophomore	F	6' 0" (1.83 m)	181 lb (82 kg)	2004-07-04	Woodbridge, Ontario	Vernon Vipers (BCHL)	—
16	(United States)	Brendan Gorman	Senior	F	6' 0" (1.83 m)	175 lb (79 kg)	2003-02-17	Arlington, Massachusetts	Saint Sebastian's School (USHS–MA)	—
17	(United States)	Miles Gunty	Sophomore	F	5' 10" (1.78 m)	190 lb (86 kg)	2004-02-21	Bethesda, Maryland	Youngstown Phantoms (USHL)	—
18	(United States)	Joshua Karnish	Junior	F	5' 11" (1.8 m)	175 lb (79 kg)	2003-08-07	Marlton, New Jersey	Cedar Rapids RoughRiders (USHL)	—
19	(United States)	Seamus Latta	Freshman	F	6' 0" (1.83 m)	201 lb (91 kg)	2005-04-08	Bozeman, Montana	Victoria Grizzlies (BCHL)	—
20	(Canada)	Kevin Anderson	Senior	F	5' 11" (1.8 m)	175 lb (79 kg)	2003-09-15	Regina, Saskatchewan	Notre Dame Hounds (SJHL)	—
21	(United States)	Michael Young	Junior	F	5' 11" (1.8 m)	185 lb (84 kg)	2002-08-28	Kings Park, New York	New Jersey Titans (NAHL)	—
22	(Canada)	Matt Souliere	Freshman	F	6' 3" (1.91 m)	190 lb (86 kg)	206-08-01	London, Ontario	Ottawa 67's (OHL)	—
23	(Canada)	Kai Greaves	Sophomore	D	6' 2" (1.88 m)	205 lb (93 kg)	2003-03-04	Cambridge, Ontario	Prince George Spruce Kings (BCHL)	—
24	(United States)	David Jacobs	Senior	F	5' 10" (1.78 m)	180 lb (82 kg)	2001-09-26	Needham, Massachusetts	Cowichan Valley Capitals (BCHL)	—
25	(United States)	Nick Marciano	Senior	D	6' 1" (1.85 m)	205 lb (93 kg)	2002-05-19	Greenwich, Connecticut	Prince George Spruce Kings (BCHL)	—
26	(Canada)	Luc Pelletier	Sophomore	F	6' 4" (1.93 m)	205 lb (93 kg)	2003-09-07	Courtenay, British Columbia	Victoria Grizzlies (BCHL)	—
27	(United States)	Jaxson Ezman	Senior	F	6' 1" (1.85 m)	185 lb (84 kg)	2002-12-22	Middleton, Wisconsin	Dubuque Fighting Saints (USHL)	—
28	(Canada)	Brendan Wang	Senior	D	5' 11" (1.8 m)	180 lb (82 kg)	2002-02-08	Burnaby, British Columbia	Fort McMurray Oil Barons (AJHL)	—
30	(United States)	Conor Callaghan	Junior	G	6' 0" (1.83 m)	185 lb (84 kg)	2003-03-02	Ho-Ho-Kus, New Jersey	Muskegon Lumberjacks (USHL)	—
33	(United States)	Chris Reiniger	Freshman	D	5' 8" (1.73 m)	170 lb (77 kg)	2006-03-27	Annapolis, Maryland	Chicago Steel (USHL)	—
35	(United States)	Dan Moor	Freshman	G	6' 2" (1.88 m)	190 lb (86 kg)	2006-01-17	Omaha, Nebraska	Omaha Lancers (USHL)	—

== Awards and honors ==
=== Hockey Hall of Fame ===
- Hobey Baker (1945)

=== US Hockey Hall of Fame ===
- Hobey Baker (1973)

=== NCAA ===
==== All-Americans ====
AHCA First Team All-Americans

- 1952-53: Hank Bothfeld, F
- 1985-86: Cliff Abrecht, D
- 2007-08: Mike Moore, D; Lee Jubinville, F
- 2018-19: Ryan Kuffner, F

AHCA Second Team All-Americans

- 1997-98: Steve Shirreffs, D
- 2008-09: Zane Kalemba, G
- 2010-11: Taylor Fedun, D
- 2017-18: Ryan Kuffner, F; Max Véronneau, F

=== ECAC Hockey ===
==== Individual awards ====
Player of the Year

- Lee Jubinville: 2008
- Zane Kalemba: 2009

Rookie of the Year

- John Messuri: 1986
- Andre Faust: 1989
- Andrew Calof: 2011

Best Defensive Defenseman

- Mike Moore: 2008
- Danny Biega: 2012

Best Defensive Forward

- Ian Sharp: 1994, 1995
- Syl Apps III: 1999

Ken Dryden Award

- Zane Kalemba: 2009

Student-Athlete of the Year

- Landis Stankievech: 2008

Tim Taylor Award

- Guy Gadowsky: 2008

Most Outstanding Player in tournament

- Jeff Halpern: 1998
- Zane Kalemba: 2008
- Ryan Ferland: 2018

==== All-Conference ====
First Team All-ECAC Hockey

- 1985–86: Cliff Abrecht, D
- 1987–88: John Messuri, F
- 1997–98: Steve Shirreffs, F
- 2004–05: Luc Paquin, D
- 2007–08: Mike Moore, D; Lee Jubinville, F
- 2008–09: Zane Kalemba, G
- 2010–11: Taylor Fedun, D
- 2017–18: Max Véronneau, F
- 2018–19: Ryan Kuffner, F

Second Team All-ECAC Hockey

- 1961–62: John Cook, F
- 1962–63: John Cook, F
- 1967–68: Thomas Rawls, D
- 1986–87: John Messuri, F
- 1989–90: Mike McKee, D; Andre Faust, F; Greg Polaski, F
- 1991–92: Andre Faust, F
- 1993–94: Sean O'Brien, D
- 1997–98: Jeff Halpern, F
- 1998–99: Steve Shirreffs, D; Jeff Halpern, F
- 1999–2000: Kirk Lamb, F
- 2004–05: Dustin Sproat, F
- 2007–08: Brett Wilson, F
- 2009–10: Taylor Fedun, D
- 2011–12: Michael Sdao, D
- 2012–13: Andrew Calof, F
- 2016–17: Max Véronneau, F
- 2017–18: Ryan Kuffner, F
- 2018–19: Max Véronneau, F

Third Team All-ECAC Hockey

- 2005–06: Eric Leroux, G; Grant Goeckner-Zoeller, F
- 2008–09: Jody Peterson, D
- 2010–11: Andrew Calof, F
- 2017–18: Josh Teves, D
- 2018–19: Josh Teves, D

ECAC Hockey All-Rookie Team

- 1987–88: Mark Salsbury, G; Andy Cesarski, D
- 1988–89: Mike McKee, D; Andre Faust, F
- 1990–91: Rob Laferriere, F
- 1992–93: Jason Smith, D
- 1994–95: Casson Masters, D
- 1996–97: Dominique Auger, D
- 2005–06: Brett Wilson, F
- 2010–11: Andrew Calof, F
- 2015–16: Ryan Kuffner, F
- 2016–17: Jackson Cressey, F

== Olympians ==
This is a list of Princeton alumni who have played on an Olympic team.

Name	Position	Princeton Tenure	Team	Year	Finish
Gerard Hallock	Defenseman	1923–1926	(United States) USA	1932	Silver
Robert Livingston	Defenseman	1928–1931	(United States) USA	1932	Silver
Fred Kammer	Right Wing	1931–1934	(United States) USA	1936	Bronze
Malcolm McAlpin	Center	1930–1932	(United States) USA	1936	Bronze
Christopher Rodgers	Goaltender	1941–1942	(United States) USA†	1948	DQ
Jim Sloane	Right Wing	1940–1943	(United States) USA†	1948	DQ

† denotes the AAU team that marched in the opening ceremony but did not participate.

== Tigers in the NHL ==
As of July 1, 2025.

= NHL All-Star team	= NHL All-Star	= NHL All-Star and NHL All-Star team	= Hall of Famers

Player	Position	Team(s)	Years	Games	Stanley Cups
Syl Apps Jr.	Center	NYR, PIT, LAK	1970–1980	727	0
Mike Condon	Goaltender	MTL, PIT, OTT	2015–2019	129	0
Chris Corrinet	Wing	WSH	2001–2002	8	0
Andre Faust	Left Wing	PHI	1992–1994	47	0
Taylor Fedun	Defenseman	EDM, SJS, VAN, BUF, DAL, PIT	2013–2023	131	0
Jeff Halpern	Center	WSH, DAL, TBL, LAK, MTL, NYR, PHO	1999–2014	976	1^{†}
Ryan Kuffner	Left Wing	DET	2018–2019	10	0
Ed Lee	Wing	QUE	1984–1985	2	0

Player	Position	Team(s)	Years	Games	Stanley Cups
Mike McKee	Defenseman	QUE	1993–1994	48	0
Mike Moore	Defenseman	SJS	2010–2011	6	0
George Parros	Right Wing	LAK, COL, ANA, FLA, MTL	2005–2014	474	1
Darroll Powe	Center	PHI, MIN, NYR	2008–2014	329	0
Eric Robinson	Left Wing	CBJ, BUF, CAR	2017–Present	388	0
Josh Teves	Defenseman	VAN	2018–2019	1	0
Max Véronneau	Right Wing	OTT	2018–2020	16	0
Kevin Westgarth	Right Wing	LAK, CAR, CGY	2008–2014	169	1

† Jeff Halpern won a Stanley Cup as an assistant coach with the Tampa Bay Lightning in 2020.

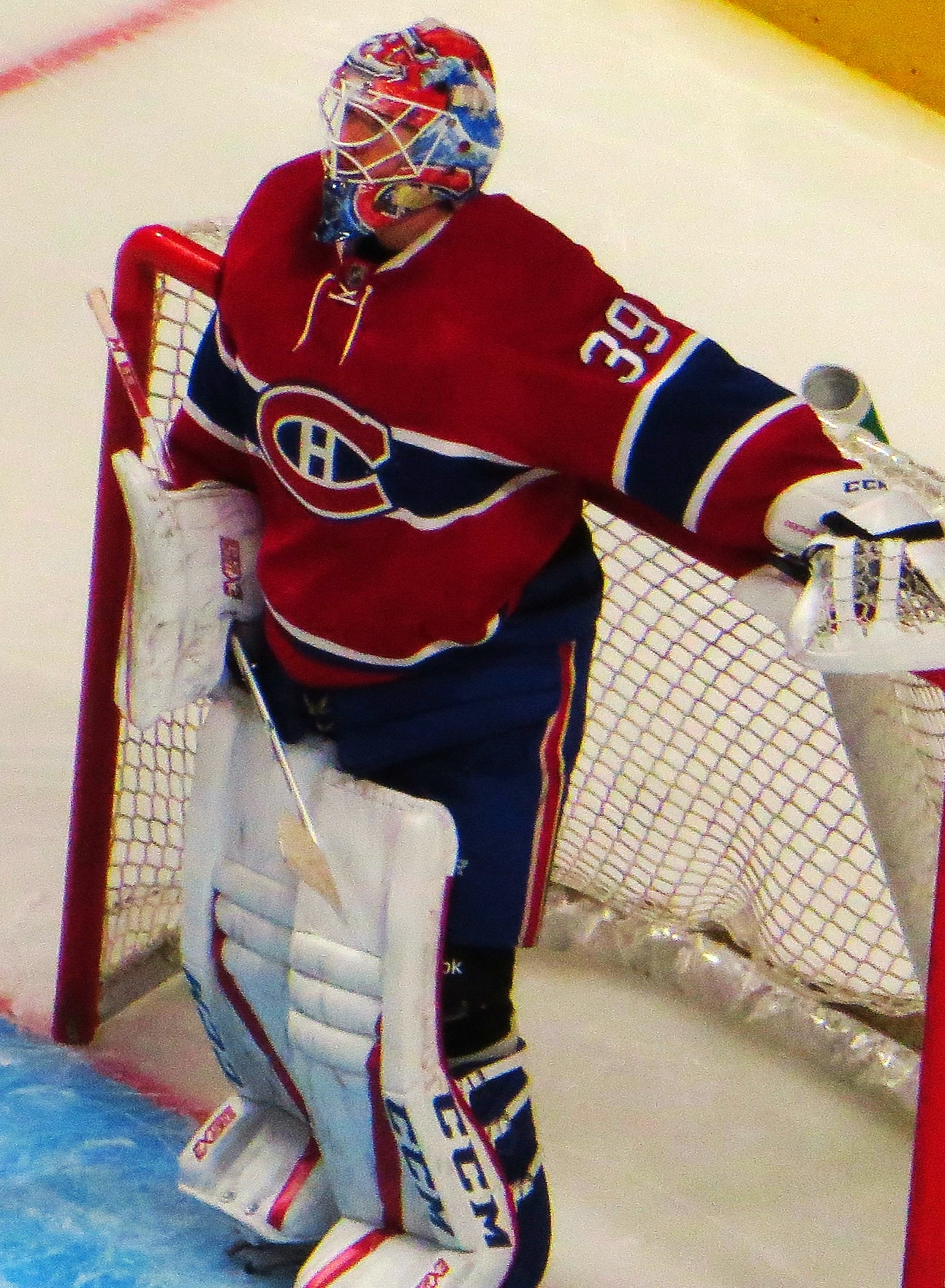
Mike Condon

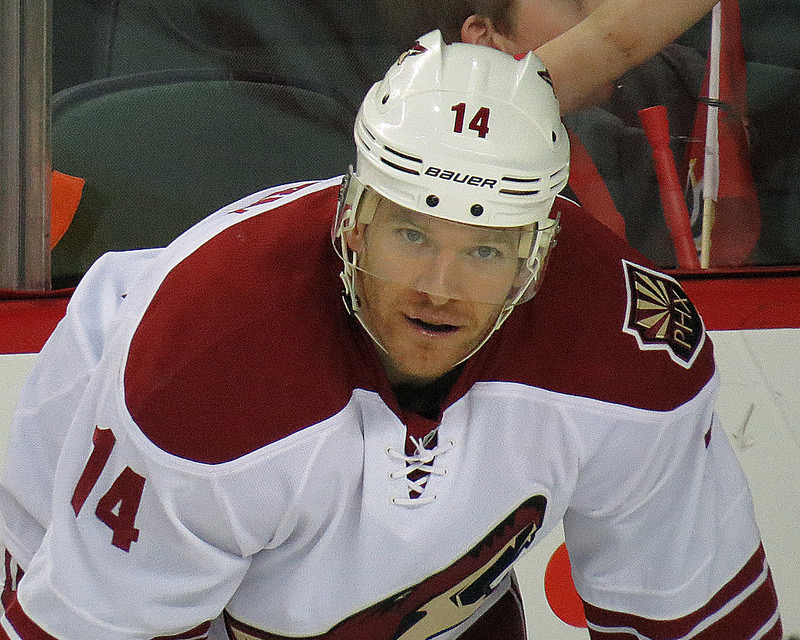
Jeff Halpern

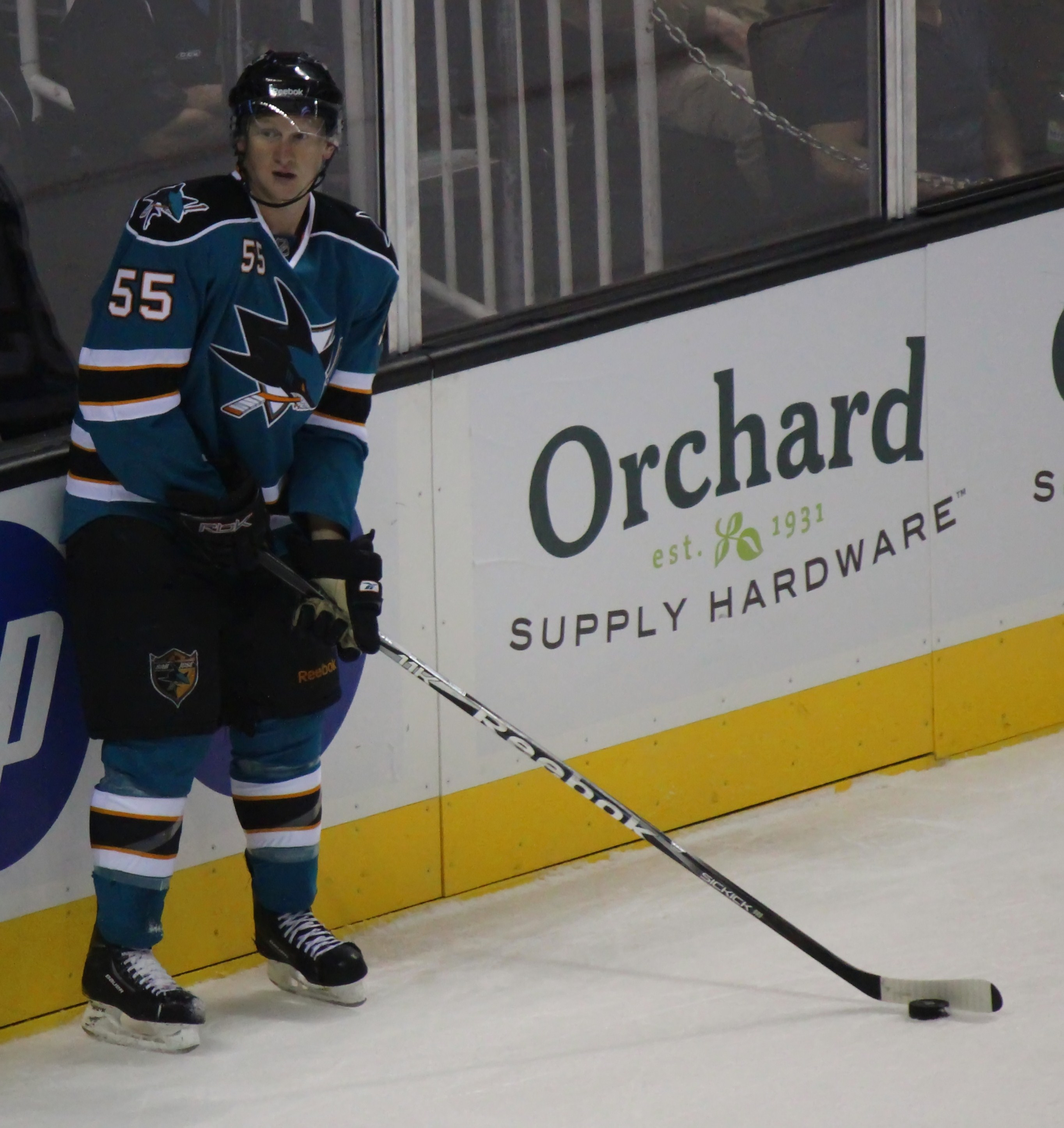
Mike Moore

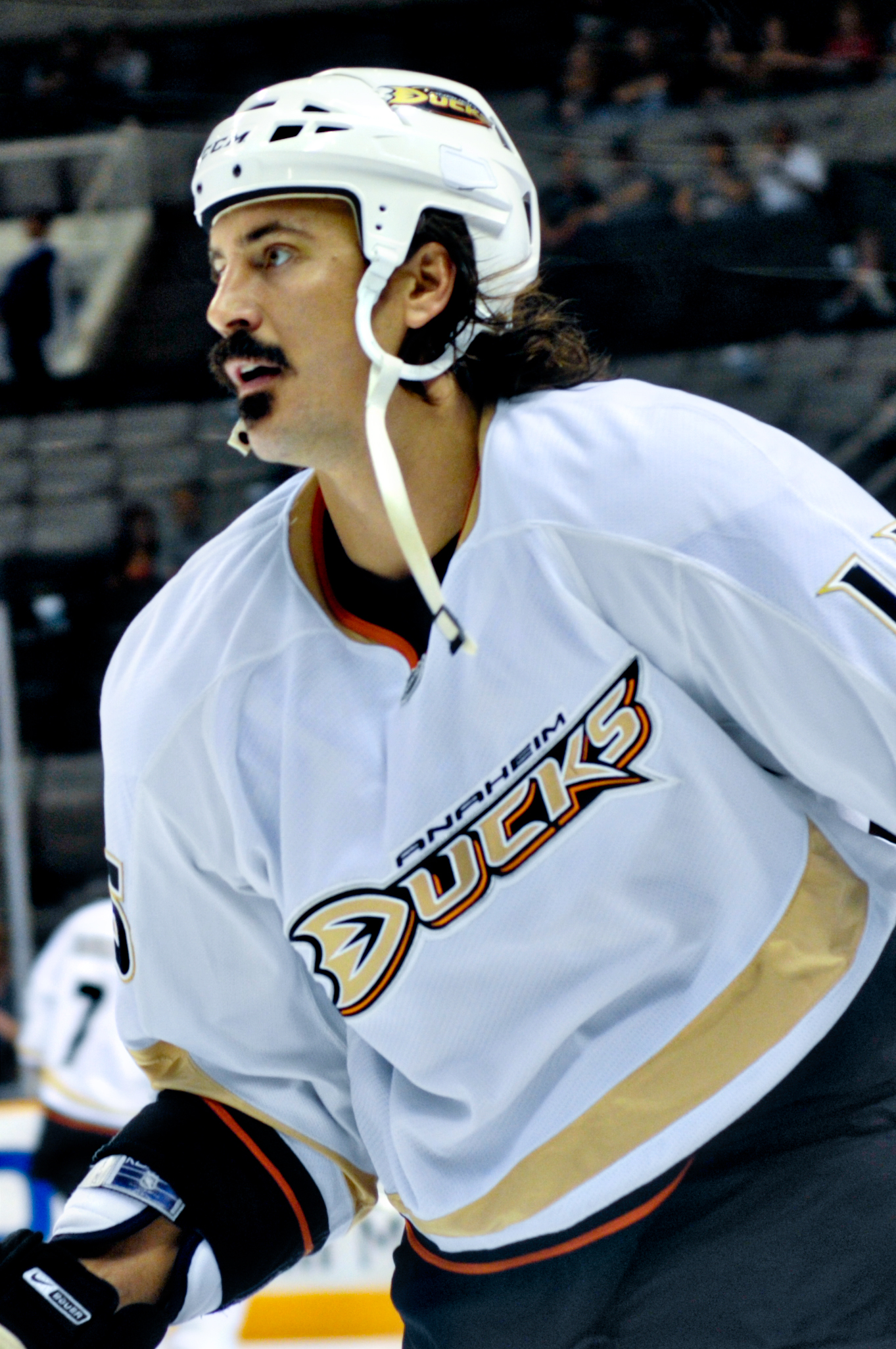
George Parros

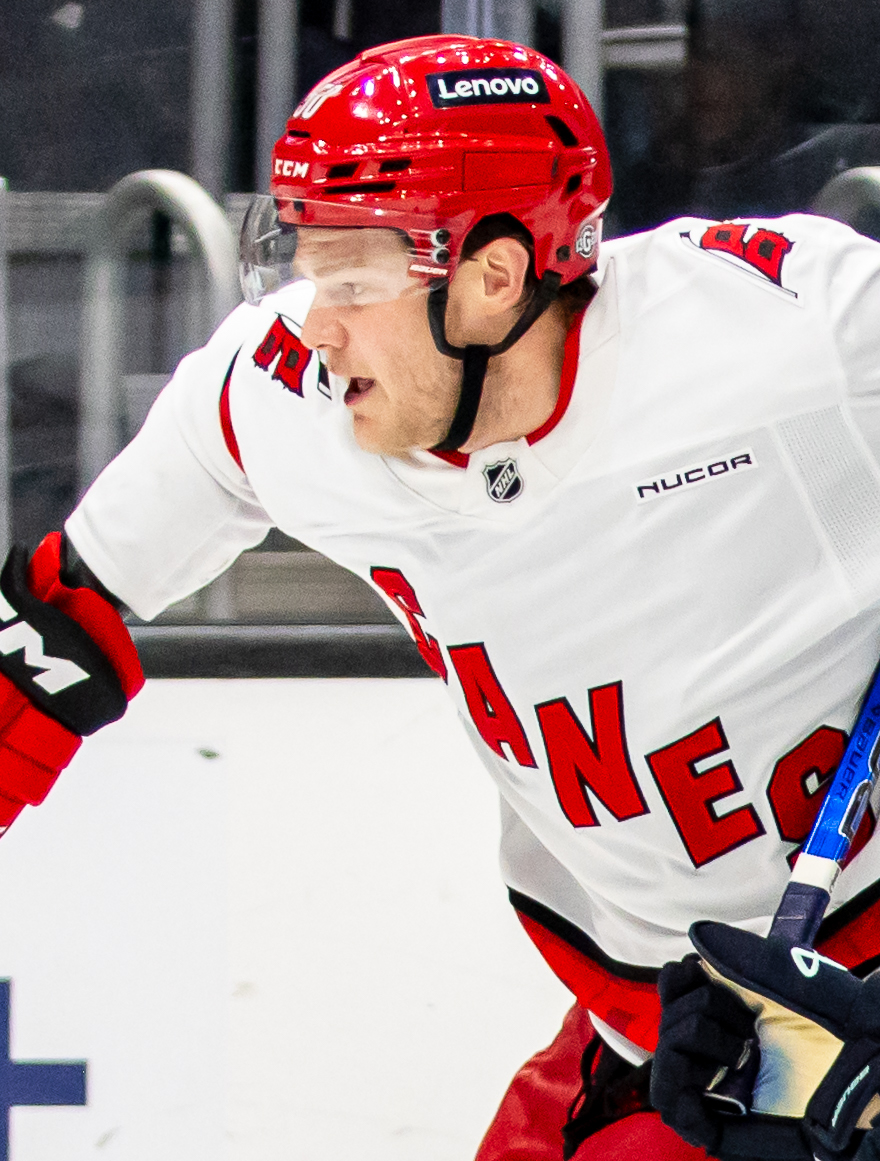
Eric Robinson

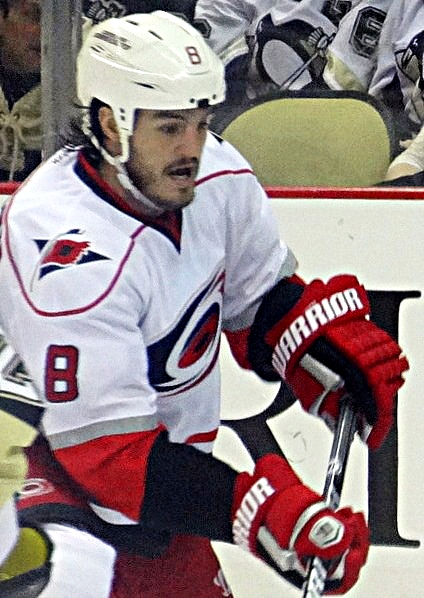
Kevin Westgarth

== See also ==
- Princeton Tigers women's ice hockey
- Princeton Tigers
- Hobey Baker Award
