= Josh Teves =

Canadian ice hockey player (born 1995)

- Born: February 18, 1995 (age 30) Calgary, Alberta, Canada
- Height: 6 ft 0 in (183 cm)
- Weight: 190 lb (86 kg; 13 st 8 lb)
- Position: Defence
- Shoots: Left
- NL team Former teams: SC Bern; Vancouver Canucks; JYP Jyväskylä
- NHL draft: Undrafted
- Playing career: 2019–present

Joshua Michael Brain Teves (born February 18, 1995) is a Canadian professional ice hockey defenceman currently playing with SC Bern in the Swiss National League (NL). He previously played for the Vancouver Canucks in the National Hockey League (NHL).

== Playing career ==
=== Amateur ===
From 2011 to 2013, Teves played minor hockey for the Calgary Royals. After graduating from West Island College, Teves played for the Fernie Ghostriders in the Kootenay International Junior Hockey League (KIJHL) during the 2013–14 season and committed to play NCAA Division I ice hockey at Princeton University for the Tigers men's ice hockey team. He then joined the Merritt Centennials in the British Columbia Hockey League (BCHL) for the 2014–15 season, where he was awarded the Coach's Choice award and the Most Improved award. Teves also became the first Centennial player to be awarded the RBC National Junior A Scholarship.

For the 2015–16 season, Teves joined the Princeton Tigers. In his freshman season, he played 31 games and recorded 7 points. His offence picked up the following season, where he led Tiger defencemen in scoring with 25 points. However, after advancing to the 2017 ECAC Hockey Men's Ice Hockey Tournament Quarterfinals, Princeton lost to Union College. At the end of the season, Teves was selected for the first-team All-Ivy League and was invited to the Calgary Flames' 2017 Development Camp.

Teves returned to Princeton for his junior year, where he led all defencemen in scoring with 33 points. Princeton once again qualified for the ECAC Tournament, where they defeated Clarkson University in a 2–1 overtime win to clinch an NCAA Division I Men's Ice Hockey Tournament spot for the first time since 2009. Teves was named to the All-ECAC Hockey third-team, becoming the first Tigers defenceman since 2012 to win the honour, and again selected as a first-team All-Ivy League. However, the Tigers lost 4–2 against the Ohio State University in the first round.

In his senior year, Teves was named to the ECAC Hockey Pre-Season All-League Team and selected as team captain. That season, Teves led the team's defencemen in scoring as Princeton qualified for the 2019 ECAC Hockey Men's Ice Hockey Tournament. He was also nominated for the Hockey Humanitarian Award for his community service work and named a finalist for the 2018–19 Senior CLASS Award. However, Princeton was swept by Brown University in the first round, effectively ending Teves' collegiate career. On March 18, 2019, Teves was again selected for the All-ECAC Hockey third-team.

=== Professional ===
On March 12, 2019, as an undrafted NHL free agent, Teves signed a one-year contract with the Vancouver Canucks. He made his NHL debut on March 26 in Vancouver's 5–4 loss to the Anaheim Ducks.

After his entry-level contract with the Canucks, having played in just one game in his tenure with the club, Teves was not tendered a qualifying offer and was released to free agency. On August 6, 2021, Teves was signed to a one-year AHL contract with the Rochester Americans, affiliate to the Buffalo Sabres.

As a free agent from the Sabres, having not featured with the club, Teves opted to sign abroad in agreeing to a one-year contract with Finnish club, JYP Jyväskylä of the Liiga, on August 31, 2022.

== Personal life ==
Teves was born to Armando Teves, a teacher, and Phillippa Brain-Teves, a surgeon, on February 18, 1995; he has two siblings. Teves attended school in Calgary at West Island College.

== Career statistics ==
			Regular season					Playoffs
Season	Team	League	GP	G	A	Pts	PIM	GP	G	A	Pts	PIM
2012–13	Calgary Royals	AMHL	5	0	0	0	2	4	0	0	0	0
2013–14	Fernie Ghostriders	KIJHL	50	10	14	24	57	5	2	1	3	2
2013–14	Merritt Centennials	BCHL	—	—	—	—	—	2	0	0	0	0
2014–15	Merritt Centennials	BCHL	57	5	28	33	39	4	0	2	2	0
2015–16	Princeton University	ECAC	31	2	5	7	12	—	—	—	—	—
2016–17	Princeton University	ECAC	34	4	21	25	10	—	—	—	—	—
2017–18	Princeton University	ECAC	31	7	26	33	21	—	—	—	—	—
2018–19	Princeton University	ECAC	30	3	17	20	20	—	—	—	—	—
2018–19	Vancouver Canucks	NHL	1	0	0	0	2	—	—	—	—	—
2019–20	Utica Comets	AHL	29	0	2	2	21	—	—	—	—	—
2019–20	Kalamazoo Wings	ECHL	4	2	2	4	2	—	—	—	—	—
2020–21	Utica Comets	AHL	23	1	3	4	13	—	—	—	—	—
2021–22	Rochester Americans	AHL	72	6	15	21	44	7	0	2	2	2
2022–23	JYP Jyväskylä	Liiga	48	3	7	10	20	—	—	—	—	—
NHL totals			1	0	0	0	2	—	—	—	—	—

== Awards and honours ==
Award	Year
College
First-Team All-Ivy League	2017, 2018
All-ECAC Third Team	2018, 2019
