= Hank Bothfeld =

American ice hockey player

- Born: October 4, 1930 (age 96) Wellesley, Massachusetts, USA
- Position: Center
- Played for: Princeton
- National team: United States
- Playing career: 1950–1955

Henry Edmund Bothfeld is an American retired ice hockey center who played for Princeton in the 1950s.

== Career ==
Bothfeld was captain of both the soccer and ice hockey teams in his senior season at Phillips Exeter Academy. After graduating he began attending Princeton University in the fall of 1949 and led the freshman team to an undefeated season with 28 goals, more than a quarter of the team's total on the year. Once he made the varsity squad in 1950 he was again the leading scorer, scoring 23 goals (a program record for 6-on-6 hockey). In his sophomore season Bothfeld helped Princeton to their first winning record in almost a decade, after which he was named team captain. In his final season the Tigers finished with an 11–7 record, a mark they would not surpass for 46 years. Bothfeld led Princeton with 39 points, finishing his career with 55 goals and 48 assists in just 52 games. As of 2020 he sits 15th in program history in points and 9th in goals, however, he is second in points per game and first in goals per game since 1948. Bothfeld was named as the first AHCA First Team All-American for Princeton in 1953.

After his college career Bothfeld was invited to play for the US national team at the 1955 Ice Hockey World Championships, but played in only one game and the team finished in 4th-place. He was in consideration for the team at the 1956 Winter Olympics but did not make the squad.

== Statistics ==
=== Regular season and playoffs ===
			Regular season					Playoffs
Season	Team	League	GP	G	A	Pts	PIM	GP	G	A	Pts	PIM
1950–51	Princeton	NCAA	—	23	—	—	—	—	—	—	—	—
1951–52	Princeton	NCAA	—	—	—	—	—	—	—	—	—	—
1952–53	Princeton	MCHL	—	—	—	39	—	—	—	—	—	—
NCAA totals			52	55	48	103	6	—	—	—	—	—

=== International ===
Year	Team	GP	G	A	Pts	PIM
1955	United States	1	0	1	1	0

== Awards and honors ==
Award	Year
AHCA First Team All-American	1952–53
