= John Messuri =

American ice hockey player (born 1966)

- Born: August 22, 1966 (age 59) Arlington, Massachusetts, U.S.
- Height: 5 ft 7 in (170 cm)
- Weight: 175 lb (79 kg; 12 st 7 lb)
- Position: Right wing
- Shot: Left
- Played for: Johnstown Chiefs; Flint Bulldogs; Maine Mariners
- NHL draft: Undrafted
- Playing career: 1989–1993

John Messuri (born August 22, 1966) is an American former professional ice hockey forward. Messuri is currently head coach of the Arlington High School Spy Ponders in Massachusetts.

== College ==
Messuri played his college hockey at Princeton University, where he was the leading scorer in each of his four seasons and currently is the Princeton Tigers' all-time leading scorer.

== Professional ==
Messuri spent his first two seasons with the Johnstown Chiefs of the East Coast Hockey League, where he led the team in points in both the 1989-90 season (72 points) and the 1990-91 season (90 points). He also had a brief recall with the Chiefs' AHL affiliate, the Maine Mariners. Despite only playing two seasons and only 116 games with the Chiefs, Messuri's 162 points is the tenth-highest total in Chiefs' history.

Messuri later signed with the Flint Bulldogs of the Colonial Hockey League, where he played on a team with former teammates Quintin Brickley, Lee Odelein, E.J. Sauer, Jason Simon and former Chiefs forward Tom Sasso, who had played in Johnstown the prior to Messuri's arrival. He played two seasons for the Bulldogs, scoring 57 points in 51 games, and retired after the 1992-93 season.

== Coaching ==
Messuri was hired on as the coach of the Winchester Sachems at the start of the 1994-95 season. At the time of Messuri's hiring, the Winchester team had only two games in a season once since 1975 and was in the middle of a 100-game inter-league losing streak. Although Winchester only won six games in his first year as coach, his team qualified for the state tournament in 1996-97. Messuri's teams would win the Massachusetts Division 1 State Championship during the 1997–98 and 1999-2000 seasons. After 15 years of coaching, Messuri retired after the 2009-10. His replacement was Matt Spang, a player that Messuri had previously coached. He now coaches at the Arlington High School where he played in high school and the team went 5-10-5 in his first season, 9-7-5 in his second year, 14-4-5, and then 16-3-4 last season. He has qualified for the Massachusetts High School Division 1 Tournament the past 3 seasons, and qualified for a Super 8 tournament play-in game in 2016. Messuri would later go on to win two Division 1A state championships in 2017 and 2020, leading just the third public high school to do so.

Along with his brothers Mike, Dave and Tony, John runs the Messuri Skating And Skills Hockey Camp.

== Awards and honors ==
Award	Year
All-ECAC Hockey Second Team	1986–87
All-ECAC Hockey First Team	1987–88

- 1985-86, ECAC/IVY, Rookie of the Year
- 1988-89, ECAC/IVY, Player of the Year
- 1985-89, Hobey Baker Finalist
- 1985-86, Leading scorer (tie), Princeton Tigers
- 1986-87, Leading scorer, Princeton Tigers
- 1987-88, Leading scorer, Princeton Tigers
- 1988-89, Leading scorer, Princeton Tigers
- 1989-90, Leading scorer, Johnstown Chiefs
- 1990-91, Leading scorer, Johnstown Chiefs
- 1997-98, Division 1 Coach of the Year
- 1997-98, Division 1 State Champion (Coach)
- 1999-00, Division 1 Coach of the Year
- 1999-00, Division 1 State Champion (Coach)

Awards and achievements
Preceded by Joe Nieuwendyk	ECAC Hockey Rookie of the Year; 1985–86	Succeeded by John Fletcher
