= 2022–23 Big Ten Conference ice hockey season =

- Season: 2022–23
- Conference: Big Ten Conference
- Division: Division I
- Sport: ice hockey
- Duration: October 1, 2022– April 8, 2023
- Number of teams: 7
- TV partner(s): Big Ten Network

NHL Entry Draft
- Top draft pick: Adam Fantilli
- Picked by: Columbus Blue Jackets

Regular Season
- Season champions: Minnesota
- Season MVP: Matthew Knies
- Top scorer: Jimmy Snuggerud; Logan Cooley

Big Ten Tournament
- Tournament champions: Michigan
- Runners-up: Minnesota
- Tournament MVP: Adam Fantilli
- Top scorer: Adam Fantilli (12)

NCAA Tournament
- Bids: 4
- Record: 7–4
- Best Finish: National Runner-Up
- Team(s): Minnesota

The 2022–23 Big Ten Conference ice hockey season was the 33rd season of play for the Big Ten Conference's men's ice hockey division and took place during the 2022–23 NCAA Division I men's ice hockey season. The season began on October 1, 2022, and concluded on April 8, 2023.

== Head coaches ==
=== Coaching changes ===
==== Michigan State ====
On April 12, 2022, former Michigan State head coach Danton Cole was fired. On May 23, 2022, Adam Nightingale was named head coach for the Spartans.

==== Michigan ====
During the 2022 offseason, Michigan's head coach, Mel Pearson, was accused of mistreating both players and staff during his tenure with the Wolverines. On August 5, 2022, Pearson was fired. Because the vacancy happened so close to the start of the next season, the Wolverines were not able to perform a typical hiring search. On August 7, 2022, Michigan promoted assistant coach Brandon Naurato to interim head coach for the 2022–23 season.

=== Records ===
Team	Head coach	Season at school	Record at school	Big Ten record
Michigan	Brandon Naurato	1	0–0–0	0–0–0
Michigan State	Adam Nightingale	1	0–0–0	0–0–0
Minnesota	Bob Motzko	5	84–50–11	54–30–10
Notre Dame	Jeff Jackson	18	376–231–66	66–43–9
Ohio State	Steve Rohlik	10	162–127–36	79–76–19
Penn State	Guy Gadowsky	12	159–138–24	78–90–15
Wisconsin	Tony Granato	7	92–106–16	59–69–12

== Standings ==
2022–23 Big Ten ice hockey Standings
	Conference record										Overall record					
	GP	W	L	T	OTW	OTL	3/SW	PTS	GF	GA	GP	W	L	T	GF	GA
#2 Minnesota †	24	19	4	1	2	1	0	57	106	50	40	29	10	1	168	90
#3 Michigan *	24	12	10	2	3	3	0	38	82	79	41	26	12	3	171	128
#7 Ohio State	24	11	11	2	0	0	1	36	69	63	40	21	16	3	131	101
Notre Dame	24	10	10	4	2	0	3	35	52	60	37	16	16	5	85	97
#19 Michigan State	24	10	12	2	1	1	2	34	65	80	38	18	18	2	107	115
#8 Penn State	24	10	13	1	0	3	0	34	71	75	39	22	16	1	129	106
Wisconsin	24	6	18	0	0	0	0	18	54	92	36	13	23	0	94	126
Championship: March 18, 2023 † indicates conference regular season champion * indicates conference tournament champion Rankings: USCHO.com Top 20 Poll

== Non-Conference record ==
Of the sixteen teams that are selected to participate in the NCAA tournament, ten will be via at-large bids. Those 10 teams are determined based upon the PairWise rankings. The rankings take into account all games played but are heavily affected by intra-conference results. The result is that teams from leagues which perform better in non-conference are much more likely to receive at-large bids even if they possess inferior records overall.

The Big Ten performed tremendously well in non-conference games. All seven league members had winning records against other conferences and more than half were at or better than .700. On aggregate, only Hockey East had a winning record against the Big Ten but that was only by 1 game. The overwhelming win/loss totals enabled the Big Ten to have as many as 6 of its member teams ranked in the top 16 during the season.

=== Regular season record ===
Team	Atlantic Hockey	CCHA	ECAC Hockey	Hockey East	Independent	NCHC	Total
Michigan	0–0–0	2–0–0	1–0–1	1–1–0	2–0–0	2–0–0	8–1–1
Michigan State	0–0–0	1–3–0	0–0–0	1–1–0	2–0–0	2–0–0	6–4–0
Minnesota	0–0–0	1–1–0	0–0–0	0–0–0	3–1–0	2–2–0	6–4–0
Notre Dame	0–0–1	2–0–0	0–0–0	1–1–0	1–1–0	1–2–0	5–4–1
Ohio State	4–0–0	2–0–0	0–0–0	0–1–1	1–1–0	0–0–0	7–2–1
Penn State	6–0–0	2–0–0	0–0–0	0–0–0	2–0–0	0–0–0	10–0–0
Wisconsin	0–0–0	1–0–0	0–1–0	0–0–0	4–0–0	2–2–0	7–3–0
Overall	10–0–1	11–4–0	1–1–1	3–4–1	15–3–0	9–6–0	49–18–3

== Statistics ==
=== Leading scorers ===
GP = Games played; G = Goals; A = Assists; Pts = Points; PIM = Penalty minutes

Player	Class	Team	GP	G	A	Pts	PIM
Jimmy Snuggerud	Freshman	Minnesota	24	14	22	36	30
Logan Cooley	Freshman	Minnesota	23	12	24	36	17
Matthew Knies	Sophomore	Minnesota	24	15	15	30	19
Adam Fantilli	Freshman	Michigan	19	11	19	30	45
Luke Hughes	Sophomore	Michigan	22	7	21	28	14
Jackson LaCombe	Senior	Minnesota	22	7	17	24	11
Stephen Halliday	Senior	Ohio State	24	5	18	23	7
Bryce Brodzinski	Senior	Minnesota	24	13	9	22	6
Mackie Samoskevich	Sophomore	Michigan	22	9	13	22	4
T. J. Hughes	Freshman	Michigan	22	7	14	21	8

=== Leading goaltenders ===
Minimum 1/3 of team's minutes played in conference games.
GP = Games played; Min = Minutes played; W = Wins; L = Losses; T = Ties; GA = Goals against; SO = Shutouts; SV% = Save percentage; GAA = Goals against average

Player	Class	Team	GP	Min	W	L	T	GA	SO	SV%	GAA
Justen Close	Senior	Minnesota	22	1300:07	17	4	1	42	5	.935	1.94
Ryan Bischel	Senior	Notre Dame	24	1443:18	10	10	4	55	2	.938	2.29
Jakub Dobeš	Sophomore	Ohio State	24	1432:45	11	11	2	61	2	.912	2.57
Liam Souliere	Junior	Penn State	23	1259:07	9	12	1	60	2	.900	2.86
Dylan St. Cyr	Graduate	Michigan State	24	1391:06	10	12	2	71	2	.913	3.06

== Ranking ==
=== USCHO ===
Team	Pre	1	2	3	4	5	6	7	8	9	10	11	12	13	14	15	16	17	18	19	20	21	22	23	24	25	26	Final
Michigan	6	-	7	6	5	4	1	3	3	5	5	6	7	-	7	6	8	7	6	5	4	4	4	4	4	2	-	3
Michigan State	NR	-	NR	NR	NR	NR	NR	NR	17	16	13	12	11	-	14	17	15	15	17	15	17	18	20	18	19	18	-	19
Minnesota	2	-	2	2	1	1	3	1	2	2	4	3	3	-	3	2	2	2	1	1	2	1	1	1	1	1	-	2
Notre Dame	9	-	11	14	13	12	12	18	20	19	20	19	19	-	20	NR	NR	NR	20	NR	19	20	19	NR	NR	NR	-	NR
Ohio State	16	-	14	11	16	11	9	10	12	12	17	15	14	-	12	8	7	8	7	7	10	8	9	9	8	8	-	7
Penn State	NR	-	NR	20	18	16	13	8	6	7	6	5	5	-	5	5	6	6	9	8	7	9	9	10	10	10	-	8
Wisconsin	NR	-	NR	NR	NR	NR	NR	NR	NR	NR	NR	NR	NR	-	NR	NR	NR	NR	NR	NR	NR	NR	NR	NR	NR	NR	-	NR

USCHO did not release a poll in weeks 1 and 13.

=== USA Today ===
Team	Pre	1	2	3	4	5	6	7	8	9	10	11	12	13	14	15	16	17	18	19	20	21	22	23	24	25	26	Final
Michigan	6	6	6	6	5	4	1	3	3	5	6	7	8	8	7	6	7	7	6	5	4	4	4	4	4	2	2	3
Michigan State	NR	NR	NR	NR	NR	NR	NR	NR	18	16	11	13	11	11	13	16	15	15	19	15	14	18	20	17	17	18	17	17
Minnesota	2	2	2	2	1	1	3	1	2	2	1	2	2	1	1	2	2	2	1	1	2	1	1	1	1	1	1	2
Notre Dame	8	8	9	13	12	12	12	18	20	19	20	19	18	17	18	NR	NR	20	17	NR	18	19	17	20	20	20	19	19
Ohio State	18	18	14	11	16	11	9	11	13	12	17	14	14	14	12	8	8	8	7	7	9	7	9	9	8	8	6	7
Penn State	NR	NR	NR	NR	18	15	10	7	6	7	5	5	6	5	5	5	6	6	9	8	7	10	10	11	10	10	8	8
Wisconsin	NR	NR	NR	NR	NR	NR	NR	NR	NR	NR	NR	NR	NR	NR	NR	NR	NR	NR	NR	NR	NR	NR	NR	NR	NR	NR	NR	NR

=== Pairwise ===
Team	2	3	4	5	6	7	8	9	10	11	12	14	15	16	17	18	19	20	21	22	23	24	Final
Michigan	22	28	2	3	6	11	3	12	10	11	10	8	8	8	7	4	4	3	3	4	4	4	3
Michigan State	22	12	26	12	21	16	10	11	7	9	8	13	13	12	13	16	14	14	18	19	16	16	16
Minnesota	3	7	1	15	17	9	12	2	2	1	1	1	1	1	1	1	1	1	1	1	1	1	1
Notre Dame	22	30	36	16	19	24	20	20	19	16	16	14	15	18	15	14	17	15	14	13	18	17	17
Ohio State	3	2	10	7	9	10	17	16	18	13	12	9	6	6	7	8	8	9	8	9	10	8	8
Penn State	22	39	4	4	3	4	4	5	1	5	5	4	4	3	3	6	5	6	7	8	8	8	8
Wisconsin	22	36	49	34	43	45	37	33	30	29	37	33	32	34	32	33	39	36	32	32	35	37	37

Note: teams ranked in the top-10 automatically qualify for the NCAA tournament. Teams ranked 11-16 can qualify based upon conference tournament results.

== Conference tournament ==
Teams were reseeded for the semifinals

Quarterfinals; March 3–5
2	Michigan	6*	7	—
7	Wisconsin	5	4	—
3	Ohio State	5	1	3
6	Penn State	1	2*	1
4	Notre Dame	1	2	2
5	Michigan State	0	4	4

Semifinals; March 11
1	Minnesota	5
5	Michigan State	1
2	Michigan	7
3	Ohio State	3

Championship; March 18
1	Minnesota	3
2	Michigan	4

Note: * denotes overtime periods.

== Awards ==
=== NCAA ===
Award		Recipient
Hobey Baker Award		Adam Fantilli, Michigan
Spencer Penrose Award		Bob Motzko, Minnesota
Tim Taylor Award		Adam Fantilli, Michigan
AHCA West All-American First Team
Player	Position	Team
Brock Faber	D	Minnesota
Luke Hughes	D	Michigan
Logan Cooley	F	Minnesota
Adam Fantilli	F	Michigan
Matthew Knies	F	Minnesota
AHCA West All-American Second Team
Ryan Bischel	G	Notre Dame

==== NCAA tournament ====
NCAA All-Tournament Team
Player	Pos	Team
Luke Mittelstadt	D	Minnesota
Logan Cooley	F	Minnesota

=== Big Ten ===
Award		Recipient
Player of the Year		Matthew Knies, Minnesota
Defensive Player of the Year		Brock Faber, Minnesota
Goaltender of the Year		Ryan Bischel, Notre Dame
Freshman of the Year		Adam Fantilli, Michigan
Scoring Champion		Logan Cooley, Minnesota
Scoring Champion		Jimmy Snuggerud, Minnesota
Coach of the Year		Bob Motzko, Minnesota
Tournament Most Outstanding Player		Adam Fantilli, Michigan
All-Big Ten Teams
First Team	Position	Second Team
Ryan Bischel, Notre Dame	G	Justen Close, Minnesota
Brock Faber, Minnesota	D	Jackson LaCombe, Minnesota
Luke Hughes, Michigan	D	Mason Lohrei, Ohio State
Logan Cooley, Minnesota	F	Mackie Samoskevich, Michigan
Adam Fantilli, Michigan	F	Jimmy Snuggerud, Minnesota
Matthew Knies, Minnesota	F	Jake Wise, Ohio State
Freshman Team	Position	
Seamus Casey, Michigan	D	
Luke Mittelstadt, Minnesota	D	
Logan Cooley, Minnesota	F	
Adam Fantilli, Michigan	F	
Jimmy Snuggerud, Minnesota	F	

==== Conference tournament ====
Tournament MOP
Adam Fantilli		Michigan
All-Tournament Team
Player	Pos	Team
Justen Close	G	Minnesota
Seamus Casey	D	Michigan
Luke Hughes	D	Michigan
Logan Cooley	F	Minnesota
Adam Fantilli	F	Michigan
Rutger McGroarty	F	Michigan

== 2023 NHL entry draft ==
Round	Pick	Player	College	NHL team
1	3	Adam Fantilli	Michigan	Columbus Blue Jackets
1	19	Oliver Moore ^{†}	Minnesota	Chicago Blackhawks
1	21	Charlie Stramel	Wisconsin	Minnesota Wild
2	34	Gavin Brindley	Michigan	Columbus Blue Jackets
2	41	Trey Augustine ^{†}	Michigan State	Detroit Red Wings
2	45	Maxim Strbak ^{†}	Michigan State	Buffalo Sabres
2	47	Brady Cleveland ^{†}	Wisconsin	Detroit Red Wings
2	49	Danny Nelson ^{†}	Notre Dame	New York Islanders
3	66	William Whitelaw ^{†}	Wisconsin	Columbus Blue Jackets
4	103	Cole Knuble ^{†}	Notre Dame	Philadelphia Flyers
5	137	Jack Phelan ^{†}	Wisconsin	Detroit Red Wings
5	138	Paul Fischer ^{†}	Notre Dame	St. Louis Blues
6	177	Zach Schulz ^{†}	Wisconsin	New York Islanders
7	197	Luke Mittelstadt	Minnesota	Montreal Canadiens
7	213	James Clark ^{†}	Minnesota	Minnesota Wild
7	218	Aiden Fink ^{†}	Penn State	Nashville Predators

† incoming freshman
