= 2022–23 Wisconsin Badgers men's ice hockey season =

American college ice hockey season

- Conference: 7th Big Ten
- Home ice: Kohl Center

Rankings
- USCHO: NR
- USA Today: NR

Record
- Overall: 13–23–0
- Conference: 6–18–0
- Home: 9–9–0
- Road: 3–13–0
- Neutral: 1–1–0

Coaches and captains
- Head coach: Tony Granato
- Assistant coaches: Mark Osiecki; Andy Brandt; Brad Winchester
- Captain: Dominick Mersch
- Alternate captain(s): Brock Caufield; Mathieu De St. Phalle; Jack Gorniak; Anthony Kehrer

The 2022-23 Wisconsin Badgers men's ice hockey season was the 74th season of play for the program and 22nd in the Big Ten. The Badgers represented the University of Wisconsin–Madison in the 2022–23 NCAA Division I men's ice hockey season. They were coached by Tony Granato in his seventh season and played their home games at Kohl Center.

== Season ==
After an abysmal season, Wisconsin was hoping for a resurgence in 2023. Unfortunately for the Badgers, this season the Big Ten was the strongest conference in the nation, boasting upwards of 6 teams ranked in the top 20. Wisconsin was the odd man out and though they did see improvements on both the offensive and defensive side of the puck, it wasn't enough to keep them out of the conference cellar. From the start of the season the Badgers had to face a murderer's row of opponents and played their first 8 games against ranked teams. While they did win two of those games, both were against non-conference competition and only marginally helped the team's cause.

Wisconsin managed to put together a 5-game winning streak in the middle of the season but four of those victories came against two of the lowest-ranked teams in the country and the team followed that up by going 3–11 over the next fourteen games. It wasn't really until the end of the regular season that the Badgers showed any signs of life when they managed to split three consecutive series, all against ranked teams. While it didn't help they at all in regards to their playoff position, it did at least show that they had the potential to make waves in the conference tournament.

In the postseason meeting at Michigan, the Badger's offense show up and scored 9 goals in two games. However, the defense was porous and allowed the Wolverines to score 13 goals.

Shortly after the end of the season, head coach Tony Granato was relieved of his position. The move did not come as a surprise to Granato, who said:

“Based on the end of last year, I knew we had to win this year,”

It was the fifth losing season for the Badgers under Granato in seven years.

== Departures ==
Player	Position	Nationality	Cause
Roman Ahcan	Goaltender	United States	Graduation (signed with Cleveland Monsters)
Tarek Baker	Forward	United States	Graduation (signed with South Carolina Stingrays)
Caden Brown	Forward	Canada	Returned to juniors mid-season (Waterloo Black Hawks)
Ryder Donovan	Forward	United States	Left program (transferred to St. Thomas)
Josh Ess	Defenseman	United States	Graduation (retired)
Tyler Inamoto	Defenseman	United States	Graduation (signed with Ontario Reign)
Max Johnson	Forward	United States	Graduation (signed with Wheeling Nailers)
Jake Martin	Defenseman	United States	Left program (retired)
Brayden Morrison	Forward	Canada	Returned to juniors mid-season (Dubuque Fighting Saints)
Jesper Peltonen	Defenseman	Finland	Graduation (signed with EHC Kloten)
Cameron Rowe	Goaltender	United States	Transferred to Western Michigan

== Recruiting ==
Player	Position	Nationality	Age	Notes
Ben Dexheimer	Defenseman	United States	20	Edina, MN
Jack Horbach	Forward	United States	20	Naperville, IL
Tyson Jugnauth	Defenseman	Canada	18	Toronto, ON; selected 100th overall in 2022
Cruz Lucius	Forward	United States	18	Lawrence, KS; selected 124th overall in 2022
Kyle McClellan	Goaltender	United States	23	Manchester, MO; transfer from Mercyhurst
Robby Newton	Forward	United States	21	Milwaukee, WI
Ty Smilanic	Forward	United States	20	Elizabeth, CO; transfer from Quinnipiac; selected 74th overall in 2020
Charlie Stramel	Forward	United States	17	Rosemount, MN

== Roster ==
As of September 8, 2022.

No.	Nat.	Player	Class	Pos	Height	Weight	DoB	Hometown	Previous team	NHL rights
2	(United States)	Daniel Laatsch	Sophomore	D	6' 5" (1.96 m)	190 lb (86 kg)	2002-02-13	Altoona, Wisconsin	Sioux City Musketeers (USHL)	PIT, 215th overall 2021
3	(United States)	Sam Stange	Junior	F	6' 1" (1.85 m)	208 lb (94 kg)	2001-04-20	Eau Claire, Wisconsin	Sioux Falls Stampede (USHL)	DET, 97th overall 2020
4	(Canada)	Corson Ceulemans	Sophomore	D	6' 2" (1.88 m)	196 lb (89 kg)	2003-05-05	Beaumont, Alberta	Brooks Bandits (AJHL)	CBJ, 25th overall 2021
5	(United States)	Shay Donovan	Senior	D	6' 3" (1.91 m)	195 lb (88 kg)	1998-05-26	Duluth, Minnesota	Wilkes-Barre/Scranton Knights (NAHL)	—
6	(United States)	Zach Urdahl	Sophomore	F	6' 1" (1.85 m)	195 lb (88 kg)	2001-10-13	Eau Claire, Wisconsin	Des Moines Buccaneers (USHL)	—
7	(United States)	Mike Vorlicky	Senior	D	6' 1" (1.85 m)	203 lb (92 kg)	2000-07-17	Edina, Minnesota	Edina High School (USHS–MN)	—
9	(Canada)	Brayden Morrison	Sophomore	F	6' 0" (1.83 m)	170 lb (77 kg)	2002-05-04	Calgary, Alberta	Okotoks Oilers (AJHL)	—
11	(United States)	Jack Gorniak (A)	Graduate	F	5' 11" (1.8 m)	187 lb (85 kg)	1999-09-15	West Salem, Wisconsin	West Salem High School (USHS–WI)	MTL, 123rd overall 2018
12	(United States)	Mathieu De St. Phalle (A)	Junior	F	5' 9" (1.75 m)	170 lb (77 kg)	2000-03-20	Lake Forest, Illinois	Chicago Steel (USHL)	—
13	(United States)	Jack Horbach	Freshman	F	5' 11" (1.8 m)	176 lb (80 kg)	2002-05-04	Naperville, Illinois	Madison Capitols (USHL)	—
16	(United States)	Robby Newton	Freshman	F	5' 9" (1.75 m)	190 lb (86 kg)	2001-07-16	Milwaukee, Wisconsin	Janesville Jets (NAHL)	—
18	(United States)	Owen Lindmark	Senior	F	6' 0" (1.83 m)	195 lb (88 kg)	2001-05-17	Naperville, Illinois	USNTDP (USHL)	FLA, 137th overall 2019
19	(United States)	Brock Caufield (A)	Graduate	F	5' 9" (1.75 m)	181 lb (82 kg)	1999-03-09	Stevens Point, Wisconsin	Green Bay Gamblers (USHL)	—
20	(United States)	Ben Dexheimer	Freshman	D	5' 9" (1.75 m)	172 lb (78 kg)	2002-06-21	Edina, Minnesota	Madison Capitols (USHL)	—
21	(United States)	Carson Bantle	Junior	F	6' 5" (1.96 m)	207 lb (94 kg)	2002-01-22	Onalaska, Wisconsin	Michigan Tech (WCHA)	ARI, 142nd overall 2020
22	(United States)	Caden Brown	Sophomore	F	5' 11" (1.8 m)	177 lb (80 kg)	2003-06-22	St. Louis, Missouri	USNTDP (USHL)	—
23	(United States)	Liam Malmquist	Sophomore	F	5' 10" (1.78 m)	165 lb (75 kg)	2000-10-08	Edina, Minnesota	Penticton Vees (BCHL)	—
24	(Canada)	Anthony Kehrer (A)	Junior	D	5' 11" (1.8 m)	210 lb (95 kg)	2002-03-04	Winnipeg, Manitoba	Sioux City Musketeers (USHL)	—
25	(United States)	Dominick Mersch (C)	Graduate	F	6' 0" (1.83 m)	191 lb (87 kg)	1998-12-16	Park Ridge, Illinois	Lincoln Stars (USHL)	—
26	(United States)	Luke LaMaster	Junior	D	6' 0" (1.83 m)	197 lb (89 kg)	1999-10-17	Duluth, Minnesota	Sioux City Musketeers (USHL)	—
27	(Canada)	Tyson Jugnauth	Freshman	D	6' 0" (1.83 m)	162 lb (73 kg)	2004-04-17	Kelowna, British Columbia	West Kelowna Warriors (BCHL)	SEA, 100th overall 2022
28	(United States)	Charlie Stramel	Freshman	F	6' 3" (1.91 m)	215 lb (98 kg)	2004-10-15	Rosemount, Minnesota	USNTDP (USHL)	—
29	(United States)	Ty Smilanic	Junior	F	6' 1" (1.85 m)	178 lb (81 kg)	2002-01-20	Denver, Colorado	Quinnipiac (ECAC)	MTL, 74th overall 2020
31	(United States)	Kyle McClellan	Junior	G	6' 1" (1.85 m)	185 lb (84 kg)	1999-03-18	Manchester, Missouri	Mercyhurst (AHA)	—
33	(United States)	Ben Garrity	Junior	G	6' 2" (1.88 m)	193 lb (88 kg)	2000-01-20	Rosemount, Minnesota	Minot Minotauros (NAHL)	—
35	(United States)	Jared Moe	Senior	G	6' 4" (1.93 m)	220 lb (100 kg)	1999-07-22	New Prague, Minnesota	Minnesota (Big Ten)	WPG, 184th overall 2018
51	(United States)	Cruz Lucius	Freshman	F	6' 0" (1.83 m)	178 lb (81 kg)	2004-04-05	Grant, Minnesota	USNTDP (USHL)	CAR, 124th overall 2022

== Standings ==
2022–23 Big Ten ice hockey Standings
	Conference record										Overall record					
	GP	W	L	T	OTW	OTL	3/SW	PTS	GF	GA	GP	W	L	T	GF	GA
#2 Minnesota †	24	19	4	1	2	1	0	57	106	50	40	29	10	1	168	90
#3 Michigan *	24	12	10	2	3	3	0	38	82	79	41	26	12	3	171	128
#7 Ohio State	24	11	11	2	0	0	1	36	69	63	40	21	16	3	131	101
Notre Dame	24	10	10	4	2	0	3	35	52	60	37	16	16	5	85	97
#19 Michigan State	24	10	12	2	1	1	2	34	65	80	38	18	18	2	107	115
#8 Penn State	24	10	13	1	0	3	0	34	71	75	39	22	16	1	129	106
Wisconsin	24	6	18	0	0	0	0	18	54	92	36	13	23	0	94	126
Championship: March 18, 2023 † indicates conference regular season champion * indicates conference tournament champion Rankings: USCHO.com Top 20 Poll

== Schedule and results ==
Date	Time	Opponent^{#}	Rank^{#}	Site	TV	Decision	Result	Attendance	Record
Exhibition
October 2	2:00 PM	at Lakehead*		Kohl Center • Madison, Wisconsin (Exhibition)		McClellan	L 2–3 ^{OT}	1,770	
Regular Season
October 7	6:00 PM	at #14 Ohio State		Value City Arena • Columbus, Ohio		Moe	L 1–3	3,519	0–1–0 (0–1–0)
October 8	4:00 PM	at #14 Ohio State		Value City Arena • Columbus, Ohio		Moe	L 3–4	3,041	0–2–0 (0–2–0)
October 14	7:04 PM	#10 St. Cloud State*		Kohl Center • Madison, Wisconsin	BSW	Moe	L 1–5	7,030	0–3–0
October 15	7:04 PM	#10 St. Cloud State*		Kohl Center • Madison, Wisconsin	BSW	McClellan	L 1–2	9,894	0–4–0
October 21	7:00 PM	at #10 Minnesota Duluth*		AMSOIL Arena • Duluth, Minnesota	MY9	Moe	W 5–2	6,573	1–4–0
October 22	6:00 PM	at #10 Minnesota Duluth*		AMSOIL Arena • Duluth, Minnesota	MY9	Moe	W 3–0	7,038	2–4–0
October 28	6:00 PM	#16 Penn State		Kohl Center • Madison, Wisconsin	BSW+	Moe	L 1–2	6,004	2–5–0 (0–3–0)
October 29	6:00 PM	#16 Penn State		Kohl Center • Madison, Wisconsin	BSW+	Moe	L 0–4	6,933	2–6–0 (0–4–0)
November 4	6:00 PM	at Michigan State		Munn Ice Arena • East Lansing, Michigan	BTN+	Moe	L 0–5	5,038	2–7–0 (0–5–0)
November 5	5:00 PM	at Michigan State		Munn Ice Arena • East Lansing, Michigan	BTN+	McClellan	L 1–5	5,318	2–8–0 (0–6–0)
November 11	7:00 PM	Long Island*		Kohl Center • Madison, Wisconsin	BSW+	Moe	W 3–2	6,058	3–8–0
November 12	7:00 PM	Long Island*		Kohl Center • Madison, Wisconsin	BSW	Moe	W 4–3 ^{OT}	7,650	4–8–0
November 18	7:00 PM	Lindenwood*		Kohl Center • Madison, Wisconsin	BSW+	McClellan	W 4–3	5,550	5–8–0
November 19	7:00 PM	Lindenwood*		Kohl Center • Madison, Wisconsin	BSW	Moe	W 5–1	6,974	6–8–0
December 2	7:00 PM	#5 Michigan		Kohl Center • Madison, Wisconsin	BSD, BSW+	Moe	W 6–3	7,464	7–8–0 (1–6–0)
December 3	4:00 PM	#5 Michigan		Kohl Center • Madison, Wisconsin	BSD+, BSW+	Moe	L 2–4	8,619	7–9–0 (1–7–0)
December 9	8:00 PM	at #3 Minnesota		3M Arena at Mariucci • Minneapolis, Minnesota (Rivalry)	BTN	Moe	L 1–7	8,961	7–10–0 (1–8–0)
December 10	6:00 PM	at #3 Minnesota		3M Arena at Mariucci • Minneapolis, Minnesota (Rivalry)	BSN, BSW	McClellan	L 4–6	9,713	7–11–0 (1–9–0)
Holiday Face–Off
December 28	7:30 PM	vs. Lake Superior State*		Fiserv Forum • Milwaukee, Wisconsin (Holiday Face–Off Semifinal)	BSW+	Moe	W 4–0	6,533	8–11–0
December 29	7:30 PM	vs. Clarkson*		Fiserv Forum • Milwaukee, Wisconsin (Holiday Face–Off Championship)	BSW	Moe	L 1–3	6,584	8–12–0
Regular Season
January 6	7:00 PM	#20 Notre Dame		Kohl Center • Madison, Wisconsin	BSW+	Moe	W 2–0	7,256	9–12–0 (2–9–0)
January 7	5:30 PM	#20 Notre Dame		Kohl Center • Madison, Wisconsin	BTN	McClellan	L 4–6	7,256	9–13–0 (2–10–0)
January 13	7:00 PM	USNTDP*		Kohl Center • Madison, Wisconsin (Exhibition)		McClellan	L 1–6	6,313	
January 20	7:00 PM	#7 Ohio State		Kohl Center • Madison, Wisconsin	BSGL, BSW	Moe	W 4–0	7,414	10–13–0 (3–10–0)
January 21	7:00 PM	#7 Ohio State		Kohl Center • Madison, Wisconsin	BSGL, BSW+	Moe	L 0–2	9,766	10–14–0 (3–11–0)
January 27	5:00 PM	at Notre Dame		Compton Family Ice Arena • Notre Dame, Indiana	Peacock	Moe	L 3–5	5,022	10–15–0 (3–12–0)
January 28	6:00 PM	at Notre Dame		Compton Family Ice Arena • Notre Dame, Indiana	Peacock	Moe	L 1–3	5,022	10–16–0 (3–13–0)
February 3	6:00 PM	at #6 Michigan		Yost Ice Arena • Ann Arbor, Michigan		Moe	L 2–6	5,800	10–17–0 (3–14–0)
February 4	6:00 PM	at #6 Michigan		Yost Ice Arena • Ann Arbor, Michigan		Moe	L 4–7	5,800	10–18–0 (3–15–0)
February 10	7:00 PM	#1 Minnesota		Kohl Center • Madison, Wisconsin (Rivalry)	BSW+	Moe	L 1–4	8,018	10–19–0 (3–16–0)
February 11	5:00 PM	#1 Minnesota		Kohl Center • Madison, Wisconsin (Rivalry)	BTN	McClellan	W 3–1	11,075	11–19–0 (4–16–0)
February 17	8:00 PM	#17 Michigan State		Kohl Center • Madison, Wisconsin	BTN	McClellan	L 2–6	8,416	11–20–0 (4–17–0)
February 18	7:00 PM	#17 Michigan State		Kohl Center • Madison, Wisconsin	BTN+, BSW	Moe	W 6–2	10,703	12–20–0 (5–17–0)
February 24	6:00 PM	at #10 Penn State		Pegula Ice Arena • University Park, Pennsylvania		Moe	L 1–6	6,371	12–21–0 (5–18–0)
February 25	4:00 PM	at #10 Penn State		Pegula Ice Arena • University Park, Pennsylvania		McClellan	W 2–1	6,557	13–21–0 (6–18–0)
Big Ten Tournament
March 3	6:00 PM	at #4 Michigan*		Yost Ice Arena • Ann Arbor, Michigan (Quarterfinal Game 1)	BTN+	McClellan	L 5–6 ^{OT}	3,704	13–22–0
March 4	6:00 PM	at #4 Michigan*		Yost Ice Arena • Ann Arbor, Michigan (Quarterfinal Game 2)	BTN+	Moe	L 4–7	5,541	13–23–0
*Non-conference game. ^{#}Rankings from USCHO.com Poll. All times are in Central Time. Source:

== Scoring statistics ==
Name	Position	Games	Goals	Assists	Points	PIM
Cruz Lucius	RW	34	11	23	34	18
Mathieu De St. Phalle	F	36	13	17	30	20
Brock Caufield	RW	36	11	12	23	4
Corson Ceulemans	D	33	8	15	23	38
Carson Bantle	LW	35	9	7	16	14
Tyson Jugnauth	D	32	5	10	15	30
Jack Gorniak	C/LW	31	5	7	12	30
Charlie Stramel	F	33	5	7	12	59
Zach Urdahl	LW	34	6	5	11	14
Sam Stange	RW	34	3	8	11	2
Ben Dexheimer	D	35	0	11	11	12
Owen Lindmark	C	36	4	5	9	10
Jack Horbach	C/RW	32	4	4	8	40
Liam Malmquist	F	33	4	3	7	12
Dominick Mersch	C	35	2	5	7	15
Daniel Laatsch	D	36	1	6	7	6
Mike Vorlicky	D	32	0	7	7	34
Luke LaMaster	D	34	1	2	3	37
Ty Smilanic	C	14	1	1	2	7
Anthony Kehrer	D	26	1	0	1	14
Robby Newton	F	7	0	1	1	0
Shay Donovan	D	11	0	1	1	2
Jared Moe	G	30	0	1	1	2
Brayden Morrison	C	1	0	0	0	0
Kyle McClellan	G	12	0	0	0	0
Caden Brown	C	13	0	0	0	4
Total			94	157	251	424

== Goaltending statistics ==
Name	Games	Minutes	Wins	Losses	Ties	Goals against	Saves	Shut outs	SV %	GAA
Jared Moe	31	1577:02	10	17	0	87	763	4	.898	3.31
Kyle McClellan	15	570:59	3	6	0	34	257	0	.883	3.57
Empty Net	-	24:52	-	-	-	5	-	-	-	-
Total	36	2172:53	13	23	0	126	1020	4	.894	3.48

== Rankings ==
Poll	Week																											
Poll	Pre	1	2	3	4	5	6	7	8	9	10	11	12	13	14	15	16	17	18	19	20	21	22	23	24	25	26	27 (Final)
USCHO.com	NR	-	NR	NR	NR	NR	NR	NR	NR	NR	NR	NR	NR	-	NR	NR	NR	NR	NR	NR	NR	NR	NR	NR	NR	NR	-	NR
USA Today	NR	NR	NR	NR	NR	NR	NR	NR	NR	NR	NR	NR	NR	NR	NR	NR	NR	NR	NR	NR	NR	NR	NR	NR	NR	NR	NR	NR

Note: USCHO did not release a poll in weeks 1, 13, or 26.

== Players drafted into the NHL ==
=== 2023 NHL entry draft ===
Round	Pick	Player	NHL team
1	21	Charlie Stramel	Minnesota Wild
2	47	Brady Cleveland ^{†}	Detroit Red Wings
3	66	William Whitelaw ^{†}	Columbus Blue Jackets
5	137	Jack Phelan ^{†}	Detroit Red Wings
6	177	Zach Schulz ^{†}	New York Islanders

† incoming freshman
