= 2022–23 Ohio State Buckeyes men's ice hockey season =

Ice hockey team season

NCAA Tournament, Regional Final
- Conference: 3rd Big Ten
- Home ice: Value City Arena

Rankings
- USCHO: #7
- USA Today: #7

Record
- Overall: 21–16–3
- Conference: 11–11–3
- Home: 12–4–1
- Road: 7–10–2
- Neutral: 2–1–0

Coaches and captains
- Head coach: Steve Rohlik
- Assistant coaches: J. B. Bittner; Luke Strand; Dustin Carlson
- Captain: Gustaf Westlund
- Alternate captain: Jaedon Leslie

The 2022–23 Ohio State Buckeyes men's ice hockey season was the 60th season of play for the program and 10th in the Big Ten Conference. The Buckeyes represented the Ohio State University in the 2022–23 NCAA Division I men's ice hockey season, were coached by Steve Rohlik in his 10th season, and played their home games at Value City Arena.

== Season ==
After tragically missing the NCAA tournament last season, Ohio State entered this season with high expectations. With last years freshman phenom, Jakub Dobeš, as well as star defenseman Mason Lohrei both returning to the lineup, the team's only real question was who would replace the one-and-done Georgii Merkulov as the Buckeye's biggest offensive threat. Senior center Jake Wise initially stepped to the fore but he was eventually joined by another freshman, Stephen Halliday. Neither Wise nor Halliday had the scoring acumen to be big goal scorers but the playmaking centers helped their teammates post solid numbers, aptly replacing the lost offense.

Ohio State started off the season in good standing, going undefeated in the first 5 games. In the 5th match, however, team captain Gustaf Westlund was felled by an injury that would keep him out of the lineup for over 5 months. In the wake of that loss, the team had one of its worst performance all season and were trounced by Connecticut. They bounced back afterwards and posted three more victories, including a defeat of #1 Minnesota, to run their record to 7–2–1 in the first month of the season.

After taking a week off, the team returned to the ice with a showdown against a surprising Michigan State squad. Unfortunately, that where the team was forced to deal with something they had not prepared for. In the game on November 11, Kamil Sadlocha was given a game misconduct for yelling a racial slur at Jagger Joshua. The Big Ten supported the match penalty but, due to a lack of incontrovertible evidence, would not add any additional punishment. Because of the lack of action from either Ohio State or the Big Ten, Joshua went public with the incident a week later. Though Jagger did not name the offending player, Sadlocha was the only one to receive a match penalty in the game. After the full account of the incident was reported, the Ohio State athletic department sent Sadlocha home for an indeterminate time. He eventually returned to the team in late January but finished out the remainder of his senior season without registering another point.

In the meantime, Ohio State struggled through a bad patch in November and went 2–6 over an 8-game span. While most of those losses were to ranked team, only being able to earn a split at Long Island damaged the team's postseason hopes and had them on the outside of the NCAA picture for a brief time. By December, the team appeared to recover their earlier form and a 6-game winning streak cured many of the Buckeyes' ills. Ohio State performed adequately in the second half of the season, finishing slightly below .500 but managed to take the regular season series from Michigan for the first time in 3 years.

When the Buckeyes entered the postseason, they were sitting 10 in the PairWise ranking and were virtually guaranteed an NCAA tournament berth if they could reach the semifinals. Their opponent in the quarterfinals was a collapsing Penn State team who graciously forgot how to score in the best of three series. Ohio State had troubles of their own but the Buckeyes were able to win two of the games and advance. While the team was outplayed by Michigan in the semifinal, losing a closer game than a 3–7 score would indicate, The Buckeyes were still in the top 10 in the national rankings and easily made the NCAA tournament. While they had finished with a worse record than they had the year before, Ohio State had played a far more difficult schedule and weren't punished as much for those losses.

While the team was ranked 8th, tied with Penn State, Ohio state had a slightly lower ranking and were given a 3 seed. Additionally, because they could not play their own conference in the first round, the Buckeyes were set against #7 Harvard for their opening game. The unfavorable seeding was supposed to have the Crimson as the favorites to reach the quarterfinals but the Buckeyes didn't take any notice. From the start of the game, Ohio State was in complete control. The scarlet and grey shut down the high-scoring Harvard offense in the first two periods, allowing just 8 shots to reach Dobeš, all of which he stopped. The Buckeyes, on the other hand, peppered the Harvard goal with a barrage, recording 34 shots in just 40 minutes. The Buckeyes netted two markers in the first but broke through with a 5-goal avalanche in the second to take an insurmountable 7–0 lead into the third. After an 8th goal early, Ohio State just sat back and played defense for the rest of the game. Harvard was finally able to get on the board late by that didn't affect the outcome of the game and the Buckeyes rolled to an 8–1 triumph.

Things appeared to be heading in the same direction in their next game when Joe Dunlap squeaked a goal through Yaniv Perets just 91 seconds into the game. However, after that the Buckeyes were totally stymied by the All-American goaltender and could not get another goal. Despite outshooting the Bobcats, Ohio State fell 1–4 to Quinnipiac, ending their season with a solid if unfulfilling campaign.

== Departures ==
Player	Position	Nationality	Cause
Eric Cooley	Forward	United States	Graduation (signed with Chicago Wolves)
Grant Gabriele	Defenseman	United States	Graduation (signed with Providence Bruins)
Georgii Merkulov	Forward	Russia	Signed professional contract (Boston Bruins)
Ryan O'Connell	Forward	Canada	Graduate transfer to Michigan Tech
Quinn Preston	Forward	United States	Graduation (signed with Toledo Walleye)
Will Riedell	Defenseman	United States	Graduation (signed with Lehigh Valley Phantoms)

== Recruiting ==
Player	Position	Nationality	Age	Notes
Scooter Brickey	Defenseman	United States	23	Mt. Clemens, MI; transfer from Western Michigan
Davis Burnside	Forward	United States	18	La Grange, IL
Tyler Duke	Defenseman	United States	18	Strongsville, OH
John Larkin	Forward/Defenseman	United States	21	Detroit, MI

== Roster ==
As of July 21, 2022.

No.	Nat.	Player	Class	Pos	Height	Weight	DoB	Hometown	Previous team	NHL rights
2	(United States)	James Marooney	Senior	D	5' 9" (1.75 m)	175 lb (79 kg)	1999-08-16	Chaska, Minnesota	Waterloo Black Hawks (USHL)	—
3	(United States)	Cole McWard	Sophomore	D	6' 1" (1.85 m)	195 lb (88 kg)	2001-06-09	Fenton, Missouri	Tri-City Storm (USHL)	—
4	(United States)	John Larkin	Freshman	D	6' 2" (1.88 m)	190 lb (86 kg)	2001-01-26	Northville, Michigan	Austin Bruins (NAHL)	—
5	(United States)	Tyler Duke	Freshman	D	5' 9" (1.75 m)	180 lb (82 kg)	2004-07-19	Strongsville, Ohio	USNTDP (USHL)	—
6	(United States)	Mason Lohrei	Sophomore	D	6' 4" (1.93 m)	210 lb (95 kg)	2001-01-07	Madison, Wisconsin	Green Bay Gamblers (USHL)	BOS, 58th overall 2020
7	(Canada)	Evan McIntyre	Junior	D	5' 10" (1.78 m)	174 lb (79 kg)	2000-10-17	Oakville, Ontario	Penticton Vees (BCHL)	—
8	(United States)	Scooter Brickey	Senior	D	6' 4" (1.93 m)	215 lb (98 kg)	1999-05-27	North Lakeport, Michigan	Western Michigan (NCHC)	—
9	(United States)	Dominic Vidoli	Senior	D	6' 0" (1.83 m)	190 lb (86 kg)	1999-06-23	Wake Forest, North Carolina	Sioux City Musketeers (USHL)	—
11	(United States)	Kamil Sadlocha	Senior	F	5' 11" (1.8 m)	185 lb (84 kg)	1999-04-12	Carpentersville, Illinois	Madison Capitols (USHL)	—
13	(United States)	Tate Singleton	Senior	F	5' 9" (1.75 m)	177 lb (80 kg)	1998-09-05	West Lebanon, New Hampshire	Central Illinois Flying Aces (USHL)	—
14	(United States)	Dalton Messina	Senior	F	5' 11" (1.8 m)	195 lb (88 kg)	1998-03-29	Macomb, Michigan	Youngstown Phantoms (USHL)	—
15	(United States)	Cam Thiesing	Sophomore	F	6' 0" (1.83 m)	184 lb (83 kg)	2001-03-26	Nashville, Tennessee	Green Bay Gamblers (USHL)	—
17	(United States)	Mark Cheremeta	Senior	F	5' 11" (1.8 m)	185 lb (84 kg)	1999-07-12	Parkland, Florida	Dubuque Fighting Saints (USHL)	—
18	(United States)	Michael Gildon	Junior	F	6' 2" (1.88 m)	196 lb (89 kg)	2001-06-21	Plano, Texas	USNTDP (USHL)	—
19	(United States)	Stephen Halliday	Freshman	F	6' 4" (1.93 m)	210 lb (95 kg)	2002-07-02	Glenwood, Maryland	Dubuque Fighting Saints (USHL)	OTT, 104th overall 2022
20	(United States)	Matt Cassidy	Senior	F	6' 0" (1.83 m)	187 lb (85 kg)	1999-07-31	Medford, New Jersey	Youngstown Phantoms (USHL)	—
21	(United States)	Joe Dunlap	Junior	F	6' 0" (1.83 m)	185 lb (84 kg)	1999-11-30	Windham, New Hampshire	Fargo Force (USHL)	—
23	(United States)	Davis Burnside	Freshman	F	6' 0" (1.83 m)	176 lb (80 kg)	2003-09-22	Scottsdale, Arizona	Dubuque Fighting Saints (USHL)	—
26	(Canada)	Jaedon Leslie (A)	Senior	F	6' 1" (1.85 m)	187 lb (85 kg)	1998-08-04	St. Albert, Alberta	Fort McMurray Oil Barons (AJHL)	—
28	(United States)	Jake Wise	Graduate	F	5' 10" (1.78 m)	185 lb (84 kg)	2000-02-28	Reading, Massachusetts	Boston University (HEA)	CHI, 69th overall 2018
29	(Sweden)	Gustaf Westlund (C)	Graduate	F	6' 0" (1.83 m)	185 lb (84 kg)	1997-12-12	Stockholm, Sweden	Lincoln Stars (USHL)	—
30	(United States)	Ryan Snowden	Senior	G	6' 3" (1.91 m)	205 lb (93 kg)	1998-03-06	Lincoln University, Pennsylvania	Central Illinois Flying Aces (USHL)	—
34	(United States)	Reilly Herbst	Sophomore	G	6' 0" (1.83 m)	185 lb (84 kg)	2000-02-17	Niwot, Colorado	Omaha Lancers (USHL)	—
44	(Czech Republic)	Jakub Dobeš	Sophomore	G	6' 4" (1.93 m)	198 lb (90 kg)	2001-05-27	Ostrava, Czech Republic	Omaha Lancers (USHL)	MTL, 136th overall 2020
65	(United States)	C. J. Regula	Senior	D	6' 3" (1.91 m)	205 lb (93 kg)	1998-05-29	Bloomfield Hills, Michigan	Shreveport Mudbugs (NAHL)	—
71	(United States)	Patrick Guzzo	Junior	F	6' 3" (1.91 m)	198 lb (90 kg)	2001-11-27	Marysville, Michigan	Waterloo Black Hawks (USHL)	—
94	(Sweden)	Travis Treloar	Junior	F	5' 11" (1.8 m)	177 lb (80 kg)	2001-05-12	Kalmar, Sweden	Lincoln Stars (USHL)	—

== Standings ==
2022–23 Big Ten ice hockey Standings
	Conference record										Overall record					
	GP	W	L	T	OTW	OTL	3/SW	PTS	GF	GA	GP	W	L	T	GF	GA
#2 Minnesota †	24	19	4	1	2	1	0	57	106	50	40	29	10	1	168	90
#3 Michigan *	24	12	10	2	3	3	0	38	82	79	41	26	12	3	171	128
#7 Ohio State	24	11	11	2	0	0	1	36	69	63	40	21	16	3	131	101
Notre Dame	24	10	10	4	2	0	3	35	52	60	37	16	16	5	85	97
#19 Michigan State	24	10	12	2	1	1	2	34	65	80	38	18	18	2	107	115
#8 Penn State	24	10	13	1	0	3	0	34	71	75	39	22	16	1	129	106
Wisconsin	24	6	18	0	0	0	0	18	54	92	36	13	23	0	94	126
Championship: March 18, 2023 † indicates conference regular season champion * indicates conference tournament champion Rankings: USCHO.com Top 20 Poll

== Schedule and results ==
Date	Time	Opponent^{#}	Rank^{#}	Site	TV	Decision	Result	Attendance	Record
Regular Season
October 1	7:00 PM	at Mercyhurst*	#16	Mercyhurst Ice Center • Erie, Pennsylvania	FloHockey	Dobeš	W 4–2	1,500	1–0–0
October 2	4:00 PM	at Mercyhurst*	#16	Mercyhurst Ice Center • Erie, Pennsylvania	FloHockey	Dobeš	W 4–2	716	2–0–0
October 7	7:00 PM	Wisconsin	#14	Value City Arena • Columbus, Ohio		Dobeš	W 3–1	3,519	3–0–0 (1–0–0)
October 8	5:00 PM	Wisconsin	#14	Value City Arena • Columbus, Ohio		Dobeš	W 4–3	3,041	4–0–0 (2–0–0)
October 14	7:05 PM	at #17 Connecticut*	#11	XL Center • Hartford, Connecticut	ESPN+	Dobeš	T 0–0 ^{OT}	2,850	4–0–1
October 15	4:05 PM	at #17 Connecticut*	#11	XL Center • Hartford, Connecticut	ESPN+	Dobeš	L 1–6	2,735	4–1–1
October 20	7:00 PM	Bentley*	#16	Value City Arena • Columbus, Ohio		Dobeš	W 9–2	2,611	5–1–1
October 21	7:00 PM	Bentley*	#16	Value City Arena • Columbus, Ohio		Dobeš	W 3–1	3,005	6–1–1
October 28	6:30 PM	#1 Minnesota	#11	Value City Arena • Columbus, Ohio	BTN	Dobeš	W 6–4	3,242	7–1–1 (3–0–0)
October 29	5:00 PM	#1 Minnesota	#11	Value City Arena • Columbus, Ohio	BTN+	Dobeš	L 2–4	3,336	7–2–1 (3–1–0)
November 10	7:00 PM	at Michigan State	#10	Munn Ice Arena • East Lansing, Michigan	BTN+	Dobeš	L 2–4	4,609	7–3–1 (3–2–0)
November 11	7:00 PM	at Michigan State	#10	Munn Ice Arena • East Lansing, Michigan	BTN+	Dobeš	L 3–4	6,387	7–4–1 (3–3–0)
November 18	7:00 PM	#20 Notre Dame	#12	Value City Arena • Columbus, Ohio	BTN+	Dobeš	W 5–2	6,019	8–4–1 (4–3–0)
November 19	5:00 PM	#20 Notre Dame	#12	Value City Arena • Columbus, Ohio	BTN+	Dobeš	L 0–1	4,381	8–5–1 (4–4–0)
November 25	7:45 PM	at Long Island*	#12	Northwell Health Ice Center • East Meadow, New York	ESPN+	Dobeš	L 2–3	526	8–6–1
November 26	8:00 PM	at Long Island*	#12	Northwell Health Ice Center • East Meadow, New York	ESPN+	Dobeš	W 4–1	516	9–6–1
December 2	7:00 PM	at #6 Penn State	#17	Pegula Ice Arena • University Park, Pennsylvania	BTN+	Dobeš	L 1–2	6,361	9–7–1 (4–5–1)
December 3	5:30 PM	at #6 Penn State	#17	Pegula Ice Arena • University Park, Pennsylvania	BTN+	Dobeš	W 4–3	6,410	10–7–1 (5–5–1)
December 16	7:07 PM	at Bowling Green*	#14	Slater Family Ice Arena • Bowling Green, Ohio	FloHockey	Dobeš	W 5–2	4,412	11–7–1
December 17	7:00 PM	Bowling Green*	#14	Value City Arena • Columbus, Ohio	BTN	Dobeš	W 9–4	5,271	12–7–1
January 6	7:00 PM	#14 Michigan State	#12	Value City Arena • Columbus, Ohio	BTN+	Dobeš	W 3–1	4,796	13–7–1 (6–5–1)
January 7	4:00 PM	#14 Michigan State	#12	Value City Arena • Columbus, Ohio	BTN	Dobeš	W 3–1	5,794	14–7–1 (7–5–1)
January 13	6:30 PM	at #6 Michigan	#8	Yost Ice Arena • Ann Arbor, Michigan (Rivalry)	BTN+	Dobeš	W 7–2	5,800	15–7–1 (8–5–1)
January 14	4:30 PM	at #6 Michigan	#8	Yost Ice Arena • Ann Arbor, Michigan (Rivalry)	BTN	Dobeš	L 2–4	5,800	15–8–1 (8–6–1)
January 20	8:00 PM	at Wisconsin	#7	Kohl Center • Madison, Wisconsin	BSGL, BSW	Dobeš	L 0–4	7,414	15–9–1 (8–7–1)
January 21	8:00 PM	at Wisconsin	#7	Kohl Center • Madison, Wisconsin	BSGL, BSW+	Dobeš	W 2–0	9,766	16–9–1 (9–7–1)
February 3	7:00 PM	#9 Penn State	#7	Value City Arena • Columbus, Ohio	BTN+	Dobeš	L 3–4	7,174	16–10–1 (9–8–1)
February 4	6:30 PM	#9 Penn State	#7	Value City Arena • Columbus, Ohio	BTN	Dobeš	W 4–2	8,439	17–10–1 (10–8–1)
February 10	7:30 PM	at Notre Dame	#7	Compton Family Ice Arena • Notre Dame, Indiana	Peacock	Dobeš	L 1–2	5,022	17–11–1 (10–9–1)
February 11	6:00 PM	at Notre Dame	#7	Compton Family Ice Arena • Notre Dame, Indiana	Peacock	Dobeš	T 2–2 ^{SOL}	5,022	17–11–2 (10–9–2)
February 16	7:00 PM	#4 Michigan	#10	Value City Arena • Columbus, Ohio (Rivalry)	BTN+	Dobeš	T 3–3 ^{SOW}	8,593	17–11–3 (10–9–3)
February 18	4:00 PM	vs. #4 Michigan	#10	FirstEnergy Stadium • Cleveland, Ohio (Faceoff on the Lake)	BTN	Dobeš	W 4–2	45,523	18–11–3 (11–9–3)
February 24	9:00 PM	at #1 Minnesota	#8	3M Arena at Mariucci • Minneapolis, Minnesota	ESPNU	Dobeš	L 0–4	9,968	18–12–3 (11–10–3)
February 25	5:30 PM	at #1 Minnesota	#8	3M Arena at Mariucci • Minneapolis, Minnesota	BTN	Dobeš	L 2–5	10,140	18–13–3 (11–11–3)
Big Ten Tournament
March 3	7:00 PM	#10 Penn State*	#9	Value City Arena • Columbus, Ohio (Quarterfinal Game 1)	BTN+	Dobeš	W 5–1	2,673	19–13–3
March 4	5:00 PM	#10 Penn State*	#9	Value City Arena • Columbus, Ohio (Quarterfinal Game 2)	BTN+	Dobeš	L 1–2 ^{OT}	2,921	19–14–3
March 5	5:00 PM	#10 Penn State*	#9	Value City Arena • Columbus, Ohio (Quarterfinal Game 3)	BTN+	Dobeš	W 3–1	1,692	20–14–3
March 11	6:30 PM	at #4 Michigan*	#9	Yost Ice Arena • Ann Arbor, Michigan (Semifinal)	BTN	Dobeš	L 3–7	5,800	20–15–3
NCAA Tournament
March 24	2:00 PM	vs. #7 Harvard*	#8	Total Mortgage Arena • Bridgeport, Connecticut (Northeast Regional Semifinal)	ESPNU	Dobeš	W 8–1	4,462	21–15–3
March 26	4:00 PM	vs. #3 Quinnipiac*	#8	Total Mortgage Arena • Bridgeport, Connecticut (Northeast Regional Final)	ESPN2	Dobeš	L 1–4	4,557	21–16–3
*Non-conference game. ^{#}Rankings from USCHO.com Poll. All times are in Eastern Time. Source:

== Scoring statistics ==
Name	Position	Games	Goals	Assists	Points	PIM
Stephen Halliday	C	40	9	32	41	19
Jake Wise	C	40	12	27	39	10
Mason Lohrei	D	40	4	28	32	26
Tate Singleton	F	40	11	16	27	50
Joseph Dunlap	F	40	13	9	22	41
Davis Burnside	F	40	14	7	21	26
Cole McWard	D	39	9	12	21	28
Travis Treloar	C	35	8	13	21	14
Cam Thiesing	C	40	15	5	20	58
Patrick Guzzo	C/LW	40	9	8	17	6
Michael Gildon	LW	40	3	12	15	40
Matt Cassidy	RW	33	3	11	14	10
Scooter Brickey	D	40	3	11	14	30
Tyler Duke	D	40	4	8	12	45
Kamil Sadlocha	C	26	5	3	8	16
Jaedon Leslie	F	39	4	1	5	14
Gustaf Westlund	C	7	2	3	5	4
James Marooney	D	26	0	5	5	2
Dominic Vidoli	D	23	2	3	5	4
Dalton Messina	F	25	1	3	4	10
Evan McIntyre	D	10	0	2	2	2
C. J. Regula	D	35	0	2	2	16
Reilly Herbst	G	1	0	0	0	0
Ryan Snowden	G	2	0	0	0	0
Mark Cheremeta	LW	6	0	0	0	0
John Larkin	D/F	10	0	0	0	6
Jakub Dobeš	G	40	0	0	0	6
Total			131	221	352	477

== Goaltending statistics ==
Name	Games	Minutes	Wins	Losses	Ties	Goals Against	Saves	Shut Outs	SV %	GAA
Jakub Dobeš	40	2361:16	21	16	3	91	1013	2	.918	2.31
Ryan Snowden	2	30:58	0	0	0	4	12	0	.750	7.75
Reilly Herbst	1	5:40	0	0	0	1	3	0	.750	10.59
Empty Net	-	27:41	-	-	-	5	-	-	-	-
Total	40	2425:35	21	16	3	101	1028	2	.911	2.50

== Rankings ==
Poll	Week																											
Poll	Pre	1	2	3	4	5	6	7	8	9	10	11	12	13	14	15	16	17	18	19	20	21	22	23	24	25	26	27 (Final)
USCHO.com	16	-	14	11	16	11	9	10	12	12	17	15	14	-	12	8	7	8	7	7	10	8	9	9	8	8	-	7
USA Today	18	18	14	11	16	11	9	11	13	12	17	14	14	14	12	8	8	8	7	7	9	7	9	9	8	8	6	7

USCHO did not release a poll in weeks 1, 13 and 26.

== Awards and honors ==
Player	Award	Ref
Mason Lohrei	Big Ten Second Team	
Jake Wise	Big Ten Second Team	
