= 2022–23 Michigan State Spartans men's ice hockey season =

Sports team season

- Conference: 5th Big Ten
- Home ice: Munn Ice Arena

Rankings
- USCHO: #17
- USA Today: #19

Record
- Overall: 18–18–2
- Conference: 10–12–2
- Home: 11–5–1
- Road: 7–9–1
- Neutral: 0–3–0

Coaches and captains
- Head coach: Adam Nightingale
- Assistant coaches: Jared DeMichiel; Mike Towns
- Captain: Miroslav Mucha
- Alternate captain(s): Christian Krygier; Cole Krygier; Nash Nienhuis

The 2022–23 Michigan State Spartans men's ice hockey season was the 81st season of play for the program and 32nd in the Big Ten. The Spartans represented Michigan State University in the 2022–23 NCAA Division I men's ice hockey season, played their home games at the Munn Ice Arena and were coached by Adam Nightingale in his first season.

== Season ==
After spending the previous decade as a moribund program, there were few expectations for Michigan State in Adam Nightingale's first season behind the bench. The Spartans were picked to finish last in the preseason poll, a common result for the team in recent years. Defying expectations, MSU got off to a decent start and posted a winning record over the first month of the season. The big test for the team would come from within their conference as the Big Ten was the strongest league in the nation in 2023. The Spartans stumbled at the start but went 5–1 against Big Ten opponents in November, including a sweep of #10 Ohio State, which earned the team their first appearance in the national polls in three years.

Not everything was clear sailing, however. During the game against Ohio State on November 11, Kamil Sadlocha was given a game misconduct for yelling a racial slur at Jagger Joshua. The Big Ten supported the match penalty but, due to a lack of incontrovertible evidence, would not add any additional punishment. Because of the lack of action from either Ohio State or the Big Ten, Joshua went public with the incident a week later. Though Jagger did not name the offending player, Sadlocha was the only one to receive a match penalty in the game. After the full account of the incident was reported, the Ohio State athletic department sent Sadlocha home for an indeterminate time.

By the beginning of December, Michigan State was near the top of the conference standings and was ranked among the top 10 teams for the NCAA tournament. Staring at what would be their first trip to the tournament in over a decade, Michigan State's season began to unravel. Over an 8-game stretch that was spread out due to the winter break, Michigan State went 1–7. Because seven of those games came against a nationally ranked team, MSU didn't fall out of NCAA tournament contention but they were placed right on the edge of the bubble. Michigan State continued to stub their toes in the second half and ended the year with a .500 record.

When the conference tournament began, Michigan State sat at #19 in the tournament rankings and needed a good performance in the playoffs to climb back above the cut line. Knowing that they needed to win to save their season, MSU was in for a fight with Notre Dame. The Irish were only a few spots ahead of the Spartans and could not afford to lose for their own postseason chances. The Spartans came out firing in the first game, sending 36 shots on goal, but were unable to solve the Big Ten's top goaltender, Ryan Bischel. It wasn't until the 28th minute of game 2 that Michigan State was able to get their first goal but when it came it opened the floodgates. MSU scored 4 consecutive markers to take the rematch, the program's first playoff victory since 2015, and set up a deciding game 3. With both team playing for their seasons, Dylan St. Cyr had his best performance as a Spartan and stopped 37 shots in a 4–2 victory for the Spartans.

The win put Michigan State into the top 16, however, because the final spot was reserved for the Atlantic Hockey champion, the Spartans were still outside the playoff picture. If they wanted to reach the NCAA tournament, MSU would have to take down the top team in the nation and they aimed to do just them when they travelled west to face Minnesota. Knowing they had to play a near-perfect game, the Spartans got off to a good start. MSU opened the scoring on the power play before 5 minutes had elapsed and were pressing the Gophers for much of the first 10 minutes. The Spartans made their first mistake in the 13th minute when Viktor Hurtig took a tripping penalty. On the ensuing power play, Minnesota's wealth of talent enabled the Gophers to tie the score and then completely take over the game. Minnesota scored the final 5 goals of the game and skated away with a rather pedestrian victory despite being outshot by MSU.

Despite just missing out on the tournament, this season could be seen as a success as it was the first non-losing season for Michigan State since 2015.

== Departures ==
Player	Position	Nationality	Cause
Christopher Berger	Forward	United States	Graduation (retired)
Dennis Cesana	Defenseman	United States	Graduation (signed with Charlotte Checkers)
Drew DeRidder	Goaltender	United States	Graduate transfer to North Dakota
Aiden Gallacher	Defenseman	United States	Transferred to Northern Michigan
Adam Goodsir	Forward	United States	Graduate transfer to Long Island
Mitch Lewandowski	Forward	United States	Graduation (signed with Tucson Roadrunners)
Griffin Loughran	Forward	United States	Graduation (retired)
Mitchell Mattson	Forward	United States	Graduation (retired)
Joshua Nodler	Forward	United States	Transferred to Massachusetts
Kristóf Papp	Forward	Hungary	Transferred to Northern Michigan

== Recruiting ==
Player	Position	Nationality	Age	Notes
Matt Basgall	Defenseman	United States	20	Lake Forest, IL
Gavin Best	Forward	United States	21	Richfield, MN
Karsen Dorwart	Forward	United States	20	Sherwood, OR
Zach Dubinsky	Forward	United States	22	Highland Park, IL; transfer from Rensselaer
Viktor Hurtig	Defenseman	Sweden	20	Falun, SWE; selected 164th overall in 2021
Justin Jallen	Forward	United States	24	Saint Paul, MN; graduate transfer from Brown
Miroslav Mucha	Forward	Slovakia	24	Bytca, SVK; graduate transfer from Lake Superior State
Ryan Nolan	Forward	United States	24	Winnetka, IL; transfer from Merrimack
Daniel Russell	Forward	United States	20	Williamsburg, MI
Tiernan Shoudy	Forward	United States	20	St. Clair, MI
Dylan St. Cyr	Goaltender	United States	23	Las Vegas, NV; graduate transfer from Quinnipiac
Michael Underwood	Defenseman	United States	24	Bloomfield Hills, MI; graduate transfer from Clarkson

== Roster ==
As of July 11, 2022.

No.	Nat.	Player	Class	Pos	Height	Weight	DoB	Hometown	Previous team	NHL rights
3	(Sweden)	Viktor Hurtig	Freshman	D	6' 6" (1.98 m)	191 lb (87 kg)	2002-04-28	Avesta, Sweden	Mora J20 (J20 Nationell)	NJD, 164th overall 2021
4	(Canada)	Nash Nienhuis (A)	Junior	D	5' 10" (1.78 m)	178 lb (81 kg)	1999-12-05	Sarnia, Ontario	Omaha Lancers (USHL)	—
5	(Canada)	Powell Connor	Junior	D	6' 2" (1.88 m)	180 lb (82 kg)	2000-05-04	Chilliwack, British Columbia	Trail Smoke Eaters (BCHL)	—
6	(United States)	Cal Dybicz	Junior	D	6' 1" (1.85 m)	185 lb (84 kg)	2000-07-16	Elk Grove Village, Illinois	Tri-City Storm (USHL)	—
7	(Canada)	David Gucciardi	Sophomore	D	6' 1" (1.85 m)	190 lb (86 kg)	2002-10-09	Toronto, Ontario	Waterloo Black Hawks (USHL)	WSH, 213th overall 2022
8	(United States)	Cole Krygier (A)	Graduate	D	6' 2" (1.88 m)	195 lb (88 kg)	2000-05-05	Novi, Michigan	Lincoln Stars (USHL)	FLA, 201st overall 2018
9	(United States)	Matt Basgall	Freshman	D	5' 9" (1.75 m)	179 lb (81 kg)	2002-08-16	Lake Forest, Illinois	Tri-City Storm (USHL)	—
10	(United States)	A. J. Hodges	Junior	F	6' 0" (1.83 m)	180 lb (82 kg)	2001-08-24	Littleton, Colorado	Sioux City Musketeers (USHL)	—
11	(United States)	Jeremy Davidson	Junior	F	5' 10" (1.78 m)	170 lb (77 kg)	2000-02-28	Kalamazoo, Michigan	Fargo Force (USHL)	—
12	(United States)	Justin Jallen	Graduate	F	5' 9" (1.75 m)	178 lb (81 kg)	1998-01-06	Saint Paul, Minnesota	Brown (ECAC)	—
13	(United States)	Tiernan Shoudy	Freshman	F	5' 9" (1.75 m)	176 lb (80 kg)	2002-03-15	St. Clair, Michigan	Youngstown Phantoms (USHL)	—
14	(United States)	Zach Dubinsky	Junior	F	5' 11" (1.8 m)	175 lb (79 kg)	2000-03-14	Highland Park, Illinois	Rensselaer (ECAC)	—
15	(United States)	Christian Krygier (A)	Graduate	D	6' 2" (1.88 m)	190 lb (86 kg)	2000-05-05	Novi, Michigan	Lincoln Stars (USHL)	NYI, 196th overall 2018
16	(United States)	Jesse Tucker	Sophomore	F	5' 11" (1.8 m)	183 lb (83 kg)	2000-03-01	Longlac, Ontario	Green Bay Gamblers (USHL)	—
17	(United States)	Kyle Haskins	Junior	F	5' 10" (1.78 m)	185 lb (84 kg)	2000-02-16	Huntington, Vermont	Waterloo Black Hawks (USHL)	—
18	(Slovakia)	Miroslav Mucha (C)	Graduate	F	6' 1" (1.85 m)	197 lb (89 kg)	1997-10-07	Bytča, Slovakia	Lake Superior State (CCHA)	—
19	(Switzerland)	Nicolas Müller	Senior	F	6' 0" (1.83 m)	175 lb (79 kg)	1999-06-21	Arisdorf, Switzerland	Modo J20 (J20 SuperElit)	—
20	(United States)	Daniel Russell	Freshman	D	5' 9" (1.75 m)	153 lb (69 kg)	2001-11-16	Williamsburg, Michigan	Sioux Falls Stampede (USHL)	—
21	(United States)	Ryan Nolan	Graduate	F	6' 1" (1.85 m)	206 lb (93 kg)	1998-07-14	Winnetka, Illinois	Merrimack (HEA)	—
22	(United States)	Michael Underwood	Graduate	D	6' 1" (1.85 m)	200 lb (91 kg)	1998-07-07	Bloomfield Hills, Michigan	Clarkson (ECAC)	—
23	(United States)	Jagger Joshua	Senior	F	6' 2" (1.88 m)	200 lb (91 kg)	1999-03-29	Dearborn, Michigan	Muskegon Lumberjacks (USHL)	—
24	(United States)	Erik Middendorf	Senior	F	6' 1" (1.85 m)	195 lb (88 kg)	2000-07-11	Scottsdale, Arizona	Chicago Steel (USHL)	—
26	(United States)	Tanner Kelly	Sophomore	F	5' 10" (1.78 m)	165 lb (75 kg)	2002-05-11	San Diego, California	Muskegon Lumberjacks (USHL)	—
27	(United States)	Gavin Best	Freshman	F	6' 2" (1.88 m)	180 lb (82 kg)	2001-08-24	Richfield, Minnesota	Minnesota Magicians (NAHL)	—
28	(United States)	Karsen Dorwart	Freshman	F	6' 1" (1.85 m)	191 lb (87 kg)	2002-09-17	Sherwood, Oregon	Sioux Falls Stampede (USHL)	—
29	(Canada)	Pierce Charleson	Junior	G	6' 2" (1.88 m)	193 lb (88 kg)	2000-02-27	Aurora, Ontario	Brooks Bandits (AJHL)	—
30	(United States)	Jon Mor	Junior	G	6' 2" (1.88 m)	195 lb (88 kg)	2000-07-20	Highland Park, Illinois	Langley Rivermen (BCHL)	—
37	(United States)	Dylan St. Cyr	Graduate	G	5' 8" (1.73 m)	167 lb (76 kg)	1999-05-23	Northville, Michigan	Quinnipiac (ECAC)	—

== Standings ==
2022–23 Big Ten ice hockey Standings
	Conference record										Overall record					
	GP	W	L	T	OTW	OTL	3/SW	PTS	GF	GA	GP	W	L	T	GF	GA
#2 Minnesota †	24	19	4	1	2	1	0	57	106	50	40	29	10	1	168	90
#3 Michigan *	24	12	10	2	3	3	0	38	82	79	41	26	12	3	171	128
#7 Ohio State	24	11	11	2	0	0	1	36	69	63	40	21	16	3	131	101
Notre Dame	24	10	10	4	2	0	3	35	52	60	37	16	16	5	85	97
#19 Michigan State	24	10	12	2	1	1	2	34	65	80	38	18	18	2	107	115
#8 Penn State	24	10	13	1	0	3	0	34	71	75	39	22	16	1	129	106
Wisconsin	24	6	18	0	0	0	0	18	54	92	36	13	23	0	94	126
Championship: March 18, 2023 † indicates conference regular season champion * indicates conference tournament champion Rankings: USCHO.com Top 20 Poll

== Schedule and results ==
Date	Time	Opponent^{#}	Rank^{#}	Site	TV	Decision	Result	Attendance	Record
Exhibition
October 1	7:00 PM	USNTDP*		Munn Ice Arena • East Lansing, MI (Exhibition)	BTN+	St. Cyr	L 3–4		
Regular Season
October 7	7:00 PM	Bowling Green*		Munn Ice Arena • East Lansing, MI	BTN+	St. Cyr	L 1–3	5,472	0–1–0
October 8	7:07 PM	at Bowling Green*		Slater Family Ice Arena • Bowling Green, OH	FloHockey	St. Cyr	W 2–1	3,422	1–1–0
October 13	7:00 PM	#16 UMass Lowell*		Munn Ice Arena • East Lansing, MI	BTN+	St. Cyr	W 4–3	4,419	2–1–0
October 14	7:30 PM	#16 UMass Lowell*		Munn Ice Arena • East Lansing, MI	BTN+	St. Cyr	L 2–3	5,133	2–2–0
October 21	7:00 PM	Long Island*		Munn Ice Arena • East Lansing, MI	BTN+	St. Cyr	W 3–1	4,594	3–2–0
October 22	6:00 PM	Long Island*		Munn Ice Arena • East Lansing, MI	BTN+	Charleson	W 8–4	4,623	4–2–0
October 28	7:30 PM	at #12 Notre Dame		Compton Family Ice Arena • Notre Dame, IN	Peacock	St. Cyr	L 0–5	4,130	4–3–0 (0–1–0)
October 29	6:00 PM	at #12 Notre Dame		Compton Family Ice Arena • Notre Dame, IN	Peacock	St. Cyr	T 1–1 ^{OT}	4,458	4–3–1 (0–1–1)
November 4	7:00 PM	Wisconsin		Munn Ice Arena • East Lansing, MI	BTN+	St. Cyr	W 5–0	5,038	5–3–1 (1–1–1)
November 5	6:00 PM	Wisconsin		Munn Ice Arena • East Lansing, MI	BTN+	St. Cyr	W 5–1	5,318	6–3–1 (2–1–1)
November 10	7:00 PM	#10 Ohio State		Munn Ice Arena • East Lansing, MI	BTN+	St. Cyr	W 4–2	4,609	7–3–1 (3–1–1)
November 11	7:00 PM	#10 Ohio State		Munn Ice Arena • East Lansing, MI	BTN+	St. Cyr	W 4–3	6,387	8–3–1 (4–1–1)
November 18	7:00 PM	at #6 Penn State	#17	Pegula Ice Arena • University Park, PA	BTN+	St. Cyr	L 3–4	5,765	8–4–1 (4–2–1)
November 19	7:30 PM	at #6 Penn State	#17	Pegula Ice Arena • University Park, PA	BTN+	St. Cyr	W 7–3	5,205	9–4–1 (5–2–1)
November 25	7:05 PM	at Miami*	#16	Steve Cady Arena • Oxford, OH		St. Cyr	W 5–3	1,429	10–4–1
November 26	5:05 PM	at Miami*	#16	Steve Cady Arena • Oxford, OH		St. Cyr	W 4–0	1,422	11–4–1
December 2	6:30 PM	#4 Minnesota	#13	Munn Ice Arena • East Lansing, MI	BTN	St. Cyr	L 0–5	6,555	11–5–1 (5–3–1)
December 3	6:00 PM	#4 Minnesota	#13	Munn Ice Arena • East Lansing, MI	BTN	St. Cyr	L 3–6	6,555	11–6–1 (5–4–1)
December 9	6:30 PM	#6 Michigan	#12	Munn Ice Arena • East Lansing, MI (Rivalry)	BTN	St. Cyr	W 2–1	6,555	12–6–1 (6–4–1)
December 10	6:30 PM	at #6 Michigan	#12	Yost Ice Arena • Ann Arbor, MI (Rivalry)	BTN	St. Cyr	L 1–2	5,800	12–7–1 (6–5–1)
Great Lakes Invitational
December 27	7:00 PM	vs. Ferris State*	#11	Van Andel Arena • Grand Rapids, MI (Great Lakes Invitational Semifinal)		St. Cyr	L 2–4	-	12–8–1
December 28	3:30 PM	vs. #17 Michigan Tech*	#11	Van Andel Arena • Grand Rapids, MI (Great Lakes Invitational Consolation)		St. Cyr	L 2–4	6,486	12–9–1
Regular Season
January 6	7:00 PM	at #12 Ohio State	#14	Value City Arena • Columbus, OH	BTN+	St. Cyr	L 1–3	4,796	12–10–1 (6–6–1)
January 7	4:00 PM	at #12 Ohio State	#14	Value City Arena • Columbus, OH	BTN	St. Cyr	L 0–6	5,794	12–11–1 (6–7–1)
January 13	7:00 PM	#5 Penn State	#17	Munn Ice Arena • East Lansing, MI	BTN+	St. Cyr	W 3–2 ^{OT}	6,555	13–11–1 (7–7–1)
January 14	7:00 PM	#5 Penn State	#17	Munn Ice Arena • East Lansing, MI	BTN	St. Cyr	T 4–4 ^{SOW}	6,555	13–11–2 (7–7–2)
January 27	8:00 PM	at #2 Minnesota	#15	3M Arena at Mariucci • Minneapolis, MN	BTN	St. Cyr	L 0–8	10,220	13–12–2 (7–8–2)
January 28	8:00 PM	at #2 Minnesota	#15	3M Arena at Mariucci • Minneapolis, MN	BTN	St. Cyr	L 3–6	10,253	13–13–2 (7–9–2)
February 3	7:00 PM	#20 Notre Dame	#17	Munn Ice Arena • East Lansing, MI	BTN+	St. Cyr	W 3–0	6,555	14–13–2 (8–9–2)
February 4	4:00 PM	#20 Notre Dame	#17	Munn Ice Arena • East Lansing, MI	BTN	St. Cyr	W 3–2	6,555	15–13–2 (9–9–2)
February 10	7:00 PM	#5 Michigan	#15	Munn Ice Arena • East Lansing, MI (Rivalry)	BTN+, BSD+	St. Cyr	L 2–4	6,555	15–14–2 (9–10–2)
February 11	8:00 PM	vs. #5 Michigan	#15	Little Caesars Arena • Detroit, MI (Rivalry/The Iron D Trophy)	ESPNU	St. Cyr	L 3–4 ^{OT}	18,325	15–15–2 (9–11–2)
February 17	9:00 PM	at Wisconsin	#17	Kohl Center • Madison, WI	BTN	St. Cyr	W 6–2	8,416	16–15–2 (10–11–2)
February 18	8:00 PM	at Wisconsin	#17	Kohl Center • Madison, WI	BTN+, BSW	St. Cyr	L 2–6	10,703	16–16–2 (10–12–2)
Big Ten Tournament
March 3	7:00 PM	at #19 Notre Dame*	#20	Compton Family Ice Arena • Notre Dame, IN (Quarterfinal Game 1)	FS2	St. Cyr	L 0–1	5,177	16–17–2
March 4	4:30 PM	at #19 Notre Dame*	#20	Compton Family Ice Arena • Notre Dame, IN (Quarterfinal Game 2)	FS2	St. Cyr	W 4–2	5,198	17–17–2
March 5	6:00 PM	at #19 Notre Dame*	#20	Compton Family Ice Arena • Notre Dame, IN (Quarterfinal Game 3)	FS2	St. Cyr	W 4–2	4,238	18–17–2
March 11	9:00 PM	at #1 Minnesota*	#18	3M Arena at Mariucci • Minneapolis, MN (Semifinal)	BTN, ESPN+	St. Cyr	L 1–5	9,029	18–18–2
*Non-conference game. ^{#}Rankings from USCHO.com Poll. All times are in Eastern Time. Source:

== Scoring statistics ==
Name	Position	Games	Goals	Assists	Points	PIM
Nicolas Müller	C/RW	38	9	25	34	16
Daniel Russell	C	38	8	22	30	29
Karsen Dorwart	F	38	10	17	27	8
Jagger Joshua	LW	37	13	11	24	92
Jeremy Davidson	RW	38	10	11	21	20
Nash Nienhuis	D	32	4	15	19	31
Tanner Kelly	F	38	4	14	18	25
Miroslav Mucha	RW	38	7	10	17	6
Matt Basgall	D	38	4	13	17	14
Cole Krygier	D	38	10	6	16	60
Erik Middendorf	LW	37	7	9	16	12
Tiernan Shoudy	F	38	6	6	12	20
Jesse Tucker	C	31	6	4	10	24
David Gucciardi	D	36	4	6	10	43
Viktor Hurtig	D	34	1	4	5	16
Zach Dubinsky	F	37	1	4	5	21
Michael Underwood	D	38	1	4	5	21
Justin Jallen	F	38	1	4	5	0
Christian Krygier	D	28	1	3	4	23
Powell Connor	D	6	0	1	1	2
Cal Dybicz	D	1	0	0	0	0
Kyle Haskins	F	2	0	0	0	0
Pierce Charleson	G	3	0	0	0	0
Ryan Nolan	F	3	0	0	0	0
A.J. Hodges	LW	9	0	0	0	0
Gavin Best	F	10	0	0	0	0
Dylan St. Cyr	G	37	0	0	0	0
Total			107	189	296	482

== Goaltending statistics ==
Name	Games	Minutes	Wins	Losses	Ties	Goals against	Saves	Shut outs	SV %	GAA
Dylan St. Cyr	37	2162:45	17	18	2	100	1073	3	.915	2.77
Pierce Charleson	8	119:55	1	0	0	10	51	0	.836	5.00
Empty Net	-	17:19	-	-	-	5	-	-	-	-
Total	38	2299:59	18	18	7	115	1124	3	.907	3.00

== Rankings ==
Poll	Week																											
Poll	Pre	1	2	3	4	5	6	7	8	9	10	11	12	13	14	15	16	17	18	19	20	21	22	23	24	25	26	27 (Final)
USCHO.com	NR	-	NR	NR	NR	NR	NR	RV	17	16	13	12	11	-	14	17	15	15	17	15	17	18	20	18	19	18	-	17
USA Today	NR	NR	NR	NR	NR	NR	NR	RV	18	16	11	13	11	11	13	16	15	15	19	15	14	18	20	17	17	18	17	19

USCHO did not release a poll in weeks 1, 13 and 26.

== Players drafted into the NHL ==
=== 2023 NHL entry draft ===
Round	Pick	Player	NHL team
2	41	Trey Augustine ^{†}	Detroit Red Wings
2	45	Maxim Strbak ^{†}	Buffalo Sabres

† incoming freshman
