= 2022–23 Penn State Nittany Lions men's ice hockey season =

Ice hockey team season

NCAA Tournament, Midwest Regional Final
- Conference: 6th Big Ten
- Home ice: Pegula Ice Arena

Rankings
- USCHO: #8
- USA Today: #8

Record
- Overall: 22–16–1
- Conference: 10–13–1
- Home: 13–7–0
- Road: 8–8–1
- Neutral: 1–1–0

Coaches and captains
- Head coach: Guy Gadowsky
- Assistant coaches: Keith Fisher; Juliano Pagliero
- Captain: Paul DeNaples
- Alternate captain(s): Connor MacEachern; Tyler Gratton; Connor McMenamin; Kevin Wall

The 2022–23 Penn State Nittany Lions men's ice hockey season was the 17th season of play for the program and 10th in the Big Ten Conference. The Nittany Lions represented Penn State University in the 2022–23 NCAA Division I men's ice hockey season, were coached by Guy Gadowsky in his 11th season, and played their home games at Pegula Ice Arena.

== Season ==
The start to the season for Penn State could not have been better. The Nittany Lions won each of their first 9 games to rocket to the top of the national rankings. While the slate of games wasn't arduous, PSU was getting consistent scoring from its veteran offensive contingent. The goals being produced were more than enough for Liam Soulière, who had taken over as the team's starting goaltender. The junior netminder helped the team trim its goals against average by about half a goal per game over the course of the year. Those improvements led to the team's early-season success which culminated in a win over then-#1 Michigan.

Penn State got into a bit of a rough patch after they started their conference schedule; the team was only able to earn a split in five consecutive weekends against other Big Ten teams. Luckily, the Big Ten was the highest-ranked team that season and the Nittany Lions were still able to retain a top-10 position in the PairWise rankings. PSU also buoyed itself by sweeping its non-conference schedule, finishing the regular season with a perfect 10–0 record.

When the Nittany Lions began the second half of their season, they were 12 games above .500 and in the top 5 of all polls and rankings. Penn State began to fall from its lofty perch with its first losing weekend of the season to Michigan State in early January. While the offense continued to play well, the defense and goaltending faltered in the back half of the year. Over its final 12 games, Penn State went 3–8–1 and finished 6th out of 7 teams in the Big Ten. The Nittany Lions were doing this despite outshooting and outskating their opponents on most night. In the game against Michigan on January 27, for example, Penn State had twice as many shots on goal (38 to 19) but still carried a 2–4 deficit into the third period where a pair of empty-net goals made the game look more lopsided than it actually was.

Penn State's poor results carried over into the postseason but this time it was the offense that failed. In their 3-game series with Ohio State, PSU scored just 4 goals. While Soulière appeared to recover his early-season form towards the end of the round, he couldn't prevent the Nittany Lions from being knocked out in the quarterfinal round of the conference tournament.

While their poor showing in the second half of the season was worrisome, Penn State was saved by its first half performance, particularly its non-conference record. Despite having a losing record in the Big Ten, PSU was comfortable above .500 overall and ranked 8th nationally at the conclusion of the regular season. That guaranteed them not only a spot in the NCAA tournament, but a #2 seed as well. As the host of one of the four regionals, Penn State was automatically placed in the Midwest bracket (Allentown). They were set against Michigan Tech in the first round and though they were the higher seed, their recent performance tempered expectations for the team. As soon as the puck hit the ice, Penn State returned to their early-season form and completely dominated the Huskies. The Nittany Lions opened the scoring just over 2 minutes into the match and, though they didn't score for the remainder of the period, they controlled the pace of play. PSU netted three goals in the third, getting contributions from across its lineup, to build a 4–0 lead while the defense appeared to half little trouble handling the pop-gun offense of Michigan Tech. Penn State scored 4 more times in the final frame, including a 0-angle goal from Chase McLane, and finish with an overwhelming 8–0 victory. The win was the largest shutout victory in NCAA history, surpassing the mark set by St. Lawrence in 1988.

The Nittany Lions advanced to the Regional Final for the second time in its history and were set against a familiar foe, Michigan. Penn State had surrendered 16 goals in the previous three games to the Wolverines but their play from the Tech game carried over and the Lions held off the Michigan juggernaut. The defense did well to limit the Maize and Blue to 25 shots in the first two periods while Soulière stopped everything that leaked through. Meanwhile, on Michigan's only penalty of the game, Penn State was able to capitalize on their chance and score a power play goal at the end of the second to take a narrow lead. Penn State continued to trade blows with Michigan while neither goalie gave an inch. Ultimately, however, Penn State gave the Wolverines one too many chances and Michigan finally converted on their 4th power play of the game to tie the score. The match headed into overtime and both teams went into attack mode, trying the end the game quickly. Unfortunately for PSU, a perfectly-placed shout from Mackie Samoskevich eluded Soulière's blocker just 52 seconds into the extra session and ended Penn State's season in heartbreaking fashion.

== Departures ==
Player	Position	Nationality	Cause
Oskar Autio	Goaltender	Finland	Graduate transfer to Vermont
Clayton Phillips	Defenseman	United States	Graduation (signed with Wilkes-Barre/Scranton Penguins)
Adam Pilewicz	Defenseman	United States	Graduation (retired)
Mason Snell	Defenseman	Canada	Transferred to Union

== Recruiting ==
Player	Position	Nationality	Age	Notes
Ashton Calder	Forward	United States	24	Sault Ste. Marie, MI; graduate transfer from North Dakota
Jarod Crespo	Defenseman	United States	20	Eastampton Township, NJ
Noah Grannan	Goaltender	United States	20	Germantown, WI
Ture Linden	Forward	United States	25	Great Falls, VA; graduate transfer from Rensselaer
Carter Schade	Defenseman	United States	19	Mars, PA
Alexander Servagno	Forward	United States	20	Gibsonia, PA

== Roster ==
As of July 30, 2022.

No.	Nat.	Player	Class	Pos	Height	Weight	DoB	Hometown	Previous team	NHL rights
2	(United States)	Carter Schade	Freshman	D	5' 11" (1.8 m)	185 lb (84 kg)	2003-03-07	Mars, Pennsylvania	Lincoln Stars (USHL)	—
3	(United States)	Paul DeNaples (C)	Graduate	D	6' 0" (1.83 m)	184 lb (83 kg)	1998-09-19	Moscow, Pennsylvania	Sioux Falls Stampede (USHL)	—
4	(Canada)	Simon Mack	Sophomore	D	5' 10" (1.78 m)	180 lb (82 kg)	2001-03-29	Brockville, Ontario	Des Moines Buccaneers (USHL)	—
5	(United States)	Christian Berger	Junior	D	6' 0" (1.83 m)	182 lb (83 kg)	2000-05-22	St. Louis, Missouri	Omaha Lancers (USHL)	—
6	(United States)	Jimmy Dowd Jr.	Junior	D	5' 9" (1.75 m)	161 lb (73 kg)	2000-07-09	Point Pleasant Beach, New Jersey	Chicago Steel (USHL)	—
7	(Canada)	Carson Dyck	Sophomore	F	6' 0" (1.83 m)	180 lb (82 kg)	2001-06-07	Lethbridge, Alberta	Okotoks Oilers (AJHL)	—
8	(United States)	Alex Servagno	Freshman	F	5' 9" (1.75 m)	170 lb (77 kg)	2002-06-16	Gibsonia, Pennsylvania	Green Bay Gamblers (USHL)	—
9	(United States)	Xander Lamppa	Junior	F	6' 1" (1.85 m)	205 lb (93 kg)	2000-04-30	Rochester, Minnesota	Waterloo Black Hawks (USHL)	—
10	(United States)	Christian Sarlo	Junior	F	6' 0" (1.83 m)	188 lb (85 kg)	2001-06-29	Lynbrook, New York	Lincoln Stars (USHL)	—
11	(United States)	Ryan Kirwan	Sophomore	F	6' 2" (1.88 m)	195 lb (88 kg)	2002-02-27	DeWitt, New York	Green Bay Gamblers (USHL)	—
12	(United States)	Ben Schoen	Sophomore	F	5' 8" (1.73 m)	150 lb (68 kg)	2002-05-18	Maumee, Ohio	Tri-City Storm (USHL)	—
13	(United States)	Danny Dzhaniyev	Sophomore	F	5' 5" (1.65 m)	150 lb (68 kg)	2002-09-15	Brooklyn, New York	Dubuque Fighting Saints (USHL)	—
14	(United States)	Ben Copeland	Senior	F	6' 1" (1.85 m)	185 lb (84 kg)	1999-04-27	Edina, Minnesota	Colorado College (NCHC)	—
15	(United States)	Kenny Johnson	Senior	D	6' 4" (1.93 m)	230 lb (104 kg)	1998-05-28	Ann Arbor, Michigan	Victoria Grizzlies (BCHL)	—
16	(United States)	Dylan Lugris	Sophomore	F	6' 2" (1.88 m)	185 lb (84 kg)	2001-06-23	Buffalo, New York	Jersey Hitmen (NCDC)	—
17	(United States)	Chase McLane	Junior	F	6' 2" (1.88 m)	183 lb (83 kg)	2000-04-22	Trenton, Michigan	Tri-City Storm (USHL)	NSH, 209th overall 2020
19	(United States)	Connor McMenamin (A)	Senior	F	5' 11" (1.8 m)	185 lb (84 kg)	1999-02-25	Collegeville, Pennsylvania	Tri-City Storm (USHL)	—
20	(United States)	Ture Linden	Senior	F	6' 0" (1.83 m)	200 lb (91 kg)	1997-07-06	Great Falls, Virginia	Rensselaer (ECAC)	—
21	(United States)	Kevin Wall (A)	Senior	F	6' 1" (1.85 m)	190 lb (86 kg)	2000-02-01	Penfield, New York	Chilliwack Chiefs (BCHL)	CAR, 181st overall 2019
23	(United States)	Tyler Paquette	Junior	F	6' 3" (1.91 m)	200 lb (91 kg)	2001-03-18	Collegeville, Pennsylvania	Green Bay Gamblers (USHL)	—
24	(United States)	Jarod Crespo	Freshman	D	6' 0" (1.83 m)	190 lb (86 kg)	2002-04-30	Eastampton, New Jersey	Green Bay Gamblers (USHL)	—
25	(United States)	Dylan Gratton	Freshman	D	6' 0" (1.83 m)	180 lb (82 kg)	2003-02-25	Pottstown, Pennsylvania	Sioux City Musketeers (USHL)	—
26	(United States)	Ashton Calder	Graduate	F	6' 2" (1.88 m)	200 lb (91 kg)	1998-02-09	Sault Ste. Marie, Michigan	North Dakota (NCHC)	—
28	(United States)	Tyler Gratton (A)	Senior	F	6' 2" (1.88 m)	187 lb (85 kg)	1999-08-06	Pottstown, Pennsylvania	Central Illinois Flying Aces (USHL)	—
29	(Canada)	Connor MacEachern (A)	Senior	F	5' 10" (1.78 m)	185 lb (84 kg)	1999-07-01	Brooklin, Ontario	Youngstown Phantoms (USHL)	—
30	(United States)	Doug Dorr	Junior	G	6' 4" (1.93 m)	200 lb (91 kg)	1999-05-07	Pittsburgh, Pennsylvania	Utica Jr. Comets (NCDC)	—
31	(Canada)	Liam Soulière	Junior	G	5' 11" (1.8 m)	180 lb (82 kg)	1999-03-16	Brampton, Ontario	Victoria Grizzlies (BCHL)	—
33	(United States)	Noah Grannan	Freshman	G	6' 2" (1.88 m)	190 lb (86 kg)	2002-04-27	Germantown, Wisconsin	Sioux Falls Stampede (USHL)	—

== Standings ==
2022–23 Big Ten ice hockey Standings
	Conference record										Overall record					
	GP	W	L	T	OTW	OTL	3/SW	PTS	GF	GA	GP	W	L	T	GF	GA
#2 Minnesota †	24	19	4	1	2	1	0	57	106	50	40	29	10	1	168	90
#3 Michigan *	24	12	10	2	3	3	0	38	82	79	41	26	12	3	171	128
#7 Ohio State	24	11	11	2	0	0	1	36	69	63	40	21	16	3	131	101
Notre Dame	24	10	10	4	2	0	3	35	52	60	37	16	16	5	85	97
#19 Michigan State	24	10	12	2	1	1	2	34	65	80	38	18	18	2	107	115
#8 Penn State	24	10	13	1	0	3	0	34	71	75	39	22	16	1	129	106
Wisconsin	24	6	18	0	0	0	0	18	54	92	36	13	23	0	94	126
Championship: March 18, 2023 † indicates conference regular season champion * indicates conference tournament champion Rankings: USCHO.com Top 20 Poll

== Schedule and results ==
Date	Time	Opponent^{#}	Rank^{#}	Site	TV	Decision	Result	Attendance	Record
Regular Season
October 7	7:00 PM	Canisius*		Pegula Ice Arena • University Park, Pennsylvania	BTN+	Soulière	W 5–2	6,182	1–0–0
October 8	6:00 PM	Canisius*		Pegula Ice Arena • University Park, Pennsylvania	BTN+	Grannan	W 7–5	6,343	2–0–0
October 13	7:00 PM	Mercyhurst*	#20	Pegula Ice Arena • University Park, Pennsylvania		Soulière	W 6–3	6,038	3–0–0
October 14	7:05 PM	at Mercyhurst*	#20	Mercyhurst Ice Center • Erie, Pennsylvania	FloHockey	Soulière	W 4–1	1,098	4–0–0
October 20	7:00 PM	St. Thomas*	#18	Pegula Ice Arena • University Park, Pennsylvania		Soulière	W 6–2	6,034	5–0–0
October 21	7:00 PM	St. Thomas*	#18	Pegula Ice Arena • University Park, Pennsylvania		Grannan	W 3–2 ^{OT}	6,243	6–0–0
October 28	7:00 PM	at Wisconsin	#16	Kohl Center • Madison, Wisconsin	BSW+	Soulière	W 2–1	6,004	7–0–0 (1–0–0)
October 29	7:00 PM	at Wisconsin	#16	Kohl Center • Madison, Wisconsin	BSW+	Soulière	W 4–0	6,933	8–0–0 (2–0–0)
November 4	8:00 PM	#1 Michigan	#13	Pegula Ice Arena • University Park, Pennsylvania	BTN	Soulière	W 3–0	6,445	9–0–0 (3–0–0)
November 5	7:30 PM	#1 Michigan	#13	Pegula Ice Arena • University Park, Pennsylvania	BTN+	Soulière	L 3–4 ^{OT}	6,361	9–1–0 (3–1–0)
November 10	8:00 PM	at #1 Minnesota	#8	3M Arena at Mariucci • Minneapolis, Minnesota	BTN	Soulière	W 4–2	6,664	10–1–0 (4–1–0)
November 11	8:00 PM	at #1 Minnesota	#8	3M Arena at Mariucci • Minneapolis, Minnesota	BTN+	Soulière	L 1–3	8,921	10–2–0 (4–2–0)
November 18	7:00 PM	#17 Michigan State	#6	Pegula Ice Arena • University Park, Pennsylvania	BTN+	Soulière	W 4–3	5,765	11–2–0 (5–2–0)
November 19	7:30 PM	#17 Michigan State	#6	Pegula Ice Arena • University Park, Pennsylvania	BTN+	Grannan	L 3–7	5,205	11–3–0 (5–3–0)
November 22	7:00 PM	Alaska*	#7	Pegula Ice Arena • University Park, Pennsylvania		Soulière	W 3–2	5,271	12–3–0
November 23	5:00 PM	Alaska*	#7	Pegula Ice Arena • University Park, Pennsylvania		Soulière	W 2–1	5,521	13–3–0
December 2	7:00 PM	#17 Ohio State	#6	Pegula Ice Arena • University Park, Pennsylvania	BTN+	Soulière	W 2–1	6,361	14–3–0 (6–3–0)
December 3	5:30 PM	#17 Ohio State	#6	Pegula Ice Arena • University Park, Pennsylvania	BTN+	Soulière	L 3–4	6,410	14–4–0 (6–4–0)
December 9	7:00 PM	at #19 Notre Dame	#5	Compton Family Ice Arena • Notre Dame, Indiana	Peacock	Soulière	W 5–2	4,357	15–4–0 (7–4–0)
December 10	6:00 PM	at #19 Notre Dame	#5	Compton Family Ice Arena • Notre Dame, Indiana	Peacock	Soulière	L 3–5	5,028	15–5–0 (7–5–0)
December 30	5:05 PM	at #20 RIT*	#5	Gene Polisseni Center • Henrietta, New York	FloHockey	Soulière	W 6–1	3,704	16–5–0
December 31	5:30 PM	#20 RIT*	#5	Pegula Ice Arena • University Park, Pennsylvania		Soulière	W 3–1	5,943	17–5–0
January 13	7:00 PM	at #17 Michigan State	#5	Munn Ice Arena • East Lansing, Michigan	BTN+	Soulière	L 2–3 ^{OT}	6,555	17–6–0 (7–6–0)
January 14	7:00 PM	at #17 Michigan State	#5	Munn Ice Arena • East Lansing, Michigan	BTN+	Soulière	T 4–4 ^{SOL}	6,555	17–6–1 (7–6–1)
January 20	7:00 PM	Notre Dame	#6	Pegula Ice Arena • University Park, Pennsylvania		Soulière	L 1–2	6,558	17–7–1 (7–7–1)
January 21	5:00 PM	Notre Dame	#6	Pegula Ice Arena • University Park, Pennsylvania		Soulière	W 3–2	6,566	18–7–1 (8–7–1)
January 27	7:00 PM	at #7 Michigan	#6	Yost Ice Arena • Ann Arbor, Michigan	BTN+	Soulière	L 3–7	5,800	18–8–1 (8–8–1)
January 28	7:00 PM	at #7 Michigan	#6	Yost Ice Arena • Ann Arbor, Michigan	BTN	Soulière	L 4–5	5,800	18–9–1 (8–9–1)
February 3	7:00 PM	at #7 Ohio State	#9	Value City Arena • Columbus, Ohio	BTN+	Grannan	W 4–3	7,174	19–9–1 (9–9–1)
February 4	6:30 PM	at #7 Ohio State	#9	Value City Arena • Columbus, Ohio	BTN	Soulière	L 2–4	8,439	19–10–1 (9–10–1)
February 17	6:30 PM	#2 Minnesota	#7	Pegula Ice Arena • University Park, Pennsylvania	BTN	Soulière	L 2–7	6,369	19–11–1 (9–11–1)
February 18	6:30 PM	#2 Minnesota	#7	Pegula Ice Arena • University Park, Pennsylvania	BTN	Soulière	L 2–3 ^{OT}	6,461	19–12–1 (9–12–1)
February 24	7:00 PM	Wisconsin	#10	Pegula Ice Arena • University Park, Pennsylvania		Soulière	W 6–1	6,371	20–12–1 (10–12–1)
February 25	5:00 PM	Wisconsin	#10	Pegula Ice Arena • University Park, Pennsylvania		Soulière	L 1–2	6,557	20–13–1 (10–13–1)
Big Ten Tournament
March 3	7:00 PM	at #9 Ohio State*	#10	Value City Arena • Columbus, Ohio (Quarterfinal Game 1)	BTN+	Soulière	L 1–5	2,673	20–14–1
March 4	5:00 PM	at #9 Ohio State*	#10	Value City Arena • Columbus, Ohio (Quarterfinal Game 2)	BTN+	Soulière	W 2–1 ^{OT}	2,921	21–14–1
March 5	5:00 PM	at #9 Ohio State*	#10	Value City Arena • Columbus, Ohio (Quarterfinal Game 3)	BTN+	Soulière	L 1–3	1,692	21–15–1
NCAA Tournament
March 24	5:00 PM	vs. #13 Michigan Tech*	#11	PPL Center • Allentown, Pennsylvania (Midwest Regional Semifinal)	ESPNU	Soulière	W 8–0	7,067	22–15–1
March 26	6:30 PM	vs. #2 Michigan*	#11	PPL Center • Allentown, Pennsylvania (Midwest Regional Final)	ESPN2	Soulière	L 1–2 ^{OT}	8,375	22–16–1
*Non-conference game. ^{#}Rankings from USCHO.com Poll. All times are in Eastern Time. Source:

== Scoring statistics ==
Name	Position	Games	Goals	Assists	Points	PIM
Kevin Wall	RW	39	17	14	31	16
Ture Linden	C	39	11	18	29	11
Connor MacEachern	F	39	12	15	27	30
Connor McMenamin	LW	37	9	15	24	14
Christian Berger	D	39	5	15	20	16
Xander Lamppa	F	37	6	13	19	20
Jimmy Dowd	D	38	4	15	19	36
Ashton Calder	F	38	10	7	17	27
Ryan Kirwan	F	28	8	9	17	4
Christian Sarlo	F	38	7	10	17	29
Tyler Paquette	C/RW	36	7	8	15	8
Danny Dzhaniyev	F	37	7	8	15	12
Tyler Gratton	RW	38	7	8	15	18
Ben Schoen	C	24	3	12	15	16
Simon Mack	D	36	4	8	12	2
Dylan Gratton	D	33	2	9	11	2
Jarod Crespo	D	33	2	8	10	15
Paul DeNaples	D	39	3	7	10	8
Carter Schade	D	36	0	9	9	18
Chase McLane	C/RW	21	2	3	5	18
Alex Servagno	F	19	2	2	4	6
Dylan Lugris	F	8	0	2	2	0
Ben Copeland	C	5	1	0	1	0
Noah Grannan	G	6	0	1	1	0
Liam Soulière	G	36	0	0	0	0
Kenny Johnson	D	2	0	0	0	0
Carson Dyck	F	2	0	0	0	0
Total			129	216	345	326

== Goaltending statistics ==
Name	Games	Minutes	Wins	Losses	Ties	Goals against	Saves	Shut outs	SV %	GAA
Liam Soulière	36	2047:52	19	15	1	83	918	3	.917	2.43
Noah Grannan	8	299:47	3	1	0	17	131	0	.885	3.40
Empty Net	-	20:16	-	-	-	6	-	-	-	-
Total	39	2367:55	22	16	1	106	1049	3	.908	2.69

== Rankings ==
Poll	Week																											
Poll	Pre	1	2	3	4	5	6	7	8	9	10	11	12	13	14	15	16	17	18	19	20	21	22	23	24	25	26	27 (Final)
USCHO.com	NR	-	NR	20	18	16	13	8 (3)	6 (1)	7	6 (4)	5	5	-	5	5	6	6	9	8	7	10	10	11	11	11	-	8
USA Today	NR	NR	NR	NR	18	15	10	7 (2)	6 (2)	7	5 (2)	5	6	5	5	5	6	6	9	8	7	10	10	11	10	10	8	8

USCHO did not release a poll in weeks 1, 13 and 26.

== 2023 NHL entry draft ==
Round	Pick	Player	NHL team
7	218	Aiden Fink ^{†}	Nashville Predators

† incoming freshman
