= 2022–23 Notre Dame Fighting Irish men's ice hockey season =

- Conference: 4th Big Ten
- Home ice: Compton Family Ice Arena

Rankings
- USCHO: NR
- USA Today: #19

Record
- Overall: 16–16–5
- Conference: 10–10–4
- Home: 11–5–2
- Road: 5–11–3

Coaches and captains
- Head coach: Jeff Jackson
- Assistant coaches: Paul Pooley; Andy Slaggert; Jordy Murray
- Captain: Nick Leivermann
- Alternate captain(s): Trevor Janicke; Landon Slaggert

The 2022–23 Notre Dame Fighting Irish men's ice hockey season was the 63rd season of play for the program and 6th in the Big Ten Conference. The Fighting Irish represented the University of Notre Dame in the 2022–23 NCAA Division I men's ice hockey season. They were coached by Jeff Jackson, in his 18th season and played their home games at Compton Family Ice Arena in Notre Dame, Indiana.

== Season ==
Entering the season, coach Jackson brought back a veteran lineup and augmented the roster with several graduate transfers. With Nick Leivermann leading the defensive corps and Ryan Bischel holding the crease, Notre Dame was well apportioned on the back end. Unfortunately, the team had a severe lack of offense. Over the course of the year, the Fighting Irish scored 42 fewer goals than they had in 2022. That dramatic drop-off had a chilling effect on a team that had national aspirations. The Irish hovered around .500 for most of the season and were only once able to string more than two wins together. Fortunately, for Notre Dame, the Big Ten was the strongest conference this season and enabled the team to be in position for a potential at-large bid despite having nearly as many wins as losses.

The Irish ended the regular season well, taking two consecutive weekends from high-ranked teams and raising themselves into the top 16. The good stretch also lifted the team up to fourth in the conference standings, giving Notre Dame a home site for the quarterfinals. With other teams still vying for a tournament appearance, the Irish needed a decent postseason run to remain above the cut line and they were faced with Michigan State (MSU) in the first round. The Spartans, too, were competing for an at-large bid and whichever of the two lost the best-of-three series would be knocked out of contention. Ryan Bischel held off a strong MSU attack in the first game, earning a 1–0 victory for the Irish. The second game started much the same and Notre Dame had a one-goal lead after the first period. In the second period, however, the wheels came off for the Irish as Michigan State scored 4 consecutive goals and evened the series at one all. In the deciding game, Notre Dame played as well as could be expected, outshooting MSU 39–28, going 2-for-4 on the power play and not taking a single penalty in the game. However, former Irish netminder, Dylan St. Cyr, came back to haunt his old team and stopped 37 shots to lead the Spartans to a 2–4 victory.

== Departures ==
Player	Position	Nationality	Cause
Cam Burke	Forward	United States	Graduate transfer to Boston College
Max Ellis	Forward	United States	Signed professional contract (Toronto Maple Leafs)
Matthew Galajda	Goaltender	Canada	Graduation (signed with Djurgårdens IF Hockey)
Adam Karashik	Defenseman	United States	Graduation (signed with Lehigh Valley Phantoms)
Conor Klaers	Goaltender	United States	Graduation (retired)
Jake Pivonka	Forward	United States	Graduate transfer to Omaha
Charlie Raith	Defenseman	United States	Graduation (retired)
Graham Slaggert	Forward	United States	Graduation (signed with Toronto Marlies)
Spencer Stastney	Defenseman	United States	Graduation (signed with Nashville Predators)

== Recruiting ==
Player	Position	Nationality	Age	Notes
Drew Bavaro	Defenseman	United States	22	Bradenton, FL; transfer from Bentley
Benjamin Brinkman	Defenseman	United States	21	Edina, MN; graduate transfer from Minnesota; selected 173rd overall in 2019
Niko Jovanovic	Forward	Canada	20	North Vancouver, BC
Michael Mastrodomenico	Defenseman	Canada	18	Kirkland, QC
Jackson Pierson	Forward	United States	23	Zionsville, IN; graduate transfer from New Hampshire
Chayse Primeau	Forward	United States	25	Margate, NJ; graduate transfer from Omaha
Fin Williams	Forward	Canada	19	North Vancouver, BC
Jack Williams	Goaltender	United States	21	St. Louis, MO

== Roster ==
As of August 25, 2022.

No.	Nat.	Player	Class	Pos	Height	Weight	DoB	Hometown	Previous team	NHL rights
2	(United States)	Ben Brinkman	Graduate	D	6' 1" (1.85 m)	220 lb (100 kg)	2000-10-04	Edina, Minnesota	Minnesota (Big Ten)	DAL, 173rd overall 2019
3	(Canada)	Mike Mastrodomenico	Freshman	D	6' 0" (1.83 m)	205 lb (93 kg)	2004-04-19	Kirkland, Quebec	Lincoln Stars (USHL)	—
4	(United States)	Nick Leivermann (C)	Graduate	D	5' 11" (1.8 m)	186 lb (84 kg)	1998-09-14	Eden Prairie, Minnesota	Penticton Vees (BCHL)	COL, 187th overall 2017
5	(United States)	Chase Blackmun	Graduate	D	6' 0" (1.83 m)	195 lb (88 kg)	1999-04-02	Hudson, Wisconsin	Massachusetts Lowell (HEA)	—
6	(United States)	Jake Boltmann	Junior	D	6' 1" (1.85 m)	200 lb (91 kg)	2001-10-19	Edina, Minnesota	Lincoln Stars (USHL)	CGY, 80th overall 2020
8	(United States)	Justin Janicke	Sophomore	F	6' 0" (1.83 m)	188 lb (85 kg)	2003-06-30	Maple Grove, Minnesota	USNTDP (USHL)	SEA, 195th overall 2021
9	(United States)	Grant Silianoff	Junior	F	5' 11" (1.8 m)	178 lb (81 kg)	2001-01-04	Edina, Minnesota	Cedar Rapids RoughRiders (USHL)	—
10	(United States)	Hunter Strand	Sophomore	F	5' 11" (1.8 m)	188 lb (85 kg)	2002-11-13	Anchorage, Alaska	Tri-City Storm (USHL)	—
11	(United States)	Jackson Pierson	Graduate	F	5' 9" (1.75 m)	171 lb (78 kg)	1999-09-10	Zionsville, Indiana	New Hampshire (HEA)	—
12	(United States)	Ryder Rolston	Junior	F	6' 2" (1.88 m)	190 lb (86 kg)	2001-10-31	Birmingham, Michigan	Waterloo Black Hawks (USHL)	CHI, 139th overall 2020
13	(United States)	Chayse Primeau	Graduate	F	6' 3" (1.91 m)	193 lb (88 kg)	1997-09-15	Margate City, New Jersey	Omaha (NCHC)	—
14	(Canada)	Jesse Lansdell	Senior	F	5' 11" (1.8 m)	188 lb (85 kg)	1998-08-05	Surrey, British Columbia	Vernon Vipers (BCHL)	—
17	(Canada)	Ryan Helliwell	Sophomore	D	6' 0" (1.83 m)	191 lb (87 kg)	2002-08-05	Burnaby, British Columbia	Trail Smoke Eaters (BCHL)	—
19	(United States)	Landon Slaggert (A)	Junior	F	6' 0" (1.83 m)	190 lb (86 kg)	2002-06-25	South Bend, Indiana	USNTDP (USHL)	CHI, 79th overall 2020
20	(Canada)	Niko Jovanovic	Freshman	F	6' 4" (1.93 m)	216 lb (98 kg)	2002-06-13	West Vancouver, British Columbia	Spruce Grove Saints (AJHL)	—
21	(Canada)	Fin Williams	Freshman	F	6' 1" (1.85 m)	186 lb (84 kg)	2003-04-21	North Vancouver, British Columbia	Penticton Vees (BCHL)	—
22	(United States)	Jack Adams	Graduate	F	6' 6" (1.98 m)	215 lb (98 kg)	1997-02-05	Boxford, Massachusetts	Providence (HEA)	DET, 162nd overall 2017
23	(United States)	Brady Bjork	Junior	F	6' 1" (1.85 m)	177 lb (80 kg)	1999-05-17	Mequon, Wisconsin	St. Cloud Norsemen (NAHL)	—
24	(United States)	Drew Bavaro	Junior	D	6' 2" (1.88 m)	198 lb (90 kg)	2000-06-10	Bradenton, Florida	Bentley (AHA)	—
25	(United States)	Solag Bakich	Senior	F	6' 0" (1.83 m)	195 lb (88 kg)	1998-01-08	Dallas, Texas	Waterloo Black Hawks (USHL)	—
26	(United States)	Zach Plucinski	Junior	D	6' 1" (1.85 m)	204 lb (93 kg)	2000-07-26	Eagle River, Alaska	Omaha Lancers (USHL)	—
27	(United States)	Trevor Janicke (A)	Senior	F	5' 10" (1.78 m)	200 lb (91 kg)	2000-12-25	Maple Grove, Minnesota	Central Illinois Flying Aces (USHL)	ANA, 132nd overall 2019
28	(United States)	Tyler Carpenter	Sophomore	F	5' 11" (1.8 m)	186 lb (84 kg)	2000-08-27	Palatine, Illinois	Omaha Lancers (USHL)	—
29	(United States)	Jack Williams	Freshman	G	6' 3" (1.91 m)	187 lb (85 kg)	2001-06-21	St. Louis, Missouri	Waterloo Black Hawks (USHL)	—
30	(United States)	Ryan Bischel	Senior	G	6' 1" (1.85 m)	190 lb (86 kg)	1999-07-05	Medina, Minnesota	Fargo Force (USHL)	—
32	(United States)	Hunter Weiss	Sophomore	D	6' 3" (1.91 m)	220 lb (100 kg)	2001-03-29	Lake Forest, Illinois	Minnesota Magicians (NAHL)	—
33	(United States)	Josh Graziano	Junior	G	6' 3" (1.91 m)	215 lb (98 kg)	2000-03-22	Buffalo, New York	Johnstown Tomahawks (NAHL)	—

== Standings ==
2022–23 Big Ten ice hockey Standings
	Conference record										Overall record					
	GP	W	L	T	OTW	OTL	3/SW	PTS	GF	GA	GP	W	L	T	GF	GA
#2 Minnesota †	24	19	4	1	2	1	0	57	106	50	40	29	10	1	168	90
#3 Michigan *	24	12	10	2	3	3	0	38	82	79	41	26	12	3	171	128
#7 Ohio State	24	11	11	2	0	0	1	36	69	63	40	21	16	3	131	101
Notre Dame	24	10	10	4	2	0	3	35	52	60	37	16	16	5	85	97
#19 Michigan State	24	10	12	2	1	1	2	34	65	80	38	18	18	2	107	115
#8 Penn State	24	10	13	1	0	3	0	34	71	75	39	22	16	1	129	106
Wisconsin	24	6	18	0	0	0	0	18	54	92	36	13	23	0	94	126
Championship: March 18, 2023 † indicates conference regular season champion * indicates conference tournament champion Rankings: USCHO.com Top 20 Poll

== Schedule and results ==
Date	Time	Opponent^{#}	Rank^{#}	Site	TV	Decision	Result	Attendance	Record
Exhibition
October 2	5:00 p.m.	USNTDP*	#9	Compton Family Ice Arena • Notre Dame, Indiana (Exhibition)	Peacock	Bischel	L 3–5 ^{OT}	0	
Ice Breaker Tournament
October 7	9:05 p.m.	at #1 Denver*	#11	Magness Arena • Denver, Colorado (Ice Breaker Tournament)	Altitude	Bischel	L 2–5	5,859	0–1–0
October 8	9:05 p.m.	at Air Force*	#11	Cadet Ice Arena • Colorado Springs, Colorado (Ice Breaker Tournament)		Williams	T 5–5 ^{OT}	2,473	0–1–1
Regular season
October 14	7:30 p.m.	Northern Michigan*	#14	Compton Family Ice Arena • Notre Dame, Indiana	Peacock	Bischel	W 3–1	5,002	1–1–1
October 16	5:00 p.m.	Northern Michigan*	#14	Compton Family Ice Arena • Notre Dame, Indiana	Peacock	Bischel	W 5–4	3,521	2–1–1
October 21	7:00 p.m.	#17 Western Michigan*	#13	Compton Family Ice Arena • Notre Dame, Indiana	Peacock	Bischel	W 2–0	5,096	3–1–1
October 22	6:00 p.m.	at #17 Western Michigan*	#13	Lawson Arena • Kalamazoo, Michigan		Bischel	L 0–4	3,224	3–2–1
October 28	7:30 p.m.	Michigan State	#12	Compton Family Ice Arena • Notre Dame, Indiana	Peacock	Bischel	W 5–0	4,130	4–2–1 (1–0–0)
October 29	6:00 p.m.	Michigan State	#12	Compton Family Ice Arena • Notre Dame, Indiana	Peacock	Bischel	T 1–1 ^{OT}	4,458	4–2–2 (1–0–1)
November 4	8:00 p.m.	at #3 Minnesota	#12	3M Arena at Mariucci • Minneapolis, Minnesota	BTN+	Bischel	L 1–4	7,774	4–3–2 (1–1–1)
November 5	8:00 p.m.	at #3 Minnesota	#12	3M Arena at Mariucci • Minneapolis, Minnesota	BTN+	Bischel	L 0–3	8,291	4–4–2 (1–2–1)
November 11	7:30 p.m.	#3 Michigan	#18	Compton Family Ice Arena • Notre Dame, Indiana (Rivalry)	Peacock	Bischel	L 1–5	5,103	4–5–2 (1–3–1)
November 12	6:00 p.m.	#3 Michigan	#18	Compton Family Ice Arena • Notre Dame, Indiana	Peacock	Bischel	W 3–2	5,099	5–5–2 (2–3–1)
November 18	7:00 p.m.	at #12 Ohio State	#20	Value City Arena • Columbus, Ohio		Bischel	L 2–5	6,019	5–6–2 (2–4–1)
November 19	5:00 p.m.	at #12 Ohio State	#20	Value City Arena • Columbus, Ohio		Bischel	W 1–0	4,381	6–6–2 (3–4–1)
November 23	6:00 p.m.	at #11 Boston University*	#19	Agganis Arena • Boston, Massachusetts	ESPNU	Bischel	L 2–5	3,912	6–7–2
November 25	4:00 p.m.	at Boston College*	#19	Conte Forum • Chestnut Hill, Massachusetts (Holy War on Ice)	ESPN+	Bischel	W 5–2	6,234	7–7–2
December 9	7:00 p.m.	#5 Penn State	#19	Compton Family Ice Arena • Notre Dame, Indiana	Peacock	Bischel	L 2–5	4,357	7–8–2 (3–5–1)
December 10	6:00 p.m.	#5 Penn State	#19	Compton Family Ice Arena • Notre Dame, Indiana	Peacock	Bischel	W 5–3	5,028	8–8–2 (4–5–1)
December 31	5:00 p.m.	Alaska*	#19	Compton Family Ice Arena • Notre Dame, Indiana	Peacock	Bischel	L 2–3	4,878	8–9–2
January 1	5:00 p.m.	Alaska*	#19	Compton Family Ice Arena • Notre Dame, Indiana	Peacock	Bischel	W 2–0	4,911	9–9–2
January 6	8:00 p.m.	at Wisconsin	#20	Kohl Center • Madison, Wisconsin	BSW+	Bischel	L 0–2	7,256	9–10–2 (4–6–1)
January 7	6:30 p.m.	at Wisconsin	#20	Kohl Center • Madison, Wisconsin	BTN	Bischel	W 6–4	9,167	10–10–2 (5–6–1)
January 13	7:30 p.m.	#2 Minnesota		Compton Family Ice Arena • Notre Dame, Indiana	Peacock	Bischel	T 2–2 ^{SOW}	4,984	10–10–3 (5–6–2)
January 14	6:00 p.m.	#2 Minnesota		Compton Family Ice Arena • Notre Dame, Indiana	Peacock	Bischel	L 0–3	5,022	10–11–3 (5–7–2)
January 20	7:00 p.m.	at #6 Penn State		Pegula Ice Arena • University Park, Pennsylvania		Bischel	W 2–1	6,558	11–11–3 (6–7–2)
January 21	5:00 p.m.	at #6 Penn State		Pegula Ice Arena • University Park, Pennsylvania		Bischel	L 2–3	6,566	11–12–3 (6–8–2)
January 27	7:30 p.m.	Wisconsin		Compton Family Ice Arena • Notre Dame, Indiana	Peacock	Bischel	W 5–3	5,022	12–12–3 (7–8–2)
January 28	6:00 p.m.	Wisconsin		Compton Family Ice Arena • Notre Dame, Indiana	Peacock	Bischel	W 3–1	5,022	13–12–3 (8–8–2)
February 3	7:00 p.m.	at #17 Michigan State	#20	Munn Ice Arena • East Lansing, Michigan	BTN+	Bischel	L 0–3	6,555	13–13–3 (8–9–2)
February 4	4:00 p.m.	at #17 Michigan State	#20	Munn Ice Arena • East Lansing, Michigan	BTN	Bischel	L 2–3	6,555	13–14–3 (8–10–2)
February 10	7:30 p.m.	#7 Ohio State		Compton Family Ice Arena • Notre Dame, Indiana	Peacock	Bischel	W 2–1	5,022	14–14–3 (9–10–2)
February 11	6:00 p.m.	#7 Ohio State		Compton Family Ice Arena • Notre Dame, Indiana	Peacock	Bischel	T 2–2 ^{SOW}	5,022	14–14–4 (9–10–3)
February 24	7:00 p.m.	at #4 Michigan	#20	Yost Ice Arena • Ann Arbor, Michigan (Rivalry)	BTN+	Bischel	T 3–3 ^{SOW}	5,800	14–14–5 (9–10–4)
February 25	8:00 p.m.	at #4 Michigan	#20	Yost Ice Arena • Ann Arbor, Michigan (Rivalry)	BTN	Bischel	W 2–1 ^{OT}	5,800	15–14–5 (9–10–4)
Big Ten tournament
March 3	7:00 p.m.	#20 Michigan State	#19	Compton Family Ice Arena • Notre Dame, IN (Quarterfinal Game 1)	FS2	Bischel	W 1–0	5,177	16–14–5
March 4	4:30 p.m.	#20 Michigan State	#19	Compton Family Ice Arena • Notre Dame, IN (Quarterfinal Game 2)	FS2	Bischel	L 2–4	5,198	16–15–5
March 5	6:00 p.m.	#20 Michigan State	#19	Compton Family Ice Arena • Notre Dame, IN (Quarterfinal Game 3)	FS2	Bischel	L 2–4	4,238	16–16–5
*Non-conference game. ^{#}Rankings from USCHO.com Poll. All times are in Eastern Time. Source:

== Scoring statistics ==
Name	Position	Games	Goals	Assists	Points	PIM
Chayse Primeau	C/W	37	8	15	23	18
Trevor Janicke	C/RW	37	8	14	22	12
Ryder Rolston	C/W	27	7	13	20	4
Nick Leivermann	D	29	6	14	20	18
Drew Bavaro	D	37	6	13	19	31
Jesse Lansdell	F	36	6	9	15	64
Hunter Strand	C	37	5	10	15	21
Justin Janicke	F	36	7	7	14	32
John Adams	C/RW	32	7	6	13	10
Landon Slaggert	C/LW	35	7	6	13	14
Chase Blackmun	D	34	2	9	11	10
Grant Silianoff	RW	33	3	6	9	6
Jackson Pierson	C	31	1	8	9	10
Solag Bakich	F	35	3	5	8	20
Tyler Carpenter	F	30	3	4	7	8
Zachary Plucinski	D	31	1	4	5	27
Jake Boltmann	D	37	1	4	5	48
Ben Brinkman	D	35	2	2	4	20
Ryan Helliwell	D	31	1	3	4	19
Fin Williams	F	22	1	1	2	6
Niko Jovanovic	F	8	0	2	2	2
Mike Mastrodomenico	D	22	0	1	1	12
Ryan Bischel	G	37	0	1	1	0
Jack Williams	G	2	0	0	0	0
Brady Bjork	C	6	0	0	0	0
Bench	-	-	-	-	-	18
Total			85	157	242	424

== Goaltending statistics ==
Name	Games	Minutes	Wins	Losses	Ties	Goals against	Saves	Shut-outs	SV %	GAA
Ryan Bischel	37	2182:51	16	16	4	87	1183	5	.931	2.39
Jack Williams	2	41:27	0	0	1	2	16	0	.889	2.90
Empty Net	-	24:38	-	-	-	8	-	-	-	-
Total	37	2248:56	16	16	5	97	1199	5	.925	2.59

== Rankings ==
Poll	Week																											
Poll	Pre	1	2	3	4	5	6	7	8	9	10	11	12	13	14	15	16	17	18	19	20	21	22	23	24	25	26	27 (Final)
USCHO.com	9	-	11	14	13	12	12	18	20	19	20	19	19	-	20	NR	NR	NR	20	NR	19	20	19	NR	NR	NR	-	NR
USA Today	8	8	9	13	12	12	12	18	20	19	20	19	18	17	18	NR	NR	20	17	NR	18	19	17	20	20	20	19	19

USCHO did not release a poll in weeks 1, 13 and 26.

== Awards and honors ==
Player	Award	Ref
Ryan Bischel	AHCA West All-American Second Team	
Ryan Bischel	Big Ten Goaltender of the Year	
Ryan Bischel	Big Ten First Team	

== Players drafted into the NHL ==
=== 2023 NHL entry draft ===
Round	Pick	Player	NHL team
2	49	Danny Nelson ^{†}	New York Islanders
4	103	Cole Knuble ^{†}	Philadelphia Flyers
5	138	Paul Fischer ^{†}	St. Louis Blues

† incoming freshman
