= 2023 Big Ten men's ice hockey tournament =

- Dates: March 3–18, 2023
- Teams: 7
- Finals site: 3M Arena at Mariucci; Minneapolis, Minnesota
- Champions: Michigan (3rd title)
- Winning coach: Brandon Naurato (1st title)
- MVP: Adam Fantilli (Michigan)
- Big Ten men's Ice Hockey Tournaments

The 2023 Big Ten Conference men's ice hockey tournament was the tenth tournament in conference history. It was played between March 3 and March 18, 2023, on-campus locations. As the tournament winner, Michigan earned the Big Ten's automatic bid to the 2023 NCAA Division I men's ice hockey tournament.

== Format ==
The tournament featured a format with all games taking place on the campus of the higher-seeded teams. The tournament opened with three best-of-three quarterfinal series, as the second, third and fourth-seeded teams each hosting a series. The top-seeded team had a bye to the single-elimination semifinals. The highest-seeded team remaining after the semifinals hosted the championship game.

== Conference standings ==
2022–23 Big Ten ice hockey Standings
	Conference record										Overall record					
	GP	W	L	T	OTW	OTL	3/SW	PTS	GF	GA	GP	W	L	T	GF	GA
#2 Minnesota †	24	19	4	1	2	1	0	57	106	50	40	29	10	1	168	90
#3 Michigan *	24	12	10	2	3	3	0	38	82	79	41	26	12	3	171	128
#7 Ohio State	24	11	11	2	0	0	1	36	69	63	40	21	16	3	131	101
Notre Dame	24	10	10	4	2	0	3	35	52	60	37	16	16	5	85	97
#19 Michigan State	24	10	12	2	1	1	2	34	65	80	38	18	18	2	107	115
#8 Penn State	24	10	13	1	0	3	0	34	71	75	39	22	16	1	129	106
Wisconsin	24	6	18	0	0	0	0	18	54	92	36	13	23	0	94	126
Championship: March 18, 2023 † indicates conference regular season champion * indicates conference tournament champion Rankings: USCHO.com Top 20 Poll

== Bracket ==
Teams were reseeded for the semifinals

Quarterfinals; March 3–5
2	Michigan	6*	7	—
7	Wisconsin	5	4	—
3	Ohio State	5	1	3
6	Penn State	1	2*	1
4	Notre Dame	1	2	2
5	Michigan State	0	4	4

Semifinals; March 11
1	Minnesota	5
5	Michigan State	1
2	Michigan	7
3	Ohio State	3

Championship; March 18
1	Minnesota	3
2	Michigan	4

Note: * denotes overtime periods.

== Results ==
=== Quarterfinals ===
==== (2) Michigan vs. (7) Wisconsin ====
March 3	Wisconsin	5 – 6	OT	Michigan	Yost Ice Arena	Recap
Sam Stange – (Tyson Jugnauth) – 13:02; Mathieu De St. Phalle – (Sam Stange, Ben Dexheimer) – 11:42		First period		18:31 – Mackie Samoskevich – (Dylan Duke, Seamus Casey)
Mathieu De St. Phalle – (Brock Caufield, Corson Ceulemans) – pp – 3:16		Second period		9:38 – Seamus Casey – (T.J. Hughes, Dylan Duke); 8:34 – Adam Fantilli – (Gavin Brindley, Seamus Casey); 0:18 – pp – Adam Fantilli – (Luke Hughes, Gavin Brindley)
Mathieu De St. Phalle – (Cruz Lucius) – 13:40; Dominick Mersch – (Zach Urdahl) – 13:21		Third period		0:23 – Mackie Samoskevich – (Luke Hughes, Adam Fantilli)
No scoring		First overtime period		10:54 – Steven Holtz – (Rutger McGroarty, Jay Keranen)
Kyle McClellan (30 saves / 36 shots)		Goalie stats		Erik Portillo (38 saves / 43 shots)

March 4	Wisconsin	4 – 7	Michigan	Yost Ice Arena	Recap
Cruz Lucius – (Mathieu De St. Phalle, Corson Ceulemans) – pp – 9:11		First period	11:53 – Rutger McGroarty – (Mackie Samoskevich, Adam Fantilli); 6:17 – pp – Adam Fantilli – (Luke Hughes, Gavin Brindley); 1:02 – Adam Fantilli – (Steven Holtz, Jay Keranen)
Mathieu De St. Phalle – (Cruz Lucius, Dominick Mersch) – 1:03; Mathieu De St. Phalle – (Brock Caufield, Carson Bantle) – 6:09		Second period	19:29 – Adam Fantilli – (Rutger McGroarty, Keaton Pehrson)
Carson Bantle – (Brock Caufield, Tyson Jugnauth) – 16:51		Third period	2:20 – Nolan Moyle – (Frank Nazar, Dylan Duke); 1:27 – T.J. Hughes – (Luke Hughes); 0:54 – Mackie Samoskevich – (Unassisted)
Kyle McClellan (36 saves / 43 shots)		Goalie stats	Erik Portillo (36 saves / 40 shots)

Michigan won series 2–0

==== (3) Ohio State vs. (6) Penn State ====
March 3	Penn State	1 – 5	Ohio State	Value City Arena	Recap
No scoring		First period	4:31 – Davis Burnside – (Stephen Halliday, Dominic Vidoli)
Ture Linden – (Ashton Calder, Jimmy Dowd, Jr.) – pp – 11:00		Second period	4:34 – Tyler Duke – (Tate Singleton, Stephen Halliday); 5:18 – Cam Thiesing – (Mason Lohrei); 13:58 – pp – Cole McWard – (Jake Wise, Stephen Halliday)
No scoring		Third period	12:02 – Stephen Halliday – (Unassisted)
Liam Soulière (34 saves / 39 shots)		Goalie stats	Jakub Dobeš (33 saves / 34 shots)

March 4	Penn State	2 – 1	OT	Ohio State	Value City Arena	Recap
No scoring		First period		No scoring
No scoring		Second period		No scoring
Ryan Kirwan – (Xander Lamppa) – 16:03		Third period		18:26 – Joe Dunlap – (Tyler Duke, Jake Wise)
Kevin Wall – (Connor MacEachern, Dylan Gratton) – 10:35		First overtime period		No scoring
Liam Soulière (55 saves / 56 shots)		Goalie stats		Jakub Dobeš (30 saves / 32 shots)

March 5	Penn State	1 – 3	Ohio State	Value City Arena	Recap
No scoring		First period	No scoring
Kevin Wall – (Connor McMenamin, Dylan Gratton) – 6:28		Second period	12:08 – pp – Cole McWard – (Stephen Halliday, Jake Wise); 15:45 – Scooter Brickey – (Dominic Vidoli)
No scoring		Third period	18:17 – Tate Singleton – (Mason Lohrei)
Liam Soulière (22 saves / 24 shots)		Goalie stats	Jakub Dobeš (30 saves / 31 shots)

Ohio State won series 2–1

==== (4) Notre Dame vs. (5) Michigan State ====
March 3	Michigan State	0 – 1	Notre Dame	Compton Family Ice Arena	Recap
No scoring		First period	No scoring
No scoring		Second period	3:47 – Grant Silianoff – (Trevor Janicke, Jack Adams)
No scoring		Third period	No scoring
Dylan St. Cyr (20 saves / 21 shots)		Goalie stats	Ryan Bischel (36 saves / 36 shots)

March 4	Michigan State	4 – 2	Notre Dame	Compton Family Ice Arena	Recap
No scoring		First period	17:13 – Solag Bakich – (Trevor Janicke, Ben Brinkman)
Jeremy Davidson – (Nicolas Muller, David Gucciardi) – pp – 8:38; Matt Basgall – (Tiernan Shoudy, Daniel Russell) – 16:37		Second period	No scoring
Nash Nienhuis – (Jeremy Davidson, Nicolas Muller) – 3:27; Karsen Dorwart – (Daniel Russell, Jagger Joshua) – 5:34		Third period	13:34 – pp – Jack Adams – (Drew Bavaro, Hunter Strand)
Dylan St. Cyr (31 saves / 33 shots)		Goalie stats	Ryan Bischel (28 saves / 32 shots)

March 5	Michigan State	4 – 2	Notre Dame	Compton Family Ice Arena	Recap
Nicolas Muller – (Erik Middendorf, Jeremy Davidson) – 8:33		First period	15:05 – pp – Justin Janicke – (Landon Slaggert, Chayse Primeau)
Jeremy Davidson – (Nicolas Muller) – 8:59		Second period	No scoring
Tiernan Shoudy – (Nash Nienhuis, Miroslav Mucha) – 13:18; Nicolas Muller – (Unassisted) – en – 1:43		Third period	3:23 – pp – Hunter Strand – (Solag Bakich, Nick Leivermann)
Dylan St. Cyr (37 saves / 39 shots)		Goalie stats	Ryan Bischel (24 saves / 27 shots)

Michigan State won series 2–1

=== Semifinals ===
==== (1) Minnesota vs. (5) Michigan State ====
March 11	Michigan State	1 – 5	Minnesota	3M Arena at Mariucci	Recap
Jeremy Davidson – (Miroslav Mucha, Nash Nienhuis) – pp – 15:13		First period	6:21 – pp – Jaxon Nelson – (Matthew Knies, Mike Koster); 2:09 – John Mittelstadt – (Ryan Chesley, Ryan Johnson)
No scoring		Second period	18:00 – Aaron Huglen – (Cal Thomas, Rhett Pitlick)
No scoring		Third period	11:36 – Logan Cooley – (Brock Faber, Mike Koster); 4:01 – en – Logan Cooley – (Jimmy Snuggerud, Ryan Chesley)
Dylan St. Cyr (19 saves / 23 shots)		Goalie stats	Justen Close (29 saves / 30 shots)

==== (2) Michigan vs. (3) Ohio State ====
March 11	Ohio State	3 – 7	Michigan	Yost Ice Arena	Recap
No scoring		First period	19:37 – Gavin Brindley – (Adam Fantilli, Luke Hughes); 15:12 – Seamus Casey – (Ethan Edwards); 9:33 – Mackie Samoskevich – (Keaton Pehrson, Luke Hughes)
Jake Wise – (Travis Treloar, Cole McWard) – pp – 8:17		Second period	2:55 – Adam Fantilli – (Rutger McGroarty, Gavin Brindley)
Travis Treloar – (Mason Lohrei) – pp – 18:28; Cam Thiesing – (Stephen Halliday, Jake Wise) – 4:26		Third period	13:40 – Jackson Hallum – (Frank Nazar); 2:50 – en – Adam Fantilli – (Keaton Pehrson); 1:14 – en – Rutger McGroarty – (Adam Fantilli)
Jakub Dobeš (38 saves / 43 shots)		Goalie stats	Erik Portillo (35 saves / 38 shots)

=== Championship ===
==== (1) Minnesota vs. (2) Michigan ====
March 18	Michigan	4 – 3	Minnesota	3M Arena at Mariucci	Recap
No scoring		First period	13:08 – Brody Lamb – (Logan Cooley)
Rutger McGroarty – (Ethan Edwards, Gavin Brindley) – 16:48; Rutger McGroarty – (Keaton Pehrson, Adam Fantilli) – 16:14		Second period	9:11 – Logan Cooley – (Jimmy Snuggerud, Matthew Knies)
Seamus Casey – (Gavin Brindley, Rutger McGroarty) – 14:30; Dylan Duke – (T.J. Hughes, Gavin Brindley) – 8:14		Third period	18:03 – Rhett Pitlick – (Bryce Brodzinski, Jackson LaCombe)
Erik Portillo (22 saves / 25 shots)		Goalie stats	Justen Close (27 saves / 31 shots)

== Tournament awards ==
=== All-Tournament Team ===
- G: Justen Close (Minnesota)
- D: Seamus Casey (Michigan)
- D: Luke Hughes (Michigan)
- F: Logan Cooley (Minnesota)
- F: Adam Fantilli * (Michigan)
- F: Rutger McGroarty (Michigan)

* Most Outstanding Player
