= Big Ten Men's Ice Hockey Tournament Most Outstanding Player =

Big Ten Tournament Most Outstanding Player
- Sport: Ice hockey
- Awarded for: The Most Outstanding Player in the Big Ten Conference Tournament

History
- First award: 2014
- Most recent: T. J. Hughes

The Big Ten Tournament Most Outstanding Player is an annual award given out at the conclusion of the Big Ten Conference Tournament to the best player in the championship as voted by a media panel and the head coaches of each team.

The Most Outstanding Player was first awarded in 2014 and is a successor to the CCHA Most Valuable Player in Tournament which was discontinued after the conference dissolved due to the 2013–14 NCAA conference realignment.

== Award winners ==
Year	Winner	Position	School
2014	Mark Zengerle	Center	Wisconsin
2015	Adam Wilcox	Goaltender	Minnesota
2016	Kyle Connor	Left wing	Michigan
2017	Peyton Jones	Goaltender	Penn State
2018	Cale Morris	Goaltender	Notre Dame
2019	Cale Morris	Goaltender	Notre Dame
2020	Not awarded due to the COVID-19 pandemic		
2021	Jack LaFontaine	Goaltender	Minnesota
2022	Erik Portillo	Goaltender	Michigan
2023	Adam Fantilli	Center	Michigan
2024	Trey Augustine	Goaltender	Michigan State
2025	Isaac Howard	Left wing	Michigan State
2026	T. J. Hughes	Center	Michigan

=== Winners by school ===
School	Winners
Michigan	4
Michigan State	2
Minnesota	2
Notre Dame	2
Penn State	1
Wisconsin	1

=== Winners by position ===
Position	Winners
Goaltender	7
Center	3
Right wing	0
Left wing	2
Forward	0
Defenceman	0
