= Adam Fantilli =

Canadian ice hockey player (born 2004)

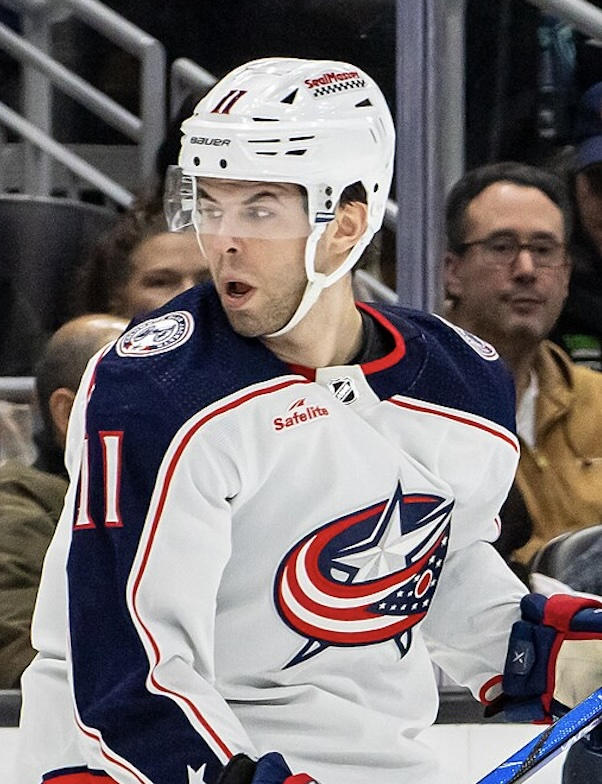
- Fantilli with the Columbus Blue Jackets in 2024
- Born: October 12, 2004 (age 22) Nobleton, Ontario, Canada
- Height: 6 ft 2 in (188 cm)
- Weight: 205 lb (93 kg; 14 st 9 lb)
- Position: Centre
- Shoots: Left
- NHL team: Columbus Blue Jackets
- National team: Canada
- NHL draft: 3rd overall, 2023; Columbus Blue Jackets
- Playing career: 2023–present

Adamo Giuliano Fantilli (born October 12, 2004) is a Canadian professional ice hockey player who is a centre for the Columbus Blue Jackets of the National Hockey League (NHL). He was drafted third overall by the Blue Jackets in the 2023 NHL entry draft. During his freshman season at the University of Michigan he was the leading goal and point-scorer and won the Hobey Baker Award, becoming the third freshman to win the award, after Paul Kariya in 1993 and Jack Eichel in 2015.

== Playing career ==
=== Early years ===
Fantilli was drafted in the first round, 18th overall, by the Saginaw Spirit in the 2020 OHL Priority Selection Draft. He was considered the top Canadian prospect in the draft, however, he had already committed to play for the Chicago Steel. On September 13, 2021, the Spirit exercised their defected player rule and traded Fantilli's OHL playing rights to the North Bay Battalion. Saginaw received a first-round pick, 19th overall, in the 2022 draft, one spot after the player was originally drafted, as compensation for the player failing to report to the team. They would have also received four conditional picks if Fantilli had ever played in the OHL.

Fantilli attended Kimball Union Academy where he recorded 18 goals and 18 assists in 25 games. On March 25, 2020, Fantilli signed a USHL tender agreement with the Chicago Steel for the 2020–21 season. During the regular season he recorded 18 goals and 18 assists in 49 games for the Steel and was named to the USHL All-Rookie Second Team. During the Clark Cup playoffs, he recorded eight goals and one assist in eight games to help lead his team to the Anderson Cup and Clark Cup. He was subsequently named the Clark Cup Playoffs MVP. During the 2021–22 season, he led the team in scoring and recorded 37 goals and 37 assists in 54 games. His 37 goals were the second-most in a single season in program history. His 74 points tied him with Kyle Connor for the most points by a player in their draft-minus-one season in USHL history. Following the season he was named to the All-USHL First Team.

=== Collegiate ===
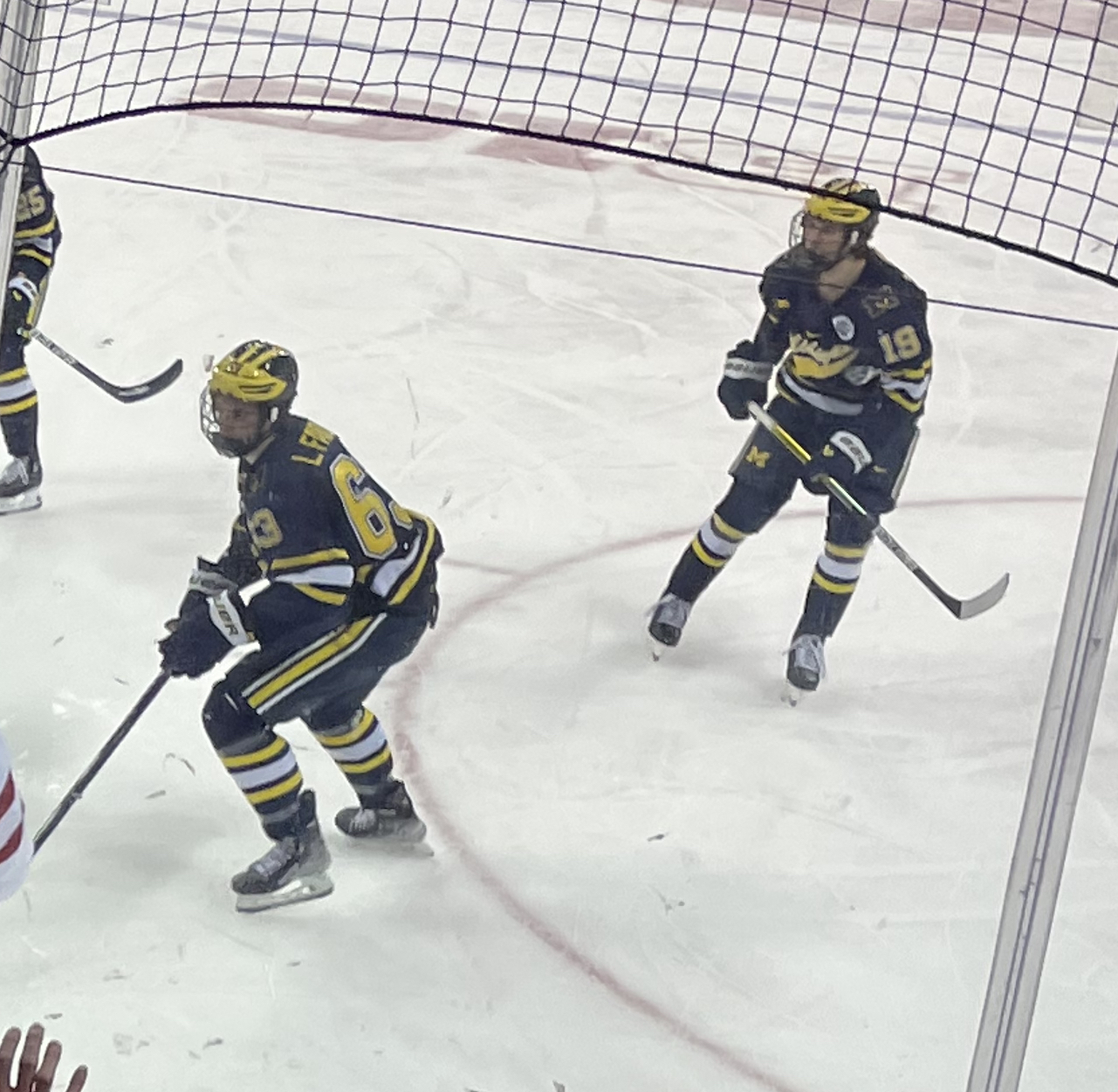
Fantilli (right) playing for Michigan alongside his brother Luca (left) in a December 2, 2022 game against the Wisconsin Badgers at the Kohl Center in Madison, Wisconsin

In August 2021, Fantilli verbally committed to the University of Michigan. He began his collegiate career for the Michigan Wolverines during the 2022–23 season. He made his debut for Michigan on October 7, 2022, in a game against Lindenwood, where he won 15 of 19 faceoffs and recorded two assists. The next day, he scored his first career collegiate goal in a victory over Lindenwood. On October 21, he scored his first career hat-trick in a game against Lake Superior State. The next day, he scored a career-high four points with one goal and three assists, in a victory over Lake Superior State. He was subsequently named the Big Ten First Star of the Week for the week ending October 24, after he recorded seven points during the weekend series. With 15 points over his first six games, he recorded the best start in program history since Bruno Baseotto had 19 points in his first six games in 1979. He was named the Hockey Commissioners Association Men's Player of the Month and Rookie of the Month for the month of October. In eight games, he recorded eight goals and 10 assists for 18 points. He recorded at least one point in every game. He was named the Hockey Commissioners Association Men's Player of the Month for the month of January. In six games, he recorded five goals and nine assists for 14 points, and led the NCAA with 2.33 points per game. On February 24, 2023, Fantilli recorded his 50th point of the season, becoming the first player in the nation to reach the milestone. He became the first Wolverine player to record 50 points in a season since Cooper Marody had 51 points during the 2017–18 season. During the regular season he recorded 11 goals and 19 assists in 19 conference games for a league-best 1.58 points per game. Following an outstanding season, he was named to the All-Big Ten Freshman Team, the All-Big Ten First Team and was named Big Ten Freshman of the Year.

During the 2023 Big Ten men's ice hockey tournament he set the Big Ten tournament record for goals in a single tournament with seven and in points with 11. He was subsequently named the Big Ten Tournament MVP. He finished his freshman year with 30 goals and 35 assists in 36 games. He led the nation in points, and goals, averaging 1.81 points-per-game, 0.83 goals-per-game and 0.98 assists-per-game. His 1.81 points-per-game average was the third-highest scoring mark behind only Johnny Gaudreau (2.00) and Kyle Connor (1.87). Following an outstanding season he was awarded the Tim Taylor Award, Hobey Baker Award and was named an AHCA West First Team All-American. He became the third freshman to win the Hobey Baker Award, after Paul Kariya in 1993 and Jack Eichel in 2015.

=== Professional ===
Fantilli was drafted third overall by the Columbus Blue Jackets in the 2023 NHL entry draft. On July 1, 2023, Fantilli signed a three-year entry-level contract with the Blue Jackets, forgoing the remainder of his college career.

Fantilli made his NHL debut on October 12, 2023, his 19th birthday, against the Philadelphia Flyers. He scored his first career NHL goal on October 21, 2023, as part of a 5–4 overtime win against the Minnesota Wild. During the 2023–24 season, as a rookie, he recorded 12 goals and 15 assists in 49 games, before suffering a season-ending calf laceration on January 28, 2024, in a game against the Seattle Kraken.

On January 22, 2025, Fantilli scored his first NHL hat-trick in a game against the Toronto Maple Leafs. Fantilli who grew up about 40 minutes north of Toronto, had 70 family and friends in attendance for the game. His mother was the first person to throw her hat onto the ice following his hat-trick.

On September 24, 2026, Fantilli signed a six-year contract extension with the Blue Jackets.

== International play ==
Medal record

Men's ice hockey

Representing Canada

World Championships
Gold medal – first place	2023 Finland/Latvia	

World Junior Championships
Gold medal – first place	2023 Canada	

Winter Youth Olympics
Bronze medal – third place	2020 Lausanne	

Fantilli was part of the Canadian boys' team at the 2020 Winter Youth Olympics where he served as alternate captain. During the tournament he recorded two goals and one assist in four games and won a bronze medal.

In 2022, Fantilli was named to Canada's national under-18 team at the 2022 IIHF World U18 Championships, where he again served as alternate captain. He recorded one goal and five assists in four games before the team was knocked out in the quarterfinal stage. On December 12, 2022, he was named to Canada's national junior team at the 2023 World Junior Ice Hockey Championships. During the tournament he recorded two goals and three assists in seven games, and won a gold medal.

On May 5, 2023, Fantilli was named to Canada's senior national team at the 2023 IIHF World Championship. He scored the game-winning goal in the semi-final against Latvia, his first of the tournament. He finished the tournament with one goal and two assists and won a gold medal. He became the second Canadian to win gold at both the World Juniors and World Championship in the same year, after Jonathan Toews, and the 11th player to do so in the world. He was subsequently nominated for the inaugural IIHF Male Player of the Year award.

After missing the final months of the 2023–24 season with injury, Fantilli rejoined the senior national team for the 2024 IIHF World Championship. Citing his shortened professional season as a motive for competing, he said: "I have to get my game going. That's my concern." However, Fantilli was subsequently dropped from the roster in advance of the tournament, with the addition of a number of more experienced NHL players whose teams were ousted in the first round of the playoffs.

== Personal life ==
Fantilli is the son of Giuliano and Julia Fantilli. His brother, Luca, also plays college ice hockey at Michigan. Fantilli is of Polish descent on his mother's side, and of Italian descent on his father's side

== Career statistics ==
=== Regular season and playoffs ===
			Regular season					Playoffs
Season	Team	League	GP	G	A	Pts	PIM	GP	G	A	Pts	PIM
2020–21	Chicago Steel	USHL	49	18	18	36	22	8	8	1	9	2
2021–22	Chicago Steel	USHL	54	37	37	74	93	3	0	1	1	2
2022–23	University of Michigan	B1G	36	30	35	65	67	—	—	—	—	—
2023–24	Columbus Blue Jackets	NHL	49	12	15	27	16	—	—	—	—	—
2024–25	Columbus Blue Jackets	NHL	82	31	23	54	18	—	—	—	—	—
2025–26	Columbus Blue Jackets	NHL	82	24	35	59	38	—	—	—	—	—
NHL totals			213	67	73	140	72	—	—	—	—	—

=== International ===
Year	Team	Event	Result	GP	G	A	Pts	PIM
2022	Canada	U18	5th	4	1	5	6	0
2023	Canada	WJC	1st place, gold medalist(s)	7	2	3	5	4
2023	Canada	WC	1st place, gold medalist(s)	10	1	2	3	29
2025	Canada	WC	5th	8	0	0	0	0
Junior totals				11	3	8	11	4
Senior totals				18	1	2	3	29

== Awards and honours ==
Award	Year
College
Big Ten Freshman of the Year	2023
All-Big Ten First Team	2023
All-Big Ten Freshman Team	2023
Big Ten All-Tournament Team	2023
Big Ten Tournament MVP	2023
Tim Taylor Award	2023
Hobey Baker Award	2023
AHCA West First Team All-American	2023

== See also ==
- Canadian national men's ice hockey team
- NHL entry draft

Awards and achievements
Preceded by Jakub Dobeš / Luke Hughes	Big Ten Freshman of the Year; 2022–23	Succeeded by Artyom Levshunov
Preceded by Devon Levi	Tim Taylor Award; 2022–23	Succeeded by Macklin Celebrini
Preceded by Dryden McKay	Hobey Baker Award; 2022–23	Succeeded by Macklin Celebrini
Preceded by Bobby Brink	NCAA Ice Hockey Scoring Champion; 2022–23	Succeeded by Will Smith
Preceded by Denton Mateychuk	Columbus Blue Jackets first-round draft pick 2023	Succeeded by Cayden Lindstrom
