= 2024–25 Big Ten Conference ice hockey season =

- Season: 2024–25
- Conference: Big Ten Conference
- Division: Division I
- Sport: ice hockey
- Duration: October 4, 2024– April 10, 2025
- Number of teams: 7
- TV partner(s): Big Ten Network

NHL Entry Draft
- Top draft pick: Logan Hensler
- Picked by: Ottawa Senators

Regular Season
- Season champions: Michigan State; Minnesota

Big Ten Tournament
- Tournament champions: Michigan State
- Runners-up: Ohio State
- Tournament MVP: Isaac Howard

NCAA Tournament
- Bids: 4
- Record: 2–4
- Best Finish: National Semifinal
- Team(s): Michigan State; Minnesota; Ohio State; Penn State

The 2024–25 Big Ten men's ice hockey season was the 35th season of play for the Big Ten Conference's men's ice hockey division and will take place during the 2024–25 NCAA Division I men's ice hockey season. The season began on October 4, 2024, and concluded on April 10, 2025 with Penn State's loss in the national semifinal.

== Head coaches ==
=== Records ===
Team	Head coach	Season at school	Record at school	Big Ten record
Michigan	Brandon Naurato	3	49–27–6	23–21–4
Michigan State	Adam Nightingale	3	43–28–5	26–18–4
Minnesota	Bob Motzko	7	136–71–17	86–41–15
Notre Dame	Jeff Jackson	20	407–266–73	85–66–15
Ohio State	Steve Rohlik	12	197–163–43	94–105–22
Penn State	Guy Gadowsky	14	196–172–28	95–117–19
Wisconsin	Mike Hastings	2	26–12–2	16–7–1

== Preseason ==
Big Ten conference standings were selected by conference head coaches on September 20, 2024.

=== Preseason Big Ten poll ===
Rank	Team
1	Michigan State
2	Minnesota
3	Michigan
4	Wisconsin
5	Notre Dame
6	Penn State
7	Ohio State

=== Preseason All-Big Ten ===
All-Big Ten Teams
First Team	Position	Second Team
Trey Augustine, Michigan State	G	Tommy Scarfone, Wisconsin
Ben Dexheimer, Wisconsin	D	Mike Koster, Minnesota
Sam Rinzel, Minnesota	D	Jacob Truscott, Michigan
Karsen Dorwart, Michigan State	F	Aiden Fink, Penn State
Isaac Howard, Michigan State	F	T. J. Hughes, Michigan
Jimmy Snuggerud, Minnesota	F	Matthew Wood, Minnesota

== Standings ==
2024–25 Big Ten ice hockey Standings
	Conference record										Overall record					
	GP	W	L	T	OTW	OTL	3/SW	PTS	GF	GA	GP	W	L	T	GF	GA
#6 Michigan State †*	24	15	5	4	2	1	2	50	92	60	37	26	7	4	129	77
#9 Minnesota †	24	15	6	3	1	3	0	50	87	62	40	25	11	4	154	101
#11 Ohio State	24	14	9	1	3	2	0	42	72	62	40	24	14	2	127	106
#17 Michigan	24	12	10	2	5	1	2	36	76	83	36	18	15	3	112	118
#5 Penn State	24	9	11	4	2	1	3	33	78	88	40	22	14	4	139	120
Wisconsin	24	7	16	1	1	6	0	27	64	77	37	13	21	3	108	110
Notre Dame	24	4	19	1	2	2	1	14	60	97	38	12	25	1	102	127
Championship: March 22, 2025 † indicates conference regular season champion * indicates conference tournament champion Rankings: USCHO.com Top 20 Poll

== Non-Conference record ==
The Big Ten finished the year with an outstanding non-conference record. Not only did each of the member teams finish with a winning record in out of conference games, the Big Ten as a whole had winning records against every other conference.

=== Regular season record ===
Team	AHA	CCHA	ECAC Hockey	Hockey East	Independent	NCHC	Total
Michigan	0–0–0	1–1–0	0–0–0	2–0–0	0–0–0	3–2–1	6–3–1
Michigan State	2–0–0	3–0–0	0–0–0	1–1–0	2–0–0	1–0–0	9–1–0
Minnesota	3–0–0	3–1–0	0–0–0	0–0–0	1–0–1	2–1–0	9–2–1
Notre Dame	0–0–0	0–0–0	3–0–0	0–1–0	3–3–0	0–0–0	6–4–0
Ohio State	1–0–1	4–0–0	0–2–0	0–0–0	2–0–0	0–0–0	7–2–1
Penn State	3–0–0	0–0–0	4–1–0	0–0–0	2–0–0	0–0–0	9–1–0
Wisconsin	0–0–0	1–0–0	0–0–0	1–0–0	3–1–2	0–2–0	5–3–2
Overall	9–0–1	12–2–0	7–3–0	4–2–0	13–4–3	6–5–1	51–16–5

== Statistics ==
=== Leading Scorers ===
GP = Games played; G = Goals; A = Assists; Pts = Points; PIM = Penalties in minutes

Player	Class	Team	GP	G	A	Pts	PIM
Isaac Howard	Junior	Michigan State	24	16	17	33	6
Jimmy Snuggerud	Junior	Minnesota	24	19	13	32	25
Aiden Fink	Sophomore	Penn State	24	17	14	31	8
T. J. Hughes	Junior	Michigan	24	15	15	30	6
Michael Hage	Freshman	Michigan	22	8	16	24	19
Gunnarwolfe Fontaine	Graduate	Ohio State	24	9	14	23	0
Karsen Dorwart	Junior	Michigan State	24	10	12	22	10
Charlie Cerrato	Freshman	Penn State	22	11	11	22	31
Cole Knuble	Sophomore	Notre Dame	21	5	17	22	10
Oliver Moore	Sophomore	Minnesota	24	8	13	21	6
Reese Laubach	Sophomore	Penn State	22	10	11	21	55

=== Leading Goaltenders ===
Minimum 1/3 of team's minutes played in conference games.
GP = Games played; Min = Minutes played; W = Wins; L = Losses; T = Ties; GA = Goals against; SO = Shutouts; SV% = Save percentage; GAA = Goals against average

Player	Class	Team	GP	Min	W	L	T	GA	SO	SV%	GAA
Logan Terness	Senior	Ohio State	13	751:02	6	6	0	27	0	.934	2.16
Liam Soulière	Graduate	Minnesota	17	964:38	9	4	2	37	2	.922	2.30
Trey Augustine	Sophomore	Michigan State	21	1275:28	12	5	4	49	0	.919	2.31
Kristoffer Eberly	Sophomore	Ohio State	12	696:56	8	3	1	29	1	.912	2.50
Nathan Airey	Sophomore	Minnesota	9	499:51	6	2	1	23	1	.901	2.76

== Ranking ==
=== USCHO ===
Team	Pre	1	2	3	4	5	6	7	8	9	10	11	13	14	15	16	17	18	19	20	21	22	23	24	25	Final
Michigan	7	10	10	10	11	7	5	5	6	6	8	9	9	9	10	10	13	13	12	10	11	11	16	16	17	17
Michigan State	4	4	4	4	3	4	4	2	1	1	3	1	1	1	1	2	2	2	2	1	3	2	2	1	1	6
Minnesota	6	5	6	5	4	3	3	4	3	4	1	3	3	3	3	4	4	3	4	5	2	3	5	5	5	9
Notre Dame	19	20	18	17	19	20	NR	NR	NR	NR	NR	NR	NR	NR	NR	NR	NR	NR	NR	NR	NR	NR	NR	NR	NR	NR
Ohio State	NR	NR	NR	19	15	13	14	14	12	17	15	14	13	11	8	9	11	9	8	7	8	9	10	9	9	11
Penn State	NR	NR	NR	NR	18	19	18	NR	NR	NR	NR	NR	NR	NR	NR	NR	NR	NR	18	18	15	15	11	13	12	5
Wisconsin	10	9	16	20	NR	NR	NR	NR	NR	NR	NR	NR	NR	NR	NR	NR	17	19	NR	NR	NR	NR	NR	NR	NR	NR

=== USA Hockey ===
Team	Pre	1	2	3	4	5	6	7	8	9	10	11	13	14	15	16	17	18	19	20	21	22	23	24	25	26	Final
Michigan	8	13	9	11	11	7	6	5	6	6	8	8	9	9	10	10	12	13	12	11	11	11	15	16	17	17	17
Michigan State	4	4	4	4	3	3	3	2	1	1	3	1	1	1	1	2	2	2	2	1	3	2	2	1	1	6	6
Minnesota	5	5	6	5	4	3	3	4	4	4	1	3	3	3	3	3	4	3	3	4	2	3	4	5	5	9	8
Notre Dame	19	18	18	17	20	NR	NR	NR	NR	NR	NR	NR	NR	NR	NR	NR	NR	NR	NR	NR	NR	NR	NR	NR	NR	NR	NR
Ohio State	NR	NR	NR	17	15	12	14	12	12	16	15	14	13	11	8	8	11	11	8	6	10	10	10	9	9	11	12
Penn State	NR	NR	20	20	18	19	18	NR	NR	NR	NR	NR	NR	NR	NR	NR	NR	NR	18	17	16	15	10	13	13	5	5
Wisconsin	10	9	15	NR	NR	NR	NR	NR	NR	NR	NR	NR	NR	NR	NR	NR	18	20	NR	NR	NR	NR	NR	NR	NR	NR	NR

=== Pairwise ===
Team	1	2	3	4	5	6	7	8	9	10	11	13	14	15	16	17	18	19	20	21	22	23	24	Final
Michigan	22	13	13	16	12	12	12	6	6	9	9	9	12	12	10	11	14	12	12	10	11	14	14	15
Michigan State	12	11	11	6	5	4	3	2	2	4	2	2	2	1	2	2	2	2	2	2	2	2	2	2
Minnesota	28	3	9	7	6	6	7	7	8	2	4	3	4	4	3	3	3	3	3	3	3	4	4	5
Notre Dame	28	6	35	23	23	24	27	42	36	36	34	36	40	38	36	40	40	44	45	42	45	38	38	38
Ohio State	28	47	20	8	7	10	11	11	16	12	12	11	9	9	10	11	11	7	6	10	9	10	9	10
Penn State	12	34	32	17	17	20	41	48	33	35	34	34	31	31	28	24	20	16	16	15	14	12	13	13
Wisconsin	28	54	57	55	54	45	37	41	42	31	25	22	23	19	17	16	17	22	26	28	29	29	28	28

Note: Teams ranked in the top-10 automatically qualify for the NCAA tournament. Teams ranked 11-16 can qualify based upon conference tournament results.

== Conference tournament ==
Quarterfinals; March 7–9
2	Minnesota	2	4	1
7	Notre Dame	3	2	4
(Teams are reseeded after the Quarterfinal round)
3	Ohio State	1	3*	3
6	Wisconsin	4	2	2
4	Michigan	5	2	—
5	Penn State	6*	5	—

Semifinals; March 15
1	Michigan State	1
7	Notre Dame	0
3	Ohio State	4*
5	Penn State	3

Championship; March 22
1	Michigan State	4**
3	Ohio State	3

Note: * denotes overtime periods.

== NCAA tournament ==
Note: All game times are local.

=== Regional semifinals ===
==== Allentown Region ====
March 28, 2025; 8:30 pm	(1) Maine	1–5 (1–3, 0–1, 0–1)	(4) Penn State	PPL Center; Attendance: 7,358

Game reference

Albin Boija
Goalies
Arsenii Sergeev
Referees:
C. J. Hanafin
Cameron Lynch
Linesmen:
Patrick Dapuzzo
John Rey

(unassisted) Bodie Nobes (1) – 04:10	1–0
	1–1	05:04 – PP – J. J. Wiebusch (13) (Cerrato, Fink)
	1–2	14:26 – Matt DiMarsico (15) (Wiebusch, Cerrato)
	1–3	18:08 – PP – Dane Dowiak (10) (Dzhaniyev, Mack)
	1–4	25:41 – Matt DiMarsico (16) (Cerrato)
	1–5	56:37 – EN – Dane Dowiak (11) (unassisted)

10 min
Penalties
4 min
27
Shots
34

Game summary
The final game of the First Round began fast with both teams looking to prove themselves early. After a few rushes by both sides, the puck came to into the Maine zone about 2 minutes in. While no scoring chance occurred, Reese Laubach took a high crosscheck and crashed to the ice next to the net. After he skated off with an apparent injury, the Bears pushed the puck up the ice and established themselves in the zone. They got the puck to the front of the net and while the puck was slapped away by Keaton Peters, it deflected up into the air, arced over the shoulder of Arsenii Sergeev and landed in the net. The goal had a lengthy official review and determined that the hit on Laubach was not worthy of a major penalty and allowed the goal to stand. When play resumed, Penn State got right into the offensive zone and Albin Boija was forced to stop a pair of chances in quick succession. Just before the 50-minute mark, the PSU attack drew the game's first penalty when Thomas Freel was handed a boarding minor. Less than 10 seconds later, a cross crease pass gave J. J. Wiebusch a clear shot at a goal and he quickly tied the game. The fast pace continued after the goal and the teams alternated chances and both forechecked hard. Near the middle of the frame, Maine once again went a little over the line and Charlie Russell was handed a boarding penalty. The Nittany Lions carried the play in the early part of the man-advantage but Maine was able to keep them from scoring. In the second half of the penalty, Maine was able to get a glorious shorthanded chance but Owen Fowler's shot was deflected wide. A few seconds later, Charlie Cerrato was handed a boarding penalty and ended the PSU power play 30 seconds early. The brief 4-on-4 play saw both teams try to gain the upper hand but the defenses held. Once the Maine power play began, the Bears quickly got set up in the offensive zone but they had trouble getting the puck through to the net. Sergeev only had to make one save late and the Lions killed off the remainder of the time. Shortly afterwards, Taylor Makar rushed the puck deep into the Black Bears' end but he took a spill and crashed into the boards. Luckily, he got right back to his feet and looked to have escaped injury. With about 6 minutes to play, the referees missed what appeared to be a high-sticking penalty by Maine. Instead of complaining, Penn State skated right down the ice and got the puck to a streaking Matt DiMarsico. The forward fought off a hook from the defense and then fired the puck high into the far corner. On the return to action, Dylan Lugris was handed a minor for slashing to give Maine its second man-advantage. Furious work from both sides saw the Bears fire several shots on goal but in their zeal to keep the pressure on, Freel committed a hooking penalty on an attempted clear and it was Maine's turn to lose it power play early. The Lions spent most of their man-advantage struggling to find room but, just as it was winding down, Penn State fired the uck towards the net and the puck deflected in off of Dane Dowiak skate. Maine challenged the play for offsides but the officials allowed the goal to stand. Once play resumed the speed increased, if anything. Both teams played hard until the horn sounded but it was Penn State that carried the balance of play.

The second period began with Maine skating fast and trying to break into the Penn State zone while the Nittany Lions countered with a more reserved attack. PSU was content to wait for their opportunities and they were rewarded with a breakaway just two minutes in but Boija was able to stop Aiden Fink with his glove. The Black Bears shook off the near-miss and continued to pressure Penn State but were unable to find the net. Just past the 5-minute mark, David Breazeale threw a blind pass behind his own net but the only one in the area was Charlie Cerrato. The Lion forward found DiMarsico in front of the net and the sophomore made no mistake, burying his second of the night into the top corner. With a 3-goal lead now, Penn State had little reason to go away from their defense-first game even with half of the match still to be played. Despite Maine pressing hard in the offensive zone, the Lions counterattack was getting the better chances and Boija had to work just to keep his team in the match. Maine was almost able to get one back with about 7 minutes to play when the puck bounced out of Sergeev's glove but it slid past the outside of the post. Physical play afterwards saw both teams throwing the body around and Dowiak was slow to get up. Shortly after, Cerrato crashed into Boija, hitting the goaltender high and nocking his head into the post. After an injury stoppage, the Swede was able to continue. Neither team shied away from contact as Manie tried to force their way into the Penn State end but the Nittany Lions would not oblige. PSU's patience continued to be rewarded with the best chances and Cerrato was inches away from finding a goal with 2 minutes to play but the angle on his shot was just a little off. The final moments passed by with little effect and had Penn State up by three going into the final period.

Almost as soon as the players got back onto the ice the hitting resumed. Early on, Maine was finally able to establish some offensive zone time and on their second entry they were able to get some scoring chances on goal. Penn State nearly countered with a 2-on-0 but the puck ended up rolling into the corner. Past the 5-minute mark, Bodie Nobes crashed into his own net, taking out Boija and Fink in the process, but no one was injured on the play. As time ticked away, Maine's chances at getting back into the game became increasingly remote. As the period progressed, Penn State seemed to be getting stronger and didn't allow Maine to stay in their zone for long. Near the middle of the period, Nicholas DeGraves got the puck right in the slot in front of the Maine net. His shot went wide but concurrent with the chance he was hit hard by Makar and crashed to the ice in pain. Despite protests from the Penn State bench, no penalty was called on the play. Maine began upping their offensive pressure and was able to get the puck deep into the PSU zone but the Nittany Lions' defense blocked a pair of opportunities. About a minute later, Josh Nadeau took a slashing penalty, costing Maine vital time that they could ill afford. However, just like Penn State had earlier, Maine was able to get a few solid shorthanded chances on Sergeev As they were going for a third scoring chance, Harrison Scott was called for crosschecking and put Maine on the defensive for another 2 minutes. Boija was forced to make several stellar saves during the extended power play but did not allow the Lions to score. Back at even strength, Maine had just 6 minutes remaining to find 3 goals but still found it difficult to fight through the Penn State defense. After forcing an offensive zone draw, Boija was pulled for an extra attacker giving the Bears 6 skaters with just over 4 minutes to play. However, despite their best efforts, Penn State was able to turn over the puck and Dowiak was able to skate down the ice and deposit his second of the night into an open goal. The game calmed down a little after the marker but Maine continued to skate, refusing to knuckle under in spite of the score. The final minutes were completed without too many fireworks and ended with Penn State as the clear victor.

==== Fargo Region ====
March 27, 2025; 8:45 pm	(2) Minnesota	4–5 (OT) (2–1, 1–0, 1–3, 0–1)	(3) Massachusetts	Scheels Arena; Attendance: 4,816

Game reference

Liam Soulière (out 48:44, in 52:07)
Nathan Airey (in 48:44, out 52:07)
Goalies
Michael Hrabal
Referees:
Joe Carusone
Jason Williams
Linesmen:
Ryan Knapp
Adam Wood

(Rinzel, Koster) Jimmy Snuggerud (23) – PP – 14:14	1–0
	1–1	14:34 – Larry Keenan (4) (Lautenbach, Dell'Elce)
(unassisted) Brody Lamb (17) – 18:49	2–1
(Clark, Wood) Connor Kurth (18) – 34:07	3–1
	3–2	47:14 – Aydar Suniev (19) (Jenčko, Ölvestad)
	3–3	48:49 – Daniel Jenčko (6) (Murray, Ločmelis)
	3–4	55:07 – Francesco Dell'elce (7) (Connors, Jo. Musa)
(Moore) Jimmy Snuggerud (24) – 56:24	4–4
	4–5	64:49 – GW – Aydar Suniev (20) (Ločmelis)

4 min
Penalties
4 min
29
Shots
37

Game summary
With the game beginning more than an hour later than expected due to the earlier match going into double overtime, the start was a bit disjointed as the two teams had to shake off the cobwebs. While Minnesota was also having to contend with the absence of a few players due to illness, it was the Gophers who took controlled the game early. The first good chance of the night came when Jimmy Snuggerud broke in on the UMass goal but Michael Hrabal was able to make the save. The Minutemen answered with one of the own a minute later when Cole O'Hara tried to slip around behind Liam Soulière but the puck rolled off of his stick before he could shoot into an open net. The offenses bogged down in the middle of the period but Minnesota was still able to keep the puck in the Massachusetts end for long stretches. With few scoring chances being generated, the players occupied themselves with some pushing and shoving. As the speed of the game increased UMass got a few good chances on goal but Bo Cosman got a little too aggressive on the forecheck and was called for interference. On the ensuing power play, Snuggerud was able to corral the puck near the front of the net and Lucas Mercuri was forced to take a hooking minor to stop a golden scoring chance. Right off of the next faceoff, Matthew Wood was called for a trip to end revert the 2-man advantage back to just 1. With a ton of open ice, Minnesota was able to set up in the Massachusetts end and Snuggerud blasted a 50-foot shot past Hrabal for the opening goal. Just seconds later, Larry Keenan fired a puck in on Soulière who misread the trajectory and ended up deflecting it up into the top corner. The game see-sawed after the two quick goals but both defenses were able to force long-distance shots. Near the end of the period, Minnesota was able to spend some time in the Minutemen end and force an offensive zone faceoff. After Kenny Connors fumbled the draw, Brody Lamb snagged the puck and wired it into the near corner over Hrabal's shoulder. The end of the period saw a little more rough play but not enough to draw a penalty.

The Gophers picked right up where they left off and a screened point shot from Luke Mittelstadt eluded Hrabal but hit the crossbar and bounced away harmlessly. Massachusetts countered and went on the attack which included a bit of physical play as well. A few long shots reached Soulière but he didn't have too much difficulty making the saves. The two teams then went back and forth for several minutes to no real effect but, around the 12-minute mark, Minnesota generated a few scoring chances. Neither found its mark and UMass was able to get back to its game. Hrabal was forced to make another couple of saves a few minutes later when Minnesota titled the ice once more. With around 8 minutes to play, the Gophers got another good opportunity at the UMass cage. A net front scramble was halted by the Minutemen defense and Hrabal pounced on a loose puck to end the threat. Massachusetts tried to reply with a close-in shot of its own but Lautenbach's chance never fully materialized. A few minutes later Minnesota was able to get into the UMass end and, after failing on its initial chance, moved the puck to an open Connor Kurth in front. The Gopher forward pulled the puck around Hrabal and deposited a backhand into the cage. Now down by two, Massachusetts fought back and upped their forechecking game. After Jack Musa stole the puck in the Gopher end, Cal Thomas slashed him in response and was sent off for 2 minutes. UMass was able to set up their power play in the back half of the man-advantage and nearly ended up scoring on a melee in the goal crease but Soulière managed to keep the puck out and preserve Minnesota's 2-goal lead. The waning seconds passed with more jostling and jawing but, again, no further penalties.

The third began with the physical play continuing but UMass swiftly got to its offensive game. A few minutes in, the Minutemen had a pair of glorious chances; the first was stopped by Soulière's glove and the second rolled off Aydar Suniev's stick before he could get the puck around the sprawling netminder. Massachusetts had no real choice but to open up the game offensively while Minnesota did its level best to prevent any further scoring. The increased pressure eventually ended up with Suniev getting a pass from below the goal line just off to the right of the net and then shooting the puck past Soulière to the left. The Gophers were unhappy about the goal because an apparent tripping penalty down low went uncalled by the refs and led directly to Massachusetts getting its hands on the biscuit. After the fans voice their displeasure over another potential UMass penalty, Massachusetts went back on the attack. After Minnesota was forced into an icing, Soulière went over to the Gopher bench with an equipment problem and Nathan Airey was forced to take over in goal. Right after the ensuing faceoff, Daniel Jenčko deflected the puck past Airey to tie the game. The partisan crowd was silenced by the stunning turn of events and the Minutemen tried to take advantage. Minnesota was soon able to collect itself and countered with two chances from Kurth in tight. As the game stopped for a TV timeout around the 8-minute mark, Soulière returned to the Gopher crease. The teams then began to exchange chances and UMass got a great chance with about 5 minutes to play but was unable to get the shot on goal. A moment later, a pass into the slot from Francesco Dell'Elce was deflected into the top corner of the Gopher cage off of Jimmy Clark's stick. Minnesota was now forced to restart its offence with just 5 minutes to play or their season was over. It took just over a minute for Snuggerud to grab the puck off of a faceoff, skate towards the center of the ice and fire the puck past three Minutemen to tie the match. The goal revitalized the Gophers who began to pressure UMass on both ends of the ice. Massachusetts, however, was undaunted and a hit into the boards by Keenan on Mason Nevers demonstrated as much. Neither team could find another goal before time expired so overtime was needed to settle the score.

Snuggerud tried to end the match early but his hard shot missed the net. Massachusetts then had a few chances of their own that failed to connect. When possession switched back to the Gophers, a shot from Kurth hit off the top of Hrabal's mask and stunned to netminder but he soon recovered and remained in the game. About a minute later the Minnesota faithful groaned when what they believed was an obvious tripping call was let go. The play helped UMass turn over the puck which was then skated up the ice and swiftly deposited into the goal for the winning tally. An angry buzz persisted through the building after the winner but Suniev's second of the night was allowed to stand as the deciding goal. A few objects were thrown onto the ice as the two teams shook hands while Bob Motzko, Minnesota's coach, was visibly angry at the referees.

==== Toledo Region ====
March 27, 2025; 5:30 pm	(1) Michigan State	3–4 (2–1, 1–1, 0–2)	(4) Cornell	Huntington Center; Attendance: 6,937

Game reference

Trey Augustine
Goalies
Ian Shane
Referees:
Geoff Miller
Terrance Murphy
Linesmen:
Bill Kingdon
Jeff McCorkle

(Larson, Dorwart) Gavin O'Connell (6) – 07:20	1–0
	1–1	15:02 – Ryan Walsh (15) (Robertson, Mack)
(Stramel, Howard) Daniel Russell (13) – PP – 19:31	2–1
	2–2	36:30 – Charlie Major (4) (Stanley)
(Štrbák, O'Connell) Karsen Dorwart (13) – 36:47	3–2
	3–3	52:38 – Ryan Walsh (16) (Robertson)
	3–4	59:50 – GW PP – Sullivan Mack (17) (Major, Fegaras)

2 min
Penalties
2 min
37
Shots
21

Game summary

March 27, 2025; 2:00 pm	(2) Boston University	8–3 (0–1, 3–2, 5–0)	(3) Ohio State	Huntington Center; Attendance: 6,907

Game reference

Mikhail Yegorov
Goalies
Logan Terness
Referees:
Nick Krebsbach
Brandon Schmitt
Linesmen:
Eric Frank
Chris Williams

	0–1	09:06 – Joe Dunlap (7) (Hansen-Bukata, Ja. Dunlap)
(Kaplan, Bednarik) Cole Eiserman (22) – 28:07	1–1
	1–2	32:50 – PP – Joe Dunlap (8) (Rozzi, Hansen-Bukata)
(C. Hutson, Greene) Quinn Hutson (22) – PP – 37:19	2–2
	2–3	37:49 – Max Montes (14) (Weis, Able)
(Hughes, Harvey) Matt Copponi (5) – 38:01	3–3
(Copponi, Willander) Aiden Celebrini (5) – GW – 42:18	4–3
(Greene, C. Hutson) Jack Hughes (6) – SH – 45:25	5–3
(C. Hutson) Cole Eiserman (23) – 48:07	6–3
(Hughes, Boumedienne) Jack Harvey (10) – 54:16	7–3
(unassisted) Cole Hutson (13) – SH EN – 59:30	8–3

24 min
Penalties
4 min
23
Shots
36

Game summary
The game began slowly with both teams trying to feel one another out. A few one-and-done chances were obtained but the first five minutes was dominated by turnovers from both sides. The first real chance of the game came when Riley Thompson skated through the BU defense at 4:20 but Mikhail Yegorov made the save. Ohio State was able to establish some zone time afterwards but they were kept to the outside and unable to generate a scoring chance. The game returned to being a sleepy affair until the middle of the period. After setting up in the Terriers' end the puck came to Aiden Hansen-Bukata at the point. The Buckeye defenseman fired a soft shot on goal that Yegorov stopped with his pad but the puck bounced right to the stick of Joe Dunlap who had a wide-open cage and did not miss for the game's opening goal. Less than a minute later, Quinn Hutson was whistled for a slashing call to give OSU a chance to increase their lead. Yegorov was called upon to make several stops during the kill but it was Gavin McCarthy who made the biggest save when he rescued a puck from the goal line after it had leaked through the BU goaltender. Ohio State remained in control of the action for several minutes after their man-advantage thanks in part to their early dominance on faceoffs. After Yegorov made another key save from in tight, Cole Hutson took his turn in the penalty box with a hooking minor. Ohio State moved the puck well on the power play but missed on a few of their passes. Yegorov was forced to make a few saves in the back half of the man-advantage but BU was able to get control of the rebounds and clear the puck out of danger. OSU kept the Terriers on their heels until they committed an icing and allowed the Terriers to get some breathing room. BU was finally able to get its second shot of the game shortly afterwards but by the end of the period they found themselves trailing Ohio State 2–15 in that department. The only bright spot in the entire period for BU was that OSU was called for a penalty at the end and the Terriers would begin the second with their first power play of the match.

After a slow start, Boston University was able to finally get its first real scoring chance on the power play but Logan Terness was equal to the task. Ohio State's 50th-ranked penalty kill was able to stymie the Terriers and retain their lead. However, the momentum began to shift and BU was able to finally establish some offensive zone time afterwards to try and even out the play. After another giveaway by BU around the 5-minute mark, Yegorov had to make another big save in tight, this time on Patrick Guzzo. The Terriers began to show of their offensive talent in the middle of the period but the OSU defense was able to block several shots. Right after winning an offensive draw, Cole Eiserman rifled a shot into the top corner of the net to tie the game. BU began to take over after their goal until Gunnarwolfe Fontaine broke in on the Terrier goal just after the midway point of the game. Yegorov made the save and the match began to see-saw between the two clubs. Before anything could happen, however, Devin Kaplan smacked one of the OSU players in the head with his forearm and was given a roughing minor. The bad penalty ended up costing BU as Joe Dunlap scored his second of the game off of the rush. BU got right back on the attack after the penalty but the Ohio State defense limited the Terriers to long shots on goal that Terness was able to stop. With just over 3 minutes in the period, Jake Dunlap was called for hooking. After a pretty bit of passing, the nation's #5 power play connected when a wide-open Quinn Hutson wired the puck in off of the goal post. Riding high off of their second goal, BU Gave up a 2-on-1 and allowed the Buckeyes to take a lead when Max Montes fired low-stick on Yegorov. Just 12 seconds later, Matt Copponi received a pass from behind the cage and smacked the puck past Terness to even the count once more. With the two teams doing their best to wear out the goal horn, Shane Lachance took a very ill-advised interference penalty and was nearly given a second for arguing with the referees. About a minute in, Thompson nearly made the Terriers pay a second time but couldn't get the proper angle on a deflected puck and missed a wide-open net. Just as time was expiring, Joe Dunlap scored what he believed was his third of the game but time had expired moments before the puck entered the net and the game remained tied.

After BU was able to salt away the remainder of the penalty at the start of the third, Lachance got a good chance on goal but Terness was able to stop his relatively weak shot. A few minutes later, Terness failed to stop another weak shot from Aiden Celebrini then slipped under his right arm. With their first lead of the game, BU remained on the attack but OSU countered and the two started skating up and down the ice, trying to break through the opposing defenses. By this point, the Terriers had begun to take over on the faceoff dot but the Buckeyes used their structure to take control of the puck and generate another good scoring chance. While Yegorov made the save, the Terriers took their fifth minor of the game immediately afterwards to give Ohio State a golden opportunity to tie the match once more. A few seconds into the man-advantage, the puck bounced right to the BU defenders on the blueline and Jack Hughes carried the puck up the ice on a 2-on-1. The BU forward shot the puck and it was deflected past Terness by an OSU stick to double the lead. About a minute later, Cole Hutson was almost scored on a second 2-on-1 shorthanded chance. Shortly after the penalty expired, Eiserman smacked the puck backhanded from behind the goal line. The puck hit Terness as he was hugging the post but it found a hole and dropped into the goal. With the complexion of the game completely changed, OSU had to now abandon its defensive structure in the hope of finding three goals in the final 12 minutes. This however, only served to feed into the BU offense and allowed the Terriers to continue firing the puck on the Ohio State goal. Just past the 10-minute mark, Eiserman nearly completed a hat-trick when he shot at a half-empty cage but the puck hit the right post and bounced out the other side. Afterwards, the Buckeyes began to press but Yegorov remained strong in goal and kept the puck out of the net. On a counterattack, Jack Harvey made a move around a Buckeye defender and found himself wide open in front of the net. He flipped the puck into the top corner to give BU a 4-goal lead with under 6 minutes to play. The rest of the game was a bit loose as both teams seemed to understand that the game was essentially over. The Buckeyes were a bit physical in the waning moments but it was the Terriers who were called for a penalty when Celebrini was given a minor for interference with about 2 minutes left on the clock. Devin Kaplan then received a 2- and a 10-minute for yelling at the referees. With a 2-man advantage, Terness was pulled to give the Buckeyes a fleeting chance to tie. However, with less than a minute to play, Cole Hutson got control of the puck, danced through two OSU defenders and scored into the empty net to essentially end the game.

=== Regional finals ===
==== Allentown Region ====
March 30, 2025; 4:30 pm	(2) Connecticut	2–3 (OT) (1–1, 1–1, 0–0, 1–0)	(4) Penn State	PPL Center; Attendance: 6,933

Game reference

Callum Tung
Goalies
Arsenii Sergeev
Referees:
Ryan Hersey
Nathan Wieler
Linesmen:
Eric Contino
Tyler Liffrig

(Richard, Schandor) Joey Muldowney (29) – 3:09	1–0
	1–1	13:27 – Dane Dowiak (12) (Paquette, Peters)
(Gustafsson Nyberg, Spetz) Tabor Heaslip (8) – 31:27	2–1
	2–2	31:57 – J. J. Wiebusch (14) (Cerrato, Mack)
	2–3	77:56 – GW – Matt DiMarsico (17) (Cerrato)

4 min
Penalties
4 min
44
Shots
41

Game summary

=== National semifinals ===
April 10, 2025; 7:30 pm	(T2) Boston University	3–1 (0–0, 2–0, 1–1)	(A4) Penn State	Enterprise Center; Attendance: 16,814

Game reference

Mikhail Yegorov
Goalies
Arsenii Sergeev
Referees:
Ryan Hersey
Nathan Wieler
Linesmen:
Tyler Liffrig
Erik Contino

(Copponi) Jack Hughes (7) – 21:35	1–0
(C. Hutson, Kaplan) Cole Eiserman – 30:44	2–0
	2–1	42:15 – Nicholas DeGraves (4) (Schoen, Mack)
(Willander, Hughes) Jack Harvey – EN – 59:01	3–1

4 min min
Penalties
6 min min
33
Shots
33

Game summary

== Awards ==
=== NCAA ===
Award	Recipient
Hobey Baker Award	Isaac Howard, Michigan State
Derek Hines Unsung Hero Award	Jacob Truscott, Michigan
AHCA All-American Teams
West First Team	Position
Trey Augustine, Michigan State	G
Sam Rinzel, Minnesota	D
Isaac Howard, Michigan State	F
West Second Team	Position
Matt Basgall, Michigan State	D
Aiden Fink, Penn State	F
Jimmy Snuggerud, Minnesota	F

=== Big Ten ===
Award		Recipient
Player of the Year		Isaac Howard, Michigan State
Defensive Player of the Year		Sam Rinzel, Minnesota
Goaltender of the Year		Trey Augustine, Michigan State
Freshman of the Year		Michael Hage, Michigan
Scoring Champion		Isaac Howard, Michigan State
Coach of the Year		Steve Rohlik, Ohio State
Tournament Most Outstanding Player		Isaac Howard, Michigan State
All-Big Ten Teams
First Team	Position	Second Team
Trey Augustine, Michigan State	G	Arsenii Sergeev, Penn State
Matt Basgall, Michigan State	D	Ethan Edwards, Michigan
Sam Rinzel, Minnesota	D	Simon Mack, Penn State
Aiden Fink, Penn State	F	Quinn Finley, Wisconsin
Isaac Howard, Michigan State	F	T. J. Hughes, Michigan
Jimmy Snuggerud, Minnesota	F	Cole Knuble, Notre Dame
Freshman Team	Position	
Cameron Korpi, Michigan	G	
Cade Christenson, Penn State	D	
Logan Hensler, Wisconsin	D	
Charlie Cerrato, Penn State	F	
Michael Hage, Michigan	F	
Gavin Morrissey, Wisconsin	F	

== 2025 NHL entry draft ==
Round	Pick	Player	College	NHL team
1	6	Porter Martone ^{†}	Michigan State	Philadelphia Flyers
1	14	Jackson Smith ^{†}	Penn State	Columbus Blue Jackets
1	23	Logan Hensler	Wisconsin	Ottawa Senators
1	24	Will Horcoff	Michigan	Pittsburgh Penguins
1	26	Ryker Lee ^{†}	Michigan State	Nashville Predators
1	29	Mason West ^{†}	Michigan State	Chicago Blackhawks
2	35	Jacob Rombach ^{†}	Minnesota	Nashville Predators
2	43	Malcolm Spence ^{†}	Michigan	New York Rangers
2	45	Eric Nilson ^{†}	Michigan State	Anaheim Ducks
2	48	Shane Vansaghi	Michigan State	Philadelphia Flyers
2	49	Charlie Cerrato	Penn State	Carolina Hurricanes
2	53	Cole McKinney ^{†}	Michigan	San Jose Sharks
2	58	Jack Ivankovic ^{†}	Michigan	Nashville Predators
3	80	Maceo Phillips ^{†}	Minnesota	Calgary Flames
3	90	Mason Moe ^{†}	Minnesota	New Jersey Devils
3	91	Brady Peddle ^{†}	Michigan State	Pittsburgh Penguins
4	101	Drew Schock ^{†}	Michigan	Anaheim Ducks
4	109	Brent Solomon ^{†}	Wisconsin	Detroit Red Wings
4	113	John Mooney ^{†}	Minnesota	Montreal Canadiens
4	125	Jimmy Lombardi ^{†}	Michigan	Los Angeles Kings
4	128	Shea Busch ^{†}	Penn State	Florida Panthers
5	131	Asher Barnett ^{†}	Michigan	Edmonton Oilers
5	137	William Belle ^{†}	Notre Dame	Toronto Maple Leafs
5	145	Alexis Cournoyer ^{†}	Michigan State	Montreal Canadiens
5	155	Jackson Crowder ^{†}	Ohio State	Washington Capitals
6	181	Bruno Idzan ^{†}	Wisconsin	Ottawa Senators
7	201	Kale Dach ^{†}	Penn State	Pittsburgh Penguins
7	202	Jacob Kvasnicka ^{†}	Minnesota	New York Islanders
7	219	Ryan Rucinski ^{†}	Ohio State	Buffalo Sabres
7	223	Aidan Park ^{†}	Michigan	Edmonton Oilers

† incoming freshman
