= Gavin Brindley =

American ice hockey player (born 2004)

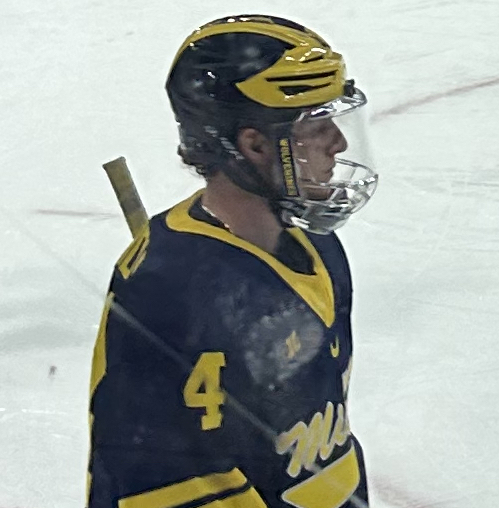
- Brindley with the Michigan Wolverines in November 2023
- Born: October 5, 2004 (age 22) Estero, Florida, U.S.
- Height: 5 ft 8 in (173 cm)
- Weight: 173 lb (78 kg; 12 st 5 lb)
- Position: Right wing
- Shoots: Right
- NHL team Former teams: Colorado Avalanche; Columbus Blue Jackets
- National team: United States
- NHL draft: 34th overall, 2023; Columbus Blue Jackets
- Playing career: 2024–present

Gavin Brindley (born October 5, 2004) is an American professional ice hockey player who is a right winger for the Colorado Avalanche of the National Hockey League (NHL). He was drafted in the second round, 34th overall, by the Columbus Blue Jackets in the 2023 NHL entry draft. He played college ice hockey at Michigan.

== Playing career ==
=== Junior ===
Brindley spent two seasons with the Tri-City Storm. During the 2020–21 season, he recorded nine goals and 13 assists in 51 games. During the 2021–22 season, he recorded 14 goals and 28 assists in 51 games and helped the Storm win the Anderson Cup.

=== College ===
Brindley began his collegiate career for the Michigan Wolverines during the 2022–23 season. He recorded 12 goals and 26 assists in 41 games during his freshman season and helped Michigan advance to the Frozen Four. On October 7, 2022, Brindley recorded his first career point, an assist in the season-opening game against Lindenwood. On October 14, 2022, Brindley recorded his first career goal in a game against Boston University. During the championship game at 2023 Big Ten tournament, he assisted on the game-tying and game-winning goals, as Michigan won their second consecutive tournament championship. He set the Big Ten tournament record for most assists in a single tournament with seven. After returning to the team after competing at the 2023 World Junior Ice Hockey Championships, he recorded 11 goals and 17 assists in the final 20 games of the season. After a standout freshmen season, Brindley was drafted in the second round, 34th overall, by the Columbus Blue Jackets in the 2023 NHL entry draft.

During the 2023–24 season, in his sophomore year, he was the Big Ten Scoring Champion, recording 12 goals and 17 assists in 23 conference games. He became the fifth Wolverine to lead the conference in scoring, and was named Big Ten Player of the Year. He led the team in scoring and finished the season with 25 goals and 28 assists in 40 games. He also ranked sixth in goals and eighth in points among all NCAA players. Following the season he was named to the All-Big Ten First Team and an AHCA West First Team All-American.

=== Professional ===
==== Columbus Blue Jackets ====
On April 15, 2024, Brindley concluded his collegiate career following his sophomore season by signing a three-year, entry-level contract with the Columbus Blue Jackets. He made his NHL debut for the Blue Jackets the next day in their final game of the regular season against the Carolina Hurricanes.

Brindley began the 2024–25 season on the injured reserve after suffering a broken finger in a preseason game against the St. Louis Blues on October 1, 2024. He was activated from injured reserve and loaned to the Blue Jackets' AHL affiliate, the Cleveland Monsters, on November 14, 2024. After an initial hot start offensively with the Monsters, Brindley needed an adjustment period to the heavy, physical schedule of the AHL as a 20-year-old, and faced offensive droughts to finish the year with just 17 points through 52 games.

==== Colorado Avalanche ====
On June 27, 2025, Brindley's tenure with the Blue Jackets ended after he was traded to the Colorado Avalanche, alongside second and third round picks, in exchange for Charlie Coyle and Miles Wood. Projected to start the 2025–26 season in the AHL with affiliate, the Colorado Eagles, Brindley impressed through pre-season and was amongst the team's scoring leaders, earning him an opening night roster spot with the Avalanche. He made his Avalanche debut from the fourth-line in a 4-1 opening victory over the Los Angeles Kings on October 9, 2025. By using his relentless pace and forechecking, Brindley notched his first NHL goal in a game against the Dallas Stars on October 11, 2025 and later his first game-winning goal on November 9, 2025 in overtime against the Vancouver Canucks. Contributing offensively in a limited role to begin the season, Brindley was signed a two-year contract extension on November 11, 2025. With his season hampered through a lower-body injury Brindley's scoring pace slowed and he was reassigned to the Eagles for the remainder of the season on March 26, 2026. He finished the season, helping the Eagles advance to the Conference Finals and completed his first year with the Avalanche posting 6 goals and 13 points through 56 regular season games.

== International play ==
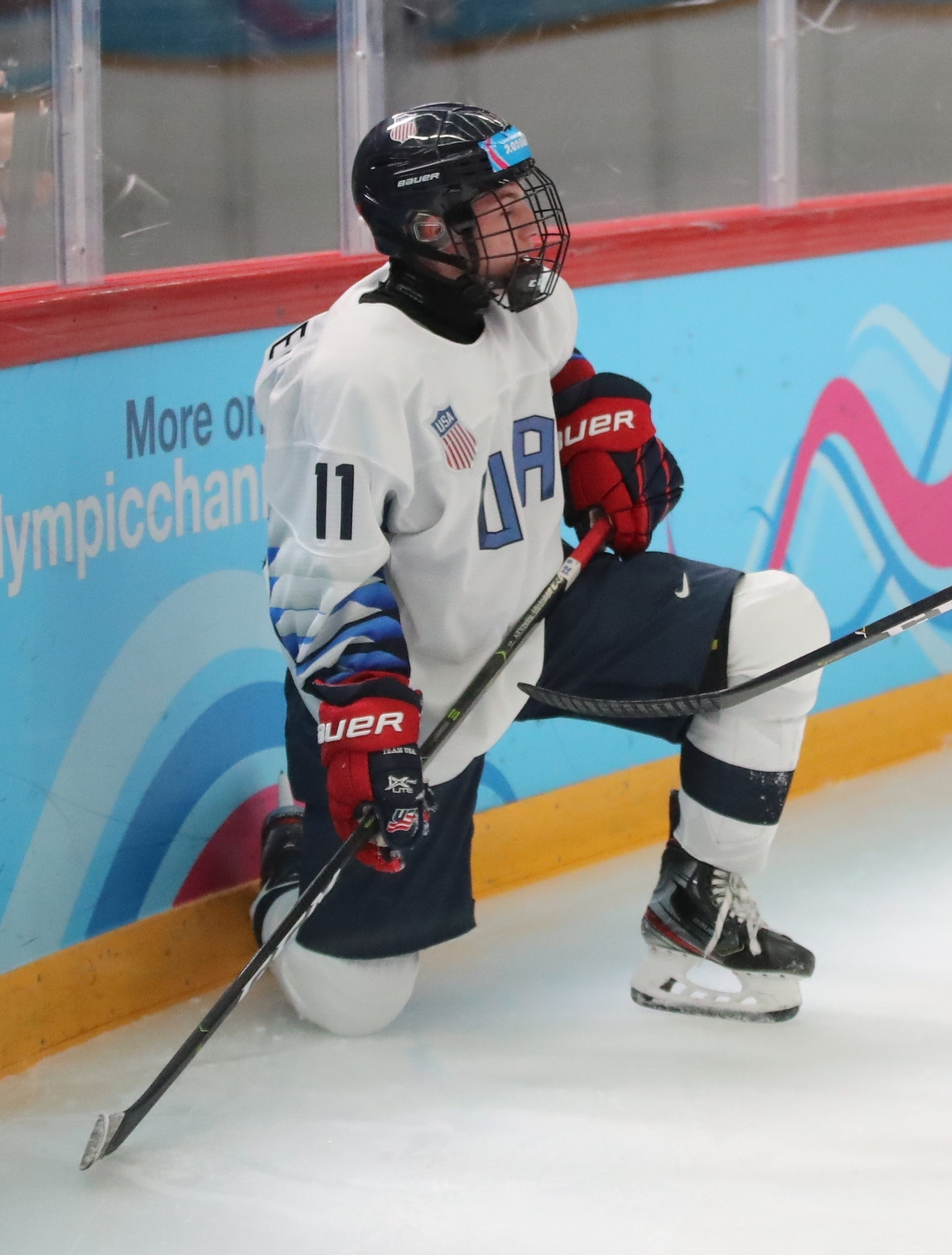
- Brindley at the 2020 Winter Youth Olympics

Medal record

Representing United States

Ice hockey

World Junior Championships
Gold medal – first place	2024 Sweden	
Bronze medal – third place	2023 Canada	

World U18 Championships
Silver medal – second place	2022 Germany	

Brindley represented the United States at the 2020 Winter Youth Olympics where he recorded one goal and one assist in four games and won a silver medal.

Brindley represented the United States at the 2022 IIHF World U18 Championships, where he recorded one goal and three assists in six games and won a silver medal.

On December 12, 2022, Brindley was named to the United States men's national junior ice hockey team to compete at the 2023 World Junior Ice Hockey Championships. During the tournament he recorded one goals and three assists in seven games and won a bronze medal.

On December 16, 2023, Brindley was again named to Team USA's roster to compete at the 2024 World Junior Ice Hockey Championships. During the tournament he recorded six goals and four assists in seven games and won a gold medal.

Brindley represented the United States at the 2024 IIHF World Championship where he made his senior national team debut and recorded one goal in five games.

== Personal life ==
Brindley's father, Ryan, played college ice hockey at Miami from 1996 to 1999 and professionally for eight years. Ryan is a native of Thunder Bay, Ontario, and founded Southeast Elite Hockey in Florida, where he currently serves as director.

== Career statistics ==
=== Regular season and playoffs ===
			Regular season					Playoffs
Season	Team	League	GP	G	A	Pts	PIM	GP	G	A	Pts	PIM
2020–21	Tri-City Storm	USHL	51	9	13	22	18	3	1	1	2	0
2021–22	Tri-City Storm	USHL	51	14	28	42	33	3	1	1	2	0
2022–23	University of Michigan	B1G	41	12	26	38	22	—	—	—	—	—
2023–24	University of Michigan	B1G	40	25	28	53	28	—	—	—	—	—
2023–24	Columbus Blue Jackets	NHL	1	0	0	0	0	—	—	—	—	—
2024–25	Cleveland Monsters	AHL	52	6	11	17	24	4	0	0	0	0
2025–26	Colorado Avalanche	NHL	56	6	7	13	8	—	—	—	—	—
2025–26	Colorado Eagles	AHL	9	2	4	6	2	17	3	5	8	10
NHL totals			57	6	7	13	8	—	—	—	—	—

=== International ===
Year	Team	Event	Result	GP	G	A	Pts	PIM
2022	United States	U18	2nd place, silver medalist(s)	6	1	3	4	2
2023	United States	WJC	3rd place, bronze medalist(s)	7	1	3	4	4
2024	United States	WJC	1st place, gold medalist(s)	7	6	4	10	0
2024	United States	WC	5th	5	1	0	1	0
Junior totals				20	8	10	18	6
Senior totals				5	1	0	1	0

== Awards and honours ==
Award	Year
USHL
All-Rookie Second Team	2021
College
All-Big Ten First Team	2024
Big Ten Scoring Champion	2024
Big Ten Player of the Year	2024
Big Ten All-Tournament Team	2024
AHCA West First Team All-American	2024

Awards and achievements
Preceded by Jimmy Snuggerud; Logan Cooley	Big Ten Scoring Champion; 2023–24	Succeeded by Isaac Howard
Preceded by Matthew Knies	Big Ten Player of the Year; 2023–24	Succeeded by Isaac Howard
