= Taro Hirose =

Canadian ice hockey player (born 1996)

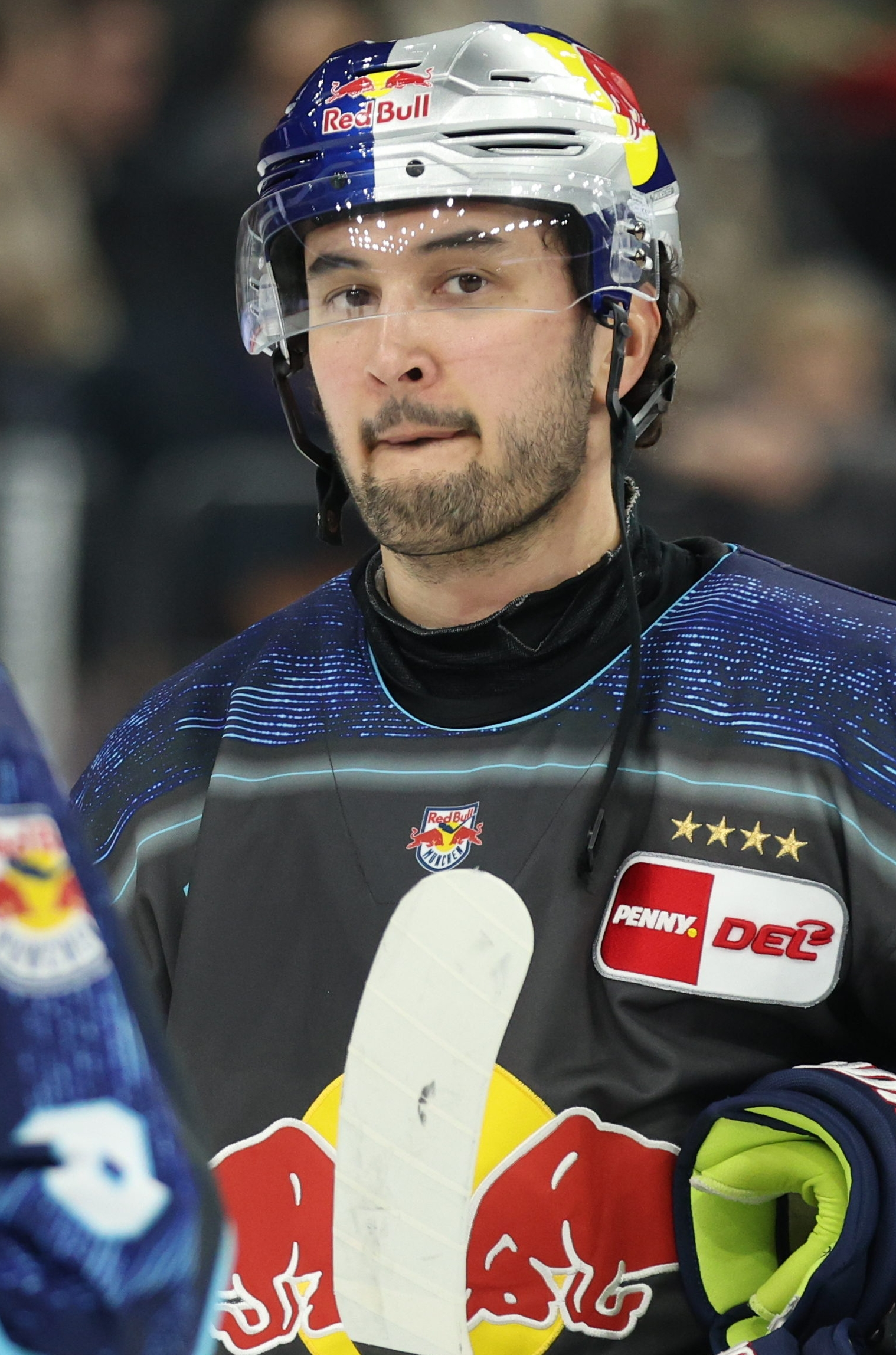
- Hirose in 2024
- Born: June 30, 1996 (age 30) Winnipeg, Manitoba, Canada
- Height: 5 ft 10 in (178 cm)
- Weight: 160 lb (73 kg; 11 st 6 lb)
- Position: Forward
- Shoots: Left
- DEL team Former teams: EHC München; Detroit Red Wings
- NHL draft: Undrafted
- Playing career: 2018–present

Taro Hirose (born June 30, 1996) is a Canadian professional ice hockey player who currently plays for EHC Red Bull München in the Deutsche Eishockey Liga (DEL). He previously played for the Detroit Red Wings of the National Hockey League (NHL).

== Playing career ==
=== High school ===
Hirose attended Edge School from 2011–14, where he posted 31 goals and 39 assists in 48 career Midget Prep Division games and 24 goals and 14 assists in 25 career Midget Varsity Division games. He won the Canadian Sport School Hockey League (CSSHL) Midget Prep Championship in 2013, and posted 21 goals and 22 assists in 27 games in 2014, and was subsequently named the CSSHL Midget Prep Division MVP.

=== Junior ===
During the 2014–15 season, Hirose recorded 18 goals and 32 assists in 58 games for the Salmon Arm Silverbacks, and was named the teams Rookie of the Year. In the 2015–16 season, he was elected an alternate captain for the Silverbacks, where he recorded 15 goals and 56 assists in 58 games, leading the team in scoring. In April 2015, Hirose committed to play for Michigan State University.

=== College ===
Hirose began his collegiate career for the Michigan State Spartans during the 2016–17 season. He recorded six goals and 18 assists in 34 games, ranking second on the team in scoring. His 24 points were the most points by a Spartan freshman since 2009–10. He recorded his first career goal and assist on October 28, 2016 against Princeton, becoming the first Spartan since 2009 to score his first collegiate goal while shorthanded.

During the 2017–18 season, he recorded 12 goals and 30 assists in 36 games for the Spartans. His team-leading 42 points were the most by a Spartan since Corey Tropp had 42 points in 2009–10, while his 30 assists were the most by a Spartan since Jim Slater in 2004–05. He led the Big Ten during the regular season in power-play assists (16) and was tied for first in power-play points (17), while he ranked second in the Big Ten in points (40) and assists (28). Following his outstanding season, he was named to the All-Big Ten Second Team.

During the 2018–19 season, Hirose was the Big Ten Scoring Champion, recording 10 goals and 24 assists in 34 conference games. He also led the NCAA in points (50), points-per-game (1.47), assists (35), multi-point games (15), and three-point games (9). His 50 points were the most by a Spartan since John-Michael Liles had 50 points in 2002–03, while his 35 assists were the most by a Spartan since Brad Fast had 35 assists in 2002–03. Following an outstanding season, he was named the Big Ten Player of the Year, and named to the All-Big Ten First Team, and AHCA/CCM First Team All-American. He was also named a finalist for the Hobey Baker Award.

=== Professional ===
On March 12, 2019, Hirose signed a two-year, entry-level contract with the Detroit Red Wings. He made his NHL debut on March 19 in a game against the New York Rangers, playing on the third line along with Frans Nielsen and Thomas Vanek. He recorded his first career NHL point, assisting on Nielsen's goal in the first period. On March 31, Hirose recorded his first career NHL goal against Jaroslav Halák of the Boston Bruins.

On January 12, 2021, the Red Wings assigned Hirose to the Grand Rapids Griffins. On July 27, 2021, the Red Wings signed Hirose to a one-year contract extension. However, he only appeared in six contests for the Red Wings in said season, adding only two assists over that span.

Hirose would play just 15 games for the Detroit Red Wings in the 2021–22 season scoring 4 points but was a big contributor with the Grand Rapids Griffins where he scored 53 points in 59 games. On May 22, 2022, Hirose was signed to a two-year contract extension with the Red Wings.

On September 13, 2024, Hirose signed a one-year contract with EHC Red Bull München in the Deutsche Eishockey Liga (DEL). In his first season with the team, Hirose played 55 games and earned 47 points.

== Personal life ==
Hirose's brother, Akito, is also a professional ice hockey player for the Fischtown Pinguins of the German DEL.

== Career statistics ==
			Regular season					Playoffs
Season	Team	League	GP	G	A	Pts	PIM	GP	G	A	Pts	PIM
2014–15	Salmon Arm Silverbacks	BCHL	58	18	32	50	12	—	—	—	—	—
2015–16	Salmon Arm Silverbacks	BCHL	58	15	56	71	18	6	1	4	5	0
2016–17	Michigan State Spartans	B1G	34	6	18	24	23	—	—	—	—	—
2017–18	Michigan State Spartans	B1G	36	12	30	42	4	—	—	—	—	—
2018–19	Michigan State Spartans	B1G	36	15	35	50	12	—	—	—	—	—
2018–19	Detroit Red Wings	NHL	10	1	6	7	2	—	—	—	—	—
2019–20	Detroit Red Wings	NHL	26	2	5	7	6	—	—	—	—	—
2019–20	Grand Rapids Griffins	AHL	35	5	22	27	12	—	—	—	—	—
2020–21	Grand Rapids Griffins	AHL	29	5	23	28	4	—	—	—	—	—
2020–21	Detroit Red Wings	NHL	6	0	2	2	0	—	—	—	—	—
2021–22	Grand Rapids Griffins	AHL	59	15	38	53	12	—	—	—	—	—
2021–22	Detroit Red Wings	NHL	15	1	3	4	4	—	—	—	—	—
2022–23	Grand Rapids Griffins	AHL	71	16	41	57	12	—	—	—	—	—
2022–23	Detroit Red Wings	NHL	3	0	0	0	2	—	—	—	—	—
2023–24	Grand Rapids Griffins	AHL	54	9	27	36	8	8	0	2	2	0
2024–25	EHC München	DEL	49	15	28	43	10	6	1	3	4	0
2025–26	EHC München	DEL	50	9	45	54	6	11	4	9	13	5
NHL totals			60	4	16	20	14	—	—	—	—	—

== Awards and honours ==
Honors	Year
College
All-Big Ten Second Team	2018
Big Ten Scoring Champion	2019
Big Ten Player of the Year	2019
All-Big Ten First Team	2019
AHCA West First-Team All-American	2019

Awards and achievements
Preceded by Cale Morris	Big Ten Player of the Year; 2018–19	Succeeded by Cole Hults
Preceded by Cooper Marody	Big Ten Scoring Champion; 2018–19	Succeeded by Cole Caufield
Preceded by Adam Gaudette	NCAA Ice Hockey Scoring Champion with Alex Limoges; 2018–19	Succeeded by Jack Dugan
