= Jim Westby =

American ice hockey player

- Born: March 5, 1937 (age 89) Minneapolis, Minnesota, U.S.
- Height: 6 ft 0 in (183 cm)
- Weight: 181 lb (82 kg; 12 st 13 lb)
- Position: Defense
- National team: United States
- Playing career: 1956–1964

James Allen Westby (born March 5, 1937) is an American former ice hockey player and Olympian.

== Playing career ==
Westby played with the United States at the 1964 Winter Olympics. He previously played for the Minnesota Golden Gophers of the University of Minnesota.

== Personal life ==
Westby's grandson, Jimmy Snuggerud, played college ice hockey for Minnesota and was drafted in the first round of the 2022 NHL entry draft by the St. Louis Blues, whom he currently plays for.
