= Cole Caufield =

American ice hockey player (born 2001)

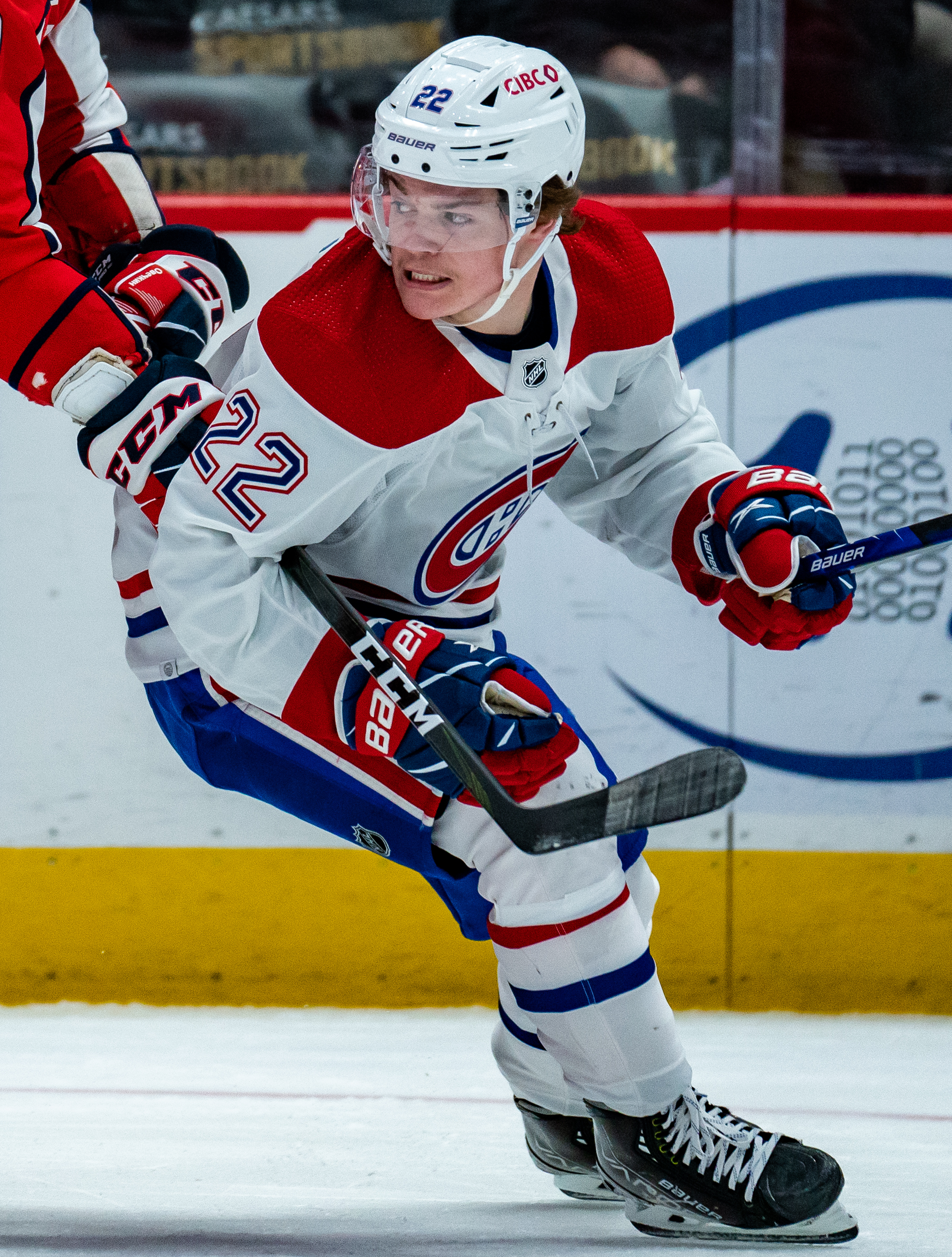
- Caufield with the Montreal Canadiens in November 2021
- Born: January 2, 2001 (age 25) Mosinee, Wisconsin, U.S.
- Height: 5 ft 8 in (173 cm)
- Weight: 175 lb (79 kg; 12 st 7 lb)
- Position: Winger
- Shoots: Right
- NHL team: Montreal Canadiens
- National team: United States
- NHL draft: 15th overall, 2019; Montreal Canadiens
- Playing career: 2021–present

Cole Caufield (born January 2, 2001) is an American professional ice hockey player who is a winger for the Montreal Canadiens of the National Hockey League (NHL). He was selected in the first round, 15th overall, by the Canadiens in the 2019 NHL entry draft.

Following success with the USA Hockey National Team Development Program (USNTDP), Caufield played collegiately for the University of Wisconsin-Madison of the National Collegiate Athletic Association (NCAA) for the 2019–20 and 2020–21 seasons. He won the Hobey Baker Award and was the leading goal and point-scorer for the 2020–21 NCAA season.

Internationally, Caufield has represented the United States in numerous tournaments including winning a gold medal at the U17 WHC, a silver and bronze medal at the 2018 U18 WJC and 2019 U18 WJC respectively, and a gold medal at the 2021 World Junior Ice Hockey Championships.

== Early life ==
Caufield was born in Mosinee, Wisconsin to a hockey-playing family; his father is Canadian while his mother is American. He started skating at the age of two. In addition to ice hockey, Caufield also played baseball and football as a child. His father taught him to shoot from the right as he believed that right sided shots have an easier angle to access a goaltender's glove hand. He played Bantam AAA for Team Wisconsin and Stevens Point Area Senior High School (SPASH), scoring 75 goals over two seasons for a total of 145 points before joining the USA Hockey National Team Development Program (USNTDP) in Plymouth, Michigan during spring 2017.

In his first year with the USNTDP, Caufield led the combined U17 and U18 team with 54 goals and 26 assists, falling one goal shy of matching the single season record of 55 set in 2014–15 by Auston Matthews. He likewise made a verbal commitment to play college ice hockey at the University of Wisconsin–Madison.

In the 2018–19 season, Caufield scored 72 goals and 28 assists, overtaking the all-time USNTDP goal record previously held by Phil Kessel as well as Matthews' aforementioned single season goal record.

Leading up to the 2019 NHL entry draft, Caufield was considered a top prospect and was ranked eighth by the NHL Central Scouting Bureau amongst North American skaters. On June 21, 2019, he was selected in the first round (15th overall) by the Montreal Canadiens. Shortly thereafter, he attended the Canadiens' annual development camp.

== Playing career ==
=== Collegiate ===
==== 2019–2021 ====
Caufield played for the Wisconsin Badgers of the National Collegiate Athletic Association (NCAA) from 2019 to 2021. During his freshman season in 2019–20, he recorded 19 goals and 17 assists in 36 games, leading the Big Ten in goals scored to win the conference scoring title. For his efforts, Caufield was selected to the Big Ten All-Freshman Team, All-First Team, and was also named the Big Ten Freshman of the Year, becoming the second Badger to win the award after Trent Frederic in 2017.

With uncertainty surrounding the 2020–21 NCAA season due to the COVID-19 pandemic, Caufield opted not to turn professional with the Canadiens and instead returned for his sophomore season with Wisconsin, saying that this decision was the "best thing for me...to come back, get another year, get stronger and faster and dominate more and become more of a leader".

During the aforementioned season, Caufield led the entire NCAA with 30 goals and 52 points in 31 games and became the first back-to-back Big Ten scoring champion. He was likewise selected to the NCAA East Regional All-Tournament Team, the Big Ten All-Tournament Team, and earned both First-Team All-Big Ten and Big Ten Player of the Year honors. On April 9, 2021, Caufield was named to the AHCA First-Team All-American and recipient of the annual Hobey Baker Award as the top NCAA Division I men's ice hockey player, becoming the second player in school history to win same following Blake Geoffrion over a decade prior.

=== Professional ===
==== 2021–2023 ====
On March 27, 2021, Caufield was signed to a three-year, entry-level contract by draft team the Montreal Canadiens. After the conclusion of his collegiate career, he was first assigned to the Canadiens' American Hockey League (AHL) affiliate, the Laval Rocket. He made his professional debut for Laval on April 9, recording two goals and one assist in a 5–3 win against the Toronto Marlies. Appearing in two AHL games for Laval, Caufield was recalled to the Canadiens' taxi squad on April 16 but was unable to be assigned to the active roster due to salary cap issues. Following injuries to teammates Paul Byron and Jonathan Drouin, Caufield made his NHL debut as an emergency recall in a 2–1 victory over the Calgary Flames on April 26. On May 1, he scored his first career NHL goal in a 3–2 overtime win over the Ottawa Senators. Two days later, in a 3–2 overtime win against the Toronto Maple Leafs, he became only the third player in NHL history to score his first two career goals in overtime. He concluded the regular season with four goals and an assist in ten games played.

After being a healthy scratch for the first two games of the 2021 Stanley Cup playoffs, Caufield made his NHL playoff debut in a 2–1 loss against the Toronto Maple Leafs on May 24. He scored his first NHL playoff goal in a 4–1 Stanley Cup semifinal loss against the Vegas Golden Knights on June 14. A few days later, Caufield scored the go-ahead goal in the Canadiens' series-clinching win over Vegas. In the 2021 Stanley Cup Finals, he recorded three assists en route to a series loss to the Tampa Bay Lightning. Collectively, Caufield appeared in twenty games in his inaugural postseason run. His 12 points (four goals and eight assists) trailed only Claude Lemieux (10-6—16 in 1986) and Jacques Lemaire (7-6—13 in 1968) for the most by a Canadiens rookie in a single postseason. Caufield also became the first rookie in league history to record three overtime points in a single postseason.

Entering the 2021–22 NHL season as a favorite to win the Calder Memorial Trophy, Caufield struggled amidst the Canadiens' poor start, recording just a single assist in his first ten games. On November 1, he was reassigned to the AHL ranks, where he scored two goals and three assists in six games with Laval. The Canadiens subsequently recalled him to the main roster on November 18.

Both he and the team continued to struggle and, at the thirty game mark, Caufield had only one goal and seven assists to his credit. After the midseason replacement of head coach Dominique Ducharme with retired NHL star forward Martin St. Louis in February 2022, Caufield quickly saw his ice time increase, returning to the team's top line alongside Nick Suzuki and Josh Anderson. He proceeded to score six goals in his next seven games, along with four assists, and was recognized as the Canadiens' player of the month for the first time. On March 15, Caufield scored two goals in eight seconds in a game against the Arizona Coyotes, the fastest two-goal performance for the Canadiens franchise since Stéphane Richer in 1987. He was named the NHL Rookie of the Month for March 2022, a period in which he led all rookies in goals (7) and total points (15). With this, Caufield became the first Canadiens player to receive this distinction since Carey Price in March 2008. In the final game of the season, Caufield scored his first career NHL hat-trick in a 10–2 victory over the Florida Panthers. He finished the season with 23 goals, tied for second in rookie goal-scoring behind Tanner Jeannot of the Nashville Predators with 24.

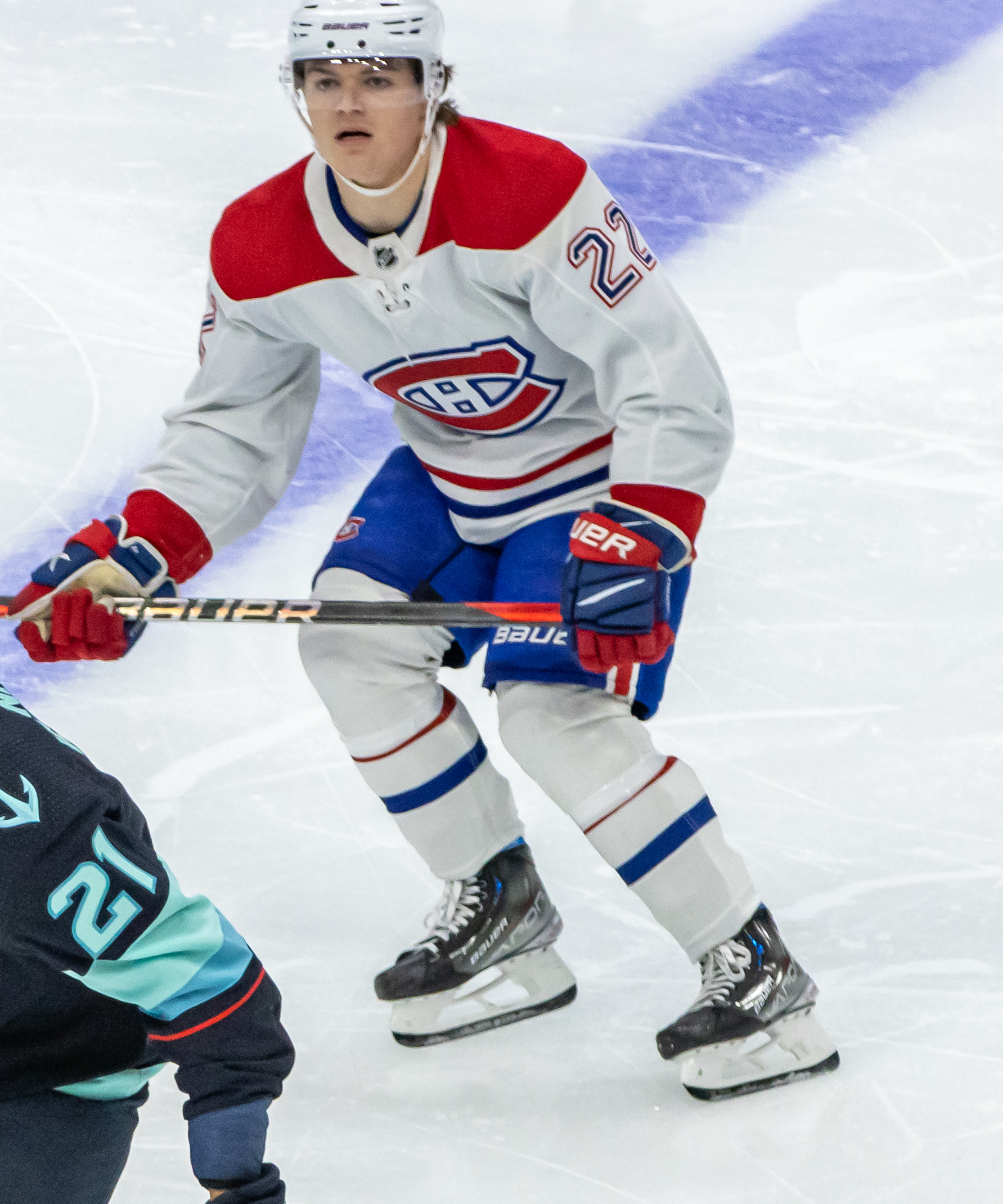
Caufield during the 2022–23 Montreal Canadiens season

The 2022–23 season was expected to be a development year for the rebuilding Canadiens. With Caufield and Suzuki an established duo on the team's first line, head coach St. Louis began experimenting with different players in the other winger slot. The early games saw Anderson, Sean Monahan and Mike Hoffman rotate through the position, before being given to the recently acquired Kirby Dach, the former 2019 third overall selection whom held initial expectation as a centerman. The line combination of Caufield–Suzuki–Dach generated strong initial results. On December 1, Caufield played his 100th career NHL game, and scored the game-winning goal, his 40th in the league. His 40 goals through his first 100 games was the fourth-highest for a Canadiens player in the preceding nine decades, behind only honored team members and Hockey Hall of Fame inductees Maurice "Rocket" Richard, Jean Béliveau, and Bernie Geoffrion. After scoring 26 goals and 10 assists in 46 games, it was announced on January 21 that Caufield required surgery for a shoulder injury that he had been playing through for some time, resulting in a premature end to his season.

==== 2023–present ====
Following the completion of his entry-level contract in advance of the 2023–24 season, Caufield signed a new eight-year, $62.8 million extension with the Canadiens on June 5, 2023. With hopes of continuing his scoring pace from the first half of the prior campaign, he would unexpectedly record the lowest shooting percentage of his career. Caufield's scoring difficulties were a subject of considerable media discussion, and partially attributed by observers to his recovery from surgery. Despite these struggles, he still set new personal highs in goals (28) and points (65), and was credited for improved off-puck play. His line with Suzuki and Juraj Slafkovský earned praise for its collective performance.

In September 2024, Caufield announced that he would be switching jersey numbers from 22 to 13 following the death of Columbus Blue Jackets winger Johnny Gaudreau the month prior, citing Gaudreau as an inspiration for players of smaller stature such as himself. Coincidentally, he would register his thirteenth goal of the 2024–25 season on the road at Nationwide Arena versus the Blue Jackets. He scored his 100th career NHL goal in a 3–2 Canadiens win versus the Vegas Golden Knights on December 31, 2024. Thereafter, he registered his 200th career NHL point on February 25, 2025 against the Carolina Hurricanes, effectively becoming the fastest player in franchise history to reach this juncture dating back over three decades (263 games played) following Stéphane Richer, who achieved the feat in 243 games culminating over the course of the 1988–89 season. On April 14, Caufield registered his 100th career NHL assist in a 4–3 shootout loss to the Chicago Blackhawks. He finished the season with a career-high 37 goals and 70 points, while the Canadiens qualified for the playoffs for the first time since 2021, eventually losing to the Capitals in five games during their ensuing first round matchup.

Shortly into the 2025–26 season, Caufield registered his eleventh career overtime winner in a game against the Seattle Kraken on October 28, 2025, establishing a new franchise record. In January 2026, he tied Guy Lafleur for the most goals by a Canadiens player in a single calendar month (13) dating back to 1979. With another game-winning goal in overtime against the Boston Bruins on March 18, Caufield reached the 40-goal mark for the first time in his career while also becoming the first Canadiens skater to reach this offensive output in a single campaign since Vincent Damphousse in 1993–94. Thereafter, he registered his first five-point game in the NHL, contributing a hat-trick and two assists against the New York Islanders on March 21. Capping off the month with a goal and an assist in a March 31 meeting with the Lightning, Caufield recorded his 300th career NHL point. On April 9, he scored his 50th goal of the season, becoming the first Montreal player to achieve this feat since Stéphane Richer in 1989–90. Collectively, he finished the season with 51 goals, finishing second in league-wide scoring behind Nathan MacKinnon of the Colorado Avalanche, who produced 53. Having achieved this while only accruing seven minor penalties, the Professional Hockey Writers' Association awarded Caufield the Lady Byng Memorial Trophy, the league's honor for sportsmanlike conduct, marking the first occurrence for a Canadiens player since Mats Näslund in 1987–88. For his efforts, he was also named to the NHL Second All-Star Team. Due to his overall success in Saturday night games over the course of the season, scoring 20 goals in 21 games taking place on the aforementioned day of the week, Caufield affectionately earned the nickname "Mr. Saturday Night".

Entering play for the 2026–27 season, Caufield made NHL history with his fifteenth career overtime goal on November 5, 2026, surpassing Connor McDavid as the fastest player to reach this plateau in only 384 career games to date.

== International play ==
Medal record

Men's ice hockey

Representing United States

World Junior Championships
Gold medal – first place	2021 Canada	

World U18 Championships
Bronze medal – third place	2019 Sweden	
Silver medal – second place	2018 Russia	

World U-17 Hockey Challenge
Gold medal – first place	2017 Canada	

In 2017, Caufield was selected to the World U-17 Hockey Challenge (U17 WHC), where he tallied eight goals and five assists in six games, leading the United States to a gold medal. After concluding the tournament with the most goals scored, he was named to the U17 WHC All-Star Team. He likewise helped his country capture gold at the 2017 Four Nations Cup in Russia, appearing in three games with six goals and one assist. At the 2018 IIHF World U-18 Championship, he notched six points in seven games towards a silver medal podium finish.

Caufield would continue his stellar play internationally the following season. In late 2018, Team USA won the 2018 Five Nations Cup in the Czech Republic, during which he recorded seven goals and two assists in four games. On April 27, 2019, Caufield tied Alex Ovechkin's single tournament goals record with 14 at the 2019 IIHF World U18 Championship (U18 WJC), en route to a bronze medal. Collectively, he was named the Most Valuable Player, Best Forward, as well as member of the tournament all-star team.

Joining the junior national team for the 2021 World Junior Ice Hockey Championships, Caufield recorded two goals and three assists in seven games, helping the United States win a gold medal.

Following the 2023–24 NHL season, with the Canadiens failing to qualify for the 2024 Stanley Cup playoffs, Caufield accepted an invitation to make his senior national team debut at the 2024 IIHF World Championship. He scored two goals in the team's group stage match against Poland, his first at the senior level. The Americans were ultimately eliminated in the quarterfinal by the Czech Republic.

== Personal life ==
Caufield has an older brother, Brock, who likewise played for the Wisconsin Badgers men's ice hockey team, and is currently a member of the Cincinnati Cyclones in the ECHL. Their father, Paul, born in Sault Ste. Marie, Ontario, Canada, played for the University of Wisconsin–Stevens Point (UWSP) from 1988 to 1992 and remains the team's all-time leading scorer. He returned to UWSP in 2002 to work as an assistant coach, but resigned in 2006 to assume his current position as manager of Ice Hawks Arena.

Caufield's paternal grandfather, Wayne, a member of the Wisconsin Hockey Hall of Fame since 2011, played semi-professional hockey from 1963 to 1976 for numerous teams, most notably the Milwaukee Admirals of the United States Hockey League (USHL), and spent over two decades coaching youth hockey and managing hockey clinics in the Milwaukee area following his retirement. He died on July 13, 2018, at the age of 75 years.

== Career statistics ==
=== Regular season and playoffs ===
			Regular season					Playoffs
Season	Team	League	GP	G	A	Pts	PIM	GP	G	A	Pts	PIM
2015–16	Stevens Point Area Senior High	HSWI	23	25	33	58	6	2	4	2	6	0
2016–17	Stevens Point Area Senior High	HSWI	22	50	29	79	17	3	3	5	8	2
2017–18	US NTDP Juniors	USHL	32	23	10	33	10	—	—	—	—	—
2017–18	US NTDP U17	USDP	40	44	19	63	2	—	—	—	—	—
2017–18	US NTDP U18	USDP	19	10	7	17	8	—	—	—	—	—
2018–19	US NTDP Juniors	USHL	28	29	12	41	23	—	—	—	—	—
2018–19	US NTDP U18	USDP	64	72	28	100	39	—	—	—	—	—
2019–20	University of Wisconsin	B1G	36	19	17	36	6	—	—	—	—	—
2020–21	University of Wisconsin	B1G	31	30	22	52	4	—	—	—	—	—
2020–21	Laval Rocket	AHL	2	3	1	4	0	—	—	—	—	—
2020–21	Montreal Canadiens	NHL	10	4	1	5	2	20	4	8	12	0
2021–22	Laval Rocket	AHL	6	2	3	5	0	—	—	—	—	—
2021–22	Montreal Canadiens	NHL	67	23	20	43	10	—	—	—	—	—
2022–23	Montreal Canadiens	NHL	46	26	10	36	2	—	—	—	—	—
2023–24	Montreal Canadiens	NHL	82	28	37	65	16	—	—	—	—	—
2024–25	Montreal Canadiens	NHL	82	37	33	70	14	5	3	1	4	0
2025–26	Montreal Canadiens	NHL	81	51	37	88	14	19	6	7	13	0
NHL totals			368	169	138	307	58	44	13	16	29	0

=== International ===
Year	Team	Event	Result	GP	G	A	Pts	PIM
2017	United States	U17	1st place, gold medalist(s)	6	8	5	13	0
2018	United States	WJC18	2nd place, silver medalist(s)	7	4	2	6	0
2019	United States	WJC18	3rd place, bronze medalist(s)	7	14	4	18	4
2020	United States	WJC	6th	5	1	1	2	0
2021	United States	WJC	1st place, gold medalist(s)	7	2	3	5	2
2024	United States	WC	5th	8	4	4	8	2
Junior totals				32	29	15	44	6
Senior totals				8	4	4	8	2

== Awards and honors ==
Award	Year	Ref
International
World U-17 Hockey Challenge All-Star Team	2017	
World U18 Championships MVP	2019	
World U18 Championships Best Forward	2019	
World U18 Championships Media All-Star Team	2019	
Big Ten
Scoring Champion	2020, 2021	
All-Freshman Team	2020	
Freshman of the Year	2020	
First Team All-Conference	2020, 2021	
Player of the Year	2021	
All-Tournament Team	2021	
NCAA
AHCA West First Team All-American	2021	
All-USCHO First Team	2021	
East Regional All-Tournament Team	2021	
Hobey Baker Award	2021	
Jim Johannson Award	2021	
NHL
Rookie of the Month (March 2022)	2022	
Lady Byng Memorial Trophy	2026	
NHL Second All-Star Team	2026	

== Records ==
USA Hockey National Team Development Program:

- Most goals, regular season: 72 (2018–19)

IIHF World U18 Championships:

- Most goals, U.S. skater: 18 (Note: Record shared with Cole Eiserman who tied this production between both the 2023 & 2024 iterations of the tournament.) (2018, 2019)
  - Most goals, single tournament: 14 (Note: Record shared with Alexander Ovechkin who established this production during the 2002 tournament.) (2019)

National Hockey League:

- Most overtime points by a rookie, single postseason: 3 (2021)

Montreal Canadiens:

- Most overtime goals, career: 15

== Notes ==
Awards and achievements
Preceded by Jesperi Kotkaniemi	Montreal Canadiens first-round draft pick 2019	Succeeded by Kaiden Guhle
Preceded by Sammy Walker	Big Ten Freshman of the Year; 2019–20	Succeeded by Thomas Bordeleau
Preceded by Taro Hirose	Big Ten Scoring Champion; 2019–20, 2020–21	Succeeded by Matty Beniers
Preceded by Cole Hults	Big Ten Player of the Year; 2020–21	Succeeded by Ben Meyers
Preceded by Jack Dugan	NCAA Ice Hockey Scoring Champion; 2020–21	Succeeded by Bobby Brink
Preceded by Scott Perunovich	Hobey Baker Award; 2020–21	Succeeded by Dryden McKay
Preceded by Anze Kopitar	Lady Byng Memorial Trophy winner 2026	Succeeded by Incumbent
