= Ben Meyers =

American ice hockey player (born 1998)

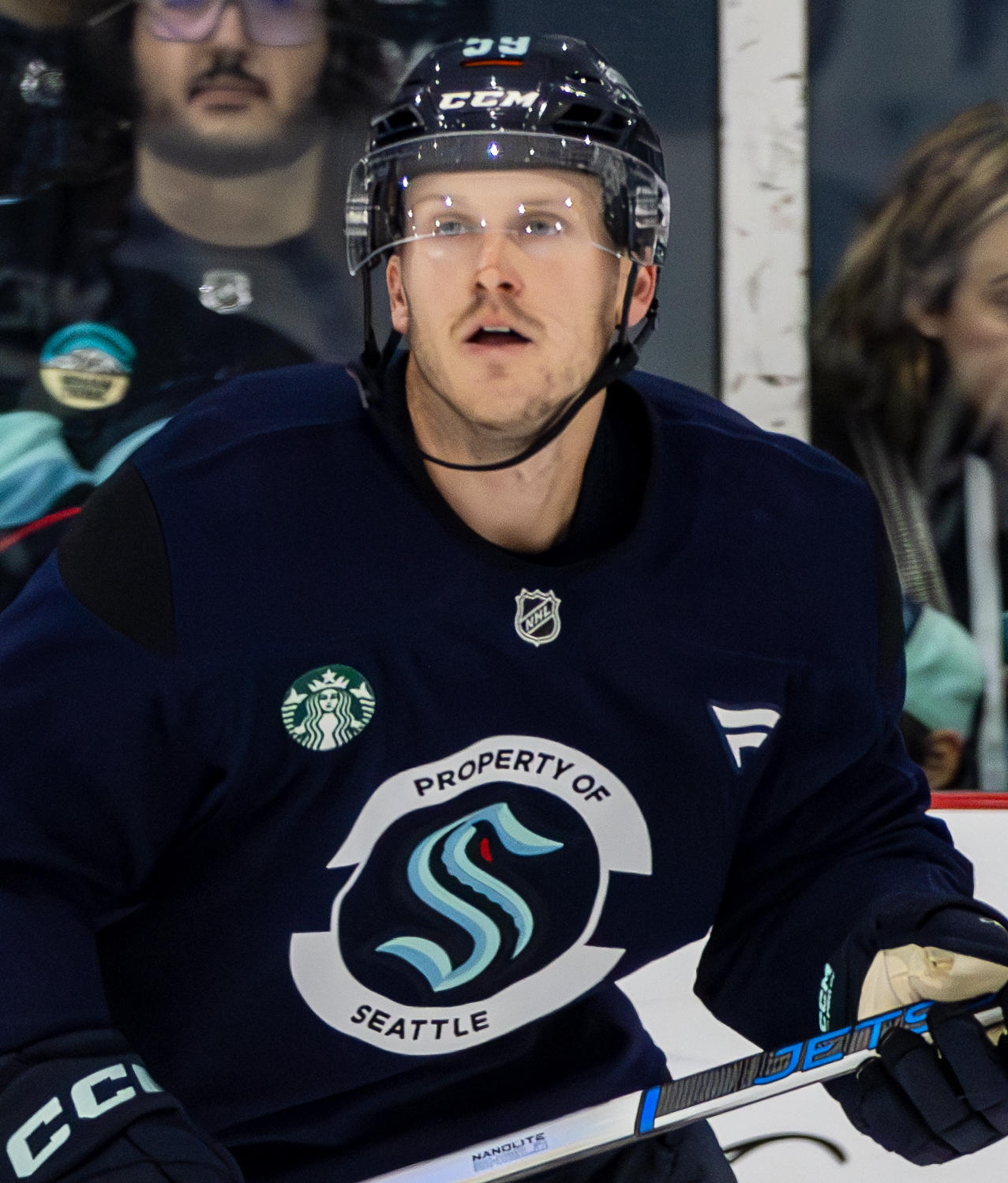
- Meyers with the Seattle Kraken in 2024
- Born: November 15, 1998 (age 27) Delano, Minnesota, U.S.
- Height: 5 ft 11 in (180 cm)
- Weight: 194 lb (88 kg; 13 st 12 lb)
- Position: Forward
- Shoots: Left
- NHL team Former teams: Seattle Kraken; Colorado Avalanche; Anaheim Ducks
- National team: United States
- NHL draft: Undrafted
- Playing career: 2022–present

Benjamin Meyers (born November 15, 1998) is an American professional ice hockey forward for the Seattle Kraken of the National Hockey League (NHL). He formerly played for the Colorado Avalanche and Anaheim Ducks. He played college ice hockey at the University of Minnesota.

== Playing career ==
=== Collegiate ===
Meyers joined the National Collegiate Athletic Association (NCAA) University of Minnesota Golden Gophers from the Fargo Force of the United States Hockey League (USHL) where he was an alternate captain and helped the Force win the Clark Cup in 2018. In his first season with the Golden Gophers in 2019–20 he scored ten goals and 26 points in 37 games. He was named to the Big Ten All-Freshmen Team. In his sophomore season in 2020–21, Meyers was named an alternate captain. He scored 12 goals and 28 points in 31 games. In 2021–22, his junior year, Meyers was named the team's captain. He scored 17 goals and 41 points in 34 games and was named as a Hobey Baker Award finalist, the first Golden Gopher to be a finalist since 2002. He scored his first hat trick against the Wisconsin Badgers on February 25, 2022. The Golden Gophers won the Big Ten Season Championship and appeared in the NCAA Frozen Four for the first time since 2014. Meyers was named to the Academic All-Big Ten, Academic All-District, Second Team All-America selection, 2021-22 Big Ten Player of the Year, First Team All-Big Ten selection and an NCAA All-Regional Team pick.

=== Professional ===
On April 13, 2022, Meyers signed a two-year contract with the Colorado Avalanche of the National Hockey League (NHL). He made his NHL debut on April 17, 2022, scoring his first NHL goal against Frederik Andersen in a 7–4 win over the Carolina Hurricanes. He finished the 2021–22 season with five games played and the single goal. Meyers began the 2022–23 season with Colorado, scoring a goal against the Minnesota Wild on his first return to the state on October 17, 2022. The Avalanche decided that Meyers needed more development and sent him to their American Hockey League (AHL) affiliate, the Colorado Eagles, to work on some issues that were raised by Avalanche coach Jared Bednar. Meyers bounced between the NHL and AHL for the remainder of the season, getting into 39 games for the Avalanche scoring four goals and 6 goals and 24 points in 30 games for the Eagles. He also played in six of the Avalanche's seven playoff games. Meyers re-signed to a one-year contract with the Avalanche on July 26, 2023.

Meyers was assigned to the Eagles to start the 2023–24 season. Meyers spent the season shuttling between the Eagles and Avalanche, appearing in nine NHL games, scoring one goal and 32 AHL games, scoring 11 goals and 25 points. On March 8, 2024, the Avalanche traded Meyers to the Anaheim Ducks in exchange for a 2024 fifth-round pick. He made his Ducks debut that night in a 6–2 loss to the Dallas Stars. He played out the remainder of the season with the Ducks, registering two assists through 14 appearances.

As an unrestricted free agent from the Ducks, Meyers was signed to a one-year, $755,000 contract with the Seattle Kraken on July 1, 2024. After going unclaimed on waivers, Meyers was assigned to Seattle's AHL affiliate, the Coachella Valley Firebirds, to begin the 2024–25 season. He was recalled by Seattle on November 17 and made his Kraken debut that night in a 2–0 loss to the New York Rangers.

== International play ==
Meyers was selected to represent the United States in the men's tournament at the 2022 Winter Olympics, alongside teammates Brock Faber and Matthew Knies. At the tournament, he scored two goals and four points, second on Team USA.

On May 5, 2022, Meyers was named to the United States team to compete at the 2022 IIHF World Championship. He recorded four goals and four assists in ten games.

== Career statistics ==
=== Regular season and playoffs ===
			Regular season					Playoffs
Season	Team	League	GP	G	A	Pts	PIM	GP	G	A	Pts	PIM
2013–14	Delano High	USHS	25	18	17	35	11	2	0	3	3	0
2014–15	Delano High	USHS	25	18	32	50	6	3	2	1	3	0
2015–16	Delano High	USHS	25	32	29	61	30	3	1	5	6	0
2016–17	Delano High	USHS	25	46	53	99	24	6	6	15	21	14
2016–17	Fargo Force	USHL	5	1	0	1	0	3	0	0	0	0
2017–18	Fargo Force	USHL	60	24	20	44	30	14	4	3	7	8
2018–19	Fargo Force	USHL	59	33	32	65	26	2	1	0	1	0
2019–20	University of Minnesota	B1G	37	10	16	26	8	—	—	—	—	—
2020–21	University of Minnesota	B1G	31	12	16	28	12	—	—	—	—	—
2021–22	University of Minnesota	B1G	34	17	24	41	18	—	—	—	—	—
2021–22	Colorado Avalanche	NHL	5	1	0	1	0	—	—	—	—	—
2022–23	Colorado Avalanche	NHL	39	4	0	4	6	6	0	0	0	2
2022–23	Colorado Eagles	AHL	30	6	18	24	15	2	0	1	1	2
2023–24	Colorado Eagles	AHL	32	11	14	25	2	—	—	—	—	—
2023–24	Colorado Avalanche	NHL	9	1	0	1	0	—	—	—	—	—
2023–24	Anaheim Ducks	NHL	14	0	2	2	6	—	—	—	—	—
2024–25	Coachella Valley Firebirds	AHL	57	23	28	51	26	6	1	2	3	2
2024–25	Seattle Kraken	NHL	8	0	0	0	2	—	—	—	—	—
2025–26	Coachella Valley Firebirds	AHL	11	9	4	13	2	—	—	—	—	—
2025–26	Seattle Kraken	NHL	52	7	8	15	16	—	—	—	—	—
NHL totals			127	13	10	23	30	6	0	0	0	2

=== International ===
Year	Team	Event	Result	GP	G	A	Pts	PIM
2022	United States	OG	5th	4	2	2	4	0
2022	United States	WC	4th	10	4	4	8	2
Senior totals				14	6	6	12	2

== Awards and honors ==
Award	Year	Ref
USHS
All-USA Hockey Second Team	2017	
USHL
Clark Cup champion	2018	
Second All-Star Team	2019	
College
All-Big Ten First Team	2022	
Big Ten Player of the Year	2022	
AHCA West Second Team All-American	2022	

Awards and achievements
Preceded by Cole Caufield	Big Ten Player of the Year; 2021–22	Succeeded by Matthew Knies
