= List of Big Ten All-Tournament Teams =

The Big Ten All-Tournament Team is an honor bestowed at the conclusion of the NCAA Division I Big Ten Conference tournament to the players judged to have performed the best during the championship game. The team is composed of three forwards, two defensemen and one goaltender with additional players named in the event of a tie. Voting for the honor is conducted by the head coaches of each member team once the tournament has completed and any player regardless of their team's finish is eligible.

The All-Tournament Team began being awarded after the first championship in 2014, following the dissolution of the CCHA conference in 2013.

== All-Tournament Teams ==
=== 2010s ===
2014
Player	Pos	Team
Christian Frey	G	Ohio State
Drew Brevig	D	Ohio State
Frankie Simonelli	D	Wisconsin
Ryan Dzingel	F	Ohio State
Michael Mersch	F	Wisconsin
Mark Zengerle	F	Wisconsin

2015
Player	Pos	Team
Adam Wilcox	G	Minnesota
Michael Downing	D	Michigan
Mike Reilly	D	Minnesota
Zach Hyman	F	Michigan
Travis Boyd	F	Minnesota
Kyle Rau	F	Minnesota

2016
Player	Pos	Team
Steve Racine	G	Michigan
Zach Werenski	D	Michigan
Luke Juha	D	Penn State
J. T. Compher	F	Michigan
Kyle Connor	F	Michigan
Tyler Sheehy	F	Minnesota

2017
Player	Pos	Team
Peyton Jones	G	Penn State
Vince Pedrie	D	Penn State
Erik Autio	D	Penn State
Luke Kunin	F	Wisconsin
Liam Folkes	F	Penn State
David Gust	F	Ohio State

2018
Player	Pos	Team
Cale Morris	G	Notre Dame
Jordan Gross	D	Notre Dame
Matt Miller	D	Ohio State
Cam Morrison	F	Notre Dame
Mason Jobst	F	Ohio State
Tanner Laczynski	F	Ohio State

2019
Player	Pos	Team
Cale Morris	G	Notre Dame
Andrew Peeke	D	Notre Dame
Spencer Stastney	D	Notre Dame
Cam Morrison	F	Notre Dame
Liam Folkes	F	Penn State
Alex Limoges	F	Penn State

=== 2020s ===
2020
Tournament cancelled due to COVID-19 pandemic

2021
Player	Pos	Team
Jack LaFontaine	G	Minnesota
Mike Koster	D	Minnesota
Ty Emberson	D	Wisconsin
Cole Caufield	F	Wisconsin
Sampo Ranta	F	Minnesota
Sammy Walker	F	Minnesota

2022
Player	Pos	Team
Erik Portillo	G	Michigan
Jackson LaCombe	D	Minnesota
Luke Hughes	D	Michigan
Mackie Samoskevich	F	Michigan
Brendan Brisson	F	Michigan
Matty Beniers	F	Michigan

2023
Player	Pos	Team
Justen Close	G	Minnesota
Seamus Casey	D	Michigan
Luke Hughes	D	Michigan
Adam Fantilli	F	Michigan
Rutger McGroarty	F	Michigan
Logan Cooley	F	Minnesota

2024
Player	Pos	Team
Trey Augustine	G	Michigan State
Seamus Casey	D	Michigan
Nash Nienhuis	D	Michigan State
Gavin Brindley	F	Michigan
Rutger McGroarty	F	Michigan
Daniel Russell	F	Michigan State

2025
Player	Pos	Team
Trey Augustine	G	Michigan State
Matt Basgall	D	Michigan State
Damien Carfagna	D	Ohio State
Gunnarwolfe Fontaine	F	Ohio State
Isaac Howard	F	Michigan State
JJ Wiebusch	F	Penn State

2026
Player	Pos	Team
Jack Ivankovic	G	Michigan
Luca Fantilli	D	Michigan
William Smith	D	Ohio State
T. J. Hughes	F	Michigan
Jake Karabela	F	Ohio State
Jayden Perron	F	Michigan

=== All-Tournament Team players by school ===
School	Winners
Michigan	22
Minnesota	12
Ohio State	11
Penn State	8
Notre Dame	7
Michigan State	6
Wisconsin	6

=== Multiple appearances ===
Player	Appearances
Trey Augustine	2
Seamus Casey	2
Luke Hughes	2
Cale Morris	2
Cam Morrison	2
Rutger McGroarty	2
