= Cale Morris =

American collegiate ice hockey player

- Born: May 22, 1996 (age 30) Larkspur, Colorado, U.S.
- Height: 6 ft 1 in (185 cm)
- Weight: 190 lb (86 kg; 13 st 8 lb)
- Position: Goaltender
- Shot: Left
- Played for: Rockford IceHogs; Chicago Wolves; Coachella Valley Firebirds
- NHL draft: Undrafted
- Playing career: 2021–2024

Christopher Cale Morris (born May 22, 1996) is an American former professional ice hockey player.

Following success in the United States Hockey League with the Chicago Steel and Waterloo Black Hawks, Morris joined the University of Notre Dame in the Big Ten Conference (B1G). During the 2017–18 season, he was awarded the Mike Richter Award as the most outstanding goaltender in Division I NCAA men's ice hockey, Big Ten Goaltender of the Year and Big-Ten Player of the Year as he led Notre Dame to the 2018 NCAA National Championship Finals. He was also selected for the AHCA First Team All-American, All-Big Ten First Team, and named a Hobey Baker Award finalist.

== Early life ==
Morris was born on May 22, 1996, to mother Kathy Morris and father Christopher Lee Morris. He has two older sisters, Kalee and Jessi. Growing up in Colorado, Morris played football, baseball and soccer on top of hockey; he states that he was inspired to become more committed to hockey in part due to goaltender Kyle Hayton's guidance. Hayton was a friend of his sisters who let Morris use his old equipment and practice in net. Morris played AAA hockey with the Colorado Thunderbirds from 2008 to 2013.

== Playing career ==
=== USHL ===
Going undrafted into the United States Hockey League (USHL), Morris made the Chicago Steel roster following tryout camp in 2013. In his senior year of high school, Morris moved to Bartlett, Illinois, to play with the Chicago Steel and lived with teammate Robby Jackson. In his first year with the Steel, Morris finished the season with a 19–6–3 record and a .937 save percentage and graduated from South Elgin High School. His success with the Steel drew attention from college scouts.

In his first NHL draft-eligible year, Morris posted a .895 save percentage with the Chicago Steel to begin the 2014–15 season. He was traded in January 2015 to the Waterloo Black Hawks. While playing with the Black Hawks, Morris posted a 19-6-3 record and a .937 save percentage in 28 games. With a season record of 27–15–4 and .920 save percentage that placed second in the league, Morris was selected for the USHL Third All-Star Team. During that season, Morris committed to play NCAA college hockey for the University of Notre Dame Fighting Irish. Although the final rankings from the NHL Central Scouting Bureau ranked Morris 15th for North American goaltenders, he went undrafted in the 2015 NHL entry draft.

In his second season with the Black Hawks, Morris was named an alternate captain. By December 2015, Morris had a 7–4–2 record and was in the league's top goals-against average and save percentage. As a result, he was selected to the USHL/NHL Top Prospects Game. While playing in the tournament, Morris became the fifth goaltender to post a shutout at the USHL/NHL Top Prospects Game. On March 22, 2016, Morris set a new Black Hawks record with his seventh regular season shutout. His seventh shutout came in a 5–0 win over his former team, the Chicago Steel. A month later, Morris was voted as the Waterloo Black Hawks MVP. During the summer, Morris was invited to the Anaheim Ducks Development Camp Scrimmage as a college invite before joining Notre Dame for his freshman year.

=== Collegiate ===
Enrolled in the Mendoza College of Business, Morris made his Notre Dame collegiate debut on October 7, 2016, against Arizona State. He spent the rest of the season backing up Cal Petersen and did not play another game in the regular season. At the conclusion of the 2016–17 season, Petersen signed a professional contract, ending his collegiate career and leaving an opening for Morris to become the new starter.

After beginning his sophomore season, he split his time in net with freshman Dylan St. Cyr, Morris gained the starter position and helped Notre Dame win 16 games in a row. On December 6, 2017, Morris was named the Hockey Commissioners’ Association (HCA) Player of the Month for November after he posted an 8–0–0 record with three shutouts and a nation-leading .969 save percentage. On February 9, 2018, Morris made 31 saves in a 2–1 victory over Ohio State to help the Fighting Irish win the Big Ten regular-season championship and qualify for the 2018 Big Ten men's ice hockey tournament in their first year in the Big Ten conference. Ohio State and Notre Dame met again during the post-season in the Big Ten Championship Finals. Before the Championship Finals, Morris was named Big Ten Goaltender of the Year, Big-Ten Player of the Year, First Team All-Big Ten, and a Hobey Baker Award top 10 finalist. On March 17, the Fighting Irish beat Ohio State in overtime to clinch the Big Ten Conference Tournament championships and qualify for the 2018 NCAA National Championship tournament. Morris was named Big Ten Tournament MVP and selected for the Big Ten All-Tournament Teams due to his play. He then helped the Fighting Irish qualify for the 2018 NCAA National Championship Final by defeating the Michigan Wolverines in the National Semifinals. After Notre Dame advanced to the National Championship Finals, Morris was awarded the Mike Richter Award, becoming the first Notre Dame goaltender to receive the award. His .945 save percentage led the United States collegiate league while his 1.91 goals against average was sixth. Notre Dame played the 2018 National Championship game against Minnesota Duluth, losing 2–1 with Morris making 33 saves. Although Notre Dame lost, Morris was named an AHCA First Team All-American.

Leading up to the 2018–19 season, Morris was named a unanimous selection on the Big Ten Preseason Watch List. In the annual Ice Breaker Tournament, Morris posted a 22 save shutout in a 3–0 win over Providence Friars to win the Championship. His second shutout of the season came on December 31 in a 4–0 win over Boston College. This shutout helped earn him Big Ten First Star of the Week honors. On January 16, 2019, Morris was named a nominee for the Hobey Baker Award. Morris helped the Fighting Irish qualify for the 2019 Big Ten men's ice hockey tournament where he posted back-to-back shutouts to defeat the Michigan State Spartans in the quarterfinals. On March 12, Morris was again named a finalist for Big Ten Goaltender of the Year and was later selected for the All-Big Ten Second Team. On March 23, 2019, Morris and the Notre Dame Fighting Irish won their second Big Ten Conference Tournament championship title after a 3–2 win over Penn State. After the game, Morris was named the tournament's Most Outstanding Player and selected for the Big Ten All-Tournament team. However, in the second round of the 2019 NCAA Division I Men's Ice Hockey Tournament against the UMass Minutemen, Notre Dame lost 4–0 and was eliminated from the competition.

On April 12, Morris committed to return to Notre Dame for his senior year, citing "unfinished business" as his reason. He was subsequently named an alternate captain on September 19 alongside Tory Dello, becoming only the second goaltender to become an alternate captain under head coach Jeff Jackson. However, before he could begin the collegiate season, Morris was injured during training camp which forced his season debut to be delayed. He eventually made his season debut on October 26 against Lake Superior State where he made 29 saves in the 6–4 win. By December, Morris was named a Big Ten First Star of the Week for recording his ninth career collegiate shutout while facing 37 shots. On February 21, in his 100th collegiate game, Morris recorded his 56th win in a 2–1 victory over the Michigan Wolverines.

=== Professional ===
As collegiate hockey was suspended due to the COVID-19 pandemic in North America, Morris signed his first professional contract with the Rockford IceHogs of the American Hockey League (AHL) on October 12, 2020.

As an impending restricted free agent with the Blackhawks, Morris was not tendered a qualifying offer by the rebuilding Blackhawks, and was released to free agency on 12 July 2022. Morris opted to continue in the AHL, later signing a one-year contract for the 2022–23 season with the Chicago Wolves, the primary affiliate to the Carolina Hurricanes, on July 26, 2022.

At the conclusion of his contract with the Wolves, Morris opted to continue his professional career in the ECHL, signing a one-year contract for the 2023–24 season with the Kansas City Mavericks on October 19, 2023.

On December 11, 2023, the Coachella Valley Firebirds of the American Hockey League (AHL) signed Morris to a professional tryout agreement (PTO).

== International play ==
In his second season with the Chicago Steel, Morris was selected to play for the United States at the 2014 World Junior A Challenge in Kindersley, Saskatchewan. With his help, Team USA won the 2014 World Junior A Challenge championship title.

== Career statistics ==
=== Regular season and playoffs ===
			Regular season									Playoffs
Season	Team	League	GP	W	L	T/OT	MIN	GA	SO	GAA	SV%	GP	W	L	MIN	GA	SO	GAA	SV%
2013–14	Chicago Steel	USHL	23	13	5	1	1129	60	3	2.93	.910	—	—	—	—	—	—	—	—
2014–15	Chicago Steel	USHL	18	8	9	1	1010	56	0	3.33	.895	—	—	—	—	—	—	—	—
2014–15	Waterloo Black Hawks	USHL	28	19	6	3	1654	51	4	1.85	.937	—	—	—	—	—	—	—	—
2015–16	Waterloo Black Hawks	USHL	38	20	12	3	2135	88	3	2.47	.906	9	5	4	577	24	0	2.50	.921
2016–17	Notre Dame	HE	1	0	0	0	20	1	0	3.04	.875	—	—	—	—	—	—	—	—
2017–18	Notre Dame	B1G	37	27	8	1	2193	71	4	1.94	.944	—	—	—	—	—	—	—	—
2018–19	Notre Dame	B1G	35	19	13	3	2086	76	4	2.19	.930	—	—	—	—	—	—	—	—
2019–20	Notre Dame	B1G	33	12	14	7	1958	79	3	2.42	.916	—	—	—	—	—	—	—	—
2020–21	Rockford IceHogs	AHL	7	2	3	0	358	15	0	2.52	.923	—	—	—	—	—	—	—	—
2021–22	Indy Fuel	ECHL	19	9	7	2	1103	52	2	2.83	.896	—	—	—	—	—	—	—	—
2021–22	Rockford IceHogs	AHL	7	2	4	0	400	21	0	3.15	.905	1	0	0	20	1	0	3.00	.909
2022–23	Norfolk Admirals	ECHL	25	10	14	0	1411	86	2	3.66	.876	—	—	—	—	—	—	—	—
2022–23	Chicago Wolves	AHL	7	1	4	2	415	36	0	5.21	.843	—	—	—	—	—	—	—	—
2023–24	Kansas City Mavericks	ECHL	32	21	7	2	1745	75	1	2.58	.911	9	6	3	516	28	0	3.25	.899
2023–24	Coachella Valley Firebirds	AHL	7	2	2	2	411	18	0	2.63	.919	—	—	—	—	—	—	—	—
AHL totals			28	7	13	4	1,584	90	0	3.41	.896	1	0	0	20	1	0	3.00	.909

== Awards and honors ==
Award	Year	Ref
USHL
USHL Third All-Star Team	2015	
College
Mike Richter Award	2018	
Big Ten Goaltender of the Year	2018	
Big Ten Player of the Year	2018	
All-Big Ten First Team	2018	
AHCA First Team All-American	2018	
Hobey Baker Award top 10 finalist	2018	
Academic All Big Ten	2018	
Big Ten All-Tournament Team	2018, 2019	
Big Ten Tournament MVP	2018, 2019	
All-Big Ten Second Team	2019	

Awards and achievements
Preceded by Tyler Sheehy	Big Ten Player of the Year; 2017–18	Succeeded by Taro Hirose
Preceded by Eric Schierhorn	Big Ten Goaltender of the Year; 2017–18	Succeeded by Tommy Nappier
Preceded by Tanner Jaillet	Mike Richter Award; 2017–18	Succeeded by Cayden Primeau
Preceded by Peyton Jones	Big Ten Tournament MOP; 2018, 2019	Succeeded by Jack LaFontaine
