= Jimmy Snuggerud =

American ice hockey player (born 2004)

- Snuggerud playing for the Minnesota Golden Gophers in November 2024
- Born: June 1, 2004 (age 22) Chaska, Minnesota, U.S.
- Height: 6 ft 1 in (185 cm)
- Weight: 193 lb (88 kg; 13 st 11 lb)
- Position: Right wing
- Shoots: Right
- NHL team: St. Louis Blues
- NHL draft: 23rd overall, 2022; St. Louis Blues
- Playing career: 2025–present

Jimmy Snuggerud (born June 1, 2004) is an American professional ice hockey player who is a right winger for the St. Louis Blues of the National Hockey League (NHL). He was drafted 23rd overall by the Blues in the 2022 NHL entry draft. He played College ice hockey at the University of Minnesota.

== Playing career ==
Snuggerud spent two seasons with the USA Hockey National Team Development Program. During the 2021–22 season, he recorded 24 goals and 39 assists in 59 games. Snuggerud competed at the 2022 BioSteel All-American Game.

Snuggerud committed to play college ice hockey for the Minnesota Golden Gophers during the 2022–23 season. He was drafted 23rd overall by the St. Louis Blues in the 2022 NHL entry draft. On March 28, 2025, a day after the Golden Gophers were eliminated from the 2025 NCAA Division I men's ice hockey tournament, Snuggerud signed a three year, entry level-contact with the Blues. After the 2025–26 season he was named to the NHL All-Rookie Team.

== International play ==
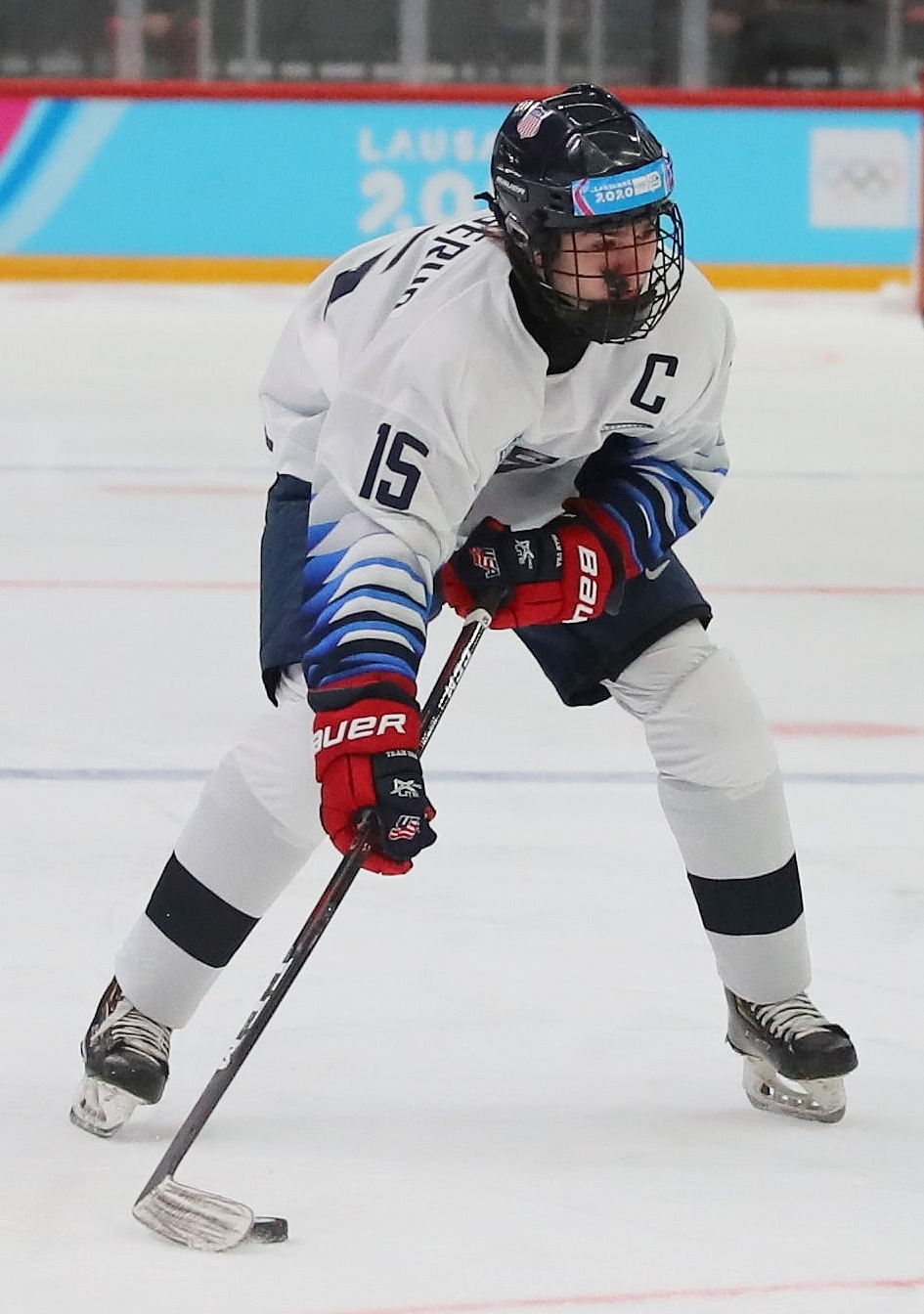
- Snuggerud at the 2020 Winter Youth Olympics

Medal record

Men's ice hockey

Representing the United States

World Junior Championships
Gold medal – first place	2024 Sweden	
Bronze medal – third place	2023 Canada	

World U18 Championships
Silver medal – second place	2022 Germany	

Snuggerud represented the United States at the 2020 Winter Youth Olympics where he served as captain and recorded two assists in four games and won a silver medal.

Snuggerud represented the United States at the 2022 World U18 Championships, where he recorded three goals and four assists in six games and won a silver medal.

On December 12, 2022, Snuggerud was named to the United States junior team to compete at the 2023 World Junior Championships. During the tournament he recorded five goals and eight assists in seven games and won a bronze medal.

On December 16, 2023, Snuggerud was again named to United States' roster to compete at the 2024 World Junior Championships. He recorded five goals and three assists in six games and won a gold medal.

== Personal life ==
Snuggerud's father, Dave and grandfather, Jim Westby, both played ice hockey and represented the United States at the Winter Olympics in 1964 and 1988, respectively. His cousin, Luc Snuggerud, is also a professional ice hockey player.

== Career statistics ==
=== Regular season and playoffs ===
			Regular season					Playoffs
Season	Team	League	GP	G	A	Pts	PIM	GP	G	A	Pts	PIM
2020–21	U.S. National Development Team	USHL	45	15	17	32	20	—	—	—	—	—
2021–22	U.S. National Development Team	USHL	59	24	39	63	32	—	—	—	—	—
2022–23	University of Minnesota	B1G	40	21	29	50	42	—	—	—	—	—
2023–24	University of Minnesota	B1G	39	21	13	34	42	—	—	—	—	—
2024–25	University of Minnesota	B1G	40	24	27	51	29	—	—	—	—	—
2024–25	St. Louis Blues	NHL	7	1	3	4	0	7	2	2	4	0
2025–26	St. Louis Blues	NHL	70	21	30	51	18	—	—	—	—	—
NHL totals			77	22	33	55	18	7	2	2	4	0

=== International ===
Year	Team	Event	Result	GP	G	A	Pts	PIM
2022	United States	U18	2nd place, silver medalist(s)	6	3	4	7	2
2023	United States	WJC	3rd place, bronze medalist(s)	7	5	8	13	2
2024	United States	WJC	1st place, gold medalist(s)	6	5	3	8	2
Junior totals				19	13	15	28	6

== Awards and honors ==
Award	Year	Ref
College
Big Ten Scoring Champion	2023	
All-Big TenSecond Team	2023	
All-Big TenFreshman Team	2023	
All-Big TenFirst Team	2024, 2025	
AHCA West Second Team All-American	2025	
League
NHL All-Rookie Team	2026	

Awards and achievements
Preceded by Zachary Bolduc	St. Louis Blues first-round draft pick 2022	Succeeded by Dalibor Dvorský
Preceded by Matty Beniers	Big Ten Scoring Champion; 2022–23; With: Logan Cooley	Succeeded by Gavin Brindley
