= Isaac Howard =

American ice hockey player (born 2004)

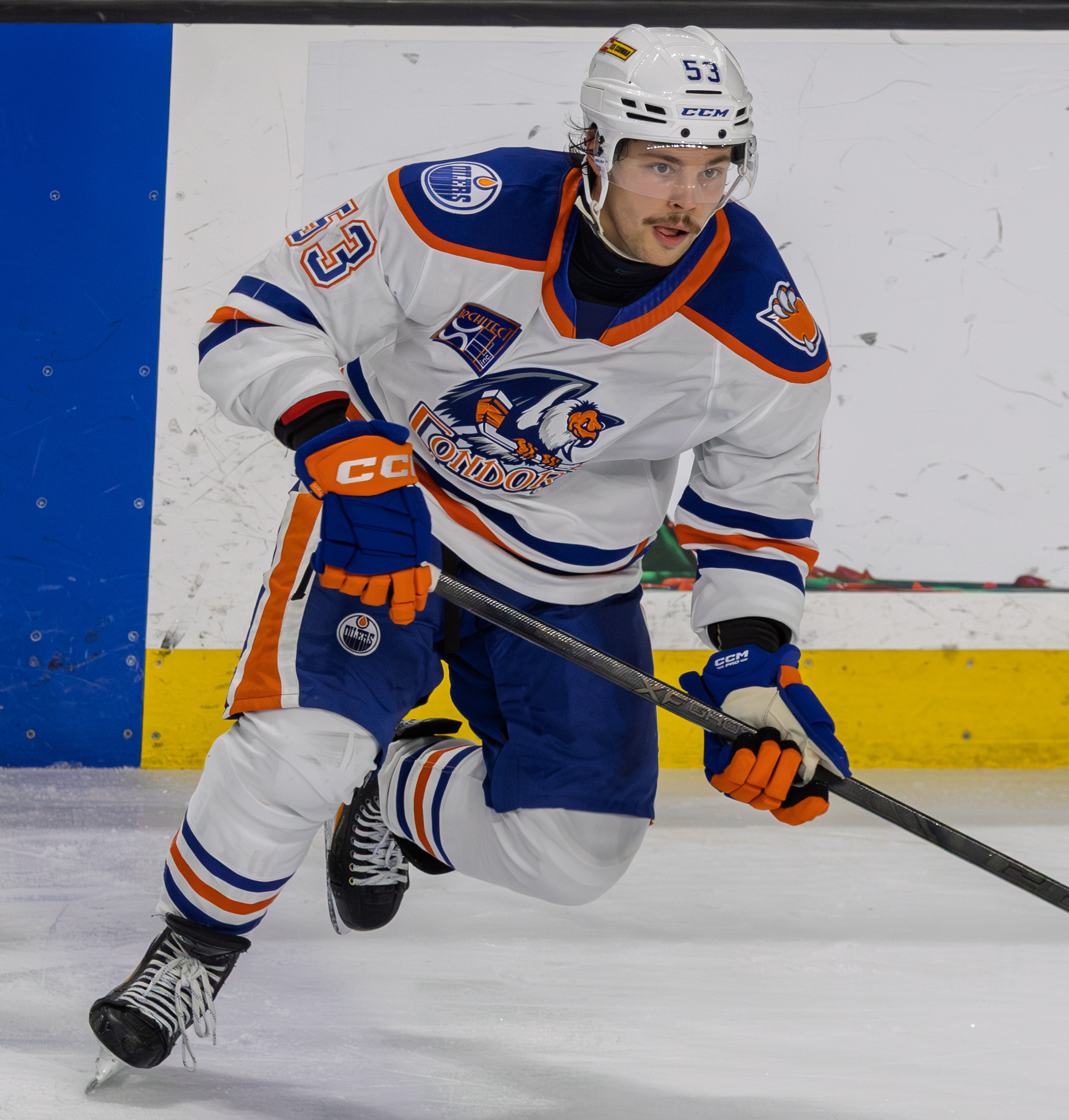
- Howard with the Bakersfield Condors in 2026
- Born: March 30, 2004 (age 22) Hudson, Wisconsin, U.S.
- Height: 5 ft 10 in (178 cm)
- Weight: 185 lb (84 kg; 13 st 3 lb)
- Position: Winger
- Shoots: Left
- NHL team: Edmonton Oilers
- National team: United States
- NHL draft: 31st overall, 2022; Tampa Bay Lightning
- Playing career: 2025–present

Isaac Howard (born March 30, 2004) is an American professional ice hockey player who is a winger for the Edmonton Oilers of the National Hockey League (NHL).

He played college ice hockey at Michigan State and won the Hobey Baker Award in 2024–25. He was drafted 31st overall by the Tampa Bay Lightning in the 2022 NHL entry draft.

== Playing career ==
Howard competed at the 2022 BioSteel All-American Game. He was drafted in the first round, 31st overall, by the Tampa Bay Lightning in the 2022 NHL entry draft.

=== College ===
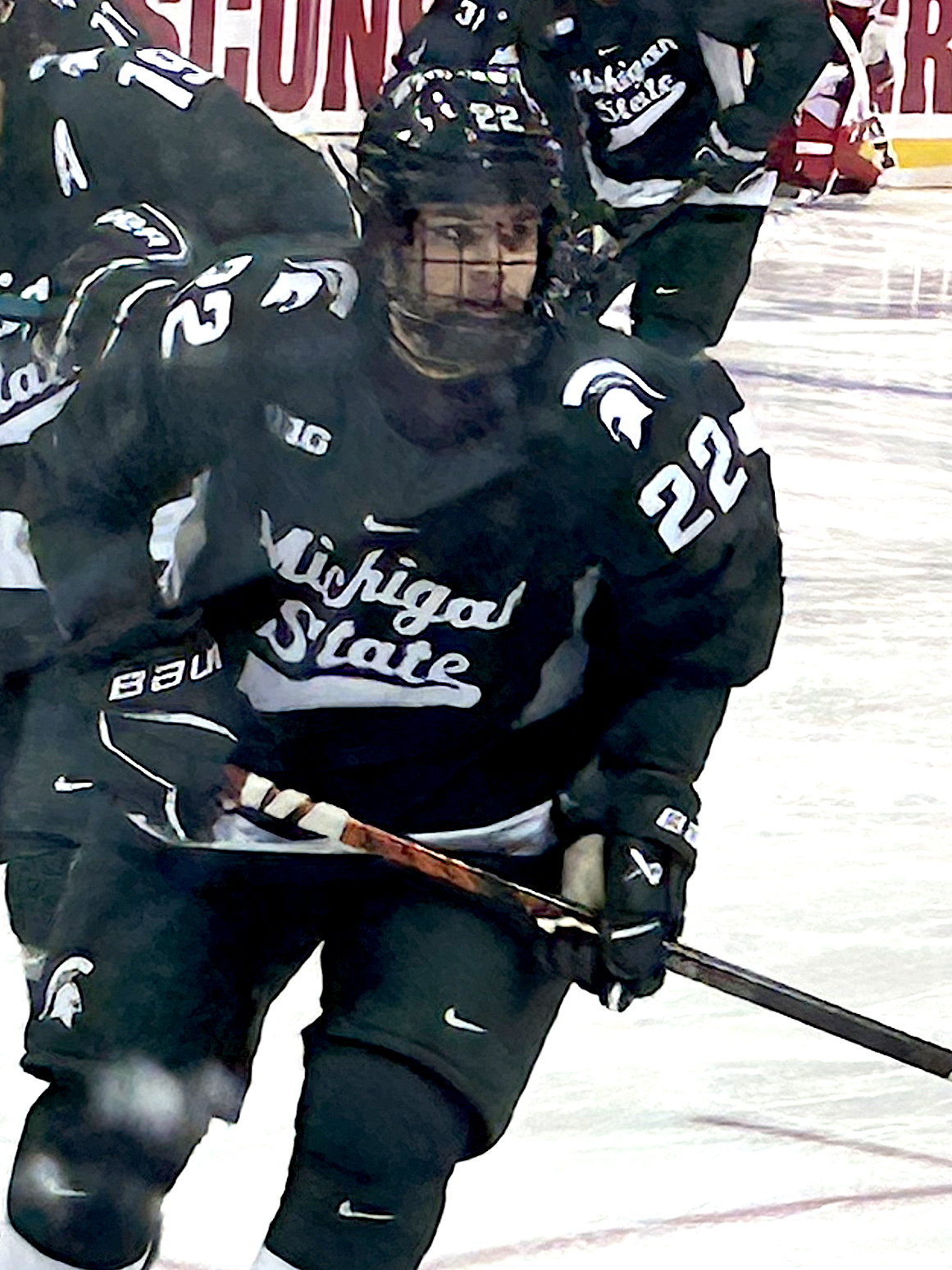
Howard with Michigan State in 2024

Howard began his college ice hockey career for the Minnesota Duluth Bulldogs during the 2022–23 season. During his freshman season he recorded six goals and 11 assists in 35 games.

On March 25, 2023, Howard announced he would transfer to Michigan State for the 2023–24 season. During his sophomore year he recorded eight goals and 28 assists in 36 games.

During the 2024–25 season, in his junior year, he recorded 26 goals and 26 assists in 37 games. During conference play he led the Big Ten Conference in scoring with 16 goals and 17 assists in 24 games. Following the season he was named the Big Ten Player of the Year and the Big Ten Scoring Champion. He also won the Hobey Baker Award. During the 2025 Big Ten tournament, he recorded three goals and two assists in two games, including the game-winning goal in double-overtime to help Michigan State win their second consecutive Big Ten tournament championship. He was subsequently named to the Big Ten All-Tournament Team and Big Ten Tournament MVP.

=== Professional ===
On July 8, 2025, Howard's NHL rights were traded to the Edmonton Oilers in exchange for Sam O'Reilly. He then signed a three-year, entry-level contract with the Oilers, beginning during the 2025–26 season. He scored his first NHL goal on October 21, in a 3–2 overtime win against the Ottawa Senators.

Howard played the first 13 games of the 2026–27 season with the Oilers, being sidelined after New York Islanders defenseman Emil Heineman unintentionally collided into Howard's knee. After recovering, Howard was reassigned to the Bakersfield Condors on November 16.

== International play ==
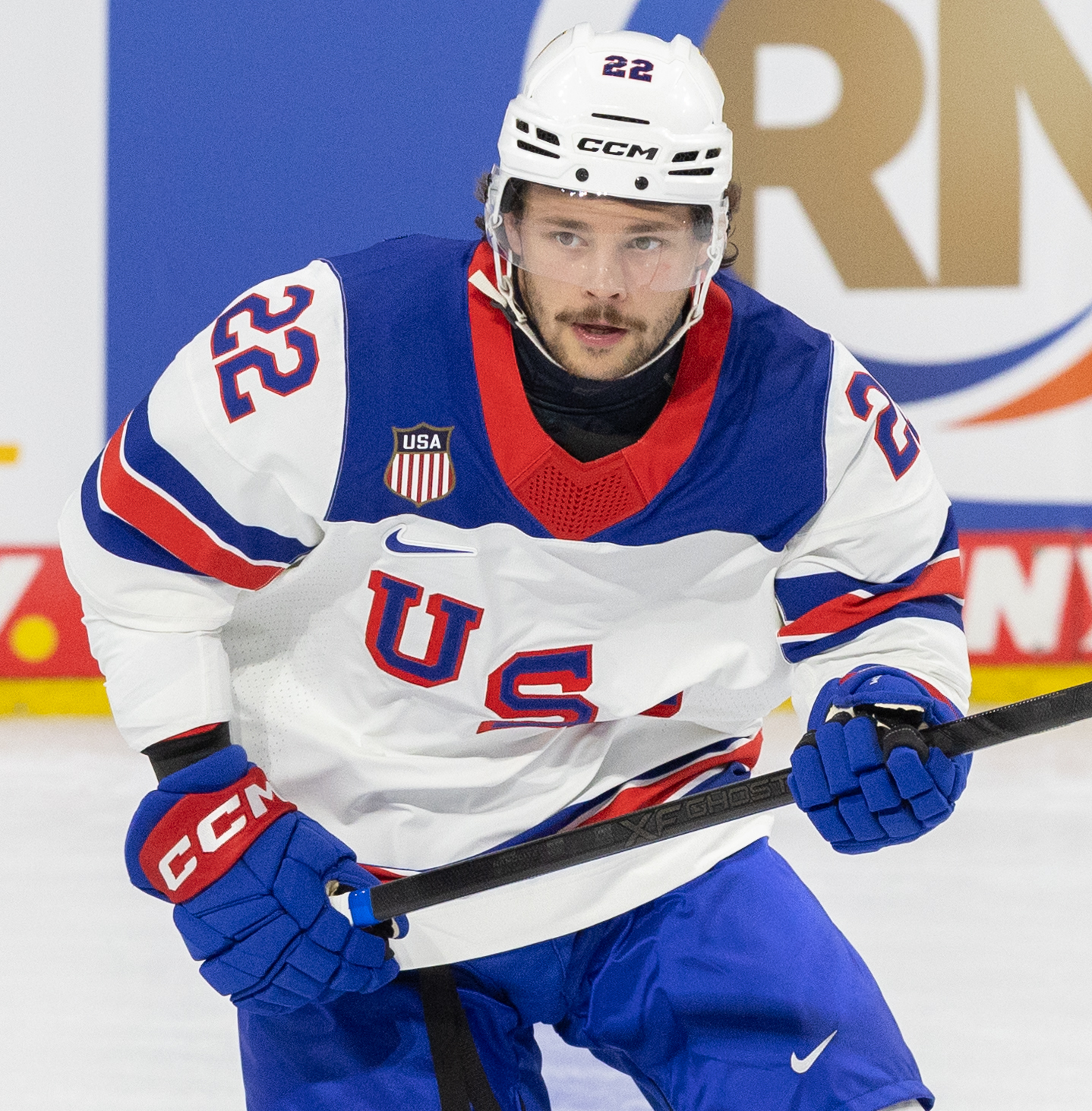
- Howard with Team USA in 2026

Medal record

Men's ice hockey

Representing the United States

World Championships
Gold medal – first place	2025 Sweden/Denmark	

Youth Olympic Games
Silver medal – second place	2020 Lausanne	

World Junior Championships
Gold medal – first place	2024 Sweden	

World U18 Championships
Silver medal – second place	2022 Germany	

Howard represented the United States at the 2020 Winter Youth Olympics and won a silver medal.

Howard represented the United States at the 2021 World U18 Championships, where he recorded one goal and three assists in five games. He later represented the United States at the 2022 World U18 Championships, where he was the leading scorer for the United States, with six goals and five assists in six games and won a silver medal.

On December 16, 2023, Howard was named to the United States roster to compete at the 2024 World Junior Championships. He recorded a team-leading seven goals and two assists in seven games and won a gold medal.

Howard made his senior national team debut for the United States at the 2025 World Championship, where he recorded one assist in four games and helped the team win its first gold medal since 1933.

On May 7, 2026, Howard was added to the United States roster for the 2026 World Championship.

== Career statistics ==
=== Regular season and playoffs ===
			Regular season					Playoffs
Season	Team	League	GP	G	A	Pts	PIM	GP	G	A	Pts	PIM
2020–21	U.S. National Development Team	USHL	51	32	41	73	4	—	—	—	—	—
2021–22	U.S. National Development Team	USHL	60	33	49	82	42	—	—	—	—	—
2022–23	University of Minnesota Duluth	NCHC	35	6	11	17	25	—	—	—	—	—
2023–24	Michigan State University	B1G	36	8	28	36	10	—	—	—	—	—
2024–25	Michigan State University	B1G	37	26	26	52	10	—	—	—	—	—
2025–26	Edmonton Oilers	NHL	29	2	3	5	12	—	—	—	—	—
2025–26	Bakersfield Condors	AHL	47	24	26	50	12	3	0	4	4	0
2026–27	Edmonton Oilers	NHL	13	1	2	3	2	—	—	—	—	—
NHL totals			42	3	5	8	14	—	—	—	—	—

=== International ===
Year	Team	Event	Result	GP	G	A	Pts	PIM
2021	United States	U18	5th	5	1	3	4	0
2022	United States	U18	2nd place, silver medalist(s)	6	6	5	11	2
2024	United States	WJC	1st place, gold medalist(s)	7	7	2	9	0
2025	United States	WC	1st place, gold medalist(s)	4	0	1	1	0
2026	United States	WC	8th	8	3	1	4	2
Junior totals				18	14	10	24	2
Senior totals				12	3	2	5	2

== Awards and honors ==
Award	Year	Ref
College
All-Big Ten First Team	2025	
Big Ten Scoring Champion	2025	
Big Ten Player of the Year	2025	
Big Ten All-Tournament Team	2025	
Big Ten Tournament MVP	2025	
Hobey Baker Award	2025	
AHCA West First Team All-American	2025	
AHL
All-Rookie Team	2026	

Awards and achievements
Preceded by Nolan Foote	Tampa Bay Lightning first-round draft pick 2022	Succeeded by Incumbent
Preceded by Gavin Brindley	Big Ten Scoring Champion; 2024–25	Succeeded by Gavin McKenna
Preceded by Gavin Brindley	Big Ten Player of the Year; 2024–25	Succeeded by T. J. Hughes
Preceded by Trey Augustine	Big Ten Tournament MOP; 2025	Succeeded by T. J. Hughes
Preceded by Macklin Celebrini	Hobey Baker Award; 2024–25	Succeeded by Max Plante
