= Big Ten Scoring Champion =

- Sport: Ice hockey
- Awarded for: To the player with the most points scored in conference games during the season.

History
- First award: 2015
- Most recent: Gavin McKenna

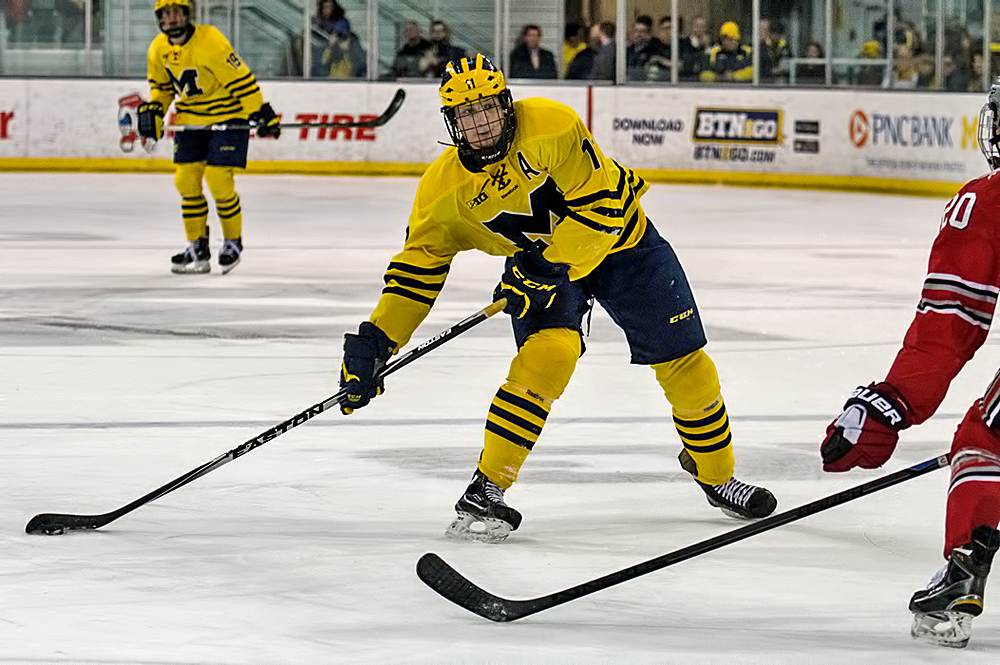
Inaugural Big Ten scoring champion Zach Hyman

The Big Ten Scoring Champion is an annual award given out at the conclusion of the Big Ten Conference regular season to the player who scored the most points in conference games during the season.

The Scoring Champion was first awarded in 2015 and every year thereafter. It has been shared twice, in 2017 and 2023. Cole Caufield is the only player to win the award multiple times.

== Award winners ==
Year	Winner	Position	School	Points	Ref
2014–15	Zach Hyman	Left wing	Michigan	33	
2015–16	Kyle Connor	Left wing	Michigan	43	
2016–17	Tyler Sheehy	Forward	Minnesota	34	
2016–17	Mason Jobst	Forward	Ohio State	34	
2017–18	Cooper Marody	Center	Michigan	27	
2018–19	Taro Hirose	Left wing	Michigan State	34	
2019–20	Cole Caufield	Right wing	Wisconsin	24	
2020–21	Cole Caufield	Right wing	Wisconsin	43	
2021–22	Matty Beniers	Center	Michigan	27	
2022–23	Logan Cooley	Center	Minnesota	36	
2022–23	Jimmy Snuggerud	Right wing	Minnesota	36	
2023–24	Gavin Brindley	Right wing	Michigan	29	
2024–25	Isaac Howard	Left wing	Michigan State	33	
2025–26	Gavin McKenna	Left wing	Penn State	38	

=== Winners by school ===
School	Winners
Michigan	5
Minnesota	3
Michigan State	2
Wisconsin	2
Ohio State	1
Penn State	1

=== Winners by position ===
Position	Winners
Center	3
Right wing	4
Left wing	5
Forward	2
Defenceman	0
Goaltender	0
