= Big Ten Men's Ice Hockey Player of the Year =

Big Ten Player of the Year
- Sport: Ice hockey
- Awarded for: The Player of the Year in the Big Ten

History
- First award: 2014
- Most recent: T. J. Hughes

The Big Ten Player of the Year is an annual award given out at the conclusion of the Big Ten regular season to the best player in the conference as voted by a media panel and the head coaches of each team.

The Player of the Year was first awarded in 2014 and is a successor to the CCHA Player of the Year which was discontinued after the conference dissolved due to the 2013–14 NCAA conference realignment.

== Award winners ==
| Year | Winner | Position | School |
|---|---|---|---|
| 2013–14 | Adam Wilcox | Goaltender | Minnesota |
| 2014–15 | Jake Hildebrand | Goaltender | Michigan State |
| 2015–16 | Kyle Connor | Left wing | Michigan |
| 2016–17 | Tyler Sheehy | Center | Minnesota |
| 2017–18 | Cale Morris | Goaltender | Notre Dame |
| 2018–19 | Taro Hirose | Left wing | Michigan State |
| 2019–20 | Cole Hults | Defenseman | Penn State |
| 2020–21 | Cole Caufield | Right wing | Wisconsin |
| 2021–22 | Ben Meyers | Center | Minnesota |
| 2022–23 | Matthew Knies | Left wing | Minnesota |
| 2023–24 | Gavin Brindley | Right wing | Michigan |
| 2024–25 | Isaac Howard | Left wing | Michigan State |
| 2025–26 | T. J. Hughes | Center | Michigan |

=== Winners by school ===
| School | Winners |
|---|---|
| Minnesota | 4 |
| Michigan | 3 |
| Michigan State | 3 |
| Notre Dame | 1 |
| Penn State | 1 |
| Wisconsin | 1 |

=== Winners by position ===
| Position | Winners |
|---|---|
| Center | 3 |
| Right wing | 2 |
| Left wing | 4 |
| Defenceman | 1 |
| Goaltender | 3 |

== See also ==
- Big Ten Awards
- List of CCHA Player of the Year
- List of WCHA Player of the Year
