= Logan Cooley =

American ice hockey player (born 2004)

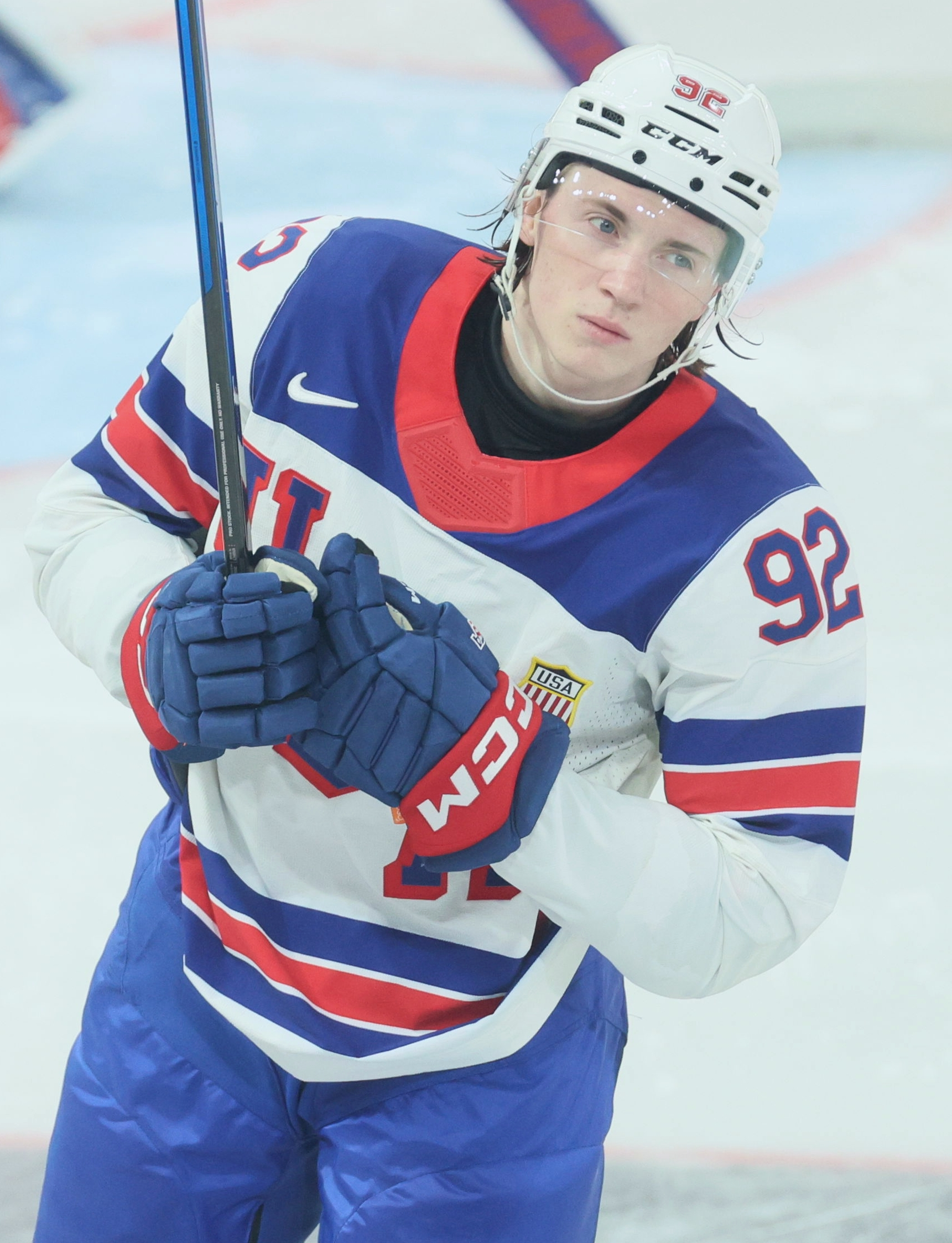
- Cooley with the United States in 2025
- Born: May 4, 2004 (age 22) Pittsburgh, Pennsylvania, U.S.
- Height: 6 ft 0 in (183 cm)
- Weight: 191 lb (87 kg; 13 st 9 lb)
- Position: Center
- Shoots: Left
- NHL team Former teams: Utah Mammoth; Arizona Coyotes
- National team: United States
- NHL draft: 3rd overall, 2022; Arizona Coyotes
- Playing career: 2023–present

Logan Cooley (born May 4, 2004) is an American professional ice hockey player who is a center for the Utah Mammoth of the National Hockey League (NHL). He was drafted third overall by the Arizona Coyotes in the 2022 NHL entry draft.

== Playing career ==
Cooley played for the U.S. national U18 team. Before committing to the University of Minnesota, Cooley had previously committed to the University of Notre Dame. In his first year with Minnesota during the 2022–23 NCAA season, Cooley recorded 22 goals and 38 assists for 60 points in 39 games.

Before the 2022 NHL entry draft, Cooley ranked between second and fifth by sports media among draft prospects. He was drafted third overall by the Arizona Coyotes. In May 2023, he announced that he intended to return to Minnesota for the following season. Despite his previous announcement of returning to Minnesota, Cooley signed a three-year, entry-level contract with the Coyotes on July 27, 2023. Cooley impressed during the Coyotes 2023 training camp and made the opening day roster, playing in his first NHL game, a 4–3 shootout win over the New Jersey Devils. Cooley had two assists in the game, setting up the game-tying goal by Nick Schmaltz. Cooley scored his first NHL goal against Lukáš Dostál of the Anaheim Ducks in a 4–3 loss on November 1.

Shortly after the end of the 2023–24 season, the Coyotes' franchise was suspended and team assets were subsequently transferred to the expansion team Utah Hockey Club; as a result, Cooley became a member of the Utah team.

On October 29, 2025, Cooley signed an eight-year extension with Utah, worth an average annual value (AAV) of $10 million, that will start at the beginning of the 2026–27 NHL season. On November 25, Cooley scored a career-high four goals and five points to lead the Mammoth to a 5–1 win over the Vegas Golden Knights. He subsequently became the first player in Mammoth history to score four goals in one game. During the 2026 Stanley Cup playoffs, Cooley scored his and the Mammoth's first playoff goal in the dying seconds of the first period of game one against the Vegas Golden Knights off a cross-ice feed from Nate Schmidt.

== International play ==
Medal record

Men's ice hockey

Representing the United States

World Championships
Gold medal – first place	2025 Sweden/Denmark	

World Junior Championships
Bronze medal – third place	2023 Canada	

World U18 Championships
Silver medal – second place	2022 Germany	

On December 12, 2022, Cooley was named to the United States men's national junior ice hockey team to compete in the 2023 World Junior Championships. During the tournament, he recorded seven goals and seven assists in seven games and won a bronze medal.

Cooley made his senior national team debut for the United States at the 2025 World Championship, where he recorded four goals and eight assists in ten games and helped the team win its first gold medal since 1933.

== Personal life ==
Cooley is from the borough of West Mifflin in the greater Pittsburgh area. With his third-overall selection in the 2022 NHL entry draft, he became the highest-drafted player to date from the Pittsburgh area, surpassing previous first-round picks J. T. Miller (15th overall) and R. J. Umberger (16th overall).

Despite being a Pittsburgh native and getting his start in hockey through Sidney Crosby's Little Penguins program, Cooley has stated that he grew up a Washington Capitals and Alexander Ovechkin fan.

Cooley's cousin, L.J. Mooney, is an ice hockey player who was drafted in the fourth round (113th overall) of the 2025 draft and committed to play college ice hockey at Minnesota.

== Career statistics ==
=== Regular season and playoffs ===
			Regular season					Playoffs
Season	Team	League	GP	G	A	Pts	PIM	GP	G	A	Pts	PIM
2020–21	U.S. National Development Team	USHL	27	15	13	28	10	—	—	—	—	—
2021–22	U.S. National Development Team	USHL	24	13	23	36	55	—	—	—	—	—
2022–23	University of Minnesota	B1G	39	22	38	60	42	—	—	—	—	—
2023–24	Arizona Coyotes	NHL	82	20	24	44	18	—	—	—	—	—
2024–25	Utah Hockey Club	NHL	75	25	40	65	46	—	—	—	—	—
2025–26	Utah Mammoth	NHL	54	24	19	43	28	6	2	1	3	10
NHL totals			211	69	83	152	92	6	2	1	3	10

=== International ===
Year	Team	Event	Result	GP	G	A	Pts	PIM
2021	United States	U18	5th	5	0	2	2	0
2022	United States	U18	2nd place, silver medalist(s)	6	3	7	10	4
2022	United States	WJC	5th	5	2	4	6	4
2023	United States	WJC	3rd place, bronze medalist(s)	7	7	7	14	2
2025	United States	WC	1st place, gold medalist(s)	10	4	8	12	10
Junior totals				23	12	20	32	10
Senior totals				10	4	8	12	10

== Awards and honors ==
Award	Year	Ref
College
Big Ten Scoring Champion	2023	
All-Big Ten First Team	2023	
All-Big Ten Freshman Team	2023	
Big Ten All-Tournament Team	2023	
AHCA West First Team All-American	2023	
NCAA All-Tournament Team	2023	
NHL
NHL All-Rookie Team	2024	

Awards and achievements
Preceded by Dylan Guenther	Arizona Coyotes first-round draft pick 2022	Succeeded by Conor Geekie
Preceded by Matty Beniers	Big Ten Scoring Champion; 2022–23; With: Jimmy Snuggerud	Succeeded by Incumbent
