= Faceoff on the Lake =

2023 collegiate ice hockey game

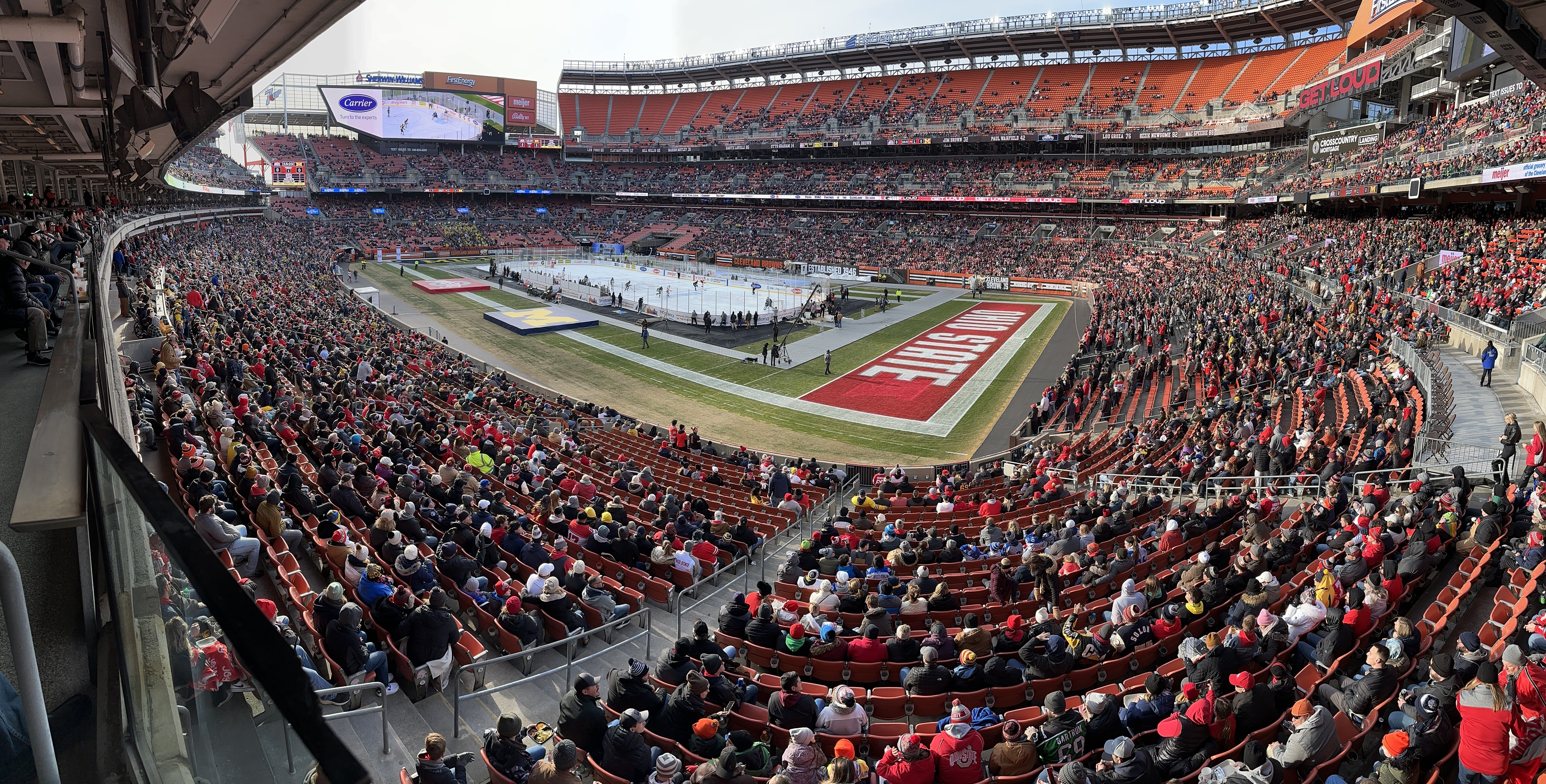
| | 1 | 2 | 3 | Total |
|---|---|---|---|---|
| Michigan | 0 | 1 | 1 | 2 |
| Ohio State | 0 | 3 | 1 | 4 |
- Date: February 18, 2023
- Venue: FirstEnergy Stadium
- City: Cleveland, Ohio
- Attendance: 45,523

The Faceoff on the Lake was an outdoor college ice hockey game played on February 18, 2023, at FirstEnergy Stadium in Cleveland between longtime rivals the Michigan Wolverines and the Ohio State Buckeyes. Ohio State defeated Michigan 4–2 in a rematch of the Frozen Diamond Faceoff outdoor game between the teams in 2012. The game marked the first ice hockey game ever played at FirstEnergy Stadium, and the attendance, announced at 45,523 fans, set a record for an outdoor college hockey game held at a neutral site.

== Teams ==
The game was announced by the Haslam Sports Group on August 22, 2022, as the first outdoor ice hockey game held at FirstEnergy Stadium and the first outdoor ice hockey game in Cleveland since 2012. This was the 41st outdoor college hockey game in the modern era. Michigan and Ohio State had previously played an outdoor game in Cleveland at Progressive Field on January 15, 2012, when the Wolverines defeated the Buckeyes 4–1 in the Frozen Diamond Faceoff.

=== Michigan Wolverines ===
The No. 4 Michigan Wolverines entered the game with a record of 20–9–2, and a 12–8–1 record in conference play. This was the Wolverines ninth outdoor game in their history, the most of any college ice hockey team.

=== Ohio State Buckeyes ===
The No. 10 Ohio State Buckeyes entered the game with a record of 17–11–3, and a 10–9–2 record in conference play. This was the Buckeyes fourth outdoor game in their history.

== Game summary ==
| February 18, 2023 | Michigan Wolverines | 2–4 | Ohio State Buckeyes | FirstEnergy Stadium | Recap |

The game was scoreless in the first period. Ohio State scored three goals in the second period, via goals by Cole McWard, a power play goal by Jake Wise and a shorthanded goal by Tyler Duke. Michigan finally got on the board late in the second via a goal by Gavin Brindley at 18:25. Michigan reduced Ohio State's lead to one goal via a goal by Eric Ciccolini at 8:46 in the third period. Ohio State responded with a goal by Stephen Halliday less than a minute later. The attendance of 45,523 was the largest in Ohio State history, surpassing the previous record of 45,021 set at the Hockey City Classic at TCF Bank Stadium on January 17, 2014.

Ohio State wore throwback jerseys featuring colors and numbers that resembled the Ohio State Buckeyes football team's jerseys of the early 1940s.

Scoring summary
| Period | Team | Goal | Assist(s) | Time | Score |
|---|---|---|---|---|---|
| 1st | No scoring | | | | |
| 2nd | OSU | Cole McWard (4) | Joe Dunlap (8), Matt Cassidy (11) | 14:21 | 1–0 OSU |
| 2nd | OSU | Jake Wise (11) (PP) | Travis Treloar (11), Stephen Halliday (25) | 17:11 | 2–0 OSU |
| 2nd | MICH | Gavin Brindley (9) | Adam Fantilli (30) | 18:25 | 2–1 OSU |
| 2nd | OSU | Tyler Duke (3) (SH) | Jake Wise (16) | 19:10 | 3–1 OSU |
| 3rd | MICH | Eric Ciccolini (6) | Jackson Hallum (9), Frank Nazar (1) | 8:46 | 3–2 OSU |
| 3rd | OSU | Stephen Halliday (8) (PP) | Jake Wise (17), Mason Lohrei (22) | 8:46 | 4–2 OSU |

Number in parentheses represents the player's total in goals or assists to that point of the season

Penalty summary
| Period | Team | Player | Penalty | Time | PIM |
|---|---|---|---|---|---|
| 1st | OSU | Matt Cassidy | Hitting from behind | 3:39 | 2:00 |
| 1st | OSU | Tyler Duke | Holding | 8:37 | 2:00 |
| 1st | MICH | Steven Holtz | Hitting from behind | 11:33 | 2:00 |
| 1st | MICH | Jackson Hallum | Tripping | 14:05 | 2:00 |
| 1st | OSU | Joe Dunlap | Roughing | 16:43 | 2:00 |
| 1st | MICH | Erik Portillo | Tripping | 17:47 | 2:00 |
| 2nd | OSU | Jaedon Leslie | Slashing | 4:53 | 2:00 |
| 2nd | MICH | Gavin Brindley | Slashing | 10:50 | 2:00 |
| 2nd | MICH | Mackie Samoskevich | Cross-checking | 16:37 | 2:00 |
| 2nd | OSU | Mason Lohrei | Holding | 18:55 | 2:00 |
| 3rd | OSU | Cole McWard | Tripping | 1:10 | 2:00 |
| 3rd | MICH | Nolan Moyle | Interference | 9:06 | 2:00 |
| 3rd | OSU | Michael Gildon | Tripping | 12:15 | 2:00 |

Shots by period
| Team | 1 | 2 | 3 | Total |
|---|---|---|---|---|
| Michigan | 7 | 10 | 20 | 37 |
| Ohio State | 14 | 13 | 7 | 34 |

Power play opportunities
| Team | Goals/Opportunities |
|---|---|
| Michigan | 0/7 |
| Ohio State | 2/6 |

== Team rosters ==
Michigan
| # | | Player | Position |
|---|---|---|---|
| 1 | (Sweden) | Erik Portillo | G |
| 2 | (United States) | Rutger McGroarty | LW |
| 4 | (United States) | Gavin Brindley | RW |
| 11 | (United States) | Mackie Samoskevich | RW |
| 13 | (Canada) | T. J. Hughes | C |
| 19 | (Canada) | Adam Fantilli | C |
| 20 | (United States) | Keaton Pehrson | D |
| 21 | (United States) | Jackson Hallum | LW |
| 22 | (United States) | Philippe Lapointe | LW |
| 24 | (United States) | Steven Holtz | D |
| 25 | (United States) | Dylan Duke | LW |
| 26 | (United States) | Seamus Casey | D |
| 27 | (United States) | Nolan Moyle | RW |
| 31 | (United States) | Noah West | G |
| 63 | (Canada) | Luca Fantilli | D |
| 71 | (United States) | Nick Granowicz | C |
| 73 | (Canada) | Ethan Edwards | D |
| 90 | (United States) | Jay Keranen | D |
| 91 | (United States) | Frank Nazar | C |
| 93 | (Canada) | Eric Ciccolini | RW |
| 94 | (United States) | Mark Estapa | LW |
Head coach: (United States) Brandon Naurato

Ohio State
| # | | Player | Position |
|---|---|---|---|
| 2 | (United States) | James Marooney | D |
| 3 | (United States) | Cole McWard | D |
| 5 | (United States) | Tyler Duke | D |
| 6 | (United States) | Mason Lohrei | D |
| 8 | (United States) | Scooter Brickey | D |
| 11 | (United States) | Kamil Sadlocha | C |
| 13 | (United States) | Tate Singleton | F |
| 14 | (United States) | Dalton Messina | F |
| 15 | (United States) | Cam Thiesing | C |
| 18 | (United States) | Michael Gildon | LW |
| 19 | (Canada) | Stephen Halliday | C |
| 20 | (United States) | Matt Cassidy | RW |
| 21 | (United States) | Joe Dunlap | F |
| 23 | (United States) | Davis Burnside | F |
| 26 | (Canada) | Jaedon Leslie | F |
| 28 | (United States) | Jake Wise | C |
| 44 | (Czech Republic) | Jakub Dobeš | G |
| 65 | (United States) | C. J. Regula | D |
| 71 | (United States) | Patrick Guzzo | LW |
| 94 | (Sweden) | Travis Treloar | C |
Head coach: (United States) Steve Rohlik

West served as reserve goaltender and did not see playing time.

=== Scratches ===
- Michigan Wolverines: Brendan Miles, Jacob Truscott, Tyler Shea, Kienan Draper, Luke Hughes, Johnny Druskinis
- Ohio State Buckeyes: John Larkin, Evan McIntyre, Dominic Vidoli, Mark Cheremeta, Gustaf Westlund, Ryan Snowden, Reilly Herbst

=== Officials ===
- Referees — Brian Aaron, David Marcotte
- Linesmen — Justin Cornell, Jake Davis

== Television ==
The game was broadcast nationally by the Big Ten Network, and available online streaming via FuboTV.

== See also ==
- List of outdoor ice hockey games
