= 2020–21 USHL season =

2020–21 USHL Season
- League: United States Hockey League
- Sport: Ice hockey
- Duration: November 6, 2020 – April 24, 2021
- Games: 49–54
- Teams: 14

Draft
- Top draft pick: Owen Gallatin
- Picked by: Madison Capitols

Regular season
- Anderson Cup: Chicago Steel
- Season MVP: Sean Farrell (Chicago Steel)
- Top scorer: Sean Farrell (Chicago Steel)

Clark Cup Playoffs
- Clark Cup Playoffs MVP: Adam Fantilli (Steel)
- Finals champions: Chicago Steel
- Runners-up: Fargo Force

USHL seasons
- 2019–20 2021–22

The 2020–21 USHL season was the 42nd season of the United States Hockey League as an all-junior league.

Due to the onset of the COVID-19 pandemic, the previous season was curtailed on March 12, 2020, without holding a playoff or awarding a Clark Cup champion. As pandemic-related restrictions were still in effect, the start of the 2020–21 season was delayed to November 2020.

During the offseason, the Cedar Rapids RoughRiders' home arena was damaged during the August 10 derecho, forcing the team to suspend operations for at least the 2020–21 season. The Madison Capitols chose to not participate due to pandemic restrictions in Madison, Wisconsin.

The regular season ran from November 6, 2020, to April 24, 2021, with a 54-game schedule for each team. Due to pandemic safety protocols, several games were postponed or cancelled, with six of the fourteen teams completing all 54 games. For the second consecutive season, the Chicago Steel were awarded the Anderson Cup for accumulating 81 points in 54 games for a 0.750 points percentage. The Steel also won the Clark Cup playoff championship.

== Regular season ==
Due to the unbalanced schedule during the COVID-19 pandemic, the league ranked teams on points percentage.

Final standings:

=== Eastern Conference ===
Team	GP	W	L	OTL	SOL	PTS	PCT	GF	GA
z – Chicago Steel	54	38	11	3	2	81	0.750	265	185
x – Muskegon Lumberjacks	54	34	16	2	2	72	0.667	241	209
x – Green Bay Gamblers	51	30	17	2	2	64	0.627	190	182
x – Dubuque Fighting Saints	52	24	23	4	1	53	0.510	199	212
Team USA	54	22	24	4	4	52	0.481	226	245
Youngstown Phantoms	49	12	30	5	2	31	0.316	145	218

=== Western Conference ===
Team	GP	W	L	OTL	SOL	PTS	PCT	GF	GA
y – Tri-City Storm	52	30	18	3	1	64	0.615	178	137
x – Omaha Lancers	53	30	20	2	1	63	0.594	169	156
x – Sioux City Musketeers	53	31	21	1	0	63	0.594	160	125
x – Fargo Force	54	31	21	3	0	63	0.583	169	148
Des Moines Buccaneers	51	26	21	4	0	56	0.549	158	152
Lincoln Stars	54	22	28	3	1	48	0.444	160	204
Waterloo Black Hawks	53	22	30	1	0	45	0.425	165	202
Sioux Falls Stampede	54	18	32	3	1	40	0.370	163	213

x = clinched playoff berth; y = clinched conference title; z = clinched regular season title

== Statistical leaders ==
=== Scoring leaders ===
Players are listed by points, then goals.

Note: GP = Games played; G = Goals; A = Assists; Pts. = Points; PIM = Penalty minutes

Player	Team	GP	G	A	Pts	PIM
Sean Farrell	Chicago Steel	53	29	72	101	54
Matt Coronato	Chicago Steel	51	48	37	85	57
Josh Doan	Chicago Steel	53	31	39	70	45
Erik Middendorf	Chicago Steel	53	32	36	68	19
Danil Gushchin	Muskegon Lumberjacks	46	32	32	64	42
Mason Lohrei	Green Bay Gamblers	48	19	40	59	74
Cameron Berg	Muskegon Lumberjacks	51	27	31	58	18
Ayrton Martino	Omaha Lancers	38	18	38	56	12
Cristophe Tellier	Muskegon Lumberjacks	53	22	32	54	34
Robert Cronin	Dubuque Fighting Saints	48	28	25	53	54
Jake Schmaltz	Green Bay Gamblers	51	19	34	53	16

=== Leading goaltenders ===
Note: GP = Games played; Mins = Minutes played; W = Wins; L = Losses; OTL = Overtime losses; SOL = Shootout losses; SO = Shutouts; GAA = Goals against average; SV% = Save percentage

Player	Team	GP	Mins	W	L	OTL	SOL	SO	GAA	SV%
Akira Schmid	Sioux City Musketeers	36	2147	22	13	1	0	3	2.01	0.921
Todd Scott	Tri-City Storm	39	2181	22	10	2	1	2	2.37	0.910
Brennan Boynton	Fargo Force	46	2540	26	16	1	0	3	2.43	0.901
Jakub Dobeš	Omaha Lancers	47	2588	26	16	2	1	2	2.48	0.908
Remington Keopple	Des Moines Buccaneers	25	1350	11	9	3	0	1	2.76	0.900

== Clark Cup playoffs ==
Final results:

Conference Semifinals (Best-of-3)
E1	Chicago	2
E4	Dubuque	0
Eastern Conference
E2	Muskegon	2
E3	Green Bay	0
W1	Tri-City	1
W4	Fargo	2
Western Conference
W2	Omaha	0
W3	Sioux City	2

Conference Finals (Best-of-3)
E1	Chicago	2
E2	Muskegon	0
W3	Sioux City	0
W4	Fargo	2

Clark Cup Championship (Best-of-5)
E1	Chicago	3
W4	Fargo	1

== Conference Semifinals ==
=== Eastern Conference ===
==== (E1) Chicago Steel vs. (E4) Dubuque Fighting Saints ====
April 30	Chicago Steel	2 – 1	Dubuque Fighting Saints	Fox Valley Ice Arena
No scoring		First period	Braden Doyle (1) - 1:18
10:04 - Erik Middendorf (1); 19:51 - Matt Coronato (1)		Second period	No scoring
No scoring		Third period	No scoring
Simon Latkoczy (29 saves / 30 shots)		Goalie stats	Lukáš Pařík (27 saves / 29 shots)

May 1	Chicago Steel	6 – 1	Dubuque Fighting Saints	Fox Valley Ice Arena
13:50 - pp - Mackie Samoskevich (1); 18:45 - Ryan Ufko (1)		First period	No scoring
1:45 - Matt Coronato (2); 9:08 - pp - Sean Farrell (1); 17:52 - Adam Fantilli (1)		Second period	Kenny Connors (1) - pp - 5:26
4:46 - pp - Matt Coronato (3)		Third period	No scoring
Simon Latkoczy (24 saves / 25 shots)		Goalie stats	Lukáš Pařík (40 saves / 46 shots)

Chicago wins series 2 – 0

==== (E2) Muskegon Lumberjacks vs. (E3) Green Bay Gamblers ====
April 30	Muskegon Lumberjacks	3 – 2	Green Bay Gamblers	Mercy Health Arena
1:54 - Cristophe Tellier (1); 8:29 - Cameron Berg (1)		First period	Jackson Hallum (1) - 8:48
No scoring		Second period	Jesse Tucker (1) - pp - 12:50
19:22 - Bradley Marek (1)		Third period	No scoring
Jan Škorpík (21 saves / 23 shots)		Goalie stats	Matt Davis (28 saves / 31 shots)

May 1	Muskegon Lumberjacks	3 – 1	Green Bay Gamblers	Mercy Health Arena
No scoring		First period	No scoring
6:24 - Danil Gushchin (1)		Second period	No scoring
15:05 - Cristophe Tellier (2); 19:15 - en - Cameron Berg (2)		Third period	Mason Lohrei (1) - 5:27
Jan Škorpík (26 saves / 27 shots)		Goalie stats	Matt Davis (31 saves / 33 shots)

Muskegon wins series 2 – 0

=== Western Conference ===
==== (W1) Tri-City Storm vs. (W4) Fargo Force ====
April 30	Tri-City Storm	3 – 2	Fargo Force	Viaero Center
10:12 - pp - Cole McWard (1)		First period	Jack Peart (1) - pp - 17:40
No scoring		Second period	Bear Hughes (1) - 7:03
11:30 - pp - Hunter Strand (1); 15:31 - pp - Mark Estapa (1)		Third period	No scoring
Todd Scott (13 saves / 15 shots)		Goalie stats	Brennan Boynton (20 saves / 23 shots)

May 1	Tri-City Storm	4 – 5	OT	Fargo Force	Viaero Center
13:33 - Matthew Knies (1)		First period		Cody Monds (1) - 15:23
5:24 - Gavin Brindley (1); 9:03 - pp - Conner Hutchison (1)		Second period		Austin Wong (1) - sh - 8:10
10:37 - Drew Montgomery (1)		Third period		Tristan Broz (1) - pp - 5:11
No scoring		First overtime period		Cody Monds (2) - 2:52
Todd Scott (30 saves / 35 shots)		Goalie stats		Brennan Boynton (29 saves / 33 shots)

May 1	Tri-City Storm	2 – 3	Fargo Force	Viaero Center
Carter Mazur (1) - 1:11; Cole O'Hara (1) - 12:52		First period	6:44 - Tristan Broz (2)
No scoring		Second period	6:05 - pp - Mason Salquist (1); 9:05 - Jeremy Davidson (1)
No scoring		Third period	No scoring
Todd Scott (19 saves / 22 shots)		Goalie stats	Brennan Boynton (36 saves / 38 shots)

Fargo wins series 2 – 1

==== (W2) Omaha Lancers vs. (W3) Sioux City Musketeers ====
May 1	Omaha Lancers	0 – 2	Sioux City Musketeers	Ralston Arena
No scoring		First period	Ben Doran (1) - 12:01
No scoring		Second period	Shai Buium (1) - 3:04
No scoring		Third period	No scoring
Jakub Dobeš (17 saves / 19 shots)		Goalie stats	Akira Schmid (25 saves / 25 shots)

May 2	Omaha Lancers	1 – 2	Sioux City Musketeers	Ralston Arena
No scoring		First period	Chase Bradley (1) - pp - 2:12
12:05 - Cam Mitchell (1)		Second period	No scoring
No scoring		Third period	Justin Hryckowian (1) - sh - 11:50
Jakub Dobeš (31 saves / 33 shots)		Goalie stats	Akira Schmid (29 saves / 30 shots)

Sioux City wins series 2 – 0

== Conference Finals ==
=== Eastern Conference ===
==== (E1) Chicago Steel vs. (E2) Muskegon Lumberjacks ====
May 7	Chicago Steel	3 – 2	OT	Muskegon Lumberjacks	Fox Valley Ice Arena
No scoring		First period		Cameron Berg (3) - 18:54
16:43 - pp - Josh Doan (1)		Second period		Bradley Marek (2) - 19:16
8:06 - Adam Fantilli (2)		Third period		No scoring
7:09 - Matt Coronato (4)		First overtime period		No scoring
Simon Latkoczy (29 saves / 31 shots)		Goalie stats		Jan Škorpík (22 saves / 25 shots)

May 8	Muskegon Lumberjacks	4 – 5	Chicago Steel	Mercy Health Arena
18:08 - Danil Gushchin (2)		First period	Adam Fantilli (3) - 2:37
7:02 - Cameron Berg (4); 7:52 - Danil Gushchin (3); 15:14 - pp - Jacob Guevin (1)		Second period	Erik Middendorf (2) - 1:41; Matt Coronato (5) - 8:24; Matt Coronato (6) - 19:47
No scoring		Third period	Adam Fantilli (4) - 8:34
Jan Škorpík (25 saves / 30 shots)		Goalie stats	Simon Latkoczy (27 saves / 31 shots)

Chicago wins series 2 – 0

=== Western Conference ===
==== (W3) Sioux City Musketeers vs. (W4) Fargo Force ====
May 7	Sioux City Musketeers	1 – 6	Fargo Force	Tyson Events Center
No scoring		First period	Jacob Braccini (1) - 6:44; Cody Monds (3) - 9:37; Aaron Huglen (2) - 13:22
10:56 - Ethan Edwards (1)		Second period	Jacob Braccini (2) - 2:19; Jacob Braccini (3) - 18:03
No scoring		Third period	Bear Hughes (2) - pp - 15:56
Akira Schmid (21 saves / 27 shots)		Goalie stats	Brennan Boynton (13 saves / 13 shots); Andrew Miller (18 saves / 19 shots)

May 8	Fargo Force	3 – 0	Sioux City Musketeers	Scheels Arena
No scoring		First period	No scoring
Tristan Broz (3) - 5:15		Second period	No scoring
Matt Crasa (1) - 2:59; Jeremy Davidson (2) - en - 19:58		Third period	No scoring
Andrew Miller (34 saves / 34 shots)		Goalie stats	Akira Schmid (29 saves / 31 shots)

Fargo wins series 2 – 0

== Clark Cup Finals ==
=== (E1) Chicago Steel vs. (W4) Fargo Force ===
May 14	Chicago Steel	0 – 3	Fargo Force	Fox Valley Ice Arena
No scoring		First period	Kyle Smolen (1) - 7:27; Jake Peart (2) - 15:01
No scoring		Second period	No scoring
No scoring		Third period	Aaron Huglen (3) - 7:32
Simon Latkoczy (23 saves / 26 shots)		Goalie stats	Andrew Miller (20 saves / 20 shots)

May 15	Chicago Steel	4 – 1	Fargo Force	Fox Valley Ice Arena
1:01 - Adam Fantilli (5); 11:53 - Adam Robbins (1)		First period	Austin Wong (2) - pp - 8:32
No scoring		Second period	No scoring
18:49 - sh - en - Matt Coronato (7); 19:27 - en - Erik Middendorf (3)		Third period	No scoring
Simon Latkoczy (29 saves / 30 shots)		Goalie stats	Andrew Miller (30 saves / 32 shots)

May 21	Fargo Force	1 – 7	Chicago Steel	Scheels Arena
12:42 - Cody Monds (4)		First period	Matt Coronato (8) - pp - 12:29; Erik Middendorf (4) - 19:17
No scoring		Second period	Matt Coronato (9) - 4:58; Josh Doan (2) - 10:44
No scoring		Third period	Sean Farrell (2) - 3:21; Adam Fantilli (6) - pp - 17:33; Sam Lipkin (1) - pp - 18:31
Brennan Boynton (13 saves / 17 shots); Andrew Miller (13 saves / 16 shots)		Goalie stats	Simon Latkoczy (22 saves / 23 shots)

May 22	Fargo Force	1 – 3	Chicago Steel	Scheels Arena
Cody Monds (5) - 12:40		First period	Adam Fantilli (7) - 11:08
No scoring		Second period	Jackson Blake (1) - 13:17
No scoring		Third period	Adam Fantilli (8) - 17:55
Andrew Miller (29 saves / 32 shots)		Goalie stats	Simon Latkoczy (27 saves / 28 shots)

Chicago wins series 3 – 1

== Playoff scoring leaders ==
Note: GP = Games played; G = Goals; A = Assists; Pts = Points; PIM = Penalty minutes

Player	Team	GP	G	A	Pts	PIM
Matt Coronato	Chicago Steel	8	9	4	13	4
Tristan Broz	Fargo Force	9	3	8	11	16
Sean Farrell	Chicago Steel	8	2	8	10	2
Mackie Samoskevich	Chicago Steel	8	1	9	10	4
Adam Fantilli	Chicago Steel	8	8	1	9	2
Cody Monds	Fargo Force	7	5	3	8	2
Aaron Huglen	Fargo Force	9	3	5	8	4
Jake Peart	Fargo Force	9	2	5	7	2
Ryan Ufko	Chicago Steel	8	1	6	7	4
Erik Middendorf	Chicago Steel	8	4	1	5	4
Jacob Braccini	Fargo Force	9	3	2	5	2
Josh Doan	Chicago Steel	8	2	3	5	4

== Playoff leading goaltenders ==
Note: GP = Games played; Mins = Minutes played; W = Wins; L = Losses; GA = Goals Allowed; SO = Shutouts; SV% = Save percentage; GAA = Goals against average

Player	Team	GP	Mins	W	L	GA	SO	SV%	GAA
Simon Latkoczy	Chicago Steel	8	486	7	1	14	0	.938	1.73
Andrew Miller	Fargo Force	6	302	2	2	9	2	.941	1.79
Jakub Dobeš	Omaha Lancers	2	114	0	2	4	0	.923	2.10
Akira Schmid	Sioux City Musketeers	4	237	2	2	9	1	.920	2.28
Matt Davis	Green Bay Gamblers	2	118	0	2	5	0	.922	2.53

== Postseason awards ==
=== USHL awards ===
Award	Name	Team
Player of the Year	Sean Farrell	Chicago Steel
Forward of the Year	Matthew Coronato	Chicago Steel
Defenseman of the Year	Mason Lohrei	Green Bay Gamblers
Rookie of the Year	Cole Sillinger	Sioux Falls Stampede
Goaltender of the Year	Akira Schmid	Sioux City Musketeers
Coach of the Year	Mike Hamilton	Muskegon Lumberjacks
Scholar-Athlete	Connor Kurth	Dubuque Fighting Saints
Curt Hammer	Will Dineen	Sioux Falls Stampede
General Manager of the Year	Ryan Hardy	Chicago Steel
Executive of the Year	Jeff Mitchell	Green Bay Gamblers
Organization of the Year	All member organizations	

=== All-USHL First Team ===
Pos	Name	Team
G	Akira Schmid	Sioux City
D	Mason Lohrei	Green Bay
D	Ryan Ufko	Chicago
F	Matt Coronato	Chicago
F	Sean Farrell	Chicago
F	Danil Gushchin	Muskegon

=== All-USHL Second Team ===
Pos	Name	Team
G	Jakub Dobeš	Omaha
D	Brent Johnson	Sioux Falls
D	Cole McWard	Tri-City
F	Josh Doan	Chicago
F	Ayrton Martino	Omaha
F	Cole Sillinger	Sioux Falls

=== All-USHL Third Team ===
Pos	Name	Team
G	Brennan Boynton	Fargo
D	Alex Gagne	Muskegon
D	Henry Thrun	Dubuque
F	Cameron Berg	Muskegon
F	Robert Cronin	Dubuque
F	Jake Schmaltz	Green Bay

=== USHL All-Rookie Team ===
Pos	Name	Team
G	Jack Stark	Chicago
D	Jacob Guevin	Muskegon
D	Brent Johnson	Sioux Falls
F	Ayrton Martino	Omaha
F	Matthew Savoie	Dubuque
F	Cole Sillinger	Sioux Falls

=== All-Rookie Second Team ===
Pos	Name	Team
G	Emmett Croteau	Waterloo
D	Shai Buium	Sioux City
D	Jack Peart	Fargo
F	Gavin Brindley	Tri-City
F	Adam Fantilli	Chicago
F	Connor Kurth	Dubuque
