= Chase Bradley =

American ice hockey player (born 2002)

- Born: January 9, 2002 (age 24) St. Louis, Missouri, U.S.
- Height: 5 ft 11 in (180 cm)
- Weight: 180 lb (82 kg; 12 st 12 lb)
- Position: Forward
- Shoots: Left
- NHL team (P) Cur. team Former teams: Nashville Predators; Milwaukee Admirals (AHL); Colorado Avalanche
- NHL draft: 203rd overall, 2020; Detroit Red Wings
- Playing career: 2024–present

Chase Raymond Bradley (born January 9, 2002) is an American professional ice hockey player who is a forward for the Milwaukee Admirals of the American Hockey League (AHL) while under contract with the Nashville Predators of the National Hockey League (NHL). The Detroit Red Wings selected Bradley in the seventh round, 203rd overall, of the 2020 NHL entry draft.

== Early life ==
Bradley was born January 9, 2002, in St. Louis, Missouri, as one of Mark and Jennifer Bradley's five children. He grew up playing ice hockey with his siblings in a backyard barn that was remodeled into a rink. Bradley began attending Oakville High School in 2016 and spent two years on the school's hockey team, but his size and skills pushed him to more competitive teams. The Omaha Lancers of the United States Hockey League (USHL) signed Bradley to a contract ahead of the 2018–19 USHL season. The Lancers traded Bradley to the Sioux City Musketeers in March 2020, but due to the effects of the COVID-19 pandemic, he did not begin play with his new team until the 2020–21 season. Between 2018 and 2021, Bradley had 32 goals and 63 points in 123 junior ice hockey games.

== Playing career ==
=== College ===
Bradley was one of eight newcomers to join the UConn Huskies men's ice hockey team for the 2021–22 Hockey East men's season. He finished his rookie season strong, with four of his nine points that season coming in his final five games. As a junior for the 2023–24 season, Bradley had 11 goals and 22 points in 32 games. He finished his college career with 25 goals and 51 points in 95 games across three seasons.

=== Professional ===
The Detroit Red Wings of the National Hockey League (NHL) selected Bradley in the seventh round, 203rd overall, of the 2020 NHL entry draft. He did not sign in Detroit, and four years after his draft, he became an unrestricted free agent. His time at UConn caught the attention of the Colorado Avalanche, who signed Bradley to a two-year entry-level contract on July 2, 2024. Bradley began his professional hockey career with the Colorado Eagles, the Avalanche's American Hockey League (AHL) affiliate. After recording three goals and four points in 17 AHL games, Bradley was called up to the Avalanche on November 27, replacing an injured Jonathan Drouin.

On June 24, 2026, Bradley, Jack Drury and a 2029 third-round pick were traded to the Nashville Predators in exchange for Zachary L'Heureux and Fedor Svechkov .

== Career statistics ==
			Regular season					Playoffs
Season	Team	League	GP	G	A	Pts	PIM	GP	G	A	Pts	PIM
2018–19	Omaha Lancers	USHL	37	3	1	4	8	—	—	—	—	—
2019–20	Omaha Lancers	USHL	34	7	12	19	77	—	—	—	—	—
2020–21	Sioux City Musketeers	USHL	52	22	18	40	82	3	1	0	1	25
2021–22	UConn Huskies	HE	29	4	5	9	14	—	—	—	—	—
2022–23	UConn Huskies	HE	35	10	10	20	61	—	—	—	—	—
2023–24	UConn Huskies	HE	31	11	11	22	53	—	—	—	—	—
2024–25	Colorado Eagles	AHL	62	14	8	22	44	9	1	0	1	2
2024–25	Colorado Avalanche	NHL	2	0	0	0	0	—	—	—	—	—
2025–26	Colorado Eagles	AHL	42	9	3	12	46	17	5	5	10	14
NHL totals			2	0	0	0	0	—	—	—	—	—
