= Akira Schmid =

Swiss ice hockey player (born 2000)

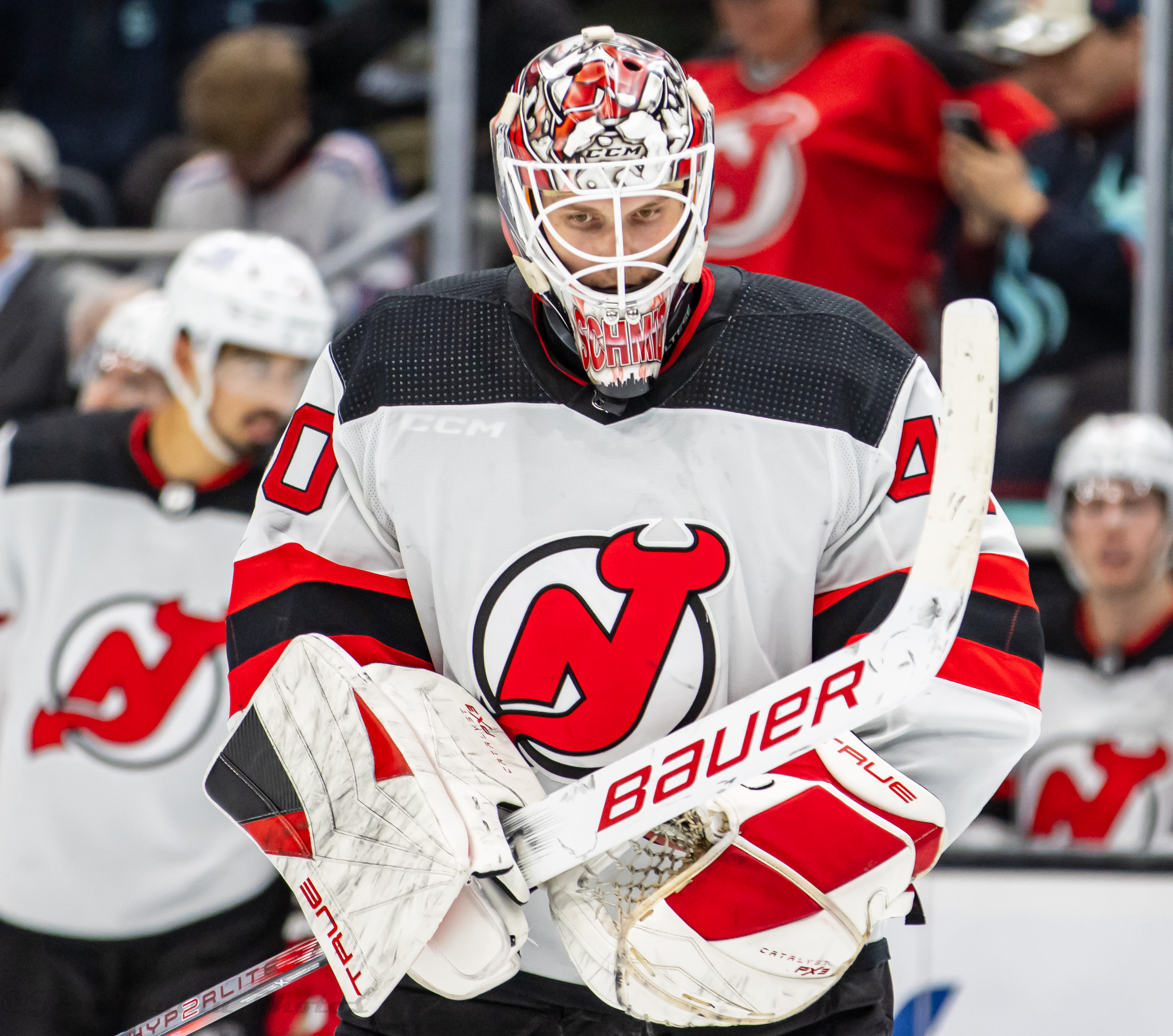
- Schmid with the New Jersey Devils in 2023
- Born: 12 May 2000 (age 26) Bern, Switzerland
- Height: 6 ft 5 in (196 cm)
- Weight: 205 lb (93 kg; 14 st 9 lb)
- Position: Goaltender
- Catches: Left
- NHL team Former teams: Florida Panthers; SCL Tigers; New Jersey Devils; Vegas Golden Knights
- National team: Switzerland
- NHL draft: 136th overall, 2018; New Jersey Devils
- Playing career: 2018–present

Akira Schmid (born 12 May 2000) is a Swiss professional ice hockey player who is a goaltender for the Florida Panthers of the National Hockey League (NHL). He was selected by the New Jersey Devils in the fifth round, 136th overall, in the 2018 NHL entry draft, and has also played in the NHL for the Vegas Golden Knights.

== Playing career ==
Schmid played most of his youth and junior ice hockey in the SCL Tigers system, appearing in just one game at the National League level, a relegation match in 2018. He was selected in the fifth round of the 2018 NHL entry draft at the end of the 2017–18 season, during which he was loaned multiple times from his junior team to professional teams within Switzerland. He moved to North America to start the 2018–19 season, playing three seasons in the United States Hockey League (USHL) for the Omaha Lancers and Sioux City Musketeers.

On 17 May 2021, Schmid signed a three-year, entry-level contract with the New Jersey Devils. Schmid made his National Hockey League (NHL) debut on 11 December 2021, in a 4–2 loss to the New York Islanders. By making his debut with the Devils, Schmid made history in becoming the first goaltender to debut in the NHL directly from the USHL.

During the 2022–23 season, on 10 November 2022, Schmid collected his first career NHL win with the Devils in a 4–3 overtime win against the Ottawa Senators. On 25 February 2023, Schmid recorded his first NHL shutout with the Devils in a 7–0 win against the Philadelphia Flyers. In first round of the 2023 Stanley Cup playoffs, Schmid started game three after starter Vítek Vaněček gave up nine goals in the first two games of the series. He went on to get the win in that game, and shutout the Rangers in games five and seven to secure the series victory for the Devils.

Schmid with the Golden Knights in 2026.

On 29 June 2024, during the 2024 NHL entry draft, Schmid and Alexander Holtz were traded to the Vegas Golden Knights in exchange for Paul Cotter and a third-round pick in 2025. As a restricted free agent, Schmid did not receive a qualifying offer from Vegas, and thus became an unrestricted free agent two days later; however, he ultimately signed a two-year contract with Vegas on 3 July. Since he was the third-string goaltender for Vegas behind Adin Hill and Ilya Samsonov, Schmid was reassigned to the AHL's Henderson Silver Knights on 2 October. Following an injury to Samsonov, Schmid was recalled to the NHL on 2 November; he subsequently made his debut for Vegas on 11 November, entering a game against the Carolina Hurricanes in relief of Hill, and stopping all 12 shots faced. After another recall in March 2025 following a second Samsonov injury, Schmid made his first start for Vegas on 6 April, stopping 21 of 23 shots faced in a 3–2 overtime victory over the Calgary Flames. Schmid later made his playoff debut for Vegas on 24 April, entering in relief of Hill again and stopping all nine shots faced in a 5–2 first-round game 3 loss to the Minnesota Wild.

After entering the 2025–26 season as Hill's full-time backup, Schmid took over as Vegas' starter in late October after Hill suffered a lower-body injury. Schmid subsequently recorded his first shutout with Vegas on 4 November 2025, stopping all 24 shots faced in a 1–0 victory over the Detroit Red Wings.

Akira Schmid in net with the Florida Panthers in November 2026

On 29 June 2026, Schmid was traded by the Golden Knights to the Florida Panthers, in exchange for a 2028 third-round pick. As a restricted free agent, Schmid was later signed to a two-year, $4 million contract extension with the Panthers on 24 July 2026.

== International play ==
Medal record

Men's ice hockey

Representing Switzerland

World Championships
Silver medal – second place	2024 Czech Republic	

Schmid represented Switzerland at the 2024 IIHF World Championship and won a silver medal. In his first start of the event, a preliminary round match against Great Britain, he recorded a 15-save shutout.

== Career statistics ==
=== Regular season and playoffs ===
Bold indicates led league.

			Regular season									Playoffs
Season	Team	League	GP	W	L	OT	MIN	GA	SO	GAA	SV%	GP	W	L	MIN	GA	SO	GAA	SV%
2016–17	SCL Tigers	Elite Jr. A	2	1	1	0	121	8	0	3.97	—	—	—	—	—	—	—	—	—
2017–18	SCL Tigers	Elite Jr. A	32	18	9	3	1,867	81	2	2.60	—	4	2	2	238	12	0	3.02	—
2017–18	EHC Thun	MSL	4	3	1	0	244	9	0	2.21	—	—	—	—	—	—	—	—	—
2018–19	Lethbridge Hurricanes	WHL	1	0	1	0	57	7	0	7.43	.741	—	—	—	—	—	—	—	—
2018–19	Corpus Christi IceRays	NAHL	2	2	0	0	120	3	0	1.50	.948	—	—	—	—	—	—	—	—
2018–19	Omaha Lancers	USHL	37	16	14	2	2,012	73	2	2.18	.926	—	—	—	—	—	—	—	—
2019–20	Omaha Lancers	USHL	6	2	2	1	359	18	0	3.01	.891	—	—	—	—	—	—	—	—
2019–20	Sioux City Musketeers	USHL	7	3	4	0	405	23	1	3.41	.888	—	—	—	—	—	—	—	—
2020–21	Sioux City Musketeers	USHL	36	22	13	1	2,147	72	3	2.01	.921	4	2	2	237	9	1	2.28	.920
2021–22	Utica Comets	AHL	38	22	8	5	2,167	94	2	2.60	.911	1	0	1	62	4	0	3.89	.895
2021–22	New Jersey Devils	NHL	6	0	4	0	236	19	0	4.83	.833	—	—	—	—	—	—	—	—
2022–23	Utica Comets	AHL	23	11	7	4	1,349	59	2	2.62	.905	—	—	—	—	—	—	—	—
2022–23	New Jersey Devils	NHL	18	9	5	2	902	32	1	2.13	.922	9	4	4	460	18	**2**	2.35	.921
2023–24	Utica Comets	AHL	23	9	8	5	1,353	69	1	3.06	.894	—	—	—	—	—	—	—	—
2023–24	New Jersey Devils	NHL	19	5	9	1	915	48	0	3.15	.895	—	—	—	—	—	—	—	—
2024–25	Henderson Silver Knights	AHL	30	9	18	3	1,762	105	0	3.58	.886	—	—	—	—	—	—	—	—
2024–25	Vegas Golden Knights	NHL	5	2	0	1	238	5	0	1.26	.944	1	0	0	19	0	0	0.00	1.000
2025–26	Vegas Golden Knights	NHL	34	16	10	6	1966	85	2	2.59	.893	—	—	—	—	—	—	—	—
NHL totals			82	32	28	10	4,256	189	3	2.66	.898	10	4	4	479	18	2	2.26	.924

=== International ===
Year	Team	Event	Result	GP	W	L	T	MIN	GA	SO	GAA	SV%
2017	Switzerland	U18	8th	3	0	3	0	153	9	0	3.52	.902
2017	Switzerland	IH18	7th	3	1	2	0	153	5	0	1.96	.930
2018	Switzerland	U18	9th	2	0	2	0	120	13	0	6.50	.865
2019	Switzerland	WJC	4th	3	0	2	0	170	12	0	4.23	.878
2024	Switzerland	WC	2nd place, silver medalist(s)	3	3	0	0	139	2	1	0.86	.946
2026	Switzerland	OG	5th	1	0	1	0	60	5	0	5.00	.872
Junior totals				11	1	9	0	596	39	0	3.92	.892
Senior totals				4	3	1	0	199	7	1	2.11	.908

== Awards and honors ==
Award	Year	Ref
USHL
Third All-Star Team	2019	
First All-Star Team	2021	
Goaltender of the Year	2021	
