= Ryan Ufko =

American ice hockey player (born 2003)

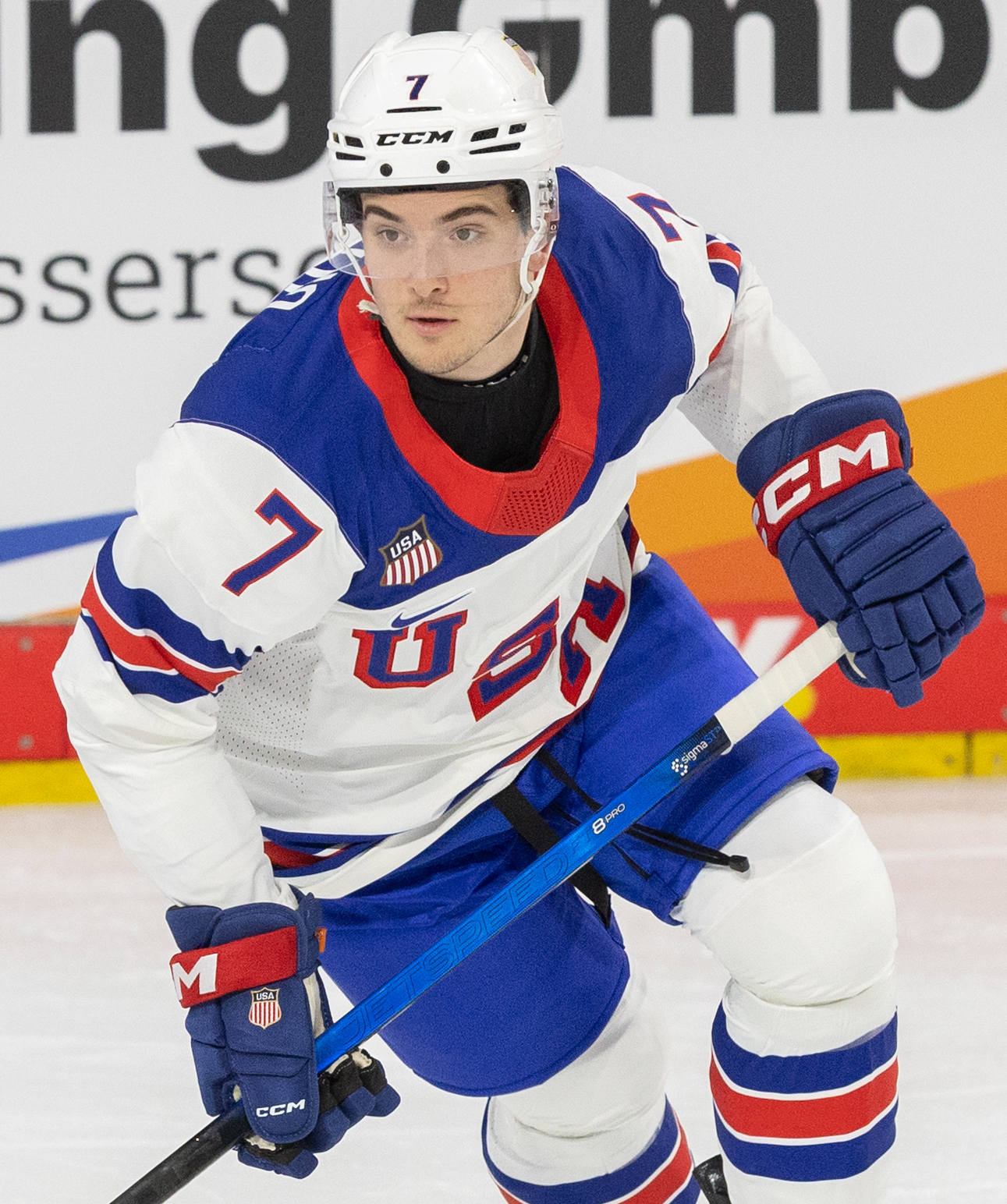
- Ufko in 2026
- Born: May 7, 2003 (age 23) Smithtown, New York, U.S.
- Height: 5 ft 10 in (178 cm)
- Weight: 181 lb (82 kg; 12 st 13 lb)
- Position: Defense
- Shoots: Right
- NHL team (P) Cur. team: Nashville Predators; Milwaukee Admirals (AHL)
- National team: United States
- NHL draft: 115th overall, 2021; Nashville Predators
- Playing career: 2024–present

Ryan Richard Ufko (born May 7, 2003) is an American professional ice hockey player who is a defenseman for the Milwaukee Admirals of the American Hockey League (AHL) as a prospect to the Nashville Predators of the National Hockey League (NHL). He played college ice hockey at UMass. He was drafted 115th overall by the Predators in the 2021 NHL entry draft.

== Early life ==
Ufko was born to Michael and Jennifer Ufko, and has one sibling, Justin. He attended Smithtown High School and graduated from Laurel Springs Online High School.

== Playing career ==
=== Junior ===
Ufko played two seasons for the Chicago Steel. During the 2019–20 season, he recorded two goals and seven assists in 43 games. During the 2020–21 season, he recorded ten goals and 29 assists in 53 games, won the Clark Cup and was named to the All-USHL First Team.

=== College ===
Ufko began his collegiate career for UMass during the 2021–22 season. During his freshman year he recorded five goals and 26 assists in 37 games. His 26 assists tied for the national lead among rookie defensemen in assists, and his 39 points ranked third among rookie defensemen. He led Hockey East in conference play with 19 assists in 24 games. Following the season he was named to the All-Hockey East Rookie Team. During the 2022–23 season, in his sophomore year, he recorded eight goals and 16 assists in 32 games. He ranked third on the team in scoring with 24 points and led the team in blocks with 48. Following the season he was named to the All-Hockey East Second Team.

On September 11, 2023, he was named a co-captain for the Minutemen. During the 2023–24 season, in his junior year, he recorded ten goals and 16 assists in 37 games. He ranked third on the team in scoring with 26 points and led the team in blocks with 55. His six power-play goals and six game winning goals tied a program single-season record. Following the season he won the Len Ceglarski Award and was named to the All-Hockey East First Team and named AHCA East First Team All-American. He was also named a finalist for the Hockey East Player of the Year and a New England Men's Division I All-Star.

He finished his collegiate career at UMass with 23 goals and 58 assists in 106 games.

=== Professional ===
On March 29, 2024, Ufko signed a three-year, entry-level contract with the Nashville Predators.

== International play ==
Medal record

Representing United States

Ice hockey

World Junior Championships
Bronze medal – third place	2023 Canada	

Ufko represented the United States men's national junior ice hockey team at the 2023 World Junior Ice Hockey Championships, where he recorded one goal and nine assists in seven games and won a bronze medal. His ten points tied for the tournament lead with Ludvig Jansson in defenseman scoring, while his nine assists led all defenseman in the tournament. His five assists in the quarterfinals against Germany on January 2, 2023, were tied for the second-most in a game by an American in IIHF World Junior Championship history.

== Career statistics ==
=== Regular season and playoffs ===
			Regular season					Playoffs
Season	Team	League	GP	G	A	Pts	PIM	GP	G	A	Pts	PIM
2019–20	Chicago Steel	USHL	43	2	7	9	21	—	—	—	—	—
2020–21	Chicago Steel	USHL	53	10	29	39	14	—	—	—	—	—
2021–22	UMass-Amherst	HE	37	5	26	31	12	—	—	—	—	—
2022–23	UMass-Amherst	HE	32	8	16	24	25	—	—	—	—	—
2023–24	UMass-Amherst	HE	37	10	16	26	14	—	—	—	—	—
2023–24	Milwaukee Admirals	AHL	9	1	5	6	4	15	1	9	10	6
2024–25	Milwaukee Admirals	AHL	72	8	22	30	14	10	0	3	3	6
2024–25	Nashville Predators	NHL	1	0	0	0	0	—	—	—	—	—
2025–26	Milwaukee Admirals	AHL	52	11	33	44	20	3	1	0	1	4
2025–26	Nashville Predators	NHL	18	2	9	11	6	—	—	—	—	—
NHL totals			19	2	9	11	6	—	—	—	—	—

=== International ===
Year	Team	Event	Result	GP	G	A	Pts	PIM
2023	United States	WJC	3rd place, bronze medalist(s)	7	1	9	10	2
2026	United States	WC	8th	8	1	2	3	0
Junior totals				7	1	9	10	2
Senior totals				8	1	2	3	0

== Awards and honors ==
Award	Year
College
All-Hockey East Rookie Team	2022
All-Hockey East Second Team	2023
All-Hockey East First Team	2024
Len Ceglarski Award	2024
AHCA East First Team All-American	2024
