= Danil Gushchin =

Russian ice hockey player (born 2002)

- Born: 6 February 2002 (age 24) Yekaterinburg, Russia
- Height: 5 ft 8 in (173 cm)
- Weight: 165 lb (75 kg; 11 st 11 lb)
- Position: Right wing
- Shoots: Left
- KHL team Former teams: Avtomobilist Yekaterinburg; San Jose Sharks
- NHL draft: 76th overall, 2020; San Jose Sharks
- Playing career: 2022–present

Danil Vadimovich Gushchin (Russian: Данил Вадимович Гущин; born 6 February 2002) is a Russian professional ice hockey right winger for Avtomobilist Yekaterinburg of the Kontinental Hockey League (KHL). Selected by the San Jose Sharks in the 2020 NHL entry draft, he made his NHL debut with them in 2023.

== Playing career ==
Gushchin played and developed as a youth within his hometown in Moscow, featuring with both HC Dynamo Moscow and HC CSKA Moscow junior programs before opting to move to North America to play with the Muskegon Lumberjacks of the United States Hockey League (USHL).

After his second season with the Lumberjacks, Gushchin was drafted by the San Jose Sharks in the third-round, 76th overall, of the 2020 NHL entry draft. Gushchin signed a three-year, entry-level contract with the Sharks on 21 May 2021. Opting to play major junior hockey, Gushchin joined the Niagara IceDogs of the Ontario Hockey League (OHL) for the 2021–22 season after he was previously selected 4th overall in the 2020 CHL Import Draft.

In his first full professional season in 2022–23 season, Gushchin was initially assigned to AHL affiliate, the San Jose Barracuda, and posted an impressive 22 goals and 45 points through 67 regular season games. He was recalled and made his NHL debut with San Jose on 1 April 2023, in a 7–2 win over the Arizona Coyotes, while scoring a goal.

In the 2024–25 season, Gushchin made the opening night roster for the San Jose Sharks and made 12 appearances adding one assist. Assigned to the Barracuda, Gushchin ranked third in team scoring in registering a career high 28 goals and 51 points through 56 regular season games. He added 1 goal in four playoff games.

On 25 July 2025, as a pending restricted free agent with the Sharks, Gushchin was traded to the Colorado Avalanche in exchange for Oskar Olausson. Agreeing to a one-year, two-way contract with the Avalanche, Gushchin was among the last cuts assigned to begin the season with AHL affiliate, the Colorado Eagles. He began the 2025–26 season on an offensive tear, leading the Eagles in goals through December and earning two recalls to the Avalanche as a healthy scratch. After a lower-body injury sidelined him for a month, Gushchin lost his early-season momentum. A second injury further derailed his campaign, reducing him to a depth role for the Eagles by the end of the year. He finished his lone campaign in Colorado with 18 goals and 32 points through 49 regular season appearances, and went scoreless through 3 post-season games.

Gushchin was not tendered a qualifying offer with the Avalanche, and as a free agent he opted to return to Russia in signing a two-year contract with Avtomobilist Yekaterinburg of the KHL on 8 July 2026.

== Career statistics ==
=== Regular season and playoffs ===
| | | | Regular season | | | | | Playoffs |
| Season | Team | League | GP | G | A | Pts | PIM | GP | G | A | Pts | PIM |
|---|---|---|---|---|---|---|---|---|---|---|---|---|
| 2016–17 | HC Dynamo Moscow | RUS-U16 | 13 | 11 | 16 | 27 | 2 | — | — | — | — | — |
| 2017–18 | HC CSKA Moscow | RUS-U17 | 22 | 21 | 18 | 39 | 4 | — | — | — | — | — |
| 2017–18 | HC CSKA Moscow | RUS-U18 | 2 | 2 | 3 | 5 | 4 | — | — | — | — | — |
| 2018–19 | Muskegon Lumberjacks | USHL | 51 | 16 | 20 | 36 | 30 | 2 | 0 | 0 | 0 | 0 |
| 2019–20 | Muskegon Lumberjacks | USHL | 42 | 22 | 25 | 47 | 42 | — | — | — | — | — |
| 2020–21 | Muskegon Lumberjacks | USHL | 46 | 32 | 32 | 64 | 42 | 4 | 3 | 1 | 4 | 0 |
| 2021–22 | Niagara IceDogs | OHL | 51 | 41 | 30 | 71 | 50 | — | — | — | — | — |
| 2021–22 | San Jose Barracuda | AHL | 3 | 0 | 0 | 0 | 2 | — | — | — | — | — |
| 2022–23 | San Jose Barracuda | AHL | 67 | 22 | 23 | 45 | 24 | — | — | — | — | — |
| 2022–23 | San Jose Sharks | NHL | 2 | 1 | 1 | 2 | 0 | — | — | — | — | — |
| 2023–24 | San Jose Barracuda | AHL | 56 | 20 | 34 | 54 | 24 | — | — | — | — | — |
| 2023–24 | San Jose Sharks | NHL | 4 | 1 | 1 | 2 | 0 | — | — | — | — | — |
| 2024–25 | San Jose Barracuda | AHL | 56 | 28 | 23 | 51 | 34 | 4 | 1 | 0 | 1 | 2 |
| 2024–25 | San Jose Sharks | NHL | 12 | 0 | 1 | 1 | 6 | — | — | — | — | — |
| 2025–26 | Colorado Eagles | AHL | 49 | 18 | 14 | 32 | 26 | 3 | 0 | 0 | 0 | 0 |
| NHL totals | | | 18 | 2 | 3 | 5 | 6 | — | — | — | — | — |

=== International ===
| Year | Team | Event | GP | G | A | Pts | PIM |
|---|---|---|---|---|---|---|---|
| 2018 | Russia | U17 | 5 | 4 | 1 | 5 | 0 |
| 2018 | Russia | HG18 | 5 | 3 | 3 | 6 | 0 |
| 2019 | Russia | U17 | 6 | 4 | 2 | 6 | 6 |
| 2019 | Russia | HG18 | 5 | 1 | 1 | 2 | 2 |
| 2019 | Russia | WJAC | 6 | 3 | 0 | 3 | 4 |
| 2019 | Russia | U18 | 7 | 1 | 1 | 2 | 14 |
| Junior totals | | | 34 | 16 | 8 | 24 | 26 |
