= Matt Coronato =

American ice hockey player (born 2002)

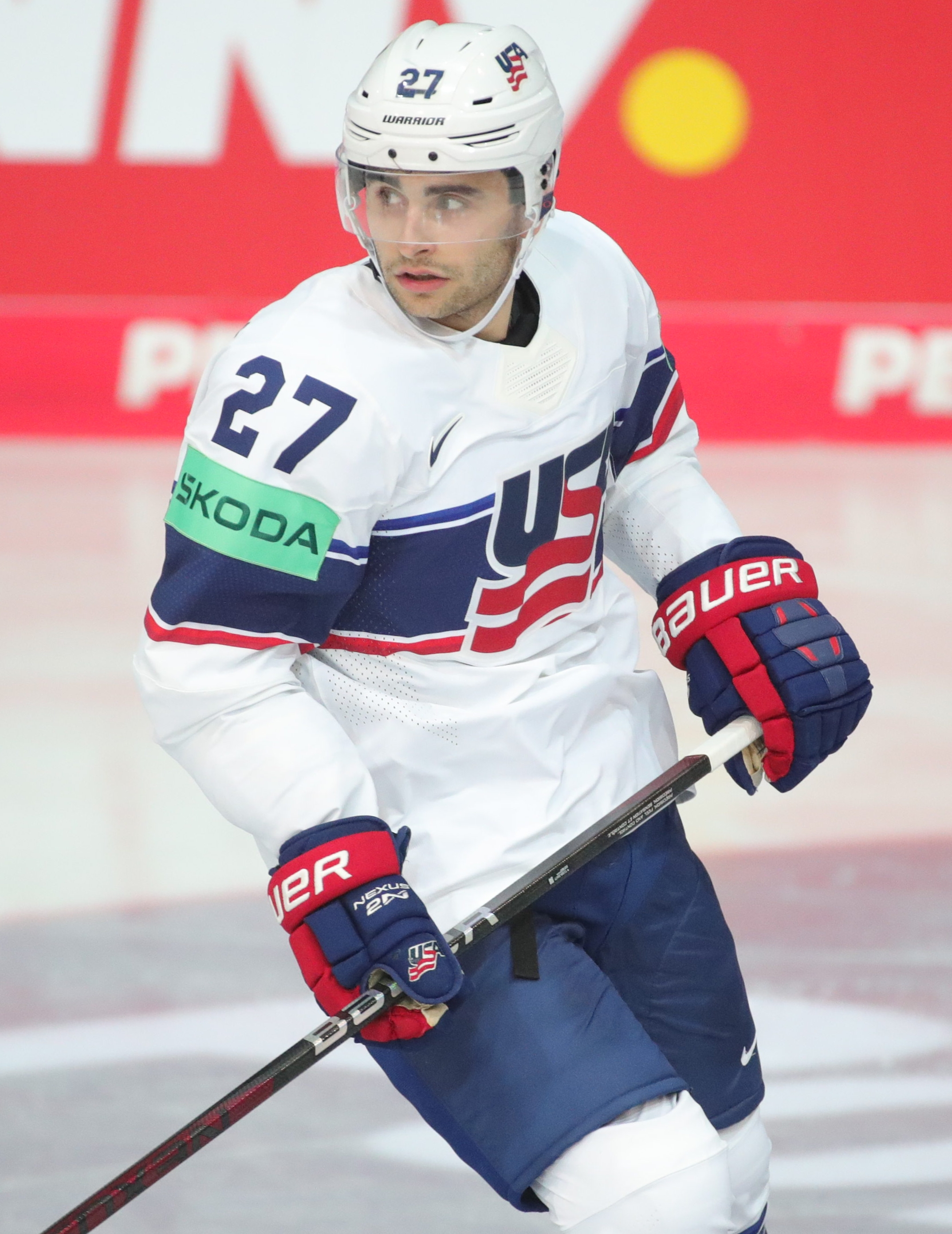
- Coronato with the United States in 2023
- Born: November 14, 2002 (age 23) Huntington, New York, U.S.
- Height: 5 ft 10 in (178 cm)
- Weight: 183 lb (83 kg; 13 st 1 lb)
- Position: Winger
- Shoots: Right
- NHL team: Calgary Flames
- National team: United States
- NHL draft: 13th overall, 2021; Calgary Flames
- Playing career: 2023–present

Matthew Coronato (born November 14, 2002) is an American professional ice hockey player who is a winger for the Calgary Flames of the National Hockey League (NHL). Coronato was drafted by the Flames with the 13th overall pick in the 2021 NHL entry draft.

== Early life ==
Coronato was born on November 14, 2002, in Huntington, New York to parents Samantha and Richard, and grew up in Greenlawn, New York. He was born into an athletic family as his father played college lacrosse at the College of the Holy Cross and his younger brother Jake also played hockey. Coronato became interested in ice hockey after attending a New York Islanders game as a child. Coronato is of Italian descent.

== Playing career ==
=== Amateur ===
Growing up in New York, Coronato played six seasons with the Long Island Royals in the Long Island Amateur Hockey League before entering prep school programs. He joined the New Jersey Colonials U14 program for the 2016–17 season where he ranked second on the team after accumulating 18 goals and 29 assists for 47 points through 21 games. Coronato then played with the Long Island Gulls for the 2017–18 season while also winning a New York Catholic State Championship as a Sophomore for St. Anthony’s High School in 2018. For the 2018–2019 season, he enrolled in the Salisbury School in Connecticut. While attending the Salisbury School, Coronato announced his commitment to play for Harvard University. He was also drafted by the Chicago Steel of the United States Hockey League (USHL) in their 2018 Futures Draft.

=== USHL ===
After playing preparatory school hockey in Connecticut during the 2018–19 season, Coronato joined the Chicago Steel for the 2019–20 season. As a rookie with the Steel, Coronato tallied 18 goals and 22 assists for 40 points through 45 games to land fourth-most among USHL rookies. He also recorded a season-best nine consecutive games point streak between February 14 and March 7. As a result of his play, Coronato received the nickname 'Bison', in reference to the way he would bulldoze through opponents when entering the offensive zone. He finished the season by earning a spot on the USHL's All-Rookie Second Team.

Coronato returned to the Steel for the 2020–21 season where he set multiple USHL and Steel franchise records. He began the season strong and led the league with 17 goals and 40 points through the first 19 games of the season. He also set a new USHL-record after having produced a point in all 19 games which included 13 multi-point games. As the season continued, Coronato recorded the highest single-season goal total ever recorded by a Steel player and later became Chicago's all-time leader in career goals. During Chicago's 2021 Clark Cup championship run, Coronato led all USHL skaters with nine goals and 13 points in eight games. As a result of his impressive season, Coronato was named the USHL's Forward of the Year and was selected for the All-USHL First Team.

Leading up to the 2021 NHL entry draft, the NHL Central Scouting Bureau ranked Coronato as the ninth-best eligible North American skater. On July 23, 2021, the Calgary Flames selected Coronato with the 13th overall pick in the 2021 draft.

During his time with the Steel, Coronato graduated from St. Charles East High School in St. Charles, Illinois.

=== Collegiate ===
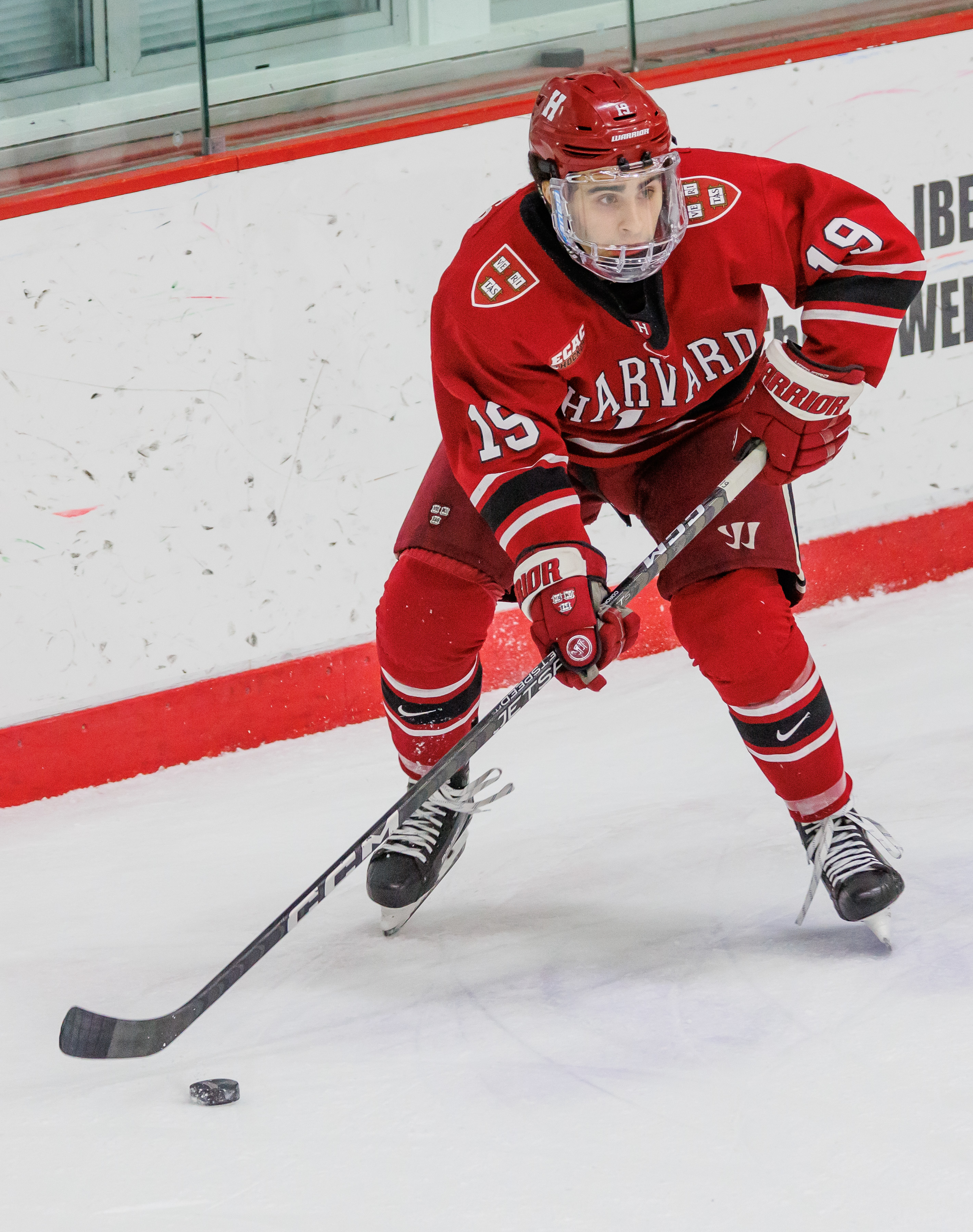
Coronato at Harvard

Following the NHL draft, Coronato played in the All-American Game for 2021 Draft prospects before joining the Harvard Crimson for the 2021–22 season. Upon joining the team, Coronato tallied his first collegiate goal while shorthanded during a 9–3 win over Dartmouth on October 29. In the same game, he also scored another goal and added two assists for a four-point night in the Crimsons' home opener. By early December, Coronato was recognized with an ECAC Hockey Rookie of the Week and was named to the United States' World Junior preliminary roster. As the regular-season concluded, Coronato scored two goals and two assists in a win over Clarkson that sent the Crimson into the ECAC championship game.

=== Professional ===
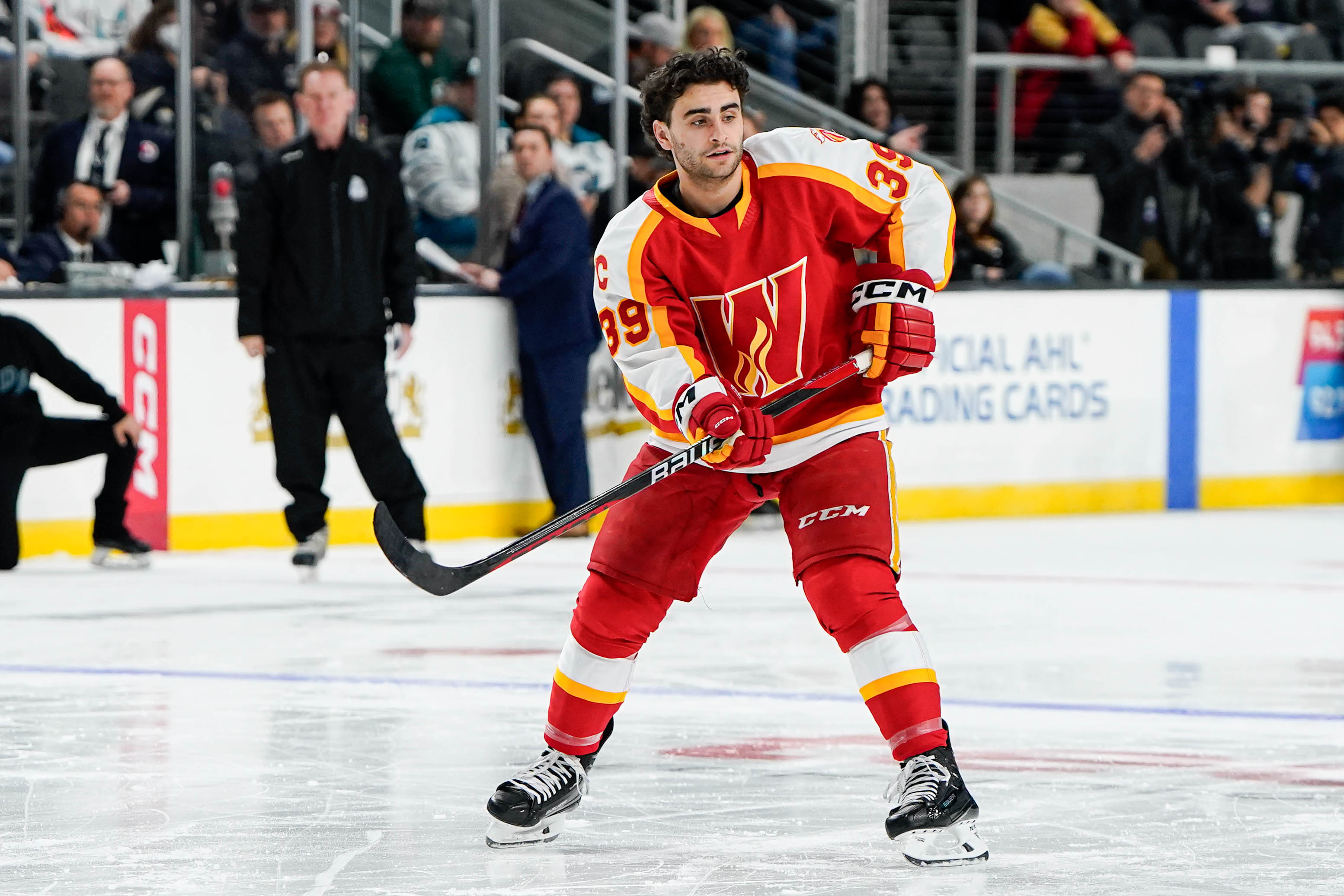
Coronato representing the Calgary Wranglers at the 2024 AHL All-Star Classic.

Following the completion of his sophomore season with Harvard, Coronato concluded his collegiate career by signing a three-year, entry-level contract and immediately joining the Calgary Flames for the remainder of the 2022–23 season on March 26, 2023. Coronato wears number 27 for the Flames.

For the 2023–24 season, Coronato would split his time between the Flames and their AHL affiliate, the Calgary Wranglers. On January 10, 2024, he was named as a representative for the Wranglers to the 2024 AHL All-Star Classic alongside teammate Dustin Wolf.

In 2024–25 season, Coronato's offense blossomed, scoring 24 goals and 47 points in his first full-time NHL season. After the season concluded, Coronato signed a seven-year, $45.5 million contract with the Calgary Flames on May 3, 2025.

== Career statistics ==
=== Regular season and playoffs ===
| | | | Regular season | | | | | Playoffs |
| Season | Team | League | GP | G | A | Pts | PIM | GP | G | A | Pts | PIM |
|---|---|---|---|---|---|---|---|---|---|---|---|---|
| 2019–20 | Chicago Steel | USHL | 45 | 18 | 22 | 40 | 69 | — | — | — | — | — |
| 2020–21 | Chicago Steel | USHL | 51 | 48 | 37 | 85 | 57 | 8 | 9 | 4 | 13 | 4 |
| 2021–22 | Harvard Crimson | ECAC | 34 | 18 | 18 | 36 | 14 | — | — | — | — | — |
| 2022–23 | Harvard Crimson | ECAC | 34 | 20 | 16 | 36 | 14 | — | — | — | — | — |
| 2022–23 | Calgary Flames | NHL | 1 | 0 | 0 | 0 | 2 | — | — | — | — | — |
| 2023–24 | Calgary Flames | NHL | 34 | 3 | 6 | 9 | 4 | — | — | — | — | — |
| 2023–24 | Calgary Wranglers | AHL | 41 | 15 | 27 | 42 | 19 | 6 | 1 | 5 | 6 | 0 |
| 2024–25 | Calgary Flames | NHL | 77 | 24 | 23 | 47 | 25 | — | — | — | — | — |
| 2024–25 | Calgary Wranglers | AHL | 2 | 2 | 0 | 2 | 2 | — | — | — | — | — |
| 2025–26 | Calgary Flames | NHL | 80 | 18 | 27 | 45 | 32 | — | — | — | — | — |
| NHL totals | | | 192 | 45 | 56 | 101 | 63 | — | — | — | — | — |

=== International ===
| Year | Team | Event | Result | GP | G | A | Pts | PIM |
|---|---|---|---|---|---|---|---|---|
| 2022 | United States | WJC | 5th | 5 | 4 | 3 | 7 | 0 |
| 2023 | United States | WC | 4th | 10 | 3 | 5 | 8 | 2 |
| 2026 | United States | WC | 8th | 8 | 1 | 2 | 3 | 2 |
| Junior totals | | | | 5 | 4 | 3 | 7 | 0 |
| Senior totals | | | | 18 | 4 | 7 | 11 | 4 |

== Awards and honors ==
| Award | Year | Ref |
USHL
| All-Rookie Second Team | 2019–20 | |
| All-USHL First Team | 2020–21 | |
| Forward of the Year | 2020–21 | |
| Clark Cup (Chicago Steel) | 2020–21 | |
College
| ECAC All-Rookie Team | 2021–22 | |
| All-ECAC Second Team | 2023 | |
| AHCA East Second Team All-American | 2023 | |

Sporting positions
| Preceded by Connor Zary | Calgary Flames' first-round draft pick 2021 | Succeeded by Samuel Honzek |
Awards and achievements
| Preceded by David Jankowski | ECAC Hockey Tournament MOP; 2022 | Succeeded by Carter Gylander |
