= Sean Farrell (ice hockey) =

American ice hockey player (born 2001)

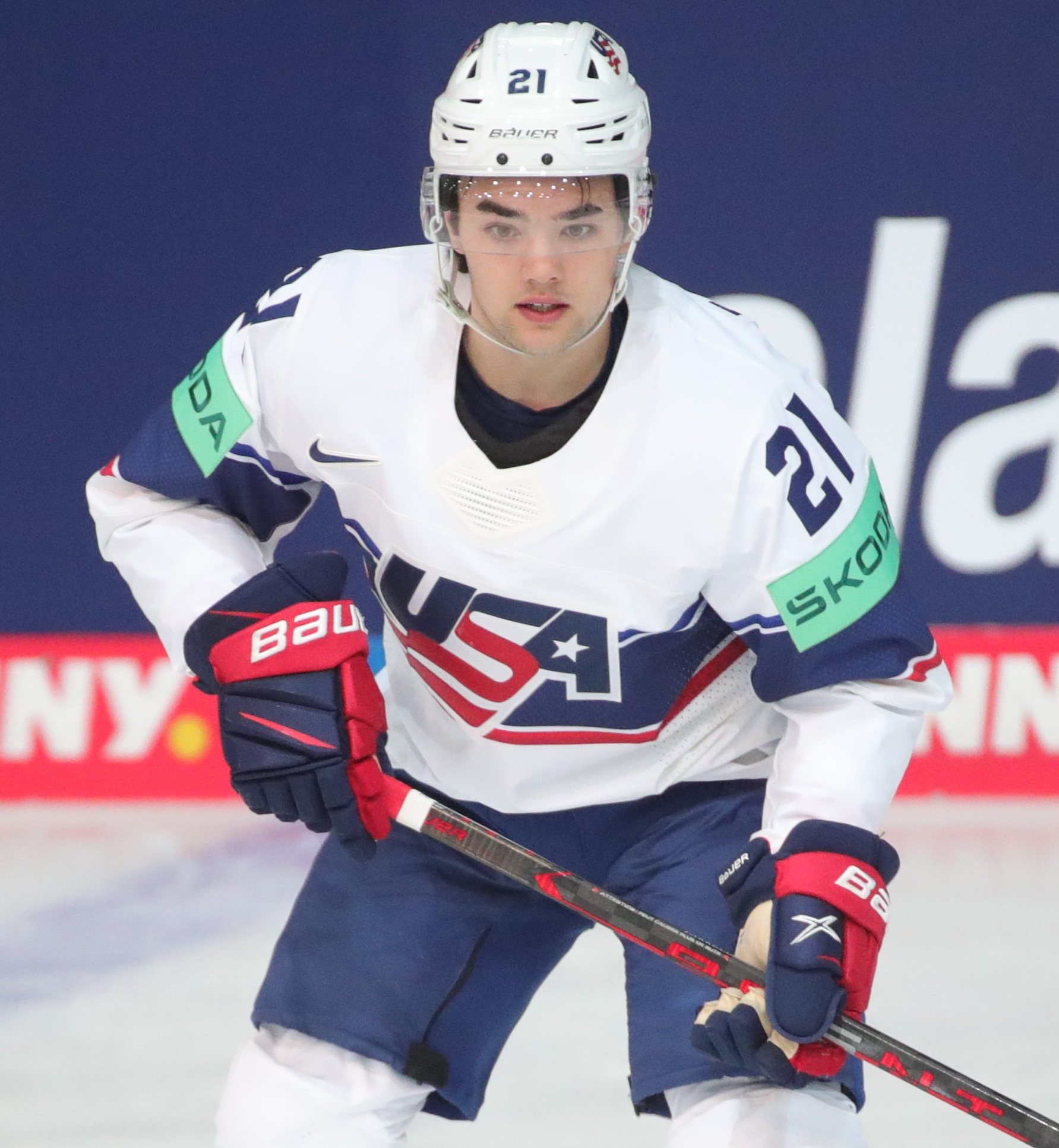
- Farrell with the United States national team in 2023
- Born: November 2, 2001 (age 24) Milton, Massachusetts, U.S.
- Height: 5 ft 9 in (175 cm)
- Weight: 182 lb (83 kg; 13 st 0 lb)
- Position: Left wing
- Shoots: Left
- NHL team (P) Cur. team Former teams: Anaheim Ducks; San Diego Gulls (AHL); Montreal Canadiens
- National team: United States
- NHL draft: 124th overall, 2020; Montreal Canadiens
- Playing career: 2023–present

Sean Farrell (born November 2, 2001) is an American professional ice hockey player who is a winger for the San Diego Gulls of the American Hockey League (AHL) while under contract to the Anaheim Ducks of the National Hockey League (NHL). He was selected in the fourth round, 124th overall, by the Montreal Canadiens in the 2020 NHL entry draft.

== Playing career ==
=== Amateur ===
After two years with the National Team Development Program (USNTDP), Farrell began playing in the United States Hockey League (USHL) with the Chicago Steel. Although originally meant to begin his collegiate career with the Harvard Crimson for the 2020–21 season, the onset of the COVID-19 pandemic resulted in all Ivy League teams opting not to participate in the athletic season. Instead, it was decided that he would return for an additional season in the USHL. The pandemic also prevented in-person attendance at the annual NHL entry draft,, with Farrell and his father watching his draft announcement in a pub at the Steel's Fox Valley Ice Arena. He later called it "a bright spot in a pretty weird year for everyone."

During the 2020–21 season, Farrell recorded 29 goals and 72 assists in 53 games for the Steel, becoming the second player in USHL history to surpass 100 points in a season, after Kevin Roy in 2012. Following an outstanding campaign, he was awarded both the USHL Player of the Year and Dave Tyler Junior Player of the Year Award.

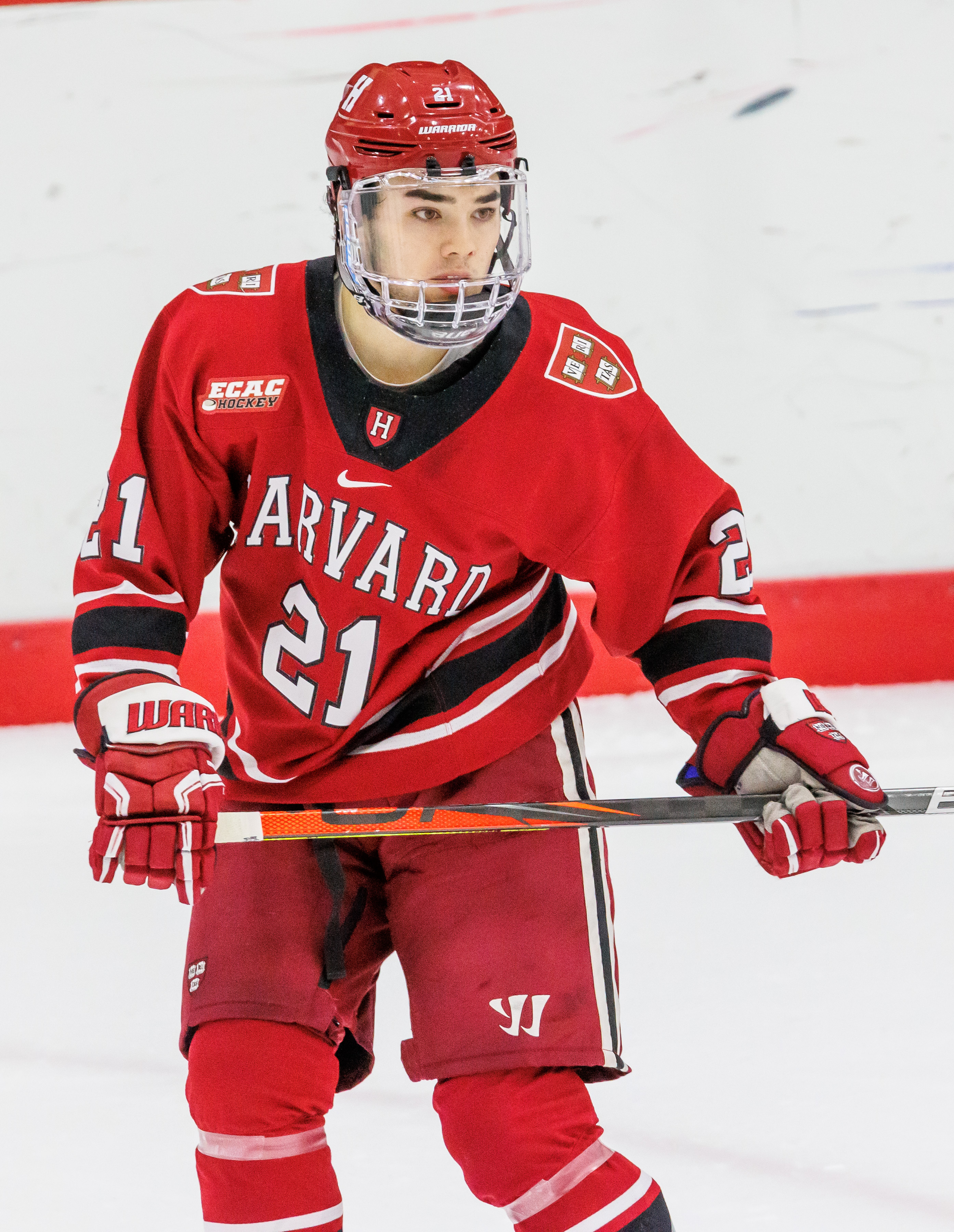
Farrell at Harvard

=== Collegiate ===
Farrell belatedly began his National Collegiate Athletic Association (NCAA) career for the Crimson during the 2021–22 NCAA season where he led his team in points per game production (1.17). Following his junior year in 2022–23, he was named to the All-ECAC Hockey First Team as well as the ECAC Hockey Player of the Year.

=== Professional ===
Selected in the fifth round (124th overall) by the Montreal Canadiens of the National Hockey League (NHL) in the 2020 NHL entry draft, Farrell signed a three-year, entry-level contract with the team on March 26, 2023. He made his NHL debut two days later in a game against the Philadelphia Flyers whereas his first goal came on his first shot in the league in a 5–2 loss to the Florida Panthers on March 30. After attending the ensuing training camp with the Canadiens that September, Farrell would be assigned to Montreal's American Hockey League (AHL) affiliate, the Laval Rocket, to start the 2023–24 season. On February 7, 2025, he registered his first professional hat-trick in a game versus the Toronto Marlies.

Entering the offseason as a restricted free agent, Farrell was extended a qualifying offer by the Canadiens on June 30, 2025. Two days later, he would agree to a one-year extension with the organization.

Despite being tendered an additional qualifying offer from the Canadiens following the conclusion of the 2025–26 season, Farrell was ultimately traded to the Anaheim Ducks in exchange for winger Sasha Pastujov on July 27, 2026. The following day, he was signed to a one-year, two-way contract with the Ducks for the 2026–27 season. After being placed on waivers by the Ducks on September 25, 2026, Farrell was assigned to the team's AHL affiliate, the San Diego Gulls.

== International play ==
Medal record

Representing United States

Ice hockey

World Junior A Challenge
Bronze medal – third place	2019 Canada	

World U18 Championship
Bronze medal – third place	2019 Sweden	

World U-17 Hockey Challenge
Gold medal – first place	2017 Canada	

Internationally, Farrell first represented Team USA at the 2017 World U-17 Hockey Challenge, winning a gold medal. He likewise helped the United States capture gold at the 2017 Four Nations Cup in Russia, appearing in three games with one assist.

In April 2019, Farrell participated in the IIHF World U18 Championships where he recorded two assists in seven games and earned a bronze medal. He also tallied eight points (5G, 3A) in six games as part of that year's World Junior A Challenge en route to a third place podium finish for his country.

On January 13, 2022, Farrell was named to the United States men's national team for the 2022 Winter Olympics. In his Olympic debut, he scored a hat-trick to help lead Team USA to an 8–0 victory over the host nation China.

In May 2022, Farrell competed at the 2022 IIHF World Championship recording two goals and four assists in ten games. Appearing again the following year, he registered a goal and an assist across tournament play.

== Personal life ==
Farrell began his studies at Harvard University online during his final USHL campaign while the collegiate athletics season had been canceled. He graduated with a degree in economics in 2023, having completed the typical four-year curriculum in three years by taking summer courses.

== Career statistics ==
=== Regular season and playoffs ===
			Regular season					Playoffs
Season	Team	League	GP	G	A	Pts	PIM	GP	G	A	Pts	PIM
2017–18	U.S. National Development Team	USHL	34	5	15	20	2	—	—	—	—	—
2018–19	U.S. National Development Team	USHL	28	8	11	19	0	—	—	—	—	—
2019–20	Chicago Steel	USHL	44	15	41	56	28	—	—	—	—	—
2020–21	Chicago Steel	USHL	53	29	72	101	54	8	2	8	10	2
2021–22	Harvard University	ECAC	24	10	18	28	11	—	—	—	—	—
2022–23	Harvard University	ECAC	34	20	33	53	12	—	—	—	—	—
2022–23	Montreal Canadiens	NHL	6	1	0	1	0	—	—	—	—	—
2023–24	Laval Rocket	AHL	47	9	19	28	10	—	—	—	—	—
2024–25	Laval Rocket	AHL	67	20	24	44	10	13	3	7	10	6
2025–26	Laval Rocket	AHL	72	17	36	53	20	5	0	2	2	4
NHL totals			6	1	0	1	0	—	—	—	—	—

=== International ===
Year	Team	Event	Result	GP	G	A	Pts	PIM
2017	United States	U17	1st place, gold medalist(s)	6	2	1	3	0
2019	United States	U18	3rd place, bronze medalist(s)	7	0	2	2	0
2019	United States	WJAC	3rd place, bronze medalist(s)	6	5	3	8	4
2022	United States	OG	5th	4	3	3	6	0
2022	United States	WC	4th	10	2	4	6	4
2023	United States	WC	4th	10	1	1	2	2
Junior totals				19	7	6	13	4
Senior totals				24	6	8	14	6

== Awards and honors ==
Award	Year	Ref
USHL
USA Hockey All-American Game	2020	
Clark Cup champion	2021	
All-USHL First Team	2021	
USHL Player of the Year	2021	
Dave Tyler Junior Player of the Year Award	2021	
College
All-Ivy League Honorable Mention Team	2022	
All-ECAC First Team	2023	
ECAC Hockey Player of the Year	2023	
All-Ivy League First Team	2023	
Ivy League Player of the Year	2023	
AHCA East First Team All-American	2023	
All-USCHO Third Team	2023	
New England Best Forward	2023	
New England D1 All-Stars	2023	

Awards and achievements
Preceded by Yaniv Perets	ECAC Hockey Player of the Year; 2022–23	Succeeded by Collin Graf
