= Tristan Broz =

American ice hockey player (born 2002)

- Born: October 10, 2002 (age 23) River Falls, Wisconsin, United States
- Height: 6 ft 0 in (183 cm)
- Weight: 204 lb (93 kg; 14 st 8 lb)
- Position: Center
- Shoots: Left
- NHL team (P) Cur. team: Pittsburgh Penguins; WBS Penguins (AHL)
- NHL draft: 58th overall, 2021; Pittsburgh Penguins
- Playing career: 2024–present

Tristan Broz (born October 10, 2002) is an American professional ice hockey center for the Wilkes-Barre/Scranton Penguins in the American Hockey League (AHL) as a prospect under contract to the Pittsburgh Penguins of the National Hockey League (NHL).

== Early life ==
Broz was born October 10, 2002, in River Falls, Wisconsin, to Elizabeth and Paul Broz. He was raised in Bloomington, Minnesota, and grew up playing ice hockey with his younger sister Samantha. After a year at Shattuck-Saint Mary's School, Broz attended The Blake School, where he recorded 105 points in 50 games.

== Playing career ==
Broz played junior hockey for the Fargo Force of the United States Hockey League (USHL) from 2018 to 2021.

Broz was selected by the Pittsburgh Penguins in the second round, 58th overall, of the 2021 NHL entry draft.

Broz played college hockey for Minnesota from 2021 to 2022, and for Denver from 2022 to 2024.

On April 20, 2024, Broz signed a three-year contract with Pittsburgh.

Broz made his NHL debut on November 26, 2025, in Pittsburgh's game against the Buffalo Sabres.

== Personal life ==
Broz's younger sister Samantha plays college ice hockey for the Brown Bears. Despite being raised in Minnesota, Broz was a childhood fan of the Pittsburgh Penguins.

== Career statistics ==
| | | | Regular season | | | | | Playoffs |
| Season | Team | League | GP | G | A | Pts | PIM | GP | G | A | Pts | PIM |
|---|---|---|---|---|---|---|---|---|---|---|---|---|
| 2018–19 | Fargo Force | USHL | 6 | 1 | 3 | 4 | 0 | 2 | 0 | 0 | 0 | 0 |
| 2019–20 | Fargo Force | USHL | 48 | 14 | 21 | 35 | 16 | — | — | — | — | — |
| 2020–21 | Fargo Force | USHL | 54 | 19 | 32 | 51 | 54 | 9 | 3 | 8 | 11 | 16 |
| 2021–22 | Minnesota Golden Gophers | B1G | 36 | 6 | 5 | 11 | 10 | — | — | — | — | — |
| 2022–23 | Denver Pioneers | NCHC | 40 | 10 | 18 | 28 | 35 | — | — | — | — | — |
| 2023–24 | Denver Pioneers | NCHC | 43 | 16 | 24 | 40 | 13 | — | — | — | — | — |
| 2023–24 | Wilkes-Barre/Scranton Penguins | AHL | — | — | — | — | — | 2 | 0 | 0 | 0 | 0 |
| 2024–25 | Wilkes-Barre/Scranton Penguins | AHL | 59 | 19 | 18 | 37 | 38 | 2 | 1 | 2 | 3 | 2 |
| 2025–26 | Wilkes-Barre/Scranton Penguins | AHL | 47 | 16 | 23 | 39 | 41 | 15 | 3 | 8 | 11 | 27 |
| 2025–26 | Pittsburgh Penguins | NHL | 1 | 0 | 0 | 0 | 0 | — | — | — | — | — |
| NHL totals | | | 1 | 0 | 0 | 0 | 0 | — | — | — | — | — |
