= Trevor Kuntar =

American ice hockey player (born 2001)

- Born: June 20, 2001 (age 24) Buffalo, New York, U.S.
- Height: 6 ft 0 in (183 cm)
- Weight: 205 lb (93 kg; 14 st 9 lb)
- Position: Center
- Shoots: Left
- NHL team (P) Cur. team: Buffalo Sabres; Rochester Americans (AHL)
- NHL draft: 89th overall, 2020; Boston Bruins
- Playing career: 2023–present

Trevor Kuntar (born June 20, 2001) is an American professional ice hockey center for the Rochester Americans of the American Hockey League (AHL) while under contract to the Buffalo Sabres of the National Hockey League (NHL). The Boston Bruins selected him in the third round of the 2020 NHL entry draft.

== Playing career ==
On December 11, 2025, he made his NHL debut in a 3–2 win at the Vancouver Canucks.

== Personal life ==
He is the son of NHL goaltender Les Kuntar.

== Career statistics ==
			Regular season					Playoffs
Season	Team	League	GP	G	A	Pts	PIM	GP	G	A	Pts	PIM
2017–18	Youngstown Phantoms	USHL	43	2	2	4	44	3	0	0	0	2
2018–19	Youngstown Phantoms	USHL	61	19	17	36	92	2	0	0	0	4
2019–20	Youngstown Phantoms	USHL	44	28	25	53	83	—	—	—	—	—
2020–21	Boston College	HE	23	6	4	10	33	—	—	—	—	—
2021–22	Boston College	HE	36	9	11	20	33	—	—	—	—	—
2022–23	Boston College	HE	34	13	16	29	36	—	—	—	—	—
2023–24	Providence Bruins	AHL	70	10	10	20	113	4	0	1	1	0
2024–25	Providence Bruins	AHL	54	3	9	12	76	3	0	1	1	4
2025–26	Rochester Americans	AHL	70	21	16	37	85	1	0	0	0	2
2025–26	Buffalo Sabres	NHL	1	0	0	0	0	—	—	—	—	—
NHL totals			1	0	0	0	0	—	—	—	—	—
