= Cole McWard =

American ice hockey player (born 2001)

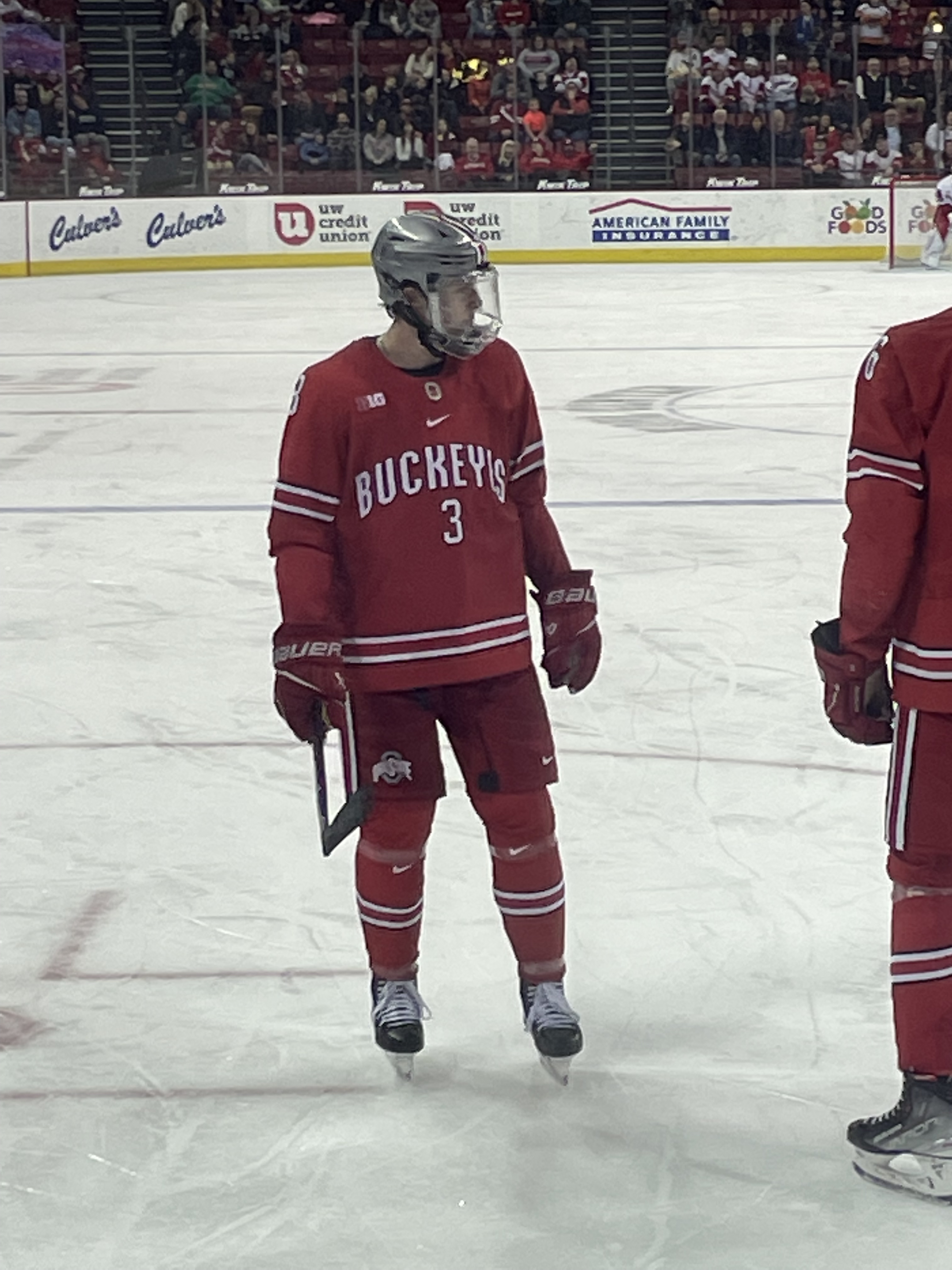
- McWard with Ohio State in 2023
- Born: June 9, 2001 (age 25) Fenton, Missouri, U.S.
- Height: 6 ft 1 in (185 cm)
- Weight: 192 lb (87 kg; 13 st 10 lb)
- Position: Defense
- Shoots: Right
- NHL team Former teams: Toronto Maple Leafs; Vancouver Canucks; New York Islanders
- NHL draft: Undrafted
- Playing career: 2023–present

Cole McWard (born June 9, 2001) is an American professional ice hockey defenseman who is currently playing for the Toronto Maple Leafs of the National Hockey League (NHL). He previously played in the NHL for the Vancouver Canucks and New York Islanders. McWard also played collegiate ice hockey at Ohio State University.

== Personal life ==
McWard was born on June 9, 2001, in Fenton, Missouri, to parents Tina and Patrick. He began skating at the age of three after watching his older brother Gannon start playing ice hockey. He first played organized ice hockey with the Meramec Sharks before playing on multiple single-A and double-AA hockey teams growing up.

== Playing career ==
=== Amateur ===
While playing with the St. Louis AAA Blues during the 2016–17 season, McWard was drafted 80th overall by the Tri-City Storm in the 2017 United States Hockey League Phase I draft. Although he remained with the Blues through 2018, he also played with the Westminster Wildcats at the Westminster Christian Academy and helped them to back-to-back state championships. As a result of his outstanding play, McWard was a member of Team USA that won the 2017 Under-17 Five Nations Tournament in Ostrava, Czech Republic.

McWard eventually made his USHL debut on December 28, 2017, as an affiliate list call-up but remained with the Wildcats and Blues for the remainder of the season. He finished the 2017–18 season with 14 goals and 16 assists for 30 points with the Wildcats. McWard joined the Tri-City Storm full-time during the 2018–19 season and scored his first career USHL goal on November 9, 2018. McWard finished his rookie season with the Storm accumulating one goal and five assists for six points through 48 games and was named to the USHL All-Academic Team. McWard returned to the Storm for the 2019–20 season, which was eventually shortened due to the COVID-19 pandemic. Prior to the league stopping play, McWard brokout with eight goals and 10 assists for 18 points through 48 games.

During the 2020–21 season, McWard committed to Ohio State University starting in 2021–22. At the time, he led all Storm defensemen with one goal and four assists over seven games. Following the commitment, McWard and Carter Mazur were named co-captains alongside alternate captains Matthew Knies, Nick Portz, Kyle Aucoin, and goaltender Todd Scott. On February 10, 2021, McWard was named the USHL's Defenseman of the Week after he led all Storm players with four goals over two games against the Sioux Falls Stampede. He finished the season with a career-high 14 goals and 19 assists for 33 points to rank fourth in scoring among all USHL defensemen. As a result, he was selected for the All-USHL Team Second Team.

=== Collegiate ===
McWard played for the Ohio State Buckeyes from 2021 to 2023. There, he enrolled in the Fisher College of Business where he majored in business. McWard scored his first collegiate point, an assist, on October 15, 2021, during a game against the UConn Huskies. He later scored his first collegiate goal on January 1, 2022, against the LIU Sharks. McWard finished his freshman season at Ohio State with four goals and 12 assists for 16 points through 36 games. He was also recognized as an Ohio State Scholar-Athlete. Before his sophomore season, McWard attended the New Jersey Devils development camp as a free agent invitee but he returned to the Buckeyes for the 2022–23 NCAA season. In his sophomore season, McWard continued to build off his successful freshman season. By early December 2022, he had accumulated two goals and three assists and was recognized as the Big Ten Third Star of the Week.

=== Professional ===
==== Vancouver Canucks ====
On April 4, 2023, after his sophomore season at Ohio State concluded, McWard signed a two-year, entry-level contract with the Vancouver Canucks. Two days following the signing, McWard made his NHL debut with the Canucks against the Chicago Blackhawks. He scored his first career NHL goal in his second career game against the Calgary Flames on April 9.

McWard started the 2023–24 season with the Canucks' American Hockey League (AHL) affiliate, the Abbotsford Canucks. He was called up to Vancouver on November 24, 2023, playing one game before being sent back down.

On June 20, 2024, the Canucks announced that they had re-signed McWard to a one-year, two-way contract.

McWard once again started the season with Abbotsford to start the 2024–25 season. He was recalled to the NHL squad on December 5, 2024, but did not appear in a game with them before being sent down. Although McWard would not get the chance to play at the NHL level during the season, he did show his offensive potential in the AHL, recording six goals and 20 assists in 67 games. McWard would also score a goal and an assist in 12 games in the Calder Cup playoffs as the Canucks would go on to win the Calder Cup.

At season's end, the Canucks announced that they would not be given a qualifying offer to McWard, making him a free agent on July 1, 2025.

==== New York Islanders ====
On July 1, 2025, McWard signed a one-year, two-way contract with the New York Islanders.

On January 3, 2026, after scoring five goals and 11 assists with the Bridgeport Islanders, New York's AHL affiliate, McWard was called up to the NHL, and made his Islanders debut that same day. McWard would play three games with New York, going scoreless, before getting sent back down to Bridgeport on January 24. On January 15, McWard was announced as Bridgeport's representation to the 2026 AHL All-Star Classic as part of the Atlantic Division Team. McWard would finish his first season with the Islanders organization scoring six goals and 21 assists in 63 games with Bridgeport, and going scoreless in two playoff games.

==== Toronto Maple Leafs ====
On July 2, 2026, McWard signed as a free agent to a two-year, two-way contract with the Toronto Maple Leafs.

== Career statistics ==
			Regular season					Playoffs
Season	Team	League	GP	G	A	Pts	PIM	GP	G	A	Pts	PIM
2017–18	Tri-City Storm	USHL	1	0	0	0	0	—	—	—	—	—
2018–19	Tri-City Storm	USHL	48	1	5	6	31	6	0	1	1	2
2019–20	Tri-City Storm	USHL	48	8	10	18	16	—	—	—	—	—
2020–21	Tri-City Storm	USHL	52	14	19	33	54	3	1	1	2	2
2021–22	Ohio State University	B1G	36	4	12	16	2	—	—	—	—	—
2022–23	Ohio State University	B1G	39	9	12	21	8	—	—	—	—	—
2022–23	Vancouver Canucks	NHL	5	1	0	1	0	—	—	—	—	—
2023–24	Abbotsford Canucks	AHL	57	4	13	17	16	6	0	1	1	2
2023–24	Vancouver Canucks	NHL	1	0	0	0	0	—	—	—	—	—
2024–25	Abbotsford Canucks	AHL	67	6	20	26	16	12	1	1	2	2
2025–26	Bridgeport Islanders	AHL	63	6	21	27	24	2	0	0	0	0
2025–26	New York Islanders	NHL	3	0	0	0	0	—	—	—	—	—
NHL totals			9	1	0	1	0	—	—	—	—	—

== Awards and honors ==
Award	Year	Ref
USHL
All-USHL Second Team	2021	
AHL
Calder Cup champion	2025	
All-Star Classic	2026	
