= Erik Portillo =

Swedish ice hockey player (born 2000)

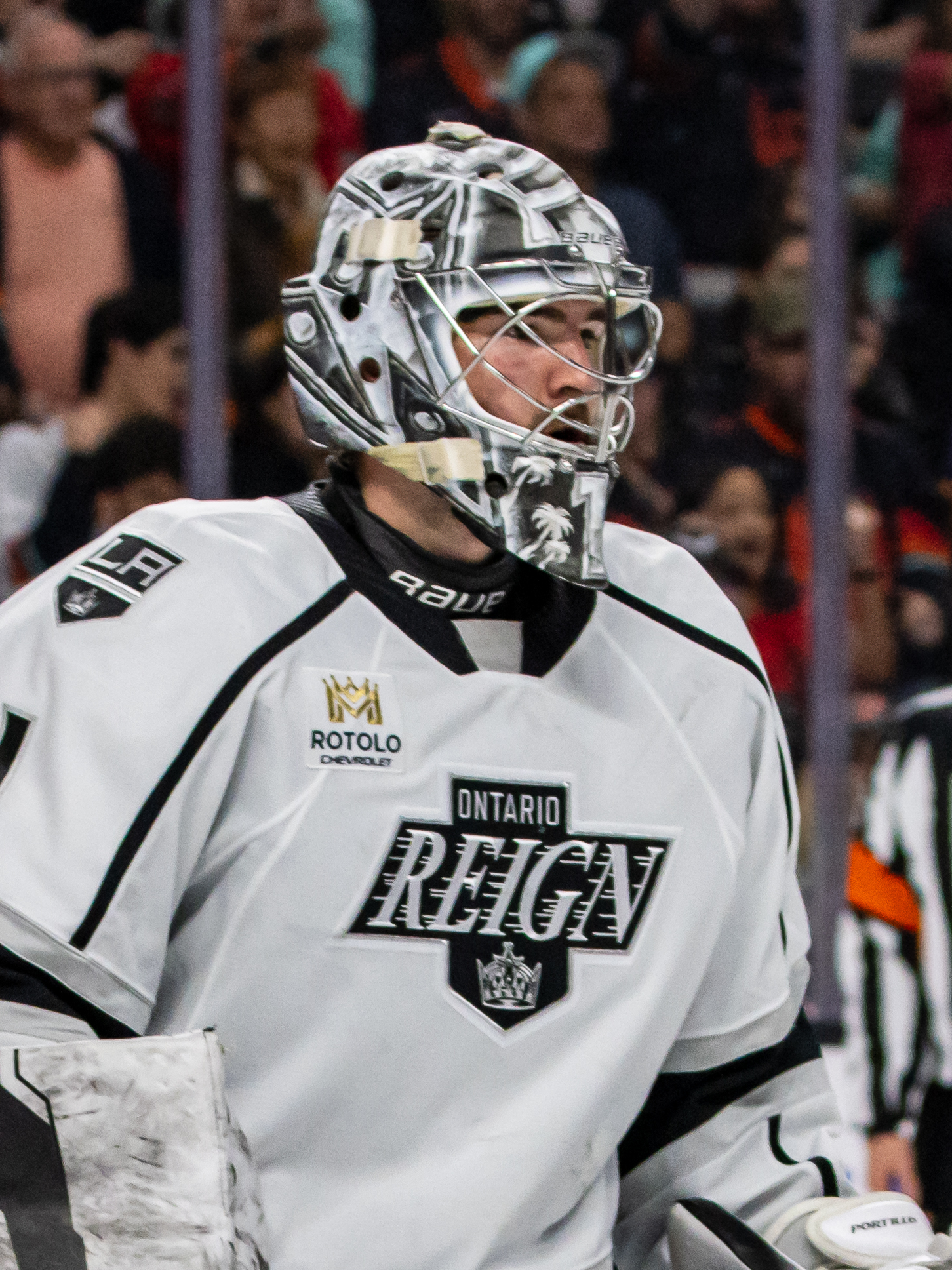
- Portillo with the Ontario Reign in May 2024
- Born: 3 September 2000 (age 26) Gothenburg, Sweden
- Height: 6 ft 6 in (198 cm)
- Weight: 220 lb (100 kg; 15 st 10 lb)
- Position: Goaltender
- Catches: Left
- NHL team (P) Cur. team: Los Angeles Kings; Ontario Reign (AHL)
- NHL draft: 67th overall, 2019; Buffalo Sabres
- Playing career: 2023–present

Erik Portillo (born 3 September 2000) is a Swedish professional ice hockey player who is a goaltender for the Ontario Reign in the American Hockey League (AHL) while under contract to the Los Angeles Kings of the National Hockey League (NHL). Portillo was drafted in the third round, 67th overall, by the Buffalo Sabres in the 2019 NHL entry draft.

== Playing career ==
=== Junior ===
Portillo played for the Dubuque Fighting Saints of the United States Hockey League (USHL) during the 2019–20 season. He appeared in 27 games and posted a 19–5–1 record, leading the USHL with a 2.11 goals against average (GAA), and a .915 save percentage. Following the season he was named first team All-USHL and named the USHL Goaltender of the Year.

=== College ===
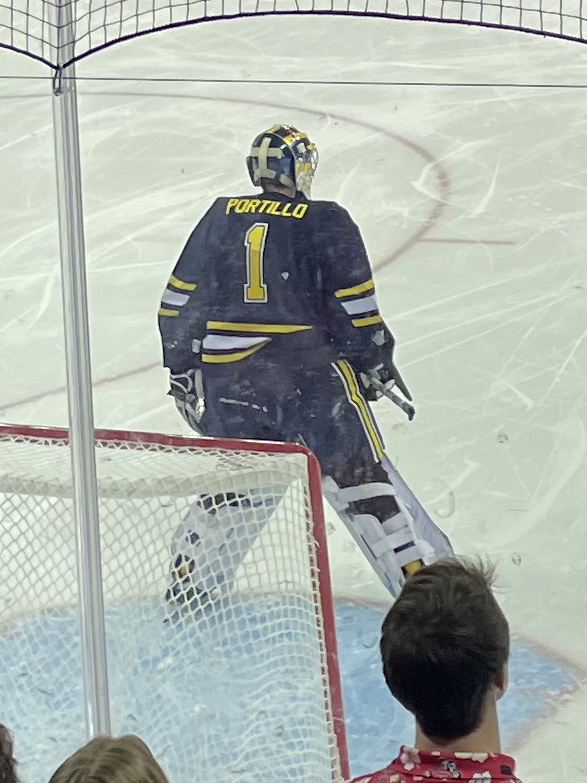
Portillo with the Michigan Wolverines in 2022

Portillo began his collegiate career for the University of Michigan during the 2020–21 season. During his freshman season, he appeared in seven games and posted a 4–1–0 record with a 1.67 GAA and .935 save percentage. He made his collegiate debut for Michigan on 3 December 2020, in relief of Strauss Mann, stopping 15 of 17 shots in a 9–5 loss against Penn State. He made his first career start on 15 January 2021, making 19 saves in a 4–2 victory against Ohio State.

During the 2021–22 season, his sophomore season, Portillo posted a 31–10–1 record with a 2.14 GAA and a .926 save percentage in his first full season as a starter. He led the nation in saves (1,111) and ranked second in wins (31) and minutes played (2,499), fourth in win percentage (.750) and ninth in save percentage (.926). He posted his first career shutout on 28 October 2021, in a 3–0 victory against Wisconsin, stopping all 28 shots he faced. During the 2022 Big Ten tournament, he posted a 4–0 record with a .928 save percentage, and also recorded 90 saves on 95 shots he faced during the tournament. He was subsequently named to the Big Ten All-Tournament Team and named tournament's Most Outstanding Player. Following the season he was named second-team All-Big Ten, a semifinalist for the Mike Richter Award and a finalist for the Big Ten Goaltender of the Year.

On 9 April 2022, Portillo announced he would return to Michigan for his junior year for the 2022–23 season. During his junior season, he posted a 25–11–2 record with a 3.00 GAA and a .908 save percentage and helped lead the Wolverines to their second consecutive Big Ten tournament championship and Frozen Four appearance. He finished his collegiate career with a 60–22–3 overall record, 2.49 GAA, and a .918 save percentage.

=== Professional ===
Portillo was drafted in the third round, 67th overall, by the Buffalo Sabres in the 2019 NHL entry draft. He announced he would not sign with the Sabres and would pursue unrestricted free agency after his college career at Michigan. On 1 March 2023, the Sabres traded his draft rights to the Los Angeles Kings in exchange for a 2023 third-round pick.

On 10 April 2023, Portillo signed an amateur tryout contract (ATO) with the Kings' AHL affiliate, the Ontario Reign. On 22 April, the Kings signed Portillo to a two-year, entry-level contract through the 2023–24 season. During the 2023–24 season, in his rookie season, he appeared in 39 games with the Reign and posted a 24–11–3 record with a 2.50 GAA and .918 save percentage. His 24 wins were the most by a rookie goaltender in franchise history.

On 25 August 2024, Portillo signed a three-year contract extension with the Kings through the 2026–27 season. Portillo began the 2024–25 season with the Reign, where he appeared in six games and posted a 4–2–0 record with a 2.68 GAA and .906 save percentage. On 15 November 2024, he was recalled by the Kings on an emergency basis after placing starting goaltender Darcy Kuemper on the injured reserve. He made his NHL debut on 29 November 2024 in a game against the Anaheim Ducks, making 28 saves in a 2–1 victory to record his first career NHL win. During the third period, Portillo's skate blade was dislodged and forced him out of the game for 1:23, David Rittich entered in relief before being replaced by Portillo following the equipment fix.

== International play ==
Medal record

Representing Sweden

Ice hockey

World Junior Championships
Bronze medal – third place	2020 Czech Republic	

Portillo represented Sweden at the 2020 World Junior Ice Hockey Championships and won a bronze medal.

== Career statistics ==
=== Regular season and playoffs ===
			Regular season									Playoffs
Season	Team	League	GP	W	L	T/OT	MIN	GA	SO	GAA	SV%	GP	W	L	MIN	GA	SO	GAA	SV%
2019–20	Dubuque Fighting Saints	USHL	27	19	5	1	1,536	54	1	2.11	.915	—	—	—	—	—	—	—	—
2020–21	University of Michigan	B1G	7	4	1	0	359	10	0	1.67	.935	—	—	—	—	—	—	—	—
2021–22	University of Michigan	B1G	42	31	10	1	2,499	89	3	2.14	.926	—	—	—	—	—	—	—	—
2022–23	University of Michigan	B1G	38	25	11	2	2,300	115	0	3.00	.908	—	—	—	—	—	—	—	—
2023–24	Ontario Reign	AHL	39	24	11	3	2,307	96	2	2.50	.918	8	5	3	472	17	1	2.16	.916
2024–25	Ontario Reign	AHL	24	15	5	3	1,448	68	0	2.82	.889	—	—	—	—	—	—	—	—
2024–25	Los Angeles Kings	NHL	1	1	0	0	59	1	0	1.02	.966	—	—	—	—	—	—	—	—
2025–26	Ontario Reign	AHL	30	18	7	3	1,737	71	1	2.45	.907	3	1	2	196	7	0	2.14	.926
NHL totals			1	1	0	0	59	1	0	1.02	.966	—	—	—	—	—	—	—	—

== Awards and honours ==
Award	Year	Ref
College
Big Ten Second Team	2022	
Big Ten All-Tournament Team	2022	
Big Ten Tournament MVP	2022	

Awards and achievements
Preceded by Jack LaFontaine	Big Ten Tournament Most Outstanding Player; 2022	Succeeded by Adam Fantilli
