= Mason Lohrei =

American Ice Hockey Player of the Boston Bruins

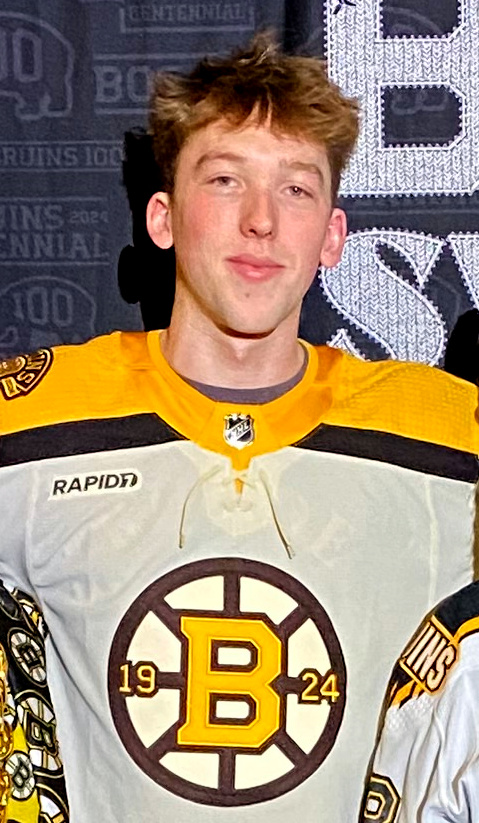
- Lohrei with the Boston Bruins in 2023
- Born: January 17, 2001 (age 25) Baton Rouge, Louisiana, U.S.
- Height: 6 ft 5 in (196 cm)
- Weight: 218 lb (99 kg; 15 st 8 lb)
- Position: Defense
- Shoots: Left
- NHL team: Boston Bruins
- National team: United States
- NHL draft: 58th overall, 2020; Boston Bruins
- Playing career: 2023–present

Mason Lohrei (/ˈloʊraɪ/; born January 17, 2001) is an American professional ice hockey player who is a defenseman for the Boston Bruins of the National Hockey League (NHL). He previously played college ice hockey for Ohio State University in the National Collegiate Athletic Association (NCAA). He is the first player in NHL history to have been born in the state of Louisiana.

== Early life ==
Lohrei was born in Baton Rouge while his father, David, was head coach of the East Coast Hockey League's Baton Rouge Kingfish. He moved with his family as a child first to Pennsylvania and then Wisconsin where he grew up. He attended Middleton High School in Middleton, Wisconsin, but transferred after his freshman year to Culver Academies in Culver, Indiana. As a sophomore at Culver, he made the decision to switch from forward to defense in order to get more playing time.

== Playing career ==
=== Amateur ===
Lohrei committed to playing college ice hockey for the Ohio State University during the 2021–22 season. Lohrei had an impressive first season with the Buckeyes, leading the team with 25 assists. As a result, he was named to the All-Big Ten Freshman Team.

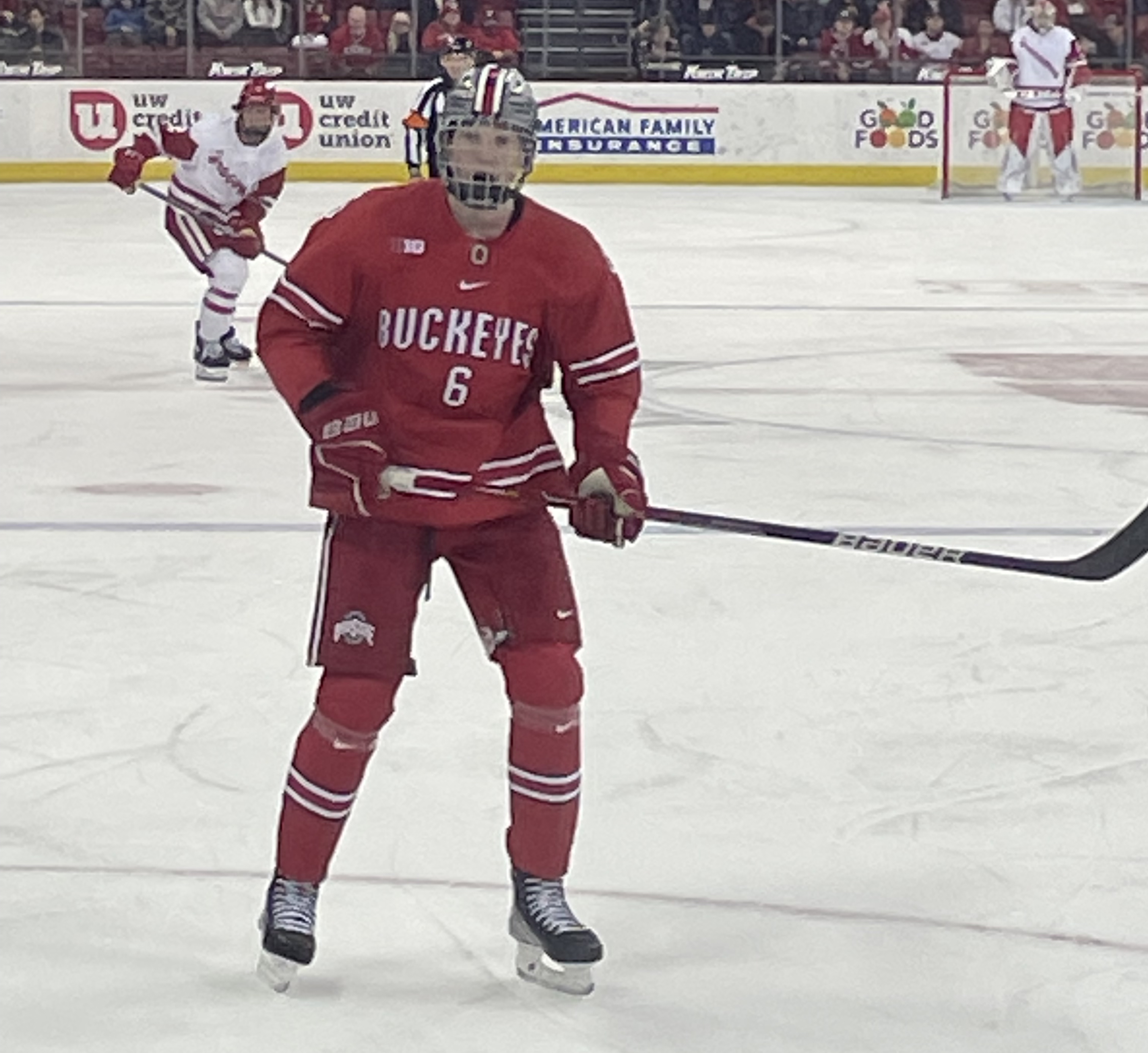
Lohrei playing for the Ohio State Buckeyes in a January 2023 game at the Kohl Center

Lohrei decided to return to the Buckeyes for the 2022–23 season. He finished second on the team in assists, and third in total points, with 28 and 32, respectively. Ohio State would make the NCAA tournament, but would lose in the second round to the eventual champion Quinnipiac Bobcats.

=== Professional ===
==== Boston Bruins ====
On March 31, 2023, the Providence Bruins announced that they had signed Lohrei to an amateur tryout contract for the remainder of the 2022–23 season, ending his collegiate career. He played in five regular season games with the club, registering one assist. He would also play in three playoff games, before the Bruins were eliminated by the Hartford Wolf Pack.

Lohrei started the 2023–24 season with Providence. However, it would not take long for him to receive a call-up to the NHL, as injuries to the Bruins defense corps caused him to make his NHL debut on November 2, 2023, against the Toronto Maple Leafs, where he also recorded his first NHL point, an assist on a goal by Pavel Zacha. With his debut, Lohrei became the first NHL player born in the state of Louisiana. He would score his first NHL goal a few games later against the Dallas Stars on November 6, 2023. Lohrei impressed in his first NHL stint, but was sent back down to Providence on November 25, 2023, following the injury recovery of Matt Grzelcyk. It would not take long for him to return to the NHL club, however, as he would return on December 7, 2023. Lohrei stayed with Boston until being sent down on January 20, 2024, once again due to Bruins defenseman Derek Forbort being fit to play. In his return to the NHL on February 21, 2024, Lohrei scored three assists against the Edmonton Oilers. Lohrei was once again sent back down to the AHL on April 12, 2024. On April 23, 2024, Lohrei was called back up to the Bruins, and made his NHL playoff debut in Game 3 of the first round against the Toronto Maple Leafs, and scored his first NHL playoff point in the following game, an assist on a goal by James van Riemsdyk. After the Bruins eliminated the Leafs in seven games, Lohrei scored his first NHL playoff goal in Game 1 of the second round against the Florida Panthers.

Lohrei entered the 2024–25 hoping to build off his rookie season, and was named to the Bruins opening night roster. Despite a rough season opener, which saw Lohrei on the ice for three Florida Panthers goals in a 6-4 loss, he quickly adjusted, and rode a three-game point streak where he scored a goal and three assists. Unfortunately for Lohrei and the Bruins, the season opener was more of an omen than they had hoped. Although Lohrei found some offensive success, including scoring eight assists in December, and two goals and five assists in January, Lohrei often found himself on the ice for opposing goals, resulting in a negative plus/minus. After the NHL trade deadline, which saw the Bruins sell off major pieces, including fellow defenseman Brandon Carlo, and the fact that the Bruins were without their top-two defensemen Charlie McAvoy and Hampus Lindholm due to injury, Lohrei inherited a large defensive role on a struggling Bruins team, which allowed him to develop and grow his game. However, the Bruins struggles would continue, and ultimately, Lohrei would finish the season with the lowest plus/minus in the NHL, at -43. He finished the season with five goals and 28 assists in 77 games.

On June 23, 2025, as an impending restricted free agent, Lohrei signed a two-year, $6.4 million extension with the Bruins.

Going into the 2025–26 season, Lohrei started off on the Bruins top pair alongside Charlie McAvoy. However, Lohrei struggled on the top pair, leading him to get called out by head coach Marco Sturm and being a healthy scratch a number of times in the early going. Lohrei was then moved to the third defensive pairing, and after showing signals of improvement, moved up to the top-four, even amidst trade rumors. Lohrei, as well as improving on defense, showcased his offensive potential, and on January 17, 2026, scored the first multi-goal game of his career against the Chicago Blackhawks. Although his offensive production would slow as the season went on, it was later revealed that he had been battling an upper-body injury throughout the season, and eventually had to miss time towards the end of the season due to it. Lohrei was not out for long, and returned for the final four games of Boston's season, helping the Bruins clinch the first wild card spot in the Stanley Cup playoffs, facing the Buffalo Sabres. However, Lohrei would struggle defensively in the first three games of the series, leading him to being a healthy scratch starting in Game 4. The Bruins would lose in six games to the Sabres, with Lohrei making no further appearances in the series.

== International play ==
Medal record

Representing United States

Ice hockey

World Championships
| Gold medal – first place | 2025 Sweden/Denmark | |

On April 24, 2025, after the Bruins season ended, Lohrei was named to the United States team for the 2025 IIHF World Championship. It was his first time representing the U.S. in any international competition. Lohrei appeared in five games, scoring one goal and two assists, and helped Team USA win their first gold medal since 1933.

Lohrei would again join the team for the 2026 IIHF World Championship, where he'd go scoreless in 8 games, as the U.S. was eliminated in the quarterfinals.

== Career statistics ==
=== Regular season and playoffs ===
| | | | Regular season | | | | | Playoffs |
| Season | Team | League | GP | G | A | Pts | PIM | GP | G | A | Pts | PIM |
|---|---|---|---|---|---|---|---|---|---|---|---|---|
| 2018–19 | Green Bay Gamblers | USHL | 9 | 0 | 0 | 0 | 4 | — | — | — | — | — |
| 2019–20 | Green Bay Gamblers | USHL | 48 | 8 | 29 | 37 | 26 | — | — | — | — | — |
| 2020–21 | Green Bay Gamblers | USHL | 48 | 19 | 40 | 59 | 74 | 2 | 1 | 1 | 2 | 0 |
| 2021–22 | Ohio State University | B1G | 31 | 4 | 25 | 29 | 20 | — | — | — | — | — |
| 2022–23 | Ohio State University | B1G | 40 | 4 | 28 | 32 | 26 | — | — | — | — | — |
| 2022–23 | Providence Bruins | AHL | 5 | 0 | 1 | 1 | 2 | 3 | 0 | 0 | 0 | 0 |
| 2023–24 | Providence Bruins | AHL | 21 | 1 | 15 | 16 | 14 | — | — | — | — | — |
| 2023–24 | Boston Bruins | NHL | 41 | 4 | 9 | 13 | 18 | 11 | 1 | 3 | 4 | 10 |
| 2024–25 | Boston Bruins | NHL | 77 | 5 | 28 | 33 | 16 | — | — | — | — | — |
| 2025–26 | Boston Bruins | NHL | 73 | 7 | 19 | 26 | 20 | 3 | 0 | 0 | 0 | 0 |
| NHL totals | | | 191 | 16 | 56 | 72 | 54 | 14 | 1 | 3 | 4 | 10 |

=== International Play ===
| Year | Team | Event | Result | GP | G | A | Pts | PIM |
|---|---|---|---|---|---|---|---|---|
| 2025 | United States | WC | 1st place, gold medalist(s) | 5 | 1 | 2 | 3 | 0 |
| 2026 | United States | WC | 8th | 8 | 0 | 0 | 0 | 0 |
| Senior totals | | | | 13 | 1 | 2 | 3 | 0 |

== Awards and honors ==
| Award | Year |
USHL
| USHL Most Assists by a Defenseman | 2020, 2021 |
| USHL Second All-Star Team | 2020 |
| USHL Most Goals by a Defenseman | 2021 |
| USHL Most Points by a Defenseman | 2021 |
| USHL Defenseman of the Year | 2021 |
| USHL First All-Star Team | 2021 |
College
| All-Big Ten Freshman Team | 2022 |
| All-Big Ten Second Team | 2023 |
