= Omaha Lancers =

US Tier I junior ice hockey team

- City: Omaha, Nebraska
- League: United States Hockey League
- Conference: Western
- Founded: 1986
- Home arena: Liberty First Credit Union Arena
- Colors: Orange, black, white
- Owner: Mike Picozzi
- Head coach: Ron Fogarty
- Media: FloHockey & MixIr (Broadcaster Joel Norman)

Franchise history
- 1986–2002: Omaha Lancers
- 2002–2004: River City Lancers
- 2004–present: Omaha Lancers

Championships
- Regular season titles: 5 Anderson Cups (1989–90, 1992–93, 2001–02, 2004–05 (shared), 2007–08)
- Playoff championships: 7 Clark Cups (1990, 1991, 1993, 1994, 1998, 2001, 2008); 2 USA Hockey Junior National Championships (2001, 2008)

The Omaha Lancers are a junior ice hockey team in the Western Conference of the United States Hockey League (USHL). Founded in 1986, the Lancers play at the Liberty First Credit Union Arena in Ralston, Nebraska. Previous arenas of use include the Omaha Civic Auditorium, Mid-America Center, and Hitchcock Arena.

The Lancers have claimed a league-record seven Clark Cup championships as playoff champions, five Anderson Cup titles as regular season champions, and two USA Hockey national championships. In addition, the Lancers have aided in the development of hundreds of NCAA Division I hockey players, National Hockey League (NHL) draft picks, and dozens of NHL players.

== History ==
In 2014, the majority ownership of the Lancers was bought by Crossbar Down, LLC, led by Anthony DiCesare, from the American Hockey Group, Inc., who had owned the franchise since 2004.

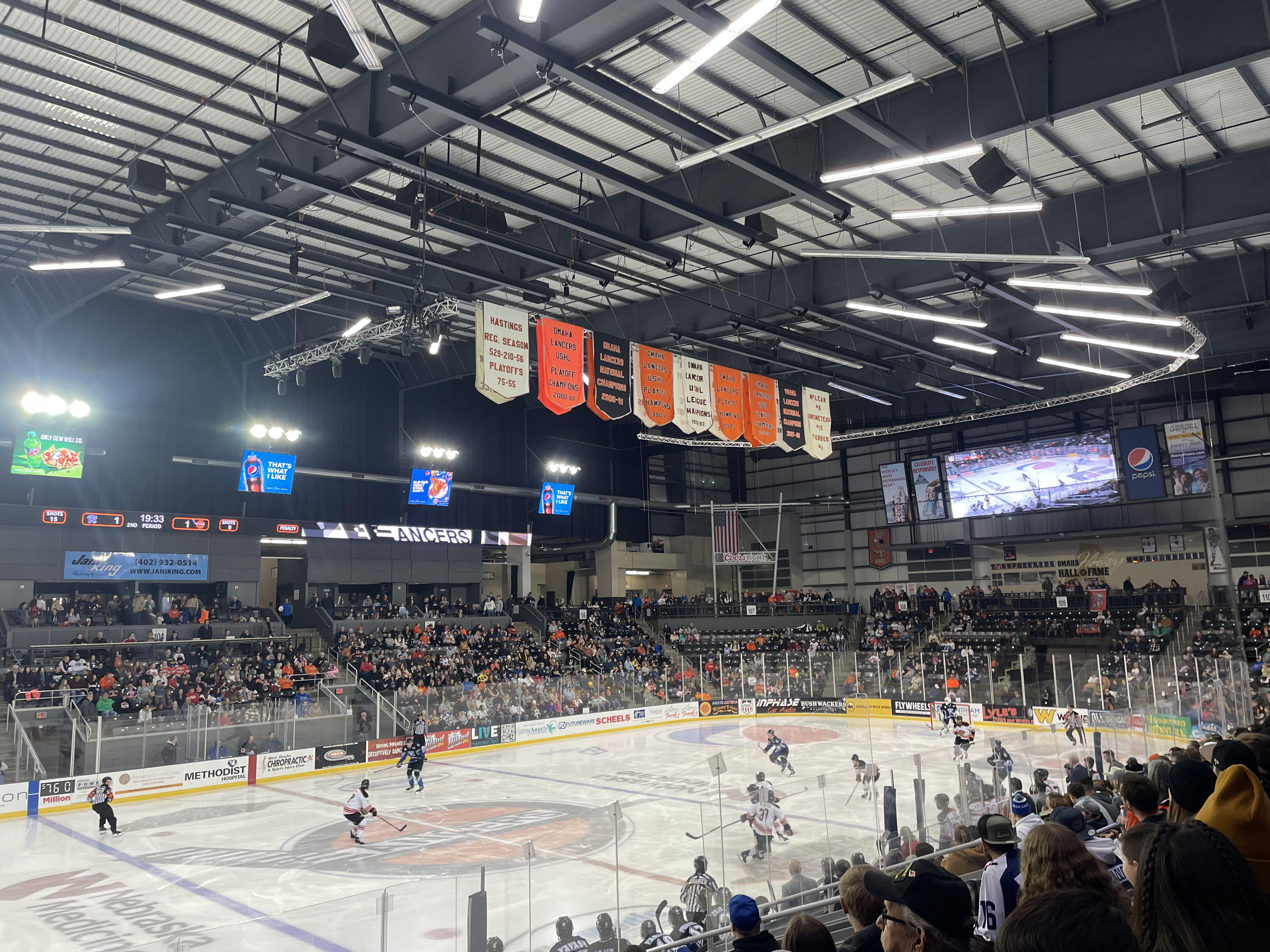
View of an Omaha Lancers hockey match taken in December 2023

On July 10, 2021, Chadd Cassidy was hired as head coach and general manager. During the 2021–22 season, the players boycotted the team and the coaching staff resigned on November 18 citing operational budget cuts causing inadequate player treatment and coaching the resources. The league then postponed the three scheduled weekend games and placed team president Dave DeLuca on administrative leave. Former Fort Wayne Komets' head coach Gary Graham was then brought in as interim head coach and the league designated Josh Mervis to oversee operations of the team while an investigation into the operations of the team was underway. In January 2022, the majority ownership of the Lancers was transferred from Anthony DiCesare to Mike Picozzi.

== NHL alumni ==
List of National Hockey League (NHL) alumni:

- Anthony Angello
- Casey Bailey
- Keith Ballard
- Jake Bischoff
- William Borgen
- Chase Bradley
- Jacob Bryson
- Matt Carle
- Noah Cates
- Joe Corvo
- Thatcher Demko
- Jakub Dobeš
- Ryan Donato
- Dan Ellis
- Nathan Gerbe
- Shane Gersich
- Alex Goligoski
- Jakob Forsbacka Karlsson
- Martin Hanzal
- Erik Haula
- Justin Holl
- Justin Johnson
- Fred Knipscheer
- Bryce Lampman
- Louis Leblanc
- Alex Lyon
- Ryan Malone
- Drew Miller
- Joe Motzko
- Josh Olson
- Mark Olver
- Will O'Neill
- Jed Ortmeyer
- Mike Peluso
- Nick Perbix
- Nick Petrecki
- Tucker Poolman
- Nate Raduns
- Akira Schmid
- Jimmy Schuldt
- Trevor Smith
- Brian Swanson
- Paul Stastny
- Yan Stastny
- Ryan Thang
- Duvie Westcott
- Patrick Wiercioch
- David Wilkie
