= 2019–20 USHL season =

2019–20 USHL Season
- League: United States Hockey League
- Sport: Ice hockey
- Duration: September 26, 2019 – March 12, 2020
- Games: 47–50
- Teams: 16

Draft
- Top draft pick: Sean Farrell
- Picked by: Chicago Steel

Regular season
- Anderson Cup: Chicago Steel
- Season MVP: Riese Gaber (Dubuque Fighting Saints)
- Top scorer: Mathieu De St. Phalle (Chicago Steel)

Clark Cup Playoffs
- Finals champions: None

USHL seasons
- 2018–19 2020–21

The 2019–20 USHL season was the 41st season of the United States Hockey League as an all-junior league. The regular season ran from September 26, 2019, to March 12, 2020.

At the end of the previous season, the Central Illinois Flying Aces ceased operations dropping the league to 16 teams.

On March 12, 2020, the USHL Board of Directors announced the unanimous decision to suspend play due to the ongoing COVID-19 pandemic. On March 18, 2020, the league cancelled the remainder of the regular season and 2020 Clark Cup playoffs, citing concerns for the health and safety of players and team personnel. On April 1, 2020, the Chicago Steel were named the regular season champions and awarded the Anderson Cup for accumulating 83 points in 49 games.

== Regular season ==
Final standings:

=== Eastern Conference ===
Team	GP	W	L	OTL	SOL	PTS	GF	GA
x – Chicago Steel	49	41	7	1	0	83	242	136
Dubuque Fighting Saints	48	33	13	2	0	68	180	123
Green Bay Gamblers	48	24	19	2	3	53	168	147
Team USA	48	25	21	1	1	52	188	200
Youngstown Phantoms	50	20	22	6	2	48	146	197
Muskegon Lumberjacks	49	21	23	5	0	47	161	175
Cedar Rapids RoughRiders	47	19	23	4	1	43	155	153
Madison Capitols	50	12	34	3	1	28	122	219

=== Western Conference ===
Team	GP	W	L	OTL	SOL	PTS	GF	GA
Waterloo Black Hawks	49	33	14	2	0	68	169	129
Omaha Lancers	50	27	15	7	1	62	167	143
Fargo Force	48	27	15	4	2	60	153	143
Tri-City Storm	48	24	17	5	2	55	150	147
Lincoln Stars	48	23	20	3	2	51	172	177
Sioux Falls Stampede	47	21	19	5	2	49	134	154
Des Moines Buccaneers	47	21	23	1	2	45	147	174
Sioux City Musketeers	48	16	24	7	1	40	137	170

x = clinched playoff berth; y = clinched conference title; z = clinched regular season title

== Statistical leaders ==
=== Scoring leaders ===
Players are listed by points, then goals.

Note: GP = Games played; G = Goals; A = Assists; Pts. = Points; PIM = Penalty minutes

Player	Team	GP	G	A	Pts	PIM
Mathieu De St. Phalle	Chicago Steel	49	30	30	60	38
Brendan Brisson	Chicago Steel	45	24	35	59	50
Sam Colangelo	Chicago Steel	44	28	30	58	47
Ty Jackson	Dubuque Fighting Saints	48	17	41	58	18
Gunnarwolfe Fontaine	Chicago Steel	45	26	31	57	18
Alexander Campbell	Omaha Lancers	46	18	39	57	8
Sean Farrell	Chicago Steel	44	15	41	56	28
Riese Gaber	Dubuque Fighting Saints	47	34	21	55	59
Dylan Jackson	Dubuque Fighting Saints	48	21	34	55	18
Trevor Kuntar	Youngstown Phantoms	44	28	35	53	83

=== Leading goaltenders ===
Note: GP = Games played; Mins = Minutes played; W = Wins; L = Losses; OTL = Overtime losses; SOL = Shootout losses; SO = Shutouts; GAA = Goals against average; SV% = Save percentage

Player	Team	GP	Mins	W	L	OTL	SOL	SO	GAA	SV%
Erik Portillo	Dubuque Fighting Saints	27	1536	19	5	1	0	1	2.11	0.915
Logan Stein	Waterloo Black Hawks	20	1058	12	6	0	0	4	2.33	0.911
Victor Östman	Chicago Steel	30	1742	25	4	0	0	2	2.34	0.913
Kyle McClellan	Omaha Lancers	52	1657	16	7	3	1	3	2.39	0.909
Jaxson Stauber	Sioux Falls Stampede	24	1420	14	6	2	2	1	2.45	0.918

== Post season awards ==
=== USHL awards ===
Award	Name	Team
Player of the Year	Riese Gaber	Dubuque Fighting Saints
Forward of the Year	Riese Gaber	Dubuque Fighting Saints
Defenseman of the Year	Owen Power	Chicago Steel
Rookie of the Year	Brendan Brisson	Chicago Steel
Goaltender of the Year	Erik Portillo	Dubuque Fighting Saints
Coach of the Year	Oliver David	Dubuque Fighting Saints
Scholar-Athlete	Kyle Aucoin	Tri-City Storm
Curt Hammer	Aidan Fulp	Des Moines Buccaneers
General Manager of the Year	Kalle Larsson	Dubuque Fighting Saints
Executive of the Year	Dan Lehv	Chicago Steel
Organization of the Year	Sioux Falls Stampede	

=== All-USHL First Team ===
Pos	Name	Team
G	Erik Portillo	Dubuque
D	Mitchell Miller	Tri-City
D	Owen Power	Chicago
F	Brendan Brisson	Chicago
F	Alexander Campbell	Omaha
F	Riese Gaber	Dubuque

=== All-USHL Second Team ===
Pos	Name	Team
G	Jaxson Stauber	Sioux Falls
D	Mason Lohrei	Green Bay
D	Nash Nienhuis	Omaha
F	Mathieu De St. Phalle	Chicago
F	Dylan Jackson	Dubuque
F	Trevor Kuntar	Youngstown

=== All-Rookie First Team ===
Pos	Name	Team
G	Simon Latkoczy	Madison
D	Christian Jimenez	Sioux City
D	Evan Nause	Sioux Falls
F	Brendan Brisson	Chicago
F	Ryan Kirwan	Madison
F	Matthew Knies	Tri-City

=== All-Rookie Second Team ===
Pos	Name	Team
G	Colin Purcell	Youngstown
D	Hank Kempf	Muskegon
D	Timothy Lovell	Des Moines
F	Tristan Broz	Fargo
F	Matt Choupani	Des Moines
F	Matt Coronato	Chicago
