= 2022–23 Minnesota Golden Gophers men's ice hockey season =

Big Ten, Champion NCAA Tournament, runner-up
- Conference: 1st Big Ten
- Home ice: 3M Arena at Mariucci

Rankings
- USCHO: #2
- USA Today: #2

Record
- Overall: 28–9–1
- Conference: 19–4–1
- Home: 15–4–0
- Road: 10–5–1
- Neutral: 2–0–0

Coaches and captains
- Head coach: Bob Motzko
- Assistant coaches: Steve Miller; Ben Gordon; Paul Martin; Brennan Poderzay
- Captain(s): Brock Faber; Jackson LaCombe; Jaxon Nelson

The 2022–23 Minnesota Golden Gophers men's ice hockey season was the 102nd season of play for the program and 33rd in the Big Ten. The Golden Gophers represented the University of Minnesota in the 2022–23 NCAA Division I men's ice hockey season, were coached by Bob Motzko in his fifth season, and played their home games at 3M Arena at Mariucci

== Season ==
=== Talented recruits ===
Minnesota lost several key players from their Frozen Four team of '22, however, coach Motzko brought in a batch of freshmen as replacements. Of the eleven newcomers, six had been selected in the NHL entry draft, two were first-round selection with being #3 overall pick Logan Cooley. Cooley centered a line with fellow first-rounder Jimmy Snuggerud and US Olympian Matthew Knies that turned into one of the team's primary offensive units On the defensive side, to a corps that already included top prospects Ryan Johnson, Brock Faber and Jackson LaCombe, Minnesota added a trio of blueliners. Coach Motzko would call the collection of seven players the 'Best I’ve ever had and will ever have'. On top of that, Minnesota also retained Justen Close in goal who had finished the year as the team's starter and produced strong statistics as the most juncture of the team's season.

=== Sorting out ===
With all that going for the Gophers, Minnesota was ranked #2 in the preseason polls, only behind defending National Champion Denver. The Gophers began well enough, winning their first three games, but they also went through a gauntlet of teams during the first month and a half of the season. Minnesota was only able to earn a split in three consecutive weekends but, because all of their opponents were ranked, the Gophers were still #3 by the beginning of November. Even after beginning their conference schedule, Minnesota continued to face very stiff opposition. However, by then the team was beginning to grow accustomed to one another and the Gophers won three out of four to start the month.

Just before Thanksgiving, Minnesota was set to face off against Michigan in a battle between top 3 teams. In what could possibly determine the conference champion, the high-anticipated matchup was derailed when an Adenovirus outbreak swept through both locker rooms. While Minnesota was without the services of Aaron Huglen and Justen Close, Michigan was much harder hit as several players, including star forward Adam Fantilli were ruled out while one, Steven Holtz, was so severely affected by the illness that he was placed on a ventilator and nearly died. Unsurprisingly, the Wolverines' hearts were not in the game and Minnesota managed to sweep the series.

=== Slow climb to the top ===
After Thanksgiving, Minnesota took a break from its conference slate and travelled down to Tempe to take on Arizona State. While the team seemed to have recovered from their viral issues, they seemed a bit off in the series and were only able to manage a split. The loss dropped Minnesota down to #4 which, while hardly a bad thing, was not up to par for a team that had pretentions for a National Championship. The team responded with four convincing wins to finish out the first half of the season and sat squarely at the top of the Big Ten standings.

Once the Gophers returned from the winter break, they had one final chance to prove their non-conference mettle against St. Cloud State. Unfortunately, the team's offense still appeared to be on vacation and was only able to score twice in the series. Fortunately, that was enough to earn a split and keep Minnesota at #3. A couple weeks later, the Gophers got their rematch with Michigan, who by then was completely recovered from the health scare. The two teams fought hard in the series and proved to be the equal of the other as both games went into overtime with each earning one win.

Minnesota regained their spot at #1 at the beginning of February after sweeping their season series over Michigan State, however, the Gophers dropped back down to #2 when a down Wisconsin team was able to eke out a 1–3 win. Minnesota was back on top of the polls a week later after taking down a sliding Penn State and finished the regular season as the top team in all three rankings.

=== Conference tournament ===
As the #1 team in the Big Ten, Minnesota received a bye into the semifinals. The team was able to sit at home and practice while they awaited the lowest-seeded survivor of the quarterfinal round. Michigan State ended up arriving in Minneapolis a week later and the time off seemed have negatively affected the Gophers as the team surrendered the first goal to the Spartans on the power play. After that, however, Minnesota took over the game and scored the next 5 markers to skate to a comfortable victory.

Minnesota hosted Michigan for the championship. While both teams were already guaranteed a spot in the NCAA tournament, Minnesota had already secured the top overall seed regardless of the game's outcome. With both teams playing for pride, the game was a seesaw affair that saw both clubs skating up and down the ice. The Gophers scored first but the two then exchanged leads three times with Michigan finishing out ahead by a narrow 3–4 score.

=== NCAA tournament ===
Though the loss in the conference championship was disappointing, Minnesota still had a chance to achieve their ultimate goal; winning the program's first national championship in 20 years. Minnesota began their tournament run in the best possible position. Not only was the team close to home at the Fargo regional, but they were set against Canisius in the first round. While the Golden Griffins were one of the final 16 teams, their national ranking was in the 40s. However, even with all of those advantages, Minnesota got off to a slow start. While the Gophers were able to get the first goal of the game on the power play, sloppy play afterwards enabled Canisius to tie the score less than three minutes later. The subpar performance continued into the second and Nick Bowman gave the Griffins their first lead of the match after just three minutes. While Minnesota was hardly in danger at the time, with more than half of the game left to play, the now-trailing team began to clean its play up and demonstrate that it was the superior club. Minnesota scored twice before the end of the second to regain the lead but Canisius was not going down without a fight. Despite being vastly outgunned, the Griffins were just one shot away from tying the game and had 20 minutes to work with. Luckily for Minnesota, Stefano Bottini got a bit overexcited at the start of the third and took a match penalty just 27 seconds into the period. Minnesota scored twice on the ensuing major penalty and opened the floodgates. With Canisius having to abandon its defensive effort to throw everything at Justen Close, Minnesota had a much easier time scoring and posted seven goals in the third period, turning what had once been a nail-biter into a runaway victory.

With a trip to Tampa on the line, Minnesota had to get past NCHC champion, St. Cloud State. After the slow start in the previous game, Minnesota made sure they didn't have a repeat and outshot the Huskies 14–6 in the first period. While they only managed to score once, the Gophers still held the lead going into the middle frame. St. Cloud tied the score on the power play but Minnesota regained the lead a few minutes later and never relinquished that advantage. Minnesota's fast and physical defensive corps stopped the rest of the Huskies' opportunities and carried the Gophers to a 4–1 win.

In the program's second consecutive trip to the Frozen Four, the Gophers took on Boston University for the fifth meeting between the two in the National Semifinal. With the historical record sitting at 2–2, the Terriers got off to a good start, scoring the first goal around the midway point of the first. After that, however, BU got into penalty trouble and Minnesota made them pay; the Gophers scored twice on the man advantage to take the lead before the start of the second. The Terriers got their own power play goal in the second to tie the game but Luke Mittelstadt scored twice in the first four minutes of the third to put Minnesota ahead for good. A pair of empty netters at the end extended their lead and ensured that Minnesota reached the championship game for the first time in 9 years.

==== National Championship ====
With just Quinnipiac left in their way, Minnesota was hoping to be the first #1 seed to win the championship since Denver in 2017. The Gophers began with a defensive front and counterpunched. While that may have played into Quinnipiac's hands, as the Bobcats were the top defensive team in the country, a fanned clearing attempt was intercepted by Connor Kurth and, after drawing Yaniv Perets out of position, he slipped the puck in front of the cage where John Mittelstadt knocked in his fourth of the season for the game's first goal less than six minutes into the game. The defensive struggle resumed afterwards and neither team got much in the way of scoring opportunities for the rest of the period.

Early in the second, after a faceoff win in the Bobcat's end, Brock Faber purposefully fired the puck from the blueline wide. The rubber bounced off of the end wall right to Jaxon Nelson who chipped the puck into the top corner of the net for a 2–0 lead. At this point, Minnesota was in full control of the game and it appeared that the Gophers were going to glide to the program's 6th National Championship. However, while Quinnipiac was the #1 defense, they also possessed the #3 offense and the Bobcats began leaning a bit more on the gas and were finally able to solve Justen Close a few minutes later. Minnesota pulled back and played defense for most of the rest of the game, trying to win with their 2–1 lead.

While they were widely outshot in the final half of the game, Minnesota did get several opportunities to extend their lead but bouncing and rolling pucks ended up causing all chances to miss. With about five minutes to play, Logan Cooley got into a scuffle with one of the Bobcats. While one referee signaled that he would give matching minors to both players if they continued, the other had already called Cooley for a high-sticking penalty. The Minnesota faithful were up in arms about the controversial call but the Gophers still had to slow down a strong Quinnipiac power play. The Bobcats ended up getting several good look at the net but Minnesota was able to stop everything, allowing Cooley to return to the ice. Unfortunately, just as he was getting into the play, Collin Graf fired a low shot on goal that sneaked between the legs of Close and bounced into the net. Suddenly, Minnesota found itself having to restart its offense but the Gophers seemed able to get back on their horses. Almost immediately after the ensuing faceoff, Minnesota broke in on the Bobcats' goal and had a chance to regain their lead but a strong defensive effort stopped the Gopher attack. The two teams continued to test one another for the remainder of the period but ended up needing overtime to decide the game.

Jaxon Nelson won the opening draw of the 4th period but did so too strongly and the puck ended up sailing into the Quinnipiac bench. On the ensuing draw, also at center ice, the Bobcats took control of the puck and, using a set play, engineered a quick 2-on-1 that resulted in the winning goal by Jacob Quillan. While the Bobcats celebrated, Minnesota desperately hoped that the play was offsides. When those faint hopes were dashed, the team could only watch as the championship, which had been within their grasp only minutes before, was captured by another team.

== Departures ==
Player	Position	Nationality	Cause
Brennan Boynton	Goaltender	United States	Transferred to American International
Benjamin Brinkman	Defenseman	United States	Graduate transfer to Notre Dame
Tristan Broz	Forward	United States	Transferred to Denver
Grant Cruikshank	Forward	United States	Graduate transfer to St. Cloud State
Matt Denman	Defenseman	United States	Graduation (retired)
Chaz Lucius	Forward	United States	Signed professional contract (Winnipeg Jets)
Blake McLaughlin	Forward	United States	Graduation (signed with Anaheim Ducks)
Ben Meyers	Forward	United States	Signed professional contract (Colorado Avalanche)
Jack Perbix	Forward/Defenseman	United States	Transferred to Western Michigan
Sam Rossini	Defenseman	United States	Graduation (retired)
Jonny Sorenson	Forward	United States	Transferred to Alaska
Sammy Walker	Forward	United States	Graduation (signed with Minnesota Wild)
Noah Weber	Forward	United States	Left program (retired)

== Recruiting ==
Player	Position	Nationality	Age	Notes
Ryan Chesley	Defenseman	United States	18	Mahtomedi, MN; selected 37th overall in 2022
Logan Cooley	Forward	United States	18	Pittsburgh, PA; selected 3rd overall in 2022
Connor Kurth	Forward	United States	19	Elk River, MN; selected 192nd overall in 2022
Brody Lamb	Forward	United States	19	Rochester, MN; selected 104th overall in 2021
John Mittelstadt	Forward	United States	20	Eden Prairie, MN
Luke Mittelstadt	Defenseman	United States	19	Eden Prairie, MN
Garrett Pinoniemi	Forward	United States	21	Robbinsdale, MN
Jimmy Snuggerud	Forward	United States	18	Chaska, MN; selected 23rd overall in 2022
Charlie Strobel	Forward	United States	21	Stillwater, MN
Cal Thomas	Defenseman	United States	19	Maple Grove, MN; selected 171st overall in 2021
Zach Wiese	Goaltender	United States	20	Owatonna, MN

== Roster ==
As of August 19, 2022.

No.	Nat.	Player	Class	Pos	Height	Weight	DoB	Hometown	Previous team	NHL rights
1	(Canada)	Justen Close	Senior	G	5' 10" (1.78 m)	175 lb (79 kg)	1998-05-20	Kindersley, Saskatchewan	Kindersley Klippers (SJHL)	—
2	(United States)	Jackson LaCombe (C)	Senior	D	6' 2" (1.88 m)	200 lb (91 kg)	2001-01-09	Eden Prairie, Minnesota	Shattuck-Saint Mary's (Midget AAA)	ANA, 39th overall 2019
4	(United States)	Mike Koster	Junior	D	5' 10" (1.78 m)	180 lb (82 kg)	2001-04-13	Chaska, Minnesota	Tri-City Storm (USHL)	TOR, 146th overall 2019
6	(United States)	Cal Thomas	Freshman	D	6' 0" (1.83 m)	185 lb (84 kg)	2003-05-08	Maple Grove, Minnesota	Chicago Steel (USHL)	ARI, 171st overall 2021
7	(United States)	Aaron Huglen	Sophomore	F	6' 0" (1.83 m)	170 lb (77 kg)	2001-03-06	Roseau, Minnesota	Fargo Force (USHL)	BUF, 102nd overall 2019
10	(United States)	Connor Kurth	Freshman	F	5' 11" (1.8 m)	215 lb (98 kg)	2003-07-30	Elk River, Minnesota	Dubuque Fighting Saints (USHL)	TBL, 190th overall 2022
13	(United States)	Garrett Pinoniemi	Freshman	F	6' 0" (1.83 m)	170 lb (77 kg)	2001-07-15	Robbinsdale, Minnesota	Sioux Falls Stampede (USHL)	—
14	(United States)	Brock Faber (C)	Junior	D	6' 1" (1.85 m)	200 lb (91 kg)	2002-08-22	Maple Grove, Minnesota	USNTDP (USHL)	MIN, 45th overall 2020
16	(United States)	Colin Schmidt	Senior	F	6' 4" (1.93 m)	230 lb (104 kg)	2000-01-06	Wayzata, Minnesota	Union (ECAC)	—
17	(United States)	Brody Lamb	Freshman	F	6' 1" (1.85 m)	175 lb (79 kg)	2003-08-30	Byron, Minnesota	Green Bay Gamblers (USHL)	NYR, 104th overall 2021
18	(United States)	Mason Nevers	Junior	F	5' 11" (1.8 m)	175 lb (79 kg)	2001-04-03	Edina, Minnesota	Des Moines Buccaneers (USHL)	—
19	(United States)	John Mittelstadt	Freshman	F	5' 9" (1.75 m)	175 lb (79 kg)	2001-10-27	Eden Prairie, Minnesota	Green Bay Gamblers (USHL)	—
20	(United States)	Luke Mittelstadt	Freshman	D	5' 11" (1.8 m)	175 lb (79 kg)	2003-01-22	Eden Prairie, Minnesota	Madison Capitols (USHL)	—
22	(United States)	Bryce Brodzinski	Senior	F	6' 0" (1.83 m)	205 lb (93 kg)	2000-08-09	Blaine, Minnesota	Blaine High School (USHS–MN)	PHI, 196th overall 2019
23	(United States)	Ryan Johnson	Senior	D	6' 1" (1.85 m)	190 lb (86 kg)	2001-07-24	Irvine, California	Sioux Falls Stampede (USHL)	BUF, 31st overall 2019
24	(United States)	Jaxon Nelson (C)	Senior	F	6' 4" (1.93 m)	225 lb (102 kg)	2000-03-30	Magnolia, Minnesota	Omaha Lancers (USHL)	—
26	(United States)	Carl Fish	Junior	D	6' 3" (1.91 m)	210 lb (95 kg)	1999-11-09	Saint Paul, Minnesota	Bismarck Bobcats (NAHL)	—
27	(United States)	Charlie Strobel	Freshman	F	6' 1" (1.85 m)	190 lb (86 kg)	2001-07-09	Stillwater, Minnesota	Trail Smoke Eaters (BCHL)	—
30	(United States)	Zach Wiese	Freshman	G	5' 10" (1.78 m)	210 lb (95 kg)	2002-01-02	Owatonna, Minnesota	Rochester Grizzlies (NA3HL)	—
31	(United States)	Owen Bartoszkiewicz	Freshman	G	6' 1" (1.85 m)	195 lb (88 kg)	2003-03-11	Northville, Michigan	Youngstown Phantoms (USHL)	—
55	(United States)	Matt Staudacher	Senior	D	6' 1" (1.85 m)	200 lb (91 kg)	2000-02-07	Fenton, Michigan	Muskegon Lumberjacks (USHL)	—
71	(United States)	Ryan Chesley	Freshman	D	6' 0" (1.83 m)	200 lb (91 kg)	2004-02-27	Mahtomedi, Minnesota	USNTDP (USHL)	WSH, 37th overall 2022
77	(United States)	Rhett Pitlick	Sophomore	F	5' 10" (1.78 m)	165 lb (75 kg)	2001-02-07	Plymouth, Minnesota	Tri-City Storm (USHL)	MTL, 131st overall 2019
81	(United States)	Jimmy Snuggerud	Freshman	F	6' 1" (1.85 m)	185 lb (84 kg)	2004-06-01	Chaska, Minnesota	USNTDP (USHL)	STL, 23rd overall 2022
89	(United States)	Matthew Knies	Sophomore	F	6' 3" (1.91 m)	210 lb (95 kg)	2002-10-17	Phoenix, Arizona	Tri-City Storm (USHL)	TOR, 57th overall 2021
92	(United States)	Logan Cooley	Freshman	F	5' 10" (1.78 m)	180 lb (82 kg)	2004-05-04	Pittsburgh, Pennsylvania	USNTDP (USHL)	ARI, 3rd overall 2022

== Standings ==
2022–23 Big Ten ice hockey Standings
	Conference record										Overall record					
	GP	W	L	T	OTW	OTL	3/SW	PTS	GF	GA	GP	W	L	T	GF	GA
#2 Minnesota †	24	19	4	1	2	1	0	57	106	50	40	29	10	1	168	90
#3 Michigan *	24	12	10	2	3	3	0	38	82	79	41	26	12	3	171	128
#7 Ohio State	24	11	11	2	0	0	1	36	69	63	40	21	16	3	131	101
Notre Dame	24	10	10	4	2	0	3	35	52	60	37	16	16	5	85	97
#19 Michigan State	24	10	12	2	1	1	2	34	65	80	38	18	18	2	107	115
#8 Penn State	24	10	13	1	0	3	0	34	71	75	39	22	16	1	129	106
Wisconsin	24	6	18	0	0	0	0	18	54	92	36	13	23	0	94	126
Championship: March 18, 2023 † indicates conference regular season champion * indicates conference tournament champion Rankings: USCHO.com Top 20 Poll

== Schedule and results ==
Date	Time	Opponent^{#}	Rank^{#}	Site	TV	Decision	Result	Attendance	Record
Regular Season
October 1	7:00 PM	Lindenwood*	#2	3M Arena at Mariucci • Minneapolis, MN	BSN+	Close	W 4–0	6,867	1–0–0
October 2	7:00 PM	Lindenwood*	#2	3M Arena at Mariucci • Minneapolis, MN	BSN+	Bartoszkiewicz	W 6–4	5,985	2–0–0
October 7	7:07 PM	#5 Minnesota State*	#2	3M Arena at Mariucci • Minneapolis, MN	BSN	Close	W 4–1	8,472	3–0–0
October 8	6:00 PM	at #5 Minnesota State*	#2	Mayo Clinic Health System Event Center • Mankato, MN	FOX 9+	Close	L 3–2	4,911	3–1–0
October 21	7:00 PM	#7 North Dakota*	#1	3M Arena at Mariucci • Minneapolis, MN (Rivalry)	BSN+	Close	W 3–2 ^{OT}	10,418	4–1–0
October 22	7:00 PM	#7 North Dakota*	#1	3M Arena at Mariucci • Minneapolis, MN (Rivalry)	BSN	Close	L 4–5 ^{OT}	10,193	4–2–0
October 28	5:30 PM	at #11 Ohio State	#1	Value City Arena • Columbus, OH	BTN	Close	L 4–6	3,242	4–3–0 (0–1–0)
October 29	4:00 PM	at #11 Ohio State	#1	Value City Arena • Columbus, OH	BTN+	Close	W 4–2	3,336	5–3–0 (1–1–0)
November 4	7:00 PM	#12 Notre Dame	#3	3M Arena at Mariucci • Minneapolis, MN	BTN+	Close	W 4–1	7,774	6–3–0 (2–1–0)
November 5	7:00 PM	#12 Notre Dame	#3	3M Arena at Mariucci • Minneapolis, MN	BTN+	Close	W 3–0	8,291	7–3–0 (3–1–0)
November 10	7:00 PM	#8 Penn State	#1	3M Arena at Mariucci • Minneapolis, MN	BTN	Close	L 2–4	6,664	7–4–0 (3–2–0)
November 11	7:00 PM	#8 Penn State	#1	3M Arena at Mariucci • Minneapolis, MN	BTN+	Close	W 3–1	8,921	8–4–0 (4–2–0)
November 18	5:30 PM	at #3 Michigan	#2	Yost Ice Arena • Ann Arbor, MI (Rivalry)	BTN	Bartoszkiewicz	W 5–2	5,800	9–4–0 (5–2–0)
November 19	5:00 PM	at #3 Michigan	#2	Yost Ice Arena • Ann Arbor, MI (Rivalry)	BTN	Bartoszkiewicz	W 6–3	5,800	10–4–0 (6–2–0)
November 25	8:00 PM	at Arizona State*	#2	Mullett Arena • Tempe, AZ	Pac-12 Insider	Close	W 3–2	5,109	11–4–0
November 26	8:00 PM	at Arizona State*	#2	Mullett Arena • Tempe, AZ	Pac-12 Insider	Close	L 5–6 ^{OT}	5,153	11–5–0
December 2	5:30 PM	at #13 Michigan State	#4	Munn Ice Arena • East Lansing, MI	BTN	Close	W 5–0	6,555	12–5–0 (7–2–0)
December 3	5:00 PM	at #13 Michigan State	#4	Munn Ice Arena • East Lansing, MI	BTN	Close	W 6–3	6,555	13–5–0 (8–2–0)
December 9	8:00 PM	Wisconsin	#3	3M Arena at Mariucci • Minneapolis, MN (Rivalry)	BTN	Close	W 7–1	8,961	14–5–0 (9–2–0)
December 10	6:00 PM	Wisconsin	#3	3M Arena at Mariucci • Minneapolis, MN (Rivalry)	BSN, BSW	Close	W 6–4	9,713	15–5–0 (10–2–0)
December 29	3:00 PM	USNTDP*	#3	3M Arena at Mariucci • Minneapolis, MN (Exhibition)	BTN+	Close	W 3–2	8,593	—
December 31	5:00 PM	at Bemidji State*	#3	Sanford Center • Bemidji, MN (Exhibition)	FloHockey, FOX 9+	Bartoszkiewicz	W 2–1	4,373	—
January 7	6:00 PM	at #4 St. Cloud State*	#3	Herb Brooks National Hockey Center • St. Cloud, MN (Rivalry)	CBSSN, FOX 9+	Close	L 0–3	6,051	15–6–0
January 8	3:00 PM	#4 St. Cloud State*	#3	3M Arena at Mariucci • Minneapolis, MN (Rivalry)	BSN	Close	W 2–1 ^{OT}	10,192	16–6–0
January 13	6:30 PM	at Notre Dame	#2	Compton Family Ice Arena • Notre Dame, IN	Peacock	Close	T 2–2 ^{SOL}	4,984	16–6–1 (10–2–1)
January 14	5:00 PM	at Notre Dame	#2	Compton Family Ice Arena • Notre Dame, IN	Peacock	Close	W 3–0	5,022	17–6–1 (11–2–1)
January 20	7:00 PM	#8 Michigan	#2	3M Arena at Mariucci • Minneapolis, MN (Rivalry)	BSN	Close	W 4–3 ^{OT}	10,300	18–6–1 (12–2–1)
January 21	7:00 PM	#8 Michigan	#2	3M Arena at Mariucci • Minneapolis, MN (Rivalry)	BSN, BTN	Close	L 4–5 ^{OT}	10,455	18–7–1 (12–3–1)
January 27	7:00 PM	#15 Michigan State	#2	3M Arena at Mariucci • Minneapolis, MN	BSN+	Close	W 8–0	10,220	19–7–1 (13–3–1)
January 28	4:00 PM	#15 Michigan State	#2	3M Arena at Mariucci • Minneapolis, MN	BSN+	Close	W 6–3	10,253	20–7–1 (14–3–1)
February 10	7:00 PM	at Wisconsin	#1	Kohl Center • Madison, WI (Rivalry)	BSN+	Close	W 4–1	8,018	21–7–1 (15–3–1)
February 11	5:00 PM	at Wisconsin	#1	Kohl Center • Madison, MI (Rivalry)	BTN	Close	L 1–3	11,075	21–8–1 (15–4–1)
February 17	5:30 PM	at #7 Penn State	#2	Pegula Ice Arena • University Park, PA	BTN	Close	W 7–2	6,369	22–8–1 (16–4–1)
February 18	5:30 PM	at #7 Penn State	#2	Pegula Ice Arena • University Park, PA	BTN	Close	W 3–2 ^{OT}	6,461	23–8–1 (17–4–1)
February 24	8:00 PM	#8 Ohio State	#1	3M Arena at Mariucci • Minneapolis, MN	ESPNU	Close	W 4–0	9,968	24–8–1 (18–4–1)
February 25	4:30 PM	#8 Ohio State	#1	3M Arena at Mariucci • Minneapolis, MN	BTN	Close	W 5–2	10,140	25–8–1 (19–4–1)
Big Ten Tournament
March 11	9:00 PM	#18 Michigan State*	#1	3M Arena at Mariucci • Minneapolis, MN (Semifinal)	BTN, ESPN+	Close	W 5–1	9,029	26–8–1
March 18	7:00 PM	#4 Michigan*	#1	3M Arena at Mariucci • Minneapolis, MN (Championship)	BTN, ESPN+	Close	L 3–4	10,305	26–9–1
NCAA Tournament
March 23	7:00 PM	vs. Canisius*	#1	Scheels Arena • Fargo, North Dakota (West Regional Semifinal)	ESPN2	Close	W 9–2	5,061	27–9–1
March 26	6:30 PM	vs. #6 St. Cloud State*	#1	Scheels Arena • Fargo, North Dakota (West Regional Final)	ESPNU	Close	W 4–1	5,326	28–9–1
April 6	4:00 PM	vs. #5 Boston University*	#1	Amalie Arena • Tampa, Florida (National Semifinal)	ESPN2	Close	W 6–2	19,119	29–9–1
April 8	7:00 PM	vs. #3 Quinnipiac*	#1	Amalie Arena • Tampa, Florida (National Championship)	ESPN2	Close	L 2–3 ^{OT}	19,444	29–10–1
*Non-conference game. ^{#}Rankings from USCHO.com Poll. All times are in Central Time. Source:

== National Championship game ==
April 8, 2023; 8:00 PM	(W1) Minnesota	2–3 (OT) (1–0, 1–1, 0–1, 0–1)	(NE1) Quinnipiac	Amalie Arena; Attendance: 19,444

Game reference
Referees: Joe Sullivan; Ryan Hersey; Linesmen: John Grandt; Tyler Liffrig

Scoring summary
Period	Team	Goal	Assist(s)	Time	Score
1st	MIN	John Mittelstadt (4)	Kurth	05:35	1–0 MIN
2nd	MIN	Jaxon Nelson (10)	Faber	25:24	2–0 MIN
2nd	QU	Cristophe Tellier (8)	Metsa	27:41	2–1 MIN
3rd	QU	Collin Graf (21) – EA	Metsa, Lipkin	57:13	2–2
1st Overtime	QU	Jacob Quillan (19) – GW	Lipkin, Metsa	60:10	3–2 QU
Penalty summary
Period	Team	Player	Penalty	Time	PIM
1st	QU	Skyler Brind'Amour	Contact to the Head	00:21	2:00
2nd	MIN	Jimmy Snuggerud	Tripping	32:32	2:00
3rd	QU	Skyler Brind'Amour	Hooking	43:17	2:00
3rd	MIN	Logan Cooley	High-sticking	55:08	2:00

Shots by period
Team	1	2	3	OT	T
Quinnipiac	4	11	14	1	30
Minnesota	7	6	2	0	15

Goaltenders
Team	Name	Saves	Goals against	Time on ice
QU	Yaniv Perets	13	2	59:29
MIN	Justen Close	27	3	60:10

== Scoring statistics ==
Name	Position	Games	Goals	Assists	Points	PIM
Logan Cooley	C	39	22	38	60	42
Jimmy Snuggerud	RW	40	21	29	50	42
Matthew Knies	LW	40	21	21	42	29
Jackson LaCombe	D	37	9	26	35	13
Bryce Brodzinski	RW	40	19	12	31	12
Michael Koster	D	40	6	23	29	8
Jaxon Nelson	C	40	10	17	27	10
Brock Faber	D	38	4	23	27	12
Rhett Pitlick	LW	40	11	14	25	18
Mason Nevers	C	40	10	13	23	2
Luke Mittelstadt	D	38	5	16	21	6
Ryan Johnson	D	40	4	14	18	8
Aaron Huglen	C/W	38	7	10	17	18
Connor Kurth	F	38	7	4	11	35
Ryan Chesley	D	36	2	8	10	13
Brody Lamb	RW	39	4	4	8	4
Cal Thomas	D	40	0	6	6	4
John Mittelstadt	F	30	4	1	5	8
Garrett Pinoniemi	C	29	2	1	3	4
Charlie Strobel	C	20	0	3	3	2
Carl Fish	D	7	0	1	1	2
Justen Close	G	37	0	1	1	2
Owen Bartoszkiewicz	G	6	0	0	0	0
Colin Schmidt	C	9	0	0	0	2
Total			168	285	453	296

== Goaltending statistics ==
Name	Games	Minutes	Wins	Losses	Ties	Goals against	Saves	Shut outs	SV %	GAA
Justen Close	37	2170:22	26	10	1	73	930	6	.930	2.02
Owen Bartoszkiewicz	6	242:12	3	0	0	15	113	0	.883	3.72
Empty Net	-	11:38	-	-	-	2	-	-	-	-
Total	40	2424:12	29	10	1	90	1043	6	.921	2.23

== Rankings ==
Poll	Week																											
Poll	Pre	1	2	3	4	5	6	7	8	9	10	11	12	13	14	15	16	17	18	19	20	21	22	23	24	25	26	27 (Final)
USCHO.com	2 (8)	-	2 (6)	2 (1)	1 (31)	1 (21)	3 (5)	1 (32)	2 (5)	2 (7)	4 (3)	3 (6)	3 (9)	-	3 (11)	2 (5)	2 (6)	2 (13)	1 (38)	1 (36)	2 (16)	1 (25)	1 (37)	1 (38)	1 (38)	1 (34)	-	2
USA Today	2 (7)	2 (7)	2 (4)	2 (1)	1 (21)	1 (14)	3 (3)	1 (24)	2 (3)	2 (9)	1 (11)	2 (16)	2 (13)	1 (15)	1 (15)	2 (9)	2 (4)	2 (12)	1 (27)	1 (31)	2 (12)	1 (17)	1 (27)	1 (29)	1 (28)	1 (27)	1 (30)	2

Note: USCHO did not release a poll in weeks 1, 13, or 26.

== Awards and honors ==
Player	Award	Ref
Bob Motzko	Spencer Penrose Award	
Brock Faber	AHCA West All-American First Team	
Logan Cooley	AHCA West All-American First Team	
Matthew Knies	AHCA West All-American First Team	
Matthew Knies	Big Ten Player of the Year	
Brock Faber	Big Ten Defensive Player of the Year	
Logan Cooley	Big Ten Scoring Champion	
Jimmy Snuggerud	Big Ten Scoring Champion	
Bob Motzko	Big Ten Coach of the Year	
Brock Faber	Big Ten First Team	
Logan Cooley	Big Ten First Team	
Matthew Knies	Big Ten First Team	
Justen Close	Big Ten Second Team	
Jackson LaCombe	Big Ten Second Team	
Jimmy Snuggerud	Big Ten Second Team	
Luke Mittelstadt	Big Ten Freshman Team	
Logan Cooley	Big Ten Freshman Team	
Jimmy Snuggerud	Big Ten Freshman Team	
Justen Close	Big Ten All-Tournament Team	
Logan Cooley	Big Ten All-Tournament Team	
Luke Mittelstadt	NCAA All-Tournament team	
Logan Cooley	NCAA All-Tournament team	

== Players drafted into the NHL ==
=== 2023 NHL entry draft ===
Round	Pick	Player	NHL team
1	19	Oliver Moore ^{†}	Chicago Blackhawks
7	197	Luke Mittelstadt	Montreal Canadiens
7	213	James Clark ^{†}	Minnesota Wild

† incoming freshman
