= 2023 NCAA Division I men's ice hockey tournament =

- Teams: 16
- Finals site: Amalie Arena, Tampa, Florida
- Champions: Quinnipiac Bobcats (1st title)
- Runner-up: Minnesota Golden Gophers (13th title game)
- Semifinalists: Boston University Terriers (23rd Frozen Four); Michigan Wolverines (27th Frozen Four)
- Winning coach: Rand Pecknold (1st title)
- MOP: Jacob Quillan (Quinnipiac)
- Attendance: 19,444 (Championship); 57,682 (Frozen Four); 123,525 (Tournament)

The 2023 NCAA Division I men's ice hockey tournament was the national championship tournament for men's college ice hockey in the United States held from March 23-April 8, 2023. The tournament involved 16 teams in single-elimination play to determine the national champion at the Division I level of the National Collegiate Athletic Association (NCAA), the highest level of competition in college hockey. The tournament's Frozen Four—the semifinals and finals—were hosted by the University of Wisconsin–Madison and Tampa Bay Sports Commission at the Amalie Arena in Tampa, Florida.

Quinnipiac defeated Minnesota 3–2 in overtime to win the program's first NCAA title. The game marked the fifteenth time the NCAA championship game has gone to overtime, and the first time since Minnesota–Duluth's win over Michigan in 2011.

== Tournament procedure ==
2023 Regionals (blue) and Frozen Four (red)

The tournament is composed of four groups of four teams in regional brackets. The four regionals are officially named after their geographic areas. The following are the sites for the 2023 regionals: Regional semifinals and finals

- March 23 & 25

East Regional, SNHU Arena – Manchester, New Hampshire (Host: New Hampshire)
West Regional, Scheels Arena – Fargo, North Dakota (Host: North Dakota)

- March 24 & 26

Northeast Regional, Total Mortgage Arena – Bridgeport, Connecticut (Hosts: Yale and Sacred Heart)
Midwest Regional, PPL Center – Allentown, Pennsylvania (Host: Penn State)

National semifinals and championship (Frozen Four and championship)

- April 6–8

Amalie Arena – Tampa, Florida (Host: Wisconsin)

== Qualifying teams ==
The at-large bids and seeding for each team in the tournament was announced on March 19, 2023 on ESPNU.

The Big Ten and ECAC each received four, the NCHC received three, the CCHA and Hockey East both received two, and one team from Atlantic Hockey received a berth.

Midwest Regional – Allentown							East Regional – Manchester						
Seed	School	Conference	Record	Berth type	Appearance	Last bid	Seed	School	Conference	Record	Berth type	Appearance	Last bid
1	Michigan (3)	Big Ten	24–11–3	Tournament champion	40th	2022	1	Denver (4)	NCHC	30–9–0	At-large bid	30th	2022
2	Penn State	Big Ten	21–15–1	At-large bid	3rd	2018	2	Boston University	Hockey East	27–10–0	Tournament champion	38th	2021
3	Michigan Tech	CCHA	24–10–4	At-large bid	14th	2022	3	Western Michigan	NCHC	23–14–1	At-large bid	8th	2022
4	Colgate	ECAC	19–15–5	Tournament champion	6th	2014	4	Cornell	ECAC	20–10–2	At-large bid	23rd	2019
Northeast Regional – Bridgeport							West Regional – Fargo						
Seed	School	Conference	Record	Berth type	Appearance	Last bid	Seed	School	Conference	Record	Berth type	Appearance	Last bid
1	Quinnipiac (2)	ECAC	30–4–3	At-large bid	9th	2022	1	Minnesota (1)	Big Ten	26–9–1	At-large bid	40th	2022
2	Harvard	ECAC	24–7–2	At-large bid	27th	2022	2	St. Cloud State	NCHC	24–12–3	Tournament champion	17th	2022
3	Ohio State	Big Ten	20–15–3	At-large bid	10th	2019	3	Minnesota State	CCHA	25–12–1	Tournament champion	9th	2022
4	Merrimack	Hockey East	23–13–1	At-large bid	3rd	2011	4	Canisius	AHA	21–10–3	Tournament champion	2nd	2013

Number in parentheses denotes overall seed in the tournament.

== Bracket ==
Regional Semifinals; March 23–24
1	Minnesota (1)	9
4	Canisius	2
West – Fargo – Thu/Sat
2	St. Cloud State	4
3	Minnesota State	0
1	Denver (4)	0
4	Cornell	2
East – Manchester – Thu/Sat
2	Boston University	5
3	Western Michigan	1
1	Michigan (3)	11
4	Colgate	1
Midwest – Allentown – Fri/Sun
2	Penn State	8
3	Michigan Tech	0
1	Quinnipiac (2)	5
4	Merrimack	0
Northeast – Bridgeport – Fri/Sun
2	Harvard	1
3	Ohio State	8

Regional Finals; March 25–26
1	Minnesota (1)	4
2	St. Cloud State	1
4	Cornell	1
2	Boston University	2
1	Michigan (3)	2*
2	Penn State	1
1	Quinnipiac (2)	4
3	Ohio State	1

National Semifinals; Thursday, April 6
W1	Minnesota (1)	6
E2	Boston University	2
MW1	Michigan (3)	2
NE1	Quinnipiac (2)	5

National Championship; Saturday, April 8
W1	Minnesota (1)	2
NE1	Quinnipiac (2)	3*

* denotes overtime period

== Results ==
Note: All game times are local.

=== West Region – Fargo, North Dakota ===
==== Regional semifinals ====
March 23, 2023; 8:00 PM	(1) Minnesota	9 – 2 (1–1, 2–1, 6–0)	(4) Canisius	Scheels Arena; Attendance: 5,061

Game reference

Justen Close
Goalies
Jacob Barczewski
Referees:
Bruce Vida Jr.
Timothy Likens
Linesmen:
Matt Tyree
Eric Standke

(Koster, Brodzinski) Luke Mittelstadt (3) – PP – 06:08	1–0
	1–1	08:41 – Daniel DiGrande (12) (Decker, Bowman)
	1–2	23:23 – Nick Bowman (11) (Lambert)
(Lamb, Pitlick) Aaron Huglen (7) – 28:15	2–2
(Koster, Pitlick) Connor Kurth (7) – 38:04	3–2
(Nelson, Cooley) Jimmy Snuggerud (21) – PP – 41:10	4–2
(Faber, Kurth) Brody Lamb (4) – PP – 42:35	5–2
(Cooley, Faber) Bryce Brodzinski (16) – 50:03	6–2
(Cooley, LaCombe) Mason Nevers (10) – PP – 52:28	7–2
(J. Mittelstadt) Bryce Brodzinski (17) – 52:50	8–2
(unassisted) Bryce Brodzinski (18) – 59:05	9–2

8 min
Penalties
19 min
34
Shots
20

Game summary
The game started slow, with each team feeling the other out over the first 4 minutes. Knowing they could ill afford mistakes against the high-powered Gophers, Canisius put themselves in trouble early when Markus Boguslavsky took a boarding penalty. While the Griffins got a scoring opportunity during the kill, Minnesota engineered the game's first goal when Luke Mittelstadt threw a bad-angle shot at Jacob Barczewski and it deflected into the net. After the ensuing faceoff, Minnesota's Connor Kurth took a hooking penalty and gave Canisius a chance to tie the score. Minnesota held the Golden Griffins back for the man-advantage but, just after the penalty expired, Daniel DiGrande slapped the puck through the legs of Justen Close from the circle. Minnesota controlled the play over an extended stretch but Barczewski and the defense were able to keep the puck out of the net. John Mittelstadt took a kneeing penalty in the latter part of the period, giving the Griffins power play a second chance but sloppy play resulted in a wasted opportunity. Just before the end of the period, Luke Mittelstadt fired a one-timer from the blueline but Barczewski flashed the leather and gloved the puck.

Minnesota kept the puck in the Canisius end for most of the early part of the second, however, Matthew Vermaeten found himself alone in the slot. While his shot was stopped, Canisius began to fight back afterwards and went on the attack. Nick Bowman got the puck in the right circle, stickhandled through Colin Schmidt and then fired the puck through Close's 6-hole. The Gophers resumed their assault, getting several good looks at the cage and were finally able to get the equalizer from the high slot in spite of Barczewski's stellar play. However, after scoring the goal, Aaron Huglen took a tripping call behind the Canisius net and gave the Griffins their third consecutive man-advantage. Both teams had scoring chances on the Canisius power play but the score remained unchanged. Minnesota increased the pressure as the period wore on and, with just a couple minutes remaining, Connor Kurth fired the puck through Barczewski's legs off of a Mike Koster pass from behind the goal line.

At the start of the third period, Stefano Bottini hit Jackson LaCombe in the corner and received a match penalty. While his night was over, the rest of the Griffins had to kill off a major penalty. Jimmy Snuggerud scored before a minute of power play time had expired and the route was on. By the time the penalty expired, Canisius had less than 15 minutes left to score 3 goals or their season would be over. Pressing for a goal, the Griffins allowed Minnesota to get a 3-on-1 rush and Bryce Brodzinski scored what appeared to be Minnesota's 6th goal. However, video review showed that the puck had hit both posts but never crossed the line. The reprieve was short-lived as Brodzinski was able to get Minnesota's 6th a few minutes later. A third Canisius penalty resulted in yet another Minnesota goal and effectively ended the game. Two more Gopher goals didn't chance the complexion of the game as Canisius couldn't overcome Minnesota's superior special teams play.

March 23, 2023; 4:00 PM	(2) St. Cloud State	4 – 0 (0–0, 2–0, 2–0)	(3) Minnesota State	Scheels Arena; Attendance: 5,061

Game reference

Jaxon Castor
Goalies
Keenan Rancier
Referees:
Cameron Lynch
Chris Pitoscia
Linesmen:
Adam Wood
Stephen Drain

(Cruikshank, Ingram) Veeti Miettinen (12) – PP GW – 32:30	1–0
(Rogers, Ahcan) Jack Peart (3) – 37:23	2–0
(Spellacy, Miettinen) Zach Okabe (18) – 53:03	3–0
(Miller) Grant Cruikshank (23) – EN – 56:44	4–0

8 min
Penalties
6 min
21
Shots
34

==== Regional final ====
March 25, 2023; 6:30 PM	(1) Minnesota	4 – 1 (1–0, 1–1, 2–0)	(2) St. Cloud State	Scheels Arena; Attendance: 5,326

Game reference

Justen Close
Goalies
Jaxon Castor
Referees:
Jeremy Tufts
Steven Rouillard
Linesmen:
Kevin Briganti
Bill Kingdon

(Nelson, Nevers) Bryce Brodzinski (19) – 06:40	1–0
	1–1	23:07 – Adam Ingram (8) (Wylie, Cruikshank)
(LaCombe) Logan Cooley (3) – GW – 25:57	2–1
(Cooley) Jackson LaCombe (9) – 51:44	3–1
(unassisted) Jaxon Nelson (9) – EN – 59:29	4–1

10 min
Penalties
6 min
30
Shots
28

=== Northeast Region – Bridgeport, Connecticut ===
==== Regional semifinals ====
March 24, 2023; 5:30 PM	(1) Quinnipiac	5 – 0 (0–0, 2–0, 3–0)	(4) Merrimack	Total Mortgage Arena; Attendance: 4,462

Game reference

Yaniv Perets
Goalies
Zachary Borgiel
Referees:
Ryan Hersey
Joe Sullivan
Linesmen:
John Grandt
Tyler Liffrig

(Lee, McGee) Joey Cipollone (7) – GW – 21:56	1–0
(Lipkin, Graf) Jacob Quillan (15) – 23:29	2–0
(Metsa, Friedmann) Michael Lombardi (5) – 46:28	3–0
(Lipkin) Jacob Quillan (16) – 54:41	4–0
(de Jong, Johnson) Sam Lipkin (13) – EN – 58:31	5–0

4 min
Penalties
6 min
35
Shots
15

March 24, 2023; 2:00 PM	(2) Harvard	1 – 8 (0–2, 0–5, 1–1)	(3) Ohio State	Total Mortgage Arena; Attendance: 4,462

Game reference

(out 40:00, in 53:50) Mitchell Gibson
(in 40:00, out 53:50) Derek Mullahy
Goalies
Jakub Dobeš
Referees:
Dan Dreger
Nathan Wieler
Linesmen:
Justin Hills
Erik Contino

	0–1	03:22 – Cam Thiesing (14) (Westlund, Wise)
	0–2	18:24 – GW – Cole McWard (8) (Lohrei, Thiesing)
	0–3	23:44 – Gustaf Westlund (2) (Wise)
	0–4	23:50 – Cam Thiesing (15) (Westlund)
	0–5	28:24 – Mason Lohrei (4) (Halliday, Burnside)
	0–6	35:08 – Joe Dunlap (12) (Guzzo, Lohrei)
	0–7	36:59 – PP – Cole McWard (9) (Wise)
	0–8	41:10 – Patrick Guzzo (9) (Dunlap, Gildon)
(Farrell, Moore) John Farinacci (5) – PP – 56:46	1–8

12 min
Penalties
8 min
22
Shots
40

Game summary
The game began with Harvard on the attack, however, Ohio State quickly turned the tide and Cam Thiesing opened the scoring with a sharp-angle shot over the shoulder of Mitchell Gibson and into the top of the net. Harvard tried to attack the Buckeye cage but the Ohio State defense stopped most of the Harvard rushes before they could get to Jakub Dobeš. A Pair of turnovers in the middle of the period gave Ohio State two excellent chances to increase their lead but luck was on Harvard's side and the puck stayed out of the net. Shortly after, a bad tripping penalty by Ryan Drkulec gave the Buckeyes the first power play of the game. Gibson made several big saved both during and immediately after the penalty to keep the score unchanged. With 8 minutes left in the first, Ohio State was incomplete control of the game, outshooting Harvard 12–2. The Buckeyes continued to press and fired another shot off the post though it bounced back between Gibson's legs and allowed the goalie to freeze the puck. with about 100 seconds left in the first, Cole McWard floated a shot from the blueline the deflected off of John Farinacci skate into the net. The play was reviewed as Thiesing made contact with Gibson around the top of the crease but the goal was allowed to stand. When the buzzer rang the score was in Ohio State's favor but did little to indicate just how dominant the Buckeyes had been. Harvard had gone over 17 minutes without getting a shot and would need a much better effort if they wanted to make this a game.

Harvard was able to get some offense going early in the second when Zakary Karpa got a clean shot at Dobeš but the Czech netminder gloved the puck. After trading odd-man rushes, Gustaf Westlund stole the puck and then finished off a passing play for another Buckeye goal. Off of the ensuing faceoff, Cam Thiesing took advantage of yet another Harvard mishandle and backhanded the puck past a Gibson for a 4–0 Ohio State lead. Harvard finally got their chance on the power play a few minutes later but they were facing the nation top penalty kill. After their chance went for naught, Harvard couldn't keep the Buckeyes back and Ohio State quickly generated a 5th goal off of the skate of Mason Lohrei. Cam Thiesing nearly got his hat-trick when he hit the post behind Gibson but the Buckeyes were still in full command. Harvard was forced to play more aggressively in order to get back into the game and Alex Laferriere ended up taking a minor penalty in the offensive zone. Harvard managed to kill off the disadvantage but Ohio State remained in complete control. Harvard took two more penalties but, more importantly, they allowed two more goals to the Buckeyes and after 40 minutes the game was a run away for Ohio State.

Derek Mullahy was in goal for Harvard at the start of the third but the switch didn't change much as Ohio State got their 8th goal just over a minute in. After that the Buckeyes settled in, knowing that they were going to win the game. The only thing left to decide was whether or not the Buckeyes would record the biggest shutout victory in NCAA history, as the record was 7–0. They somehow managed to keep the puck out of the goal in the middle of the period but, shortly after Gibson was returned to the net for his final game, the puck fluttered over Dobeš' shoulder off of John Farinacci's skate. The lost shoutout was about the only thing that did not go in Ohio State's favor as they advanced with a dominating performance.

==== Regional final ====
March 26, 2023; 4:00 PM	(1) Quinnipiac	4 – 1 (2–1, 0–0, 2–0)	(3) Ohio State	Total Mortgage Arena; Attendance: 4,557

Game reference

Yaniv Perets
Goalies
Jakub Dobeš
Referees:
Ryan Hersey
Joe Sullivan
Linesmen:
John Grandt
Tyler Liffrig

	0–1	01:31 – Joe Dunlap (13) (unassisted)
(Czerneckianair, Tellier) Christophe Fillion (7) – 13:20	1–1
(Burgart, de Jong) Skyler Brind'Amour (14) – GW – 13:35	2–1
(Quillan, Fillion) Cristophe Tellier (7) – PP – 55:30	3–1
(Lipkin) Jayden Lee (4) – EN – 58:03	4–1

8 min
Penalties
8 min
17
Shots
35

=== Midwest Region – Allentown, Pennsylvania ===
==== Regional semifinals ====
March 24, 2023; 8:30 PM	(1) Michigan	11 – 1 (1–0, 7–0, 3–1)	(4) Colgate	PPL Center; Attendance: 7,067

Game reference

Erik Portillo
Goalies
Carter Gylander (out 36:54, in 52:52)
Andrew Takacs (in 36:54, out 52:52)
Referees:
Ryan Sweeney
Brendan Blanchard
Linesmen:
Brendan Lewis
Joe Sherman

(L. Hughes, Moyle) Nick Granowicz (4) – 09:40	1–0
(T. Hughes, Casey) Eric Ciccolini (7) – PP GW – 27:33	2–0
(unassisted) Adam Fantilli (28) – 28:18	3–0
(Hallum, Edwards) Frank Nazar (2) – 31:06	4–0
(L. Hughes, Pehrson) Mark Estapa (5) – 31:36	5–0
(A. Fantilli, Casey) Rutger McGroarty (16) – 32:31	6–0
(T. Hughes, Duke) Gavin Brindley (12) – 35:49	7–0
(unassisted) Luke Hughes (10) – SH – 36:54	8–0
	8–1	43:03 – Nic Belpedio (5) (C. Young)
(Brindley, Nazar) Luke Hughes (11) – PP – 50:17	9–1
(T. Hughes, Casey) Dylan Duke (18) – PP – 50:33	10–1
(L. Hughes, Samoskevich) Rutger McGroarty (16) – PP – 52:52	11–1

6 min
Penalties
19 min
52
Shots
21

Game summary
Michigan got off to a rough start when Adam Fantilli took a slashing penalty less than a minute into the game. Colgate, however, couldn't get anything going on the opportunity. The two teams started hitting after the man-advantage went by the wayside but nothing was called until Ethan Manderville took a tripping minor. The Wolverines were far more impressive with their chance, firing several high-quality shots at the Colgate cage but Carter Gylander was equal to the task. Michigan continued to attack, firing more than a dozen shots on goal before 10 minutes had elapsed. Eventually the barrage was too much for Gylander to handle and Nick Granowicz opened the scoring with a roof shot from just in front of the net. The Raiders responded with an attack of their own and got a couple good looks but couldn't get the puck past Erik Portillo. Michigan held a decided advantage in both shots and scoring chances in the first but Colgate fought hard to keep the score close. The teams began trading odd-man rushes at the end of the first but neither could add another goal before the buzzer.

Colgate came out skating at the start of the second and tried to match Michigan but the Raiders could only get a single shot on goal in the first 4 minutes. A bad pass to the point by Michigan turned into a pair of chances for the Raiders but Portillo kept the puck out of the goal. Continued pressure from Michigan forced a holding penalty by Reid Irwin and Eric Ciccolini made the Raiders pay with a rebound goal. Shortly afterwards, Adam Fantilli skated end-to-end and fired a quick shot through Gylander's legs. Colgate tried to fight back with some pressure in the offensive zone but the Wolverines just bided their time and Frank Nazar whacked another rebound into the goal. After the ensuing faceoff, Michigan got another goal after Luke Hughes shot was deflected through Gylander's legs by Mark Estapa. The Wolverines scored a third goal in less than 100 seconds on a shot from Rutger McGroarty that found the top corner of the net. Don Vaughan called a timeone to try and settle his team down but by then the damage had been done. The game slowed down a bit but Michigan's offense continued to generate chances. After Gavin Brindley scored, Adam Fantilli took his second penalty of the game and gave Colgate a chance to erase their goose egg. Instead, Luke Hughes broke in on a rush fired a puck and had it deflected past Gylander's shoulder by a Raider stick. Vaughan replaced Gylander after the 8th goal but the Wolverines didn't seem to notice. Andrew Takacs was forced to make three saves before the end of the period but managed to keep the puck out despite coming into the game having not seen any game action since November.

The Raiders began the third on the power play but Michigan ended up with the better of the chances once more. After the penalty expired, Colgate finally got on the board when Nic Belpedio fired a laser from the blueline. After the goal Colgate kept trying to score but Michigan was content with just playing out the string. Near the middle of the period, Mackie Samoskevich received a butt end from Alex Young and the Colgate forward received a match penalty. Angered by the penalty, Michigan went back on the attack and quickly got a pair of goals to punish the Raiders. Gylander, in his final collegiate game, was put back into the net after a third Michigan power play goal and stopped the bleeding. Up by double-digits, Michigan halted their assault after the major penalty expired and allowed the rest of the time on the clock to tick away.

March 24, 2023; 5:00 PM	(2) Penn State	8 – 0 (1–0, 3–0, 4–0)	(3) Michigan Tech	PPL Center; Attendance: 7,067

Game reference

Liam Soulière
Goalies
Blake Pietila
Referees:
CJ Hanafin
Joe Carusone
Linesmen:
Ryan Knapp
Patrick Dapuzzo

(Crespo, Dowd) Tyler Paquette (7) – GW – 02:12	1–0
(Schade) Jarod Crespo (3) – 24:34	2–0
(Mack, Linden) Ashton Calder (10) – 34:46	3–0
(Kirwan, Sarlo) Christian Berger (5) – 38:45	4–0
(MacEachern, Schade) Kevin Wall (17) – 43:01	5–0
(unassisted) Chase McLane (2) – 47:31	6–0
(MacEachern, DeNaples) Connor McMenamin (9) – 54:20	7–0
(Wall) Ryan Kirwan (8) – 54:53	8–0

4 min
Penalties
2 min
39
Shots
24

Game summary
Both teams shot out of the gate, skating fast from the start of the game. Tyler Paquette opened the scoring after just two minutes with a wraparound goal, which allowed Penn State to settle in. Michigan Tech tried to equal the score but they were unable to establish any offensive zone time over the first 10 minutes. Around the midway point of the first, Tyler Gratton took a hooking penalty, giving one of the nation's worst power plays a chance to score. Penn State ended up getting more shots on the disadvantage than Tech (1–0) but the opportunity seemed to wake up the Huskies and Kyle Kukkonen broke in with a partial breakaway after the penalty expired. Kukkonen got in on a full break with about 4 minutes left in the first by Liam Soulière's glove kept MTU scoreless. The Nittany Lions had several chances to increase their lead but luck remained with the Huskies and the puck stayed out of the net.

The play was more even at the start of the second. The teams traded opportunities early and then played a quiet stretch until Jarod Crespo used Chris Lipe as a screen to fire the puck over Blake Pietila left shoulder for the second goal. Tech upped its offensive game afterwards and got some shots on Soulière but Penn State counterattacked. Near the middle of the period, Michigan Tech turned the puck over in front of their own net but somehow stopped the Nittany Lions from netting a third marker. The near miss seemed to spur the Huskies and Tech was finally able to string a couple of chances together. MTU got several high-quality shots on the Penn State cage but Soulière still refused to let anything get past him. Penn State managed to get two players behind the Tech defense at about the 5-minute mark and Ashton Calder deked the puck past a sprawled-out Pietila for goal #3. Penn State's defense continued to stifle Tech and a quick pass ahead led to a 2-on-1 with about a minute left in the second. Christian Berger finished off the play with another goal for the Nittany Lions' and PSU entered the third with a near-insurmountable lead.

Both teams were skating early in the third and around the 3-minute mark, Pietila stopped two PSU scoring opportunities. However, on the ensuing faceoff, the Nittany Lions won the draw and fired a shot far-side into the net. With Tech's lack of offense in general, the Huskies had little chance at overcoming the deficit but that didn't stop Tech from trying to break through. Unforunately for Michigan Tech, Chase McLane fired a puck from the goal line on the wall that somehow had a perfect angle and went into the top corner of the net. Penn State added a pair of 4-on-4 goal several minutes later and the Nittany Lions gave the Big Ten its third overpowering victory of the first round.

Penn State set a new record by winning the largest shutout victory in NCAA tournament history, surpassing the previous record of 7–0 by St. Lawrence in 1988.

==== Regional final ====
March 26, 2023; 6:30 PM	(1) Michigan	2 – 1 (OT) (0–0, 0–1, 1–0, 1–0)	(2) Penn State	PPL Center; Attendance: 8,375

Game reference

Erik Portillo
Goalies
Liam Soulière
Referees:
Geoff Miller
Scott Hansen
Linesmen:
Jeff McCorkle
Kyle Richetell

	0–1	38:58 – Connor MacEachern (12) (Berger, DeNaples)
(McGroarty, Samoskevich) Adam Fantilli (29) – PP – 52:08	1–1
(Duke, Casey) Mackie Samoskevich (20) – GW – 60:52	2–1

2 min
Penalties
8 min
43
Shots
32

=== East Region – Manchester, New Hampshire ===
==== Regional semifinals ====
March 23, 2023; 5:30 PM	(1) Denver	0 – 2 (0–2, 0–0, 0–0)	(4) Cornell	SNHU Arena; Attendance: 3,631

Game reference
Magnus Chrona	Goalies	Ian Shane	Referees: Andrew Bruggerman; Sean Fernandez; Linesmen: Tommy George; Jake Davis
0–1 / 02:49 – GW – Jack O'Leary (6) (Andreev, Stienburg); 0–2 / 11:28 – Ben Berard (11) (O'Leary)			Referees: Andrew Bruggerman; Sean Fernandez; Linesmen: Tommy George; Jake Davis
11 min	Penalties	7 min	Referees: Andrew Bruggerman; Sean Fernandez; Linesmen: Tommy George; Jake Davis
27	Shots	27	Referees: Andrew Bruggerman; Sean Fernandez; Linesmen: Tommy George; Jake Davis

March 23, 2023; 2:00 PM	(2) Boston University	5 – 1 (1–0, 3–1, 1–0)	(3) Western Michigan	SNHU Arena; Attendance: 3,631

Game reference

Drew Commesso
Goalies
Cameron Rowe
Referees:
Scott Roth
Mike Forys
Linesmen:
Nathan Voll
Tyler Landman

(O'Brien, Phillips) Lane Hutson (15) – 15:24	1–0
(Fensore) Quinn Hutson (15) – GW – 28:53	2–0
(Phillips) Matt Brown (16) – 30:20	3–0
	3–1	32:24 – Jason Polin (30) (McAllister, Washe)
(Wilmer) Wilmer Skoog (15) – 37:16	4–1
(unassisted) Ethan Phillips (3) – EN – 57:34	5–1

8 min
Penalties
8 min
28
Shots
25

Game summary
Early on, BU carried the balance of the play and kept the puck in Western's end. However, near the midway point of the period, the nation's leading scorer, Jason Polin for himself alone near the side of the net with a half-open cage. Drew Commesso slid over and caught the bad-angle shot. After the ensuing faceoff, the Broncos got an odd-man rush and knocked the puck into the BU cage. The play was reviewed the goal was eventually waved off as Hugh Larkin crashed the crease and bumped into Commesso. Despite the setback, the game began to tilt towards Western and the Broncos got their chance to control the game. WMU's Max Sasson got on a partial break with about 6 minutes to play and beat Commesso but hit the post and the game remained scoreless. After the near-miss, BU recaptured the momentum and got the puck back into Western's end. After Ethan Phillips dug the puck out the corner, Jay O'Brien found Lane Hutson alone in the slot and the freshman defenseman fired the puck past Cameron Rowe for the opening score. Play evened out for the remainder of the period and both goalies combined to make several more saves. Just before the end of the first, the initial penalties were called, however, because they were coincidental minors they did not result in a power play.

The game settled down a bit in the second and the two teams started counterpunching. BU got a great chance near the middle of the period when the puck got to Jamie Armstrong in front of the goal but Rowe was able to stop the quick shot. WMU got a chance to score with another rush after the ensuing faceoff but Chad Hillebrand missed the net with his shot. Shortly thereafter, BU got a 3-on-1 after a hit from Luke Tuch jarred the puck free and Domenick Fensore found the stick of a streaking Quinn Hutson for the second marker. With the Terriers on the attack, Rowe stopped a partial break from Matt Brown but the rubber stayed with BU and Brown fired a one-timer off the post and into the net for a 3–0 lead. Boston University's assault continued but Rowe stood strong, stopping several more chances. After Brown missed a half-open cage, the Broncos were finally able to get a goal of their own when Polin deflected a Ryan McAllister shot past Commesso. With chances coming fast and furious, both teams were looking for the next goal. BU ended up getting their 4th when Wilmer Skoog got the puck at the faceoff dot. He was so open that he had time to measure up the WMU cage and fire the puck past Rowe. On the ensuing faceoff, Quinn Hutson took a tripping penalty and gave the Broncos the first power play of the game. Unable to score on the man-advantage, Western Michigan ended the period down by 3 and needed a dramatic reversal to save their season.

Western began the third searching for a goal and about a minute in Luke Grainger fired the puck on goal. Commesso stopped the shot, however, the puck bounced loose to the goalie's right. Because his body blocked out the sight of the puck, the referee blew the whistle. Simultaneously with the stoppage, Grainger went after the puck and ended up running over Commesso. He received a penalty for the play and gave BU their first power play. After accomplishing very little over the first minute, Aidan Fulp slashed the stick out of Brown's hand and gave the Terriers a 5-on-3 for 54 seconds. WMU held firm and didn't give the Terriers much to shoot at, killing off both penalties. During a 4-on-4 in the middle of the frame, Sasson was nearly able to cut into the lead with a wrap-around attempt but Commesso was equal to the task. WMU continued to press towards the BU cage but the Terriers were mostly contest to play defense with a 3-goal advantage. A second power play for Western resulted in several chances but no goals for the Broncos. As time ticked away, Western became increasingly desperate and were forced to pull Rowe with about four and half minutes remaining. Nothing they tried worked, however, and Ethan Phillips was able to salt away the game with an empty-net goal.

==== Regional final ====
March 25, 2023; 4:00 PM	(2) Boston University	2 – 1 (0–0, 1–0, 1–1)	(4) Cornell	SNHU Arena; Attendance: 7,143

Game reference

Drew Commesso
Goalies
Ian Shane
Referees:
Colin Kronforst
Jonathon Sitarski
Linesmen:
Pat Richardson
Sam Shikowsky

(Wilmer) Wilmer Skoog (16) – 22:13	1–0
(Brown) Ethan Phillips (4) – GW – 47:26	2–0
	2–1	59:32 – Dalton Bancroft (9) (Mitchell, Seger)

6 min
Penalties
6 min
21
Shots
14

=== Frozen Four – Tampa, Florida ===
==== National semifinal ====
April 6, 2023; 5:00 PM	(W1) Minnesota	6–2 (2–1, 0–1, 4–0)	(E2) Boston University	Amalie Arena; Attendance: 19,119

Game reference

Justen Close
Goalies
Drew Commesso
Referees:
Cameron Lynch
Chris Pitoscia
Linesmen:
Ryan Knapp
Stepen Drain

	0–1	10:38 – Sam Stevens (Fensore, Armstrong)
(Cooley, Nelson) Mike Koster PP – 15:09	1–1
(Huglen) Rhett Pitlick – PP – 15:59	2–1
	2–2	28:06 – PP – Jay O'Brien (Fensore, Brown)
(Koster, Brodzinski) Luke Mittelstadt – PP, GW – 41:40	3–2
(Chesley, Huglen) Luke Mittelstadt – 43:29	4–2
(unassisted) Logan Cooley – EN – 57:19	5–2
(Knies, Faber) Logan Cooley – EN – 58:17	6–2

6 min
Penalties
14 min
34
Shots
31

April 6, 2023; 8:30 PM	(NE1) Quinnipiac	5–2 (2–1, 0–1, 3–0)	(MW1) Michigan	Amalie Arena; Attendance: 19,119

Game reference

Yaniv Perets
Goalies
Erik Portillo
Referees:
Jeremy Tufts
Steven Rouillard
Linesmen:
Bill Kingdon
Kevin Briganti

(Lee, Tellier) Jacob Quillan – 5:18	1–0
	1–1	6:49 – Seamus Casey (unassisted)
(Lipkin, Graf) Jacob Quillan – 11:21	2–1
	2–2	30:15 – Adam Fantilli (Hughes, McGroarty)
(Graf, Quillan) Sam Lipkin – GW – 41:24	3–2
(Fillion, Tellier) Zach Metsa – 53:00	4–2
(unassisted) Ethan de Jong – EN – 58:15	5–2

6 min
Penalties
6 min
30
Shots
31

==== National Championship ====
April 8, 2023; 8:00 PM	(W1) Minnesota	2–3 (OT) (1–0, 1–1, 0–1, 0–1)	(NE1) Quinnipiac	Amalie Arena; Attendance: 19,444

Game reference
Referees: Joe Sullivan; Ryan Hersey; Linesmen: John Grandt; Tyler Liffrig

Scoring summary
Period	Team	Goal	Assist(s)	Time	Score
1st	MIN	John Mittelstadt (4)	Kurth	05:35	1–0 MIN
2nd	MIN	Jaxon Nelson (10)	Faber	25:24	2–0 MIN
2nd	QU	Cristophe Tellier (8)	Metsa	27:41	2–1 MIN
3rd	QU	Collin Graf (21) – EA	Metsa, Lipkin	57:13	2–2
1st Overtime	QU	Jacob Quillan (19) – GW	Lipkin, Metsa	60:10	3–2 QU
Penalty summary
Period	Team	Player	Penalty	Time	PIM
1st	QU	Skyler Brind'Amour	Head contact	00:21	2:00
2nd	MIN	Jimmy Snuggerud	Tripping	32:32	2:00
3rd	QU	Skyler Brind'Amour	Hooking	43:17	2:00
3rd	MIN	Logan Cooley	High-sticking	55:08	2:00

Shots by period
Team	1	2	3	OT	T
Quinnipiac	4	11	14	1	30
Minnesota	7	6	2	0	15

Goaltenders
Team	Name	Saves	Goals against	Time on ice
QU	Yaniv Perets	13	2	59:29
MIN	Justen Close	27	3	60:10

== Tournament awards ==
=== All-Tournament team ===
- G: Yaniv Perets (Quinnipiac)
- D: Zach Metsa (Quinnipiac)
- D: Luke Mittelstadt (Minnesota)
- F: Logan Cooley (Minnesota)
- F: Collin Graf (Quinnipiac)
- F: Jacob Quillan* (Quinnipiac)

* Most Outstanding Player

== Record by conference ==
Conference	Bids	Record	Win %	Regional Finals	Frozen Four	Championship Game	National Champions
ECAC	4	5–3	.625	2	1	1	1
Big Ten	4	7–4	.636	4	2	1	–
Hockey East	2	2–2	.500	1	1	—	—
NCHC	3	1–3	.250	1	–	–	–
CCHA	2	0–2	.000	–	–	–	–
Atlantic Hockey	1	0–1	.000	–	–	–	–

== Media ==
=== Television ===
ESPN had US television rights to all games during the tournament for the eighteenth consecutive year. ESPN aired every game, beginning with the regionals, on ESPN2, ESPNews, or ESPNU. Additionally all matches were streamed online via the ESPN app.

==== Broadcast assignments ====
Regionals

- East Regional: Drew Carter and Paul Caponigri – Manchester, New Hampshire
- West Regional: Roxy Bernstein and Ben Clymer – Fargo, North Dakota
- Northeast Regional: John Buccigross and Colby Cohen – Bridgeport, Connecticut
- Midwest Regional: Clay Matvick and Sean Ritchlin – Allentown, Pennsylvania

Frozen Four

- John Buccigross, Barry Melrose, Colby Cohen, and Victoria Arlen – Tampa, Florida

=== Radio ===
Westwood One has exclusive radio rights to the Frozen Four and will broadcast both the semifinals and the championship.

- Brian Tripp, Dave Starman, and Shireen Saski
