= 2022–23 NCAA Division I men's ice hockey season =

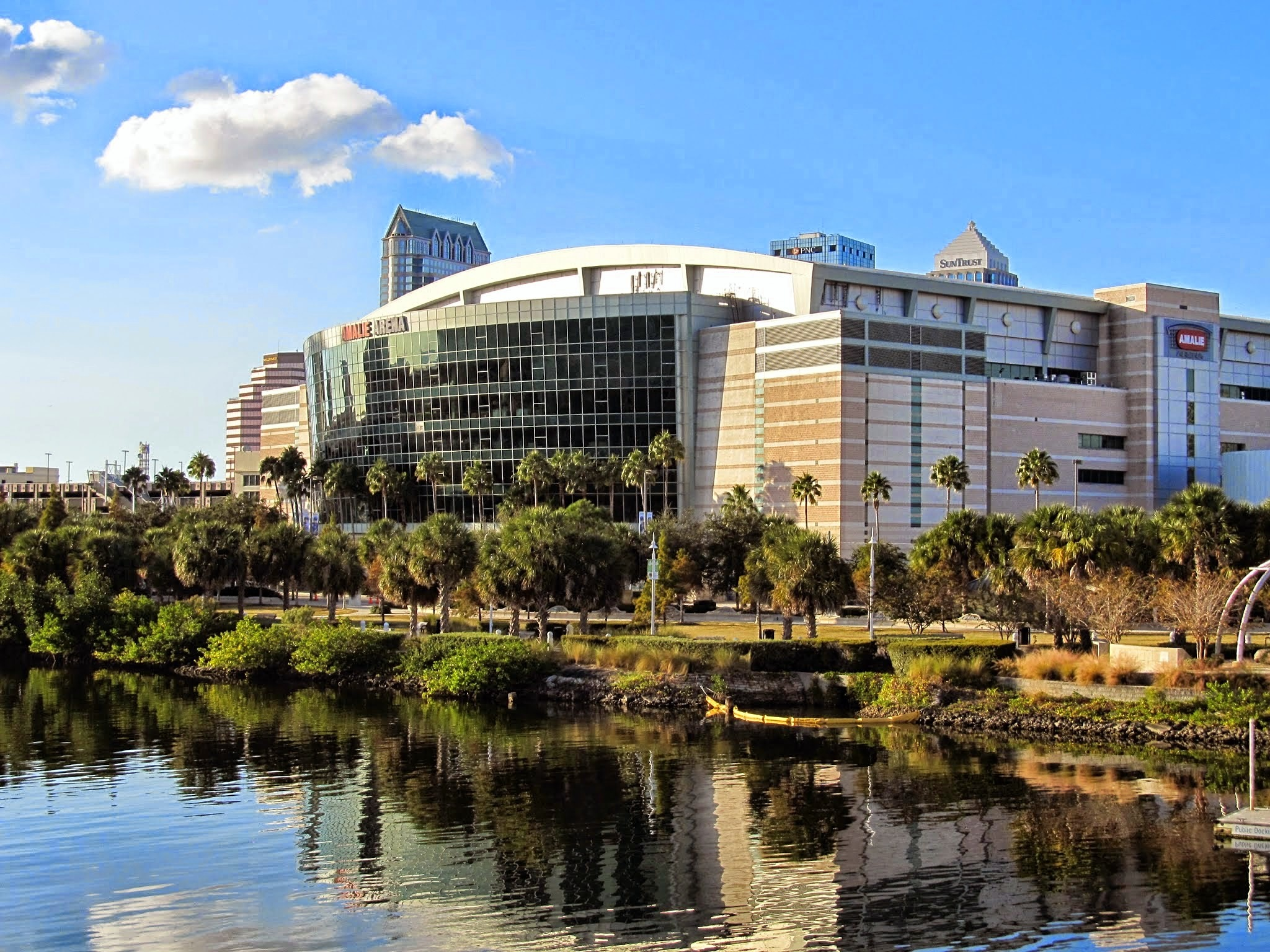
- Amalie Arena in Tampa, Florida hosted the 2023 Frozen Four
- Duration: October 1, 2022– April 8, 2023
- NCAA tournament: 2023
- National championship: Amalie Arena; Tampa, Florida
- NCAA champion: Quinnipiac
- Hobey Baker Award: Adam Fantilli (Michigan)

The 2022–23 NCAA Division I men's ice hockey season began on October 1, 2022, and concluded with the NCAA championship on April 8, 2023. This was the 75th season in which an NCAA ice hockey championship was held, and was US college hockey's 129th year overall.

== Conference realignment ==
On August 31, 2021, Alaska Anchorage announced that the $3 million fundraising goal had been reached and the team would return for the 2022–23 season.

On February 23, Lindenwood University announced that they would be promoting their athletic program to Division I for the 2022–23 academic year. Then on March 17, Lindenwood announced that they would promote their men's ice hockey team from club to Division I, which was confirmed the next day by university president John R. Porter. The formal announcement was made on March 24.

On April 5, Stonehill College announced that they would also promoting their athletic program to Division I for the 2022–23 academic year. Stonehill's hockey program previously competed as a member of the Division II Northeast-10 Conference. For the 2022–23 season, Stonehill's men's team was an Independent with their women's team competing in the NEWHA.

=== Membership changes ===
School	Former Conference	New Conference
Alaska Anchorage Seawolves	Program Resumed	Independent
Lindenwood Lions	CSCHL (ACHA DI)	Independent
Stonehill Skyhawks	Northeast-10 (DII) (Note: The Northeast-10 is the only Division II conference that sponsors ice hockey.)	Independent

== Regular season ==
=== Season tournaments ===
Tournament	Dates	Teams	Champion
Ice Breaker Tournament	October 7–8	4	Denver
Friendship Four	November 25–26	4	Quinnipiac
Great Lakes Invitational	December 27–28	4	Western Michigan
Holiday Face–Off	December 28–29	4	Clarkson
Ledyard Bank Classic	December 30–31	4	Providence
Desert Hockey Classic	January 6–7	4	Michigan Tech
Connecticut Ice	January 27–28	4	Quinnipiac
Beanpot	February 6, 13	4	Northeastern

=== Standings ===
2022–23 Atlantic Hockey Standings
	Conference record										Overall record					
	GP	W	L	T	OW	OL	SW	PTS	GF	GA	GP	W	L	T	GF	GA
RIT †	26	18	7	1	1	3	0	57	85	55	39	25	13	1	127	100
American International	26	14	8	4	2	0	3	47	87	62	39	18	14	7	124	98
Sacred Heart	26	14	9	3	2	0	2	45	87	72	37	17	17	3	107	112
Canisius *	26	13	10	3	3	1	1	41	76	71	42	20	19	3	118	119
Army	26	12	12	2	3	3	1	39	72	81	37	14	19	4	98	119
Niagara	26	10	13	3	0	3	2	38	73	86	40	19	18	3	119	129
Holy Cross	26	12	12	2	3	1	1	37	73	71	41	17	21	3	98	119
Mercyhurst	26	9	14	3	1	5	1	35	77	80	36	10	23	3	98	122
Bentley	26	8	16	2	1	1	1	27	61	89	34	11	21	2	81	124
Air Force	26	8	17	1	1	0	0	24	63	87	36	12	22	2	95	128
Championship: March 18, 2023 † indicates conference regular season champion (DeGregorio Trophy) * indicates conference tournament champion (Riley Trophy); Rankings: USCHO.com Top 20 Poll

2022–23 Big Ten ice hockey Standings
	Conference record										Overall record					
	GP	W	L	T	OTW	OTL	3/SW	PTS	GF	GA	GP	W	L	T	GF	GA
#2 Minnesota †	24	19	4	1	2	1	0	57	106	50	40	29	10	1	168	90
#3 Michigan *	24	12	10	2	3	3	0	38	82	79	41	26	12	3	171	128
#7 Ohio State	24	11	11	2	0	0	1	36	69	63	40	21	16	3	131	101
Notre Dame	24	10	10	4	2	0	3	35	52	60	37	16	16	5	85	97
#19 Michigan State	24	10	12	2	1	1	2	34	65	80	38	18	18	2	107	115
#8 Penn State	24	10	13	1	0	3	0	34	71	75	39	22	16	1	129	106
Wisconsin	24	6	18	0	0	0	0	18	54	92	36	13	23	0	94	126
Championship: March 18, 2023 † indicates conference regular season champion * indicates conference tournament champion Rankings: USCHO.com Top 20 Poll

2022–23 Central Collegiate Hockey Association Standings
	Conference record										Overall record					
	GP	W	L	T	OTW	OTL	SW	PTS	GF	GA	GP	W	L	T	GF	GA
#12 Minnesota State †*	26	16	9	1	2	4	1	52	83	56	39	25	13	1	126	81
#13 Michigan Tech	26	15	7	4	0	1	0	50	68	54	39	24	11	4	103	88
Bowling Green	26	12	12	2	0	2	1	41	89	76	36	15	19	2	114	114
Northern Michigan	26	14	12	0	3	0	0	39	82	77	38	21	17	0	123	103
Bemidji State	26	12	11	3	3	1	2	39	73	63	36	14	17	5	94	97
Ferris State	26	9	14	3	1	2	3	34	62	91	37	14	19	4	92	131
St. Thomas	26	10	14	2	1	1	0	32	69	81	36	11	23	2	86	117
Lake Superior State	26	8	17	1	2	1	1	25	52	80	36	9	25	2	71	118
Championship: March 18, 2023 † indicates conference regular season champion (MacNaughton Cup) * indicates conference tournament champion (Mason Cup); Rankings: USCHO.com Top 20 Poll

2022–23 NCAA Division I Independent ice hockey standings
	Overall record					
	GP	W	L	T	GF	GA
#15 Alaska	34	22	10	2	104	74
Alaska Anchorage	28	8	19	1	66	106
Arizona State	39	18	21	0	115	112
Lindenwood	30	7	22	1	92	134
Long Island	36	13	22	1	116	123
Stonehill	25	17	6	2	102	95
Rankings: USCHO.com Top 20 Poll

2022–23 ECAC Hockey Standings
	Conference record										Overall record					
	GP	W	L	T	OTW	OTL	SW	PTS	GF	GA	GP	W	L	T	GF	GA
#1 Quinnipiac †	22	20	2	0	0	0	0	60	87	30	41	34	4	3	162	64
#10 Harvard	22	18	4	0	5	0	0	49	86	48	34	24	8	2	125	81
#9 Cornell	22	15	6	1	0	1	0	47	78	42	34	21	11	2	112	66
St. Lawrence	22	12	10	0	1	2	0	37	56	58	36	17	19	0	88	102
#18 Colgate *	22	11	8	3	4	1	3	36	71	58	40	19	16	5	113	109
Clarkson	22	9	10	3	0	1	0	31	60	60	37	16	17	4	102	98
Rensselaer	22	9	13	0	2	1	0	26	52	74	35	14	20	1	84	115
Union	22	8	13	1	0	0	1	26	45	68	35	14	19	2	86	117
Princeton	22	8	14	0	2	1	0	26	57	73	32	13	19	0	89	112
Yale	22	6	14	2	0	1	1	22	35	62	32	8	20	4	57	94
Brown	22	5	14	3	0	1	1	20	41	69	30	9	18	3	65	91
Dartmouth	22	4	17	1	0	2	1	16	44	70	30	5	24	1	64	106
Championship: March 18, 2023 † indicates conference regular season champion (Cleary Cup) * indicates conference tournament champion (Whitelaw Cup); Rankings: USCHO.com Top 20 Poll

2022–23 Hockey East Standings
	Conference record										Overall record					
	GP	W	L	T	OTW	OTL	SW	PTS	GF	GA	GP	W	L	T	GF	GA
#4 Boston University †*	24	18	6	0	2	2	0	54	99	62	40	29	11	0	154	106
#14 Merrimack	24	16	8	0	2	4	0	50	72	52	38	23	14	1	106	89
#16 Northeastern	24	14	7	3	0	2	2	49	78	45	35	17	13	5	107	82
Connecticut	24	13	9	2	4	2	2	41	78	71	35	20	12	3	113	96
Massachusetts Lowell	24	11	10	3	2	2	3	39	56	54	36	18	15	3	89	82
Maine	24	9	11	4	1	1	1	32	62	65	36	15	16	5	92	94
Providence	24	9	9	6	3	0	2	32	64	60	37	16	14	7	103	87
Boston College	24	8	11	5	0	0	1	30	70	73	36	14	16	6	104	104
Massachusetts	24	7	14	3	1	3	2	28	55	80	35	13	17	5	94	103
New Hampshire	24	6	15	3	2	2	2	23	44	76	35	11	20	3	74	105
Vermont	24	5	16	3	2	1	1	18	36	76	36	11	20	5	69	103
Championship: March 18, 2023 † indicates regular season champion * indicates conference tournament champion (Lamoriello Trophy); Rankings: USCHO.com Top 20 Poll

2022–23 National Collegiate Hockey Conference Standings
	Conference record										Overall record					
	GP	W	L	T	OTW	OTL	SW	PTS	GF	GA	GP	W	L	T	GF	GA
#6 Denver †	24	19	5	0	2	1	0	56	94	53	40	30	10	0	150	86
#11 Western Michigan	24	15	8	1	2	0	0	44	86	60	39	23	15	1	148	102
#20 Omaha	24	13	9	2	2	2	1	42	71	64	37	19	15	3	109	97
#5 St. Cloud State *	24	12	9	3	2	1	3	41	85	68	41	25	13	3	133	95
Minnesota Duluth	24	10	14	0	1	4	0	33	65	81	37	16	20	1	95	114
#17 North Dakota	24	10	10	4	3	0	2	33	75	70	39	18	15	6	127	110
Colorado College	24	6	15	3	0	2	2	25	37	60	38	13	22	3	79	99
Miami	24	3	18	3	0	2	0	14	39	96	36	8	24	4	73	137
Championship: March 18, 2023 † indicates conference regular season champion (Penrose Cup) * indicates conference tournament champion (Frozen Faceoff Championship Trophy); Rankings: USCHO.com Top 20 Poll

== PairWise Rankings ==
The PairWise Rankings (PWR) are a statistical tool designed to approximate the process by which the NCAA selection committee decides which teams get at-large bids to the 16-team NCAA tournament. Although the NCAA selection committee does not use the PWR as presented by USCHO, the PWR has been accurate in predicting which teams will make the tournament field.

For Division I men, all teams are included in comparisons starting in the 2013–14 season (formerly, only teams with a Ratings Percentage Index of .500 or above, or teams under consideration, were included). The PWR method compares each team with every other such team, with the winner of each “comparison” earning one PWR point. After all comparisons are made, the points are totaled up and rankings listed accordingly.

With 62 Division I men's teams, the greatest number of PWR points any team could earn is 61, winning the comparison with every other team. Meanwhile, a team that lost all of its comparisons would have no PWR points.

Teams are then ranked by PWR point total, with ties broken by the teams’ RPI ratings, which starting in 2013–14 is weighted for home and road games and includes a quality wins bonus (QWB) for beating teams in the top 20 of the RPI (it also is weighted for home and road).

When it comes to comparing teams, the PWR uses three criteria which are combined to make a comparison: RPI, record against common opponents and head-to-head competition. Starting in 2013–14, the comparison of record against teams under consideration was dropped because all teams are now under comparison.

NCAA Division I Men's Hockey PairWise Rankings
Rank	Team	PWR	RPI	Conference
1	Minnesota	60	.6016*	Big Ten
2	Quinnipiac	59	.5888*	ECAC Hockey
3	Michigan	58	.5789*	Big Ten
4	Denver	57	.5789*	NCHC
5	Boston University	56	.5705*	Hockey East
6	St. Cloud State	55	.5632	NCHC
7	Harvard	54	.5615	ECAC Hockey
8	Penn State	52	.5547	Big Ten
8	Ohio State	52	.5515	Big Ten
10	Michigan Tech	50	.5474	CCHA
10	Minnesota State	50	.5461	CCHA
10	Western Michigan	50	.5441	NCHC
13	Cornell	47	.5412	ECAC Hockey
13	Merrimack	47	.5404	Hockey East
15	Alaska	46	.5391	Independent
16	Michigan State	45	.5345	Big Ten
17	Notre Dame	44	.5314	Big Ten
18	Northeastern	42	.5275	Hockey East
18	North Dakota	42	.5248	NCHC
20	Omaha	41	.5259	NCHC
20	Connecticut	41	.5217	Hockey East
22	RIT	39	.5182	Atlantic Hockey
22	Minnesota Duluth	39	.5176	NCHC
24	Providence	37	.5116	Hockey East
25	Colgate	33	.5112	ECAC Hockey
26	Boston College	34	.5108	Hockey East
26	Massachusetts Lowell	34	.5090	Hockey East
26	Northern Michigan	34	.5070	CCHA
29	Massachusetts	32	.4989	Hockey East
29	Maine	32	.4974	Hockey East
31	Colorado College	28	.4948	NCHC
31	Clarkson	28	.4944	ECAC Hockey
31	St. Lawrence	28	.4897	ECAC Hockey
34	Bemidji State	27	.4901	CCHA
35	Niagara	26	.4931	Atlantic Hockey
35	American International	26	.4884	Atlantic Hockey
37	Wisconsin	24	.4883	Big Ten
38	Ferris State	23	.4840	CCHA
39	Bowling Green	22	.4855	CCHA
39	Arizona State	22	.4822	Independent
41	Canisius	20	.4788	Atlantic Hockey
42	Sacred Heart	19	.4784	Atlantic Hockey
43	Union	18	.4767	ECAC Hockey
44	Princeton	17	.4734	ECAC Hockey
45	Miami	16	.4662	NCHC
47	Holy Cross	14	.4722	Atlantic Hockey
47	Vermont	14	.4660	Hockey East
47	Brown	14	.4651	ECAC Hockey
49	St. Thomas	12	.4645	CCHA
50	New Hampshire	11	.4641	Hockey East
51	Rensselaer	10	.4545	ECAC Hockey
52	Alaska Anchorage	8	.4533	Independent
52	Army	8	.4526	Atlantic Hockey
54	Yale	6	.4512	ECAC Hockey
54	Mercyhurst	6	.4457	Atlantic Hockey
54	Bentley	6	.4444	Atlantic Hockey
57	Lake Superior State	4	.4427	CCHA
57	Air Force	4	.4370	Atlantic Hockey
59	Long Island	2	.4357	Independent
60	Lindenwood	1	.4263	Independent
60	Dartmouth	1	.4246	ECAC Hockey
*A team's RPI has been adjusted to remove negative effect from defeating a weak opponent Note: A team's record is based only on games against other Division I hockey schools which are eligible for the NCAA Tournament. Note: On February 1, the NCAA selection committee removed all Stonehill games from tournament consideration. Final Rankings

== Tournament bracket ==
Regional Semifinals; March 23–24
1	Minnesota (1)	9
4	Canisius	2
West – Fargo – Thu/Sat
2	St. Cloud State	4
3	Minnesota State	0
1	Denver (4)	0
4	Cornell	2
East – Manchester – Thu/Sat
2	Boston University	5
3	Western Michigan	1
1	Michigan (3)	11
4	Colgate	1
Midwest – Allentown – Fri/Sun
2	Penn State	8
3	Michigan Tech	0
1	Quinnipiac (2)	5
4	Merrimack	0
Northeast – Bridgeport – Fri/Sun
2	Harvard	1
3	Ohio State	8

Regional Finals; March 25–26
1	Minnesota (1)	4
2	St. Cloud State	1
4	Cornell	1
2	Boston University	2
1	Michigan (3)	2*
2	Penn State	1
1	Quinnipiac (2)	4
3	Ohio State	1

National Semifinals; Thursday, April 6
W1	Minnesota (1)	6
E2	Boston University	2
MW1	Michigan (3)	2
NE1	Quinnipiac (2)	5

National Championship; Saturday, April 8
W1	Minnesota (1)	2
NE1	Quinnipiac (2)	3*

* denotes overtime period

== Player stats ==
=== Scoring leaders ===
Player	Class	Team	GP	G	A	Pts	PIM
Adam Fantilli	Freshman	Michigan	36	30	35	65	67
Logan Cooley	Freshman	Minnesota	39	22	38	60	42
Collin Graf	Sophomore	Quinnipiac	41	21	38	59	4
Sean Farrell	Junior	Harvard	34	20	33	53	12
Jimmy Snuggerud	Freshman	Minnesota	40	21	29	50	42
Ryan McAllister	Freshman	Western Michigan	39	13	36	49	14
Lane Hutson	Freshman	Boston University	38	15	33	48	24
Luke Hughes	Sophomore	Michigan	39	10	38	48	26
Jason Polin	Senior	Western Michigan	39	30	17	47	13
Matt Brown	Senior	Boston University	39	16	31	47	6

=== Leading goaltenders ===
The following goaltenders lead the NCAA in goals against average, minimum 1/3 of team's minutes played.
GP = Games played; Min = Minutes played; W = Wins; L = Losses; T = Ties; GA = Goals against; SO = Shutouts; SV% = Save percentage; GAA = Goals against average

Player	Class	Team	GP	Min	W	L	T	GA	SO	SV%	GAA
Yaniv Perets	Sophomore	Quinnipiac	41	2,416:35	34	4	3	60	10	.931	1.49
Ian Shane	Sophomore	Cornell	33	1,852:53	20	10	1	53	5	.916	1.72
Keenan Rancier	Sophomore	Minnesota State	30	1,777:39	19	10	1	55	1	.914	1.86
Jaxon Castor	Senior	St. Cloud State	23	1,368:03	14	8	1	46	4	.924	2.02
Justen Close	Senior	Minnesota	37	2,170:24	26	10	1	73	6	.927	2.02
Gustavs Dāvis Grigals	Graduate	Massachusetts Lowell	24	1,406:28	12	9	2	48	2	.924	2.05
Matt Radomsky	Senior	Alaska	34	1,993:27	22	10	2	68	2	.916	2.05
Zachary Borgiel	Junior	Merrimack	20	1,156:00	13	5	1	40	1	.919	2.08
Blake Pietila	Senior	Michigan Tech	37	2,173:57	23	11	3	78	10	.924	2.15
Philip Svedebäck	Freshman	Providence	34	2,013:08	14	11	7	73	1	.909	2.18

== Awards ==
=== NCAA ===
Award		Recipient
Hobey Baker Award		Adam Fantilli, Michigan
Spencer Penrose Award		Bob Motzko, Minnesota
Tim Taylor Award		Adam Fantilli, Michigan
Mike Richter Award		Devon Levi, Northeastern
Derek Hines Unsung Hero Award		Noah Wilson, Army
Tournament Most Outstanding Player		Jacob Quillan, Quinnipiac
AHCA All-American Teams
East First Team	Position	West First Team
Devon Levi, Northeastern	G	Blake Pietila, Michigan Tech
Lane Hutson, Boston University	D	Brock Faber, Minnesota
Henry Thrun, Harvard	D	Luke Hughes, Michigan
Sean Farrell, Harvard	F	Logan Cooley, Minnesota
Collin Graf, Quinnipiac	F	Adam Fantilli, Michigan
Aidan McDonough, Northeastern	F	Matthew Knies, Minnesota
East Second Team	Position	West Second Team
Yaniv Perets, Quinnipiac	G	Ryan Bischel, Notre Dame
Sam Malinski, Cornell	D	Michael Benning, Denver
Zach Metsa, Quinnipiac	D	Jake Livingstone, Minnesota State
Matt Brown, Boston University	F	Carter Mazur, Denver
Matthew Coronato, Harvard	F	Jason Polin, Western Michigan
Alex Jefferies, Merrimack	F	Massimo Rizzo, Denver

=== Atlantic Hockey ===
Award		Recipient
Player of the Year		Carter Wilkie, RIT
Rookie of the Year		Max Itagaki, Army
Best Defensive Forward		Cody Laskosky, RIT
Best Defenseman		Aiden Hansen-Bukata, RIT
Individual Sportsmanship Award		Braeden Tuck, Sacred Heart
Team Sportsmanship Award		Sacred Heart
Regular Season Scoring Trophy		Eric Esposito, Mercyhurst
Regular Season Goaltending Award		Jarrett Fiske, American International
Coach of the Year		Wayne Wilson, RIT
Tournament MVP		Jacob Barczewski, Canisius
All-Atlantic Hockey Teams
First Team	Position	Second Team
Tommy Scarfone, RIT	G	Jarrett Fiske, American International
Gianfranco Cassaro, RIT	D	Luke Rowe, Air Force
Aiden Hansen-Bukata, RIT	D	Brian Kramer, American International
Carter Wilkie, RIT	F	Jack Ricketts, Holy Cross
Neil Shea, Sacred Heart	F	Eric Esposito, Mercyhurst
Blake Bennett, American International	F	Joey Baez, Army
Third Team	Position	Rookie Team
Jacob Barczewski, Canisius	G	Owen Say, Mercyhurst
Nick Hale, Holy Cross	D	Chris Hedden, Air Force
Hunter Sansbury, Sacred Heart	D	Mack Oliphant, Holy Cross
Keaton Mastrodonato, Canisius	F	Max Itagaki, Army
John Keranen, Army	F	Nicholas Niemo, Bentley
Jordan Biro, American International	F	Marcus Joughin, Sacred Heart

=== Big Ten ===
Award		Recipient
Player of the Year		Matthew Knies, Minnesota
Defensive Player of the Year		Brock Faber, Minnesota
Goaltender of the Year		Ryan Bischel, Notre Dame
Freshman of the Year		Adam Fantilli, Michigan
Scoring Champion		Logan Cooley, Minnesota
Scoring Champion		Jimmy Snuggerud, Minnesota
Coach of the Year		Bob Motzko, Minnesota
Tournament Most Outstanding Player		Adam Fantilli, Michigan
All-Big Ten Teams
First Team	Position	Second Team
Ryan Bischel, Notre Dame	G	Justen Close, Minnesota
Brock Faber, Minnesota	D	Jackson LaCombe, Minnesota
Luke Hughes, Michigan	D	Mason Lohrei, Ohio State
Logan Cooley, Minnesota	F	Mackie Samoskevich, Michigan
Adam Fantilli, Michigan	F	Jimmy Snuggerud, Minnesota
Matthew Knies, Minnesota	F	Jake Wise, Ohio State
Freshman Team	Position	
Seamus Casey, Michigan	D	
Luke Mittelstadt, Minnesota	D	
Logan Cooley, Minnesota	F	
Adam Fantilli, Michigan	F	
Jimmy Snuggerud, Minnesota	F	

=== CCHA ===
Award		Recipient
Player of the Year		Blake Pietila, Michigan Tech
Forward of the Year		David Silye, Minnesota State
Defenseman of the Year		Jake Livingstone, Minnesota State
Goaltender of the Year		Blake Pietila, Michigan Tech
Rookie of the Year		Kyle Kukkonen, Michigan Tech
Coach of the Year		Joe Shawhan, Michigan Tech
All-CCHA Teams
First Team	Position	Second Team
Blake Pietila, Michigan Tech	G	Mattias Sholl, Bemidji State
Jake Livingstone, Minnesota State	D	Akito Hirose, Minnesota State
Elias Rosén, Bemidji State	D	Brett Thorne, Michigan Tech
Ryland Mosley, Michigan Tech	F	Louis Boudon, Lake Superior State
David Silye, Minnesota State	F	Nathan Burke, Bowling Green
Austen Swankler, Bowling Green	F	André Ghantous, Northern Michigan
Rookie Team	Position	
Béni Halász, Northern Michigan	G	
Dalton Norris, Bowling Green	D	
Josh Zinger, Northern Michigan	D	
Kyle Kukkonen, Michigan Tech	F	
Joey Larson, Northern Michigan	F	
Lleyton Roed, Bemidji State	F	

=== ECAC Hockey ===
Award		Recipient
Player of the Year		Sean Farrell, Harvard
Best Defensive Forward		Skyler Brind’Amour, Quinnipiac
Best Defensive Defenseman		Henry Thrun, Harvard
Rookie of the Year		Sam Lipkin, Quinnipiac
Ken Dryden Award		Yaniv Perets, Quinnipiac
Student-Athlete of the Year		Matt Verboon, Colgate
Tim Taylor Award		Rand Pecknold, Quinnipiac
Most Outstanding Player in Tournament		Carter Gylander, Colgate
All-ECAC Hockey Teams
First Team	Position	Second Team
Yaniv Perets, Quinnipiac	G	Mitchell Gibson, Harvard
Henry Thrun, Harvard	D	Zach Metsa, Quinnipiac
Sam Malinski, Cornell	D	Luc Salem, St. Lawrence
Collin Graf, Quinnipiac	F	Matthew Coronato, Harvard
Sean Farrell, Harvard	F	Alex Laferriere, Harvard
Alex Young, Colgate	F	Ethan de Jong, Quinnipiac
Third Team	Position	Rookie Team
Mathieu Caron, Brown	G	Cooper Black, Dartmouth
Noah Beck, Clarkson	D	John Prokop, Union
Tanner Palocsik, Dartmouth	D	Ryan Healey, Harvard
Ayrton Martino, Clarkson	F	Sam Lipkin, Quinnipiac
Mathieu Gosselin, Clarkson	F	Joe Miller, Harvard
Skyler Brind'Amour, Quinnipiac	F	Sutter Muzzatti, Rensselaer

=== Hockey East ===
Award		Recipient
Player of the Year		Devon Levi, Northeastern
Best Defensive Forward		Justin Hryckowian, Northeastern
Best Defensive Defenseman		Hunter McDonald, Northeastern
Rookie of the Year		Lane Hutson, Boston University
Goaltending Champion		Devon Levi, Northeastern
Len Ceglarski Sportmanship Award		Hudson Schandor, Connecticut
Three Stars Award		Lane Hutson, Boston University
Scoring Champion		Lane Hutson, Boston University
Charlie Holt Team Sportsmanship Award		New Hampshire
Bob Kullen Award (Coach of the Year)		Jay Pandolfo, Boston University
William Flynn Tournament Most Valuable Player		Lane Hutson, Boston University
All-Hockey East Teams
First Team	Position	Second Team
Devon Levi, Northeastern	G	Victor Östman, Maine
Domenick Fensore, Boston University	D	Scott Morrow, Massachusetts
Lane Hutson, Boston University	D	Ryan Ufko, Massachusetts
Matt Brown, Boston University	F	Lynden Breen, Maine
Alex Jefferies, Merrimack	F	Justin Hryckowian, Northeastern
Aidan McDonough, Northeastern	F	Ryan Tverberg, Connecticut
Third Team	Position	Rookie Team
Gustavs Dāvis Grigals, Massachusetts Lowell	G	
Hugo Ollas, Merrimack	G	
Max Crozier, Providence	D	Lane Hutson, Boston University
Jon McDonald, Massachusetts Lowell	D	Hunter McDonald, Northeastern
Cutter Gauthier, Boston College	F	Kenny Connors, Massachusetts
Parker Ford, Providence	F	Cutter Gauthier, Boston College
Wilmer Skoog, Boston University	F	Ryan Greene, Boston University
	F	Cam Lund, Northeastern
	F	Matthew Wood, Connecticut

=== NCHC ===
Award		Recipient
Player of the Year		Jason Polin, Western Michigan
Rookie of the Year		Jackson Blake, North Dakota
Goaltender of the Year		Magnus Chrona, Denver
Forward of the Year		Jason Polin, Western Michigan
Defensive Defenseman of the Year		Justin Lee, Denver
Offensive Defenseman of the Year		Michael Benning, Denver
Defensive Forward of the Year		Jami Krannila, St. Cloud State
Scholar-Athlete of the Year		Ethan Frisch, North Dakota
Three Stars Award		Magnus Chrona, Denver
Sportsmanship Award		Spencer Meier, St. Cloud State
Herb Brooks Coach of the Year		Pat Ferschweiler, Western Michigan
Frozen Faceoff MVP		Jami Krannila, St. Cloud State
All-NCHC Teams
First Team	Position	Second Team
Magnus Chrona, Denver	G	Kaidan Mbereko, Colorado College
Michael Benning, Denver	D	Jack Peart, St. Cloud State
Chris Jandric, North Dakota	D	Wyatt Kaiser, Minnesota Duluth
Jason Polin, Western Michigan	F	Carter Mazur, Denver
Massimo Rizzo, Denver	F	Jackson Blake, North Dakota
Jami Krannila, St. Cloud State	F	Riese Gaber, North Dakota
Honorable Mention	Position	Rookie Team
Šimon Latkoczy, Omaha	G	Kaidan Mbereko, Colorado College
Sean Behrens, Denver	D	Joaquim Lemay, Omaha
Dylan Anhorn, St. Cloud State	D	Jacob Guévin, Omaha
Hunter McKown, Colorado College	F	Jackson Blake, North Dakota
Ben Steeves, Minnesota Duluth	F	Ryan McAllister, Western Michigan
Jack Randl, Omaha	F	Ben Steeves, Minnesota Duluth
Ryan McAllister, Western Michigan	F	
Zach Okabe, St. Cloud State	F	

== 2023 NHL entry draft ==
Round	Pick	Player	College	Conference	NHL team
1	3	Adam Fantilli	Michigan	Big Ten	Columbus Blue Jackets
1	4	William Smith ^{†}	Boston College	Hockey East	San Jose Sharks
1	8	Ryan Leonard ^{†}	Boston College	Hockey East	Washington Capitals
1	11	Tom Willander ^{†}	Boston University	Hockey East	Vancouver Canucks
1	15	Matthew Wood	Connecticut	Hockey East	Nashville Predators
1	19	Oliver Moore ^{†}	Minnesota	Big Ten	Chicago Blackhawks
1	21	Charlie Stramel	Wisconsin	Big Ten	Minnesota Wild
1	23	Gabe Perreault ^{†}	Boston College	Hockey East	New York Rangers
1	30	Bradly Nadeau ^{†}	Maine	Hockey East	Carolina Hurricanes
2	34	Gavin Brindley	Michigan	Big Ten	Columbus Blue Jackets
2	35	Adam Gajan ^{†}	Minnesota Duluth	NCHC	Chicago Blackhawks
2	38	Michael Hrabal ^{†}	Massachusetts	Hockey East	Arizona Coyotes
2	41	Trey Augustine ^{†}	Michigan State	Big Ten	Detroit Red Wings
2	45	Maxim Strbak ^{†}	Michigan State	Big Ten	Buffalo Sabres
2	47	Brady Cleveland ^{†}	Wisconsin	Big Ten	Detroit Red Wings
2	49	Danny Nelson ^{†}	Notre Dame	Big Ten	New York Islanders
3	66	William Whitelaw ^{†}	Wisconsin	Big Ten	Columbus Blue Jackets
3	69	Jacob Fowler ^{†}	Boston College	Hockey East	Montreal Canadiens
3	70	Jonathan Castagna ^{†}	Cornell	ECAC Hockey	Arizona Coyotes
3	71	Brandon Svoboda ^{†}	Boston University	Hockey East	San Jose Sharks
3	80	Aydar Suniev ^{†}	Massachusetts	Hockey East	Calgary Flames
3	81	Tanner Ludtke ^{†}	Omaha	NCHC	Arizona Coyotes
3	82	Zach Nehring ^{†}	Western Michigan	NCHC	Winnipeg Jets
3	86	Gavin McCarthy ^{†}	Boston University	Hockey East	Buffalo Sabres
3	90	Drew Fortescue ^{†}	Boston College	Hockey East	New York Rangers
3	92	Christopher Pelosi ^{†}	Quinnipiac	ECAC Hockey	Boston Bruins
3	94	Jayden Perron ^{†}	North Dakota	NCHC	Carolina Hurricanes
4	98	Andrew Strathmann ^{†}	North Dakota	NCHC	Columbus Blue Jackets
4	103	Cole Knuble ^{†}	Notre Dame	Big Ten	Philadelphia Flyers
4	105	Ty Mueller	Omaha	NCHC	Vancouver Canucks
4	108	Hoyt Stanley ^{†}	Cornell	ECAC Hockey	Ottawa Senators
4	115	Jayson Shaugabay ^{†}	Minnesota Duluth	NCHC	Tampa Bay Lightning
4	117	Larry Keenan ^{†}	Massachusetts	Hockey East	Detroit Red Wings
4	118	Hampton Slukynsky ^{†}	Northern Michigan	CCHA	Los Angeles Kings
4	119	Matthew Perkins ^{†}	Minnesota Duluth	NCHC	Vancouver Canucks
4	124	Beckett Hendrickson ^{†}	Minnesota Duluth	NCHC	Boston Bruins
4	125	Aram Minnetian ^{†}	Boston College	Hockey East	Dallas Stars
5	132	Eric Pohlkamp ^{†}	Bemidji State	CCHA	San Jose Sharks
5	133	Sam Harris ^{†}	Denver	NCHC	Montreal Canadiens
5	137	Jack Phelan ^{†}	Wisconsin	Big Ten	Detroit Red Wings
5	138	Paul Fischer ^{†}	Notre Dame	Big Ten	St. Louis Blues
5	139	Charles-Alexis Legault	Quinnipiac	ECAC Hockey	Carolina Hurricanes
5	143	Sutter Muzzatti	Rensselaer	ECAC Hockey	Nashville Predators
5	149	Aaron Pionk ^{†}	Minnesota Duluth	NCHC	Minnesota Wild
5	153	Hudson Malinoski ^{†}	Providence	Hockey East	Toronto Maple Leafs
5	154	Chase Cheslock ^{†}	St. Thomas	CCHA	New Jersey Devils
6	166	Carsen Musser ^{†}	Colorado College	NCHC	Arizona Coyotes
6	169	Rudy Guimond ^{†}	Yale	ECAC Hockey	Detroit Red Wings
6	171	Aiden Celebrini ^{†}	Boston University	Hockey East	Vancouver Canucks
6	172	Ryan MacPherson ^{†}	New Hampshire	Hockey East	Philadelphia Flyers
6	173	Sean Keohane ^{†}	Harvard	ECAC Hockey	Buffalo Sabres
6	177	Zach Schulz ^{†}	Wisconsin	Big Ten	New York Islanders
6	179	Warren Clark ^{†}	St. Cloud State	NCHC	Tampa Bay Lightning
6	182	Ryan Conmy ^{†}	New Hampshire	Hockey East	Los Angeles Kings
6	183	Ty Henricks ^{†}	Western Michigan	NCHC	New York Rangers
6	188	Ryan Walsh ^{†}	Cornell	ECAC Hockey	Boston Bruins
6	190	Michael Emerson ^{†}	North Dakota	NCHC	Carolina Hurricanes
7	193	Jack Harvey ^{†}	Boston University	Hockey East	Tampa Bay Lightning
6	196	David Klee ^{†}	North Dakota	NCHC	San Jose Sharks
7	197	Luke Mittelstadt	Minnesota	Big Ten	Montreal Canadiens
7	204	Owen Beckner ^{†}	Colorado College	NCHC	Ottawa Senators
7	212	Zaccharya Wisdom ^{†}	Colorado College	NCHC	Seattle Kraken
7	213	James Clark ^{†}	Minnesota	Big Ten	Minnesota Wild
7	214	Casper Nassen ^{†}	Miami	NCHC	Boston Bruins
7	215	Nicholas Vantassell ^{†}	Massachusetts	Hockey East	Ottawa Senators
7	216	Matt Copponi	Merrimack	Hockey East	Edmonton Oilers
7	218	Aiden Fink ^{†}	Penn State	Big Ten	Nashville Predators
7	221	Sebastian Bradshaw ^{†}	New Hampshire	Hockey East	Dallas Stars

† incoming freshman
Note: players who later became eligible for NCAA participation due to 2024 rule changes are not included.

== See also ==
- 2022–23 NCAA Division I women's ice hockey season
- 2022–23 NCAA Division II men's ice hockey season
- 2022–23 NCAA Division III men's ice hockey season
