= Skyler Brind'Amour =

American ice hockey player (born 1999)

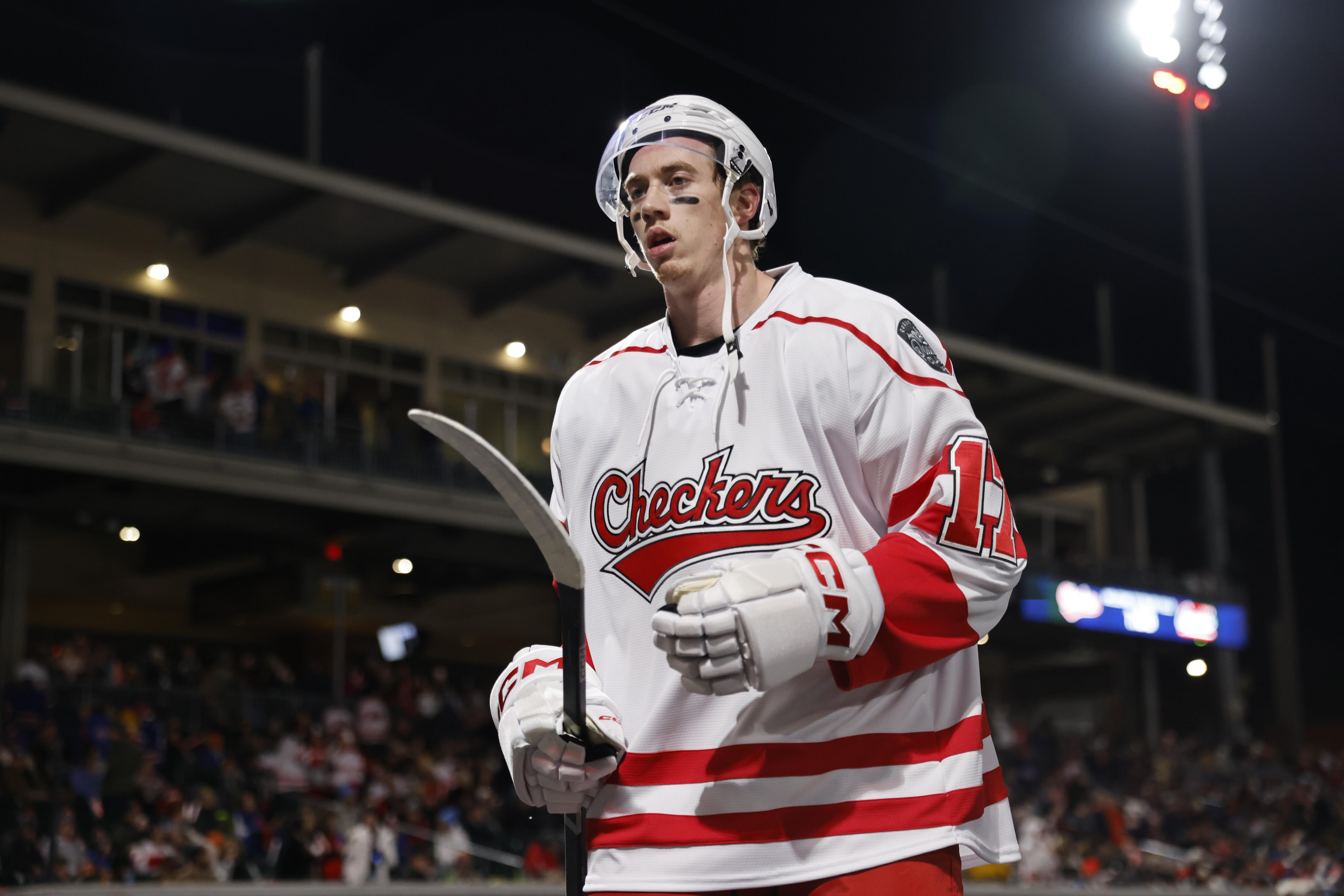
- Brind'Amour playing for the Charlotte Checkers in the January 2024 Queen City Outdoor Classic
- Born: July 27, 1999 (age 27) Raleigh, North Carolina, U.S.
- Height: 6 ft 2 in (188 cm)
- Weight: 195 lb (88 kg; 13 st 13 lb)
- Position: Center
- Shoots: Left
- NHL team (P) Cur. team: Carolina Hurricanes; Chicago Wolves (AHL)
- NHL draft: 177th overall, 2017; Edmonton Oilers
- Playing career: 2023–present

Skyler Brind'Amour (born July 27, 1999) is an American professional ice hockey center who is currently playing for the Chicago Wolves of the American Hockey League (AHL) as a prospect to the Carolina Hurricanes of the National Hockey League (NHL). He is the son of Rod Brind'Amour, who is the head coach of the Hurricanes. Brind'Amour made his debut on April 16, 2025 playing with the Hurricanes in a game against the Montreal Canadiens.

== Early life and family ==
Brind'Armour was born July 27, 1999 in Raleigh, North Carolina. He is the son of Rod Brind'Amour, who at the time of his birth was an active NHL player for the Philadelphia Flyers, and who is currently the head coach of the Carolina Hurricanes.

== Playing career ==
=== Junior career and college ===
During the 2016–17 USHL season, Brind'Amour played for the USA Hockey National Development Team. He scored one goal in eight appearances. After the season, he was selected 177th overall by the Edmonton Oilers in the 2017 NHL entry draft.

During the 2017–18 BCHL season, he played for the Chilliwack Chiefs. From late 2019 through early 2023, Brind'Amour played four seasons of college hockey for the Quinnipiac Bobcats, an NCAA Division I program. In his fourth season, he was a part of the 2022–23 team which won the 2023 NCAA Division I men's ice hockey tournament. He was named the Eastern College Athletic Conference (ECAC) Best Defensive Forward and was named to the ECAC Third All-Star Team. In total, during his collegiate career he played 145 games, amassed 76 points (23 goals and 53 assists), and amassed 84 penalty minutes, and a +43 plus/minus rating.

=== Professional ===
Brind'Amour made his professional debut for the Charlotte Checkers of the American Hockey League (AHL) during the 2023–24 AHL season, appearing in 54 games, scoring 3 goals and 5 assists (for 8 cumulative points). At the time, the Checkers were the AHL affiliate of the Florida Panthers.

In October 2024, Brind'Amour signed a one-year two-way contract with the Carolina Hurricanes. During the 2023–24 AHL season, he played for the Chicago Wolves, which had replaced the Checkers as the Carolina Hurricanes' AHL affiliate. Brind'Amour made his debut on April 16, 2025, playing with the Hurricanes in a game against the Montreal Canadiens. He recorded his first NHL goal the day after in a game against the Ottawa Senators.

== Career statistics ==
			Regular season					Playoffs
Season	Team	League	GP	G	A	Pts	PIM	GP	G	A	Pts	PIM
2016–17	U.S. National Development Team	USHL	8	1	0	1	0	—	—	—	—	—
2017–18	Chilliwack Chiefs	BCHL	52	10	14	24	34	7	0	3	3	2
2018–19	Chilliwack Chiefs	BCHL	52	13	31	44	39	11	2	3	5	6
2019–20	Quinnipiac University	ECAC	34	4	9	13	16	—	—	—	—	—
2020–21	Quinnipiac University	ECAC	29	2	9	11	23	—	—	—	—	—
2021–22	Quinnipiac University	ECAC	41	3	17	20	18	—	—	—	—	—
2022–23	Quinnipiac University	ECAC	41	14	18	32	27	—	—	—	—	—
2023–24	Charlotte Checkers	AHL	54	3	5	8	10	3	0	1	1	0
2024–25	Chicago Wolves	AHL	68	16	8	24	40	2	0	0	0	0
2024–25	Carolina Hurricanes	NHL	2	1	0	1	2	—	—	—	—	—
2025–26	Chicago Wolves	AHL	68	16	18	34	36	21	2	2	4	16
2025–26	Carolina Hurricanes	NHL	4	0	0	0	2	—	—	—	—	—
NHL totals			6	1	0	1	4	—	—	—	—	—
