= Jacob Quillan =

Canadian ice hockey player (born 2002)

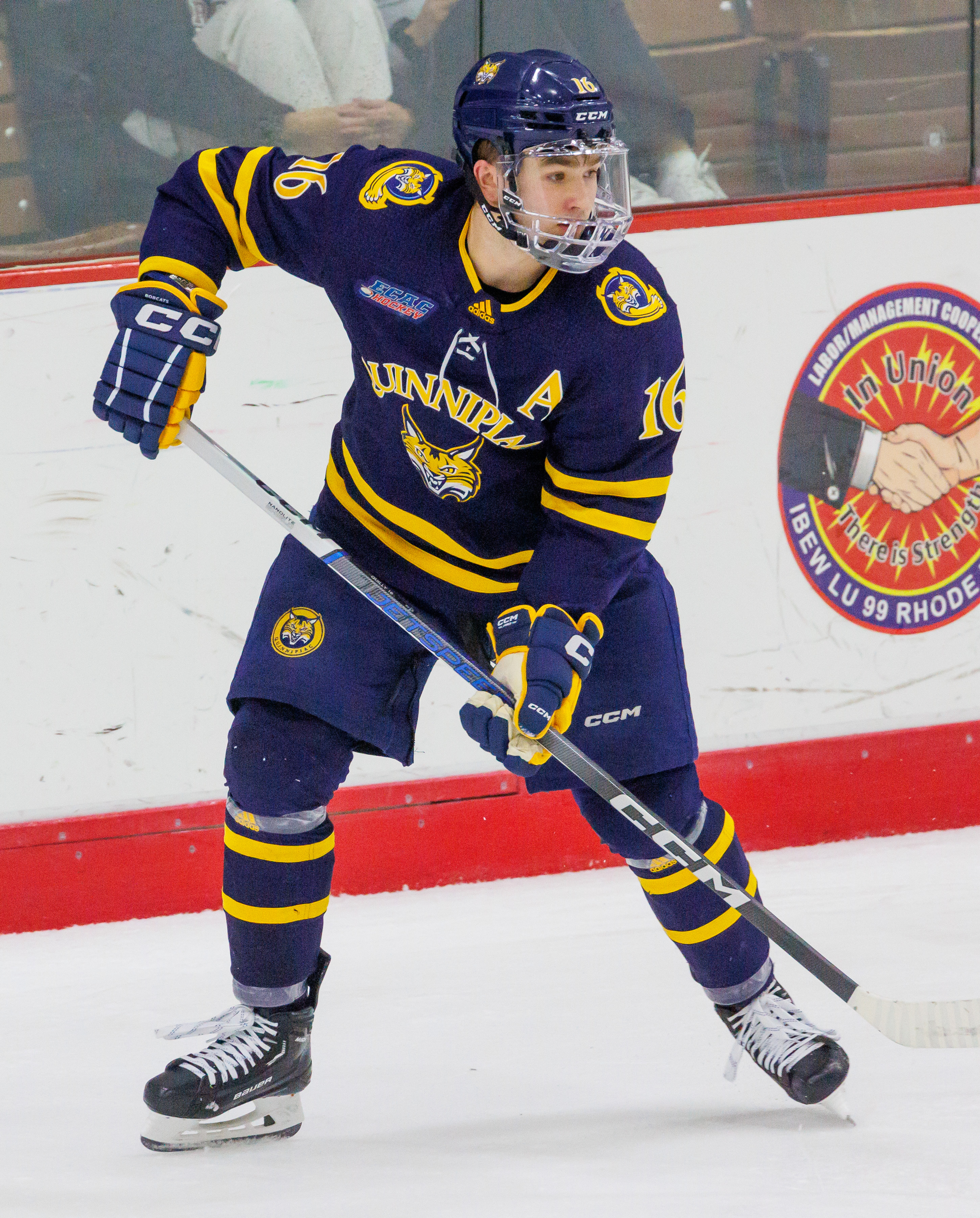
- Quillan with the Quinnipiac Bobcats in 2024
- Born: February 2, 2002 (age 24) Dartmouth, Nova Scotia, Canada
- Height: 6 ft 0 in (183 cm)
- Weight: 201 lb (91 kg; 14 st 5 lb)
- Position: Forward
- Shoots: Left
- NHL team Former teams: Vancouver Canucks; Toronto Maple Leafs
- NHL draft: Undrafted
- Playing career: 2024–present

Jacob Quillan (born February 2, 2002) is a Canadian professional ice hockey player who is a forward for the Vancouver Canucks of the National Hockey League (NHL). He played college ice hockey for Quinnipiac University, where he was named the Most Outstanding Player at the 2023 NCAA Division I men's ice hockey tournament. He has previously played in the NHL for the Toronto Maple Leafs, who signed him as an undrafted free agent in 2024.

== Playing career ==
=== College ===
Quillan began his collegiate career for the Quinnipiac Bobcats during the 2021–22 season, where he recorded two goals and seven assists in 37 games. He scored his first career goal on October 26, 2021, in a game against Holy Cross.

During the 2022–23 season, in his sophomore year, he recorded 19 goals and 19 assists in 41 games. During the Frozen Four at the 2023 NCAA Division I men's ice hockey tournament, Quillan scored two goals in a victory over Michigan and help Quinnipiac advance to the national championship game. During the championship game, he scored the game-winning goal ten seconds into overtime to defeat Minnesota and win the program's first NCAA title. He finished the NCAA Tournament with five goals, setting a new program record for goals in a single tournament, surpassing the previous record of four set by Matthew Peca in 2013. He was subsequently named the tournament Most Outstanding Player. During the 2023–24 season Quillan recorded 17 goals and 29 assists in 39 games. He recorded ten goals and 20 assists in 22 conference games, for a 1.36 points per game average. Following the season he was named an All-ECAC Second Team selection and ECAC Hockey Best Defensive Forward. He finished his collegiate career with 38 goals and 55 assists in 116 NCAA games.

=== Professional ===
On April 1, 2024, Quillan signed a two-year, entry-level contract with the Toronto Maple Leafs.

Starting his career off with the Toronto Marlies, Quillian played well in his debut season, and was rewarded with a call up to the Maple Leafs roster on January 22, 2025 following an injury to Max Pacioretty. He made his NHL debut three nights later in a game against his hometown Ottawa Senators in Ottawa, playing on the team's fourth-line alongside Fraser Minten and Ryan Reaves. His ice-time was limited to just over 5 minutes, as in the first period Quillan was struck by a knee-on-knee hit from Senators forward Nick Cousins, although he remained in the game.

On October 15, 2026, Quillan was traded to the Vancouver Canucks, alongside Brandon Buhr, in exchange for Aatu Räty.

== Career statistics ==
			Regular season					Playoffs
Season	Team	League	GP	G	A	Pts	PIM	GP	G	A	Pts	PIM
2020–21	Penticton Vees	BCHL	20	13	14	27	2	—	—	—	—	—
2021–22	Quinnipiac University	ECAC	36	2	7	9	24	—	—	—	—	—
2022–23	Quinnipiac University	ECAC	41	19	19	38	12	—	—	—	—	—
2023–24	Quinnipiac University	ECAC	39	17	29	46	16	—	—	—	—	—
2023–24	Toronto Marlies	AHL	7	0	1	1	2	3	0	0	0	2
2024–25	Toronto Marlies	AHL	67	18	19	37	38	2	0	0	0	0
2024–25	Toronto Maple Leafs	NHL	1	0	0	0	0	—	—	—	—	—
2025–26	Toronto Marlies	AHL	40	14	22	36	23	19	3	6	9	18
2025–26	Toronto Maple Leafs	NHL	23	1	2	3	2	—	—	—	—	—
2026–27	Toronto Marlies	AHL	4	0	0	0	2	—	—	—	—	—
NHL totals			24	1	2	3	2	—	—	—	—	—

== Awards and honours ==
Award	Year	Ref
College
NCAA All-Tournament Team	2023	
NCAA Tournament MVP	2023	
ECAC Hockey Best Defensive Forward	2024	
All-ECAC Second Team	2024	
AHL
Calder Cup champion	2026	

Awards and achievements
Preceded by Michael Benning	NCAA Tournament Most Outstanding Player; 2023	Succeeded by Matt Davis
Preceded by Skyler Brind’Amour	ECAC Hockey Best Defensive Forward; 2023–24	Succeeded by Jack Ricketts
