= Matt Brown (ice hockey) =

American ice hockey player (born 1999)

- Born: August 9, 1999 (age 26) Wood-Ridge, New Jersey, USA
- Height: 5 ft 10 in (178 cm)
- Weight: 190 lb (86 kg; 13 st 8 lb)
- Position: Left wing
- Shoots: Left
- Allsv team Former teams: IK Oskarshamn; Lehigh Valley Phantoms; Bakersfield Condors
- NHL draft: Undrafted
- Playing career: 2023–present

Matthew Brown (born August 9, 1999) is an American professional ice hockey left winger who plays for IK Oskarshamn of the HockeyAllsvenskan (Allsv). He previously played college ice hockey at Boston University. He was an All-American for BU in 2023.

== Playing career ==
Born in Wood-Ridge, New Jersey, Brown played junior hockey in and around his home town of Tenafly, graduating from Tenafly High School in 2017. Afterwards, he travelled west and joined the Dubuque Fighting Saints but lasted just 6 scoreless games before changing leagues and finishing out the year with the Odessa Jackalopes. For his final season of juniors, Brown gave the USHL one more try and saw much greater success with the Des Moines Buccaneers. He led the club in scoring and was a point per game player, helping the team reach the second round of the playoffs.

The following fall, Brown began attending the University of Massachusetts Lowell and led the team in scoring as a freshman. While his overall total was unremarkable, Brown helped to put the club in position for a potential NCAA tournament berth. Lowell finished the 3rd in the Hockey East standings that season and were preparing for their postseason run, however, before any games could be played the remainder of the campaign was cancelled due to the coronavirus pandemic. Brown returned for the abbreviated Covid season in 2021 but neither he nor the River Hawks were quite up to the standards set before the pandemic.

That summer, Brown decided to use the new NCAA transfer rules and switched to Boston University. Hopes were high for Brown but he got off to a slow start and then sat out for over a month and didn't return until after Thanksgiving. His scoring increased afterwards and he appeared to be rounding into form, however, his life changed on January 30 when his mother, Debbie, died at the age of 51. Brown was able to collect himself long enough to score the deciding goal in the Beanpot semifinal against Harvard.

After a summer to come to term with the new reality, Brown was also had to contend with a 3rd head coach in 4 years as BU brought in Jay Pandolfo as the new bench boss. The new system, as well as the arrival of freshman phenom Lane Hutson, helped Brown raise his profile and post career numbers across the board. He nearly doubled his totals in all three categories and finished in the top-10 in the nation. While also helping BU win both the regular season and conference tournament titles, Brown was named to the All-American second team and assisted on the overtime winner in the Hockey East championship. Brown helped BU reach the Frozen Four for the first time in 8 years but could not stop the team from losing to the #1 overall seed.

Brown signed with the Lehigh Valley Phantoms of the American Hockey League on April 13, 2023. He split his first professional season between Lehigh Valley and the ECHL's Reading Royals, representing Reading in the 2024 ECHL All-Star Game.

After two seasons within the Phantoms organization, Brown was signed to a one-year AHL contract with the Bakersfield Condors, the primary affiliate to the Edmonton Oilers, for the 2025–26 season on August 11, 2025. Brown registered just 1 assist through 17 appearances with the Condors, and primarily played with ECHL affiliate the Fort Wayne Komets. As a key offensive player for the Komets he scored 35 points in 42 regular season games. He continued his strong scoring output in the playoffs, scoring 15 points in 15 games as the Komets made it all the way to the conference finals.

As a free agent from the Condors, Brown left North America to sign a one-year contract with Swedish second tier club, IK Oskarshamn of the Allsvenskan, on June 6, 2026.

== Career statistics ==
			Regular season					Playoffs
Season	Team	League	GP	G	A	Pts	PIM	GP	G	A	Pts	PIM
2017–18	Dubuque Fighting Saints	USHL	6	0	0	0	2	—	—	—	—	—
2017–18	Odessa Jackalopes	NAHL	41	16	25	41	18	3	1	0	1	0
2018–19	Des Moines Buccaneers	USHL	57	30	27	57	10	5	4	2	6	0
2019–20	Massachusetts Lowell	HE	33	6	18	24	10	—	—	—	—	—
2020–21	Massachusetts Lowell	HE	19	8	5	13	10	—	—	—	—	—
2021–22	Boston University	HE	24	7	10	17	4	—	—	—	—	—
2022–23	Boston University	HE	39	16	31	47	6	—	—	—	—	—
2023–24	Lehigh Valley Phantoms	AHL	13	0	2	2	2	—	—	—	—	—
2023–24	Reading Royals	ECHL	38	13	28	41	12	—	—	—	—	—
2024–25	Lehigh Valley Phantoms	AHL	6	0	0	0	0	—	—	—	—	—
2024–25	Reading Royals	ECHL	54	19	22	41	8	4	0	1	1	0
2025–26	Fort Wayne Komets	ECHL	42	12	23	35	6	15	5	10	15	0
2025–26	Bakersfield Condors	AHL	17	0	1	1	2	—	—	—	—	—
AHL totals			36	0	3	3	4	—	—	—	—	—

== Awards and honors ==
Award	Year	Ref
College
All-Hockey East First Team	2022–23	
AHCA East Second Team All-American	2022–23	
