= Jason Polin =

American ice hockey player (born 1999)

- Born: June 17, 1999 (age 27) Holt, Michigan, U.S.
- Height: 6 ft 0 in (183 cm)
- Weight: 198 lb (90 kg; 14 st 2 lb)
- Position: Right wing
- Shoots: Right
- NHL team (P) Cur. team Former teams: Buffalo Sabres; Rochester Americans (AHL); Colorado Avalanche
- NHL draft: Undrafted
- Playing career: 2023–present

Jason Polin (born June 17, 1999) is an American professional ice hockey player for the Rochester Americans of the American Hockey League (AHL) while under contract to the Buffalo Sabres of the National Hockey League (NHL). Polin played college ice hockey at Western Michigan.

== Playing career ==
=== Junior ===
Polin played three seasons for the Cedar Rapids RoughRiders of the United States Hockey League (USHL). During this time he attended Washington High School. During the 2018–19 season, he ranked second on the team in scoring with 50 points on 30 goals and 20 assists. During his career with the RoughRiders, he recorded 55 goals and 38 assists in 163 games.

=== College ===
Polin began his collegiate career for the Western Michigan Broncos during the 2019–20 season, where he recorded seven goals and two assists in 31 games. During the 2020–21 season in his sophomore year, he recorded seven goals and seven assists in 23 games, in a season that was shortened due to the COVID-19 pandemic. During the 2021–22 season in his junior year, he recorded 16 goals and ten assists in 39 games.

On September 15, 2022, he was named captain for the 2022–23 season. On December 29, 2022, during the championship game at the Great Lakes Invitational (GLI), Polin recorded his fifth hat trick of the season to help the Broncos win the GLI, and was subsequently named the tournament MVP. He became the first player in GLI history to score six goals in a single tournament, surpassing the previous record of five held by six different players. His five hat tricks ranked second all-time in Western Michigan program history, one short of the record of six set by Ross Fitzpatrick in 1982. During his senior year he had career highs in points (47), goals (30), assists (17), shots (152), power-play goals (6), game-winning goals (4), shorthanded goals (2) and plus-minus (+26). His 30 goals tied for the NCAA lead, with Adam Fantilli, and set a National Collegiate Hockey Conference (NCHC) single-season record, surpassing the previous record of 29 goals set by Josh Archibald in 2014. He also led the NCAA in hat tricks and set an NCHC record with five. Following an outstanding season, he was named NCHC Player of the Year and NCHC Forward of the Year and an AHCA West Second Team All-American. He became the first Broncos player to win the award. He was also named a top-ten finalist for the Hobey Baker Award. He finished his collegiate career with 60 goals and 36 assists in 132 games.

=== Professional ===
On March 29, 2023, Polin signed a one-year contract with the Colorado Avalanche for the 2023–24 season. He was subsequently assigned to the Avalanche's AHL affiliate, the Colorado Eagles on a professional tryout.

After overcoming an early season injury, Polin earned a recall to the Avalanche at the mid-point the season and made his NHL debut in a fourth-line role against the Boston Bruins on January 8, 2024. He later registered his first NHL goal and point, scoring to level the game at 2–2 in an eventual 7–4 victory over the Ottawa Senators on January 16, 2024. Returning to the Eagles following 7 appearances, Polin played out the remainder of the season in the AHL, posting 4 goals and 10 points through 42 regular season games.

As a restricted free agent at the conclusion of the season, Polin was re-signed to a one-year, two-way contract with the Avalanche for the 2024–25 season on July 6, 2024. Returning to the Eagles, Polin again missed time due to injury during the campaign but tallied 11 goals and 19 points in 39 regular-season outings. He was recalled and featured in two games with the Avalanche, going scoreless, before finishing the season in the playoffs with the Eagles.

On June 21, 2025, Polin opted to extend his stay in Colorado by re-signing to a further one-year, two-way contract extension. In the 2025–26 season, Polin registered 21 points through 46 regular season games with the Eagles, and added 9 points through the post-season, helping the club reach the Western Conference finals. He was scoreless in 4 NHL appearances in recalls to the Avalanche.

As a free agent at the conclusion of his contract with the Avalanche, Polin was signed to a one-year, two-way contract with the Buffalo Sabres on July 1, 2026.

== Career statistics ==
			Regular season					Playoffs
Season	Team	League	GP	G	A	Pts	PIM	GP	G	A	Pts	PIM
2016–17	Cedar Rapids RoughRiders	USHL	60	8	5	13	12	—	—	—	—	—
2017–18	Cedar Rapids RoughRiders	USHL	38	12	9	21	12	—	—	—	—	—
2018–19	Cedar Rapids RoughRiders	USHL	59	30	20	50	37	6	5	4	9	4
2019–20	Western Michigan University	NCHC	31	7	2	9	8	—	—	—	—	—
2020–21	Western Michigan University	NCHC	23	7	7	14	4	—	—	—	—	—
2021–22	Western Michigan University	NCHC	39	16	10	26	4	—	—	—	—	—
2022–23	Western Michigan University	NCHC	39	30	17	47	13	—	—	—	—	—
2022–23	Colorado Eagles	AHL	7	0	1	1	2	4	0	0	0	2
2023–24	Colorado Eagles	AHL	42	4	6	10	21	2	0	0	0	0
2023–24	Colorado Avalanche	NHL	7	1	0	1	2	—	—	—	—	—
2024–25	Colorado Eagles	AHL	39	11	8	19	11	7	1	0	1	0
2024–25	Colorado Avalanche	NHL	2	0	0	0	0	—	—	—	—	—
2025–26	Colorado Eagles	AHL	46	10	11	21	10	17	3	6	9	2
2025–26	Colorado Avalanche	NHL	4	0	0	0	0	—	—	—	—	—
NHL totals			13	1	0	1	2	—	—	—	—	—

== Awards and honors ==
Award	Year
College
All-NCHC First Team	2023
NCHC Player of the Year	2023
NCHC Forward of the Year	2023
AHCA West Second Team All-American	2023

Awards and achievements
Preceded by Bobby Brink	NCHC Forward of the Year; 2022–23	Succeeded by Jackson Blake
Preceded by Bobby Brink	NCHC Player of the Year; 2022–23	Succeeded by Jackson Blake
