= Yaniv Perets =

Canadian ice hockey player (born 2000)

- Born: March 4, 2000 (age 26) Dollard-des-Ormeaux, Quebec, Canada
- Height: 6 ft 1 in (185 cm)
- Weight: 180 lb (82 kg; 12 st 12 lb)
- Position: Goaltender
- Catches: Left
- AHL team Former teams: Lehigh Valley Phantoms; Carolina Hurricanes
- NHL draft: Undrafted
- Playing career: 2023–present

Yaniv Perets (born March 4, 2000) is a Canadian professional ice hockey goaltender for the Lehigh Valley Phantoms in the American Hockey League (AHL). He played collegiate hockey for Quinnipiac University.

== Early life ==
Perets was born in Dollard-des-Ormeaux, Quebec, and is Jewish. He has been friends with fellow goalie Devon Levi since childhood, and the two played on the same youth teams for several years. Perets attended West Island College in Dollard-des-Ormeaux.

== Playing career ==
=== Amateur ===
During the 2018–19 season, Perets appeared in 36 games for the Boston Junior Bruins of the United States Premier Hockey League (USPHL), where he posted a 23–10–1 record, with a 2.48 goals-against-average (GAA), and a .929. save percentage. He helped lead the Bruins to the Dineen Cup as league champions and was named NCDC Goaltender of the Year. In October 2018, he committed to play college ice hockey for the Quinnipiac Bobcats during the 2020–21 season.

During the 2019–20 season, he appeared in 37 games for the Penticton Vees of the British Columbia Hockey League (BCHL), where he posted a 25–8–1 record, with a 2.19 GAA, a .918 save percentage and five shutouts. He ranked second in the BCHL in shutouts, third in GAA, fifth in wins and sixth in save percentage. During the postseason he posted a 4–0–1 record with a 1.96 GAA and .921 save percentage before the tournament was cancelled due to the COVID-19 pandemic.

During the 2020–21 season, he played 10 games for the Vees in the BCHL's training season before it was paused due to the COVID-19 pandemic. He posted a 9–1–0 record, with a 1.80 GAA, a .931 save percentage and two shutouts. He was tied for first in the league in shutouts, ranked second in wins and was fourth in GAA and save percentage and helped lead the team to the BCHL's Okanagan Cup.

=== Collegiate ===
On January 19, 2021, it was announced he was added to the Quinnipiac Bobcats' roster for the second semester. He made his collegiate debut for the Bobcats on February 13, 2021, and recorded five saves in 14:49 in a 9–0 win against Colgate.

During the 2021–22 season he posted a 22–5–2 record with a 1.17 GAA, .939 save percentage and 11 shutouts. He was named the ECAC Hockey player of the month for four consecutive months from November to February. He led the NCAA in save percentage, GAA and shutouts. He also set the ECAC Hockey league record in save percentage, GAA, and shutouts, putting together one of the best goaltending seasons in the history of the league. Following an outstanding season, he was named to the All-ECAC Hockey First Team, ECAC Hockey Player of the Year and won the Ken Dryden Award. He was also named a top-ten finalist for the Hobey Baker Award, a top-three finalist for the Mike Richter Award and was named an AHCA East Second Team All-American.

=== Professional ===
Perets signed with the Carolina Hurricanes for the 2023–24 season; after briefly appearing for Hurricanes in two preseason games, he was reassigned to the Norfolk Admirals of the ECHL. Perets was recalled to the Hurricanes in December 2023 but was returned to the minors later in the same month without seeing playing time.

Perets made his NHL debut for the Hurricanes on January 15, 2024 against the Los Angeles Kings in relief of starter Antti Raanta.

As a free agent from the Hurricanes following two seasons within the organization, Perets was signed to a one-year AHL contract with the Lehigh Valley Phantoms, affiliate to the Philadelphia Flyers on July 23, 2025.

== Career statistics ==
			Regular season									Playoffs
Season	Team	League	GP	W	L	T/OT	MIN	GA	SO	GAA	SV%	GP	W	L	MIN	GA	SO	GAA	SV%
2016–17	Brockville Braves	CCHL	18	8	8	1	1,017	43	1	2.54	.926	1	0	0	24	1	0	2.45	.933
2017–18	Brockville Braves	CCHL	6	2	4	0	362	19	0	3.15	.911	—	—	—	—	—	—	—	—
2017–18	Boston Junior Bruins	USPHL	34	17	6	1	1,449	60	0	2.48	.930	6	—	—	—	—	—	2.33	.928
2018–19	Boston Junior Bruins	USPHL	36	23	10	1	2,054	85	3	2.48	.929	8	6	2	482	13	2	1.62	.949
2019–20	Penticton Vees	BCHL	37	25	8	2	2,165	79	5	2.19	.918	5	4	1	305	10	0	1.96	.921
2020–21	Quinnipiac University	ECAC	2	0	0	0	32	0	0	0.00	1.000	—	—	—	—	—	—	—	—
2021–22	Quinnipiac University	ECAC	31	22	5	2	1,842	36	11	1.17	.939	—	—	—	—	—	—	—	—
2022–23	Quinnipiac University	ECAC	41	34	4	3	2,417	60	10	1.49	.931	—	—	—	—	—	—	—	—
2023–24	Norfolk Admirals	ECHL	34	18	11	3	1,944	97	2	2.99	.889	10	5	5	612	31	0	3.04	.888
2023–24	Carolina Hurricanes	NHL	1	0	0	0	13	0	0	0.00	1.000	—	—	—	—	—	—	—	—
2024–25	Bloomington Bison	ECHL	27	12	12	1	1,530	66	3	2.59	.921	—	—	—	—	—	—	—	—
2024–25	Chicago Wolves	AHL	4	1	2	1	244	16	0	3.93	.846	—	—	—	—	—	—	—	—
2024–25	Carolina Hurricanes	NHL	1	0	0	0	8	1	0	7.32	.857	—	—	—	—	—	—	—	—
2025–26	Reading Royals	ECHL	27	14	8	4	1565	74	3	2.84	.910	4	1	3	271	8	0	1.77	.940
2025–26	Lehigh Valley Phantoms	AHL	5	2	3	0	288	13	1	2.71	.905	—	—	—	—	—	—	—	—
NHL totals			2	0	0	0	21	1	0	2.86	.875	—	—	—	—	—	—	—	—

== Awards and honours ==
Award	Year
College
All-ECAC First Team	2022, 2023
ECAC Hockey Player of the Year	2022
Ken Dryden Award	2022, 2023
AHCA East Second Team All-American	2022, 2023
NCAA Division I champion	2023
NCAA All-Tournament Team	2023

== See also ==
- List of select Jewish ice hockey players

Awards and achievements
Preceded by Odeen Tufto	ECAC Hockey Player of the Year; 2021–22	Succeeded by Sean Farrell
Preceded by Keith Petruzelli	Ken Dryden Award; 2021–22, 2022–23	Succeeded by Ian Shane
