= Zach Metsa =

American ice hockey player (born 1998)

- Born: October 19, 1998 (age 28) Delafield, Wisconsin, U.S.
- Height: 5 ft 9 in (175 cm)
- Weight: 181 lb (82 kg; 12 st 13 lb)
- Position: Defense
- Shoots: Right
- NHL team: Buffalo Sabres
- NHL draft: Undrafted
- Playing career: 2023–present

Zach Metsa (born October 19, 1998) is an American professional ice hockey player who is a defenseman for the Buffalo Sabres of the National Hockey League (NHL).

Before playing professionally, Metsa played five seasons of NCAA Division I hockey with the Quinnipiac Bobcats. In his final collegiate season, he was captain of the 2022-23 Bobcats team which won the university its first-ever men's ice hockey national championship title.

== Playing career ==
=== Junior ===
Metsa began the 2017–18 season with the Youngstown Phantoms, where he recorded one goal and 12 assists in 37 games. On February 7, 2018, he was traded to the Central Illinois Flying Aces. He finished the season with three goals and eight assists in 23 games for the Flying Aces.

=== Collegiate ===
Metsa began his collegiate career for Quinnipiac during the 2018–19 season. During his freshman year he recorded two goals and two assists in 32 games. During the 2019–20 season in his sophomore year he recorded five goals and 12 assists in 34 games.

During the 2020–21 season in his junior year he recorded five goals and 21 assists in 29 games. He was tied for the national lead among defensemen in points and led all defensemen in assists (21), power-play assists (11) and power-play points (14). Following an outstanding season he was named to the All-ECAC First Team. He was also named co-winner of the Coaches' Award, as selected by the men's ice hockey coaching staff.

On May 21, 2021, he was named an assistant captain for the 2021–22 season. During his senior year he recorded 10 goals and 27 assists in 42 games. Metsa and the Bobcats led both the league and the nation in scoring defense, allowing just 0.93 goals per-game. He blocked 24 shots, and led the team during the regular season with 34 points. He ranked in the top three in the nation all season amongst defenseman in points, assists, and plus/minus. Following an outstanding season he was named the ECAC Hockey Best Defensive Defenseman and named to the All-ECAC First Team. He was also named an AHCA East First Team All-American.

=== Professional ===
After guiding the Bobcats to a National Championship victory as team captain in the 2022–23 season, Metsa embarked on his professional career in signing a two-year contract with the Rochester Americans of the AHL on April 13, 2023. He immediately joined the Americans for the remainder of their playoff run.

On July 1, 2025, Metsa secured an NHL contract, signing a one-year, two-way deal with the Americans affiliate, the Buffalo Sabres.

== Personal life ==
Metsa was born to Tom Metsa and Lisa Driscoll. His father, Tom, played hockey at Hamline University.

== Career statistics ==
			Regular season					Playoffs
Season	Team	League	GP	G	A	Pts	PIM	GP	G	A	Pts	PIM
2014–15	Waterloo Black Hawks	USHL	2	0	0	0	0	—	—	—	—	—
2015–16	Sioux Falls Stampede	USHL	2	0	0	0	0	—	—	—	—	—
2016–17	Merritt Centennials	BCHL	57	3	24	27	15	11	0	5	5	2
2017–18	Youngstown Phantoms	USHL	37	1	12	13	12	—	—	—	—	—
2017–18	Central Illinois Flying Aces	USHL	23	3	8	11	12	—	—	—	—	—
2018–19	Quinnipiac University	ECAC	32	2	2	4	4	—	—	—	—	—
2019–20	Quinnipiac University	ECAC	34	5	12	17	2	—	—	—	—	—
2020–21	Quinnipiac University	ECAC	29	5	21	26	8	—	—	—	—	—
2021–22	Quinnipiac University	ECAC	42	10	27	37	8	—	—	—	—	—
2022–23	Quinnipiac University	ECAC	40	9	28	37	12	—	—	—	—	—
2022–23	Rochester Americans	AHL	—	—	—	—	—	13	1	2	3	0
2023–24	Rochester Americans	AHL	54	7	17	24	16	5	0	1	1	0
2024–25	Rochester Americans	AHL	69	7	36	46	16	8	0	3	3	20
2025–26	Rochester Americans	AHL	19	2	13	15	4	—	—	—	—	—
2025–26	Buffalo Sabres	NHL	43	2	4	6	8	2	1	0	1	0
NHL totals			43	2	4	6	8	2	1	0	1	0

== Awards and honors ==
Award	Year
College
All-ECAC First Team	2021
All-ECAC First Team	2022
ECAC Hockey Best Defensive Defenseman	2022
AHCA East First Team All-American	2022
All-ECAC Second Team	2023
AHCA East Second Team All-American	2023
NCAA All-Tournament Team	2023

Awards and achievements
Preceded by Pierson Brandon	ECAC Hockey Best Defensive Defenseman; 2021–22	Succeeded by Henry Thrun
