= 2022–23 Quinnipiac Bobcats men's ice hockey season =

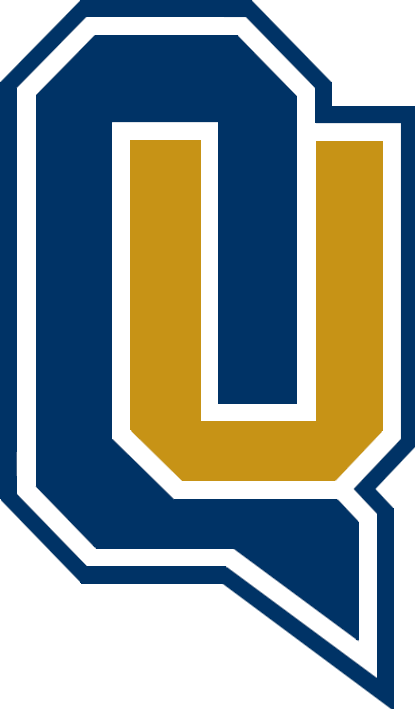

NCAA Division I National Champion Friendship Four, Champion Connecticut Ice, Champion ECAC Hockey Regular Season Champion NCAA Tournament, Champion
- Conference: 1st ECAC Hockey
- Home ice: M&T Bank Arena

Rankings
- USCHO: #1
- USA Today: #1

Record
- Overall: 34–4–3
- Conference: 20–2–0
- Home: 15–0–1
- Road: 14–3–1
- Neutral: 5–1–1

Coaches and captains
- Head coach: Rand Pecknold
- Assistant coaches: Joe Dumais; Mike Corbett; Justin Eddy
- Captain: Zach Metsa
- Alternate captain(s): Desi Burgart; Ethan de Jong; Michael Lombardi

The 2022–23 Quinnipiac Bobcats Men's ice hockey season was the 47th season of play for the program, the 25th at the Division I level and 18th in ECAC Hockey. The Bobcats represented Quinnipiac University in the 2022–23 NCAA Division I men's ice hockey season, were coached by Rand Pecknold in his 29th season, and played their home games at the M&T Bank Arena. The team won the 2023 NCAA Division I men's ice hockey tournament for the first national championship in program history.

== Season ==
=== Roster changes ===
Despite coming within a whisker of reaching the Frozen Four in 2022, Quinnipiac saw a great deal of turnover in its roster. Aside from the graduations, 5 undergrads transferred away, though only two (Leyh and Smilanic) had seen significant playing time. While the team also lost one of two starting goaltenders in Dylan St. Cyr, they retained All-American Yaniv Perets so their situation in the crease was presumably settled. to replace the 13 departures, coach Pecknold brought in eight freshmen and three transfers. To shore up the blue line, two graduate transfers were brought and were expected to use their years of experience to keep the defensive corps. The other transfer was sophomore Collin Graf who was coming over from a difficult situation at Union. The forward lines, which had lost three of its top 5 scorers from '22, would be a work in progress but the addition of Sam Lipkin, an Arizona Coyotes draft pick, was expected to provide some needed offense.

=== Early difficulties ===
The Bobcats started the season about as well as could be expected with a 4–0 win over Boston College. While the goals came from four different players, the defense limited the Eagles to just 16 shots on goal. Perhaps being a bit overconfident, Quinnipiac was quite as good in their second game against Long Island but it was the third match that revealed a potential problem for the club. After beginning their road series with North Dakota with a 3-goal first period, the team played what was probably its worst period all season and were outshot 7–21 in the second. They got into penalty trouble in the third and allowed UND to take a 5–4 lead with about 12 minutes to play. Quinnipiac fought back to tie the game and avoid disaster, but the lax play was something that could not be repeated by the team if it wanted to fulfill its championship aspirations. The rematch saw a much more defensively-conscious effort from the Bobcats and they cut North Dakota's shot total in half, winning by a relatively comfortable 6–2 margin.

After heading back east, Quinnipiac found itself ranked third in the national polls. The team, however, appeared to forget the lesson of the previous week and they didn't take Maine seriously. The offense was shut down by the Black Bears but the defense held up through two periods. Unfortunately, the floodgates opened in the third and Maine scored 4 times to produce a stunning upset. Things got so bad that Perets was pulled but by then it was too late to change the outcome of the game. Ad they had against North Dakota, Quinnipiac showed up for the rematch and replied with their own 4-goal period to earn a split before heading for home.

=== ECAC dominance ===
While Quinnipiac had produced a respectable non-conference record in the first month of the season, the team's play wasn't as good as it could have been. The Bobcats took lose early mistakes to heart once they began their conference schedule began to play much more consistently. They controlled each of their next four games, posting two shutouts while the offense got into its stride. The power play was a strong point for the team with Graf, Lipkin, Ethan de Jong and team captain Zach Metsa working well together. The Bobcats scored 9 goals on the man-advantage over the 6-game stretch leading up to Thanksgiving and placed themselves squarely atop the conference standings.

The Bobcats took a trip overseas and took part in the Friendship Four tournament in Belfast. It was the first edition of the series in three years with the layoff caused by COVID-19. After a relatively easy win over Dartmouth, the Bobcats were set against #17 Massachusetts for the championship. The team's power play proved key to their success as the Bobcats went two for three to finish regulation with a 2–2 tie. After a scoreless overtime, Cristophe Tellier scored the lone goal in the shootout to win the Belpot Trophy for Quinnipiac.

Once they returned across the Atlantic, the Bobcats won another squeaker thanks to their power play before utterly dominating on offense. In the final three games of the first half, Quinnipiac scored 22 goals with contributions coming from all quarters. Collin Graf led the way with 26 points but half a dozen other players were well into double-digits at the time including Lipkin and Jacob Quillan who were both sitting at 19.

=== Bump in the road ===
The offense continued to score at a high clip once the team returned from the winter break. After two more wins, the Bobcats had a showdown with the other ECAC power that season and played host to #10 Harvard. Quinnipiac dominated the first two periods and carried a 3–0 edge into the third. Harvard tried to fight back in the final 20 minutes but they were only able to get a single goal past Perets which enabled the Bobcats to run their conference record to a perfect 12–0. The outstanding record also earned Quinnipiac the #1 spot in the polls. With the Connecticut Ice tournament coming up at the end of January, the team perhaps lost a bit of focus and were shoutout by Cornell, 0–4. Their poor performance carried over into the next game and, after getting out to a 2–0 lead, they surrendered three consecutive markers and lost back-to-back games. The losses knocked Quinnipiac down to #3 but it would take a calamity for the team to lost its position in the NCAA tournament by that point in the season.

To ensure that didn't happen, Quinnipiac redoubled its efforts on the defensive end and posted four shutouts over the next six games, including one in the rematch with Harvard. The offense too was on point, averaging over 4 goals per game in the final 10 matches of the regular season. Graf had continued to lead the team in all offensive categories and was among the national leaders with 49 points at the beginning of the postseason. More importantly, Quinnipiac had finished the year as the top team not only in ECAC Hockey but the entire eastern region. The Bobcats were #2 in the polls and national rankings behind only Minnesota and were mathematically guaranteed to make the NCAA tournament no matter what happened in the conference tournament.

=== Conference failure ===
As the top seed in the conference, Quinnipiac received a bye into the quarterfinals and awaited the lowest-seeded team from the first round survivors. As it turned out, the Bobcats played host to local rival Yale for a spot in the semis. The rivalry between the two had cooled over the past few seasons and Quinnipiac throttled the Bulldogs in the first game, allowing just 5 shots on goal while Perets earned his 9th shotout of the season. Yale played far better in the rematch but it still wasn't nearly enough and Quinnipiac's strong special teams play carried it to victory.

Quinnipiac headed off to Lake Placid and sought revenge against Colgate for the loss earlier in the season. Despite their best efforts, however, Quinnipiac's offense was unable to solve Raider netminder Carter Gylander. It took until their 4th power play of the game for the Bobcats to score and that was all they could muster in regulation. Fortunately, the team's defense was just as stingy as Colgate and overtime gave Quinnipiac a chance to earn the victory. As the game dragged on, however, it was Colgate that got stronger. The Raiders outshot the Bobcats after the start of the third and continued to fire pucks on goal. Finally, about midway through the second overtime, Ross Mitton knocked a loose puck past Perets to win the game for Colgate.

While the defeat didn't change Quinnipiac's position for the NCAA tournament, the team took the loss to heart coach Pecknold tried to make sure the players remembered the feeling as they entered the national tournament.

=== NCAA tournament ===
Quinnipiac received the #2 overall seed for the tournament and was placed nearest to its campus in the Bridgeport regional. Because Colgate ended up winning the ECAC tournament and receiving the 15-seed, Quinnipiac ended up seeing #14 Merrimack in the opening round. The Bobcats didn't take any chances with the Warriors and played their stingy brand of defense all game. Merrimack ended up getting just 15 shots on goal while Jacob Quillan led the way with a pair of goals for Quinnipiac.

After the first round of the tournament, all 4 Big Ten teams had won by at least 7 goals and there was some worry that the conference was going to completely dominate the tournament. Quinnipiac got its first chance to prove otherwise in the regional final against Ohio State. Unfortunately, just 91 seconds into the game, Perets slid a bit too far back after stopping a shot and allowed the puck to creep in over the line. After that inauspicious shot, however, the Bobcats fought back and scored twice in the span of 15 seconds to take a lead into the second period. The Buckeyes went into full attack mode in the middle frame but the Quinnipiac defense held Perets stopped the final 30+ shots and, despite being widely outshot, the Bobcats were able to pull out a 4–1 victory to reach the Frozen Four.

In the program's third trip to the national semifinal, Quinnipiac took on one of only two teams that had a better offense than the Bobcats; Michigan. The Wolverines boasted some of the top prospects in the nation, including Hobey Baker Award-winner, Adam Fantilli. The defense would need to hold up under the pressure while the offense had to at least keep contact with the high-flying Wolverines. Michigan, however, was prone to taking penalties and gave Quinnipiac their first opportunity just 3 minutes into the game. The Bobcats weren't able to score on the man-advantage, however, just after it ended, Quillan was able to fire a puck from behind the net, off of Erik Portillo's back, and into the net. Michigan did not take the flukey goal lying down and Seamus Casey tied the game just 90 seconds later. Quinnipiac continued to pressure Michigan and Quillan ended up getting on a breakaway, firing the puck between Portillo's legs for his second of the game. The game tilted back and forth for much of the next 20 minutes but eventually Fantilli broke through just past the midway point of the game for his 30th goal of the season. With the score now tied, both teams kept attacking, looking for the go-ahead marker. Both Perets and Portillo were called upon to make big saves for their teams. Early in the third, however, Sam Lipkin repeated Quillan opening goal feat and scored from behind the net after deflecting the puck in off of Portillo's skate. Once more in the lead, Quinnipiac was able to play their stifling defense and stop the Wolverines from getting many high-quality chances for a goal. After a solid backcheck in the middle of the period, Metsa fired a perfectly placed shot into the near corner of the net to give the Bobcats a 2-goal edge. The Wolverines desperately tried to score in the final 7 minutes, eventually being forced to pull Portillo early, but all that did was allow Ethan de Jong to get an empty-net goal and send the Bobcats to the title game for the third time.

==== National championship ====
In the final game of the season, Quinnipiac faced off against the #1 team, Minnesota. In the rare meeting between the top two teams in the nation, Quinnipiac possessed the #2 defense and a great deal of experience while the Gophers had the #1 offense and possibly the most talent of any team in the country. The game was nearly derailed just 21 seconds in when Skyler Brind'Amour was whistled for a penalty. The play was reviewed for a possible 5-minute major but the senior center was only given minor. Despite that, however, Quinnipiac had to defend one of the top power play units in the nation but they were able to escape by the skin of their teeth. After that, despite both teams averaging around 4 goals per game for the season, the two began fighting a defensive battle. While that should have suited Quinnipiac, the Bobcats were the first to make a mistake when Jayden Lee fanned on a long pass that ended up on the stick of Connor Kurth. Perets came out to challenge the shot but was caught out of position when the puck found its way to John Mittelstadt and Minnesota got an early lead. Both teams continued to counterpunch for the next 20 minutes and eventually Jaxon Nelson chopped a rebound off the back wall into the top corner of the net for the second Gopher goal. Knowing that they had to get the next goal, as a 0–3 hole was likely insurmountable, The Quinnipiac offense began to ratchet up the pressure and a brilliant play by Zach Metsa to first stop a clearing attempt with his glove, then walk down the wall before finding Cristophe Tellier in front of the net for the Bobcats' first goal of the game. The goal relieved some of the pressure, as Quinnipiac was only down by one with more than half of the game to play.

Over the next 20 minutes, Quinnipiac narrowly escaped disaster when Minnesota missed on several opportunities to score while the Bobcats were forced to press hard for the tying goal. Perets was not playing a particularly strong game but he was aided by fortune as several Gophers shots were sent wide. Despite the fortune that kept Minnesota from scoring, Quinnipiac remained short one goal and time was ticking away on their season. With about 5 minutes to play, Logan Cooley got into a tussle with one of the Bobcats and while one referee signaled that he was prepared to give a minor to both players, the other had already decided to hand Cooley a minor for high-sticking. The controversial penalty gave Quinnipiac its second power play of the game but the Minnesota players collapsed towards their cage to block several chances for the tying goal. As the penalty was getting ready to expire, Pecknold pulled Perets early, a ploy that had resulted in disaster during the 2022 tournament. Quinnipiac kept the pressure on Minnesota and, just as Cooley was skating back into the play, Collin Graf fired a shot on goal from the half wall. While he was probably looking to cause a deflection or a rebound, the puck found its way between the pads of Justen Close and skipped into the net, tying the game with less than 3 minutes left in regulation. Immediately after the goal, Quinnipiac seemed to relax and gave Minnesota an opportunity to regain the lead. Luckily, the Bobcats were able to clamp down in their own end and the two teams headed into overtime.

In the first championship game to reach extra time in 12 years, Quinnipiac set up a play drawn up by assistant coach Joe Dumais. The Bobcats had been the better team in the faceoff circle and were set for what to do if they won the draw. Minnesota's Jaxon Nelson won the opening faceoff on overtime, however, the puck sailed straight into the Bobcats' bench and the puck was set back at center ice. On the second draw, Jacob Quillan barely won the faceoff and the puck sat behind him at center ice. Both Minnesota wingers went for the rubber but Collin Graf beat them to it and knocked it back to Zach Metsa, who was standing in his defensive zone. While Mason Nevers headed towards Metsa to pressure the defenseman, the other winger, Bryce Brodzinski, blew a tire and was late getting back defensively. Metsa held the puck just inside his own blueline, waiting for the play to develop; Graf went over to the near wall at the redline, apparently waiting for a pass, and drew the attention of Michael Koster. However, Graf was a decoy and when Koster skated over to the wall it opened up a spot in the middle of the ice for Sam Lipkin, who was skating from the opposite side and had a clear lane to accept Metsa's pass. With a full head of steam, Lipkin raced down the right side into the Minnesota end with Jackson LaCombe defending. Meanwhile, after taking the faceoff, Jacob Quillan had skated over to the blue line on the left side of the ice and was left alone when Lipkin made his charge. Nelson spotted Quillan and tried to chase him down but the Minnesota center was a step behind. Lipkin fired the puck under the stick of LaCombe, across the front of the cage, to an open Quillan. Quillan danced between Nelson and a sprawled-out Close before backhanding the puck into an open net and winning the first national championship in school history.

Quillan's goal just 10 seconds in was also the quickest overtime marker in championship game history, beating the previous mark of 23 seconds set by Steve Alley in 1977.

== Departures ==
Player	Position	Nationality	Cause
Jack Babbage	Defenseman	United States	Transferred to New Hampshire
Nick Bochen	Defenseman	Canada	Transferred to Bentley
Wyatt Bongiovanni	Forward	United States	Graduation (signed with Winnipeg Jets)
Oliver Chau	Forward	Canada	Graduation (signed with Tucson Roadrunners)
Marcus Chorney	Defenseman	United States	Graduation (retired)
Brendan Less	Defenseman	United States	Graduation (signed with Worcester Railers)
Ethan Leyh	Forward	Canada	Transferred to Bentley
Liam McLinskey	Forward	United States	Transferred to Holy Cross
Griffin Mendel	Defenseman	Canada	Graduation (signed with Chicago Wolves)
Ty Smilanic	Forward	United States	Transferred to Wisconsin
Dylan St. Cyr	Goaltender	United States	Graduate transfer to Michigan State
Tony Stillwell	Defenseman	United States	Graduation (retired)
Guus van Nes	Forward	Netherlands	Graduation (retired)

== Recruiting ==
Player	Position	Nationality	Age	Notes
Matthew Campbell	Forward	Canada	19	North Vancouver, BC
Anthony Cipollone	Forward	United States	20	Purchase, NY
Chase Clark	Goaltender	United States	20	Williamsville, NY; selected 183rd overall in 2021
Victor Czerneckianair	Forward	United States	20	Southington, CT
Collin Graf	Forward	United States	20	Lincoln, MA; transfer from Union
Timothy Heinke	Forward	United States	20	Kensington, CT
Jake Johnson	Defenseman	United States	24	Bloomington, MN; graduate transfer from Rensselaer
Charles-Alexis Legault	Defenseman	Canada	19	Kelowna, BC
Samuel Lipkin	Forward	United States	19	Philadelphia, PA; selected 223rd overall in 2021
Jacob Nordqvist	Defenseman	Sweden	24	Göteborg, SWE; graduate transfer from Lake Superior State
Alex Power	Forward	Canada	20	St. John's, NL

== Roster ==
As of August 27, 2022.

No.	Nat.	Player	Class	Pos	Height	Weight	DoB	Hometown	Previous team	NHL rights
1	(Canada)	Yaniv Perets	Sophomore (RS)	G	6' 1" (1.85 m)	180 lb (82 kg)	2000-03-04	Dollard-des-Ormeaux, Quebec	Penticton Vees (BCHL)	—
2	(Finland)	Iivari Räsänen	Junior	D	6' 1" (1.85 m)	200 lb (91 kg)	2001-05-23	Tampere, Finland	Muskegon Lumberjacks (USHL)	—
3	(United States)	Jake Johnson	Graduate	D	6' 0" (1.83 m)	185 lb (84 kg)	1998-08-13	Bloomington, Minnesota	Rensselaer (ECAC)	—
4	(United States)	Michael Lombardi (A)	Graduate	D	6' 0" (1.83 m)	190 lb (86 kg)	1998-08-20	Barrington, Rhode Island	West Kelowna Warriors (BCHL)	—
5	(United States)	C. J. McGee	Senior	D	6' 0" (1.83 m)	180 lb (82 kg)	1999-03-12	Pearl River, New York	Shreveport Mudbugs (NAHL)	—
6	(Canada)	Charles-Alexis Legault	Freshman	D	6' 3" (1.91 m)	214 lb (97 kg)	2003-09-05	Kelowna, British Columbia	West Kelowna Warriors (BCHL)	—
8	(Canada)	Matthew Campbell	Freshman	D	6' 1" (1.85 m)	165 lb (75 kg)	2003-03-04	North Vancouver, British Columbia	Coquitlam Express (BCHL)	—
10	(Canada)	Ethan de Jong (A)	Graduate	F	5' 11" (1.8 m)	180 lb (82 kg)	1999-07-12	North Vancouver, British Columbia	Prince George Spruce Kings (BCHL)	—
11	(United States)	Collin Graf	Sophomore	F	6' 0" (1.83 m)	180 lb (82 kg)	2003-09-21	Lincoln, Massachusetts	Union (ECAC)	—
12	(Sweden)	Jacob Nordqvist	Graduate	D	5' 9" (1.75 m)	181 lb (82 kg)	1998-02-12	Gothenburg, Sweden	Lake Superior State (CCHA)	—
13	(Canada)	Christophe Fillion	Sophomore	F	5' 10" (1.78 m)	175 lb (79 kg)	2000-06-18	Sherbrooke, Quebec	Muskegon Lumberjacks (USHL)	—
14	(United States)	Victor Czerneckianair	Freshman	F	5' 10" (1.78 m)	166 lb (75 kg)	2002-02-17	Southington, Connecticut	Tri-City Storm (USHL)	—
15	(Canada)	Jayden Lee	Senior	D	5' 9" (1.75 m)	160 lb (73 kg)	2001-01-10	North Vancouver, British Columbia	Powell River Kings (BCHL)	—
16	(Canada)	Jacob Quillan	Sophomore	F	6' 0" (1.83 m)	195 lb (88 kg)	2002-02-02	Dartmouth, Nova Scotia	Penticton Vees (BCHL)	—
17	(United States)	Joey Cipollone	Senior	F	5' 11" (1.8 m)	185 lb (84 kg)	1999-07-12	Purchase, New York	Tri-City Storm (USHL)	—
18	(United States)	Anthony Cipollone	Freshman	F	5' 6" (1.68 m)	165 lb (75 kg)	2002-05-14	Purchase, New York	Brooks Bandits (AJHL)	—
19	(United States)	T. J. Friedmann	Graduate	F	6' 2" (1.88 m)	180 lb (82 kg)	1998-02-27	St. Louis, Missouri	Victoria Grizzlies (BCHL)	—
22	(United States)	Skyler Brind'Amour	Senior	F	6' 2" (1.88 m)	185 lb (84 kg)	1999-07-27	Raleigh, North Carolina	Chilliwack Chiefs (BCHL)	EDM, 177th overall 2017
23	(United States)	Zach Metsa (C)	Graduate	D	5' 9" (1.75 m)	180 lb (82 kg)	1998-10-19	Delafield, Wisconsin	Central Illinois Flying Aces (USHL)	—
24	(Canada)	Alex Power	Freshman	F	6' 1" (1.85 m)	185 lb (84 kg)	2002-01-04	St. John's, Newfoundland and Labrador	Bonnyville Pontiacs (AJHL)	—
26	(United States)	Timothy Heinke	Freshman	F	6' 1" (1.85 m)	210 lb (95 kg)	2001-10-02	Kensington, Connecticut	South Shore Kings (NCDC)	—
27	(Canada)	Desi Burgart (A)	Graduate	F	6' 1" (1.85 m)	185 lb (84 kg)	1998-09-28	North Vancouver, British Columbia	Surrey Eagles (BCHL)	—
28	(United States)	Sam Lipkin	Freshman	F	6' 3" (1.91 m)	192 lb (87 kg)	2003-01-03	Lafayette Hill, Pennsylvania	Chicago Steel (USHL)	ARI, 223rd overall 2021
29	(Canada)	Cristophe Tellier	Sophomore	F	6' 0" (1.83 m)	172 lb (78 kg)	2000-05-23	Sherbrooke, Quebec	Muskegon Lumberjacks (USHL)	—
31	(United States)	Noah Altman	Sophomore	G	6' 7" (2.01 m)	209 lb (95 kg)	2000-08-16	Los Angeles, California	Bismarck Bobcats (NAHL)	—
35	(United States)	Chase Clark	Freshman	G	6' 6" (1.98 m)	208 lb (94 kg)	2002-04-08	Williamsville, New York	Muskegon Lumberjacks (USHL)	WSH, 183rd overall 2021

== Standings ==
2022–23 ECAC Hockey Standings
	Conference record										Overall record					
	GP	W	L	T	OTW	OTL	SW	PTS	GF	GA	GP	W	L	T	GF	GA
#1 Quinnipiac †	22	20	2	0	0	0	0	60	87	30	41	34	4	3	162	64
#10 Harvard	22	18	4	0	5	0	0	49	86	48	34	24	8	2	125	81
#9 Cornell	22	15	6	1	0	1	0	47	78	42	34	21	11	2	112	66
St. Lawrence	22	12	10	0	1	2	0	37	56	58	36	17	19	0	88	102
#18 Colgate *	22	11	8	3	4	1	3	36	71	58	40	19	16	5	113	109
Clarkson	22	9	10	3	0	1	0	31	60	60	37	16	17	4	102	98
Rensselaer	22	9	13	0	2	1	0	26	52	74	35	14	20	1	84	115
Union	22	8	13	1	0	0	1	26	45	68	35	14	19	2	86	117
Princeton	22	8	14	0	2	1	0	26	57	73	32	13	19	0	89	112
Yale	22	6	14	2	0	1	1	22	35	62	32	8	20	4	57	94
Brown	22	5	14	3	0	1	1	20	41	69	30	9	18	3	65	91
Dartmouth	22	4	17	1	0	2	1	16	44	70	30	5	24	1	64	106
Championship: March 18, 2023 † indicates conference regular season champion (Cleary Cup) * indicates conference tournament champion (Whitelaw Cup); Rankings: USCHO.com Top 20 Poll

== Schedule and results ==
Date	Time	Opponent^{#}	Rank^{#}	Site	TV	Decision	Result	Attendance	Record
Exhibition
October 1	4:00 PM	Toronto*	#7	M&T Bank Arena • Hamden, Connecticut (Exhibition)	ESPN+	Perets	W 4–2	-	
October 2	2:00 PM	#15 Providence*	#7	M&T Bank Arena • Hamden, Connecticut (Exhibition)	ESPN+	Perets	W 4–2	-	
Regular Season
October 7	7:00 PM	at Boston College*	#6	Conte Forum • Chestnut Hill, Massachusetts	ESPN+	Perets	W 4–0	5,608	1–0–0
October 9	2:00 PM	Long Island*	#6	M&T Bank Arena • Hamden, Connecticut	ESPN+	Perets	T 2–2 ^{OT}	2,731	1–0–1
October 14	8:07 PM	at #3 North Dakota*	#8	Ralph Engelstad Arena • Grand Forks, North Dakota	Midco	Perets	T 5–5 ^{OT}	10,875	1–0–2
October 15	7:07 PM	at #3 North Dakota*	#8	Ralph Engelstad Arena • Grand Forks, North Dakota	Midco	Perets	W 6–2	11,680	2–0–2
October 22	4:00 PM	at Maine*	#3	Alfond Arena • Orono, Maine	ESPN+	Perets	L 0–4	3,776	2–1–2
October 23	4:00 PM	at Maine*	#3	Alfond Arena • Orono, Maine	ESPN+	Perets	W 6–2	2,915	3–1–2
November 4	7:00 PM	Colgate	#7	M&T Bank Arena • Hamden, Connecticut	ESPN+	Perets	W 3–2	2,714	4–1–2 (1–0–0)
November 5	7:00 PM	Cornell	#7	M&T Bank Arena • Hamden, Connecticut	ESPN+	Perets	W 2–0	3,439	5–1–2 (2–0–0)
November 11	7:00 PM	at Brown	#5	Meehan Auditorium • Providence, Rhode Island	ESPN+	Perets	W 4–3	712	6–1–2 (3–0–0)
November 12	7:00 PM	at Yale	#5	Ingalls Rink • New Haven, Connecticut (Rivalry)	ESPN+	Perets	W 4–0	2,501	7–1–2 (4–0–0)
November 18	7:00 PM	at Princeton	#5	Hobey Baker Memorial Rink • Princeton, New Jersey	ESPN+	Perets	W 4–1	2,103	8–1–2 (5–0–0)
November 19	7:00 PM	Princeton	#5	M&T Bank Arena • Hamden, Connecticut	ESPN+	Perets	W 4–1	2,633	9–1–2 (6–0–0)
Friendship Four
November 25	9:00 AM	vs. Dartmouth*	#4	SSE Arena Belfast • Belfast, Northern Ireland (Friendship Four Semifinal)		Perets	W 5–2	5,532	10–1–2
November 26	2:00 PM	vs. #17 Massachusetts*	#4	SSE Arena Belfast • Belfast, Northern Ireland (Friendship Four Championship)		Perets	T 2–2 ^{SOW}	5,893	10–1–3
Regular Season
December 2	7:00 PM	St. Lawrence	#2	M&T Bank Arena • Hamden, Connecticut	ESPN+	Perets	W 2–1	3,410	11–1–3 (7–0–0)
December 3	7:00 PM	Clarkson	#2	M&T Bank Arena • Hamden, Connecticut	ESPN+	Perets	W 6–3	3,129	12–1–3 (8–0–0)
December 9	7:00 PM	Rensselaer	#2	M&T Bank Arena • Hamden, Connecticut	ESPN+	Perets	W 8–3	2,921	13–1–3 (9–0–0)
December 10	7:00 PM	Union	#2	M&T Bank Arena • Hamden, Connecticut	ESPN+	Perets	W 8–1	2,877	14–1–3 (10–0–0)
December 30	7:00 PM	at Holy Cross*	#2	Hart Center • Worcester, Massachusetts	FloHockey	Perets	W 4–1	750	15–1–3
January 6	7:00 PM	Dartmouth	#2	M&T Bank Arena • Hamden, Connecticut	ESPN+	Perets	W 3–0	3,112	16–1–3 (11–0–0)
January 7	7:00 PM	#10 Harvard	#2	M&T Bank Arena • Hamden, Connecticut	ESPN+	Perets	W 4–1	3,523	17–1–3 (12–0–0)
January 14	7:00 PM	at Long Island*	#1	Northwell Health Ice Center • East Meadow, New York	ESPN+	Perets	W 5–2	1,100	18–1–3
January 20	7:00 PM	at #16 Cornell	#1	Lynah Rink • Ithaca, New York	ESPN+	Perets	L 0–4	3,794	18–2–3 (12–1–0)
January 21	7:00 PM	at Colgate	#1	Class of 1965 Arena • Hamilton, New York	ESPN+	Perets	L 2–3	1,001	18–3–3 (12–2–0)
Connecticut Hockey Tournament
January 28	7:00 PM	Sacred Heart*	#3	M&T Bank Arena • Hamden, Connecticut (Connecticut Ice Semifinal)		Perets	W 5–0	3,625	19–3–3
January 29	7:30 PM	#12 Connecticut*	#3	M&T Bank Arena • Hamden, Connecticut (Connecticut Ice Championship)		Perets	W 4–3	-	20–3–3
Regular Season
February 3	7:00 PM	at #8 Harvard	#2	Bright-Landry Hockey Center • Boston, Massachusetts	ESPN+	Perets	W 3–0	3,095	21–3–3 (13–2–0)
February 4	7:00 PM	at Dartmouth	#2	Thompson Arena • Hanover, New Hampshire	ESPN+	Perets	W 4–2	1,139	22–3–3 (14–2–0)
February 10	8:00 PM	at Clarkson	#2	Cheel Arena • Potsdam, New York	ESPN+	Perets	W 3–0	2,202	23–3–3 (15–2–0)
February 11	7:00 PM	at St. Lawrence	#2	Appleton Arena • Canton, New York	ESPN+	Perets	W 5–0	1,283	24–3–3 (16–2–0)
February 17	7:00 PM	Yale	#1	M&T Bank Arena • Hamden, Connecticut (Rivalry)	ESPN+	Perets	W 5–1	3,625	25–3–3 (17–2–0)
February 18	7:00 PM	Brown	#1	M&T Bank Arena • Hamden, Connecticut	ESPN+	Perets	W 5–2	3,367	26–3–3 (18–2–0)
February 24	7:00 PM	at Union	#2	Achilles Rink • Schenectady, New York	ESPN+	Perets	W 4–1	1,685	27–3–3 (19–2–0)
February 25	7:00 PM	at Rensselaer	#2	Houston Field House • Troy, New York	ESPN+	Perets	W 4–1	2,225	28–3–3 (20–2–0)
ECAC Hockey Tournament
March 10	7:00 PM	Yale*	#2	M&T Bank Arena • Hamden, Connecticut (Quarterfinal Game 1, Rivalry)	ESPN+	Perets	W 3–0	3,211	29–3–3
March 11	7:00 PM	Yale*	#2	M&T Bank Arena • Hamden, Connecticut (Quarterfinal Game 2, Rivalry)	ESPN+	Perets	W 6–2	3,178	30–3–3
March 17	4:00 PM	vs. Colgate*	#2	Herb Brooks Arena • Lake Placid, New York (Semifinal)	ESPN+	Perets	L 1–2 ^{2OT}	3,533	30–4–3
NCAA Tournament
March 24	5:30 PM	vs. #14 Merrimack*	#3	Total Mortgage Arena • Bridgeport, Connecticut (Northeast Regional Semifinal)	ESPNews	Perets	W 5–0	4,462	31–4–3
March 26	4:00 PM	vs. #8 Ohio State*	#3	Total Mortgage Arena • Bridgeport, Connecticut (Northeast Regional Final)	ESPN2	Perets	W 4–1	4,557	32–4–3
April 6	8:30 PM	vs. #2 Michigan*	#3	Amalie Arena • Tampa, Florida (National Semifinal)	ESPN2	Perets	W 5–2	19,119	33–4–3
April 8	8:00 PM	vs. #1 Minnesota*	#3	Amalie Arena • Tampa, Florida (National Championship)	ESPN2	Perets	W 3–2 ^{OT}	19,444	34–4–3
*Non-conference game. ^{#}Rankings from USCHO.com Poll. All times are in Eastern Time. Source:

== National championship game ==
April 8, 2023; 8:00 PM	(W1) Minnesota	2–3 (OT) (1–0, 1–1, 0–1, 0–1)	(NE1) Quinnipiac	Amalie Arena; Attendance: 19,444

Game reference
Referees: Joe Sullivan; Ryan Hersey; Linesmen: John Grandt; Tyler Liffrig

Scoring summary
Period	Team	Goal	Assist(s)	Time	Score
1st	MIN	John Mittelstadt (4)	Kurth	05:35	1–0 MIN
2nd	MIN	Jaxon Nelson (10)	Faber	25:24	2–0 MIN
2nd	QU	Cristophe Tellier (8)	Metsa	27:41	2–1 MIN
3rd	QU	Collin Graf (21) – EA	Metsa, Lipkin	57:13	2–2
1st Overtime	QU	Jacob Quillan (19) – GW	Lipkin, Metsa	60:10	3–2 QU
Penalty summary
Period	Team	Player	Penalty	Time	PIM
1st	QU	Skyler Brind'Amour	Contact to the Head	00:21	2:00
2nd	MIN	Jimmy Snuggerud	Tripping	32:32	2:00
3rd	QU	Skyler Brind'Amour	Hooking	43:17	2:00
3rd	MIN	Logan Cooley	High-sticking	55:08	2:00

Shots by period
Team	1	2	3	OT	T
Quinnipiac	4	11	14	1	30
Minnesota	7	6	2	0	15

Goaltenders
Team	Name	Saves	Goals against	Time on ice
QU	Yaniv Perets	13	2	59:29
MIN	Justen Close	27	3	60:10

== Scoring statistics ==
Name	Position	Games	Goals	Assists	Points	PIM
Collin Graf	C/RW	41	21	38	59	4
Sam Lipkin	C/LW	39	14	29	43	14
Ethan de Jong	RW	41	19	21	40	8
Jacob Quillan	C	41	19	19	38	12
Zach Metsa	D	40	9	28	37	12
Skyler Brind'Amour	C	41	14	18	32	27
T. J. Friedmann	F	41	11	11	22	22
Michael Lombardi	F	41	10	12	22	16
Cristophe Tellier	LW	37	8	14	22	6
Christophe Fillion	F	41	7	13	20	16
Jayden Lee	D	41	4	16	20	6
Jake Johnson	D	39	4	11	15	32
Ilvari Räsänen	D	41	2	13	15	12
Joey Cipollone	C	41	7	6	13	8
C. J. McGee	D	41	4	7	11	18
Jacob Nordqvist	D	38	0	11	11	20
Charles-Alexis Legault	D	40	2	7	9	22
Victor Czerneckianair	C	40	3	5	8	13
Desi Burgart	F	26	3	3	6	4
Anthony Cipollone	F	14	1	1	2	0
Timothy Heinke	RW	10	0	2	2	4
Yaniv Perets	G	41	0	2	2	2
Noah Altman	G	1	0	0	0	0
Alex Power	C	1	0	0	0	0
Chase Clark	G	9	0	0	0	0
Total			162	287	449	278

== Goaltending statistics ==
Name	Games	Minutes	Wins	Losses	Ties	Goals against	Saves	Shut outs	SV %	GAA
Noah Altman	1	1:50	0	0	0	0	2	0	1.000	0.00
Yaniv Perets	41	2416:35	34	4	3	60	807	10	.931	1.49
Chase Clark	8	78:29	0	0	0	4	21	0	.840	3.06
Empty Net	-	7:06	-	-	-	0	-	-	-	-
Total	41	2504:00	34	4	2	64	830	10	.928	1.53

== Rankings ==
Poll	Week																											
Poll	Pre	1	2	3	4	5	6	7	8	9	10	11	12	13	14	15	16	17	18	19	20	21	22	23	24	25	26	27 (Final)
USCHO.com	7	-	6 (1)	8	3 (3)	7	7	5	5	4	2 (14)	2 (12)	2 (15)	-	2 (10)	1 (40)	1 (39)	3 (2)	2 (4)	2 (6)	1 (26)	2 (25)	2 (13)	2 (12)	2 (12)	3 (4)	-	1 (50)
USA Today	7	7	7	7	3 (5)	6	6	5	4	4	4	3 (4)	3 (6)	3 (6)	3 (5)	1 (23)	1 (29)	4	2 (2)	2	1 (21)	2 (17)	2 (7)	2 (5)	2 (6)	3 (1)	3	1 (34)

Note: USCHO did not release a poll in weeks 1, 13, or 26.

== Awards and honors ==
Player	Award	Ref
Jacob Quillan	NCAA Tournament Most Outstanding Player	
Collin Graf	AHCA All-American East First Team	
Yaniv Perets	AHCA All-American East Second Team	
Zach Metsa	AHCA All-American East Second Team	
Skyler Brind’Amour	ECAC Hockey Best Defensive Forward	
Sam Lipkin	ECAC Hockey Rookie of the Year	
Yaniv Perets	Ken Dryden Award	
Rand Pecknold	Tim Taylor Award	
Yaniv Perets	ECAC Hockey First Team	
Collin Graf	ECAC Hockey First Team	
Zach Metsa	ECAC Hockey Second Team	
Ethan de Jong	ECAC Hockey Second Team	
Skyler Brind'Amour	ECAC Hockey Third Team	
Sam Lipkin	ECAC Hockey Rookie Team	
Zach Metsa	ECAC Hockey All-Tournament Team	
Yaniv Perets	NCAA All-Tournament Team	
Zach Metsa	NCAA All-Tournament Team	
Collin Graf	NCAA All-Tournament Team	
Jacob Quillan	NCAA All-Tournament Team	

== Players drafted into the NHL ==
=== 2023 NHL entry draft ===
Round	Pick	Player	NHL team
3	92	Christopher Pelosi ^{†}	Boston Bruins
5	139	Charles-Alexis Legault	Carolina Hurricanes

† incoming freshman
