= Friendship series =

Friendship Series may refer to:

- Friendship Series, a name suggested for the Summit Series by the Canadian Ministry of Foreign Affairs
- Friendship Series, the women's ice hockey equivalent of the Friendship Four
