= 2022–23 Yale Bulldogs men's ice hockey season =

College ice hockey season

- Conference: 10th ECAC Hockey
- Home ice: Ingalls Rink

Rankings
- USCHO: NR
- USA Today: NR

Record
- Overall: 8–20–4
- Conference: 6–14–2
- Home: 6–5–1
- Road: 2–12–3
- Neutral: 0–3–0

Coaches and captains
- Head coach: Keith Allain
- Assistant coaches: Joe Howe; Rob O'Gara; Bill Maniscalco
- Captain: Michael Young

The 2022–23 Yale Bulldogs Men's ice hockey season was the 127th season of play for the program and the 61st in the ECAC Hockey conference. The Bulldogs represented Yale University and were coached by Keith Allain, in his 16th season.

== Season ==
After a very poor year, particularly on the offense, Yale was hoping that 2023 would be better. Unfortunately, from the very beginning, it was apparent that the Bulldogs could not score. After winning their season-opener, the team lost the next 8 games. In that stretch the Elis averaged lest than 1 goal per game and were shutout in 4 consecutive matches.

The team saw marginal improvements after the winter break and went through a stretch of 5 games without a regulation loss. While the offense did score more often, the biggest factor in those wins was substituting in Luke Pearson as the team's starting goaltender. The sophomore received the lion's share of minutes in the second half of the season and helped Yale climb out of the conference cellar. Though the offense was paltry, averaging less than 2 goals a game for the season, Yale finished 10th in the ECAC and were set against a mediocre Rensselaer squad for the first round of the postseason.

Over the course of the year, the Elis had scored more than 3 goals in just 6 of their 29 games. Coincidentally, with a strong defensive effort, they were able to win each of those games. That trend continued in the playoffs as Yale's forwards showed up against the Engineers. The Bulldogs hit the back of the net 4 times and won their first playoff game in three years. In the quarterfinals, Yale was set against the #2 team in the nation, Quinnipiac. While the Elis weren't expected to win, the team didn't even bother to show up in the first game. While Pearson and the defense did well to limit the Bobcats to 3 goals on 30 shots, Yale was only able to muster 5 shots for the entire game. The Elis performed much better in the rematch, managing to score 2 goals, but were swept out of the postseasonby their supposed rivals.

== Departures ==
Player	Position	Nationality	Cause
Kyle Johnson	Forward	Canada	Graduation (signed with Bisons de Neuilly-sur-Marne)
Graham Lillibridge	Defenseman	United States	Graduation (retired)
Justin Pearson	Forward	United States	Graduate transfer to Connecticut

== Recruiting ==
Player	Position	Nationality	Age	Notes
Elan Bar-Lev-Wise	Forward	Canada	21	Vancouver, BC
David Chen	Forward	United States	19	Livingston, NJ
Bayard Hall	Defenseman	United States	20	Oldwick, NJ
Tucker Hartmann	Defenseman	United States	20	Southborough, MA
Jason Marsella	Defenseman	United States	19	Greenwich, CT
Kalen Szeto	Forward	Canada	19	Vancouver, BC
Jojo Tanaka-Campbell	Forward	Canada	21	Mill Bay, BC

== Roster ==
As of September 15, 2022.

No.	Nat.	Player	Class	Pos	Height	Weight	DoB	Hometown	Previous team	NHL rights
1	(United States)	Connor Hopkins	Senior	G	6' 1" (1.85 m)	200 lb (91 kg)	2000-03-09	Malden, Massachusetts	Tri-City Storm (USHL)	—
2	(United States)	Bayard Hall	Freshman	D	6' 1" (1.85 m)	176 lb (80 kg)	2002-08-16	Oldwick, New Jersey	Youngstown Phantoms (USHL)	—
3	(United States)	Michael Young (C)	Senior	D	6' 1" (1.85 m)	210 lb (95 kg)	1998-08-21	Medford, Massachusetts	Vernon Vipers (BCHL)	—
4	(United States)	Jason Marsella	Freshman	D	5' 11" (1.8 m)	193 lb (88 kg)	2002-11-20	Greenwich, Connecticut	Powell River Kings (BCHL)	—
5	(United States)	Dylan Herzog	Sophomore	D	6' 1" (1.85 m)	200 lb (91 kg)	2001-01-09	Auburn, Washington	Dubuque Fighting Saints (USHL)	—
6	(United States)	Connor Sullivan	Sophomore	D	5' 11" (1.8 m)	180 lb (82 kg)	2000-09-07	Plymouth, Massachusetts	Islanders Hockey Club (NCDC)	—
7	(United States)	Brandon Tabakin	Senior	D	5' 10" (1.78 m)	160 lb (73 kg)	2000-05-21	Woodbury, New York	Sioux Falls Stampede (USHL)	—
8	(Canada)	Ryan Conroy	Junior	D	5' 9" (1.75 m)	175 lb (79 kg)	2001-02-06	Chestermere, Alberta	Omaha Lancers (USHL)	—
9	(United States)	Henry Wagner	Junior	F	5' 9" (1.75 m)	170 lb (77 kg)	2001-05-11	St. Louis, Missouri	Connecticut Jr. Rangers (NCDC)	—
10	(United States)	Reilly Connors	Junior	F	6' 1" (1.85 m)	190 lb (86 kg)	2000-03-17	Madison, Connecticut	Connecticut Jr. Rangers (NCDC)	—
11	(United States)	Niklas Allain	Junior	F	6' 2" (1.88 m)	180 lb (82 kg)	1999-09-08	North Branford, Connecticut	Boston Junior Bruins (NCDC)	—
12	(Canada)	JoJo Tanaka-Campbell	Freshman	F	5' 11" (1.8 m)	185 lb (84 kg)	2001-01-11	Mill Bay, British Columbia	Vernon Vipers (BCHL)	—
13	(United States)	Ryan Carmichael	Senior	D	6' 3" (1.91 m)	200 lb (91 kg)	1999-03-03	Greenwich, Connecticut	Notre Dame (Big Ten)	—
14	(United States)	Ryan Stevens	Junior	F	6' 0" (1.83 m)	185 lb (84 kg)	2000-03-04	Duxbury, Massachusetts	South Shore Kings (NCDC)	—
15	(Canada)	Kalen Szeto	Freshman	F	5' 7" (1.7 m)	155 lb (70 kg)	2002-10-12	Vancouver, British Columbia	Victoria Grizzlies (BCHL)	—
16	(United States)	Teddy Wooding	Junior	F	6' 0" (1.83 m)	190 lb (86 kg)	1999-12-30	Wrentham, Massachusetts	Vernon Vipers (BCHL)	—
17	(United States)	William Dineen	Sophomore	F	6' 2" (1.88 m)	195 lb (88 kg)	2000-11-17	Lake George, New York	Sioux Falls Stampede (USHL)	—
18	(United States)	Tucker Hartmann	Freshman	D	5' 11" (1.8 m)	174 lb (79 kg)	2002-04-04	Southborough, Massachusetts	Salmon Arm Silverbacks (BCHL)	—
19	(Canada)	Quinton Ong	Senior	F	5' 10" (1.78 m)	175 lb (79 kg)	1999-07-23	Saskatoon, Saskatchewan	Canmore Eagles (AJHL)	—
21	(United States)	Briggs Gammill	Sophomore	F	5' 10" (1.78 m)	175 lb (79 kg)	2001-05-09	New Canaan, Connecticut	Connecticut Jr. Rangers (NCDC)	—
22	(United States)	Hayden Rowan	Senior	F	5' 9" (1.75 m)	200 lb (91 kg)	1999-01-22	Pemberville, Ohio	Trail Smoke Eaters (BCHL)	—
23	(United States)	Cole Donhauser	Senior	F	6' 0" (1.83 m)	190 lb (86 kg)	1999-12-27	Buffalo, New York	Chilliwack Chiefs (BCHL)	—
24	(United States)	David Chen	Freshman	F	6' 0" (1.83 m)	172 lb (78 kg)	2003-04-01	Livingston, New Jersey	Cedar Rapids RoughRiders (USHL)	—
25	(Canada)	Kieran O'Hearn	Sophomore	D	6' 3" (1.91 m)	200 lb (91 kg)	2000-05-13	North Delta, British Columbia	Surrey Eagles (BCHL)	—
26	(Canada)	Elan Bar-Lev-Wise	Freshman	F	6' 0" (1.83 m)	190 lb (86 kg)	2001-02-01	Vancouver, British Columbia	West Kelowna Warriors (BCHL)	—
27	(United States)	Ian Carpentier	Junior	F	6' 0" (1.83 m)	185 lb (84 kg)	2000-06-22	Worcester, Massachusetts	Boston Junior Bruins (NCDC)	—
30	(Canada)	Luke Pearson	Sophomore	G	6' 2" (1.88 m)	185 lb (84 kg)	2001-01-29	Whitby, Ontario	Alberni Valley Bulldogs (BCHL)	—
47	(United States)	Nathan Reid	Junior	G	6' 2" (1.88 m)	195 lb (88 kg)	2000-07-12	Madison, Wisconsin	Muskegon Lumberjacks (USHL)	—

== Standings ==
2022–23 ECAC Hockey Standings
	Conference record										Overall record					
	GP	W	L	T	OTW	OTL	SW	PTS	GF	GA	GP	W	L	T	GF	GA
#1 Quinnipiac †	22	20	2	0	0	0	0	60	87	30	41	34	4	3	162	64
#10 Harvard	22	18	4	0	5	0	0	49	86	48	34	24	8	2	125	81
#9 Cornell	22	15	6	1	0	1	0	47	78	42	34	21	11	2	112	66
St. Lawrence	22	12	10	0	1	2	0	37	56	58	36	17	19	0	88	102
#18 Colgate *	22	11	8	3	4	1	3	36	71	58	40	19	16	5	113	109
Clarkson	22	9	10	3	0	1	0	31	60	60	37	16	17	4	102	98
Rensselaer	22	9	13	0	2	1	0	26	52	74	35	14	20	1	84	115
Union	22	8	13	1	0	0	1	26	45	68	35	14	19	2	86	117
Princeton	22	8	14	0	2	1	0	26	57	73	32	13	19	0	89	112
Yale	22	6	14	2	0	1	1	22	35	62	32	8	20	4	57	94
Brown	22	5	14	3	0	1	1	20	41	69	30	9	18	3	65	91
Dartmouth	22	4	17	1	0	2	1	16	44	70	30	5	24	1	64	106
Championship: March 18, 2023 † indicates conference regular season champion (Cleary Cup) * indicates conference tournament champion (Whitelaw Cup); Rankings: USCHO.com Top 20 Poll

== Schedule and results ==
Date	Time	Opponent^{#}	Rank^{#}	Site	TV	Decision	Result	Attendance	Record
Regular Season
October 29	7:00 PM	Brown		Ingalls Rink • New Haven, Connecticut	ESPN+	Reid	W 2–0	1,300	1–0–0 (1–0–0)
October 30	4:00 PM	at Brown		Meehan Auditorium • Providence, Rhode Island	ESPN+	Reid	L 1–2	839	1–1–0 (1–1–0)
November 4	7:00 PM	at Dartmouth		Thompson Arena • Hanover, New Hampshire	ESPN+	Hopkins	L 0–6	1,162	1–2–0 (1–2–0)
November 5	7:00 PM	at #15 Harvard		Bright-Landry Hockey Center • Boston, Massachusetts (Rivalry)	ESPN+	Reid	L 0–4	2,239	1–3–0 (1–3–0)
November 11	7:00 PM	Princeton		Ingalls Rink • New Haven, Connecticut	ESPN+	Reid	L 0–3	2,100	1–4–0 (1–4–0)
November 12	7:00 PM	#5 Quinnipiac		Ingalls Rink • New Haven, Connecticut (Rivalry)	ESPN+	Reid	L 0–4	2,501	1–5–0 (1–5–0)
November 18	7:00 PM	at Cornell		Lynah Rink • Ithaca, New York	ESPN+	Hopkins	L 2–5	3,717	1–6–0 (1–6–0)
November 19	7:00 PM	at Colgate		Class of 1965 Arena • Hamilton, New York	ESPN+	Reid	L 1–8	803	1–7–0 (1–7–0)
November 27	4:00 PM	USNTDP*		Ingalls Rink • New Haven, Connecticut (Exhibition)	ESPN+	Reid	L 3–4 ^{OT}	-	
December 9	7:00 PM	at St. Lawrence		Appleton Arena • Canton, New York	ESPN+	Reid	L 1–2	1,121	1–8–0 (1–8–0)
December 10	7:00 PM	at Clarkson		Cheel Arena • Potsdam, New York	ESPN+	Pearson	T 1–1 ^{SOW}	2,662	1–8–1 (1–8–1)
Ledyard Bank Classic
December 30	4:00 PM	vs. #12 Providence*		Thompson Arena • Hanover, New Hampshire (Ledyard Bank Classic Semifinal)	ESPN+	Pearson	L 0–3	1,252	1–9–1
December 31	4:00 PM	at Dartmouth*		Thompson Arena • Hanover, New Hampshire (Ledyard Bank Classic Consolation)	ESPN+	Hopkins	L 3–4	1,584	1–10–1
January 2	7:30 PM	Army*		Ingalls Rink • New Haven, Connecticut	ESPN+	Pearson	W 5–1	1,200	2–10–1
January 6	7:00 PM	at #8 Merrimack*		J. Thom Lawler Rink • North Andover, Massachusetts	ESPN+	Pearson	T 3–3 ^{OT}	2,478	2–10–2
January 8	4:00 PM	at Vermont*		Gutterson Fieldhouse • Burlington, Vermont	ESPN+	Pearson	T 1–1 ^{OT}	2,328	2–10–3
January 13	7:00 PM	Rensselaer		Ingalls Rink • New Haven, Connecticut	ESPN+	Pearson	W 4–1	1,400	3–10–3 (2–8–1)
January 14	7:00 PM	Union		Ingalls Rink • New Haven, Connecticut	ESPN+	Pearson	T 0–0 ^{SOL}	1,700	3–10–4 (2–8–2)
January 20	7:00 PM	#9 Harvard		Ingalls Rink • New Haven, Connecticut (Rivalry)	ESPN+	Pearson	L 2–3 ^{OT}	3,200	3–11–4 (2–9–2)
January 21	7:00 PM	Dartmouth		Ingalls Rink • New Haven, Connecticut	ESPN+	Pearson	L 0–4	1,829	3–12–4 (2–10–2)
Connecticut Hockey Tournament
January 27	4:00 PM	vs. #12 Connecticut*		M&T Bank Arena • Hamden, Connecticut (Connecticut Ice Semifinal)		Pearson	L 1–6	3,625	3–13–4
January 28	4:00 PM	vs. Sacred Heart*		M&T Bank Arena • Hamden, Connecticut (Connecticut Ice Consolation)		Reid	L 3–4	-	3–14–4
February 3	7:00 PM	Clarkson		Ingalls Rink • New Haven, Connecticut	ESPN+	Pearson	W 4–0	1,426	4–14–4 (3–10–2)
February 4	7:00 PM	St. Lawrence		Ingalls Rink • New Haven, Connecticut	ESPN+	Pearson	W 4–0	1,451	5–14–4 (4–10–2)
February 10	7:00 PM	at Union		Achilles Rink • Schenectady, New York	ESPN+	Pearson	L 1–3	1,795	5–15–4 (4–11–2)
February 11	4:00 PM	at Rensselaer		Houston Field House • Troy, New York	ESPN+	Pearson	L 2–4	4,117	5–16–4 (4–12–2)
February 17	7:00 PM	at #1 Quinnipiac		M&T Bank Arena • Hamden, Connecticut (Rivalry)	ESPN+	Pearson	L 1–5	3,625	5–17–4 (4–13–2)
February 18	7:00 PM	at Princeton		Hobey Baker Memorial Rink • Princeton, New Jersey	ESPN+	Reid	W 4–0	2,218	6–17–4 (5–13–2)
February 24	7:00 PM	Colgate		Ingalls Rink • New Haven, Connecticut	ESPN+	Reid	W 4–2	1,421	7–17–4 (6–13–2)
February 25	7:00 PM	#13 Cornell		Ingalls Rink • New Haven, Connecticut	ESPN+	Hopkins	L 1–5	2,837	7–18–4 (6–14–2)
ECAC Hockey Tournament
March 4	7:00 PM	at Rensselaer*		Houston Field House • Troy, New York (First Round)	ESPN+	Pearson	W 4–1	1,556	8–18–4
March 10	7:00 PM	at #2 Quinnipiac*		M&T Bank Arena • Hamden, Connecticut (Quarterfinal Game 1, Rivalry)	ESPN+	Pearson	L 0–3	3,211	8–19–4
March 11	7:00 PM	at #2 Quinnipiac*		M&T Bank Arena • Hamden, Connecticut (Quarterfinal Game 2, Rivalry)	ESPN+	Pearson	L 2–6	3,178	8–20–4
*Non-conference game. ^{#}Rankings from USCHO.com Poll. All times are in Eastern Time. Source:

== Scoring statistics ==
Name	Position	Games	Goals	Assists	Points	PIM
Ian Carpentier	C	31	9	8	17	20
David Chen	C	32	8	7	15	10
Briggs Gammill	F	32	4	10	14	12
Cole Donhauser	F	27	6	7	13	32
Reilly Connors	F	31	7	5	12	26
Nik Allain	F	32	4	6	10	31
Connor Sullivan	D	31	4	5	9	26
Will Dineen	F	27	1	8	9	33
Quinton Ong	RW	27	4	2	6	6
Bayard Hall	D	23	2	4	6	0
Brandon Tabakin	D	29	2	4	6	2
Teddy Wooding	F	30	1	5	6	0
Ryan Conroy	D	32	1	5	6	28
Michael Young	D	29	0	5	5	25
Kalen Szeto	F	25	2	2	4	4
Kieran O'Hearn	D	31	0	4	4	24
Dylan Herzog	D	26	0	3	3	16
Henry Wagner	LW	29	0	3	3	12
Ryan Carmichael	D/F	31	2	0	2	12
Luke Pearson	G	19	0	1	1	0
Jason Marsella	G	1	0	0	0	0
JoJo Tanaka-Campbell	F	2	0	0	0	0
Tucker Hartmann	D	3	0	0	0	2
Connor Hopkins	G	5	0	0	0	0
Elan Bar-Lev-Wise	C	7	0	0	0	2
Ryan Stevens	F	7	0	0	0	2
Nathan Reid	G	13	0	0	0	0
Hayden Rowan	LW	23	0	0	0	21
Total			57	94	151	346

== Goaltending statistics ==
Name	Games	Minutes	Wins	Losses	Ties	Goals against	Saves	Shut outs	SV %	GAA
Luke Pearson	19	1114:05	5	9	4	45	504	3	.918	2.42
Nathan Reid	14	603:44	3	7	0	29	288	2	.909	2.88
Connor Hopkins	6	217:58	0	4	0	19	83	0	.814	5.23
Empty Net	-	8:53	-	-	-	1	-	-	-	-
Total	32	1944:40	8	20	4	94	875	5	.903	2.90

== Rankings ==
Poll	Week																											
Poll	Pre	1	2	3	4	5	6	7	8	9	10	11	12	13	14	15	16	17	18	19	20	21	22	23	24	25	26	27 (Final)
USCHO.com	NR	-	NR	NR	NR	NR	NR	NR	NR	NR	NR	NR	NR	-	NR	NR	NR	NR	NR	NR	NR	NR	NR	NR	NR	NR	-	NR
USA Today	NR	NR	NR	NR	NR	NR	NR	NR	NR	NR	NR	NR	NR	NR	NR	NR	NR	NR	NR	NR	NR	NR	NR	NR	NR	NR	NR	NR

Note: USCHO did not release a poll in weeks 1, 13, or 26.

== Players drafted into the NHL ==
=== 2023 NHL entry draft ===
Round	Pick	Player	NHL team
6	169	Rudy Guimond ^{†}	Detroit Red Wings

† incoming freshman
