= Whitney Avenue =

Highway in Connecticut, United States

Coordinates: 41°23′0.4″N 72°54′6.9″W

- Interactive map of Whitney Avenue
- Location: New Haven – Hamden

Construction
- Commissioned: 1798

Whitney Avenue is a principal arterial connecting Downtown New Haven with the town center of Hamden in the U.S. state of Connecticut. Most of the road within the city of New Haven is included in the Whitney Avenue Historic District, which is listed on the National Register of Historic Places. The designation begins at Grove Street in the northern part of Downtown New Haven and extends through the town of Hamden up to the Cheshire town line. North of Dixwell Avenue in Hamden Center, the road is a state highway and designated as part of Route 10. From the New Haven town line to Dixwell Avenue, the road is state-maintained with an unsigned designation of State Road 707. Within New Haven, Whitney Avenue is a town road. Connecticut Transit New Haven Routes 228 and 229, which connect New Haven to Hamden and Waterbury respectively, run along Whitney Avenue.

Whitney Avenue is named after Eli Whitney, Jr., whose factory was located by the Mill River near the road.

== History ==
The New Haven portion of Whitney Avenue "originated as an early road leading from central New Haven northward to Hartford. The Hartford and New Haven Turnpike Company improved it as a turnpike in 1798."

The Hamden portion of Whitney Avenue plus the extension in Cheshire and Southington was also a turnpike known as the Cheshire Turnpike, which was chartered in May 1800. It utilized the already developed Hartford and New Haven Turnpike alignment to reach Downtown New Haven.

The Whitney Armory was located off of Whitney Avenue in Hamden. One or more associated buildings, such as a dormitory, were located directly on the avenue.

Street railway tracks were present on Whitney Avenue from the late 19th century into the early 20th.

== Connecticut Route 10 ==
From the Cheshire, Connecticut Town Line to Dixwell Avenue in Hamden, Whitney Avenue is also Marked as Connecticut Route 10. Route 10 junctions up with Connecticut Route 40 and Connecticut Route 22 in Hamden. Route 10 portion of Whitney Avenue is home to many homes along with many businesses.

== Battle of Whitney Avenue ==
The Battle of Whitney Avenue commonly refers to the college ice hockey rivalry between the Quinnipiac Bobcats and the Yale Bulldogs of the ECAC hockey collegiate hockey conference. Whitney Avenue serves as the primary road between the main campuses of Quinnipiac University and Yale University.

The first meeting between the two teams was on January 8, 2006, after Quinnipiac joined the ECAC. Yale won by the score of 4–3. The teams have only met once in the NCAA Division I Men's Ice Hockey Tournament, in the championship game of the 2013 tournament, resulting in a 4–0 victory for Yale.

== Future Plans ==
The City of New Haven is currently working on the Whitney Avenue Improvements project, funded by the Connecticut Department of Transportation, to reconstruct Whitney Avenue from Trumbull Street to the Hamden town line. The project will reconfigure the existing 5-lane roadway into a 3-lane roadway via a road diet, with a dedicated on-street parking lane and a bidirectional protected cycletrack. The project will also include replacing all of the traffic signals along the corridor, pedestrian curb extensions at intersections, raised crosswalks, and repaving of the roadway.
