= 2022–23 Harvard Crimson men's ice hockey season =

College ice hockey season

NCAA Tournament, Regional Semifinal
- Conference: 2nd ECAC Hockey
- Home ice: Bright-Landry Hockey Center

Rankings
- USCHO: #10
- USA Today: #10

Record
- Overall: 24–8–2
- Conference: 16–4–0
- Home: 13–1–0
- Road: 9–5–1
- Neutral: 2–2–1

Coaches and captains
- Head coach: Ted Donato
- Assistant coaches: Jim Tortorella; James Marcou; Brian Robinson
- Captain(s): John Farinacci; Baker Shore; Henry Thrun

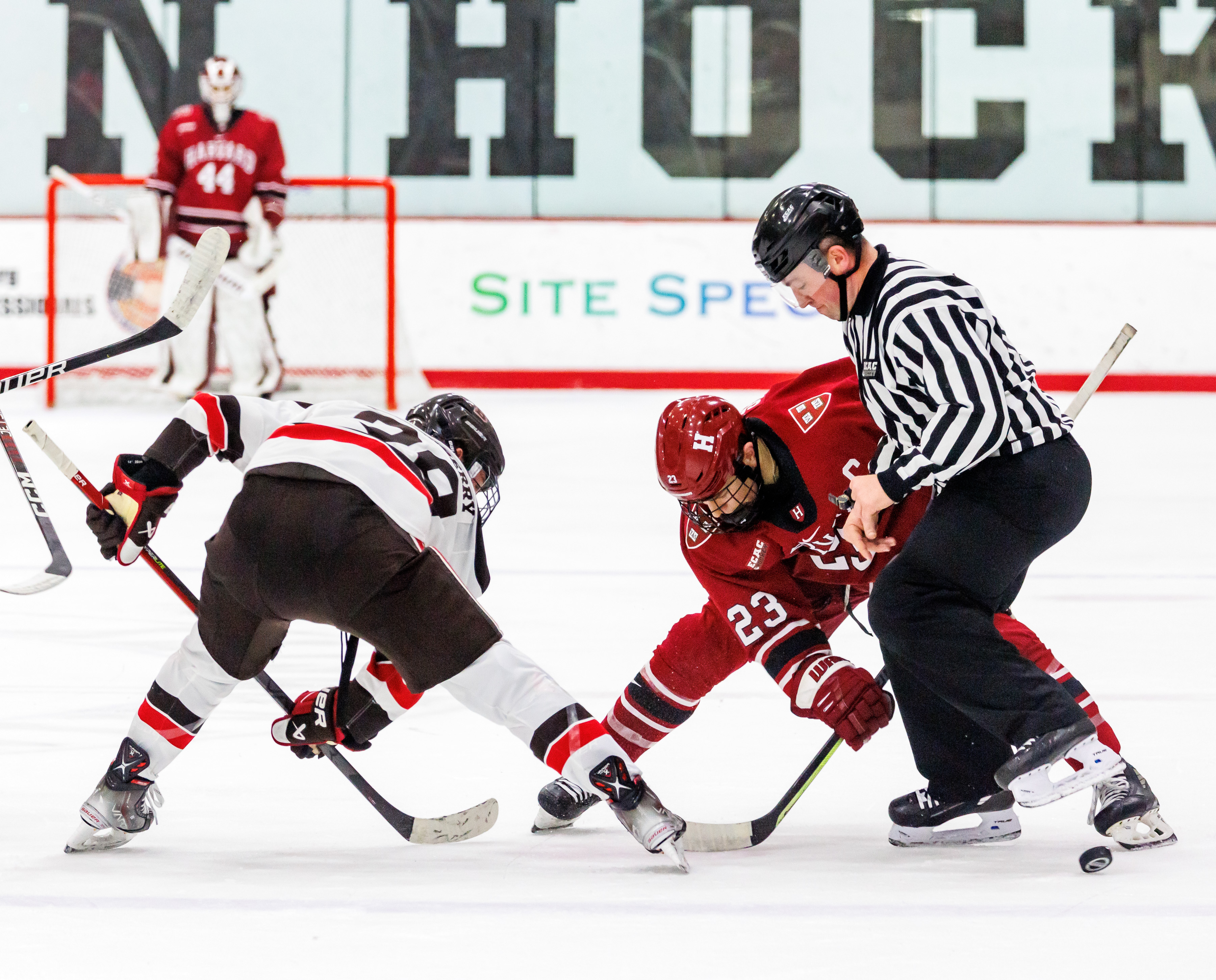
Jan 21: The Crimson faces off against the Bears at Meehan Auditorium

The 2022–23 Harvard Crimson Men's ice hockey season was the 122nd season of play for the program and 61st in ECAC Hockey. The Crimson represented Harvard University in the 2022–23 NCAA Division I men's ice hockey season, were coached by Ted Donato in his 18th season, and played their home games at Bright-Landry Hockey Center.

== Season ==
Harvard entered the season in a curious position as the team had more players on its roster who had been drafted by NHL teams than any other college. The team placed on the national radar and had the team sitting 11th in both preseason polls.

Once their season got underway, Harvard looked to be exceeding any predictions when the team started out 7–0. The offense, led by Olympian Sean Farrell, was firing on all cylinders while the defensive effort was being spearheaded by All-American Henry Thrun. In goal the team was a little less certain, rotating between three different netminders early in the year. coach Donato eventually settled on senior Mitchell Gibson but also had a capable backup in Derek Mullahy. The team ran into a bit of a speed bump on its first real road trip, dropping a weekend to Michigan, and then bookended its winter break with a pair of splits.

The losses caused Harvard's ranking to slip a bit but it was still a top-10 team and in a guaranteed tournament position when the Crimson began the second half of its season. Harvard was well positioned to make a run for a regular season title, however, losing both matches to league-leading Quinnipiac ended that hope. In spite of that disappointment, Harvard was still heading for a 2nd-place finish when they paused their conference slate for the Beanpot in early February. With seconds remaining in overtime, the Crimson knocked off Boston College and advanced to their first title game in 6 years. For the first time in the 70-year history of the event, neither BC nor BU made the final Harvard was met by Northeastern. The two teams fought a close game with the Huskies taking a lead in the second before a pair of goals from Matthew Coronato staked Harvard to a lead. NU tied the game early in the third and both teams battled to get the next goal. The game headed into overtime and, after a 5-minute 3-on-3, was sent to a shootout. Because the NCAA had denied the Beanpot's waiver to continue using playoff overtime rules in 2021, this was the first time the tournament had ended with a shootout. Unfortunately for Harvard, Devon Levi stopped every Crimson shot and won the championship for Northeastern.

Harvard swept the rest of its schedule to end the regular season #7 in the polls and, more importantly, well inside the top ten for the PairWise rankings. With their lofty position, Harvard was guaranteed to make the NCAA tournament no matter what happened in the conference postseason but that didn't stop the Crimson from trying to repeat as league champions. The Crimson began their run with a pair of dominating performances against Princeton with the team succeeding in all phases of the game. Their semifinal match with Cornell proved to a much tougher challenge as the two rivals fought a defensive struggle that resulted in 0 goals during regulation. Harvard continued to plug away in overtime and Alex Laferriere's 21st goal of the year sent the Crimson to the title game. Despite being a heavy favorite over Colgate, Harvard found themselves down by a pair goin into the second period. Henry Thrun cut the lead in half but the Raiders regained the 2-goal edge just a few minutes later. In the third, Coronato's 20th on the power play put the Crimson back within a goal but that was all they could get and Harvard lost out on the championship.

The defeat caused Harvard to drop in the rankings slightly but it still left them with a #2 seed for the NCAA tournament. They were placed opposite Ohio State, who had been hit-or-miss over the previous few months, and were the favorites to win the game. However, once the puck dropped, nothing went right for the Crimson. Even with 15 NHL draft picks, Harvard's offense was unable to get anything going and managed just 3 shots in the first period. The defense, meanwhile, was under constant attack from the Buckeyes. Gibson did well to limit the damage to 2 goals after 20 minutes and kept his team in the game. While they needed a complete change in the second, all Harvard got was more of the same. The Crimson was outshot 5–17 and the withering attack was too much for Gibson. Ohio State broke through with 5 goals in the middle frame while Harvard was still scoreless. With the game essentially over, Ohio State relented on their pressure and were content to play defense for the final 20 minutes. The extra room gave Harvard the chance to actually generate some chances but, with the game's outcome already decided, that was only for pride. John Farinacci finally got Harvard on the board with under 4 minutes to play and avoid a historical loss but that was about the only silver lining in an otherwise terribly cloudy game.

== Departures ==
Player	Position	Nationality	Cause
Nick Abruzzese	Forward	United States	Signed professional contract (Toronto Maple Leafs)
Jack Donato	Forward	United States	Graduation (retired)
Casey Dornbach	Forward	United States	Graduate transfer to Denver
John Fusco	Defenseman	United States	Transferred to Dartmouth
R. J. Murphy	Forward	United States	Graduation (retired)
John Murray	Defenseman	United States	Left program (retired)
Marshall Rifai	Defenseman	Canada	Graduation (signed with Toronto Marlies)
Derek Schaedig	Goaltender	United States	Graduation (retired)

== Recruiting ==
Player	Position	Nationality	Age	Notes
Ryan Healey	Defenseman	United States	18	Chicago, IL; selected 121st overall in 2022
Marek Hejduk	Forward	United States	18	Parker, CO
Aku Koskenvuo	Goaltender	Finland	19	Espoo, FIN; selected 137th overall in 2021
Mason Langenbrunner	Defenseman	United States	20	Dallas, TX; selected 151st overall in 2020
Joe Miller	Forward	United States	20	Minneapolis, MN; selected 180th overall in 2020
Casey Severo	Forward	United States	21	Pittsford, NY
Philip Tresca	Forward	United States	20	Boston, MA

== Roster ==
No.	Nat.	Player	Class	Pos	Height	Weight	DoB	Hometown	Previous team	NHL rights
1	(United States)	Max Miller	Junior	G	6' 2" (1.88 m)	180 lb (82 kg)	2001-08-02	Ann Arbor, Michigan	Janesville Jets (NAHL)	—
2	(United States)	Ian Moore	Sophomore	D	6' 3" (1.91 m)	185 lb (84 kg)	2002-01-04	Concord, Massachusetts	Chicago Steel (USHL)	ANA, 67th overall 2020
3	(United States)	Henry Thrun (C)	Senior	D	6' 2" (1.88 m)	195 lb (88 kg)	2001-03-12	Southborough, Massachusetts	Dubuque Fighting Saints (USHL)	ANA, 101st overall 2019
5	(United States)	Mason Langenbrunner	Freshman	D	6' 3" (1.91 m)	179 lb (81 kg)	2002-09-14	Eden Prairie, Minnesota	Fargo Force (USHL)	BOS, 151st overall 2020
7	(United States)	Philip Tresca	Freshman	F	6' 0" (1.83 m)	190 lb (86 kg)	2002-04-10	Newton, Massachusetts	Muskegon Lumberjacks (USHL)	—
8	(United States)	Alex Gaffney	Sophomore	F	5' 8" (1.73 m)	170 lb (77 kg)	2002-06-25	West Orange, New Jersey	Waterloo Black Hawks (USHL)	—
9	(United States)	Ryan Healey	Freshman	D	6' 0" (1.83 m)	172 lb (78 kg)	2004-05-19	Hull, Massachusetts	Sioux Falls Stampede (USHL)	MIN, 121st overall 2022
12	(United States)	Joe Miller	Freshman	F	5' 8" (1.73 m)	147 lb (67 kg)	2002-09-15	Minneapolis, Minnesota	Chicago Steel (USHL)	TOR, 180th overall 2020
13	(United States)	Marek Hejduk	Freshman	F	6' 0" (1.83 m)	184 lb (83 kg)	2004-01-03	Parker, Colorado	USNTDP (USHL)	—
14	(United States)	Jace Foskey	Senior	D	6' 2" (1.88 m)	195 lb (88 kg)	2000-06-01	Southlake, Texas	Lone Star Brahmas (NAHL)	—
15	(United States)	Luke Khozozian	Sophomore	F	5' 10" (1.78 m)	180 lb (82 kg)	2001-04-21	Weston, Massachusetts	East Coast Wizards (EHL)	—
17	(United States)	John Farinacci (C)	Senior	F	6' 0" (1.83 m)	185 lb (84 kg)	2001-02-14	Red Bank, New Jersey	Muskegon Lumberjacks (USHL)	ARI, 76th overall 2019
18	(United States)	Alex Laferriere	Junior	F	6' 0" (1.83 m)	178 lb (81 kg)	2001-10-28	Chatham, New Jersey	Des Moines Buccaneers (USHL)	LAK, 83rd overall 2020
19	(United States)	Matthew Coronato	Sophomore	F	5' 10" (1.78 m)	185 lb (84 kg)	2002-11-14	Greenlawn, New York	Chicago Steel (USHL)	CGY, 13th overall 2021
20	(United States)	Tommy Lyons	Sophomore	F	6' 0" (1.83 m)	185 lb (84 kg)	2000-04-01	East Falmouth, Massachusetts	Chilliwack Chiefs (BCHL)	—
21	(United States)	Sean Farrell	Junior	F	5' 9" (1.75 m)	175 lb (79 kg)	2001-11-02	Hopkinton, Massachusetts	Chicago Steel (USHL)	MTL, 124th overall 2020
22	(United States)	Ryan Siedem	Senior	D	6' 2" (1.88 m)	192 lb (87 kg)	2001-02-25	Madison, New Jersey	Fargo Force (USHL)	—
23	(United States)	Baker Shore (C)	Senior	F	5' 11" (1.8 m)	180 lb (82 kg)	1999-08-20	Englewood, Colorado	Chicago Steel (USHL)	—
24	(Canada)	Jack Bar	Sophomore	D	6' 2" (1.88 m)	195 lb (88 kg)	2002-10-24	Newmarket, Ontario	Chicago Steel (USHL)	DAL, 138th overall 2021
26	(United States)	Ryan Drkulec	Junior	F	6' 6" (1.98 m)	197 lb (89 kg)	2000-09-22	Mansfield, Texas	Lone Star Brahmas (NAHL)	—
27	(Canada)	Austin Wong	Senior	F	5' 11" (1.8 m)	190 lb (86 kg)	2000-08-26	Calgary, Alberta	Fargo Force (USHL)	WPG, 215th overall 2018
29	(United States)	Casey Severo	Freshman	F	5' 9" (1.75 m)	177 lb (80 kg)	2001-02-01	Penfield, New York	Madison Capitols (USHL)	—
30	(Finland)	Aku Koskenvuo	Freshman	G	6' 4" (1.93 m)	173 lb (78 kg)	2003-02-26	Espoo, Finland	HIFK U20 (U20 SM-sarja)	VAN, 137th overall 2021
33	(Canada)	Kyle Aucoin	Sophomore	D	6' 0" (1.83 m)	175 lb (79 kg)	2002-07-02	Ottawa, Ontario	Muskegon Lumberjacks (USHL)	DET, 156th overall 2020
35	(United States)	Derek Mullahy	Junior	G	6' 0" (1.83 m)	175 lb (79 kg)	2001-03-20	Scituate, Massachusetts	Des Moines Buccaneers (USHL)	—
43	(United States)	Christian Jimenez	Sophomore	D	5' 9" (1.75 m)	195 lb (88 kg)	2002-03-15	Yorktown Heights, New York	Sioux City Musketeers (USHL)	—
44	(United States)	Mitchell Gibson	Senior	G	6' 1" (1.85 m)	187 lb (85 kg)	1999-06-25	Phoenixville, Pennsylvania	Central Illinois Flying Aces (USHL)	WSH, 124th overall 2018
59	(United States)	Zakary Karpa	Sophomore	F	6' 2" (1.88 m)	190 lb (86 kg)	2002-03-25	Newport Beach, California	Des Moines Buccaneers (USHL)	NYR, 191st overall 2022
96	(Canada)	Wyllum Deveaux	Senior	F	6' 2" (1.88 m)	205 lb (93 kg)	2000-08-30	Sackville, Nova Scotia	Des Moines Buccaneers (USHL)	—

== Standings ==
2022–23 ECAC Hockey Standings
	Conference record										Overall record					
	GP	W	L	T	OTW	OTL	SW	PTS	GF	GA	GP	W	L	T	GF	GA
#1 Quinnipiac †	22	20	2	0	0	0	0	60	87	30	41	34	4	3	162	64
#10 Harvard	22	18	4	0	5	0	0	49	86	48	34	24	8	2	125	81
#9 Cornell	22	15	6	1	0	1	0	47	78	42	34	21	11	2	112	66
St. Lawrence	22	12	10	0	1	2	0	37	56	58	36	17	19	0	88	102
#18 Colgate *	22	11	8	3	4	1	3	36	71	58	40	19	16	5	113	109
Clarkson	22	9	10	3	0	1	0	31	60	60	37	16	17	4	102	98
Rensselaer	22	9	13	0	2	1	0	26	52	74	35	14	20	1	84	115
Union	22	8	13	1	0	0	1	26	45	68	35	14	19	2	86	117
Princeton	22	8	14	0	2	1	0	26	57	73	32	13	19	0	89	112
Yale	22	6	14	2	0	1	1	22	35	62	32	8	20	4	57	94
Brown	22	5	14	3	0	1	1	20	41	69	30	9	18	3	65	91
Dartmouth	22	4	17	1	0	2	1	16	44	70	30	5	24	1	64	106
Championship: March 18, 2023 † indicates conference regular season champion (Cleary Cup) * indicates conference tournament champion (Whitelaw Cup); Rankings: USCHO.com Top 20 Poll

== Schedule and results ==
Date	Time	Opponent^{#}	Rank^{#}	Site	TV	Decision	Result	Attendance	Record
Exhibition
October 22	7:00 PM	Guelph*	#15	Bright-Landry Hockey Center • Boston, Massachusetts (Exhibition)	ESPN+	Koskenvuo	W 9–0	230	
Regular Season
October 28	7:00 PM	Dartmouth	#14	Bright-Landry Hockey Center • Boston, Massachusetts	ESPN+	Gibson	W 5–2	2,276	1–0–0 (1–0–0)
October 29	7:00 PM	Princeton	#14	Bright-Landry Hockey Center • Boston, Massachusetts	NESN, ESPN+	Mullahy	W 4–2	1,508	2–0–0 (2–0–0)
November 4	7:00 PM	Brown	#15	Bright-Landry Hockey Center • Boston, Massachusetts	ESPN+	Koskenvuo	W 5–2	1,579	3–0–0 (3–0–0)
November 5	7:00 PM	Yale	#15	Bright-Landry Hockey Center • Boston, Massachusetts (Rivalry)	ESPN+	Gibson	W 4–0	2,239	4–0–0 (4–0–0)
November 11	7:00 PM	at Rensselaer	#13	Houston Field House • Troy, New York	ESPN+	Gibson	W 3–2	2,425	5–0–0 (5–0–0)
November 12	7:00 PM	at Union	#13	Achilles Rink • Schenectady, New York	ESPN+	Mullahy	W 5–1	1,793	6–0–0 (6–0–0)
November 15	7:00 PM	at New Hampshire*	#10	Whittemore Center • Durham, New Hampshire	ESPN+	Gibson	W 3–1	2,812	7–0–0
November 25	7:00 PM	at #5 Michigan*	#9	Yost Ice Arena • Ann Arbor, Michigan	BTN+	Gibson	T 4–4 ^{OT}	5,800	7–0–1
November 26	7:00 PM	at #5 Michigan*	#9	Yost Ice Arena • Ann Arbor, Michigan	BTN+	Gibson	L 1–4	5,800	7–1–1
December 2	7:00 PM	at Cornell	#7	Lynah Rink • Ithaca, New York (Rivalry)	ESPN+	Gibson	W 2–1	4,267	8–1–1 (7–0–0)
December 3	7:00 PM	at Colgate	#7	Class of 1965 Arena • Hamilton, New York	ESPN+	Koskenvuo	L 4–6	1,088	8–2–1 (7–1–0)
December 30	7:00 PM	at #8 Boston University*	#9	Walter Brown Arena • Boston, Massachusetts	ESPN2	Gibson	L 1–2 ^{OT}	3,277	8–3–1
January 1	4:00 PM	Northeastern*	#9	Bright-Landry Hockey Center • Boston, Massachusetts	ESPN+	Gibson	W 8–4	3,095	9–3–1
January 6	7:00 PM	at Princeton	#10	Hobey Baker Memorial Rink • Princeton, New Jersey	ESPN+	Gibson	W 4–3 ^{OT}	2,300	10–3–1 (8–1–0)
January 7	7:00 PM	at #2 Quinnipiac	#10	M&T Bank Arena • Hamden, Connecticut	ESPN+	Gibson	L 1–4	3,523	10–4–1 (8–2–0)
January 13	7:00 PM	Clarkson	#9	Bright-Landry Hockey Center • Boston, Massachusetts	ESPN+	Mullahy	W 4–1	3,095	11–4–1 (9–2–0)
January 14	7:00 PM	St. Lawrence	#9	Bright-Landry Hockey Center • Boston, Massachusetts	NESN+, ESPN+	Mullahy	W 5–0	3,095	12–4–1 (10–2–0)
January 20	7:00 PM	at Yale	#9	Ingalls Rink • New Haven, Connecticut (Rivalry)	ESPN+	Gibson	W 3–2 ^{OT}	3,200	13–4–1 (11–2–0)
January 21	7:00 PM	at Brown	#9	Meehan Auditorium • Providence, Rhode Island	ESPN+	Gibson	L 2–3	823	13–5–1 (11–3–0)
January 27	7:00 PM	Colgate	#10	Bright-Landry Hockey Center • Boston, Massachusetts	ESPN+	Mullahy	W 5–4 ^{OT}	2,152	14–5–1 (12–3–0)
January 28	5:00 PM	#11 Cornell	#10	Bright-Landry Hockey Center • Boston, Massachusetts (Rivalry)	ESPN+	Gibson	W 6–2	3,095	15–5–1 (13–3–0)
February 3	8:00 PM	#2 Quinnipiac	#8	Bright-Landry Hockey Center • Boston, Massachusetts	ESPN+	Gibson	L 0–3	3,095	15–6–1 (13–4–0)
Beanpot
February 6	5:00 PM	vs. Boston College*	#10	TD Garden • Boston, Massachusetts (Beanpot Semifinal)	NESN	Gibson	W 4–3	18,258	16–6–1
February 10	8:00 PM	at Dartmouth	#10	Thompson Arena • Hanover, New Hampshire	ESPN+	Gibson	W 6–3	1,642	17–6–1 (14–4–0)
February 13	7:30 PM	vs. #16 Northeastern*	#9	TD Garden • Boston, Massachusetts (Beanpot Championship)	NESN	Gibson	T 2–2 ^{SOL}	18,258	17–6–2
February 17	7:00 PM	Union	#9	Bright-Landry Hockey Center • Boston, Massachusetts	ESPN+	Gibson	W 5–3	2,172	18–6–2 (15–4–0)
February 18	7:00 PM	Rensselaer	#9	Bright-Landry Hockey Center • Boston, Massachusetts	ESPN+	Gibson	W 4–0	3,095	19–6–2 (16–4–0)
February 24	7:00 PM	at St. Lawrence	#7	Appleton Arena • Canton, New York	ESPN+	Gibson	W 6–2	1,352	20–6–2 (17–4–0)
February 25	7:00 PM	at Clarkson	#7	Cheel Arena • Potsdam, New York	ESPN+	Gibson	W 3–2	2,566	21–6–2 (18–4–0)
ECAC Hockey Tournament
March 10	7:00 PM	Princeton*	#6	Bright-Landry Hockey Center • Boston, Massachusetts (Quarterfinal Game 1)	ESPN+	Gibson	W 6–1	1,671	22–6–2
March 11	7:00 PM	Princeton*	#6	Bright-Landry Hockey Center • Boston, Massachusetts (Quarterfinal Game 2)	ESPN+	Gibson	W 6–1	1,640	23–6–2
March 12	7:30 PM	vs. #10 Cornell*	#6	Herb Brooks Arena • Lake Placid, New York (Semifinal, Rivalry)	ESPN+	Gibson	W 1–0 ^{OT}	3,533	24–6–2
March 12	7:30 PM	vs. Colgate*	#6	Herb Brooks Arena • Lake Placid, New York (Championship)	ESPN+	Gibson	L 2–3	3,839	24–7–2
NCAA Tournament
March 24	2:00 PM	vs. #8 Ohio State*	#7	Total Mortgage Arena • Bridgeport, Connecticut (Northeast Regional Semifinal)	ESPNU	Gibson	L 1–8	4,462	24–8–2
*Non-conference game. ^{#}Rankings from USCHO.com Poll. All times are in Eastern Time. Source:

== Scoring statistics ==
Name	Position	Games	Goals	Assists	Points	PIM
Sean Farrell	C/LW	34	20	33	53	12
Alex Laferriere	RW	34	21	21	42	20
Matthew Coronato	LW/RW	34	20	16	36	14
Henry Thrun	D	33	7	24	31	14
Joe Miller	F	33	13	15	28	6
John Farinacci	C	19	5	15	20	2
Ian Moore	D	34	1	18	19	12
Ryan Siedem	D	34	1	16	17	21
Alex Gaffney	C	33	7	9	16	4
Marek Hejduk	F	34	6	7	13	14
Baker Shore	RW	34	4	9	13	14
Zakary Karpa	C	22	5	3	8	6
Philip Tresca	C	34	4	4	8	20
Casey Severo	C	27	2	6	8	2
Ryan Healey	D	34	2	6	8	23
Ryan Drkulec	F	14	4	1	5	8
Jack Bar	D	32	1	4	5	31
Kyle Aucoin	D	24	0	2	2	4
Austin Wong	C	30	1	0	1	28
Mason Langenbrunner	D	33	1	0	1	22
Derek Mullahy	G	6	0	1	1	0
Jace Foskey	D	8	0	1	1	0
Wyllum Deveaux	F	25	0	1	1	2
Aku Koskenvuo	G	2	0	0	0	0
Christian Jimenez	D	6	0	0	0	2
Mitchell Gibson	G	27	0	0	0	0
Total			125	212	337	281

== Goaltending statistics ==
Name	Games	Minutes	Wins	Losses	Ties	Goals against	Saves	Shut outs	SV %	GAA
Derek Mullahy	7	317:40	5	0	0	9	117	1	.929	1.70
Mitchell Gibson	27	1628:02	18	7	2	61	694	3	.919	2.25
Aku Koskenvuo	3	117:52	1	1	0	7	49	0	.875	3.56
Empty Net	-	16:42	-	-	-	4	-	-	-	-
Total	34	2080:16	24	8	2	81	860	4	.914	2.34

== Rankings ==
Poll	Week																											
Poll	Pre	1	2	3	4	5	6	7	8	9	10	11	12	13	14	15	16	17	18	19	20	21	22	23	24	25	26	27 (Final)
USCHO.com	11	-	12	12	15	14	15	13	10	9	7	9	9	-	10	9	9	10	8	10	9	7	5	6	6	7	-	10
USA Today	11	11	10	12	15	13т	15	12	11	9	9	9	9	9	9	9	9	10	8	10	10	9	5	5	6	7	10	10

Note: USCHO did not release a poll in weeks 1, 13, or 26.

== Awards and honors ==
Player	Award	Ref
Henry Thrun	AHCA All-American East First Team	
Sean Farrell	AHCA All-American East First Team	
Matthew Coronato	AHCA All-American East Second Team	
Sean Farrell	ECAC Hockey Player of the Year	
Henry Thrun	ECAC Hockey Best Defensive Defenseman	
Henry Thrun	ECAC Hockey First Team	
Sean Farrell	ECAC Hockey First Team	
Mitchell Gibson	ECAC Hockey Second Team	
Matthew Coronato	ECAC Hockey Second Team	
Alex Laferriere	ECAC Hockey Second Team	
Ryan Healey	ECAC Hockey Rookie Team	
Joe Miller	ECAC Hockey Rookie Team	
Henry Thrun	ECAC Hockey All-Tournament Team	
Alex Laferriere	ECAC Hockey All-Tournament Team	

== Players drafted into the NHL ==
=== 2023 NHL entry draft ===
Round	Pick	Player	NHL team
6	173	Sean Keohane ^{†}	Buffalo Sabres

† incoming freshman
