= Connecticut Ice =

Annual ice hockey event in Connecticut, US

Tournament information
- Sport: College ice hockey
- Location: Connecticut
- Established: 2020
- Number of tournaments: 6
- Format: Single-elimination
- Venue: Webster Bank Arena (2020–2022); Home sites (2023–)
- Teams: 4

Current champion
- UConn

Connecticut Ice is an annual ice hockey event celebrating the tradition and progress of youth and amateur hockey in the state of Connecticut. The three-day event is headlined by a four-team tournament with participation from all of the state's four Division I programs: Connecticut, Quinnipiac, Sacred Heart and Yale.

== History ==
After years of organization, the first event was finally arranged for late January in 2020. In addition to the collegiate tournament, the three-day event includes youth tournaments from various levels of junior ice hockey.

SportsNet New York agreed to broadcast all four games of the tournament.

In 2021, in what was supposed to be the second edition of the tournament, the event was cancelled due to the COVID-19 pandemic. Among other problems, the virus had led Yale to cancel its entire season.

After returning in 2022, the tournament ended its arrangement with the Webster Bank Arena and was played at the M&T Bank Arena, the home venue for Quinnipiac. As a result, SNY decided against broadcasting the tournament, which was renamed as the 'Connecticut Hockey Tournament'. After the season, the series reverted to being called 'Connecticut Ice' and a new arrangement was made to hold the series at the XL Center in Hartford, Connecticut for 2024. SNY agreed to resume broadcasting the series which was also renewed until at least 2026.

== Yearly results ==
Season	Champion	Runner-up	Third place	Fourth place	Venue	Ref
2020	Sacred Heart	Quinnipiac	Yale	Connecticut	Webster Bank Arena, Bridgeport, Connecticut	
2022	Quinnipiac	Connecticut	Sacred Heart	Yale	Webster Bank Arena, Bridgeport, Connecticut	
2023	Quinnipiac	Connecticut	Sacred Heart	Yale	M&T Bank Arena, Hamden, Connecticut	
2024	Quinnipiac	Connecticut	Yale	Sacred Heart	XL Center, Hartford, Connecticut	
2025	Connecticut	Sacred Heart	Quinnipiac	Yale	Martire Family Arena, Fairfield, Connecticut	
2026	Connecticut	Quinnipiac	Sacred Heart	Yale	Ingalls Rink, New Haven, Connecticut	

== MVPs ==
Year	Player	Team	Pos.
2025	Tyler Muszelik	UConn	G
2022	Yaniv Perets	Quinnipiac	G

== Team records ==
Team	Titles	Conference
Quinnipiac	2022, 2023, 2024	ECAC
Connecticut	2025, 2026	Hockey East
Sacred Heart	2020	AHA
