= 2022–23 Clarkson Golden Knights men's ice hockey season =

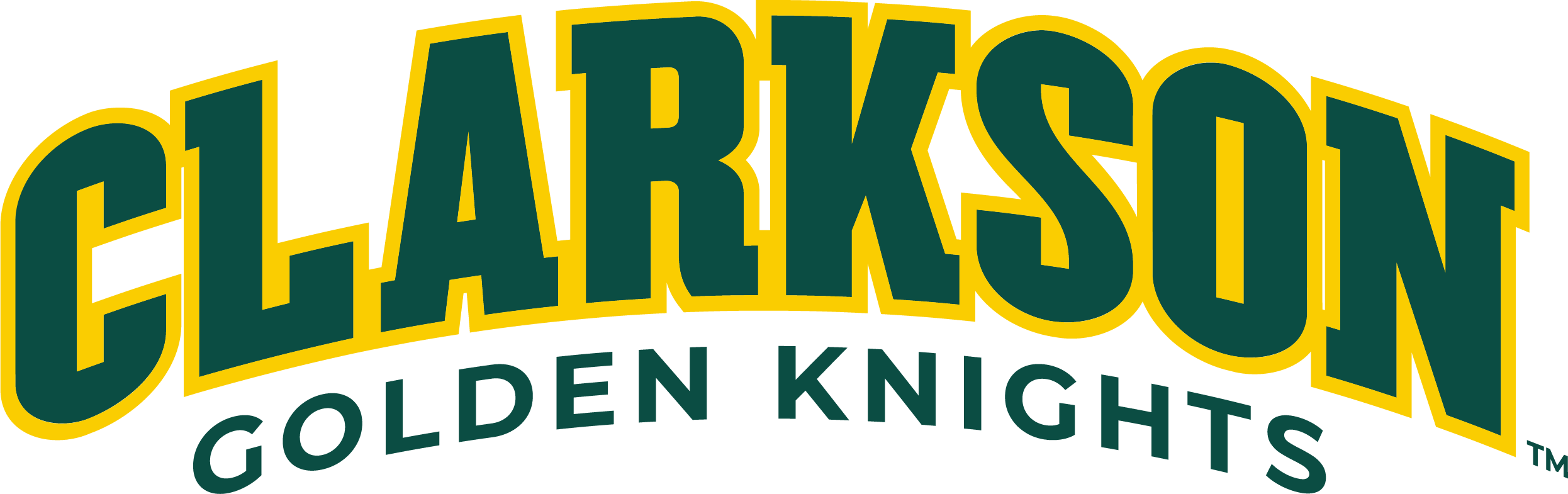

Holiday Face–Off, Champion
- Conference: 6th ECAC Hockey
- Home ice: Cheel Arena

Rankings
- USCHO: NR
- USA Today: NR

Record
- Overall: 16–17–4
- Conference: 9–10–3
- Home: 9–7–2
- Road: 5–10–2
- Neutral: 2–0–0

Coaches and captains
- Head coach: Casey Jones
- Assistant coaches: Cory Schneider; Chris Brooks; Cam Basarab
- Captain(s): Anthony Callin; Dustyn McFaul
- Alternate captain(s): Jordan Power; Mathieu Gosselin

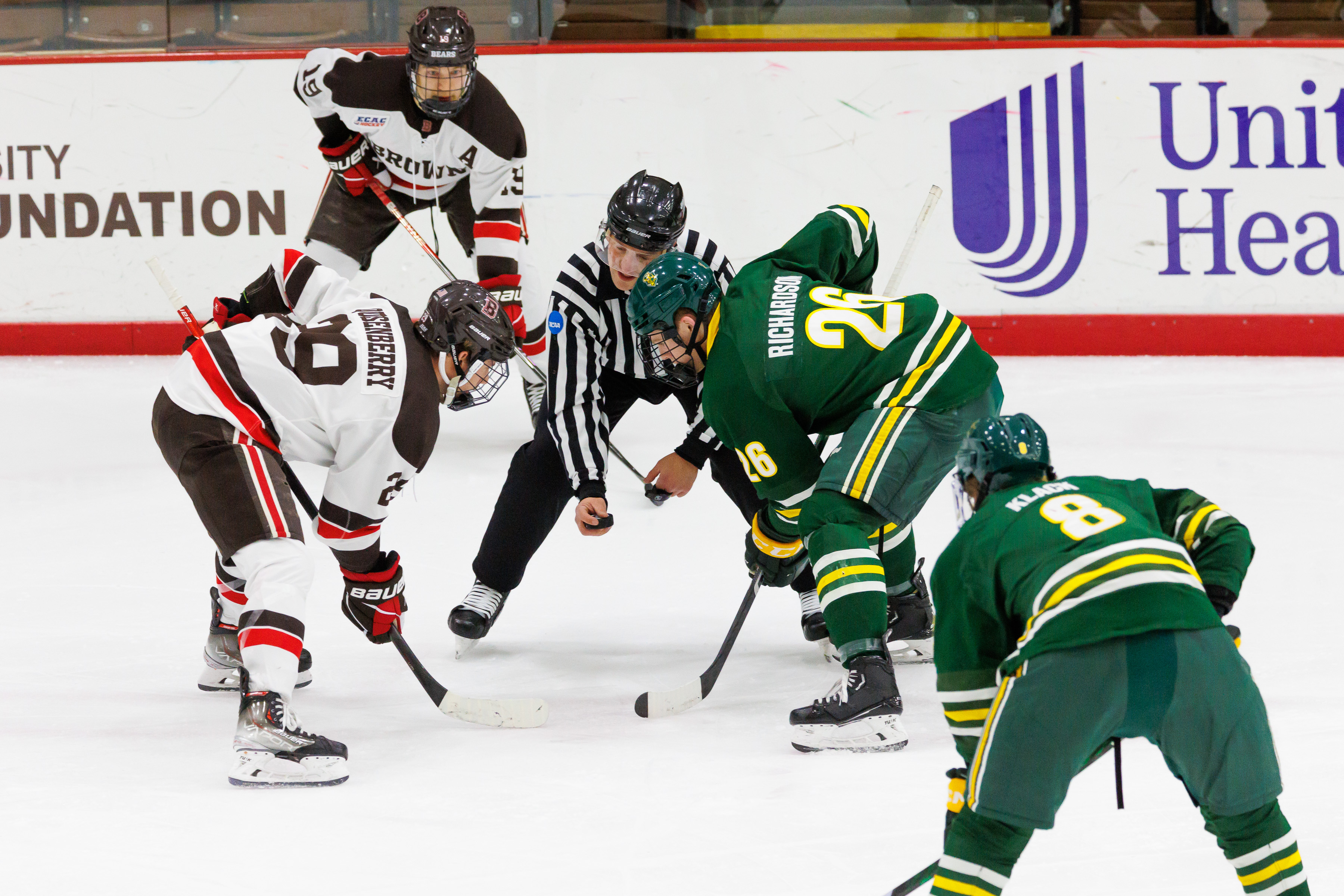
The Knights beat the Bears, 6-2

The 2022–23 Clarkson Golden Knights Men's ice hockey season was the 101st season of play for the program and 62nd in ECAC Hockey. The Golden Knights represented Clarkson University in the 2022–23 NCAA Division I men's ice hockey season, were coached by Casey Jones in his 12th season, and played their home games at Cheel Arena.

== Season ==
After missing out on the NCAA tournament for two consecutive seasons, Jones replaced all three of his assistants going into the season. There were still high expectations for a team that narrowly missed out on the NCAA tournament in each of the previous two seasons, however, Clarkson got off to a terrible start. Clarkson began the year 2–6, which was made worse when their competition was taken into consideration. The Knights lost to New Hampshire, Mercyhurst and Lake Superior State, three of the worst teams in college hockey that season. The defeats sent Clarkson plummeting towards the bottom of the rankings and the team was never able to completely recover after that. After the dreadful start, the Knights were able to put together a 5-game winning streak but inconsistency on both offense and defense helped Clarkson to finish out the first half of the season with a losing record.

The Knights opened the second half of their season by winning the Holiday Face–Off but that was about as good as it got for the club. Clarkson played up and down in the back half of the season and ended the year with a .500 record. They were able to overcome a sagging Brown team in the first round to set up a meet with Cornell in the quarterfinals. Despite their struggles, Clarkson had managed to defeat the Big Red in both regular season games, providing a glimmer of hope for the team. However, Cornell exacted their revenge by sweeping the series and ending a very disappointing season for the Knights.

== Departures ==
Player	Position	Nationality	Cause
Brandon Buhr	Forward	Canada	Returned to juniors mid-season
Nick Campoli	Forward	Canada	Graduation (signed with Iowa Heartlanders)
Jamie Collins	Forward	Canada	Transferred to Alaska Anchorage
Brian Hurley	Defenseman	United States	Graduation (retired)
Jack Jacome	Forward	Canada	Graduation (signed with Pioneers Vorarlberg)
Lukas Kälble	Defenseman	Germany	Graduation (signed with Florida Everblades)
Jacob Mucitelli	Goaltender	United States	Transferred to Maine
Jordan Robert	Forward	United States	Left program (retired)
Luke Santerno	Forward	Canada	Graduation (signed with Greenville Swamp Rabbits)
Zach Tsekos	Forward	Canada	Graduation (signed with Colorado Eagles)
Michael Underwood	Defenseman	United States	Graduate transfer to Michigan State

== Recruiting ==
Player	Position	Nationality	Age	Notes
Erik Bargholtz	Forward	United States	21	Appleton, WI
Brandon Buhr	Forward	Canada	20	Burnaby, BC
Brady Egan	Forward	Canada	20	Carp, ON
Ellis Rickwood	Forward	Canada	20	Brantford, ON
Tristan Sarsland	Defenseman	United States	18	Wayzata, MN
Jacob Schmidt-Svejstrup	Forward	Denmark	24	Charlottenlund, DEN; graduate transfer from Maine
Ryan Taylor	Forward	United States	21	St. Louis, MO
Trey Taylor	Defenseman	Canada	20	Richmond, BC
Gabriel Vinal	Goaltender	United States	23	East Syracuse, NY; graduate transfer from Brown

== Roster ==
As of August 24, 2022.

No.	Nat.	Player	Class	Pos	Height	Weight	DoB	Hometown	Previous team	NHL rights
3	(United States)	Kaelan Taylor	Junior	D	6' 2" (1.88 m)	185 lb (84 kg)	1999-01-03	Oceanside, California	Dubuque Fighting Saints (USHL)	—
4	(Canada)	Trey Taylor	Freshman	D	6' 2" (1.88 m)	190 lb (86 kg)	2002-02-04	Richmond, British Columbia	Youngstown Phantoms (USHL)	—
5	(United States)	Tristan Sarsland	Freshman	D	6' 0" (1.83 m)	185 lb (84 kg)	2004-02-25	Wayzata, Minnesota	Benilde-St. Margaret's (USHS–MN)	—
8	(Canada)	Chris Klack	Graduate	F	5' 9" (1.75 m)	174 lb (79 kg)	1997-06-03	Georgetown, Ontario	Penticton Vees (BCHL)	—
9	(United States)	Erik Bargholtz	Freshman	F	6' 2" (1.88 m)	195 lb (88 kg)	2001-04-12	Appleton, Wisconsin	Fargo Force (USHL)	—
10	(Canada)	Brady Egan	Freshman	F	5' 10" (1.78 m)	175 lb (79 kg)	2001-10-09	Carp, Ontario	Bismarck Bobcats (NAHL)	—
11	(Canada)	Alex Campbell	Junior	F	5' 11" (1.8 m)	174 lb (79 kg)	2001-02-27	Châteauguay, Quebec	Omaha Lancers (USHL)	NSH, 65th overall 2019
12	(United States)	Caden Lewandowski	Sophomore	D	6' 4" (1.93 m)	205 lb (93 kg)	2000-06-02	Mars, Pennsylvania	Johnstown Tomahawks (NAHL)	—
13	(Canada)	Mathieu Gosselin	Senior	F	5' 10" (1.78 m)	168 lb (76 kg)	1999-05-18	Quebec City, Quebec	Merritt Centennials (BCHL)	—
14	(United States)	Luke Mobley	Junior	F	6' 3" (1.91 m)	215 lb (98 kg)	1999-11-26	St. Louis Park, Minnesota	Omaha Lancers (USHL)	—
15	(Canada)	Ayrton Martino	Sophomore	F	5' 11" (1.8 m)	167 lb (76 kg)	2002-09-28	Toronto, Ontario	Omaha Lancers (USHL)	DAL, 73rd overall 2021
16	(Germany)	Tommy Pasanen	Junior	D	6' 4" (1.93 m)	218 lb (99 kg)	2001-07-30	Schweinfurt, Germany	Sioux City Musketeers (USHL)	—
17	(Canada)	Brandon Buhr	Freshman	F	6' 2" (1.88 m)	200 lb (91 kg)	2002-07-07	North Vancouver, British Columbia	Alberni Valley Bulldogs (BCHL)	—
18	(Canada)	Noah Beck	Junior	D	6' 3" (1.91 m)	191 lb (87 kg)	2001-03-25	Richmond Hill, Ontario	Fargo Force (USHL)	STL, 194th overall 2020
19	(Canada)	Ellis Rickwood	Freshman	F	6' 2" (1.88 m)	200 lb (91 kg)	2002-07-02	Brantford, Ontario	Victoria Grizzlies (BCHL)	—
20	(Canada)	Charlie Campbell	Junior	F	5' 10" (1.78 m)	163 lb (74 kg)	1999-12-01	Châteauguay, Quebec	Cornwall Colts (CCHL)	—
21	(United States)	George Grannis	Sophomore	F	6' 0" (1.83 m)	195 lb (88 kg)	2000-04-16	Duluth, Minnesota	Bismarck Bobcats (NAHL)	—
23	(Canada)	Jordan Power	Junior	D	6' 1" (1.85 m)	187 lb (85 kg)	2001-07-31	Ottawa, Ontario	Lincoln Stars (USHL)	—
26	(Canada)	Ryan Richardson	Sophomore	F	6' 1" (1.85 m)	185 lb (84 kg)	2001-04-09	Stittsville, Ontario	Fargo Force (USHL)	—
27	(Canada)	Dustyn McFaul	Senior	D	6' 2" (1.88 m)	191 lb (87 kg)	2000-08-04	Waterdown, Ontario	Pickering Panthers (OJHL)	BOS, 181st overall 2018
28	(United States)	Ryan Taylor	Freshman	F	6' 3" (1.91 m)	210 lb (95 kg)	2001-03-19	St. Peters, Missouri	Bismarck Bobcats (NAHL)	—
29	(Canada)	Anthony Romano	Senior	F	5' 11" (1.8 m)	185 lb (84 kg)	2000-10-07	Maple, Ontario	Sioux Falls Stampede (USHL)	ARI, 176th overall 2019
34	(Canada)	Brady Parker	Sophomore	G	5' 10" (1.78 m)	180 lb (82 kg)	2000-07-10	Calgary, Alberta	Okotoks Oilers (AJHL)	—
35	(United States)	Gabriel Vinal	Graduate	G	6' 2" (1.88 m)	195 lb (88 kg)	1999-01-12	Syracuse, New York	Brown (ECAC)	—
39	(Denmark)	Jacob Schmidt-Svejstrup	Graduate	F	6' 2" (1.88 m)	200 lb (91 kg)	1998-01-14	Charlottenlund, Denmark	Maine (HEA)	—
44	(United States)	Anthony Callin	Graduate	F	6' 0" (1.83 m)	206 lb (93 kg)	1998-12-23	Middleton, Wisconsin	Madison Capitols (USHL)	—
47	(United States)	Ethan Haider	Junior	G	6' 3" (1.91 m)	209 lb (95 kg)	2001-09-04	Maple Grove, Minnesota	Sioux City Musketeers (USHL)	NSH, 148th overall 2019

== Standings ==
2022–23 ECAC Hockey Standings
	Conference record										Overall record					
	GP	W	L	T	OTW	OTL	SW	PTS	GF	GA	GP	W	L	T	GF	GA
#1 Quinnipiac †	22	20	2	0	0	0	0	60	87	30	41	34	4	3	162	64
#10 Harvard	22	18	4	0	5	0	0	49	86	48	34	24	8	2	125	81
#9 Cornell	22	15	6	1	0	1	0	47	78	42	34	21	11	2	112	66
St. Lawrence	22	12	10	0	1	2	0	37	56	58	36	17	19	0	88	102
#18 Colgate *	22	11	8	3	4	1	3	36	71	58	40	19	16	5	113	109
Clarkson	22	9	10	3	0	1	0	31	60	60	37	16	17	4	102	98
Rensselaer	22	9	13	0	2	1	0	26	52	74	35	14	20	1	84	115
Union	22	8	13	1	0	0	1	26	45	68	35	14	19	2	86	117
Princeton	22	8	14	0	2	1	0	26	57	73	32	13	19	0	89	112
Yale	22	6	14	2	0	1	1	22	35	62	32	8	20	4	57	94
Brown	22	5	14	3	0	1	1	20	41	69	30	9	18	3	65	91
Dartmouth	22	4	17	1	0	2	1	16	44	70	30	5	24	1	64	106
Championship: March 18, 2023 † indicates conference regular season champion (Cleary Cup) * indicates conference tournament champion (Whitelaw Cup); Rankings: USCHO.com Top 20 Poll

== Schedule and results ==
Date	Time	Opponent^{#}	Rank^{#}	Site	TV	Decision	Result	Attendance	Record
Exhibition
October 1	7:00 PM	Ottawa*	#18	Cheel Arena • Potsdam, New York (Exhibition)	ESPN+	Haider	W 7–3	2,774	
Regular Season
October 7	7:00 PM	New Hampshire*	#17	Cheel Arena • Potsdam, New York	ESPN+	Haider	L 3–4 ^{OT}	2,267	0–1–0
October 8	7:00 PM	Merrimack*	#17	Cheel Arena • Potsdam, New York	ESPN+	Haider	L 2–3	2,200	0–2–0
October 13	7:00 PM	at #15 Providence*		Schneider Arena • Providence, Rhode Island	ESPN+	Haider	L 2–5	1,992	0–3–0
October 21	7:00 PM	Mercyhurst*		Cheel Arena • Potsdam, New York	ESPN+	Haider	L 1–2 ^{OT}	2,564	0–4–0
October 22	7:30 PM	Mercyhurst*		Cheel Arena • Potsdam, New York	ESPN+	Haider	W 5–1	3,003	1–4–0
October 28	7:00 PM	at Lake Superior State*		Taffy Abel Arena • Sault Ste. Marie, Michigan	FloHockey	Haider	W 4–3 ^{OT}	1,064	2–4–0
October 29	7:00 PM	at Lake Superior State*		Taffy Abel Arena • Sault Ste. Marie, Michigan	FloHockey	Haider	L 1–5	1,058	2–5–0
November 4	7:00 PM	Union		Cheel Arena • Potsdam, New York	ESPN+	Haider	L 2–3	2,246	2–6–0 (0–1–0)
November 5	7:00 PM	Rensselaer		Cheel Arena • Potsdam, New York (Rivalry)	ESPN+	Haider	W 3–0	2,659	3–6–0 (1–1–0)
November 11	7:00 PM	Colgate		Cheel Arena • Potsdam, New York	ESPN+	Haider	W 4–0	2,182	4–6–0 (2–1–0)
November 12	7:00 PM	Cornell		Cheel Arena • Potsdam, New York	ESPN+	Haider	W 4–1	2,782	5–6–0 (3–1–0)
November 18	7:00 PM	Arizona State*		Cheel Arena • Potsdam, New York	ESPN+	Haider	W 2–1	2,225	6–6–0
November 19	7:00 PM	Arizona State*		Cheel Arena • Potsdam, New York	ESPN+	Haider	W 5–3	2,432	7–6–0
December 2	7:00 PM	at Princeton		Hobey Baker Memorial Rink • Princeton, New Jersey	ESPN+	Haider	L 2–6	1,180	7–7–0 (3–2–0)
December 3	7:00 PM	at #2 Quinnipiac		M&T Bank Arena • Hamden, Connecticut	ESPN+	Haider	L 3–6	3,129	7–8–0 (3–3–0)
December 9	7:00 PM	Brown		Cheel Arena • Potsdam, New York	ESPN+	Haider	T 2–2 ^{SOL}	2,382	7–8–1 (3–3–1)
December 10	7:00 PM	Yale		Cheel Arena • Potsdam, New York	ESPN+	Parker	T 1–1 ^{SOL}	2,662	7–8–2 (3–3–2)
Holiday Face–Off
December 28	5:00 PM	vs. #15 Massachusetts*		Fiserv Forum • Milwaukee, Wisconsin (Holiday Face–Off Semifinal)	BSW+	Haider	W 6–3	-	8–8–2
December 29	8:30 PM	vs. Wisconsin*		Fiserv Forum • Milwaukee, Wisconsin (Holiday Face–Off Championship)	BSW	Haider	W 3–1	6,584	9–8–2
Regular Season
January 7	7:00 PM	at Holy Cross*		Hart Center • Worcester, Massachusetts	FloHockey	Haider	T 1–1 ^{OT}	379	9–8–3
January 13	7:00 PM	at #9 Harvard		Bright-Landry Hockey Center • Boston, Massachusetts	ESPN+	Haider	L 1–4	3,095	9–9–3 (3–4–2)
January 14	7:00 PM	at Dartmouth		Thompson Arena • Hanover, New Hampshire	ESPN+	Haider	W 5–4	1,821	10–9–3 (4–4–2)
January 20	7:00 PM	at Rensselaer		Houston Field House • Troy, New York (Rivalry)	ESPN+	Haider	L 2–3	2,723	10–10–3 (4–5–2)
January 21	4:00 PM	at Union		Achilles Rink • Schenectady, New York	ESPN+	Haider	W 4–3	2,245	11–10–3 (5–5–2)
January 27	7:00 PM	at St. Lawrence		Appleton Arena • Canton, New York (Rivalry)	ESPN+	Haider	L 2–4	2,524	11–11–3 (5–6–2)
January 28	7:00 PM	St. Lawrence		Cheel Arena • Potsdam, New York (Rivalry)	ESPN+	Haider	L 2–4	-	11–12–3 (5–7–2)
February 3	7:00 PM	at Yale		Ingalls Rink • New Haven, Connecticut	ESPN+	Parker	L 0–4	1,426	11–13–3 (5–8–2)
February 4	7:00 PM	at Brown		Meehan Auditorium • Providence, Rhode Island	ESPN+	Haider	W 6–2	709	12–13–3 (6–8–2)
February 10	7:00 PM	#2 Quinnipiac		Cheel Arena • Potsdam, New York	ESPN+	Haider	L 0–3	2,202	12–14–3 (6–9–2)
February 11	7:00 PM	Princeton		Cheel Arena • Potsdam, New York	ESPN+	Haider	W 4–1	2,648	13–14–3 (7–9–2)
February 17	7:00 PM	at #11 Cornell		Lynah Rink • Ithaca, New York	ESPN+	Haider	W 4–3	3,102	14–14–3 (8–9–2)
February 18	7:00 PM	at Colgate		Class of 1965 Arena • Hamilton, New York	ESPN+	Haider	T 3–3 ^{SOL}	1,483	14–14–4 (8–9–3)
February 24	7:00 PM	Dartmouth		Cheel Arena • Potsdam, New York	ESPN+	Haider	W 4–0	2,345	15–14–4 (9–9–3)
February 25	7:00 PM	#7 Harvard		Cheel Arena • Potsdam, New York	ESPN+	Haider	L 2–3	2,566	15–15–4 (9–10–3)
ECAC Hockey Tournament
March 4	7:00 PM	Brown*		Cheel Arena • Potsdam, New York (First Round)	ESPN+	Haider	W 5–1	2,527	16–15–4
March 10	7:00 PM	at #12 Cornell*		Lynah Rink • Ithaca, New York (Quarterfinal Game 1)	ESPN+	Haider	L 1–2	3,752	16–16–4
March 11	7:00 PM	at #12 Cornell*		Lynah Rink • Ithaca, New York (Quarterfinal Game 2)	ESPN+	Haider	L 1–3	3,935	16–17–4
*Non-conference game. ^{#}Rankings from USCHO.com Poll. All times are in Eastern Time. Source:

== Scoring statistics ==
Name	Position	Games	Goals	Assists	Points	PIM
Ayrton Martino	LW	37	9	29	38	30
Mathieu Gosselin	RW	37	14	19	33	23
Alex Campbell	C/LW	33	14	11	25	8
Noah Beck	D	37	6	17	23	18
Jacob Schmidt-Svejstrup	RW	37	9	12	21	56
Anthony Callin	F	35	11	8	19	8
Ryan Taylor	F	33	8	11	19	0
Anthony Romano	C/RW	19	9	6	15	8
Ryan Richardson	LW	37	5	8	13	10
Jordan Power	D	37	2	11	13	18
Dustyn McFaul	D	30	0	9	9	33
Trey Taylor	D	36	3	5	8	18
Tommy Pasanen	D	32	2	4	6	40
Brady Egan	C	30	3	2	5	8
Erik Bargholtz	F	32	3	2	5	12
Luke Mobley	F	33	1	4	5	38
Ellis Rickwood	C	35	0	5	5	14
Tristan Sarsland	D	27	1	3	4	20
Chris Klack	C/W	24	1	2	3	8
Kaelan Taylor	D	29	1	1	2	21
George Grannis	F	16	0	2	2	2
Caden Lewandowski	D	23	0	1	1	0
Brady Parker	G	5	0	0	0	0
Brandon Buhr	F	9	0	0	0	2
Ethan Haider	G	35	0	0	0	0
Total			102	176	278	393

== Goaltending statistics ==
Name	Games	Minutes	Wins	Losses	Ties	Goals against	Saves	Shut outs	SV %	GAA
Brady Parker	7	195:19	0	1	1	6	79	0	.929	1.84
Ethan Haider	35	2033:36	16	16	3	85	818	3	.906	2.51
Empty Net	-	22:34	-	-	-	7	-	-	-	-
Total	37	2251:29	16	17	4	98	897	3	.902	2.61

== Rankings ==
Poll	Week																											
Poll	Pre	1	2	3	4	5	6	7	8	9	10	11	12	13	14	15	16	17	18	19	20	21	22	23	24	25	26	27 (Final)
USCHO.com	18	-	17	NR	NR	NR	NR	NR	NR	NR	NR	NR	NR	-	NR	NR	NR	NR	NR	NR	NR	NR	NR	NR	NR	NR	-	NR
USA Today	17	17	17	NR	NR	NR	NR	NR	NR	NR	NR	NR	NR	NR	NR	NR	NR	NR	NR	NR	NR	NR	NR	NR	NR	NR	NR	NR

Note: USCHO did not release a poll in weeks 1, 13, or 26.

== Awards and honors ==
Player	Award	Ref
Noah Beck	ECAC Hockey Third Team	
Ayrton Martino	ECAC Hockey Third Team	
Mathieu Gosselin	ECAC Hockey Third Team	
