= 2022–23 Colgate Raiders men's ice hockey season =

ECAC Hockey Tournament, Champion NCAA Tournament, Regional Semifinal
- Conference: 5th ECAC Hockey
- Home ice: Class of 1965 Arena

Rankings
- USCHO: #18
- USA Today: #20

Record
- Overall: 19–16–5
- Conference: 11–8–3
- Home: 9–5–4
- Road: 8–10–1
- Neutral: 2–1–0

Coaches and captains
- Head coach: Don Vaughan
- Assistant coaches: Dana Borges; Chris Azzano
- Captain: Arnaud Vachon
- Alternate captain(s): Pierson Brandon; Colton Young

The 2022–23 Colgate Raiders Men's ice hockey season was the 93rd season of play for the program and the 62nd in the ECAC Hockey conference. The Raiders represented the Colgate University, played their home games at Class of 1965 Arena and were coached by Don Vaughan, in his 30th season as their head coach.

== Season ==
Despite returning most of the players from the previous season, Colgate got off to a rather poor start. During the non-conference part of their schedule, the Raiders won just twice in eight games, leaving them floundering near the bottom of the national rankings. At the time the biggest problem for Colgate was the lack of scoring; the Raiders scored more than two goals in just two of those games (both wins) and had been shutout twice. The team suffered a third blanking at the hands of Clarkson in early November, however, after that loss the offense began to pick up the pace. Colgate wrapped a pair of 3-game winning streaks around a lost weekend at Niagara.

The Raiders kicked off the second half of their season with a decent showing against Maine but a bigger feat came in the middle of January. Coming off a disappointing loss to Cornell, Quinnipiac was feeling sorry for itself and was caught off guard by the Raiders. Colgate scored a victory against the then-number 1 team and put itself into a position for a possible bye for the ECAC tournament. The team's offense began to struggle once more and the Raiders won just 2 out of their last 10 games. Colgate finished the regular season with a losing record and were 1 point behind St. Lawrence for the final quarterfinal bye.

Entering postseason play, Colgate's only chance at an NCAA berth was by winning a conference championship, something the program hadn't done in 33 years. For the first round, at least, the team got a favorable draw by taking on Dartmouth, one of the worst teams in college hockey that year. While the Big Green opened the scoring, Colgate quickly tied the game and reeled off 5 consecutive goals to take a commanding lead. Two late markers by the Hanoverians tightened the final score but didn't stop the Raiders from reaching the quarterfinals. Now that they were facing a significantly better opponent, Colgate had a tougher time pulling out a win. The Raiders began the best of three series by playing a bad 1st period and falling behind 0–3. With the team needing a spark, alternate captain Colton Young stepped up and assisted on two of the team's three goals as they clawed back to tie the score. The match moved into overtime and, with Carter Gylander, standing tall in goal, Young netted the game-winner to put the Raiders up by 1. The two teams traded positions in the rematch with Colgate scoring the first 3 goals before St. Lawrence tried their hand at a comeback. Fortunately, the defense fared better than the Larries had and Colgate skated away with a victory, advancing to the semifinals.

The Raiders had to get through Quinnipiac to continue their season and faced a daunting challenge from the number 2 team in the nation. The Bobcats started fast, widely outshooting Colgate in the first, but it was Daniel Panetta who opened the scoring for the Raiders. Gylander and the defense weathered the storm and shut down Quinnipiac until the third, only allowing the Bobcats to score on the power play. As the game progressed, Colgate began to get the upper hand in term of offensive chances and the Raiders continued to press once overtime began. Near the middle of the 5th period, Ross Mitton was finally able to secure the game-winner and send the Raiders to the championship game.

Colgate was making its first championship appearance since 2015 and faced the same opponent they had then in Harvard. While the Crimson were expected to win, they had already punched their ticket to the NCAA tournament, having been guaranteed a top-10 ranking regardless of the outcome of the game. With Colgate still playing to save their season, the Raiders got a jump on the match with goals from Colton and Alex Young in the first. Harvard cut into the lead in the third but the Raiders quickly reestablished their 2-goal edge. Harvard assailed Gylander in the third, firing 15 shots on goal to just 5 from Colgate. Matthew Coronato managed to get a goal on the power play but the Raider defense stopped the rest and Colgate won just the second conference championship in program history.

The reward for the raiders was being set against Michigan in the regional semifinals. Th high-powered Wolverines attacked the Colgate net all game but did give up several opportunities in the process. Colgate did well to end the first period down 0–1 and were just one mistake away from tying the game. The Raiders were continuing to hold Michigan back until part way through the second when Reid Irwin took a holding penalty. Michigan scored on its second power play opportunity which began a deluge of goals. In less than 10 minutes, the Wolverines scored 7 times and effectively ended the game. Nic Belpedio managed to get the Raiders lone goal early in the third and both teams appeared willing to just play out the rest of the game. At about the 50-minute mark, Alex Young received a match penalty for butt-ending Mackie Samoskevich and was ejected from the game. Irate at the penalty, Michigan went back on the attack during the major and scored three more goals to raise the score to an embarrassing 11–1 margin. Tempers cooled afterwards and the final five minutes passed without incident and the Raiders meekly ended their season.

== Departures ==
Player	Position	Nationality	Cause
Mitchel Benson	Goaltender	Canada	Graduate transfer to Boston College
Andrew Farrier	Goaltender	Canada	Graduation (retired)
William Friend	Goaltender	United States	Graduation (retired)
Cole Hanson	Forward	United States	Transferred to Maine
Paul McAvoy	Forward	United States	Graduation (signed with Atlanta Gladiators)
Elliott McDermott	Defenseman	Canada	Transferred to Massachusetts
Josh McKechney	Forward	Canada	Graduation (signed with Atlanta Gladiators)
Jeffrey Stewart	Forward	Canada	Graduation (retired)

== Recruiting ==
Player	Position	Nationality	Age	Notes
Nick Haas	Goaltender	United States	20	Williamsville, NY
Simon Labelle	Forward	United States	21	Ottawa, ON
Bobby Metz	Defenseman	United States	21	Detroit, MI
Owen Neuharth	Forward	United States	20	Prior Lake, MN
Daniel Panetta	Forward	Canada	21	Belleville, ON
Andrew Takacs	Goaltender	United States	21	Bowie, MD
Sebastian Tamburro	Forward	Canada	20	Toronto, ON

== Roster ==
As of August 26, 2022.

No.	Nat.	Player	Class	Pos	Height	Weight	DoB	Hometown	Previous team	NHL rights
1	(United States)	Andrew Takacs	Freshman	G	6' 2" (1.88 m)	190 lb (86 kg)	2001-02-27	Bowie, Maryland	New Jersey Titans (NAHL)	—
2	(United States)	Pierson Brandon (A)	Junior	D	6' 0" (1.83 m)	180 lb (82 kg)	2000-06-26	Irvington, New York	Aberdeen Wings (NAHL)	—
3	(United States)	Anthony Stark	Senior	D	5' 9" (1.75 m)	170 lb (77 kg)	1999-04-09	New York, New York	Madison Capitols (USHL)	—
4	(Canada)	Reid Irwin	Junior	D	6' 1" (1.85 m)	192 lb (87 kg)	1999-03-01	Victoria, British Columbia	Denver (NCHC)	—
6	(United States)	Bobby Metz	Freshman	D	5' 9" (1.75 m)	178 lb (81 kg)	2001-08-20	Bloomfield Hills, Michigan	Minnesota Wilderness (NAHL)	—
7	(Canada)	Simon Labelle	Freshman	F	5' 10" (1.78 m)	175 lb (79 kg)	2002-09-03	Ottawa, Ontario	Prince George Spruce Kings (BCHL)	—
8	(United States)	P. J. Garrett	Junior	D	6' 4" (1.93 m)	210 lb (95 kg)	2000-01-17	Duxbury, Massachusetts	Powell River Kings (BCHL)	—
9	(United States)	Nic Belpedio	Sophomore	D	5' 10" (1.78 m)	194 lb (88 kg)	2001-10-09	Skokie, Illinois	Waterloo Black Hawks (USHL)	—
10	(Canada)	Arnaud Vachon (C)	Senior	F	6' 2" (1.88 m)	210 lb (95 kg)	1998-05-13	Ajax, Ontario	Brooks Bandits (AJHL)	—
11	(Canada)	Daniel Panetta	Freshman	F	5' 10" (1.78 m)	175 lb (79 kg)	2001-05-20	Belleville, Ontario	Salmon Arm Silverbacks (BCHL)	—
12	(Canada)	Colton Young (A)	Senior	F	6' 0" (1.83 m)	175 lb (79 kg)	1998-08-23	Calgary, Alberta	Canmore Eagles (AJHL)	—
13	(Switzerland)	Matt Verboon	Senior	F	6' 1" (1.85 m)	195 lb (88 kg)	2000-02-23	Geneva, Switzerland	Salmon Arm Silverbacks (BCHL)	—
14	(Canada)	Ethan Manderville	Senior	F	6' 4" (1.93 m)	225 lb (102 kg)	2000-07-01	Ottawa, Ontario	Ottawa Jr. Senators (CCHL)	—
15	(United States)	Jack Hoey	Senior	F	6' 1" (1.85 m)	200 lb (91 kg)	1998-11-03	Fairfield, Connecticut	Choate Rosemary Hall (USHS–CT)	—
17	(United States)	Ross Mitton	Junior	F	5' 10" (1.78 m)	185 lb (84 kg)	2000-07-05	Copiague Harbor, New York	Omaha Lancers (USHL)	—
18	(United States)	Ben Raymond	Sophomore	F	5' 11" (1.8 m)	180 lb (82 kg)	2001-08-22	Newton, Massachusetts	Powell River Kings (BCHL)	—
19	(United States)	Ryan McGuire	Sophomore	F	6' 2" (1.88 m)	183 lb (83 kg)	2002-07-27	New Canaan, Connecticut	Penticton Vees (BCHL)	—
20	(Canada)	Levi Glasman	Junior	F	6' 2" (1.88 m)	172 lb (78 kg)	1999-07-31	Lacombe, Alberta	Powell River Kings (BCHL)	—
21	(Canada)	Alex Young	Junior	F	5' 11" (1.8 m)	180 lb (82 kg)	2001-03-22	Calgary, Alberta	Canmore Eagles (AJHL)	SJS, 196th overall 2020
22	(Canada)	Sebastian Tamburro	Freshman	F	5' 10" (1.78 m)	180 lb (82 kg)	2002-03-04	Toronto, Ontario	Bonnyville Pontiacs (AJHL)	—
23	(United States)	Owen Neuharth	Freshman	F	5' 11" (1.8 m)	177 lb (80 kg)	2001-10-25	Savage, Minnesota	Fairbanks Ice Dogs (NAHL)	—
25	(United States)	Tommy Bergsland	Sophomore	D	6' 3" (1.91 m)	185 lb (84 kg)	2001-03-23	Minnetrista, Minnesota	Bismarck Bobcats (NAHL)	—
26	(Canada)	Liam Watson-Brawn	Senior	D	6' 0" (1.83 m)	190 lb (86 kg)	1999-04-06	Vancouver, British Columbia	Prince George Spruce Kings (BCHL)	—
27	(United States)	Nick Anderson	Junior	D	5' 10" (1.78 m)	165 lb (75 kg)	1999-01-04	Independence, Minnesota	Sioux Falls Stampede (USHL)	—
28	(Canada)	Alex DiPaolo	Sophomore	F	6' 1" (1.85 m)	188 lb (85 kg)	2000-04-28	Oakville, Ontario	Victoria Grizzlies (BCHL)	—
35	(United States)	Nick Haas	Freshman	G	6' 4" (1.93 m)	195 lb (88 kg)	2001-11-11	Buffalo, New York	Chippewa Steel (NAHL)	—
37	(Canada)	Carter Gylander	Junior	G	6' 5" (1.96 m)	185 lb (84 kg)	2001-06-05	Beaumont, Alberta	Sherwood Park Crusaders (AJHL)	DET, 191st overall 2019

== Standings ==
2022–23 ECAC Hockey Standings
	Conference record										Overall record					
	GP	W	L	T	OTW	OTL	SW	PTS	GF	GA	GP	W	L	T	GF	GA
#1 Quinnipiac †	22	20	2	0	0	0	0	60	87	30	41	34	4	3	162	64
#10 Harvard	22	18	4	0	5	0	0	49	86	48	34	24	8	2	125	81
#9 Cornell	22	15	6	1	0	1	0	47	78	42	34	21	11	2	112	66
St. Lawrence	22	12	10	0	1	2	0	37	56	58	36	17	19	0	88	102
#18 Colgate *	22	11	8	3	4	1	3	36	71	58	40	19	16	5	113	109
Clarkson	22	9	10	3	0	1	0	31	60	60	37	16	17	4	102	98
Rensselaer	22	9	13	0	2	1	0	26	52	74	35	14	20	1	84	115
Union	22	8	13	1	0	0	1	26	45	68	35	14	19	2	86	117
Princeton	22	8	14	0	2	1	0	26	57	73	32	13	19	0	89	112
Yale	22	6	14	2	0	1	1	22	35	62	32	8	20	4	57	94
Brown	22	5	14	3	0	1	1	20	41	69	30	9	18	3	65	91
Dartmouth	22	4	17	1	0	2	1	16	44	70	30	5	24	1	64	106
Championship: March 18, 2023 † indicates conference regular season champion (Cleary Cup) * indicates conference tournament champion (Whitelaw Cup); Rankings: USCHO.com Top 20 Poll

== Schedule and results ==
Date	Time	Opponent^{#}	Rank^{#}	Site	TV	Decision	Result	Attendance	Record
Exhibition
October 2	5:00 PM	Guelph*		Class of 1965 Arena • Hamilton, New York (Exhibition)		Gylander	W 5–1	0	
Regular Season
October 7	7:00 PM	Northern Michigan*		Class of 1965 Arena • Hamilton, New York	ESPN+	Gylander	L 2–3	827	0–1–0
October 8	4:00 PM	Northern Michigan*		Class of 1965 Arena • Hamilton, New York	ESPN+	Gylander	L 1–4	518	0–2–0
October 14	10:05 PM	at Arizona State*		Mullett Arena • Tempe, Arizona	Pac-12 Insider	Gylander	L 0–2	5,026	0–3–0
October 15	10:05 PM	at Arizona State*		Mullett Arena • Tempe, Arizona	Pac-12 Insider	Gylander	W 4–0	5,000	1–3–0
October 21	7:00 PM	at Merrimack*		J. Thom Lawler Rink • North Andover, Massachusetts	ESPN+	Gylander	L 0–5	2,072	1–4–0
October 22	7:00 PM	at Merrimack*		J. Thom Lawler Rink • North Andover, Massachusetts	ESPN+	Gylander	W 5–3	4,031	2–4–0
October 28	7:00 PM	Vermont*		Class of 1965 Arena • Hamilton, New York	ESPN+	Gylander	L 1–2	650	2–5–0
October 29	4:00 PM	Vermont*		Class of 1965 Arena • Hamilton, New York	ESPN+	Gylander	T 1–1 ^{OT}	803	2–5–1
November 4	7:00 PM	at #7 Quinnipiac		M&T Bank Arena • Hamden, Connecticut	ESPN+	Gylander	L 2–3	2,714	2–6–1 (0–1–0)
November 5	7:00 PM	at Princeton		Hobey Baker Memorial Rink • Princeton, New Jersey	ESPN+	Gylander	W 4–3 ^{OT}	1,102	3–6–1 (1–1–0)
November 11	7:00 PM	at Clarkson		Cheel Arena • Potsdam, New York	ESPN+	Gylander	L 0–4	2,182	3–7–1 (1–2–0)
November 12	7:00 PM	at St. Lawrence		Appleton Arena • Canton, New York	ESPN+	Gylander	W 4–1	1,611	4–7–1 (2–2–0)
November 18	7:00 PM	Brown		Class of 1965 Arena • Hamilton, New York	ESPN+	Gylander	W 3–2	882	5–7–1 (3–2–0)
November 19	7:00 PM	Yale		Class of 1965 Arena • Hamilton, New York	ESPN+	Gylander	W 8–1	803	6–7–1 (4–2–0)
November 25	3:30 PM	at Niagara*		Dwyer Arena • Lewiston, New York	FloHockey	Gylander	L 2–3	496	6–8–1
November 26	3:30 PM	at Niagara*		Dwyer Arena • Lewiston, New York	FloHockey	Takacs	L 2–3 ^{OT}	527	6–9–1
December 2	7:00 PM	Dartmouth		Class of 1965 Arena • Hamilton, New York	ESPN+	Gylander	W 5–1	732	7–9–1 (5–2–0)
December 3	7:00 PM	#7 Harvard		Class of 1965 Arena • Hamilton, New York	ESPN+	Gylander	W 6–4	1,088	8–9–1 (6–2–0)
December 30	7:00 PM	Maine*		Class of 1965 Arena • Hamilton, New York	ESPN+	Gylander	W 5–2	940	9–9–1
December 31	4:00 PM	Maine*		Class of 1965 Arena • Hamilton, New York	ESPN+	Gylander	T 1–1 ^{OT}	833	9–9–2
January 6	7:00 PM	at Rensselaer		Houston Field House • Troy, New York	ESPN+	Gylander	L 3–5	1,847	9–10–2 (6–3–0)
January 7	4:00 PM	at Union		Achilles Rink • Schenectady, New York	ESPN+	Gylander	W 2–1	1,904	10–10–2 (7–3–0)
January 20	7:00 PM	Princeton		Class of 1965 Arena • Hamilton, New York	ESPN+	Gylander	W 5–0	1,102	11–10–2 (8–3–0)
January 21	7:00 PM	#1 Quinnipiac		Class of 1965 Arena • Hamilton, New York	ESPN+	Gylander	W 3–2	1,001	12–10–2 (9–3–0)
January 27	7:00 PM	at #10 Harvard		Bright-Landry Hockey Center • Boston, Massachusetts	ESPN+	Gylander	L 4–5 ^{OT}	2,152	12–11–2 (9–4–0)
January 28	7:00 PM	at Dartmouth		Thompson Arena • Hanover, New Hampshire	ESPN+	Gylander	W 4–3 ^{OT}	2,137	13–11–2 (10–4–0)
February 3	7:00 PM	Union		Class of 1965 Arena • Hamilton, New York	ESPN+	Gylander	L 1–3	831	13–12–2 (10–5–0)
February 4	7:00 PM	Rensselaer		Class of 1965 Arena • Hamilton, New York	ESPN+	Gylander	L 1–2	959	13–13–2 (10–6–0)
February 10	7:00 PM	at #11 Cornell		Lynah Rink • Ithaca, New York	ESPN+	Gylander	L 2–3	4,267	13–14–2 (10–7–0)
February 11	7:00 PM	#11 Cornell		Class of 1965 Arena • Hamilton, New York	ESPN+	Gylander	T 4–4 ^{SOW}	2,271	13–14–3 (10–7–1)
February 17	7:00 PM	St. Lawrence		Class of 1965 Arena • Hamilton, New York	ESPN+	Gylander	W 3–2 ^{OT}	914	14–14–3 (11–7–1)
February 18	7:00 PM	Clarkson		Class of 1965 Arena • Hamilton, New York	ESPN+	Gylander	T 3–3 ^{SOW}	1,483	14–14–4 (11–7–2)
February 24	7:00 PM	at Yale		Ingalls Rink • New Haven, Connecticut	ESPN+	Gylander	L 2–4	1,421	14–15–4 (11–8–2)
February 25	7:00 PM	at Brown		Meehan Auditorium • Providence, Rhode Island	ESPN+	Gylander	T 2–2 ^{SOW}	712	14–15–5 (11–8–3)
ECAC Hockey Tournament
March 3	7:00 PM	Dartmouth*		Class of 1965 Arena • Hamilton, New York (First Round)	ESPN+	Gylander	W 5–3	926	15–15–5
March 10	7:00 PM	at St. Lawrence*		Appleton Arena • Canton, New York (Quarterfinal Game 1)	ESPN+	Gylander	W 4–3 ^{OT}	2,848	16–15–5
March 11	7:00 PM	at St. Lawrence*		Appleton Arena • Canton, New York (Quarterfinal Game 2)	ESPN+	Gylander	W 3–2	2,318	17–15–5
March 17	4:00 PM	vs. #2 Quinnipiac*		Herb Brooks Arena • Lake Placid, New York (Semifinal)	ESPN+	Gylander	W 2–1 ^{2OT}	3,533	18–15–5
March 18	7:30 PM	vs. #6 Harvard*		Herb Brooks Arena • Lake Placid, New York (Championship)	ESPN+	Gylander	W 3–2	3,839	19–15–5
NCAA Tournament
March 24	8:30 PM	vs. #2 Michigan*	#19	PPL Center • Allentown, Pennsylvania (Midwest Regional Semifinal)	ESPN2	Gylander	L 1–11	7,067	19–16–5
*Non-conference game. ^{#}Rankings from USCHO.com Poll. All times are in Eastern Time. Source:

== Scoring statistics ==
Name	Position	Games	Goals	Assists	Points	PIM
Alex Young	C/W	40	21	18	39	37
Matt Verboon	C/RW	40	16	19	35	23
Nick Anderson	D	40	3	26	29	39
Colton Young	F	40	11	17	28	35
Ross Mitton	F	40	9	18	27	10
Alex DiPaolo	LW	40	11	15	26	24
Ethan Manderville	C	34	8	8	16	22
Simon Labelle	LW	40	4	11	15	6
Nic Belpedio	D	40	5	9	14	14
Reid Irwin	D/C	39	1	13	14	45
Daniel Panetta	C	34	5	6	11	4
Tommy Bergsland	D	40	1	9	10	25
Ryan McGuire	C	40	4	6	10	37
Ben Raymond	C/LW	39	5	5	10	14
Levi Glasman	LW	38	3	6	9	6
Pierson Brandon	D	32	2	4	6	20
Arnaud Vachon	C	28	2	3	5	27
Sebastian Tamburro	LW	25	1	1	2	4
Anthony Stark	D	30	1	0	1	4
Owen Neuharth	C	13	0	1	1	0
Carter Gylander	G	39	0	1	1	2
Bobby Metz	D	16	0	1	1	4
Liam Watson-Brawn	D	8	0	0	0	2
P. J. Garrett	D	20	0	0	0	10
Andrew Takacs	G	3	0	0	0	0
Total			113	197	310	414

== Goaltending statistics ==
Name	Games	Minutes	Wins	Losses	Ties	Goals against	Saves	Shut outs	SV %	GAA
Carter Gylander	39	2385:34	19	15	5	98	1044	2	.914	2.46
Andrew Takacs	8	83:23	0	1	0	6	27	0	.818	4.32
Empty Net	-	14:37	-	-	-	5	-	-	-	-
Total	40	2483:34	19	16	5	109	1071	2	.908	2.63

== Rankings ==
Poll	Week																											
Poll	Pre	1	2	3	4	5	6	7	8	9	10	11	12	13	14	15	16	17	18	19	20	21	22	23	24	25	26	27 (Final)
USCHO.com	NR	-	NR	NR	NR	NR	NR	NR	NR	NR	NR	NR	NR	-	NR	NR	NR	NR	NR	NR	NR	NR	NR	NR	NR	19	-	18
USA Today	NR	NR	NR	NR	NR	NR	NR	NR	NR	NR	NR	NR	NR	NR	NR	NR	NR	NR	NR	NR	NR	NR	NR	NR	NR	19	20	20

Note: USCHO did not release a poll in weeks 1, 13, or 26.

== Awards and honors ==
Player	Award	Ref
Matt Verboon	ECAC Hockey Student-Athlete of the Year	
Carter Gylander	ECAC Hockey Most Outstanding Player in Tournament	
Alex Young	ECAC Hockey First Team	
Carter Gylander	ECAC Hockey All-Tournament Team	
Ross Mitton	ECAC Hockey All-Tournament Team	
Alex Young	ECAC Hockey All-Tournament Team	
