= Friendship Four =

Northern Irish college ice hockey tournament

Tournament information
- Sport: College ice hockey
- Location: Belfast, Northern Ireland
- Number of tournaments: 8 (men); 4 (women)
- Format: Men: Single-elimination; Women: Two-game total-goals (2019–2024); Single-elimination (2026–present)
- Venue: The O2 Belfast
- Teams: 4

Current champion
- Men: Miami; Women: Boston University

The Friendship Four is an annual mid-season college ice hockey tournament that has been held since 2015 at The O2 Belfast in Belfast, Northern Ireland with the winner receiving the Belpot Trophy. It is currently the only college ice hockey tournament to take place outside of the United States.

== History ==
The tournament began as a way to foster stronger economic development, trade and investment, tourism, cultural exchange, and educational linkages between the sister cities of Boston and Belfast. Each year four teams are selected to participate in the tournament which is typically held on the same weekend as Thanksgiving in the United States. As of 2024, all games have been played at the The O2 Belfast while all participating schools came from the eastern region between 2015 and 2024. While only two participating universities have come from Boston, many more have come from the same general region.

After the 2020 and 2021 series were cancelled due to the COVID-19 pandemic, the 2022 Friendship Four was announced on December 4, 2021. The series continued in 2024, and was played as a full women's tournament for the first time in 2026 after three previous two-team women's contests in 2019–20 and 2024.

== Yearly results ==
=== Men's Tournament ===
Year	Champion	Runner-up	Third place	Fourth place	Ref.
2015	Massachusetts–Lowell	Brown	Northeastern	Colgate	
2016	Vermont	Quinnipiac	Massachusetts and St. Lawrence (tie)		
2017	Clarkson	Providence	Maine	Rensselaer	
2018	Union	Boston University	Yale	Connecticut	
2019	Northeastern	Colgate	New Hampshire	Princeton	
2022	Quinnipiac	Massachusetts	Massachusetts Lowell	Dartmouth	
2024	Boston University	Notre Dame	Harvard	Merrimack	
2025	Miami	Union	Sacred Heart	RIT	

=== Women's Tournament ===
Year	Champion	Runner-up	Third place	Fourth Place	Ref.
2019	Northeastern	Clarkson	Only two women's teams contested the Friendship Series between 2019–2024.		
2020	Quinnipiac	Merrimack	Only two women's teams contested the Friendship Series between 2019–2024.		
2024	Princeton	Providence	Only two women's teams contested the Friendship Series between 2019–2024.		
2026	Boston University	Harvard	Quinnipiac	Minnesota Duluth	

== Upcoming tournaments ==
=== Men's Tournament ===
Year	Team 1	Team 2	Team 3	Team 4	Ref.
2026	Colgate	Connecticut	Minnesota Duluth	Providence	
2027	North Dakota	Northeastern	Quinnipiac	Wisconsin	
2028	Dartmouth	Maine	Notre Dame	Omaha	

=== Women's Tournament ===
Year	Team 1	Team 2	Team 3	Team 4	Ref.
Future women's tournaments have yet to be announced.
