= Battle of Whitney Avenue =

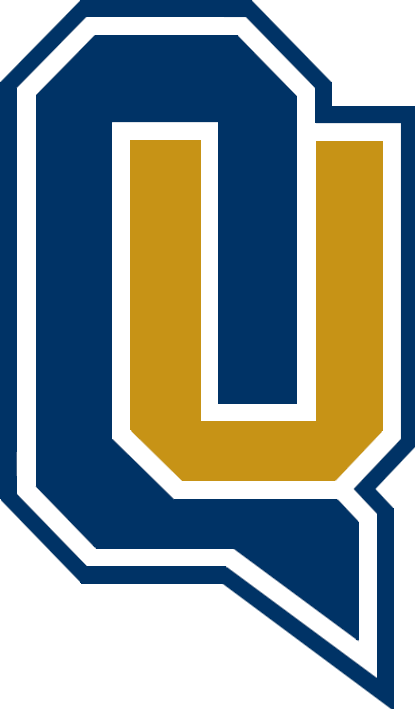
- Yale Bulldogs Quinnipiac Bobcats
- Sport: Ice hockey
- First meeting: January 8, 2006; Yale 4, Quinnipiac 3
- Latest meeting: February 7, 2026; Quninnipiac 8, Yale 0
- Trophy: Heroes' Hat

Statistics
- Total meetings: 49
- All-time series: Quninnipiac leads, 36–8–5
- Largest victory: Yale, 6–1 (2011); Quinnipiac, 8–0 (2026)
- Longest win streak: Quninnipiac, 17 (2018–2025)
- Longest unbeaten streak: Quninnipiac, 17 (2018–2025)
- Current win streak: Quninnipiac, 1 (2026–present)

The Battle of Whitney Avenue refers to the college ice hockey series between Quinnipiac Bobcats and Yale Bulldogs, both currently members of ECAC.

== History ==
In 2006, the Quinnipiac Bobcats moved to the ECAC. Since then, Quinnipiac and the Yale Bulldogs have become one of biggest non-Ivy rivalries in the ECAC. The rivalry got its name from the fact that the two campuses are separated by a mere eight miles on Whitney Avenue from Hamden to New Haven.

The two teams met on April 13, 2013 for the fourth time in the 2012–13 season in Pittsburgh to play for the national championship. Although Quinnipiac had won the previous three meetings (all in the 2012–13 season) by a combined score of 13–3, Yale shut them out in the 2013 NCAA Division I Men's Ice Hockey National Championship Game, 4–0.

The 8 Mile Distance between Yale University and Quinnipiac University.

== Game Results ==
| Quinnipiac victories | Yale victories | Tie games |

| No. | Date | Location | Winner | Score |
|---|---|---|---|---|
| 1 | January 8, 2006 | New Haven, CT | Yale | 4–3 |
| 2 | February 24, 2006 | New Haven, CT | Quinnipiac | 6–2 |
| 3 | January 13, 2007 | New Haven, CT | Quinnipiac | 6–2 |
| 4 | February 2, 2007 | Hamden, CT | Quinnipiac | 6–4 |
| 5 | January 12, 2008 | New Haven, CT | Quinnipiac | 3–0 |
| 6 | February 8, 2008 | Hamden, CT | Quinnipiac | 5–1 |
| 7 | January 31, 2009 | New Haven, CT | Yale | 3–0 |
| 8 | February 20, 2009 | Hamden, CT | Tie | 3–3 |
| 9 | December 4, 2009 | New Haven, CT | #10 Yale | 7–4 |
| 10 | February 27, 2010 | Hamden, CT | Quinnipiac | 4–3 |
| 11 | November 6, 2010 | New Haven, CT | #5 Yale | 5–1 |
| 12 | February 18, 2011 | Hamden, CT | #3 Yale | 6–1 |
| 13 | January 6, 2012 | New Haven, CT | Quinnipiac | 2–1 |
| 14 | February 25, 2012 | Hamden, CT | Tie | 2–2 |
| 15 | February 2, 2013 | New Haven, CT | #2 Quinnipiac | 6–2 |
| 16 | February 22, 2013 | Hamden, CT | #1 Quinnipiac | 4–1 |
| 17 | March 23, 2013 | Atlantic City, NJ | #1 Quinnipiac | 3–0 |
| 18 | April 13, 2013 | Pittsburgh, PA | #15 Yale | 4–0 |
| 19 | November 9, 2013 | Hamden, CT | Tie | 3–3 |
| 20 | February 14, 2014 | New Haven, CT | #4 Quinnipiac | 4–0 |
| 21 | March 14, 2014 | Hamden, CT | #6 Quinnipiac | 6–2 |
| 22 | March 15, 2014 | Hamden, CT | #6 Quinnipiac | 5–3 |
| 23 | January 31, 2015 | New Haven, CT | Tie | 2–2 |
| 24 | February 20, 2015 | Hamden, CT | Tie | 2–2 |
| 25 | December 4, 2015 | New Haven, CT | #2 Quinnipiac | 3–0 |

| No. | Date | Location | Winner | Score |
|---|---|---|---|---|
| 26 | February 27, 2016 | Hamden, CT | #1 Quinnipiac | 4–1 |
| 27 | February 4, 2017 | New Haven, CT | #19 Quinnipiac | 5–2 |
| 28 | February 24, 2017 | Hamden, CT | Quinnipiac | 3–2 |
| 29 | November 18, 2017 | Hamden, CT | Quinnipiac | 3–0 |
| 30 | February 9, 2018 | New Haven, CT | Yale | 3–2 |
| 31 | March 2, 2018 | New Haven, CT | Quinnipiac | 5–1 |
| 32 | March 3, 2018 | New Haven, CT | Quinnipiac | 4–1 |
| 33 | February 8, 2019 | Hamden, CT | #4 Quinnipiac | 4–0 |
| 34 | March 2, 2019 | New Haven, CT | #5 Quinnipiac | 4–1 |
| 35 | February 7, 2020 | New Haven, CT | #16 Quinnipiac | 3–2 |
| 36 | February 29, 2020 | Hamden, CT | #17 Quinnipiac | 5–0 |
| 37 | November 5, 2021 | New Haven, CT | #6 Quinnipiac | 3–0 |
| 38 | February 22, 2022 | Hamden, CT | #5 Quinnipiac | 4–0 |
| 39 | November 12, 2022 | New Haven, CT | #5 Quinnipiac | 4–0 |
| 40 | February 17, 2023 | Hamden, CT | #1 Quinnipiac | 5–1 |
| 41 | March 10, 2023 | Hamden, CT | #2 Quinnipiac | 3–0 |
| 42 | March 11, 2023 | Hamden, CT | #2 Quinnipiac | 6–2 |
| 43 | November 11, 2023 | Hamden, CT | #10 Quinnipiac | 5–2 |
| 44 | January 26, 2024 | Hartford, CT | #7 Quinnipiac | 1–0 |
| 45 | November 16, 2024 | New Haven, CT | #19 Quinnipiac | 4–1 |
| 46 | January 25, 2025 | Fairfield, CT | #15 Quinnipiac | 6–2 |
| 47 | February 21, 2025 | Hamden, CT | #14 Quinnipiac | 4–1 |
| 48 | November 7, 2025 | New Haven, CT | Yale | 4–2 |
| 49 | February 7, 2026 | Hamden, CT | Quinnipiac | 8–0 |
Series: Quinnipiac leads 36–8–5

== Series facts ==
| Statistic | Quinnipiac | Yale |
|---|---|---|
| Games played | 44 | |
| Wins | 32 | 7 |
| Home wins | 15 | 5 |
| Road wins | 14 | 1 |
| Neutral site wins | 2 | 1 |
| Most goals scored in a game by one team | 6 ('06, '07, '13, '14, '23) | 7 ('09) |
| Most goals in a game by both teams | 11 (2009 – Yale 7, Quinnipiac 4) | |
| Fewest goals in a game by both teams | 3 ('08, '09, '13, '15, '21) | |
| Fewest goals scored in a game by one team in a win | 2 ('12) | 3 ('09) |
| Most goals scored in a game by one team in a loss | 4 ('09) | 4 ('07) |
| Largest margin of victory | 5 ('20) | 5 ('09) |
| Smallest margin of victory | 1 ('10, '12, '17) | 1 ('06) |
| Longest winning streak | 14 ('18–Present) | 2 ('10–'11) |
| Longest unbeaten streak | 14 ('18–Present) | 3 ('09–'09) |

== See also ==
- College rivalry
- Quinnipiac Bobcats
- Yale Bulldogs
