= 2022–23 ECAC Hockey men's season =

- Season: 2022–23
- Conference: ECAC Hockey
- Division: Division I
- Sport: men's ice hockey
- Duration: October 1, 2022– February 25, 2023
- Number of teams: 12
- TV partner(s): ESPN+

NHL Entry Draft
- Top draft pick: Charles-Alexis Legault
- Picked by: Carolina Hurricanes

Regular Season
- Season champions: Quinnipiac
- Season MVP: Sean Farrell
- Top scorer: Sean Farrell

ECAC Hockey tournament
- Tournament champions: Colgate
- Runners-up: Harvard
- Tournament MVP: Carter Gylander
- Top scorer: Alex Laferriere (6); Collin Graf

NCAA tournament
- Bids: 4
- Record: 5–3
- Best Finish: National Champion
- Team(s): Quinnipiac

The 2022–23 ECAC Hockey men's season was the 62nd season of play for ECAC Hockey and took place during the 2022–23 NCAA Division I men's ice hockey season. The regular season began on October 1, 2022, and concluded on February 25, 2023. Colgate won the conference tournament on March 18, 2023, and received an automatic bid for the 2023 ECAC Hockey men's ice hockey tournament. Quinnipiac won the 2023 NCAA Division I men's ice hockey tournament, become the first conference member to win a national title since 2014.

== Season ==
Regular Sports Seasons

== Coaches ==
Josh Hauge takes over from interim head coach John Ronan after the mid-season resignation of Rick Bennett.

=== Records ===
Team	Head coach	Season at school	Record at school	ECAC Hockey record
Brown	Brendan Whittet	13	114–223–50	74–151–39
Clarkson	Casey Jones	12	200–152–51	103–77–32
Colgate	Don Vaughan	30	453–498–118	273–278–81
Cornell	Mike Schafer	27	499–271–103	310–162–78
Dartmouth	Reid Cashman	2	7–22–3	5–15–2
Harvard	Ted Donato	18	274–232–64	181–149–55
Princeton	Ron Fogarty	8	67–134–23	40–97–17
Quinnipiac	Rand Pecknold	28	581–322–100	200–119–51
Rensselaer	Dave Smith	5	51–88–12	34–49–5
St. Lawrence	Brent Brekke	4	21–54–15	13–36–10
Union	Josh Hauge	1	0–0–0	0–0–0
Yale	Keith Allain	16	258–195–45	174–135–29

== Standings ==
2022–23 ECAC Hockey Standings
	Conference record										Overall record					
	GP	W	L	T	OTW	OTL	SW	PTS	GF	GA	GP	W	L	T	GF	GA
#1 Quinnipiac †	22	20	2	0	0	0	0	60	87	30	41	34	4	3	162	64
#10 Harvard	22	18	4	0	5	0	0	49	86	48	34	24	8	2	125	81
#9 Cornell	22	15	6	1	0	1	0	47	78	42	34	21	11	2	112	66
St. Lawrence	22	12	10	0	1	2	0	37	56	58	36	17	19	0	88	102
#18 Colgate *	22	11	8	3	4	1	3	36	71	58	40	19	16	5	113	109
Clarkson	22	9	10	3	0	1	0	31	60	60	37	16	17	4	102	98
Rensselaer	22	9	13	0	2	1	0	26	52	74	35	14	20	1	84	115
Union	22	8	13	1	0	0	1	26	45	68	35	14	19	2	86	117
Princeton	22	8	14	0	2	1	0	26	57	73	32	13	19	0	89	112
Yale	22	6	14	2	0	1	1	22	35	62	32	8	20	4	57	94
Brown	22	5	14	3	0	1	1	20	41	69	30	9	18	3	65	91
Dartmouth	22	4	17	1	0	2	1	16	44	70	30	5	24	1	64	106
Championship: March 18, 2023 † indicates conference regular season champion (Cleary Cup) * indicates conference tournament champion (Whitelaw Cup); Rankings: USCHO.com Top 20 Poll

== Non-Conference record ==
Of the sixteen teams that are selected to participate in the NCAA tournament, ten will be via at-large bids. Those 10 teams are determined based upon the PairWise rankings. The rankings take into account all games played but are heavily affected by intra-conference results. The result is that teams from leagues which perform better in non-conference are much more likely to receive at-large bids even if they possess inferior records overall.

While the conference on the whole had losing records against three other leagues, two thirds of member teams were at or above .500 for their non-conference records. The result was that most of the ECAC teams were not adversely affected by the league's subpar record, resulting in the conference overperforming in the pairwise rankings when compared to both the CCHA and Hockey East.

=== Regular season record ===
Team	Atlantic Hockey	Big Ten	CCHA	Hockey East	Independent	NCHC	Total
Brown	1–0–0	0–0–0	0–0–0	2–2–0	1–1–0	0–0–0	4–3–0
Clarkson	1–1–1	1–0–0	1–1–0	1–3–0	2–0–0	0–0–0	6–5–1
Colgate	0–2–0	0–0–0	0–2–0	2–2–2	1–1–0	0–0–0	3–7–2
Cornell	2–0–1	0–0–0	0–0–0	1–1–0	0–0–0	0–2–0	3–3–1
Dartmouth	0–1–0	0–0–0	0–0–0	0–4–0	0–0–0	0–0–0	0–5–0
Harvard	0–0–0	0–1–1	0–0–0	3–1–1	0–0–0	0–0–0	3–2–2
Princeton	1–1–0	0–0–0	0–0–0	1–0–0	1–1–0	1–1–0	4–3–0
Quinnipiac	2–0–0	0–0–0	0–0–0	3–1–1	1–0–1	1–0–1	7–1–3
Rensselaer	3–1–0	0–0–0	0–2–0	1–1–0	1–1–1	0–0–0	5–5–1
St. Lawrence	1–1–0	0–0–0	0–2–0	1–3–0	0–0–0	3–1–0	5–7–0
Union	2–1–1	0–0–0	0–0–0	3–4–0	0–0–0	0–0–0	5–5–1
Yale	1–1–0	0–0–0	0–0–0	0–2–2	0–0–0	0–0–0	1–3–2
Overall	14–9–3	1–1–1	1–7–0	18–24–6	7–4–2	5–4–1	46–49–13

== Statistics ==
=== Leading scorers ===
GP = Games played; G = Goals; A = Assists; Pts = Points; PIM = Penalty minutes

Player	Class	Team	GP	G	A	Pts	PIM
Sean Farrell	Junior	Harvard	22	17	19	36	10
Collin Graf	Sophomore	Quinnipiac	22	14	19	33	2
Sam Lipkin	Freshman	Quinnipiac	21	11	18	29	6
Alex Young	Junior	Colgate	22	14	14	28	16
Alex Laferriere	Junior	Harvard	22	13	14	27	12
Matthew Coronato	Sophomore	Harvard	22	12	13	25	8
Ayrton Martino	Sophomore	Clarkson	22	7	15	22	22
Mathieu Gosselin	Senior	Clarkson	22	7	14	21	11
Matt Verboon	Senior	Colgate	22	11	9	20	19
Joe Miller	Freshman	Harvard	21	10	10	20	2
Ethan de Jong	Graduate	Quinnipiac	22	9	11	20	4
Ben Berard	Senior	Cornell	22	8	12	20	4
Sam Malinski	Senior	Cornell	22	7	13	20	27
Gabriel Seger	Junior	Cornell	19	5	15	20	17
Henry Thrun	Senior	Harvard	21	2	18	20	12

=== Leading goaltenders ===
Minimum 1/3 of team's minutes played in conference games.
GP = Games played; Min = Minutes played; W = Wins; L = Losses; T = Ties; GA = Goals against; SO = Shutouts; SV% = Save percentage; GAA = Goals against average

Player	Class	Team	GP	Min	W	L	T	GA	SO	SV%	GAA
Yaniv Perets	Junior	Quinnipiac	22	1242:51	20	2	0	26	6	.937	1.26
Ian Shane	Sophomore	Cornell	21	1177:36	14	6	0	36	3	.902	1.83
Luke Pearson	Sophomore	Yale	11	644:21	3	5	2	21	3	.930	1.96
Mitchell Gibson	Senior	Harvard	15	904:25	12	3	0	30	2	.914	1.99
Carter Gylander	Junior	Colgate	22	1336:32	11	8	3	54	1	.911	2.42

== ECAC tournament ==
Teams are reseeded for the semifinals

First Round; March 3–4
5	Colgate	5
12	Dartmouth	3
6	Clarkson	5
11	Brown	1
7	Rensselaer	1
10	Yale	4
8	Union	4
9	Princeton	6

Quarterfinals; March 10–12
1	Quinnipiac	3	6	-
10	Yale	0	2	-
2	Harvard	6	6	-
9	Princeton	1	1	-
3	Cornell	2	3	-
6	Clarkson	1	1	-
4	St. Lawrence	3	2	-
5	Colgate	4*	3	-

Semifinals; March 17
1	Quinnipiac	1
5	Colgate	2**
2	Harvard	1*
3	Cornell	0

Championship; March 18
5	Colgate	3
2	Harvard	2

Note: * denotes overtime period(s)

== NCAA tournament ==
=== Regional semifinal ===
==== Northeast ====
March 24, 2023; 5:30 PM	(1) Quinnipiac	5 – 0 (0–0, 2–0, 3–0)	(4) Merrimack	Total Mortgage Arena; Attendance: 4,462

Game reference

Yaniv Perets
Goalies
Zachary Borgiel
Referees:
Ryan Hersey
Joe Sullivan
Linesmen:
John Grandt
Tyler Liffrig

(Lee, McGee) Joey Cipollone (7) – GW – 21:56	1–0
(Lipkin, Graf) Jacob Quillan (15) – 23:29	2–0
(Metsa, Friedmann) Michael Lombardi (5) – 46:28	3–0
(Lipkin) Jacob Quillan (16) – 54:41	4–0
(de Jong, Johnson) Sam Lipkin (13) – EN – 58:31	5–0

4 min
Penalties
6 min
35
Shots
15

March 24, 2023; 2:00 PM	(2) Harvard	1 – 8 (0–2, 0–5, 1–1)	(3) Ohio State	Total Mortgage Arena; Attendance: 4,462

Game reference

(out 40:00, in 53:50) Mitchell Gibson
(in 40:00, out 53:50) Derek Mullahy
Goalies
Jakub Dobeš
Referees:
Dan Dreger
Nathan Wieler
Linesmen:
Justin Hills
Erik Contino

	0–1	03:22 – Cam Thiesing (14) (Westlund, Wise)
	0–2	18:24 – GW – Cole McWard (8) (Lohrei, Thiesing)
	0–3	23:44 – Gustaf Westlund (2) (Wise)
	0–4	23:50 – Cam Thiesing (15) (Westlund)
	0–5	28:24 – Mason Lohrei (4) (Halliday, Burnside)
	0–6	35:08 – Joe Dunlap (12) (Guzzo, Lohrei)
	0–7	36:59 – PP – Cole McWard (9) (Wise)
	0–8	41:10 – Patrick Guzzo (9) (Dunlap, Gildon)
(Farrell, Moore) John Farinacci (5) – PP – 56:46	1–8

12 min
Penalties
8 min
22
Shots
40

==== Midwest ====
March 24, 2023; 8:30 PM	(1) Michigan	11 – 1 (1–0, 7–0, 3–1)	(4) Colgate	PPL Center; Attendance: 7,067

Game reference

Erik Portillo
Goalies
Carter Gylander (out 36:54, in 52:52)
Andrew Takacs (in 36:54, out 52:52)
Referees:
Ryan Sweeney
Brendan Blanchard
Linesmen:
Brendan Lewis
Joe Sherman

(L. Hughes, Moyle) Nick Granowicz (4) – 09:40	1–0
(T. Hughes, Casey) Eric Ciccolini (7) – PP GW – 27:33	2–0
(unassisted) Adam Fantilli (28) – 28:18	3–0
(Hallum, Edwards) Frank Nazar (2) – 31:06	4–0
(L. Hughes, Pehrson) Mark Estapa (5) – 31:36	5–0
(A. Fantilli, Casey) Rutger McGroarty (16) – 32:31	6–0
(T. Hughes, Duke) Gavin Brindley (12) – 35:49	7–0
(unassisted) Luke Hughes (10) – SH – 36:54	8–0
	8–1	43:03 – Nic Belpedio (5) (C. Young)
(Brindley, Nazar) Luke Hughes (11) – PP – 50:17	9–1
(T. Hughes, Casey) Dylan Duke (18) – PP – 50:33	10–1
(L. Hughes, Samoskevich) Rutger McGroarty (16) – PP – 52:52	11–1

6 min
Penalties
19 min
52
Shots
21

==== East ====
March 23, 2023; 5:30 PM	(1) Denver	0 – 2 (0–2, 0–0, 0–0)	(4) Cornell	SNHU Arena; Attendance: 3,631

Game reference
Magnus Chrona	Goalies	Ian Shane	Referees: Andrew Bruggerman; Sean Fernandez; Linesmen: Tommy George; Jake Davis
0–1 / 02:49 – GW – Jack O'Leary (6) (Andreev, Stienburg); 0–2 / 11:28 – Ben Berard (11) (O'Leary)			Referees: Andrew Bruggerman; Sean Fernandez; Linesmen: Tommy George; Jake Davis
11 min	Penalties	7 min	Referees: Andrew Bruggerman; Sean Fernandez; Linesmen: Tommy George; Jake Davis
27	Shots	27	Referees: Andrew Bruggerman; Sean Fernandez; Linesmen: Tommy George; Jake Davis

=== Regional final ===
==== Northeast ====
March 26, 2023; 4:00 PM	(1) Quinnipiac	4 – 1 (2–1, 0–0, 2–0)	(3) Ohio State	Total Mortgage Arena; Attendance: 4,557

Game reference

Yaniv Perets
Goalies
Jakub Dobeš
Referees:
Ryan Hersey
Joe Sullivan
Linesmen:
John Grandt
Tyler Liffrig

	0–1	01:31 – Joe Dunlap (13) (unassisted)
(Czerneckianair, Tellier) Christophe Fillion (7) – 13:20	1–1
(Burgart, de Jong) Skyler Brind'Amour (14) – GW – 13:35	2–1
(Quillan, Fillion) Cristophe Tellier (7) – PP – 55:30	3–1
(Lipkin) Jayden Lee (4) – EN – 58:03	4–1

8 min
Penalties
8 min
17
Shots
35

==== Midwest ====
March 25, 2023; 4:00 PM	(2) Boston University	2 – 1 (0–0, 1–0, 1–1)	(4) Cornell	SNHU Arena; Attendance: 7,143

Game reference

Drew Commesso
Goalies
Ian Shane
Referees:
Colin Kronforst
Jonathon Sitarski
Linesmen:
Pat Richardson
Sam Shikowsky

(Wilmer) Wilmer Skoog (16) – 22:13	1–0
(Brown) Ethan Phillips (4) – GW – 47:26	2–0
	2–1	59:32 – Dalton Bancroft (9) (Mitchell, Seger)

6 min
Penalties
6 min
21
Shots
14

=== National semifinal ===
April 6, 2023; 8:30 PM	(NE1) Quinnipiac	5–2 (2–1, 0–1, 3–0)	(MW1) Michigan	Amalie Arena; Attendance: 19,119

Game reference

Yaniv Perets
Goalies
Erik Portillo
Referees:
Jeremy Tufts
Steven Rouillard
Linesmen:
Bill Kingdon
Kevin Briganti

(Lee, Tellier) Jacob Quillan – 5:18	1–0
	1–1	6:49 – Seamus Casey (unassisted)
(Lipkin, Graf) Jacob Quillan – 11:21	2–1
	2–2	30:15 – Adam Fantilli (Hughes, McGroarty)
(Graf, Quillan) Sam Lipkin – GW – 41:24	3–2
(Fillion, Tellier) Zach Metsa – 53:00	4–2
(unassisted) Ethan de Jong – EN – 58:15	5–2

6 min
Penalties
6 min
30
Shots
31

=== National Championship ===
April 8, 2023; 8:00 PM	(W1) Minnesota	2–3 (OT) (1–0, 1–1, 0–1, 0–1)	(NE1) Quinnipiac	Amalie Arena; Attendance: 19,444

Game reference
Referees: Joe Sullivan; Ryan Hersey; Linesmen: John Grandt; Tyler Liffrig

Scoring summary
Period	Team	Goal	Assist(s)	Time	Score
1st	MIN	John Mittelstadt (4)	Kurth	05:35	1–0 MIN
2nd	MIN	Jaxon Nelson (10)	Faber	25:24	2–0 MIN
2nd	QU	Cristophe Tellier (8)	Metsa	27:41	2–1 MIN
3rd	QU	Collin Graf (21) – EA	Metsa, Lipkin	57:13	2–2
1st Overtime	QU	Jacob Quillan (19) – GW	Lipkin, Metsa	60:10	3–2 QU
Penalty summary
Period	Team	Player	Penalty	Time	PIM
1st	QU	Skyler Brind'Amour	Contact to the Head	00:21	2:00
2nd	MIN	Jimmy Snuggerud	Tripping	32:32	2:00
3rd	QU	Skyler Brind'Amour	Hooking	43:17	2:00
3rd	MIN	Logan Cooley	High-sticking	55:08	2:00

Shots by period
Team	1	2	3	OT	T
Quinnipiac	4	11	14	1	30
Minnesota	7	6	2	0	15

Goaltenders
Team	Name	Saves	Goals against	Time on ice
QU	Yaniv Perets	13	2	59:29
MIN	Justen Close	27	3	60:10

== Ranking ==
=== USCHO ===
Team	Pre	1	2	3	4	5	6	7	8	9	10	11	12	13	14	15	16	17	18	19	20	21	22	23	24	25	26	Final
Brown	NR	-	NR	NR	NR	NR	NR	NR	NR	NR	NR	NR	NR	-	NR	NR	NR	NR	NR	NR	NR	NR	NR	NR	NR	NR	-	NR
Clarkson	18	-	17	NR	NR	NR	NR	NR	NR	NR	NR	NR	NR	-	NR	NR	NR	NR	NR	NR	NR	NR	NR	NR	NR	NR	-	NR
Colgate	NR	-	NR	NR	NR	NR	NR	NR	NR	NR	NR	NR	NR	-	NR	NR	NR	NR	NR	NR	NR	NR	NR	NR	NR	19	-	18
Cornell	19	-	19	19	20	20	NR	NR	NR	NR	NR	NR	NR	-	18	15	16	11	11	11	11	13	12	12	10	12	-	9
Dartmouth	NR	-	NR	NR	NR	NR	NR	NR	NR	NR	NR	NR	NR	-	NR	NR	NR	NR	NR	NR	NR	NR	NR	NR	NR	NR	-	NR
Harvard	11	-	12	12	15	14	15	13	10	9	7	9	9	-	10	9	9	10	8	10	9	7	5	6	6	7	-	10
Princeton	NR	-	NR	NR	NR	NR	NR	NR	NR	NR	NR	NR	NR	-	NR	NR	NR	NR	NR	NR	NR	NR	NR	NR	NR	NR	-	NR
Quinnipiac	7	-	6	8	3	7	7	5	5	4	2	2	2	-	2	1	1	3	2	2	1	2	2	2	2	3	-	1
Rensselaer	NR	-	NR	NR	NR	NR	NR	NR	NR	NR	NR	NR	NR	-	NR	NR	NR	NR	NR	NR	NR	NR	NR	NR	NR	NR	-	NR
St. Lawrence	NR	-	NR	NR	NR	NR	NR	NR	NR	NR	NR	NR	NR	-	NR	NR	NR	NR	NR	NR	NR	NR	NR	NR	NR	NR	-	NR
Union	NR	-	NR	NR	NR	NR	NR	NR	NR	NR	NR	NR	NR	-	NR	NR	NR	NR	NR	NR	NR	NR	NR	NR	NR	NR	-	NR
Yale	NR	-	NR	NR	NR	NR	NR	NR	NR	NR	NR	NR	NR	-	NR	NR	NR	NR	NR	NR	NR	NR	NR	NR	NR	NR	-	NR

=== USA Today ===
Team	Pre	1	2	3	4	5	6	7	8	9	10	11	12	13	14	15	16	17	18	19	20	21	22	23	24	25	26	Final
Brown	NR	NR	NR	NR	NR	NR	NR	NR	NR	NR	NR	NR	NR	NR	NR	NR	NR	NR	NR	NR	NR	NR	NR	NR	NR	NR	NR	NR
Clarkson	17	17	17	NR	NR	NR	NR	NR	NR	NR	NR	NR	NR	NR	NR	NR	NR	NR	NR	NR	NR	NR	NR	NR	NR	NR	NR	NR
Colgate	NR	NR	NR	NR	NR	NR	NR	NR	NR	NR	NR	NR	NR	NR	NR	NR	NR	NR	NR	NR	NR	NR	NR	NR	NR	19	20	20
Cornell	19	19	19	19	19	20	NR	NR	NR	NR	NR	20	20	NR	17	14	12	11	11	11	11	13	13	13	11	12	9	9
Dartmouth	NR	NR	NR	NR	NR	NR	NR	NR	NR	NR	NR	NR	NR	NR	NR	NR	NR	NR	NR	NR	NR	NR	NR	NR	NR	NR	NR	NR
Harvard	11	11	10	12	15	13	15	12	11	9	9	9	9	9	9	9	9	10	8	10	10	9	5	5	6	7	10	10
Princeton	NR	NR	NR	NR	NR	NR	NR	NR	NR	NR	NR	NR	NR	NR	NR	NR	NR	NR	NR	NR	NR	NR	NR	NR	NR	NR	NR	NR
Quinnipiac	7	7	7	7	3	6	6	5	4	4	4	3	3	3	3	1	1	4	2	2	1	2	2	2	2	3	3	1
Rensselaer	NR	NR	NR	NR	NR	NR	NR	NR	NR	NR	NR	NR	NR	NR	NR	NR	NR	NR	NR	NR	NR	NR	NR	NR	NR	NR	NR	NR
St. Lawrence	NR	NR	NR	NR	NR	NR	NR	NR	NR	NR	NR	NR	NR	NR	NR	NR	NR	NR	NR	NR	NR	NR	NR	NR	NR	NR	NR	NR
Union	NR	NR	NR	NR	NR	NR	NR	NR	NR	NR	NR	NR	NR	NR	NR	NR	NR	NR	NR	NR	NR	NR	NR	NR	NR	NR	NR	NR
Yale	NR	NR	NR	NR	NR	NR	NR	NR	NR	NR	NR	NR	NR	NR	NR	NR	NR	NR	NR	NR	NR	NR	NR	NR	NR	NR	NR	NR

=== Pairwise ===
Team	2	3	4	5	6	7	8	9	10	11	12	14	15	16	17	18	19	20	21	22	23	24	Final
Brown	22	50	56	57	61	52	60	59	49	47	46	44	44	37	38	40	45	45	45	48	47	47	47
Clarkson	22	37	47	48	46	48	42	32	33	42	44	36	36	35	35	37	38	37	30	30	31	31	31
Colgate	22	46	52	50	49	49	48	45	44	39	42	38	38	39	29	28	36	37	37	37	32	28	25
Cornell	22	50	56	57	59	53	46	37	20	19	18	17	11	14	10	11	12	10	14	13	14	12	13
Dartmouth	22	50	56	57	58	54	59	60	59	59	61	60	60	61	54	56	60	59	59	60	60	60	60
Harvard	22	50	56	57	1	1	16	6	9	15	13	9	9	9	10	8	10	10	10	7	6	6	7
Princeton	22	50	56	57	60	61	50	54	41	44	40	43	36	30	33	37	33	39	42	36	43	44	44
Quinnipiac	22	5	9	14	16	14	9	8	3	2	2	2	2	2	4	2	2	2	2	2	2	2	2
Rensselaer	22	22	8	20	26	40	39	44	37	43	45	47	46	47	47	50	47	51	50	49	51	51	51
St. Lawrence	22	25	30	27	40	30	39	41	41	41	34	39	38	39	43	35	34	33	29	28	30	32	31
Union	1	17	27	26	33	36	32	35	34	32	42	39	45	45	44	44	39	35	42	38	41	42	43
Yale	22	50	56	57	61	60	61	61	61	61	59	61	57	52	56	60	54	59	56	57	53	54	54

Note: teams ranked in the top-10 automatically qualify for the NCAA tournament. Teams ranked 11-16 can qualify based upon conference tournament results.

== Awards ==
=== NCAA ===
AHCA East All-American First Team
Player	Position	Team
Henry Thrun	D	Harvard
Sean Farrell	F	Harvard
Collin Graf	F	Quinnipiac
AHCA East All-American Second Team
Yaniv Perets	G	Quinnipiac
Sam Malinski	D	Cornell
Zach Metsa	D	Quinnipiac
Matthew Coronato	F	Harvard

==== NCAA tournament ====
Tournament MOP
Jacob Quillan		Quinnipiac
NCAA All-Tournament Team
Player	Pos	Team
Yaniv Perets	G	Quinnipiac
Zach Metsa	D	Quinnipiac
Collin Graf	F	Quinnipiac
Jacob Quillan	F	Quinnipiac

=== ECAC Hockey ===
Award		Recipient
Player of the Year		Sean Farrell, Harvard
Best Defensive Forward		Skyler Brind’Amour, Quinnipiac
Best Defensive Defenseman		Henry Thrun, Harvard
Rookie of the Year		Sam Lipkin, Quinnipiac
Ken Dryden Award		Yaniv Perets, Quinnipiac
Student-Athlete of the Year		Matt Verboon, Colgate
Tim Taylor Award		Rand Pecknold, Quinnipiac
Most Outstanding Player in Tournament		Carter Gylander, Colgate
All-ECAC Hockey Teams
First Team	Position	Second Team
Yaniv Perets, Quinnipiac	G	Mitchell Gibson, Harvard
Henry Thrun, Harvard	D	Zach Metsa, Quinnipiac
Sam Malinski, Cornell	D	Luc Salem, St. Lawrence
Collin Graf, Quinnipiac	F	Matthew Coronato, Harvard
Sean Farrell, Harvard	F	Alex Laferriere, Harvard
Alex Young, Colgate	F	Ethan de Jong, Quinnipiac
Third Team	Position	Rookie Team
Mathieu Caron, Brown	G	Cooper Black, Dartmouth
Noah Beck, Clarkson	D	John Prokop, Union
Tanner Palocsik, Dartmouth	D	Ryan Healey, Harvard
Ayrton Martino, Clarkson	F	Sam Lipkin, Quinnipiac
Mathieu Gosselin, Clarkson	F	Joe Miller, Harvard
Skyler Brind'Amour, Quinnipiac	F	Sutter Muzzatti, Rensselaer

==== Conference tournament ====
Tournament MOP
Carter Gylander		Colgate
All-Tournament Team
Player	Pos	Team
Carter Gylander	G	Colgate
Henry Thrun	D	Harvard
Zach Metsa	D	Quinnipiac
Ross Mitton	F	Colgate
Alex Young	F	Colgate
Alex Laferriere	F	Harvard

== 2023 NHL entry draft ==
Round	Pick	Player	College	NHL team
3	70	Jonathan Castagna^{†}	Cornell	Arizona Coyotes
3	92	Christopher Pelosi^{†}	Quinnipiac	Boston Bruins
4	108	Hoyt Stanley^{†}	Cornell	Ottawa Senators
5	139	Charles-Alexis Legault	Quinnipiac	Carolina Hurricanes
5	143	Sutter Muzzatti	Rensselaer	Nashville Predators
6	169	Rudy Guimond^{†}	Yale	Detroit Red Wings
6	173	Sean Keohane^{†}	Harvard	Buffalo Sabres
6	188	Ryan Walsh^{†}	Cornell	Boston Bruins

† incoming freshman
