= 2023 ECAC Hockey men's ice hockey tournament =

Ice hockey tournament

2023 ECAC Men's ice hockey tournament
- Dates: March 3–18, 2023
- Teams: 12
- Finals site: Herb Brooks Arena; Lake Placid, New York
- Champions: Colgate (2nd title)
- Winning coach: Don Vaughan (1st title)
- MVP: Carter Gylander (Colgate)
- ECAC Men's Ice Hockey Tournaments

The 2023 ECAC Hockey men's ice hockey tournament was the 62nd tournament in league history. It was played between March 3 and March 18, 2023. By winning the tournament, Colgate received ECAC Hockey's automatic bid to the 2023 NCAA Division I men's ice hockey tournament.

== Format ==
The tournament features four rounds of play. The teams that finish above fifth place in the standings received a bye to the quarterfinal round. In the first round, the fifth and twelfth seeds, the sixth and eleventh seeds, the seventh and tenth seeds and the eighth and ninth seeds played a single-elimination game with the winners advancing to the quarterfinals. In the quarterfinals the one seed played the lowest remaining seed, the second seed played the second-lowest remaining seed, the third seed played the third-lowest remaining seed and the fourth seed played the fourth-lowest remaining seed each in a best-of-three series with the winners of these the series advancing to the semifinals. In the semifinals the top remaining seed played the lowest remaining seed while the two remaining teams play against each other. The winners of the semifinals play in the championship game, and no third-place game is played. All series after the quarterfinals are single-elimination games. The tournament champion receives an automatic bid to the 2023 NCAA Division I Men's Ice Hockey Tournament.

== Conference standings ==
2022–23 ECAC Hockey Standings
	Conference record										Overall record					
	GP	W	L	T	OTW	OTL	SW	PTS	GF	GA	GP	W	L	T	GF	GA
#1 Quinnipiac †	22	20	2	0	0	0	0	60	87	30	41	34	4	3	162	64
#10 Harvard	22	18	4	0	5	0	0	49	86	48	34	24	8	2	125	81
#9 Cornell	22	15	6	1	0	1	0	47	78	42	34	21	11	2	112	66
St. Lawrence	22	12	10	0	1	2	0	37	56	58	36	17	19	0	88	102
#18 Colgate *	22	11	8	3	4	1	3	36	71	58	40	19	16	5	113	109
Clarkson	22	9	10	3	0	1	0	31	60	60	37	16	17	4	102	98
Rensselaer	22	9	13	0	2	1	0	26	52	74	35	14	20	1	84	115
Union	22	8	13	1	0	0	1	26	45	68	35	14	19	2	86	117
Princeton	22	8	14	0	2	1	0	26	57	73	32	13	19	0	89	112
Yale	22	6	14	2	0	1	1	22	35	62	32	8	20	4	57	94
Brown	22	5	14	3	0	1	1	20	41	69	30	9	18	3	65	91
Dartmouth	22	4	17	1	0	2	1	16	44	70	30	5	24	1	64	106
Championship: March 18, 2023 † indicates conference regular season champion (Cleary Cup) * indicates conference tournament champion (Whitelaw Cup); Rankings: USCHO.com Top 20 Poll

== Bracket ==
Teams are reseeded for the semifinals

First Round; March 3–4
5	Colgate	5
12	Dartmouth	3
6	Clarkson	5
11	Brown	1
7	Rensselaer	1
10	Yale	4
8	Union	4
9	Princeton	6

Quarterfinals; March 10–12
1	Quinnipiac	3	6	-
10	Yale	0	2	-
2	Harvard	6	6	-
9	Princeton	1	1	-
3	Cornell	2	3	-
6	Clarkson	1	1	-
4	St. Lawrence	3	2	-
5	Colgate	4*	3	-

Semifinals; March 17
1	Quinnipiac	1
5	Colgate	2**
2	Harvard	1*
3	Cornell	0

Championship; March 18
5	Colgate	3
2	Harvard	2

Note: * denotes overtime period(s)

== Results ==
Note: All game times are local.

=== First Round ===
==== (5) Colgate vs. (12) Dartmouth ====
March 3, 2023; 7:00 PM	Colgate	5–3 (2–1, 1–0, 2–2)	Dartmouth	Class of 1965 Arena; Attendance: 926

Game reference

Carter Gylander
Goalies
Cooper Black
Referees:
Chris Pitoscia
Tom Dellafranco
Linesmen:
Patrick Dapuzzo
Rick Lembo

	0–1	02:37 – Brady MacDonald (1) (Musa, Flinton)
(McGuire, Belpedio) Ben Raymond (5) – 04:05	1–1
(Panetta, Bergsland) Simon Labelle (4) – 08:30	2–1
(unassisted) Colton Young (9) – SH – 25:48	3–1
(Anderson, Manderville) Matt Verboon (15) – GW PP – 47:49	4–1
(Martino, McFaul) Alex DiPaolo (1) – PP – 49:55	5–1
	5–2	51:30 – EA – Sean Chisholm (7) (Palocsik, Hubbarde)
	5–3	52:45 – PP – Luke Haymes (11) (Dorfman, Chisholm)

8 min
Penalties
34 min
20
Shots
24

==== (6) Clarkson vs. (11) Brown ====
March 4, 2023; 4:00 PM	Clarkson	5–1 (1–0, 1–0, 3–1)	Brown	Cheel Arena; Attendance: 2,527

Game reference

Ethan Haider
Goalies
Mathieu Caron
Referees:
Joe Carusone
Jason Williams
Linesmen:
Adam Wood
Jason Shattie

(Campbell, Power) Noah Beck (6) – 06:51	1–0
(Callin, McFaul) Anthony Romano (8) – GW – 25:31	2–0
	2–1	40:21 – Jordan Tonelli (7) (Puskar, Bottrill)
(unassisted) Anthony Romano (9) – 44:34	3–1
(Gosselin) Ryan Richardson (5) – EN – 59:22	4–1
(Martino, McFaul) Luke Mobley (1) – PP – 59:48	5–1

2 min
Penalties
4 min
34
Shots
27

==== (7) Rensselaer vs. (10) Yale ====
March 4, 2023; 7:00 PM	Rensselaer	1–4 (1–2, 0–1, 0–1)	Yale	Houston Field House; Attendance: 1,556

Game reference

Jack Watson
Goalies
Luke Pearson
Referees:
Tom Steinel
Cameron Lynch
Linesmen:
Ryan Knapp
Stephen Drain

	0–1	06:17 – Connor Sullivan (1) (Allain)
	0–2	12:53 – GW – Reilly Connors (5) (O'Hearn, Wooding)
(Gagnon, Muzzatti) Ryan Mahshie (15) – 14:17	1–2
	1–3	24:13 – Reilly Connors (6) (Carpentier, Wooding)
	1–4	57:47 – EN – David Chen (8) (Gammill, Pearson)

4 min
Penalties
2 min
26
Shots
26

==== (8) Union vs. (9) Princeton ====
March 4, 2023; 4:00 PM	Union	4–6 (1–2, 2–2, 1–2)	Princeton	Achilles Rink; Attendance: 2,119

Game reference

Connor Murphy
Goalies
Aidan Porter
Referees:
Anthony Kenney
CJ Hanafin
Linesmen:
Brendon Wormley
Phil Kitchen

	0–1	09:40 – Ian Murphy (14) (Ma)
	0–2	12:01 – Jack Cronin (5) (Murphy, Gorman)
(Villegas, Young) Josh Nixon (10) – 19:07	1–2
	1–3	25:12 – Pito Walton (7) (de la Durantaye, Gorman)
	1–4	25:53 – Ian Murphy (8) (Gammill, Pearson)
(Watkins, Mell) Caden Villegas (7) – PP – 29:28	2–4
(Watkins) Ville Immonen (3) – SH – 32:28	3–4
(Theodore, Snell) Josh Nixon (11) – PP – 48:56	4–4
	4–5	55:57 – GW – Spencer Kersten (3) (Rubin, Kennedy)
	4–6	58:40 – Spencer Kersten (4) (unassisted)

2 min
Penalties
8 min
35
Shots
27

=== Quarterfinals ===
==== (1) Quinnipiac vs. (10) Yale ====
March 10, 2023; 7:00 PM	Quinnipiac	3–0 (0–0, 2–0, 1–0)	Yale	M&T Bank Arena; Attendance: 3,211

Game reference

Yaniv Perets
Goalies
Luke Pearson
Referees:
Tom Steinel
Chris Pitoscia
Linesmen:
Ryan Knapp
John Rey

(Graf, Lipkin) Jacob Quillan (13) – GW – 21:52	1–0
(Graf) Iivari Räsänen (2) – 33:01	2–0
(de Jong, Graf) Zach Metsa (4) – PP – 40:18	3–0

13 min
Penalties
27 min
30
Shots
5

March 11, 2023; 7:00 PM	Quinnipiac	6–2 (2–0, 2–1, 2–1)	Yale	M&T Bank Arena; Attendance: 3,178

Game reference

Yaniv Perets (out 57:09)
Chase Clark (in 57:09)
Goalies
Luke Pearson
Referees:
Tom Dellafranco
William Brennan III
Linesmen:
John Rey
Phil Kitchen

(Lee, Friedmann) Michael Lombardi (9) – 02:41	1–0
(Metsa, Brind'Amour) Collin Graf (20) – 18:29	2–0
(Lee, Nordqvist) Cristophe Tellier (6) – PP GW – 23:17	3–0
(Graf, Legault) Jacob Quillan (14) – 31:51	4–0
	4–1	32:10 – Quinton Ong (4) (Herzog)
	4–2	40:58 – SH – Reilly Connors (7) (Wagner, Hall)
(Brind'Amour, Metsa) Ethan de Jong (17) – SH – 48:14	5–2
(Brind'Amour) Zach Metsa (4) – 51:31	6–2

6 min
Penalties
14 min
30
Shots
20

Quinnipiac Won Series 2–0

==== (2) Harvard vs. (9) Princeton ====
March 10, 2023; 7:00 PM	Harvard	6–1 (2–0, 1–1, 3–0)	Princeton	Bright-Landry Hockey Center; Attendance: 1,671

Game reference

Mitchell Gibson
Goalies
Aidan Porter
Referees:
Tom Dellafranco
Jason Williams
Linesmen:
Patrick Dapuzzo
Jason Shattie

(Thrun, Siedem) Sean Farrell (19) – 03:39	1–0
(Farinacci, Miller) Alex Laferriere (17) – GW – 12:04	2–0
	2–1	27:51 – David Jacobs (6) (Seitz, Rubin)
(Farinacci, Coronato) Alex Laferriere (18) – PP – 36:19	3–1
(Siedem, Coronato) Sean Farrell (20) – 40:33	4–1
(Thrun) Marek Hejduk (6) – 51:53	5–1
(unassisted) Henry Thrun (6) – SH EN – 56:15	6–1

8 min
Penalties
4 min
30
Shots
32

March 11, 2023; 7:00 PM	Harvard	6–1 (2–0, 2–0, 2–1)	Princeton	Bright-Landry Hockey Center; Attendance: 1,640

Game reference

Mitchell Gibson
Goalies
Aidan Porter
Referees:
Anthony Kenney
Jason Williams
Linesmen:
Jason Shattie
Brendon Wormley

(Shore, Hejduk) Ryan Drkulec (4) – 02:13	1–0
(Farinacci, Thrun) Alex Laferriere (18) – GW – 16:49	2–0
(Siedem, Farrell) Zakary Karpa (5) – 34:47	3–0
(Miller, Farinacci) Alex Laferriere (20) – 36:47	4–0
(unassisted) Baker Shore (4) – SH EN – 50:18	5–0
(Farrell) Philip Tresca (4) – 52:37	6–0
	6–1	58:58 – Matt Hayami (6) (Konovalov)

26 min
Penalties
18 min
33
Shots
35

Harvard Won Series 2–0

==== (3) Cornell vs. (6) Clarkson ====
March 10, 2023; 7:00 PM	Cornell	2–1 (1–0, 0–0, 1–1)	Clarkson	Lynah Rink; Attendance: 3,752

Game reference

Ian Shane
Goalies
Ethan Haider
Referees:
CJ Hanafin
Joseph Carusone
Linesmen:
Rick Lembo
Adam Wood

(Bancroft, Malinski) Gabriel Seger (7) – PP – 06:01	1–0
(O'Leary, Tupker) Michael Suda (1) – GW – 41:13	2–0
	2–1	45:15 – EA – Mathieu Gosselin (14) (Richardson, Power)

8 min
Penalties
19 min
20
Shots
14

March 11, 2023; 7:00 PM	Cornell	3–1 (0–0, 1–0, 2–1)	Clarkson	Lynah Rink; Attendance: 3,935

Game reference

Ian Shane
Goalies
Ethan Haider
Referees:
CJ Hanafin
Tom Steinel
Linesmen:
Ryan Knapp
Adam Wood

(Seger, Bancroft) Max Andreev (6) – PP – 28:30	1–0
(Malone, Wallace) Ondrej Psenicka (8) – GW – 52:57	2–0
(Penney, Mitchell) Jack Malone (8) – EN – 58:02	3–0
	3–1	59:39 – EA – Tommy Pasanen (14) (Taylor, Bargholtz)

10 min
Penalties
16 min
22
Shots
23

Cornell Won Series 2–0

==== (4) St. Lawrence vs. (5) Colgate ====
March 10, 2023; 7:00 PM	St. Lawrence	3–4 (OT) (3–0, 0–2, 0–1, 0–1)	Colgate	Appleton Arena; Attendance: 2,848

Game reference

Emil Zetterquist
Goalies
Carter Gylander
Referees:
Cameron Lynch
Douglas Place
Linesmen:
Michael Wrobel
Stephen Drain

(Buhl, Mazura) Mason Waite (2) – 09:13	1–0
(Lašák, Dorrington) Tucker McIntosh (3) – 12:21	2–0
(Lašák) Aleksi Peltonen (6) – 14:34	3–0
	3–1	28:02 – PP – Alex Young (20) (C. Young)
	3–2	33:33 – Reid Irwin (1) (Bergsland)
	3–3	50:52 – Daniel Panetta (4) (Anderson, C. Young)
	3–4	71:33 – GW – Colton Young (6) (Mitton, Bergsland)

10 min
Penalties
6 min
31
Shots
37

March 11, 2023; 7:00 PM	St. Lawrence	2–3 (0–1, 1–2, 1–0)	Colgate	Appleton Arena; Attendance: 2,318

Game reference

Emil Zetterquist
Goalies
Carter Gylander
Referees:
Joseph Carusone
Cameron Lynch
Linesmen:
Rick Lembo
Stephen Drain

	0–1	16:47 – PP – Ethan Manderville (20) (Verboon, Anderson)
	0–2	20:45 – Alex DiPaolo (11) (unassisted)
	0–3	27:07 – GW – Matt Verboon (16) (Panetta)
(unassisted) Mason Waite (3) – 29:27	1–3
(Salem, Buhl) Ty Naaykens (3) – EA – 57:28	2–3

22 min
Penalties
19 min
33
Shots
19

Colgate Won Series 2–0

=== Semifinals ===
==== (1) Quinnipiac vs. (5) Colgate ====
March 17, 2023; 4:00 PM	Quinnipiac	1–2 (2OT) (0–1, 0–0, 1–0, 0–0, 0–1)	Colgate	Herb Brooks Arena; Attendance: 3,533

Game reference

Yaniv Perets
Goalies
Carter Gylander
Referees:
CJ Hanafin
Tom Steinel
Linesmen:
Ryan Knapp
Adam Wood

	0–1	16:48 – Daniel Panetta (5) (Glasman)
(Graf, Metsa) Ethan de Jong (18) – PP – 43:47	1–1
	1–2	88:50 – GW – Ross Mitton (9) (DiPaolo, Verboon)

21 min
Penalties
10 min
41
Shots
47

==== (2) Harvard vs. (3) Cornell ====
March 17, 2023; 7:30 PM	Harvard	1–0 (OT) (0–0, 0–0, 0–0, 1–0)	Cornell	Herb Brooks Arena; Attendance: 3,533

Game reference
Mitchell Gibson	Goalies	Ian Shane	Referees: Joe Carusone; Chris Pitoscia; Linesmen: Jason Shattie; Patrick Dapuzzo
(Shore, Miller) Alex Laferriere (21) – GW – 64:28 / 1–0			Referees: Joe Carusone; Chris Pitoscia; Linesmen: Jason Shattie; Patrick Dapuzzo
2 min	Penalties	2 min	Referees: Joe Carusone; Chris Pitoscia; Linesmen: Jason Shattie; Patrick Dapuzzo
25	Shots	15	Referees: Joe Carusone; Chris Pitoscia; Linesmen: Jason Shattie; Patrick Dapuzzo

=== Championship ===
==== (2) Harvard vs. (5) Colgate ====
March 18, 2023; 7:30 PM	Harvard	2–3 (0–2, 1–1, 1–0)	Colgate	Herb Brooks Arena; Attendance: 3,839

Game reference

Mitchell Gibson
Goalies
Carter Gylander
Referees:
CJ Hanafin
Cameron Lynch
Linesmen:
Ryan Knapp
Stephen Drain

	0–1	01:01 – PP – Colton Young (11) (Manderville, A. Young)
	0–2	12:47 – Alex Young (21) (unassisted)
(Miller, Laferriere) Henry Thrun (7) – 26:01	1–2
	1–3	29:38 – GW – Levi Glasman (3) (Anderson, Labelle)
(Farinacci, Farrell) Matthew Coronato (20) – PP – 52:55	2–3

2 min
Penalties
8 min
36
Shots
23

== Tournament awards ==
=== All-Tournament Team ===
- F Ross Mitton (Colgate)
- F Alex Young (Colgate)
- F Alex Laferriere (Harvard)
- D Henry Thrun (Harvard)
- D Zach Metsa (Quinnipiac)
- G Carter Gylander* (Colgate)

* Most Outstanding Player(s)
