= 2022–23 St. Lawrence Saints men's ice hockey season =

American university hockey season

- Conference: 4th ECAC Hockey
- Home ice: Appleton Arena

Rankings
- USCHO: NR
- USA Today: NR

Record
- Overall: 17–19–0
- Conference: 11–9–0
- Home: 11–7–0
- Road: 6–12–0

Coaches and captains
- Head coach: Brent Brekke
- Assistant coaches: Tommy Hill
- Captain(s): Tim Makowski; Aleksi Peltonen; Jordan Steinmetz

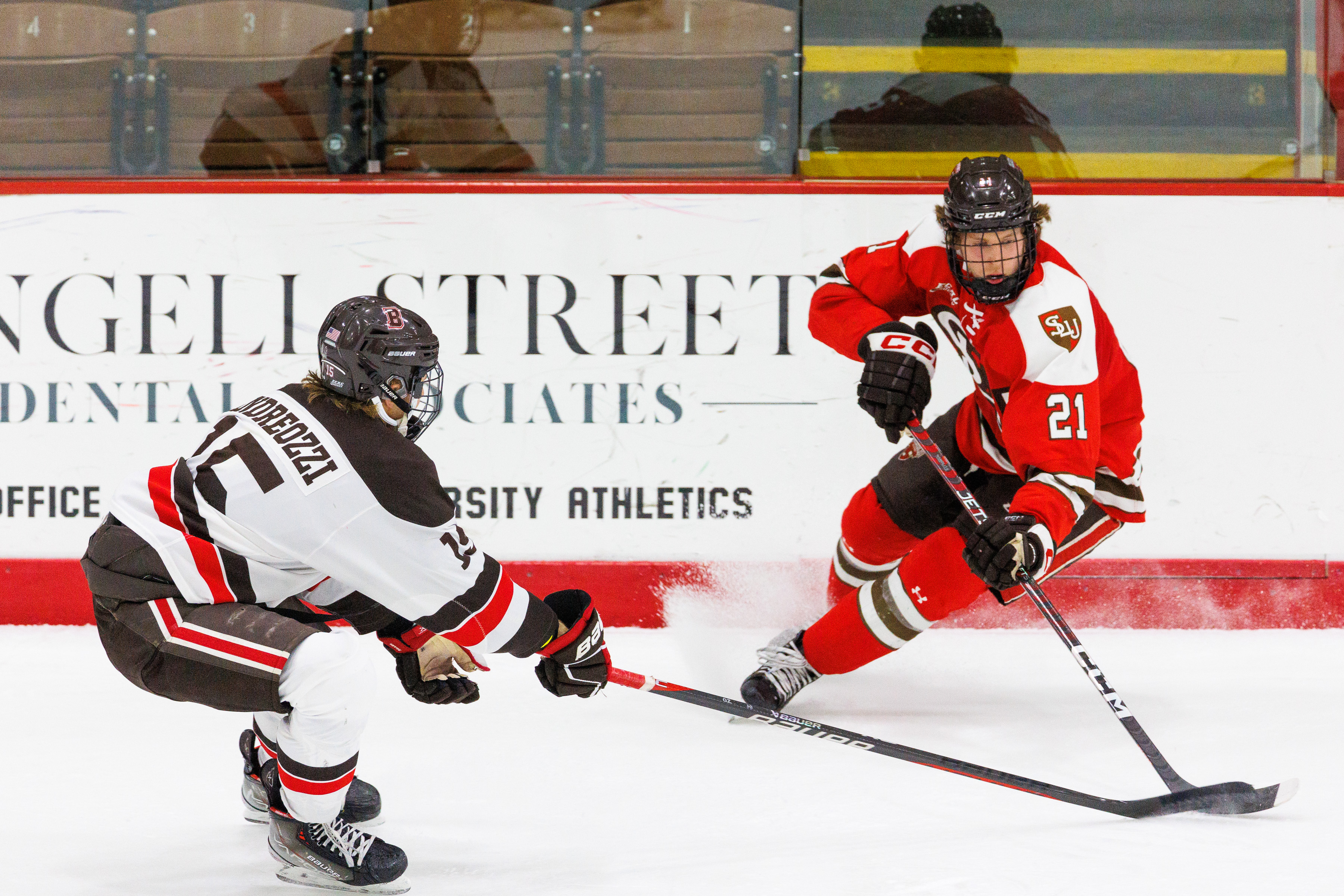
The Saints' Cameron Buhl and Brown's Tony Andreozzi

The 2022–23 St. Lawrence Saints Men's ice hockey season was the 83rd season of play for the program and the 62nd in the ECAC Hockey conference. The Saints represented St. Lawrence University and were coached by Brent Brekke, in his fourth season.

== Season ==
Backstopped by Emil Zetterquist for a third season as the team's starting goaltender, the Saints began the season playing up and down hockey. St. Lawrence went 3–4 in October, however, they didn't have a single 1-goal game in any of those matches. The team stopped that wild inconsistency come November, however, they found wins harder to come by and posted a 4-game losing streak. The offense, which had been bad in 2022, was only marginally better in '23. The team's scoring did increase as the season went along but would still end up averaging less than two and a half goals per game.

Due to expected heavy snowfall in the Buffalo area, the game against Niagara was moved from November 19 to January 5.

After matching the losing skid with a 4-game winning streak, St. Lawrence entered the winter break as a .500 team but, with ECAC Hockey in a 3-team race, there was room for the Larries to earn the last bye into the conference quarterfinals. As they were rounding out their non-conference slate, the Saints finally found someone who could lead the offense. Surprisingly, it was junior defenseman Luc Salem. After scoring 8 points in the first 18 games, Salem took off in the second half and recorded 18 points in the final 12 games to end the regular season. The added offense was needed as it allowed the Larries to catch and pass a fading Colgate towards the end of the year. At the end, St. Lawrence finished 1 point ahead of Colgate and earned a home site for the quarterfinals.

As they entered the postseason, St. Lawrence was sitting in a good position; The team was 11–5 at home and would play host to the Raiders, who had won just 3 of their previous 11 games. The Larries got off to a tremendous start by scoring 3 goals in the first and looked primed to take a 1-game lead. The team fired 17 shots on goal in the second, looking to increase their advantage, unfortunately, Carter Gylander stopped everything in the middle frame and enabled Colgate to close the gap with a pair of markers. The surging Raiders erased the Saints 3–0 advantage midway through the third and then scored in overtime to take the first game. Perhaps still feeling the effects of the previous game, St. Lawrence was slow to start in the rematch and surrendered the first three markers. After falling behind, the Larries charged back, outshooting Colgate 27–6 over the final two periods. However, despite their efforts, the Saints could only manage to score twice and were swept out of the playoffs.

== Departures ==
Player	Position	Nationality	Cause
Jeff Clarke	Defenseman	Canada	Graduation (retired)
David Jankowski	Forward	Canada	Graduate transfer to Michigan Tech
Chris Pappas	Forward	Canada	Transferred to Long Island
Kaden Pickering	Forward	United States	Graduate transfer to Bemidji State

== Recruiting ==
Player	Position	Nationality	Age	Notes
Tyler Cristall	Forward	Canada	20	North Vancouver, BC
Fēlikss Gavars	Forward	Latvia	20	Riga, LAT
Ján Lašák	Forward	Slovakia	20	Banska Stiavnica, SVK
Tomáš Mazura	Forward	Czech Republic	22	Pardubice, CZE; selected 162nd overall in 2019; transfer from Providence
Anthony Mollica	Defenseman	United States	21	Jenison, MI

== Roster ==
As of September 19, 2022.

No.	Nat.	Player	Class	Pos	Height	Weight	DoB	Hometown	Previous team	NHL rights
1	(Canada)	Emil Zetterquist	Graduate	G	6' 1" (1.85 m)	190 lb (86 kg)	1998-09-21	Stockholm, Sweden	Coulee Region Chill (NAHL)	—
2	(United States)	Anthony Mollica	Freshman	D	6' 3" (1.91 m)	215 lb (98 kg)	2001-06-07	Hudsonville, Michigan	New Jersey Titans (NAHL)	—
3	(United States)	Luke Erickson	Junior	D	6' 2" (1.88 m)	210 lb (95 kg)	1999-04-15	Woodbury, Minnesota	Fairbanks Ice Dogs (NAHL)	—
4	(Canada)	Mason Waite	Sophomore	D	6' 1" (1.85 m)	200 lb (91 kg)	2000-04-04	Winnipeg, Manitoba	Prince George Spruce Kings (BCHL)	—
7	(United States)	Luc Salem	Junior	D	5' 10" (1.78 m)	180 lb (82 kg)	1999-07-09	Santa Monica, California	Topeka Pilots (NAHL)	—
8	(Canada)	Oak MacLeod	Sophomore	F	5' 10" (1.78 m)	180 lb (82 kg)	2002-04-04	Caledonia, Ontario	Jersey Hitmen (NCDC)	—
9	(Canada)	Philippe Chapleau	Sophomore	D	5' 9" (1.75 m)	180 lb (82 kg)	2000-07-06	Longueuil, Quebec	Penticton Vees (BCHL)	—
10	(Czech Republic)	Tomáš Mazura	Sophomore	F	6' 4" (1.93 m)	200 lb (91 kg)	2000-09-23	Sezemice, Czech Republic	Providence (HEA)	EDM, 162nd overall 2019
11	(United States)	Will Arquiett	Sophomore	F	5' 8" (1.73 m)	170 lb (77 kg)	2000-06-25	Brasher Falls, New York	Aberdeen Wings (NAHL)	—
12	(Canada)	Greg Lapointe	Sophomore (RS)	F	5' 9" (1.75 m)	175 lb (79 kg)	2001-01-01	Granby, Quebec	Coquitlam Express (BCHL)	—
13	(Finland)	Aleksi Peltonen (C)	Senior	F	5' 11" (1.8 m)	180 lb (82 kg)	1998-06-08	Helsinki, Finland	Omaha Lancers (USHL)	—
14	(Canada)	Justin Paul	Junior	F	5' 11" (1.8 m)	188 lb (85 kg)	2000-04-10	Thunder Bay, Ontario	Wellington Dukes (OJHL)	—
16	(Canada)	Drake Burgin	Sophomore	D	5' 11" (1.8 m)	180 lb (82 kg)	2000-10-22	Winnipeg, Manitoba	Cranbrook Bucks (BCHL)	—
17	(United States)	Reilly Moran	Junior	F	5' 11" (1.8 m)	176 lb (80 kg)	2000-04-24	Hingham, Massachusetts	Powell River Kings (BCHL)	—
18	(Canada)	Tyler Cristall	Freshman	F	5' 9" (1.75 m)	170 lb (77 kg)	2002-05-13	Vancouver, British Columbia	West Kelowna Warriors (NAHL)	—
19	(United States)	Max Dorrington	Junior	F	6' 3" (1.91 m)	220 lb (100 kg)	2001-08-30	North Reading, Massachusetts	Cushing Academy (USHS–MA)	—
20	(United States)	Nicholas Trela	Junior	F	6' 2" (1.88 m)	185 lb (84 kg)	1999-08-26	Trenton, Michigan	Amarillo Bulls (NAHL)	—
21	(United States)	Cameron Buhl	Senior	F	5' 10" (1.78 m)	170 lb (77 kg)	1998-12-03	South St. Paul, Minnesota	Minnesota Magicians (NAHL)	—
22	(Canada)	Ty Naaykens	Sophomore	F	6' 1" (1.85 m)	185 lb (84 kg)	2001-01-27	Winnipeg, Manitoba	Fairbanks Ice Dogs (NAHL)	—
23	(United States)	Ashton Fry	Senior	F	5' 11" (1.8 m)	185 lb (84 kg)	1998-07-16	Highlands Ranch, Colorado	Kemptville 73's (CCHL)	—
24	(Canada)	Tucker McIntosh	Junior	D	6' 1" (1.85 m)	185 lb (84 kg)	2001-05-20	Toronto, Ontario	Ottawa Jr. Senators (CCHL)	—
25	(Latvia)	Fēlikss Gavars	Freshman	F	5' 11" (1.8 m)	184 lb (83 kg)	2002-05-15	Riga, Latvia	Fargo Force (USHL)	—
27	(United States)	Logan Ritchie	Junior	F	5' 11" (1.8 m)	180 lb (82 kg)	1999-07-27	O'Fallon, Missouri	Kenai River Brown Bears (NAHL)	—
28	(United States)	Josh Boyer	Senior	F	6' 3" (1.91 m)	200 lb (91 kg)	1999-10-07	Wasilla, Alaska	Omaha (NCHC)	—
29	(United States)	Jordan Steinmetz (C)	Senior	F	5' 8" (1.73 m)	170 lb (77 kg)	1999-01-10	Chippewa Falls, Wisconsin	Sioux City Musketeers (USHL)	—
31	(Canada)	Francis Boisvert	Senior	G	6' 2" (1.88 m)	185 lb (84 kg)	1999-03-11	Blainville, Quebec	Ottawa Jr. Senators (CCHL)	—
33	(United States)	Tim Makowski (C)	Senior	D	6' 1" (1.85 m)	195 lb (88 kg)	1998-11-14	St. Louis, Missouri	Aberdeen Wings (NAHL)	—
34	(Slovakia)	Ján Lašák	Freshman	F	6' 1" (1.85 m)	200 lb (91 kg)	2002-08-11	Šurany, Slovakia	Janesville Jets (NAHL)	—
35	(United States)	Grant Adams	Junior	G	6' 2" (1.88 m)	195 lb (88 kg)	2000-09-22	South Bend, Indiana	Salmon Arm Silverbacks (BCHL)	—

== Standings ==
2022–23 ECAC Hockey Standings
	Conference record										Overall record					
	GP	W	L	T	OTW	OTL	SW	PTS	GF	GA	GP	W	L	T	GF	GA
#1 Quinnipiac †	22	20	2	0	0	0	0	60	87	30	41	34	4	3	162	64
#10 Harvard	22	18	4	0	5	0	0	49	86	48	34	24	8	2	125	81
#9 Cornell	22	15	6	1	0	1	0	47	78	42	34	21	11	2	112	66
St. Lawrence	22	12	10	0	1	2	0	37	56	58	36	17	19	0	88	102
#18 Colgate *	22	11	8	3	4	1	3	36	71	58	40	19	16	5	113	109
Clarkson	22	9	10	3	0	1	0	31	60	60	37	16	17	4	102	98
Rensselaer	22	9	13	0	2	1	0	26	52	74	35	14	20	1	84	115
Union	22	8	13	1	0	0	1	26	45	68	35	14	19	2	86	117
Princeton	22	8	14	0	2	1	0	26	57	73	32	13	19	0	89	112
Yale	22	6	14	2	0	1	1	22	35	62	32	8	20	4	57	94
Brown	22	5	14	3	0	1	1	20	41	69	30	9	18	3	65	91
Dartmouth	22	4	17	1	0	2	1	16	44	70	30	5	24	1	64	106
Championship: March 18, 2023 † indicates conference regular season champion (Cleary Cup) * indicates conference tournament champion (Whitelaw Cup); Rankings: USCHO.com Top 20 Poll

== Schedule and results ==
Date	Time	Opponent^{#}	Rank^{#}	Site	TV	Decision	Result	Attendance	Record
Regular Season
October 2	7:00 PM	at #17 Massachusetts Lowell*		Tsongas Center • Lowell, Massachusetts	ESPN+	Zetterquist	L 0–4	5,580	0–1–0
October 7	7:00 PM	Merrimack*		Appleton Arena • Canton, New York	ESPN+	Zetterquist	W 3–1	1,426	1–1–0
October 8	7:00 PM	New Hampshire*		Appleton Arena • Canton, New York	ESPN+	Zetterquist	L 1–4	2,048	1–2–0
October 14	7:00 PM	Colorado College*		Appleton Arena • Canton, New York	ESPN+	Zetterquist	W 5–1	893	2–2–0
October 15	7:00 PM	Colorado College*		Appleton Arena • Canton, New York	ESPN+	Zetterquist	W 4–1	923	3–2–0
October 28	7:07 PM	at Michigan Tech*		MacInnes Student Ice Arena • Houghton, Michigan	FloHockey	Zetterquist	L 0–6	2,661	3–3–0
October 29	6:07 PM	at Michigan Tech*		MacInnes Student Ice Arena • Houghton, Michigan	FloHockey	Zetterquist	L 0–3	2,963	3–4–0
November 4	7:00 PM	Rensselaer		Appleton Arena • Canton, New York	ESPN+	Zetterquist	W 3–2	1,732	4–4–0 (1–0–0)
November 5	7:30 PM	Union		Appleton Arena • Canton, New York	ESPN+	Zetterquist	W 4–2	1,886	5–4–0 (2–0–0)
November 11	7:00 PM	Cornell		Appleton Arena • Canton, New York	ESPN+	Zetterquist	L 1–5	1,395	5–5–0 (2–1–0)
November 12	7:00 PM	Colgate		Appleton Arena • Canton, New York	ESPN+	Zetterquist	L 1–4	1,611	5–6–0 (2–2–0)
November 25	7:00 PM	at #8 Providence*		Schneider Arena • Providence, Rhode Island	ESPN+	Zetterquist	L 3–4	1,885	5–7–0
December 2	7:00 PM	at #2 Quinnipiac		M&T Bank Arena • Hamden, Connecticut	ESPN+	Zetterquist	L 1–2	3,410	5–8–0 (2–3–0)
December 3	7:00 PM	at Princeton		Hobey Baker Memorial Rink • Princeton, New Jersey	ESPN+	Zetterquist	W 5–4	1,773	6–8–0 (3–3–0)
December 9	7:00 PM	Yale		Appleton Arena • Canton, New York	ESPN+	Zetterquist	W 2–1	1,121	7–8–0 (4–3–0)
December 10	7:00 PM	Brown		Appleton Arena • Canton, New York	ESPN+	Zetterquist	W 4–0	1,100	8–8–0 (5–3–0)
December 30	8:07 PM	at Omaha*		Baxter Arena • Omaha, Nebraska		Zetterquist	W 2–1	7,347	9–8–0
December 31	8:07 PM	at Omaha*		Baxter Arena • Omaha, Nebraska		Zetterquist	L 2–5	5,817	9–9–0
January 5	7:00 PM	at Niagara*		Dwyer Arena • Lewiston, New York	FloHockey	Zetterquist	L 3–4	437	9–10–0
January 7	7:00 PM	Niagara*		Appleton Arena • Canton, New York	ESPN+	Zetterquist	W 4–3 ^{OT}	1,216	10–10–0
January 13	7:00 PM	at Dartmouth		Thompson Arena • Hanover, New Hampshire	ESPN+	Zetterquist	W 3–2 ^{OT}	1,437	11–10–0 (6–3–0)
January 14	7:00 PM	at #9 Harvard		Bright-Landry Hockey Center • Boston, Massachusetts	NESN+, ESPN+	Zetterquist	L 0–5	3,095	11–11–0 (6–4–0)
January 20	7:00 PM	at Union		Achilles Rink • Schenectady, New York	ESPN+	Zetterquist	L 2–3	1,564	11–12–0 (6–5–0)
January 21	4:00 PM	at Rensselaer		Houston Field House • Troy, New York	ESPN+	Zetterquist	L 3–4	1,989	11–13–0 (6–6–0)
January 27	7:00 PM	Clarkson		Appleton Arena • Canton, New York (Rivalry)	ESPN+	Zetterquist	W 4–2	2,524	12–13–0 (7–6–0)
January 28	7:00 PM	at Clarkson		Cheel Arena • Potsdam, New York (Rivalry)	ESPN+	Zetterquist	W 4–2	-	13–13–0 (8–6–0)
February 3	7:00 PM	at Brown		Meehan Auditorium • Providence, Rhode Island	ESPN+	Zetterquist	W 6–0	502	14–13–0 (9–6–0)
February 4	7:00 PM	at Yale		Ingalls Rink • New Haven, Connecticut	ESPN+	Zetterquist	L 0–4	1,451	14–14–0 (9–7–0)
February 10	7:00 PM	Princeton		Appleton Arena • Canton, New York	ESPN+	Zetterquist	W 6–2	1,054	15–14–0 (10–7–0)
February 11	7:00 PM	#2 Quinnipiac		Appleton Arena • Canton, New York	ESPN+	Zetterquist	L 0–5	1,283	15–15–0 (10–8–0)
February 17	7:00 PM	at Colgate		Class of 1965 Arena • Hamilton, New York	ESPN+	Zetterquist	L 2–3 ^{OT}	914	15–16–0 (10–9–0)
February 18	7:00 PM	at #11 Cornell		Lynah Rink • Ithaca, New York	ESPN+	Zetterquist	W 1–0	4,267	16–16–0 (11–9–0)
February 24	7:00 PM	#7 Harvard		Appleton Arena • Canton, New York	ESPN+	Zetterquist	L 2–6	1,352	16–17–0 (11–10–0)
February 25	7:00 PM	Dartmouth		Appleton Arena • Canton, New York	ESPN+	Zetterquist	W 2–0	1,484	17–17–0 (12–10–0)
ECAC Hockey Tournament
March 10	7:00 PM	Colgate*		Appleton Arena • Canton, New York (Quarterfinal Game 1)	ESPN+	Zetterquist	L 3–4 ^{OT}	2,848	17–18–0
March 11	7:00 PM	Colgate*		Appleton Arena • Canton, New York (Quarterfinal Game 2)	ESPN+	Zetterquist	L 2–3	2,318	17–19–0
*Non-conference game. ^{#}Rankings from USCHO.com Poll. All times are in Eastern Time. Source:

== Scoring statistics ==
Name	Position	Games	Goals	Assists	Points	PIM
Luc Salem	D	36	10	17	27	28
Cameron Buhl	F	35	9	9	18	18
Ty Naaykens	F	31	3	13	16	6
Mason Waite	D	35	3	13	16	14
Ján Lašák	RW	34	4	11	15	2
Max Dorrington	F	36	7	7	14	36
Philippe Chapleau	D	35	1	13	14	11
Tyler Cristall	F	32	2	11	13	8
Aleksi Peltonen	F	29	6	6	12	8
Greg Lapointe	F	30	6	6	12	13
Tomáš Mazura	C	28	3	9	12	8
Fēlikss Gavars	F	36	3	9	12	8
Jordan Steinmetz	F	35	4	6	10	70
Tim Makowski	D	32	2	7	9	60
Drake Burgin	D	32	4	4	8	16
Josh Boyer	C	36	5	2	7	24
Reilly Moran	F	27	4	3	7	8
Tucker McIntosh	D	24	3	3	6	14
Justin Paul	LW	16	4	1	5	6
Will Arquiett	F	13	2	2	4	2
Emil Zetterquist	G	36	0	2	2	0
Nick Trela	F	15	1	1	2	2
Luke Erickson	D	11	1	0	1	10
Anthony Mollica	D	12	0	1	1	2
Ashton Fry	F	20	1	0	1	40
Grant Adams	G	1	0	0	0	0
Francis Boisvert	G	1	0	0	0	0
Oak MacLeod	RW	3	0	0	0	0
Logan Ritchie	F	5	0	0	0	0
Total			88	156	244	410

== Goaltending statistics ==
Name	Games	Minutes	Wins	Losses	Ties	Goals against	Saves	Shut outs	SV %	GAA
Grant Adams	1	39:15	0	0	0	1	16	0	.941	1.53
Emil Zetterquist	36	2111:47	17	19	0	93	824	4	.899	2.64
Francis Boisvert	1	16:14	0	0	0	1	15	0	.938	3.70
Empty Net	-	27:11	-	-	-	7	-	-	-	-
Total	36	2190:25	17	19	0	102	855	4	.893	2.79

== Rankings ==
Poll	Week																											
Poll	Pre	1	2	3	4	5	6	7	8	9	10	11	12	13	14	15	16	17	18	19	20	21	22	23	24	25	26	27 (Final)
USCHO.com	NR	-	NR	NR	NR	NR	NR	NR	NR	NR	NR	NR	NR	-	NR	NR	NR	NR	NR	NR	NR	NR	NR	NR	NR	NR	-	NR
USA Today	NR	NR	NR	NR	NR	NR	NR	NR	NR	NR	NR	NR	NR	NR	NR	NR	NR	NR	NR	NR	NR	NR	NR	NR	NR	NR	NR	NR

Note: USCHO did not release a poll in weeks 1, 13, or 26.

== Awards and honors ==
Player	Award	Ref
Luc Salem	ECAC Hockey Second Team	
