= 2022–23 Princeton Tigers men's ice hockey season =

- Conference: T–7th ECAC Hockey
- Home ice: Hobey Baker Memorial Rink

Rankings
- USCHO: NR
- USA Today: NR

Record
- Overall: 13–19–0
- Conference: 8–14–0
- Home: 7–7–0
- Road: 6–12–0

Coaches and captains
- Head coach: Ron Fogarty
- Assistant coaches: Tommy Davis; Shane Talarico

The 2022–23 Princeton Tigers Men's ice hockey season was the 120th season of play for the program and the 61st in the ECAC Hockey conference. The Tigers represented the Princeton University, played their home games at the Hobey Baker Memorial Rink and were coached by Ron Fogarty, in his 8th season.

== Season ==
After possessing little to no offense over the previous four seasons, Princeton finally began to see some improvement in 2023. While the team still averaged less than 3 goals per game over the course of the season, the Tigers managed to score 19 more goals than they had in 2022. Ian Murphy led the team's offense, but the addition of Brendan Gorman to the lineup appeared to finally help his older brother Liam begin to live up to his position as the program's only NHL draft pick. The defense, meanwhile, did an excellent job by limiting the chances of their opponents; Princeton allowed less than 28 shots against per game. The story of the season, however, was in goal.

After a bit of a sluggish start, Ethan Pearson posted back-to-back shutouts to stake a claim on the starting role in net. Following a predictable pair of losses to Quinnipiac, he recorded his third zero of the year against a ranked RIT squad and took a stranglehold on the Tiger crease. Princeton saw its best stretch of hockey in years as the Tigers went 8–3 over a 9-week period. The team managed to get above .500 and were in position to potentially get a bye into the ECAC quarterfinals, something they hadn't done since 2009.

In early February, after a slight decline in their performance, Princeton's season was dealt a mortal blow. In a game against St. Lawrence, Pearson went down with an injury on the Larries' second goal and would miss the remainder of the season. Without a third goaltender on the roster, Benjamin Crewe was brought in to be the backup from the school's club team, though that was only for emergency purposes. Aidan Porter was put in goal for the remainder of the season and results were not good.

In the final six games, Princeton went 1–5 while allowing more than 4 goals against per game. They slid down the ECAC standings, not only losing out on the possibility of a bye but also having to travel for the first round series. The reeling Tigers headed up to Schenectady to take on Union. Though they again allowed 4 goals in the match, Murphy's 3-point night helped spark the team to a 6–4 victory. They advanced to face Harvard in the quarterfinals and were completely outmatched by the Crimson. The Tigers dropped a pair of 1–6 decisions to meekly bow out of the postseason.

== Departures ==
Player	Position	Nationality	Cause
Corey Andonovski	Forward	Canada	Graduation (signed with Pittsburgh Penguins)
Finn Evans	Forward	Canada	Graduate transfer to Vermont
Jérémie Forget	Goaltender	Canada	Graduation (retired)
Luke Keenan	Forward	Canada	Graduation (signed with Jacksonville Icemen)
Matthew Kellenberger	Defenseman	Canada	Graduate transfer to RIT
Christian O'Neill	Forward	United States	Graduate transfer to Boston College
Mark Paolini	Defenseman	Canada	Graduation (retired)
Matthew Thom	Defenseman	Canada	Graduation (retired)
Mike Ufberg	Defenseman	United States	Graduation (retired)

== Recruiting ==
Player	Position	Nationality	Age	Notes
Kevin Anderson	Forward	Canada	19	Regina, SK
Benjamin Crewe	Goaltender	United States	22	Arlington, VA; joined mid-season from club team
Jaxson Ezman	Forward	United States	19	Middleton, WI
Brendan Gorman	Forward	United States	19	Arlington, MA
David Jacobs	Forward	United States	21	Needham, MA
Nick Marciano	Defenseman	Canada	20	Greenwich, CT
Tyler Rubin	Defenseman	United States	19	Wayland, MA
Jayden Sison	Forward	United States	19	Paoli, PA
Brendan Wang	Defenseman	Canada	20	Burnaby, BC

== Roster ==
As of September 8, 2022.

No.	Nat.	Player	Class	Pos	Height	Weight	DoB	Hometown	Previous team	NHL rights
1	(United States)	Benjamin Crewe	Junior	G	6' 1" (1.85 m)	170 lb (77 kg)	2000-02-13	Arlington, Virginia	The Kiski School (USHS-Prep)	—
3	(United States)	Mike Kennedy	Junior	D	6' 1" (1.85 m)	190 lb (86 kg)	2000-07-17	Holyoke, Massachusetts	Nanaimo Clippers (BCHL)	—
4	(United States)	David Ma	Sophomore	D	5' 11" (1.8 m)	180 lb (82 kg)	2002-06-22	Yonkers, New York	Chicago Steel (USHL)	—
7	(United States)	Nick Carabin	Junior	D	5' 10" (1.78 m)	175 lb (79 kg)	2000-04-30	Mahwah, New Jersey	Coquitlam Express (BCHL)	—
8	(United States)	Tyler Rubin	Freshman	D	5' 10" (1.78 m)	175 lb (79 kg)	2003-01-10	Natick, Massachusetts	West Kelowna Warriors (BCHL)	—
9	(Canada)	MacKenzie Merriman	Junior	F	5' 11" (1.8 m)	190 lb (86 kg)	2000-04-14	White Rock, British Columbia	Nanaimo Clippers (BCHL)	—
10	(United States)	Alex Konovalov	Sophomore	F	5' 10" (1.78 m)	180 lb (82 kg)	2000-11-12	Basking Ridge, New Jersey	Lone Star Brahmas (NAHL)	—
11	(United States)	Jayden Sison	Freshman	F	5' 9" (1.75 m)	185 lb (84 kg)	2003-01-27	Paoli, Pennsylvania	Coquitlam Express (BCHL)	—
12	(United States)	Ian Murphy	Junior	F	5' 11" (1.8 m)	176 lb (80 kg)	1999-04-06	Scituate, Massachusetts	Tri-City Storm (USHL)	—
13	(United States)	Nick Seitz	Junior	F	6' 1" (1.85 m)	190 lb (86 kg)	2000-01-18	Manhattan, New York	New Jersey Titans (NAHL)	—
14	(United States)	Liam Gorman	Senior	F	6' 3" (1.91 m)	199 lb (90 kg)	2000-05-08	Arlington, Massachusetts	Saint Sebastian's School (USHS–MA)	CHI, 177th overall 2018
15	(Canada)	Spencer Kersten	Senior	F	5' 10" (1.78 m)	185 lb (84 kg)	2000-05-16	Waterloo, Ontario	Oakville Blades (OJHL)	—
16	(United States)	Brendan Gorman	Freshman	F	6' 0" (1.83 m)	175 lb (79 kg)	2003-02-17	Arlington, Massachusetts	Saint Sebastian's School (USHS–MA)	—
17	(United States)	Adam Robbins	Junior	F	5' 8" (1.73 m)	155 lb (70 kg)	2000-04-12	New York, New York	Chicago Steel (USHL)	—
18	(Canada)	Matt Hayami	Senior	F	5' 10" (1.78 m)	185 lb (84 kg)	2000-05-21	Oakville, Ontario	Markham Royals (OJHL)	—
19	(United States)	Jack Cronin	Sophomore	F	5' 11" (1.8 m)	185 lb (84 kg)	2001-03-31	South Hamilton, Massachusetts	Minnesota Magicians (NAHL)	—
20	(Canada)	Kevin Anderson	Freshman	F	5' 11" (1.8 m)	175 lb (79 kg)	2003-09-15	Regina, Saskatchewan	Notre Dame Hounds (SJHL)	—
21	(United States)	Pito Walton	Senior	D	6' 2" (1.88 m)	192 lb (87 kg)	2000-03-17	Peapack, New Jersey	Coquitlam Express (BCHL)	—
22	(Canada)	Noah de la Durantaye	Sophomore	D	6' 1" (1.85 m)	205 lb (93 kg)	2000-05-27	Montreal, Quebec	Coquitlam Express (BCHL)	—
23	(United States)	Joe Berg	Junior	F	5' 11" (1.8 m)	185 lb (84 kg)	1999-10-07	Plano, Texas	Tri-City Storm (USHL)	—
24	(United States)	David Jacobs	Freshman	F	5' 10" (1.78 m)	180 lb (82 kg)	2001-09-26	Needham, Massachusetts	Cowichan Valley Capitals (BCHL)	—
25	(United States)	Nick Marciano	Freshman	D	6' 1" (1.85 m)	205 lb (93 kg)	2002-05-19	Greenwich, Connecticut	Prince George Spruce Kings (BCHL)	—
27	(United States)	Jaxson Ezman	Freshman	F	6' 1" (1.85 m)	185 lb (84 kg)	2002-12-22	Middleton, Wisconsin	Dubuque Fighting Saints (USHL)	—
28	(Canada)	Brendan Wang	Freshman	D	5' 11" (1.8 m)	180 lb (82 kg)	2002-02-08	Burnaby, British Columbia	Fort McMurray Oil Barons (AJHL)	—
31	(Canada)	Ethan Pearson	Sophomore	G	6' 2" (1.88 m)	190 lb (86 kg)	2002-07-30	Fredericton, New Brunswick	Mount Saint Charles Academy (Midget AAA)	—
35	(United States)	Aidan Porter	Senior	G	6' 2" (1.88 m)	180 lb (82 kg)	1999-05-18	Weston, Massachusetts	Vernon Vipers (BCHL)	—

== Standings ==
2022–23 ECAC Hockey Standings
	Conference record										Overall record					
	GP	W	L	T	OTW	OTL	SW	PTS	GF	GA	GP	W	L	T	GF	GA
#1 Quinnipiac †	22	20	2	0	0	0	0	60	87	30	41	34	4	3	162	64
#10 Harvard	22	18	4	0	5	0	0	49	86	48	34	24	8	2	125	81
#9 Cornell	22	15	6	1	0	1	0	47	78	42	34	21	11	2	112	66
St. Lawrence	22	12	10	0	1	2	0	37	56	58	36	17	19	0	88	102
#18 Colgate *	22	11	8	3	4	1	3	36	71	58	40	19	16	5	113	109
Clarkson	22	9	10	3	0	1	0	31	60	60	37	16	17	4	102	98
Rensselaer	22	9	13	0	2	1	0	26	52	74	35	14	20	1	84	115
Union	22	8	13	1	0	0	1	26	45	68	35	14	19	2	86	117
Princeton	22	8	14	0	2	1	0	26	57	73	32	13	19	0	89	112
Yale	22	6	14	2	0	1	1	22	35	62	32	8	20	4	57	94
Brown	22	5	14	3	0	1	1	20	41	69	30	9	18	3	65	91
Dartmouth	22	4	17	1	0	2	1	16	44	70	30	5	24	1	64	106
Championship: March 18, 2023 † indicates conference regular season champion (Cleary Cup) * indicates conference tournament champion (Whitelaw Cup); Rankings: USCHO.com Top 20 Poll

== Schedule and results ==
Date	Time	Opponent^{#}	Rank^{#}	Site	TV	Decision	Result	Attendance	Record
Regular Season
October 29	7:00 PM	at #14 Harvard		Bright-Landry Hockey Center • Boston, Massachusetts	NESN, ESPN+	Porter	L 2–4	1,508	0–1–0 (0–1–0)
November 4	7:00 PM	Cornell		Hobey Baker Memorial Rink • Princeton, New Jersey	ESPN+	Pearson	L 1–3	2,171	0–2–0 (0–2–0)
November 5	7:00 PM	Colgate		Hobey Baker Memorial Rink • Princeton, New Jersey	ESPN+	Porter	L 3–4 ^{OT}	1,102	0–3–0 (0–3–0)
November 11	7:00 PM	at Yale		Ingalls Rink • New Haven, Connecticut	ESPN+	Pearson	W 3–0	2,100	1–3–0 (1–3–0)
November 12	7:00 PM	at Brown		Meehan Auditorium • Providence, Rhode Island	ESPN+	Pearson	W 1–0	877	2–3–0 (2–3–0)
November 18	7:00 PM	#5 Quinnipiac		Hobey Baker Memorial Rink • Princeton, New Jersey	ESPN+	Pearson	L 1–4	2,103	2–4–0 (2–4–0)
November 19	7:00 PM	at #5 Quinnipiac		M&T Bank Arena • Hamden, Connecticut	ESPN+	Pearson	L 1–4	2,633	2–5–0 (2–5–0)
November 25	7:00 PM	at #20 RIT*		Gene Polisseni Center • Henrietta, New York	FloHockey	Porter	L 3–5	1,626	2–6–0
November 26	5:00 PM	at #20 RIT*		Gene Polisseni Center • Henrietta, New York	FloHockey	Pearson	W 5–0	1,571	3–6–0
December 2	7:00 PM	Clarkson		Hobey Baker Memorial Rink • Princeton, New Jersey	ESPN+	Pearson	W 6–2	1,180	4–6–0 (3–5–0)
December 3	7:00 PM	St. Lawrence		Hobey Baker Memorial Rink • Princeton, New Jersey	ESPN+	Pearson	L 4–5	1,773	4–7–0 (3–6–0)
December 9	7:00 PM	Union		Hobey Baker Memorial Rink • Princeton, New Jersey	ESPN+	Pearson	W 2–0	1,090	5–7–0 (4–6–0)
December 10	7:00 PM	Rensselaer		Hobey Baker Memorial Rink • Princeton, New Jersey	ESPN+	Pearson	W 6–5	1,575	6–7–0 (5–6–0)
December 30	8:00 PM	at Colorado College*		Ed Robson Arena • Colorado Springs, Colorado	ATTRM	Pearson	L 2–7	3,425	6–8–0
December 31	6:00 PM	at Colorado College*		Ed Robson Arena • Colorado Springs, Colorado		Pearson	W 2–1	3,415	7–8–0
January 6	7:00 PM	#10 Harvard		Hobey Baker Memorial Rink • Princeton, New Jersey	ESPN+	Pearson	L 3–4 ^{OT}	2,300	7–9–0 (5–7–0)
January 7	7:00 PM	Dartmouth		Hobey Baker Memorial Rink • Princeton, New Jersey	ESPN+	Pearson	W 4–2	2,300	8–9–0 (6–7–0)
January 13	7:00 PM	Long Island*		Hobey Baker Memorial Rink • Princeton, New Jersey	ESPN+	Pearson	W 5–2	1,300	9–9–0
January 17	7:00 PM	#12 Providence*		Hobey Baker Memorial Rink • Princeton, New Jersey	ESPN+	Pearson	W 3–2 ^{OT}	1,553	10–9–0
January 20	7:00 PM	at Colgate		Class of 1965 Arena • Hamilton, New York	ESPN+	Pearson	L 0–5	1,102	10–10–0 (6–8–0)
January 21	7:00 PM	at #16 Cornell		Lynah Rink • Ithaca, New York	ESPN+	Pearson	L 2–3	4,267	10–11–0 (6–9–0)
January 28	7:00 PM	Long Island*		Hobey Baker Memorial Rink • Princeton, New Jersey	ESPN+	Pearson	L 4–6	1,817	10–12–0
February 3	7:00 PM	at Dartmouth		Thompson Arena • Hanover, New Hampshire	ESPN+	Pearson	W 7–3	2,891	11–12–0 (7–9–0)
February 10	7:00 PM	at St. Lawrence		Appleton Arena • Canton, New York	ESPN+	Porter	L 2–6	1,054	11–13–0 (7–10–0)
February 11	7:00 PM	at Clarkson		Cheel Arena • Potsdam, New York	ESPN+	Porter	L 1–4	2,648	11–14–0 (7–11–0)
February 17	7:00 PM	Brown		Hobey Baker Memorial Rink • Princeton, New Jersey	ESPN+	Porter	W 2–3	1,599	12–14–0 (8–11–0)
February 18	7:00 PM	Yale		Hobey Baker Memorial Rink • Princeton, New Jersey	ESPN+	Porter	L 0–4	2,218	12–15–0 (8–12–0)
February 24	7:00 PM	at Rensselaer		Houston Field House • Troy, New York	ESPN+	Porter	L 4–6	2,155	12–16–0 (8–13–0)
February 25	7:00 PM	at Union		Achilles Rink • Schenectady, New York	ESPN+	Porter	L 1–3	2,155	12–17–0 (8–14–0)
ECAC Hockey Tournament
March 4	4:00 PM	at Union*		Achilles Rink • Schenectady, New York (First Round)	ESPN+	Porter	W 6–4	2,119	13–17–0
March 10	7:00 PM	at #6 Harvard*		Bright-Landry Hockey Center • Boston, Massachusetts (Quarterfinal Game 1)	ESPN+	Porter	L 1–6	1,671	13–18–0
March 11	7:00 PM	at #6 Harvard*		Bright-Landry Hockey Center • Boston, Massachusetts (Quarterfinal Game 2)	ESPN+	Porter	L 1–6	1,640	13–19–0
*Non-conference game. ^{#}Rankings from USCHO.com Poll. All times are in Eastern Time. Source:

== Scoring statistics ==
Name	Position	Games	Goals	Assists	Points	PIM
Ian Murphy	F	31	15	14	29	14
Liam Gorman	C	32	12	12	24	33
Pito Walton	D	32	7	14	21	12
Brendan Gorman	C	31	5	14	19	6
Jack Cronin	RW	32	12	6	18	24
Noah de la Durantaye	D	31	4	13	17	22
Nick Seitz	F	28	9	6	15	17
David Jacobs	RW	32	5	10	15	22
Adam Robbins	F	32	5	9	14	38
Nicholas Carabin	D	32	1	10	11	28
Spencer Kersten	RW	31	4	6	10	20
Jayden Sison	RW	30	2	6	8	10
Tyler Rubin	D	26	1	4	5	18
Mike Kennedy	D	28	1	4	5	14
Joe Berg	F	30	3	1	4	8
David Ma	D	17	0	4	4	16
Kevin Anderson	F	9	0	3	3	0
Nick Marciano	D	26	1	1	2	12
Jaxson Ezman	F	22	0	2	2	41
Matthew Hayami	C	26	2	0	2	0
Ethan Pearson	G	21	0	1	1	0
Alex Konovalov	F	7	0	1	1	4
Aidan Porter	G	13	0	0	0	0
Brendan Wang	D	18	0	0	0	12
Mackenzie Merriman	F	19	0	0	0	10
Total			89	141	230	381

== Goaltending statistics ==
Name	Games	Minutes	Wins	Losses	Ties	Goals against	Saves	Shut outs	SV %	GAA
Ethan Pearson	21	1174:07	11	9	0	53	494	4	.903	2.71
Aidan Porter	14	734:55	2	10	0	51	274	0	.843	4.16
Empty Net	-	23:00	-	-	-	8	-	-	-	-
Total	32	1932:02	13	19	0	112	768	4	.873	3.48

== Rankings ==
Poll	Week																											
Poll	Pre	1	2	3	4	5	6	7	8	9	10	11	12	13	14	15	16	17	18	19	20	21	22	23	24	25	26	27 (Final)
USCHO.com	NR	-	NR	NR	NR	NR	NR	NR	NR	NR	NR	NR	NR	-	NR	NR	NR	NR	NR	NR	NR	NR	NR	NR	NR	NR	-	NR
USA Today	NR	NR	NR	NR	NR	NR	NR	NR	NR	NR	NR	NR	NR	NR	NR	NR	NR	NR	NR	NR	NR	NR	NR	NR	NR	NR	NR	NR

Note: USCHO did not release a poll in weeks 1, 13, or 26.
