= 2022–23 Dartmouth Big Green men's ice hockey season =

- Conference: 12th ECAC Hockey
- Home ice: Thompson Arena

Rankings
- USCHO: NR
- USA Today: NR

Record
- Overall: 5–24–1
- Conference: 4–17–1
- Home: 3–10–1
- Road: 2–12–0
- Neutral: 0–2–0

Coaches and captains
- Head coach: Reid Cashman
- Assistant coaches: Jason Tapp; Troy Thibodeau
- Captain: Tanner Palocsik
- Alternate captain: Jack Cameron

The 2022–23 Dartmouth Big Green Men's ice hockey season was the 116th season of play for the program and the 61st in the ECAC Hockey conference. The Big Green represented Dartmouth College and were coached by Reid Cashman, in his second season as head coach.

== Season ==
After finishing the previous season at the bottom of the conference standings, Dartmouth was hoping to see some improvement in Reid Cashman's second year. Unfortunately, the team had to first contend with replacing its entire stable of goaltenders. Cooper Black eventually won the job and played well in his freshman season. The Big Green allowed roughly the same number of goals per game as they had the year before. While those numbers were nOt necessarily good, they were nOt poor either. The biggest problem for the team was, again, its lack of offense. Over the course of the season, Dartmouth averaged just over two goals per game, which was hardly sufficient for a squad that allowed an average of 3.52 goals against per game.

From the first game it was apparent that the Greens did not have the scoring punch to compete at the same level as most other teams and Dartmouth won just once in its first 13 games. The second half of the season was only marginally better than the first but the offense did not see any improvement. Dartmouth finished the season with just five wins, three coming against Yale, who possessed the worse offense in the ECAC. The Big Green finished dead last in the standing for a second year in a row and were knocked out of the postseason after just one game.

== Departures ==
Player	Position	Nationality	Cause
Tyler Borsch	Defenseman	United States	Left program (retired)
Justin Ferguson	Goaltender	United States	Graduation (retired)
Sam Hesler	Forward	United States	Graduation (retired)
Jeff Losurdo	Forward	United States	Graduation (retired)
Harrison Markell	Defenseman	United States	Graduation (signed with Worcester Railers)
Nate Morgan	Forward	Canada	Left program (retired)
Brock Paul	Defenseman	United States	Left program (retired)
Clay Stevenson	Goaltender	Canada	Signed professional contract (Washington Capitals)
Erik Urbank	Forward	United States	Graduate transfer to Canisius
Dylan Witzke	Defenseman	Canada	Left program (retired)

== Recruiting ==
Player	Position	Nationality	Age	Notes
Cooper Black	Goaltender	United States	21	Alpena, MI
Cooper Flinton	Forward	United States	19	Auburn, NH; selected 211th overall in 2021
John Fusco	Defenseman	United States	21	Westwood, MA; transfer from Harvard
Luke Haymes	Forward	Canada	19	Ottawa, ON
Alexander Krause	Forward	United States	21	Calabasas, CA
Cameron MacDonald	Forward	Canada	20	Surrey, BC
Tucker McRae	Defenseman	Canada	21	Calgary, AB
Mike Roberts	Goaltender	United States	19	Wilton, CT

== Roster ==
As of September 20, 2022.

No.	Nat.	Player	Class	Pos	Height	Weight	DoB	Hometown	Previous team	NHL rights
1	(United States)	Mikey Roberts	Freshman	G	6' 0" (1.83 m)	175 lb (79 kg)	2002-12-25	Wilton, Connecticut	Taft School (USHS–CT)	—
3	(United States)	John Fusco	Sophomore	D	5' 10" (1.78 m)	190 lb (86 kg)	2001-06-13	Westwood, Massachusetts	Harvard (ECAC)	TOR, 189th overall 2020
5	(Canada)	Tucker McRae	Freshman	D	6' 0" (1.83 m)	190 lb (86 kg)	2001-04-11	Calgary, Alberta	Okotoks Oilers (AJHL)	—
6	(United States)	Tanner Palocsik (C)	Senior	D	5' 11" (1.8 m)	190 lb (86 kg)	1999-05-26	Aliquippa, Pennsylvania	Jersey Hitmen (NCDC)	—
7	(Canada)	Jack Cameron (A)	Senior	D	6' 3" (1.91 m)	190 lb (86 kg)	1999-04-18	Halifax, Nova Scotia	Coquitlam Express (BCHL)	—
8	(United States)	Joey Musa	Junior	F	5' 9" (1.75 m)	160 lb (73 kg)	2000-06-11	Orange Park, Florida	Langley Rivermen (BCHL)	—
9	(United States)	Ryan Lovett	Junior	F	6' 2" (1.88 m)	200 lb (91 kg)	1999-07-06	Franklin, Massachusetts	Boston Junior Bruins (NCDC)	—
10	(United States)	Ryan Sorkin	Junior	F	5' 10" (1.78 m)	175 lb (79 kg)	2001-06-13	Chicago, Illinois	Lone Star Brahmas (NAHL)	—
11	(United States)	Mark Gallant	Senior	F	6' 0" (1.83 m)	185 lb (84 kg)	2000-05-01	Concord, Massachusetts	Islanders Hockey Club (NCDC)	—
12	(Canada)	Nick Unruh	Junior	F	6' 3" (1.91 m)	205 lb (93 kg)	2000-04-03	Fort McMurray, Alberta	Salmon Arm Silverbacks (BCHL)	—
14	(United States)	Steven Townley	Sophomore	F	6' 2" (1.88 m)	205 lb (93 kg)	2000-06-13	Woodstock, Vermont	Jersey Hitmen (NCDC)	—
15	(Canada)	Cam MacDonald	Freshman	F	5' 9" (1.75 m)	185 lb (84 kg)	2002-03-08	Surrey, British Columbia	Vernon Vipers (BCHL)	—
16	(Canada)	Tyler Campbell	Senior	F	5' 9" (1.75 m)	170 lb (77 kg)	1999-10-01	Winnipeg, Manitoba	Brooks Bandits (AJHL)	—
17	(United States)	Braiden Dorfman	Sophomore	F	6' 1" (1.85 m)	185 lb (84 kg)	2000-08-09	Nashville, Tennessee	Shreveport Mudbugs (NAHL)	—
18	(United States)	Josh Waters	Junior	F	5' 11" (1.8 m)	175 lb (79 kg)	2000-01-23	Collegeville, Pennsylvania	Maryland Black Bears (NAHL)	—
19	(Canada)	Sean Chisholm	Sophomore	F	6' 1" (1.85 m)	190 lb (86 kg)	2001-01-26	Caledonia, Ontario	Brooks Bandits (AJHL)	—
20	(United States)	Cooper Flinton	Freshman	F	6' 2" (1.88 m)	205 lb (93 kg)	2003-08-16	Auburn, New Hampshire	Cedar Rapids RoughRiders (USHL)	TBL, 211th overall 2021
21	(Canada)	Matt Hubbarde	Sophomore	F	6' 1" (1.85 m)	190 lb (86 kg)	2000-04-15	Pickering, Ontario	Langley Rivermen (BCHL)	—
22	(Norway)	Trym Løkkeberg	Sophomore	F	6' 2" (1.88 m)	210 lb (95 kg)	2001-07-23	Fredrikstad, Norway	Mora J20 (J20 Nationell)	—
23	(United States)	Ian Pierce	Sophomore	D	5' 10" (1.78 m)	190 lb (86 kg)	2001-01-24	Edgewater, New Jersey	Dubuque Fighting Saints (USHL)	—
27	(Canada)	Brady MacDonald	Sophomore	D	6' 4" (1.93 m)	190 lb (86 kg)	2000-01-24	Union, Ontario	Victoria Grizzlies (BCHL)	—
28	(Canada)	Luke Haymes	Freshman	F	6' 1" (1.85 m)	192 lb (87 kg)	2003-07-28	Ottawa, Ontario	Cowichan Valley Capitals (BCHL)	—
29	(United States)	Sean Keohan	Senior	D	5' 11" (1.8 m)	185 lb (84 kg)	1999-02-09	Milton, Massachusetts	Boston Junior Bruins (NCDC)	—
30	(United States)	Troy Burkhart	Senior	G	6' 1" (1.85 m)	170 lb (77 kg)	2001-03-20	Tampa, Florida	Henry B. Plant High School (USHS–FL)	—
31	(United States)	Cooper Black	Freshman	G	6' 8" (2.03 m)	222 lb (101 kg)	2001-06-14	Alpena, Michigan	Nanaimo Clippers (BCHL)	—
55	(United States)	Brock Paul	Senior	D	6' 3" (1.91 m)	205 lb (93 kg)	1999-11-10	Carmel, Indiana	Waterloo Black Hawks (USHL)	—
68	(Canada)	Nate Morgan	Sophomore	F	5' 10" (1.78 m)	190 lb (86 kg)	2002-02-08	Calgary, Alberta	Salmon Arm Silverbacks (BCHL)	—
95	(United States)	Alex Krause	Freshman	F	6' 1" (1.85 m)	190 lb (86 kg)	2001-07-22	Calabasas, California	Northeast Generals (NAHL)	—

== Standings ==
2022–23 ECAC Hockey Standings
	Conference record										Overall record					
	GP	W	L	T	OTW	OTL	SW	PTS	GF	GA	GP	W	L	T	GF	GA
#1 Quinnipiac †	22	20	2	0	0	0	0	60	87	30	41	34	4	3	162	64
#10 Harvard	22	18	4	0	5	0	0	49	86	48	34	24	8	2	125	81
#9 Cornell	22	15	6	1	0	1	0	47	78	42	34	21	11	2	112	66
St. Lawrence	22	12	10	0	1	2	0	37	56	58	36	17	19	0	88	102
#18 Colgate *	22	11	8	3	4	1	3	36	71	58	40	19	16	5	113	109
Clarkson	22	9	10	3	0	1	0	31	60	60	37	16	17	4	102	98
Rensselaer	22	9	13	0	2	1	0	26	52	74	35	14	20	1	84	115
Union	22	8	13	1	0	0	1	26	45	68	35	14	19	2	86	117
Princeton	22	8	14	0	2	1	0	26	57	73	32	13	19	0	89	112
Yale	22	6	14	2	0	1	1	22	35	62	32	8	20	4	57	94
Brown	22	5	14	3	0	1	1	20	41	69	30	9	18	3	65	91
Dartmouth	22	4	17	1	0	2	1	16	44	70	30	5	24	1	64	106
Championship: March 18, 2023 † indicates conference regular season champion (Cleary Cup) * indicates conference tournament champion (Whitelaw Cup); Rankings: USCHO.com Top 20 Poll

== Schedule and results ==
Date	Time	Opponent^{#}	Rank^{#}	Site	TV	Decision	Result	Attendance	Record
Exhibition
October 12	7:00 PM	McGill*		Thompson Arena • Hanover, New Hampshire (Exhibition)		Black	W 3–0	125	
October 21	7:00 PM	Guelph*		Thompson Arena • Hanover, New Hampshire (Exhibition)		Black	W 7–3	217	
Regular Season
October 28	7:00 PM	at #14 Harvard		Bright-Landry Hockey Center • Boston, Massachusetts	ESPN+	Black	L 2–5	2,276	0–1–0 (0–1–0)
October 30	2:00 PM	at Army*		Tate Rink • West Point, New York	FloHockey	Roberts	L 3–8	1,230	0–2–0
November 4	7:00 PM	Yale		Thompson Arena • Hanover, New Hampshire	ESPN+	Black	W 6–0	1,162	1–2–0 (1–1–0)
November 5	5:00 PM	Brown		Thompson Arena • Hanover, New Hampshire	ESPN+	Black	T 2–2 ^{SOW}	1,288	1–2–1 (1–1–1)
November 11	7:00 PM	at Union		Achilles Rink • Schenectady, New York	ESPN+	Black	L 1–4	1,676	1–3–1 (1–2–1)
November 12	7:00 PM	at Rensselaer		Houston Field House • Troy, New York	ESPN+	Black	L 1–2	1,810	1–4–1 (1–3–1)
Friendship Four
November 25	9:00 AM	vs. #4 Quinnipiac*		SSE Arena Belfast • Belfast, Northern Ireland (Friendship Four Semifinal)		Black	L 2–5	5,532	1–5–1
November 26	10:00 AM	vs. #14 Massachusetts Lowell*		SSE Arena Belfast • Belfast, Northern Ireland (Friendship Four Consolation Game)		Black	L 3–4	5,513	1–6–1
December 2	7:00 PM	at Colgate		Class of 1965 Arena • Hamilton, New York	ESPN+	Black	L 1–5	732	1–7–1 (1–4–1)
December 3	7:00 PM	at Cornell		Lynah Rink • Ithaca, New York	ESPN+	Black	L 0–1	4,267	1–8–1 (1–5–1)
December 9	7:00 PM	#14 Massachusetts Lowell*		Thompson Arena • Hanover, New Hampshire	ESPN+	Black	L 2–3	1,511	1–9–1
December 11	4:00 PM	at Vermont*		Gutterson Fieldhouse • Burlington, Vermont	ESPN+	Black	L 1–5	2,633	1–10–1
Ledyard Bank Classic
December 30	7:30 PM	#6 Merrimack*		Thompson Arena • Hanover, New Hampshire (Ledyard Bank Classic Semifinal)	ESPN+	Black	L 2–3 ^{OT}	2,169	1–11–1
December 31	4:00 PM	Yale*		Thompson Arena • Hanover, New Hampshire (Ledyard Bank Classic Consolation)	ESPN+	Black	W 4–3	1,584	2–11–1
January 6	7:00 PM	at #2 Quinnipiac		M&T Bank Arena • Hamden, Connecticut	ESPN+	Black	L 0–3	3,112	2–12–1 (1–6–1)
January 7	7:00 PM	at Princeton		Hobey Baker Memorial Rink • Princeton, New Jersey	ESPN+	Black	L 2–4	2,300	2–13–1 (1–7–1)
January 13	8:00 PM	St. Lawrence		Thompson Arena • Hanover, New Hampshire	ESPN+	Black	L 2–3 ^{OT}	1,437	2–14–1 (1–8–1)
January 14	5:00 PM	Clarkson		Thompson Arena • Hanover, New Hampshire	ESPN+	Black	L 4–5	1,821	2–15–1 (1–9–1)
January 20	7:00 PM	at Brown		Meehan Auditorium • Providence, Rhode Island	ESPN+	Black	W 4–3	677	3–15–1 (2–9–1)
January 21	7:00 PM	at Yale		Ingalls Rink • New Haven, Connecticut	ESPN+	Black	W 4–0	1,829	4–15–1 (3–9–1)
January 27	7:00 PM	#11 Cornell		Thompson Arena • Hanover, New Hampshire	ESPN+	Black	L 2–3	2,001	4–16–1 (3–10–1)
January 28	5:00 PM	Colgate		Thompson Arena • Hanover, New Hampshire	ESPN+	Black	L 3–4 ^{OT}	2,137	4–17–1 (3–11–1)
February 3	8:00 PM	Princeton		Thompson Arena • Hanover, New Hampshire	ESPN+	Black	L 3–7	2,891	4–18–1 (3–12–1)
February 4	8:00 PM	#2 Quinnipiac		Thompson Arena • Hanover, New Hampshire	ESPN+	Black	L 2–4	1,139	4–19–1 (3–13–1)
February 10	8:00 PM	#10 Harvard		Thompson Arena • Hanover, New Hampshire	ESPN+	Black	L 3–6	1,642	4–20–1 (3–14–1)
February 17	7:00 PM	Rensselaer		Thompson Arena • Hanover, New Hampshire	ESPN+	Black	L 1–3	1,267	4–21–1 (3–15–1)
February 18	5:00 PM	Union		Thompson Arena • Hanover, New Hampshire	ESPN+	Black	W 1–0	1,837	5–21–1 (4–15–1)
February 24	7:00 PM	at Clarkson		Cheel Arena • Potsdam, New York	ESPN+	Black	L 0–4	2,345	5–22–1 (4–16–1)
February 25	7:00 PM	at St. Lawrence		Appleton Arena • Canton, New York	ESPN+	Black	L 0–2	1,484	5–23–1 (4–17–1)
ECAC Hockey Tournament
March 3	7:00 PM	at Colgate*		Class of 1965 Arena • Hamilton, New York (First Round)	ESPN+	Black	L 3–5	926	5–24–1
*Non-conference game. ^{#}Rankings from USCHO.com Poll. All times are in Eastern Time. Source:

== Scoring statistics ==
Name	Position	Games	Goals	Assists	Points	PIM
Tanner Palocsik	D	30	4	18	22	22
Braiden Dorfman	F	30	7	10	17	25
Luke Haymes	C	30	11	5	16	34
Matt Hubbarde	C	30	5	11	16	12
Cooper Flinton	LW	27	6	9	15	12
Sean Chisholm	C/LW	30	7	7	14	22
Joey Musa	F	30	3	9	12	31
John Fusco	D	22	3	8	11	23
Tyler Campbell	C	28	4	5	9	4
Cam MacDonald	F	30	1	7	8	17
Ian Pierce	F	25	2	4	6	2
Jack Cameron	D	30	1	4	5	16
Tucker McRae	D	29	1	3	4	22
Steven Townley	F	30	0	4	4	4
Alex Krause	F	12	3	0	3	17
Ryan Sorkin	F	25	0	3	3	25
Mark Gallant	F	21	2	0	2	2
Trym Løkkeberg	C	23	2	0	2	4
Nick Unruh	F	11	0	2	2	0
Sean Keohan	D	27	0	2	2	6
Brady MacDonald	D	7	1	0	1	0
Nate Morgan	F	16	1	0	1	2
Cooper Black	G	30	0	1	1	0
Troy Burkhart	G	1	0	0	0	0
Mikey Roberts	G	2	0	0	0	0
Ryan Lovett	F	3	0	0	0	2
Josh Waters	F	7	0	0	0	4
Brock Paul	D	16	0	0	0	10
Total			64	112	176	318

== Goaltending statistics ==
Name	Games	Minutes	Wins	Losses	Ties	Goals against	Saves	Shut outs	SV %	GAA
Troy Burkhart	1	00:41	0	0	0	0	0	0	-	0.00
Cooper Black	30	1739:10	5	23	1	89	790	3	.899	3.07
Mikey Roberts	2	37:15	0	1	0	5	16	0	.762	8.05
Empty Net	-	42:00	-	-	-	8	-	-	-	-
Total	30	1819:06	5	24	1	106	806	3	.884	3.52

== Rankings ==
Poll	Week																											
Poll	Pre	1	2	3	4	5	6	7	8	9	10	11	12	13	14	15	16	17	18	19	20	21	22	23	24	25	26	27 (Final)
USCHO.com	NR	-	NR	NR	NR	NR	NR	NR	NR	NR	NR	NR	NR	-	NR	NR	NR	NR	NR	NR	NR	NR	NR	NR	NR	NR	-	NR
USA Today	NR	NR	NR	NR	NR	NR	NR	NR	NR	NR	NR	NR	NR	NR	NR	NR	NR	NR	NR	NR	NR	NR	NR	NR	NR	NR	NR	NR

Note: USCHO did not release a poll in weeks 1, 13, or 26.

== Awards and honors ==
Player	Award	Ref
Tanner Palocsik	ECAC Hockey Third Team	
Cooper Black	ECAC Hockey Rookie Team	
