= 2022–23 Brown Bears men's ice hockey season =

Ice hockey season

- Conference: 11th ECAC Hockey
- Home ice: Meehan Auditorium

Rankings
- USCHO: NR
- USA Today: NR

Record
- Overall: 9–18–3
- Conference: 5–13–2
- Home: 5–7–1
- Road: 4–11–2

Coaches and captains
- Head coach: Brendan Whittet
- Assistant coaches: Jason Smith; Matt Plante; Ed Kesell
- Captain: Luke Krys
- Alternate captain(s): Samuli Niinisaari; Jordan Tonelli

2022-2023 season

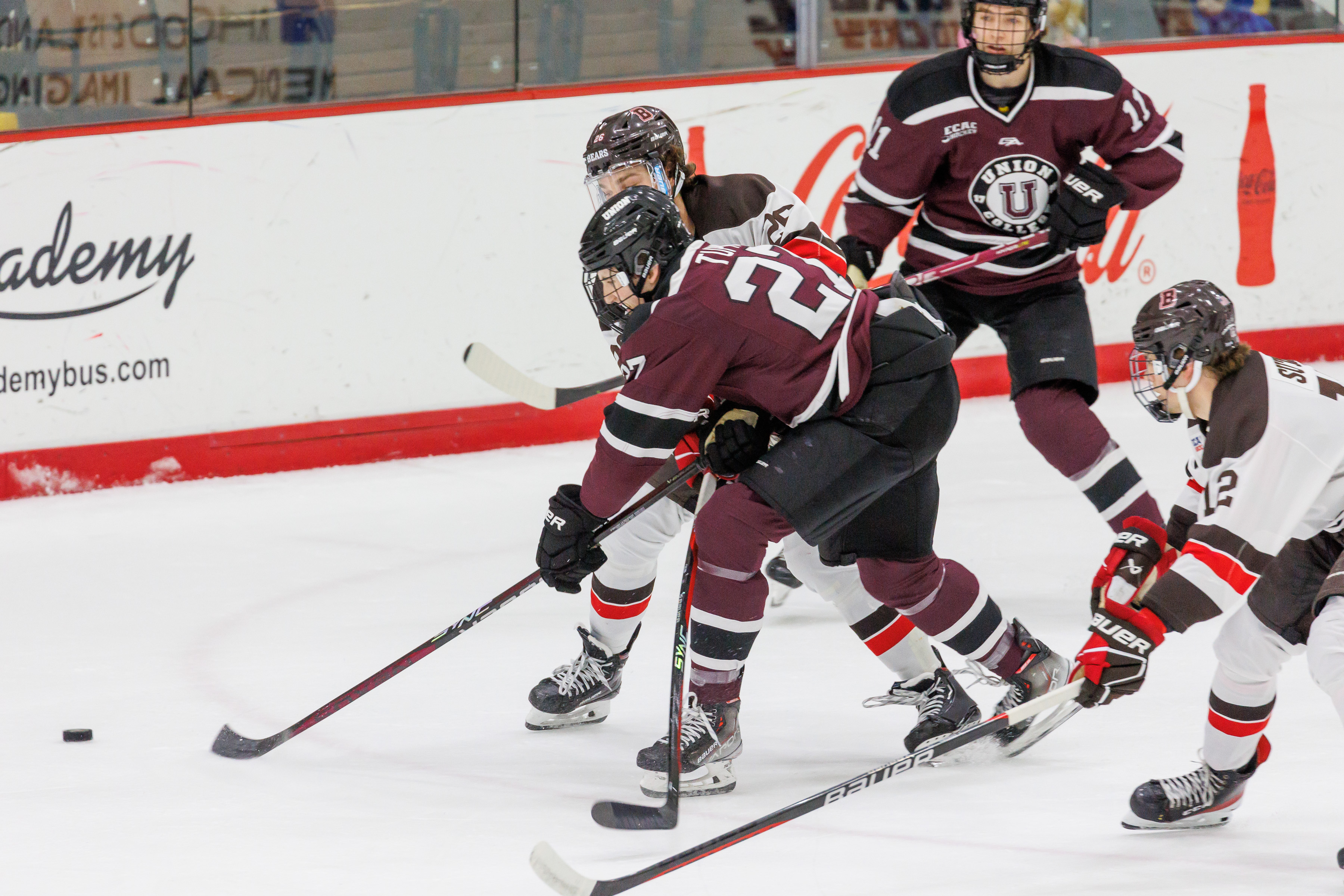
Jan 13: Bears defeat the Dutchmen, 6-2

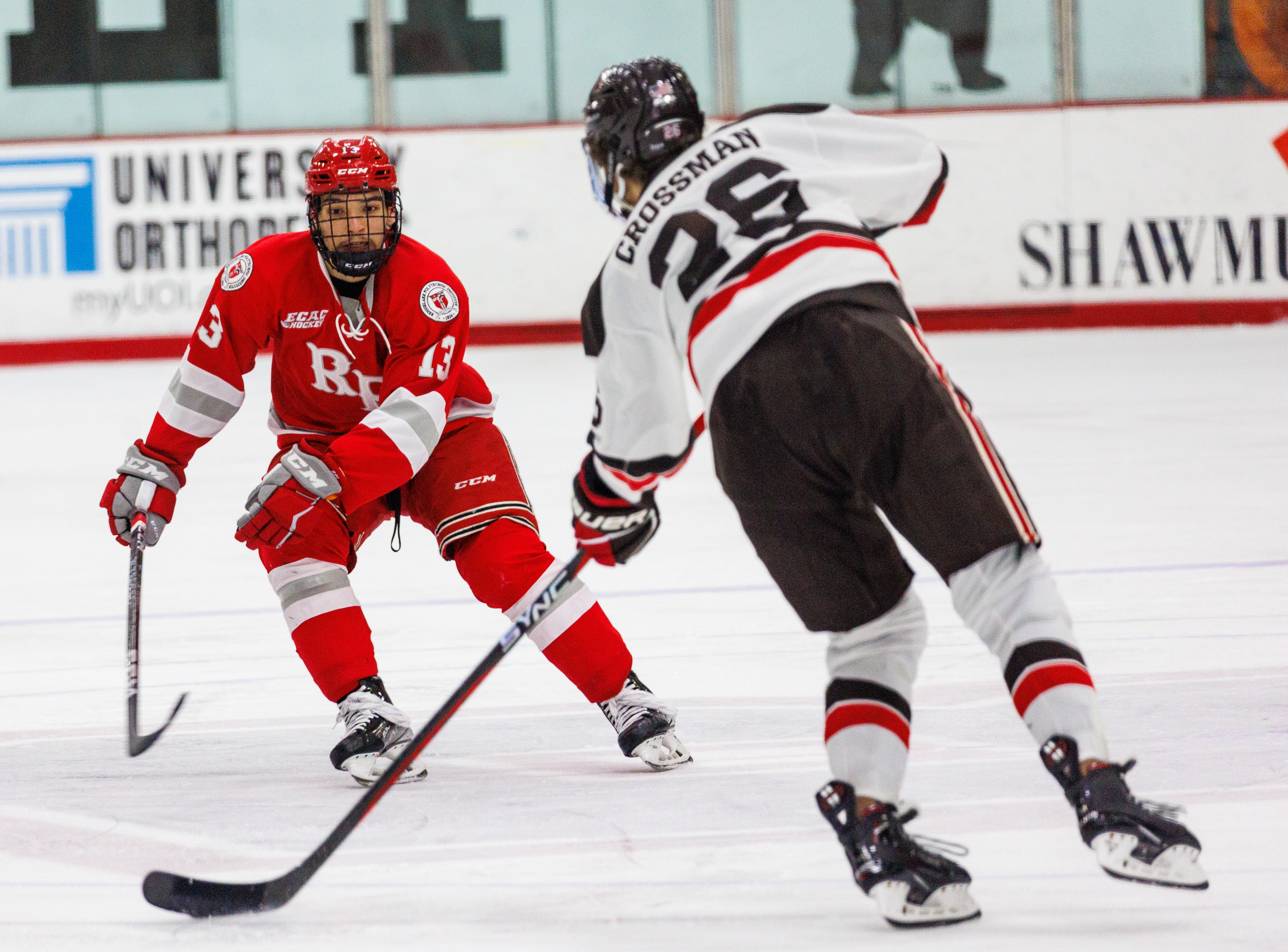
Jan 14: Bears defeat the Engineers, 3-0

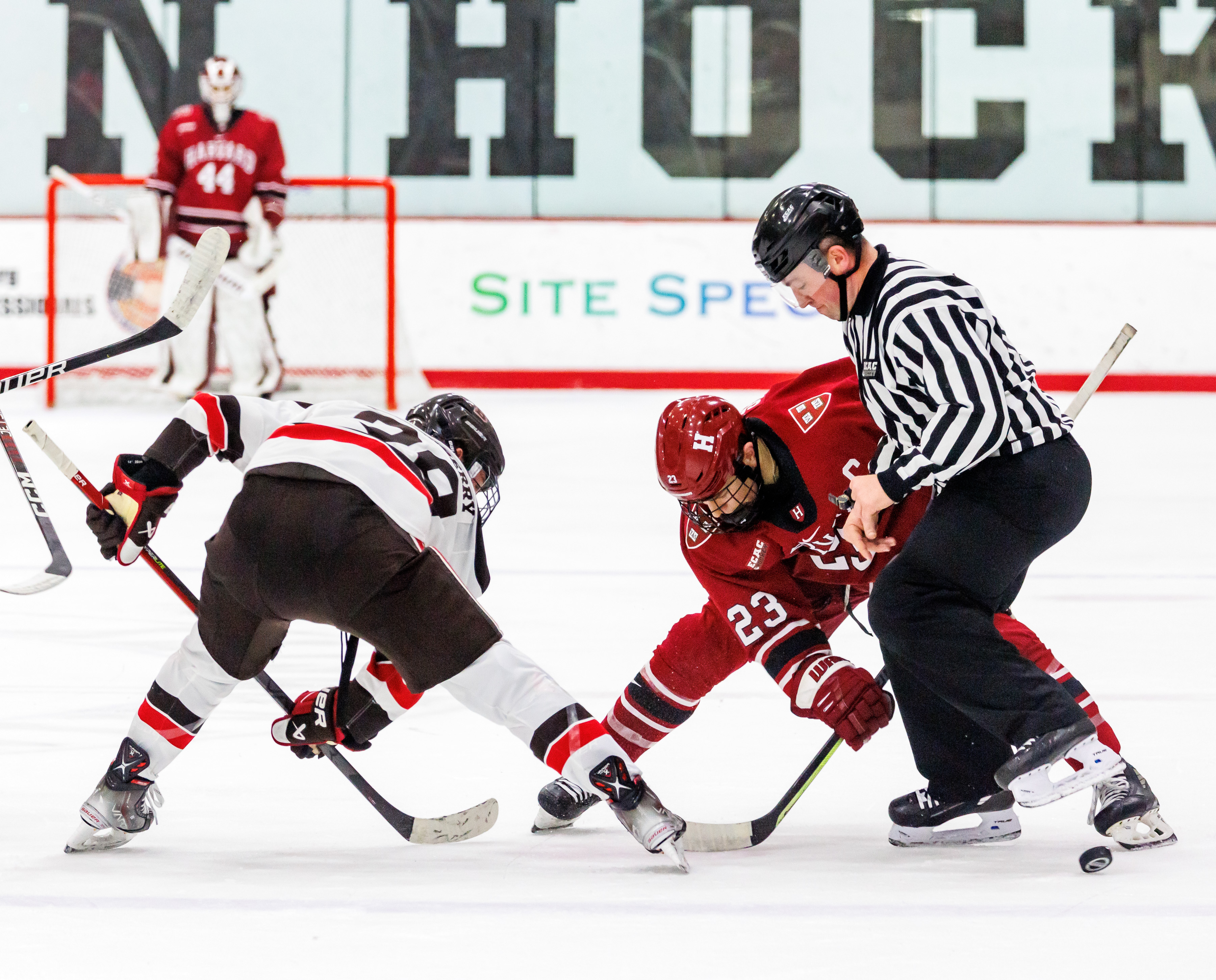
Jan 21: Bears defeat the Crimson, 3-2

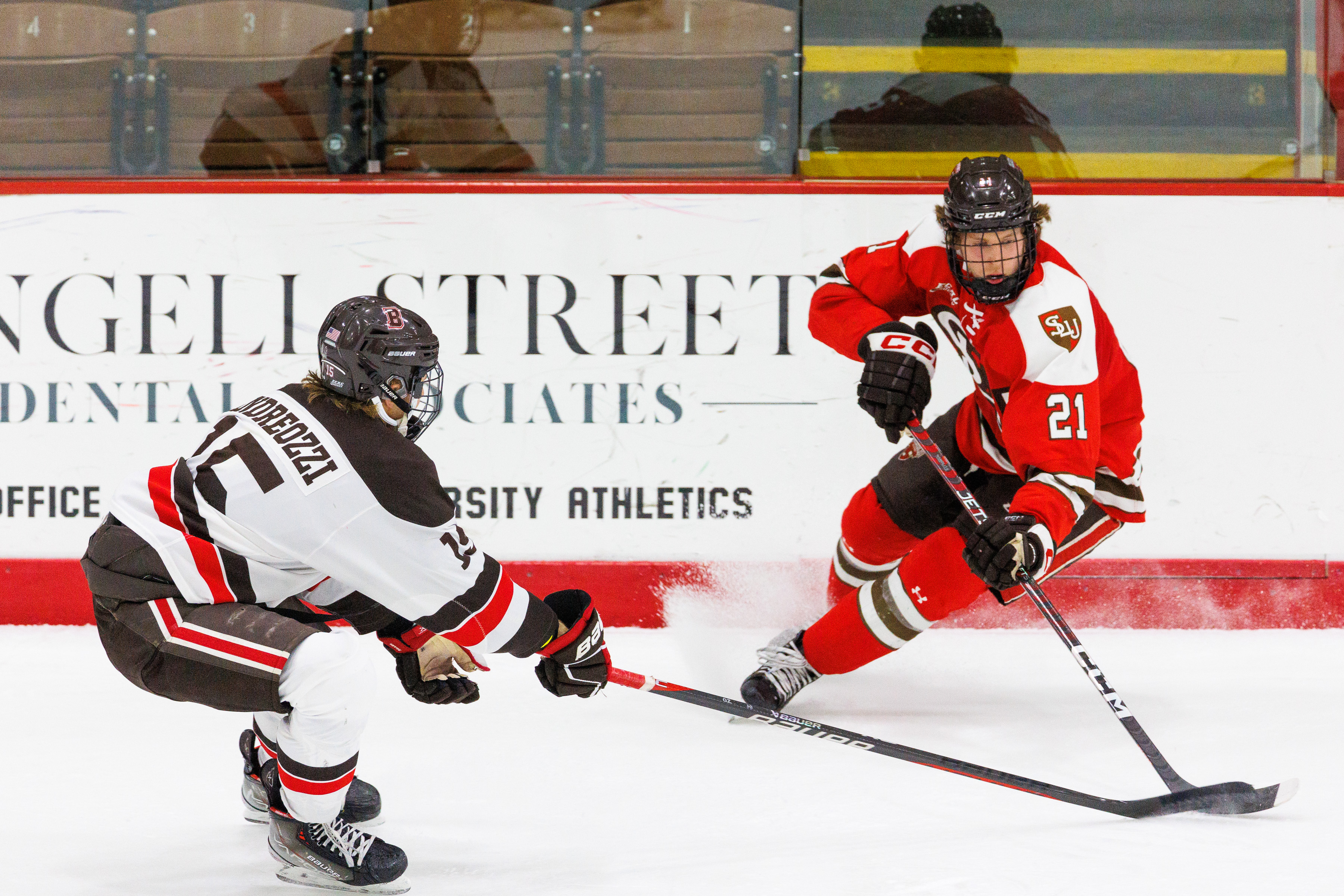
Feb 3: Bears are shutout by the Saints, 0-6

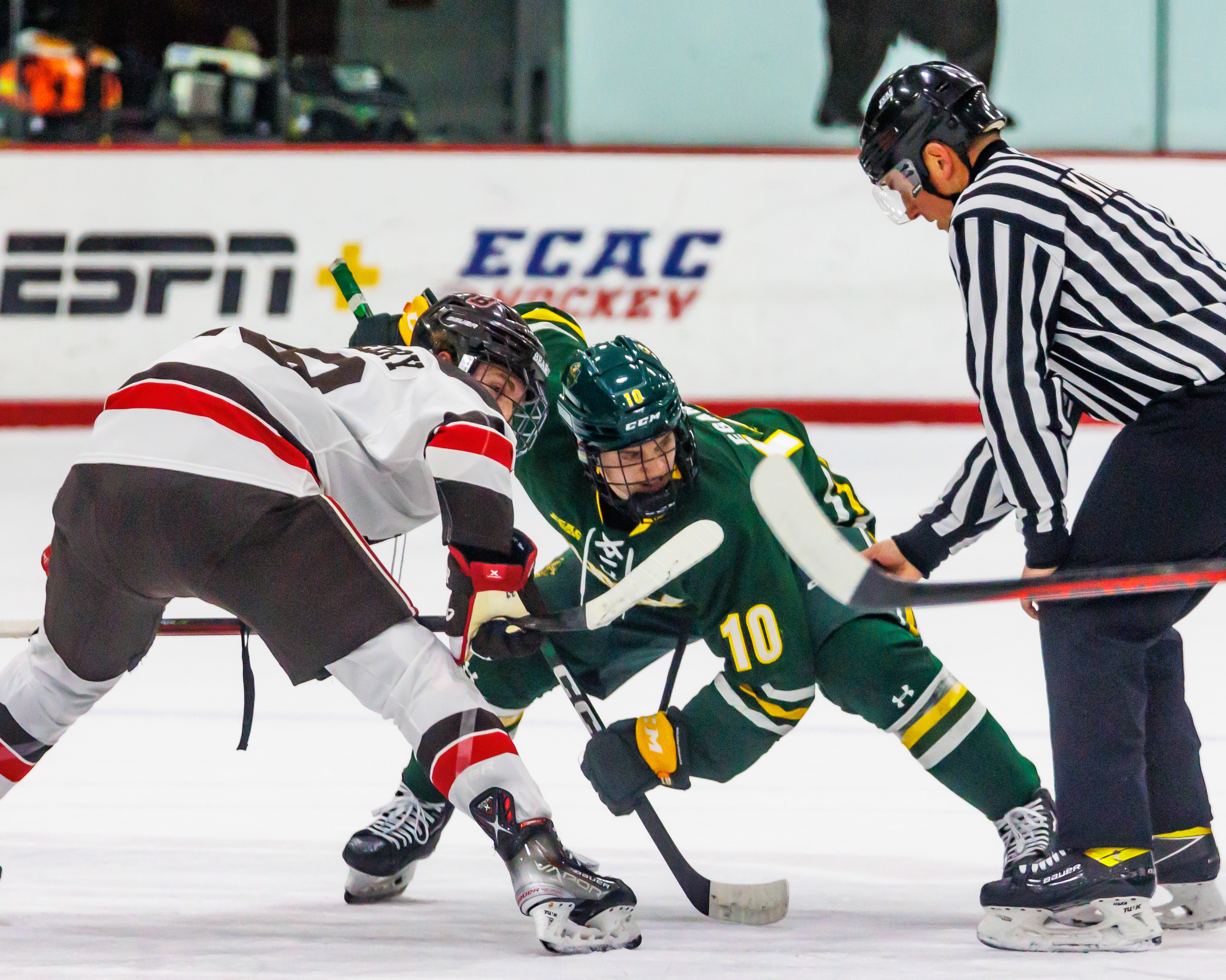
Feb 6: Bears lose to Golden Knights, 2-6

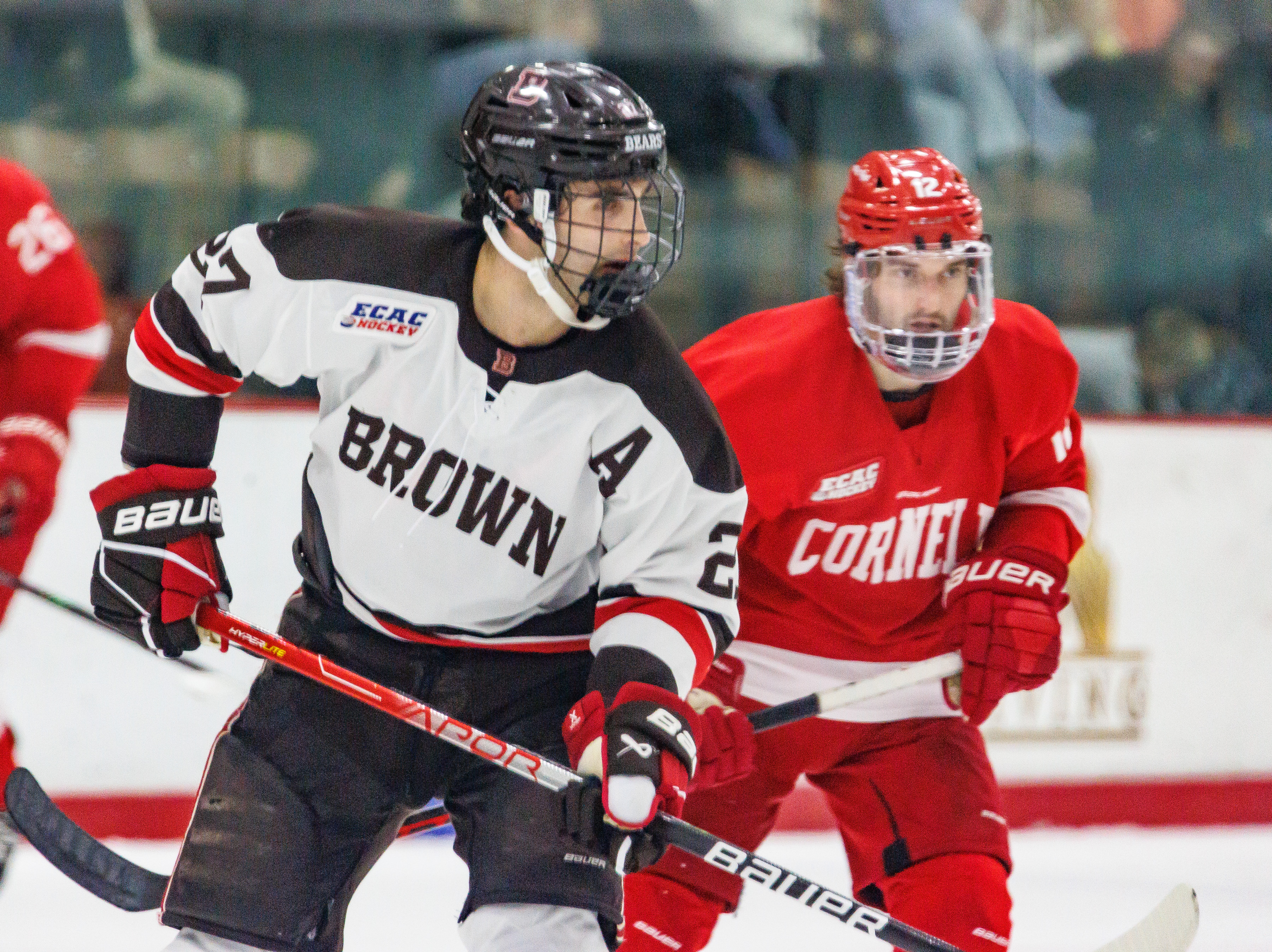
Feb 24: Bears are shut out by the Big Red, 0-5

The 2022–23 Brown Bears Men's ice hockey season was the 105th season of play for the program and the 61st in the ECAC Hockey conference. The Bears represented Brown University and were coached by Brendan Whittet, in his 13th season.

== Season ==
Brown had a slow start to the season, winning just once in their first eight games. While the offense was still trying to figure things out, the team had settled on Mathieu Caron as their starting goaltender. After Thanksgiving the team's results began to improve and Brown posted its first win over a ranked team in 4 years.

The Bears were hit and miss over the next few months but were able to win twice more against top-20 teams, including a very strong performance over Merrimack. After the team's win over Harvard, the Bears were just 3 games under .500 and had a chance to post just their second winning season in the last decade. Unfortunately, during the off week, Caron suffered an injury and missed six games. The team turned to freshman Jacob Zacharewicz, but he wasn't quite ready to be the starter. After allowing 6 goals in each of his first two games he settled into the role but the Bears ended up losing 5 of those contests.

When Caron returned at the end of the regular season, he didn't look like the same goaltender and couldn't stop Brown from finishing on a 1–6–1 run. The losses caused the Bears to drop to 11th in the conference and set them up against Clarkson in the first round. Caron looked much better after a full week of practice and weathered a barrage of shots, but Brown's offense gave him no support. The Bears could only manage 1 goal and were swiftly knocked out of the postseason.

== Departures ==
Player	Position	Nationality	Cause
Tristan Crozier	Forward	Canada	Graduate transfer to Merrimack
Dorian Dawson	Defenseman	Canada	Graduate transfer to Alaska Anchorage
Jake Harris	Forward	Canada	Graduation (retired)
Justin Jallen	Forward	United States	Graduate transfer to Michigan State
Luke Kania	Goaltender	United States	Graduation (retired)
Michael Maloney	Forward	United States	Graduation (retired)
Gabriel Vinal	Goaltender	United States	Graduate transfer to Clarkson

== Recruiting ==
Player	Position	Nationality	Age	Notes
Dean Bauchiero	Forward	United States	20	Southington, CT
Ryan Bottrill	Forward	United States	20	Scottsdale, AZ
Harry Meirowitz	Defenseman	United States	19	Old Westbury, NY
Gavin Puskar	Forward	United States	21	Westfield, NJ; transfer from Connecticut
Ryan Shostak	Forward	Canada	21	Calgary, AB
Zackary Tonelli	Forward	United States	20	Armonk, NY
Nick Traggio	Defenseman	United States	21	Sharon, CT
Jacob Zacharewicz	Goaltender	Canada	21	Riverhead, NY

== Roster ==
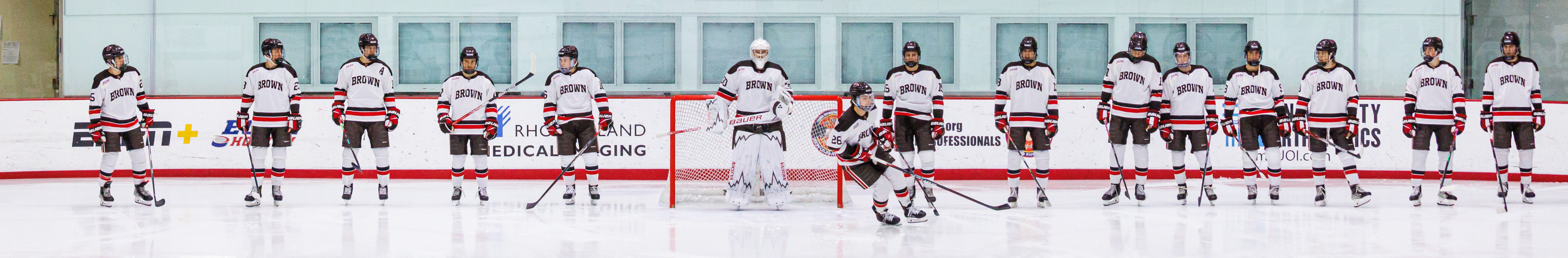
2022-23 players

As of July 18, 2022.

No.	Nat.	Player	Class	Pos	Height	Weight	DoB	Hometown	Previous team	NHL rights
1	(United States)	James Durham	Junior	G	6' 2" (1.88 m)	195 lb (88 kg)	1999-03-27	Grand Rapids, Michigan	Des Moines Buccaneers (USHL)	—
2	(United States)	Luke Krys (C)	Senior	D	6' 2" (1.88 m)	185 lb (84 kg)	2000-09-27	Ridgefield, Connecticut	Muskegon Lumberjacks (USHL)	—
3	(Canada)	Luke Albert	Senior	D	6' 2" (1.88 m)	201 lb (91 kg)	1998-08-17	Fergus, Ontario	Bonnyville Pontiacs (AJHL)	—
4	(United States)	Brett Bliss	Sophomore	D	6' 2" (1.88 m)	190 lb (86 kg)	2001-12-29	Chelmsford, Massachusetts	Surrey Eagles (BCHL)	—
5	(United States)	Nick Traggio	Freshman	D	6' 2" (1.88 m)	210 lb (95 kg)	2001-08-01	Sharon, Connecticut	Bonnyville Pontiacs (AJHL)	—
6	(United States)	Harry Meirowitz	Freshman	D	6' 0" (1.83 m)	185 lb (84 kg)	2003-05-21	Old Westbury, New York	P.A.L. Jr. Islanders (NCDC)	—
7	(United States)	Ryan Bottrill	Freshman	F	6' 1" (1.85 m)	185 lb (84 kg)	2002-02-04	Chandler, Arizona	Maryland Black Bears (NAHL)	—
8	(Canada)	Ryan Shostak	Freshman	F	6' 0" (1.83 m)	190 lb (86 kg)	2001-09-08	Calgary, Alberta	Vernon Vipers (BCHL)	—
9	(United States)	Connor Marshall	Senior	F	5' 11" (1.8 m)	185 lb (84 kg)	1998-10-10	Parkland, Florida	Northeast Generals (NAHL)	—
10	(United States)	Jonny Russell	Senior	F	5' 11" (1.8 m)	173 lb (78 kg)	1998-01-31	Traverse City, Michigan	Des Moines Buccaneers (USHL)	—
11	(Canada)	Nathan Plessis	Senior	F	6' 4" (1.93 m)	205 lb (93 kg)	1998-02-28	Salmon Arm, British Columbia	Brooks Bandits (AJHL)	—
12	(United States)	Matt Sutton	Junior	F	5' 11" (1.8 m)	185 lb (84 kg)	2001-05-26	Pittsburgh, Pennsylvania	Omaha Lancers (USHL)	—
13	(Canada)	Lynden Grandberg	Sophomore	F	6' 0" (1.83 m)	173 lb (78 kg)	2001-05-21	Calgary, Alberta	Camrose Kodiaks (AJHL)	—
14	(United States)	Spence Evans	Sophomore	D	6' 3" (1.91 m)	195 lb (88 kg)	2002-04-29	Oyster Bay Cove, New York	Johnstown Tomahawks (NAHL)	—
15	(United States)	Tony Andreozzi	Sophomore	D	5' 11" (1.8 m)	190 lb (86 kg)	2000-04-16	Winchester, Massachusetts	Salmon Arm Silverbacks (BCHL)	—
16	(United States)	Thomas Manty	Sophomore	F	5' 10" (1.78 m)	175 lb (79 kg)	2000-02-04	Andover, Massachusetts	Aberdeen Wings (NAHL)	—
17	(Canada)	Bradley Cocca	Senior	F	5' 8" (1.73 m)	170 lb (77 kg)	1999-08-13	Toronto, Ontario	Merritt Centennials (BCHL)	—
18	(United States)	Dean Bauchiero	Freshman	F	6' 4" (1.93 m)	215 lb (98 kg)	2002-03-04	Southington, Connecticut	Wichita Falls Warriors (NAHL)	—
19	(Finland)	Samuli Niinisaari (A)	Senior	D	6' 1" (1.85 m)	187 lb (85 kg)	1998-08-11	Hamina, Finland	Lincoln Stars (USHL)	—
20	(Canada)	Noah Wakeford	Sophomore	F	5' 8" (1.73 m)	175 lb (79 kg)	2000-06-29	Okotoks, Alberta	Trail Smoke Eaters (BCHL)	—
21	(United States)	Wyatt Schlaht	Sophomore	F	6' 2" (1.88 m)	200 lb (91 kg)	2000-06-04	Cherry Hills Village, Colorado	Surrey Eagles (BCHL)	—
23	(Canada)	Jackson Munro	Sophomore	D	5' 11" (1.8 m)	180 lb (82 kg)	2000-02-11	Vancouver, British Columbia	Chilliwack Chiefs (BCHL)	—
24	(United States)	Brenden Clark	Sophomore	F	6' 0" (1.83 m)	185 lb (84 kg)	2002-01-16	Morris Plains, New Jersey	Johnstown Tomahawks (NAHL)	—
25	(United States)	Zackary Tonelli	Freshman	F	5' 9" (1.75 m)	170 lb (77 kg)	2002-02-14	Greenwich, Connecticut	Vernon Vipers (BCHL)	—
26	(United States)	James Crossman	Senior	D	6' 3" (1.91 m)	200 lb (91 kg)	1998-11-23	Denver, Colorado	Jamestown Rebels (NAHL)	—
27	(United States)	Jordan Tonelli (A)	Junior	F	6' 0" (1.83 m)	180 lb (82 kg)	2000-06-30	Greenwich, Connecticut	Cedar Rapids RoughRiders (USHL)	—
28	(United States)	Gavin Puskar	Junior	F	6' 1" (1.85 m)	190 lb (86 kg)	2001-06-21	Fairfield, Connecticut	Connecticut (HEA)	—
29	(United States)	Cole Quisenberry	Senior	F	5' 11" (1.8 m)	180 lb (82 kg)	1999-03-22	Denver, Colorado	Chicago Steel (USHL)	—
30	(United States)	Jacob Zacharewicz	Freshman	G	6' 2" (1.88 m)	210 lb (95 kg)	2001-02-11	Riverhead, New York	El Paso Rhinos (NAHL)	—
31	(Canada)	Mathieu Caron	Sophomore	G	6' 0" (1.83 m)	190 lb (86 kg)	2000-03-29	Abbotsford, British Columbia	Chilliwack Chiefs (BCHL)	—

== Standings ==
2022–23 ECAC Hockey Standings
	Conference record										Overall record					
	GP	W	L	T	OTW	OTL	SW	PTS	GF	GA	GP	W	L	T	GF	GA
#1 Quinnipiac †	22	20	2	0	0	0	0	60	87	30	41	34	4	3	162	64
#10 Harvard	22	18	4	0	5	0	0	49	86	48	34	24	8	2	125	81
#9 Cornell	22	15	6	1	0	1	0	47	78	42	34	21	11	2	112	66
St. Lawrence	22	12	10	0	1	2	0	37	56	58	36	17	19	0	88	102
#18 Colgate *	22	11	8	3	4	1	3	36	71	58	40	19	16	5	113	109
Clarkson	22	9	10	3	0	1	0	31	60	60	37	16	17	4	102	98
Rensselaer	22	9	13	0	2	1	0	26	52	74	35	14	20	1	84	115
Union	22	8	13	1	0	0	1	26	45	68	35	14	19	2	86	117
Princeton	22	8	14	0	2	1	0	26	57	73	32	13	19	0	89	112
Yale	22	6	14	2	0	1	1	22	35	62	32	8	20	4	57	94
Brown	22	5	14	3	0	1	1	20	41	69	30	9	18	3	65	91
Dartmouth	22	4	17	1	0	2	1	16	44	70	30	5	24	1	64	106
Championship: March 18, 2023 † indicates conference regular season champion (Cleary Cup) * indicates conference tournament champion (Whitelaw Cup); Rankings: USCHO.com Top 20 Poll

== Schedule and results ==
Date	Time	Opponent^{#}	Rank^{#}	Site	TV	Decision	Result	Attendance	Record
Regular Season
October 29	7:00 PM	at Yale		Ingalls Rink • New Haven, Connecticut	ESPN+	Caron	L 0–2	1,300	0–1–0 (0–1–0)
October 30	4:00 PM	Yale		Meehan Auditorium • Providence, Rhode Island	ESPN+	Caron	W 2–1	839	1–1–0 (1–1–0)
November 4	7:00 PM	at #15 Harvard		Bright-Landry Hockey Center • Boston, Massachusetts	ESPN+	Caron	L 2–5	1,579	1–2–0 (1–2–0)
November 5	5:00 PM	at Dartmouth		Thompson Arena • Hanover, New Hampshire	ESPN+	Caron	T 2–2 ^{SOL}	1,288	1–2–1 (1–2–1)
November 11	7:00 PM	#5 Quinnipiac		Meehan Auditorium • Providence, Rhode Island	ESPN+	Caron	L 3–4	712	1–3–1 (1–3–1)
November 12	7:00 PM	Princeton		Meehan Auditorium • Providence, Rhode Island	ESPN+	Caron	L 0–1	877	1–4–1 (1–4–1)
November 18	7:00 PM	at Colgate		Class of 1965 Arena • Hamilton, New York	ESPN+	Caron	L 2–3	882	1–5–1 (1–5–1)
November 19	7:00 PM	at Cornell		Lynah Rink • Ithaca, New York	ESPN+	Caron	L 1–5	3,695	1–6–1 (1–6–1)
November 25	2:00 PM	Holy Cross*		Meehan Auditorium • Providence, Rhode Island	ESPN+	Caron	W 3–0	574	2–6–1
November 26	7:00 PM	at #8 Providence*		Schneider Arena • Providence, Rhode Island (Mayor's Cup)	ESPN+	Caron	W 3–2	1,885	3–6–1
November 29	7:00 PM	Boston College*		Meehan Auditorium • Providence, Rhode Island	ESPN+	Caron	L 2–4	786	3–7–1
December 3	8:00 PM	at Long Island*		Northwell Health Ice Center • East Meadow, New York	ESPN+	Caron	W 5–1	300	4–7–1
December 4	7:15 PM	at Long Island*		Northwell Health Ice Center • East Meadow, New York	ESPN+	Zacharewicz	L 4–5 ^{OT}	200	4–8–1
December 9	7:00 PM	at Clarkson		Cheel Arena • Potsdam, New York	ESPN+	Caron	T 2–2 ^{SOW}	2,382	4–8–2 (1–6–2)
December 10	7:00 PM	at St. Lawrence		Appleton Arena • Canton, New York	ESPN+	Caron	L 0–4	1,100	4–9–2 (1–7–2)
January 3	7:00 PM	at #15 Massachusetts*		Mullins Center • Amherst, Massachusetts	ESPN+	Caron	L 0–3	2,070	4–10–2
January 7	7:00 PM	at #8 Merrimack*		J. Thom Lawler Rink • North Andover, Massachusetts	ESPN+	Caron	W 6–2	2,134	5–10–2
January 13	7:00 PM	Union		Meehan Auditorium • Providence, Rhode Island	ESPN+	Caron	W 6–2	1,177	6–10–2 (2–7–2)
January 14	7:00 PM	Rensselaer		Meehan Auditorium • Providence, Rhode Island	ESPN+	Caron	W 3–0	798	7–10–2 (3–7–2)
January 20	7:00 PM	Dartmouth		Meehan Auditorium • Providence, Rhode Island	ESPN+	Caron	L 3–4	677	7–11–2 (3–8–2)
January 21	7:00 PM	#9 Harvard		Meehan Auditorium • Providence, Rhode Island	ESPN+	Caron	W 3–2	823	8–11–2 (4–8–2)
February 3	7:00 PM	St. Lawrence		Meehan Auditorium • Providence, Rhode Island	ESPN+	Zacharewicz	L 0–6	502	8–12–2 (4–9–2)
February 4	7:00 PM	Clarkson		Meehan Auditorium • Providence, Rhode Island	ESPN+	Zacharewicz	L 2–6	709	8–13–2 (4–10–2)
February 10	7:00 PM	at Rensselaer		Houston Field House • Troy, New York	ESPN+	Zacharewicz	W 3–2	2,325	9–13–2 (5–10–2)
February 11	4:00 PM	at Union		Achilles Rink • Schenectady, New York	ESPN+	Zacharewicz	L 1–3	2,011	9–14–2 (5–11–2)
February 17	7:00 PM	at Princeton		Hobey Baker Memorial Rink • Princeton, New Jersey	ESPN+	Zacharewicz	L 2–3	1,599	9–15–2 (5–12–2)
February 18	7:00 PM	at #1 Quinnipiac		M&T Bank Arena • Hamden, Connecticut	ESPN+	Zacharewicz	L 2–5	3,367	9–16–2 (5–13–2)
February 24	7:00 PM	#13 Cornell		Meehan Auditorium • Providence, Rhode Island	ESPN+	Caron	L 0–5	1,177	9–17–2 (5–14–2)
February 25	7:00 PM	Colgate		Meehan Auditorium • Providence, Rhode Island	ESPN+	Caron	T 2–2 ^{SOL}	712	9–17–3 (5–14–3)
ECAC Hockey Tournament
March 4	7:00 PM	at Clarkson*		Cheel Arena • Potsdam, New York (First Round)	ESPN+	Caron	L 1–5	2,527	9–18–3
*Non-conference game. ^{#}Rankings from USCHO.com Poll. All times are in Eastern Time. Source:

== Scoring statistics ==
Name	Position	Games	Goals	Assists	Points	PIM
Ryan Bottrill	F	30	6	15	21	12
Jordan Tonelli	C/LW	23	7	10	17	26
Luke Krys	D	30	2	14	16	49
Brett Bliss	D	30	6	7	13	39
James Crossman	D	29	9	3	12	33
Cole Quisenberry	F	29	5	6	12	8
Bradley Cocca	C	29	4	8	12	14
Matt Sutton	F	26	3	7	10	6
Gavin Puskar	F	30	5	4	9	14
Nathan Plessis	F	30	3	6	9	56
Jackson Munro	D	20	1	8	9	8
Samuli Niinisaari	D	30	0	8	8	8
Ryan Shostak	F	29	5	2	7	4
Lynden Grandberg	F	28	3	3	6	8
Tony Andreozzi	D	30	1	4	5	8
Jonny Russell	RW	17	2	2	4	10
Thomas Manty	F	10	2	2	4	2
Zackary Tonelli	F	24	0	4	4	4
Brendan Clark	F	18	1	2	3	8
Noah Wakeford	F	7	0	1	1	0
Wyatt Schlaht	F	16	0	1	1	2
Luke Albert	D	25	0	1	1	12
Jacob Zacharewicz	G	7	0	0	0	0
Nick Traggio	D	8	0	0	0	4
Connor Marshall	F	10	0	0	0	2
Mathieu Caron	G	24	0	0	0	15
Total			65	119	184	352

== Goaltending statistics ==
Name	Games	Minutes	Wins	Losses	Ties	Goals against	Saves	Shut outs	SV %	GAA
Mathieu Caron	24	1446:30	8	12	3	60	701	2	.921	2.49
Jacob Zacharewicz	7	357:55	1	6	0	25	165	0	.868	4.19
Empty Net	-	18:00	-	-	-	9	-	-	-	-
Total	30	1822:25	9	18	3	94	866	2	.902	3.09

== Rankings ==
Poll	Week																											
Poll	Pre	1	2	3	4	5	6	7	8	9	10	11	12	13	14	15	16	17	18	19	20	21	22	23	24	25	26	27 (Final)
USCHO.com	NR	-	NR	NR	NR	NR	NR	NR	NR	NR	NR	NR	NR	-	NR	NR	NR	NR	NR	NR	NR	NR	NR	NR	NR	NR	-	NR
USA Today	NR	NR	NR	NR	NR	NR	NR	NR	NR	NR	NR	NR	NR	NR	NR	NR	NR	NR	NR	NR	NR	NR	NR	NR	NR	NR	NR	NR

Note: USCHO did not release a poll in weeks 1, 13, or 26.

== Awards and honors ==
Player	Award	Ref
Mathieu Caron	ECAC Hockey Third Team	
