= Charles-Alexis Legault =

Canadian ice hockey player (born 2003)

- Born: September 5, 2003 (age 23) Laval, Quebec, Canada
- Height: 6 ft 4 in (193 cm)
- Weight: 220 lb (100 kg; 15 st 10 lb)
- Position: Defence
- Shoots: Right
- NHL team (P) Cur. team: Carolina Hurricanes; Chicago Wolves (AHL)
- NHL draft: 139th overall, 2023; Carolina Hurricanes
- Playing career: 2024–present

Charles-Alexis Legault (born September 5, 2003) is a Canadian professional ice hockey player who is a defenceman for the Chicago Wolves of the American Hockey League (AHL) as a prospect to the Carolina Hurricanes of the National Hockey League (NHL). He was drafted 139th overall by the Hurricanes in the 2023 NHL entry draft.

== Playing career ==
Legault started the 2025–26 season assigned to the Chicago Wolves. On October 14, Legault was recalled to the Hurricanes after Jaccob Slavin suffered a lower-body injury, with room being made for the recall with Pyotr Kochetkov being placed on injured reserve. He made his NHL debut on October 20 against the Vegas Golden Knights. He played another two games in the NHL before being sent down on October 26 to make room for Domenick Fensore. Legault recorded an average time-on-ice just below twelve minutes, two blocks, and two minor penalties over the three games. He was called back up to the Hurricanes three days later as a replacement for Shayne Gostisbehere. He scored his first NHL goal and point on November 8 against the Buffalo Sabres in a 6–3 win. A day later in a game against the Toronto Maple Leafs, Legault got into a fight with Bobby McMann and ended up down on the ice. While on the ice, Nick Robertson's skates went over his hand and tore multiple extensor tendons. The injury forced him to have surgery to repair the tendons, putting him out of play for three to four months and on the injured reserve.

== Career statistics ==
			Regular season					Playoffs
Season	Team	League	GP	G	A	Pts	PIM	GP	G	A	Pts	PIM
2019–20	Muskegon Lumberjacks	USHL	2	0	0	0	2	—	—	—	—	—
2020–21	Lincoln Stars	USHL	23	3	2	5	10	—	—	—	—	—
2021–22	West Kelowna Warriors	BCHL	36	6	12	18	66	11	2	9	11	18
2022–23	Quinnipiac University	ECAC	40	2	7	9	22	—	—	—	—	—
2023–24	Quinnipiac University	ECAC	39	9	15	24	53	—	—	—	—	—
2024–25	Chicago Wolves	AHL	63	3	11	14	58	2	0	0	0	2
2025–26	Chicago Wolves	AHL	24	3	5	8	48	16	1	3	4	30
2025–26	Carolina Hurricanes	NHL	12	1	1	2	15	—	—	—	—	—
NHL totals			12	1	1	2	15	—	—	—	—	—
