= List of Canisius Golden Griffins men's ice hockey seasons =

This is a season-by-season list of records compiled by Canisius in men's ice hockey.

Canisius University has made one appearance in the NCAA Tournament, losing its only game in 2013.

== Season-by-season results ==
Note: GP = Games played, W = Wins, L = Losses, T = Ties

NCAA D-I Champions	NCAA Frozen Four	Conference regular season champions	Conference Playoff Champions

Season	Conference	Regular season (Note: Code explanation; GP—Games Played, W—Wins, L—Losses, T—Tied games, OTW—Overtime Wins, OTL—Overtime Loses, 3/SW—Win in 3 on 3 overtime or shootout, Pts—Points*)														Conference Tournament Results	National Tournament Results
Season	Conference	Conference									Overall					Conference Tournament Results	National Tournament Results
Season	Conference	GP	W	L	T	OTW	OTL	3/SW	Pts*	Finish	GP	W	L	T	%	Conference Tournament Results	National Tournament Results
Division III
Brian Cavanaugh (1980–1982)
1980–81	ECAC 3	6	4	2	0	–	–	–	.667	–	27	13	12	2	.519		
1981–82	ECAC 3	4	2	2	0	–	–	–	.500	–	29	16	12	1	.569		
Carl Koeppel (1982–1983)
1982–83	NYCHA	16	3	12	1	–	–	–	7	–	26	9	16	1	.365		
Brian Cavanaugh (1983–2004)
1983–84	NYCHA	18	2	15	1	–	–	–	5	–	27	5	21	1	.204		
1984–85	NYCHA	18	7	10	1	–	–	–	15	–	29	14	13	2	.517		
1985–86	NYCHA	18	10	7	1	–	–	–	21	–	29	18	9	2	.655	Lost ECAC West Quarterfinal 3–6 (Elmira)	
1986–87	Independent	–	–	–	–	–	–	–	–	–	32	21	11	0	.656	Won ECAC West Quarterfinal 2–0 (RIT); Lost Semifinal 4–9 (Plattsburgh State)	
1987–88	ECAC West	17	10	7	0	–	–	–	.588	7th	27	15	12	0	.556	Lost Quarterfinal 3–6 (Plattsburgh State)	
1988–89	ECAC West	22	13	9	0	–	–	–	.591	6th	35	15	19	1	.443	Lost Quarterfinal 3–6 (Union)	
1989–90	ECAC West	27	11	14	2	–	–	–	.444	–	28	12	14	2	.464		
1990–91	ECAC West	24	8	16	0	–	–	–	.333	–	27	9	18	0	.333		
1991–92	ECAC West	27	11	14	2	–	–	–	.444	–	28	12	14	2	.464		
1992–93	ECAC West	24	17	6	1	–	–	–	.729	3rd	30	18	11	1	.617	Won Semifinal, 5–3 (Mercyhurst); Lost Championship 1–2 (Elmira)	
1993–94	ECAC West	10	7	3	0	–	–	–	14	2nd	26	17	8	1	.673	Lost Semifinal, 3–4 (RIT)	
1994–95	ECAC West	8	4	2	2	–	–	–	.625	3rd	26	16	6	4	.692	Lost Semifinal, 4–5 (RIT)	
1995–96	ECAC West	8	5	2	1	–	–	–	.688	T–1st	27	18	7	2	.704	Won Semifinal, 6–2 (Mercyhurst); Lost Championship 2–3 (RIT)	
1996–97	ECAC West	10	1	7	2	–	–	–	4	5th	26	13	11	2	.538	Lost Semifinal, 2–3 (RIT)	
1997–98	ECAC West	10	4	5	1	–	–	–	9	T–3rd	26	12	11	3	.519	Lost Semifinal, 1–4 (Niagara)	
Division I
1998–99	MAAC	28	12	11	5	–	–	–	29	4th	36	16	15	5	.529	Won Quarterfinal, 7–4 (American International); Won Semifinal 5–2 (Quinnipiac); Lost Championship 3–4 (Holy Cross)	
1999–00	MAAC	27	16	8	3	–	–	–	35	3rd	35	21	10	4	.657	Lost Quarterfinal, 3–4 (Iona)	
2000–01	MAAC	26	13	9	4	–	–	–	30	4th	33	17	12	4	.576	Won Quarterfinal, 4–1 (Connecticut); Lost Semifinal 3–4 (Mercyhurst)	
2001–02	MAAC	26	13	9	4	–	–	–	30	5th	35	14	17	4	.457	Lost Quarterfinal, 2–3 (Sacred Heart)	
2002–03	MAAC	26	12	13	2	–	–	–	24	7th	37	12	21	4	.378	Lost Quarterfinal, 2–3 (Quinnipiac)	
2003–04	Atlantic Hockey	24	9	11	4	–	–	–	22	6th	34	10	16	8	.412	Won Quarterfinal, 1–0 (Quinnipiac); Lost Semifinal 1–4 (Holy Cross)	
Clancy Seymour (2004–2005)
2004–05	Atlantic Hockey	24	14†	7†	3†	–	–	–	31†	T–2nd†	35	16†	15†	4†	.514†	Lost Quarterfinal, 2–4 (Bentley)	
Dave Smith (2005–2017)
2005–06	Atlantic Hockey	28	9	18	2	–	–	–	18	7th	35	10	23	2	.314	Lost Quarterfinal, 2–7 (Mercyhurst)	
2006–07	Atlantic Hockey	28	9	16	3	–	–	–	21	9th	35	9	23	3	.350	Lost Play-In, 1–2 (American International)	
2007–08	Atlantic Hockey	28	10	13	5	–	–	–	25	T–6th	37	11	20	6	.378	Lost Quarterfinal series, 0–2 (Mercyhurst)	
2008–09	Atlantic Hockey	28	12	12	4	–	–	–	28	5th	37	15	16	6	.486	Lost Quarterfinal series, 1–2 (Bentley)	
2009–10	Atlantic Hockey	28	13	11	4	–	–	–	30	5th	37	17	15	5	.527	Won Quarterfinal series, 2–0 (Mercyhurst); Lost Semifinal 0–4 (RIT)	
2010–11	Atlantic Hockey	27	10	12	5	–	–	–	25	8th	38	13	19	6	.421	Won First Round, 6–3 (Niagara); Lost Quarterfinal series 1–2 (Holy Cross)	
2011–12	Atlantic Hockey	27	10	14	3	–	–	–	23	9th	36	10	22	4	.333	Lost First Round series, 1–2 (Connecticut)	
2012–13	Atlantic Hockey	27	12	13	2	–	–	–	26	T–7th	43	19	19	5	.500	Won First Round series, 2–0 (Bentley); Won Quarterfinal series 2–0 (Air Force); Won Semifinal 5–3 (Niagara); Won Championship 7–2 (Mercyhurst)	Lost Regional semifinal 3–4 (Quinnipiac)
2013–14	Atlantic Hockey	27	11	13	3	–	–	–	25	T–7th	41	17	21	3	.451	Won First Round series, 2–0 (Sacred Heart); Lost Quarterfinal series, 1–2 (Bentley)	
2014–15	Atlantic Hockey	28	15	7	8	–	–	–	36	2nd	37	18	12	7	.581	Won Quarterfinal series, 2–0 (Sacred Heart); Lost Semifinal 1–2 (RIT)	
2015–16	Atlantic Hockey	28	10	13	5	–	–	–	25	T–6th	39	12	22	5	.372	Won First Round series, 2–1 (Niagara); Lost Quarterfinal series 0–2 (Air Force)	
2016–17	Atlantic Hockey	28	18	4	6	–	–	–	42	1st	39	21	11	7	.628	Won Quarterfinal series, 2–0 (Niagara); Lost Semifinal 6–2 (Robert Morris)	
Trevor Large (2017–Present)
2017–18	Atlantic Hockey	28	17	11	0	–	–	–	34	2nd	38	19	17	2	.526	Won Quarterfinal series, 2–1 (American International); Lost Semifinal, 0–3 (Air Force)	
2018–19	Atlantic Hockey	28	8	16	4	–	–	–	20	11th	37	12	20	5	.392	Lost First Round series, 1–2 (Niagara)	
2019–20	Atlantic Hockey	28	9	13	6	–	–	3	32	9th	36	10	20	6	.361	Lost First round series, 0–2 (Bentley)	
2020–21	Atlantic Hockey	13	8	5	0	1	1	0	.615	4th	17	11	6	0	.647	Won Quarterfinal series, 2–0 (RIT); Won Semifinal, 4–3 (OT) (Army); Lost Championship, 2–5 (American International)	
2021–22	Atlantic Hockey	26	13	11	2	2	1	1	43	2nd	35	16	16	3	.500	Lost Quarterfinal series, 0–2 (Mercyhurst)	
2022–23	Atlantic Hockey	26	13	10	3	3	1	1	41	4th	42	20	19	3	.512	Won Quarterfinal series, 2–1 (Army); Won Semifinal series, 2–1 (Niagara); Won Championship 3–0 (Holy Cross)	Lost Regional semifinal, 2–9 (Minnesota)
2023–24	Atlantic Hockey	26	10	12	4	2	1	0	33	8th	37	12	21	4	.378	Won First Round, 5–2 (Mercyhurst); Lost Quarterfinal series, 0–2 (Holy Cross)	
2024–25	AHA	26	11	13	2	0	3	0	38	6th	37	12	23	2	.351	Won First Round, 2–0 (Mercyhurst); Lost Quarterfinal series, 0–2 (Bentley)	
2025–26	AHA	26	12	12	2	1	0	2	39	7th	35	17	16	2	.514	Lost First Round, 2–5 (Mercyhurst)	
Totals											GP	W	L	T	%	Championships	
Regular season											1423	619	658	146	.486	1 ECAC West Championship, 1 Atlantic Hockey Championship	
Conference Post-season											93	41	52	0	.441	2 Atlantic Hockey tournament championships	
NCAA Post-season											2	0	2	0	.000	2 NCAA Tournament appearances	
Regular season and Post-season Record											1518	660	712	146	.483		

† Brian Cavanaugh was fired in December 2004.
