= List of RPI Engineers men's ice hockey seasons =

This is a season-by-season list of records compiled by Rensselaer in men's ice hockey.

Rensselaer Polytechnic Institute has won two National Titles in its history.

== Season-by-season results ==
Note: GP = Games played, W = Wins, L = Losses, T = Ties

NCAA D-I Champions	NCAA Frozen Four	Conference regular season champions	Conference Playoff Champions

Season	Conference	Regular season (Note: Code explanation; GP—Games Played, W—Wins, L—Losses, T—Tied games, OTW—Overtime Wins, OTL—Overtime Loses, 3/SW—Win in 3 on 3 overtime or shootout, Pts—Points*)														Conference Tournament Results	National Tournament Results
Season	Conference	Conference									Overall					Conference Tournament Results	National Tournament Results
Season	Conference	GP	W	L	T	OTW	OTL	3/SW	Pts*	Finish	GP	W	L	T	%	Conference Tournament Results	National Tournament Results
No Coach (1901–1917)
1901–02	Independent	–	–	–	–	–	–	–	–	–	1	0	1	0	.000		
1902–03	Independent	–	–	–	–	–	–	–	–	–	1	0	1	0	.000		
1903–04	Independent	–	–	–	–	–	–	–	–	–	1	1	0	0	1.000		
Program suspended
1906–07	Independent	–	–	–	–	–	–	–	–	–	3	2	1	0	.667		
1907–08	Independent	–	–	–	–	–	–	–	–	–	5	2	2	1	.500		
1908–09	Independent	–	–	–	–	–	–	–	–	–	5	2	3	0	.400		
1909–10	Independent	–	–	–	–	–	–	–	–	–	3	1	2	0	.333		
1910–11	Independent	–	–	–	–	–	–	–	–	–	4	0	4	0	.000		
1911–12	Independent	–	–	–	–	–	–	–	–	–	5	1	3	1	.300		
1912–13	Independent	–	–	–	–	–	–	–	–	–	4	0	4	0	.000		
1913–14	Independent	–	–	–	–	–	–	–	–	–	1	0	1	0	.000		
1914–15	Independent	–	–	–	–	–	–	–	–	–	3	0	3	0	.000		
1915–16	Independent	–	–	–	–	–	–	–	–	–	4	1	2	1	.375		
1916–17	Independent	–	–	–	–	–	–	–	–	–	6	2	4	0	.333		
Leroy Clark (1917–1923)
1917–18	Independent	–	–	–	–	–	–	–	–	–	3	0	2	1	.167		
1918–19	Independent	–	–	–	–	–	–	–	–	–	1	0	1	0	.000		
1919–20	Independent	–	–	–	–	–	–	–	–	–	4	1	3	0	.250		
1920–21	Independent	–	–	–	–	–	–	–	–	–	4	1	3	0	.250		
1921–22	Independent	–	–	–	–	–	–	–	–	–	4	0	4	0	.000		
1922–23	Independent	–	–	–	–	–	–	–	–	–	5	1	4	0	.200		
No Coach (1923–1924)
1923–24	Independent	–	–	–	–	–	–	–	–	–	5	2	3	0	.400		
W. J. Cook (1924–1925)
1924–25	Independent	–	–	–	–	–	–	–	–	–	4	2	2	0	.500		
Marvin Callan (1925–1938)
1925–26	Independent	–	–	–	–	–	–	–	–	–	6	2	4	0	.333		
1926–27	Independent	–	–	–	–	–	–	–	–	–	3	0	2	1	.167		
1927–28	Independent	–	–	–	–	–	–	–	–	–	4	2	1	1	.625		
1928–29	Independent	–	–	–	–	–	–	–	–	–	4	1	3	0	.250		
1929–30	Independent	–	–	–	–	–	–	–	–	–	3	1	2	0	.333		
1930–31	Independent	–	–	–	–	–	–	–	–	–	4	0	4	0	.000		
Program suspended
1936–37	Independent	–	–	–	–	–	–	–	–	–	1	0	1	0	.000		
1937–38	Independent	–	–	–	–	–	–	–	–	–	3	0	3	0	.000		
Program suspended
Ned Harkness (1949–1963)
1949–50	Independent	–	–	–	–	–	–	–	–	–	10	4	6	0	.400		
1950–51	Tri-State League	5	1	–	–	–	4	0	2	T–5th	15	5	10	0	.333		
1951–52	Tri-State League	5	4	1	0	–	–	–	14	T–1st	18	15	3	0	.833		
1952–53	Tri-State League	5	4	0	1	–	–	–	11	1st	20	15	4	1	.775		Lost Semifinal, 2–3 (Minnesota); Won Consolation Game, 6–3 (Boston University)
1953–54	Tri-State League	6	5	1	0	–	–	–	10	T–1st	23	18	5	0	.783		Won Semifinal, 6–4 (Michigan); Won Championship, 5–4 (OT) (Minnesota)
1954–55	Tri-State League	6	1	5	0	–	–	–	2	T–3rd	22	9	11	2	.455		
1955–56	Tri-State League	6	2	4	0	–	–	–	4	3rd	18	12	6	0	.667		
1956–57	Tri-State League	6	5	1	0	–	–	–	10	1st	21	14	6	1	.690		
1957–58	Tri-State League	5	2	3	0	–	–	–	6	2nd	21	14	6	1	.690		
1958–59	Tri-State League	5	2	3	0	–	–	–	6	T–2nd	21	13	8	0	.619		
1959–60	Tri-State League	4	2	2	0	–	–	–	4	2nd	22	15	7	0	.682		
1960–61	Tri-State League	4	2	2	0	–	–	–	4	2nd	22	16	5	1	.750		Lost Semifinal, 3–6 (St. Lawrence); Lost Consolation Game, 3–4 (Minnesota)
1961–62	ECAC Hockey	15	12	4	0	–	–	–	.750	T–6th	23	16	7	0	.696	Lost Quarterfinal, 3–6 (Colby)	
1961–62	Tri-State League†	4	1	3	0	–	–	–	2	3rd	23	16	7	0	.696	Lost Quarterfinal, 3–6 (Colby)	
1962–63	ECAC Hockey	14	6	7	1	–	–	–	.464	16th	23	10	12	1	.457		
1962–63	Tri-State League†	4	0	4	0	–	–	–	0	3rd	23	10	12	1	.457		
Rube Bjorkman (1963–1964)
1963–64	ECAC Hockey	18	12	6	0	–	–	–	.667	T–6th	26	18	8	0	.692	Won Quarterfinal, 3–2 (Boston College); Lost Semifinal, 3–1 (St. Lawrence); Won Consolation Game, 7–2 (Clarkson)	
1963–64	Tri-State League†	4	1	3	0	–	–	–	2	3rd	26	18	8	0	.692	Won Quarterfinal, 3–2 (Boston College); Lost Semifinal, 3–1 (St. Lawrence); Won Consolation Game, 7–2 (Clarkson)	
University Division
Garry Kearns (1964–1969)
1964–65	ECAC Hockey	15	5	8	2	–	–	–	.400	T–9th	22	10	10	2	.500		
1964–65	ICAC†	4	1	2	1	–	–	–	3	2nd	22	10	10	2	.500		
1965–66	ECAC Hockey	13	0	13	0	–	–	–	.000	15th	22	3	19	0	.136		
1965–66	ICAC†	4	0	4	0	–	–	–	0	3rd	22	3	19	0	.136		
1966–67	ECAC Hockey	15	1	14	0	–	–	–	.067	16th	24	8	15	1	.354		
1966–67	ICAC†	4	0	4	0	–	–	–	0	3rd	24	8	15	1	.354		
1967–68	ECAC Hockey	17	8	9	0	–	–	–	.471	11th	22	11	11	0	.500		
1967–68	ICAC†	4	0	4	0	–	–	–	0	3rd	22	11	11	0	.500		
1968–69	ECAC Hockey	14	8	5	1	–	–	–	.607	7th	21	12	8	1	.595	Lost Quarterfinal, 2–4 (Boston University)	
1968–69	ICAC†	4	2	1	1	–	–	–	5	1st	21	12	8	1	.595	Lost Quarterfinal, 2–4 (Boston University)	
Leon Abbott (1969–1972)
1969–70	ECAC Hockey	17	3	13	1	–	–	–	.206	15th	24	8	15	1	.354		
1969–70	ICAC†	4	1	3	0	–	–	–	2	T–2nd	24	8	15	1	.354		
1970–71	ECAC Hockey	14	7	5	2	–	–	–	.571	8th	25	16	7	2	.680	Lost Quarterfinal, 0–11 (Boston University)	
1970–71	ICAC†	4	0	3	1	–	–	–	1	3rd	25	16	7	2	.680	Lost Quarterfinal, 0–11 (Boston University)	
1971–72	ECAC Hockey	17	9	7	1	–	–	–	.559	7th	27	17	9	1	.648	Lost Quarterfinal, 2–8 (Boston University)	
1971–72	ICAC†	4	2	1	1	–	–	–	5	1st	27	17	9	1	.648	Lost Quarterfinal, 2–8 (Boston University)	
Jim Salfi (1972–1979)
1972–73	ECAC Hockey	20	11	9	0	–	–	–	.550	T–6th	31	16	15	0	.516	Lost Quarterfinal, 3–9 (Cornell)	
Division I
1973–74	ECAC Hockey	17	8	9	0	–	–	–	.471	8th	30	14	15	1	.483	Won Quarterfinal, 7–6 (OT) (New Hampshire); Lost Semifinal, 2–7 (Harvard); Lost Consolation Game, 2–8 (Cornell)	
1974–75	ECAC Hockey	19	8	10	1	–	–	–	.447	10th	28	14	13	1	.518		
1975–76	ECAC Hockey	23	9	12	2	–	–	–	.435	10th	28	13	13	2	.500		
1976–77	ECAC Hockey	24	14	10	0	–	–	–	.583	6th	30	17	12	1	.583	Lost Quarterfinal, 5–7 (Cornell)	
1977–78	ECAC Hockey	21	13	8	0	–	–	–	.619	4th	29	19	9	1	.672	Lost Quarterfinal, 6–7 (OT) (Boston College)	
1978–79	ECAC Hockey	25	8	16	1	–	–	–	.340	13th	28	10	17	1	.375		
Mike Addesa (1979–1989)
1979–80	ECAC Hockey	22	14	8	0	–	–	–	.636	6th	27	16	11	0	.593	Lost Quarterfinal, 0–8 (Dartmouth)	
1980–81	ECAC Hockey	21	10	11	0	–	–	–	.476	T–10th	29	16	13	0	.552		
1981–82	ECAC Hockey	20	6	12	2	–	–	–	.350	14th	29	9	18	2	.345		
1982–83	ECAC Hockey	20	13	7	0	–	–	–	.650	7th	29	18	11	0	.621	Lost Quarterfinal series, 0–2 (Harvard)	
1983–84	ECAC Hockey	20	17	3	0	–	–	–	.850	1st	38	32	6	0	.842	Won Quarterfinal series, 2–0 (Colgate); Won Semifinal, 5–1 (Clarkson); Won Championship, 5–2 (Boston University)	Lost Quarterfinal series, 6–9 (North Dakota)
1984–85	ECAC Hockey	21	20	1	0	–	–	–	40	1st	38	35	2	1	.934	Won Quarterfinal series, 2–0 (Princeton); Won Semifinal, 5–1 (Cornell); Won Championship, 3–1 (Harvard)	Won Quarterfinal series, 10–6 (Lake Superior State); Won Semifinal, 6–5 (3OT) (Minnesota–Duluth); Won Championship, 2–1 (Providence)
1985–86	ECAC Hockey	21	13	7	1	–	–	–	27	T–4th	32	20	11	1	.641	Lost Quarterfinal series, 0–2 (Clarkson)	
1986–87	ECAC Hockey	22	9	13	0	–	–	–	18	T–7th	33	13	18	2	.424	Won Quarterfinal series, 2–1 (Colgate); Lost Semifinal, 1–4 (Harvard); Tied Consolation Game, 4–4 (OT) (Yale)	
1987–88	ECAC Hockey	22	9	13	0	–	–	–	18	8th	32	15	17	0	.469	Lost Quarterfinal series, 0–2 (Harvard)	
1988–89	ECAC Hockey	22	8	12	2	–	–	–	18	8th	32	12	17	3	.422	Lost Quarterfinal series, 0–2 (Harvard)	
Buddy Powers (1989–1994)
1989–90	ECAC Hockey	22	14	8	0	–	–	–	28	2nd	34	20	14	0	.588	Won Quarterfinal series, 2–0 (Brown); Won Semifinal, 3–2 (Cornell); Lost Championship, 4–5 (Colgate)	
1990–91	ECAC Hockey	22	14	8	0	–	–	–	28	T–4th	32	19	12	1	.609	Lost Quarterfinal series, 0–1–1 (Harvard)	
1991–92	ECAC Hockey	22	6	12	4	–	–	–	16	10th	33	14	15	4	.485	Won Preliminary Round, 5–1 (Vermont); Won Quarterfinal, 4–3 (OT) (Harvard); Lost Semifinal, 5–6 (2OT) (St. Lawrence)	
1992–93	ECAC Hockey	22	15	6	1	–	–	–	31	2nd	35	20	11	4	.629	Won Quarterfinal series, 2–1 (Colgate); Lost Semifinal, 3–5 (Clarkson); Lost Consolation Game, 3–6 (Harvard)	
1993–94	ECAC Hockey	22	12	6	4	–	–	–	28	3rd	36	21	11	4	.639	Won Quarterfinal series, 2–1 (Union); Won Semifinal, 6–2 (Clarkson); Lost Championship, 0–3 (Harvard)	Lost Regional Quarterfinal, 0–2 (New Hampshire)
Dan Fridgen (1994–2006)
1994–95	ECAC Hockey	22	10	9	3	–	–	–	23	6th	37	19	14	4	.568	Won Quarterfinal series, 1–0–1 (Harvard); Won Semifinal, 2–1 (Colgate); Won Championship, 5–1 (Princeton)	Lost Regional Quarterfinal, 0–1 (Minnesota)
1995–96	ECAC Hockey	22	7	13	2	–	–	–	16	T–7th	35	10	22	3	.329	Won Preliminary Round, 5–4 (Dartmouth); Lost Quarterfinal series, 0–2 (Vermont)	
1996–97	ECAC Hockey	22	13	7	3	–	–	–	27	4th	36	20	12	4	.611	Won Quarterfinal series, 2–0 (Union); Lost Semifinal, 3–5 (Cornell); Won Consolation Game, 8–4 (Princeton)	
1997–98	ECAC Hockey	22	11	7	4	–	–	–	26	3rd	35	18	13	4	.571	Lost First round series, 1–2 (Cornell)	
1998–99	ECAC Hockey	22	13	7	2	–	–	–	28	3rd	37	23	12	2	.649	Won First round series, 2–1 (Harvard); Lost Semifinal, 3–6 (St. Lawrence); Won Consolation Game, 6–4 (Princeton)	
1999–00	ECAC Hockey	20	11	9	1	–	–	–	23	3rd	37	22	13	2	.622	Won First round series, 2–0 (Dartmouth); Won Semifinal, 3–1 (Colgate); Lost Championship, 0–2 (St. Lawrence)	
2000–01	ECAC Hockey	22	11	9	2	–	–	–	24	T–5th	34	17	15	2	.529	Lost First round series, 0–2 (Dartmouth)	
2001–02	ECAC Hockey	22	10	9	3	–	–	–	23	T–3rd	37	20	13	4	.595	Won First round series, 2–0 (Princeton); Won Four vs. Five, 2–1 (Dartmouth); Lost Semifinal, 0–3 (Cornell); Won Consolation Game, 4–3 (Clarkson)	
2002–03	ECAC Hockey	22	4	15	3	–	–	–	11	11th	40	12	25	3	.338	Won First round series, 2–0 (Union); Lost Quarterfinal series, 0–2 (Cornell)	
2003–04	ECAC Hockey	22	13	8	1	–	–	–	27	T–4th	39	22	15	2	.590	Won First round series, 2–0 (Princeton); Lost Quarterfinal series, 1–2 (Dartmouth)	
2004–05	ECAC Hockey	22	6	15	1	–	–	–	13	11th	38	14	22	2	.395	Lost First round series, 0–2 (Brown)	
2005–06	ECAC Hockey	22	8	8	6	–	–	–	22	T–6th	37	14	17	6	.472	Lost First round series, 0–2 (Quinnipiac)	
Seth Appert (2006–2017)
2006–07	ECAC Hockey	22	6	11	5	–	–	–	17	T–8th	36	10	18	8	.389	Lost First round series, 0–2 (Colgate)	
2007–08	ECAC Hockey	22	6	13	3	–	–	–	15	T–10th	38	11	23	4	.342	Lost First round series, 0–2 (Yale)	
2008–09	ECAC Hockey	22	6	15	1	–	–	–	13	11th	39	10	27	2	.282	Won First round series, 2–0 (Dartmouth); Lost Quarterfinal series, 1–2 (Cornell)	
2009–10	ECAC Hockey	22	10	9	3	–	–	–	23	T–5th	39	18	17	4	.513	Lost First round series, 1–2 (Brown)	
2010–11	ECAC Hockey	22	11	9	2	–	–	–	24	T–4th	38	20	13	5	.592	Lost First round series, 1–2 (Colgate)	Lost Regional semifinal, 0–6 (North Dakota)
2011–12	ECAC Hockey	22	7	12	3	–	–	–	17	10th	39	12	24	3	.346	Won First round series, 2–1 (Clarkson); Lost Quarterfinal series, 0–2 (Union)	
2012–13	ECAC Hockey	22	12	7	3	–	–	–	27	2nd	37	18	14	5	.554	Lost Quarterfinal series, 1–2 (Brown)	
2013–14	ECAC Hockey	22	8	9	5	–	–	–	21	7th	37	15	16	6	.486	Lost First round series, 1–2 (Dartmouth)	
2014–15	ECAC Hockey	22	8	12	2	–	–	–	18	9th	41	12	26	3	.329	Won First round series, 2–1 (Clarkson); Lost Quarterfinal series, 0–2 (St. Lawrence)	
2015–16	ECAC Hockey	22	8	7	7	–	–	–	23	T–5th	40	18	15	7	.538	Won First round series, 2–0 (Brown); Lost Quarterfinal series, 0–2 (Harvard)	
2016–17	ECAC Hockey	22	6	16	0	–	–	–	12	11th	37	8	28	1	.230	Lost First round series, 0–2 (Clarkson)	
Dave Smith (2017–2025)
2017–18	ECAC Hockey	22	4	16	2	–	–	–	10	11th	37	6	27	4	.216	Lost First round series, 1–2 (Colgate)	
2018–19	ECAC Hockey	22	7	13	2	–	–	–	16	11th	36	10	23	3	.319	Lost First round series, 0–2 (Yale)	
2019–20	ECAC Hockey	22	13	8	1	–	–	–	27	T-4th	34	17	15	2	.529	Tournament cancelled	
2020–21	ECAC Hockey	Season Cancelled															
2021–22	ECAC Hockey	22	10	12	0	0	0	0	30	6th	44	18	23	3	.443	Won First round series, 2–1 (Dartmouth); Lost Quarterfinal series, 1–2 (Harvard)	
2022–23	ECAC Hockey	22	9	13	0	2	1	0	26	T–7th	35	14	20	1	.414	Lost First round, 1–4 (Yale)	
2023–24	ECAC Hockey	22	6	13	3	0	0	0	21	12th	37	10	23	4	.324	Won First round, 3–2 (Clarkson); Lost Quarterfinal series, 0–2 (Quinnipiac)	
2024–25	ECAC Hockey	22	7	15	0	2	0	0	23	10th	35	12	21	2	.371	Lost First round, 2–5 (Harvard)	
Eric Lang (2025–Present)
Totals											GP	W	L	T	%	Championships	
Regular season											2215	1086	1028	151	.513	7 Tri-State League/ICAC Championships, 2 ECAC Championships	
Conference Post-season											150	65	82	3	.443	3 ECAC tournament championships	
NCAA Post-season											15	6	8	1	.433	8 NCAA Tournament appearances, 4 Frozen Four appearances	
Regular season and Post-season Record											2380	1137	1118	155	.504	2 National Championships	

* Winning percentage is used when conference schedules are unbalanced.
† Rensselaer played jointly in ECAC Hockey and the Tri-State League/ICAC from 1961 to 1972.
