= 2024–25 RPI Engineers men's ice hockey season =

- Conference: 10th ECAC Hockey
- Home ice: Houston Field House

Rankings
- USCHO: NR
- USA Hockey: NR

Record
- Overall: 12–21–2
- Conference: 7–15–0
- Home: 3–12–1
- Road: 9–8–1
- Neutral: 0–1–0

Coaches and captains
- Head coach: Dave Smith
- Assistant coaches: Mathias Lange; Chuck Weber; Kārlis Zirnis
- Captain: Jake Gagnon
- Alternate captain(s): Jack Brackett; Elliott McDermott; Max Smolinski

The 2024–25 RPI Engineers Men's ice hockey season was the 105th season of play for the program and the 63rd in ECAC Hockey. The Engineers represented Rensselaer Polytechnic Institute in the 2024–25 NCAA Division I men's ice hockey season, played their home games at Houston Field House and were coached by Dave Smith in his 7th season.

== Season ==
Over the course of the first half of the season, Rensselaer played up and down. Early on, the offense was fairly consistent, scoring more than 3 goals per game for the first two months of the season. Unfortunately, the Engineers' goaltending situation was particularly bad. The duo of Noah Giesbrecht and Jack Watson alternated starts through the first month with each allowing at least 3 goals in each of their games. However, in November, Giesbrecht was able to collect himself and put together a string of four solid performances, albeit against fairly weak opponents. The short stint of solid goaltending ended at the end of the month when they ran into a couple ranked teams and proceeded to lose four in a row. While they were able to finish off the first half of the season with a decent weekend, Rensselaer was no position to see their start as anything but a failure. All six of the team's victories came at the expense of some of the worst teams in college hockey (none would finish higher than 54th in the PairWise rankings) with just one win in six conference matches. Worse, the team's star prospect, Sutter Muzzatti was unable to overcome offseason surgery and ended up having to sit out the rest of the year after December 7.

The team was able to pick up the pace after the new year, posting 3 wins in five games, but after taking down a ranked Clarkson squad in mid-January, their season imploded. Giesbrecht was given the starting role for the entire second half of the season but it wasn't because he had distinguished himself. The Engineers routinely surrendered 4 goals or more in the final two months, losing 10 out of their final 13 games as a result. As if to rub salt in the wound, the offense provided a consistent level of scoring with the team getting contributions from up and down the lineup, but they could not overcome the poor goaltending they received on a nightly basis.

The team's lone playoff game was a microcosm of the season as the Engineers were able to put up two goals but Giesbrecht allowed 5 markers on 20 shots before being pulled. Unsurprisingly, the school was not satisfied with how the team had performed as of late and announced that Dave Smith would not be returning shortly after the end of the season.

== Departures ==
Player	Position	Nationality	Cause
Nick Ardanaz	Defenseman	Canada	Transferred to British Columbia
Finn Brown	Forward	Canada	Left program (retired)
Ryan Brushett	Forward	Canada	Graduation (signed with Trois-Rivières Lions)
Brendan Budy	Forward	Canada	Graduation (retired)
Carson Cherepak	Goaltender	Canada	Transferred to Lakehead
Danny Ciccarello	Forward	Canada	Transferred to Northern Michigan
Dylan Davies	Defenseman/Forward	United States	Graduation (retired)
John Evans	Forward	Canada	Transferred to Lindenwood
Austin Heidemann	Forward	United States	Graduation (signed with Worcester Railers)
Brett Miller	Goaltender	United States	Graduate transfer to Miami
Altti Nykänen	Forward	Finland	Graduation (retired)
C. J. Regula	Defenseman	United States	Graduation (signed with Worcester Railers)
Lauri Sertti	Defenseman	Finland	Graduate transfer to American International

== Recruiting ==
Player	Position	Nationality	Age	Notes
Arvils Bergmanis	Defenseman	Latvia	24	Riga, LAT; transfer from Alaska
Mathieu Bourgault	Forward	Canada	21	Saint-Bruno-de-Montarville, QC
Félix Caron	Forward	Canada	19	Terrebonne, QC
Carson Dorfman	Goaltender	United States	20	Hermitage, TN
Noah Giesbrecht	Goaltender	Canada	25	South Surrey, BC; graduate transfer from Ferris State
Will Gilson	Defenseman	United States	23	Old Greenwich, CT; transfer from Alaska Anchorage
Brody Maguire	Defenseman	Canada	20	Calgary, AB
Elliott McDermott	Defenseman	Canada	25	Kingston, ON; graduate transfer from Massachusetts
Gustavs Ozoliņš	Defenseman	Latvia	21	Riga, LAT
Rainers Rullers	Forward	Latvia	19	Riga, LAT
Jagger Tapper	Forward	Canada	20	Calgary, AB
Jordan Tonelli	Forward	United States	24	Armonk, NY; graduate transfer from Brown

== Roster ==
As of September 14, 2024.

No.	Nat.	Player	Class	Pos	Height	Weight	DoB	Hometown	Previous team	NHL rights
2	(United States)	Jimmy Goffredo	Sophomore	D	5' 11" (1.8 m)	185 lb (84 kg)	2003-04-24	Mount Laurel, New Jersey	Des Moines Buccaneers (USHL)	—
4	(Canada)	Elliott McDermott (A)	Graduate	D	5' 11" (1.8 m)	193 lb (88 kg)	1999-02-03	Kingston, Ontario	Massachusetts (HEA)	—
6	(Canada)	Jack Agnew	Graduate	D	5' 11" (1.8 m)	195 lb (88 kg)	2001-10-22	Oakville, Ontario	Boston College (HEA)	—
7	(United States)	Max Smolinski (A)	Junior	F	5' 11" (1.8 m)	180 lb (82 kg)	2003-04-02	Bloomfield Hills, Michigan	Fargo Force (USHL)	—
8	(United States)	William Gilson	Junior	D	6' 0" (1.83 m)	170 lb (77 kg)	2001-06-28	Old Greenwich, Connecticut	Alaska Anchorage (NCAA)	—
9	(United States)	Jordan Tonelli	Graduate	F	6' 0" (1.83 m)	180 lb (82 kg)	2000-06-30	Greenwich, Connecticut	Brown (ECAC)	—
10	(Latvia)	Gustavs Ozoliņš	Freshman	D	5' 10" (1.78 m)	181 lb (82 kg)	2003-06-19	Riga, Latvia	Minnesota Wilderness (NAHL)	—
11	(Latvia)	Rainers Rullers	Freshman	F	6' 4" (1.93 m)	194 lb (88 kg)	2004-12-11	Riga, Latvia	Madison Capitols (USHL)	—
13	(Canada)	Félix Caron	Freshman	F	6' 0" (1.83 m)	168 lb (76 kg)	2004-12-01	Terrebonne, Quebec	West Kelowna Warriors (BCHL)	—
17	(Canada)	John Beaton	Graduate	F	6' 2" (1.88 m)	190 lb (86 kg)	2000-10-30	Stittsville, Ontario	Youngstown Phantoms (USHL)	—
18	(Canada)	Jakob Lee	Graduate	F	6' 0" (1.83 m)	190 lb (86 kg)	1999-02-12	Owen Sound, Ontario	Merrimack (HEA)	—
19	(United States)	Sutter Muzzatti	Junior	F	6' 6" (1.98 m)	240 lb (109 kg)	2003-06-28	Okemos, Michigan	Austin Bruins (NAHL)	NSH, 143rd overall 2023
20	(Canada)	Nathan Sullivan	Sophomore	F	6' 3" (1.91 m)	191 lb (87 kg)	2004-05-31	Calgary, Alberta	Camrose Kodiaks (AJHL)	—
23	(United States)	Nick Strom	Senior	D	6' 0" (1.83 m)	190 lb (86 kg)	2000-03-21	Dayton, Minnesota	Western Michigan (NCHC)	—
24	(United States)	Jack Brackett (A)	Graduate	F	5' 10" (1.78 m)	180 lb (82 kg)	2000-12-31	Manassas, Virginia	Maryland Black Bears (NAHL)	—
25	(Canada)	Dovar Tinling	Senior	F	5' 11" (1.8 m)	185 lb (84 kg)	2003-03-03	Pointe-Claire, Quebec	Penticton Vees (BCHL)	—
27	(Canada)	Jake Gagnon (C)	Graduate	F	5' 10" (1.78 m)	175 lb (79 kg)	1999-11-04	Pointe-Claire, Quebec	Wellington Dukes (OJHL)	—
28	(Canada)	Tyler Hotson	Sophomore	F	6' 0" (1.83 m)	163 lb (74 kg)	2003-03-17	Stratford, Ontario	Sioux City Musketeers (USHL)	—
31	(Canada)	Noah Giesbrecht	Graduate	G	6' 4" (1.93 m)	205 lb (93 kg)	1999-04-18	White Rock, British Columbia	Ferris State (CCHA)	—
32	(United States)	Carson Dorfman	Freshman	G	6' 0" (1.83 m)	179 lb (81 kg)	2003-10-06	Hermitage, Tennessee	Sioux City Musketeers (USHL)	—
34	(Canada)	Jack Watson	Senior	G	6' 3" (1.91 m)	195 lb (88 kg)	2000-03-14	Toronto, Ontario	Coquitlam Express (BCHL)	—
38	(Latvia)	Arvils Bergmanis	Senior	D	5' 11" (1.8 m)	187 lb (85 kg)	1999-12-29	Riga, Latvia	Alaska (NCAA)	—
43	(United States)	Brad McNeil	Sophomore	F	6' 0" (1.83 m)	181 lb (82 kg)	2002-03-15	Royal Oak, Michigan	Maryland Black Bears (NAHL)	—
44	(Canada)	Brody Maguire	Freshman	D	6' 0" (1.83 m)	170 lb (77 kg)	2004-04-08	Calgary, Alberta	Okotoks Oilers (BCHL)	—
61	(Canada)	Lucas Matta	Junior	D	6' 2" (1.88 m)	185 lb (84 kg)	2002-10-04	Kleinburg, Ontario	Western Michigan (BCHL)	—
71	(Canada)	Jérémie Payant	Sophomore	F	5' 10" (1.78 m)	170 lb (77 kg)	2002-10-07	Saint-Lazare, Quebec	Nanaimo Clippers (BCHL)	—
72	(Canada)	Jagger Tapper	Freshman	F	6' 0" (1.83 m)	185 lb (84 kg)	2004-10-01	Calgary, Alberta	Okotoks Oilers (BCHL)	—
82	(Canada)	Mathieu Bourgault	Freshman	F	6' 2" (1.88 m)	176 lb (80 kg)	2003-03-31	Saint-Bruno-de-Montarville, Quebec	Bismarck Bobcats (NAHL)	—

== Standings ==
2024–25 ECAC Hockey Standings
	Conference record										Overall record					
	GP	W	L	T	OTW	OTL	SW	PTS	GF	GA	GP	W	L	T	GF	GA
#15 Quinnipiac †	22	16	5	1	2	3	0	50	79	42	38	24	12	2	135	83
#20 Clarkson	22	15	6	1	2	1	0	45	74	47	39	24	12	3	121	87
Colgate	22	13	7	2	2	2	1	42	80	65	36	18	15	3	114	116
Union	22	12	8	2	0	0	2	40	67	61	36	19	14	3	112	109
Dartmouth	22	12	9	1	0	2	0	39	70	52	33	18	13	2	110	84
#12 Cornell *	22	10	8	4	1	0	3	36	69	53	36	19	11	6	112	82
Harvard	22	9	10	3	2	2	1	31	56	56	33	13	17	3	85	97
Brown	22	9	11	2	3	0	2	28	53	63	32	14	15	3	79	85
Princeton	22	7	12	3	2	2	1	25	55	73	30	12	15	3	71	86
Rensselaer	22	7	15	0	0	2	0	23	57	82	35	12	21	2	101	131
Yale	22	5	14	3	1	1	1	19	52	80	30	6	21	3	67	121
St. Lawrence	22	5	15	2	1	1	1	18	43	81	35	9	24	2	71	121
Championship: March 22, 2025 † indicates conference regular season champion (Cleary Cup) * indicates conference tournament champion (Whitelaw Cup); Rankings: USCHO.com Top 20 Poll

== Schedule and results ==
Date	Time	Opponent^{#}	Rank^{#}	Site	TV	Decision	Result	Attendance	Record
Exhibition
October 6	4:00 pm	at #14 Massachusetts*		Mullins Center • Amherst, Massachusetts (Exhibition)	ESPN+		W 2–1 ^{OT}		
Regular Season
October 11	7:00 pm	at Canisius*		LECOM Harborcenter • Buffalo, New York	FloHockey	Watson	W 6–3	901	1–0–0
October 12	5:00 pm	at Canisius*		LECOM Harborcenter • Buffalo, New York	FloHockey	Giesbrecht	W 8–3	538	2–0–0
October 18	7:00 pm	Niagara*		Houston Field House • Troy, New York	ESPN+	Watson	T 3–3 ^{OT}	2,303	2–0–1
October 19	5:00 pm	Niagara*		Houston Field House • Troy, New York	ESPN+	Giesbrecht	L 4–5 ^{OT}	2,676	2–1–1
October 25	7:00 pm	Union		Houston Field House • Troy, New York (Rivalry)	ESPN+	Watson	L 3–6	2,931	2–2–1 (0–1–0)
October 26	7:00 pm	at Union		Achilles Rink • Schenectady, New York (Rivalry)	ESPN+	Giesbrecht	L 3–4	2,076	2–3–1 (0–2–0)
November 1	7:00 pm	at Miami*		Steve Cady Arena • Oxford, Ohio		Giesbrecht	W 3–2 ^{OT}	1,476	3–3–1
November 2	7:00 pm	at Miami*		Steve Cady Arena • Oxford, Ohio		Giesbrecht	W 2–1	1,622	4–3–1
November 15	7:00 pm	Clarkson		Houston Field House • Troy, New York (Rivalry)	ESPN+	Giesbrecht	L 1–3	2,451	4–4–1 (0–3–0)
November 16	7:00 pm	St. Lawrence		Houston Field House • Troy, New York	ESPN+	Giesbrecht	W 3–2	1,885	5–4–1 (1–3–0)
November 30	7:00 pm	#5 Maine*		Houston Field House • Troy, New York	ESPN+	Giesbrecht	L 0–6	2,117	5–5–1
December 1	3:00 pm	#5 Maine*		Houston Field House • Troy, New York	ESPN+	Watson	L 2–6	1,662	5–6–1
December 6	7:00 pm	at #18 Quinnipiac		M&T Bank Arena • Hamden, Connecticut	ESPN+	Giesbrecht	L 1–3	3,223	5–7–1 (1–4–0)
December 7	7:00 pm	at Princeton		Hobey Baker Memorial Rink • Princeton, New Jersey	ESPN+	Giesbrecht	L 2–6	1,850	5–8–1 (1–5–0)
December 14	3:00 pm	at Mercyhurst*		Mercyhurst Ice Center • Erie, Pennsylvania	FloHockey	Watson	T 3–3 ^{OT}	1,021	5–8–2
December 15	3:00 pm	at Mercyhurst*		Mercyhurst Ice Center • Erie, Pennsylvania	FloHockey	Giesbrecht	W 5–2	1,034	6–8–2
December 28	3:00 pm	New Hampshire*		Houston Field House • Troy, New York	ESPN+	Giesbrecht	L 4–7	2,138	6–9–2
January 3	7:00 pm	at Yale		Ingalls Rink • New Haven, Connecticut	ESPN+	Giesbrecht	W 5–3	1,408	7–9–2 (2–5–0)
January 4	7:00 pm	at Brown		Meehan Auditorium • Providence, Rhode Island	ESPN+	Giesbrecht	W 4–3	1,043	8–9–2 (3–5–0)
January 10	7:00 pm	at St. Lawrence		Appleton Arena • Canton, New York	ESPN+	Giesbrecht	L 1–4	616	8–10–2 (3–6–0)
January 11	7:00 pm	at #19 Clarkson		Cheel Arena • Potsdam, New York (Rivalry)	ESPN+	Giesbrecht	W 4–1	2,732	9–10–2 (4–6–0)
January 17	7:00 pm	Harvard		Houston Field House • Troy, New York	ESPN+	Giesbrecht	L 2–5	1,904	9–11–2 (4–7–0)
January 18	7:00 pm	Dartmouth		Houston Field House • Troy, New York	ESPN+	Giesbrecht	L 3–5	1,709	9–12–2 (4–8–0)
January 25	6:00 pm	vs. Union*		MVP Arena • Albany, New York (Mayor's Cup)		Giesbrecht	L 2–3 ^{OT}	7,306	9–13–2
January 31	7:00 pm	Brown		Houston Field House • Troy, New York	ESPN+	Giesbrecht	L 5–6 ^{OT}	1,475	9–14–2 (4–9–0)
February 1	7:00 pm	Yale		Houston Field House • Troy, New York	ESPN+	Giesbrecht	W 5–2	4,546	10–14–2 (5–9–0)
February 7	7:00 pm	at Cornell		Lynah Rink • Ithaca, New York	ESPN+	Giesbrecht	L 2–4	3,981	10–15–2 (5–10–0)
February 8	7:00 pm	at Colgate		Class of 1965 Arena • Hamilton, New York	ESPN+	Giesbrecht	L 0–4	820	10–16–2 (5–11–0)
February 14	7:00 pm	Princeton		Houston Field House • Troy, New York	ESPN+	Giesbrecht	W 4–1	1,403	11–16–2 (6–11–0)
February 15	7:00 pm	#15 Quinnipiac		Houston Field House • Troy, New York	ESPN+	Giesbrecht	L 2–6	1,762	11–17–2 (6–12–0)
February 21	7:00 pm	at Dartmouth		Thompson Arena • Hanover, New Hampshire	ESPN+	Giesbrecht	W 2–1	1,886	12–17–2 (7–12–0)
February 22	7:00 pm	at Harvard		Bright-Landry Hockey Center • Boston, Massachusetts	ESPN+	Giesbrecht	L 2–3	—	12–18–2 (7–13–0)
February 28	7:00 pm	Colgate		Houston Field House • Troy, New York	ESPN+	Giesbrecht	L 3–4	1,704	12–19–2 (7–14–0)
March 1	7:00 pm	Cornell		Houston Field House • Troy, New York	ESPN+	Giesbrecht	L 0–6	2,232	12–20–2 (7–15–0)
ECAC Hockey Tournament
March 7	7:00 pm	at Harvard*		Bright-Landry Hockey Center • Boston, Massachusetts (ECAC First Round)	ESPN+	Giesbrecht	L 2–5	1,420	12–21–2
*Non-conference game. ^{#}Rankings from USCHO.com Poll. All times are in Eastern Time. Source:

== Scoring statistics ==
Name	Position	Games	Goals	Assists	Points	PIM
Will Gilson	F	35	8	16	24	26
Tyler Hotson	F	35	6	16	22	47
Félix Caron	F	35	6	15	21	62
Jakob Lee	C	35	13	7	20	26
Dovar Tinling	C	32	10	10	20	18
John Beaton	C	34	6	13	19	0
Elliott McDermott	D	35	3	15	18	4
Jack Brackett	F	35	6	11	17	10
Jake Gagnon	RW	33	8	7	15	12
Max Smolinski	D	35	5	10	15	6
Rainers Rullers	D	34	5	8	13	25
Arvils Bergmanis	F	35	4	4	8	22
Jérémie Payant	C	33	3	3	6	6
Brad McNeil	F	35	2	3	5	2
Jimmy Goffredo	D	35	2	3	5	20
Nathan Sullivan	D	21	2	2	4	0
Sutter Muzzatti	F	10	2	1	3	8
Jack Agnew	D	21	1	2	3	4
Gustavs Ozolins	F	31	1	2	3	2
Nick Strom	D	6	0	1	1	2
Jack Watson	G	8	0	1	1	0
Brody Maguire	F	13	0	1	1	8
Noah Giesbrecht	G	30	0	1	1	0
Carson Dorfman	LW	1	0	0	0	0
Lucas Matta	D	19	0	0	0	0
Bench	–	–	–	–	–	4
Total			101	164	265	330

== Goaltending statistics ==
Name	Games	Minutes	Wins	Losses	Ties	Goals against	Saves	Shut outs	SV %	GAA
Carson Dorfman	2	9:02	0	0	0	0	6	0	1.000	0.00
Noah Giesbrecht	30	1727:36	11	19	0	101	878	0	.897	3.51
Jack Watson	8	358:01	1	2	2	23	200	0	.897	3.85
Empty Net	-	26:37	-	-	-	6	-	-	-	-
Total	35	2121:16	12	21	2	131	1084	0	.892	3.71

== Rankings ==
Poll	Week																											
Poll	Pre	1	2	3	4	5	6	7	8	9	10	11	12	13	14	15	16	17	18	19	20	21	22	23	24	25	26	27 (Final)
USCHO.com	NR	NR	NR	NR	NR	NR	NR	NR	NR	NR	NR	NR	–	NR	NR	NR	NR	NR	NR	NR	NR	NR	NR	NR	NR	NR	–	NR
USA Hockey	NR	NR	NR	NR	NR	NR	NR	NR	NR	NR	NR	NR	–	NR	NR	NR	NR	NR	NR	NR	NR	NR	NR	NR	NR	NR	NR	NR

Note: USCHO did not release a poll in week 12 or 26.
Note: USA Hockey did not release a poll in week 12.
