= Clancy Seymour =

Canadian ice hockey player and coach

Playing career
- 1993–1996: Canisius
- Position: Forward

Coaching career (HC unless noted)
- 2002–2004: Canisius (assistant)
- 2004–2005: Canisius

Head coaching record
- Overall: 9–8–3 (.525)

Clancy Seymour (born June 19, 1972) is a former Canadian ice hockey coach and player at the college level. He is currently an instructor at Canisius College in Buffalo, New York.

== Ice Hockey Career ==
Clancy Seymour joined Canisius for the 1993 season while the Golden Griffins were still a Division III team. He spent three years playing for the team before graduating with a degree in physical education in 1996. After also receiving his master's from Canisius Seymour returned to the hockey team as an assistant under his former coach Brian Cavanaugh. Clancy was with the Griffins during their transition from the MAAC to Atlantic Hockey in 2003 but was pressed into service as an interim head coach when a player revolt forced Cavanaugh out in December 2004.

Seymour remained behind the bench for the duration of the campaign but was himself reprimanded for lack of control over his players. While he was not seen as the man to lead the Canisius hockey team out of the turmoil it found itself in, Seymour was able to garner a (slim) winning record and push the Griffins to a second-place finish in the conference. After the season, he was promptly replaced with Dave Smith as the new head coach but, as opposed to the previous AD and head coach, Seymour remained with Canisius College in the academic department.

== Head coaching record ==
Record table
Season	Team	Overall	Conference	Standing	Postseason
Canisius Golden Griffins (Atlantic Hockey) (2004–2005)
2004–05†	Canisius	9–8–3†	8–5–3†	t-2nd	Atlantic Hockey Quarterfinals
Canisius:		9–8–3	8–5–3		
Total:		9–8–3			
National champion Postseason invitational champion Conference regular season champion Conference regular season and conference tournament champion Division regular season champion Division regular season and conference tournament champion Conference tournament champion

†Seymour replaced Brian Cavanaugh midseason
