= 2022–23 RPI Engineers men's ice hockey season =

- Conference: T–7th ECAC Hockey
- Home ice: Houston Field House

Rankings
- USCHO: NR
- USA Today: NR

Record
- Overall: 14–20–1
- Conference: 9–13–0
- Home: 12–6–1
- Road: 2–13–0
- Neutral: 0–1–0

Coaches and captains
- Head coach: Dave Smith
- Assistant coaches: Mathias Lange; Chuck Weber; Liam Thrawl
- Captain: Kyle Hallbauer
- Alternate captain(s): Jakob Lee; Ryan Mahshie; T. J. Walsh

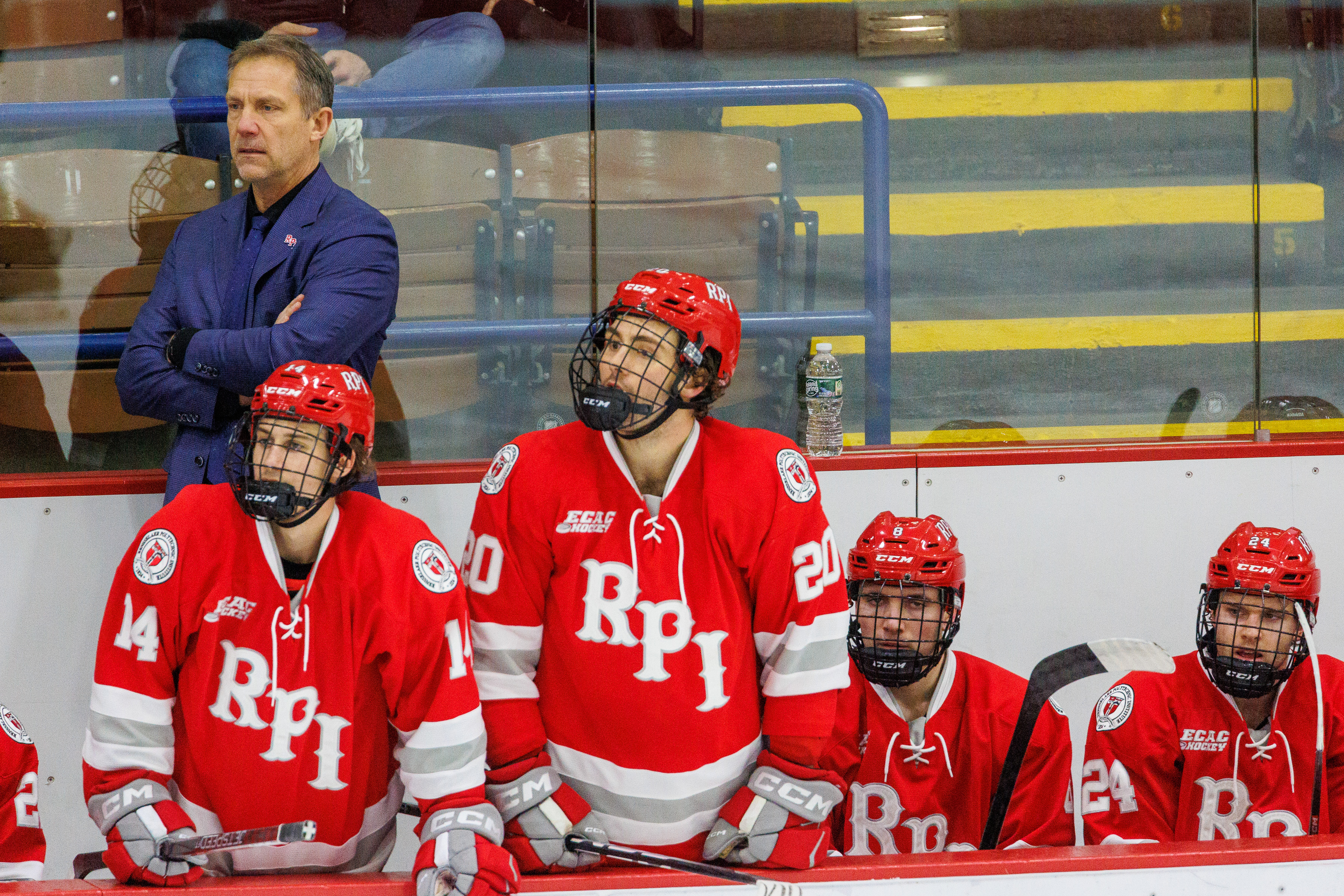
Coach David Smith with players John Evans, Henri Schreifels, James McIsaac, and Jack Brackett.

The 2022–23 RPI Engineers Men's ice hockey season was the 103rd season of play for the program and the 61st in the ECAC Hockey conference. The Engineers represented Rensselaer Polytechnic Institute, played their home games at Houston Field House and were coached by Dave Smith, in his 5th season.

== Season ==
Entering the season, Rensselaer had to contend with the loss of each of their top 6 goal-scorers from last season. Early on, at least, the Engineers didn't appear to miss those players as RPI began the season 4–0. Unfortunately, as soon as the team left the friendly confines of the Houston Field House, the Engineers began to lose. Rensselaer lost its first 9 away game on the year and tumbled down the national rankings. During that stretch a slight lack of offense was apparent for the team and the Engineers scored 30 fewer goals than they had the year before, albeit in 9 fewer games. The bigger problem for the team was the decline in performance in goal. While the defense allowed an average of less the 30 shots against per game, the team saw its goals against average increase by more than half a goal. Jack Watson's less-than-stellar performance in the leading role saw the team regress and finish well below .500.

RPI ended the season in a tie for 7th in the conference standings but were able to receive a home site for the first round. They played host to one of the worst offenses in the nation, Yale, and had a good chance to at least make the quarterfinals. Unfortunately, the troubles with the offense and goaltending were on full display and the Engineers were knocked out with a 1–4 defeat.

== Departures ==
Player	Position	Nationality	Cause
Justin Addamo	Forward	France	Graduation (signed with Wheeling Nailers)
Anthony Baxter	Defenseman	Canada	Graduation (retired)
Nick Bowman	Forward	United States	Graduate transfer to Canisius
Zach Dubinsky	Forward	United States	Transferred to Michigan State
Jake Johnson	Defenseman	United States	Graduate transfer to Quinnipiac
Simon Kjellberg	Defenseman	Sweden	Transferred to Northern Michigan
Jakub Lacka	Forward	Slovakia	Graduation (signed with HK Nitra)
Ottoville Leppänen	Forward	Finland	Graduate transfer to Merrimack
Ture Linden	Forward	United States	Graduate transfer to Penn State
Linden Marshall	Goaltender	Canada	Graduation (signed with Greenville Swamp Rabbits)
Shane Sellar	Forward	United States	Graduation (signed with Reading Royals)

== Recruiting ==
Player	Position	Nationality	Age	Notes
Nicolas Ardanaz	Defenseman	Canada	20	Surrey, BC
Finn Brown	Forward	Canada	20	North York, ON
Brendan Budy	Forward	Canada	22	Langley, BC; transfer from North Dakota
Carson Cherepak	Goaltender	Canada	19	Winnipeg, MB
Danny Ciccarello	Forward	Canada	21	Kirkland, QC
John Evans	Forward	Canada	20	South Surrey, BC
Austin Heidemann	Forward	United States	23	Maple Grove, MN; transfer from Mercyhurst
Sutter Muzzatti	Forward	United States	19	Okemos, MI
Max Smolinski	Defenseman	United States	19	Bloomfield Hills, MI
Nick Strom	Defenseman	United States	22	Dayton, MN; transfer from Western Michigan

== Roster ==
As of December 24, 2022.

No.	Nat.	Player	Class	Pos	Height	Weight	DoB	Hometown	Previous team	NHL rights
1	(Canada)	Carson Cherepak	Freshman	G	6' 0" (1.83 m)	170 lb (77 kg)	2002-10-09	Winnipeg, Manitoba	Dauphin Kings (MJHL)	—
3	(Finland)	Lauri Sertti	Junior	D	6' 2" (1.88 m)	200 lb (91 kg)	1999-07-11	Espoo, Finland	Amarillo Bulls (NAHL)	—
4	(United States)	Mason Klee	Senior	D	6' 2" (1.88 m)	195 lb (88 kg)	1999-10-04	Morrison, Colorado	Sioux Falls Stampede (USHL)	—
6	(Canada)	Jack Agnew	Junior	D	5' 11" (1.8 m)	195 lb (88 kg)	2001-10-22	Oakville, Ontario	Boston College (HEA)	—
7	(United States)	Max Smolinski	Freshman	F	5' 11" (1.8 m)	180 lb (82 kg)	2003-04-02	Bloomfield Hills, Michigan	Fargo Force (USHL)	—
8	(Canada)	James McIsaac	Junior	F	5' 10" (1.78 m)	175 lb (79 kg)	1999-04-29	Winnipeg, Manitoba	Brooks Bandits (AJHL)	—
9	(United States)	Reid Leibold	Sophomore	F	5' 10" (1.78 m)	175 lb (79 kg)	2001-10-23	Ashburn, Virginia	Maryland Black Bears (NAHL)	—
10	(United States)	Dylan Davies	Junior	D	6' 3" (1.91 m)	195 lb (88 kg)	2001-02-09	Traverse City, Michigan	Sioux Falls Stampede (USHL)	—
11	(Canada)	Nick Ardanaz	Freshman	D	5' 10" (1.78 m)	175 lb (79 kg)	2002-05-30	Surrey, British Columbia	West Kelowna Warriors (BCHL)	—
12	(United States)	Austin Heidemann	Junior	F	6' 0" (1.83 m)	195 lb (88 kg)	1999-06-27	Blaine, Minnesota	Mercyhurst (AHA)	—
13	(United States)	T. J. Walsh (A)	Senior	F	5' 8" (1.73 m)	175 lb (79 kg)	2000-04-29	Shrewsbury, Massachusetts	Northeastern (HEA)	—
14	(Canada)	John Evans	Freshman	F	5' 10" (1.78 m)	150 lb (68 kg)	2002-04-08	South Surrey, British Columbia	West Kelowna Warriors (BCHL)	—
15	(Finland)	Altti Nykänen	Junior	F	6' 3" (1.91 m)	200 lb (91 kg)	2001-09-26	Vihti, Finland	Bishop's College School (CISAA)	—
17	(Canada)	John Beaton	Junior	F	6' 2" (1.88 m)	190 lb (86 kg)	2000-10-30	Stittsville, Ontario	Youngstown Phantoms (USHL)	—
18	(Canada)	Jakob Lee (A)	Junior	F	6' 0" (1.83 m)	190 lb (86 kg)	1999-02-12	Owen Sound, Ontario	Merrimack (HEA)	—
19	(United States)	Sutter Muzzatti	Freshman	F	6' 6" (1.98 m)	240 lb (109 kg)	2003-06-28	Okemos, Michigan	Austin Bruins (NAHL)	NSH, 143rd overall 2023
20	(United States)	Henri Schreifels	Sophomore	F	6' 2" (1.88 m)	195 lb (88 kg)	2000-07-01	Newbury Park, California	Victoria Grizzlies (BCHL)	—
22	(Canada)	Danny Ciccarello	Freshman	F	6' 0" (1.83 m)	200 lb (91 kg)	2001-03-23	Kirkland, Quebec	Fort McMurray Oil Barons (AJHL)	—
23	(United States)	Nick Strom	Sophomore	D	6' 0" (1.83 m)	190 lb (86 kg)	2000-03-21	Dayton, Minnesota	Western Michigan (NCHC)	—
24	(United States)	Jack Brackett	Junior	F	5' 10" (1.78 m)	180 lb (82 kg)	2000-12-31	Manassas, Virginia	Maryland Black Bears (NAHL)	—
25	(Canada)	Ryan Mahshie (A)	Senior	F	6' 3" (1.91 m)	215 lb (98 kg)	1999-04-05	Stoney Creek, Ontario	Brooks Bandits (AJHL)	—
27	(Canada)	Jake Gagnon	Junior	F	5' 10" (1.78 m)	175 lb (79 kg)	1999-11-04	Pointe-Claire, Quebec	Wellington Dukes (OJHL)	—
28	(United States)	Kyle Hallbauer (C)	Graduate	D	5' 11" (1.8 m)	190 lb (86 kg)	1997-03-02	Howell, New Jersey	Lone Star Brahmas (NAHL)	—
29	(Canada)	Brendan Budy	Senior	F	5' 11" (1.8 m)	190 lb (86 kg)	2000-06-06	Langley, British Columbia	North Dakota (NCHC)	—
30	(United States)	Brett Miller	Junior	G	6' 2" (1.88 m)	185 lb (84 kg)	1999-04-26	Northville, Michigan	Austin Bruins (NAHL)	—
34	(Canada)	Jack Watson	Sophomore	G	6' 3" (1.91 m)	195 lb (88 kg)	2000-03-14	Toronto, Ontario	Coquitlam Express (BCHL)	—
51	(Canada)	Finn Brown	Freshman	F	6' 3" (1.91 m)	195 lb (88 kg)	2002-04-06	Toronto, Ontario	Alberni Valley Bulldogs (BCHL)	—

== Standings ==
2022–23 ECAC Hockey Standings
	Conference record										Overall record					
	GP	W	L	T	OTW	OTL	SW	PTS	GF	GA	GP	W	L	T	GF	GA
#1 Quinnipiac †	22	20	2	0	0	0	0	60	87	30	41	34	4	3	162	64
#10 Harvard	22	18	4	0	5	0	0	49	86	48	34	24	8	2	125	81
#9 Cornell	22	15	6	1	0	1	0	47	78	42	34	21	11	2	112	66
St. Lawrence	22	12	10	0	1	2	0	37	56	58	36	17	19	0	88	102
#18 Colgate *	22	11	8	3	4	1	3	36	71	58	40	19	16	5	113	109
Clarkson	22	9	10	3	0	1	0	31	60	60	37	16	17	4	102	98
Rensselaer	22	9	13	0	2	1	0	26	52	74	35	14	20	1	84	115
Union	22	8	13	1	0	0	1	26	45	68	35	14	19	2	86	117
Princeton	22	8	14	0	2	1	0	26	57	73	32	13	19	0	89	112
Yale	22	6	14	2	0	1	1	22	35	62	32	8	20	4	57	94
Brown	22	5	14	3	0	1	1	20	41	69	30	9	18	3	65	91
Dartmouth	22	4	17	1	0	2	1	16	44	70	30	5	24	1	64	106
Championship: March 18, 2023 † indicates conference regular season champion (Cleary Cup) * indicates conference tournament champion (Whitelaw Cup); Rankings: USCHO.com Top 20 Poll

== Schedule and results ==
Date	Time	Opponent^{#}	Rank^{#}	Site	TV	Decision	Result	Attendance	Record
Exhibition
October 2	3:00 PM	Toronto*		Houston Field House • Troy, New York (Exhibition)	ESPN+	Cherepak	L 1–2	1,087	
Regular Season
October 7	7:00 PM	Mercyhurst*		Houston Field House • Troy, New York	ESPN+	Watson	W 6–3	1,278	1–0–0
October 8	7:00 PM	Mercyhurst*		Houston Field House • Troy, New York	ESPN+	Watson	W 3–2	1,732	2–0–0
October 14	7:00 PM	Long Island*		Houston Field House • Troy, New York	ESPN+	Watson	W 1–0	1,549	3–0–0
October 15	7:00 PM	Army*		Houston Field House • Troy, New York	ESPN+	Watson	W 7–4	2,085	4–0–0
October 18	7:00 PM	at Canisius*		LECOM Harborcenter • Buffalo, New York	FloHockey	Watson	L 2–3	647	4–1–0
October 21	7:00 PM	USNTDP*		Houston Field House • Troy, New York (Exhibition)	ESPN+	Miller	L 4–7	0	
October 28	7:00 PM	Union		Houston Field House • Troy, New York (Rivalry)	ESPN+	Watson	W 2–1	4,700	5–1–0 (1–0–0)
October 29	7:00 PM	at Union		Achilles Rink • Schenectady, New York (Rivalry)	ESPN+	Watson	L 0–6	2,115	5–2–0 (1–1–0)
November 4	7:00 PM	at St. Lawrence		Appleton Arena • Canton, New York	ESPN+	Watson	L 2–3	1,732	5–3–0 (1–2–0)
November 5	7:00 PM	at Clarkson		Cheel Arena • Potsdam, New York (Rivalry)	ESPN+	Watson	L 0–3	2,659	5–4–0 (1–3–0)
November 11	7:00 PM	at #13 Harvard		Houston Field House • Troy, New York	ESPN+	Watson	L 2–3	2,425	5–5–0 (1–4–0)
November 12	7:00 PM	at Dartmouth		Houston Field House • Troy, New York	ESPN+	Watson	W 2–1	1,810	6–5–0 (2–4–0)
November 18	7:00 PM	Alaska*		Houston Field House • Troy, New York	ESPN+	Watson	L 1–3	1,965	6–6–0
November 19	7:00 PM	Alaska*		Houston Field House • Troy, New York	ESPN+	Watson	T 3–3	1,711	6–6–1
November 25	7:00 PM	at Vermont*		Gutterson Fieldhouse • Burlington, Vermont	ESPN+	Watson	L 3–4 ^{OT}	2,316	6–7–1
November 27	4:00 PM	Vermont*		Houston Field House • Troy, New York	ESPN+	Watson	W 2–1	1,861	7–7–1
December 9	7:00 PM	at #2 Quinnipiac		M&T Bank Arena • Hamden, Connecticut	ESPN+	Cherepak	L 3–8	2,921	7–8–1 (2–5–0)
December 10	7:00 PM	at Princeton		Hobey Baker Memorial Rink • Princeton, New Jersey	ESPN+	Watson	L 5–6	1,575	7–9–1 (2–6–0)
December 29	7:00 PM	at Bowling Green*		Slater Family Ice Arena • Bowling Green, Ohio	FloHockey	Cherepak	L 1–3	1,678	7–10–1
December 30	7:00 PM	at Bowling Green*		Slater Family Ice Arena • Bowling Green, Ohio	FloHockey	Watson	L 2–5	1,989	7–11–1
January 6	7:00 PM	Colgate		Houston Field House • Troy, New York	ESPN+	Watson	W 5–3	1,847	8–11–1 (3–6–0)
January 7	7:00 PM	#18 Cornell		Houston Field House • Troy, New York	ESPN+	Watson	L 4–6	2,724	8–12–1 (3–7–0)
January 13	7:00 PM	at Yale		Ingalls Rink • New Haven, Connecticut	ESPN+	Watson	L 1–4	1,400	8–13–1 (3–8–0)
January 14	7:00 PM	at Brown		Meehan Auditorium • Providence, Rhode Island	ESPN+	Cherepak	L 0–3	798	8–14–1 (3–9–0)
January 20	7:00 PM	Clarkson		Houston Field House • Troy, New York (Rivalry)	ESPN+	Watson	W 3–2	2,723	9–14–1 (4–9–0)
January 21	7:00 PM	St. Lawrence		Houston Field House • Troy, New York	ESPN+	Miller	W 4–3	1,989	10–14–1 (5–9–0)
January 28	6:00 PM	vs. Union*		MVP Arena • Albany, New York (Mayor's Cup)		Watson	L 0–6	5,883	10–15–1
February 3	7:00 PM	at #11 Cornell		Lynah Rink • Ithaca, New York	ESPN+	Miller	L 1–3	3,723	10–16–1 (5–10–0)
February 4	7:00 PM	at Colgate		Class of 1965 Arena • Hamilton, New York	ESPN+	Watson	W 2–1	959	11–16–1 (6–10–0)
February 10	7:00 PM	Brown		Houston Field House • Troy, New York	ESPN+	Watson	L 2–3	2,325	11–17–1 (6–11–0)
February 11	7:00 PM	Yale		Houston Field House • Troy, New York	ESPN+	Watson	W 4–2	4,117	12–17–1 (7–11–0)
February 17	7:00 PM	at Dartmouth		Thompson Arena • Hanover, New Hampshire	ESPN+	Watson	W 3–1	1,267	13–17–1 (8–11–0)
February 18	7:00 PM	at #9 Harvard		Bright-Landry Hockey Center • Boston, Massachusetts	ESPN+	Watson	L 0–4	3,095	13–18–1 (8–12–0)
February 24	7:00 PM	Princeton		Houston Field House • Troy, New York	ESPN+	Watson	W 6–4	2,155	14–18–1 (9–12–0)
February 25	7:00 PM	#2 Quinnipiac		Houston Field House • Troy, New York	ESPN+	Cherepak	L 1–4	2,225	14–19–1 (9–13–0)
ECAC Hockey Tournament
March 4	7:00 PM	Yale*		Houston Field House • Troy, New York (First Round)	ESPN+	Watson	L 1–4	1,556	14–20–1
*Non-conference game. ^{#}Rankings from USCHO.com Poll. All times are in Eastern Time. Source:

== Scoring statistics ==
Name	Position	Games	Goals	Assists	Points	PIM
Ryan Mahshie	F	31	15	7	22	6
Jakob Lee	C	28	10	12	22	61
Sutter Muzzatti	F	35	7	15	22	42
Austin Heidemann	F	34	10	10	20	6
T. J. Walsh	LW	35	7	10	17	4
Jake Gagnon	RW	31	6	10	16	4
Lauri Sertti	D	35	4	11	15	31
Max Smolinski	D	35	3	11	14	16
Kyle Hallbauer	D	35	2	11	13	14
Jack Agnew	D	32	2	10	12	24
John Evans	F	29	5	3	8	6
John Beaton	C	31	2	6	8	4
Mason Klee	D	31	1	6	7	39
Jack Brackett	F	23	3	3	6	2
Nick Strom	D	35	1	5	6	6
Brendan Budy	LW	30	0	5	5	6
Altti Nykänen	F	20	2	2	4	17
Nick Ardanaz	D	20	0	3	3	8
James McIsaac	C/RW	16	2	0	2	23
Danny Ciccarello	F	24	1	1	2	8
Henri Schreifels	F	21	1	0	1	8
Rory Herrman	F	16	0	1	1	10
Dylan Davies	D/F	21	0	1	1	23
Reid Leibold	F	2	0	0	0	0
Brett Miller	G	4	0	0	0	0
Carson Cherepak	G	6	0	0	0	0
Finn Brown	F	10	0	0	0	0
Jack Watson	G	30	0	0	0	0
Total			84	143	227	383

== Goaltending statistics ==
Name	Games	Minutes	Wins	Losses	Ties	Goals against	Saves	Shut outs	SV %	GAA
Jack Watson	30	1695:02	13	15	1	87	740	1	.895	3.08
Carson Cherepak	7	250:37	0	4	0	13	112	0	.896	3.11
Brett Miller	6	149:06	1	1	0	9	50	0	.847	3.62
Empty Net	-	19:56	-	-	-	6	-	-	-	-
Total	35	2114:41	14	20	1	115	902	1	.887	3.26

== Rankings ==
Poll	Week																											
Poll	Pre	1	2	3	4	5	6	7	8	9	10	11	12	13	14	15	16	17	18	19	20	21	22	23	24	25	26	27 (Final)
USCHO.com	NR	-	NR	NR	NR	NR	NR	NR	NR	NR	NR	NR	NR	-	NR	NR	NR	NR	NR	NR	NR	NR	NR	NR	NR	NR	-	NR
USA Today	NR	NR	NR	NR	NR	NR	NR	NR	NR	NR	NR	NR	NR	NR	NR	NR	NR	NR	NR	NR	NR	NR	NR	NR	NR	NR	NR	NR

Note: USCHO did not release a poll in weeks 1, 13, or 26.

== Awards and honors ==
Player	Award	Ref
Sutter Muzzatti	ECAC Hockey Rookie Team	

== Players drafted into the NHL ==
=== 2023 NHL entry draft ===
Round	Pick	Player	NHL team
5	143	Sutter Muzzatti	Nashville Predators

† incoming freshman
