= Ryan Schmelzer =

American ice hockey player (born 1993)

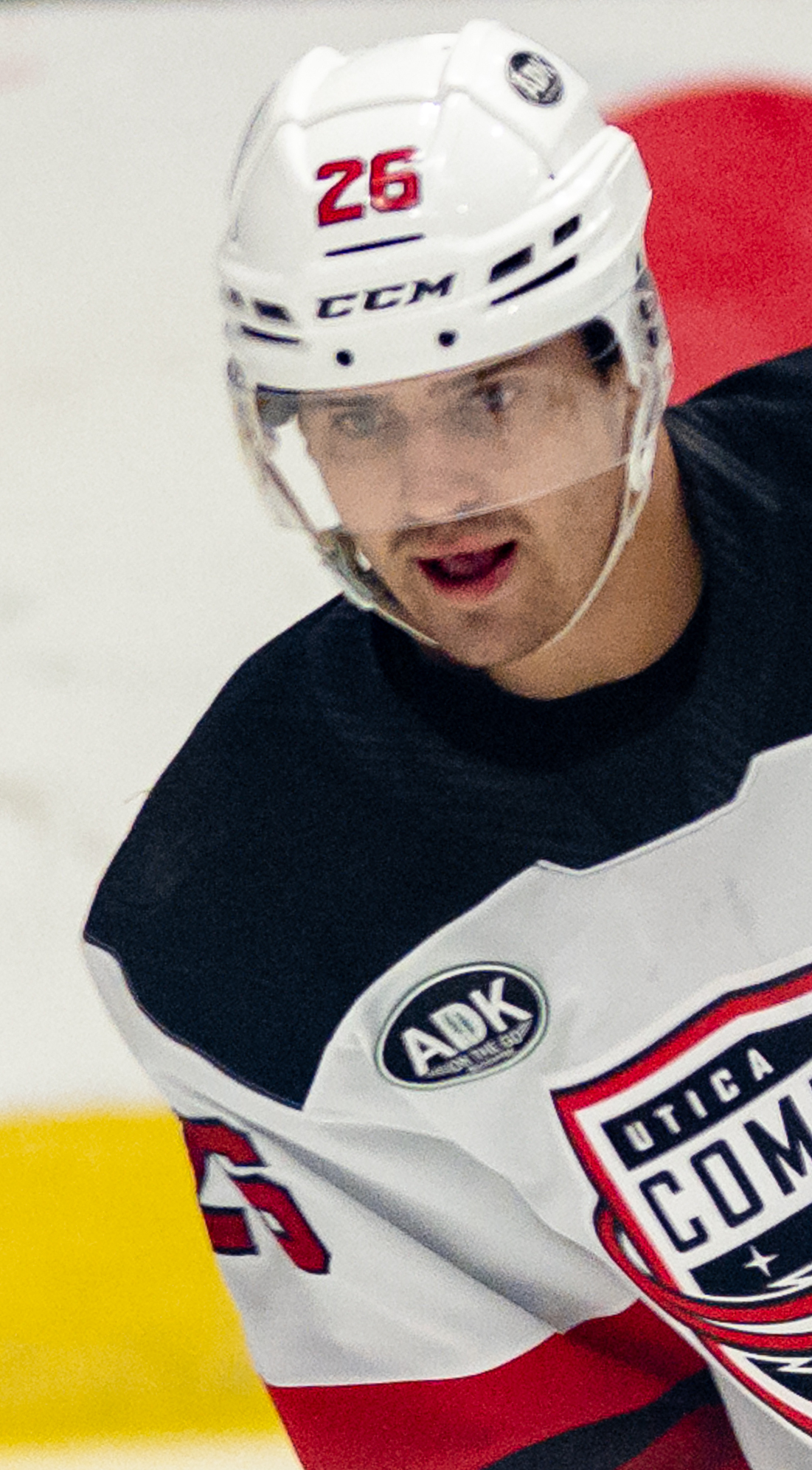
- Schmelzer with the Utica Comets in 2023
- Born: July 28, 1993 (age 33) Cleveland, Ohio, U.S.
- Height: 6 ft 2 in (188 cm)
- Weight: 188 lb (85 kg; 13 st 6 lb)
- Position: Center
- Shoots: Right
- AHL team Former teams: Utica Comets; Binghamton Devils
- NHL draft: Undrafted
- Playing career: 2018–present

Ryan Schmelzer (born July 28, 1993) is an American professional ice hockey center and captain for the Utica Comets of the American Hockey League (AHL).

After going undrafted into the NHL, Schmelzer spent four years playing for the Canisius College Golden Griffins while majoring in management. While attending Canisius, Schmelzer was named the Atlantic Hockey Best Defensive Forward for 2016–17 and earned NCAA Second All-Conference Team honors. Upon concluding his senior year, Schmelzer joined the Adirondack Thunder of the ECHL where he set new franchise records for goals and points in the Kelly Cup playoffs. As a result of his performance with the Thunder, Schmelzer signed a professional contract with the Binghamton Devils of the AHL.

== Personal life ==
Schmelzer was born on July 28, 1993, to parents Roger and Pam Schmelzer. While he was born in Cleveland, Schmelzer was raised in Buffalo, New York. Both Schmelzer's father and younger sister Holly played ice hockey.

== Playing career ==
=== Amateur ===
Growing up in Buffalo, New York, Schmelzer played for the local Amherst Knights program while attending Williamsville East High School. Following the 2009–10 season, Schmelzer played one season with the Wheatfield Blades Junior 'B' club in the Greater Ontario Junior Hockey League before moving up to the Buffalo Jr. Sabres. In his one season with the Blades, Schmelzer tallied 15 goals and 22 assists for 37 points through 50 games. Schmelzer continued to improve on his rookie season with the Sabres and he finished the 2012–13 season with 11 goals and 30 points through 41 games. His efforts were recognized in January with the South-West Conferences Player of the Month honor and the CJHL's First Star of the Month award. His 67 points also helped lead the Jr. Sabres to become the 2012–13 regular season champions of the OJHL's West Division and South-West Conference. Schmelzer also lead the team in postseason scoring as the Jr. Sabres won the franchise's first-ever playoff round. At the conclusion of the season, Schmelzer committed to play National Collegiate Athletic Association Division 1 college hockey with the Canisius College Golden Griffins beginning in the 2014–15 season. He was also being recruited to play for the Army Black Knights by Trevor Large who would later end up coaching Schmelzer at Canisius.

Schmelzer returned to the Jr. Sabres as team captain for the 2013–14 season. Although he experienced a dip in regular season scoring, Schmelzer finished with 17 goals and 24 assists for 41 points through 35 games. During the playoffs, Schmelzer and Michael Ederer led the team in scoring with three goals and five assists in their first round series against the Mississauga Chargers. He finished his OJHL career with 52 goals and 86 assists for 138 points over three seasons.

=== Collegiate ===
Schmelzer spent four years playing for the Canisius Golden Griffins from 2014 to 2018 while majoring in management. He registered his first collegiate point with an assist in the Golden Griffins seasoned opener on October 31. He then added his first collegiate goal on November 8 against the Sacred Heart. As the season continued, Schmelzer became a mainstay center on the Griffins top line with wingers Shane Conacher and Ralph Cuddemi. On January 24, Schmelzer tied a program record for highest plus-minus rating during a win over Niagara University. He also set career highs with two goals and one assist during the win. As a result of his accomplishments, Schmelzer was named the Atlantic Hockey Rookie of the Week on January 27. By the end of January, Schmelzer ranked fourth among NCAA rookie forwards in plus/minus rating while the Griffins ranked second in the conference. Schmelzer finished the 2014–15 season leading all Canisius freshmen with five goals and nine assists for 14 points over 36 games. He was also named to the Atlantic Hockey All-Academic Team and earned Canisius College's Male Rookie of the Year.

While reunited with Cuddemi and Conacher for his sophomore season, Schmelzer centered one of the best offensive lines in college hockey but the Griffins finished the 2015–16 season in seventh place with a 12–22–5 record. Schmelzer improved offensively during his sophomore season, ranking third on the team with 32 points and 10 goals and tied for second with 22 assists. The Griffins beat Niagara University in their first round series but fell in the quarterfinals to the Air Force Falcons.

After Cuddemi and Conacher graduated in 2016, Schmelzer entered his junior year without his usual top line wingers. In spite of this, Schmelzer found success throughout the season and improved to 12 goals and 30 points. In December, Schmelzer was named Atlantic Hockey Conference Player of the Week as the team maintained a 6–8–3 record. While the team finished with a winning 21–11–7 record and their first regular season title, Schmelzer also earned numerous conference accolades. Schmelzer finished the 2016–17 season as the recipient of the Atlantic Hockey Best Defensive Forward Award and NCAA Second All-Conference Team honors.

Prior to the start of his senior year campaign, Schmelzer was named captain of the Griffins for the 2017–18 season. As team captain, Schmelzer helped guide the Griffs to a second-place finish during the regular season by tallying 13 goals and 17 assists for 30 points. As a result of his efforts, Schmelzer was named to the All-Atlantic Hockey Third Team and received the team's Dr. David B. Dietz Hockey Booster Award. He later became the fourth player in Canisius program history to receive the Senior Class Award All-American Award for his efforts on and off the ice.

=== Professional ===
Upon the conclusion of his senior year, Schmelzer signed an amateur tryout contract with the Adirondack Thunder of the ECHL for the remainder of the 2017–18 season. He made an immediate impact upon joining the team, finishing the 2017–18 season with two goals and five assists in seven regular season games. In the Kelly Cup playoffs, Schmelzer appeared in all 17 games while setting numerous franchise records. His nine goals and 17 points were the most ever accumulated in a single playoff season.

Following the Thunder's elimination, Schmelzer signed a one-year contract with the Binghamton Devils of the American Hockey League (AHL) and was chosen to represent the New Jersey Devils at the 2018 Buffalo Sabres Prospects Challenge. After participating in the prospect challenge, Schmelzer was invited to New Jersey's training camp before being reassigned to the AHL for the 2018–19 season. Schmelzer made his AHL debut on October 13, 2018, and recorded his first professional assist four games later. He recorded his first AHL goal on November 2, against the Lehigh Valley Phantoms. Over his first eight games with the Binghamton, Schmelzer accumulated two goals and one assist. Following an illegal check to the head in a game against the Utica Comets on December 8, Schmelzer was suspended for two games. He improved as the season continued and by March had accumulated 10 goals and six assists for 16 points over 55 regular season games. While Schmelzer finished fifth on the team in goals with 14, Binghamton finished the season last in the North Division with a 28–41–7 record. At the conclusion of his rookie season, Schmelzer signed a one-year AHL contract extension to remain with the team.

Following the signing of his new contract, Schmelzer again participated in New Jersey's training camp but was reassigned to the AHL for the 2019–20 season. Although Schmelzer played fewer games in 2019–20 due to the COVID-19 pandemic, he matched his previous season's points total of 24. In the first week of March, Schmelzer was selected as the CCM/AHL Player of the Week after he registered two goals and four assists for six points over three games. While the AHL season was suspended, Schmelzer trained in his home in Fort Erie, Ontario, using propane tanks, water cases, and paint cans as weights. On July 13, 2020, he signed a one-year AHL contract extension to remain with Binghamton.

Due to the effects of the COVID-19 pandemic, the New Jersey Devils chose to move their AHL affiliate to their practice rink for home games in Newark, New Jersey, for the 2020–21 season. Following the conclusion of the season, the Binghamton Devils dissolved and the Utica Comets became New Jersey's AHL affiliate. On July 20, 2021, Schmelzer signed an AHL contract with the Comets for the forthcoming 2021–22 season. Prior to the start of the 2021–22 season, Schmelzer was named captain of the Comets. As captain, Schmelzer helped lead the Comets to a perfect 12–0–0 record to start the season, the best start in the AHL's history. Their streak was snapped at 13 games following a loss to the Rochester Americans on November 24. Under new head coach Kevin Dineen, Schmelzer put up a career high 18 goals and 32 points through 64 games to rank sixth on the team in scoring. As the Comets finished the regular season as the AHL's North Division champions, they earned a bye in the Calder Cup playoffs and met with the Americans in the second round.

After finishing the 2023–24 season with a career-high 18 goals and 34 assists, Schmelzer signed a two-year, two-way contract with the New Jersey Devils on April 30, 2024.

== Career statistics ==
			Regular season					Playoffs
Season	Team	League	GP	G	A	Pts	PIM	GP	G	A	Pts	PIM
2010–11	Wheatfield Jr. Blades	GOJHL	50	15	22	37	34	4	0	2	2	4
2010–11	Buffalo Jr. Sabres	OJHL	4	0	0	0	0	—	—	—	—	—
2011–12	Buffalo Jr. Sabres	OJHL	41	11	19	30	26	8	4	7	11	10
2012–13	Buffalo Jr. Sabres	OJHL	51	24	43	67	54	10	5	5	10	2
2013–14	Buffalo Jr. Sabres	OJHL	35	17	24	41	22	11	3	7	10	4
2014–15	Canisius College	AHA	36	5	9	14	10	—	—	—	—	—
2015–16	Canisius College	AHA	38	10	22	32	58	—	—	—	—	—
2016–17	Canisius College	AHA	37	12	18	30	43	—	—	—	—	—
2017–18	Canisius College	AHA	32	13	17	30	20	—	—	—	—	—
2017–18	Adirondack Thunder	ECHL	7	2	5	7	4	17	9	8	17	24
2018–19	Binghamton Devils	AHL	66	14	10	24	42	—	—	—	—	—
2019–20	Binghamton Devils	AHL	52	7	17	24	14	—	—	—	—	—
2020–21	Binghamton Devils	AHL	15	2	5	7	6	—	—	—	—	—
2021–22	Utica Comets	AHL	64	18	14	32	26	5	1	1	2	0
2022–23	Utica Comets	AHL	68	6	29	35	35	6	3	1	4	2
2023–24	Utica Comets	AHL	72	18	34	52	38	—	—	—	—	—
2024–25	Utica Comets	AHL	72	23	21	44	57	—	—	—	—	—
2025–26	Utica Comets	AHL	66	4	23	27	44	—	—	—	—	—
AHL totals			475	92	153	245	272	11	4	2	6	2

Awards and achievements
Preceded by Ben Carey	Atlantic Hockey Best Defensive Forward; 2016–17	Succeeded by Jack Riley
