= Utica Comets =

American Hockey League team in Utica, New York

- City: Utica, New York
- League: American Hockey League
- Conference: Eastern
- Division: North
- Founded: 1932 (first franchise); 1998 (second franchise)
- Home arena: NBT Bank Arena at the Utica Memorial Auditorium
- Colors: Red, black, white
- Owners: Harris Blitzer Sports & Entertainment; (Josh Harris and David Blitzer)
- President: Robert Esche
- General manager: Braden Birch
- Head coach: Ryan Parent
- Captain: Ryan Schmelzer
- Media: WKLL (94.9 FM); Observer-Dispatch; WKTV NewsChannel 2 WUTR Eyewitness News; AHL.TV (Internet)
- Affiliates: New Jersey Devils (NHL); Adirondack Thunder (ECHL)

Franchise history
- First franchise
- 1932–1935 1935–1951: Quebec Beavers; Springfield Indians
- 1951–1954 1954–1967: Syracuse Warriors; Springfield Indians
- 1967–1974 1974–1994: Springfield Kings; Springfield Indians
- 1994–2005 2005–2013: Worcester IceCats; Peoria Rivermen
- 2013–2021: Utica Comets
- 2021–present: Abbotsford Canucks
- Second franchise
- 1998–2006 2006–2010: Lowell Lock Monsters; Lowell Devils
- 2010–2017: Albany Devils
- 2017–2021: Binghamton Devils
- 2021–present: Utica Comets

Championships
- Division titles: 2 (2014–15, 2021–22)
- Conference titles: 1 (2014–15)

The Utica Comets are a professional ice hockey team based in Utica, New York. They are members of the North Division in the Eastern Conference of the American Hockey League (AHL) and affiliated with the National Hockey League's (NHL) New Jersey Devils. The Comets play their home games at the Adirondack Bank Center. The team was established when the Vancouver Canucks relocated their AHL franchise to Utica for the 2013–14 season.

The Comets are the second AHL team to call Utica home; another New Jersey Devils-affiliated team, the Utica Devils played in the city from 1987 until 1993. Before the 2021–22 AHL season, the Canucks relocated the franchise used by the Comets to Abbotsford, British Columbia, and the Devils relocated their franchise, the then-Binghamton Devils, to Utica to play as the Comets. As with the Devils, the Comets are owned by Josh Harris and David Blitzer under Harris Blitzer Sports & Entertainment (HBSE).

== History ==
=== Establishment of the Comets ===
On March 29, 2013, a deal was announced for the Peoria Rivermen franchise to be purchased by Canucks Sports & Entertainment (CS&E), owners of the National Hockey League's (NHL) Vancouver Canucks. The deal was later approved by the American Hockey League (AHL) on April 18. The Canucks-owned franchise is one of the oldest professional hockey franchises in existence, dating back to 1932, when the team was known as the Quebec Beavers. In 1935, the franchise moved to Springfield and became the Indians, reviving the name after the original Indians franchise ceased operations during the 1932–33 Canadian-American Hockey League season. In addition to the Indians, the team has been known as the Syracuse Warriors, Springfield Kings, Worcester IceCats and then the Rivermen.

After purchasing the franchise, CS&E intended to have the franchise located in a market close to Vancouver, British Columbia. Their initial preference was Abbotsford, British Columbia, which was home to the Calgary Flames' AHL farm club, the Abbotsford Heat. The Heat had been rumored to have plans to relocate to Utica at the time. Negotiations between the Canucks and Abbotsford broke down by April 22, ensuring the Heat would remain in the city. Media reports speculated that the Canucks would move the team to Vancouver and share Rogers Arena, which is also owned by CS&E, with the Canucks. This proved impossible as Vancouver is within Abbotsford's 50-mile territorial radius provided by the AHL. A reported plan to have the team play in Seattle's KeyArena was disallowed by the NHL, as Seattle was reportedly a candidate to land the troubled Phoenix Coyotes franchise. However, the Coyotes eventually found a new owner with intentions to keep the franchise in Arizona and Seattle eventually received an expansion team in the Seattle Kraken to play in the arena.

By May 2013, CS&E's options for the franchise were dwindling; it did consider keeping the franchise in Peoria, but notified the city on May 13 it would not operate in that city, and the Rivermen were replaced by a Southern Professional Hockey League team of the same name. CS&E did consider placing the franchise in dormancy for the 2013–14 season, with the Canucks loaning their AHL prospects to other teams. Facing an extended deadline by the AHL to find a new home, CS&E agreed to a deal with Utica, New York, to relocate the franchise to the city's soon-to-be-renovated Memorial Auditorium. The deal was confirmed on June 14 with an official announcement revealing the Utica Comets name and affiliation, along with logo and jerseys patterned after the Canucks' blue, green and silver color scheme. The Comets' nickname honors several prior professional hockey teams in the Mohawk Valley, most notably the Clinton and Mohawk Valley Comets, which played from 1927 until 1977 (as the Mohawk Valley Comets, they called the Memorial Auditorium home); the Atlantic Coast Hockey League's Mohawk Valley Comets, which played from 1985 until 1987; and a third team of the same name, which played in the North Eastern Hockey League during the 2003–04 season.

=== Vancouver Canucks affiliation (2013–2021) ===
After establishing the team, CS&E began hiring operations personnel. Travis Green became the first head coach, while Paul Jerrard and Nolan Baumgartner were named assistant coaches, and Pat Conacher was hired as the director of hockey operations. Utica played its first game on October 11, 2013, a 4–1 loss to the Rochester Americans. In the game, Pascal Pelletier scored the first goal in Comets' history. Utica lost two more games before making their home debut. Before the game, the Comets celebrated the region's hockey history with a slide show, Gordie Howe dropped the ceremonial puck and the Hanson Brothers from the movie Slap Shot made an appearance. Utica lost the game 4–1 to the Albany Devils. One week after their home opener, Colin Stuart was named team captain. The Comets finished their debut season with 35 victories and 79 points, four points behind the last spot of the playoffs. Seventeen of the team's thirty-eight home games were sold out.

Comets' logo from 2013 to 2021 with colors reflecting those of the Canucks.

Before the 2014–15 season, Cal O'Reilly was named the team's new captain. The Comets saw much improvement in their second season, and after Sven Baertschi and Cory Conacher were acquired in trades, the team soon dominated the Western Conference, finishing the regular season as the top seed. During the playoffs, the Comets won the Robert W. Clarke Trophy as Western Conference champions, advancing to the Calder Cup finals against the Manchester Monarchs; the Comets would fall to the Monarchs in five games. Following the season, O'Reilly joined his brother Ryan with the Buffalo Sabres.

The 2015–16 season saw the departure of many Comets players. Jacob Markstrom became the backup goaltender for the Canucks, Brendan Gaunce and newly-named captain Alex Biega also spent significant time with the Canucks, while Nicklas Jensen and Hunter Shinkaruk were traded mid-season to the New York Rangers and Calgary Flames, respectively. The Comets placed third in the North Division, which was moved to the Eastern Conference at the start of the season. They were eliminated in the first round of the 2016 playoffs, losing the series 3–1 to the Albany Devils.

At the start of the 2016–17 season, Carter Bancks was named team captain, replacing Alex Biega, who became a full-time player for the Canucks. The Comets were unable to clinch a playoff berth, falling four points short. However, the team managed to sellout every home game, extending their sellout streak.

On April 26, 2017, the Canucks hired Green as their new head coach after leading the Comets to a 155–110–39 record through their first four seasons. He was replaced by Trent Cull as head coach of the Comets. The Comets continued their sellout streak through the 2017–18 season. They qualified for the 2018 playoffs as the fourth seed in the North Division. They lost the opening round in five games to the Toronto Marlies, the eventual Calder Cup champions.

On October 19, 2018, the Utica Comets sold out their 121st consecutive regular season game, establishing a new AHL record. They also sold out all of their 17 playoff games hosted during this span, for a combined streak of 138 consecutive sellouts. They reached 200 consecutive regular season sellouts on February 29, 2020.

On December 29, 2018, during the final season of their initial six-year affiliation agreement, the Canucks and Comets extended their affiliation agreement for up to an additional six years, with potential opt outs every two seasons.

The Comets played their first 61 games of the 2019–20 season, but the last 15 games of the season were postponed on March 12, 2020, due to the COVID-19 pandemic and then cancelled entirely. The start of the 2020–21 season was also pushed back to February 2021. The Comets also agreed to a one-year dual affiliation with the St. Louis Blues after the Springfield Thunderbirds opted out of the 2020–21 season. Prior to the pandemic-related schedule changes, the Comets planned to host the Syracuse Crunch in an outdoor game at the Griffiss Business and Technology Park in Rome, New York, on February 13, 2021, however, the game was not held as the season had not started.

=== New Jersey Devils affiliation (2021–present) ===
In April 2021, a new trademark was filed for the brand Utica Devils by Robert Esche, the president of the Utica Comets, for a potential relocation of the Binghamton Devils. On May 4, the Canucks announced that they plan to relocate the Comets' franchise to Abbotsford, British Columbia, pending final discussions with the city of Abbotsford and league approval. On May 6, the league approved of both relocations while the Comets and the Devils announced a ten-year affiliation agreement for the Comets to operate the Devils' AHL franchise. The Utica team remained branded as the Comets but changed their team colors to match the Devils. Kevin Dineen was brought on as the first head coach under the Devils' affiliation.

The Comets started the 2021–22 AHL season with an 11–game winning streak, tying the 1984–85 Rochester Americans for the most consecutive wins to start a season by an AHL team. They would win their next game against the Charlotte Checkers to break the previous record, with a 12–0–0–0 record to start the regular season. Their streak was snapped at 13 games following a loss to the Rochester Americans on November 24. The Comets would use this winning streak to help them finish with a North division regular season championship, and with the best points percentage in the Eastern Conference. They would have a bye in the first round, but would lose in five games to the Rochester Americans in the North Division Semifinals.

During the 2025–26 season, the Comets were 18 points out of a playoff position as late as February 17 of that season. However, the Comets went on a 16–7–1–1 run to end their season, being tied with Rochester for the final playoff spot on the final day of the regular season, whilst having the tiebreaker over Rochester in regulation wins. However, with Rochester just needing one point to clinch a playoff position, Rochester was able to force overtime in their final game of the season to take the final position, eliminating Utica from the playoffs.

== Season-by-season results ==
Regular season											Playoffs					
Season	Games	Won	Lost	OTL	SOL	Points	PCT	Goals for	Goals against	Standing	Year	Prelims	1st round	2nd round	3rd round	Finals
2013–14	76	35	32	5	4	79	.520	187	216	3rd, North	2014	Did not qualify				
2014–15	76	47	20	7	2	103	.678	219	182	1st, North	2015	—	W, 3–2, CHI	W, 4–3, OKC	W, 4–2, GR	L, 1–4, MCH
2015–16	76	38	26	8	4	88	.579	224	217	3rd, North	2016	—	L, 1–3, ALB	—	—	—
2016–17	76	35	32	7	2	79	.520	195	220	5th, North	2017	Did not qualify				
2017–18	76	38	26	8	4	88	.579	211	216	4th, North	2018	—	L, 2–3, TOR	—	—	—
2018–19	76	34	34	6	2	76	.500	224	257	6th, North	2019	Did not qualify				
2019–20	61	34	22	3	2	73	.598	210	186	3rd, North	2020	Season cancelled due to the COVID-19 pandemic				
2020–21	28	16	11	0	1	33	.589	89	88	4th, North	2021	No playoffs were held				
2021–22	72	43	20	8	1	95	.660	246	206	1st, North	2022	BYE	L, 2–3, ROC	—	—	—
2022–23	72	35	27	6	4	80	.556	215	222	4th, North	2023	W, 2–0, LAV	L, 1–3, TOR	—	—	—
2023–24	72	32	29	5	6	75	.521	221	226	6th, North	2024	Did not qualify				
2024–25	72	31	33	6	2	70	.486	196	223	7th, North	2025	Did not qualify				
2025–26	72	30	31	6	5	71	.493	199	220	6th, North	2026	Did not qualify				

== Players ==
=== Current roster ===
As of October 23, 2026.

No.	Nat	Player	Pos	S/G	Age	Acquired	Birthplace	Contract
58	(Canada)	Mikael Diotte	D	R	23	2024	Sainte-Julie, Quebec	Devils
73	(Canada)	Ethan Edwards	D	L	24	2025	Grande Prairie, Alberta	Devils
19	(Canada)	Josh Filmon	LW	L	22	2024	Winnipeg, Manitoba	Devils
62	(Canada)	Zach Gallant	C	L	27	2026	London, Ontario	Comets
29	(Finland)	Lenni Hameenaho	RW	R	22	2025	Kajaani, Finland	Devils
33	(United States)	D. J. King	D	L	26	2026	Scottsdale, Arizona	Comets
64	(Canada)	Gabe Klassen	C	L	23	2026	Prince Albert, Saskatchewan	Comets
18	(Belarus)	Vladislav Kolyachonok	D	L	25	2026	Minsk, Belarus	Devils
20	(United States)	Shane Lachance	LW	L	23	2025	Andover, Massachusetts	Devils
31	(Czech Republic)	Jakub Malek	G	L	24	2025	Kromeriz, Czech Republic	Devils
13	(United States)	Jack Malone	RW	R	26	2024	Danville, California	Comets
28	(United States)	Marc McLaughlin (A)	C	R	27	2025	North Billerica, Massachusetts	Devils
21	(Czech Republic)	Matyas Melovsky	C	R	22	2025	Unicov, Czech Republic	Devils
5	(Canada)	Étienne Morin	D	L	21	2026	Salaberry-de-Valleyfield, Quebec	Devils
11	(United States)	Stefan Noesen	RW	R	33	2026	Plano, Texas	Devils
44	(Russia)	Dmitry Osipov	D	R	30	2024	Moscow, Russia	Comets
67	(Canada)	Xavier Parent	LW	L	25	2022	Laval, Quebec	Devils
24	(United States)	Justin Pearson	LW	L	28	2026	Nashua, New Hampshire	Comets
2	(United States)	Eamon Powell	D	R	24	2026	Marcellus, New York	Comets
33	(Czech Republic)	David Rittich	G	L	34	2026	Jihlava, Czechoslovakia	Devils
26	(United States)	Ryan Schmelzer (C)	C	R	33	2021	Buffalo, New York	Comets
52	(Russia)	Anton Silayev	D	L	20	2026	Sarov, Russia	Devils
12	(Canada)	Cam Squires	RW	R	21	2025	Charlottetown, Prince Edward Island	Devils
6	(United States)	Ben Steeves	LW	L	24	2026	Bedford, New Hampshire	Devils
27	(United States)	Riley Tufte (A)	LW	L	28	2026	Coon Rapids, Minnesota	Devils
38	(Finland)	Topias Vilen	D	L	23	2023	Lahti, Finland	Devils
36	(United States)	Colin White	C	R	29	2026	Boston, Massachusetts	Devils
16	(United States)	Jeremy Wilmer	LW	L	23	2026	Rockville Centre, New York	Comets

=== Team captains ===
There have been four players who have served as the captain in the first franchise, and one in the second. Colin Stuart was the first franchise's first captain, who was appointed until he left the team as a free agent in 2014, while Ryan Schmelzer is the first and current captain of the second franchise, holding the position since his appointment in 2021. Carter Bancks and Ryan Schmelzer are tied as the longest-tenured captains of either franchise, having both held the position for four seasons.

==== First franchise ====
- Colin Stuart, 2013–2014
- Cal O'Reilly, 2014–2015
- Alex Biega, 2015–2016
- Carter Bancks, 2016–2020

==== Second franchise ====
- Ryan Schmelzer, 2021–present

=== American Hockey League Hall of Famers ===
AHL Hall of Fame Honored Members
Name	Seasons	Induction Year
Nolan Baumgartner	2013-17 (asst. coach)	2022
Michael Leighton	2018-19 (player)	2025
