= Chuck Weber (ice hockey) =

American ice hockey coach

Current position
- Title: Assistant coach
- Team: Rensselaer
- Conference: ECAC Hockey

Biographical details
- Born: March 18, 1973 (age 53); Lockport, New York, USA

Coaching career (HC unless noted)
- 1999–2001: Orlando Solar Bears (assistant)
- 2001–2002: Trenton Titans (assistant)
- 2002–2003: Milwaukee Admirals (assistant)
- 2003–2005: Augusta Lynx (assistant)
- 2005–2006: Utah Grizzlies (assistant)
- 2006–2010: Cincinnati Cyclones
- 2010–2011: Rochester Americans
- 2011–2013: San Antonio Rampage
- 2013–2014: San Antonio Rampage (assistant)
- 2014: Medveščak Zagreb
- 2014–2016: Coventry Blaze
- 2016–2017: Rochester Americans (assistant)
- 2017–2018: Atlanta Gladiators
- 2018–Present: Rensselaer (assistant)

Chuck Weber (born March 18, 1973) is an American ice hockey coach.

From 2006 to 2010, Weber was the head coach of the Cincinnati Cyclones of the ECHL. Weber was named the Coach of the Year, winning the John Brophy Award for the 2007–08 season.

At the end of the 2009–10 season, he was promoted to be the head coach of the Cyclones' American Hockey League (AHL) affiliate, the Rochester Americans. After one season in Rochester, their National Hockey League affiliate, the Florida Panthers changed their AHL affiliation to the San Antonio Rampage. Weber was then named head coach of the Rampage. In 2013, Weber was reassigned to the Panthers' organization to be the Rampage's director of hockey operations while also having his coaching duties reduced to an associate position.

In June 2014, Weber once again took a head coaching position and moved to the Kontinental Hockey League and the Medveščak Zagreb. However, he would only last three months with the team before being relieved of duties. He stayed overseas and became head coach of the Coventry Blaze in the Elite Ice Hockey League (EIHL) in December 2014. While at Coventry, he took the Blaze from ninth to sixth place and qualified for the playoffs. He led the Blaze to a 5–4 aggregate victory over the Nottingham Panthers in the quarterfinals and a place in the EIHL final four weekends. In the semifinals, they beat the Belfast Giants 3–2 after a shootout They then faced the EIHL regular season champion Sheffield Steelers, winning 4-2 and becoming the lowest seed to ever win the EIHL playoffs. At the end of the season, Weber was announced as returning to the Blaze for 2015–16. Despite an eighth-place regular season finish, he took the team into the playoffs and once again made the league final. The Blaze then lost to the Nottingham Panthers 2–0. At the end of the season, he announced he would not be remaining with Coventry.

In 2016, Weber returned to the Rochester Americans as an assistant coach.

On August 8, 2017, Weber was named as the fifth head coach and general manager of hockey operations for the ECHL's Atlanta Gladiators. Weber would then leave after one season to take an assistant coaching position with Rensselaer Polytechnic Institute (RPI) NCAA Div. I men's team to be closer to home.
