= Brian Cavanaugh =

Coaching career (HC unless noted)
- 1980–1982: Canisius
- 1983–2004: Canisius

Administrative career (AD unless noted)
- 2005–2006: D'Youville (assistant AD)
- 2006–2019: D'Youville

Head coaching record
- Overall: 342-306-56 (.526)

Brian Cavanaugh is a former ice hockey coach who led Canisius for 23 years before being fired during the 2004-05 season. Though he had established himself over a long tenure with the Golden Griffins, leading them to becoming a Division I program, Cavanaugh was fired by the athletic director in December 2004 due to a slew of complaints from the team. He has since retired as the athletic director at D'Youville College.

== Head coaching record ==
Record table
Season	Team	Overall	Conference	Standing	Postseason
Canisius Golden Griffins (ECAC West) (1980–1982)
1980-81	Canisius	13-12-2			
1981-82	Canisius	16-12-1			
Canisius:		29-24-3			
Canisius Golden Griffins (ECAC West) (1983–1998)
1983-84	Canisius	5-21-1			
1984-85	Canisius	15-12-2			
1985-86	Canisius	18-9-2			
1986-87	Canisius	21-11-0			
1987-88	Canisius	15-12-0	10-7-0		
1988-89	Canisius	15-19-1	13-9-0		
1989-90	Canisius	12-14-2	11-14-2		
1990-91	Canisius	9-18-0	8-16-0		
1991-92	Canisius	12-14-2	11-14-2		
1992-93	Canisius	18-11-1	17-6-1		
1993-94	Canisius	17-8-1	7-3-0		
1994-95	Canisius	16-6-4	4-2-2		
1995-96	Canisius	18-7-2	6-3-1		
1996-97	Canisius	13-11-2	1-8-2		
1997-98	Canisius	12-11-3	4-5-1		
Canisius:		216-184-23	92-87-11		
Canisius Golden Griffins (MAAC) (1998–2003)
1998-99	Canisius	16-15-5	12-11-5	4th	MAAC Runner-Up
1999-00	Canisius	21-10-4	16-8-3	3rd	MAAC Quarterfinals
2000-01	Canisius	17-12-4	13-9-4	4th	MAAC Semifinals
2001-02	Canisius	14-17-4	13-9-4	5th	MAAC Quarterfinals
2002-03	Canisius	12-21-4	11-13-2	7th	MAAC Quarterfinals
Canisius:		80-75-21	65-50-18		
Canisius Golden Griffins (Atlantic Hockey) (2003–2005)
2003-04	Canisius	10-16-8	9-11-4	6th	Atlantic Hockey Semifinals
2004-05 †	Canisius	7-7-1 †	6-2-0 †		
Canisius:		17-23-9	15-13-4		
Total:		342-306-56			
National champion Postseason invitational champion Conference regular season champion Conference regular season and conference tournament champion Division regular season champion Division regular season and conference tournament champion Conference tournament champion

† Cavanaugh was fired mid-season
