= Canisius Golden Griffins men's ice hockey =

- Current season
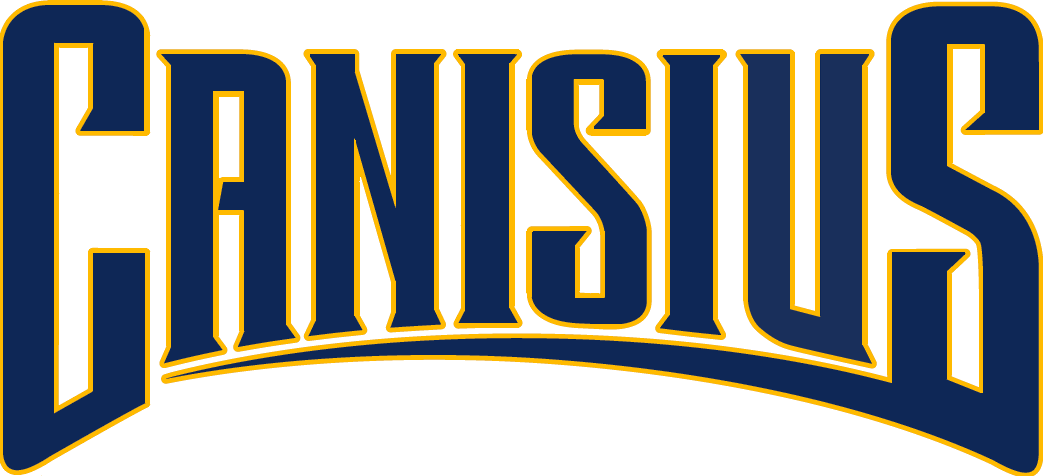
- University: Canisius University
- Conference: AHA
- Head coach: Trevor Large; 10th season, 129–158–27 (.454)
- Assistant coaches: Max Mobley; Matt Hoover
- Arena: LECOM Harborcenter; Buffalo, New York
- Colors: Blue and gold

NCAA tournament appearances
- 2013, 2023

Conference tournament champions
- AHA: 2013, 2023

Conference regular season champions
- ECAC West: 1996; AHA: 2017

Current uniform

The Canisius Golden Griffins men's ice hockey team is a National Collegiate Athletic Association (NCAA) Division I college ice hockey program that represents Canisius University. The Golden Griffins are members of Atlantic Hockey America, formed shortly after the 2023–24 season by the merger of their former hockey league, the Atlantic Hockey Association, with College Hockey America. They play at the LECOM Harborcenter in Buffalo, New York across the street from KeyBank Center, home of the Buffalo Sabres of the National Hockey League. Canisius has won an automatic bid to the NCAA Men's Ice Hockey Tournament twice, after winning the Atlantic Hockey title in the conference playoffs in both 2013 and 2023, but lost in the first round to the top-ranked team each time.

== History ==
=== Early years ===
Canisius founded its hockey team, then known as the Ice Griffs, in the fall of 1971 as a club sport led by Dr. David Dietz. Two years later they joined their first conference and by 1976 had claimed two conference titles. Dietz resigned after the 1976 championship and allowed Mike Kelly to take over. Kelly kept the team performing at a high level but finished runner up two years running before reclaiming the title in 1979. Canisius join a new conference the following year and after claiming the championship, their fourth in a six-year span, the program was elevated to varsity status.

With a new division to play in Canisius also received a new coach in Brian Cavanaugh. Their first two seasons in Division III went well for the Golden Griffins but when Cavanaugh took a year off in 1982 the program slumped to single-digit wins before rebounding after the coach's return. During Cavanaugh's tenure he kept the team mostly above .500 and aside from a dip in the early 1990s Canisius was a contender for the ECAC West crown most years. Canisius was able to reach two ECAC West title game in the '90s but lost both contests by one goal.

=== Division I ===
When the MAAC announced it was forming an ice hockey division in 1997 only three member teams had extant programs, one of those was Canisius who became a founding member of the league that began play in 1998–99. The Golden Griffins played well in their first season, finishing with a winning record, but it was their play in the conference tournament, allowing them to reach the title match, that made Canisius stand out. Unfortunately that was the height of Canisius' time in the MAAC. Despite a 20-win season the following year the Griffs were bounced in the first round and won only one MAAC playoff game after their inaugural year in D-I.

When two of the MAAC's teams ended their ice hockey sponsorship in 2003 the conference was able to end its support for the hockey division. The remaining nine schools simply reformed into a new conference called Atlantic Hockey and continued on without much trouble. Canisius' trouble in the conference tournament continued throughout the decade and saw them win two out of their first ten games. During that streak, however, the Canisius program went through some upheaval. Long-time coach Brian Cavanaugh came under fire for his conduct through complaints from his players. In December 2004 he was fired when players threatened to sit out a game and he was soon replaced by assistant Clancy Seymour. The following season began with yet a third coach, Dave Smith and it took the new bench boss a few years to repair the program.

In 2009–10 Canisius posted its first winning season in nine years and reach the conference semifinal. After a couple of modest seasons the Golden Griffins shocked Atlantic Hockey by winning the 2013 Tournament as a 7th-seed and made its first appearance in the NCAA tournament. The Golden Griffins played well but bowed out in their first game against top-seeded Quinnipiac. Over the next few years Smith pushed the program to better results, culminating in their first conference title in 2017. Smith was hired away by Rensselaer soon after but the Golden Griffins continue to perform well under new coach Trevor Large.

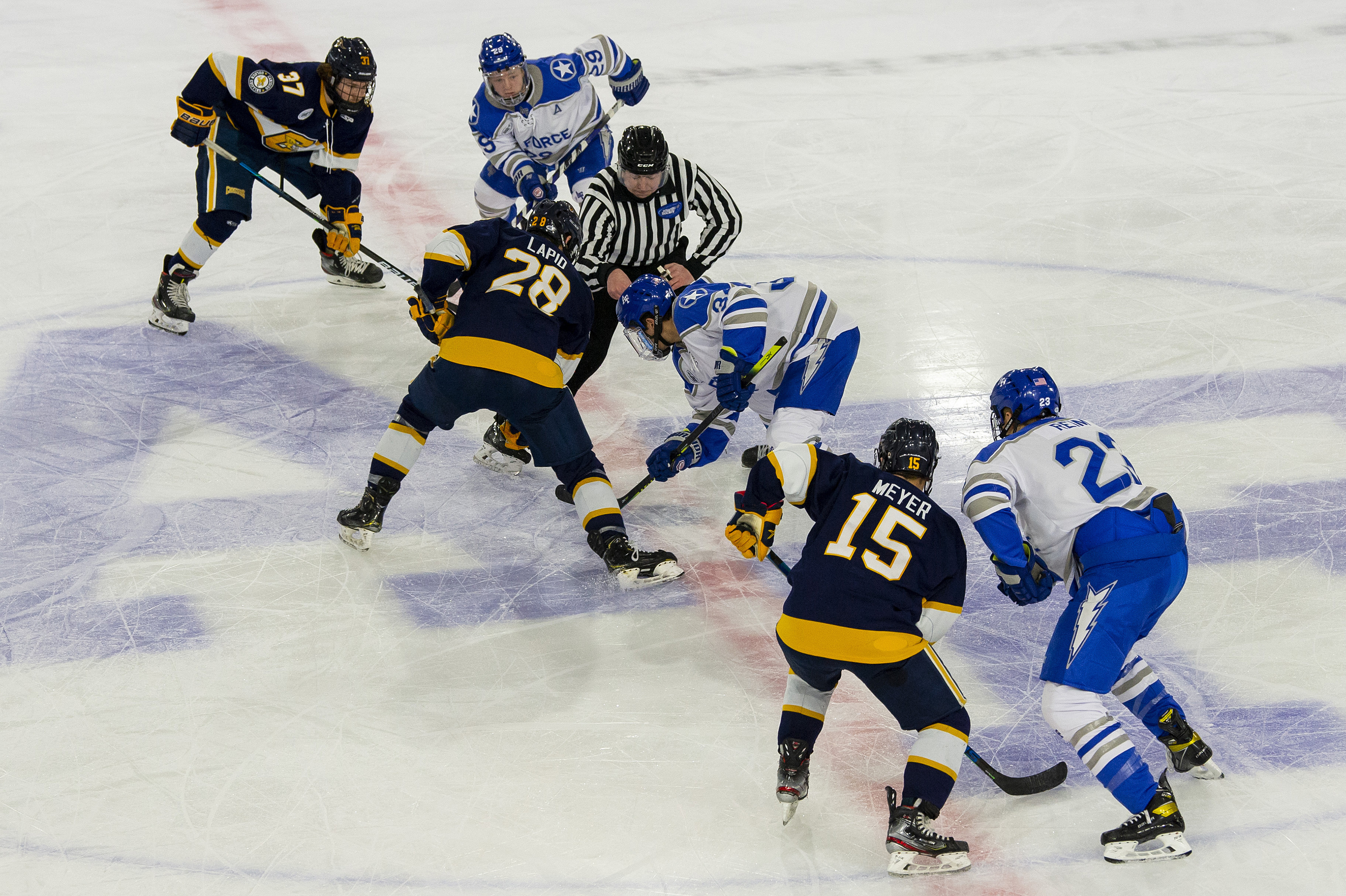
Canisius faces off against Air Force during a game in 2021

The Golden Griffins finished fourth in the 2022–23 Atlantic Hockey division standings. Canisius defeated fifth seeded Army in three games to advance to the conference tournament semifinals, where they defeated sixth seeded Niagara in three games and advanced to their second straight conference championship game, their first as hosts. The Golden Griffins went on to defeat seventh seeded Holy Cross by a score of 3–0 to clinch the program's second appearance in the NCAA tournament. Canisius faced the No. 1 seeded Minnesota Golden Gophers in the opening round of the tournament. Canisius maintained a 2–1 lead early in the second period thanks to goals by forwards Daniel DiGrande and Nick Bowman, before allowing two goals to make the score 3–2 heading into the third period. The Golden Griffins would end up losing to the Golden Gophers by a score of 9–2, finishing the season with a 20–19–3 record.

Shortly after the 2023–24 season, the Atlantic Hockey Association and College Hockey America merged to form Atlantic Hockey America. The predecessor conferences had operated with a single commissioner and shared conference staff since 2010.

== Season-by-season results ==
Source:

== All-time coaching records ==
As of the completion of 2025–26 season

Tenure	Coach	Years	Record	Pct.
1980–1982, 1983–2004‡	Brian Cavanaugh	24‡	342–306–56	.526
1982–1983	Carl Koeppel	1	9–16–1	.365
2004–2005	Clancy Seymour	1†	9–8–3†	.525
2005–2017	Dave Smith	12	172–223–59	.444
2017–Present	Trevor Large	9	129–158–27	.454
Totals	5 Coaches	46 Years	660–712–146	.483

† interim head coach
‡ fired mid-season

== Awards and honors ==
=== NCAA ===
AHCA First Team All-Americans

- 2016-17: Charles Williams, G

=== MAAC ===
==== Individual awards ====
MAAC Goaltender of the Year

- Sean Weaver: 2000

==== All-Conference teams ====
First Team All-MAAC

- 1998–99: Derek Gilham, D
- 1999–00: Sean Weaver, G

Second Team All-MAAC

- 1998–99: David Deeves, F

MAAC All-Rookie Team

- 1998–99:Joel Tarvudd, D; David Deeves, F
- 2002–03: Tim Songin, D

=== Atlantic Hockey ===
==== Individual awards ====
Player of the Year

- Cory Conacher: 2010
- Charles Williams: 2017
- Dylan McLaughlin: 2018

Rookie of the Year

- David Kostuch: 2009
- Matteo Giampa: 2024

Coach of the Year

- Dave Smith: 2017

Best Defensive Forward

- David Kasch: 2008
- Ryan Schmelzer: 2017

Best Defenseman

- Cameron Heath: 2017

Regular Season Scoring Trophy

- Cory Conacher, LW: 2010
- Dylan McLaughlin: 2018

Regular Season Goaltending Award

- Keegan Asmundson: 2015
- Charles Williams: 2017
- Jacob Barczewski: 2021

Individual Sportsmanship Award

- Dylan McLaughlin: 2019

Most Valuable Player in Tournament

- Kyle Gibbons, F: 2013
- Jacob Barczewski, G: 2023

==== All-Conference teams ====
First Team All-Atlantic Hockey

- 2004–05: Bryan Worosz, G
- 2009–10: Cory Conacher, F
- 2014–15: Chris Rumble, D
- 2015–16: Shane Conacher, F
- 2016–17: Charles Williams, F
- 2017–18: Cameron Heath, F; Dylan McLaughlin, F
- 2018–19: Dylan McLaughlin, F
- 2020–21: Jacob Barczewski, G; Keaton Mastrodonato, F
- 2021–22: Jacob Barczewski, G

Second Team All-Atlantic Hockey

- 2009–10: Carl Hudson, D
- 2010–11: Cory Conacher, F
- 2014–15: Keegan Asmundson, G; Ralph Cuddemi, F
- 2015–16: Ralph Cuddemi, F
- 2016–17: Cameron Heath, D; Ryan Schmelzer, F
- 2017–18: Lester Lancaster, D
- 2019–20: Matt Hoover, F; Nick Hutchison, F
- 2021–22: Keaton Mastrodonato, F
- 2023–24: Matteo Giampa, F

Third Team All-Atlantic Hockey

- 2008–09: Carl Hudson, D; Jason Weeks, F
- 2009–10: Vincent Scarcella, F
- 2012–13: Kyle Gibbons, F
- 2015–16: Ben Danforth, D
- 2016–17: Dylan McLaughlin, F
- 2017–18: Ryan Schmelzer, F
- 2019–20: Matt Stief, F
- 2021–22: David Melaragni, F
- 2022–23: Jacob Barczewski, G; Keaton Mastrodonato, F

Atlantic Hockey All-Rookie Team

- 2005–06: Dan Giffin, G
- 2006–07: Josh Heidinger, F
- 2007–08: Vincent Scarsella, F
- 2008–09: David Kostuch, F
- 2016–17: Nick Hutchinson, F
- 2017–18: Grant Meyer, F
- 2023–24: Matteo Giampa, F

=== Atlantic Hockey America ===
==== All-Conference teams ====
Second Team All-Atlantic Hockey America

- 2024–25: Matteo Giampa, F

Third Team All-Atlantic Hockey America

- 2025–26: Grant Porter, F; Walter Zacher, F; Killian Kiecker-Olson, F

All-Atlantic Hockey America Rookie Team

- 2024–25: Dominic Payne, D
- 2025–26: F. J. Buteau, D

== Canisius Hall of Fame ==
The following is a list of Canisius' men's ice hockey players who were elected into the Canisius College Hall of Fame (induction year in parentheses).

- Derrick Bishop (2013)
- Andre Bourgeault (2006)
- Dr. David Dietz (2001)
- Joe Federico (2005)
- Josh Oort (2010)
- Gary Roessler (1998)
- Mike Sisti (2002)
- Kevin Sykes (1999)
- Mike Torrillo (1999)
- Brian Worosz (2016)

== Statistical leaders ==
=== Career points leaders ===
Player	Years	GP	G	A	Pts	PIM
Mike Torillo	1984–1988	117	121	144	265	N/A
Kevin Sykes	1984–1988	104	114	120	234	N/A
Josh Oort	1994–1998	103	67	105	172	49
Mike Sisti	1986–1990	120	74	89	163	156
Gary Roessler	1980–1984	90	68	84	152	N/A
Andre Bourgeault	1992–1996	107	55	93	148	127
Cory Conacher	2007–2011	129	62	85	147	156
Dylan McLaughlin	2015–2019	151	58	89	147	28
Dave Yablecki	1987–1991	115	59	86	145	21
Derrick Bishop	1991–1995	103	46	98	144	114

=== Career goaltending leaders ===
GP = Games played; Min = Minutes played; GA = Goals against; SO = Shutouts; SV% = Save percentage; GAA = Goals against average

Minimum 2000 minutes

Player	Years	GP	Min	W	L	T	GA	SO	SV%	GAA
Charles Williams	2016–2017	34	2009	21	7	5	61	6	.943	1.82
Keegan Asmundson	2012–2015	45	2422	18	15	6	84	3	.930	2.08
Jacob Barczewski	2019–2023	100	5642	44	42	8	245	6	.917	2.61
Tony Capobianco	2010–2014	101	5858	39	47	10	265	8	.920	2.72
Daniel Urbani	2016–2020	42	2433	17	22	3	115	1	.915	2.84

Statistics current through the end of the 2022-23 season.

== Current roster ==
As of August 7, 2024.

No.	Nat.	Player	Class	Pos	Height	Weight	DoB	Hometown	Previous team	NHL rights
4	(Canada)	Brice Cooke	Freshman	F	6' 3" (1.91 m)	190 lb (86 kg)	2004-03-23	Orangeville, Ontario	Toronto Patriots (OJHL)	—
5	(Canada)	Robert Kincaid	Senior	D	6' 2" (1.88 m)	185 lb (84 kg)	2002-05-13	Barrhead, Alberta	Maine (HEA)	—
8	(Canada)	Rhys Chiddenton	Junior	F	6' 0" (1.83 m)	182 lb (83 kg)	2003-05-23	Campbellville, Ontario	Bemidji State (CCHA)	—
9	(United States)	Walter Zacher	Junior	F	5' 11" (1.8 m)	181 lb (82 kg)	2002-04-02	Buffalo, New York	Robert Morris (AHA)	—
12	(Canada)	Kash Rasmussen	Senior	F	6' 2" (1.88 m)	170 lb (77 kg)	2001-04-20	Cochrane, Alberta	Michigan Tech (CCHA)	—
14	(Canada)	Trey Funk	Junior	F	6' 2" (1.88 m)	180 lb (82 kg)	2002-04-11	Redwood Meadows, Alberta	Bonnyville Pontiacs (AJHL)	—
15	(Canada)	Cole Miller	Freshman	F	6' 4" (1.93 m)	190 lb (86 kg)	2005-02-04	Edmonton, Alberta	Edmonton Oil Kings (WHL)	—
20	(Canada)	Ryan Gillespie	Sophomore	F	6' 0" (1.83 m)	190 lb (86 kg)	2003-01-31	Toronto, Ontario	Salmon Arm Silverbacks (BCHL)	—
23	(Canada)	Joseph Messina	Junior	D	5' 9" (1.75 m)	185 lb (84 kg)	2002-02-01	Woodbridge, Ontario	Union (ECAC)	—
24	(United States)	Josh Phillips	Graduate	D	6' 2" (1.88 m)	190 lb (86 kg)	2001-05-24	Getzville, New York	Union (ECAC)	—
26	(Switzerland)	Stefano Bottini	Senior	F	6' 0" (1.83 m)	180 lb (82 kg)	2002-05-03	Lugano, Switzerland	Penticton Vees (BCHL)	—
27	(Canada)	Carter Anderson	Freshman	F	5' 11" (1.8 m)	183 lb (83 kg)	2004-08-01	Thompson, Manitoba	Chilliwack Chiefs (BCHL)	—
30	(Canada)	Ethan Robertson	Junior	G	6' 1" (1.85 m)	175 lb (79 kg)	2002-02-22	Courtice, Ontario	Austin Bruins (NAHL)	—
33	(Sweden)	Petter Wickström Stumer	Sophomore	G	6' 6" (1.98 m)	203 lb (92 kg)	2004-09-03	Stockholm, Sweden	Northeast Generals (NAHL)	—
37	(Canada)	Hunter Andrew	Senior	F	6' 0" (1.83 m)	165 lb (75 kg)	2002-10-25	Virden, Manitoba	Powell River Kings (BCHL)	—
41	(United States)	Chase Clark	Senior	G	6' 6" (1.98 m)	208 lb (94 kg)	2002-04-08	Williamsville, New York	American International (AHA)	WSH, 183rd overall 2021
42	(United States)	Nick Strom	Senior	D	6' 0" (1.83 m)	190 lb (86 kg)	2000-03-21	Dayton, Minnesota	Rensselaer (ECAC)	—
44	(Canada)	Luke Marshall	Sophomore	D	6' 0" (1.83 m)	170 lb (77 kg)	2003-06-20	Fenwick, Ontario	Brooks Bandits (BCHL)	—
47	(United States)	Grant Porter	Senior	F	5' 11" (1.8 m)	180 lb (82 kg)	2002-02-21	Weston, Massachusetts	Providence (HEA)	—
55	(Canada)	Christian MacDougall	Senior	F	6' 0" (1.83 m)	180 lb (82 kg)	2001-03-13	Toronto, Ontario	Coquitlam Express (BCHL)	—
57	(Canada)	Carter Patterson	Sophomore	D	6' 4" (1.93 m)	201 lb (91 kg)	2003-11-13	Burlington, Ontario	Blackfalds Bulldogs (BCHL)	—
61	(Canada)	Hunter Price	Sophomore	F	6' 1" (1.85 m)	194 lb (88 kg)	2003-10-25	Calgary, Alberta	Sherwood Park Crusaders (BCHL)	—
72	(Canada)	Kyan Haldenby	Freshman	F	6' 2" (1.88 m)	190 lb (86 kg)	2005-04-13	Toronto, Ontario	Shreveport Mudbugs (NAHL)	—
73	(Canada)	F. J. Buteau	Freshman	D	6' 4" (1.93 m)	207 lb (94 kg)	2000-07-01	Montréal, Quebec	Acadie-Bathurst Titan (QMJHL)	—
77	(United States)	Jack Pascucci	Senior	D	6' 2" (1.88 m)	195 lb (88 kg)	2002-02-15	North Andover, Massachusetts	Connecticut (HEA)	—
88	(United States)	Killian Kiecker-Olson	Senior	F	6' 1" (1.85 m)	195 lb (88 kg)	2001-01-19	Andover, Minnesota	Maine (HEA)	—
91	(Canada)	Alton McDermott	Graduate	F	5' 10" (1.78 m)	175 lb (79 kg)	2001-06-04	Oakville, Ontario	Oakville Blades (OJHL)	—
92	(Canada)	Oliver Tarr	Senior	F	6' 0" (1.83 m)	185 lb (84 kg)	2002-01-20	Uxbridge, Ontario	Haliburton County Huskies (OJHL)	—
94	(Canada)	David Elmy	Freshman	F	6' 1" (1.85 m)	198 lb (90 kg)	2005-01-29	Mississauga, Ontario	St. Michael's Buzzers (OJHL)	—

== Notable former players ==
Notable alumni include:

- Dylan McLaughlin '19: Signed to an NHL contract by the St. Louis Blues
- Carl Hudson '10: Signed to an NHL contract by the Florida Panthers
- Ryan Stewart '98: Current Senior Advisor for the San Jose Sharks and 3x Stanley Cup champion as Director of Pro Scouting with the Chicago Blackhawks

=== Golden Griffins in the NHL ===
As of July 1, 2025.

Player	Position	Team(s)	Years	Games	Stanley Cups
Cory Conacher	Center	TBL, OTT, BUF, NYI	2012–2020	193	0

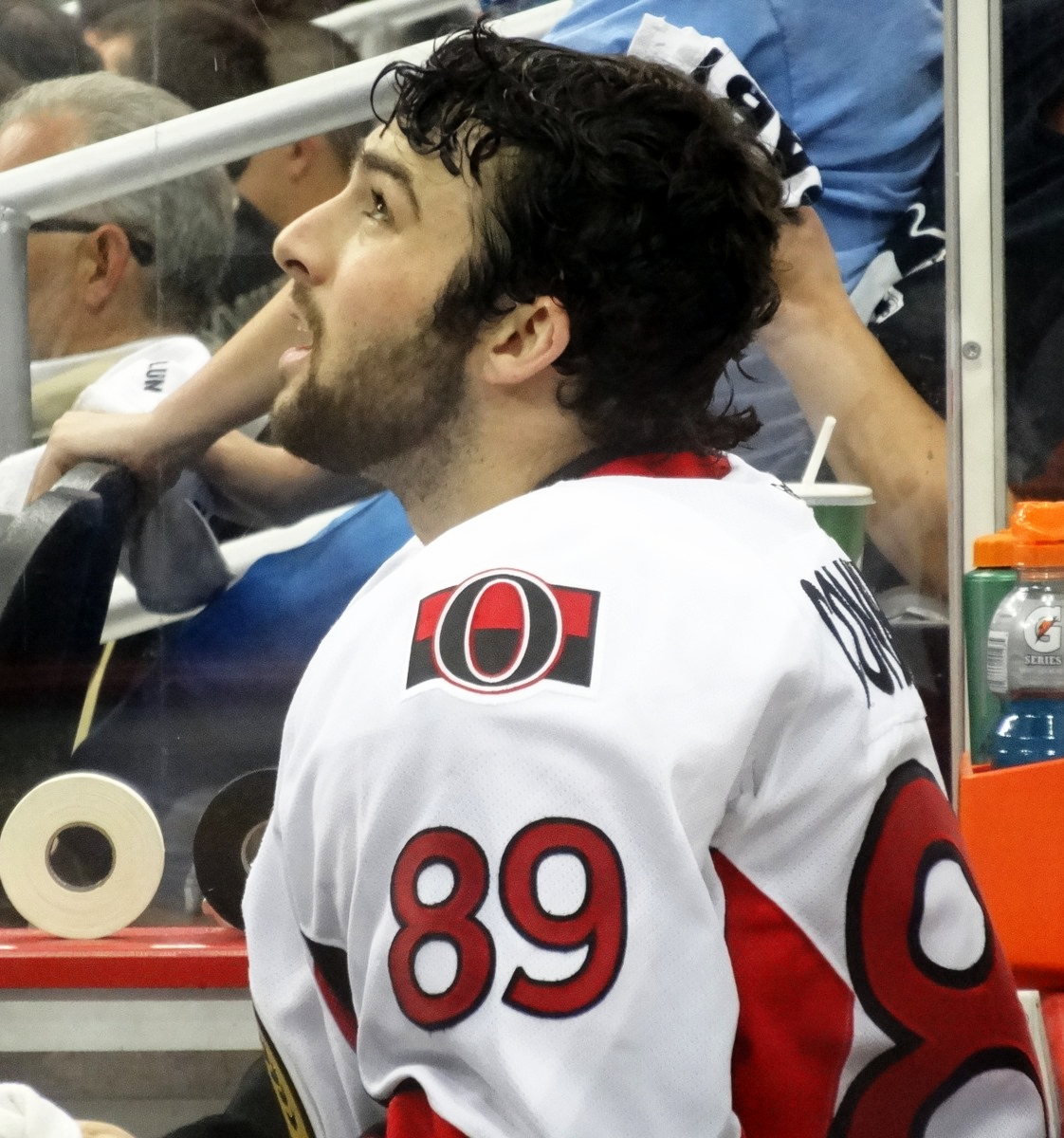
Cory Conacher

== See also ==
- Canisius Golden Griffins
