= Dave Smith (ice hockey) =

Canadian ice hockey player and coach

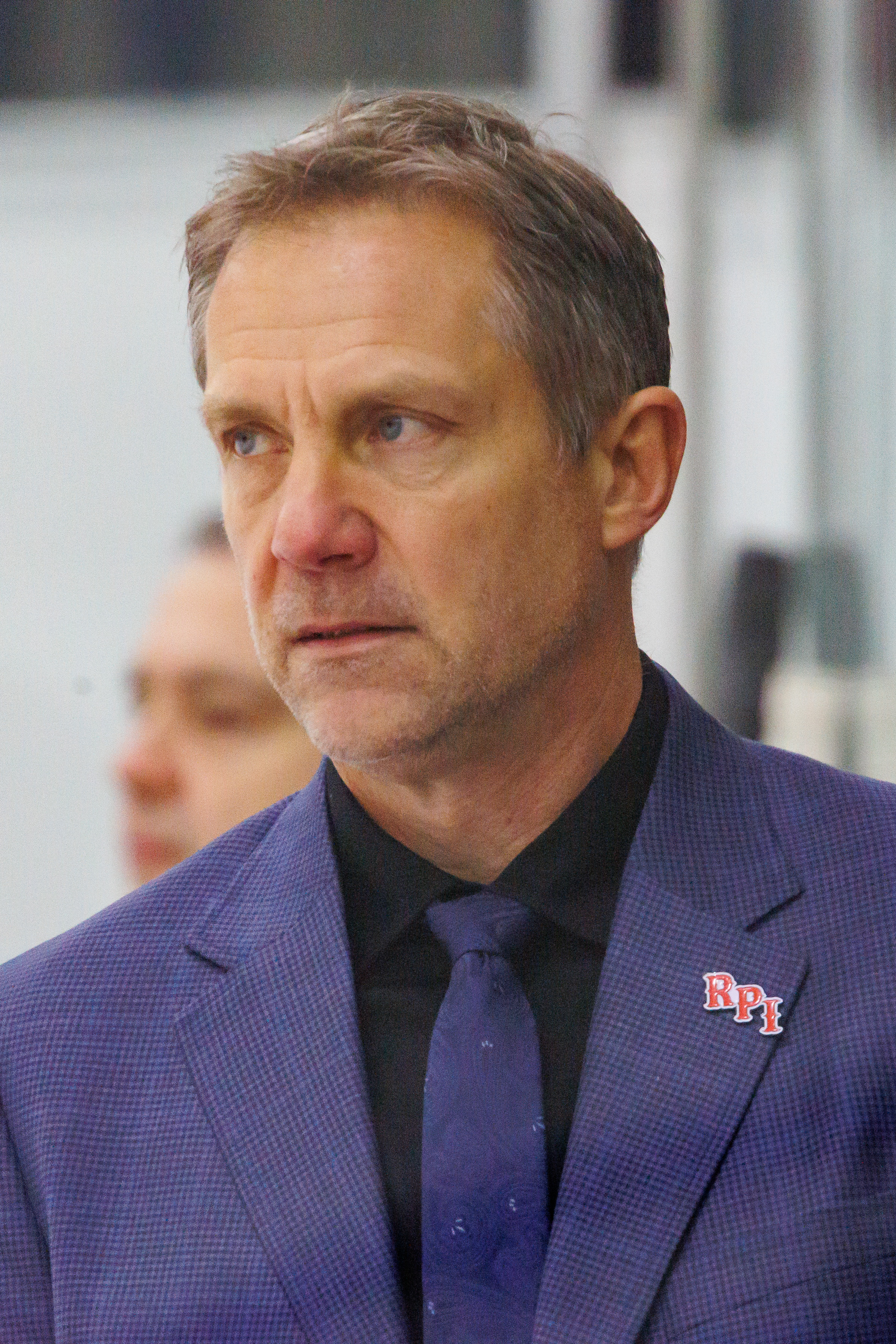
- Born: November 21, 1968 (age 57) Arthur, Ontario, Canada
- Height: 6 ft 0 in (183 cm)
- Weight: 191 lb (87 kg; 13 st 9 lb)
- Position: Centre
- Shot: Left
- Played for: AHL; Binghamton Rangers; ECHL; Dayton Bombers; IHL; Fort Wayne Komets; Detroit Vipers; Los Angeles Ice Dogs; Orlando Solar Bears; San Antonio Dragons
- NHL draft: Undrafted
- Playing career: 1992–1998
- Coaching career

Current position
- Record: 87–152–19 (.374)

Biographical details
- Education: Ohio State University

Playing career
- 1988–1992: Ohio State
- Position: Center

Coaching career (HC unless noted)
- 1998–2000: Miami (assistant)
- 2000–2002: Bowling Green (assistant)
- 2002–2005: Mercyhurst (assistant)
- 2005–2017: Canisius
- 2017–2025: Rensselaer

Head coaching record
- Overall: 259–375–78 (.419)
- Tournaments: 0–1 (.000)

Accomplishments and honors

Championships
- 2013 Atlantic Hockey Tournament; 2017 Atlantic Hockey

David Smith (born November 21, 1968) is a Canadian ice hockey coach and former player. He was the head coach of the NCAA RPI Engineers men's ice hockey team, a position he has held since the 2017–18 season up until March 2025.

Smith was a member of the 1992–93 Turner Cup champions, the Fort Wayne Komets.

== Coaching career ==
In 1998, following a six-year professional minor league career, Smith joined the coaching staff of the Miami RedHawks men's ice hockey team as an assistant. He also served as an assistant coach with Bowling Green State University, and Mercyhurst University, before being hired on April 15, 2005, as the head coach at Canisius College.

== Head coaching record ==
Record table
Season	Team	Overall	Conference	Standing	Postseason
Canisius Golden Griffins (Atlantic Hockey) (2005–2017)
2005–06	Canisius	10–23–2	8–18–2	7th	Atlantic Hockey Quarterfinals
2006–07	Canisius	9–23–3	9–16–3	8th	Atlantic Hockey Play-In
2007–08	Canisius	11–20–6	10–13–5	t-6th	Atlantic Hockey Quarterfinals
2008–09	Canisius	15–16–6	12–12–4	5th	Atlantic Hockey Quarterfinals
2009–10	Canisius	17–15–5	13–11–4	5th	Atlantic Hockey Semifinals
2010–11	Canisius	13–19–6	10–12–5	8th	Atlantic Hockey Quarterfinals
2011–12	Canisius	10–22–4	10–14–4	9th	Atlantic Hockey first round
2012–13	Canisius	19–19–5	12–13–2	t-7th	NCAA East Regional semifinals
2013–14	Canisius	17–21–3	11–13–3	t-7th	Atlantic Hockey runner-up
2014–15	Canisius	18–12–7	15–7–6	2nd	Atlantic Hockey Semifinals
2015–16	Canisius	12–22–5	10–13–5	t-6th	Atlantic Hockey Quarterfinals
2016–17	Canisius	21–11–7	18–4–6	1st	Atlantic Hockey Semifinals
Canisius:		172–223–59 (.444)	138–146–49 (.488)		
Rensselaer Engineers (ECAC Hockey) (2017–2025)
2017–18	Rensselaer	6–27–4	4–16–2	11th	ECAC first round
2018–19	Rensselaer	10–23–3	7–13–2	11th	ECAC first round
2019–20	Rensselaer	17–15–2	13–8–1	4th	Tournament cancelled
2021–22	Rensselaer	18–23–3	10–12–0	6th	ECAC quarterfinals
2022–23	Rensselaer	14–20–1	9–13–0	T–7th	ECAC First Round
2023–24	Rensselaer	10–23–4	6–13–3	12th	ECAC Quarterfinals
2024–25	Rensselaer	12–21–2	7–15–0	10th	ECAC First Round
Rensselaer:		87–152–19 (.374)	56–90–8 (.390)		
Total:		259–375–78 (.419)			
National champion Postseason invitational champion Conference regular season champion Conference regular season and conference tournament champion Division regular season champion Division regular season and conference tournament champion Conference tournament champion

Awards and achievements
Preceded by Frank Serratore	Atlantic Hockey Coach of the Year; 2016–17	Succeeded by Rick Gotkin
