= List of Union Garnet Chargers men's ice hockey seasons =

This is a season-by-season list of records compiled by Union in men's ice hockey. Union College has won one NCAA Championship in its history.

== Season-by-season results ==
Note: GP = Games played, W = Wins, L = Losses, T = Ties

NCAA D-I Champions	NCAA Frozen Four	Conference regular season champions	Conference Division Champions	Conference Playoff Champions

Season	Conference	Regular season (Note: Code explanation; GP—Games Played, W—Wins, L—Losses, T—Tied games, OTW—Overtime Wins, OTL—Overtime Loses, 3/SW—Win in 3 on 3 overtime or shootout, Pts—Points*)														Conference tournament results	National tournament results
Season	Conference	Conference									Overall					Conference tournament results	National tournament results
Season	Conference	GP	W	L	T	OTW	OTL	3/SW	Pts*	Finish	GP	W	L	T	%	Conference tournament results	National tournament results
No coach (1903–1919)
1903–04	Independent	–	–	–	–	–	–	–	–	–	4	2	2	0	.500		
Program suspended
1905–06	Independent	–	–	–	–	–	–	–	–	–	2	0	1	1	.250		
1906–07	Independent	–	–	–	–	–	–	–	–	–	1	1	0	0	1.000		
1907–08	Independent	–	–	–	–	–	–	–	–	–	3	1	2	0	.333		
1908–09	Independent	–	–	–	–	–	–	–	–	–	2	1	1	0	.500		
1909–10	Independent	–	–	–	–	–	–	–	–	–	1	0	1	0	.000		
1910–11	Independent	–	–	–	–	–	–	–	–	–	1	1	0	0	1.000		
Program suspended
Ambrose Clark (1920–1924)
1919–20	Independent	–	–	–	–	–	–	–	–	–	4	2	2	0	.500		
Program suspended
1921–22	Independent	–	–	–	–	–	–	–	–	–	6	2	4	0	.333		
1922–23	Independent	–	–	–	–	–	–	–	–	–	3	2	1	0	.667		
1923–24	Independent	–	–	–	–	–	–	–	–	–	4	1	3	0	.250		
Henry Gardner (1924–1925)
1924–25	Independent	–	–	–	–	–	–	–	–	–	4	1	3	0	.250		
H. A. Larrabee (1925–1930)
1925–26	Independent	–	–	–	–	–	–	–	–	–	5	2	3	0	.400		
1926–27	Independent	–	–	–	–	–	–	–	–	–	5	3	2	0	.600		
1927–28	Independent	–	–	–	–	–	–	–	–	–	5	0	4	1	.100		
1928–29	Independent	–	–	–	–	–	–	–	–	–	5	2	2	1	.500		
1929–30	Independent	–	–	–	–	–	–	–	–	–	6	2	3	1	.417		
William Harkness (1930–1933)
1930–31	Independent	–	–	–	–	–	–	–	–	–	7	2	4	1	.357		
1931–32	Independent	–	–	–	–	–	–	–	–	–	2	0	2	0	.000		
1932–33	Independent	–	–	–	–	–	–	–	–	–	4	2	2	0	.500		
H. L. Achilles (1933–1935)
1933–34	Independent	–	–	–	–	–	–	–	–	–	6	3	3	0	.500		
1934–35	Independent	–	–	–	–	–	–	–	–	–	5	1	4	0	.200		
Arthur C. Lawrence (1935–1936)
1935–36	Independent	–	–	–	–	–	–	–	–	–	8	2	5	1	.313		
Duke Nelson (1936–1939)
1936–37	Independent	–	–	–	–	–	–	–	–	–	6	1	5	0	.167		
1937–38	Independent	–	–	–	–	–	–	–	–	–	4	0	3	1	.125		
1938–39	Independent	–	–	–	–	–	–	–	–	–	5	2	3	0	.400		
Arthur C. Lawrence (1939–1942)
1939–40	Independent	–	–	–	–	–	–	–	–	–	8	5	3	0	.625		
1940–41	Independent	–	–	–	–	–	–	–	–	–	8	2	5	1	.313		
1941–42	Independent	–	–	–	–	–	–	–	–	–	8	0	8	0	.000		
Program suspended due to World War II
Arthur C. Lawrence (1947–1949)
1947–48	Independent	–	–	–	–	–	–	–	–	–	9	1	8	0	.111		
1948–49	Independent	–	–	–	–	–	–	–	–	–	1	0	1	0	.000		
Program suspended
Division II
Ned Harkness (1975–1977)
1975–76	ECAC 2	–	–	–	–	–	–	–	–	2nd	23	19	4	0	.826	Lost Quarterfinal, 2–3 (Army)	
1976–77	ECAC 2	12	11	1	0	–	–	–	.917	1st	26	22	3	1	.865	Won Quarterfinal; Won Semifinal, 11–4 (Army); Lost Championship, 4–6 (Merrimack)	
Bob Driscoll (1978)
1977–78	ECAC 2	8	1	7	0	–	–	–	.125	31st	19†	4†	14†	1†	.237†		
Charles Morrison (1978–1988)
1978–79	ECAC 2	–	–	–	–	–	–	–	–	–	26	5	21	0	.192		
1979–80	ECAC 2	–	–	–	–	–	–	–	–	–	28	12	15	1	.446		
1980–81	ECAC 2	26	6	20	0	–	–	–	.231	–	28	6	21	1	.232		
1981–82	ECAC 2	–	–	–	–	–	–	–	–	–	29	13	15	1	.466		
1982–83	ECAC 2	–	–	–	–	–	–	–	–	–	26	9	15	2	.385		
1983–84	ECAC 2	–	–	–	–	–	–	–	–	–	31	19	11	1	.629	Won West Quarterfinal; Won Semifinal, 5–3 (Oswego State); Lost Championship, 1–3 (RIT)	Won Quarterfinal series, 8–6 (Wisconsin–River Falls); Won Semifinal, 5–4 (4OT) (RIT); Lost Championship, 0–8 (Babson)
Division III
1984–85	ECAC West	–	–	–	–	–	–	–	–	3rd	32	22	9	1	.703	Won Quarterfinal, 3–2 (Elmira); Won Semifinal, 2–1 (OT) (Plattsburgh State); Won Championship, 7–3 (RIT)	Won Quarterfinal series, 7–4 (Babson); Lost Semifinal, 2–3 (RIT); Win Third-place game, 9–6 (Plattsburgh State)
1985–86	ECAC West	–	–	–	–	–	–	–	–	4th	29	15	14	0	.517	Won Quarterfinal, 4–3 (Oswego State); Lost Semifinal, 6–8 (RIT)	Lost Quarterfinal series, 0–2 (RIT)
1986–87	ECAC West	–	–	–	–	–	–	–	–	–	24	9	15	0	.375		
1987–88	ECAC West	–	–	–	–	–	–	–	–	4th	26	13	11	2	.538	Lost Quarterfinal, 4–5 (RIT)	
Bruce Delventhal (1988–1996)
1988–89	ECAC West	–	–	–	–	–	–	–	–	3rd	29	19	8	2	.690	Won Quarterfinal, 6–3 (Canisius); Won Semifinal (Hamilton); Lost Championship, 3–5 (RIT)	Lost Quarterfinal series, 0–1–1 (Babson)
1989–90	ECAC West	–	–	–	–	–	–	–	–	6th	27	16	8	3	.648	Lost Quarterfinal, 4–5 (Mercyhurst)	
1990–91	ECAC West	–	–	–	–	–	–	–	–	6th	26	17	6	3	.712	Lost Quarterfinal, 3–6 (RIT)	
Division I
1991–92	ECAC Hockey	22	2	19	1	–	–	–	5	12th	25	3	21	1	.140		
1992–93	ECAC Hockey	22	3	19	0	–	–	–	6	12th	25	3	22	0	.120		
1993–94	ECAC Hockey	22	10	9	3	–	–	–	23	6th	30	15	11	4	.567	Lost Quarterfinal series, 1–2 (Rensselaer)	
1994–95	ECAC Hockey	22	6	12	4	–	–	–	16	T–10th	29	9	16	4	.379	Lost Preliminary Round, 2–5 (Princeton)	
1995–96	ECAC Hockey	22	4	15	3	–	–	–	11	11th	30	7	19	4	.300		
Stan Moore (1996–1998)
1996–97	ECAC Hockey	22	11	8	3	–	–	–	25	T–5th	34	18	13	3	.574	Lost Quarterfinal series, 0–2 (Rensselaer)	
1997–98	ECAC Hockey	22	4	15	3	–	–	–	11	12th	32	6	22	4	.250		
Kevin Sneddon (1998–2003)
1998–99	ECAC Hockey	22	1	19	2	–	–	–	4	12th	32	3	26	3	.141		
1999–00	ECAC Hockey	21	6	14	1	–	–	–	13	10th	33	8	24	1	.258	Lost First round series, 0–2 (St. Lawrence)	
2000–01	ECAC Hockey	22	8	12	2	–	–	–	18	T–9th	34	12	18	4	.412	Lost First round series, 0–2 (St. Lawrence)	
2001–02	ECAC Hockey	22	8	11	3	–	–	–	19	11th	32	13	13	6	.500		
2002–03	ECAC Hockey	22	10	10	2	–	–	–	22	6th	36	14	18	4	.444	Lost First round series, 0–2 (Rensselaer)	
Nate Leaman (2003–2011)
2003–04	ECAC Hockey	22	8	11	3	–	–	–	19	8th	36	14	17	5	.458	Lost First round series, 0–2 (Clarkson)	
2004–05	ECAC Hockey	22	8	13	1	–	–	–	17	8th	37	13	22	2	.378	Lost First round series, 1–2 (Clarkson)	
2005–06	ECAC Hockey	22	9	9	4	–	–	–	22	T–6th	38	16	16	6	.500	Lost First round series, 0–2 (Yale)	
2006–07	ECAC Hockey	22	7	14	1	–	–	–	15	12th	36	14	19	3	.431	Lost First round series, 0–2 (Quinnipiac)	
2007–08	ECAC Hockey	22	10	7	5	–	–	–	25	T–4th	35	15	14	6	.514	Lost Quarterfinal series, 0–2 (Cornell)	
2008–09	ECAC Hockey	22	9	11	2	–	–	–	20	T–8th	39	19	17	3	.526	Won First round series, 2–0 (Clarkson); Lost Quarterfinal series, 1–2 (Princeton)	
2009–10	ECAC Hockey	22	12	6	4	–	–	–	28	3rd	39	21	12	6	.615	Won Quarterfinal series, 2–1 (Quinnipiac); Won Semifinal, 3–1 (St. Lawrence); Lost Championship, 0–3 (Cornell)	
2010–11	ECAC Hockey	22	17	3	2	–	–	–	36	1st	40	26	10	4	.700	Lost Quarterfinal series, 1–2 (Colgate)	Lost Regional semifinal, 0–2 (Minnesota–Duluth)
Rick Bennett (2011–2022)
2011–12	ECAC Hockey	22	14	4	4	–	–	–	32	1st	41	26	8	7	.720	Won Quarterfinal series, 2–0 (Rensselaer); Won Semifinal, 6–2 (Colgate); Won Championship 3–1 (Harvard)	Won Regional semifinal, 3–1 (Michigan State); Won Regional final, 4–2 (Massachusetts–Lowell); Lost National semifinal, 1–3 (Ferris State)
2012–13	ECAC Hockey	22	10	8	4	–	–	–	24	4th	40	22	13	5	.613	Won Quarterfinal series, 2–0 (Dartmouth); Won Semifinal, 5–0 (Yale); Won Championship 3–1 (Brown)	Won Regional semifinal, 5–1 (Boston College); Lost Regional final, 1–5 (Quinnipiac)
2013–14	ECAC Hockey	22	18	3	1	–	–	–	37	1st	42	32	6	4	.810	Won Quarterfinal series, 2–0 (Dartmouth); Won Semifinal, 5–2 (Cornell); Won Championship 5–2 (Colgate)	Won Regional semifinal, 5–2 (Vermont); Won Regional final, 3–1 (Providence); Won National semifinal, 5–4 (Boston College); Won National Championship, 7–4 (Minnesota)
2014–15	ECAC Hockey	22	8	13	1	–	–	–	17	10th	39	19	18	2	.513	Won First round series, 2–0 (Cornell); Lost Quarterfinal series, 1–2 (Quinnipiac)	
2015–16	ECAC Hockey	22	6	10	6	–	–	–	18	9th	36	13	14	9	.486	Lost First round series, 0–2 (Cornell)	
2016–17	ECAC Hockey	22	16	4	2	–	–	–	34	T–1st	38	25	10	3	.697	Won Quarterfinal series, 2–0 (Princeton); Lost Semifinal, 1–4 (Cornell)	Lost Regional semifinal, 3–10 (Penn State)
2017–18	ECAC Hockey	22	16	5	1	–	–	–	33	2nd	38	21	15	2	.579	Lost Quarterfinal series, 0–2 (Princeton)	
2018–19	ECAC Hockey	22	10	10	2	–	–	–	22	7th	39	20	13	6	.590	Won First round series, 2–0 (Colgate); Lost Quarterfinal series, 1–2 (Cornell)	
2019–20	ECAC Hockey	22	5	15	2	–	–	–	12	10th	37	8	25	4	.270	Lost First round series, 1–2 (Yale)	
2020–21	ECAC Hockey	Season Cancelled															
John Ronan (2022)
2021–22	ECAC Hockey	22	9	11	2	3	1	0	27	7th	37‡	14‡	19‡	4‡	.432	Won First round series, 2–0 (Princeton); Lost Quarterfinal series, 0–2 (Clarkson)	
Josh Hauge (2022–Present)
2022–23	ECAC Hockey	22	8	13	1	0	0	1	26	T–7th	35	14	19	2	.429	Lost First round, 4–6 (Princeton)	
2023–24	ECAC Hockey	22	9	10	3	1	1	2	32	6th	37	16	18	3	.473	Won First round, 6–0 (Brown); Lost Quarterfinal series, 0–2 (Dartmouth)	
2024–25	ECAC Hockey	22	12	8	2	0	0	2	40	4th	36	19	14	3	.569	Lost Quarterfinal series, 0–2 (Dartmouth)	
Totals											GP	W	L	T	%	Championships	
Regular season											1619	708	758	153	.485	1 ECAC 2 Championship, 4 ECAC Hockey Championships	
Conference post-season											96	43	53	0	.448	1 ECAC West tournament championship, 3 ECAC Hockey tournament championships	
NCAA post-season											23	11	11	1	.500	4 NCAA D-III Tournament appearances, 5 NCAA D-I Tournament appearances	
Regular season and post-season record											1718	762	822	154	.483	1 National Championship	

* Winning percentage is used when conference schedules are unbalanced.
† Ned Harkness resigned in December 1977 after an argument with NESCAC and Union College officials about player recruitment. The entire varsity team refused to play without Harkness so interim head coach Bob Driscoll was forced to coach the final 13 games junior varsity players. Union lost all games with Driscoll behind the bench.
‡ Rick Bennett was suspended on January 19, 2022 and later resigned.
