= 2022–23 Union Dutchmen ice hockey season =

- Conference: T–7th ECAC Hockey
- Home ice: Achilles Center

Rankings
- USCHO: NR
- USA Today: NR

Record
- Overall: 14–19–2
- Conference: 8–13–1
- Home: 11–6–0
- Road: 2–13–1
- Neutral: 1–0–0

Coaches and captains
- Head coach: Josh Hauge
- Assistant coaches: John Ronan; Lennie Childs; Bryan McDonald

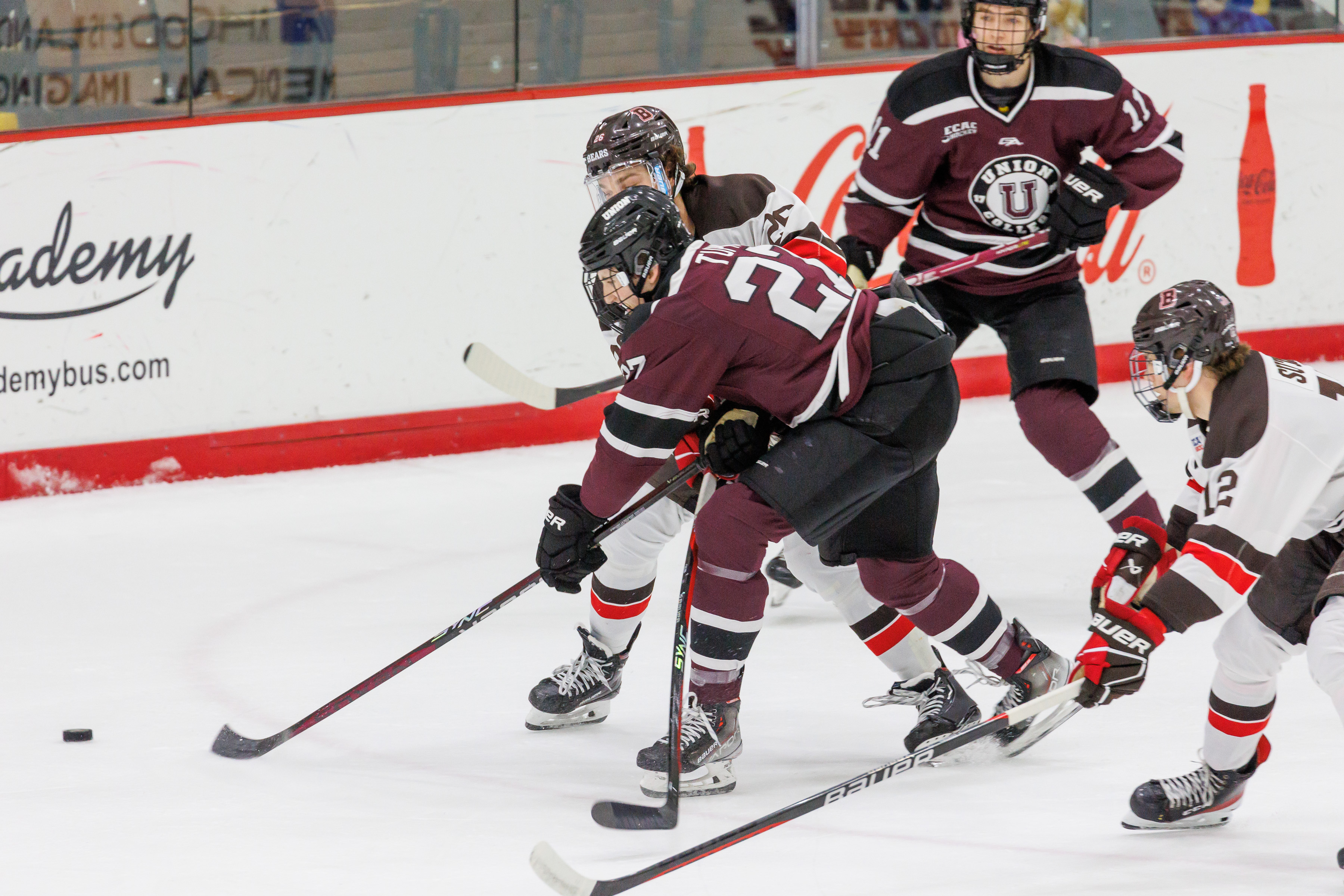
Union Dutchmen at Brown Bears, 13 January

The 2022–23 Union Dutchmen ice hockey season was the 82nd season of play for the program and the 31st in the ECAC Hockey conference. The Dutchmen represented Union College, played their home games at Achilles Center and were coached by Josh Hauge, in his first season.

== Season ==
After John Ronan finished the previous years as interim head coach due to the resignation of Rick Bennett, Union began a search for a permanent replacement. In mid-April, the team chose former Clarkson assistant Josh Hauge as the 22nd head coach in program history. John Ronan returned to his former post as an assistant while the rest of the staff was filled by new entries.

With a new coach came a new philosophy for the team and nearly half the roster changed in the offseason. While the Dutchmen retained their starting goaltender, the top 4 scorer all moved on. Several of the new faces filled in among the scoring leaders for the team but none were particularly outstanding. The result was that Union's offense was about as effective as it had been the year before; average. On defense, the team did well, allowing just over 30 shots per game, which was much better than they had the year before. Unfortunately, Connor Murphy was inconsistent throughout the year and the Dutchmen had a difficult time stringing wins together. Union's biggest problem was their performance on the road. The Dutchmen won just 2 out of 16 away games and more often than not had some lackluster results, including a 1–10 loss to Cornell.

Union finished the regular season in the bottom half of the ECAC standings but still managed to earn a home site for the first round of the postseason. The team faced a wounded Princeton squad and had a good opportunity to advance by scoring 4 times. Unfortunately, Murphy allowed 6 goals on just 27 shots and the Dutchmen's season ended with a thud.

== Departures ==
Player	Position	Nationality	Cause
Dylan Anhorn	Defenseman	Canada	Transferred to St. Cloud State
Alex Cohen	Forward	United States	Signed professional contract (Birmingham Bulls)
Brandon Estes	Defenseman	United States	Graduation (signed with Tucson Roadrunners)
Fletcher Fineman	Defenseman	United States	Graduation (retired)
Collin Graf	Forward	United States	Transferred to (Quinnipiac)
Josh Kosack	Forward	Canada	Graduation (retired)
Gleb Murtazin	Forward	Russia	Left program (retired)
Garrett Nieto	Goaltender	United States	Left program (retired)
Josh Phillips	Defenseman	United States	Left program (retired)
Merek Pipes	Goaltender	Canada	Left program (retired)
Michael Ryan	Defenseman	United States	Graduation (retired)
Gabriel Seger	Forward	Sweden	Transferred to Cornell
Ryan Sidorski	Defenseman	United States	Graduate transfer to North Dakota

== Recruiting ==
Player	Position	Nationality	Age	Notes
Ethan Benz	Forward	United States	21	Shakopee, MN
Kyle Chauvette	Goaltender	United States	20	Goffstown, NH
Nate Hanley	Forward	Canada	20	Rocky Point, NY
Greg Japchen	Defenseman	United States	20	Doylestown, PA
Carter Korpi	Forward	United States	21	South Lyon, MI
Colby MacArthur	Forward	Canada	20	Summerside, PEI
Cal Mell	Defenseman	United States	21	Cumming, GA
Josh Nixon	Forward	Canada	22	Mississauga, ON; transfer from Lake Superior State
John Prokop	Forward/Defenseman	United States	21	Wausau, WI
Mason Snell	Defenseman	Canada	22	Clarington, ON; transfer from Penn State
Chris Théodore	Forward	Canada	24	Beaconsfield, QC; graduate transfer from American International
Benjamin Tupker	Forward	Canada	22	Collingwood, ON; transfer from Cornell
Nick Young	Defenseman	United States	21	Raleigh, NC

== Roster ==
As of August 4, 2022.

No.	Nat.	Player	Class	Pos	Height	Weight	DoB	Hometown	Previous team	NHL rights
2	(United States)	Greg Japchen	Freshman	D	6' 4" (1.93 m)	205 lb (93 kg)	2001-12-17	Doylestown, Pennsylvania	North Iowa Bulls (NAHL)	—
3	(United States)	Cal Mell	Freshman	D	5' 11" (1.8 m)	180 lb (82 kg)	2011-01-30	Alpharetta, Georgia	Janesville Jets (NAHL)	—
4	(United States)	Josh Phillips	Sophomore	D	6' 2" (1.88 m)	190 lb (86 kg)	2001-05-24	Getzville, New York	Minnesota Wilderness (NAHL)	—
5	(United States)	Nic Petruolo	Junior	D	6' 2" (1.88 m)	195 lb (88 kg)	2000-01-29	Neshanic Station, New Jersey	Green Bay Gamblers (USHL)	—
6	(Canada)	Cullen Ferguson	Sophomore	D	6' 0" (1.83 m)	185 lb (84 kg)	2001-02-16	Binbrook, Ontario	Aberdeen Wings (NAHL)	—
7	(United States)	Nick Young	Freshman	D	6' 3" (1.91 m)	215 lb (98 kg)	2001-09-12	Raleigh, North Carolina	St. Cloud Norsemen (NAHL)	—
8	(United States)	Chaz Smedsrud	Junior	F	6' 2" (1.88 m)	195 lb (88 kg)	1998-06-04	Luverne, Minnesota	Madison Capitols (USHL)	—
9	(United States)	Thomas Richter	Sophomore	F	6' 1" (1.85 m)	175 lb (79 kg)	2000-06-06	Greenwich, Connecticut	Penticton Vees (BCHL)	—
10	(Canada)	Chris Théodore	Senior	F	5' 7" (1.7 m)	180 lb (82 kg)	1997-10-15	Beaconsfield, Quebec	American International (AHA)	—
11	(Canada)	Colby MacArthur	Freshman	F	6' 3" (1.91 m)	195 lb (88 kg)	2001-11-02	Summerside, Prince Edward Island	Summerside Western Capitals (MHL)	—
12	(United States)	Carter Korpi	Freshman	F	6' 0" (1.83 m)	185 lb (84 kg)	2001-07-28	South Lyon, Michigan	Wichita Falls Warriors (NAHL)	—
13	(United States)	Tyler Watkins	Junior	F	5' 9" (1.75 m)	175 lb (79 kg)	1999-12-19	Hermantown, Minnesota	Minnesota Wilderness (NAHL)	—
14	(United States)	Andrew Seaman	Sophomore	F	5' 10" (1.78 m)	170 lb (77 kg)	2000-04-21	Winnetka, Illinois	Prince George Spruce Kings (BCHL)	—
15	(Canada)	Josh Nixon	Sophomore	F	5' 9" (1.75 m)	175 lb (79 kg)	2000-05-09	Mississauga, Ontario	Lake Superior State (CCHA)	—
16	(United States)	Christian Sanda	Senior	F	6' 0" (1.83 m)	185 lb (84 kg)	1998-03-13	Vadnais Heights, Minnesota	Coquitlam Express (BCHL)	—
17	(United States)	Matt Allen	Senior	F	6' 2" (1.88 m)	185 lb (84 kg)	1999-03-14	Smithfield, Rhode Island	Boston Junior Bruins (NCDC)	—
18	(Finland)	Ville Immonen	Junior	F	6' 2" (1.88 m)	205 lb (93 kg)	1999-06-18	Seinäjoki, Finland	Minot Minotauros (NAHL)	—
19	(Canada)	Liam Robertson	Junior	F	6' 2" (1.88 m)	170 lb (77 kg)	2000-05-14	Courtice, Ontario	Youngstown Phantoms (USHL)	—
20	(Canada)	Mason Snell	Junior	D	6' 0" (1.83 m)	195 lb (88 kg)	2000-06-18	Courtice, Ontario	Penn State (Big Ten)	—
21	(United States)	John Prokop	Freshman	D	6' 3" (1.91 m)	185 lb (84 kg)	2001-05-13	Wausau, Wisconsin	Des Moines Buccaneers (USHL)	—
22	(United States)	Bram Scheerer	Junior	F	6' 3" (1.91 m)	205 lb (93 kg)	1999-06-03	Edina, Minnesota	Minnesota Wilderness (NAHL)	—
23	(United States)	Trevor Adams	Junior	F	5' 9" (1.75 m)	165 lb (75 kg)	1999-08-19	Muskegon, Michigan	Chilliwack Chiefs (BCHL)	—
24	(United States)	Nate Hanley	Freshman	F	5' 11" (1.8 m)	185 lb (84 kg)	2002-05-30	Rocky Point, New York	Cedar Rapids RoughRiders (USHL)	—
25	(United States)	Owen Farris	Senior	F	6' 3" (1.91 m)	212 lb (96 kg)	2000-06-08	Dallas, Texas	Muskegon Lumberjacks (USHL)	—
26	(Canada)	Nathan Kelly	Junior	D	6' 0" (1.83 m)	185 lb (84 kg)	2000-11-22	South Delta, British Columbia	Chilliwack Chiefs (BCHL)	—
27	(Canada)	Ben Tupker	Senior	F	6' 3" (1.91 m)	215 lb (98 kg)	1999-12-23	Collingwood, Ontario	Cornell (ECAC)	—
28	(United States)	Caden Villegas	Sophomore	F	5' 8" (1.73 m)	165 lb (75 kg)	2001-02-19	Plano, Texas	Tri-City Storm (USHL)	—
29	(Canada)	Michael Hodge	Sophomore	F	5' 8" (1.73 m)	157 lb (71 kg)	2000-05-30	Calgary, Alberta	Fort McMurray Oil Barons (AJHL)	—
31	(United States)	Connor Murphy	Senior	G	6' 4" (1.93 m)	200 lb (91 kg)	1998-09-01	Hudson Falls, New York	Northeastern (HEA)	—
32	(United States)	Ethan Benz	Freshman	F	6' 1" (1.85 m)	190 lb (86 kg)	2001-03-29	Shakopee, Minnesota	St. Cloud Norsemen (NAHL)	—
33	(Canada)	Merek Pipes	Senior	G	5' 11" (1.8 m)	170 lb (77 kg)	1998-11-12	Cobble Hill, British Columbia	Swan Valley Stampeders (MJHL)	—
35	(United States)	Joe Sharib	Sophomore	G	5' 11" (1.8 m)	165 lb (75 kg)	2001-08-16	Natick, Massachusetts	Connecticut Jr. Rangers (NCDC)	—
36	(United States)	Kyle Chauvette	Freshman	G	6' 1" (1.85 m)	170 lb (77 kg)	2001-10-05	Goffstown, New Hampshire	Youngstown Phantoms (USHL)	—

== Standings ==
2022–23 ECAC Hockey Standings
	Conference record										Overall record					
	GP	W	L	T	OTW	OTL	SW	PTS	GF	GA	GP	W	L	T	GF	GA
#1 Quinnipiac †	22	20	2	0	0	0	0	60	87	30	41	34	4	3	162	64
#10 Harvard	22	18	4	0	5	0	0	49	86	48	34	24	8	2	125	81
#9 Cornell	22	15	6	1	0	1	0	47	78	42	34	21	11	2	112	66
St. Lawrence	22	12	10	0	1	2	0	37	56	58	36	17	19	0	88	102
#18 Colgate *	22	11	8	3	4	1	3	36	71	58	40	19	16	5	113	109
Clarkson	22	9	10	3	0	1	0	31	60	60	37	16	17	4	102	98
Rensselaer	22	9	13	0	2	1	0	26	52	74	35	14	20	1	84	115
Union	22	8	13	1	0	0	1	26	45	68	35	14	19	2	86	117
Princeton	22	8	14	0	2	1	0	26	57	73	32	13	19	0	89	112
Yale	22	6	14	2	0	1	1	22	35	62	32	8	20	4	57	94
Brown	22	5	14	3	0	1	1	20	41	69	30	9	18	3	65	91
Dartmouth	22	4	17	1	0	2	1	16	44	70	30	5	24	1	64	106
Championship: March 18, 2023 † indicates conference regular season champion (Cleary Cup) * indicates conference tournament champion (Whitelaw Cup); Rankings: USCHO.com Top 20 Poll

== Schedule and results ==
Date	Time	Opponent^{#}	Rank^{#}	Site	TV	Decision	Result	Attendance	Record
Regular Season
October 1	7:00 PM	RIT*		Achilles Rink • Schenectady, New York	ESPN+	Murphy	W 4–3	2,401	1–0–0
October 2	4:00 PM	at Army*		Tate Rink • West Point, New York	FloHockey	Murphy	T 2–2 ^{OT}	1,463	1–0–1
October 7	7:05 PM	at #20 Connecticut*		XL Center • Hartford, Connecticut	ESPN+	Murphy	L 1–4	2,584	1–1–1
October 8	4:05 PM	at #20 Connecticut*		XL Center • Hartford, Connecticut	ESPN+	Chauvette	L 3–4 ^{OT}	2,442	1–2–1
October 13	7:00 PM	Bentley*		Achilles Rink • Schenectady, New York	ESPN+	Murphy	W 5–1	1,455	2–2–1
October 15	7:00 PM	at RIT*		Blue Cross Arena • Rochester, New York	FloHockey	Chauvette	L 5–8	8,766	2–3–1
October 21	7:00 PM	at #6 Massachusetts*		Mullins Center • Amherst, Massachusetts	ESPN+	Murphy	L 1–7	3,721	2–4–1
October 22	7:00 PM	at #6 Massachusetts*		Mullins Center • Amherst, Massachusetts	ESPN+	Murphy	L 0–7	3,737	2–5–1
October 28	7:00 PM	at Rensselaer		Houston Field House • Troy, New York (Rivalry)	ESPN+	Murphy	L 1–2	4,700	2–6–1 (0–1–0)
October 29	7:00 PM	Rensselaer		Achilles Rink • Schenectady, New York (Rivalry)	ESPN+	Murphy	W 6–0	2,115	3–6–1 (1–1–0)
November 4	7:00 PM	at Clarkson		Cheel Arena • Potsdam, New York	ESPN+	Murphy	W 3–2	2,246	4–6–1 (2–1–0)
November 5	7:00 PM	at St. Lawrence		Appleton Arena • Canton, New York	ESPN+	Murphy	L 2–4	1,886	4–7–1 (2–2–0)
November 11	7:00 PM	at Dartmouth		Achilles Rink • Schenectady, New York	ESPN+	Murphy	W 4–1	1,676	5–7–1 (3–2–0)
November 12	7:00 PM	at #13 Harvard		Achilles Rink • Schenectady, New York	ESPN+	Murphy	L 1–5	1,793	5–8–1 (3–3–0)
December 3	7:00 PM	#18 Northeastern*		Achilles Rink • Schenectady, New York	ESPN+	Murphy	W 3–2	1,621	6–8–1
December 9	7:00 PM	at Princeton		Hobey Baker Memorial Rink • Princeton, New Jersey	ESPN+	Murphy	L 0–2	1,090	6–9–1 (3–4–0)
December 10	7:00 PM	at #2 Quinnipiac		M&T Bank Arena • Hamden, Connecticut	ESPN+	Murphy	L 1–8	2,877	6–10–1 (3–5–0)
December 30	4:00 PM	New Hampshire*		Achilles Rink • Schenectady, New York	ESPN+	Murphy	W 4–3	1,530	7–10–1
December 30	4:00 PM	New Hampshire*		Achilles Rink • Schenectady, New York	ESPN+	Chauvette	W 3–2	1,352	8–10–1
January 6	7:00 PM	#18 Cornell		Achilles Rink • Schenectady, New York	ESPN+	Murphy	L 1–6	2,185	8–11–1 (3–6–0)
January 7	7:00 PM	Colgate		Achilles Rink • Schenectady, New York	ESPN+	Murphy	L 1–2	1,904	8–12–1 (3–7–0)
January 13	7:00 PM	at Brown		Meehan Auditorium • Providence, Rhode Island	ESPN+	Murphy	L 2–6	1,177	8–13–1 (3–8–0)
January 14	7:00 PM	at Yale		Ingalls Rink • New Haven, Connecticut	ESPN+	Chauvette	T 0–0 ^{SOW}	1,700	8–13–2 (3–8–1)
January 20	7:00 PM	St. Lawrence		Achilles Rink • Schenectady, New York	ESPN+	Chauvette	W 3–2	1,564	9–13–2 (4–8–1)
January 21	7:00 PM	Clarkson		Achilles Rink • Schenectady, New York	ESPN+	Murphy	L 3–4	2,245	9–14–2 (4–9–1)
January 28	6:00 PM	vs. Rensselaer*		MVP Arena • Albany, New York (Mayor's Cup)		Murphy	W 6–0	5,883	10–14–2
February 3	7:00 PM	at Colgate		Class of 1965 Arena • Hamilton, New York	ESPN+	Murphy	W 3–1	831	11–14–2 (5–9–1)
February 4	7:00 PM	at #11 Cornell		Lynah Rink • Ithaca, New York	ESPN+	Murphy	L 1–10	3,903	11–15–2 (5–10–1)
February 10	7:00 PM	Yale		Achilles Rink • Schenectady, New York	ESPN+	Murphy	W 3–1	1,795	12–15–2 (6–10–1)
February 11	7:00 PM	Brown		Achilles Rink • Schenectady, New York	ESPN+	Murphy	W 3–1	2,011	13–15–2 (7–10–1)
February 17	7:00 PM	at #9 Harvard		Bright-Landry Hockey Center • Boston, Massachusetts	ESPN+	Murphy	L 3–5	2,172	13–16–2 (7–11–1)
February 18	5:00 PM	at Dartmouth		Thompson Arena • Hanover, New Hampshire	ESPN+	Murphy	L 0–1	1,837	13–17–2 (7–12–1)
February 24	7:00 PM	#2 Quinnipiac		Achilles Rink • Schenectady, New York	ESPN+	Murphy	L 1–4	1,685	13–18–2 (7–13–1)
February 25	7:00 PM	Princeton		Achilles Rink • Schenectady, New York	ESPN+	Murphy	W 3–1	1,902	14–18–2 (8–13–1)
ECAC Hockey Tournament
March 4	4:00 PM	Princeton*		Achilles Rink • Schenectady, New York (First Round)	ESPN+	Murphy	L 4–6	2,119	14–19–2
*Non-conference game. ^{#}Rankings from USCHO.com Poll. All times are in Eastern Time. Source:

== Scoring statistics ==
Name	Position	Games	Goals	Assists	Points	PIM
John Prokop	D/F	35	4	19	23	20
Nate Hanley	C	35	5	16	21	2
Tyler Watkins	F	35	9	10	19	10
Josh Nixon	RW	34	11	5	16	45
Cal Mell	D	34	3	12	15	8
Chaz Smedsrud	LW	34	4	10	14	8
Liam Robertson	C	35	9	4	13	52
Caden Villegas	F	34	7	6	13	4
Chris Theodore	LW	34	3	10	13	10
Owen Farris	F	33	7	4	11	35
Carter Korpi	F	31	6	4	10	14
Mason Snell	D	31	3	6	9	16
Nick Young	D	34	2	7	9	43
Ben Tupker	LW	34	6	1	7	20
Cullen Ferguson	D	34	2	5	7	34
Nicolas Petruolo	D	28	0	7	7	20
Ville Immonen	C	26	3	2	5	8
Bram Scheerer	LW	12	1	2	3	10
Nathan Kelly	D	22	0	3	3	0
Ethan Benz	F	18	0	3	3	4
Matt Allen	D	11	0	2	2	6
Colby MacArthur	RW	11	0	2	2	0
Michael Hodge	F	2	1	0	1	0
Andrew Seaman	F	1	0	0	0	0
Thomas Richter	F	1	0	0	0	0
Merek Pipes	G	2	0	0	0	0
Greg Japchen	D	8	0	0	0	4
Kyle Chauvette	G	10	0	0	0	0
Christian Sanda	F	12	0	0	0	4
Connor Murphy	G	31	0	0	0	0
Total			86	140	226	392

== Goaltending statistics ==
Name	Games	Minutes	Wins	Losses	Ties	Goals against	Saves	Shut outs	SV %	GAA
Merek Pipes	2	00:39	0	0	0	0	1	0	1.000	0.00
Kyle Chauvette	10	417:44	2	2	1	20	202	1	.910	2.87
Connor Murphy	31	1673:03	12	17	1	93	736	2	.888	3.34
Empty Net	-	20:23	-	-	-	4	-	-	-	-
Total	35	2111:49	14	19	2	117	939	3	.889	3.32

== Rankings ==
Poll	Week																											
Poll	Pre	1	2	3	4	5	6	7	8	9	10	11	12	13	14	15	16	17	18	19	20	21	22	23	24	25	26	27 (Final)
USCHO.com	NR	-	NR	NR	NR	NR	NR	NR	NR	NR	NR	NR	NR	-	NR	NR	NR	NR	NR	NR	NR	NR	NR	NR	NR	NR	-	NR
USA Today	NR	NR	NR	NR	NR	NR	NR	NR	NR	NR	NR	NR	NR	NR	NR	NR	NR	NR	NR	NR	NR	NR	NR	NR	NR	NR	NR	NR

Note: USCHO did not release a poll in weeks 1, 13, or 26.

== Awards and honors ==
Player	Award	Ref
John Prokop	ECAC Hockey Rookie Team	
