= 2023–24 Union Garnet Chargers men's ice hockey season =

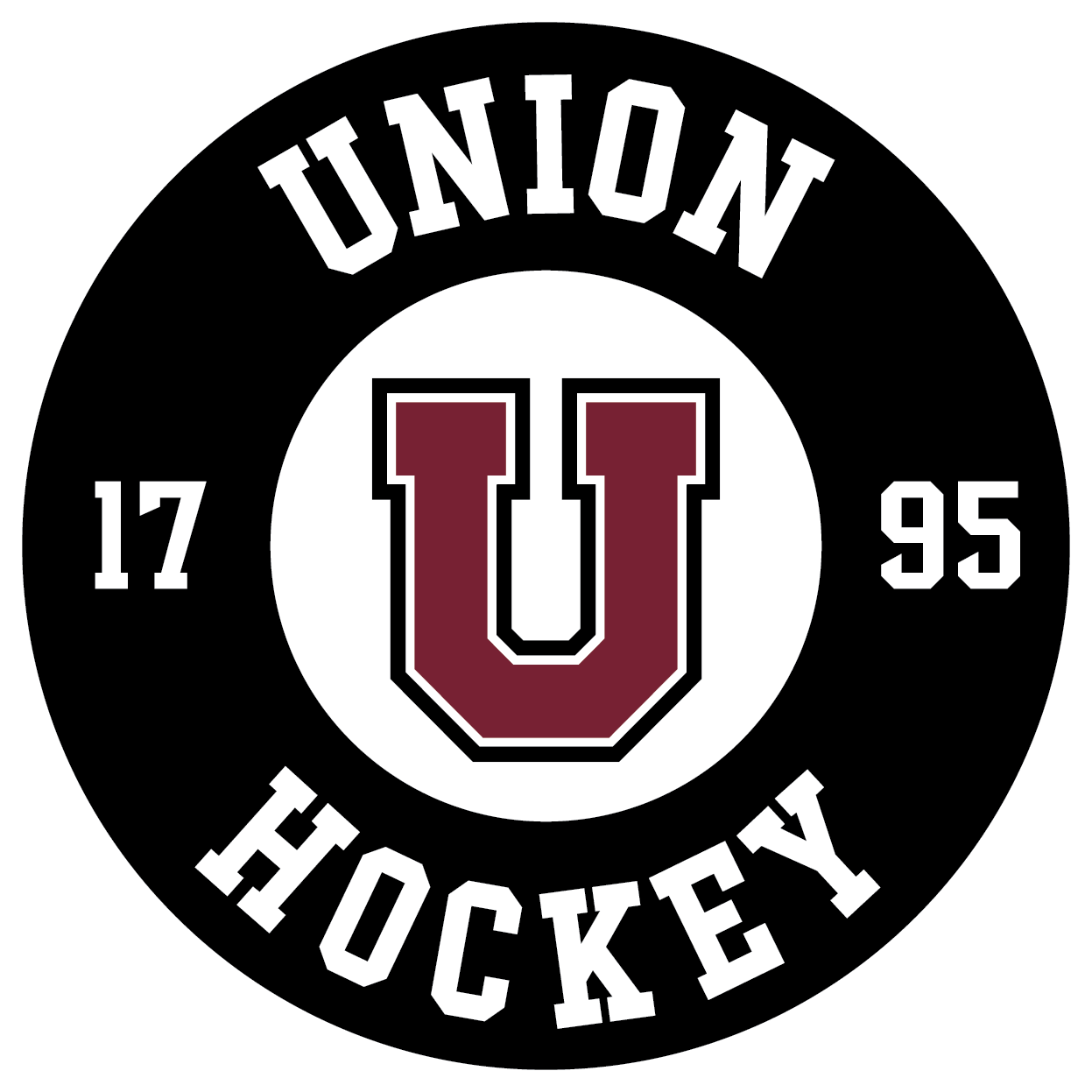
- Conference: 6th ECAC Hockey
- Home ice: Achilles Center

Rankings
- USCHO: NR
- USA Hockey: NR

Record
- Overall: 16–18–3
- Conference: 9–10–3
- Home: 8–8–1
- Road: 7–10–2
- Neutral: 1–0–0

Coaches and captains
- Head coach: Josh Hauge
- Assistant coaches: John Ronan; Lennie Childs; Bryan McDonald
- Captain: Ben Tupker
- Alternate captain(s): Chaz Smedsrud; Tyler Watkins

The 2023–24 Union Garnet Chargers men's ice hockey season was the 83rd season of play for the program, the 32nd at the Division I level and the 32nd in the ECAC Hockey conference. The Garnet Chargers represented Union College, played their home games at Achilles Center and were coached by Josh Hauge in his 2nd season.

== Season ==
Prior to the season, Union College announced that they had changed the moniker for their athletic teams from "Dutchmen / Dutchwomen" to "Garnet Chargers." Garnet has been the school's official color for 150 years, and the name "chargers" is a reference to "Schenectady’s legacy as a leader in electrical technologies."

Once the season began, Union found itself in a fortunate position as eight of its top nine scorers from '23 had returned. That solid foundation helped the team's offense flourish and average nearly a full goal more per game then they had the year before. The attack was led by defenseman John Prokop, who became the first blueliner in program history to lead the team in scoring twice. The bright sport on offense was the power play, which converted on 21.2% of the teams chances. However, while Union ended the season with the #3 offense in ECAC Hockey, they also had the second-worst defense. While the Chargers allowed less than 30 shots against per game, slightly below what they managed to generate, Kyle Chauvette's first year as the starting goaltender was not something to write home about. The sophomore was inconsistent throughout the season, alternating very poor stretches with solid goaltending.

The result of being pulled in opposite directions was that Union hovered around the even mark all season. Though the team was able to string wins together, every streak was countered by a lull and by season's end the team sat one game under .500. While the team had no chance for an NCAA tournament berth without a conference title, they at least began their postseason chase with a home stand. In one of their best games of the season, the Garnet Chargers rolled over Brown 6–0 and ended up with two short-handed goals in the game. In the quarterfinals, it was the team's power play that let them down. Union went 1 for 8 in the two games with Caden Villegas providing the only real offense in the series. The two losses ended Union's season and ensure the team a losing record for the fourth straight campaign.

== Departures ==
Player	Position	Nationality	Cause
Trevor Adams	Forward	United States	Left program (retired)
Matt Allen	Forward	United States	Graduate transfer to (Stonehill)
Owen Farris	Forward	United States	Graduation (retired)
Michael Hodge	Forward	Canada	Transferred to (Holy Cross)
Greg Japchen	Defenseman	United States	Transferred to (Stonehill)
Connor Murphy	Goaltender	United States	Graduation (signed with Calgary Wranglers)
Nick Petruolo	Defenseman	United States	Transferred to (Holy Cross)
Merek Pipes	Goaltender	Canada	Graduation (retired)
Christian Sanda	Forward	United States	Graduation (retired)
Bram Scheerer	Forward	United States	Left program (retired)
Andrew Seaman	Defenseman	United States	Left program (retired)
Mason Snell	Defenseman	Canada	Graduation (retired)
Chris Théodore	Forward	Canada	Graduate transfer to (Vermont)

== Recruiting ==
Player	Position	Nationality	Age	Notes
Brandon Buhr	Forward	Canada	21	Burnaby, BC; transfer from Clarkson
D. J. Hart	Defenseman	United States	21	Stamford, CT
Jacob Jeannette	Forward	United States	20	Duluth, MN
Cole Kodsi	Forward	United States	23	Boca Raton, FL; transfer from Bentley
Joe Messina	Defenseman	Canada	21	Woodbridge, ON
Eli Pilosof	Forward	Canada	21	Toronto, ON
Joey Potter	Defenseman	United States	20	Los Angeles, CA
Aksel Reid	Goaltender	United States	20	Minneapolis, MN

== Roster ==
As of August 2, 2023.

No.	Nat.	Player	Class	Pos	Height	Weight	DoB	Hometown	Previous team	NHL rights
2	(United States)	D. J. Hart	Freshman	D	6' 3" (1.91 m)	210 lb (95 kg)	2002-02-23	Stamford, Connecticut	Lincoln Stars (USHL)	—
3	(United States)	Cal Mell	Sophomore	D	5' 11" (1.8 m)	180 lb (82 kg)	2011-01-30	Alpharetta, Georgia	Janesville Jets (NAHL)	—
4	(United States)	Josh Phillips	Junior	D	6' 2" (1.88 m)	190 lb (86 kg)	2001-05-24	Getzville, New York	Minnesota Wilderness (NAHL)	—
5	(United States)	Joey Potter	Freshman	D	5' 11" (1.8 m)	185 lb (84 kg)	2003-05-09	Pittsburgh, Pennsylvania	Fairbanks Ice Dogs (NAHL)	—
6	(Canada)	Cullen Ferguson	Junior	D	6' 0" (1.83 m)	185 lb (84 kg)	2001-02-16	Binbrook, Ontario	Aberdeen Wings (NAHL)	—
7	(United States)	Nick Young	Sophomore	D	6' 3" (1.91 m)	215 lb (98 kg)	2001-09-12	Raleigh, North Carolina	St. Cloud Norsemen (NAHL)	—
8	(United States)	Chaz Smedsrud (A)	Senior	F	6' 2" (1.88 m)	195 lb (88 kg)	1998-06-04	Luverne, Minnesota	Madison Capitols (USHL)	—
9	(United States)	Thomas Richter	Junior	F	6' 1" (1.85 m)	175 lb (79 kg)	2000-06-06	Greenwich, Connecticut	Penticton Vees (BCHL)	—
10	(United States)	Ethan Benz	Sophomore	F	6' 1" (1.85 m)	190 lb (86 kg)	2001-03-29	Shakopee, Minnesota	St. Cloud Norsemen (NAHL)	—
11	(Canada)	Colby MacArthur	Sophomore	F	6' 3" (1.91 m)	185 lb (84 kg)	2001-11-02	Summerside, Prince Edward Island	Summerside Western Capitals (MHL)	—
12	(United States)	Carter Korpi	Sophomore	F	6' 0" (1.83 m)	185 lb (84 kg)	2001-07-28	South Lyon, Michigan	Wichita Falls Warriors (NAHL)	—
13	(United States)	Tyler Watkins (A)	Senior	F	5' 9" (1.75 m)	175 lb (79 kg)	1999-12-19	Hermantown, Minnesota	Minnesota Wilderness (NAHL)	—
14	(Canada)	Brandon Buhr	Sophomore	F	6' 2" (1.88 m)	200 lb (91 kg)	2002-07-07	North Vancouver, British Columbia	Alberni Valley Bulldogs (BCHL)	—
15	(Canada)	Josh Nixon	Junior	F	5' 9" (1.75 m)	175 lb (79 kg)	2000-05-09	Mississauga, Ontario	Lake Superior State (CCHA)	—
17	(United States)	Cole Kodsi	Junior	F	6' 2" (1.88 m)	200 lb (91 kg)	2000-06-17	Delray Beach, Florida	Bentley (AHA)	—
18	(Finland)	Ville Immonen	Senior	F	6' 2" (1.88 m)	200 lb (91 kg)	1999-06-18	Seinäjoki, Finland	Minot Minotauros (NAHL)	—
19	(Canada)	Liam Robertson	Senior	F	6' 2" (1.88 m)	170 lb (77 kg)	2000-05-14	Courtice, Ontario	Youngstown Phantoms (USHL)	—
20	(Canada)	Eli Pilosof	Freshman	F	5' 10" (1.78 m)	180 lb (82 kg)	2002-06-10	Toronto, Ontario	Pickering Panthers (OJHL)	—
21	(United States)	John Prokop	Sophomore	D	6' 3" (1.91 m)	185 lb (84 kg)	2001-05-13	Wausau, Wisconsin	Des Moines Buccaneers (USHL)	—
22	(United States)	Jacob Jeannette	Freshman	F	6' 1" (1.85 m)	200 lb (91 kg)	2002-12-13	Duluth, Minnesota	Tri-City Storm (USHL)	—
23	(Canada)	Joseph Messina	Freshman	D	5' 9" (1.75 m)	185 lb (84 kg)	2002-02-01	Woodbridge, Ontario	Langley Rivermen (BCHL)	—
24	(United States)	Nate Hanley	Sophomore	F	5' 11" (1.8 m)	185 lb (84 kg)	2002-05-30	Rocky Point, New York	Cedar Rapids RoughRiders (USHL)	—
26	(Canada)	Nathan Kelly	Senior	D	6' 0" (1.83 m)	185 lb (84 kg)	2000-11-22	South Delta, British Columbia	Chilliwack Chiefs (BCHL)	—
27	(Canada)	Ben Tupker (C)	Senior	F	6' 3" (1.91 m)	215 lb (98 kg)	1999-12-23	Collingwood, Ontario	Cornell (ECAC)	—
28	(United States)	Caden Villegas	Junior	F	5' 8" (1.73 m)	167 lb (76 kg)	2001-02-19	Plano, Texas	Tri-City Storm (USHL)	—
30	(United States)	Aksel Reid	Freshman	G	6' 1" (1.85 m)	185 lb (84 kg)	2003-08-05	Minneapolis, Minnesota	Springfield Jr. Blues (NAHL)	—
35	(United States)	Joe Sharib	Junior	G	5' 11" (1.8 m)	170 lb (77 kg)	2001-08-16	Natick, Massachusetts	Connecticut Jr. Rangers (NCDC)	—
36	(United States)	Kyle Chauvette	Sophomore	G	6' 1" (1.85 m)	170 lb (77 kg)	2001-10-05	Goffstown, New Hampshire	Youngstown Phantoms (USHL)	—

== Standings ==
2023–24 ECAC Hockey Standings
	Conference record										Overall record					
	GP	W	L	T	OTW	OTL	SW	PTS	GF	GA	GP	W	L	T	GF	GA
#6 Quinnipiac †	22	17	4	1	0	2	0	54	99	39	39	27	10	2	160	79
#9 Cornell *	22	12	6	4	1	2	3	44	74	45	35	22	7	6	115	65
Colgate	22	13	7	2	2	2	2	43	85	68	36	16	16	4	120	112
Dartmouth	22	9	6	7	1	1	3	37	66	60	32	13	10	9	92	91
Clarkson	22	12	9	1	4	2	1	36	62	58	35	18	16	1	95	97
Union	22	9	10	3	1	1	2	32	75	75	37	16	18	3	123	121
St. Lawrence	22	8	10	4	1	1	1	29	49	64	39	14	19	6	90	118
Harvard	22	6	10	6	1	2	3	28	49	64	32	7	19	6	70	106
Princeton	22	8	11	3	4	0	2	25	70	90	30	10	16	4	89	114
Yale	22	7	13	2	1	2	1	25	46	57	30	10	18	2	63	91
Brown	22	6	14	2	2	3	1	22	43	69	30	8	19	3	61	98
Rensselaer	22	6	13	3	0	0	0	21	58	89	37	10	23	4	93	150
Championship: March 23, 2024 † indicates conference regular season champion (Cleary Cup) * indicates conference tournament champion (Whitelaw Cup); Rankings: USCHO.com Top 20 Poll

== Schedule and results ==
Date	Time	Opponent^{#}	Rank^{#}	Site	TV	Decision	Result	Attendance	Record
Exhibition
October 7	3:00 pm	at Rensselaer*		Houston Field House • Troy, New York (Exhibition)	ESPN+		T 2–2 ^{SOL}		
Regular Season
October 8	7:00 pm	at Army*		Tate Rink • West Point, New York	FloHockey	Chauvette	W 6–0	2,033	1–0–0
October 13	9:00 pm	at Colorado College*		Ed Robson Arena • Colorado Springs, Colorado	SOCO CW	Chauvette	L 3–7	3,607	1–1–0
October 14	7:00 pm	at Colorado College*		Ed Robson Arena • Colorado Springs, Colorado		Chauvette	L 2–6	3,611	1–2–0
October 20	7:00 pm	Connecticut*		Achilles Rink • Schenectady, New York	ESPN+	Chauvette	W 4–1	2,100	2–2–0
October 21	4:00 pm	Connecticut*		Achilles Rink • Schenectady, New York	ESPN+	Chauvette	L 0–5	1,821	2–3–0
November 3	7:00 pm	Rensselaer		Achilles Rink • Schenectady, New York (Rivalry)	ESPN+	Reid	L 6–8	1,979	2–4–0 (0–1–0)
November 4	7:00 pm	at Rensselaer		Houston Field House • Troy, New York (Rivalry)	ESPN+	Chauvette	W 5–1	3,250	3–4–0 (1–1–0)
November 10	7:00 pm	at St. Lawrence		Appleton Arena • Canton, New York	ESPN+	Chauvette	W 4–3	1,150	4–4–0 (2–1–0)
November 11	4:00 pm	at Clarkson		Cheel Arena • Potsdam, New York	ESPN+	Chauvette	L 1–4	2,621	4–5–0 (2–2–0)
November 24	7:00 pm	Stonehill*		Achilles Rink • Schenectady, New York	ESPN+	Chauvette	W 5–2	1,283	5–5–0
November 25	7:00 pm	Stonehill*		Achilles Rink • Schenectady, New York	ESPN+	Chauvette	W 4–0	1,115	6–5–0
December 1	7:00 pm	Princeton		Achilles Rink • Schenectady, New York	ESPN+	Chauvette	W 7–2	1,338	7–5–0 (3–2–0)
December 2	4:00 pm	#5 Quinnipiac		Achilles Rink • Schenectady, New York	ESPN+	Chauvette	L 0–5	1,532	7–6–0 (3–3–0)
December 6	7:00 pm	#8 Maine*		Achilles Rink • Schenectady, New York	ESPN+	Chauvette	L 1–3	1,192	7–7–0
December 8	7:00 pm	at Vermont*		Gutterson Fieldhouse • Burlington, Vermont	ESPN+	Sharib	W 5–4	2,061	8–7–0
December 9	7:00 pm	at Vermont*		Gutterson Fieldhouse • Burlington, Vermont	ESPN+	Sharib	L 1–4	2,122	8–8–0
December 30	7:00 pm	at Bentley*		Bentley Arena • Waltham, Massachusetts	FloHockey	Chauvette	L 3–4	1,275	8–9–0
January 5	7:00 pm	Brown		Achilles Rink • Schenectady, New York	ESPN+	Chauvette	L 2–3	1,822	8–10–0 (3–4–0)
January 6	4:00 pm	Yale		Achilles Rink • Schenectady, New York	ESPN+	Chauvette	L 2–4	1,904	8–11–0 (3–5–0)
January 12	7:00 pm	Clarkson		Achilles Rink • Schenectady, New York	ESPN+	Chauvette	W 5–1	2,056	9–11–0 (4–5–0)
January 13	4:00 pm	St. Lawrence		Achilles Rink • Schenectady, New York	ESPN+	Chauvette	T 2–2 ^{SOW}	1,684	9–11–1 (4–5–1)
January 19	7:00 pm	at Dartmouth		Thompson Arena • Hanover, New Hampshire	ESPN+	Chauvette	W 5–1	1,429	10–11–1 (5–5–1)
January 20	7:00 pm	at Harvard		Bright-Landry Hockey Center • Boston, Massachusetts	ESPN+	Chauvette	W 5–4	3,095	11–11–1 (6–5–1)
January 27	6:00 pm	vs. Rensselaer*		MVP Arena • Albany, New York (Mayor's Cup)		Chauvette	W 5–3	5,698	12–11–1
February 2	7:00 pm	at Yale		Ingalls Rink • New Haven, Connecticut	ESPN+	Chauvette	L 1–3	1,371	12–12–1 (6–6–1)
February 3	7:00 pm	at Brown		Meehan Auditorium • Providence, Rhode Island	ESPN+	Chauvette	T 4–4 ^{SOW}	330	12–12–2 (6–6–2)
February 9	7:00 pm	Colgate		Achilles Rink • Schenectady, New York	ESPN+	Chauvette	W 5–3	1,992	13–12–2 (7–6–2)
February 10	7:00 pm	#13 Cornell		Achilles Rink • Schenectady, New York	ESPN+	Chauvette	L 1–6	2,230	13–13–2 (7–7–2)
February 16	7:00 pm	at #9 Quinnipiac		M&T Bank Arena • Hamden, Connecticut	ESPN+	Chauvette	L 2–6	3,076	13–14–2 (7–8–2)
February 17	7:00 pm	at Princeton		Hobey Baker Memorial Rink • Princeton, New Jersey	ESPN+	Chauvette	T 2–2 ^{SOL}	1,196	13–14–3 (7–8–3)
February 23	7:00 pm	Harvard		Achilles Rink • Schenectady, New York	ESPN+	Chauvette	W 6–2	2,197	14–14–3 (8–8–3)
February 24	4:00 pm	Dartmouth		Achilles Rink • Schenectady, New York	ESPN+	Chauvette	L 4–5	2,024	14–15–3 (8–9–3)
March 1	7:00 pm	at #13 Cornell		Lynah Rink • Ithaca, New York	ESPN+	Chauvette	W 3–2	3,855	15–15–3 (9–9–3)
March 2	7:00 pm	at Colgate		Class of 1965 Arena • Hamilton, New York	ESPN+	Chauvette	L 3–4	1,100	15–16–3 (9–10–3)
ECAC Hockey Tournament
March 9	4:00 pm	Brown*		Achilles Rink • Schenectady, New York (First Round)	ESPN+	Chauvette	W 6–0	2,035	16–16–3
March 15	7:00 pm	at Dartmouth*		Thompson Arena • Hanover, New Hampshire (Quarterfinal Game 1)	ESPN+	Chauvette	L 1–3	1,625	16–17–3
March 16	7:00 pm	at Dartmouth*		Thompson Arena • Hanover, New Hampshire (Quarterfinal Game 2)	ESPN+	Chauvette	L 2–4	2,007	16–18–3
*Non-conference game. ^{#}Rankings from USCHO.com Poll. All times are in Eastern Time. Source:

== Scoring statistics ==
Name	Position	Games	Goals	Assists	Points	PIM
John Prokop	D	36	8	27	35	43
Caden Villegas	F	37	12	18	30	4
Josh Nixon	RW	36	9	18	27	33
Nate Hanley	C	37	4	22	26	10
Brandon Buhr	F	35	11	13	24	4
Ville Immonen	C	36	8	16	24	18
Liam Robertson	C	34	10	13	23	20
Chaz Smedsrud	LW	37	14	8	22	6
Ben Tupker	LW	34	9	10	19	24
Cullen Ferguson	D	37	3	15	18	60
Tyler Watkins	F	36	8	8	16	4
Carter Korpi	F	35	10	3	13	36
Colby MacArthur	RW	29	4	6	10	4
Nathan Kelly	D	35	1	7	8	23
Nick Young	D	37	2	5	7	26
Jacob Jeannette	RW	33	0	7	7	37
Cal Mell	D	35	0	7	7	12
Ethan Benz	F	15	4	1	5	10
D. J. Hart	D	22	1	4	5	25
Cole Kodsi	LW	16	3	1	4	8
Joseph Messina	D	22	1	3	4	10
Joey Potter	D	21	0	3	3	4
Thomas Richter	F	2	1	0	1	0
Eli Pilosof	C	1	0	0	0	2
Aksel Reid	G	1	0	0	0	0
Josh Phillips	D	2	0	0	0	2
Joe Sharib	G	4	0	0	0	0
Kyle Chauvette	G	36	0	0	0	0
Total			123	215	338	433

== Goaltending statistics ==
Name	Games	Minutes	Wins	Losses	Ties	Goals against	Saves	Shut outs	SV %	GAA
Joe Sharib	4	135:27	1	1	0	5	60	0	.923	2.21
Aksel Reid	1	21:39	0	1	0	1	4	0	.800	2.77
Kyle Chauvette	36	2044:28	15	16	3	104	865	3	.893	3.05
Empty Net	-	39:08	-	-	-	11	-	-	-	-
Total	37	2240:42	16	18	3	121	929	3	.885	3.24

== Rankings ==
Poll	Week																										
Poll	Pre	1	2	3	4	5	6	7	8	9	10	11	12	13	14	15	16	17	18	19	20	21	22	23	24	25	26 (Final)
USCHO.com	NR	NR	NR	NR	NR	NR	NR	NR	NR	NR	NR	–	NR	NR	NR	NR	NR	NR	NR	NR	NR	NR	NR	NR	NR	–	NR
USA Hockey	NR	NR	NR	NR	NR	NR	NR	NR	NR	NR	NR	NR	–	NR	NR	NR	NR	NR	NR	NR	NR	NR	NR	NR	NR	NR	NR

Note: USCHO did not release a poll in weeks 11 and 25.
Note: USA Hockey did not release a poll in week 12.

== Awards and honors ==
Player	Award	Ref
John Prokop	AHCA East Second Team All-American	
Ben Tupker	Wayne Dean Sportsmanship Award	
John Prokop	ECAC Hockey First Team	
Liam Robertson	ECAC Hockey Second Team	
