= 2024–25 Union Garnet Chargers men's ice hockey season =

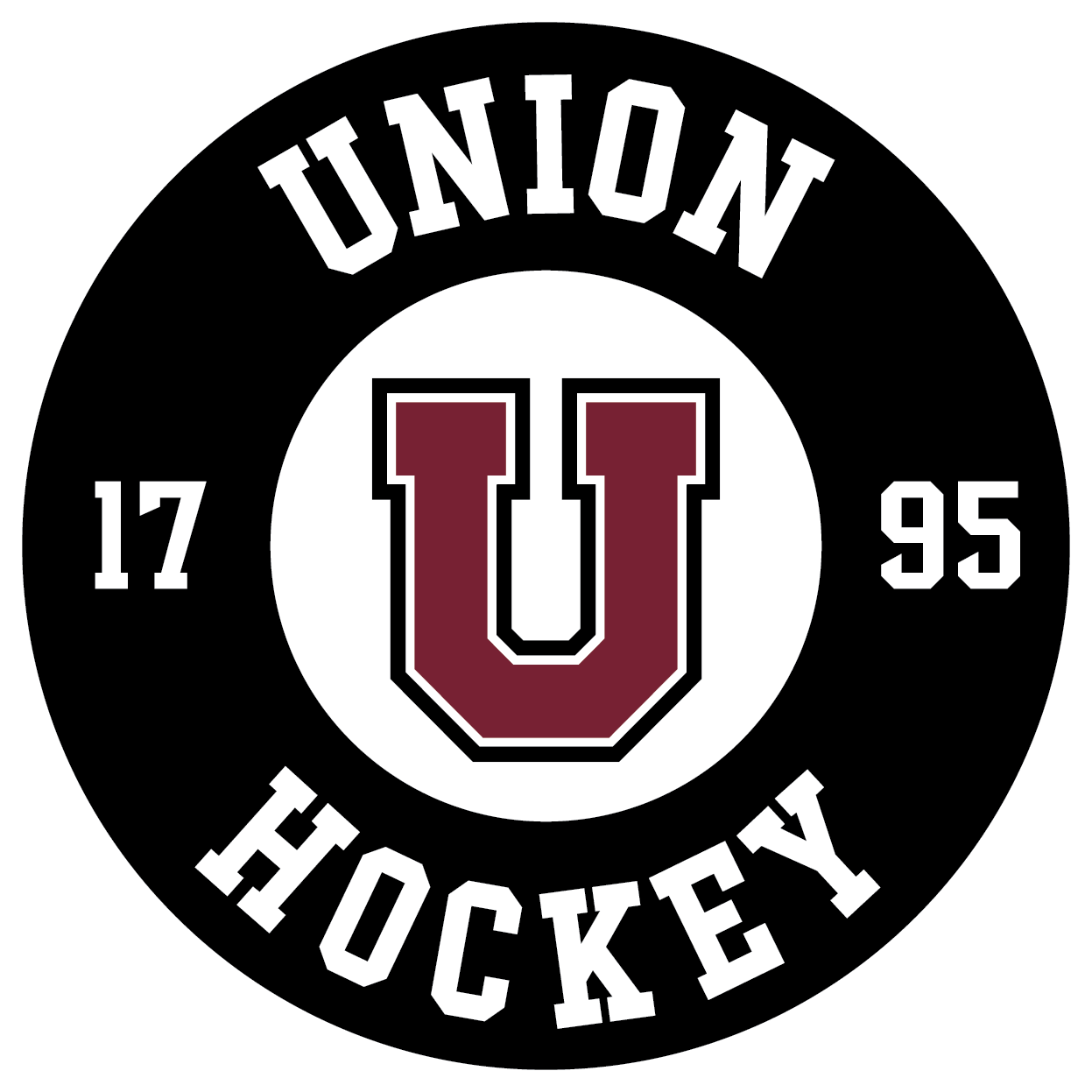
- Conference: 4th ECAC Hockey
- Home ice: Achilles Center

Rankings
- USCHO: NR
- USA Hockey: NR

Record
- Overall: 19–14–3
- Conference: 12–8–2
- Home: 9–9–2
- Road: 9–5–1
- Neutral: 1–0–0

Coaches and captains
- Head coach: Josh Hauge
- Assistant coaches: John Ronan; Mike Zannella; Bryan McDonald
- Captain: Cullen Ferguson
- Alternate captain(s): Josh Nixon; John Prokop; Caden Villegas; Nick Young

The 2024–25 Union Garnet Chargers men's ice hockey season was the 84th season of play for the program, the 33rd at the Division I level and the 33rd in the ECAC Hockey conference. The Garnet Chargers represented Union College in the 2024–25 NCAA Division I men's ice hockey season, played their home games at Achilles Center and were coached by Josh Hauge in his 3rd season.

== Season ==
Union's season started well for the team with the Chargers winning six of their first seven games. The club's success was largely based upon their offense at this point which was averaging 4 goals a game, albeit mostly against weak opposition. While no one player was leading the charge at this time, Union got a considerable boost from freshman Ben Muthersbaugh who was among the team leaders in points. The Garnet Chargers continued to score their way to victories through November as well, holding a 9–3–1 record after two months of play. In spite of this, however, the team remained outside the polls due to the fact that all of their wins came against lesser squads. The strongest team they were able to defeat to that point was Army who finished 47th in the national polls. To make matters worse, the team went through an offensive slump in December, losing four consecutive game to lose any argument for their inclusion among the best collegiate teams in the country.

The team returned after the winter break and got back to its winning ways, but saw very similar results to the first half of the season; Union would win against weak opponents but lost whenever they faced a moderately strong opponent. The only outlier in this trend was Cornell, whom Union was able to defeat twice during the season. The relative weakness of the conference this season was a catch-22 for Union because, since they faced a sizable array of weak opponents, the team was able to post a good record by season's end. However, their overall rating suffered due to their poor strength of schedule. Union remained in the bottom half of the PairWise despite going 10–5–2 since the start of January and had no chance for an at-large berth.

The team was able to edge ahead of Dartmouth for 4th place and earn the final bye into the quarterfinal round. Unfortunately, the Big Green were none too pleased about the result and took their revenge on Union when the two met. The Chargers were able to twice get into the lead in the first game but appeared to weaken as the game progressed. The Union attack was able to fire 15 shots on goal in the first but could only conjure up 2 shots in the third. This happened despite the team being behind in the final 12 minutes and desperate to tie the score. The rematch saw a complete implosion on the back end with the team surrendering 7 goals to Dartmouth. The Chargers seemed completely at a loss at how to handle the speed of the visitors and the resounding defeat brought their season to an end.

== Departures ==
Player	Position	Nationality	Cause
Ville Immonen	Forward	Finland	Graduate transfer to (Bowling Green)
Nathan Kelly	Defenseman	Canada	Graduation (signed with Norfolk Admirals)
Cole Kodsi	Forward	United States	Graduate transfer to (Canisius)
Joey Potter	Defenseman	United States	Transferred to (Alaska Anchorage)
Aksel Reid	Goaltender	United States	Transferred to (Hamilton)
Liam Robertson	Forward	Canada	Graduation (signed with Wichita Thunder)
Chaz Smedsrud	Forward	United States	Graduation (signed with Allen Americans)
Ben Tupker	Forward	Canada	Graduation (signed with Trois-Rivières Lions)
Tyler Watkins	Forward	United States	Graduation (signed with Dunaújvárosi Acélbikák)

== Recruiting ==
Player	Position	Nationality	Age	Notes
Riley Brueck	Forward	United States	21	Chesterfield, MO
Lucas Buzziol	Forward	Canada	20	Mississauga, ON
David Côté	Defenseman	Canada	20	Saint-Bruno-de-Montarville, QC
Parker Lindauer	Forward	United States	23	Madison, WI; transfer from Maine
Lucas Massie	Goaltender	United States	21	Claremont, CA
Brendan Miles	Defenseman	United States	22	Farmington Hills, MI; transfer from Michigan
Ben Muthersbaugh	Forward	United States	20	Gilford, NH
Connor Smith	Forward	United States	21	Hugo, MN
Drew Sutton	Forward	United States	21	Hortonville, WI

== Roster ==
As of September 21, 2024.

No.	Nat.	Player	Class	Pos	Height	Weight	DoB	Hometown	Previous team	NHL rights
2	(United States)	D. J. Hart	Sophomore	D	6' 3" (1.91 m)	210 lb (95 kg)	2002-02-23	Stamford, Connecticut	Lincoln Stars (USHL)	—
3	(United States)	Cal Mell	Junior	D	5' 11" (1.8 m)	180 lb (82 kg)	2011-01-30	Alpharetta, Georgia	Janesville Jets (NAHL)	—
4	(United States)	Josh Phillips	Senior	D	6' 2" (1.88 m)	190 lb (86 kg)	2001-05-24	Getzville, New York	Minnesota Wilderness (NAHL)	—
5	(Canada)	David Côté	Freshman	D	6' 4" (1.93 m)	201 lb (91 kg)	2003-10-08	Saint-Bruno-de-Montarville, Quebec	Steinbach Pistons (MJHL)	—
6	(Canada)	Cullen Ferguson (C)	Senior	D	6' 0" (1.83 m)	185 lb (84 kg)	2001-02-16	Binbrook, Ontario	Aberdeen Wings (NAHL)	—
7	(United States)	Nick Young (A)	Junior	D	6' 3" (1.91 m)	215 lb (98 kg)	2001-09-12	Raleigh, North Carolina	St. Cloud Norsemen (NAHL)	—
8	(United States)	Connor Smith	Freshman	F	5' 11" (1.8 m)	172 lb (78 kg)	2003-06-06	Hugo, Minnesota	Oklahoma Warriors (NAHL)	—
9	(United States)	Thomas Richter	Senior	F	6' 1" (1.85 m)	175 lb (79 kg)	2000-06-06	Greenwich, Connecticut	Penticton Vees (BCHL)	—
10	(United States)	Ethan Benz	Junior	F	6' 1" (1.85 m)	190 lb (86 kg)	2001-03-29	Shakopee, Minnesota	St. Cloud Norsemen (NAHL)	—
11	(Canada)	Colby MacArthur	Junior	F	6' 3" (1.91 m)	185 lb (84 kg)	2001-11-02	Summerside, Prince Edward Island	Summerside Western Capitals (MHL)	—
12	(United States)	Carter Korpi	Junior	F	6' 0" (1.83 m)	185 lb (84 kg)	2001-07-28	South Lyon, Michigan	Wichita Falls Warriors (NAHL)	—
14	(Canada)	Brandon Buhr	Junior	F	6' 2" (1.88 m)	200 lb (91 kg)	2002-07-07	North Vancouver, British Columbia	Alberni Valley Bulldogs (BCHL)	—
15	(Canada)	Josh Nixon	Senior	F	5' 9" (1.75 m)	175 lb (79 kg)	2000-05-09	Mississauga, Ontario	Lake Superior State (CCHA)	—
16	(Canada)	Lucas Buzziol	Freshman	F	6' 1" (1.85 m)	194 lb (88 kg)	2004-04-05	Mississauga, Ontario	Alberni Valley Bulldogs (BCHL)	—
17	(United States)	Parker Lindauer	Junior	F	5' 11" (1.8 m)	172 lb (78 kg)	2001-05-17	Madison, Wisconsin	Maine (HEA)	—
18	(United States)	Ben Muthersbaugh	Freshman	F	5' 11" (1.8 m)	187 lb (85 kg)	2004-02-15	Gilford, New Hampshire	Cedar Rapids RoughRiders (USHL)	—
19	(United States)	Drew Sutton	Freshman	F	5' 10" (1.78 m)	170 lb (77 kg)	2003-02-10	Hortonville, Wisconsin	Oklahoma Warriors (NAHL)	—
20	(Canada)	Eli Pilosof	Sophomore	F	5' 10" (1.78 m)	180 lb (82 kg)	2002-06-10	Toronto, Ontario	Pickering Panthers (OJHL)	—
21	(United States)	John Prokop (A)	Junior	D	6' 3" (1.91 m)	185 lb (84 kg)	2001-05-13	Wausau, Wisconsin	Des Moines Buccaneers (USHL)	—
22	(United States)	Jacob Jeannette	Sophomore	F	6' 1" (1.85 m)	200 lb (91 kg)	2002-12-13	Duluth, Minnesota	Tri-City Storm (USHL)	—
23	(Canada)	Joseph Messina	Sophomore	D	5' 9" (1.75 m)	185 lb (84 kg)	2002-02-01	Woodbridge, Ontario	Langley Rivermen (BCHL)	—
24	(United States)	Nate Hanley	Junior	F	5' 11" (1.8 m)	185 lb (84 kg)	2002-05-30	Rocky Point, New York	Cedar Rapids RoughRiders (USHL)	—
26	(United States)	Brendan Miles	Junior	D	6' 1" (1.85 m)	180 lb (82 kg)	2001-12-12	Farmington Hills, Michigan	Michigan (Big Ten)	—
27	(United States)	Riley Brueck	Freshman	F	6' 2" (1.88 m)	190 lb (86 kg)	2003-05-07	Chesterfield, Missouri	Oklahoma Warriors (NAHL)	—
28	(United States)	Caden Villegas (A)	Senior	F	5' 8" (1.73 m)	167 lb (76 kg)	2001-02-19	Plano, Texas	Tri-City Storm (USHL)	—
31	(United States)	Lucas Massie	Freshman	G	6' 1" (1.85 m)	190 lb (86 kg)	2003-04-11	Claremont, California	Lincoln Stars (USHL)	—
35	(United States)	Joe Sharib	Senior	G	5' 11" (1.8 m)	170 lb (77 kg)	2001-08-16	Natick, Massachusetts	Connecticut Jr. Rangers (NCDC)	—
36	(United States)	Kyle Chauvette	Junior	G	6' 1" (1.85 m)	170 lb (77 kg)	2001-10-05	Goffstown, New Hampshire	Youngstown Phantoms (USHL)	—

== Standings ==
2024–25 ECAC Hockey Standings
	Conference record										Overall record					
	GP	W	L	T	OTW	OTL	SW	PTS	GF	GA	GP	W	L	T	GF	GA
#15 Quinnipiac †	22	16	5	1	2	3	0	50	79	42	38	24	12	2	135	83
#20 Clarkson	22	15	6	1	2	1	0	45	74	47	39	24	12	3	121	87
Colgate	22	13	7	2	2	2	1	42	80	65	36	18	15	3	114	116
Union	22	12	8	2	0	0	2	40	67	61	36	19	14	3	112	109
Dartmouth	22	12	9	1	0	2	0	39	70	52	33	18	13	2	110	84
#12 Cornell *	22	10	8	4	1	0	3	36	69	53	36	19	11	6	112	82
Harvard	22	9	10	3	2	2	1	31	56	56	33	13	17	3	85	97
Brown	22	9	11	2	3	0	2	28	53	63	32	14	15	3	79	85
Princeton	22	7	12	3	2	2	1	25	55	73	30	12	15	3	71	86
Rensselaer	22	7	15	0	0	2	0	23	57	82	35	12	21	2	101	131
Yale	22	5	14	3	1	1	1	19	52	80	30	6	21	3	67	121
St. Lawrence	22	5	15	2	1	1	1	18	43	81	35	9	24	2	71	121
Championship: March 22, 2025 † indicates conference regular season champion (Cleary Cup) * indicates conference tournament champion (Whitelaw Cup); Rankings: USCHO.com Top 20 Poll

== Schedule and results ==
Date	Time	Opponent^{#}	Rank^{#}	Site	TV	Decision	Result	Attendance	Record
Exhibition
October 5	1:00 pm	#13 Providence*		Achilles Rink • Schenectady, New York (Exhibition)	ESPN+		L 1–4		
Regular Season
October 6	4:00 pm	Army*		Achilles Rink • Schenectady, New York	ESPN+	Chauvette	W 4–3 ^{OT}	1,553	1–0–0
October 11	7:00 pm	at Stonehill*		Bridgewater Ice Arena • Bridgewater, Massachusetts	NEC Front Row	Chauvette	W 4–2	337	2–0–0
October 12	7:00 pm	at #3 Boston University*		Agganis Arena • Boston, Massachusetts	ESPN+	Chauvette	L 1–4	4,954	2–1–0
October 18	7:00 pm	Mercyhurst*		Achilles Rink • Schenectady, New York	ESPN+	Chauvette	W 6–2	1,605	3–1–0
October 19	5:00 pm	Mercyhurst*		Achilles Rink • Schenectady, New York	ESPN+	Chauvette	W 3–2	1,983	4–1–0
October 25	7:00 pm	at Rensselaer		Houston Field House • Troy, New York (Rivalry)	ESPN+	Chauvette	W 6–3	2,931	5–1–0 (1–0–0)
October 26	7:00 pm	Rensselaer		Achilles Rink • Schenectady, New York (Rivalry)	ESPN+	Chauvette	W 4–3	2,076	6–1–0 (2–0–0)
November 8	7:00 pm	Alaska*		Achilles Rink • Schenectady, New York	ESPN+	Chauvette	T 3–3 ^{OT}	1,267	6–1–1
November 9	4:00 pm	Alaska*		Achilles Rink • Schenectady, New York	ESPN+	Massie	L 4–6	1,681	6–2–1
November 15	7:00 pm	St. Lawrence		Achilles Rink • Schenectady, New York	ESPN+	Chauvette	W 4–0	1,724	7–2–1 (3–0–0)
November 16	4:00 pm	Clarkson		Achilles Rink • Schenectady, New York	ESPN+	Chauvette	L 1–4	2,061	7–3–1 (3–1–0)
November 29	6:00 pm	at Niagara*		Dwyer Arena • Lewiston, New York	FloHockey	Chauvette	W 4–2	769	8–3–1
November 30	5:00 pm	at Niagara*		Dwyer Arena • Lewiston, New York	FloHockey	Chauvette	W 5–3	628	9–3–1
December 6	7:00 pm	at Princeton		Hobey Baker Memorial Rink • Princeton, New Jersey	ESPN+	Chauvette	L 1–2	1,384	9–4–1 (3–2–0)
December 7	4:00 pm	at #18 Quinnipiac		M&T Bank Arena • Hamden, Connecticut	ESPN+	Chauvette	L 1–3	3,008	9–5–1 (3–3–0)
December 13	7:00 pm	Vermont*		Achilles Rink • Schenectady, New York	ESPN+	Chauvette	L 2–6	1,328	9–6–1
December 14	4:00 pm	Vermont*		Achilles Rink • Schenectady, New York	ESPN+	Chauvette	L 2–3	1,746	9–7–1
January 3	7:00 pm	at Brown		Meehan Auditorium • Providence, Rhode Island	ESPN+	Chauvette	W 3–1	844	10–7–1 (4–3–1)
January 4	7:00 pm	at Yale		Ingalls Rink • New Haven, Connecticut	ESPN+	Chauvette	W 4–3	1,394	11–7–1 (5–3–1)
January 10	7:00 pm	at #19 Clarkson		Cheel Arena • Potsdam, New York	ESPN+	Chauvette	L 3–5	2,473	11–8–1 (5–4–1)
January 11	7:00 pm	at St. Lawrence		Appleton Arena • Canton, New York	ESPN+	Massie	W 8–5	1,116	12–8–1 (6–4–1)
January 17	7:00 pm	Dartmouth		Achilles Rink • Schenectady, New York	ESPN+	Chauvette	L 0–4	1,621	12–9–1 (6–5–1)
January 18	4:00 pm	Harvard		Achilles Rink • Schenectady, New York	ESPN+	Chauvette	W 4–1	1,973	13–9–1 (7–5–1)
January 25	6:00 pm	vs. Rensselaer*		MVP Arena • Albany, New York (Mayor's Cup)		Chauvette	W 3–2 ^{OT}	7,306	14–9–1
January 31	7:00 pm	Yale		Achilles Rink • Schenectady, New York	ESPN+	Chauvette	T 3–3 ^{SOW}	1,419	14–9–2 (7–5–2)
February 1	4:00 pm	Brown		Achilles Rink • Schenectady, New York	ESPN+	Chauvette	W 2–1	1,986	15–9–2 (8–5–2)
February 7	7:00 pm	at Colgate		Class of 1965 Arena • Hamilton, New York	ESPN+	Chauvette	T 2–2 ^{SOW}	921	15–9–3 (8–5–3)
February 8	7:00 pm	at Cornell		Lynah Rink • Ithaca, New York	ESPN+	Chauvette	W 4–1	3,893	16–9–3 (9–5–3)
February 14	7:00 pm	#15 Quinnipiac		Achilles Rink • Schenectady, New York	ESPN+	Chauvette	L 2–7	1,889	16–10–3 (9–6–3)
February 15	4:00 pm	Princeton		Achilles Rink • Schenectady, New York	ESPN+	Chauvette	W 7–4	1,625	17–10–3 (10–6–3)
February 21	7:00 pm	at Harvard		Bright-Landry Hockey Center • Boston, Massachusetts	ESPN+	Chauvette	W 2–1	2,372	18–10–3 (11–6–3)
February 22	4:00 pm	at Dartmouth		Thompson Arena • Hanover, New Hampshire	ESPN+	Chauvette	L 1–2	2,500	18–11–3 (11–7–3)
February 28	7:00 pm	Cornell		Achilles Rink • Schenectady, New York	ESPN+	Chauvette	W 4–1	2,112	19–11–3 (12–7–3)
March 1	4:00 pm	Colgate		Achilles Rink • Schenectady, New York	ESPN+	Chauvette	L 1–5	2,296	19–12–3 (12–8–3)
ECAC Hockey Tournament
March 14	7:00 pm	Dartmouth*		Achilles Rink • Schenectady, New York (ECAC Quarterfinal Game 1)	ESPN+	Chauvette	L 2–3	2,302	19–13–3
March 15	7:00 pm	Dartmouth*		Achilles Rink • Schenectady, New York (ECAC Quarterfinal Game 2)	ESPN+	Chauvette	L 2–7	2,298	19–14–3
*Non-conference game. ^{#}Rankings from USCHO.com Poll. All times are in Eastern Time. Source:

== Scoring statistics ==
Name	Position	Games	Goals	Assists	Points	PIM
Caden Villegas	F	36	7	22	29	16
Colby MacArthur	RW	36	7	22	29	18
Brandon Buhr	F	36	19	9	28	25
Ben Muthersbaugh	LW	36	13	15	28	31
Nate Hanley	C	35	10	18	28	4
John Prokop	D	36	8	19	27	20
Josh Nixon	RW	36	14	9	23	20
Cullen Ferguson	D	36	4	12	16	39
Parker Lindauer	F	34	3	11	14	10
Lucas Buzziol	C	29	5	8	13	14
Riley Brueck	F	33	3	7	10	6
Nick Young	D	36	2	8	10	18
Carter Korpi	F	18	6	2	8	8
D. J. Hart	D	32	3	5	8	33
Brendan Miles	D	29	0	7	7	10
Drew Sutton	F	35	3	3	6	2
Jacob Jeannette	RW	29	2	3	5	12
Joseph Messina	D	26	1	3	4	4
Ethan Benz	F	14	1	1	2	0
Connor Smith	F	22	1	0	1	6
Thomas Richter	F	7	0	1	1	0
Josh Phillips	D	18	0	1	1	2
Cal Mell	D	24	0	1	1	6
Lucas Massie	G	2	0	0	0	0
Joe Sharib	G	3	0	0	0	0
David Côté	D	12	0	0	0	2
Kyle Chauvette	G	35	0	0	0	0
Bench	–	–	–	–	–	10
Total			112	187	299	316

== Goaltending statistics ==
Name	Games	Minutes	Wins	Losses	Ties	Goals against	Saves	Shut outs	SV %	GAA
Joe Sharib	3	29:37	0	0	0	0	7	0	1.000	0.00
Kyle Chauvette	35	2036:56	18	13	3	95	817	1	.896	2.80
Lucas Massie	2	83:49	1	1	0	8	33	0	.805	5.73
Empty Net	-	39:32	-	-	-	6	-	-	-	-
Total	36	2179:54	19	14	3	109	857	1	.887	3.00

== Rankings ==
Poll	Week																											
Poll	Pre	1	2	3	4	5	6	7	8	9	10	11	12	13	14	15	16	17	18	19	20	21	22	23	24	25	26	27 (Final)
USCHO.com	NR	NR	NR	NR	NR	NR	NR	NR	NR	NR	NR	NR	-	NR	NR	NR	NR	NR	NR	NR	NR	NR	NR	NR	NR	NR	-	NR
USA Hockey	NR	NR	NR	NR	NR	20	NR	RV	RV	RV	NR	NR	-	NR	NR	NR	NR	NR	NR	NR	NR	NR	NR	NR	NR	NR	NR	NR

Note: USCHO did not release a poll in week 12 or 26.
Note: USA Hockey did not release a poll in week 12.

== Awards and honors ==
Player	Award	Ref
Kyle Chauvette	All-ECAC Hockey Third Team	
John Prokop	All-ECAC Hockey Third Team	
Brandon Buhr	All-ECAC Hockey Third Team	
Ben Muthersbaugh	ECAC Hockey All-Rookie Team	
