= Arthur C. Lawrence =

American football, baseball, and ice hockey coach

Playing career

Football
- 1932–1933: Purdue
- Position: Center

Coaching career (HC unless noted)

Football
- 1934–1940: Union (NY) (assistant)
- 1941–1942: Union (NY)

Baseball
- 1939–1942: Union (NY)
- 1946–1975: Union (NY)

Ice hockey
- 1935–1936: Union (NY)
- 1939–1942: Union (NY)
- 1947–1949: Union (NY)

Head coaching record
- Overall: 5–9–2 (football); 10–30–2 (ice hockey)

Arthur C. Lawrence was an American college football, baseball and ice hockey coach. He served as the head football coach at Union College in Schenectady, New York from 1941 to 1942, compiling a record of 5–9–2. Lawrence was also the school's head hockey coach (1935–1936, 1940–1942, 1947–1948) and head baseball coach (1939–1942, 1946–1975).
