= Governor's Cup (New York) =

Annual ice hockey tournament

The Governor's Cup was an annual ice hockey tournament hosted by Rensselaer Polytechnic Institute and Union College. The tournament was sponsored by Citizens Bank and was held each fall at the Times Union Center in Albany, NY.

The Governor's Cup began in 2006 and was intended to increase interest in the ECAC Hockey League, which holds its championship tournament at the same location in March. Both Rensselaer and Union participated in the tournament each year, and two other teams (usually from the ECAC Hockey League) were invited to complete the field.

The tournament was short-lived, lasting only a few years before having to disband due to losing their sponsorship. However, Rensselaer and Union have recently revitalized the spirit of this tournament by annually playing a single non-conference game in Albany, with the winner being awarded a trophy called the "Mayor's Cup".

Union won the inaugural Mayor's Cup game in 2013 by a score of 3–2. The rematch in 2014 received considerable media attention when, just as Rensselaer won 2–1, a brawl broke out between both teams and included a confrontation between the coaches.

== Tournament results ==
Year	Champion	Runner-up	Consolation winner	Consolation runner-up
2006	Rensselaer	Colgate	Quinnipiac	Union
2007	Rensselaer	Colgate	St. Lawrence	Union
2008	Union	Colgate	Rensselaer	Robert Morris
