= RPI–Union men's ice hockey rivalry =

Ice hockey rivalry in the United States

- RPI Engineers Union Garnet Chargers
- Sport: Ice hockey
- First meeting: February 26, 1904; Rensselaer 6, Union 2
- Latest meeting: 4 January 2026
- Next meeting: TBD
- Stadiums: Houston Field House; M&T Bank Center
- Trophy: Mayor's Cup

Statistics
- Total meetings: 121
- All-time series: Rensselaer, 57–52–12 (.559)
- Trophy series: Union, 15–3–3 (.475)
- Largest victory: Rensselaer, 13–0 (7 November 1987)
- Longest win streak: Union, 10(15 November 2011 – 16 November 2013)

Locations of Rensselaer and Union

The RPI–Union men's ice hockey rivalry is a college ice hockey rivalry between the RPI Engineers men's ice hockey and Union Garnet Chargers men's ice hockey programs. The first meeting between the two occurred on February 26, 1904.

== History ==
Rensselaer was one of the first schools outside of the Ivy League to play varsity ice hockey, holding their first game during the 1901–02 season. Two years later, The Cherry and White met their capital district counterparts for the first time. Because neither program had an on-campus rink, the game was played at the Empire Rink in nearby Albany, New York. The converted curling venue wasn't well suited for ice hockey and only used sparingly by RPI. Both programs were forced to suspend operations over the next few years due to warm winters that prevented natural ice surfaces from being usable. They renewed their series in 1908, however, Union played just one game over the following two years before shuttering the program for a decade.

After World War I, Union restarted its program and the two eventually began to play annually. Helping the budding rivalry were on-campus rinks that had been built in the interim. While both venues were of the open-air variety, they were a vast improvement over the previous situation. Unfortunately, just as the rivalry was beginning to grow, financial difficulties brought on by The Great Depression caused Rensselaer to suspend its program in 1931. The Engineers attempted to return in the mid-30's but were only able to play 4 total games before having to halt once more. Union continued on in their rival's absence but they too were forced to suspend play after the outbreak of World War II. Once the war was over, the Skating Dutchmen tried to rekindle the program but their poor facilities became an issue. Inconsistent weather conditions wreaked havoc with open-air rinks and it had become apparent that Union could need an enclosed arena if they were to continue playing hockey. After only being able to play a single game in 1949, the program suspended until a permanent solution could be found.

Coincidentally, the following year Rensselaer finally returned to the ice when the Houston Field House was completed. Rensselaer was able to use the new rink to great effect and became a preeminent program for a time. They won the 1954 National Championship under Ned Harkness and were a founding member of ECAC Hockey several years later.

In the mid-70's, after more than 25 years without a game, Union College resurrected its ice hockey program. The completion of the Achilles Rink in 1975 gave the Dutchmen the home they had needed while Harkness set about rebuilding the program from scratch. When Union returned, however, they did so at the Division II level and were able to immediately become a successful team. While there was an expectation that the program would soon make the jump to the top level, school administrators had other ideas. A dispute between Harkness and the college caused the coach to leave mid-way through his third season and set the program back by several years. It would be seven years before the Dutchmen would post another winning record and any rumors about their promotion to Division I were quashed.

in spite of the difficulties for Union, the program was able to restart its rivalry with Rensselaer in 1981. The two played at least one annually over a decade with the Engineers, predictably, dominating the play. When Union finally made the jump to Division I in 1991, they joined the Engineers in ECAC Hockey, where they have remained ever since (as of 2022).

Since becoming conference rivals, the two have played at least twice every year. They have also met several times during the conference postseason. In 2006, the two began jointly hosting the Governor's Cup, a four-team in-season tournament. The series was discontinued after the third edition. The trophy that was used was called the 'Mayor's Cup'. Rather than discard the award, it was used for a new annual game held at the end of January. The first two meetings were at the Herb Brooks Arena before being moved to the MVP Arena in Albany.

== Game results ==
Full game results for the rivalry, with rankings beginning in the 1998–99 season.

Rensselaer victories	Union victories	Tie games

No.	Date	Location	Winning team		Losing team		Notes
1	26 February 1904	Empire Rink; Albany, NY	Rensselaer	6	Union	2	
2	22 February 1908	Empire Rink; Albany, NY	Rensselaer	14	Union	2	
3	22 February 1924	Union Rink; Schenectady, NY	Union	7	Rensselaer	0	
4	10 January 1925	RPI Rink; Troy, NY	Rensselaer	4	Union	0	
5	13 February 1926	RPI Rink; Troy, NY	Rensselaer	3	Union	2	
6	14 January 1928	RPI Rink; Troy, NY	Tie	4	Tie	4	
7	11 February 1928	Central Park Rink; Schenectady, NY	Rensselaer	3	Union	0	
8	14 February 1931	Union Rink; Schenectady, NY	Union	4	Rensselaer	2	
9	19 November 1981	Houston Field House; Troy, NY	Rensselaer	5	Union	4	
10	5 January 1982	Achilles Rink; Schenectady, NY	Rensselaer	3	Union	1	
11	23 November 1982	Houston Field House; Troy, NY	Rensselaer	6	Union	1	
12	18 January 1983	Achilles Rink; Schenectady, NY	Rensselaer	7	Union	4	
13	13 December 1983	Houston Field House; Troy, NY	Rensselaer	9	Union	5	
14	8 January 1985	Achilles Rink; Schenectady, NY	Rensselaer	3	Union	2	(OT)
15	9 November 1985	Houston Field House; Troy, NY	Rensselaer	6	Union	3	
16	8 November 1986	Achilles Rink; Schenectady, NY	Rensselaer	6	Union	1	
17	7 November 1987	Houston Field House; Troy, NY	Rensselaer	13	Union	0	
18	5 November 1988	Achilles Rink; Schenectady, NY	Union	4	Rensselaer	3	(OT)
19	29 December 1989	Houston Field House; Troy, NY	Rensselaer	8	Union	2	
20	28 December 1990	Houston Field House; Troy, NY	Rensselaer	12	Union	2	
21	27 December 1991	Houston Field House; Troy, NY	Rensselaer	6	Union	4	ECAC Play Begins
22	25 January 1992	Achilles Rink; Schenectady, NY	Rensselaer	5	Union	3	
23	11 December 1992	Houston Field House; Troy, NY	Rensselaer	9	Union	3	
24	29 January 1993	Achilles Rink; Schenectady, NY	Rensselaer	8	Union	3	
25	14 January 1994	Achilles Rink; Schenectady, NY	Rensselaer	8	Union	2	
26	15 January 1994	Houston Field House; Troy, NY	Rensselaer	5	Union	3	
27	11 March 1994	Houston Field House; Troy, NY	Union	4	Rensselaer	3	ECAC Hockey Quarterfinal Game 1
28	12 March 1994	Houston Field House; Troy, NY	Rensselaer	5	Union	1	ECAC Hockey Quarterfinal Game 2
29	13 March 1994	Houston Field House; Troy, NY	Rensselaer	8	Union	3	ECAC Hockey Quarterfinal Game 3
30	3 December 1994	Houston Field House; Troy, NY	Rensselaer	4	Union	3	
31	13 January 1995	Achilles Rink; Schenectady, NY	Union	5	Rensselaer	2	
32	20 January 1996	Houston Field House; Troy, NY	Rensselaer	4	Union	2	
33	16 November 1996	Knickerbocker Arena; Albany, NY	Union	2	Rensselaer	0	
34	18 January 1997	Houston Field House; Troy, NY	Rensselaer	5	Union	2	
35	25 January 1997	Achilles Rink; Schenectady, NY	Tie	3	Tie	3	(OT)
36	7 March 1997	Houston Field House; Troy, NY	Rensselaer	3	Union	1	ECAC Hockey Quarterfinal Game 1
37	8 March 1997	Houston Field House; Troy, NY	Rensselaer	3	Union	1	ECAC Hockey Quarterfinal Game 2
38	11 November 1997	Pepsi Arena; Albany, NY	Rensselaer	3	Union	2	
39	17 January 1998	Achilles Rink; Schenectady, NY	Rensselaer	7	Union	2	
40	31 January 1998	Houston Field House; Troy, NY	Tie	3	Tie	3	(OT)
41	6 November 1998	Glens Falls Civic Center; Glens Falls, NY	Rensselaer	3	Union	2	(OT)
42	20 November 1998	Houston Field House; Troy, NY	Union	5	Rensselaer	4	(OT)
43	16 January 1999	Achilles Rink; Schenectady, NY	Rensselaer	4	Union	1	
44	23 October 1999	Glens Falls Civic Center; Glens Falls, NY	Rensselaer	6	Union	3	
45	14 January 2000	Achilles Rink; Schenectady, NY	Union	3	No. 9 Rensselaer	2	(OT)
46	15 January 2000	Houston Field House; Troy, NY	No. 9 Rensselaer	5	Union	0	
47	4 November 2000	Achilles Rink; Schenectady, NY	Union	4	Rensselaer	2	
48	1 December 2000	Houston Field House; Troy, NY	Tie	2	Tie	2	(OT)
49	1 December 2001	Houston Field House; Troy, NY	Tie	1	Tie	1	(OT)
50	16 January 2002	Achilles Rink; Schenectady, NY	Union	5	Rensselaer	4	
51	7 December 2002	Houston Field House; Troy, NY	Rensselaer	4	Union	2	
52	10 January 2003	Achilles Rink; Schenectady, NY	Tie	3	Tie	3	(OT)
53	7 March 2003	Achilles Rink; Schenectady, NY	Rensselaer	2	Union	1	ECAC Hockey First Round Game 1
54	8 March 2003	Achilles Rink; Schenectady, NY	Rensselaer	3	Union	2	ECAC Hockey First Round Game 2
55	9 January 2004	Houston Field House; Troy, NY	Rensselaer	5	Union	1	
56	10 January 2004	Achilles Rink; Schenectady, NY	Rensselaer	3	Union	1	
57	12 November 2004	Houston Field House; Troy, NY	Union	5	Rensselaer	4	
58	13 November 2004	Achilles Rink; Schenectady, NY	Union	3	Rensselaer	2	
59	3 February 2006	Achilles Rink; Schenectady, NY	Union	3	Rensselaer	2	
60	4 February 2006	Houston Field House; Troy, NY	Tie	1	Tie	1	(OT)
61	11 November 2006	Pepsi Arena; Albany, NY	Tie	3	Tie	3	(Rensselaer Shootout Win); Governor's Cup Semifinal
62	30 December 2006	Gutterson Fieldhouse; Burlington, VT	Union	5	Rensselaer	1	Catamount Cup Consolation Game
63	12 January 2007	Houston Field House; Troy, NY	Union	5	Rensselaer	0	
64	13 January 2007	Achilles Rink; Schenectady, NY	Rensselaer	3	Union	2	
65	26 October 2007	Pepsi Arena; Albany, NY	Rensselaer	3	Union	2	Governor's Cup Semifinal
66	18 February 2008	Achilles Rink; Schenectady, NY	Union	2	Rensselaer	1	
67	19 February 2008	Houston Field House; Troy, NY	Union	4	Rensselaer	1	
68	24 October 2008	Pepsi Arena; Albany, NY	Tie	2	Tie	2	(Union Shootout Win); Governor's Cup Semifinal
69	6 February 2009	Houston Field House; Troy, NY	Union	3	Rensselaer	0	
70	7 February 2009	Achilles Rink; Schenectady, NY	Union	2	Rensselaer	1	(OT)
71	30 October 2009	Achilles Rink; Schenectady, NY	Rensselaer	4	Union	3	(OT)
72	28 November 2009	Houston Field House; Troy, NY	Union	5	Rensselaer	4	(OT); Rensselaer Invitational Championship
73	9 December 2009	Houston Field House; Troy, NY	Union	5	Rensselaer	4	
74	16 January 2010	Achilles Rink; Schenectady, NY	Union	3	Rensselaer	1	
75	30 October 2010	Herb Brooks Arena; Lake Placid, NY	Tie	3	Tie	3	(OT); Mayor's Cup series begins
76	12 November 2010	Achilles Rink; Schenectady, NY	No. 12 Union	2	No. 18 Rensselaer	1	
77	13 November 2010	Houston Field House; Troy, NY	No. 18 Rensselaer	4	No. 12 Union	3	(OT)
78	15 November 2011	Houston Field House; Troy, NY	No. 7 Union	5	Rensselaer	1	
79	10 December 2011	Herb Brooks Arena; Lake Placid, NY	No. 10 Union	5	Rensselaer	2	
80	14 January 2012	Achilles Rink; Schenectady, NY	No. 14 Union	5	Rensselaer	1	
81	9 March 2012	Achilles Rink; Schenectady, NY	No. 8 Union	3	Rensselaer	2	ECAC Quarterfinals Round Game 1
82	10 March 2012	Achilles Rink; Schenectady, NY	No. 8 Union	4	Rensselaer	2	ECAC Quarterfinals Round Game 2
83	2 November 2012	Houston Field House; Troy, NY	No. 10 Union	4	Rensselaer	2	
84	3 November 2012	Achilles Rink; Schenectady, NY	No. 10 Union	7	Rensselaer	3	
85	26 January 2013	Times Union Center; Albany, NY	No. 19 Union	3	Rensselaer	2	
86	15 November 2013	Achilles Rink; Schenectady, NY	Union	4	No. 10 Rensselaer	3	
87	16 November 2013	Houston Field House; Troy, NY	Union	4	No. 10 Rensselaer	1	
88	25 January 2014	Times Union Center; Albany, NY	Rensselaer	2	No. 3 Union	1	
89	31 October 2014	Houston Field House; Troy, NY	Rensselaer	6	No. 2 Union	1	
90	1 November 2014	Achilles Rink; Schenectady, NY	Rensselaer	2	No. 2 Union	1	(OT)
91	24 January 2015	Times Union Center; Albany, NY	Union	8	Rensselaer	3	
92	15 November 2015	Achilles Rink; Schenectady, NY	Rensselaer	5	Union	1	
93	16 November 2015	Houston Field House; Troy, NY	Rensselaer	3	Union	2	
94	23 January 2016	Times Union Center; Albany, NY	No. 16 Rensselaer	5	Union	2	
95	28 October 2016	Houston Field House; Troy, NY	Union	4	Rensselaer	1	
96	29 October 2016	Achilles Rink; Schenectady, NY	Union	3	Rensselaer	2	(OT)
97	24 January 2017	Times Union Center; Albany, NY	No. 5 Union	3	Rensselaer	2	(OT)
98	27 October 2017	Achilles Rink; Schenectady, NY	Union	4	Rensselaer	3	
99	28 October 2017	Houston Field House; Troy, NY	Union	4	Rensselaer	2	
100	27 January 2018	Times Union Center; Albany, NY	Union	4	Rensselaer	3	
101	26 October 2018	Houston Field House; Troy, NY	Rensselaer	5	No. 11 Union	3	
102	27 October 2018	Achilles Rink; Schenectady, NY	Rensselaer	4	No. 11 Union	2	(OT)
103	29 January 2019	Times Union Center; Albany, NY	Tie	0	Tie	0	(OT)
104	25 October 2019	Achilles Rink; Schenectady, NY	Rensselaer	3	Union	2	
105	26 October 2019	Houston Field House; Troy, NY	Union	2	Rensselaer	1	
106	25 January 2020	Times Union Center; Albany, NY	Tie	1	Tie	1	(OT)
107	29 October 2021	Achilles Rink; Schenectady, NY	Rensselaer	4	Union	2	
108	30 October 2021	Houston Field House; Troy, NY	Rensselaer	3	Union	0	
109	29 January 2022	Times Union Center; Albany, NY	Union	2	Rensselaer	0	
110	28 October 2022	Achilles Rink; Schenectady, NY	Rensselaer	2	Union	1	
111	29 October 2022	Houston Field House; Troy, NY	Union	6	Rensselaer	0	
112	28 January 2023	MVP Arena; Albany, NY	Union	6	Rensselaer	0	
113	3 November 2023	Achilles Rink; Schenectady, NY	Union	8	Rensselaer	6	
114	4 November 2023	Houston Field House; Troy, NY	Union	5	Rensselaer	1	
115	27 January 2024	MVP Arena; Albany, NY	Union	5	Rensselaer	3	
116	25 October 2024	Houston Field House; Troy, NY	Union	6	Rensselaer	3	
117	26 October 2024	Achilles Rink; Schenectady, NY	Union	4	Rensselaer	3	
118	25 January 2025	MVP Arena, Albany, NY	Union	3	Rensselaer	2	(OT)
119	31 October 2025	M&T Bank Arena; Schenectady, NY	Rensselaer	5	Union	2	
120	1 November 2025	Houston Field House; Troy, NY	Union	3	Rensselaer	0	
121	24 January 2026	MVP Arena, Albany, NY	Union	5	Rensselaer	4	(OT)
122							
Series: Rensselaer leads 57–52–12

== Series facts ==
Statistic	Rensselaer	Union
Games played	111	
Wins	57	52
Home wins	28	23
Road wins	21	18
Neutral site wins	8	11
Goals scored	387	306
Most goals scored in a game by one team	14 (22 February 1908)	8 (24 January 2015)
Most goals in a game by both teams	16 (22 February 1908 – Rensselaer 14, Union 2)	
Fewest goals in a game by both teams	0 (29 January 2019)	
Fewest goals scored in a game by one team in a win	2 (four times)	2 (six times)
Most goals scored in a game by one team in a loss	4 (five times)	5 (13 December 1983)
Largest margin of victory	13 (7 November 1987)	7 (24 February 1924)
Longest winning streak	9 (19 November 1981 – 7 November 1987)	10 (15 November 2011 – 16 November 2013)
