= John Prokop =

American ice hockey player (born 2001)

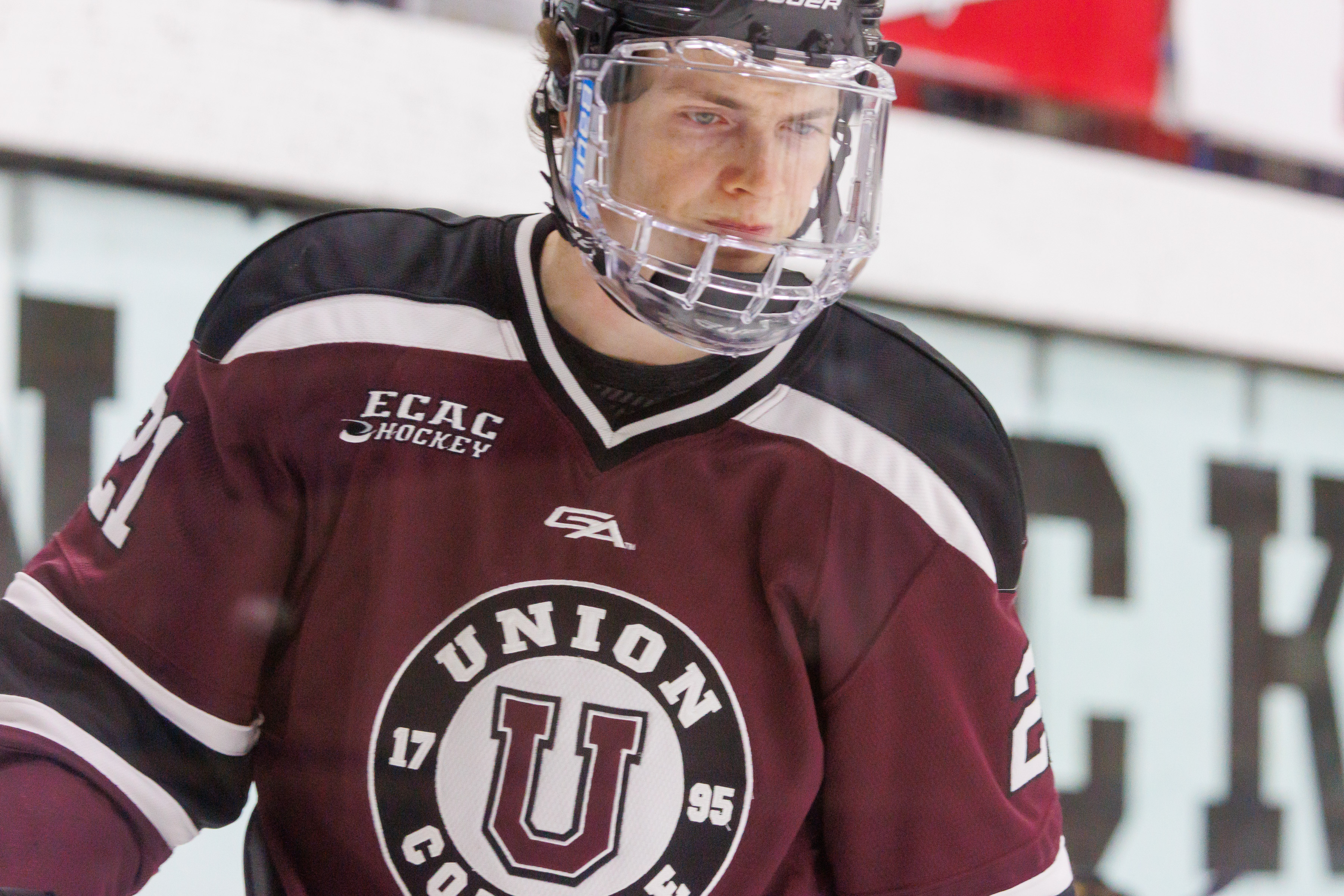
- Prokop in 2023
- Born: May 13, 2001 (age 25) Wausau, Wisconsin, U.S.
- Height: 6 ft 3 in (191 cm)
- Weight: 190 lb (86 kg; 13 st 8 lb)
- Position: Defense
- Shoots: Left
- AHL team (P) Cur. team Former teams: Milwaukee Admirals; Atlanta Gladiators (ECHL); Toronto Marlies
- NHL draft: Undrafted
- Playing career: 2025–present

John Prokop (born May 13, 2001) is an American professional ice hockey defenceman for the Atlanta Gladiators in the ECHL while under contract with the Milwaukee Admirals of the American Hockey League (AHL). He played college ice hockey at Union College.

== Playing career ==
=== Junior ===
Prokop began his junior career with the Omaha Lancers of the United States Hockey League (USHL) during the 2018–19 season, where he recorded four assists in 25 games. During the 2019–20 season, he started the season with the Muskegon Lumberjacks where he recorded one goal and one assist in 11 games. On November 14, 2019, he was traded to the Green Bay Gamblers in exchange for Dylan Wendt. He recorded one goal and six assists in 30 games for the Gamblers. He was named to the 2019 USHL/NHL Top Prospects Game. He then played two seasons for the Des Moines Buccaneers. During the 2020–21 season, he recorded one goal and 11 assists in 46 games. During the 2021–22 season, he recorded one goal and 14 assists in 58 games.

=== College ===
Josh Hauge was an assistant at Clarkson when he began recruiting Prokop. When Hauge was named the head coach at Union prior to the 2022–23 season, Prokop committed to play college ice hockey at Union. During the 2022–23 season, in his freshman year, he was one of six skaters to appear in all 35 games. He recorded a team-high 23 points on four goals and 19 assists. He became the first rookie defenseman in Union's NCAA Division I history to lead the team in points. Following the season he was named to the All-ECAC Rookie Team.

During the 2023–24 season, in his sophomore year, he led the team in scoring with eight goals and 27 assists in 36 games. He recorded one goal and nine assists in six games to lead Union in scoring during November. He recorded three multi-point games and had at least one point in every game in the month. He was subsequently named the ECAC Hockey Defender of the Month for the month of November 2023. During conference play he led the team with six goals and 18 assists for 24 points, and was named a finalist for the ECAC Hockey Player of the Year. Following the season he was named a unanimous All-ECAC First Team honoree and an AHCA East Second Team All-American.

=== Professional ===
On March 20, 2025, Prokop signed a one-year contract with the Toronto Maple Leafs of the NHL, beginning during the 2025–26 season. He was assigned to the Maple Leafs' AHL affiliate, the Toronto Marlies, for the remainder of the 2024–25 season.

As a pending restricted free agent, Prokop was not tendered a qualifying offer by the Maple Leafs and was released as a free agent. On July 20, 2026, Prokop was signed to a one-year, AHL contract with the Milwaukee Admirals, affiliate to the Nashville Predators.

== Career statistics ==
			Regular season					Playoffs
Season	Team	League	GP	G	A	Pts	PIM	GP	G	A	Pts	PIM
2018–19	Omaha Lancers	USHL	25	0	4	4	2	—	—	—	—	—
2018–19	Janesville Jets	NAHL	20	0	7	7	6	3	0	0	0	2
2019–20	Muskegon Lumberjacks	USHL	11	1	1	2	8	—	—	—	—	—
2019–20	Green Bay Gamblers	USHL	30	1	6	7	10	—	—	—	—	—
2020–21	Des Moines Buccaneers	USHL	46	1	11	12	22	—	—	—	—	—
2021–22	Des Moines Buccaneers	USHL	58	1	14	15	28	—	—	—	—	—
2022–23	Union College	ECAC	35	4	19	23	20	—	—	—	—	—
2023–24	Union College	ECAC	36	8	27	35	43	—	—	—	—	—
2024–25	Union College	ECAC	36	8	19	27	20	—	—	—	—	—
2024–25	Toronto Marlies	AHL	3	0	0	0	2	—	—	—	—	—
2025–26	Toronto Marlies	AHL	24	1	2	3	8	—	—	—	—	—
AHL totals			27	1	2	3	10	—	—	—	—	—

== Awards and honors ==
Award	Year
College
All-ECAC Third Team	2025
All-ECAC Rookie Team	2023
All-ECAC First Team	2024
AHCA East Second Team All-American	2024
AHL
Calder Cup champion	2026
