= Josh Hauge =

American ice hockey player and coach

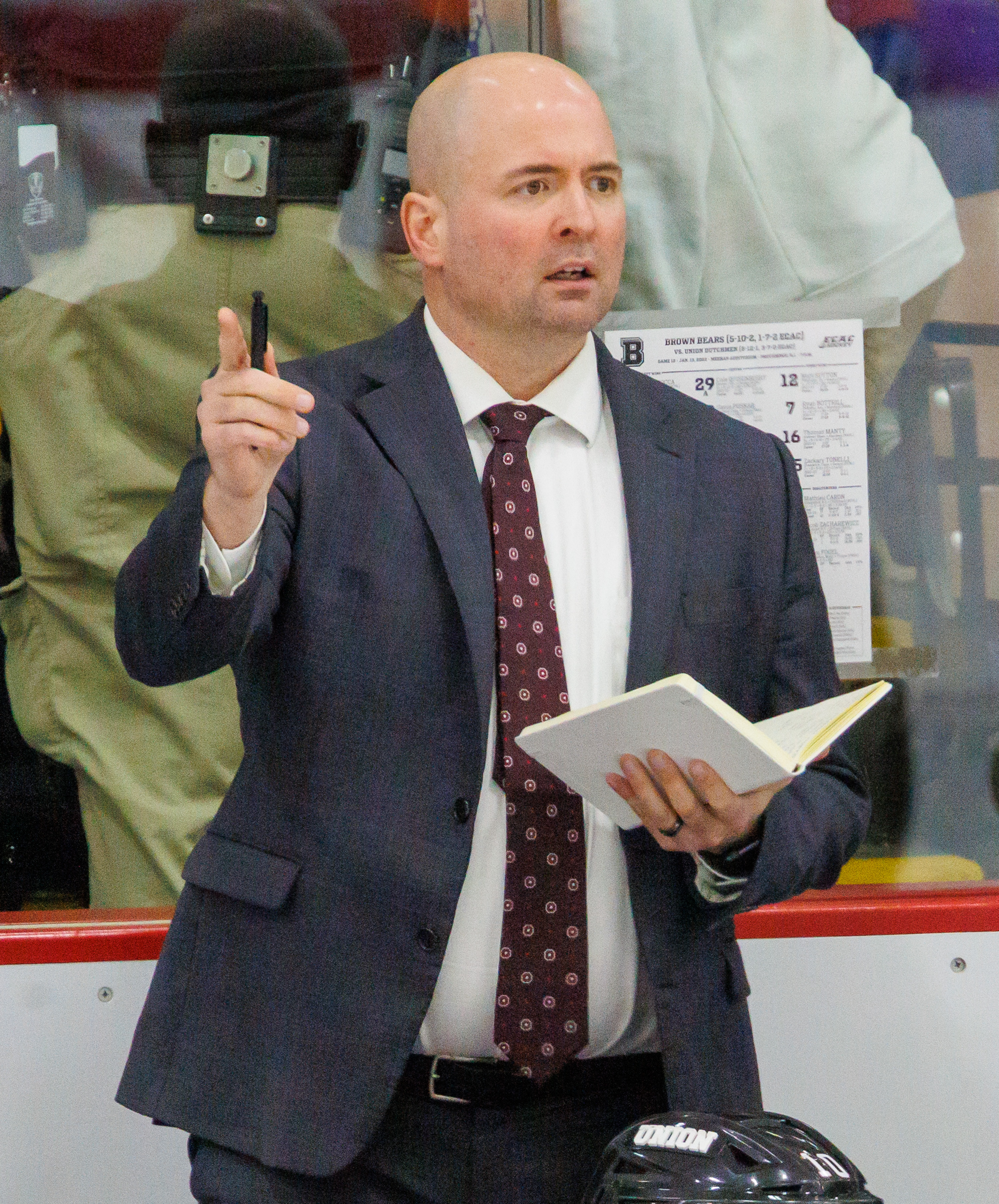

Current position
- Title: Head coach
- Team: Union
- Conference: ECAC Hockey

Biographical details
- Born: April 10, 1979 (age 47); Apple Valley, Minnesota, US
- Education: Bethel University

Playing career
- 1999–2002: Bethel
- Position: Defenseman

Coaching career (HC unless noted)
- 2002–2003: Twin Cities Northern Lights
- 2003–2005: Dubuque Thunderbirds
- 2005–2008: Fairbanks Ice Dogs (asst.)
- 2008–2011: Fairbanks Ice Dogs
- 2011: Tri-City Storm (asst.)
- 2011–2013: Tri-City Storm
- 2014–2015: Fargo Force (asst.)
- 2015–2022: Clarkson (asst.)
- 2022–present: Union

Head coaching record
- Overall: 49–51–8 (.491)

Josh Hauge (born April 10, 1979) is an American ice hockey coach and former player who is currently in charge of the program at Union College.

== Career ==
Hauge played college hockey for Bethel around the turn of the century. He appeared in 76 games for the Royals over three seasons. After graduating in 2002, Hauge ended his playing career and turned to coaching, serving as the head coach for two teams in the Minnesota Junior Hockey League, a Tier III outfit. In 2005 he moved up to Tier II junior hockey as an assistant for the Fairbanks Ice Dogs. Three years later he was promoted to head coach and led his team on several deep playoff runs. After finishing as the runners-up in 2010, Hauge led the Ice Dogs to the championship in 2011.

With a league title in his back pocket, Hauge was again on the move, this time up to the Tier I level. He began the 2012 season as an assistant for the Tri-City Storm but, after a 6–15 start, he was installed as the interim head coach. The team finished with a winning record under Hauge and managed to make the postseason. The next year, now as the Storms' full-time coach, Hauge was unable to get a repeat performance out of his team and they finished with the worst record in their conference. While he was brought back for a third season, Tri-City started 4–9–2 and he was relieved of his duties.

Hauge remained in the USHL for another year as an assistant before making the jump to the college ranks. He joined Casey Jones' staff at Clarkson and help the program improve steadily over several seasons. In 2019, the Golden Knights won the ECAC tournament for the first time in 12 years and, partly as a result, Hauge was promoted to associate head coach. COVID-19 severely impacted the team over the next two seasons but Clarkson remained one of the top programs in their conference. In 2022, Union began a search for a head coach to replace the departed Rick Bennett, who had resigned under a cloud. The athletic department brought Hauge in as the program's 22nd head coach.

== Head coaching record ==
=== Junior ===
Team	Year	Regular season						Postseason			
Team	Year	Games	Won	Lost	OTL	Points	Finish	Games	Won	Lost	Result
Fairbanks Ice Dogs	2008–09	58	38	12	8	86	1st in West	7	4	3	Lost in Round 2
Fairbanks Ice Dogs	2009–10	58	32	22	4	86	3rd in West	10	5	5	Lost Finals
Fairbanks Ice Dogs	2010–11	58	40	15	3	83	1st in West	10	9	1	Won Robertson Cup
Tri-City Storm ^{†}	2011–12	39	20	18	1	103	6th in Western	2	0	2	Lost in Round 1
Tri-City Storm	2012–13	64	22	35	7	51	8th in Western	—	—	—	—
Tri-City Storm ^{‡}	2013–14	15	4	9	2	10	—	—	—	—	—
NAHL Totals		174	110	49	15	—	—	27	18	9	—
USHL Totals		118	46	62	10	—	—	2	0	2	—

† Mid-season replacement
‡ Replaced mid-season

=== College ===
Record table
Season	Team	Overall	Conference	Standing	Postseason
Union Dutchmen (ECAC Hockey) (2022–2023)
2022–23	Union	14–19–2	8–13–1	T–7th	ECAC First Round
Union Garnet Chargers (ECAC Hockey) (2023–present)
2023–24	Union	16–18–3	9–10–3	5th	ECAC Quarterfinals
2024–25	Union	19–14–3	12–8–2	4th	ECAC Quarterfinals
Union:		49–51–8 (.491)	29–35–6 (.457)		
Total:		49–51–8 (.491)			
National champion Postseason invitational champion Conference regular season champion Conference regular season and conference tournament champion Division regular season champion Division regular season and conference tournament champion Conference tournament champion
