= John Ronan (ice hockey) =

American ice hockey coach

Current position
- Title: Assistant coach
- Team: Union
- Conference: ECAC Hockey

Biographical details
- Born: July 6, 1980 (age 46); South Boston, Massachusetts, U.S.
- Education: University of Maine

Playing career
- 2001–2005: Maine
- 2004–2005: Alaska Aces
- 2005–2006: Florida Everblades
- 2006–2007: Rocky Mountain Rage
- 2006–2008: Austin Ice Bats
- 2008–2009: Huntsville Havoc
- 2009–2010: Flint Generals
- 2010–2011: Eaters Limburg
- 2011–2012: Evansville Icemen
- Position: Forward

Coaching career (HC unless noted)
- 2013–2014: Union (volunteer asst.)
- 2014–2015: Youngstown Phantoms (asst.)
- 2015–2016: Mercyhurst (asst.)
- 2016–2022: Union (asst.)
- 2022: Union (interim)
- 2022–present: Union (asst.)

Head coaching record
- Overall: 8–8–1 .500

John Ronan (born July 6, 1980) is an American ice hockey coach and former forward, who is currently an assistant coach for the Union Garnet Chargers.

== Career ==
Ronan was a four-year player at Maine. As a two-way forward, he helped the Black Bears reach the championship game in 2004 and was lauded by his coach for inspiring the team to victory after finding themselves down 1–4 to Harvard. Ronan played professionally for several years, mostly in the lower North American leagues, but did spend a season in the Dutch Premier League shortly before his retirement.

Ronan returned to Maine to finish his degree in 2013 and then worked as a volunteer assistant at Union during the Dutchmen's national championship run. The following year he became a full time assistant in the USHL before returning to the college ranks and eventually wound up back at Union. He remained as an assistant under Rick Bennett until his former boss was suspended in January 2022 after allegations of improper coaching conduct. Ronan was made the interim head coach and remained in that position after Bennett's resignation a week later. Ronan led the team to an 8–8–1 finish.

After the season, Union decided to name Josh Hauge as the new head coach, however, Ronan was retained as an assistant with the Dutchmen.

== Head coaching record ==
Record table
Season	Team	Overall	Conference	Standing	Postseason
Union Dutchmen (ECAC Hockey) (2022–present)
2021–22	Union	8–8–1^{†}	5–5–1^{†}	7th	ECAC Quarterfinals
Union:		8–8–1	5–5–1		
Total:					
National champion Postseason invitational champion Conference regular season champion Conference regular season and conference tournament champion Division regular season champion Division regular season and conference tournament champion Conference tournament champion

† mid-season replacement
