= 2021–22 ECAC Hockey men's season =

- Season: 2021–22
- Conference: ECAC Hockey
- Division: Division I
- Sport: men's ice hockey
- Duration: October 2, 2021– March 27, 2022
- Number of teams: 12

2022 NHL Entry Draft
- Top draft pick: Zakary Karpa
- Picked by: New York Rangers

Regular Season
- Season champions: Quinnipiac
- Season MVP: Yaniv Perets
- Top scorer: Alexander Campbell

ECAC Hockey tournament
- Tournament champions: Harvard
- Runners-up: Quinnipiac
- Tournament MVP: Matthew Coronato
- Top scorer: Matthew Coronato (10)

NCAA tournament
- Bids: 2
- Record: 1–2
- Best Finish: Regional Final
- Team(s): Quinnipiac

The 2021–22 ECAC Hockey men's season is the 61st season of play for ECAC Hockey and will take place during the 2021–22 NCAA Division I men's ice hockey season. The regular season is set to begin on October 2, 2021, and conclude on February 26, 2022. The conference tournament is scheduled to begin in early March, 2022.

== Season ==
While the conference was active during the 2020–21 season, eight of the twelve member teams had cancelled their campaigns as a result of the ongoing COVID-19 pandemic. The six Ivy League schools were joined by the two capital district programs in not playing but all schools committed to start the 2021–22 season on time.

== Coaches ==
Reid Cashman was hired on June 1, 2020, however, due to the COVID-19 pandemic this is his first season behind the bench for Dartmouth.

=== Records ===
Team	Head coach	Season at school	Record at school	ECAC Hockey record
Brown	Brendan Whittet	12	107–203–46	68–139–35
Clarkson	Casey Jones	11	179–142–45	89–73–28
Colgate	Don Vaughan	29	435–470–114	264–269–77
Cornell	Mike Schafer	26	458–259–95	298–156–74
Dartmouth	Reid Cashman	1	0–0–0	0–0–0
Harvard	Ted Donato	17	253–221–61	167–143–53
Princeton	Ron Fogarty	7	59–113–21	33–83–16
Quinnipiac	Rand Pecknold	28	549–326–97	183–115–50
Rensselaer	Dave Smith	4	33–65–9	24–37–5
St. Lawrence	Brent Brekke	3	10–35–8	6–26–5
Union	Rick Bennett	10	186–122–42	103–72–23
Yale	Keith Allain	15	250–174–44	167–121–28

== Standings ==
2021–22 ECAC Hockey Standings
	Conference record										Overall record					
	GP	W	L	T	OTW	OTL	3/SW	PTS	GF	GA	GP	W	L	T	GF	GA
#8 Quinnipiac †	22	17	4	1	0	1	1	54	71	14	42	32	7	3	139	53
#17 Clarkson	22	14	4	4	0	2	3	51	86	47	37	21	10	6	123	85
#15 Harvard *	22	14	6	2	0	0	2	46	69	46	35	21	11	3	116	82
Cornell	22	12	6	4	2	1	0	39	73	47	32	18	10	4	100	72
Colgate	22	9	9	4	1	0	3	33	55	57	40	18	18	4	111	112
Rensselaer	22	10	12	0	0	0	0	30	58	63	44	18	23	3	114	119
Union	22	9	11	2	3	1	0	27	52	66	37	14	19	4	89	110
St. Lawrence	22	7	10	5	2	0	2	26	44	60	37	11	19	7	72	110
Brown	22	6	12	4	0	1	2	25	36	61	31	7	20	4	50	100
Princeton	22	7	14	1	0	1	0	23	54	89	31	8	21	2	70	122
Yale	22	7	14	1	3	1	1	21	38	60	30	8	21	1	55	90
Dartmouth	22	5	15	2	0	3	1	21	45	71	32	7	22	3	69	110
Championship: March 19, 2022 † indicates conference regular season champion (Cleary Cup) * indicates conference tournament champion (Whitelaw Cup); Rankings: USCHO.com Top 20 Poll

== Non-Conference record ==
Of the sixteen teams that are selected to participate in the NCAA tournament, ten will be via at-large bids. Those 10 teams are determined based upon the PairWise rankings. The rankings take into account all games played but are heavily affected by intra-conference results. The result is that teams from leagues which perform better in non-conference are much more likely to receive at-large bids even if they possess inferior records overall.

ECAC Hockey had a very poor non-conference record. While the overall record wasn't awful, the league wasn't able to post a winning record against any other conference. Out of twelve members, just two finished with winning records while half of the member teams couldn't get above .250. While the conference, somewhat miraculously, posted a decent mark against NCHC, that wasn't nearly enough to salvage their collective rankings.

=== Regular season record ===
Team	Atlantic Hockey	Big Ten	CCHA	Hockey East	Independent	NCHC	Total
Brown	0–1–0	0–0–0	0–0–0	0–4–0	0–1–0	0–0–0	0–6–0
Clarkson	0–0–1	1–0–1	1–1–0	0–1–0	3–3–0	0–0–0	5–5–2
Colgate	1–0–0	0–0–0	0–2–0	3–2–0	1–1–0	0–2–0	5–7–0
Cornell	0–0–0	0–0–0	0–0–0	1–0–0	2–2–0	2–0–0	5–2–0
Dartmouth	0–0–0	0–0–0	0–0–0	1–5–1	0–0–0	0–0–0	1–5–1
Harvard	1–0–0	0–0–0	0–0–0	2–3–1	0–0–0	0–0–0	3–3–1
Princeton	0–3–0	0–0–0	0–0–0	0–2–0	1–0–1	0–0–0	1–5–1
Quinnipiac	3–0–1	0–0–0	0–0–0	3–0–1	4–0–0	1–1–0	11–1–2
Rensselaer	1–1–1	0–0–0	0–1–1	1–2–0	2–3–1	0–0–0	4–7–3
St. Lawrence	0–1–0	0–0–0	0–1–1	0–1–0	0–0–0	2–3–1	2–6–2
Union	0–0–0	0–0–0	0–2–0	1–3–1	0–1–0	1–0–1	2–6–2
Yale	0–2–0	0–1–0	0–1–0	1–1–0	0–0–0	0–0–0	1–5–0
Overall	6–8–3	1–1–1	1–8–2	13–24–4	13–11–2	6–6–2	40–58–14

== Statistics ==
=== Leading scorers ===
GP = Games played; G = Goals; A = Assists; Pts = Points; PIM = Penalty minutes

Player	Class	Team	GP	G	A	Pts	PIM
Alexander Campbell	Sophomore	Clarkson	27	14	15	29	4
Mathieu Gosselin	Junior	Clarkson	27	8	19	27	33
Matt Steinburg	Junior	Cornell	21	12	13	25	24
Matthew Coronato	Freshman	Harvard	24	13	12	25	14
Brandon Estes	Graduate	Union	27	4	19	23	10
Zach Tsekos	Graduate	Clarkson	24	13	10	23	6
Anthony Romano	Junior	Clarkson	27	12	11	23	4
Nick Abruzzese	Junior	Harvard	20	7	16	23	6
Jack Jacome	Graduate	Clarkson	26	2	20	22	20
Wyatt Bongiovanni	Senior	Quinnipiac	27	9	12	21	39

=== Leading goaltenders ===
Minimum 1/3 of team's minutes played in conference games.
GP = Games played; Min = Minutes played; W = Wins; L = Losses; T = Ties; GA = Goals against; SO = Shutouts; SV% = Save percentage; GAA = Goals against average

Player	Class	Team	GP	Min	W	L	T	GA	SO	SV%	GAA
Yaniv Perets	Sophomore	Quinnipiac	22	1333	13	4	1	18	9	.956	0.81
Ian Shane	Freshman	Cornell	12	696	4	4	3	18	3	.939	1.55
Mitchell Gibson	Junior	Harvard	20	1125	11	5	1	35	3	.928	1.87
Jack Watson	Freshman	Rensselaer	13	562	5	4	0	21	3	.929	2.24
Emil Zetterquist	Senior	St. Lawrence	24	1389	7	8	5	52	0	.916	2.25

== ECAC tournament ==
First round March 4–6
5	Colgate	3*	5	-
12	Yale	2	1	-
6	Rensselaer	2	3	5
11	Dartmouth	3	2	3
7	Union	3	5	-
10	Princeton	2	1	-
8	St. Lawrence	4	1	4*
9	Brown	1	2*	3

Quarterfinals; March 11–13
1	Quinnipiac	4	4**	-
8	St. Lawrence	1	3	-
2	Clarkson	3*	4*	-
7	Union	2	3	-
3	Harvard	4*	3	3
6	Rensselaer	3	4**	1
4	Cornell	3	2	1
5	Colgate	1	4	2

Semifinals; March 18
1	Quinnipiac	3
5	Colgate	1
2	Clarkson	3
3	Harvard	5

Championship; March 19
1	Quinnipiac	2
3	Harvard	3*

Note: * denotes overtime periods

== NCAA tournament ==
=== Regional semifinal ===
==== Midwest ====
March 25, 2022; 8:00 PM	(2) Quinnipiac	5 – 4 (2–0, 1–3, 2–1)	(3) St. Cloud State	PPL Center; Attendance: 2,155

Game reference

Yaniv Perets
Goalies
Jaxon Castor
Referees:
Ryan Sweeney
Mike Schubert
Linesmen:
Anthony Valle
Shane Kanaly

(Metsa, Brind'Amour) Brendan Less (4) – 04:37	1–0
(Rasanen) TJ Friedmann (10) – 17:26	2–0
	2–1	21:08 – Nolan Walker (10) (Hentges)
	2–2	27:21 – Sam Hentges (12) (Walker)
(de Jong, Metsa) Michael Lombardi (14) – 30:12	3–2
	3–3	32:39 – Kyler Kupka (19) (Bushy, Fitzgerald)
(Mendel, Chorney) Ethan de Jong (11) – 40:27	4–3
(Mendel, de Jong) Jayden Lee (5) – GW – 48:37	5–3
	5–4	58:44 – EA – Nolan Walker (19) (unassisted)

2 min
Penalties
0 min
16
Shots
34

==== East ====
March 24, 2022; 12:00 PM	(1) Minnesota State	4 – 3 (2–0, 1–2, 1–1)	(4) Harvard	MVP Arena; Attendance: 2,345

Game reference

Dryden McKay
Goalies
Mitchell Gibson
Referees:
Joe Sullivan
Dan Dreger
Linesmen:
Justin Hills
Geoff Shultz

(Hirose, Groll) Connor Gregga (6) – 14:12	1–0
(Hirose) Reggie Lutz (14) – PP – 17:46	2–0
(unassisted) Brendan Furry (12) – 22:06	3–0
	3–1	36:42 – Sean Farrell (11) (Coronato, Abruzzese)
	3–2	37:30 – Alex Gaffney (8) (Laferriere)
(Groll, Hirose) Ondřej Pavel (11) – GW – 45:59	4–2
	4–3	56:29 – PP EA – Casey Dornbach (9) (Farrell, Laferriere)

4 min
Penalties
6 min
40
Shots
22

=== Regional final ===
==== Midwest ====
March 27, 2022; 6:30 PM	(1) Michigan	7 – 4 (2–0, 2–0, 3–4)	(2) Quinnipiac	PPL Center; Attendance: 3,256

Game reference

Erik Portillo
Goalies
Yaniv Perets out 40:00
Dylan St. Cyr in 40:00
Referees:
Geoff Miller
Steve Rouillard
Linesmen:
Jeff McCorkle
Kyle Richetelle

(Power, Lambert) Nolan Moyle (6) – 00:33	1–0
(Hughes) Jimmy Lambert (5) – 14:36	2–0
(Brisson, Power) Thomas Bordeleau (11) – PP – 26:06	3–0
(Blankenburg) Garrett Van Wyhe (6) – SH – 38:54	4–0
	4–1	44:12 – Jayden Lee (6) (Brind'Amour, van Nes)
	4–2	49:01 – Wyatt Bongiovanni (16) (de Jong)
	4–3	51:02 – Desi Burgart (8) (Smilanic, Quillan)
(Bordeleau, Estapa) Michael Pastujov (11) – GW EN – 56:23	5–3
(Power) Nolan Moyle (7) – EN – 58:37	6–3
(Bordeleau, Power) Brendan Brisson (21) – PP – 59:25	7–3
	7–4	59:38 – Zach Metsa (10) (Quillan, Leyh)

6 min
Penalties
4 min
30
Shots
34

== Ranking ==
=== USCHO ===
Team	Pre	1	2	3	4	5	6	7	8	9	10	11	12	13	14	15	16	17	18	19	20	21	22	23	Final
Brown	NR	NR	NR	NR	NR	NR	NR	NR	NR	NR	NR	NR	NR	NR	NR	NR	NR	NR	NR	NR	NR	NR	NR	NR	NR
Clarkson	19	20	NR	NR	NR	NR	NR	NR	NR	19	18	NR	NR	NR	NR	NR	20	19	15	17	18	17	14	17	17
Colgate	NR	NR	NR	NR	NR	NR	NR	NR	NR	NR	NR	NR	NR	NR	NR	NR	NR	NR	NR	NR	NR	NR	NR	NR	NR
Cornell	15	16	15	15	16	15	13	10	10	9	9	9	14	9	8	8	11	16	18	18	17	18	NR	NR	NR
Dartmouth	NR	NR	NR	NR	NR	NR	NR	NR	NR	NR	NR	NR	NR	NR	NR	NR	NR	NR	NR	NR	NR	NR	NR	NR	NR
Harvard	16	14	14	14	15	13	10	16	16	17	20	19	19	18	20	NR	NR	NR	NR	NR	NR	NR	17	15	15
Princeton	NR	NR	NR	NR	NR	NR	NR	NR	NR	NR	NR	NR	NR	NR	NR	NR	NR	NR	NR	NR	NR	NR	NR	NR	NR
Quinnipiac	9	9	8	7	5	6	5	5	3	4	2	2	2	2	1	2	2	2	4	5	6	6	6	8	7
Rensselaer	NR	NR	NR	NR	NR	NR	NR	NR	NR	NR	NR	NR	NR	NR	NR	NR	NR	NR	NR	NR	NR	NR	NR	NR	NR
St. Lawrence	NR	NR	NR	NR	NR	NR	NR	NR	NR	NR	NR	NR	NR	NR	NR	NR	NR	NR	NR	NR	NR	NR	NR	NR	NR
Union	NR	NR	NR	NR	NR	NR	NR	NR	NR	NR	NR	NR	NR	NR	NR	NR	NR	NR	NR	NR	NR	NR	NR	NR	NR
Yale	NR	NR	NR	NR	NR	NR	NR	NR	NR	NR	NR	NR	NR	NR	NR	NR	NR	NR	NR	NR	NR	NR	NR	NR	NR

=== USA Today ===
Team	Pre	1	2	3	4	5	6	7	8	9	10	11	12	13	14	15	16	17	18	19	20	21	22	23	24	Final
Brown	NR	NR	NR	NR	NR	NR	NR	NR	NR	NR	NR	NR	NR	NR	NR	NR	NR	NR	NR	NR	NR	NR	NR	NR	NR	NR
Clarkson	NR	NR	NR	NR	NR	NR	NR	NR	NR	NR	NR	NR	NR	NR	NR	NR	NR	NR	15	NR	NR	NR	15	NR	NR	NR
Colgate	NR	NR	NR	NR	NR	NR	NR	NR	NR	NR	NR	NR	NR	NR	NR	NR	NR	NR	NR	NR	NR	NR	NR	NR	NR	NR
Cornell	13	NR	13	15	15	14	12	9	10	9	9	9	14	10	8	9	13	15	NR	NR	NR	NR	NR	NR	NR	NR
Dartmouth	NR	NR	NR	NR	NR	NR	NR	NR	NR	NR	NR	NR	NR	NR	NR	NR	NR	NR	NR	NR	NR	NR	NR	NR	NR	NR
Harvard	11	12	12	13	14	9	6	14	15	NR	NR	NR	NR	NR	NR	NR	NR	NR	NR	NR	NR	NR	NR	15	15	15
Princeton	NR	NR	NR	NR	NR	NR	NR	NR	NR	NR	NR	NR	NR	NR	NR	NR	NR	NR	NR	NR	NR	NR	NR	NR	NR	NR
Quinnipiac	9	9	8	7	5	6	5	5	4	4	2	2	2	2	1	2	2	2	4	5	6	6	6	7	7	7
Rensselaer	NR	NR	NR	NR	NR	NR	NR	NR	NR	NR	NR	NR	NR	NR	NR	NR	NR	NR	NR	NR	NR	NR	NR	NR	NR	NR
St. Lawrence	NR	NR	NR	NR	NR	NR	NR	NR	NR	NR	NR	NR	NR	NR	NR	NR	NR	NR	NR	NR	NR	NR	NR	NR	NR	NR
Union	NR	NR	NR	NR	NR	NR	NR	NR	NR	NR	NR	NR	NR	NR	NR	NR	NR	NR	NR	NR	NR	NR	NR	NR	NR	NR
Yale	NR	NR	NR	NR	NR	NR	NR	NR	NR	NR	NR	NR	NR	NR	NR	NR	NR	NR	NR	NR	NR	NR	NR	NR	NR	NR

=== Pairwise ===
Team	1	2	3	4	5	6	7	8	9	10	11	12	13	14	15	16	17	18	19	20	21	22	Final
Brown	14	49	54	54	57	57	56	54	57	50	52	56	55	55	53	57	54	54	56	57	57	57	57
Clarkson	14	41	36	15	17	28	16	13	14	13	22	21	25	21	21	18	18	14	17	16	16	16	16
Colgate	6	3	18	12	24	26	35	28	32	41	41	39	44	43	40	44	41	38	39	34	33	31	31
Cornell	14	49	54	54	45	24	18	23	20	18	19	26	14	11	18	18	24	24	23	21	22	22	23
Dartmouth	14	49	54	54	54	43	42	45	50	56	55	50	50	50	51	52	57	56	54	55	55	54	54
Harvard	14	49	54	54	5	4	14	17	25	27	27	24	21	25	25	28	23	23	23	23	22	22	17
Princeton	14	49	54	54	58	40	28	43	48	49	49	50	51	50	48	46	46	44	48	53	56	56	56
Quinnipiac	14	5	12	17	27	16	6	9	8	7	6	7	6	4	7	6	5	5	6	8	8	6	8
Rensselaer	14	45	17	9	12	25	32	28	38	36	36	37	39	41	40	43	44	42	41	41	42	41	41
St. Lawrence	14	33	47	39	40	29	32	31	37	36	39	42	42	43	47	45	45	49	49	50	47	48	48
Union	14	49	48	49	53	47	51	48	44	46	45	46	47	43	46	41	41	47	49	47	45	47	46
Yale	14	49	54	54	59	59	59	59	59	59	59	59	59	57	54	55	56	57	57	56	58	58	58

Note: teams ranked in the top-10 automatically qualify for the NCAA tournament. Teams ranked 11-16 can qualify based upon conference tournament results.

== Awards ==
=== NCAA ===
AHCA All-American Teams
East First Team	Position	Team
Zach Metsa	D	Quinnipiac
Nick Abruzzese	F	Harvard
East Second Team	Position	Team
Yaniv Perets	G	Quinnipiac
Henry Thrun	D	Harvard

=== ECAC Hockey ===
Award		Recipient
Player of the Year		Yaniv Perets, Quinnipiac
Best Defensive Forward		Zach Teskos, Clarkson
Best Defensive Defenseman		Zach Metsa, Quinnipiac
Rookie of the Year		Alex Laferriere, Harvard
Ken Dryden Award		Yaniv Perets, Quinnipiac
Student-Athlete of the Year		Josh Kosack, Union
Tim Taylor Award		Rand Pecknold, Quinnipiac
Most Outstanding Player in Tournament		Matthew Coronato, Harvard
All-ECAC Hockey Teams
First Team	Position	Second Team
Yaniv Perets, Quinnipiac	G	Mitchell Gibson, Harvard
Zach Metsa, Quinnipiac	D	Noah Beck, Clarkson
Sam Malinski, Cornell	D	Henry Thrun, Harvard
Alex Campbell, Clarkson	F	Zach Tsekos, Clarkson
Mathieu Gosselin, Clarkson	F	Ture Linden, Rensselaer
Nick Abruzzese, Harvard	F	Matt Stienburg, Cornell
Third Team	Position	Rookie Team
Clay Stevenson, Dartmouth	G	Clay Stevenson, Dartmouth
Brandon Estes, Union	D	Ian Moore, Harvard
Lukas Kälble, Clarkson	D	Hank Kempf, Cornell
Alex Laferriere, Harvard	F	Alex Laferriere, Harvard
Max Andreev, Cornell	F	Ayrton Martino, Clarkson
Wyatt Bongiovanni, Quinnipiac	F	Matthew Coronato, Harvard

=== ECAC Hockey tournament ===
Tournament MOP
Matthew Coronato	Harvard

== 2022 NHL entry draft ==
Round	Pick	Player	College	NHL team
3	76	Michael Fisher^{†}	Princeton	San Jose Sharks
3	83	George Fegaras^{†}	Cornell	Dallas Stars
3	91	Ben MacDonald^{†}	Harvard	Seattle Kraken
4	111	Noah Laba^{†}	Colgate	New York Rangers
4	112	Daimon Gardner^{†}	Clarkson	Vancouver Canucks
4	121	Ryan Healey^{†}	Harvard	Minnesota Wild
5	131	Matthew Morden^{†}	Harvard	Arizona Coyotes
5	154	Michael Callow^{†}	Harvard	Anaheim Ducks
6	162	Emmett Croteau^{†}	Clarkson	Montreal Canadiens
6	169	Jared Wright^{†}	Colgate	Los Angeles Kings
6	182	Luke Devlin^{†}	Cornell	Pittsburgh Penguins
6	191	Zakary Karpa	Harvard	New York Rangers

† incoming freshman
