= 2021–22 Brown Bears men's ice hockey season =

Ice hockey season

- Conference: 9th ECAC Hockey
- Home ice: Meehan Auditorium

Rankings
- USCHO: NR
- USA Today: NR

Record
- Overall: 7–20–4
- Conference: 6–12–4
- Home: 4–8–3
- Road: 3–12–1

Coaches and captains
- Head coach: Brendan Whittet
- Assistant coaches: Jason Guerriero; Jason Smith; Ed Kesell
- Captain: Tristan Crozier
- Alternate captain: Luke Kania

The 2021–22 Brown Bears Men's ice hockey season was the 104th season of play for the program and the 60th in the ECAC Hockey conference. The Bears represented Brown University and were coached by Brendan Whittet, in his 12th season.

== Season ==
Brown's return to the ice after losing the entire 20–21 season due to the COVID-19 pandemic began well with Luke Kania posting a shutout in the opening match. Afterwards, the Bears took a sharp turn downwards and lost seven straight games. In the stretch neither Kania nor freshman Mathieu Caron played particularly well but the later did perform better overall so the team began to lean more towards Caron as the starter. The biggest problem for Brown was their woeful offense that was shutout in three of those games and would remain inadequate for the remainder of the season.

In early December, Brown finally ended its losing streak when Caron posted back-to-back shutouts with the first coming in surprise fashion against Harvard, a team that would eventually make the NCAA tournament. The short winning streak ended shortly thereafter and the team tried to turn back to Kania but the results were very poor.

An uptick in the number of positive COVID-19 tests in January caused several of Brown's games to be postponed. When they finally got back onto the ice later in the month, Brendan Whittet had settled on Caron as the team's starter and he kept the team in several games, giving them multiple chances to post victories. In their final 14 games, Brown went 3–7–4, a poor record but good enough to get the Bears out of the conference cellar.

The Bears ended the year in 9th place and set them up against St. Lawrence in the First Round of the conference tournament. After losing the first game, Brown fought back to tie the series with an overtime victory and then built a 3–1 lead midway through the deciding match. Unfortunately, the Bears couldn't hold the advantage and after the Saints tied the game things looked bleak for the Brunos. While the game went into overtime, Brown had not scored more than three goals all season. To continue their campaign, the offense would have to rise to the occasion. However, before the Bears had a chance to generate any opportunities, St. Lawrence scored on the first shot of the extra period and ended Brown's season.

== Departures ==
| Player | Position | Nationality | Cause |
|---|---|---|---|
| Christopher Berger | Forward | United States | Graduate transfer to Michigan State |
| Colin Burston | Forward | United States | Graduation (retired) |
| Anea Ferrario | Defenseman | United States | Graduation (retired) |
| Alec Mehr | Forward | United States | Graduation (retired) |
| Tony Stillwell | Defenseman | United States | Graduate transfer to Quinnipiac |
| Ben Taylor | Forward | United States | Graduation (retired) |
| Joachim Weberg | Forward | Norway | Graduation (retired) |

== Recruiting ==
| Player | Position | Nationality | Age | Notes |
|---|---|---|---|---|
| Brett Bliss | Defenseman | United States | 19 | Chelmsford, MA |
| Mathieu Caron | Goaltender | Canada | 21 | Abbotsford, BC |
| Brendan Clark | Forward | United States | 19 | Morris Plains, NJ |
| Spencer Evans | Defenseman | United States | 19 | Oyster Bay, NY |
| Lynden Grandberg | Forward | Canada | 20 | Calgary, AB |
| Thomas Manty | Forward | United States | 21 | Andover, MA |
| Wyatt Schlaht | Forward | United States | 21 | Denver, CO |
| Noah Wakeford | Forward | Canada | 21 | Okotoks, AB |

== Roster ==
As of August 19, 2021.

| No. | Nat. | Player | Class | Pos | Height | Weight | DoB | Hometown | Previous team | NHL rights |
|---|---|---|---|---|---|---|---|---|---|---|
| 1 | (United States) | James Durham | Sophomore | G | 6' 2" (1.88 m) | 195 lb (88 kg) | 1999-03-27 | Grand Rapids, Michigan | Des Moines Buccaneers (USHL) | — |
| 2 | (United States) | Luke Krys | Junior | D | 6' 2" (1.88 m) | 185 lb (84 kg) | 2000-09-27 | Ridgefield, Connecticut | Muskegon Lumberjacks (USHL) | — |
| 3 | (Canada) | Luke Albert | Junior | D | 6' 2" (1.88 m) | 201 lb (91 kg) | 1998-08-17 | Fergus, Ontario | Bonnyville Pontiacs (AJHL) | — |
| 4 | (United States) | Brett Bliss | Freshman | D | 6' 2" (1.88 m) | 190 lb (86 kg) | 2001-12-29 | Chelmsford, Massachusetts | Surrey Eagles (BCHL) | — |
| 7 | (United States) | Justin Jallen | Junior | F | 5' 9" (1.75 m) | 178 lb (81 kg) | 1998-01-06 | St. Paul, Minnesota | Northeast Generals (NAHL) | — |
| 8 | (United States) | Thomas Manty | Freshman | F | 5' 10" (1.78 m) | 175 lb (79 kg) | 2000-02-04 | Andover, Massachusetts | Aberdeen Wings (NAHL) | — |
| 9 | (United States) | Connor Marshall | Junior | F | 5' 11" (1.8 m) | 185 lb (84 kg) | 1998-10-10 | Parkland, Florida | Northeast Generals (NAHL) | — |
| 10 | (United States) | Jonny Russell | Junior | F | 5' 11" (1.8 m) | 173 lb (78 kg) | 1998-01-31 | Traverse City, Michigan | Des Moines Buccaneers (USHL) | — |
| 11 | (Canada) | Nathan Plessis | Junior | F | 6' 4" (1.93 m) | 205 lb (93 kg) | 1998-02-28 | Salmon Arm, British Columbia | Brooks Bandits (AJHL) | — |
| 12 | (United States) | Matt Sutton | Sophomore | F | 5' 11" (1.8 m) | 185 lb (84 kg) | 2001-05-26 | Pittsburgh, Pennsylvania | Omaha Lancers (USHL) | — |
| 13 | (Canada) | Lynden Grandberg | Freshman | F | 6' 0" (1.83 m) | 173 lb (78 kg) | 2001-05-21 | Calgary, Alberta | Camrose Kodiaks (AJHL) | — |
| 14 | (United States) | Spence Evans | Freshman | D | 6' 3" (1.91 m) | 195 lb (88 kg) | 2002-04-29 | Oyster Bay Cove, New York | Johnstown Tomahawks (NAHL) | — |
| 15 | (United States) | Tony Andreozzi | Sophomore | D | 5' 11" (1.8 m) | 190 lb (86 kg) | 2000-04-16 | Winchester, Massachusetts | Salmon Arm Silverbacks (BCHL) | — |
| 16 | (Canada) | Tristan Crozier (C) | Senior | F | 5' 11" (1.8 m) | 184 lb (83 kg) | 1998-02-23 | Calgary, Alberta | Nanaimo Clippers (BCHL) | — |
| 17 | (Canada) | Bradley Cocca | Junior | F | 5' 8" (1.73 m) | 170 lb (77 kg) | 1999-08-13 | Toronto, Ontario | Merritt Centennials (BCHL) | — |
| 18 | (Canada) | Jake Harris | Senior | F | 5' 9" (1.75 m) | 177 lb (80 kg) | 1998-04-10 | Toronto, Ontario | Nanaimo Clippers (BCHL) | — |
| 19 | (Finland) | Samuli Niinisaari | Junior | D | 6' 1" (1.85 m) | 187 lb (85 kg) | 1998-08-11 | Hamina, Finland | Lincoln Stars (USHL) | — |
| 20 | (Canada) | Noah Wakeford | Freshman | F | 5' 8" (1.73 m) | 175 lb (79 kg) | 2000-06-29 | Okotoks, Alberta | Trail Smoke Eaters (BCHL) | — |
| 21 | (United States) | Wyatt Schlaht | Freshman | F | 6' 2" (1.88 m) | 200 lb (91 kg) | 2000-06-04 | Cherry Hills Village, Colorado | Surrey Eagles (BCHL) | — |
| 22 | (United States) | Matty Holmes | Junior | F | 6' 2" (1.88 m) | 200 lb (91 kg) | 1999-02-22 | Rye, New York | Chilliwack Chiefs (BCHL) | — |
| 23 | (Canada) | Jackson Munro | Freshman | D | 5' 11" (1.8 m) | 180 lb (82 kg) | 2000-02-11 | Vancouver, British Columbia | Chilliwack Chiefs (BCHL) | — |
| 24 | (Canada) | Dorian Dawson | Senior | D | 6' 2" (1.88 m) | 205 lb (93 kg) | 1997-05-29 | Collingwood, Ontario | Sioux City Musketeers (USHL) | — |
| 25 | (United States) | Michael Maloney | Senior | F | 5' 10" (1.78 m) | 185 lb (84 kg) | 1998-02-17 | McHenry, Illinois | Omaha Lancers (USHL) | — |
| 26 | (United States) | James Crossman | Junior | D | 6' 3" (1.91 m) | 200 lb (91 kg) | 1998-11-23 | Denver, Colorado | Jamestown Rebels (NAHL) | — |
| 27 | (United States) | Jordan Tonelli | Sophomore | F | 6' 0" (1.83 m) | 180 lb (82 kg) | 2000-06-30 | Armonk, New York | Cedar Rapids RoughRiders (USHL) | — |
| 28 | (United States) | Brenden Clark | Freshman | F | 6' 0" (1.83 m) | 185 lb (84 kg) | 2002-01-16 | Morris Plains, New Jersey | Johnstown Tomahawks (NAHL) | — |
| 29 | (United States) | Cole Quisenberry | Junior | F | 5' 11" (1.8 m) | 180 lb (82 kg) | 1999-03-22 | Denver, Colorado | Chicago Steel (USHL) | — |
| 31 | (Canada) | Mathieu Caron | Freshman | G | 6' 0" (1.83 m) | 190 lb (86 kg) | 2000-03-29 | Abbotsford, British Columbia | Chilliwack Chiefs (BCHL) | — |
| 33 | (United States) | Gabriel Vinal | Senior | G | 6' 2" (1.88 m) | 185 lb (84 kg) | 1999-01-12 | Syracuse, New York | Aberdeen Wings (NAHL) | — |
| 35 | (United States) | Luke Kania (A) | Graduate | G | 6' 2" (1.88 m) | 190 lb (86 kg) | 1996-01-24 | Chicago, Illinois | Minnesota Wilderness (NAHL) | — |

== Standings ==
2021–22 ECAC Hockey Standings
| | Conference record | | | | | | | | | | Overall record | | | | | |
| | GP | W | L | T | OTW | OTL | 3/SW | PTS | GF | GA | GP | W | L | T | GF | GA |
|---|---|---|---|---|---|---|---|---|---|---|---|---|---|---|---|---|
| #8 Quinnipiac † | 22 | 17 | 4 | 1 | 0 | 1 | 1 | 54 | 71 | 14 | 42 | 32 | 7 | 3 | 139 | 53 |
| #17 Clarkson | 22 | 14 | 4 | 4 | 0 | 2 | 3 | 51 | 86 | 47 | 37 | 21 | 10 | 6 | 123 | 85 |
| #15 Harvard * | 22 | 14 | 6 | 2 | 0 | 0 | 2 | 46 | 69 | 46 | 35 | 21 | 11 | 3 | 116 | 82 |
| Cornell | 22 | 12 | 6 | 4 | 2 | 1 | 0 | 39 | 73 | 47 | 32 | 18 | 10 | 4 | 100 | 72 |
| Colgate | 22 | 9 | 9 | 4 | 1 | 0 | 3 | 33 | 55 | 57 | 40 | 18 | 18 | 4 | 111 | 112 |
| Rensselaer | 22 | 10 | 12 | 0 | 0 | 0 | 0 | 30 | 58 | 63 | 44 | 18 | 23 | 3 | 114 | 119 |
| Union | 22 | 9 | 11 | 2 | 3 | 1 | 0 | 27 | 52 | 66 | 37 | 14 | 19 | 4 | 89 | 110 |
| St. Lawrence | 22 | 7 | 10 | 5 | 2 | 0 | 2 | 26 | 44 | 60 | 37 | 11 | 19 | 7 | 72 | 110 |
| Brown | 22 | 6 | 12 | 4 | 0 | 1 | 2 | 25 | 36 | 61 | 31 | 7 | 20 | 4 | 50 | 100 |
| Princeton | 22 | 7 | 14 | 1 | 0 | 1 | 0 | 23 | 54 | 89 | 31 | 8 | 21 | 2 | 70 | 122 |
| Yale | 22 | 7 | 14 | 1 | 3 | 1 | 1 | 21 | 38 | 60 | 30 | 8 | 21 | 1 | 55 | 90 |
| Dartmouth | 22 | 5 | 15 | 2 | 0 | 3 | 1 | 21 | 45 | 71 | 32 | 7 | 22 | 3 | 69 | 110 |
Championship: March 19, 2022 † indicates conference regular season champion (Cleary Cup) * indicates conference tournament champion (Whitelaw Cup); Rankings: USCHO.com Top 20 Poll

== Schedule and results ==
| Date | Time | Opponent^{#} | Rank^{#} | Site | TV | Decision | Result | Attendance | Record |
Regular Season
| October 30 | 7:00 PM | Yale | | Meehan Auditorium • Providence, Rhode Island | | Kania | W 2–0 | 743 | 1–0–0 (1–0–0) |
| November 5 | 7:00 PM | Princeton | | Meehan Auditorium • Providence, Rhode Island | | Kania | L 3–6 | 427 | 1–1–0 (1–1–0) |
| November 6 | 7:00 PM | #6 Quinnipiac | | Meehan Auditorium • Providence, Rhode Island | | Caron | L 0–1 | 383 | 1–2–0 (1–2–0) |
| November 19 | 7:00 PM | at #10 Cornell | | Lynah Rink • Ithaca, New York | | Caron | L 2–3 ^{OT} | 2,362 | 1–3–0 (1–3–0) |
| November 20 | 7:30 PM | at Colgate | | Class of 1965 Arena • Hamilton, New York | | Caron | L 0–6 | 523 | 1–4–0 (1–4–0) |
| November 23 | 7:00 PM | at #16 Harvard | | Bright-Landry Hockey Center • Boston, Massachusetts | | Kania | L 2–5 | 1,498 | 1–5–0 (1–5–0) |
| November 26 | 2:05 PM | at Holy Cross* | | Hart Center • Worcester, Massachusetts | | Caron | L 1–5 | 261 | 1–6–0 |
| November 27 | 7:00 PM | #14 Providence* | | Meehan Auditorium • Providence, Rhode Island (Mayor's Cup) | NESN+ | Kania | L 0–4 | 842 | 1–7–0 |
| December 3 | 7:00 PM | #17 Harvard | | Meehan Auditorium • Providence, Rhode Island | | Caron | W 2–0 | 416 | 2–7–0 (2–5–0) |
| December 4 | 7:00 PM | Dartmouth | | Meehan Auditorium • Providence, Rhode Island | | Caron | W 4–0 | 357 | 3–7–0 (3–5–0) |
| December 7 | 7:00 PM | at Boston College* | | Conte Forum • Chestnut Hill, Massachusetts | | Caron | L 2–5 | 2,597 | 3–8–0 |
| December 10 | 7:00 PM | at Yale | | Ingalls Rink • New Haven, Connecticut | | Kania | L 3–4 | 1,127 | 3–9–0 (3–6–0) |
| December 31 | 2:00 PM | Boston University* | | Meehan Auditorium • Providence, Rhode Island | | Kania | L 1–5 | 473 | 3–10–0 |
| January 2 | 4:00 PM | Merrimack* | | Meehan Auditorium • Providence, Rhode Island | | Kania | L 1–7 | 160 | 3–11–0 |
| January 21 | 7:00 PM | at Union | | Achilles Rink • Schenectady, New York | | Caron | L 1–3 | 1,493 | 3–12–0 (3–7–0) |
| January 22 | 7:00 PM | at Rensselaer | | Houston Field House • Troy, New York | | Caron | W 3–2 | 0 | 4–12–0 (4–7–0) |
| January 28 | 1:00 PM | at Princeton | | Hobey Baker Memorial Rink • Princeton, New Jersey | | Caron | L 1–6 | 0 | 4–13–0 (4–8–0) |
| January 30 | 4:00 PM | Long Island* | | Meehan Auditorium • Providence, Rhode Island | | Kania | L 3–4 | 170 | 4–14–0 |
| February 1 | 3:00 PM | #11 Cornell | | Meehan Auditorium • Providence, Rhode Island | | Caron | W 2–1 | 262 | 5–14–0 (5–8–0) |
| February 4 | 7:00 PM | #20 Clarkson | | Meehan Auditorium • Providence, Rhode Island | | Caron | L 0–5 | 195 | 5–15–0 (5–9–0) |
| February 5 | 7:00 PM | St. Lawrence | | Meehan Auditorium • Providence, Rhode Island | | Caron | T 1–1 ^{SOL} | 417 | 5–15–1 (5–9–1) |
| February 8 | 7:00 PM | at #2 Quinnipiac | | People's United Center • Hamden, Connecticut | | Caron | L 1–4 | 1,813 | 5–16–1 (5–10–1) |
| February 11 | 8:00 PM | at Dartmouth | | Thompson Arena • Hanover, New Hampshire | | Caron | W 3–2 ^{OT} | 878 | 6–16–1 (6–10–1) |
| February 14 | 5:00 PM | Colgate | | Meehan Auditorium • Providence, Rhode Island | | Caron | T 1–1 ^{SOL} | 207 | 6–16–2 (6–10–2) |
| February 18 | 7:00 PM | Rensselaer | | Meehan Auditorium • Providence, Rhode Island | | Caron | L 2–4 | 291 | 6–17–2 (6–11–2) |
| February 19 | 7:00 PM | Union | | Meehan Auditorium • Providence, Rhode Island | | Caron | T 2–2 ^{SOW} | 537 | 6–17–3 (6–11–3) |
| February 25 | 7:00 PM | at St. Lawrence | | Appleton Arena • Canton, New York | | Caron | T 1–1 ^{SOW} | 905 | 6–17–4 (6–11–4) |
| February 26 | 7:00 PM | at #17 Clarkson | | Cheel Arena • Potsdam, New York | | Caron | L 0–4 | 2,429 | 6–18–4 (6–12–4) |
ECAC Hockey Tournament
| March 4 | 7:00 PM | at St. Lawrence* | | Appleton Arena • Canton, New York (First Round game 1) | | Caron | L 1–4 | 1,142 | 6–19–4 |
| March 5 | 7:00 PM | at St. Lawrence* | | Appleton Arena • Canton, New York (First Round game 2) | | Caron | W 2–1 ^{OT} | 1,265 | 7–19–4 |
| March 6 | 7:00 PM | at St. Lawrence* | | Appleton Arena • Canton, New York (First Round game 3) | | Caron | L 3–4 ^{OT} | 894 | 7–20–4 |
Brown Lost Series 1–2
*Non-conference game. ^{#}Rankings from USCHO.com Poll. All times are in Eastern Time. Source:

== Scoring statistics ==
| Name | Position | Games | Goals | Assists | Points | PIM |
|---|---|---|---|---|---|---|
| Justin Jallen | F | 30 | 10 | 7 | 17 | 6 |
| Tristan Crozier | F | 26 | 6 | 9 | 15 | 23 |
| Michael Maloney | F | 31 | 10 | 3 | 13 | 18 |
| Luke Krys | D | 31 | 3 | 10 | 13 | 38 |
| Samuli Niinisaari | D | 29 | 1 | 11 | 12 | 10 |
| Jake Harris | LW | 30 | 3 | 7 | 10 | 8 |
| Brett Bliss | D | 30 | 2 | 7 | 9 | 18 |
| Nathan Plessis | F | 31 | 3 | 4 | 7 | 16 |
| Thomas Manty | F | 25 | 3 | 2 | 5 | 4 |
| Jordan Tonelli | C/LW | 26 | 3 | 2 | 5 | 14 |
| Cole Quisenberry | F | 19 | 2 | 3 | 5 | 6 |
| Luke Albert | D | 31 | 0 | 5 | 5 | 29 |
| Jackson Munro | D | 16 | 1 | 3 | 4 | 31 |
| Matt Sutton | F | 22 | 1 | 3 | 4 | 2 |
| James Crossman | D | 19 | 1 | 2 | 3 | 14 |
| Lynden Grandberg | F | 26 | 0 | 3 | 3 | 4 |
| Wyatt Schlaht | F | 28 | 0 | 3 | 3 | 16 |
| Jonny Russell | RW | 30 | 1 | 0 | 1 | 18 |
| Tony Andreozzi | D | 31 | 0 | 1 | 1 | 6 |
| Gabriel Vinal | G | 2 | 0 | 0 | 0 | 0 |
| Spencer Evans | D | 4 | 0 | 0 | 0 | 0 |
| Luke Kania | G | 9 | 0 | 0 | 0 | 0 |
| Connor Marshall | F | 10 | 0 | 0 | 0 | 0 |
| Bradley Cocca | C | 14 | 0 | 0 | 0 | 8 |
| Brendan Clark | F | 22 | 0 | 0 | 0 | 8 |
| Noah Wakeford | F | 23 | 0 | 0 | 0 | 2 |
| Mathieu Caron | G | 26 | 0 | 0 | 0 | 0 |
| Bench | - | - | - | - | - | 0 |
| Total | | | 50 | 85 | 135 | 299 |

== Goaltending statistics ==
| Name | Games | Minutes | Wins | Losses | Ties | Goals against | Saves | Shut outs | SV % | GAA |
|---|---|---|---|---|---|---|---|---|---|---|
| Mathieu Caron | 26 | 1402 | 6 | 14 | 2 | 64 | 654 | 2 | .911 | 2.74 |
| Luke Kania | 9 | 420 | 1 | 6 | 0 | 26 | 203 | 1 | .886 | 3.71 |
| Gabriel Vinal | 2 | 48 | 0 | 0 | 0 | 4 | 20 | 0 | .833 | 4.96 |
| Empty Net | - | 12 | - | - | - | 6 | - | - | - | - |
| Total | 31 | 1884 | 7 | 20 | 4 | 100 | 877 | 3 | .898 | 3.19 |

== Rankings ==
| Poll | Week | | | | | | | | | | | | | | | | | | | | | | | | | |
| Poll | Pre | 1 | 2 | 3 | 4 | 5 | 6 | 7 | 8 | 9 | 10 | 11 | 12 | 13 | 14 | 15 | 16 | 17 | 18 | 19 | 20 | 21 | 22 | 23 | 24 | 25 (Final) |
|---|---|---|---|---|---|---|---|---|---|---|---|---|---|---|---|---|---|---|---|---|---|---|---|---|---|---|
| USCHO.com | NR | NR | NR | NR | NR | NR | NR | NR | NR | NR | NR | NR | NR | NR | NR | NR | NR | NR | NR | NR | NR | NR | NR | NR | - | NR |
| USA Today | NR | NR | NR | NR | NR | NR | NR | NR | NR | NR | NR | NR | NR | NR | NR | NR | NR | NR | NR | NR | NR | NR | NR | NR | NR | NR |

Note: USCHO did not release a poll in week 24.
