= 2021–22 St. Lawrence Saints men's ice hockey season =

- Conference: 8th ECAC Hockey
- Home ice: Appleton Arena

Rankings
- USCHO: NR
- USA Today: NR

Record
- Overall: 11–19–7
- Conference: 7–10–5
- Home: 5–11–3
- Road: 6–8–4

Coaches and captains
- Head coach: Brent Brekke
- Assistant coaches: Ben Murphy; Tommy Hill
- Captain(s): David Jankowski; Kaden Pickering

The 2021–22 St. Lawrence Saints Men's ice hockey season was the 82nd season of play for the program and the 61st season in the ECAC Hockey conference. The Saints represented the St. Lawrence University and were coached by Brent Brekke, in his 3rd season.

== Season ==
After a stunning conference championship in 2021, St. Lawrence was hoping to continue the upwards swing but the team got off to a rotten start. Emil Zetterquist was a tower of strength in goal, holding opponents to an average of 2 goals a game in his first eight starts, but the team's offense was pitiful. Over the first month and a half of their season, the Saints scored more than 2 goals just once and ended up with twice as many ties as they had wins. The lack of scoring was a trend that continued throughout the entire season and prevented the Larries from being able to make any waves in their conference. On the other side of the puck, St. Lawrence's stable defense went through a rough patch in the middle of the season and their average goals allowed ballooned to more than double what it had been at the start.

In late January, the Saints finally recovered on the back end and gave Zetterquist the help he needed. In their final eleven games, St. Lawrence played .500 hockey, which enabled them to finish 8th in the conference and receive a home site for the First Round of the conference tournament.

The series against Brown pitted two fairly remedial offenses against one another but that did not prevent some drama from being created. After a solid win in the first game, St. Lawrence dropped the second in overtime. A deciding third match was required and the Bears, who averaged just over one and a half goals a game, built a 3–1 lead midway through the game. The Saints came storming back, however, and tied the score with less than 10 minutes to play. The pivotal game required overtime as well with every shot potentially ending someone's season. As it turned out, St. Lawrence only needed one chance because the first shot on goal in the extra session found its way into the net and the Saints advanced to the quarterfinals.

Since every higher-seed won in the opening round, St. Lawrence was set against top-seeded Quinnipiac in the second round. The Tournament-bound Bobcats had been a powerhouse in conference all season and looked like they were ready to trounce the Saints after a routine win in the first game. However, the Larries would not just lay down and the team fought back in the second match. The Saints scored twice early in the third period, taking a 3–1 edge and potentially setting up a third meeting. Quinnipiac rallied to tie the score but couldn't knock out St. Lawrence before the buzzer, forcing overtime. In the extra period, neither offense was particularly strong, with just 10 shots being recorded between the two, but it was the Larries who had more chances on goal. That trend continued in the second overtime and, as their shot total increased, it seemed like only a matter of time before the Saints broke through. Unfortunately, the team ran out of time in the 89th minute of play and St. Lawrence's valiant effort ended in defeat.

== Departures ==
Player	Position	Nationality	Cause
Philip Alftberg	Forward/Defenseman	Sweden	Graduation (signed with HC Vita Hästen)
Callum Cusinato	Forward	Canada	Graduation (retired)
Mark Mahoney	Defenseman	United States	Left program (retired)
Jake Nielsen	Forward	United States	Graduation (retired)
Jake Stevens	Defenseman	United States	Graduate transfer to Long Island
Cameron White	Defenseman	Canada	Graduate transfer to Western Ontario
Nicholas Wildgoose	Forward	United States	Left program (retired)
Dylan Woolf	Defenseman	United States	Graduation (signed with Florida Everblades)

== Recruiting ==
Player	Position	Nationality	Age	Notes
Will Arquiett	Forward	United States	21	Brasher Falls, NY
Josh Boyer	Forward	United States	21	Wasilla, AK; transfer from Omaha
Drake Burgin	Defenseman	Canada	20	Winnipeg, MB
Philippe Chapleau	Defenseman	Canada	21	Longueuil, QC
Isaac MacLeod	Forward	Canada	19	Caledonia, ON
Ty Naaykens	Forward	Canada	20	Winnipeg, MB
Chris Pappas	Forward	Canada	20	Etobicoke, ON
Mason Waite	Defenseman	Canada	21	Winnipeg, MB

== Roster ==
As of September 9, 2021.

No.	Nat.	Player	Class	Pos	Height	Weight	DoB	Hometown	Previous team	NHL rights
1	(Sweden)	Emil Zetterquist	Senior	G	6' 1" (1.85 m)	190 lb (86 kg)	1998-09-21	Stockholm, Sweden	Coulee Region Chill (NAHL)	—
3	(United States)	Luke Erickson	Sophomore	D	6' 2" (1.88 m)	210 lb (95 kg)	1999-04-15	Woodbury, Minnesota	Fairbanks Ice Dogs (NAHL)	—
4	(Canada)	Mason Waite	Freshman	D	6' 2" (1.88 m)	190 lb (86 kg)	2000-04-04	Winnipeg, Manitoba	Prince George Spruce Kings (BCHL)	—
7	(United States)	Luc Salem	Sophomore	D	5' 10" (1.78 m)	175 lb (79 kg)	1999-07-09	Santa Monica, California	Topeka Pilots (NAHL)	—
8	(Canada)	Oak MacLeod	Freshman	F	5' 10" (1.78 m)	185 lb (84 kg)	2002-04-04	Caledonia, Ontario	Jersey Hitmen (NCDC)	—
9	(Canada)	Philippe Chapleau	Freshman	D	5' 8" (1.73 m)	175 lb (79 kg)	2000-07-06	Longueuil, Quebec	Penticton Vees (BCHL)	—
10	(Canada)	David Jankowski (C)	Senior	F	6' 1" (1.85 m)	175 lb (79 kg)	1997-05-25	Waterdown, Ontario	Hawkesbury Hawks (CCHL)	—
11	(United States)	Will Arquiett	Freshman	F	5' 8" (1.73 m)	175 lb (79 kg)	2000-06-25	Brasher Falls, New York	Aberdeen Wings (NAHL)	—
12	(Canada)	Greg Lapointe	Sophomore	F	5' 9" (1.75 m)	175 lb (79 kg)	2001-01-01	Granby, Quebec	Coquitlam Express (BCHL)	—
13	(Finland)	Aleksi Peltonen	Junior	F	5' 10" (1.78 m)	180 lb (82 kg)	1998-06-08	Helsinki, Finland	Omaha Lancers (USHL)	—
14	(Canada)	Justin Paul	Sophomore	F	5' 11" (1.8 m)	188 lb (85 kg)	2000-04-10	Thunder Bay, Ontario	Wellington Dukes (OJHL)	—
15	(Canada)	Ty Naaykens	Freshman	F	6' 1" (1.85 m)	185 lb (84 kg)	2001-01-27	Winnipeg, Manitoba	Fairbanks Ice Dogs (NAHL)	—
16	(Canada)	Drake Burgin	Freshman	D	5' 10" (1.78 m)	180 lb (82 kg)	2000-10-22	Winnipeg, Manitoba	Cranbrook Bucks (BCHL)	—
17	(United States)	Reilly Moran	Sophomore	F	5' 11" (1.8 m)	176 lb (80 kg)	2000-04-24	Hingham, Massachusetts	Powell River Kings (BCHL)	—
18	(United States)	Kaden Pickering (C)	Senior	F	5' 9" (1.75 m)	180 lb (82 kg)	1998-12-17	Madrid, New York	Chilliwack Chiefs (BCHL)	—
19	(United States)	Max Dorrington	Sophomore	F	6' 3" (1.91 m)	205 lb (93 kg)	2001-08-30	North Reading, Massachusetts	Cushing Academy (USHS–MA)	—
20	(United States)	Nicholas Trela	Sophomore	F	6' 2" (1.88 m)	185 lb (84 kg)	1999-08-26	Trenton, Michigan	Amarillo Bulls (NAHL)	—
21	(United States)	Cameron Buhl	Junior	F	5' 10" (1.78 m)	184 lb (83 kg)	1998-12-03	South St. Paul, Minnesota	Minnesota Magicians (NAHL)	—
22	(Canada)	Jeff Clarke	Senior	D	6' 4" (1.93 m)	215 lb (98 kg)	1999-04-15	London, Ontario	Oakville (OJHL)	—
23	(United States)	Ashton Fry	Junior	F	5' 11" (1.8 m)	185 lb (84 kg)	1998-07-16	Highlands Ranch, Colorado	Kemptville 73's (CCHL)	—
24	(Canada)	Tucker McIntosh	Sophomore	D	6' 1" (1.85 m)	175 lb (79 kg)	2001-05-20	Toronto, Ontario	Ottawa Jr. Senators (CCHL)	—
26	(Canada)	Chris Pappas	Freshman	F	5' 11" (1.8 m)	165 lb (75 kg)	2000-11-26	Toronto, Ontario	Brooks Bandits (AJHL)	—
27	(United States)	Logan Ritchie	Sophomore	F	5' 11" (1.8 m)	180 lb (82 kg)	1999-07-27	O'Fallon, Missouri	Kenai River Brown Bears (NAHL)	—
28	(United States)	Josh Boyer	Junior	F	6' 3" (1.91 m)	200 lb (91 kg)	1999-10-07	Wasilla, Alaska	Omaha (NCHC)	—
29	(United States)	Jordan Steinmetz	Junior	F	5' 8" (1.73 m)	160 lb (73 kg)	1999-01-10	Chippewa Falls, Wisconsin	Sioux City Musketeers (USHL)	—
31	(Canada)	Francis Boisvert	Junior	G	6' 2" (1.88 m)	170 lb (77 kg)	1999-03-11	Blainville, Quebec	Ottawa Jr. Senators (CCHL)	—
33	(United States)	Tim Makowski (A)	Junior	D	6' 1" (1.85 m)	195 lb (88 kg)	1998-11-14	St. Louis, Missouri	Aberdeen Wings (NAHL)	—
35	(United States)	Grant Adams	Sophomore	G	6' 2" (1.88 m)	195 lb (88 kg)	2000-09-22	South Bend, Indiana	Salmon Arm Silverbacks (BCHL)	—

== Standings ==
2021–22 ECAC Hockey Standings
	Conference record										Overall record					
	GP	W	L	T	OTW	OTL	3/SW	PTS	GF	GA	GP	W	L	T	GF	GA
#8 Quinnipiac †	22	17	4	1	0	1	1	54	71	14	42	32	7	3	139	53
#17 Clarkson	22	14	4	4	0	2	3	51	86	47	37	21	10	6	123	85
#15 Harvard *	22	14	6	2	0	0	2	46	69	46	35	21	11	3	116	82
Cornell	22	12	6	4	2	1	0	39	73	47	32	18	10	4	100	72
Colgate	22	9	9	4	1	0	3	33	55	57	40	18	18	4	111	112
Rensselaer	22	10	12	0	0	0	0	30	58	63	44	18	23	3	114	119
Union	22	9	11	2	3	1	0	27	52	66	37	14	19	4	89	110
St. Lawrence	22	7	10	5	2	0	2	26	44	60	37	11	19	7	72	110
Brown	22	6	12	4	0	1	2	25	36	61	31	7	20	4	50	100
Princeton	22	7	14	1	0	1	0	23	54	89	31	8	21	2	70	122
Yale	22	7	14	1	3	1	1	21	38	60	30	8	21	1	55	90
Dartmouth	22	5	15	2	0	3	1	21	45	71	32	7	22	3	69	110
Championship: March 19, 2022 † indicates conference regular season champion (Cleary Cup) * indicates conference tournament champion (Whitelaw Cup); Rankings: USCHO.com Top 20 Poll

== Schedule and results ==
Date	Time	Opponent^{#}	Rank^{#}	Site	TV	Decision	Result	Attendance	Record
Exhibition
October 2	7:00 PM	at #19 Clarkson*		Cheel Arena • Potsdam, New York (Exhibition)			W 3–0	3,000	
Regular season
October 8	9:07 PM	at Colorado College*		Ed Robson Arena • Colorado Springs, Colorado		Zetterquist	W 2–1	3,589	1–0–0
October 9	8:07 PM	at Colorado College*		Ed Robson Arena • Colorado Springs, Colorado		Zetterquist	T 1–1	3,571	1–0–1
October 16	7:05 PM	at RIT*		Gene Polisseni Center • Henrietta, New York		Zetterquist	L 1–2	6,753	1–1–1
October 29	7:07 PM	at Lake Superior State*		Taffy Abel Arena • Sault Ste. Marie, Michigan		Zetterquist	T 2–2 ^{OT}	1,151	1–1–2
October 30	6:07 PM	at Lake Superior State*		Taffy Abel Arena • Sault Ste. Marie, Michigan		Adams	L 1–7	1,136	1–2–2
November 5	7:00 PM	at Rensselaer		Houston Field House • Troy, New York		Zetterquist	W 4–3	344	2–2–2 (1–0–0)
November 6	7:00 PM	at Union		Achilles Rink • Schenectady, New York		Zetterquist	T 2–2 ^{SOW}	1,594	2–2–3 (1–0–1)
November 12	7:00 PM	Dartmouth		Appleton Arena • Canton, New York		Zetterquist	L 2–3	1,774	2–3–3 (1–1–1)
November 13	7:00 PM	#10 Harvard		Appleton Arena • Canton, New York		Zetterquist	T 1–1 ^{SOL}	1,816	2–3–4 (1–1–2)
November 19	7:00 PM	at Princeton		Hobey Baker Memorial Rink • Princeton, New Jersey		Zetterquist	W 6–4	1,265	3–3–4 (2–1–2)
November 20	7:00 PM	at #5 Quinnipiac		People's United Center • Hamden, Connecticut		Zetterquist	L 0–8	2,217	3–4–4 (2–2–2)
November 26	7:00 PM	#7 Western Michigan*		Appleton Arena • Canton, New York		Zetterquist	L 2–8	671	3–5–4
November 27	7:00 PM	#7 Western Michigan*		Appleton Arena • Canton, New York		Zetterquist	L 1–5	652	3–6–4
December 3	7:00 PM	#9 Cornell		Appleton Arena • Canton, New York		Zetterquist	L 1–4	1,256	3–7–4 (2–3–2)
December 4	7:00 PM	Colgate		Appleton Arena • Canton, New York		Zetterquist	W 4–3	1,031	4–7–4 (3–3–2)
December 29	7:00 PM	#15 Massachusetts–Lowell*		Appleton Arena • Canton, New York		Zetterquist	L 2–3	727	4–8–4
December 31	7:00 PM	#14 Omaha*		Appleton Arena • Canton, New York		Zetterquist	W 3–2	468	5–8–4
January 1	7:00 PM	#14 Omaha*		Appleton Arena • Canton, New York		Zetterquist	L 0–5	639	5–9–4
January 14	7:00 PM	Union		Appleton Arena • Canton, New York		Boisvert	L 2–3 ^{OT}	492	5–10–4 (3–4–2)
January 17	7:00 PM	Rensselaer		Appleton Arena • Canton, New York		Adams	L 0–4	412	5–11–4 (3–5–2)
January 21	7:00 PM	at #20 Harvard		Bright-Landry Hockey Center • Boston, Massachusetts		Zetterquist	L 1–4	412	5–12–4 (3–6–2)
January 22	7:00 PM	at Dartmouth		Thompson Arena • Hanover, New Hampshire		Zetterquist	W 3–1	199	6–12–4 (4–6–2)
January 28	7:00 PM	at Clarkson		Cheel Arena • Potsdam, New York		Zetterquist	L 0–1	3,224	6–13–4 (4–7–2)
January 29	7:00 PM	Clarkson		Appleton Arena • Canton, New York		Zetterquist	T 4–4 ^{SOL}	2,285	6–13–5 (4–7–3)
February 4	7:00 PM	at Yale		Ingalls Rink • New Haven, Connecticut		Zetterquist	W 2–1 ^{OT}	0	7–13–5 (5–7–3)
February 5	7:00 PM	at Brown		Meehan Auditorium • Providence, Rhode Island		Zetterquist	T 1–1 ^{SOW}	417	7–13–6 (5–7–4)
February 11	7:00 PM	#2 Quinnipiac		Appleton Arena • Canton, New York		Zetterquist	L 1–3	651	7–14–6 (5–8–4)
February 12	7:00 PM	Princeton		Appleton Arena • Canton, New York		Zetterquist	L 2–3	773	7–15–6 (5–9–4)
February 18	7:00 PM	at #18 Cornell		Lynah Rink • Ithaca, New York		Zetterquist	W 2–1	3,577	8–15–6 (6–9–4)
February 19	7:00 PM	at Colgate		Class of 1965 Arena • Hamilton, New York		Zetterquist	L 2–4	927	8–16–6 (6–10–4)
February 25	7:00 PM	Brown		Appleton Arena • Canton, New York		Zetterquist	T 1–1 ^{SOL}	905	8–16–7 (6–10–5)
February 26	7:00 PM	Yale		Appleton Arena • Canton, New York		Zetterquist	W 3–1	1,236	9–16–7 (7–10–5)
ECAC Hockey Tournament
March 4	7:00 PM	Brown*		Appleton Arena • Canton, New York (First Round game 1)		Zetterquist	W 4–1	1,142	10–16–7
March 5	7:00 PM	Brown*		Appleton Arena • Canton, New York (First Round game 2)		Zetterquist	L 1–2 ^{OT}	1,265	10–17–7
March 6	7:00 PM	Brown*		Appleton Arena • Canton, New York (First Round game 3)		Zetterquist	W 4–3 ^{OT}	894	11–17–7
St. Lawrence Won Series 2–1
March 11	7:00 PM	at #6 Quinnipiac*		People's United Center • Hamden, Connecticut (Quarterfinal game 1)		Zetterquist	L 1–4	2,739	11–18–7
March 12	7:00 PM	at #6 Quinnipiac*		People's United Center • Hamden, Connecticut (Quarterfinal game 2)		Zetterquist	L 3–4 ^{OT}	2,401	11–19–7
St. Lawrence Lost Series 0–2
*Non-conference game. ^{#}Rankings from USCHO.com Poll. All times are in Eastern Time. Source:

== Scoring statistics ==
Name	Position	Games	Goals	Assists	Points	PIM
Kaden Pickering	RW	36	6	13	19	30
Justin Paul	LW	37	8	10	18	26
David Jankowski	C	33	4	12	16	16
Aleksi Peltonen	F	27	4	10	14	0
Philippe Chapleau	D	36	4	9	13	2
Max Dorrington	F	32	8	4	12	47
Mason Waite	D	36	3	8	11	14
Chris Pappas	C	26	2	8	10	6
Luc Salem	D	37	2	8	10	14
Jordan Steinmetz	F	35	5	4	9	26
Reilly Moran	F	33	5	3	8	38
Cameron Buhl	F	32	4	4	8	12
Josh Boyer	C	32	3	5	8	16
Ashton Fry	D	27	2	6	8	18
Ty Naaykens	D	32	4	3	7	10
Tim Makowski	D	31	2	5	7	37
Tucker McIntosh	D	35	2	3	5	25
Nick Trela	F	28	2	2	4	6
Luke Erickson	D	25	0	4	4	16
Isaac MacLeod	RW	16	1	2	3	8
Will Arquiett	F	15	1	0	1	18
Logan Ritchie	F	16	0	1	1	0
Drake Burgin	D	21	0	1	1	4
Jeff Clarke	D	24	0	1	1	12
Emil Zetterquist	G	34	0	1	1	0
Francis Boisvert	F	1	0	0	0	0
Grant Adams	G	4	0	0	0	0
Total			72	127	199	401

== Goaltending statistics ==
Name	Games	Minutes	Wins	Losses	Ties	Goals against	Saves	Shut outs	SV %	GAA
Emil Zetterquist	34	2030	11	16	7	87	822	0	.904	2.57
Francis Boisvert	1	58	0	1	0	3	32	0	.914	3.10
Grant Adams	6	175	0	2	0	15	57	0	.792	5.14
Empty Net	-	30	-	-	-	0	-	-	-	-
Total	37	2293	11	19	7	105	911	0	.897	2.75

== Rankings ==
Poll	Week																									
Poll	Pre	1	2	3	4	5	6	7	8	9	10	11	12	13	14	15	16	17	18	19	20	21	22	23	24	25 (Final)
USCHO.com	NR	NR	NR	NR	NR	NR	NR	NR	NR	NR	NR	NR	NR	NR	NR	NR	NR	NR	NR	NR	NR	NR	NR	NR	-	NR
USA Today	NR	NR	NR	NR	NR	NR	NR	NR	NR	NR	NR	NR	NR	NR	NR	NR	NR	NR	NR	NR	NR	NR	NR	NR	NR	NR

Note: USCHO did not release a poll in week 24.
