= 2021–22 Clarkson Golden Knights men's ice hockey season =

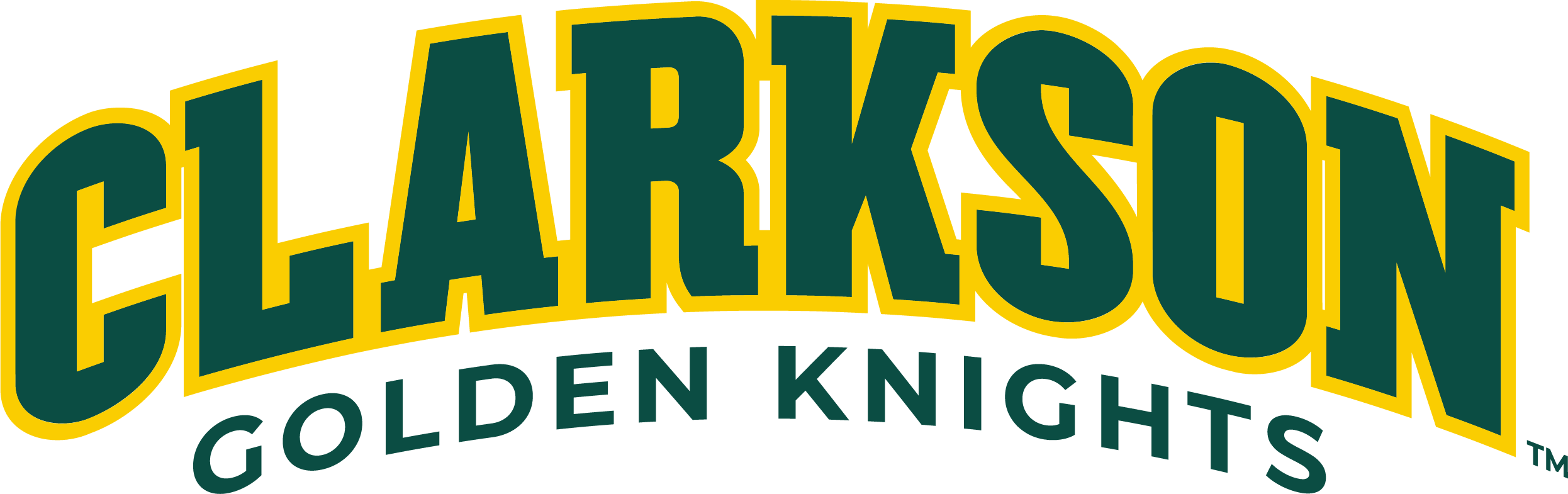
- Conference: 2nd ECAC Hockey
- Home ice: Cheel Arena

Rankings
- USCHO.com: 17
- USA Today: NR

Record
- Overall: 21–10–6
- Conference: 14–4–4
- Home: 14–2–2
- Road: 7–7–4
- Neutral: 0–1–0

Coaches and captains
- Head coach: Casey Jones
- Assistant coaches: Josh Hauge; Mike Towns
- Captain: Zach Tsekos
- Alternate captain: Jack Jacome

The 2021–22 Clarkson Golden Knights Men's ice hockey season was the 100th season of play for the program. They represented Clarkson University in the 2021–22 NCAA Division I men's ice hockey season and for the 61st season in the ECAC Hockey conference. The Golden Knights were coached by Casey Jones, in his 11th season, and played their home games at Cheel Arena.

== Season ==
After twice missing out on a chance to participate in the NCAA tournament, both as a direct result of COVID-19, Clarkson entered the '22 season looking for a bit of redemption. The Golden Knights got off to a less-than-stellar start, holding a .500 record in early November with three of their wins coming against Alaska, who were still recovering from not having played at all the year before. A strong performance from defending Rookie of the Year Ethan Haider in the second month helped Clarkson right the ship and enabled the team to climb back into the rankings by the beginning of December. Just as things were looking up for the team, Haider's game began to slip. He allowed 13 goals in three games with Clarkson losing each match.

The second half of the season was dominated by Haider being replaced in goal by Jacob Mucitelli while the team's nominal starter fought to rediscover his game. Mucitelli played well in goal, helping the Knights to an 11-game stretch where they didn't lose once. The hefty win total allowed Clarkson to get into the top-15 with a potential shot at an at-large bid but the team had a problem. ECAC Hockey possessed a terrible non-conference record. Part of the league's problem was that eight member teams had not played in 2021 and many were slow to get back into the swing of things. Whatever the cause, however, the poor marks meant that most of Clarkson's conference opponents were rated as weak competition in the PairWise rankings. This meant that each win for Clarkson didn't help the team as much as it otherwise would have while losses proved to be a sizable drag on their postseason hopes. When Clarkson lost two games near the end of the year, the team was pushed out of at-large contention despite being 10 games above .500.

Even finishing second in the conference didn't help Clarkson for the NCAA tournament, but it did give the team a decent draw for the conference quarterfinals. By that time, Haider and Mucitelli were in a battle for the starting role and each was given the chance to play one of the games against Union. Clarkson won both games in overtime but with Haider allowing fewer goals, he was given the start in the semifinal match versus Harvard. Entering the game, Clarkson was just outside the cutoff for an at-large bid and would have to at least reach the conference championship game to make the tournament. The Knights were locked in a close battle against the Crimson for much of the game, twice tying the score in the first two periods before taking a 1-goal lead into the third. Harvard ended up scoring three goals in the final frame to Clarkson's none and the Knights narrowly missed out on the tournament.

== Departures ==
Player	Position	Nationality	Cause
Grant Cooper	Forward	Canada	Graduation (signed with Reading Royals)
Josh Dunne	Forward	United States	Signed professional contract (Columbus Blue Jackets)
John Carter MacLean	Forward	United States	Graduation (retired)
Connor McCarthy	Defenseman	Canada	Graduation (signed with Bridgeport Islanders)
Kris Oldham	Goaltender	United States	Graduation (signed with Orlando Solar Bears)
David Silye	Forward	Canada	Transferred to Minnesota State
Nick Wicks	Forward	Canada	Transferred to Simon Fraser

== Recruiting ==
Player	Position	Nationality	Age	Notes
George Grannis	Forward	United States	21	Duluth, MN
Lukas Kälble	Defenseman	Germany	23	Mannheim, GER; graduate transfer from Lake Superior State
Caden Lewandowski	Defenseman	United States	21	Port Huron, MI
Ayrton Martino	Forward	Canada	19	Toronto, ON; selected 73rd overall in 2021
Brady Parker	Goaltender	Canada	21	Calgary, AB
Ryan Richardson	Forward	Canada	20	Stittsville, ON
Luke Santerno	Forward	Canada	25	Smithers, BC; graduate transfer from Bentley

== Roster ==
As of August 23, 2021.

No.	Nat.	Player	Class	Pos	Height	Weight	DoB	Hometown	Previous team	NHL rights
2	(Germany)	Lukas Kälble	Graduate	D	6' 2" (1.88 m)	205 lb (93 kg)	1997-10-13	Mannheim, Germany	Lake Superior State (WCHA)	—
3	(United States)	Kaelan Taylor	Sophomore	D	6' 2" (1.88 m)	185 lb (84 kg)	1999-01-03	Oceanside, California	Dubuque Fighting Saints (USHL)	—
4	(United States)	Brian Hurley	Senior	D	6' 0" (1.83 m)	216 lb (98 kg)	1998-06-18	Dellwood, Minnesota	Chicago Steel (USHL)	—
5	(United States)	Michael Underwood	Senior	D	6' 1" (1.85 m)	198 lb (90 kg)	1998-06-07	Bloomfield Hills, Michigan	Green Bay Gamblers (USHL)	—
6	(Canada)	Jack Jacome (A)	Graduate	F	5' 8" (1.73 m)	173 lb (78 kg)	1998-12-07	Caledon, Ontario	Georgetown Raiders (OJHL)	—
8	(Canada)	Chris Klack	Senior	F	5' 9" (1.75 m)	174 lb (79 kg)	1997-06-03	Georgetown, Ontario	Penticton Vees (BCHL)	—
9	(Canada)	Jamie Collins	Senior	F	5' 7" (1.7 m)	158 lb (72 kg)	1997-09-21	Fergus, Ontario	Nanaimo Clippers (BCHL)	—
11	(Canada)	Alex Campbell	Sophomore	F	5' 11" (1.8 m)	174 lb (79 kg)	2001-02-27	Châteauguay, Quebec	Omaha Lancers (USHL)	NSH, 65th overall 2019
12	(United States)	Caden Lewandowski	Freshman	D	6' 4" (1.93 m)	205 lb (93 kg)	2000-06-02	Mars, Pennsylvania	Johnstown Tomahawks (NAHL)	—
13	(Canada)	Mathieu Gosselin	Junior	F	5' 10" (1.78 m)	168 lb (76 kg)	1999-05-18	Quebec City, Quebec	Merritt Centennials (BCHL)	—
14	(United States)	Luke Mobley	Sophomore	F	6' 3" (1.91 m)	215 lb (98 kg)	1999-11-26	St. Louis Park, Minnesota	Omaha Lancers (USHL)	—
15	(Canada)	Ayrton Martino	Freshman	F	5' 11" (1.8 m)	167 lb (76 kg)	2002-09-28	Toronto, Ontario	Omaha Lancers (USHL)	DAL, 73rd overall 2021
16	(Germany)	Tommy Pasanen	Sophomore	D	6' 4" (1.93 m)	218 lb (99 kg)	2001-07-30	Schweinfurt, Germany	Sioux City Musketeers (USHL)	—
17	(Canada)	Zach Tsekos (C)	Graduate	F	5' 10" (1.78 m)	185 lb (84 kg)	1996-11-15	Montreal, Quebec	Sacred Heart (AHA)	—
18	(Canada)	Noah Beck	Sophomore	F	6' 3" (1.91 m)	191 lb (87 kg)	2001-03-25	Richmond Hill, Ontario	Fargo Force (USHL)	STL, 194th overall 2020
19	(Canada)	Nick Campoli	Senior	F	5' 11" (1.8 m)	191 lb (87 kg)	1999-02-16	Toronto, Ontario	North York Rangers (OJHL)	VGK, 158th overall 2017
20	(Canada)	Charlie Campbell	Sophomore	F	5' 10" (1.78 m)	163 lb (74 kg)	1999-12-01	Châteauguay, Quebec	Cornwall Colts (CCHL)	—
21	(United States)	George Grannis	Freshman	F	6' 0" (1.83 m)	195 lb (88 kg)	2000-04-16	Duluth, Minnesota	Bismarck Bobcats (NAHL)	—
23	(Canada)	Jordan Power	Sophomore	D	6' 1" (1.85 m)	187 lb (85 kg)	2001-07-31	Ottawa, Ontario	Lincoln Stars (USHL)	—
26	(Canada)	Ryan Richardson	Freshman	F	6' 1" (1.85 m)	185 lb (84 kg)	2001-04-09	Stittsville, Ontario	Fargo Force (USHL)	—
27	(Canada)	Dustyn McFaul	Junior	D	6' 2" (1.88 m)	191 lb (87 kg)	2000-08-04	Waterdown, Ontario	Pickering Panthers (OJHL)	BOS, 181st overall 2018
28	(United States)	Jordan Robert	Junior	F	5' 10" (1.78 m)	198 lb (90 kg)	1998-03-18	Massena, New York	Cowichan Valley Capitals (BCHL)	—
29	(Canada)	Anthony Romano	Junior	F	5' 11" (1.8 m)	185 lb (84 kg)	2000-10-07	Richmond Hill, Ontario	Sioux Falls Stampede (USHL)	ARI, 176th overall 2019
34	(Canada)	Brady Parker	Freshman	G	5' 10" (1.78 m)	180 lb (82 kg)	2000-07-10	Calgary, Alberta	Okotoks Oilers (AJHL)	—
39	(Canada)	Luke Santerno	Graduate	F	6' 3" (1.91 m)	200 lb (91 kg)	1996-06-24	Smithers, British Columbia	Bentley (AHA)	—
42	(United States)	Jacob Mucitelli	Sophomore	G	6' 3" (1.91 m)	188 lb (85 kg)	2000-03-24	Deerfield, New York	Lincoln Stars (USHL)	—
44	(United States)	Anthony Callin	Senior	F	6' 0" (1.83 m)	206 lb (93 kg)	1998-12-23	Middleton, Wisconsin	Madison Capitols (USHL)	—
47	(United States)	Ethan Haider	Sophomore	G	6' 3" (1.91 m)	209 lb (95 kg)	2001-09-04	Maple Grove, Minnesota	Sioux City Musketeers (USHL)	NSH, 148th overall 2019

== Standings ==
2021–22 ECAC Hockey Standings
	Conference record										Overall record					
	GP	W	L	T	OTW	OTL	3/SW	PTS	GF	GA	GP	W	L	T	GF	GA
#8 Quinnipiac †	22	17	4	1	0	1	1	54	71	14	42	32	7	3	139	53
#17 Clarkson	22	14	4	4	0	2	3	51	86	47	37	21	10	6	123	85
#15 Harvard *	22	14	6	2	0	0	2	46	69	46	35	21	11	3	116	82
Cornell	22	12	6	4	2	1	0	39	73	47	32	18	10	4	100	72
Colgate	22	9	9	4	1	0	3	33	55	57	40	18	18	4	111	112
Rensselaer	22	10	12	0	0	0	0	30	58	63	44	18	23	3	114	119
Union	22	9	11	2	3	1	0	27	52	66	37	14	19	4	89	110
St. Lawrence	22	7	10	5	2	0	2	26	44	60	37	11	19	7	72	110
Brown	22	6	12	4	0	1	2	25	36	61	31	7	20	4	50	100
Princeton	22	7	14	1	0	1	0	23	54	89	31	8	21	2	70	122
Yale	22	7	14	1	3	1	1	21	38	60	30	8	21	1	55	90
Dartmouth	22	5	15	2	0	3	1	21	45	71	32	7	22	3	69	110
Championship: March 19, 2022 † indicates conference regular season champion (Cleary Cup) * indicates conference tournament champion (Whitelaw Cup); Rankings: USCHO.com Top 20 Poll

== Schedule and results ==
Date	Time	Opponent^{#}	Rank^{#}	Site	TV	Decision	Result	Attendance	Record
Exhibition
October 2	7:00 PM	St. Lawrence*	#19	Cheel Arena • Potsdam, New York (Exhibition)			L 0–3	3,000	—
Regular season
October 8	11:07 PM	at Alaska*	#20	Carlson Center • Fairbanks, Alaska		Haider	W 2–1	1,278	1–0–0
October 9	11:07 PM	at Alaska*	#20	Carlson Center • Fairbanks, Alaska		Haider	L 1–2	1,412	1–1–0
October 19	7:00 PM	Canisius*		Cheel Arena • Potsdam, New York		Haider	T 4–4 ^{OT}	2,030	1–1–1
October 22	7:05 PM	Alaska*		Cheel Arena • Potsdam, New York		Haider	W 5–1	2,396	2–1–1
October 23	7:00 PM	Alaska*		Cheel Arena • Potsdam, New York		Haider	W 4–2	2,421	3–1–1
October 29	7:00 PM	#18 Michigan Tech*		Cheel Arena • Potsdam, New York		Haider	L 0–3	2,539	3–2–1
October 30	7:30 PM	#18 Michigan Tech*		Cheel Arena • Potsdam, New York		Haider	W 2–1	2,951	4–2–1
November 5	7:00 PM	at Union		Achilles Rink • Schenectady, New York		Haider	L 3–4 ^{OT}	1,691	4–3–1 (0–1–0)
November 6	7:00 PM	at Rensselaer		Houston Field House • Troy, New York		Haider	L 1–3	261	4–4–1 (0–2–0)
November 12	7:00 PM	#10 Harvard		Cheel Arena • Potsdam, New York		Haider	W 6–2	2,526	5–4–1 (1–2–0)
November 13	7:00 PM	Dartmouth		Cheel Arena • Potsdam, New York		Haider	W 3–0	2,620	6–4–1 (2–2–0)
November 19	7:00 PM	at #5 Quinnipiac		People's United Center • Hamden, Connecticut		Haider	T 2–2 ^{SOL}	2,521	6–4–2 (2–2–1)
November 20	7:00 PM	at Princeton		Hobey Baker Memorial Rink • Princeton, New Jersey		Haider	W 8–3	1,451	7–4–2 (3–2–1)
November 26	8:07 PM	at Wisconsin*		Kohl Center • Madison, Wisconsin	BSW+	Haider	T 1–1 ^{OT}	7,930	7–4–3
November 27	8:07 PM	at Wisconsin*		Kohl Center • Madison, Wisconsin	BSW	Haider	W 3–0	8,919	8–4–3
December 3	7:00 PM	Colgate	#19	Cheel Arena • Potsdam, New York		Haider	W 2–1	2,669	9–4–3 (4–2–1)
December 4	7:00 PM	#9 Cornell	#19	Cheel Arena • Potsdam, New York		Haider	T 4–4 ^{SOW}	2,792	9–4–4 (4–2–2)
December 10	10:05 PM	at Arizona State*	#18	Oceanside Ice Arena • Tempe, Arizona		Haider	L 3–4	905	9–5–4
December 11	10:05 PM	at Arizona State*	#18	Oceanside Ice Arena • Tempe, Arizona		Haider	L 1–4	746	9–6–4
January 8	7:00 PM	at New Hampshire*		Whittemore Center • Durham, New Hampshire		Haider	L 1–5	3,213	9–7–4
January 15	7:00 PM	Union		Cheel Arena • Potsdam, New York		Mucitelli	W 8–2	2,336	10–7–4 (5–2–2)
January 16	7:00 PM	Rensselaer		Cheel Arena • Potsdam, New York		Haider	W 5–0	2,069	11–7–4 (6–2–2)
January 21	7:00 PM	at Dartmouth		Thompson Arena • Hanover, New Hampshire		Haider	T 5–5 ^{SOW}	160	11–7–5 (6–2–3)
January 22	7:00 PM	at #20 Harvard		Bright-Landry Hockey Center • Boston, Massachusetts		Haider	W 4–3	250	12–7–5 (7–2–3)
January 28	7:00 PM	St. Lawrence		Cheel Arena • Potsdam, New York		Mucitelli	W 1–0	3,224	13–7–5 (8–2–3)
January 29	7:00 PM	at St. Lawrence		Appleton Arena • Canton, New York		Mucitelli	T 4–4 ^{SOW}	2,285	13–7–6 (8–2–4)
February 4	7:00 PM	at Brown	#20	Meehan Auditorium • Providence, Rhode Island		Mucitelli	W 5–0	195	14–7–6 (9–2–4)
February 5	7:00 PM	at Yale	#20	Ingalls Rink • New Haven, Connecticut		Mucitelli	W 3–2	0	15–7–6 (10–2–4)
February 11	7:00 PM	Princeton	#19	Cheel Arena • Potsdam, New York		Mucitelli	W 7–1	2,339	16–7–6 (11–2–4)
February 12	7:00 PM	#2 Quinnipiac	#19	Cheel Arena • Potsdam, New York		Haider	W 3–1	2,654	17–7–6 (12–2–4)
February 18	7:00 PM	at Colgate	#15	Class of 1965 Arena • Hamilton, New York		Haider	W 4–1	996	18–7–6 (13–2–4)
February 19	7:00 PM	at #18 Cornell	#15	Lynah Rink • Ithaca, New York		Haider	L 2–6	3,918	18–8–6 (13–3–4)
February 25	7:00 PM	Yale	#17	Cheel Arena • Potsdam, New York		Haider	L 2–3 ^{OT}	2,300	18–9–6 (13–4–4)
February 26	7:00 PM	Brown	#17	Cheel Arena • Potsdam, New York		Mucitelli	W 4–0	2,429	19–9–6 (14–4–4)
ECAC Hockey Tournament
March 11	7:00 PM	Union*	#17	Cheel Arena • Potsdam, New York (Quarterfinal game 1)		Haider	W 3–2 ^{OT}	1,847	20–9–6
March 12	7:00 PM	Union*	#17	Cheel Arena • Potsdam, New York (Quarterfinal game 2)		Mucitelli	W 5–4 ^{OT}	2,077	21–9–6
Clarkson Won Series 2–0
March 18	7:30 PM	vs. #17 Harvard*	#14	Herb Brooks Arena • Lake Placid, New York (Semifinal)		Haider	L 3–5	4,256	21–10–6
*Non-conference game. ^{#}Rankings from USCHO.com Poll. All times are in Eastern Time. Source:

== Scoring statistics ==
Name	Position	Games	Goals	Assists	Points	PIM
Alex Campbell	C/LW	37	16	17	33	2
Mathieu Gosselin	RW	37	11	22	33	37
Zack Tsekos	C	35	15	16	31	21
Anthony Romano	C/RW	37	15	13	28	18
Ayrton Martino	LW	37	7	21	28	8
Jack Jacome	RW	32	2	23	25	22
Lukas Kälble	D	32	7	15	22	16
Noah Beck	D	37	5	17	22	24
Luke Santerno	F	31	12	5	17	18
Anthony Callin	F	21	4	12	16	2
Jordan Power	D	36	4	9	13	28
Ryan Richardson	LW	37	3	10	13	43
Luke Mobley	F	36	0	11	11	54
Nick Campoli	C	34	5	2	7	10
Tommy Pasanen	D	28	3	4	7	12
Michael Underwood	D	35	2	5	7	26
Brian Hurley	D	24	2	4	6	4
Dustyn McFaul	D	34	2	4	6	24
Chris Klack	C	31	4	0	4	16
George Grannis	F	18	1	3	4	10
Kaelan Taylor	D	26	0	4	4	8
Jamie Collins	F	20	2	0	2	4
Jordan Robert	F	2	1	0	1	0
Brady Parker	G	1	0	0	0	0
Charlie Campbell	F	3	0	0	0	0
Jacob Mucitelli	G	10	0	0	0	0
Ethan Haider	G	29	0	0	0	0
Bench	-	-	-	-	-	2
Total			123	217	340	409

== Goaltending statistics ==
Name	Games	Minutes	Wins	Losses	Ties	Goals against	Saves	Shut outs	SV %	GAA
Brady Parker	1	0:36	0	0	0	0	0	0	-	0.00
Jacob Mucitelli	10	554	8	0	1	12	203	3	.944	1.30
Ethan Haider	29	1680	13	10	5	67	664	3	.908	2.39
Empty Net	-	25	-	-	-	6	-	-	-	-
Total	37	2261	21	10	6	85	867	6	.911	2.26

== Rankings ==
Poll	Week																									
Poll	Pre	1	2	3	4	5	6	7	8	9	10	11	12	13	14	15	16	17	18	19	20	21	22	23	24	25 (Final)
USCHO.com	19	20	NR	NR	NR	NR	NR	NR	NR	19	18	NR	NR	NR	NR	NR	20	19	15	17	18	17	14	17	-	17
USA Today	NR	NR	NR	NR	NR	NR	NR	NR	NR	NR	NR	NR	NR	NR	NR	NR	NR	NR	15	NR	NR	NR	15	NR	NR	NR

Note: USCHO did not release a poll in week 24.

== Awards and honors ==
Player	Award	Ref
Zach Teskos	ECAC Hockey Best Defensive Forward	
Alex Campbell	ECAC Hockey First Team	
Mathieu Gosselin	ECAC Hockey First Team	
Noah Beck	ECAC Hockey Second Team	
Zach Tsekos	ECAC Hockey Second Team	
Lukas Kälble	ECAC Hockey Third Team	
Ayrton Martino	ECAC Hockey Rookie Team	

== Players drafted into the NHL ==
=== 2022 NHL entry draft ===
Round	Pick	Player	NHL team
4	112	Daimon Gardner^{†}	Vancouver Canucks
6	162	Emmett Croteau^{†}	Montreal Canadiens

† incoming freshman
