= 2024–25 Brown Bears men's ice hockey season =

Ice hockey season

- Conference: 8th ECAC Hockey
- Home ice: Meehan Auditorium

Rankings
- USCHO: NR
- USA Hockey: NR

Record
- Overall: 14–15–3
- Conference: 9–11–2
- Home: 8–6–3
- Road: 6–9–0

Coaches and captains
- Head coach: Brendan Whittet
- Assistant coaches: Jason Smith; Matt Plante
- Captain(s): Tony Andreozzi; Max Scott
- Alternate captain(s): Brett Bliss; Alex Pineau

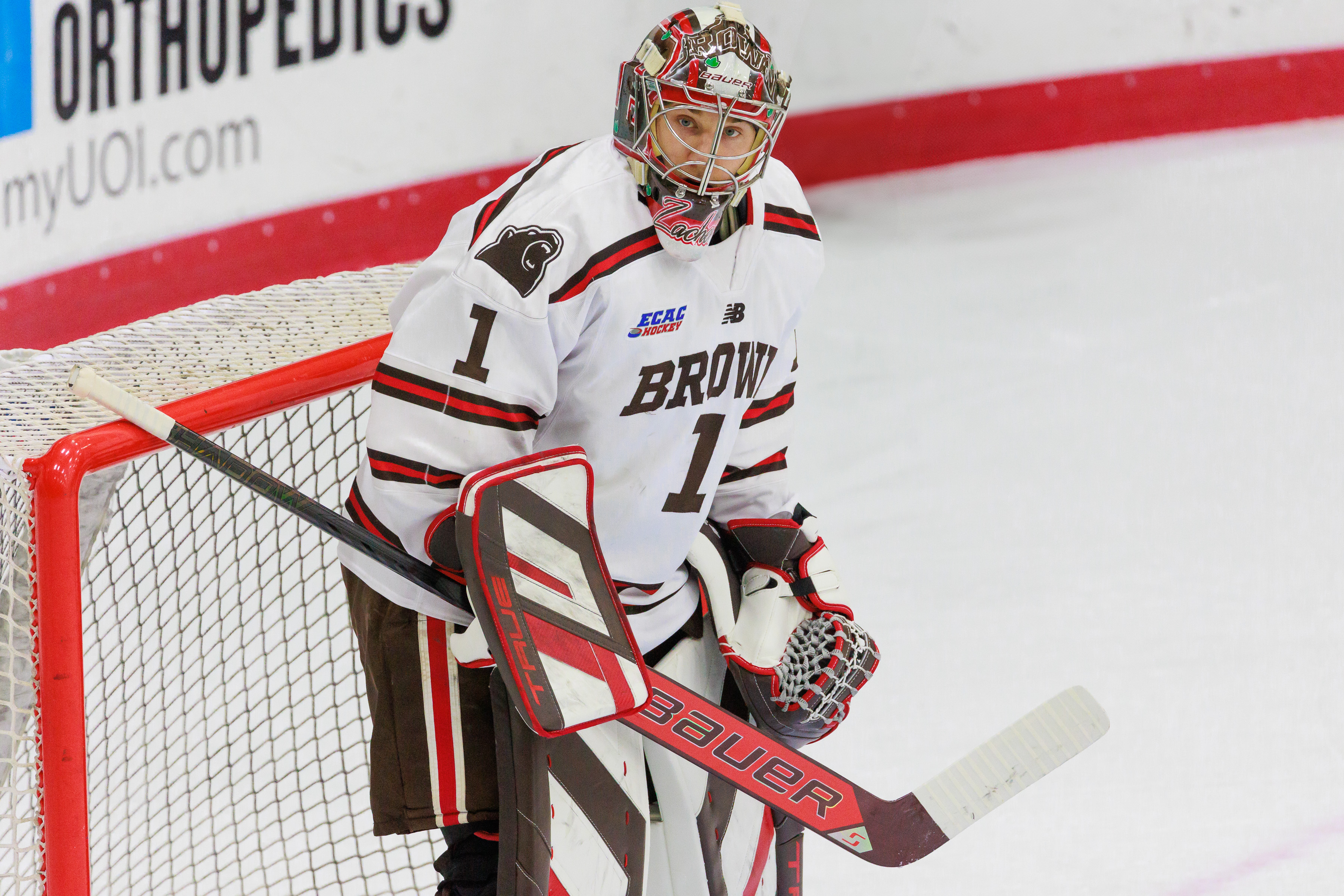
Goaltender Lawton Zacher was a semifinalist for the Mike Richter Award, as well as a nominee for the Hobey Baker Award.

The 2024–25 Brown Bears Men's ice hockey season was the 107th season of play for the program and the 63rd in the ECAC Hockey conference. The Bears represented Brown University, played their home games at the Meehan Auditorium and were coached by Brendan Whittet in his 15th season.

== Season ==
Throughout the season, Brown was essentially average. Their pedestrian offense was a marked improvement from the year before scoring nearly an extra goal every other game. Additionally, the defense saw a better performance as well with Lawton Zacher making a tremendous stride in his sophomore campaign. Playing better on both sides of the puck led to the Bears alternating winning and losing streaks for most of the year. In every month the team played, Brown finished with the exact same number of wins and losses, a rather extraordinary achievement considering the Bears lost their first 5 games in January only to finish on a 5-game winning streak. Continuing the theme of even play, Brown also finished their schedule with the exact same number of goals scored and goals allowed, 75.

By the end of the regular season, the team sat eighth in the standings, just good enough to earn its first postseason home game in six years. Coincidentally, they met the same team when they kicked off their playoff run against Princeton. After falling down in the first period, Brown rode a 3-point effort from Ryan St. Louis to victory and advance to the quarterfinals for the first time since that auspicious year in 2019. Next on their slate was league champion Quinnipiac who gave the Bears very little room to maneuver. In the two games, Brown was only able to score a single goal when they were playing at 6-on-4. After being outclassed in the series, the two losses dropped Brown to below .500 for the season, however, the team was still able to post its best result in six years.

== Departures ==
Player	Position	Nationality	Cause
Ryan Bottrill	Forward	United States	Transferred to Clarkson
Stephen Chen	Goaltender	China	Left program (joined national team)
Gavin Puskar	Forward	United States	Graduation (retired)
Matt Sutton	Forward	United States	Graduation (retired)
Jordan Tonelli	Forward	United States	Graduate transfer to Rensselaer
Jacob Zacharewicz	Goaltender	United States	Transferred to Western Michigan

== Recruiting ==
Player	Position	Nationality	Age	Notes
Charlie Gollob	Forward	Canada	20	Toronto, ON
Tanner Hartman	Forward	United States	22	Chicago, IL; transfer from Hobart
Jack Hewitt	Defenseman	United States	21	Toronto, ON
Ryan Kazmouz	Goaltender	United States	21	Livonia, MI; already completed one year of classes
Andrew King	Goaltender	United States	21	Dubuque, IA
Brian Nicholas	Forward	United States	19	Scarsdale, NY
Leo Schwartz	Defenseman	United States	19	New York, NY
Ivan Zadvernyuk	Forward	Russia	20	Moscow, RUS
Tristan Zarsky	Defenseman	Canada	21	Edmonton, AB

== Roster ==
As of July 30, 2024.

No.	Nat.	Player	Class	Pos	Height	Weight	DoB	Hometown	Previous team	NHL rights
1	(United States)	Lawton Zacher	Sophomore	G	6' 2" (1.88 m)	180 lb (82 kg)	2003-12-31	Buffalo, New York	Minot Minotauros (NAHL)	—
2	(Canada)	Tristan Zarsky	Freshman	D	6' 3" (1.91 m)	209 lb (95 kg)	2003-01-09	Edmonton, Alberta	El Paso Rhinos (NAHL)	—
3	(Canada)	Alex Pineau (A)	Sophomore	D	6' 3" (1.91 m)	205 lb (93 kg)	2003-01-21	Thunder Bay, Ontario	Des Moines Buccaneers (USHL)	—
4	(United States)	Brett Bliss (A)	Senior	D	6' 2" (1.88 m)	190 lb (86 kg)	2001-12-29	Chelmsford, Massachusetts	Surrey Eagles (BCHL)	—
5	(United States)	Nick Traggio	Junior	D	6' 2" (1.88 m)	210 lb (95 kg)	2001-08-01	Sharon, Connecticut	Bonnyville Pontiacs (AJHL)	—
6	(United States)	Harry Meirowitz	Junior	D	6' 0" (1.83 m)	185 lb (84 kg)	2003-05-21	Old Westbury, New York	P.A.L. Jr. Islanders (NCDC)	—
7	(Canada)	Charlie Gollob	Freshman	F	6' 2" (1.88 m)	201 lb (91 kg)	2004-02-10	Toronto, Ontario	Victoria Grizzlies (BCHL)	—
8	(Canada)	Ryan Shostak	Junior	F	6' 0" (1.83 m)	190 lb (86 kg)	2001-09-08	Calgary, Alberta	Vernon Vipers (BCHL)	—
9	(United States)	Ryan St. Louis	Junior	F	5' 10" (1.78 m)	170 lb (77 kg)	2003-06-13	Old Greenwich, Connecticut	Dubuque Fighting Saints (USHL)	—
10	(Russia)	Ivan Zadvernyuk	Freshman	F	6' 3" (1.91 m)	190 lb (86 kg)	2004-04-12	Moscow, Russia	Lone Star Brahmas (NAHL)	—
11	(United States)	Tyler Kopff	Sophomore	F	6' 4" (1.93 m)	205 lb (93 kg)	2003-04-22	Ridgewood, New Jersey	Coquitlam Express (BCHL)	—
12	(United States)	Max Scott (C)	Sophomore	F	6' 0" (1.83 m)	185 lb (84 kg)	2002-10-11	San Jose, California	North Iowa Bulls (NAHL)	—
13	(Canada)	Lynden Grandberg	Senior	F	6' 0" (1.83 m)	173 lb (78 kg)	2001-05-21	Calgary, Alberta	Camrose Kodiaks (AJHL)	—
14	(United States)	Spence Evans	Senior	D	6' 3" (1.91 m)	195 lb (88 kg)	2002-04-29	Oyster Bay Cove, New York	Johnstown Tomahawks (NAHL)	—
15	(United States)	Tony Andreozzi (C)	Senior	D	5' 11" (1.8 m)	190 lb (86 kg)	2000-04-16	Winchester, Massachusetts	Salmon Arm Silverbacks (BCHL)	—
16	(United States)	Thomas Manty	Senior	F	5' 10" (1.78 m)	175 lb (79 kg)	2000-02-04	Andover, Massachusetts	Aberdeen Wings (NAHL)	—
17	(United States)	Mike Cataldo	Sophomore	F	6' 1" (1.85 m)	200 lb (91 kg)	2003-05-04	Norfolk, Massachusetts	Bonnyville Pontiacs (AJHL)	—
18	(United States)	Dean Bauchiero	Junior	F	6' 4" (1.93 m)	215 lb (98 kg)	2002-03-04	Southington, Connecticut	Wichita Falls Warriors (NAHL)	—
19	(United States)	Matthew Brille	Sophomore	F	5' 10" (1.78 m)	180 lb (82 kg)	2003-01-02	Bethesda, Maryland	Chippewa Steel (NAHL)	—
20	(Canada)	Noah Wakeford	Senior	F	5' 8" (1.73 m)	175 lb (79 kg)	2000-06-29	Okotoks, Alberta	Trail Smoke Eaters (BCHL)	—
21	(United States)	Wyatt Schlaht	Senior	F	6' 2" (1.88 m)	200 lb (91 kg)	2000-06-04	Cherry Hills Village, Colorado	Surrey Eagles (BCHL)	—
22	(Canada)	Ethan Mistry	Sophomore	D	5' 10" (1.78 m)	175 lb (79 kg)	2003-02-04	Toronto, Ontario	Nanaimo Clippers (BCHL)	—
23	(Canada)	Jackson Munro	Senior	D	5' 11" (1.8 m)	180 lb (82 kg)	2000-02-11	Vancouver, British Columbia	Chilliwack Chiefs (BCHL)	—
24	(United States)	Brenden Clark	Senior	F	6' 0" (1.83 m)	185 lb (84 kg)	2002-01-16	Morris Plains, New Jersey	Johnstown Tomahawks (NAHL)	—
25	(United States)	Zackary Tonelli	Junior	F	5' 9" (1.75 m)	170 lb (77 kg)	2002-02-14	Greenwich, Connecticut	Vernon Vipers (BCHL)	—
26	(United States)	Leo Schwartz	Freshman	F	6' 0" (1.83 m)	174 lb (79 kg)	2004-10-05	New York, New York	New Jersey Titans (NAHL)	—
27	(Canada)	Jack Hewitt	Freshman	D	5' 11" (1.8 m)	176 lb (80 kg)	2003-07-01	Toronto, Ontario	P.A.L. Jr. Islanders (NCDC)	—
28	(United States)	Tanner Hartman	Junior	F	6' 0" (1.83 m)	168 lb (76 kg)	2001-10-10	Chicago, Illinois	Hobart (NEHC)	—
29	(United States)	Andrew King	Freshman	F	6' 0" (1.83 m)	165 lb (75 kg)	2003-04-28	Dubuque, Iowa	Dubuque Fighting Saints (USHL)	—
31	(United States)	Ryan Kazmouz	Sophomore	G	6' 0" (1.83 m)	170 lb (77 kg)	2003-08-30	Livonia, Michigan	Saint Sebastian's School (US-Prep)	—
35	(United States)	Tyler Shea	Junior	G	5' 11" (1.8 m)	170 lb (77 kg)	2001-08-03	Stevenson Ranch, California	Michigan (Big Ten)	—
55	(United States)	Brian Nicholas	Freshman	F	6' 1" (1.85 m)	192 lb (87 kg)	2005-03-15	Scarsdale, New York	Sioux City Musketeers (USHL)	—

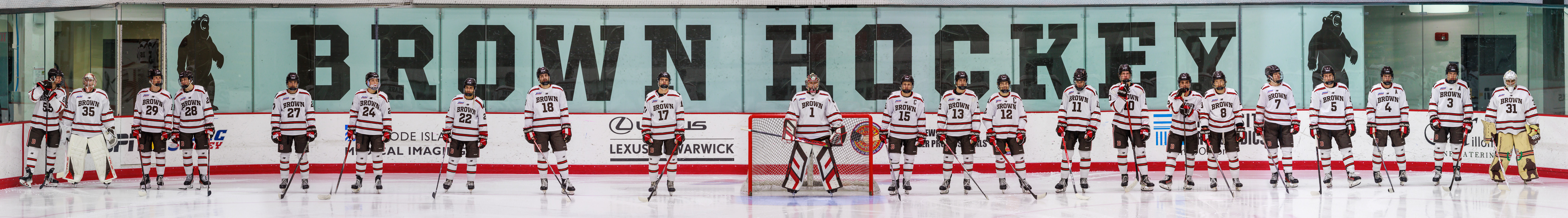
2024-25 Bears

== Standings ==
2024–25 ECAC Hockey Standings
	Conference record										Overall record					
	GP	W	L	T	OTW	OTL	SW	PTS	GF	GA	GP	W	L	T	GF	GA
#15 Quinnipiac †	22	16	5	1	2	3	0	50	79	42	38	24	12	2	135	83
#20 Clarkson	22	15	6	1	2	1	0	45	74	47	39	24	12	3	121	87
Colgate	22	13	7	2	2	2	1	42	80	65	36	18	15	3	114	116
Union	22	12	8	2	0	0	2	40	67	61	36	19	14	3	112	109
Dartmouth	22	12	9	1	0	2	0	39	70	52	33	18	13	2	110	84
#12 Cornell *	22	10	8	4	1	0	3	36	69	53	36	19	11	6	112	82
Harvard	22	9	10	3	2	2	1	31	56	56	33	13	17	3	85	97
Brown	22	9	11	2	3	0	2	28	53	63	32	14	15	3	79	85
Princeton	22	7	12	3	2	2	1	25	55	73	30	12	15	3	71	86
Rensselaer	22	7	15	0	0	2	0	23	57	82	35	12	21	2	101	131
Yale	22	5	14	3	1	1	1	19	52	80	30	6	21	3	67	121
St. Lawrence	22	5	15	2	1	1	1	18	43	81	35	9	24	2	71	121
Championship: March 22, 2025 † indicates conference regular season champion (Cleary Cup) * indicates conference tournament champion (Whitelaw Cup); Rankings: USCHO.com Top 20 Poll

== Schedule and results ==
Date	Time	Opponent^{#}	Rank^{#}	Site	TV	Decision	Result	Attendance	Record
Regular Season
November 8	7:00 pm	at Colgate		Class of 1965 Arena • Hamilton, New York	ESPN+	Zacher	L 3–5	1,234	0–1–0 (0–1–0)
November 9	7:00 pm	at #6 Cornell		Lynah Rink • Ithaca, New York	ESPN+	Shea	L 1–3	4,267	0–2–0 (0–2–0)
November 15	7:00 pm	#19 Quinnipiac		Meehan Auditorium • Providence, Rhode Island	ESPN+	Shea	L 2–3	907	0–3–0 (0–3–0)
November 16	7:00 pm	Princeton		Meehan Auditorium • Providence, Rhode Island	ESPN+	Zacher	T 1–1 ^{SOW}	1,095	0–3–1 (0–3–1)
November 22	7:00 pm	at #19 Clarkson		Cheel Arena • Potsdam, New York	ESPN+	Zacher	W 1–0	2,648	1–3–1 (1–3–1)
November 23	7:00 pm	at St. Lawrence		Appleton Arena • Canton, New York	ESPN+	Zacher	W 2–1 ^{OT}	1,042	2–3–1 (2–3–1)
November 29	7:00 pm	Air Force*		Meehan Auditorium • Providence, Rhode Island	ESPN+	Zacher	T 2–2 ^{OT}	1,054	2–3–2
November 30	4:00 pm	Air Force*		Meehan Auditorium • Providence, Rhode Island	ESPN+	Zacher	W 5–2	972	3–3–2
December 7	7:00 pm	at Northeastern*		Matthews Arena • Boston, Massachusetts	ESPN+	Zacher	L 3–4	2,009	3–4–2
December 29	2:00 pm	Long Island*		Meehan Auditorium • Providence, Rhode Island	ESPN+	Zacher	W 3–0	982	4–4–2
January 3	7:00 pm	Union		Meehan Auditorium • Providence, Rhode Island	ESPN+	Zacher	L 1–3	844	4–5–2 (2–4–1)
January 4	7:00 pm	Rensselaer		Meehan Auditorium • Providence, Rhode Island	ESPN+	Zacher	L 3–4	1,043	4–6–2 (2–5–1)
January 7	7:00 pm	#5 Providence*		Meehan Auditorium • Providence, Rhode Island (Mayor's Cup)	ESPN+	Shea	L 0–2	1,793	4–7–2
January 10	7:00 pm	at Harvard		Bright-Landry Hockey Center • Boston, Massachusetts	ESPN+	Zacher	L 1–3	1,938	4–8–2 (2–6–1)
January 11	7:00 pm	at Dartmouth		Thompson Arena • Hanover, New Hampshire	ESPN+	Zacher	L 2–5	2,648	4–9–2 (2–7–1)
January 17	7:00 pm	St. Lawrence		Meehan Auditorium • Providence, Rhode Island	ESPN+	Zacher	W 3–2	1,072	5–9–2 (3–7–1)
January 18	7:00 pm	#20 Clarkson		Meehan Auditorium • Providence, Rhode Island	ESPN+	Zacher	W 4–2	1,112	6–9–2 (4–7–1)
January 21	7:00 pm	at Merrimack*		J. Thom Lawler Rink • North Andover, Massachusetts	ESPN+	Zacher	W 5–1	1,758	7–9–2
January 26	7:00 pm	Stonehill*		Meehan Auditorium • Providence, Rhode Island	ESPN+	Zacher	W 5–2	1,219	8–9–2
January 31	7:00 pm	at Rensselaer		Houston Field House • Troy, New York	ESPN+	Zacher	W 6–5 ^{OT}	1,475	9–9–2 (5–7–1)
February 1	7:00 pm	at Union		Achilles Rink • Schenectady, New York	ESPN+	Shea	L 1–2	1,986	9–10–2 (5–8–1)
February 6	7:00 pm	at Yale		Ingalls Rink • New Haven, Connecticut	ESPN+	Zacher	W 2–1	1,599	10–10–2 (6–8–1)
February 9	2:00 pm	Yale		Meehan Auditorium • Providence, Rhode Island	ESPN+	Zacher	W 5–1	982	11–10–2 (7–8–1)
February 14	7:00 pm	Cornell		Meehan Auditorium • Providence, Rhode Island	ESPN+	Zacher	L 1–6	1,375	11–11–2 (7–9–1)
February 15	7:00 pm	Colgate		Meehan Auditorium • Providence, Rhode Island	ESPN+	Zacher	W 6–3	877	12–11–2 (8–9–1)
February 21	7:00 pm	at Princeton		Hobey Baker Memorial Rink • Princeton, New Jersey	ESPN+	Zacher	W 3–2 ^{OT}	1,648	13–11–2 (9–9–1)
February 22	7:00 pm	at #14 Quinnipiac		M&T Bank Arena • Hamden, Connecticut	ESPN+	Zacher	L 0–4	3,335	13–12–2 (9–10–1)
February 28	7:00 pm	Dartmouth		Meehan Auditorium • Providence, Rhode Island	ESPN+	Zacher	L 2–4	987	13–13–2 (9–11–1)
March 1	7:00 pm	Harvard		Meehan Auditorium • Providence, Rhode Island	ESPN+	Shea	T 3–3 ^{SOW}	1,627	13–13–3 (9–11–2)
ECAC Hockey Tournament
March 7	7:00 pm	Princeton*		Meehan Auditorium • Providence, Rhode Island (ECAC First Round)	ESPN+	Zacher	W 3–2	1,742	14–13–3
March 14	7:00 pm	at #13 Quinnipiac*		M&T Bank Arena • Hamden, Connecticut (ECAC Quarterfinal Game 1)	ESPN+	Zacher	L 1–4	2,512	14–14–3
March 15	4:00 pm	at #13 Quinnipiac*		M&T Bank Arena • Hamden, Connecticut (ECAC Quarterfinal Game 2)	ESPN+	Zacher	L 0–4	2,772	14–15–3
*Non-conference game. ^{#}Rankings from USCHO.com Poll. All times are in Eastern Time. Source:

== Scoring statistics ==
Name	Position	Games	Goals	Assists	Points	PIM
Ryan St. Louis	LW	32	11	18	29	2
Tyler Kopff	F	32	9	19	28	12
Max Scott	F	32	12	14	26	21
Brian Nicholas	F	28	11	14	25	10
Alex Pineau	D	32	7	9	16	14
Brendan Clark	F	31	6	6	12	30
Ethan Mistry	D	32	2	10	12	6
Ivan Zadvernyuk	F	32	3	7	10	33
Charlie Gollob	C	27	4	5	9	29
Tony Andreozzi	D	32	1	6	7	6
Ryan Shostak	F	32	3	3	6	14
Brett Bliss	D	31	1	4	5	10
Nick Traggio	D	26	1	3	4	10
Dean Bauchiero	W	18	3	0	3	19
Tanner Hartman	F	23	1	2	3	6
Mike Cataldo	C	28	1	2	3	4
Zackary Tonelli	F	25	2	0	2	6
Leo Schwartz	D	20	0	2	2	6
Lynden Grandberg	F	20	1	0	1	4
Thomas Manty	W	7	0	1	1	0
Jack Hewitt	D	12	0	1	1	2
Andrew King	F	14	0	1	1	0
Noah Wakeford	F	2	0	0	0	0
Matthew Brille	F	4	0	0	0	2
Wyatt Schlaht	F	11	0	0	0	2
Spencer Evans	D	13	0	0	0	2
Tristan Zarsky	D	20	0	0	0	6
Tyler Shea	G	6	0	0	0	0
Lawton Zacher	G	28	0	0	0	0
Bench	–	–	–	–	–	18
Total			79	127	206	276

== Goaltending statistics ==
Name	Games	Minutes	Wins	Losses	Ties	Goals against	Saves	Shut outs	SV %	GAA
Tyler Shea	6	297:03	0	4	1	10	146	0	.936	2.02
Lawton Zacher	26	1618:00	14	11	2	67	745	2	.917	2.48
Empty Net	-	26:12	-	-	-	8	-	-	-	-
Total	32	1941:15	14	15	3	85	891	2	.913	2.63

== Rankings ==
Poll	Week																											
Poll	Pre	1	2	3	4	5	6	7	8	9	10	11	12	13	14	15	16	17	18	19	20	21	22	23	24	25	26	27 (Final)
USCHO.com	NR	NR	NR	NR	NR	NR	NR	NR	NR	NR	NR	NR	–	NR	NR	NR	NR	NR	NR	NR	NR	NR	NR	NR	NR	NR	–	NR
USA Hockey	NR	NR	NR	NR	NR	NR	NR	NR	NR	NR	NR	NR	–	NR	NR	NR	NR	NR	NR	NR	NR	NR	NR	NR	NR	NR	NR	NR

Note: USCHO did not release a poll in week 12 or 26.
Note: USA Hockey did not release a poll in week 12.

== Awards and honors ==
Player	Award	Ref
Lawton Zacher	All-ECAC Hockey Second Team	
Tyler Kopff	All-ECAC Hockey Third Team	
Brian Nicholas	ECAC Hockey All-Rookie Team	
