= 2022 ECAC Hockey men's ice hockey tournament =

2022 ECAC Men's ice hockey tournament
- Dates: March 4–19, 2022
- Teams: 12
- Finals site: Herb Brooks Arena; Lake Placid, New York
- Champions: Harvard (11th title)
- Winning coach: Ted Donato (4th title)
- MVP: Matthew Coronato (Harvard)
- ECAC Men's Ice Hockey Tournaments

The 2022 ECAC Hockey Men's Ice Hockey Tournament was the 61st tournament in league history. It was played between March 4 and March 19, 2022. By winning the tournament, Harvard received an automatic bid to the 2022 NCAA Division I Men's Ice Hockey Tournament.

== Format ==
The tournament features four rounds of play. The teams that finish above fifth place in the standings received a bye to the quarterfinal round. In the first round, the fifth and twelfth seeds, the sixth and eleventh seeds, the seventh and tenth seeds and the eighth and ninth seeds played a best-of-three series with the winners advancing to the quarterfinals. In the quarterfinals the one seed played the lowest remaining seed, the second seed played the second-lowest remaining seed, the third seed played the third-lowest remaining seed and the fourth seed played the fourth-lowest remaining seed in another best-of-three series with the winners of these the series advancing to the semifinals. In the semifinals the top remaining seed played the lowest remaining seed while the two remaining teams play against each other. The winners of the semifinals play in the championship game, and no third-place game is played. All series after the quarterfinals are single-elimination games. The tournament champion receives an automatic bid to the 2022 NCAA Division I Men's Ice Hockey Tournament.

== Conference standings ==
2021–22 ECAC Hockey Standings
	Conference record										Overall record					
	GP	W	L	T	OTW	OTL	3/SW	PTS	GF	GA	GP	W	L	T	GF	GA
#8 Quinnipiac †	22	17	4	1	0	1	1	54	71	14	42	32	7	3	139	53
#17 Clarkson	22	14	4	4	0	2	3	51	86	47	37	21	10	6	123	85
#15 Harvard *	22	14	6	2	0	0	2	46	69	46	35	21	11	3	116	82
Cornell	22	12	6	4	2	1	0	39	73	47	32	18	10	4	100	72
Colgate	22	9	9	4	1	0	3	33	55	57	40	18	18	4	111	112
Rensselaer	22	10	12	0	0	0	0	30	58	63	44	18	23	3	114	119
Union	22	9	11	2	3	1	0	27	52	66	37	14	19	4	89	110
St. Lawrence	22	7	10	5	2	0	2	26	44	60	37	11	19	7	72	110
Brown	22	6	12	4	0	1	2	25	36	61	31	7	20	4	50	100
Princeton	22	7	14	1	0	1	0	23	54	89	31	8	21	2	70	122
Yale	22	7	14	1	3	1	1	21	38	60	30	8	21	1	55	90
Dartmouth	22	5	15	2	0	3	1	21	45	71	32	7	22	3	69	110
Championship: March 19, 2022 † indicates conference regular season champion (Cleary Cup) * indicates conference tournament champion (Whitelaw Cup); Rankings: USCHO.com Top 20 Poll

== Bracket ==
First Round; March 4–6
5	Colgate	3*	5	-
12	Yale	2	1	-
6	Rensselaer	2	3	5
11	Dartmouth	3	2	3
7	Union	3	5	-
10	Princeton	2	1	-
8	St. Lawrence	4	1	4*
9	Brown	1	2*	3

Quarterfinals; March 11–13
1	Quinnipiac	4	4**	-
8	St. Lawrence	1	3	-
2	Clarkson	3*	4*	-
7	Union	2	3	-
3	Harvard	4*	3	3
6	Rensselaer	3	4**	1
4	Cornell	3	2	1
5	Colgate	1	4	2

Semifinals; March 18
1	Quinnipiac	3
5	Colgate	1
2	Clarkson	3
3	Harvard	5

Championship; March 19
1	Quinnipiac	2
3	Harvard	3*

Note: * denotes overtime periods

== Results ==
Note: All game times are local.

=== First round ===
==== (5) Colgate vs. (12) Yale ====
March 4, 2022; 7:00 PM	Colgate	3 – 2 (OT) (0–0, 2–1, 0–1, 1–0)	Yale	Class of 1965 Arena; Attendance: 1,002

Game reference

Mitch Benson
Goalies
Nathan Reid
Referees:
Joseph Carusone
Anthony Kenney
Linesmen:
Brian Oliver
JP Waleski

(unassisted) Colton Young (14) – 32:33	1–0
	1–1	16:56 – Reilly Connors (4) (Young, Conroy)
(Verboon, A. Young) Colton Young (15) – PP – 39:08	2–1
	2–2	59:53 – EA – Teddy Wooding (6) (Allain)
(Brandon) Josh McKechney (14) – GW – 76:52	3–2

6 min
Penalties
2 min
34
Shots
34

March 5, 2022; 7:00 PM	Colgate	5 – 1 (1–0, 1–1, 3–0)	Yale	Class of 1965 Arena; Attendance: 848

Game reference

Mitch Benson
Goalies
Nathan Reid
Referees:
Chris Pitoscia
Kevin Graber
Linesmen:
Jordan Patarino
Rick Lembo

(Lunn, Stark) Paul McAvoy (2) – 13:32	1–0
(Stewart) Arnaud Vachon (6) – GW – 23:12	2–0
	2–1	24:49 – PP – Dylan Herzog (6) (Ong, Sullivan)
(unassisted) Griffin Lunn (11) – 41:35	3–1
(Lunn, McAvoy) Matt Verboon (7) – EN – 57:55	4–1
(DiPaolo) Ross Mitton (14) – EN – 58:34	5–1

18 min
Penalties
8 min
24
Shots
30

Colgate Won Series 2–0

==== (6) Rensselaer vs. (11) Dartmouth ====
March 4, 2022; 7:00 PM	Rensselaer	2 – 3 (2–2, 0–1, 0–0)	Dartmouth	Houston Field House; Attendance: 800

Game reference

Jack Watson
Goalies
Clay Stevenson
Referees:
William Brennan III
Chip McDonald
Linesmen:
Patrick Dapuzzo
Michael Noeth

	0–1	00:53 – Sean Chisholm (6) (Pierce, Gallant)
(Baxter, Kjellberg) Justin Addamo (12) – 01:08	1–1
	1–2	16:01 – Mark Gallant (11) (Chisholm, Palocsik)
(Sertti, Hallbauer) Justin Addamo (13) – 16:29	2–2
	2–3	36:55 – GW – Jeff Losurdo (6) (Chisholm, Unruh)

6 min
Penalties
2 min
38
Shots
20

March 5, 2022; 7:00 PM	Rensselaer	3 – 2 (1–0, 1–0, 1–2)	Dartmouth	Houston Field House; Attendance: 851

Game reference

Jack Watson
Goalies
Clay Stevenson
Referees:
Tom Dellafranco
Joe Carusone
Linesmen:
Adam Wood
Rick Lembo

(Gagnon, Dubinsky) Simon Kjellberg (6) – 08:17	1–0
(Leppänen, Linden) Jakub Lacka (13) – PP – 30:43	2–0
	2–1	06:05 – Ryan Sorkin (6) (Cameron, Palocsik)
(Linden) Mason Klee (2) – GW – 54:08	3–1
	3–2	54:57 – Harrison Markell (2) ( Hubbarde, Pierce)

10 min
Penalties
12 min
31
Shots
23

March 6, 2022; 4:00 PM	Rensselaer	5 – 3 (0–1, 1–2, 4–0)	Dartmouth	Houston Field House; Attendance: 579

Game reference

Jack Watson
Goalies
Clay Stevenson
Referees:
Brad Leblanc
Cameron Lynch
Linesmen:
Adam Wood
Michael Wrobel

	0–1	06:05 – Matt Hubbarde (6) (Musa, Palocsik)
	0–2	28:12 – Ryan Sorkin (3) (Pierce, Dorfman)
(Dubinsky, Mahshie) Simon Kjellberg (7) – PP – 31:12	1–2
	1–3	39:55 – Braiden Dorfman (8) (Chisholm, Pierce)
(Baxter, Mahshie) Simon Kjellberg (8) – PP – 46:37	2–3
(unassisted) Zach Dubinsky (9) – 52:02	3–3
(Kjellberg, Baxter) Ryan Mahshie (7) – GW PP – 56:04	4–3
(Leppänen) Ture Linden (18) – PP EN – 59:11	5–3

6 min
Penalties
10 min
30
Shots
23

Rensselaer Won Series 2–1

==== (7) Union vs. (10) Princeton ====
March 4, 2022; 7:00 PM	Union	3 – 2 (1–0, 0–1, 2–1)	Princeton	Achilles Center; Attendance: 1,473

Game reference

Connor Murphy
Goalies
Jérémie Forget
Referees:
Chris Pitoscia
Jason Williams
Linesmen:
Adam Wood
Brendon Wormley

(Farris, Adams) Matt Allen (2) – 02:22	1–0
	1–1	30:56 – Liam Gorman (3) (O'Neill, Cronin)
(Anhorn, Robertson) Gabriel Seger (7) – PP – 50:32	2–1
(Farris, Anhorn) Brandon Estes (7) – GW – 57:26	3–1
	3–2	58:45 – EA – Noah de la Durantaye (3) (Robbins, Kersten)

4 min
Penalties
6 min
37
Shots
26

March 5, 2022; 4:00 PM	Union	5 – 1 (1–0, 1–0, 3–1)	Princeton	Achilles Center; Attendance: 1,435

Game reference

Connor Murphy
Goalies
Jérémie Forget
Referees:
Cameron Lynch
Brad Leblanc
Linesmen:
Jason Shattie
Michael Wrobel

(Anhorn, Sidorski) Caden Villegas (3) – 12:45	1–0
(unassisted) Liam Robertson (13) – GW – 30:37	2–0
(unassisted) Collin Graf (10) – 50:25	3–0
(Smedsrud, Anhorn) Collin Graf (11) – PP – 52:59	4–0
(Robertson, Estes) Chaz Smedsrud (5) – 57:41	5–0
	5–1	59:17 – PP – Corey Andonovski (10) (O'Neill, de la Durantaye)

19 min
Penalties
17 min
37
Shots
30

Union Won Series 2–0

==== (8) St. Lawrence vs. (9) Brown ====
March 4, 2022; 7:00 PM	St. Lawrence	4 – 1 (1–0, 1–0, 2–1)	Brown	Appleton Arena; Attendance: 1,142

Game reference

Emil Zetterquist
Goalies
Mathieu Caron
Referees:
CJ Hanafin
Tom Steinel
Linesmen:
Stephen Drain
Ryan Knapp

(Trela, Ritchie) Josh Boyer (2) – 02:26	1–0
	1–1	25:36 – PP – Justin Jallen (9) (Krys, Niinisaari)
(unassisted) Aleksi Peltonen (3) – GW – 28:58	2–1
(Peltonen, Waite) Max Dorrington (8) – 55:43	3–1
(Steinmetz, Peltonen) Justin Paul (7) – EN – 58:23	4–1

10 min
Penalties
23 min
26
Shots
22

March 5, 2022; 7:00 PM	St. Lawrence	1 – 2 (OT) (1–1, 0–0, 0–0, 0–1)	Brown	Appleton Arena; Attendance: 1,265

Game reference

Emil Zetterquist
Goalies
Mathieu Caron
Referees:
CJ Hanafin
Tom Steinel
Linesmen:
Stephen Drain
Ryan Knapp

(Pickering, Chapleau) David Jankowski (4) – 18:41	1–0
	1–1	20:00 – Luke Krys (3) (Schlaht, Crozier)
	1–2	62:06 – GW – Justin Jallen (9) (Crozier, Bliss)

4 min
Penalties
4 min
26
Shots
28

March 6, 2022; 4:00 PM	St. Lawrence	4 – 3 (OT) (1–2, 1–1, 1–0, 1–0)	Brown	Appleton Arena; Attendance: 894

Game reference

Emil Zetterquist
Goalies
Mathieu Caron
Referees:
Joe Carusone
Tom Dellafranco
Linesmen:
Rick Lembo
Jason Sahttie

	0–1	12:29 – PP – Michael Maloney (10) (Crossman, Bliss)
	0–2	17:15 – Jordan Tonelli (3) (Bliss, Schlaht)
(Chapleau, Waite) Justin Paul (8) – 18:35	1–2
	1–3	31:11 – SH – Tristan Crozier (9) (unassisted)
(Waite, Paul) Ty Naaykens (4) – PP – 31:39	2–3
(Erickson, Boyer) Cameron Buhl (4) – 51:51	3–3
(Fry, Steinmetz) Reilly Moran (5) – GW – 60:46	4–3

21 min
Penalties
6 min
30
Shots
25

St. Lawrence Won Series 2–1

=== Quarterfinals ===
==== (1) Quinnipiac vs. (8) St. Lawrence ====
March 11, 2022; 7:00 PM	Quinnipiac	4 – 1 (1–0, 2–0, 1–1)	St. Lawrence	People's United Center; Attendance: 2,739

Game reference

Yaniv Perets
Goalies
Emil Zetterquist
Referees:
Cameron Lynch
Chris Pitoscia
Linesmen:
Stephen Drain
Patrick Dapuzzo

(Cipollone) Griffin Mendel (3) – 04:36	1–0
(Burgart) Ty Smilanic (13) – GW – 25:29	2–0
(Metsa, Lee) Michael Lombardi (12) – 39:29	3–0
	3–1	50:07 – Jordan Steinmetz (4) (Makowski, Moran)
(Brind'Amour) Griffin Mendel (4) – EN – 57:16	4–1

4 min
Penalties
4 min
27
Shots
21

March 12, 2022; 7:00 PM	Quinnipiac	4 – 3 (2OT) (0–1, 1–0, 2–2, 0–0, 1–0)	St. Lawrence	People's United Center; Attendance: 2,401

Game reference

Yaniv Perets
Goalies
Emil Zetterquist
Referees:
CJ Hanafin
Tom Steinel
Linesmen:
Ryan Knapp
Patrick Dapuzzo

	0–1	14:09 – Aleksi Peltonen (4) (Salem, Jankowski)
(Brind'Amour) Griffin Mendel (5) – 34:37	1–1
	1–2	41:42 – Jordan Steinmetz (5) (Pappas, Chapleau)
	1–3	43:32 – Josh Boyer (3) (Chapleau, Makowski)
(Mendel, Lombardi) Brendan Less (13) – PP – 47:41	2–3
(Lee, Rasanen) Skyler Brind'Amour (3) – 51:20	3–3
(Mendel, Metsa) Desi Burgart (7) – GW – 89:09	4–3

6 min
Penalties
10 min
44
Shots
34

Quinnipiac Won Series 2–0

==== (2) Clarkson vs. (7) Union ====
March 11, 2022; 7:00 PM	Clarkson	3 – 2 (OT) (1–0, 1–2, 0–0, 1–0)	Union	Cheel Arena; Attendance: 1,847

Game reference

Ethan Haider
Goalies
Connor Murphy
Referees:
Joe Carusone
Jason Williams
Linesmen:
Jason Shattie
Rick Lembo

(Martino, Tsekos) Noah Beck (5) – 14:25	1–0
	1–1	24:07 – PP – Josh Kosack (8) (Ferguson, Smedsrud)
(Campbell) Mathieu Gosselin (11) – 34:03	2–1
	2–2	36:16 – Dylan Anhorn (6) (Seger, Ferguson)
(Tsekos, Jacome) Ayrton Martino (7) – GW – 61:35	3–2

15 min
Penalties
2 min
40
Shots
27

March 12, 2022; 7:00 PM	Clarkson	4 – 3 (OT) (2–1, 1–1, 0–1, 1–0)	Union	Cheel Arena; Attendance: 2,077

Game reference

Jacob Mucitelli
Goalies
Connor Murphy
Referees:
Joe Carusone
Jason Williams
Linesmen:
Jason Shattie
Rick Lembo

(Tsekos, Callin) Lukas Kälble (6) – PP – 02:39	1–0
(Callin, Richardson) Michael Underwood (2) – 12:09	2–0
	2–1	17:04 – Andrew Seaman (3) (Farris, Petruolo)
	2–2	24:53 – Dylan Anhorn (7) (Graf, Seger)
(Beck, Mobley) Tommy Pasanen (3) – 37:35	3–2
	3–3	50:16 – Tyler Watkins (6) (unassisted)
(Taylor) Lukas Kälble (7) – GW – 63:14	4–3

6 min
Penalties
6 min
35
Shots
28

Clarkson Won Series 2–0

==== (3) Harvard vs. (6) Rensselaer ====
March 11, 2022; 7:00 PM	Harvard	4 – 3 (OT) (0–1, 0–1, 3–1, 1–0)	Rensselaer	Bright-Landry Hockey Center; Attendance: 778

Game reference

Mitchell Gibson
Goalies
Jack Watson
Referees:
Tom Steinel
Chip McDonald
Linesmen:
John Rey
Adam Wood

	0–1	12:42 – PP – Ture Linden (19) (Leppänen, Walsh)
	0–2	25:29 – Ture Linden (20) (Leppänen, Baxter)
	0–3	42:07 – Rory Herrman (3) (Walsh, Brackett)
(Laferriere, Farinacci) Marshall Rifai (6) – EA – 56:18	1–3
(Laferriere, Farinacci) Ryan Siedem (2) – EA – 58:02	2–3
(Abruzzese, Thrun) Matthew Coronato (14) – EA – 59:45	3–3
(Thrun, Dornbach) Jack Donato (8) – GW – 62:00	4–3

2 min
Penalties
4 min
46
Shots
24

March 12, 2022; 7:00 PM	Harvard	3 – 4 (2OT) (2–1, 0–0, 1–2, 0–0, 0–1)	Rensselaer	Bright-Landry Hockey Center; Attendance: 765

Game reference

Mitchell Gibson
Goalies
Jack Watson
Referees:
Tom Dellafranco
Chip McDonald
Linesmen:
John Rey
Adam Wood

(Gaffney, Siedem) John Farinacci (9) – 04:30	1–0
(Dornbach, Donato) Henry Thrun (7) – 09:41	2–0
	2–1	12:59 – Justin Addamo (14) (Sellar, Beaton)
	2–2	47:44 – Jakub Lacka (8) (Leppänen, Linden)
	2–3	51:18 – Zach Dubinsky (10) (Walsh, Mahshie)
(Coronato, Farrell) Nick Abruzzese (7) – 57:46	3–3
	3–4	81:21 – GW – John Beaton (4) (Addamo)

9 min
Penalties
4 min
50
Shots
38

March 13, 2022; 4:00 PM	Harvard	3 – 1 (1–0, 1–0, 1–1)	Rensselaer	Bright-Landry Hockey Center; Attendance: 477

Game reference

Mitchell Gibson
Goalies
Jack Watson
Referees:
Cameron Lynch
Jason Williams
Linesmen:
Stephen Drain
Jason Shattie

(Siedem, Rifai) John Farinacci (10) – 14:13	1–0
(Thrun, Coronato) Casey Dornbach (7) – GW – 21:05	2–0
	2–1	56:29 – PP – Ottoville Leppänen (9) (Lacka, Linden)
(Farrell, Abruzzese) Matthew Coronato (15) – EN – 59:28	3–1

6 min
Penalties
6 min
33
Shots
29

Harvard Won Series 2–1

==== (4) Cornell vs. (5) Colgate ====
March 11, 2022; 7:00 PM	Cornell	3 – 1 (0–0, 0–1, 3–0)	Colgate	Lynah Rink; Attendance: 3,550

Game reference

Ian Shane
Goalies
Mitch Benson
Referees:
Kevin Graber
C.J. Hanafin
Linesmen:
Ryan Knapp
Jordan Patarino

	0–1	23:43 – PP – Matt Verboon (8) (Anderson, A. Young)
(Andreev, Psenicka) Ben Berard (12) – 44:13	1–1
(Haiskanen, Berard) Matt Stienburg (12) – GW – 58:32	2–1
(Malone, Mitchell) Kyle Penney (8) – EN – 59:10	3–1

4 min
Penalties
23 min
43
Shots
17

March 12, 2022; 7:00 PM	Cornell	2 – 4 (0–1, 1–3, 1–0)	Colgate	Lynah Rink; Attendance: 4,034

Game reference

Ian Shane (out 28:25)
Joe Howe (in 28:25)
Goalies
Mitch Benson
Referees:
Cam Lynch
Chris Pitoscia
Linesmen:
Stephen Drain
Brian Oliver

	0–1	07:21 – PP – Alex Young (8) (Anderson, C. Young)
	0–2	24:39 – Ross Mitton (4) (Raymond)
(Malinski, Stienburg) Ben Berard (13) – 27:02	1–2
	1–3	28:25 – GW – Jeff Stewart (5) (Manderville, Bergsland)
	1–4	32:13 – PP – Matt Verboon (9) (A. Young, Anderson)
(Malone, Psenicka) Matt Stienburg (13) – EA – 58:16	2–4

42 min
Penalties
14 min
27
Shots
25

March 13, 2022; 4:00 PM	Cornell	1 – 2 (0–0, 0–1, 1–1)	Colgate	Lynah Rink; Attendance: 2,735

Game reference

Ian Shane
Goalies
Mitch Benson
Referees:
Joe Carusone
C.J. Hanafin
Linesmen:
Brian Oliver
Adam Wood

	0–1	31:05 – Matt Verboon (10) (McKechney)
	0–2	51:48 – GW – Ross Mitton (5) (unassisted)
(Psenicka, Malone) Ben Berard (14) – 59:52	1–2

2 min
Penalties
4 min
37
Shots
14

Colgate Won Series 2–1

=== Semifinal ===
==== (1) Quinnipiac vs. (5) Colgate ====
March 18, 2022; 4:00 PM	Quinnipiac	3 – 1 (2–0, 0–1, 1–0)	Colgate	Herb Brooks Arena; Attendance: 4,256

Game reference

Yaniv Perets
Goalies
Mitch Benson
Referees:
Joe Carusone
Chris Pitoscia
Linesmen:
Stephen Drain
Adam Wood

(Chau, Lombardi) Joey Cipollone (10) – PP – 09:23	1–0
(Friedmann, Less) Michael Lombardi (13) – GW – 16:43	2–0
	2–1	24:13 – Griffin Lunn (12) (Raymond)
(de Jong, Mendel) Wyatt Bongiovanni (15) – 49:40	3–1

2 min
Penalties
2 min
33
Shots
26

==== (2) Clarkson vs. (3) Harvard ====
March 18, 2022; 7:30 PM	Clarkson	3 – 5 (1–1, 2–1, 0–3)	Harvard	Herb Brooks Arena; Attendance: 4,256

Game reference

Ethan Haider
Goalies
Mitchell Gibson
Referees:
CJ Hanafin
Cameron Lynch
Linesmen:
Patrick Dapuzzo
Ryan Knapp

	0–1	08:20 – Sean Farrell (9) (Abruzzese, Coronato)
(Jacome, Beck) Alex Campbell (15) – PP – 14:47	1–1
	1–2	30:59 – Nick Abruzzese (8) (Moore, Coronato)
(Jacome, Beck) Alex Campbell (16) – PP – 33:11	2–2
(Martino) Zach Tsekos (15) – 36:52	3–2
	3–3	44:23 – Nick Abruzzese (9) (Farrell, Siedem)
	3–4	55:06 – GW – Matthew Coronato (16) (Abruzzese, Farrell)
	3–5	59:49 – EN – Matthew Coronato (6) (Thrun)

6 min
Penalties
10 min
27
Shots
34

=== Championship ===
==== (1) Quinnipiac vs. (3) Harvard ====
March 19, 2022; 7:30 PM	Quinnipiac	2 – 3 (OT) (1–1, 0-1, 1-0, 0-1)	Harvard	Herb Brooks Arena; Attendance: 4,478

Game reference

Yaniv Perets
Goalies
Mitchell Gibson
Referees:
Joe Carusone
CJ Hanafin
Linesmen:
Ryan Knapp
Brian Oliver

	0–1	01:07 – Ryan Siedem (3) (Rifai)
(Cipollone, Rasanen) T. J. Friedmann (9) – 05:24	1–1
	1–2	29:11 – PP – Ian Moore (2) (Coronato, Farrell)
(Bongiovanni) Jayden Lee (4) – PP EA – 53:44	2–2
	2–3	69:18 – GW – Matthew Coronato (18) (Moore, Farrell)

4 min
Penalties
10 min
49
Shots
17

== Tournament awards ==
=== Most Outstanding Player(s) ===
- Matthew Coronato
