= Brendan Whittet =

American ice hockey coach (born 1971)

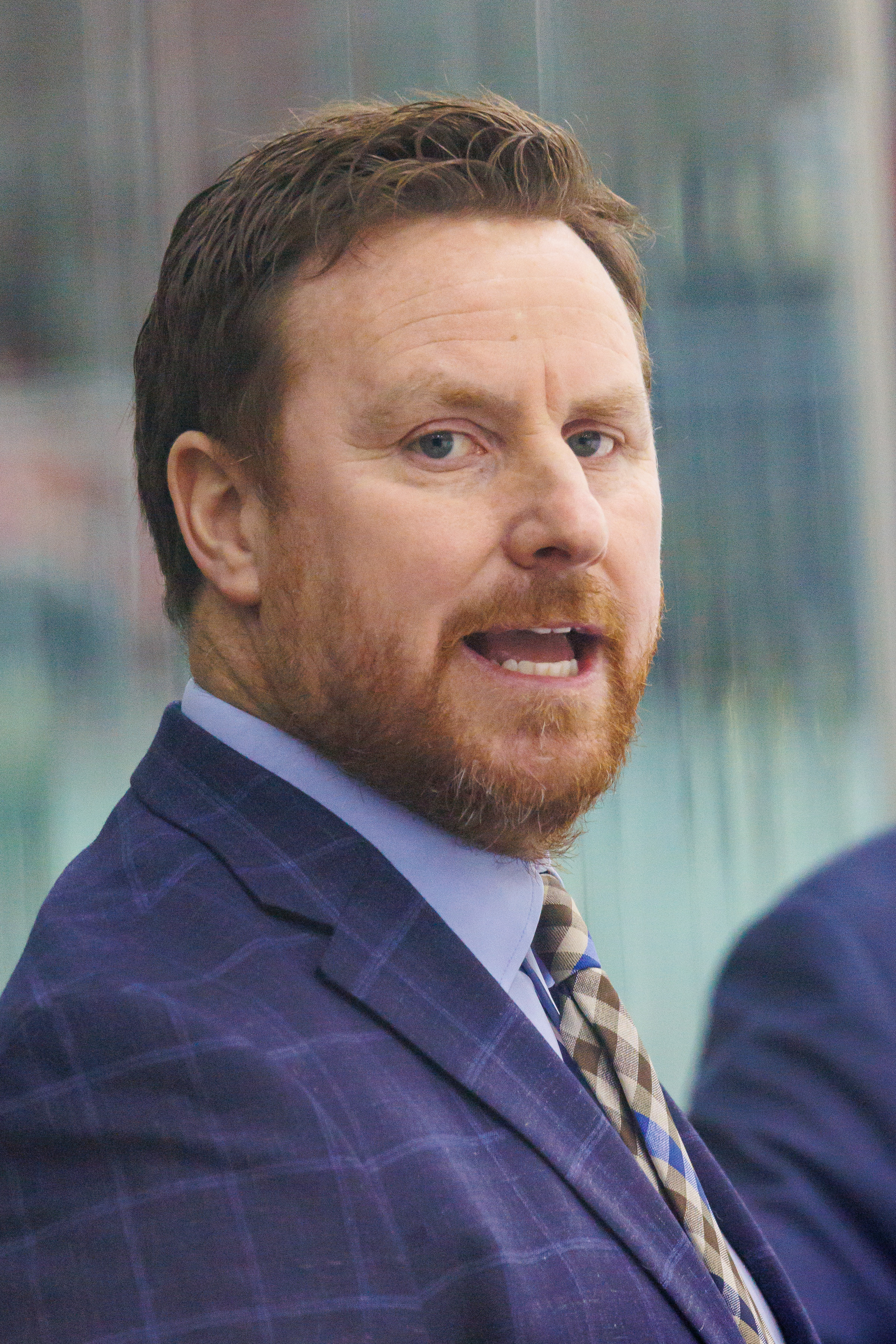
- Whittet in 2023

Biographical details
- Born: March 22, 1971 (age 55); East Providence, Rhode Island, U.S.
- Education: Brown University

Playing career
- 1990–1994: Brown
- Position: Defenseman

Coaching career (HC unless noted)
- 1994–1996: Brown (volunteer assistant)
- 1996–1997: Colby (assistant)
- 1997–1998: Brown (assistant)
- 1998–2009: Dartmouth (assistant)
- 2009–2026: Brown

Head coaching record
- Overall: 150–295–61 (.357)

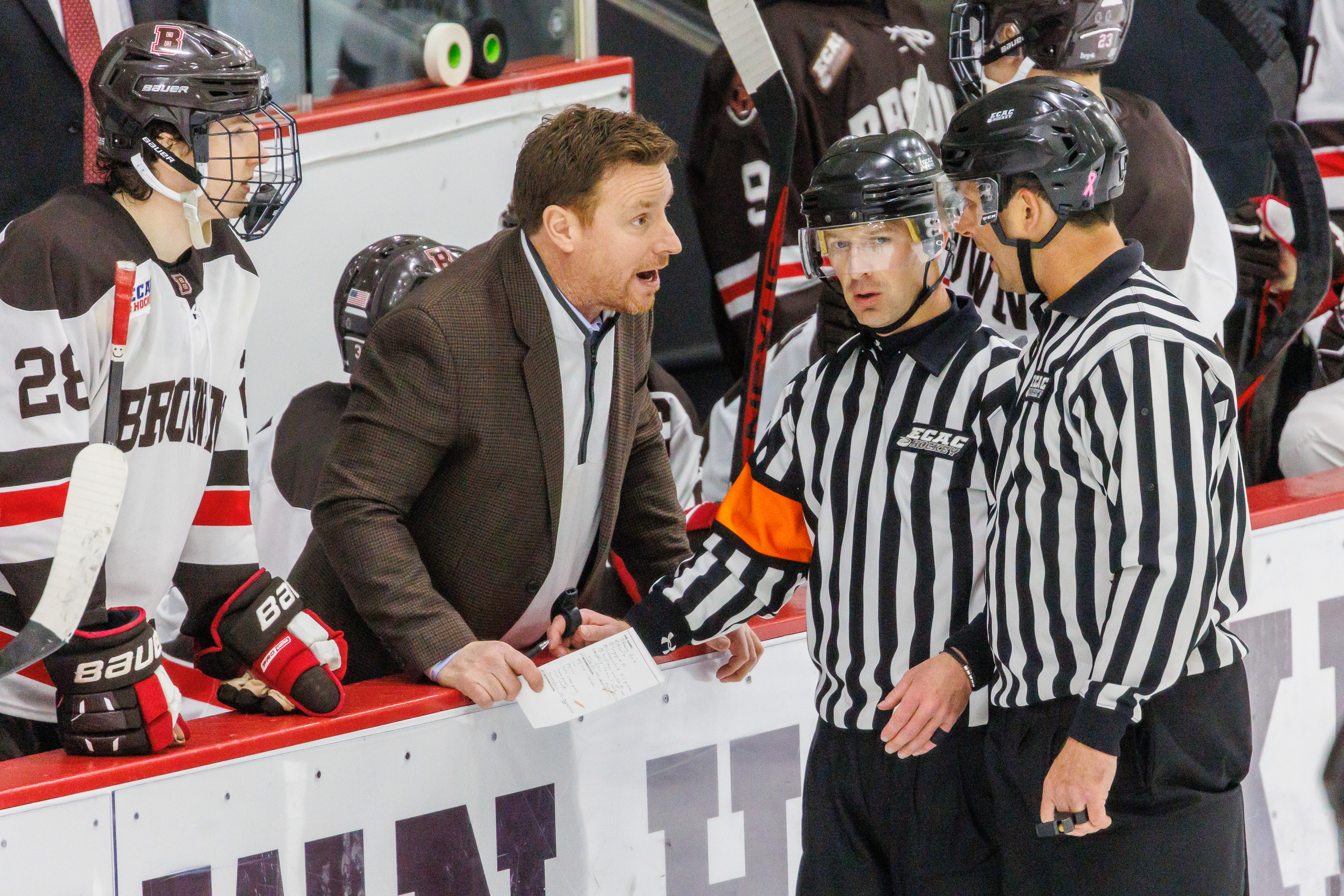
Whittet having a chat with referees

Brendan Whittet (born March 22, 1971) is an American former ice hockey coach who was the head coach at Brown from 2009 to 2026. Whittet graduated from Brown in 1994 before embarking on a coaching career at several colleges in New England. After 14 years as an assistant Whittet returned to his alma mater to assume the reins in 2009–10. He lives in Barrington, Rhode Island with his family.

Whittet stepped down from the coach position in February 2026, citing family medical leave.

== Career statistics ==
			Regular season					Playoffs
Season	Team	League	GP	G	A	Pts	PIM	GP	G	A	Pts	PIM
1990–91	Brown	ECAC Hockey	15	0	0	0	41	—	—	—	—	—
1991–92	Brown	ECAC Hockey	7	0	3	3	8	—	—	—	—	—
1992–93	Brown	ECAC Hockey	26	0	2	2	42	—	—	—	—	—
1993–94	Brown	ECAC Hockey	25	2	4	6	16	—	—	—	—	—
NCAA totals			73	2	9	11	107	—	—	—	—	—

== Head coaching record ==
Record table
Season	Team	Overall	Conference	Standing	Postseason
Brown Bears (ECAC Hockey) (2009–2026)
2009–10	Brown	13–20–4	6–12–4	11th	ECAC Third Place Game (win)
2010–11	Brown	10–16–5	8–12–2	9th	ECAC First Round
2011–12	Brown	9–18–5	5–13–4	12th	ECAC First Round
2012–13	Brown	16–14–6	7–9–6	t-7th	ECAC Runner-Up
2013–14	Brown	11–17–3	8–13–1	9th	ECAC First Round
2014–15	Brown	8–20–3	5–14–3	11th	ECAC First Round
2015–16	Brown	5–19–7	3–13–6	11th	ECAC First Round
2016–17	Brown	4–25–2	3–18–1	12th	ECAC First Round
2017–18	Brown	8–19–4	7–14–1	10th	ECAC First Round
2018–19	Brown	15–14–5	8–9–5	8th	ECAC Semifinals
2019–20	Brown	8–21–2	8–12–2	9th	ECAC First Round
2021–22	Brown	7–20–4	6–12–4	9th	ECAC First Round
2022–23	Brown	9–18–3	5–14–3	11th	ECAC First Round
2023–24	Brown	8–19–3	6–14–2	11th	ECAC First Round
2024–25	Brown	14–15–3	9–11–2	8th	ECAC Quarterfinals
2025–26	Brown	5–20–2 ^{†}	4–12–2 ^{†}	–	N/A
Brown:		150–295–61 (.357)	98–202–48 (.351)		
Total:		150–295–61 (.357)			
National champion Postseason invitational champion Conference regular season champion Conference regular season and conference tournament champion Division regular season champion Division regular season and conference tournament champion Conference tournament champion

† Whittet stepped down mid-season.
