= Lukas Kälble =

German ice hockey player (born 1997)

- Born: 13 October 1997 (age 28) Mannheim, Germany
- Height: 185 cm (6 ft 1 in)
- Weight: 93 kg (205 lb; 14 st 9 lb)
- Position: Defence
- Shoots: Left
- DEL team Former teams: Adler Mannheim; Florida Everblades; Fischtown Pinguins
- National team: Germany
- NHL draft: Undrafted
- Playing career: 2022–present

Lukas Kälble (born 13 October 1997, Mannheim, Germany) is a German professional ice hockey player who is a defenceman for Adler Mannheim of the Deutsche Eishockey Liga (DEL).

== Playing career ==
Kälble played college hockey for the Lake Superior State Lakers from 2017 to 2021 and for the Clarkson Golden Knights from 2021 to 2022.

On 22 July 2022, Kälble signed with the Charlotte Checkers of the American Hockey League (AHL).

== International play ==
Kälble represented the Germany national team at the 2026 Winter Olympics, and the 2024 and 2025 IIHF World Championship.

== Career statistics ==
=== Regular season and playoffs ===
			Regular season					Playoffs
Season	Team	League	GP	G	A	Pts	PIM	GP	G	A	Pts	PIM
2016–17	Fargo Force	USHL	38	4	13	17	6	3	0	0	0	0
2017–18	Lake Superior State University	NCAA	26	1	6	7	12	—	—	—	—	—
2018–19	Lake Superior State University	NCAA	37	2	21	23	8	—	—	—	—	—
2019–20	Lake Superior State University	NCAA	41	2	10	12	24	—	—	—	—	—
2020–21	Lake Superior State University	NCAA	27	2	13	15	16	—	—	—	—	—
2021–22	Clarkson University	NCAA	32	7	15	22	16	—	—	—	—	—
2021–22	Florida Everblades	ECHL	9	1	5	6	4	20	1	5	6	8
2022–23	Florida Everblades	ECHL	63	4	26	30	28	22	0	4	4	26
2023–24	Fischtown Pinguins	DEL	46	3	15	18	20	14	1	6	7	6
2024–25	Adler Mannheim	DEL	46	2	10	12	10	10	0	1	1	2
2025–26	Adler Mannheim	DEL	49	3	16	19	22	15	0	6	6	8
ECHL totals			72	5	31	36	32	42	1	9	10	34
DEL totals			141	8	41	49	52	39	1	13	14	16

=== International ===
Year	Team	Event	GP	G	A	Pts	PIM
2014	Germany U17	WHC-17	5	0	0	0	6
2015	Germany U18	WJC-18	6	2	1	3	10
2017	Germany U20	WJC-20 (D1)	5	1	1	2	0
2024	Germany	WC	8	3	1	4	2
2025	Germany	WC	6	2	2	4	0
2026	Germany	OG	5	1	1	2	2
Junior totals			16	3	2	5	16
Senior totals			19	6	4	10	4
