= 2021–22 Colgate Raiders men's ice hockey season =

- Conference: 5th ECAC Hockey
- Home ice: Class of 1965 Arena

Rankings
- USCHO: NR
- USA Today: NR

Record
- Overall: 18–18–4
- Conference: 9–9–4
- Home: 10–8–1
- Road: 8–9–3
- Neutral: 0–1–0

Coaches and captains
- Head coach: Don Vaughan
- Assistant coaches: Dana Borges; Andy Boschetto; Chris Azzano
- Captain: Paul McAvoy
- Alternate captain: Josh McKechney

The 2021–22 Colgate Raiders Men's ice hockey season was the 92nd season of play for the program and the 61st season in the ECAC Hockey conference. The Raiders represented the Colgate University and played their home games at Class of 1965 Arena, and were coached by Don Vaughan, in his 29th season as their head coach.

== Season ==
Colgate got off to a hot start, winning its first four games and nearly entering the top-20. The Raiders played a pivotal game against Western Michigan at the end of October and looked to be heading for a surprise win when the jumped out to a 5–0 lead. In the second half of the game, however, the Broncos completely took over the game and scored six unanswered goals to take the match. That loss kicked off a downward stretch for the team that saw them go 3–12–2 over a three month period. Other than a pair of shutouts in November, there was very little that went right for the Raiders. The team's offense was inconsistent, their goaltending was suspect and they sank towards the bottom of the conference standings.

After Carter Gylander lost his starting role in early January, both backups received time in goal but nothing seemed to work. Finally, at the end of the month, Mitch Benson put together a string of good games and allowed the team to get back on its feet. Over the final month of the season, Colgate started winning again and charged up the standings. The Raiders propelled themselves into a mediocre record, good enough for 5th in the ECAC. While they still had to play in the First Round of the conference tournament, they did so against the weakest opponent.

Colgate got a small scare in the first game when Yale tied the match in the last minute of regulation to force overtime. After escaping with a win, the Raiders were much better in the second game and swept the series. In the quarterfinals, Benson was assailed by the Cornell offense, facing 43 shots in the first match. After the loss, the team had no room for error and responded with a strong performance in game 2, tying the series with an offensive outburst. The final meeting looked more like the first, with the Big Red firing shot after shot on goal but Benson was equal to the task. He held Cornell scoreless for over 59 minutes, allowing the Riders to build a 2–0 lead, but lost his shutout bid with just 8 seconds to play. The result was what Colgate needed however, and the team advanced to the semifinals.

Because of the poor middle to their season, Colgate had no chance to make the NCAA tournament without winning the conference championship. To do that they would first have to get past Quinnipiac, who had been ranked #1 earlier in the season. The top seed didn't take pity on the Raiders and got out to a 2 goal lead in the first period. Colgate upped their game in the second, cutting the Bobcats' advantage in half, but the Raider offense couldn't net a tying goal. A third goal midway through the third put Quinnipiac back up by 2 Colgate's tournament hopes were dashed shortly afterwards.

== Departures ==
| Player | Position | Nationality | Cause |
|---|---|---|---|
| Nick Austin | Defenseman | United States | Graduate transfer to Massachusetts Lowell |
| Trevor Cosgrove | Defenseman | United States | Graduate transfer to Northern Michigan |
| Tyler Jeanson | Forward | Canada | Graduation (signed with Wichita Thunder) |
| Henry Marshall | Forward | United States | Graduation (retired) |
| Evan Tschumi | Defenseman | Canada | Graduation (signed with HC Lugano) |

== Recruiting ==
| Player | Position | Nationality | Age | Notes |
|---|---|---|---|---|
| Nic Belpedio | Defenseman | United States | 19 | Skokie, IL |
| Tommy Bergsland | Defenseman | United States | 20 | Plymouth, MN |
| Alex DiPaolo | Forward | Canada | 21 | Oakville, ON |
| Cole Hanson | Forward | United States | 21 | Grand Forks, ND |
| Ryan McGuire | Forward | Canada | 19 | Sainte-Agathe-des-Monts, QC |
| Daniel Panetta | Forward | Canada | 20 | Belleville, ON |
| Ben Raymond | Forward | Canada | 20 | Newton, MA |

== Roster ==
As of August 19, 2021.

| No. | Nat. | Player | Class | Pos | Height | Weight | DoB | Hometown | Previous team | NHL rights |
|---|---|---|---|---|---|---|---|---|---|---|
| 1 | (Canada) | Mitch Benson | Senior | G | 6' 1" (1.85 m) | 185 lb (84 kg) | 1997-11-18 | Windsor, Ontario | Brooks Bandits (AJHL) | — |
| 2 | (United States) | Pierson Brandon | Sophomore | D | 6' 0" (1.83 m) | 180 lb (82 kg) | 2000-06-26 | Irvington, New York | Aberdeen Wings (NAHL) | — |
| 3 | (United States) | Anthony Stark | Junior | D | 5' 9" (1.75 m) | 170 lb (77 kg) | 1999-04-09 | New York, New York | Madison Capitols (USHL) | — |
| 4 | (Canada) | Elliott McDermott | Sophomore | D | 5' 11" (1.8 m) | 193 lb (88 kg) | 1999-02-03 | Kingston, Ontario | Carleton Place Canadians (CCHL) | — |
| 5 | (United States) | Paul McAvoy (C) | Graduate | F | 6' 2" (1.88 m) | 195 lb (88 kg) | 1996-09-17 | Richmond, Kentucky | Surrey Eagles (BCHL) | — |
| 7 | (Canada) | Josh McKechney (A) | Graduate | F | 6' 2" (1.88 m) | 200 lb (91 kg) | 1997-05-29 | Calgary, Alberta | Brooks Bandits (AJHL) | — |
| 8 | (United States) | P. J. Garrett | Sophomore | D | 6' 4" (1.93 m) | 210 lb (95 kg) | 2000-01-17 | Duxbury, Massachusetts | Powell River Kings (BCHL) | — |
| 9 | (United States) | Nic Belpedio | Freshman | D | 5' 10" (1.78 m) | 194 lb (88 kg) | 2001-10-09 | Skokie, Illinois | Waterloo Black Hawks (USHL) | — |
| 10 | (Canada) | Arnaud Vachon | Junior | F | 6' 2" (1.88 m) | 210 lb (95 kg) | 1998-05-13 | Ajax, Ontario | Brooks Bandits (AJHL) | — |
| 12 | (Canada) | Colton Young | Junior | F | 6' 0" (1.83 m) | 175 lb (79 kg) | 1998-08-23 | Calgary, Alberta | Canmore Eagles (AJHL) | — |
| 13 | (Switzerland) | Matt Verboon | Junior | F | 6' 1" (1.85 m) | 195 lb (88 kg) | 2000-02-23 | Geneva, Switzerland | Salmon Arm Silverbacks (BCHL) | — |
| 14 | (Canada) | Ethan Manderville | Junior | F | 6' 4" (1.93 m) | 215 lb (98 kg) | 2000-07-01 | Ottawa, Ontario | Ottawa Jr. Senators (CCHL) | — |
| 15 | (United States) | Jack Hoey | Junior | F | 6' 1" (1.85 m) | 200 lb (91 kg) | 1998-11-03 | Fairfield, Connecticut | Choate Rosemary Hall (USHS–CT) | — |
| 16 | (United States) | Griffin Lunn | Senior | F | 5' 10" (1.78 m) | 190 lb (86 kg) | 1997-11-15 | Lockport, New York | Sioux Falls Stampede (USHL) | — |
| 17 | (United States) | Ross Mitton | Sophomore | F | 5' 10" (1.78 m) | 185 lb (84 kg) | 2000-07-05 | Copiague Harbor, New York | Omaha Lancers (USHL) | — |
| 18 | (United States) | Ben Raymond | Freshman | F | 5' 11" (1.8 m) | 180 lb (82 kg) | 2001-08-22 | Newton, Massachusetts | Powell River Kings (BCHL) | — |
| 19 | (United States) | Ryan McGuire | Freshman | F | 6' 2" (1.88 m) | 183 lb (83 kg) | 2002-07-27 | New Canaan, Connecticut | Penticton Vees (BCHL) | — |
| 20 | (Canada) | Levi Glasman | Sophomore | F | 6' 2" (1.88 m) | 172 lb (78 kg) | 1999-07-31 | Lacombe, Alberta | Powell River Kings (BCHL) | — |
| 21 | (Canada) | Alex Young | Sophomore | F | 5' 11" (1.8 m) | 180 lb (82 kg) | 2001-03-22 | Calgary, Alberta | Canmore Eagles (AJHL) | SJS, 196th overall 2020 |
| 22 | (United States) | Cole Hanson | Freshman | F | 5' 11" (1.8 m) | 180 lb (82 kg) | 2000-09-19 | Grand Forks, North Dakota | New Mexico Ice Wolves (NAHL) | — |
| 23 | (Canada) | Jeff Stewart | Senior | F | 6' 3" (1.91 m) | 193 lb (88 kg) | 1998-02-23 | Surrey, British Columbia | Surrey Eagles (BCHL) | — |
| 25 | (United States) | Tommy Bergsland | Freshman | D | 6' 3" (1.91 m) | 185 lb (84 kg) | 2001-03-23 | Minnetrista, Minnesota | Bismarck Bobcats (NAHL) | — |
| 26 | (Canada) | Liam Watson-Brawn | Junior | D | 6' 0" (1.83 m) | 190 lb (86 kg) | 1999-04-06 | Vancouver, British Columbia | Prince George Spruce Kings (BCHL) | — |
| 27 | (United States) | Nick Anderson | Sophomore | D | 5' 10" (1.78 m) | 165 lb (75 kg) | 1999-01-04 | Independence, Minnesota | Sioux Falls Stampede (USHL) | — |
| 28 | (Canada) | Alex DiPaolo | Freshman | F | 6' 1" (1.85 m) | 188 lb (85 kg) | 2000-04-28 | Oakville, Ontario | Victoria Grizzlies (BCHL) | — |
| 31 | (Canada) | Andrew Farrier | Senior | G | 6' 2" (1.88 m) | 195 lb (88 kg) | 1997-10-01 | Montreal, Quebec | Kingston Voyageurs (OJHL) | — |
| 32 | (United States) | Will Friend | Senior | G | 6' 2" (1.88 m) | 175 lb (79 kg) | 1999-08-02 | South Hamilton, Massachusetts | The Governor's Academy (USHS–MA) | — |
| 37 | (Canada) | Carter Gylander | Sophomore | G | 6' 5" (1.96 m) | 185 lb (84 kg) | 2001-06-05 | Beaumont, Alberta | Sherwood Park Crusaders (AJHL) | DET, 191st overall 2019 |

== Standings ==
2021–22 ECAC Hockey Standings
| | Conference record | | | | | | | | | | Overall record | | | | | |
| | GP | W | L | T | OTW | OTL | 3/SW | PTS | GF | GA | GP | W | L | T | GF | GA |
|---|---|---|---|---|---|---|---|---|---|---|---|---|---|---|---|---|
| #8 Quinnipiac † | 22 | 17 | 4 | 1 | 0 | 1 | 1 | 54 | 71 | 14 | 42 | 32 | 7 | 3 | 139 | 53 |
| #17 Clarkson | 22 | 14 | 4 | 4 | 0 | 2 | 3 | 51 | 86 | 47 | 37 | 21 | 10 | 6 | 123 | 85 |
| #15 Harvard * | 22 | 14 | 6 | 2 | 0 | 0 | 2 | 46 | 69 | 46 | 35 | 21 | 11 | 3 | 116 | 82 |
| Cornell | 22 | 12 | 6 | 4 | 2 | 1 | 0 | 39 | 73 | 47 | 32 | 18 | 10 | 4 | 100 | 72 |
| Colgate | 22 | 9 | 9 | 4 | 1 | 0 | 3 | 33 | 55 | 57 | 40 | 18 | 18 | 4 | 111 | 112 |
| Rensselaer | 22 | 10 | 12 | 0 | 0 | 0 | 0 | 30 | 58 | 63 | 44 | 18 | 23 | 3 | 114 | 119 |
| Union | 22 | 9 | 11 | 2 | 3 | 1 | 0 | 27 | 52 | 66 | 37 | 14 | 19 | 4 | 89 | 110 |
| St. Lawrence | 22 | 7 | 10 | 5 | 2 | 0 | 2 | 26 | 44 | 60 | 37 | 11 | 19 | 7 | 72 | 110 |
| Brown | 22 | 6 | 12 | 4 | 0 | 1 | 2 | 25 | 36 | 61 | 31 | 7 | 20 | 4 | 50 | 100 |
| Princeton | 22 | 7 | 14 | 1 | 0 | 1 | 0 | 23 | 54 | 89 | 31 | 8 | 21 | 2 | 70 | 122 |
| Yale | 22 | 7 | 14 | 1 | 3 | 1 | 1 | 21 | 38 | 60 | 30 | 8 | 21 | 1 | 55 | 90 |
| Dartmouth | 22 | 5 | 15 | 2 | 0 | 3 | 1 | 21 | 45 | 71 | 32 | 7 | 22 | 3 | 69 | 110 |
Championship: March 19, 2022 † indicates conference regular season champion (Cleary Cup) * indicates conference tournament champion (Whitelaw Cup); Rankings: USCHO.com Top 20 Poll

== Schedule and results ==
| Date | Time | Opponent^{#} | Rank^{#} | Site | TV | Decision | Result | Attendance | Record |
Regular season
| October 2 | 7:05 PM | at RIT* | | Gene Polisseni Center • Henrietta, New York | | Gylander | W 5–2 | 3,176 | 1–0–0 |
| October 8 | 7:00 PM | at Vermont* | | Gutterson Fieldhouse • Burlington, Vermont | | Gylander | W 5–3 | 2,705 | 2–0–0 |
| October 9 | 7:00 PM | at Vermont* | | Gutterson Fieldhouse • Burlington, Vermont | | Farrier | W 2–1 | 2,728 | 3–0–0 |
| October 15 | 7:00 PM | Merrimack* | | Class of 1965 Arena • Hamilton, New York | | Gylander | W 2–1 ^{OT} | 917 | 4–0–0 |
| October 16 | 4:00 PM | Merrimack* | | Class of 1965 Arena • Hamilton, New York | | Farrier | L 3–5 | 614 | 4–1–0 |
| October 22 | 7:00 PM | Arizona State* | | Class of 1965 Arena • Hamilton, New York | | Gylander | W 8–3 | 1,081 | 5–1–0 |
| October 23 | 7:00 PM | Arizona State* | | Class of 1965 Arena • Hamilton, New York | | Gylander | L 3–4 | 1,394 | 5–2–0 |
| October 29 | 7:00 PM | #13 Western Michigan* | | Class of 1965 Arena • Hamilton, New York | | Gylander | L 5–6 | 1,022 | 5–3–0 |
| October 30 | 5:00 PM | #13 Western Michigan* | | Class of 1965 Arena • Hamilton, New York | | Benson | L 1–2 ^{OT} | 844 | 5–4–0 |
| November 5 | 7:00 PM | at Dartmouth | | Thompson Arena • Hanover, New Hampshire | | Gylander | L 2–3 | 990 | 5–5–0 (0–1–0) |
| November 6 | 7:00 PM | at #13 Harvard | | Bright-Landry Hockey Center • Boston, Massachusetts | | Farrier | L 1–5 | 1,587 | 5–6–0 (0–2–0) |
| November 12 | 7:00 PM | Rensselaer | | Class of 1965 Arena • Hamilton, New York | | Gylander | W 5–2 | 350 | 6–6–0 (1–2–0) |
| November 13 | 3:00 PM | Union | | Class of 1965 Arena • Hamilton, New York | | Gylander | L 0–2 | 528 | 6–7–0 (1–3–0) |
| November 19 | 7:30 PM | Yale | | Class of 1965 Arena • Hamilton, New York | | Gylander | W 3–0 | 628 | 7–7–0 (2–3–0) |
| November 20 | 7:30 PM | Brown | | Class of 1965 Arena • Hamilton, New York | | Gylander | W 6–0 | 523 | 8–7–0 (3–3–0) |
| November 27 | 7:00 PM | at Connecticut* | | XL Center • Hartford, Connecticut | | Benson | L 1–6 | 3,134 | 8–8–0 |
| December 3 | 7:00 PM | at #19 Clarkson | | Cheel Arena • Potsdam, New York | | Gylander | L 1–2 | 2,669 | 8–9–0 (3–4–0) |
| December 4 | 7:00 PM | at St. Lawrence | | Appleton Arena • Canton, New York | | Gylander | L 3–4 | 1,031 | 8–10–0 (3–5–0) |
| January 7 | 6:37 PM | at Northern Michigan* | | Berry Events Center • Marquette, Michigan | | Gylander | L 2–4 | 1,832 | 8–11–0 |
| January 8 | 6:37 PM | at Northern Michigan* | | Berry Events Center • Marquette, Michigan | | Gylander | L 3–6 | 2,227 | 8–12–0 |
| January 16 | 7:00 PM | at Yale | | Ingalls Rink • New Haven, Connecticut | | Benson | T 2–2 ^{SOL} | 0 | 8–12–1 (3–5–1) |
| January 21 | 7:00 PM | #1 Quinnipiac | | Class of 1965 Arena • Hamilton, New York | | Benson | L 1–5 | 607 | 8–13–1 (3–6–1) |
| January 22 | 7:00 PM | Princeton | | Class of 1965 Arena • Hamilton, New York | | Farrier | T 2–2 ^{SOW} | 0 | 8–13–2 (3–6–2) |
| January 28 | 7:00 PM | Harvard | | Class of 1965 Arena • Hamilton, New York | | Farrier | L 5–3 | 808 | 8–14–2 (3–7–2) |
| January 29 | 7:00 PM | Dartmouth | | Class of 1965 Arena • Hamilton, New York | | Benson | W 2–1 | 606 | 9–14–2 (4–7–2) |
| February 4 | 7:30 PM | #11 Cornell | | Meehan Auditorium • Providence, Rhode Island | | Benson | W 3–2 | 1,292 | 10–14–2 (5–7–2) |
| February 5 | 7:00 PM | at #11 Cornell | | Lynah Rink • Ithaca, New York | | Benson | T 2–2 ^{SOW} | 3,201 | 10–14–3 (5–7–3) |
| February 11 | 7:00 PM | at Union | | Achilles Rink • Schenectady, New York | | Benson | W 6–4 | 1,325 | 11–14–3 (6–7–3) |
| February 12 | 7:00 PM | at Rensselaer | | Houston Field House • Troy, New York | | Benson | W 3–2 | 430 | 12–14–3 (7–7–3) |
| February 14 | 7:00 PM | at Brown | | Meehan Auditorium • Providence, Rhode Island | | Benson | T 1–1 ^{SOW} | 207 | 12–14–4 (7–7–4) |
| February 18 | 7:00 PM | #15 Clarkson | | Class of 1965 Arena • Hamilton, New York | | Benson | L 1–4 | 996 | 12–15–4 (7–8–4) |
| February 19 | 7:00 PM | St. Lawrence | | Class of 1965 Arena • Hamilton, New York | | Benson | W 4–2 | 927 | 13–15–4 (8–8–4) |
| February 25 | 7:00 PM | at Princeton | | Hobey Baker Memorial Rink • Princeton, New Jersey | | Benson | W 4–3 | 1,151 | 14–15–4 (9–8–4) |
| February 26 | 7:00 PM | at #5 Quinnipiac | | People's United Center • Hamden, Connecticut | | Benson | L 0–4 | 3,061 | 14–16–4 (9–9–4) |
ECAC Hockey Tournament
| March 4 | 7:00 PM | Yale* | | Class of 1965 Arena • Hamilton, New York (First Round game 1) | | Benson | W 3–2 ^{OT} | 1,002 | 15–16–4 |
| March 5 | 7:00 PM | Yale* | | Class of 1965 Arena • Hamilton, New York (First Round game 2) | | Benson | W 5–1 | 848 | 16–16–4 |
Colgate Won Series 2–0
| March 11 | 7:00 PM | at #18 Cornell* | | Lynah Rink • Ithaca, New York (Quarterfinal game 1) | | Benson | L 1–3 | 3,550 | 16–17–4 |
| March 12 | 7:00 PM | at #18 Cornell* | | Lynah Rink • Ithaca, New York (Quarterfinal game 2) | | Benson | W 4–2 | 4,034 | 17–17–4 |
| March 13 | 4:00 PM | at #18 Cornell* | | Lynah Rink • Ithaca, New York (Quarterfinal game 3) | | Benson | W 2–1 | 2,735 | 18–17–4 |
Colgate Won Series 2–1
| March 18 | 4:00 PM | vs. #6 Quinnipiac* | | Herb Brooks Arena • Lake Placid, New York (Semifinal) | | Benson | L 1–3 | 4,256 | 18–18–4 |
*Non-conference game. ^{#}Rankings from USCHO.com Poll. All times are in Eastern Time. Source:

== Scoring statistics ==
| Name | Position | Games | Goals | Assists | Points | PIM |
|---|---|---|---|---|---|---|
| Colton Young | F | 38 | 15 | 17 | 32 | 24 |
| Alex Young | C | 39 | 10 | 21 | 31 | 51 |
| Matt Verboon | C/RW | 40 | 10 | 18 | 28 | 6 |
| Josh McKechney | F | 40 | 14 | 13 | 27 | 21 |
| Griffin Lunn | D | 32 | 12 | 7 | 19 | 14 |
| Nick Anderson | D | 35 | 1 | 18 | 19 | 23 |
| Ethan Manderville | C | 39 | 4 | 12 | 16 | 6 |
| Pierson Brandon | D | 37 | 6 | 9 | 15 | 18 |
| Arnaud Vachon | C | 40 | 6 | 8 | 14 | 55 |
| Alex DiPaolo | LW | 31 | 4 | 9 | 13 | 33 |
| Elliott McDermott | D | 40 | 2 | 11 | 13 | 22 |
| Ross Mitton | F | 35 | 5 | 7 | 12 | 0 |
| Jeffrey Stewart | LW | 40 | 5 | 7 | 12 | 41 |
| Tommy Bergsland | D | 40 | 4 | 7 | 11 | 33 |
| Nic Belpedio | D | 36 | 4 | 5 | 9 | 16 |
| Paul McAvoy | F | 29 | 2 | 6 | 8 | 12 |
| Ben Raymond | C/LW | 20 | 2 | 2 | 4 | 2 |
| Ryan McGuire | C | 37 | 1 | 3 | 4 | 29 |
| Levi Glasman | LW | 24 | 3 | 0 | 3 | 22 |
| Cole Hanson | F | 24 | 1 | 2 | 3 | 6 |
| Liam Watson-Brawn | D | 20 | 0 | 3 | 3 | 10 |
| Anthony Stark | D | 29 | 0 | 2 | 2 | 10 |
| P. J. Garrett | D | 13 | 0 | 1 | 1 | 12 |
| Carter Gylander | G | 16 | 0 | 1 | 1 | 0 |
| Jack Hoey | C | 1 | 0 | 0 | 0 | 0 |
| William Friend | G | 1 | 0 | 0 | 0 | 0 |
| Andrew Farrier | G | 5 | 0 | 0 | 0 | 0 |
| Mitch Benson | G | 20 | 0 | 0 | 0 | 0 |
| Bench | - | - | - | - | - | 0 |
| Total | | | 111 | 189 | 300 | 466 |

== Goaltending statistics ==
| Name | Games | Minutes | Wins | Losses | Ties | Goals against | Saves | Shut outs | SV % | GAA |
|---|---|---|---|---|---|---|---|---|---|---|
| Mitch Benson | 20 | 1203 | 10 | 7 | 3 | 48 | 571 | 0 | .922 | 2.39 |
| Carter Gylander | 16 | 911 | 7 | 8 | 0 | 42 | 414 | 2 | .908 | 2.76 |
| Andrew Farrier | 5 | 301 | 1 | 3 | 1 | 17 | 152 | 0 | .899 | 3.38 |
| Will Friend | 1 | 1:08 | 0 | 0 | 0 | 1 | 1 | 0 | .500 | 52.94 |
| Empty Net | - | 23 | - | - | - | 4 | - | - | - | - |
| Total | 40 | 2441 | 18 | 18 | 4 | 112 | 1138 | 2 | .910 | 2.75 |

== Rankings ==
| Poll | Week | | | | | | | | | | | | | | | | | | | | | | | | | |
| Poll | Pre | 1 | 2 | 3 | 4 | 5 | 6 | 7 | 8 | 9 | 10 | 11 | 12 | 13 | 14 | 15 | 16 | 17 | 18 | 19 | 20 | 21 | 22 | 23 | 24 | 25 (Final) |
|---|---|---|---|---|---|---|---|---|---|---|---|---|---|---|---|---|---|---|---|---|---|---|---|---|---|---|
| USCHO.com | NR | NR | NR | NR | NR | NR | NR | NR | NR | NR | NR | NR | NR | NR | NR | NR | NR | NR | NR | NR | NR | NR | NR | NR | - | NR |
| USA Today | NR | NR | NR | NR | NR | NR | NR | NR | NR | NR | NR | NR | NR | NR | NR | NR | NR | NR | NR | NR | NR | NR | NR | NR | NR | NR |

Note: USCHO did not release a poll in week 24.

== Players drafted into the NHL ==
=== 2022 NHL entry draft ===
| Round | Pick | Player | NHL team |
|---|---|---|---|
| 4 | 111 | Noah Laba^{†} | New York Rangers |
| 6 | 169 | Jared Wright^{†} | Los Angeles Kings |

† incoming freshman
