= 2021–22 RPI Engineers men's ice hockey season =

- Conference: 6th ECAC Hockey
- Home ice: Houston Field House

Rankings
- USCHO: NR
- USA Today: NR

Record
- Overall: 18–23–3
- Conference: 10–12–0
- Home: 9–10–1
- Road: 9–12–2
- Neutral: 0–1–0

Coaches and captains
- Head coach: Dave Smith
- Assistant coaches: Mathias Lange; Chuck Weber; Jake Marrello

The 2021–22 RPI Engineers Men's ice hockey season was the 102nd season of play for the program and the 60th season in the ECAC Hockey conference. The Engineers represented Rensselaer Polytechnic Institute and played their home games at Houston Field House, and were coached by Dave Smith, in his 4th season.

== Season ==
Rensselaer returned to the ice after losing all of last season to the COVID-19 pandemic. The team began the year with a decent start, albeit against fairly weak competition. But looked to be in good standing after taking down Clarkson in early November. However, the following week, the Engineers were embarrassed by Cornell 3–11, the program's worst loss in decades. Afterwards, the defense recovered but the team was soon beset by a lack of offense over a several week span. RPI ended their first half with a 2–6 run with the only saving grace being that five of those losses were to non-conference teams.

After returning from the winter break, Rensselaer was forced to postpone or cancel several games in early January due to an increase in positive COVID-19 tests. When they did began playing games, the team also found itself in need of a new starting goaltender as presumptive primary netminder, Linden Marshall, had not performed well enough to retain the job. Newcomer Jack Watson was a bit inconsistent in his early appearances, but he possessed a higher ceiling than Marshall and Dave Smith eventually settled on the freshman as the starter. The offense also saw a steady improvement after returning to action but remained hot and cold for the remainder of the regular season. RPI would regularly follow stunning victories with confounding losses and ended the year just under .500. However, with a 6th-place finish, they did at least receive a home site for the first round of the conference tournament.

Despite having Marshall in net for the regular season finale, Watson led the Engineers into the postseason. Despite vastly outshooting Dartmouth in the opening match, RPI fell 2–3. The offense continued to pressure the Big Green net in the next two games and took advantage of several power play opportunities, riding their special team to consecutive wins and advancing to the quarterfinals. Rensselaer took control of the first game when they gained a 3–0 lead early in the third period. Watson kept Harvard off of the scoresheet despite a barrage of shots but, after the Crimson pulled their goaltender, the tide began to turn. RPI was swarmed over by Harvard and surrendered 3 goals in the final 4 minutes, all with the aide of an extra attacker. The momentum remained with their opponents and the Engineers allowed the winning goal just 2 minutes into overtime.

The second game did not have quite as much drama but it still saw Harvard tying the game late and force overtime once more. Watson was again called upon to stop a multitude of Crimson shots but this time he held his ground in the extra frame and sent the match into a second overtime. John Beaton saved the Engineer's season with the winner and set up a deciding third game. Watson was up to the task, holding Harvard to 2 goals, but the offense was not. RPI was stymied by the Crimson defense and the team fell 1–3.

== Departures ==
Player	Position	Nationality	Cause
Cory Babichuk	Defenseman	Canada	Transferred to Vermont
Alec Calvaruso	Goaltender	United States	Graduate transfer to American International
Danny DiGrande	Forward	United States	Transferred to Canisius
Brady Ferner	Defenseman	United States	Transferred to North Dakota
Billy Jerry	Forward	United States	Graduate transfer to Long Island
Tommy Lee	Forward	Canada	Signed professional contract (Åmåls SK)

== Recruiting ==
Player	Position	Nationality	Age	Notes
Justin Addamo	Forward	France	23	Clermont-Ferrand, FRA; transfer from Robert Morris
Jack Agnew	Defenseman	Canada	19	Oakville, ON; transfer from Boston College
Anthony Baxter	Defenseman	Canada	23	Oakville, ON; graduate transfer from Massachusetts Lowell
Jakob Lee	Forward	Canada	22	Owen Sound, ON; transfer from Merrimack
Reid Leibold	Forward	United States	19	Ashburn, VA
T. J. Walsh	Forward	United States	21	Shrewsbury, MA; transfer from Northeastern
Jack Watson	Goaltender	Canada	21	Toronto, ON

== Roster ==
As of August 19, 2021.

No.	Nat.	Player	Class	Pos	Height	Weight	DoB	Hometown	Previous team	NHL rights
1	(Canada)	Linden Marshall	Graduate	G	6' 3" (1.91 m)	195 lb (88 kg)	1998-07-21	Victoria, British Columbia	Trail Smoke Eaters (BCHL)	—
2	(United States)	Simon Kjellberg	Junior	D	6' 3" (1.91 m)	190 lb (86 kg)	2000-02-17	Nashville, Tennessee	Dubuque Fighting Saints (USHL)	NYR, 163rd overall 2018
3	(Finland)	Lauri Sertti	Sophomore	D	6' 1" (1.85 m)	190 lb (86 kg)	1999-07-11	Espoo, Finland	Amarillo Bulls (NAHL)	—
4	(United States)	Mason Klee	Junior	D	6' 2" (1.88 m)	195 lb (88 kg)	1999-10-04	Morrison, Colorado	Sioux Falls Stampede (USHL)	—
5	(Canada)	Anthony Baxter	Graduate	D	6' 0" (1.83 m)	185 lb (84 kg)	1997-11-26	Oakville, Ontario	Massachusetts Lowell (HEA)	—
6	(Canada)	Jack Agnew	Sophomore	D	5' 11" (1.8 m)	195 lb (88 kg)	2001-10-22	Oakville, Ontario	Boston College (HEA)	—
7	(United States)	Nick Bowman	Senior	F	6' 0" (1.83 m)	200 lb (91 kg)	1997-12-19	Shelby, Michigan	Coulee Region Chill (NAHL)	—
8	(Canada)	James McIsaac	Sophomore	F	5' 10" (1.78 m)	175 lb (79 kg)	1999-04-29	Winnipeg, Manitoba	Brooks Bandits (AJHL)	—
9	(United States)	Reid Leibold	Freshman	F	5' 10" (1.78 m)	175 lb (79 kg)	2001-10-23	Ashburn, Virginia	Maryland Black Bears (NAHL)	—
10	(United States)	Dylan Davies	Sophomore	D	6' 3" (1.91 m)	195 lb (88 kg)	2001-02-09	Traverse City, Michigan	Sioux Falls Stampede (USHL)	—
11	(Finland)	Ottoville Leppänen	Senior	F	5' 10" (1.78 m)	185 lb (84 kg)	1998-06-18	Espoo, Finland	Espoo Blues U20 (Nuorten SM-liiga)	—
13	(United States)	T. J. Walsh	Junior	F	5' 9" (1.75 m)	165 lb (75 kg)	2000-04-29	Shrewsbury, Massachusetts	Northeastern (HEA)	—
14	(United States)	Zach Dubinsky	Junior	F	5' 8" (1.73 m)	175 lb (79 kg)	2000-03-14	Highland Park, Illinois	Omaha Lancers (USHL)	—
15	(Finland)	Altti Nykänen	Sophomore	F	6' 3" (1.91 m)	185 lb (84 kg)	2001-09-26	Vihti, Finland	Bishop's College School (CISAA)	—
16	(United States)	Rory Herrman	Junior	F	6' 0" (1.83 m)	200 lb (91 kg)	1999-03-16	Poway, California	Fargo Force (USHL)	—
17	(Canada)	John Beaton	Sophomore	F	6' 1" (1.85 m)	190 lb (86 kg)	2000-10-30	Stittsville, Ontario	Youngstown Phantoms (USHL)	—
18	(Canada)	Jakob Lee	Sophomore	F	6' 0" (1.83 m)	185 lb (84 kg)	1999-02-12	Owen Sound, Ontario	Merrimack (HEA)	—
19	(United States)	Ture Linden	Senior	F	6' 0" (1.83 m)	190 lb (86 kg)	1997-07-06	Great Falls, Virginia	Lone Star Brahmas (NAHL)	—
20	(United States)	Henri Schreifels	Freshman	F	6' 1" (1.85 m)	195 lb (88 kg)	2000-07-01	Newbury Park, California	Victoria Grizzlies (BCHL)	—
21	(United States)	Louie Helsen	Junior	D	6' 2" (1.88 m)	200 lb (91 kg)	1998-06-08	Dallas, Texas	Amarillo Bulls (NAHL)	—
22	(France)	Justin Addamo	Senior	F	6' 6" (1.98 m)	227 lb (103 kg)	1998-05-27	Clermont-Ferrand, France	Robert Morris (AHA)	—
23	(United States)	Jake Johnson	Senior	D	6' 0" (1.83 m)	185 lb (84 kg)	1998-08-13	Bloomington, Minnesota	Cedar Rapids RoughRiders (USHL)	—
24	(United States)	Jack Brackett	Sophomore	F	5' 10" (1.78 m)	180 lb (82 kg)	2000-12-31	Manassas, Virginia	Maryland Black Bears (NAHL)	—
25	(Canada)	Ryan Mahshie	Junior	F	6' 3" (1.91 m)	210 lb (95 kg)	1999-04-05	Stoney Creek, Ontario	Brooks Bandits (AJHL)	—
26	(United States)	Shane Sellar	Graduate	F	6' 3" (1.91 m)	200 lb (91 kg)	1997-06-14	Carlisle, Pennsylvania	Dartmouth (ECAC)	—
27	(Canada)	Jake Gagnon	Sophomore	F	5' 10" (1.78 m)	170 lb (77 kg)	1999-11-04	Pointe-Claire, Quebec	Wellington Dukes (OJHL)	—
28	(United States)	Kyle Hallbauer	Senior	D	5' 11" (1.8 m)	190 lb (86 kg)	1997-03-02	Howell, New Jersey	Lone Star Brahmas (NAHL)	—
30	(United States)	Brett Miller	Sophomore	G	6' 0" (1.83 m)	185 lb (84 kg)	1999-04-26	Northville, Michigan	Austin Bruins (NAHL)	—
34	(Canada)	Jack Watson	Freshman	G	6' 3" (1.91 m)	195 lb (88 kg)	2000-03-14	Toronto, Ontario	Coquitlam Express (BCHL)	—
39	(Slovakia)	Jakub Lacka	Senior	F	6' 0" (1.83 m)	190 lb (86 kg)	1998-11-20	Bratislava, Slovakia	Central Illinois Flying Aces (USHL)	—

== Standings ==
2021–22 ECAC Hockey Standings
	Conference record										Overall record					
	GP	W	L	T	OTW	OTL	3/SW	PTS	GF	GA	GP	W	L	T	GF	GA
#8 Quinnipiac †	22	17	4	1	0	1	1	54	71	14	42	32	7	3	139	53
#17 Clarkson	22	14	4	4	0	2	3	51	86	47	37	21	10	6	123	85
#15 Harvard *	22	14	6	2	0	0	2	46	69	46	35	21	11	3	116	82
Cornell	22	12	6	4	2	1	0	39	73	47	32	18	10	4	100	72
Colgate	22	9	9	4	1	0	3	33	55	57	40	18	18	4	111	112
Rensselaer	22	10	12	0	0	0	0	30	58	63	44	18	23	3	114	119
Union	22	9	11	2	3	1	0	27	52	66	37	14	19	4	89	110
St. Lawrence	22	7	10	5	2	0	2	26	44	60	37	11	19	7	72	110
Brown	22	6	12	4	0	1	2	25	36	61	31	7	20	4	50	100
Princeton	22	7	14	1	0	1	0	23	54	89	31	8	21	2	70	122
Yale	22	7	14	1	3	1	1	21	38	60	30	8	21	1	55	90
Dartmouth	22	5	15	2	0	3	1	21	45	71	32	7	22	3	69	110
Championship: March 19, 2022 † indicates conference regular season champion (Cleary Cup) * indicates conference tournament champion (Whitelaw Cup); Rankings: USCHO.com Top 20 Poll

== Schedule and results ==
Date	Time	Opponent^{#}	Rank^{#}	Site	TV	Decision	Result	Attendance	Record
Exhibition
October 2	4:00 PM	at Union*		Achilles Rink • Schenectady, New York (Exhibition)			W 5–2	0	
Regular season
October 8	7:00 PM	Bowling Green*		Houston Field House • Troy, New York		Marshall	T 2–2 ^{OT}	484	0–0–1
October 9	7:00 PM	Bowling Green*		Houston Field House • Troy, New York		Marshall	L 2–3 ^{OT}	361	0–1–1
October 15	7:00 PM	Canisius*		Houston Field House • Troy, New York		Marshall	W 7–3	370	1–1–1
October 16	7:00 PM	Canisius*		Houston Field House • Troy, New York		Watson	L 2–3 ^{OT}	304	1–2–1
October 23	7:00 PM	at Vermont*		Gutterson Fieldhouse • Burlington, Vermont		Marshall	W 2–1	2,882	2–2–1
October 29	7:00 PM	at Union		Achilles Rink • Schenectady, New York		Marshall	W 4–2	1,738	3–2–1 (1–0–0)
October 30	7:00 PM	Union		Houston Field House • Troy, New York		Marshall	W 3–0	693	4–2–1 (2–0–0)
November 5	7:00 PM	St. Lawrence		Houston Field House • Troy, New York		Marshall	L 3–4	344	4–3–1 (2–1–0)
November 6	7:00 PM	Clarkson		Houston Field House • Troy, New York		Marshall	W 3–1	261	5–3–1 (3–1–0)
November 12	7:00 PM	at Colgate		Class of 1965 Arena • Hamilton, New York		Marshall	L 2–5	350	5–4–1 (3–2–0)
November 13	7:00 PM	at #13 Cornell		Lynah Rink • Ithaca, New York		Marshall	L 3–11	2,322	5–5–1 (3–3–0)
November 19	7:00 PM	Long Island*		Houston Field House • Troy, New York		Marshall	W 7–2	404	6–5–1
November 20	8:00 PM	at Long Island*		Northwell Health Ice Center • East Meadow, New York		Marshall	T 2–2 ^{OT}	137	6–5–2
November 26	7:00 PM	#16 Northeastern*		Houston Field House • Troy, New York		Marshall	L 1–2	32	6–6–2
November 28	3:00 PM	at #16 Northeastern*		Matthews Arena • Boston, Massachusetts	NESN	Marshall	L 1–2	1,387	6–7–2
December 3	7:00 PM	#4 Quinnipiac		Houston Field House • Troy, New York		Marshall	L 0–2	252	6–8–2 (3–4–0)
December 4	7:00 PM	Princeton		Houston Field House • Troy, New York		Marshall	W 4–1	297	7–8–2 (4–4–0)
December 10	11:07 PM	at Alaska*		Carlson Center • Fairbanks, Alaska		Marshall	W 4–1	1,134	8–8–2
December 11	11:07 PM	at Alaska*		Carlson Center • Fairbanks, Alaska		Marshall	L 0–4	1,325	8–9–2
December 14	11:07 PM	at Alaska*		Carlson Center • Fairbanks, Alaska		Marshall	L 2–3	1,033	8–10–2
December 15	11:07 PM	at Alaska*		Carlson Center • Fairbanks, Alaska		Marshall	L 1–4	1,205	8–11–2
December 30	2:00 PM	Vermont*		Houston Field House • Troy, New York		Watson	W 3–2	2,195	9–11–2
January 2	2:05 PM	at Army*		Tate Rink • West Point, New York		Marshall	T 3–3 ^{OT}	1,712	9–11–3
January 16	7:00 PM	at Clarkson		Cheel Arena • Potsdam, New York		Miller	L 0–5	2,069	9–12–3 (4–5–0)
January 17	7:00 PM	at St. Lawrence		Appleton Arena • Canton, New York		Watson	W 4–0	412	10–12–3 (5–5–0)
January 21	7:00 PM	Yale		Houston Field House • Troy, New York		Watson	L 3–5	0	10–13–3 (5–6–0)
January 22	7:00 PM	Brown		Houston Field House • Troy, New York		Marshall	L 2–3	0	10–14–3 (5–7–0)
January 25	7:00 PM	at Harvard		Bright-Landry Hockey Center • Boston, Massachusetts		Watson	W 2–0	781	11–14–3 (6–7–0)
January 29	2:00 PM	vs. Union*		Times Union Center • Albany, New York (Mayor's Cup)		Watson	L 0–2	4,222	11–15–3
February 1	7:00 PM	at Dartmouth		Thompson Arena • Hanover, New Hampshire		Watson	W 2–0	101	12–15–3 (7–7–0)
February 4	7:00 PM	at Princeton		Hobey Baker Memorial Rink • Princeton, New Jersey		Watson	L 2–3	1,141	12–16–3 (7–8–0)
February 5	7:00 PM	at #2 Quinnipiac		People's United Center • Hamden, Connecticut		Marshall	L 0–1	0	12–17–3 (7–9–0)
February 11	7:00 PM	#16 Cornell		Houston Field House • Troy, New York		Watson	W 6–2	200	13–17–3 (8–9–0)
February 12	7:00 PM	Colgate		Houston Field House • Troy, New York		Watson	L 2–3	430	13–18–3 (8–10–0)
February 18	7:00 PM	at Brown		Meehan Auditorium • Providence, Rhode Island		Watson	W 4–2	291	14–18–3 (9–10–0)
February 19	7:00 PM	at Yale		Ingalls Rink • New Haven, Connecticut		Watson	L 2–5	984	14–19–3 (9–11–0)
February 25	7:00 PM	Dartmouth		Houston Field House • Troy, New York		Marshall	W 6–3	200	15–19–3 (10–11–0)
February 26	7:00 PM	Harvard		Houston Field House • Troy, New York		Marshall	L 1–5	478	15–20–3 (10–12–0)
ECAC Hockey Tournament
March 4	7:00 PM	Dartmouth*		Houston Field House • Troy, New York (First Round game 1)		Watson	L 2–3	800	15–21–3
March 5	7:00 PM	Dartmouth*		Houston Field House • Troy, New York (First Round game 2)		Watson	W 3–2	851	16–21–3
March 6	7:00 PM	Dartmouth*		Houston Field House • Troy, New York (First Round game 3)		Watson	W 5–3	579	17–21–3
Rensselaer Won Series 2–1
March 11	7:00 PM	at Harvard*		Bright-Landry Hockey Center • Boston, Massachusetts (Quarterfinal game 1)		Watson	L 3–4 ^{OT}	778	17–22–3
March 12	7:00 PM	at Harvard*		Bright-Landry Hockey Center • Boston, Massachusetts (Quarterfinal game 2)		Watson	W 4–3 ^{2OT}	765	18–22–3
March 13	4:00 PM	at Harvard*		Bright-Landry Hockey Center • Boston, Massachusetts (Quarterfinal game 3)		Watson	L 1–3	477	18–23–3
Rensselaer Lost Series 1–2
*Non-conference game. ^{#}Rankings from USCHO.com Poll. All times are in Eastern Time. Source:

== Scoring statistics ==
Name	Position	Games	Goals	Assists	Points	PIM
Ture Linden	F	44	20	19	39	10
Ottoville Leppänen	F	42	9	21	30	31
Simon Kjellberg	D	43	8	19	27	16
Jakub Lacka	LW	42	8	17	25	16
Zach Dubinsky	F	44	10	10	20	24
Ryan Mahshie	D	38	7	13	20	4
Justin Addamo	RW	42	14	5	19	43
T. J. Walsh	LW	36	4	15	19	4
Jake Johnson	D	40	2	14	16	26
Anthony Baxter	D	41	2	13	15	40
John Beaton	C	41	4	9	13	8
Shane Sellar	F	39	7	5	12	10
Lauri Sertti	D	40	2	6	8	59
Jakob Lee	C	27	4	3	7	25
Kyle Hallbauer	D	39	2	5	7	25
Robert Herrman	F	33	3	3	6	6
Jack Brackett	F	26	2	3	5	6
Mason Klee	D	36	2	3	5	14
Jack Agnew	D	41	1	4	5	8
James McIsaac	C/RW	11	1	1	2	0
Jake Gagnon	F	20	1	1	2	0
Dylan Davies	D/F	8	0	2	2	6
Reid Leibold	F	6	1	0	1	6
Nick Bowman	F	22	0	1	1	8
Altti Nykänen	F	2	0	0	0	0
Brett Miller	G	6	0	0	0	0
Louis Helsen	D	9	0	0	0	0
Henri Schreifels	F	18	0	0	0	0
Jack Watson	G	22	0	0	0	0
Linden Marshall	G	26	0	0	0	0
Bench	-	-	-	-	-	0
Total			114	190	304	397

== Goaltending statistics ==
Name	Games	Minutes	Wins	Losses	Ties	Goals against	Saves	Shut outs	SV %	GAA
Jack Watson	22	1103	9	9	0	44	519	3	.922	2.29
Linden Marshall	26	1491	9	13	3	63	535	1	.895	2.53
Brett Miller	6	62	0	1	0	5	35	0	.875	4.79
Empty Net	-	23	-	-	-	5	-	-	-	-
Total	44	2684	18	23	3	119	1089	4	.901	2.66

== Rankings ==
Poll	Week																									
Poll	Pre	1	2	3	4	5	6	7	8	9	10	11	12	13	14	15	16	17	18	19	20	21	22	23	24	25 (Final)
USCHO.com	NR	NR	NR	NR	NR	NR	NR	NR	NR	NR	NR	NR	NR	NR	NR	NR	NR	NR	NR	NR	NR	NR	NR	NR	-	NR
USA Today	NR	NR	NR	NR	NR	NR	NR	NR	NR	NR	NR	NR	NR	NR	NR	NR	NR	NR	NR	NR	NR	NR	NR	NR	NR	NR

Note: USCHO did not release a poll in week 24.

== Awards and honors ==
Player	Award	Ref
Ture Linden	ECAC Hockey Second Team	
