= 2021–22 Quinnipiac Bobcats men's ice hockey season =

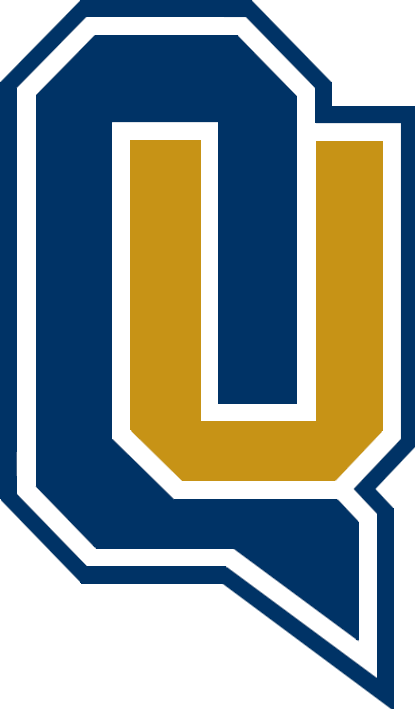

ECAC Hockey, champion NCAA tournament, Midwest Regional final
- Conference: 1st ECAC Hockey
- Home ice: People's United Center

Rankings
- USCHO: #7
- USA Today: #7

Record
- Overall: 28–5–3
- Conference: 17–4–1
- Home: 14–2–1
- Road: 12–3–1
- Neutral: 2–0–1

Coaches and captains
- Head coach: Rand Pecknold
- Assistant coaches: Joe Dumais; Mike Corbett; Justin Eddy
- Captain: Wyatt Bongiovanni
- Alternate captain(s): Ethan de Jong; Zach Metsa

The 2021–22 Quinnipiac Bobcats men's ice hockey season was the 46th season of play for the program. They represented Quinnipiac University in the 2021–22 NCAA Division I men's ice hockey season and for the 17th season in the ECAC Hockey conference. The Bobcats were coached by Rand Pecknold, in his 28th season, and played their home games at the People's United Center.

== Season ==
=== Regular season ===
Quinnipiac began the season with high hopes of building on their recent success. The biggest question early in the year was how the team would replace the now-departed Keith Petruzzelli in goal. Graduate transfer Dylan St. Cyr was the obvious choice for the Bobcats; however, he was injured in the first game of the season. Backup Yaniv Perets, a sophomore who had played just 32 minutes all of the year before, finished the game and then posted his first career shutout in the Ice Breaker Tournament consolation match. St. Cyr returned the following game, earning a shutout of his own, but head coach Rand Pecknold had seen something special with his young goalie. Buoyed by a suffocating defensive system, both goaltenders performed well and led the Bobcats to an enviable record early in the season.

Though the team was hampered by a weak schedule, that did not stop Quinnipiac from earning the #2 ranking on the strength of an astounding 14–1–3 record when they paused for their winter break. By that time the team was already the top defensive club in the nation with 8 shutouts shared between their two starters. The start to their second half was delayed by COVID-19 positives but that did not slow down the Bobcats. The team continued winning and was the top-ranked team in the nation in mid-January. A narrow loss to Cornell dropped Quinnipiac down to #2 but the team responded by winning their next seven games.

As the regular season wound down, it was apparent that the team's biggest weakness was its offense. Though they were one of the top scoring teams in ECAC Hockey, the Bobcats' offense had not been consistent during the course of the season. The team went through stretches where they could not score with their impenetrable goaltending being the only reason the Bobcats would win. Over the final three weeks of the season, the lack of scoring punch cost Quinnipiac three games against good teams. While the losses did not harm their NCAA tournament hopes, they did prevent the Bobcats from earning a top seed for the tournament.

=== Postseason ===
Even with the subpar end, Quinnipiac earned their second consecutive regular season title. As they entered the postseason, Quinnipiac had already set the record for most shutouts by a team in one season with 16. They had broken the record held by 1999–2000 Niagara (12) with Perets just one behind Greg Gardner for the individual single-season mark. Despite facing rather weak opposition in the quarterfinals, Quinnipiac struggled against St. Lawrence and had to come back from a 2-goal deficit to win the second game in overtime. After downing the Cinderella hopes of Colgate in the semifinal, Quinnipiac was challenged by a rising Harvard squad who were playing for the season. The Bobcats widely outshot the Crimson, 49–17, but were never able to gain a lead in the match. Harvard's defense held and Perets was unable to stop the winning goal from getting by his glove in overtime.

As they entered the NCAA tournament, Quinnipiac received a #2 seed; however, they were set against the defending national runners-up, St. Cloud State. Before the game began, the scales were tilted in the Bobcats' favor due to the opposing starter being unable to play due to pneumonia. As it turned out, the Bobcats needed all the luck they could get. The team played its worst game all season, getting outshot 16–34 with Perets allowing a season-high 4 goals. It was only though the ineffective netminding in the St. Cloud end that Quinnipiac managed to squeak by with a 5–4 victory.

For their second game, Quinnipiac knew they were facing a tougher fight in top-seeded Michigan and they would have to play much better if they had any chance at victory. Early on, nothing seemed to go right for the Bobcats. They were not able to get any traction in the game and found themselves down 0–4 after two periods. Needing to wake his team up, Pecknold replaced Perets with St. Cyr in goal for the start of third and the Bobcats rose to the occasion. Quinnipiac completely took over the game in the final frame, peppering the Wolverine cage with shot after shot until Jayden Lee finally broke through. The score remained unchanged for about five minutes but the assault continued. Around the mid-way point of the period, Quinnipiac netted 2 goals in the span of 2 minutes, cutting the lead to 1 with just under nine minutes to play. With Michigan reeling, it appeared that the Bobcats may have had a shot at upsetting the championship favorites. While the Wolverines shored up their defense, they could not keep the puck away from Quinnipiac and the bobcats attacked relentlessly. Despite the constant threat of scoring, Pecknold pulled St. Cyr for an extra attacker with 4 minutes to play, much earlier than 1-goal deficit typically required. The gambit failed almost immediately as a bad pass in the Michigan zone ended up being skated down the ice into a vacated cage. Two successive goals put the game out of reach and Quinnipiac's season was over.

== Departures ==
Player	Position	Nationality	Cause
Logan Britt	Defenseman	United States	Transferred to Sacred Heart
Corey Clifton	Forward	United States	Transferred to Massachusetts–Boston
Peter Diliberatore	Defenseman	Canada	Signed professional contract (Vegas Golden Knights)
Matt Fawcett	Forward	United States	Transferred to Maine
Evan Fear	Goaltender	United States	Transferred to Northeastern
Tyler Ghirardosi	Forward	Canada	Transferred to Holy Cross
Josh Mayanja	Goaltender	United States	Graduation (signed with Pensacola Ice Flyers)
Joe O'Connor	Defenseman	United States	Graduation (retired)
Keith Petruzzelli	Goaltender	United States	Graduation (signed with Toronto Marlies)
Odeen Tufto	Forward	United States	Graduation (signed with Tampa Bay Lightning)
Daniel Winslow	Forward	United States	Transferred to New England

== Recruiting ==
Player	Position	Nationality	Age	Notes
Noah Altman	Goaltender	United States	21	Los Angeles, CA
Jack Babbage	Defenseman	United States	21	Tully, NY
Oliver Chau	Forward	Canada	24	Oakville, ON; graduate transfer from Massachusetts
Brendan Less	Defenseman	United States	23	Kinnelon, NJ; graduate transfer from Dartmouth
Liam McLinskey	Forward	United States	20	Pearl River, NY
Griffin Mendel	Defenseman	Canada	22	Kelowna, BC; graduate transfer from Denver
Jacob Quillan	Forward	Canada	19	Dartmouth, NS
Dylan St. Cyr	Goaltender	United States	22	Las Vegas, NV; graduate transfer from Notre Dame
Tony Stillwell	Defenseman	United States	24	Green Bay, WI; graduate transfer from Brown
Cristophe Tellier	Forward	Canada	21	Sherbrooke, QC

== Roster ==
As of August 19, 2021

No.	Nat.	Player	Class	Pos	Height	Weight	DoB	Hometown	Previous team	NHL rights
1	(Canada)	Yaniv Perets	Sophomore	G	6' 1" (1.85 m)	180 lb (82 kg)	2000-03-04	Dollard-des-Ormeaux, Quebec	Penticton Vees (BCHL)	—
2	(Finland)	Iivari Räsänen	Sophomore	D	6' 1" (1.85 m)	200 lb (91 kg)	2001-05-23	Tampere, Finland	Muskegon Lumberjacks (USHL)	—
3	(United States)	Jack Babbage	Freshman	D	6' 1" (1.85 m)	192 lb (87 kg)	2000-08-30	Tully, New York	Chicago Steel (USHL)	—
4	(United States)	Michael Lombardi	Senior	D	6' 0" (1.83 m)	190 lb (86 kg)	1998-08-20	Barrington, Rhode Island	West Kelowna Warriors (BCHL)	—
5	(United States)	C. J. McGee	Junior	D	6' 0" (1.83 m)	180 lb (82 kg)	1999-03-12	Pearl River, New York	Shreveport Mudbugs (NAHL)	—
6	(Canada)	Griffin Mendel	Graduate	D	6' 6" (1.98 m)	220 lb (100 kg)	1999-02-18	Kelowna, British Columbia	Denver (NCHC)	—
7	(United States)	Marcus Chorney	Senior	D	6' 1" (1.85 m)	190 lb (86 kg)	1997-09-16	Hastings, Minnesota	Amarillo Bulls (NAHL)	—
8	(Canada)	Nick Bochen	Sophomore	D	5' 9" (1.75 m)	165 lb (75 kg)	2001-08-29	North Vancouver, British Columbia	Prince George Spruce Kings (BCHL)	—
10	(Canada)	Ethan de Jong (A)	Senior	F	5' 11" (1.8 m)	180 lb (82 kg)	1999-07-12	North Vancouver, British Columbia	Prince George Spruce Kings (BCHL)	—
11	(United States)	Wyatt Bongiovanni (C)	Senior	F	6' 0" (1.83 m)	195 lb (88 kg)	1999-07-24	Birmingham, Michigan	Muskegon Lumberjacks (USHL)	—
12	(Canada)	Oliver Chau	Graduate	F	5' 9" (1.75 m)	164 lb (74 kg)	1997-08-21	Oakville, Ontario	Massachusetts (HEA)	—
13	(Canada)	Christophe Fillion	Sophomore	F	5' 10" (1.78 m)	175 lb (79 kg)	2000-06-18	Sherbrooke, Quebec	Muskegon Lumberjacks (USHL)	—
14	(Canada)	Ethan Leyh	Junior	F	6' 0" (1.83 m)	195 lb (88 kg)	2001-06-07	Anmore, British Columbia	Langley Rivermen (BCHL)	—
15	(Canada)	Jayden Lee	Junior	D	5' 9" (1.75 m)	155 lb (70 kg)	2001-01-10	North Vancouver, British Columbia	Powell River Kings (BCHL)	—
16	(Canada)	Jacob Quillan	Freshman	F	6' 0" (1.83 m)	201 lb (91 kg)	2002-02-02	Dartmouth, Nova Scotia	Penticton Vees (BCHL)	—
17	(United States)	Joey Cipollone	Junior	F	5' 11" (1.8 m)	185 lb (84 kg)	1999-07-12	Purchase, New York	Tri-City Storm (USHL)	—
18	(United States)	Tony Stillwell	Senior	D	5' 9" (1.75 m)	170 lb (77 kg)	1997-04-18	Green Bay, Wisconsin	Brown (ECAC)	—
19	(United States)	T. J. Friedmann	Senior	F	6' 2" (1.88 m)	180 lb (82 kg)	1998-02-27	St. Louis, Missouri	Victoria Grizzlies (BCHL)	—
22	(United States)	Skyler Brind'Amour	Junior	F	6' 2" (1.88 m)	185 lb (84 kg)	1999-07-27	Raleigh, North Carolina	Chilliwack Chiefs (BCHL)	EDM, 177th overall 2017
23	(United States)	Zach Metsa (A)	Senior	D	5' 9" (1.75 m)	180 lb (82 kg)	1998-10-19	Delafield, Wisconsin	Central Illinois Flying Aces (USHL)	—
24	(United States)	Brendan Less	Graduate	D	5' 11" (1.8 m)	170 lb (77 kg)	1998-04-24	Kinnelon, New Jersey	Dartmouth (ECAC)	—
26	(Netherlands)	Guus van Nes	Junior (RS)	F	6' 3" (1.91 m)	205 lb (93 kg)	1997-02-14	Hendrik-Ido-Ambacht, Netherlands	Boston Junior Bruins (NCDC)	—
27	(Canada)	Desi Burgart	Senior	F	6' 1" (1.85 m)	185 lb (84 kg)	1998-09-28	North Vancouver, British Columbia	Surrey Eagles (BCHL)	—
28	(United States)	Liam McLinskey	Freshman	F	6' 3" (1.91 m)	165 lb (75 kg)	2001-02-20	Pearl River, New York	Jersey Hitmen (NCDC)	—
29	(Canada)	Cristophe Tellier	Freshman	F	6' 0" (1.83 m)	172 lb (78 kg)	2000-05-23	Sherbrooke, Quebec	Muskegon Lumberjacks (USHL)	—
30	(United States)	Dylan St. Cyr	Graduate	G	5' 8" (1.73 m)	167 lb (76 kg)	1999-05-23	Northville, Michigan	Notre Dame (Big Ten)	—
31	(United States)	Noah Altman	Freshman	G	6' 7" (2.01 m)	209 lb (95 kg)	2000-08-16	Los Angeles, California	Bismarck Bobcats (NAHL)	—
96	(United States)	Ty Smilanic	Sophomore	F	6' 1" (1.85 m)	178 lb (81 kg)	2002-01-20	Denver, Colorado	USNTDP (USHL)	FLA, 74th overall 2020

== Standings ==
2021–22 ECAC Hockey Standings
	Conference record										Overall record					
	GP	W	L	T	OTW	OTL	3/SW	PTS	GF	GA	GP	W	L	T	GF	GA
#8 Quinnipiac †	22	17	4	1	0	1	1	54	71	14	42	32	7	3	139	53
#17 Clarkson	22	14	4	4	0	2	3	51	86	47	37	21	10	6	123	85
#15 Harvard *	22	14	6	2	0	0	2	46	69	46	35	21	11	3	116	82
Cornell	22	12	6	4	2	1	0	39	73	47	32	18	10	4	100	72
Colgate	22	9	9	4	1	0	3	33	55	57	40	18	18	4	111	112
Rensselaer	22	10	12	0	0	0	0	30	58	63	44	18	23	3	114	119
Union	22	9	11	2	3	1	0	27	52	66	37	14	19	4	89	110
St. Lawrence	22	7	10	5	2	0	2	26	44	60	37	11	19	7	72	110
Brown	22	6	12	4	0	1	2	25	36	61	31	7	20	4	50	100
Princeton	22	7	14	1	0	1	0	23	54	89	31	8	21	2	70	122
Yale	22	7	14	1	3	1	1	21	38	60	30	8	21	1	55	90
Dartmouth	22	5	15	2	0	3	1	21	45	71	32	7	22	3	69	110
Championship: March 19, 2022 † indicates conference regular season champion (Cleary Cup) * indicates conference tournament champion (Whitelaw Cup); Rankings: USCHO.com Top 20 Poll

== Schedule and results ==
Date	Time	Opponent^{#}	Rank^{#}	Site	TV	Decision	Result	Attendance	Record
Exhibition
October 2		vs. Maine*	#9	Phillips Exeter Academy Rink • Exeter, New Hampshire (Exhibition)			W 7–0		—
Ice Breaker Tournament
October 8	4:30 p.m.	vs. #6 Boston College*	#9	DCU Center • Worcester, Massachusetts (Ice Breaker Game 1)	NESN+	Perets	T 2–2 ^{SOL}	0	0–0–1
October 9	4:30 p.m.	vs. #18 Northeastern*	#9	DCU Center • Worcester, Massachusetts (Ice Breaker Game 2)		Perets	W 3–0	872	1–0–1
Regular season
October 16	7:00 p.m.	at Vermont*	#8	Gutterson Fieldhouse • Burlington, Vermont		St. Cyr	W 2–0	3,037	2–0–1
October 22	7:00 p.m.	#6 North Dakota*	#7	People's United Center • Hamden, Connecticut		Perets	W 5–2	3,498	3–0–1
October 23	7:00 p.m.	#6 North Dakota*	#7	People's United Center • Hamden, Connecticut		St. Cyr	L 1–3	3,512	3–1–1
October 26	7:00 p.m.	Holy Cross*	#5	People's United Center • Hamden, Connecticut		St. Cyr	W 5–2	2,502	4–1–1
October 29	7:05 PM	at American International*	#5	MassMutual Center • Springfield, Massachusetts		St. Cyr	T 2–2 ^{OT}	487	4–1–2
October 30	7:00 p.m.	American International*	#5	People's United Center • Hamden, Connecticut		St. Cyr	W 2–1 ^{OT}	3,426	5–1–2
November 5	7:00 p.m.	at Yale	#6	Ingalls Rink • New Haven, Connecticut		Perets	W 3–0	1,200	6–1–2 (1–0–0)
November 6	7:00 p.m.	at Brown	#6	Meehan Auditorium • Providence, Rhode Island		Perets	W 1–0	383	7–1–2 (2–0–0)
November 12	7:00 p.m.	Arizona State*	#5	People's United Center • Hamden, Connecticut		Perets	W 5–3	3,050	8–1–2
November 13	7:00 p.m.	Arizona State*	#5	People's United Center • Hamden, Connecticut		St. Cyr	W 5–2	2,928	9–1–2
November 19	7:00 p.m.	Clarkson	#5	People's United Center • Hamden, Connecticut		Perets	T 2–2 ^{SOW}	2,521	9–1–3 (2–0–1)
November 20	7:00 p.m.	St. Lawrence	#5	People's United Center • Hamden, Connecticut		Perets	W 8–0	2,217	10–1–3 (3–0–1)
December 3	7:00 p.m.	at Rensselaer	#4	Houston Field House • Troy, New York		Perets	W 2–0	252	11–1–3 (4–0–1)
December 4	7:00 p.m.	at Union	#4	Achilles Rink • Schenectady, New York		Perets	W 4–0	1,723	12–1–3 (5–0–1)
December 10	7:00 p.m.	at Long Island*	#2	Northwell Health Ice Center • East Meadow, New York		Perets	W 4–1	672	13–1–3
December 11	7:00 p.m.	at Long Island*	#2	People's United Center • Hamden, Connecticut		St. Cyr	W 5–0	2,890	14–1–3
January 14	7:00 p.m.	#18 Harvard	#2	People's United Center • Hamden, Connecticut		Perets	W 3–0	0	15–1–3 (6–0–1)
January 16	7:00 p.m.	Dartmouth	#2	People's United Center • Hamden, Connecticut		St. Cyr	W 3–1	2,108	16–1–3 (7–0–1)
January 18	4:00 p.m.	Princeton	#1	People's United Center • Hamden, Connecticut		Perets	W 9–0	1,897	17–1–3 (8–0–1)
January 21	7:00 p.m.	at Colgate	#1	Class of 1965 Arena • Hamilton, New York		Perets	W 5–1	607	18–1–3 (9–0–1)
January 22	7:00 p.m.	at #8 Cornell	#1	Lynah Rink • Ithaca, New York		Perets	L 1–2 ^{OT}	2,133	18–2–3 (9–1–1)
January 26	7:00 p.m.	at Princeton	#2	Hobey Baker Memorial Rink • Princeton, New Jersey		St. Cyr	W 6–0	0	19–2–3 (10–1–1)
Connecticut Ice
January 29	7:00 p.m.	at Sacred Heart*	#2	Webster Bank Arena • Bridgeport, Connecticut (Connecticut Ice semifinal)	SNY	St. Cyr	W 3–2 ^{OT}	0	20–2–3
January 30	4:30 p.m.	vs. Connecticut*	#2	Webster Bank Arena • Bridgeport, Connecticut (Connecticut Ice championship)	SNY	Perets	W 2–0	0	21–2–3
Regular season
February 4	7:00 p.m.	Union	#2	People's United Center • Hamden, Connecticut		Perets	W 2–1	2,939	22–2–3 (11–1–1)
February 5	7:00 p.m.	Rensselaer	#2	People's United Center • Hamden, Connecticut		Perets	W 1–0	0	23–2–3 (12–1–1)
February 8	7:00 p.m.	Brown	#2	People's United Center • Hamden, Connecticut		Perets	W 3–1	1,813	24–2–3 (13–1–1)
February 11	7:00 p.m.	at St. Lawrence	#2	Appleton Arena • Canton, New York		Perets	W 3–1	651	25–2–3 (14–1–1)
February 12	7:00 p.m.	at #19 Clarkson	#2	Cheel Arena • Potsdam, New York		Perets	L 1–3	2,654	25–3–3 (14–2–1)
February 18	7:00 p.m.	at Dartmouth	#4	Thompson Arena • Hanover, New Hampshire		St. Cyr	W 5–0	978	26–3–3 (15–2–1)
February 19	7:00 p.m.	at Harvard	#4	Bright-Landry Hockey Center • Boston, Massachusetts		Perets	L 0–1	1,823	26–4–3 (15–3–1)
February 22	7:00 p.m.	Yale	#5	People's United Center • Hamden, Connecticut		Perets	W 4–0	3,625	27–4–3 (16–3–1)
February 25	7:00 p.m.	#18 Cornell	#5	People's United Center • Hamden, Connecticut		Perets	L 0–1	3,027	27–5–3 (16–4–1)
February 26	7:00 p.m.	Colgate	#5	People's United Center • Hamden, Connecticut		St. Cyr	W 4–0	3,061	28–5–3 (17–4–1)
ECAC Hockey tournament
March 11	7:00 p.m.	St. Lawrence*	#6	People's United Center • Hamden, Connecticut (Quarterfinal game 1)		Perets	W 4–1	2,739	29–5–3
March 12	7:00 p.m.	St. Lawrence*	#6	People's United Center • Hamden, Connecticut (Quarterfinal game 2)		Perets	W 4–3 ^{OT}	2,401	30–5–3
Quinnipiac won series 2–0
March 18	4:00 p.m.	vs. Colgate*	#6	Herb Brooks Arena • Lake Placid, New York (Semifinal)		Perets	W 3–1	4,256	31–5–3
March 19	7:30 p.m.	vs. #17 Harvard*	#6	Herb Brooks Arena • Lake Placid, New York (Championship)		Perets	L 2–3 ^{OT}	4,478	31–6–3
NCAA tournament
March 25	8:00 p.m.	vs. #11 St. Cloud State*	#8	PPL Center • Allentown, Pennsylvania (Midwest Regional semifinal)	ESPNews	Perets	W 5–4	2,155	32–6–3
March 27	6:30 p.m.	vs. #2 Michigan*	#8	PPL Center • Allentown, Pennsylvania (Midwest Regional final)	ESPN2	Perets	L 4–7	3,256	32–7–3
*Non-conference game. ^{#}Rankings from USCHO.com Poll. All times are in Eastern. Source:

== Scoring statistics ==
Name	Position	Games	Goals	Assists	Points	PIM
Zach Metsa	D	42	10	27	37	8
Wyatt Bongiovanni	C	42	16	18	34	45
Oliver Chau	C	42	13	20	33	24
Ethan de Jong	RW	42	11	21	32	24
Michael Lombardi	F	42	14	13	27	10
Ty Smilanic	C	41	13	10	23	34
T. J. Friedmann	F	41	10	13	23	14
Brendan Less	D	39	4	16	20	12
Skyler Brind'Amour	C	41	3	17	20	18
Joey Cipollone	C	41	10	8	18	8
Desi Burgart	F	42	8	9	17	6
Guus van Nes	LW/RW	37	6	11	17	26
Jayden Lee	D	42	6	10	16	2
Griffin Mendel	D	42	5	10	15	14
Ethan Leyh	F	31	3	7	10	24
Jacob Quillan	C	36	2	7	9	24
Marcus Chorney	D	42	3	5	8	12
Ilvari Räsänen	D	40	0	5	5	16
Christophe Fillion	F	19	0	4	4	6
Cristophe Tellier	LW	13	0	3	3	21
C. J. McGee	D	15	1	1	2	6
Tony Stillwell	D	14	0	2	2	2
Nick Bochen	D	9	1	0	1	0
Dylan St. Cyr	G	13	0	1	1	0
Yaniv Perets	G	31	0	1	1	0
Liam McLinskey	F	2	0	0	0	0
Bench	-	-	-	-	-	2
Total			139	239	378	358

== Goaltending statistics ==
Name	Games	Minutes	Wins	Losses	Ties	Goals against	Saves	Shutouts	SV %	GAA
Dylan St. Cyr	13	722	10	2	1	14	204	5	.936	1.16
Yaniv Perets	31	1842	22	5	2	36	559	11	.939	1.17
Empty Net	-	19	-	-	-	3	-	-	-	-
Total	42	2583	32	7	3	53	774	16	.936	1.23

== Rankings ==
Poll	Week																									
Poll	Pre	1	2	3	4	5	6	7	8	9	10	11	12	13	14	15	16	17	18	19	20	21	22	23	24	25 (Final)
USCHO.com	9	9	8	7	5	6	5	5	3 (6)	4 (6)	2 (15)	2 (12)	2 (7)	2 (5)	1 (30)	2 (18)	2 (14)	2 (12)	4	5	6	6	6	8	-	7
USA Today	9	9	8	7	5	6	5	5	4 (2)	4 (4)	2 (13)	2 (12)	2 (5)	2 (6)	1 (19)	2 (5)	2 (5)	2 (8)	4	5	6	6	6	7	7	7

Note: USCHO did not release a poll in week 24.

== Awards and honors ==
Player	Award	Ref
Zach Metsa	AHCA All-American East First Team	
Yaniv Perets	AHCA All-American East Second Team	
Yaniv Perets	ECAC Hockey Player of the Year	
Zach Metsa	ECAC Hockey Best Defensive Defenseman	
Yaniv Perets	Ken Dryden Award	
Rand Pecknold	Tim Taylor Award	
Yaniv Perets	ECAC Hockey First Team	
Zach Metsa	ECAC Hockey First Team	
Wyatt Bongiovanni	ECAC Hockey Third Team	
