= 2021–22 Dartmouth Big Green men's ice hockey season =

- Conference: T–11th ECAC Hockey
- Home ice: Thompson Arena

Rankings
- USCHO: NR
- USA Today: NR

Record
- Overall: 7–22–3
- Conference: 5–15–2
- Home: 4–10–1
- Road: 3–12–2

Coaches and captains
- Head coach: Reid Cashman
- Assistant coaches: Jason Tapp; Troy Thibodeau
- Captain: Harrison Markell

The 2021–22 Dartmouth Big Green Men's ice hockey season was the 115th season of play for the program and the 60th season in the ECAC Hockey conference. The Big Green represented the Dartmouth College and were coached by Reid Cashman, in his 1st season as head coach.

== Season ==
Dartmouth returned to the ice after their previous season was cancelled due to the COVID-19 pandemic. The Big Green began the year with a decent stretch, opening 2–3 with two of their losses coming against ranked teams. After a serviceable start, went winless in 6 consecutive games and ended the first half of their season near the bottom of the conference standings.

After Christmas, Dartmouth opened their annual in-season tournament with a win over in-state rival New Hampshire. Unfortunately for the Big Green, the team would not record another victory for a month and a half. The biggest problem for Dartmouth was a lack of offense that continued for most of the season. The goaltending they received during the stretch gave Dartmouth several chances to win but the team's scoring rarely made an appearance.

Near the end of the season, Dartmouth put together a few wins that just put them above Yale and prevented the Greens from finishing last in ECAC Hockey. That set them up for a showdown with Rensselaer in the conference tournament. When the team won its first match, it appeared that they may have accidentally found a way to extend their season. However, Dartmouth got into penalty trouble in the next two games, surrendering five power play goals, and lost both matches to end their year.

== Departures ==
| Player | Position | Nationality | Cause |
|---|---|---|---|
| Matt Baker | Forward | Canada | Graduate transfer to Massachusetts |
| Brendan Demler | Defenseman | United States | Graduation (retired) |
| Quin Foreman | Forward | United States | Graduation (signed with Indy Fuel) |
| Brendan Less | Defenseman | United States | Graduate transfer to Quinnipiac |
| Christian LeSueur | Forward | United States | Left program (retired) |
| Joey Matthews | Defenseman | United States | Graduate transfer to Canisius |
| Collin Rutherford | Forward | United States | Graduate transfer to Bentley |

== Recruiting ==
| Player | Position | Nationality | Age | Notes |
|---|---|---|---|---|
| Sean Chisholm | Forward | Canada | 20 | Caledonia, ON |
| Braiden Dorfman | Forward | United States | 21 | Nashville, TN |
| Matt Hubbarde | Forward | Canada | 21 | Pickering, ON |
| Trym Løkkeberg | Forward | Norway | 20 | Fredrikstad, NOR |
| Brady MacDonald | Defenseman | Canada | 21 | Dorchester, ON |
| Nate Morgan | Forward | Canada | 19 | Calgary, AB |
| Ian Pierce | Defenseman | United States | 20 | New York, NY |
| Steven Townley | Forward | United States | 21 | Quechee, VT |
| Dylan Witzke | Defenseman | Canada | 19 | Calgary, AB |

== Roster ==
As of August 19, 2021.

| No. | Nat. | Player | Class | Pos | Height | Weight | DoB | Hometown | Previous team | NHL rights |
|---|---|---|---|---|---|---|---|---|---|---|
| 2 | (United States) | Harrison Markell (C) | Senior | D | 6' 1" (1.85 m) | 185 lb (84 kg) | 1997-02-12 | Andover, Massachusetts | Boston Junior Bruins ([NCDC) | — |
| 3 | (Canada) | Dylan Witzke | Freshman | D | 5' 10" (1.78 m) | 165 lb (75 kg) | 2002-01-01 | Calgary, Alberta | Whitecourt Wolverines (AJHL) | — |
| 4 | (United States) | Tyler Borsch | Sophomore | D | 6' 0" (1.83 m) | 185 lb (84 kg) | 2000-03-27 | Maple Grove, Minnesota | St. Cloud Norsemen (NAHL) | — |
| 5 | (United States) | Brock Paul | Junior | D | 6' 3" (1.91 m) | 205 lb (93 kg) | 1999-11-10 | Carmel, Indiana | Waterloo Black Hawks (USHL) | — |
| 6 | (United States) | Tanner Palocsik | Junior | D | 5' 11" (1.8 m) | 190 lb (86 kg) | 1999-05-26 | Aliquippa, Pennsylvania | Jersey Hitmen (NCDC) | — |
| 7 | (Canada) | Jack Cameron | Junior | D | 6' 3" (1.91 m) | 190 lb (86 kg) | 1999-04-18 | Halifax, Nova Scotia | Coquitlam Express (BCHL) | — |
| 8 | (United States) | Joey Musa | Sophomore | F | 5' 9" (1.75 m) | 160 lb (73 kg) | 2000-06-11 | Orange Park, Florida | Langley Rivermen (BCHL) | — |
| 9 | (United States) | Ryan Lovett | Sophomore | F | 6' 2" (1.88 m) | 200 lb (91 kg) | 1999-07-06 | Franklin, Massachusetts | Boston Junior Bruins (NCDC) | — |
| 10 | (United States) | Ryan Sorkin | Sophomore | F | 5' 10" (1.78 m) | 175 lb (79 kg) | 2001-06-13 | Chicago, Illinois | Lone Star Brahmas (NAHL) | — |
| 11 | (United States) | Mark Gallant | Junior | F | 6' 0" (1.83 m) | 185 lb (84 kg) | 2000-05-01 | Concord, Massachusetts | Islanders Hockey Club (NCDC) | — |
| 12 | (Canada) | Nick Unruh | Sophomore | F | 6' 3" (1.91 m) | 205 lb (93 kg) | 2000-04-03 | Fort McMurray, Alberta | Salmon Arm Silverbacks (BCHL) | — |
| 14 | (United States) | Steven Townley | Freshman | F | 6' 2" (1.88 m) | 205 lb (93 kg) | 2000-06-13 | Quechee, Vermont | Jersey Hitmen (NCDC) | — |
| 15 | (Canada) | Sean Chisholm | Freshman | F | 6' 1" (1.85 m) | 190 lb (86 kg) | 2001-01-26 | Caledonia, Ontario | Brooks Bandits (AJHL) | — |
| 16 | (Canada) | Tyler Campbell | Junior | F | 5' 9" (1.75 m) | 170 lb (77 kg) | 1999-10-01 | Winnipeg, Manitoba | Brooks Bandits (AJHL) | — |
| 17 | (United States) | Braiden Dorfman | Freshman | F | 6' 1" (1.85 m) | 185 lb (84 kg) | 2000-08-09 | Nashville, Tennessee | Shreveport Mudbugs (NAHL) | — |
| 18 | (United States) | Josh Waters | Sophomore | F | 5' 11" (1.8 m) | 175 lb (79 kg) | 2000-01-23 | Collegeville, Pennsylvania | Maryland Black Bears (NAHL) | — |
| 20 | (United States) | Erik Urbank | Senior | F | 6' 2" (1.88 m) | 195 lb (88 kg) | 1999-03-28 | Orchard Park, New York | Chicago Steel (USHL) | — |
| 21 | (Canada) | Matt Hubbarde | Freshman | F | 6' 1" (1.85 m) | 195 lb (88 kg) | 2000-04-15 | Pickering, Ontario | Langley Rivermen (BCHL) | — |
| 22 | (United States) | Sam Hesler | Senior | F | 6' 1" (1.85 m) | 190 lb (86 kg) | 1998-06-06 | Boxborough, Massachusetts | Wenatchee Wild (BCHL) | — |
| 23 | (United States) | Ian Pierce | Freshman | D | 5' 10" (1.78 m) | 190 lb (86 kg) | 2001-01-24 | Edgewater, New Jersey | Dubuque Fighting Saints (USHL) | — |
| 25 | (Canada) | Nate Morgan | Freshman | F | 5' 10" (1.78 m) | 190 lb (86 kg) | 2002-02-08 | Calgary, Alberta | Salmon Arm Silverbacks (BCHL) | — |
| 26 | (United States) | Jeff Losurdo | Senior | F | 6' 0" (1.83 m) | 185 lb (84 kg) | 1998-03-09 | Elmhurst, Illinois | Jersey Hitmen (NCDC) | — |
| 27 | (Norway) | Trym Løkkeberg | Freshman | F | 6' 2" (1.88 m) | 210 lb (95 kg) | 2001-07-23 | Fredrikstad, Norway | Mora J20 (J20 Nationell) | — |
| 28 | (Canada) | Brady MacDonald | Freshman | D | 6' 4" (1.93 m) | 190 lb (86 kg) | 2000-01-24 | Union, Ontario | Victoria Grizzlies (BCHL) | — |
| 29 | (United States) | Sean Keohan | Junior | D | 5' 11" (1.8 m) | 180 lb (82 kg) | 1999-02-09 | Milton, Massachusetts | Boston Junior Bruins (NCDC) | — |
| 30 | (United States) | Troy Burkhart | Junior | G | 6' 1" (1.85 m) | 170 lb (77 kg) | 2001-03-20 | Tampa, Florida | Henry B. Plant High School (USHS–FL) | — |
| 31 | (United States) | Justin Ferguson | Senior | G | 6' 2" (1.88 m) | 165 lb (75 kg) | 1997-08-06 | Hudson, New Hampshire | Islanders Hockey Club (NCDC) | — |
| 35 | (Canada) | Clay Stevenson | Sophomore | G | 6' 4" (1.93 m) | 195 lb (88 kg) | 1999-03-03 | Port Coquitlam, British Columbia | Coquitlam Express (BCHL) | — |

== Standings ==
2021–22 ECAC Hockey Standings
| | Conference record | | | | | | | | | | Overall record | | | | | |
| | GP | W | L | T | OTW | OTL | 3/SW | PTS | GF | GA | GP | W | L | T | GF | GA |
|---|---|---|---|---|---|---|---|---|---|---|---|---|---|---|---|---|
| #8 Quinnipiac † | 22 | 17 | 4 | 1 | 0 | 1 | 1 | 54 | 71 | 14 | 42 | 32 | 7 | 3 | 139 | 53 |
| #17 Clarkson | 22 | 14 | 4 | 4 | 0 | 2 | 3 | 51 | 86 | 47 | 37 | 21 | 10 | 6 | 123 | 85 |
| #15 Harvard * | 22 | 14 | 6 | 2 | 0 | 0 | 2 | 46 | 69 | 46 | 35 | 21 | 11 | 3 | 116 | 82 |
| Cornell | 22 | 12 | 6 | 4 | 2 | 1 | 0 | 39 | 73 | 47 | 32 | 18 | 10 | 4 | 100 | 72 |
| Colgate | 22 | 9 | 9 | 4 | 1 | 0 | 3 | 33 | 55 | 57 | 40 | 18 | 18 | 4 | 111 | 112 |
| Rensselaer | 22 | 10 | 12 | 0 | 0 | 0 | 0 | 30 | 58 | 63 | 44 | 18 | 23 | 3 | 114 | 119 |
| Union | 22 | 9 | 11 | 2 | 3 | 1 | 0 | 27 | 52 | 66 | 37 | 14 | 19 | 4 | 89 | 110 |
| St. Lawrence | 22 | 7 | 10 | 5 | 2 | 0 | 2 | 26 | 44 | 60 | 37 | 11 | 19 | 7 | 72 | 110 |
| Brown | 22 | 6 | 12 | 4 | 0 | 1 | 2 | 25 | 36 | 61 | 31 | 7 | 20 | 4 | 50 | 100 |
| Princeton | 22 | 7 | 14 | 1 | 0 | 1 | 0 | 23 | 54 | 89 | 31 | 8 | 21 | 2 | 70 | 122 |
| Yale | 22 | 7 | 14 | 1 | 3 | 1 | 1 | 21 | 38 | 60 | 30 | 8 | 21 | 1 | 55 | 90 |
| Dartmouth | 22 | 5 | 15 | 2 | 0 | 3 | 1 | 21 | 45 | 71 | 32 | 7 | 22 | 3 | 69 | 110 |
Championship: March 19, 2022 † indicates conference regular season champion (Cleary Cup) * indicates conference tournament champion (Whitelaw Cup); Rankings: USCHO.com Top 20 Poll

== Schedule and results ==
| Date | Time | Opponent^{#} | Rank^{#} | Site | TV | Decision | Result | Attendance | Record |
Exhibition
| October 16 | 7:00 PM | at #14 Harvard* | | Bright-Landry Hockey Center • Boston, Massachusetts (Exhibition) | | | L 0–4 | | |
| October 23 | 7:00 PM | at #9 Massachusetts* | | Mullins Center • Amherst, Massachusetts (Exhibition) | | | W 3–2 | | |
Regular season
| October 29 | 8:00 PM | #15 Harvard | | Thompson Arena • Hanover, New Hampshire | | Ferguson | L 3–9 | 1,438 | 0–1–0 (0–1–0) |
| October 30 | 6:00 PM | Connecticut* | | Thompson Arena • Hanover, New Hampshire | | Stevenson | L 1–4 | 1,027 | 0–2–0 |
| November 5 | 7:00 PM | Colgate | | Thompson Arena • Hanover, New Hampshire | | Stevenson | W 3–2 | 990 | 1–2–0 (1–1–0) |
| November 6 | 7:00 PM | #15 Cornell | | Thompson Arena • Hanover, New Hampshire | | Ferguson | L 4–5 | 1,432 | 1–3–0 (1–2–0) |
| November 12 | 7:00 PM | at St. Lawrence | | Appleton Arena • Canton, New York | | Ferguson | W 3–2 | 1,774 | 2–3–0 (2–2–0) |
| November 13 | 7:00 PM | at Clarkson | | Cheel Arena • Potsdam, New York | | Ferguson | L 0–3 | 2,620 | 2–4–0 (2–3–0) |
| November 26 | 4:00 PM | at Providence* | | Schneider Arena • Providence, Rhode Island | NESN | Ferguson | L 4–7 | 1,969 | 2–5–0 |
| November 28 | 4:00 PM | Vermont* | | Thompson Arena • Hanover, New Hampshire | NESN+ | Ferguson | L 2–3 | 1,551 | 2–6–0 |
| December 3 | 7:00 PM | at Yale | | Ingalls Rink • New Haven, Connecticut | | Stevenson | L 2–3 | 1,165 | 2–7–0 (2–4–0) |
| December 4 | 7:00 PM | at Brown | | Meehan Auditorium • Providence, Rhode Island | | Stevenson | L 0–4 | 357 | 2–8–0 (2–5–0) |
| December 17 | 7:00 PM | at Merrimack* | | J. Thom Lawler Rink • North Andover, Massachusetts | | Stevenson | T 2–2 | 1,022 | 2–8–1 |
Ledyard Bank Classic
| December 30 | 7:30 PM | New Hampshire* | | Thompson Arena • Hanover, New Hampshire (Ledyard Bank Semifinal); (Rivalry) | NESN | Stevenson | W 3–1 | 178 | 3–8–1 |
| December 31 | 7:30 PM | #20 Boston College* | | Thompson Arena • Hanover, New Hampshire (Ledyard Bank Championship) | | Stevenson | L 1–6 | 48 | 3–9–1 |
| January 16 | 7:00 PM | at #2 Quinnipiac | | People's United Center • Hamden, Connecticut | | Stevenson | L 1–3 | 2,108 | 3–10–1 (2–6–0) |
| January 21 | 7:00 PM | Clarkson | | Thompson Arena • Hanover, New Hampshire | | Ferguson | T 5–5 ^{SOL} | 160 | 3–10–2 (2–6–1) |
| January 22 | 7:00 PM | St. Lawrence | | Thompson Arena • Hanover, New Hampshire | | Ferguson | L 1–3 | 199 | 3–11–2 (2–7–1) |
| January 26 | 7:00 PM | Union | | Thompson Arena • Hanover, New Hampshire | | Ferguson | L 2–3 | 118 | 3–12–2 (2–8–1) |
| January 28 | 7:00 PM | at #8 Cornell | | Lynah Rink • Ithaca, New York | | Ferguson | T 2–2 ^{SOW} | 2,133 | 3–12–3 (2–8–2) |
| January 29 | 7:00 PM | at Colgate | | Class of 1965 Arena • Hamilton, New York | | Ferguson | L 1–2 | 606 | 3–13–3 (2–9–2) |
| February 1 | 6:00 PM | Rensselaer | | Thompson Arena • Hanover, New Hampshire | | Stevenson | L 0–2 | 101 | 3–14–3 (2–10–2) |
| February 4 | 7:00 PM | at Harvard | | Bright-Landry Hockey Center • Boston, Massachusetts | | Stevenson | L 1–3 | 1,310 | 3–15–3 (2–11–2) |
| February 5 | 7:00 PM | at #14 Massachusetts Lowell* | | Tsongas Center • Lowell, Massachusetts | NESN+ | Stevenson | L 3–6 | 4,375 | 3–16–3 |
| February 11 | 8:00 PM | Brown | | Thompson Arena • Hanover, New Hampshire | | Stevenson | L 2–3 ^{OT} | 878 | 3–17–3 (2–12–2) |
| February 12 | 8:00 PM | Yale | | Thompson Arena • Hanover, New Hampshire | | Stevenson | W 2–1 | 1,121 | 4–17–3 (3–12–2) |
| February 14 | 7:00 PM | at Princeton | | Hobey Baker Memorial Rink • Princeton, New Jersey | | Stevenson | W 7–3 | 826 | 5–17–3 (4–12–2) |
| February 18 | 7:00 PM | #4 Quinnipiac | | Thompson Arena • Hanover, New Hampshire | | Stevenson | L 0–5 | 978 | 5–18–3 (4–13–2) |
| February 19 | 7:00 PM | Princeton | | Thompson Arena • Hanover, New Hampshire | | Stevenson | W 2–0 | 1,803 | 6–18–3 (5–13–2) |
| February 25 | 7:00 PM | at Rensselaer | | Houston Field House • Troy, New York | | Stevenson | L 3–6 | 200 | 6–19–3 (5–14–2) |
| February 26 | 7:00 PM | at Union | | Achilles Rink • Schenectady, New York | | Stevenson | L 2–3 | 1,537 | 6–20–3 (5–15–2) |
ECAC Hockey Tournament
| March 4 | 7:00 PM | at Rensselaer* | | Houston Field House • Troy, New York (First Round game 1) | | Stevenson | W 3–2 | 800 | 7–20–3 |
| March 5 | 7:00 PM | at Rensselaer* | | Houston Field House • Troy, New York (First Round game 2) | | Stevenson | L 2–3 | 851 | 7–21–3 |
| March 6 | 7:00 PM | at Rensselaer* | | Houston Field House • Troy, New York (First Round game 3) | | Stevenson | L 3–5 | 579 | 7–22–3 |
Dartmouth Won Series 1–2
*Non-conference game. ^{#}Rankings from USCHO.com Poll. All times are in Eastern Time. Source:

== Scoring statistics ==
| Name | Position | Games | Goals | Assists | Points | PIM |
|---|---|---|---|---|---|---|
| Sean Chisholm | C/LW | 31 | 9 | 14 | 23 | 27 |
| Tanner Palocsik | D | 32 | 4 | 16 | 20 | 10 |
| Mark Gallant | F | 28 | 11 | 7 | 18 | 20 |
| Braiden Dorfman | F | 31 | 8 | 10 | 18 | 34 |
| Ian Pierce | D | 31 | 4 | 10 | 14 | 25 |
| Matt Hubbarde | C | 22 | 6 | 6 | 12 | 4 |
| Joey Musa | F | 31 | 3 | 9 | 12 | 12 |
| Jeff Losurdo | F | 31 | 6 | 5 | 11 | 16 |
| Harrison Markell | D | 32 | 2 | 8 | 10 | 8 |
| Jack Cameron | D | 32 | 3 | 5 | 8 | 31 |
| Sam Hesler | F | 26 | 1 | 7 | 8 | 14 |
| Steven Townley | F | 24 | 4 | 2 | 6 | 4 |
| Ryan Sorkin | F | 28 | 3 | 3 | 6 | 6 |
| Nick Unruh | F | 27 | 1 | 5 | 6 | 4 |
| Dylan Witzke | D | 15 | 0 | 3 | 3 | 2 |
| Josh Waters | F | 12 | 2 | 0 | 2 | 4 |
| Erik Urbank | RW | 23 | 1 | 1 | 2 | 6 |
| Trym Løkkeberg | C | 23 | 0 | 2 | 2 | 6 |
| Tyler Campbell | C | 22 | 1 | 0 | 1 | 4 |
| Nate Morgan | F | 29 | 0 | 1 | 1 | 6 |
| Tyler Borsch | D | 30 | 0 | 1 | 1 | 8 |
| Sean Keohan | D | 30 | 0 | 1 | 1 | 22 |
| Ryan Lovett | F | 6 | 0 | 0 | 0 | 4 |
| Brock Paul | D | 7 | 0 | 0 | 0 | 15 |
| Justin Ferguson | G | 12 | 0 | 0 | 0 | 0 |
| Clay Stevenson | G | 23 | 0 | 0 | 0 | 2 |
| Bench | - | - | - | - | - | 6 |
| Total | | | 69 | 116 | 185 | 300 |

== Goaltending statistics ==
| Name | Games | Minutes | Wins | Losses | Ties | Goals against | Saves | Shut outs | SV % | GAA |
|---|---|---|---|---|---|---|---|---|---|---|
| Clay Stevenson | 23 | 1333 | 6 | 14 | 2 | 60 | 709 | 2 | .922 | 2.70 |
| Justin Ferguson | 12 | 573 | 1 | 8 | 1 | 38 | 258 | 0 | .872 | 3.98 |
| Empty Net | - | 13 | - | - | - | 12 | - | - | - | - |
| Total | 32 | 1920 | 7 | 22 | 3 | 110 | 967 | 2 | .903 | 3.25 |

== Rankings ==
| Poll | Week | | | | | | | | | | | | | | | | | | | | | | | | | |
| Poll | Pre | 1 | 2 | 3 | 4 | 5 | 6 | 7 | 8 | 9 | 10 | 11 | 12 | 13 | 14 | 15 | 16 | 17 | 18 | 19 | 20 | 21 | 22 | 23 | 24 | 25 (Final) |
|---|---|---|---|---|---|---|---|---|---|---|---|---|---|---|---|---|---|---|---|---|---|---|---|---|---|---|
| USCHO.com | NR | NR | NR | NR | NR | NR | NR | NR | NR | NR | NR | NR | NR | NR | NR | NR | NR | NR | NR | NR | NR | NR | NR | NR | - | NR |
| USA Today | NR | NR | NR | NR | NR | NR | NR | NR | NR | NR | NR | NR | NR | NR | NR | NR | NR | NR | NR | NR | NR | NR | NR | NR | NR | NR |

Note: USCHO did not release a poll in week 24.

== Awards and honors ==
| Player | Award | Ref |
|---|---|---|
| Clay Stevenson | ECAC Hockey Third Team | |
| Clay Stevenson | ECAC Hockey Rookie Team | |
