= 2021–22 Yale Bulldogs men's ice hockey season =

College ice hockey season

- Conference: T–11th ECAC Hockey
- Home ice: Ingalls Rink

Rankings
- USCHO: NR
- USA Today: NR

Record
- Overall: 8–21–1
- Conference: 7–14–1
- Home: 5–6–1
- Road: 3–12–0
- Neutral: 0–3–0

Coaches and captains
- Head coach: Keith Allain
- Assistant coaches: Joe Howe; Rob O'Gara; Bill Maniscalco
- Captain: Graham Lillibridge

The 2021–22 Yale Bulldogs Men's ice hockey season was the 126th season of play for the program and the 60th season in the ECAC Hockey conference. The Bulldogs represented Yale University and were coached by Keith Allain, in his 15th season.

== Season ==
After ending an unbroken string of 125 years of varsity hockey, Yale returned to the ice after the COVID-19 pandemic.

Yale lost each of their first six games.

The team played in two in-season tournaments during the year, finishing last in both. The Bulldogs also ended up last in the ECAC Hockey standings and finished the year season with the second-worst PairWise ranking. Despite their lack of success, Yale did give Colgate a close game in the postseason, pushing the first game into overtime.

== Departures ==
Player	Position	Nationality	Cause
Brett Jewell	Forward	Canada	Graduation (retired)
Nick MacNab	Goaltender	United States	Graduation (retired)
Eddie Massaro	Goaltender	United States	Graduation (retired)
Brian Matthews	Defenseman	United States	Graduation (retired)
Kevin O'Neil	Forward	United States	Graduate transfer to Connecticut
Dante Palecco	Forward	United States	Graduate transfer to Sacred Heart
Tyler Welsh	Forward	Canada	Graduate transfer to Long Island

== Recruiting ==
Player	Position	Nationality	Age	Notes
Ryan Carmichael	Forward/Defenseman	United States	22	Greenwich, CT; transfer from Notre Dame
Will Dineen	Forward	United States	20	Hinsdale, IL
Briggs Gammill	Forward	United States	20	New Canaan, CT
Dylan Herzog	Defenseman	United States	20	Auburn, WA
Kieran O'Hearn	Defenseman	Canada	21	North Delta, BC
Luke Pearson	Goaltender	Canada	20	Whitby, ON
Connor Sullivan	Defenseman	United States	21	Plymouth, MA

== Roster ==
As of August 19, 2021.

No.	Nat.	Player	Class	Pos	Height	Weight	DoB	Hometown	Previous team	NHL rights
1	(United States)	Connor Hopkins	Junior	G	6' 1" (1.85 m)	185 lb (84 kg)	2000-03-09	Malden, Massachusetts	Tri-City Storm (USHL)	—
3	(United States)	Michael Young	Junior	D	6' 1" (1.85 m)	210 lb (95 kg)	1998-08-21	Medford, Massachusetts	Vernon Vipers (BCHL)	—
5	(United States)	Dylan Herzog	Freshman	D	6' 1" (1.85 m)	200 lb (91 kg)	2001-01-09	Auburn, Washington	Dubuque Fighting Saints (USHL)	—
6	(United States)	Connor Sullivan	Freshman	D	5' 11" (1.8 m)	180 lb (82 kg)	2000-09-07	Plymouth, Massachusetts	Islanders Hockey Club (NCDC)	—
7	(United States)	Brandon Tabakin	Junior	D	5' 10" (1.78 m)	160 lb (73 kg)	2000-05-21	Woodbury, New York	Sioux Falls Stampede (USHL)	—
8	(Canada)	Ryan Conroy	Sophomore	D	5' 9" (1.75 m)	175 lb (79 kg)	2001-02-06	Chestermere, Alberta	Omaha Lancers (USHL)	—
9	(United States)	Henry Wagner	Sophomore	F	5' 9" (1.75 m)	170 lb (77 kg)	2001-05-11	St. Louis, Missouri	Connecticut Jr. Rangers (NCDC)	—
10	(United States)	Reilly Connors	Sophomore	F	6' 1" (1.85 m)	190 lb (86 kg)	2000-03-17	Madison, Connecticut	Connecticut Jr. Rangers (NCDC)	—
11	(United States)	Niklas Allain	Sophomore	F	6' 2" (1.88 m)	180 lb (82 kg)	1999-09-08	North Branford, Connecticut	Boston Junior Bruins (NCDC)	—
13	(United States)	Ryan Carmichael	Junior	D	6' 2" (1.88 m)	200 lb (91 kg)	1999-03-03	Greenwich, Connecticut	Notre Dame (Big Ten)	—
14	(United States)	Ryan Stevens	Sophomore	F	6' 0" (1.83 m)	185 lb (84 kg)	2000-03-04	Duxbury, Massachusetts	South Shore Kings (NCDC)	—
15	(Canada)	Kyle Johnson	Senior	F	5' 11" (1.8 m)	186 lb (84 kg)	1998-06-03	Port Moody, British Columbia	Prince George Spruce Kings (BCHL)	—
16	(United States)	Teddy Wooding	Junior	F	6' 0" (1.83 m)	180 lb (82 kg)	1999-12-30	Wrentham, Massachusetts	Vernon Vipers (BCHL)	—
17	(United States)	William Dineen	Freshman	F	6' 2" (1.88 m)	195 lb (88 kg)	2000-11-17	Lake George, New York	Sioux Falls Stampede (USHL)	—
18	(United States)	Justin Pearson	Senior	F	6' 1" (1.85 m)	185 lb (84 kg)	1998-05-17	Nashua, New Hampshire	Islanders Hockey Club (NCDC)	—
19	(Canada)	Quinton Ong	Junior	F	5' 10" (1.78 m)	170 lb (77 kg)	1999-07-23	Saskatoon, Saskatchewan	Canmore Eagles (AJHL)	—
21	(United States)	Briggs Gammill	Freshman	F	5' 10" (1.78 m)	175 lb (79 kg)	2001-05-09	New Canaan, Connecticut	Connecticut Jr. Rangers (NCDC)	—
22	(United States)	Hayden Rowan	Junior	F	5' 9" (1.75 m)	175 lb (79 kg)	1999-01-22	Pemberville, Ohio	Trail Smoke Eaters (BCHL)	—
23	(United States)	Cole Donhauser	Junior	F	5' 11" (1.8 m)	180 lb (82 kg)	1999-12-27	Buffalo, New York	Chilliwack Chiefs (BCHL)	—
24	(United States)	Graham Lillibridge (C)	Senior	D	5' 9" (1.75 m)	160 lb (73 kg)	1999-01-29	Geneva, Illinois	Chicago Steel (USHL)	—
25	(Canada)	Kieran O'Hearn	Freshman	D	6' 3" (1.91 m)	200 lb (91 kg)	2000-05-13	North Delta, British Columbia	Surrey Eagles (BCHL)	—
27	(United States)	Ian Carpentier	Sophomore	F	6' 0" (1.83 m)	175 lb (79 kg)	2000-06-22	Worcester, Massachusetts	Boston Junior Bruins (NCDC)	—
30	(Canada)	Luke Pearson	Freshman	G	6' 2" (1.88 m)	185 lb (84 kg)	2001-01-29	Whitby, Ontario	Alberni Valley Bulldogs (BCHL)	—
47	(United States)	Nathan Reid	Sophomore	G	6' 2" (1.88 m)	195 lb (88 kg)	2000-07-12	Madison, Wisconsin	Muskegon Lumberjacks (USHL)	—

== Standings ==
2021–22 ECAC Hockey Standings
	Conference record										Overall record					
	GP	W	L	T	OTW	OTL	3/SW	PTS	GF	GA	GP	W	L	T	GF	GA
#8 Quinnipiac †	22	17	4	1	0	1	1	54	71	14	42	32	7	3	139	53
#17 Clarkson	22	14	4	4	0	2	3	51	86	47	37	21	10	6	123	85
#15 Harvard *	22	14	6	2	0	0	2	46	69	46	35	21	11	3	116	82
Cornell	22	12	6	4	2	1	0	39	73	47	32	18	10	4	100	72
Colgate	22	9	9	4	1	0	3	33	55	57	40	18	18	4	111	112
Rensselaer	22	10	12	0	0	0	0	30	58	63	44	18	23	3	114	119
Union	22	9	11	2	3	1	0	27	52	66	37	14	19	4	89	110
St. Lawrence	22	7	10	5	2	0	2	26	44	60	37	11	19	7	72	110
Brown	22	6	12	4	0	1	2	25	36	61	31	7	20	4	50	100
Princeton	22	7	14	1	0	1	0	23	54	89	31	8	21	2	70	122
Yale	22	7	14	1	3	1	1	21	38	60	30	8	21	1	55	90
Dartmouth	22	5	15	2	0	3	1	21	45	71	32	7	22	3	69	110
Championship: March 19, 2022 † indicates conference regular season champion (Cleary Cup) * indicates conference tournament champion (Whitelaw Cup); Rankings: USCHO.com Top 20 Poll

== Schedule and results ==
Date	Time	Opponent^{#}	Rank^{#}	Site	TV	Decision	Result	Attendance	Record
Regular season
October 30	7:00 PM	at Brown		Meehan Auditorium • Providence, Rhode Island		Pearson	L 0–2	743	0–1–0 (0–1–0)
November 5	7:00 PM	#6 Quinnipiac		Ingalls Rink • New Haven, Connecticut		Reid	L 0–3	1,200	0–2–0 (0–2–0)
November 6	7:00 PM	Princeton		Ingalls Rink • New Haven, Connecticut		Reid	L 2–6	1,347	0–3–0 (0–3–0)
November 12	7:05 PM	at Army*		Tate Rink • West Point, New York		Hopkins	L 3–6	1,989	0–4–0
November 19	7:00 PM	at Colgate		Class of 1965 Arena • Hamilton, New York		Hopkins	L 0–3	628	0–5–0 (0–3–0)
November 20	7:30 PM	at #10 Cornell		Lynah Rink • Ithaca, New York		Pearson	L 0–3	3,448	0–6–0 (0–4–0)
November 24	7:00 PM	Vermont*		Ingalls Rink • New Haven, Connecticut		Reid	W 4–2	1,100	1–6–0
December 3	7:00 PM	Dartmouth		Ingalls Rink • New Haven, Connecticut		Reid	W 3–2	1,165	2–6–0 (1–4–0)
December 4	7:00 PM	#17 Harvard		Ingalls Rink • New Haven, Connecticut (Rivalry)		Hopkins	L 3–5	1,636	2–7–0 (1–5–0)
December 10	7:00 PM	Brown		Ingalls Rink • New Haven, Connecticut		Reid	W 4–3	1,127	3–7–0 (2–5–0)
Holiday Face–Off
December 28	8:37 PM	vs. Wisconsin*		Fiserv Forum • Milwaukee, Wisconsin (Face–Off Semifinal)	BSW	Reid	L 2–3 ^{OT}	6,533	3–8–0
December 29	5:07 PM	vs. Bowling Green*		Fiserv Forum • Milwaukee, Wisconsin (Face–Off Consolation Game)	BSN, BSO, BSW	Hopkins	L 1–2	-	3–9–0
January 15	7:00 PM	#9 Cornell		Ingalls Rink • New Haven, Connecticut		Hopkins	L 0–3	-	3–10–0 (2–7–0)
January 16	7:00 PM	Colgate		Ingalls Rink • New Haven, Connecticut		Reid	T 2–2 ^{SOW}	0	3–10–1 (2–7–1)
January 21	7:00 PM	at Rensselaer		Houston Field House • Troy, New York		Reid	W 5–3	0	4–10–1 (3–7–1)
January 22	7:00 PM	at Union		Achilles Rink • Schenectady, New York		Pearson	W 3–2 ^{OT}	1,572	5–10–1 (4–7–1)
Connecticut Ice
January 29	3:30 PM	vs. Connecticut*		Webster Bank Arena • Bridgeport, Connecticut (Connecticut Ice semifinal)	SNY	Pearson	L 1–5	0	5–11–1
January 30	1:00 PM	at Sacred Heart*		Webster Bank Arena • Bridgeport, Connecticut (Connecticut Ice consolation game)	SNY	Reid	L 3–4 ^{OT}	0	5–12–1
February 4	7:00 PM	St. Lawrence		Ingalls Rink • New Haven, Connecticut		Reid	L 1–2 ^{OT}	0	5–13–1 (4–8–1)
February 5	7:00 PM	#20 Clarkson		Ingalls Rink • New Haven, Connecticut		Reid	L 2–3	0	5–14–1 (4–9–1)
February 8	7:00 PM	at Princeton		Hobey Baker Memorial Rink • Princeton, New Jersey		Pearson	L 1–2	1,175	5–15–1 (4–10–1)
February 11	8:00 PM	at Harvard		Bright-Landry Hockey Center • Boston, Massachusetts (Rivalry)		Reid	L 0–2	2,447	5–16–1 (4–11–1)
February 12	7:00 PM	at Dartmouth		Thompson Arena • Hanover, New Hampshire		Pearson	L 0–1	1,121	5–17–1 (4–12–1)
February 18	7:00 PM	Union		Ingalls Rink • New Haven, Connecticut		Reid	W 3–2	903	6–17–1 (5–12–1)
February 19	7:00 PM	Rensselaer		Ingalls Rink • New Haven, Connecticut		Reid	W 5–2	984	7–17–1 (6–12–1)
February 22	7:00 PM	at #5 Quinnipiac		People's United Center • Hamden, Connecticut		Reid	L 0–4	3,625	7–18–1 (6–13–1)
February 25	7:00 PM	at #17 Clarkson		Cheel Arena • Potsdam, New York		Pearson	W 3–2 ^{OT}	2,300	8–18–1 (7–13–1)
February 26	7:00 PM	at St. Lawrence		Appleton Arena • Canton, New York		Pearson	L 1–3	1,236	8–19–1 (7–14–1)
ECAC Hockey Tournament
March 4	7:00 PM	at Colgate*		Class of 1965 Arena • Hamilton, New York (First Round game 1)		Reid	L 2–3 ^{OT}	1,002	8–20–1
March 5	7:00 PM	at Colgate*		Class of 1965 Arena • Hamilton, New York (First Round game 1)		Reid	L 1–5	848	8–21–1
Yale Won Series 0–2
*Non-conference game. ^{#}Rankings from USCHO.com Poll. All times are in Eastern Time. Source:

== Scoring statistics ==
Name	Position	Games	Goals	Assists	Points	PIM
Ian Carpentier	C	26	8	5	13	23
Cole Donhauser	F	30	4	8	12	43
Briggs Gammill	F	27	3	9	12	18
Nik Allain	F	28	4	7	11	73
Justin Pearson	F	30	3	8	11	24
Teddy Wooding	F	24	6	4	10	2
Will Dineen	F	22	5	4	9	21
Reilly Connors	F	30	4	5	9	33
Graham Lillibridge	D	30	4	4	8	4
Henry Wagner	LW	24	3	5	8	8
Dylan Herzog	D	23	2	6	8	4
Kieran O'Hearn	D	29	2	4	6	33
Ryan Carmichael	D/F	28	1	3	4	6
Michael Young	D	28	1	3	4	8
Kyle Johnson	F	30	2	1	3	19
Quinton Ong	RW	17	1	2	3	4
Brandon Tabakin	D	28	1	2	3	4
Connor Sullivan	D	28	0	3	3	10
Ryan Conroy	D	29	0	3	3	14
Ryan Stevens	F	19	1	1	2	2
Hayden Rowan	LW	17	0	1	1	0
Connor Hopkins	G	5	0	0	0	0
Luke Pearson	G	9	0	0	0	0
Nathan Reid	G	18	0	0	0	2
Bench	-	-	-	-	-	6
Total			55	88	143	351

== Goaltending statistics ==
Name	Games	Minutes	Wins	Losses	Ties	Goals against	Saves	Shut outs	SV %	GAA
Luke Pearson	10	521	2	6	0	21	229	0	.916	2.42
Nathan Reid	18	1087	6	10	1	49	445	0	.901	2.71
Connor Hopkins	5	217	0	5	0	15	100	0	.870	4.14
Empty Net	-	5	-	-	-	2	-	-	-	-
Total	30	1830	8	21	1	87	774	0	.900	2.82

== Rankings ==
Poll	Week																									
Poll	Pre	1	2	3	4	5	6	7	8	9	10	11	12	13	14	15	16	17	18	19	20	21	22	23	24	25 (Final)
USCHO.com	NR	NR	NR	NR	NR	NR	NR	NR	NR	NR	NR	NR	NR	NR	NR	NR	NR	NR	NR	NR	NR	NR	NR	NR	-	NR
USA Today	NR	NR	NR	NR	NR	NR	NR	NR	NR	NR	NR	NR	NR	NR	NR	NR	NR	NR	NR	NR	NR	NR	NR	NR	NR	NR

Note: USCHO did not release a poll in week 24.
