= 2021–22 Princeton Tigers men's ice hockey season =

- Conference: 10th ECAC Hockey
- Home ice: Hobey Baker Memorial Rink

Rankings
- USCHO: NR
- USA Today: NR

Record
- Overall: 8–21–2
- Conference: 7–14–1
- Home: 3–10–1
- Road: 5–11–1

Coaches and captains
- Head coach: Ron Fogarty
- Assistant coaches: Brad Dexter; Tommy Davis
- Captain: Matthew Thom
- Alternate captain: Luke Keenan

The 2021–22 Princeton Tigers Men's ice hockey season was the 119th season of play for the program and the 60th season in the ECAC Hockey conference. The Tigers represented the Princeton University and played their home games at the Hobey Baker Memorial Rink, and were coached by Ron Fogarty, in his 7th season.

== Season ==
After losing all of their previous season to the COVID-19 pandemic, Princeton started the year well, posting a winning record through their third week. Afterwards, the team's goaltending faltered and the Tigers lost nine consecutive games, dropping them to the bottom of the conference standings.

Around Christmas, Princeton was one of several teams affected by an uptick in COVID positives that forced the team to postpone several games until later in the season. At one point, Princeton was prepared to use Rachel McQuigge, the starting goalie for the women's team, as a backup but the game in question was delayed and the idea was never put into practice. The delay did allow the team to refocus for the second half of the season and the Tigers reeled off several wins to climb up into the middle of the ECAC pack.

Senior Jérémie Forget took command of the Princeton crease by February, however, an injury knocked him out for the remainder of the regular season. Aidan Porter was installed in goal for the six games that had been shoehorned into the final two weeks and Princeton ended up losing each match. While the defense wasn't able to keep the puck out of the net, the offense had also regressed, getting shut out in three of those games.

Princeton got its starting goalie back in time for the postseason, but Forget had little time to get back into the swing of things. The Tigers allowed Union to shell their net, allowing 37 shots against in both games. Forget held the fort in the first contest, allowing 3 goals, but the offense remained diminished and Princeton was swept out of the playoffs.

== Departures ==
Player	Position	Nationality	Cause
Neil Doef	Forward	Canada	Graduation (retired)
Ryan Ferland	Goaltender	United States	Graduation (retired)
Jacob Paganelli	Forward	United States	Graduation (retired)
Sami Pharaon	Defenseman	Finland	Left mid-season (signed with TUTO Hockey)
Colin Tonge	Forward	Canada	Graduation (retired)
Reid Yochim	Defenseman	Canada	Graduation (signed with Grästorps IK)

== Recruiting ==
Player	Position	Nationality	Age	Notes
Jack Cronin	Forward	United States	20	Hamilton, MA
Noah de la Durantaye	Defenseman	Canada	21	Beaconsfield, QC
Alex Konovalov	Forward	United States	20	Summit, NJ
David Ma	Defenseman	United States	19	Manhattan, NY
Ethan Pearson	Goaltender	Canada	19	Fredericton, NB

== Roster ==
As of August 19, 2021.

No.	Nat.	Player	Class	Pos	Height	Weight	DoB	Hometown	Previous team	NHL rights
1	(Canada)	Jérémie Forget	Senior	G	6' 1" (1.85 m)	185 lb (84 kg)	1997-10-15	Mascouche, Quebec	Carleton Place Canadians (CCHL)	—
2	(United States)	Mike Ufberg	Senior	D	5' 9" (1.75 m)	180 lb (82 kg)	1997-09-24	Richboro, Pennsylvania	Vernon Vipers (BCHL)	—
3	(United States)	Mike Kennedy	Sophomore	D	6' 1" (1.85 m)	190 lb (86 kg)	2000-07-17	Holyoke, Massachusetts	Nanaimo Clippers (BCHL)	—
4	(United States)	David Ma	Freshman	D	5' 11" (1.8 m)	180 lb (82 kg)	2002-06-22	Yonkers, New York	Chicago Steel (USHL)	—
5	(Canada)	Mark Paolini	Senior	D	6' 0" (1.83 m)	180 lb (82 kg)	1998-03-06	Toronto, Ontario	St. Michael's Buzzers (OJHL)	—
6	(Canada)	Matt Kellenberger	Senior	D	6' 1" (1.85 m)	185 lb (84 kg)	1999-01-11	Toronto, Ontario	Oakville Blades (OJHL)	—
7	(United States)	Nick Carabin	Sophomore	D	5' 10" (1.78 m)	175 lb (79 kg)	2000-04-30	Mahwah, New Jersey	Coquitlam Express (BCHL)	—
8	(Canada)	Sami Pharaon	Senior	D	5' 10" (1.78 m)	170 lb (77 kg)	1999-05-28	North Vancouver, British Columbia	Alberni Valley Bulldogs (BCHL)	—
9	(Canada)	MacKenzie Merriman	Sophomore	F	5' 11" (1.8 m)	190 lb (86 kg)	2000-04-14	White Rock, British Columbia	Nanaimo Clippers (BCHL)	—
10	(United States)	Alex Konovalov	Freshman	F	5' 10" (1.78 m)	180 lb (82 kg)	2000-11-12	Basking Ridge, New Jersey	Lone Star Brahmas (NAHL)	—
12	(United States)	Ian Murphy	Sophomore	F	5' 11" (1.8 m)	176 lb (80 kg)	1999-04-06	Scituate, Massachusetts	Tri-City Storm (USHL)	—
13	(United States)	Nick Seitz	Sophomore	F	5' 11" (1.8 m)	176 lb (80 kg)	1999-04-06	Scituate, Massachusetts	Tri-City Storm (USHL)	—
14	(United States)	Liam Gorman	Junior	F	6' 3" (1.91 m)	197 lb (89 kg)	2000-05-08	Arlington, Massachusetts	Saint Sebastian's School (USHS–MA)	PIT, 177th overall 2018
15	(Canada)	Spencer Kersten	Junior	F	5' 10" (1.78 m)	185 lb (84 kg)	2000-05-16	Waterloo, Ontario	Oakville Blades (OJHL)	—
16	(Canada)	Finn Evans	Senior	F	6' 4" (1.93 m)	185 lb (84 kg)	1999-08-21	Toronto, Ontario	Ottawa Jr. Senators (CCHL)	—
17	(United States)	Adam Robbins	Sophomore	F	5' 8" (1.73 m)	155 lb (70 kg)	2000-04-12	New York, New York	Chicago Steel (USHL)	—
18	(Canada)	Matt Hayami	Junior	F	5' 10" (1.78 m)	185 lb (84 kg)	2000-05-21	Oakville, Ontario	Markham Royals (OJHL)	—
19	(United States)	Jack Cronin	Freshman	F	5' 11" (1.8 m)	185 lb (84 kg)	2001-03-31	South Hamilton, Massachusetts	Minnesota Magicians (NAHL)	—
20	(United States)	Christian O'Neill	Senior	F	5' 11" (1.8 m)	175 lb (79 kg)	1998-06-17	Westwood, Massachusetts	Omaha Lancers (USHL)	—
21	(United States)	Pito Walton	Junior	D	6' 2" (1.88 m)	192 lb (87 kg)	2000-03-17	Peapack, New Jersey	Coquitlam Express (BCHL)	—
22	(Canada)	Noah de la Durantaye	Freshman	D	6' 1" (1.85 m)	205 lb (93 kg)	2000-05-27	Montreal, Quebec	Coquitlam Express (BCHL)	—
23	(United States)	Joe Berg	Sophomore	F	5' 11" (1.8 m)	185 lb (84 kg)	1999-10-07	Plano, Texas	Tri-City Storm (USHL)	—
24	(Canada)	Matthew Thom (C)	Senior	D	6' 3" (1.91 m)	200 lb (91 kg)	1998-05-18	Oakville, Ontario	Georgetown Raiders (OJHL)	—
25	(Canada)	Luke Keenan (A)	Senior	F	6' 1" (1.85 m)	196 lb (89 kg)	1998-07-22	Courtice, Ontario	Whitby Fury (OJHL)	—
27	(Canada)	Corey Andonovski	Senior	F	6' 1" (1.85 m)	195 lb (88 kg)	1999-03-26	Uxbridge, Ontario	Chilliwack Chiefs (BCHL)	—
31	(United States)	Ethan Pearson	Freshman	G	6' 2" (1.88 m)	190 lb (86 kg)	2002-07-30	Fredericton, New Brunswick	Mount Saint Charles Academy (Midget AAA)	—
35	(United States)	Aidan Porter	Junior	G	6' 2" (1.88 m)	180 lb (82 kg)	1999-05-18	Weston, Massachusetts	Vernon Vipers (BCHL)	—

== Standings ==
2021–22 ECAC Hockey Standings
	Conference record										Overall record					
	GP	W	L	T	OTW	OTL	3/SW	PTS	GF	GA	GP	W	L	T	GF	GA
#8 Quinnipiac †	22	17	4	1	0	1	1	54	71	14	42	32	7	3	139	53
#17 Clarkson	22	14	4	4	0	2	3	51	86	47	37	21	10	6	123	85
#15 Harvard *	22	14	6	2	0	0	2	46	69	46	35	21	11	3	116	82
Cornell	22	12	6	4	2	1	0	39	73	47	32	18	10	4	100	72
Colgate	22	9	9	4	1	0	3	33	55	57	40	18	18	4	111	112
Rensselaer	22	10	12	0	0	0	0	30	58	63	44	18	23	3	114	119
Union	22	9	11	2	3	1	0	27	52	66	37	14	19	4	89	110
St. Lawrence	22	7	10	5	2	0	2	26	44	60	37	11	19	7	72	110
Brown	22	6	12	4	0	1	2	25	36	61	31	7	20	4	50	100
Princeton	22	7	14	1	0	1	0	23	54	89	31	8	21	2	70	122
Yale	22	7	14	1	3	1	1	21	38	60	30	8	21	1	55	90
Dartmouth	22	5	15	2	0	3	1	21	45	71	32	7	22	3	69	110
Championship: March 19, 2022 † indicates conference regular season champion (Cleary Cup) * indicates conference tournament champion (Whitelaw Cup); Rankings: USCHO.com Top 20 Poll

== Schedule and results ==
Date	Time	Opponent^{#}	Rank^{#}	Site	TV	Decision	Result	Attendance	Record
Exhibition
October 16	7:00 PM	at #15 Cornell*		Lynah Rink • Ithaca, New York (Exhibition)			L 0–5		
Regular season
October 30	4:05 PM	at Army*		Tate Rink • West Point, New York		Forget	L 1–4	1,391	0–1–0
November 5	7:00 PM	at Brown		Meehan Auditorium • Providence, Rhode Island		Porter	W 6–3	427	1–1–0 (1–0–0)
November 6	7:00 PM	at Yale		Ingalls Rink • New Haven, Connecticut		Forget	W 6–2	1,347	2–1–0 (2–0–0)
November 12	3:00 PM	at Long Island*		Northwell Health Ice Center • East Meadow, New York		Porter	W 2–1	134	3–1–0
November 13	4:00 PM	Long Island*		Hobey Baker Memorial Rink • Princeton, New Jersey		Forget	T 4–4 ^{OT}	1,288	3–1–1
November 19	7:00 PM	St. Lawrence		Hobey Baker Memorial Rink • Princeton, New Jersey		Porter	L 4–6	1,265	3–2–1 (2–1–0)
November 20	7:00 PM	Clarkson		Hobey Baker Memorial Rink • Princeton, New Jersey		Forget	L 3–8	1,451	3–3–1 (2–2–0)
November 26	7:00 PM	RIT*		Hobey Baker Memorial Rink • Princeton, New Jersey		Pearson	L 4–5	1,200	3–4–1
November 27	7:00 PM	RIT*		Hobey Baker Memorial Rink • Princeton, New Jersey		Porter	L 0–1	1,205	3–5–1
December 3	7:00 PM	at Union		Achilles Rink • Schenectady, New York		Porter	L 0–1 ^{OT}	1,250	3–6–1 (2–3–0)
December 4	7:00 PM	at Rensselaer		Houston Field House • Troy, New York		Porter	L 1–4	297	3–7–1 (2–4–0)
December 10	7:00 PM	at #16 Providence*		Schneider Arena • Providence, Rhode Island	NESN+	Porter	L 0–7	2,129	3–8–1
December 11	7:00 PM	at #16 Providence*		Schneider Arena • Providence, Rhode Island		Forget	L 2–3	1,920	3–9–1
January 18	4:00 PM	at #1 Quinnipiac		People's United Center • Hamden, Connecticut		Pearson	L 0–9	1,897	3–10–1 (2–5–0)
January 21	7:00 PM	at #8 Cornell		Lynah Rink • Ithaca, New York		Forget	W 5–4	2,133	4–10–1 (3–5–0)
January 22	7:00 PM	at Colgate		Class of 1965 Arena • Hamilton, New York		Forget	T 2–2 ^{SOL}	0	4–10–2 (3–5–1)
January 26	7:00 PM	#2 Quinnipiac		Hobey Baker Memorial Rink • Princeton, New Jersey		Forget	L 0–6	0	4–11–2 (3–6–1)
January 28	7:00 PM	Brown		Hobey Baker Memorial Rink • Princeton, New Jersey		Forget	W 6–1	0	5–11–2 (4–6–1)
February 4	7:00 PM	Rensselaer		Hobey Baker Memorial Rink • Princeton, New Jersey		Forget	W 3–2	1,141	6–11–2 (5–6–1)
February 5	7:00 PM	Union		Hobey Baker Memorial Rink • Princeton, New Jersey		Forget	L 3–7	1,256	6–12–2 (5–7–1)
February 8	7:00 PM	Yale		Hobey Baker Memorial Rink • Princeton, New Jersey		Forget	W 2–1	1,175	7–12–2 (6–7–1)
February 11	7:00 PM	at #19 Clarkson		Cheel Arena • Potsdam, New York		Porter	L 1–7	2,339	7–13–2 (6–8–1)
February 12	7:00 PM	at St. Lawrence		Appleton Arena • Canton, New York		Forget	W 3–2	773	8–13–2 (7–8–1)
February 14	7:00 PM	Dartmouth		Hobey Baker Memorial Rink • Princeton, New Jersey		Porter	L 3–7	826	8–14–2 (7–9–1)
February 18	7:00 PM	at Harvard		Bright-Landry Hockey Center • Boston, Massachusetts		Porter	L 3–4	1,335	8–15–2 (7–10–1)
February 19	7:00 PM	at Dartmouth		Thompson Arena • Hanover, New Hampshire		Porter	L 0–2	1,803	8–16–2 (7–11–1)
February 25	7:00 PM	Colgate		Hobey Baker Memorial Rink • Princeton, New Jersey		Porter	L 3–4	1,151	8–17–2 (7–12–1)
February 26	7:00 PM	#18 Cornell		Hobey Baker Memorial Rink • Princeton, New Jersey		Porter	L 0–4	2,035	8–18–2 (7–13–1)
February 27	7:00 PM	Harvard		Hobey Baker Memorial Rink • Princeton, New Jersey		Porter	L 0–3	1,889	8–19–2 (7–14–1)
ECAC Hockey Tournament
March 4	7:00 PM	at Union*		Achilles Rink • Schenectady, New York (First Round game 1)		Forget	L 2–3	1,473	8–20–2
March 5	7:00 PM	at Union*		Achilles Rink • Schenectady, New York (First Round game 2)		Forget	L 1–5	1,435	8–21–2
Princeton Lost Series 0–2
*Non-conference game. ^{#}Rankings from USCHO.com Poll. All times are in Eastern Time. Source:

== Scoring statistics ==
Name	Position	Games	Goals	Assists	Points	PIM
Corey Andonovski	RW	31	10	12	22	34
Ian Murphy	F	25	9	10	19	42
Spencer Kersten	RW	31	6	10	16	14
Adam Robbins	F	31	5	8	13	2
Christian O'Neill	C	30	2	10	12	27
Pito Walton	D	31	4	7	11	18
Mark Paolini	D	29	2	9	11	16
Finn Evans	RW	24	6	4	10	15
Noah de la Durantaye	D	28	3	7	10	8
Nick Seitz	F	31	3	6	9	14
David Ma	D	18	2	5	7	14
Matthew Kellenberger	D	25	4	2	6	16
Liam Gorman	C	28	3	3	6	16
Jack Cronin	C	23	2	4	6	12
Luke Keenan	D	31	2	4	6	12
Matthew Thom	D	26	1	5	6	10
MacKenzie Merriman	F	26	2	3	5	6
Alex Konovalov	F	22	0	4	4	6
Mike Kennedy	D	18	2	1	3	6
Michael Ufberg	D	20	1	2	3	4
Joe Berg	F	28	1	1	2	13
Nicholas Carabin	D	21	0	1	1	12
Sami Pharaon	D	2	0	0	0	2
Ethan Pearson	G	4	0	0	0	0
Matthew Hayami	C	7	0	0	0	4
Jérémie Forget	G	17	0	0	0	0
Aidan Porter	G	17	0	0	0	0
Bench	-	31	-	-	-	6
Total			70	118	188	327

== Goaltending statistics ==
Name	Games	Minutes	Wins	Losses	Ties	Goals against	Saves	Shut outs	SV %	GAA
Jérémie Forget	17	945	6	8	2	55	434	0	.888	3.49
Aidan Porter	17	808	2	11	0	50	355	0	.877	3.71
Ethan Pearson	4	100	0	2	0	12	57	0	.826	7.16
Empty Net	-	18	-	-	-	5	-	-	-	-
Total	31	1873	8	21	2	122	846	0	.874	3.91

== Rankings ==
Poll	Week																									
Poll	Pre	1	2	3	4	5	6	7	8	9	10	11	12	13	14	15	16	17	18	19	20	21	22	23	24	25 (Final)
USCHO.com	NR	NR	NR	NR	NR	NR	NR	NR	NR	NR	NR	NR	NR	NR	NR	NR	NR	NR	NR	NR	NR	NR	NR	NR	-	NR
USA Today	NR	NR	NR	NR	NR	NR	NR	NR	NR	NR	NR	NR	NR	NR	NR	NR	NR	NR	NR	NR	NR	NR	NR	NR	NR	NR

Note: USCHO did not release a poll in week 24.

== Players drafted into the NHL ==
=== 2022 NHL entry draft ===
Round	Pick	Player	NHL team
3	76	Michael Fisher^{†}	San Jose Sharks

† incoming freshman
