= 2021–22 Union Dutchmen ice hockey season =

- Conference: 7th ECAC Hockey
- Home ice: Achilles Center

Rankings
- USCHO: NR
- USA Today: NR

Record
- Overall: 14–19–4
- Conference: 9–11–2
- Home: 8–6–2
- Road: 5–13–1
- Neutral: 1–0–0

Coaches and captains
- Head coach: Rick Bennett (resigned); John Ronan (interim)
- Assistant coaches: T. J. Manastersky
- Captain: Josh Kosack
- Alternate captain(s): Dylan Anhorn; Gabriel Seger

The 2021–22 Union Dutchmen ice hockey season was the 81st season of play for the program and the 30th season in the ECAC Hockey conference. The Dutchmen represented Union College and played their home games at Achilles Center, and were coached by Rick Bennett, in his 10th season.

== Season ==
After losing the entirety of their previous season to the COVID-19 pandemic, Union got a slow start to their season. Neither the offense nor the defense were effective during the first month of the season but, once November rolled around, the Dutchmen began to show some promise. Inconsistent play had the team floating in the middle of the ECAC Hockey standings and by the winter break the team well out of the running for the NCAA tournament.

On January 19, the Union administration received an allegation regarding the conduct of head coach Rick Bennett. He was placed on paid administrative leave the following day when an investigation began and assistant coach John Ronan took over day-to-day responsibilities. Nine days later, after the investigation confirmed the allegation about 'coaching style and practices', Bennett resigned from his position. At the same time, Ronan was confirmed as the interim head coach and would remain in that position until at least the end of the season.

There was a brief uptick in the team's play during the transition but the team flagged in February, slipping down into the bottom third of the conference. Union managed to win its final two regular season games which pushed the team up to 7th and enabled the club to have a home date for the first round of the conference tournament.

The strong play that had suddenly appeared at the end continued into the postseason and Union was dominant in their two wins over Princeton. The team appeared to have turned a corner under Ronan and gave Clarkson everything they had. Against the second-seeded Golden Knights, Murphy was under a wither barrage of shots but he kept his team in both games, allowing the Dutchmen to tie the score on four separate occasions and push both matches into overtime. While the Dutchmen didn't have the firepower to win either contest, the team acquitted themselves well after a very trying campaign.

== Departures ==
Player	Position	Nationality	Cause
Drew Blackmun	Forward	United States	Graduation (retired)
Taylor Brierly	Defenseman	United States	Transferred to (Wilkes)
Sean Harrison	Forward	United States	Graduation (retired)

== Recruiting ==
Player	Position	Nationality	Age	Notes
Cullen Ferguson	Defenseman	Canada	20	Binbrook, ON
Collin Graf	Forward	United States	19	Lincoln, MA
Michael Hodge	Forward	Canada	21	Calgary, AB
Connor Murphy	Goaltender	United States	23	Hudson Falls, NY; transfer from (Northeastern)
Josh Phillips	Defenseman	United States	20	Getzville, NY
Tom Richter	Forward	United States	21	Greenwich, CT
Andrew Seaman	Forward	United States	21	Winnetka, IL
Joe Sharib	Goaltender	United States	20	Natick, MA
Caden Villegas	Forward	United States	20	Plano, TX

== Roster ==
As of September 25, 2021.

No.	Nat.	Player	Class	Pos	Height	Weight	DoB	Hometown	Previous team	NHL rights
1	(United States)	Garrett Nieto	Junior	G	6' 3" (1.91 m)	245 lb (111 kg)	1998-05-15	Yorba Linda, California	Janesville Jets (NAHL)	—
2	(United States)	Josh Phillips	Freshman	D	6' 2" (1.88 m)	190 lb (86 kg)	2001-05-24	Getzville, New York	Minnesota Wilderness (NAHL)	—
4	(Canada)	Dylan Anhorn (A)	Junior	D	6' 0" (1.83 m)	183 lb (83 kg)	1999-01-21	Calgary, Alberta	Prince George Spruce Kings (BCHL)	—
5	(United States)	Nic Petruolo	Sophomore	D	6' 2" (1.88 m)	195 lb (88 kg)	2000-01-29	Neshanic Station, New Jersey	Green Bay Gamblers (USHL)	—
6	(Canada)	Cullen Ferguson	Freshman	D	6' 0" (1.83 m)	185 lb (84 kg)	2001-02-16	Binbrook, Ontario	Aberdeen Wings (NAHL)	—
7	(United States)	Brandon Estes	Senior	D	6' 0" (1.83 m)	185 lb (84 kg)	1998-02-13	Richardson, Texas	Youngstown Phantoms (USHL)	—
8	(United States)	Chaz Smedsrud	Junior	F	6' 2" (1.88 m)	195 lb (88 kg)	1998-06-04	Luverne, Minnesota	Madison Capitols (USHL)	—
9	(Russia)	Gleb Murtazin	Sophomore	F	6' 3" (1.91 m)	205 lb (93 kg)	2000-10-26	Penza, Russia	Amarillo Bulls (NAHL)	—
10	(United States)	Ryan Sidorski	Senior	D	6' 2" (1.88 m)	215 lb (98 kg)	1999-10-02	Williamsville, New York	Buffalo Jr. Sabres (OJHL)	—
11	(Sweden)	Gabriel Seger (A)	Junior	F	6' 4" (1.93 m)	210 lb (95 kg)	1999-11-15	Uppsala, Sweden	Amarillo Bulls (NAHL)	—
12	(United States)	Fletcher Fineman	Senior	D	6' 3" (1.91 m)	197 lb (89 kg)	1999-02-17	Lake Worth, Florida	Springfield Jr. Blues (NAHL)	—
13	(United States)	Tyler Watkins	Sophomore	F	5' 9" (1.75 m)	175 lb (79 kg)	1999-12-19	Hermantown, Minnesota	Minnesota Wilderness (NAHL)	—
14	(United States)	Andrew Seaman	Freshman	F	5' 10" (1.78 m)	170 lb (77 kg)	2000-04-21	Winnetka, Illinois	Prince George Spruce Kings (BCHL)	—
15	(United States)	Thomas Richter	Freshman	F	6' 1" (1.85 m)	175 lb (79 kg)	2000-06-06	Greenwich, Connecticut	Penticton Vees (BCHL)	—
16	(United States)	Christian Sanda	Junior	F	6' 0" (1.83 m)	185 lb (84 kg)	1998-03-13	Vadnais Heights, Minnesota	Coquitlam Express (BCHL)	—
17	(United States)	Matt Allen	Junior	F	6' 2" (1.88 m)	185 lb (84 kg)	1999-03-14	Smithfield, Rhode Island	Boston Junior Bruins (NCDC)	—
18	(Finland)	Ville Immonen	Sophomore	F	6' 2" (1.88 m)	205 lb (93 kg)	1999-06-18	Seinäjoki, Finland	Minot Minotauros (NAHL)	—
19	(Canada)	Liam Robertson	Sophomore	F	6' 2" (1.88 m)	170 lb (77 kg)	2000-05-14	Courtice, Ontario	Youngstown Phantoms (USHL)	—
20	(United States)	Collin Graf	Freshman	F	6' 0" (1.83 m)	180 lb (82 kg)	2002-09-21	Lincoln, Massachusetts	Boston Junior Bruins (NCDC)	—
21	(United States)	Michael Ryan	Senior	D	5' 10" (1.78 m)	175 lb (79 kg)	1997-01-19	Marion, Massachusetts	West Kelowna Warriors (BCHL)	—
22	(United States)	Bram Scheerer	Sophomore	F	6' 3" (1.91 m)	205 lb (93 kg)	1999-06-03	Edina, Minnesota	Minnesota Wilderness (NAHL)	—
23	(United States)	Trevor Adams	Sophomore	F	5' 9" (1.75 m)	165 lb (75 kg)	1999-08-19	Muskegon, Michigan	Chilliwack Chiefs (BCHL)	—
24	(United States)	Alex Cohen	Junior	F	6' 0" (1.83 m)	180 lb (82 kg)	1998-06-15	Boca Raton, Florida	Northeast Generals (NAHL)	—
25	(United States)	Owen Farris	Junior	F	6' 3" (1.91 m)	212 lb (96 kg)	2000-06-08	Dallas, Texas	Muskegon Lumberjacks (USHL)	—
26	(Canada)	Nathan Kelly	Sophomore	D	6' 0" (1.83 m)	185 lb (84 kg)	2000-11-22	South Delta, British Columbia	Chilliwack Chiefs (BCHL)	—
27	(Canada)	Josh Kosack (C)	Senior	F	6' 0" (1.83 m)	180 lb (82 kg)	1997-06-25	Oakville, Ontario	Green Bay Gamblers (USHL)	—
28	(United States)	Caden Villegas	Freshman	F	5' 8" (1.73 m)	165 lb (75 kg)	2001-02-19	Plano, Texas	Tri-City Storm (USHL)	—
29	(Canada)	Michael Hodge	Freshman	F	5' 8" (1.73 m)	157 lb (71 kg)	2000-05-30	Calgary, Alberta	Fort McMurray Oil Barons (AJHL)	—
31	(United States)	Connor Murphy	Junior	G	6' 4" (1.93 m)	200 lb (91 kg)	1998-09-01	Hudson Falls, New York	Northeastern (HEA)	—
33	(Canada)	Merek Pipes	Junior	G	5' 11" (1.8 m)	170 lb (77 kg)	1998-11-12	Cobble Hill, British Columbia	Swan Valley Stampeders (MJHL)	—
35	(United States)	Joe Sharib	Freshman	G	5' 11" (1.8 m)	165 lb (75 kg)	2001-08-16	Natick, Massachusetts	Connecticut Jr. Rangers (NCDC)	—

== Standings ==
2021–22 ECAC Hockey Standings
	Conference record										Overall record					
	GP	W	L	T	OTW	OTL	3/SW	PTS	GF	GA	GP	W	L	T	GF	GA
#8 Quinnipiac †	22	17	4	1	0	1	1	54	71	14	42	32	7	3	139	53
#17 Clarkson	22	14	4	4	0	2	3	51	86	47	37	21	10	6	123	85
#15 Harvard *	22	14	6	2	0	0	2	46	69	46	35	21	11	3	116	82
Cornell	22	12	6	4	2	1	0	39	73	47	32	18	10	4	100	72
Colgate	22	9	9	4	1	0	3	33	55	57	40	18	18	4	111	112
Rensselaer	22	10	12	0	0	0	0	30	58	63	44	18	23	3	114	119
Union	22	9	11	2	3	1	0	27	52	66	37	14	19	4	89	110
St. Lawrence	22	7	10	5	2	0	2	26	44	60	37	11	19	7	72	110
Brown	22	6	12	4	0	1	2	25	36	61	31	7	20	4	50	100
Princeton	22	7	14	1	0	1	0	23	54	89	31	8	21	2	70	122
Yale	22	7	14	1	3	1	1	21	38	60	30	8	21	1	55	90
Dartmouth	22	5	15	2	0	3	1	21	45	71	32	7	22	3	69	110
Championship: March 19, 2022 † indicates conference regular season champion (Cleary Cup) * indicates conference tournament champion (Whitelaw Cup); Rankings: USCHO.com Top 20 Poll

== Schedule and results ==
Date	Time	Opponent^{#}	Rank^{#}	Site	TV	Decision	Result	Attendance	Record
Exhibition
October 2	4:00 PM	Rensselaer*		Achilles Rink • Schenectady, New York (Exhibition)			L 2–5	0	
Regular Season
October 8	7:00 PM	at New Hampshire*		Whittemore Center • Durham, New Hampshire		Murphy	L 1–4	3,409	0–1–0
October 9	7:00 PM	at New Hampshire*		Whittemore Center • Durham, New Hampshire		Murphy	L 2–3	3,273	0–2–0
October 15	7:00 PM	Colorado College*		Achilles Rink • Schenectady, New York		Murphy	W 2–1	1,435	1–2–0
October 16	7:00 PM	Colorado College*		Achilles Rink • Schenectady, New York		Murphy	T 3–3	0	1–2–1
October 22	7:00 PM	at Lake Superior State*		Taffy Abel Arena • Sault Ste. Marie, Michigan		Murphy	L 4–7	1,109	1–3–1
October 23	7:00 PM	at Lake Superior State*		Taffy Abel Arena • Sault Ste. Marie, Michigan		Murphy	L 2–5	965	1–4–1
October 29	7:00 PM	Rensselaer		Achilles Rink • Schenectady, New York		Murphy	L 2–4	1,738	1–5–1 (0–1–0)
October 30	7:00 PM	at Rensselaer		Houston Field House • Troy, New York		Murphy	L 0–3	693	1–6–1 (0–2–0)
November 5	7:00 PM	Clarkson		Achilles Rink • Schenectady, New York		Murphy	W 4–3 ^{OT}	1,691	2–6–1 (1–2–0)
November 6	7:00 PM	St. Lawrence		Achilles Rink • Schenectady, New York		Nieto	T 2–2 ^{SOL}	1,594	2–6–2 (1–2–1)
November 12	7:00 PM	at #13 Cornell		Lynah Rink • Ithaca, New York		Murphy	L 1–4	2,411	2–7–2 (1–3–1)
November 13	7:00 PM	at Colgate		Class of 1965 Arena • Hamilton, New York		Murphy	W 2–0	528	3–7–2 (2–3–1)
November 27	4:00 PM	at Merrimack*		J. Thom Lawler Rink • North Andover, Massachusetts		Murphy	W 3–2	1,746	4–7–2
December 3	7:00 PM	Princeton		Achilles Rink • Schenectady, New York		Murphy	W 1–0 ^{OT}	1,250	5–7–2 (3–3–1)
December 4	7:00 PM	#4 Quinnipiac		Achilles Rink • Schenectady, New York		Murphy	L 0–4	1,723	5–8–2 (3–4–1)
December 10	7:30 PM	at Maine*		Alfond Arena • Orono, Maine		Murphy	T 1–1	2,631	5–8–3
December 11	5:00 PM	at Maine*		Alfond Arena • Orono, Maine		Murphy	L 3–4	3,065	5–9–3
January 8	7:00 PM	at #19 Harvard		Bright-Landry Hockey Center • Boston, Massachusetts		Murphy	L 1–4	250	5–10–3 (3–5–1)
January 14	7:00 PM	at St. Lawrence		Appleton Arena • Canton, New York		Murphy	W 3–2 ^{OT}	492	6–10–3 (4–5–1)
January 15	7:00 PM	at Clarkson		Cheel Arena • Potsdam, New York		Murphy	L 2–8	2,336	6–11–3 (4–6–1)
January 21	7:00 PM	Brown		Achilles Rink • Schenectady, New York		Murphy	W 3–1	1,493	7–11–3 (5–6–1)
January 22	7:00 PM	Yale		Achilles Rink • Schenectady, New York		Murphy	L 2–3 ^{OT}	1,572	7–12–3 (5–7–1)
January 26	7:00 PM	at Dartmouth		Thompson Arena • Hanover, New Hampshire		Murphy	W 3–2	118	8–12–3 (6–7–1)
January 29	2:00 PM	vs. Rensselaer*		Times Union Center • Albany, New York (Mayor's Cup)		Murphy	W 2–0	4,222	9–12–3
February 1	7:00 PM	Long Island*		Times Union Center • Albany, New York		Murphy	L 1–4	1,252	9–13–3
February 4	7:00 PM	at #2 Quinnipiac		People's United Center • Hamden, Connecticut		Murphy	L 1–2	2,939	9–14–3 (6–8–1)
February 5	7:00 PM	at Princeton		Hobey Baker Memorial Rink • Princeton, New Jersey		Murphy	W 7–3	1,256	10–14–3 (7–8–1)
February 11	7:00 PM	Colgate		Achilles Rink • Schenectady, New York		Murphy	L 4–6	1,325	10–15–3 (7–9–1)
February 12	7:00 PM	#16 Cornell		Achilles Rink • Schenectady, New York		Murphy	L 2–5	1,721	10–16–3 (7–10–1)
February 18	7:00 PM	at Yale		Ingalls Rink • New Haven, Connecticut		Murphy	L 2–3	903	10–17–3 (7–11–1)
February 19	7:00 PM	at Brown		Meehan Auditorium • Providence, Rhode Island		Murphy	T 2–2 ^{SOL}	537	10–17–4 (7–11–2)
February 25	7:00 PM	Harvard		Achilles Rink • Schenectady, New York		Murphy	W 5–3	1,551	11–17–4 (8–11–2)
February 26	7:00 PM	Dartmouth		Achilles Rink • Schenectady, New York		Murphy	W 3–2 ^{OT}	1,537	12–17–4 (9–11–2)
ECAC Hockey Tournament
March 4	7:00 PM	Princeton*		Achilles Rink • Schenectady, New York (First Round game 1)		Murphy	W 3–2	1,473	13–17–4
March 5	7:00 PM	Princeton*		Achilles Rink • Schenectady, New York (First Round game 2)		Murphy	W 5–1	1,435	14–17–4
Union Won Series 2–0
March 11	7:00 PM	at #17 Clarkson*		Cheel Arena • Potsdam, New York (Quarterfinal game 1)		Murphy	L 2–3 ^{OT}	1,847	14–18–4
March 12	7:00 PM	at #17 Clarkson*		Cheel Arena • Potsdam, New York (Quarterfinal game 2)		Murphy	L 4–5 ^{OT}	2,077	14–19–4
Union Lost Series 0–2
*Non-conference game. ^{#}Rankings from USCHO.com Poll. All times are in Eastern Time. Source:

== Scoring statistics ==
Name	Position	Games	Goals	Assists	Points	PIM
Brandon Estes	D	37	7	22	29	10
Collin Graf	C/RW	37	11	11	22	10
Gabriel Seger	C/LW	34	7	14	21	21
Dylan Anhorn	D	29	7	13	20	6
Liam Robertson	C	35	13	6	19	18
Chaz Smedsrud	LW	37	5	11	16	10
Tyler Watkins	F	34	4	12	16	4
Josh Kosack	RW	37	8	6	14	12
Michael Hodge	F	34	5	5	10	12
Cullen Ferguson	D	37	0	10	10	22
Owen Farris	F	22	3	5	8	12
Caden Villegas	F	32	3	5	8	10
Matthew Allen	C	25	2	5	7	6
Christian Sanda	F	24	3	3	6	25
Ville Immonen	C	37	3	3	6	12
Nicolas Petruolo	D	27	1	5	6	26
Andrew Seaman	F	23	3	2	5	4
Gleb Murtazin	RW	16	2	1	3	12
Bram Scheerer	LW	8	0	3	3	25
Nathan Kelly	D	32	0	3	3	6
Ryan Sidorski	D	35	0	3	3	22
Trevor Adams	F	13	0	2	2	4
Tom Richter	F	11	1	0	1	0
Michael Ryan	D	16	1	0	1	0
Joe Sharib	G	1	0	0	0	0
Alex Cohen	C	3	0	0	0	2
Garrett Nieto	G	3	0	0	0	0
Josh Phillips	D	12	0	0	0	10
Fletcher Fineman	D	14	0	0	0	0
Connor Murphy	G	37	0	0	0	4
Bench	-	-	-	-	-	4
Total			89	150	239	309

== Goaltending statistics ==
Name	Games	Minutes	Wins	Losses	Ties	Goals against	Saves	Shut outs	SV %	GAA
Joe Sharib	1	5	0	0	0	0	1	0	1.000	0.00
Connor Murphy	37	2123	14	18	3	94	1060	3	.919	2.66
Garrett Nieto	3	115	0	1	1	8	42	0	.840	4.18
Empty Net	-	22	-	-	-	8	-	-	-	-
Total	37	2268	14	19	4	110	1103	3	.903	2.91

== Rankings ==
Poll	Week																									
Poll	Pre	1	2	3	4	5	6	7	8	9	10	11	12	13	14	15	16	17	18	19	20	21	22	23	24	25 (Final)
USCHO.com	NR	NR	NR	NR	NR	NR	NR	NR	NR	NR	NR	NR	NR	NR	NR	NR	NR	NR	NR	NR	NR	NR	NR	NR	-	NR
USA Today	NR	NR	NR	NR	NR	NR	NR	NR	NR	NR	NR	NR	NR	NR	NR	NR	NR	NR	NR	NR	NR	NR	NR	NR	NR	NR

Note: USCHO did not release a poll in week 24.

== Awards and honors ==
Player	Award	Ref
Josh Kosack	ECAC Hockey Student-Athlete of the Year	
Brandon Estes	ECAC Hockey Third Team	
