= 2019 ECAC Hockey men's ice hockey tournament =

2019 ECAC Men's ice hockey tournament
- Dates: March 8–23, 2019
- Teams: 12
- Finals site: Herb Brooks Arena; Lake Placid, New York
- Champions: Clarkson (6th title)
- Winning coach: Casey Jones (1st title)
- MVP: Devin Brosseau (Clarkson)
- ECAC Men's Ice Hockey Tournaments

The 2019 ECAC Hockey Men's Ice Hockey Tournament is the 58th tournament in league history. It was played between March 8 and March 23, 2019. First Round and Quarterfinal games are played at home team campus sites, while the final four games are played at the Herb Brooks Arena in Lake Placid, New York. The tournament winner, Clarkson, received the ECAC's automatic bid to the 2019 NCAA Division I Men's Ice Hockey Tournament.

== Format ==
The tournament features four rounds of play. The teams that finish above fifth place in the standings receive a bye to the quarterfinal round. In the first round, the fifth and twelfth seeds, the sixth and eleventh seeds, the seventh and tenth seeds and the eighth and ninth seeds play a best-of-three series with the winners advancing to the quarterfinals. In the quarterfinals the one seed plays the lowest remaining seed, the second seed plays the second-lowest remaining seed, the third seed plays the third-lowest remaining seed and the fourth seed plays the fourth-lowest remaining seed in another best-of-three series with the winners of these the series advancing to the semifinals. In the semifinals the top remaining seed plays the lowest remaining seed while the two remaining teams play against each other. The winners of the semifinals play in the championship game, and no third-place game is played. All series after the quarterfinals are single-elimination games. The tournament champion receives an automatic bid to the 2019 NCAA Division I Men's Ice Hockey Tournament.

=== Standings ===
2018–19 ECAC Hockey Standings
	Conference record							Overall record					
	GP	W	L	T	PTS	GF	GA	GP	W	L	T	GF	GA
#7 Quinnipiac†	22	14	6	2	30	77	47	38	26	10	2	133	73
#8 Cornell†	22	13	5	4	30	64	41	36	21	11	4	108	73
#11 Clarkson*	22	13	7	2	28	65	42	39	26	11	2	122	78
#14 Harvard	22	13	7	2	28	77	58	33	19	11	3	106	83
Dartmouth	22	10	9	3	23	53	55	34	13	17	4	87	93
Yale	22	11	10	1	23	53	57	33	15	15	3	85	88
Union	22	10	10	2	22	60	64	39	20	13	6	112	102
Brown	22	8	9	5	21	52	59	34	15	14	5	89	97
Princeton	22	8	12	2	18	60	66	31	10	18	3	83	96
Colgate	22	7	12	3	17	43	64	36	10	23	3	55	111
Rensselaer	22	7	13	2	16	49	67	36	10	23	3	69	117
St. Lawrence	22	3	17	2	8	51	84	37	6	29	2	75	149
Championship: March 23, 2019 † indicates conference regular season champion (Cleary Cup) * indicates conference tournament champion (Whitelaw Cup); Rankings: USCHO.com Top 20 Poll

== Bracket ==
Teams are reseeded for the Quarterfinals and Semifinals

First Round; March 8–10
5	Dartmouth	3	2	8
12	St. Lawrence	2	3*	0
6	Yale	4	4	—
11	Rensselaer	1	0	—
7	Union	4	4	—
10	Colgate	1	0	—
8	Brown	3	6***	—
9	Princeton	0	5	—

Quarterfinals; March 15–17
1	Quinnipiac	1	3	—
8	Brown	2*	4	—
2	Cornell	2	4	4
7	Union	3	0	2
3	Clarkson	3	5	—
6	Yale	1	2	—
4	Harvard	3	4*	—
5	Dartmouth	1	3	—

Semifinals; March 22
2	Cornell	6
8	Brown	0
3	Clarkson	5
4	Harvard	2

Championship; March 23
2	Cornell	2
3	Clarkson	3*

Note: * denotes overtime period(s)

== Results ==
=== First round ===
==== (5) Dartmouth vs. (12) St. Lawrence ====
March 8	Dartmouth	3 – 2	St. Lawrence	Thompson Arena	Recap
(Foreman, Matthews) Drew O'Connor - 10:17 (Graber, Yau) Quin Foreman - PP - 15:01		First period	06:33 - Ryan Garvey (Gicewicz, White)
(Sellar) Collin Rutherford - GW - 03:40		Second period	09:45 - Dylan Woolf (unassisted)
No scoring		Third period	No scoring
( 14 saves / 16 shots ) Adrian Clark		Goalie stats	Emil Zetterquist ( 33 saves / 36 shots )

March 9	Dartmouth	2 – 3	OT	St. Lawrence	Thompson Arena	Recap
(Jasiek, Rutherford) Jeffrey Losurdo - PP - 16:46		First period		14:43 - Michael Ederer (unassisted)
(Graber, Foreman) Drew O'Connor - 07:09		Second period		04:28 - PP - Cade Gleekel (Laidley, Risteau)
No scoring		Third period		No scoring
No scoring		First overtime period		17:33 - GW - Zach Risteau (Ederer, Hanson)
( 21 saves / 24 shots ) Adrian Clark		Goalie stats		Daniel Mannella ( 58 saves / 60 shots )

March 10	Dartmouth	8 – 0	St. Lawrence	Thompson Arena	Recap
(Losurdo, Baker) Alex Jasiek - GW - 06:20		First period	No scoring
(Foreman, Matthews) Will Graber - 00:37 (Foreman, Baker) Will Graber - PP - 04:17 (Hesler, Jasiek) Jeffrey Losurdo - 06:24 (Roth, Foreman) Drew O'Connor - PP - 11:59 (Graber, Baker) Quin Foreman - PP - 13:59		Second period	No scoring
(Jasiek, Kilistoff) Ryan Blankemeier - 02:04 (Jasiek, Losurdo) Carl Hesler - 11:09		Third period	No scoring
( 22 saves / 22 shots ) Adrian Clark		Goalie stats	Daniel Mannella ( 13 saves / 17 shots ) / Emil Zetterquist ( 16 saves / 20 shots )

Dartmouth won series 2–1

==== (6) Yale vs. (11) Rensselaer ====
March 8	Yale	4 – 1	Rensselaer	Ingalls Rink	Recap
No scoring		First period	No scoring
(Snively, Lillibridge) Justin Pearson - 02:51		Second period	No scoring
(Pearson, Sweezey) Ted Hart - GW - 01:49 (Sweezey) Evan Smith - 10:30 (Gaus, Hall) Chandler Lindstrand - EN - 19:34		Third period	18:49 - EA - Ottoville Leppänen (Linden, Reilly)
( 24 saves / 24 shots ) Corbin Kaczperski		Goalie stats	Owen Savory ( 30 saves / 33 shots )

March 9	Yale	4 – 0	Rensselaer	Ingalls Rink	Recap
(Snively, Hall) Jack St. Ivany - GW - 04:03		First period	No scoring
(Welsh, St. Ivany) Joe Snively - PP - 06:06 (Snively, St. Ivany) Tyler Welsh - PP - 17:55		Second period	No scoring
(Smith, Sweezey) Anthony Walsh - EN - 19:38		Third period	No scoring
( 25 saves / 25 shots ) Sam Tucker		Goalie stats	Owen Savory ( 26 saves / 29 shots )

Yale won series 2–0

==== (7) Union vs. (10) Colgate ====
March 8	Union	4 – 1	Colgate	Achilles Center	Recap
(Maier, Adams) Ryan Walker - PP - 07:28		First period	16:32 - Adam Dauda (Meyer, Citron)
(Kolias, Morgan) Cole Maier - GW - 04:53 (Foo) Jack Adams - 05:13		Second period	No scoring
(Estes, Kolias) Liam Morgan - EN - 19:26		Third period	No scoring
( 25 saves / 26 shots ) Darion Hanson		Goalie stats	Mitch Benson ( 28 saves / 31 shots )

March 9	Union	4 – 0	Colgate	Achilles Center	Recap
(unassisted) Anthony Rinaldi - GW - 11:21		First period	No scoring
No scoring		Second period	No scoring
(Maier, Morgan) Ryan Walker - 09:12 (Rinaldi, Vidmar) Vas Kolias - 14:26 (Walker, Kolias) Liam Morgan - EN - 19:50		Third period	No scoring
( 29 saves / 29 shots ) Darion Hanson		Goalie stats	Mitch Benson ( 27 saves / 30 shots )

Union won series 2–0

==== (8) Brown vs. (9) Princeton ====
March 8	Brown	3 – 0	Princeton	Meehan Auditorium	Recap
No Scoring		First period	No scoring
(Marchin, Crozier) Chris Berger - GW - 09:35		Second period	No scoring
(Beaudoin) Max Gottlieb - 17:37 (Beaudoin, Ferrario) Justin Jallen - EN - 17:58		Third period	No scoring
( 21 saves / 21 shots ) Gavin Nieto		Goalie stats	Jeremie Forget ( 33 saves / 35 shots )

March 9	Brown	6 – 5	3OT	Princeton	Meehan Auditorium	Recap
(Giuttari) Justin Jallen - 12:16 (Brink, Stillwell) Brady Schoo - 12:46		First period		14:43 - Alex Riche (Kuffner, Cressey)
No scoring		Second period		11:43 - Ryan Kuffner (Riche)
(Stillwell, Berger) Tommy Marchin - 01:11 (Brink) Colin Burston - 07:09 (Giuttari) Brady Schoo - 15:23		Third period		16:24 - EA - Alex Riche (Cressey, Véronneau); 17:41 - EA - Ryan Kuffner (Grande, Cressey); 19:11 - EA - Jackson Cressey (Kuffner, Riche)
(Beaudoin) Alex Brink - GW - 03:30		Third overtime period		No scoring
( 35 saves / 40 shots ) Gavin Nieto		Goalie stats		Ryan Ferland ( 31 saves / 34 shots ) / Jeremie Forget ( 17 saves / 20 shots ) / Austin Shaw ( 0 saves / 0 shots )

Brown won series 2–0

=== Quarterfinals ===
==== (1) Quinnipiac vs. (8) Brown ====
March 15	Quinnipiac	1 – 2	OT	Brown	People's United Center	Recap
No Scoring		First period		No scoring
(DiLiberatore, Jermain) Kārlis Čukste - 04:21		Second period		No scoring
No scoring		Third period		19:38 - EA - Brent Beaudoin (Giuttari, Gottlieb)
No scoring		First overtime period		17:02 - GW - Jack Gessert (Burston, Stillwell)
( 38 saves / 40 shots ) Andrew Shortridge		Goalie stats		Gavin Nieto ( 25 saves / 26 shots )

March 16	Quinnipiac	3 – 4	Brown	People's United Center	Recap
(Čukste, Martin) Alex Whelan - 01:08 (Fällström, Rafferty) Alex Whelan - 14:12		First period	No scoring
No scoring		Second period	No scoring
(Whelan, DiLiberatore) Craig Martin - EA - 18:04		Third period	01:22 - Max Gottlieb (Burston, Gessert); 01:54 - Tommy Marchin (Berger, Giuttari); 11:21 - Brent Beaudoin (unassisted); 13:13 - GW - Tommy Marchin (Berger, Crozier)
( 23 saves / 27 shots ) Andrew Shortridge		Goalie stats	Gavin Nieto ( 28 saves / 31 shots )

Brown won series 2–0

==== (2) Cornell vs. (7) Union ====
March 15	Cornell	2 – 3	Union	Lynah Rink	Recap
No Scoring		First period	No scoring
(Locke, Barron) Matthew Nuttle - 12:34 (Mullin, Bauld) Kyle Betts - 18:58		Second period	09:37 - Sebastian Vidmar (Rinaldi, Campbell)
No scoring		Third period	10:40 - Cole Maier (Kolias, Morgan); 15:27 - GW - Brett Supinski (Estes, Vidmar)
( 16 saves / 19 shots ) Matthew Galajda		Goalie stats	Darion Hanson ( 32 saves / 34 shots )

March 16	Cornell	4 – 0	Union	Lynah Rink	Recap
(Donaldson, Barron) Brenden Locke - GW - 01:21 (Starrett, Smith) Mitch Vanderlaan - 02:02		First period	No scoring
(McCrea, Malott) Noah Bauld - 16:57		Second period	No scoring
(Betts, Bauld) Alex Green - 11:05		Third period	No scoring
( 15 saves / 15 shots ) Matthew Galajda		Goalie stats	Darion Hanson ( 29 saves / 33 shots )

March 17	Cornell	4 – 2	Union	Lynah Rink	Recap
(Bauld, Mullin) Kyle Betts - 00:57		First period	04:31 - Anthony Rinaldi (Supinski); 05:43 - Sean Harrison (Foo, Adams)
(Vanderlaan) Beau Starrett - 08:29		Second period	No scoring
(Bauld) Tristan Mullin - GW PP - 03:00 (Kaldis, Vanderlaan) Jeff Malott - 03:42		Third period	No scoring
( 27 saves / 29 shots ) Matthew Galajda		Goalie stats	Darion Hanson ( 30 saves / 34 shots )

Cornell won series 2–1

==== (3) Clarkson vs. (6) Yale ====
March 15	Clarkson	3 – 1	Yale	Cheel Arena	Recap
(McCarthy, Brosseau) Josh Dunne - PP - 04:22 (Tisdale, MacLean) Nick Campoli - GW - 13:05 (Dunne, Moro) Aaron Thow - 13:48		First period	No scoring
No scoring		Second period	No scoring
No scoring		Third period	15:08 - Jack St. Ivany (unassisted)
( 23 saves / 24 shots ) Jake Kielly		Goalie stats	Sam Tucker ( 24 saves / 27 shots )

March 16	Clarkson	5 – 2	Yale	Cheel Arena	Recap
(Sturm, Egle) Jack Jacome - PP - 16:43		First period	No scoring
(Kuzmeski, McCarthy) Devin Brosseau - PP - 01:50		Second period	15:01 - Ted Hart (Smith); 15:08 - Jack St. Ivany (Lindstrand, Smith)
(Brosseau, Callin) Josh Dunne - GW PP - 06:17 (Klack) Devin Brosseau - PP - 10:39 (Jacome, Egle) Nico Sturm - 15:53		Third period	No scoring
( 32 saves / 34 shots ) Jake Kielly		Goalie stats	Sam Tucker ( 25 saves / 30 shots )

Clarkson won series 2–0

==== (4) Harvard vs. (5) Dartmouth ====
March 15	Harvard	3 – 1	Dartmouth	Bright-Landry Hockey Center	Recap
No scoring		First period	No scoring
(Rathbone, Fox) Lewis Zerter-Gossage - 09:08		Second period	07:50 - Ryan Blankemeier (Strong)
(Kerfoot) Adam Fox - GW - 11:51 (Shore, Fox) Colton Kerfoot - EN - 18:46		Third period	No scoring
( 19 saves / 20 shots ) Cameron Gornet		Goalie stats	Adrian Clark ( 27 saves / 29 shots )

March 9	Harvard	4 – 3	OT	Dartmouth	Bright-Landry Hockey Center	Recap
(Fox, Walsh) Jack Drury - PP - 11:25		First period		01:03 - Brendan Demler (Blankemeier); 02:35 - Drew O'Connor (Foreman, Graber)
(Fox, Rathbone) Michael Floodstrand - 02:29 (Fox, Dornbach) Reilly Walsh - PP - 06:44		Second period		12:30 - Quin Foreman (Yau, Graber)
No scoring		Third period		No scoring
(Badini) Nathan Krusko - GW - 02:06		First overtime period		No scoring
( 36 saves / 39 shots ) Cameron Gornet		Goalie stats		Adrian Clark ( 36 saves / 40 shots )

Harvard won series 2–0

=== Semifinals ===
==== (2) Cornell vs. (8) Brown ====
March 22	Cornell	6 – 0	Brown	Herb Brooks Arena	Recap
(Locke, McCrea) Matthew Nuttle - GW PP - 04:10 (Smith, Starrett) Noah Bauld - PP - 06:23 (Kaldis) Tristan Mullin - 12:08		First period	No scoring
(Kaldis, Galajda) Morgan Barron - 13:33		Second period	No scoring
(Mullin) Joe Leahy - 07:40 (unassisted) Kyle Betts - SH EN - 12:40		Third period	No scoring
( 30 saves / 30 shots ) Matthew Galajda		Goalie stats	Gavin Nieto ( 16 saves / 21 shots )

==== (3) Clarkson vs. (4) Harvard ====
March 22	Clarkson	5 – 2	Harvard	Herb Brooks Arena	Recap
(Sturm) Haralds Egle - 02:59 (Schneider, Hurley) Anthony Callin - 05:13		First period	No scoring
(Thow, Jokiharju) Nick Campoli - GW - 13:14		Second period	14:13 - Wyllum Deveaux (Fox, Badini)
(Sturm, Egle) Jack Jacome - 08:08 (MacLean, Tisdale) Jordan Schneider - 15:54		Third period	01:13 - Jack Rathbone (Fox, Shore)
( 26 saves / 28 shots ) Jake Kielly		Goalie stats	Michael Lackey ( 19 saves / 22 shots ) / Cameron Gornet ( 7 saves / 9 shots )

=== Championship ===
==== (2) Cornell vs. (3) Clarkson ====
March 23	Cornell	2 – 3	OT	Clarkson	Herb Brooks Arena	Recap
(Locke, Kaldis) Noah Bauld - 07:29		First period		12:26 - PP - Devin Brosseau (Dunne, Thow); 16:43 - PP - Devin Brosseau (Dunne, White)
No scoring		Second period		No scoring
(Nuttle, Vanderlaan) Tristan Mullin - 14:19		Third period		No scoring
No scoring		First overtime period		14:36 - Chris Klack (Brosseau)
( 23 saves / 25 shots ) Matthew Galajda / ( 1 saves / 2 shots ) Austin McGrath		Goalie stats		Jake Kielly ( 29 saves / 31 shots )

== Tournament awards ==
=== All-Tournament Team ===
- F Noah Bauld (Cornell)
- F Devin Brosseau* (Clarkson)
- F Nico Sturm (Clarkson)
- D Yanni Kaldis (Cornell)
- D Matt Nuttle (Cornell)
- G Jake Kielly (Clarkson)

* Most Outstanding Player(s)
