= 2026–27 NHL transactions =

The following is a list of all team-to-team transactions that have occurred in the National Hockey League for the 2026–27 NHL season. It lists which team each player has been traded to, signed by, or claimed by, and for which player(s) or draft pick(s), if applicable. Players who have retired or that have had their contracts terminated are also listed.

The 2026–27 NHL trade deadline will be on March 1, 2027. Players traded or claimed off waivers after that date will not be eligible to play in the 2027 Stanley Cup playoffs.

== Retirement ==
Date	Player	Last team	Ref
July 2, 2026	Gannon Laroque	Montreal Canadiens	
July 13, 2026	Jordan Oesterle	Nashville Predators	
July 21, 2026	Andrew Agozzino	Utah Mammoth	
August 7, 2026	Noah Philp	Anaheim Ducks	
September 11, 2026	Connor Ingram	Edmonton Oilers	
September 11, 2026	John Klingberg	San Jose Sharks	
September 16, 2026	Ryan Reaves	San Jose Sharks	
September 21, 2026	Kevin Hayes	Pittsburgh Penguins	
October 9, 2026	Matt Dumba	Pittsburgh Penguins	

== Contract terminations ==
A team and player may mutually agree to terminate a player's contract at any time. All players must clear waivers before having a contract terminated.

Buyouts can only occur at specific times of the year. For more details on contract terminations as buyouts:

Teams may buy out player contracts (after the conclusion of a season) for a portion of the remaining value of the contract, paid over a period of twice the remaining length of the contract. This reduced number and extended period is applied to the cap hit as well.

- If the player was under the age of 26 at the time of the buyout the player's pay and cap hit will reduced by a factor of 2/3 over the extended period.
- If the player was 26 or older at the time of the buyout the player's pay and cap hit will reduced by a factor of 1/3 over the extended period.
- If the player was 35 or older at the time of signing the contract the player's pay will be reduced by a factor of 1/3, but the cap hit will not be reduced over the extended period.

Injured players cannot be bought out.

Date	Player	Previous team	Notes	Ref
July 1, 2026	Jonathan Drouin	St. Louis Blues	Buyout	
September 10, 2026	Chris Kreider	Anaheim Ducks	Mutual termination	
November 8, 2026	James Reimer	New York Rangers	Mutual termination	
November 12, 2026	Ilya Safonov	Vancouver Canucks	Mutual termination	

== Free agency ==
Note: This does not include players who have re-signed with their previous team as an unrestricted free agent or as a restricted free agent.

Date	Player	New team	Previous team	Ref
July 1, 2026	Trevor van Riemsdyk	Pittsburgh Penguins	Washington Capitals	
July 1, 2026	Erik Haula	Los Angeles Kings	Nashville Predators	
July 1, 2026	Colton Sissons	Toronto Maple Leafs	Vegas Golden Knights	
July 1, 2026	Mats Zuccarello	Los Angeles Kings	Minnesota Wild	
July 1, 2026	Jaden Schwartz	Colorado Avalanche	Seattle Kraken	
July 1, 2026	Cole Smith	Chicago Blackhawks	Vegas Golden Knights	
July 1, 2026	Mason Marchment	San Jose Sharks	Columbus Blue Jackets	
July 1, 2026	Corey Perry	Los Angeles Kings	Tampa Bay Lightning	
July 1, 2026	Ryan Lomberg	Columbus Blue Jackets	Calgary Flames	
July 1, 2026	Ian Cole	Chicago Blackhawks	Utah Mammoth	
July 1, 2026	Ilya Mikheyev	Tampa Bay Lightning	Chicago Blackhawks	
July 1, 2026	Ross Johnston	St. Louis Blues	Anaheim Ducks	
July 1, 2026	Dennis Gilbert	Buffalo Sabres	Ottawa Senators	
July 1, 2026	Jeffrey Viel	Tampa Bay Lightning	Anaheim Ducks	
July 1, 2026	Brendan Gaunce	Boston Bruins	Columbus Blue Jackets	
July 1, 2026	Noah Juulsen	Colorado Avalanche	Philadelphia Flyers	
July 1, 2026	Viktor Arvidsson	Detroit Red Wings	Boston Bruins	
July 1, 2026	Jack Roslovic	Toronto Maple Leafs	Edmonton Oilers	
July 1, 2026	Stuart Skinner	Winnipeg Jets	Pittsburgh Penguins	
July 1, 2026	Noel Acciari	Philadelphia Flyers	Pittsburgh Penguins	
July 1, 2026	Declan Carlile	Pittsburgh Penguins	Tampa Bay Lightning	
July 1, 2026	Mike Benning	Calgary Flames	Florida Panthers	
July 1, 2026	Vítek Vaněček	New York Islanders	Utah Mammoth	
July 1, 2026	Joe Veleno	New York Rangers	Montreal Canadiens	
July 1, 2026	Danila Klimovich	Philadelphia Flyers	Vancouver Canucks	
July 1, 2026	Matias Maccelli	New York Islanders	Toronto Maple Leafs	
July 1, 2026	Paul Cotter	Vancouver Canucks	New Jersey Devils	
July 1, 2026	Scott Perunovich	Los Angeles Kings	Utah Mammoth	
July 1, 2026	Justin Kirkland	Minnesota Wild	Calgary Flames	
July 1, 2026	Matthew Kessel	New York Islanders	St. Louis Blues	
July 1, 2026	Luke Schenn	Vancouver Canucks	Buffalo Sabres	
July 1, 2026	Jacob Trouba	San Jose Sharks	Anaheim Ducks	
July 1, 2026	Lane Pederson	Los Angeles Kings	Philadelphia Flyers	
July 1, 2026	Sergei Bobrovsky	Toronto Maple Leafs	Florida Panthers	
July 1, 2026	Brandon Halverson	Dallas Stars	Tampa Bay Lightning	
July 1, 2026	Connor Clifton	Boston Bruins	Pittsburgh Penguins	
July 1, 2026	Alexander Kerfoot	Nashville Predators	Utah Mammoth	
July 1, 2026	Vladislav Kolyachonok	New Jersey Devils	Dallas Stars	
July 1, 2026	Akil Thomas	Vancouver Canucks	St. Louis Blues	
July 1, 2026	Teddy Blueger	Toronto Maple Leafs	Vancouver Canucks	
July 1, 2026	Jonny Brodzinski	Washington Capitals	New York Rangers	
July 1, 2026	Pheonix Copley	Columbus Blue Jackets	Los Angeles Kings	
July 1, 2026	Trey Fix-Wolansky	Vancouver Canucks	New York Rangers	
July 1, 2026	Zach Aston-Reese	Philadelphia Flyers	Columbus Blue Jackets	
July 1, 2026	Brandon Duhaime	Toronto Maple Leafs	Washington Capitals	
July 1, 2026	Oliver Bjorkstrand	New York Rangers	Tampa Bay Lightning	
July 1, 2026	Justin Holl	Washington Capitals	St. Louis Blues	
July 1, 2026	Andrei Kuzmenko	Pittsburgh Penguins	Los Angeles Kings	
July 1, 2026	Marc Del Gaizo	New York Rangers	Montreal Canadiens	
July 1, 2026	Vincent Desharnais	Washington Capitals	San Jose Sharks	
July 1, 2026	Nick Jensen	Anaheim Ducks	Ottawa Senators	
July 1, 2026	Jett Woo	Anaheim Ducks	San Jose Sharks	
July 1, 2026	Victor Olofsson	Vegas Golden Knights	Calgary Flames	
July 1, 2026	Josh Dunne	Washington Capitals	Buffalo Sabres	
July 1, 2026	Calvin Pickard	Minnesota Wild	Edmonton Oilers	
July 1, 2026	Alex Petrovic	Florida Panthers	Dallas Stars	
July 1, 2026	Jacob Bryson	Detroit Red Wings	Winnipeg Jets	
July 1, 2026	Mason Shaw	Minnesota Wild	Winnipeg Jets	
July 1, 2026	Adam Beckman	Colorado Avalanche	New York Islanders	
July 1, 2026	Daniil Tarasov	Detroit Red Wings	Florida Panthers	
July 1, 2026	Eric Comrie	San Jose Sharks	Winnipeg Jets	
July 1, 2026	Jeff Malott	Anaheim Ducks	Los Angeles Kings	
July 1, 2026	Cameron Butler	Detroit Red Wings	Minnesota Wild	
July 1, 2026	Conor Sheary	Buffalo Sabres	New York Rangers	
July 1, 2026	Jason Polin	Buffalo Sabres	Colorado Avalanche	
July 1, 2026	Boone Jenner	Washington Capitals	Columbus Blue Jackets	
July 1, 2026	Lars Eller	Florida Panthers	Ottawa Senators	
July 1, 2026	Mitchell Chaffee	New York Islanders	Tampa Bay Lightning	
July 1, 2026	Zack MacEwen	Toronto Maple Leafs	New Jersey Devils	
July 1, 2026	Jack Ahcan	Nashville Predators	Colorado Avalanche	
July 1, 2026	Hunter Skinner	Nashville Predators	St. Louis Blues	
July 1, 2026	Curtis Douglas	Seattle Kraken	Vancouver Canucks	
July 1, 2026	Cam Dineen	Philadelphia Flyers	Edmonton Oilers	
July 1, 2026	Jack Studnicka	Philadelphia Flyers	Florida Panthers	
July 1, 2026	Samuel Poulin	Montreal Canadiens	Edmonton Oilers	
July 1, 2026	Ethan Samson	Montreal Canadiens	Tampa Bay Lightning	
July 1, 2026	Noah Gregor	Winnipeg Jets	Florida Panthers	
July 1, 2026	Riley Tufte	New Jersey Devils	Boston Bruins	
July 1, 2026	Wilmer Skoog	Detroit Red Wings	Florida Panthers	
July 1, 2026	Connor Mackey	Chicago Blackhawks	New York Rangers	
July 1, 2026	Domenick Fensore	Colorado Avalanche	Carolina Hurricanes	
July 1, 2026	John Beecher	Florida Panthers	Calgary Flames	
July 1, 2026	Sam Lafferty	Florida Panthers	Chicago Blackhawks	
July 1, 2026	Eduards Tralmaks	Edmonton Oilers	Detroit Red Wings	
July 1, 2026	Vinnie Hinostroza	Colorado Avalanche	Florida Panthers	
July 1, 2026	Laurent Brossoit	Anaheim Ducks	San Jose Sharks	
July 1, 2026	Ryan Shea	Edmonton Oilers	Pittsburgh Penguins	
July 1, 2026	Sammy Blais	Ottawa Senators	Montreal Canadiens	
July 1, 2026	Christian Kyrou	Ottawa Senators	Philadelphia Flyers	
July 1, 2026	Ryan Suzuki	Ottawa Senators	Carolina Hurricanes	
July 1, 2026	Philip Tomasino	Ottawa Senators	Philadelphia Flyers	
July 1, 2026	Michael Callahan	Tampa Bay Lightning	Boston Bruins	
July 1, 2026	Olivier Rodrigue	Tampa Bay Lightning	Chicago Blackhawks	
July 1, 2026	Mads Søgaard	Tampa Bay Lightning	Ottawa Senators	
July 1, 2026	James Hamblin	Anaheim Ducks	Edmonton Oilers	
July 1, 2026	Corey Schueneman	Anaheim Ducks	Washington Capitals	
July 1, 2026	Maxence Guénette	Boston Bruins	Philadelphia Flyers	
July 1, 2026	Brian Halonen	Boston Bruins	New Jersey Devils	
July 1, 2026	Jiří Patera	Boston Bruins	Vancouver Canucks	
July 1, 2026	Anders Lee	Utah Mammoth	New York Islanders	
July 1, 2026	Erik Gustafsson	Los Angeles Kings	Detroit Red Wings	
July 1, 2026	Jamie Oleksiak	Vancouver Canucks	Seattle Kraken	
July 1, 2026	Andreas Englund	Calgary Flames	Nashville Predators	
July 1, 2026	Ben Jones	Calgary Flames	Minnesota Wild	
July 1, 2026	Glenn Gawdin	New York Rangers	Los Angeles Kings	
July 1, 2026	Zac Jones	Utah Mammoth	Buffalo Sabres	
July 1, 2026	Mathieu Joseph	Edmonton Oilers	Los Angeles Kings	
July 1, 2026	Travis Mitchell	Anaheim Ducks	New York Islanders	
July 1, 2026	Boko Imama	Florida Panthers	Pittsburgh Penguins	
July 1, 2026	Alex Barré-Boulet	San Jose Sharks	Colorado Avalanche	
July 1, 2026	Mario Ferraro	Winnipeg Jets	San Jose Sharks	
July 1, 2026	Casey Fitzgerald	Florida Panthers	New York Rangers	
July 1, 2026	Frederik Andersen	Edmonton Oilers	Carolina Hurricanes	
July 1, 2026	Marc Gatcomb	Vegas Golden Knights	New York Islanders	
July 1, 2026	Adam Ginning	Vegas Golden Knights	Philadelphia Flyers	
July 1, 2026	Ville Heinola	Vegas Golden Knights	Winnipeg Jets	
July 1, 2026	Antti Tuomisto	Vegas Golden Knights	Detroit Red Wings	
July 1, 2026	Joel Kiviranta	Dallas Stars	Colorado Avalanche	
July 1, 2026	John Carlson	Tampa Bay Lightning	Anaheim Ducks	
July 1, 2026	Tye Felhaber	San Jose Sharks	Colorado Avalanche	
July 2, 2026	Dennis Cholowski	New York Rangers	New Jersey Devils	
July 2, 2026	Cole McWard	Toronto Maple Leafs	New York Islanders	
July 2, 2026	Henry Rybinski	Toronto Maple Leafs	Washington Capitals	
July 2, 2026	Matt Stienburg	Vancouver Canucks	Colorado Avalanche	
July 2, 2026	Brett Leason	San Jose Sharks	Washington Capitals	
July 2, 2026	Max Shabanov	Minnesota Wild	New York Islanders	
July 2, 2026	Henry Thrun	Winnipeg Jets	Toronto Maple Leafs	
July 2, 2026	David Rittich	New Jersey Devils	New York Islanders	
July 3, 2026	Samuel Hlavaj	Toronto Maple Leafs	Minnesota Wild	
July 3, 2026	Jansen Harkins	Tampa Bay Lightning	Anaheim Ducks	
July 3, 2026	Andrew Peeke	Utah Mammoth	Boston Bruins	
July 4, 2026	Matt Villalta	Buffalo Sabres	Utah Mammoth	
July 4, 2026	Chase Stillman	Detroit Red Wings	Vancouver Canucks	
July 4, 2026	Zach Sawchenko	Carolina Hurricanes	Columbus Blue Jackets	
July 5, 2026	Jacob MacDonald	Washington Capitals	Colorado Avalanche	
July 6, 2026	Colton White	Columbus Blue Jackets	New Jersey Devils	
July 6, 2026	Kyle Burroughs	Dallas Stars	Los Angeles Kings	
July 13, 2026	Ronnie Attard	Detroit Red Wings	Colorado Avalanche	
July 15, 2026	Anthony Mantha	New Jersey Devils	Pittsburgh Penguins	
July 20, 2026	Georgii Merkulov	Colorado Avalanche	Boston Bruins	
July 23, 2026	Patrick Kane	Chicago Blackhawks	Detroit Red Wings	
July 30, 2026	Colin White	New Jersey Devils	San Jose Sharks	
August 19, 2026	Nolan Foote	Philadelphia Flyers	Florida Panthers	
September 1, 2026	Eeli Tolvanen	New York Rangers	Seattle Kraken	
September 4, 2026	Brendan Brisson	Toronto Maple Leafs	New York Rangers	
September 8, 2026	P.O Joseph	Carolina Hurricanes	Vancouver Canucks	
September 12, 2026	Chris Kreider	Montreal Canadiens	Anaheim Ducks	
September 14, 2026	Cam Talbot	Columbus Blue Jackets	Detroit Red Wings	
September 20, 2026	Samu Salminen	Florida Panthers	New Jersey Devils	
September 25, 2026	Matt Grzelcyk	Buffalo Sabres	Chicago Blackhawks	
September 27, 2026	Logan Stanley	New York Islanders	Buffalo Sabres	
September 27, 2026	Nick Blankenburg	Toronto Maple Leafs	Colorado Avalanche	
September 27, 2026	Nathan Bastian	Florida Panthers	Dallas Stars	
September 29, 2026	Carson Soucy	Columbus Blue Jackets	New York Islanders	
October 6, 2026	Michael Bunting	Philadelphia Flyers	Dallas Stars	
October 16, 2026	David Perron	Dallas Stars	Detroit Red Wings	
October 22, 2026	Luke Glendening	New York Rangers	Philadelphia Flyers	
October 25, 2026	James Reimer	New York Rangers	Ottawa Senators	
November 5, 2026	Ben Hutton	New York Islanders	Vegas Golden Knights	

=== Offer sheets ===
An offer sheet is a contract offered to a restricted free agent by a team other than the one for which his rights are owned by. If the player signs the offer sheet, his current team has seven days to match the contract offer and keep the player or else he goes to the team that gave the offer sheet, with compensation going to his originally owning team.

Date offered	Player	Offering team	Original team	Contract offered (Note: Number displayed is the annual average value of the contract.)	Date resolved	Result	Compensation	Ref
July 1, 2026	Barrett Hayton	New Jersey Devils	Utah Mammoth	1 year $4,775,000	July 8, 2026	matched	n/a	
July 3, 2026	Leo Carlsson	Philadelphia Flyers	Anaheim Ducks	5 years $18,000,000	July 9, 2026	matched	n/a	

=== Imports ===
This section is for players who were not previously on contract with NHL teams in the past season. Listed is the last team and league they were under contract with.

Date	Player	New team	Previous team	League	Ref
July 1, 2026	Attilio Biasca (Note: Boston agreed to terms with Biasca on June 14, 2026 though the contract could not be registered until July 1, per CBA 50.8(d).)	Boston Bruins	HC Fribourg-Gotteron	NL	
July 1, 2026	Théo Rochette (Note: Detroit agreed to terms with Rochette on June 14, 2026 though the contract could not be registered until July 1, per CBA 50.8(d).)	Detroit Red Wings	Lausanne HC	NL	
July 1, 2026	Eskild Bakke Olsen (Note: Ottawa agreed to terms with Bakke Olsen on June 15, 2026 though the contract could not be registered until July 1, per CBA 50.8(d).)	Ottawa Senators	Linkoping HC	SHL	
July 1, 2026	Chase Wouters (Note: Vancouver agreed to terms with Wouters on June 17, 2026 though the contract could not be registered until July 1, per CBA 50.8(d).)	Vancouver Canucks	Abbotsford Canucks	AHL	
July 1, 2026	Atley Calvert	Pittsburgh Penguins	Wilkes-Barre/Scranton Penguins	AHL	
July 1, 2026	Artem Shlaine	Dallas Stars	Texas Stars	AHL	
July 1, 2026	Dylan Anhorn	Chicago Blackhawks	Manitoba Moose	AHL	
July 1, 2026	Riley Bezeau	Columbus Blue Jackets	Cleveland Monsters	AHL	
July 1, 2026	Dillon Dubé	St. Louis Blues	Springfield Thunderbirds	AHL	
July 1, 2026	Dylan Gambrell	Minnesota Wild	Iowa Wild	AHL	
July 1, 2026	Jagger Joshua	Minnesota Wild	Rochester Americans	AHL	
July 1, 2026	Philippe Daoust	Ottawa Senators	Belleville Senators	AHL	
July 1, 2026	Jake Livingstone	Calgary Flames	Charlotte Checkers	AHL	
July 1, 2026	Dillon Boucher	Chicago Blackhawks	Rockford IceHogs	AHL	
July 1, 2026	Connor Mylymok	Chicago Blackhawks	Rockford IceHogs	AHL	
July 2, 2026	Kyle Keyser	San Jose Sharks	Colorado Eagles	AHL	
July 2, 2026	Aidan McDonough	Buffalo Sabres	Wilkes-Barre/Scranton Penguins	AHL	
July 4, 2026	Christian Wolanin	Colorado Avalanche	Providence Bruins	AHL	
July 8, 2026	Libor Hájek	San Jose Sharks	HC Dynamo Pardubice	ELH	
July 8, 2026	Reilly Walsh	Montreal Canadiens	Barys Astana	KHL	
September 8, 2026	Ilya Samsonov	San Jose Sharks	HC Sochi	KHL	
September 9, 2026	Alex Formenton	Edmonton Oilers	HC Ambri-Piotta	NL	
September 25, 2026	Alex Nylander	Calgary Flames	Toronto Marlies	AHL	

== Trades ==
* Retained Salary Transaction - Each team is allowed up to three contracts on their payroll where they have retained salary in a trade (i.e. the player no longer plays with Team A due to a trade to Team B, but Team A still retains some salary). Only up to 50% of a player's contract can be kept, and only up to 15% of a team's salary cap can be taken up by retained salary. A contract can only be involved in one of these trades twice, and there must be a minimum of 75 days between the two trades.

=== July ===
July 1, 2026	To Dallas Stars 2nd-round pick in 2027; VGK 3rd-round pick in 2028	To Nashville Predators Mavrik Bourque; Ilya Lyubushkin
July 1, 2026	To Pittsburgh Penguins Nick Robertson	To Toronto Maple Leafs 4th-round pick in 2028
July 1, 2026	To Boston Bruins Kalle Väisänen; 4th-round pick in 2028	To New York Rangers Joonas Korpisalo
July 1, 2026	To Buffalo Sabres 3rd-round pick in 2028	To Edmonton Oilers Devon Levi; 7th-round pick in 2028
July 1, 2026	To Tampa Bay Lightning Dennis Hildeby; 4th-round pick in 2027; 3rd-round pick in 2028	To Toronto Maple Leafs Nick Paul
July 1, 2026	To Edmonton Oilers Shakir Mukhamadullin; Zack Sharp	To San Jose Sharks Darnell Nurse
July 1, 2026	To New York Rangers Cole Beaudoin; Sean Durzi conditional (Note: New York will receive the earlier of Toronto's or Utah's third-round picks in 2027.) TOR 3rd-round pick in 2027 or UTA 3rd-round pick in 2027	To Utah Mammoth Vincent Trocheck
July 1, 2026	To New York Rangers Marcus Pettersson	To Vancouver Canucks conditional (Note: Vancouver will receive New York's first-round pick in 2030 if it is outside of the top 10; otherwise, Vancouver will receive New York's first-round pick in 2031.) 1st-round pick in 2030 or 1st-round pick in 2031
July 1, 2026	To Boston Bruins Will Borgen	To New York Rangers 2nd-round pick in 2027 conditional (Note: New York will receive Boston's second-round pick in 2028 if Boston qualifies for the Eastern Conference Finals in either the 2027 or 2028 Stanley Cup Playoffs, and Borgen plays in 50% of Boston's playoff games; otherwise, New York will receive Boston's third-round pick in 2028.) 2nd-round pick in 2028 or 3rd-round pick in 2028
July 1, 2026	To Detroit Red Wings Keegan Kolesar	To Vegas Golden Knights 7th-round pick in 2027; 3rd-round pick in 2029
July 2, 2026	To Calgary Flames Jake Middleton; 3rd-round pick in 2027; 4th-round pick in 2028; 2nd-round pick in 2029	To Minnesota Wild Blake Coleman* (Note: Calgary retained 50% of Coleman's contract.); Olli Määttä
July 13, 2026	To Buffalo Sabres Zac Funk	To Washington Capitals Tyler Kopff
July 27, 2026	To Anaheim Ducks Sean Farrell	To Montreal Canadiens Sasha Pastujov

=== August ===
August 17, 2026	To Buffalo Sabres Future considerations (Note: Considerations unknown.)	To Carolina Hurricanes Stiven Sardarian
August 19, 2026	To Anaheim Ducks Cruz Lucius	To Pittsburgh Penguins Future considerations (Note: Considerations unknown.)
August 20, 2026	To Detroit Red Wings Sutter Muzzatti	To Nashville Predators Future considerations (Note: Considerations unknown.)

=== September ===
September 1, 2026	To Nashville Predators conditional (Note: Nashville will receive Colorado's first-round pick in 2028 if the pick is outside of the top ten selections and Colorado owns the pick at the time of the draft. Otherwise, Nashville will receive Colorado's first-round pick in 2029.) COL 1st-round pick in 2028 or COL 1st-round pick in 2029; 2nd-round pick in 2028	To New Jersey Devils Luke Evangelista
September 25, 2026	To Ottawa Senators Jonas Johansson	To Tampa Bay Lightning Future considerations (Note: Considerations unknown.)
September 28, 2026	To Columbus Blue Jackets Emil Andrae; Matthew Knies; Steven Lorentz conditional (Note: Columbus will receive the later of Columbus' or Winnipeg's second-round pick in 2027.) CBJ 2nd-round pick in 2027 or WPG 2nd-round pick in 2027	To Toronto Maple Leafs Kirill Marchenko; Elvis Merzļikins* (Note: Columbus retained 30% of Merlizkins' contract.); Miles Wood

=== October ===
October 1, 2026	To Philadelphia Flyers David Goyette	To Seattle Kraken Devin Kaplan
October 7, 2026	To Edmonton Oilers Filip Hållander	To Pittsburgh Penguins Spencer Stastney
October 9, 2026	To Nashville Predators Jayden Struble	To Montreal Canadiens VGK 2nd-round pick in 2027
October 12, 2026	To Buffalo Sabres Caleb Jones; Daniel Laatsch	To Pittsburgh Penguins Ryan Johnson
October 15, 2026	To Toronto Maple Leafs Aatu Räty	To Vancouver Canucks Brandon Buhr; Jacob Quillan
October 23, 2026	To New Jersey Devils Connor Hellebuyck	To Winnipeg Jets Nick Bjugstad; Alexander Command; Nico Daws; Dawson Mercer; 7th-round pick in 2027; 2nd-round pick in 2029

=== November ===
November 1, 2026	To New Jersey Devils 7th-round pick in 2027	To Washington Capitals Rémi Poirier
November 1, 2026	To Nashville Predators Shane Wright	To Seattle Kraken Matthew Wood
November 15, 2026	To Chicago Blackhawks Spencer Martin	To New York Rangers Arvid Söderblom
November 16, 2026	To Minnesota Wild Jérémy Davies	To Vegas Golden Knights future considerations (Note: Trade was completed when AHL forward Gerry Mayhew was traded from the Iowa Wild to the Henderson Silver Knights.)
November 20, 2026	To New York Rangers Max Sasson	To Vancouver Canucks 4th-round pick in 2029

== Waivers ==
Once an NHL player has played in a certain number of games or a set number of seasons has passed since the signing of his first NHL contract (see here), that player must be offered to all of the other NHL teams before he can be assigned to a minor league affiliate.

Date	Player	New team	Previous team	Ref
September 25, 2026	Leevi Meriläinen	Vancouver Canucks	Ottawa Senators	
September 26, 2026	Andreas Englund	Detroit Red Wings	Calgary Flames	
September 26, 2026	William Trudeau	Nashville Predators	New York Rangers	
September 27, 2026	Rémi Poirier	New Jersey Devils	Dallas Stars	
September 27, 2026	Justin Barron	St. Louis Blues	Nashville Predators	
September 28, 2026	Clay Stevenson	Winnipeg Jets	Washington Capitals	
October 24, 2026	Daemon Hunt	Nashville Predators	Minnesota Wild	
October 24, 2026	Jack St. Ivany	Washington Capitals	Winnipeg Jets	
October 29, 2026	Cameron Crotty	Minnesota Wild	Ottawa Senators	
November 9, 2026	Rémi Poirier	Dallas Stars	Washington Capitals	
November 10, 2026	Cameron Crotty	Vancouver Canucks	Minnesota Wild	
November 15, 2026	Mike Reilly	Colorado Avalanche	Carolina Hurricanes	
November 21, 2026	Clay Stevenson	Washington Capitals	Winnipeg Jets	

== See also ==
- 2026–27 NHL season
- 2026 NHL entry draft
- 2027 NHL entry draft
- 2026 in sports
- 2027 in sports
- 2025–26 NHL transactions
