= 2021–22 Cornell Big Red men's ice hockey season =

Collegiate ice hockey season

- Conference: 4th ECAC Hockey
- Home ice: Lynah Rink

Rankings
- USCHO: #18
- USA Today: NR

Record
- Overall: 18–10–4
- Conference: 12–6–4
- Home: 12–6–2
- Road: 5–4–2
- Neutral: 1–0–0

Coaches and captains
- Head coach: Mike Schafer
- Assistant coaches: Ben Syer; Sean Flanagan; Mitch Stephens
- Alternate captain(s): Kyle Betts; Cody Haiskanen; Brenden Locke

The 2021–22 Cornell Big Red Men's ice hockey season was the 105th season of play for the program. They represented Cornell University in the 2021–22 NCAA Division I men's ice hockey season and for the 60th season in the ECAC Hockey conference. They were coached by Mike Schafer, in his 26th season, and played their home games at Lynah Rink.

== Season ==
Cornell began its season very well, appearing to have no hangover from its lost year. The Big Red won 9 of its first 10 games and swiftly rose up the rankings, finding itself in the top 10 after the first half of the season. The only problem for Cornell at the time was the strength of its schedule. ECAC Hockey, as a whole, had a dreadful non-conference result and saw many of its teams finding a home at the bottom of the PairWise rankings. Because of that, Cornell had little room for error but, as long as it played consistently for the remainder of the year, the Big Red should be able to earn a tournament bid.

The team returned from its winter break and promptly tripled its loss total for the year. The road series against Arizona State also saw the end of the goaltender rotation between Joe Howe and Nate McDonald as neither had been very reliable over the first dozen games. Mike Schafer turned to freshman Ian Shane as the starter and the young goalie began with a marvelous start, helping the Big Red sweep top-5 North Dakota and look like a sure thing for the tournament.

Prior to the second game against the Fighting Hawks, Schafer tested positive for COVID-19 and was replaced on the bench by associate head coach Ben Syer. The head coach spend several weeks recovering from the virus but, towards the end of the battle, doctors discovered an issue with his circulatory system and found that Schafer needed a coronary stent. The news of their coach's health problem hit the team hard and Cornell went on a 6-game winless streak. The losses dropped the Big Red in the rankings and put them on the tournament bubble. Even after recovering towards the end of the regular season, the strength of schedule problem reared its head and stopped Cornell from being able to climb into the top-15 for the PairWise. Because of that, the team would have to have a strong performance in the conference tournament to have any chance at earning an at-large bid.

Schafer returned to the bench just in time for Cornell's first playoff game and the team responded with an inspired 3–1 win over Colgate. The Big Red continued to play well in the next two games but were stymied by a stellar goaltending performance by Mitch Benson and were knocked out in the quarterfinals. Despite being 8 games over .500, the losses ended Cornell's once promising season.

== Departures ==
Player	Position	Nationality	Cause
Matthew Galajda	Goaltender	Canada	Graduate transfer to Notre Dame
Joseph Leahy	Defenseman	Canada	Transferred to Vermont
Austin McGrath	Defenseman	United States	Graduation (retired)
Michael Regush	Forward	Canada	Transferred to Miami
Misha Song	Defenseman	China	Left Program (retired)

== Recruiting ==
Player	Position	Nationality	Age	Notes
Justin Ertel	Forward	Canada	18	Kitchener, ON; Selected 79th overall in 2021
Joe Howe	Goaltender	Canada	20	Barrie, ON
Hank Kempf	Defenseman	United States	19	Wilmette, IL; Selected 208th overall in 2021
Kyler Kovich	Forward	Canada	19	Coquitlam, BC
Sullivan Mack	Forward	United States	21	Anchorage, AK
Dan McIntyre	Forward	Canada	20	Almonte, ON
Ondřej Pšenička	Forward	Czech Republic	20	Prague, CZE
Jimmy Rayhill	Defenseman	United States	20	New Hartford, NY
Ian Shane	Goaltender	United States	21	Manhattan Beach, CA
Michael Suda	Defenseman	United States	19	Cheektowaga, NY

== Roster ==
As of August 19, 2021.

No.	Nat.	Player	Class	Pos	Height	Weight	DoB	Hometown	Previous team	NHL rights
2	(Canada)	Peter Muzyka	Junior	D	6' 3" (1.91 m)	190 lb (86 kg)	2000-05-14	Toronto, Ontario	New Mexico Ice Wolves (NAHL)	—
3	(United States)	Cody Haiskanen (A)	Graduate	D	6' 4" (1.93 m)	198 lb (90 kg)	1997-03-27	Fargo, North Dakota	Fargo Force (USHL)	—
4	(United States)	Hank Kempf	Freshman	D	6' 2" (1.88 m)	190 lb (86 kg)	2002-04-15	Wilmette, Illinois	Muskegon Lumberjacks (USHL)	NYR, 208th overall 2021
5	(Canada)	Sebastian Dirven	Junior	D	6' 3" (1.91 m)	196 lb (89 kg)	1998-06-22	Bainsville, Ontario	Central Illinois Flying Aces (USHL)	—
6	(Canada)	Kyler Kovich	Freshman	F	6' 2" (1.88 m)	181 lb (82 kg)	2002-01-31	Coquitlam, British Columbia	Tri-City Storm (USHL)	—
7	(United States)	Jimmy Rayhill	Freshman	D	5' 9" (1.75 m)	178 lb (81 kg)	2001-03-17	New Hartford, New York	Odessa Jackalopes (NAHL)	—
8	(United States)	Jack Lagerstrom	Sophomore	D	6' 2" (1.88 m)	185 lb (84 kg)	2000-03-30	Edina, Minnesota	Tri-City Storm (USHL)	—
9	(United States)	Jack O'Leary	Freshman	F	5' 7" (1.7 m)	160 lb (73 kg)	2000-03-28	St. James, New York	Lincoln Stars (USHL)	—
10	(United States)	Travis Mitchell	Junior	D	6' 3" (1.91 m)	205 lb (93 kg)	1999-11-25	South Lyon, Michigan	Omaha Lancers (USHL)	—
11	(Canada)	Kyle Betts (A)	Graduate	F	6' 1" (1.85 m)	177 lb (80 kg)	1997-09-17	Flesherton, Ontario	Powell River Kings (BCHL)	—
12	(United States)	Tim Rego	Freshman	D	6' 0" (1.83 m)	175 lb (79 kg)	2000-10-31	Mansfield, Massachusetts	Brooks Bandits (AJHL)	—
13	(United States)	Jack Malone	Junior	F	6' 1" (1.85 m)	190 lb (86 kg)	2000-10-13	Madison, New Jersey	Youngstown Phantoms (USHL)	VAN, 180th overall 2019
14	(Canada)	Ben Tupker	Junior	F	6' 3" (1.91 m)	191 lb (87 kg)	1999-12-23	Collingwood, Ontario	Carleton Place Canadians (CCHL)	—
15	(Russia)	Max Andreev	Senior	F	6' 0" (1.83 m)	184 lb (83 kg)	1998-10-22	Moscow, Russia	Central Illinois Flying Aces (USHL)	—
16	(Canada)	Dan McIntyre	Freshman	F	6' 1" (1.85 m)	185 lb (84 kg)	2000-11-22	Almonte, Ontario	Grande Prairie Storm (AJHL)	—
17	(Canada)	Zach Bramwell	Senior	F	6' 1" (1.85 m)	192 lb (87 kg)	1999-05-09	Hamilton, Ontario	Oakville Blades (OJHL)	—
18	(Canada)	Justin Ertel	Freshman	F	6' 2" (1.88 m)	187 lb (85 kg)	2003-05-27	Kitchener, Ontario	Summerside Western Capitals (MHL)	DAL, 79th overall 2021
19	(United States)	Sullivan Mack	Freshman	F	6' 1" (1.85 m)	181 lb (82 kg)	2000-07-05	Anchorage, Alaska	Salmon Arm Silverbacks (BCHL)	—
20	(Canada)	Matt Stienburg	Junior	F	6' 2" (1.88 m)	186 lb (84 kg)	2000-10-07	Halifax, Nova Scotia	St. Andrew's College (CISAA)	COL, 63rd overall 2019
21	(Canada)	Zach Tupker	Junior	F	6' 1" (1.85 m)	187 lb (85 kg)	1999-12-23	Collingwood, Ontario	Carleton Place Canadians (CCHL)	—
22	(Canada)	Kyle Penney	Freshman	F	6' 1" (1.85 m)	195 lb (88 kg)	2000-07-18	Lawrencetown, Nova Scotia	Chilliwack Chiefs (BCHL)	—
23	(Canada)	Liam Motley	Senior	F	6' 3" (1.91 m)	203 lb (92 kg)	1997-05-08	Calgary, Alberta	Whitecourt (AJHL)	—
24	(United States)	Sam Malinski	Junior	D	5' 11" (1.8 m)	190 lb (86 kg)	1998-07-27	Lakeville, Minnesota	Bismarck Bobcats (NAHL)	—
26	(Czech Republic)	Ondřej Pšenička	Freshman	F	6' 6" (1.98 m)	210 lb (95 kg)	2001-01-07	Prague, Czech Republic	Waterloo Black Hawks (USHL)	—
27	(United States)	Michael Suda	Freshman	D	6' 1" (1.85 m)	181 lb (82 kg)	2002-07-03	Cheektowaga, New York	Fargo Force (USHL)	—
28	(Canada)	Brenden Locke (A)	Graduate	F	5' 10" (1.78 m)	177 lb (80 kg)	1997-10-09	Iroquois Falls, Ontario	Cobourg Cougars (OJHL)	—
29	(Canada)	Ben Berard	Junior	F	6' 0" (1.83 m)	192 lb (87 kg)	1999-02-13	Duncan, British Columbia	Powell River Kings (BCHL)	—
30	(United States)	Ian Shane	Freshman	G	6' 0" (1.83 m)	170 lb (77 kg)	2000-09-24	Manhattan Beach, California	Bismarck Bobcats (USHL)	—
33	(Canada)	Nate McDonald	Senior	G	6' 2" (1.88 m)	181 lb (82 kg)	1999-08-11	North Bay, Ontario	Markham Royals (OJHL)	—
34	(Canada)	Joe Howe	Freshman	G	6' 2" (1.88 m)	190 lb (86 kg)	2001-06-04	Shanty Bay, Ontario	Grande Prairie Storm (AJHL)	—

== Standings ==
2021–22 ECAC Hockey Standings
	Conference record										Overall record					
	GP	W	L	T	OTW	OTL	3/SW	PTS	GF	GA	GP	W	L	T	GF	GA
#8 Quinnipiac †	22	17	4	1	0	1	1	54	71	14	42	32	7	3	139	53
#17 Clarkson	22	14	4	4	0	2	3	51	86	47	37	21	10	6	123	85
#15 Harvard *	22	14	6	2	0	0	2	46	69	46	35	21	11	3	116	82
Cornell	22	12	6	4	2	1	0	39	73	47	32	18	10	4	100	72
Colgate	22	9	9	4	1	0	3	33	55	57	40	18	18	4	111	112
Rensselaer	22	10	12	0	0	0	0	30	58	63	44	18	23	3	114	119
Union	22	9	11	2	3	1	0	27	52	66	37	14	19	4	89	110
St. Lawrence	22	7	10	5	2	0	2	26	44	60	37	11	19	7	72	110
Brown	22	6	12	4	0	1	2	25	36	61	31	7	20	4	50	100
Princeton	22	7	14	1	0	1	0	23	54	89	31	8	21	2	70	122
Yale	22	7	14	1	3	1	1	21	38	60	30	8	21	1	55	90
Dartmouth	22	5	15	2	0	3	1	21	45	71	32	7	22	3	69	110
Championship: March 19, 2022 † indicates conference regular season champion (Cleary Cup) * indicates conference tournament champion (Whitelaw Cup); Rankings: USCHO.com Top 20 Poll

== Schedule and results ==
Date	Time	Opponent^{#}	Rank^{#}	Site	TV	Decision	Result	Attendance	Record
Exhibition
October 16	7:00 PM	Princeton*	#15	Lynah Rink • Ithaca, New York (Exhibition)	ESPN+		W 5–0	1,500	—
October 23	7:00 PM	USNTDP*	#15	Lynah Rink • Ithaca, New York (Exhibition)	ESPN+		W 4–2	1,766	—
Regular season
October 29	7:00 PM	Alaska*	#16	Lynah Rink • Ithaca, New York	ESPN+	McDonald	W 3–2 ^{OT}	3,198	1–0–0
October 30	7:00 PM	Alaska*	#16	Lynah Rink • Ithaca, New York	ESPN+	Howe	W 1–0 ^{OT}	2,864	2–0–0
November 5	7:00 PM	at #13 Harvard	#15	Bright-Landry Hockey Center • Boston, Massachusetts (Rivalry)	ESPN+	Howe	L 2–3	3,095	2–1–0 (0–1–0)
November 6	7:00 PM	at Dartmouth	#15	Thompson Arena • Hanover, New Hampshire	ESPN+	McDonald	W 5–4	1,432	3–1–0 (1–1–0)
November 12	7:00 PM	Union	#13	Lynah Rink • Ithaca, New York	ESPN+	Howe	W 4–1	2,411	4–1–0 (2–1–0)
November 13	7:00 PM	Rensselaer	#13	Lynah Rink • Ithaca, New York	ESPN+	Howe	W 11–3	2,322	5–1–0 (3–1–0)
November 19	7:30 PM	Brown	#10	Lynah Rink • Ithaca, New York	ESPN+	McDonald	W 3–2 ^{OT}	2,362	6–1–0 (4–1–0)
November 20	7:00 PM	Yale	#10	Lynah Rink • Ithaca, New York	ESPN+	McDonald	W 3–0	3,448	7–1–0 (5–1–0)
November 27	8:00 PM	vs. Boston University*	#10	Madison Square Garden • New York, New York (Red Hot Hockey)	ESPN+	Howe	W 6–4	13,160	8–1–0
December 3	7:00 PM	at St. Lawrence	#9	Appleton Arena • Canton, New York	ESPN+	McDonald	W 4–1	1,256	9–1–0 (6–1–0)
December 4	7:00 PM	at #19 Clarkson	#9	Cheel Arena • Potsdam, New York	ESPN+	McDonald	T 4–4 ^{SOL}	2,792	9–1–1 (6–1–1)
January 1	9:07 PM	at Arizona State*	#9	Oceanside Ice Arena • Tempe, Arizona		Howe	L 2–5		9–2–1
January 2	9:07 PM	at Arizona State*	#9	Oceanside Ice Arena • Tempe, Arizona		McDonald	L 2–3	900	9–3–1
January 7	8:07 PM	at #5 North Dakota*	#14	Ralph Engelstad Arena • Grand Forks, North Dakota	NCHC.tv	Shane	W 4–3	10,128	10–3–1
January 8	7:07 PM	at #5 North Dakota*	#14	Ralph Engelstad Arena • Grand Forks, North Dakota	NCHC.tv	Shane	W 3–1	11,192	11–3–1
January 15	7:00 PM	Yale	#9	Ingalls Rink • New Haven, Connecticut	ESPN+	Shane	W 3–0	-	12–3–1 (7–1–1)
January 21	7:00 PM	Princeton	#8	Lynah Rink • Ithaca, New York	ESPN+	Shane	L 4–5	2,133	12–4–1 (7–2–1)
January 22	7:00 PM	#1 Quinnipiac	#8	Lynah Rink • Ithaca, New York	ESPN+	Shane	W 2–1 ^{OT}	2,133	13–4–1 (8–2–1)
January 28	7:00 PM	Dartmouth	#8	Lynah Rink • Ithaca, New York	ESPN+	Shane	T 2–2 ^{SOL}	2,133	13–4–2 (8–2–2)
January 29	7:00 PM	Harvard	#8	Lynah Rink • Ithaca, New York (Rivalry)	ESPN+	Shane	T 2–2 ^{SOL}	2,133	13–4–3 (8–2–3)
February 1	7:00 PM	Brown	#11	Meehan Auditorium • Providence, Rhode Island	ESPN+	Shane	L 1–2	262	13–5–3 (8–3–3)
February 4	7:30 PM	Colgate	#11	Class of 1965 Arena • Hamilton, New York	ESPN+	Shane	L 2–3	1,292	13–6–3 (8–4–3)
February 5	7:00 PM	at Colgate	#11	Lynah Rink • Ithaca, New York	ESPN+	Shane	T 2–2 ^{SOL}	3,201	13–6–4 (8–4–4)
February 11	7:00 PM	at Rensselaer	#16	Houston Field House • Troy, New York	ESPN+	Howe	L 2–6	200	13–7–4 (8–5–4)
February 12	7:00 PM	at Union	#16	Achilles Rink • Schenectady, New York	ESPN+	McDonald	W 5–2	1,721	14–7–4 (9–5–4)
February 18	7:00 PM	St. Lawrence	#18	Lynah Rink • Ithaca, New York	ESPN+	Shane	L 1–2	3,577	14–8–4 (9–6–4)
February 19	7:00 PM	#15 Clarkson	#18	Lynah Rink • Ithaca, New York	ESPN+	McDonald	W 5–2	3,918	15–8–4 (10–6–4)
February 25	7:00 PM	at #5 Quinnipiac	#18	People's United Center • Hamden, Connecticut	ESPN+	Shane	W 1–0	3,027	16–8–4 (11–6–4)
February 26	7:00 PM	at Princeton	#18	Hobey Baker Memorial Rink • Princeton, New Jersey	ESPN+	Shane	W 4–0	2,035	17–8–4 (12–6–4)
ECAC Hockey Tournament
March 11	7:00 PM	Colgate*	#18	Lynah Rink • Ithaca, New York (Quarterfinal game 1)		Shane	W 3–1	3,550	18–8–4
March 12	7:00 PM	Colgate*	#18	Lynah Rink • Ithaca, New York (Quarterfinal game 2)		Shane	L 2–4	4,034	18–9–4
March 13	4:00 PM	Colgate*	#18	Lynah Rink • Ithaca, New York (Quarterfinal game 3)		Shane	L 1–2	2,735	18–10–4
Cornell Lost Series 1–2
*Non-conference game. ^{#}Rankings from USCHO.com Poll. All times are in Eastern Time. Source:

== Scoring statistics ==
Name	Position	Games	Goals	Assists	Points	PIM
Matt Stienburg	C	28	13	16	29	30
Benjamin Berard	C	26	14	9	23	6
Max Andreev	F	22	9	14	23	23
Sam Malinski	D	32	5	18	23	26
Ondřej Pšenička	RW	32	12	9	21	18
Jack Malone	RW/C	32	8	12	20	26
Brenden Locke	C	32	6	12	18	16
Kyle Betts	C	32	6	12	18	34
Travis Mitchell	D	32	3	13	16	40
Kyle Penney	C	32	8	6	14	8
Tim Rego	D	32	2	9	11	6
Justin Ertel	D	23	1	8	9	10
Hank Kempf	C/RW	32	0	8	8	6
Ben Tupker	LW	26	3	4	7	6
Zach Tupker	C	32	1	6	7	8
Cody Haiskanen	D	30	1	5	6	14
Sebastian Dirven	D	31	1	5	6	33
Kyler Kovich	LW	19	3	1	4	8
Liam Motley	F	21	2	1	3	19
Jack O'Leary	F	11	1	1	2	19
Sullivan Mack	F	20	1	1	2	4
Zach Bramwell	F	4	0	0	0	0
Michael Suda	D	6	0	0	0	0
Peter Muzyka	D	6	0	0	0	15
Jack Lagerstrom	D	14	0	0	0	4
Joe Howe	G	8	0	0	0	0
Nate McDonald	G	9	0	0	0	0
Ian Shane	G	17	0	0	0	0
Bench	-	-	-	-	-	12
Total			100	170	270	391

== Goaltending statistics ==
Name	Games	Minutes	Wins	Losses	Ties	Goals against	Saves	Shut outs	SV %	GAA
Ian Shane	17	979	7	6	3	28	387	3	.933	1.72
Nate McDonald	9	504	7	1	1	20	189	1	.904	2.38
Joe Howe	8	443	4	3	0	19	157	1	.892	2.57
Empty Net	-	23	-	-	-	5	-	-	-	-
Total	32	1950	18	10	4	72	733	5	.911	2.22

== Rankings ==
Poll	Week																									
Poll	Pre	1	2	3	4	5	6	7	8	9	10	11	12	13	14	15	16	17	18	19	20	21	22	23	24	25 (Final)
USCHO.com	15	16	15	15	16	15	13	10	10	9	9	9	14	9	8	8	11	16	18	18	17	18	NR	NR	-	NR
USA Today	13	NR	13	15	15	14	12	9	10	9	9	9	14	10	8	9	13	15	NR	NR	NR	NR	NR	NR	NR	NR

Note: USCHO did not release a poll in week 24.

== Awards and honors ==
Player	Award	Ref
Sam Malinski	ECAC Hockey First Team	
Matt Stienburg	ECAC Hockey Second Team	
Max Andreev	ECAC Hockey Third Team	
Hank Kempf	ECAC Hockey Rookie Team	

== Players drafted into the NHL ==
=== 2022 NHL entry draft ===
Round	Pick	Player	NHL team
3	83	George Fegaras^{†}	Dallas Stars
6	182	Luke Devlin^{†}	Pittsburgh Penguins

† incoming freshman
