= 2018–19 Yale Bulldogs men's ice hockey season =

College ice hockey season

- Conference: T–5th ECAC Hockey
- Home ice: Ingalls Rink

Rankings
- USCHO: NR
- USA Today: NR

Record
- Overall: 15–15–3
- Conference: 11–10–1
- Home: 9–5–1
- Road: 5–9–1
- Neutral: 1–1–1

Coaches and captains
- Head coach: Keith Allain
- Assistant coaches: Josh Siembida; Ryan Donald
- Captain: Anthony Walsh

The 2018–19 Yale Bulldogs Men's ice hockey season was the 124th season of play for the program and the 58th season in the ECAC Hockey conference. The Bulldogs represented Yale University and were coached by Keith Allain, in his 13th season.

== Season ==
Yale began the season well, rising up their conference standings and earning a top-20 ranking after a 5-game winning streak. The Bulldogs would slowly drop out of the rankings with several up and down weeks but looked like they had recovered some of their early season success after defeating #8 Cornell. After that match, however, Yale lost its final 4 games of the regular season and missed a chance to earn a first-round bye for the ECAC Tournament.

The Bulldogs took care of Rensselaer fairly easily, however, in the quarterfinals they were defeated by Clarkson and ended the season with a .500 record.

During the year, goaltenders Sam Tucker and Corbin Kaczperski shared the net. They produced similar numbers and had roughly equal success in net.

== Departures ==
Player	Position	Nationality	Cause
John Baiocco	Forward	United States	Graduation (Retired)
Ryan Hitchcock	Forward	United States	Graduation (signed with Bridgeport Sound Tigers)
Adam Larkin	Defenseman	United States	Graduation (signed with Adirondack Thunder)
J.M. Piotrowski	Forward	United States	Signed Professional Contract (Australia)

== Recruiting ==
Player	Position	Nationality	Age
Curtis Hall	Center	United States	18
Kyle Johnson	Forward	Canada	20
Graham Lillibridge	Defenseman	United States	19
Justin Pearson	Forward	United States	20
Jack St. Ivany	Defenseman	United States	19

== Roster ==
No.	Nat.	Player	Class	Pos	Height	Weight	DoB	Hometown	Previous team	NHL rights
1	(United States)	Sam Tucker	Senior	G	6' 2" (1.88 m)	180 lb (82 kg)	1996-04-16	Wilton, Connecticut	Choate Rosemary Hall (US-Prep)	—
2	(United States)	Jack St. Ivany	Freshman	D	6' 2" (1.88 m)	195 lb (88 kg)	1999-07-22	Manhattan Beach, California	Sioux Falls Stampede (USHL)	PHI, 112th overall 2018
3	(United States)	Charlie Curti	Senior	D	6' 0" (1.83 m)	192 lb (87 kg)	1996-05-04	Mound, Minnesota	Cedar Rapids RoughRiders (USHL)	—
4	(United States)	Matt Foley	Junior	D	6' 1" (1.85 m)	198 lb (90 kg)	1995-04-20	Longmeadow, Massachusetts	Bloomington Thunder (USHL)	—
5	(United States)	Brian Matthews	Sophomore	D	6' 0" (1.83 m)	195 lb (88 kg)	1998-04-21	Marshfield, Massachusetts	Omaha Lancers (USHL)	—
6	(United States)	Billy Sweezey	Junior	D	6' 2" (1.88 m)	204 lb (93 kg)	1996-02-06	Hanson, Massachusetts	Chicago Steel (USHL)	—
7	(United States)	Joe Snively	Senior	C	5' 9" (1.75 m)	165 lb (75 kg)	1996-01-01	Herndon, Virginia	Sioux City Musketeers (USHL)	—
8	(United States)	Will D'Orsi	Junior	F	5' 11" (1.8 m)	180 lb (82 kg)	1997-01-07	Sudbury, Massachusetts	Lincoln Stars (USHL)	—
9	(Canada)	Robbie DeMontis	Junior	F	5' 9" (1.75 m)	170 lb (77 kg)	1996-02-17	Kleinburg, Ontario	Muskegon Lumberjacks (USHL)	—
10	(United States)	Chandler Lindstrand	Junior	D	6' 0" (1.83 m)	195 lb (88 kg)	1996-02-21	Medina, Minnesota	Des Moines Buccaneers (USHL)	—
11	(United States)	Andrew Gaus	Senior (RS)	F	6' 0" (1.83 m)	185 lb (84 kg)	1995-02-23	Wexford, Pennsylvania	Cedar Rapids RoughRiders (USHL)	—
12	(United States)	Dante Palecco	Sophomore	F	5' 11" (1.8 m)	185 lb (84 kg)	1998-04-18	Whippany, New Jersey	Green Bay Gamblers (USHL)	—
13	(Canada)	Evan Smith	Junior	F	6' 0" (1.83 m)	190 lb (86 kg)	1996-08-28	Stouffville, Ontario	Dubuque Fighting Saints (USHL)	—
14	(Canada)	Mitchell Smith	Junior	F	5' 11" (1.8 m)	185 lb (84 kg)	1996-08-28	Stouffville, Ontario	Dubuque Fighting Saints (USHL)	—
15	(Canada)	Kyle Johnson	Freshman	F	5' 11" (1.8 m)	180 lb (82 kg)	1998-06-03	Port Moody, British Columbia	Prince George Spruce Kings (BCHL)	—
16	(United States)	Anthony Walsh (C)	Senior	D	5' 10" (1.78 m)	180 lb (82 kg)	1999-12-30	Burr Ridge, Illinois	Sioux City Musketeers (USHL)	—
17	(United States)	Kevin O'Neil	Sophomore	F	5' 11" (1.8 m)	175 lb (79 kg)	1998-02-23	Latham, New York	Madison Capitols (USHL)	—
18	(United States)	Justin Pearson	Freshman	F	6' 1" (1.85 m)	185 lb (84 kg)	1998-05-17	Nashua, New Hampshire	Islanders Hockey Club (NCDC)	—
19	(United States)	Ted Hart	Senior	F	6' 1" (1.85 m)	185 lb (84 kg)	1996-02-20	Cumberland, Maine	Phillips Exeter Academy (US-Prep)	—
20	(United States)	Curtis Hall	Freshman	F	6' 3" (1.91 m)	197 lb (89 kg)	2000-04-26	Chagrin Falls, Ohio	Youngstown Phantoms (USHL)	BOS, 119th overall 2018
21	(Canada)	Tyler Welsh	Sophomore	F	5' 9" (1.75 m)	165 lb (75 kg)	1997-03-17	Whistler, British Columbia	Victoria Grizzlies (BCHL)	—
24	(United States)	Graham Lillibridge	Freshman	D	5' 9" (1.75 m)	160 lb (73 kg)	1999-01-29	Geneva, Illinois	Chicago Steel (USHL)	—
25	(United States)	Phil Kemp	Sophomore	D	6' 3" (1.91 m)	200 lb (91 kg)	1999-02-12	Greenwich, Connecticut	USNTDP (USHL)	EDM, 208th overall 2017
26	(Canada)	Brett Jewell	Sophomore	F	6' 2" (1.88 m)	195 lb (88 kg)	1996-11-09	Vernon, British Columbia	Merritt Centennials (BCHL)	—
27	(United States)	Luke Stevens	Junior	F	6' 4" (1.93 m)	212 lb (96 kg)	1997-02-11	Duxbury, Massachusetts	Noble & Greenough School (USHS–MA)	CAR, 126th overall 2015
33	(United States)	Corbin Kaczperski	Junior (RS)	G	6' 3" (1.91 m)	185 lb (84 kg)	1996-03-02	China Township, Michigan	Lone Star Brahmas (NAHL)	—

== Standings ==
2018–19 ECAC Hockey Standings
	Conference record							Overall record					
	GP	W	L	T	PTS	GF	GA	GP	W	L	T	GF	GA
#7 Quinnipiac†	22	14	6	2	30	77	47	38	26	10	2	133	73
#8 Cornell†	22	13	5	4	30	64	41	36	21	11	4	108	73
#11 Clarkson*	22	13	7	2	28	65	42	39	26	11	2	122	78
#14 Harvard	22	13	7	2	28	77	58	33	19	11	3	106	83
Dartmouth	22	10	9	3	23	53	55	34	13	17	4	87	93
Yale	22	11	10	1	23	53	57	33	15	15	3	85	88
Union	22	10	10	2	22	60	64	39	20	13	6	112	102
Brown	22	8	9	5	21	52	59	34	15	14	5	89	97
Princeton	22	8	12	2	18	60	66	31	10	18	3	83	96
Colgate	22	7	12	3	17	43	64	36	10	23	3	55	111
Rensselaer	22	7	13	2	16	49	67	36	10	23	3	69	117
St. Lawrence	22	3	17	2	8	51	84	37	6	29	2	75	149
Championship: March 23, 2019 † indicates conference regular season champion (Cleary Cup) * indicates conference tournament champion (Whitelaw Cup); Rankings: USCHO.com Top 20 Poll

== Schedule and results ==
Date	Time	Opponent^{#}	Rank^{#}	Site	TV	Decision	Result	Attendance	Record
Regular season
October 26	7:00 PM	at Brown		Meehan Auditorium • Providence, Rhode Island		Kaczperski	W 3–2	709	1–0–0 (1–0–0)
November 2	7:00 PM	at #18 Cornell		Lynah Rink • Ithaca, New York		Kaczperski	L 2–4	3,882	1–1–0 (1–1–0)
November 3	7:00 PM	at Colgate		Class of 1965 Arena • Hamilton, New York		Tucker	W 4–2	1,507	2–1–0 (2–1–0)
November 9	7:00 PM	vs. Harvard		Ingalls Rink • New Haven, Connecticut		Kaczperski	T 3–3 ^{OT}	3,500	2–1–1 (2–1–1)
November 10	7:00 PM	vs. Dartmouth		Ingalls Rink • New Haven, Connecticut		Tucker	L 0–3	3,245	2–2–1 (2–2–1)
Friendship Four
November 23	10:00 AM	vs. #11 Union*		SSE Arena Belfast • Belfast, Northern Ireland (Friendship Four Semifinal)		Kaczperski	T 1–1 ^{SOL}	5,812	2–2–2
November 24	10:00 AM	vs. Connecticut*		SSE Arena Belfast • Belfast, Northern Ireland (Friendship Four Third Place)	NESN+	Tucker	W 6–2	6,224	3–2–2
November 30	7:00 PM	at St. Lawrence		Appleton Arena • Canton, New York		Kaczperski	W 5–3	1,052	4–2–2 (3–2–1)
December 1	7:00 PM	at #17 Clarkson		Cheel Arena • Potsdam, New York		Tucker	W 2–1	2,543	5–2–2 (4–2–1)
December 7	7:00 PM	vs. Rensselaer		Ingalls Rink • New Haven, Connecticut		Kaczperski	W 4–2	2,713	6–2–2 (5–2–1)
December 8	7:00 PM	vs. Union		Ingalls Rink • New Haven, Connecticut		Tucker	W 3–0	3,329	7–2–2 (6–2–1)
December 11	7:00 PM	at #2 Massachuettts*	#18	Mullins Center • Amherst, Massachusetts	NESN+	Kaczperski	L 2–5	4,587	7–3–2
December 29	7:00 PM	vs. McGill*	#18	Ingalls Rink • New Haven, Connecticut (Exhibition)		Tucker	W 5–2	2,255	
December 31	4:15 PM	vs. Connecticut*	#18	Ingalls Rink • New Haven, Connecticut		Tucker	L 1–3	3,500	7–4–2
January 5	7:00 PM	at New Hampshire*	#18	Whittemore Center • Durham, New Hampshire		Kaczperski	T 5–5 ^{OT}	4,004	7–4–3
January 7	7:00 PM	vs. Maine*	#19	Cross Insurance Arena • Portland, Maine		Tucker	L 3–4 ^{OT}	4,304	7–5–3
January 12	7:00 PM	vs. Sacred Heart*	#19	Ingalls Rink • New Haven, Connecticut		Kaczperski	W 3–1	3,156	8–5–3
January 18	7:00 PM	vs. #14 Clarkson	#19	Ingalls Rink • New Haven, Connecticut		Kaczperski	L 2–4	3,234	8–6–3 (6–3–1)
January 19	7:00 PM	vs. St. Lawrence	#19	Ingalls Rink • New Haven, Connecticut		Tucker	W 3–2	3,150	9–6–3 (7–3–1)
January 25	7:00 PM	at Union	#20	Achilles Rink • Schenectady, New York		Tucker	L 3–4 ^{OT}	1,791	9–7–3 (7–4–1)
January 26	7:00 PM	at Rensselaer	#20	Houston Field House • Troy, New York		Kaczperski	W 3–2	4,179	10–7–3 (8–4–1)
February 2	7:00 PM	at Brown		Ingalls Rink • New Haven, Connecticut		Kaczperski	W 4–3	3,500	11–7–3 (9–4–1)
February 8	7:05 PM	at #4 Quinnipiac		People's United Center • Hamden, Connecticut		Kaczperski	L 0–4	3,625	11–8–3 (9–5–1)
February 9	7:00 PM	vs. Princeton		Hobey Baker Memorial Rink • Princeton, New Jersey		Tucker	L 1–4	2,300	11–9–3 (9–6–1)
February 14	7:00 PM	vs. Colgate		Ingalls Rink • New Haven, Connecticut		Kaczperski	W 3–0	3,178	12–9–3 (10–6–1)
February 16	7:00 PM	vs. #8 Cornell		Ingalls Rink • New Haven, Connecticut		Tucker	W 5–2	3,500	13–9–3 (11–6–1)
February 22	7:02 PM	at Dartmouth		Thompson Arena • Hanover, New Hampshire		Kaczperski	L 0–2	2,222	13–10–3 (11–7–1)
February 23	7:00 PM	at #17 Harvard		Bright-Landry Hockey Center • Boston, Massachusetts		Tucker	L 0–3	3,095	13–11–3 (11–8–1)
March 1	7:00 PM	vs. Princeton		Ingalls Rink • New Haven, Connecticut		Kaczperski	L 2–3	3,225	13–12–3 (11–9–1)
March 2	7:00 PM	vs. #5 Quinnipiac		Ingalls Rink • New Haven, Connecticut		Tucker	L 1–4	3,500	13–13–3 (11–9–1)
ECAC Hockey Tournament
March 8	7:00 PM	vs. Rensselaer*		Ingalls Rink • New Haven, Connecticut (First Round Game 1)		Kaczperski	W 4–1	1,444	14–13–3
March 9	7:00 PM	vs. Rensselaer*		Ingalls Rink • New Haven, Connecticut (First Round Game 2)		Tucker	W 4–0	1,521	15–13–3
Yale Won Series 2–0
March 15	7:00 PM	vs. #11 Clarkson*		Cheel Arena • Potsdam, New York (Quarterfinal Game 1)		Tucker	L 1–3	2,112	15–14–3
March 16	7:00 PM	vs. #11 Clarkson*		Cheel Arena • Potsdam, New York (Quarterfinal Game 2)		Tucker	L 2–5	2,301	15–15–3
Yale Lost Series 0–2
*Non-conference game. ^{#}Rankings from USCHO.com Poll. All times are in Eastern Time.

== Scoring statistics ==
Name	Position	Games	Goals	Assists	Points	PIM
Joe Snivley	LW	33	15	21	36	17
Robbie DeMontis	LW	28	7	11	18	4
Justin Pearson	F	33	6	11	17	18
Kevin O'Neil	RW	31	5	11	16	10
Evan Smith	C/LW	32	5	10	15	35
Jack St. Ivany	D	30	6	8	14	20
Curtis Hall	C	24	5	6	11	16
Mitchell Smith	LW	30	5	6	11	6
Chandler Lindstrand	D	27	2	9	11	6
Tyler Welsh	F	33	2	9	11	14
Ted Heart	C/RW	32	4	5	9	4
Andrew Gaus	RW	30	2	7	9	10
Charlie Curti	D	30	3	5	8	6
Phil Kemp	D	30	3	5	8	35
Luke Stevens	LW	23	4	3	7	19
Anthony Walsh	D/F	28	4	2	6	33
Dante Palecco	LW	33	3	2	5	18
Billy Sweezey	D	32	1	4	5	26
Graham Lillibridge	D	26	1	2	3	8
Matt Foley	D	18	1	1	2	2
Brett Jewell	RW	24	1	1	2	16
Will D'Orsi	C	9	0	1	1	0
Kyle Johnson	F	10	0	1	1	0
Brian Matthews	D	1	0	0	0	0
Corbin Kaczperski	G	16	0	0	0	2
Sam Tucker	G	19	0	0	0	0
Bench	-	33	-	-	-	2
Total			85	141	226	327

== Goaltending statistics ==
Name	Games	Minutes	Wins	Losses	Ties	Goals against	Saves	Shut outs	SV %	GAA
Corbin Kaczperski	16	921	8	5	2	38	412	1	.908	2.47
Sam Tucker	19	1066	7	10	1	45	539	2	.917	2.53
Empty Net	-	12	-	-	-	5	-	-	-	-
Total	33	2001	15	15	3	88	956	3	.908	2.64

== Rankings ==
Poll	Week																										
Poll	Pre	1	2	3	4	5	6	7	8	9	10	11	12	13	14	15	16	17	18	19	20	21	22	23	24	25	26 (Final)
USCHO.com	NR	NR	NR	NR	NR	NR	NR	NR	NR	NR	18	–	–	19	19	20	NR	NR	NR	NR	NR	NR	NR	NR	NR	–	NR
USA Today	NR	NR	NR	NR	NR	NR	NR	NR	NR	NR	NR	NR	NR	NR	NR	NR	NR	NR	NR	NR	NR	NR	NR	NR	NR	NR	NR

== Awards and honors ==
=== ECAC Hockey ===
Honor	Player	Position
All-ECAC Hockey First Team	Joe Snivley	Forward

== Players drafted into the NHL ==
=== 2019 NHL entry draft ===
No Yale players were selected in the NHL draft.
