= Jeff Mitchell (ice hockey) =

American ice hockey player (born 1975)

- Born: May 16, 1975 (age 50) Wayne, Michigan, U.S.
- Height: 5 ft 11 in (180 cm)
- Weight: 200 lb (91 kg; 14 st 4 lb)
- Position: Right wing
- Shot: Right
- Played for: Dallas Stars
- National team: United States
- NHL draft: 68th overall, 1993; Los Angeles Kings
- Playing career: 1995–2004

Jeff Mitchell (born May 16, 1975) is an American former professional ice hockey right winger who played seven games in the National Hockey League (NHL) for the Dallas Stars. As a youth, he played in the 1989 Quebec International Pee-Wee Hockey Tournament with the Detroit Little Caesars minor ice hockey team.

His son, Travis Mitchell, is an ice hockey defenseman with the New York Islanders.

== Career statistics ==
			Regular season					Playoffs
Season	Team	League	GP	G	A	Pts	PIM	GP	G	A	Pts	PIM
1990–91	Fruehauf Flyers	MNHL	62	52	63	115	196	—	—	—	—	—
1991–92	Detroit Falcons	MNHL	65	65	52	117	114	—	—	—	—	—
1992–93	Detroit Junior Red Wings	OHL	62	10	15	25	100	15	3	3	6	16
1993–94	Detroit Junior Red Wings	OHL	59	25	18	43	99	17	3	5	8	22
1994–95	Detroit Junior Red Wings	OHL	61	30	30	60	121	21	9	12	21	48
1995–96	Michigan K-Wings	IHL	50	5	4	9	119	—	—	—	—	—
1996–97	Michigan K-Wings	IHL	24	0	3	3	40	—	—	—	—	—
1996–97	Philadelphia Phantoms	AHL	31	7	5	12	103	10	1	1	2	20
1997–98	Dallas Stars	NHL	7	0	0	0	7	—	—	—	—	—
1997–98	Michigan K-Wings	IHL	62	9	8	17	206	4	0	0	0	30
1998–99	Michigan K-Wings	IHL	50	4	4	8	122	2	0	0	0	0
1999–00	Cincinnati Mighty Ducks	AHL	20	0	3	3	16	—	—	—	—	—
1999–00	Cincinnati Cyclones	IHL	1	0	0	0	0	—	—	—	—	—
1999–00	Dayton Bombers	ECHL	36	23	17	40	186	—	—	—	—	—
2000–01	Dayton Bombers	ECHL	56	21	35	56	236	8	4	4	8	18
2001–02	Saint John Flames	AHL	64	7	3	10	84	—	—	—	—	—
2001–02	Toledo Storm	ECHL	6	3	3	6	21	—	—	—	—	—
2002–03	Toledo Storm	ECHL	57	10	19	29	184	7	3	1	4	37
2003–04	Toledo Storm	ECHL	4	0	3	3	10	—	—	—	—	—
NHL totals			7	0	0	0	7	—	—	—	—	—
AHL totals			115	14	11	25	203	10	1	1	2	20
ECHL totals			159	57	77	134	637	15	7	5	12	55
