= Matthew Galajda =

Canadian ice hockey player

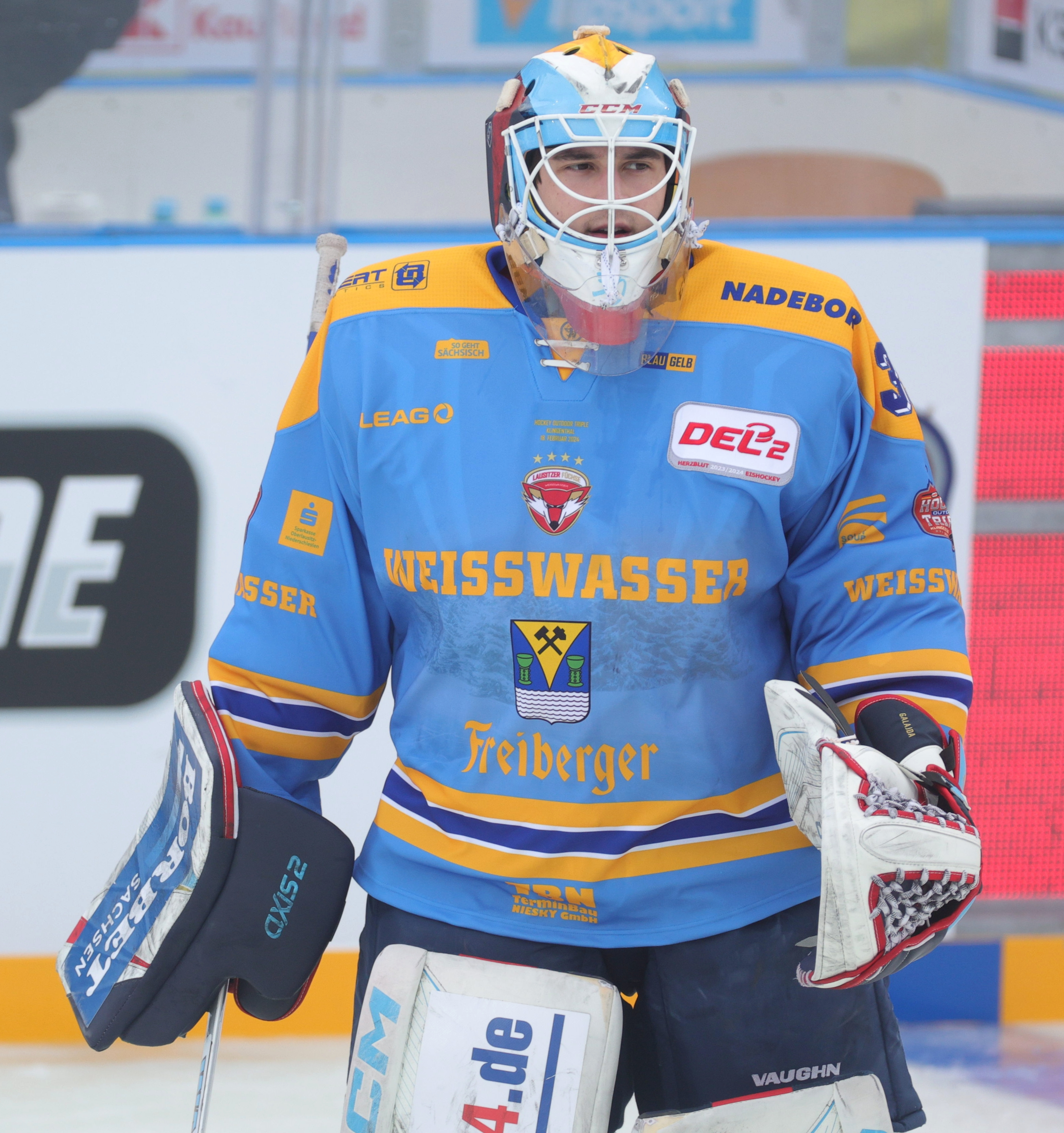
- Galajda with Lausitzer Füchse in 2024
- Born: October 7, 1997 (age 28) Aurora, Ontario, Canada
- Height: 6 ft 0 in (183 cm)
- Weight: 207 lb (94 kg; 14 st 11 lb)
- Position: Goaltender
- Shot: Right
- Allsv team: Djurgårdens IF
- NHL draft: Undrafted
- Playing career: 2022–2024

Matthew David Galajda (born October 7, 1997) is a Canadian professional ice hockey goaltender for Djurgårdens IF in the HockeyAllsvenskan (Allsv).

== Early life ==
Galajda was born on October 7, 1997, in Aurora, Ontario, Canada to parents David and Veronica. His father is the director of residential life at St. Andrew's College, Aurora, and Galajda and his sister grew up on campus.

== Playing career ==
=== Junior ===
At the age of 15, after finishing the 2012–13 season with the Midget AAA Markham Waxers, Galajda remained undrafted by the Ontario Hockey League (OHL). Following this, he was encouraged by his goalie coach, David Belitski, to enroll at St. Andrew's College and earn an NCAA scholarship for a Division 1 team. Galajda subsequently played for the St. Andrew's College Saints for two seasons where he posted a 56–6–4 record, .941 save percentage, and 1.3 goals against average. Through his efforts, the Saints won back-to-back CISAA championships, the World Sport School Championship, and two St. Sebastian Tournament Championships. Prior to leaving the St. Andrew's for the British Columbia Hockey League (BCHL), he was also named the MVP of the National Tournament and the Varsity Hockey Team.

During his rookie season with the Victoria Grizzlies, Galajda was named the team's Rookie of the Year and competed with Team Canada West at the World Junior A Challenge. The following year, he posted 2.33 goals-against average and .926 save percentage through 40 regular-season games and was subsequently named the BCHL Island Division's Most Valuable Player. During his second season with the Victoria Grizzlies, Galajda accepted an NCAA Division I scholarship to play collegiate ice hockey with the Cornell Big Red men's ice hockey team.

=== Collegiate ===
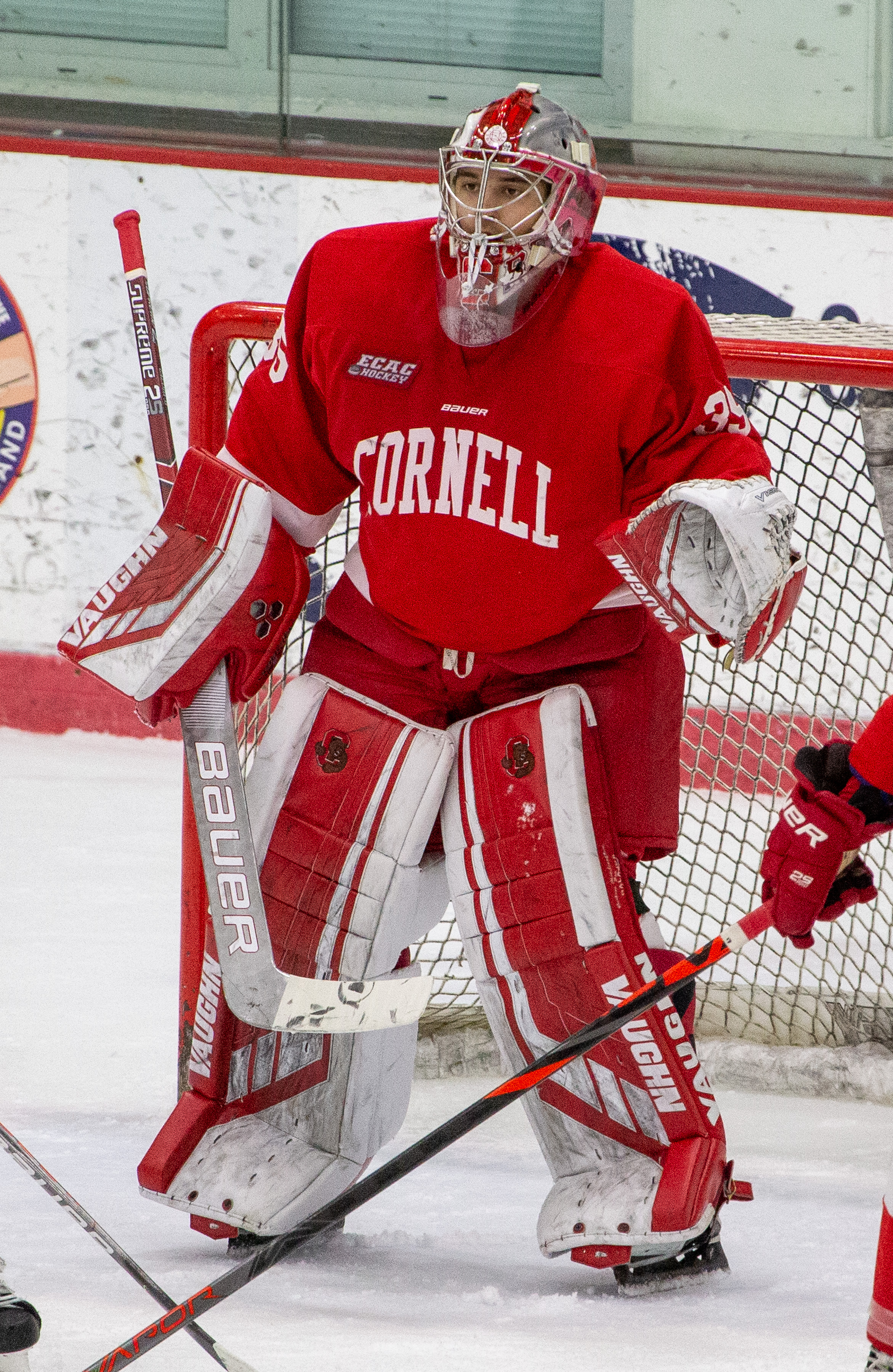
At Cornell in 2020

Galajda joined Cornell for his freshman season in 2017 while majoring in financial real-estate planning. Upon joining team, Galajda immediately became the team's starter over senior Hayden Stewart. During his first 11 games as the starter, Galajda became the second goaltender in program history to record three shutouts in his freshman season. By February, Galajda had recorded six shutouts for sole possession of the school's rookie shutout record and was named the NCAA Rookie of the Month. As the Big Red qualified for the ECAC Hockey Tournament, Galajda received the ECAC Hockey Rookie of the Year Award and was named the only goaltender on the All-ECAC First-Team and All-Rookie Team. After he helped Big Red sweep Quinnipiac University in the tournament quarterfinal series, Galajda became the first Cornell freshman to win the Ken Dryden Award and be named one of 10 finalists for the Hobey Baker Award. Although he remained undrafted, Galajda was invited to the Calgary Flames' Development Camp in July.

Upon returning to Cornell for his sophomore season, Galajda was named to the All-ECAC Hockey Preseason Team. However, he had a slow start to the season and missed playing time due to an injury. He returned to the lineup on January 1, 2019, and led the conference with a 1.59 goals against average and .934 save percentage. As a result of his sophomore success, Galajda was again named a finalist for the Ken Dryden Award and was selected for the All-ECAC Hockey Third Team. Although the Big Red qualified for the ECAC championship game, Galajda suffered a knee injury in overtime and was forced to miss both NCAA Tournament games in order to recover.

Galajda spent the offseason recovering from the injury but returned to Cornell for the 2019–20 season. Upon returning, Cornell head coach Mike Schafer praised his work ethic and attitude saying, "He came in with a different attitude this fall. And he's been outstanding for us...I think he's done a great job as far as his work ethic and competitiveness during the week." Although the 2019–20 season was cut short due to the COVID-19 pandemic, Galajda received multiple honours from across the conference. In February 2020, Galajda was named to the ECAC Hockey All-Decade Team alongside goaltender Kyle Hayton. Following this, he was named one of 10 semifinalists for the Mike Richter Award and one of three finalists for the Ken Dryden Award.

As a result of the pandemic, the Ivy Council allowed senior student-athletes to play as graduate students during the 2021–22 season. In spite of this, Galajda opted to transfer to the University of Notre Dame for both graduate school and his final collegiate season.

=== Professional ===
==== Djurgårdens IF ====
As an undrafted free agent, Galajda opted to begin his professional career abroad in Sweden, agreeing to a one-year contract for the 2022–23 season with newly relegated Djurgårdens IF in the second tier HockeyAllsvenskan on July 25, 2022.

Awards and achievements
Preceded by Kyle Hayton	Ken Dryden Award; 2017–18	Succeeded by Andrew Shortridge
Preceded by Adam Fox	ECAC Hockey Rookie of the Year; 2017–18	Succeeded by Casey Dornbach
