= Will Graber =

American ice hockey player (born 1996)

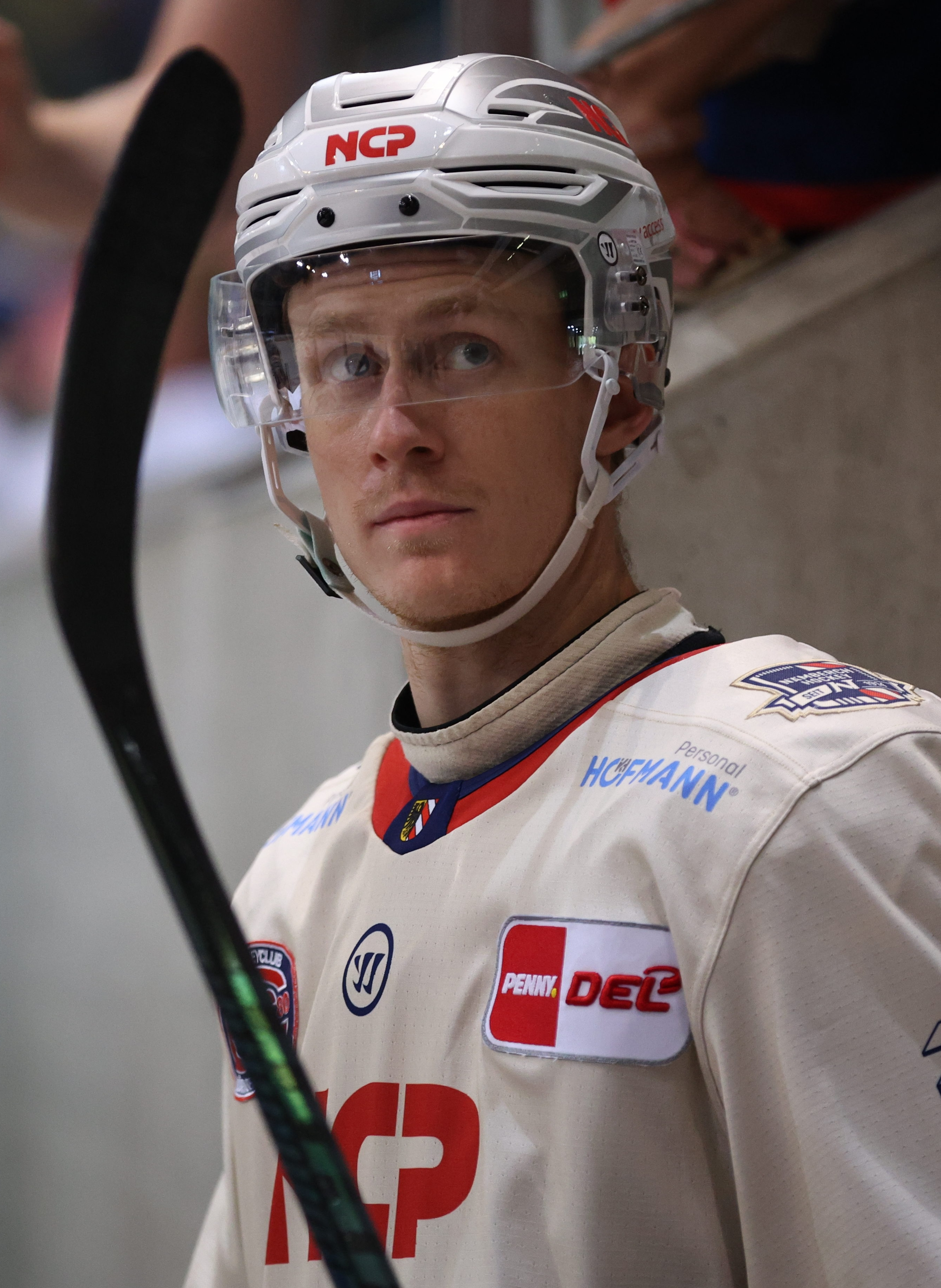
- Graber with the Nürnberg Ice Tigers in 2024
- Born: June 3, 1996 (age 29) Broomfield, Colorado, U.S.
- Height: 195 cm (6 ft 5 in)
- Weight: 86 kg (190 lb; 13 st 8 lb)
- Position: Center
- Shoots: Right
- DEL team Former teams: Nürnberg Ice Tigers; Hershey Bears; Ässät
- NHL draft: Undrafted
- Playing career: 2020–present

William Graber (born June 3, 1996) is an American professional ice hockey center currently playing for Grizzlys Wolfsburg of the Deutsche Eishockey Liga (DEL). He can also play as a defenceman.

== Playing career ==
In the 2021–2022 season, Graber played for the Fort Wayne Komets of the ECHL in 59 games, and scoring 83 points. He had the best plus/minus in the league (+37), most assists (57) and most points (83). He was selected as the most valuable player in the ECHL.

Graber signed a 1+1 style contract with Ässät of the Liiga. Graber made his Liiga debut playing in the 2nd line with Jesse Joensuu and Joachim Rohdin on 14 September 2022 in a game against Ilves. Ässät used their right to keep Graber for one more season, therefore, Graber's contract was extended to the 2023–24 Liiga season.

== Career statistics ==
			Regular season					Playoffs
Season	Team	League	GP	G	A	Pts	PIM	GP	G	A	Pts	PIM
2013–14	Brookings Blizzard	NAHL	25	0	3	3	12	—	—	—	—	—
2013–14	Sioux Falls Stampede	USHL	19	0	0	0	16	1	0	0	0	0
2014–15	Sioux Falls Stampede	USHL	20	4	6	10	8	—	—	—	—	—
2014–15	Muskegon Lumberjacks	USHL	36	0	5	5	63	12	1	0	1	12
2015–16	Muskegon Lumberjacks	USHL	42	7	13	20	65	—	—	—	—	—
2015–16	Fargo Force	USHL	17	2	4	6	12	—	—	—	—	—
2016–17	Dartmouth College	ECAC	29	5	14	19	22	—	—	—	—	—
2017–18	Dartmouth College	ECAC	35	9	17	26	27	—	—	—	—	—
2018–19	Dartmouth College	ECAC	33	10	15	25	36	—	—	—	—	—
2019–20	Dartmouth College	ECAC	26	11	16	27	30	—	—	—	—	—
2020–21	Hershey Bears	AHL	20	1	3	4	10	—	—	—	—	—
2020–21	South Carolina Stingrays	ECHL	11	0	1	1	18	—	—	—	—	—
2021–22	Hershey Bears	AHL	2	0	0	0	0	—	—	—	—	—
2021–22	Fort Wayne Komets	ECHL	59	26	57	83	81	7	2	2	4	4
2022–23	Ässät	Liiga	57	6	17	23	36	8	0	0	0	8
2023–24	Ässät	Liiga	58	6	15	21	56	—	—	—	—	—
2024–25	Nürnberg Ice Tigers	DEL	51	10	31	41	64	9	2	4	6	16
Liiga totals			115	12	32	44	92	8	0	0	0	8
