= Ivy Council =

American non-profit organization

- Type: Non-Profit
- Established: 1990
- Location: United States of America
- Mission: Global Leadership through Public Service
- Website: www.ivy-council.org

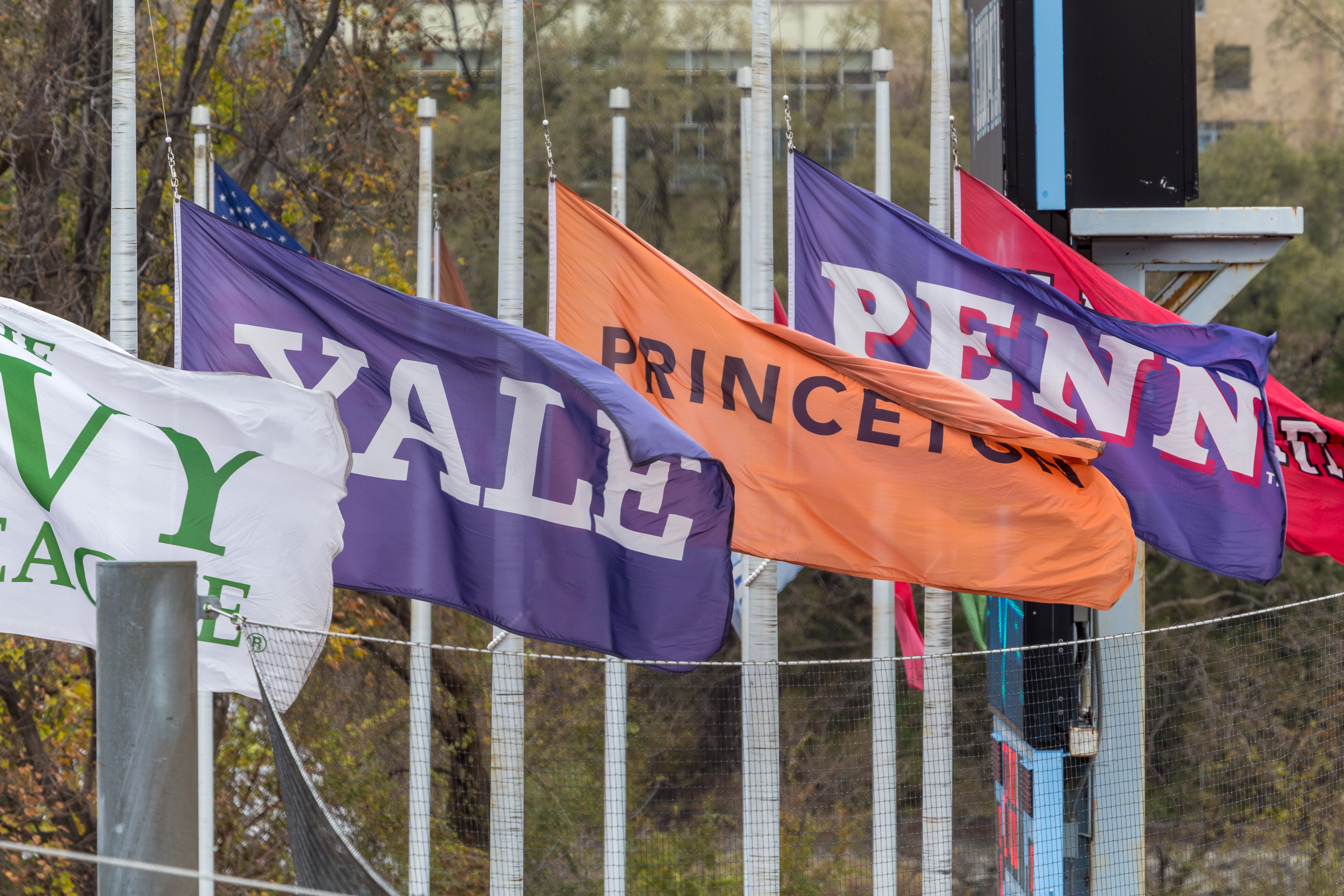
Flags of the Ivy League

The Ivy Council is a non-profit organization of Ivy League student government leaders, student organization leaders, and students at-large. It was established in 1990 by members of the Ivy League student governments to facilitate communication among themselves and to speak with a unified voice. In 2020, the organization was restructured and expanded its focus beyond the Ivy League.

== Establishment ==
The council was founded in 1990 by students at Harvard University, Columbia University, Princeton University, Yale University, the University of Pennsylvania, Brown University, Dartmouth College, and Cornell University. Members are drawn from the various student governments, including Columbia University's Columbia College Student Council, Columbia Engineering Student Council, and Columbia General Studies Student Council; Cornell University Student Assembly; Dartmouth College Student Assembly; Harvard University Undergraduate Council; University of Pennsylvania Undergraduate Assembly; Princeton University Undergraduate Student Government; Yale College Council; and Brown University Undergraduate Council of Students.

== Programs ==
The Ivy Council strives to cultivate and support future leaders in business, politics, academia, tech, and more of the United States of America and the world. It supports leadership training.

The Ivy Council hosts conferences that draw student leaders from the Ivy League and partner organizations. The Ivy Leadership Congress (ILC) is an annual conference hosted by the Ivy Council to bring together students leaders from the eight Ivy League universities along with leaders from the business, government, academics, and non-profit sectors of society. The conference venue is rotated each year through the campuses of the schools in the Ivy League. ILC aims to promote the exchange of ideas between students of the Ivy League and today's leaders on subjects of public policy such as university safety and ethics in science and technology. Annually, eighty participants are selected from a pool of hundreds of applicants from throughout the Ivy League. International student leaders and partner organizations are invited to offer global perspectives and deepen cooperations with the Ivy Council. The main activities of the conference are keynote speakers, panels, and roundtable discussions. Conferences conclude with an annual report of the Ivy Council, highlighting the achievements of the past year and charting the vision for the coming year. Past speakers have included Steve Forbes, chairman and CEO of Forbes magazine; Nasreen Berwari, Iraqi Minister of Municipalities and General Works; Jeffrey Sachs, special adviser to the UN's Sustainable Development Goals; Theodore Roosevelt IV, managing director at Lehman Brothers and prominent environmentalist; Dov Zakheim, U.S. Undersecretary of Defense; Dan Rosensweig, CEO of Chegg; Henry Blodget, CEO of Business Insider, and U.S. Senator Cory Booker.

Since 2016, the Ivy Council has been involved in the Youth 20 process of the G20.

Since 2018, it has run the Youth Development Goals (YDGs), and effort to increase youth involvement in national and international politics.

The organization added programs in 2020, including the Ivy Ambassadors Initiative, Tech for Public Service, and the Ivy Scholars Initiative and Ivy Fellowship.

Members of the Ivy Council have gone on to become members of the U.S. Senate and leaders of national non-profits.

== Partners ==
The Ivy Council works with other organizations, including Ivy League student organizations, non-profits, and international organizations. It has also worked with U.S. universities it labels the Ivy+: UC Berkeley, UCLA, UCSD, Duke University, Stanford University, USC, Johns Hopkins University, the University of Chicago, George Washington University, Georgetown University, Vanderbilt University and others.

It has also worked with foreign universities, including the University of British Columbia (Canada), Soka University (Japan), Oxford University (United Kingdom), University of Cambridge (United Kingdom), the London School of Economics (United Kingdom), Sciences Po (France), University of Copenhagen (Denmark), Luiss University (Italy), Bocconi University (Italy), University of Bologna (Italy), Corvinus University of Budapest (Hungary), Leiden University (Netherlands), University of Zurich (Switzerland), University of Buenos Aires (Argentina), Jawaharlal Nehru University (India), University of Dhaka (Bangladesh), and Hong Kong University, (Hong Kong SAR).

The Ivy Council has relations with organizations in more than 25 countries, including Europe, Asia, and Latin American.

== Leaders ==
Historically student delegates from each of the member schools maintained a Steering Committee for day-to-day operations. The Steering Committee consisted of Secretariat Heads and the Head Delegates of the eight member schools. Head Delegates were selected by the Steering Committee from the member institutions and were entrusted to represent their respective schools in the interim between meetings of the council. The restructuring process in 2020 changed the leadership structure of the organization.

== Controversies ==
In 2005, member institutions of the Ivy Council withdrew from the organization due to a lack of organization. Some member institutions also expressed lackluster interest in the Ivy Council, with minimal participation in the conferences. They rejoined the Ivy Council in 2006 following a restructuring of the organization.
