= Matt Stienburg =

Canadian ice hockey player (born 2000)

- Born: October 7, 2000 (age 26) Halifax, Nova Scotia, Canada
- Height: 6 ft 1 in (185 cm)
- Weight: 183 lb (83 kg; 13 st 1 lb)
- Position: Centre
- Shoots: Right
- NHL team (P) Cur. team Former teams: Vancouver Canucks; Abbotsford Canucks (AHL); Colorado Avalanche
- NHL draft: 63rd overall, 2019; Colorado Avalanche
- Playing career: 2023–present

Matthew Stienburg (born October 7, 2000) is a Canadian professional ice hockey centre currently playing for the Abbotsford Canucks of the American Hockey League (AHL) while under contract to the Vancouver Canucks of the National Hockey League (NHL).

== Playing career ==
=== Amateur ===
As a youth, Stienburg played in his hometown Halifax, Nova Scotia, for the Halifax McDonald's in the Nova Scotia U18 Major Hockey League. He played scholastic hockey with St. Andrew's College in Aurora, Ontario from 2017 to 2019, collecting 60 goals and 68 assists for 128 points in only 93 CAHS league games. In his two-year tenure with the Saints, he helped win the league championship two years in a row and served as team captain his second season in 2018–19. Before commencing his collegiate career, Stienburg joined the Sioux City Musketeers of the United States Hockey League (USHL) at the tail end of the campaign and registered 1 point in 3 games. In his first year of eligibility, Stienburg was selected by the Colorado Avalanche in the third-round, 63rd overall, of the 2019 NHL entry draft, joining his father Trevor in being selected by the same franchise, the then Quebec Nordiques.

In committing to Cornell University of the ECAC Hockey conference, Stienburg as a freshman in the 2019–20 season contributed in a depth forward role with 5 goals and 10 points through 27 appearances. He ranked first among all ECAC rookies with a +12 rating. He did not play during the 2020–21 campaign due to the COVID-19 pandemic leading to the cancellation of the Ivy League season.

As a junior in the 2021–22 season, Stienburg elevated his offensive contributions in leading the Big Red in scoring with 13 goals and 29 points through 28 games. He was named to All-ECAC Hockey Second Team and earned an honorable mention in the All-Ivy Team.

Stienburg endured an injury plagued senior season with Cornell in 2022–23, limited to just 18 games as a senior in notching just 2 goals and 7 points. Opting to conclude his collegiate career, Stienburg joined the Colorado Eagles of the AHL on an amateur try-out to conclude the 2022–23 season on March 31, 2023. In making his professional debut with the Eagles, he posted 1 assist through 4 regular season contests and matching his output in the Calder Cup playoffs.

=== Professional ===
==== Colorado Avalanche ====
On August 18, 2023, Stienburg was signed by his draft club, the Colorado Avalanche, to a two-year, entry-level contract. In his first full professional year, Stienburg was reassigned to continue his tenure with AHL affiliate, the Colorado Eagles, for the duration of the 2023–24 season. In showing his physicality through a checking line role, Stienburg posted 5 goals and 13 points through 54 appearances with the Eagles.

After a strong opening with the Eagles in the following 2024–25 season, Stienburg received his first recall to the injury depleted Avalanche on October 16, 2024. He made NHL debut with Colorado, centering the fourth-line alongside Joel Kiviranta and Ivan Ivan. He recorded his first career fight against former Avalanche, Nikita Zadorov, helping spark Colorado to mount an comeback in an eventual 5–3 defeat to the Boston Bruins. In his eighth game with the Avalanche, Stienburg was assessed a game misconduct for charging and ejected following a late hit to defenseman Erik Černák of the Tampa Bay Lightning. Following the 5–2 defeat to the Lightning, Stienburg faced a player safety meeting and was subsequently suspended 2 games on November 1, 2024. Before serving the suspension, Stienburg was reassigned by the Avalanche to the Colorado Eagles due to salary cap constraints.

In the following 2025–26 season, Stienburg's familiar struggles with injuries continued, limited to just 8 regular season appearances with the Colorado Eagles. As a pending restricted free agent at the conclusion of his contract, Stienburg was not tendered a qualifying offer by the Avalanche and was released as a free agent.

==== Vancouver Canucks ====
On July 2, 2026, Stienburg was signed to a one-year, two-way contract for the 2026–27 season with the Vancouver Canucks.

== Personal ==
Matthew’s father, Trevor Stienburg, also played nine years of professional hockey, including 71 games with the NHL's Quebec Nordiques. He is currently a professional scout with the Seattle Kraken.

== Career statistics ==
			Regular season					Playoffs
Season	Team	League	GP	G	A	Pts	PIM	GP	G	A	Pts	PIM
2015–16	Halifax McDonald's	NSMMHL	16	3	5	8	14	—	—	—	—	—
2016–17	Halifax McDonald's	NSMMHL	36	11	36	47	44	9	1	3	4	2
2017–18	St. Andrew's College	CAHS	45	29	33	62	52	—	—	—	—	—
2018–19	St. Andrew's College	CAHS	48	31	35	66	70	—	—	—	—	—
2018–19	Sioux City Musketeers	USHL	3	0	1	1	15	—	—	—	—	—
2019–20	Cornell University	ECAC	27	5	5	10	45	—	—	—	—	—
2021–22	Cornell University	ECAC	28	13	16	29	30	—	—	—	—	—
2022–23	Cornell University	ECAC	18	2	5	7	18	—	—	—	—	—
2022–23	Colorado Eagles	AHL	4	0	1	1	5	4	0	1	1	4
2023–24	Colorado Eagles	AHL	54	5	8	13	63	—	—	—	—	—
2024–25	Colorado Eagles	AHL	5	1	2	3	2	3	0	0	0	2
2024–25	Colorado Avalanche	NHL	8	0	0	0	22	—	—	—	—	—
2025–26	Colorado Eagles	AHL	8	2	1	3	11	—	—	—	—	—
NHL totals			8	0	0	0	22	—	—	—	—	—

== Awards and honours ==
Award	Year
College
ECAC Second All-Star Team	2022
NCAA All-Ivy League Honorable Mention Team	2022
