= Travis Mitchell =

American ice hockey player (born 1999)

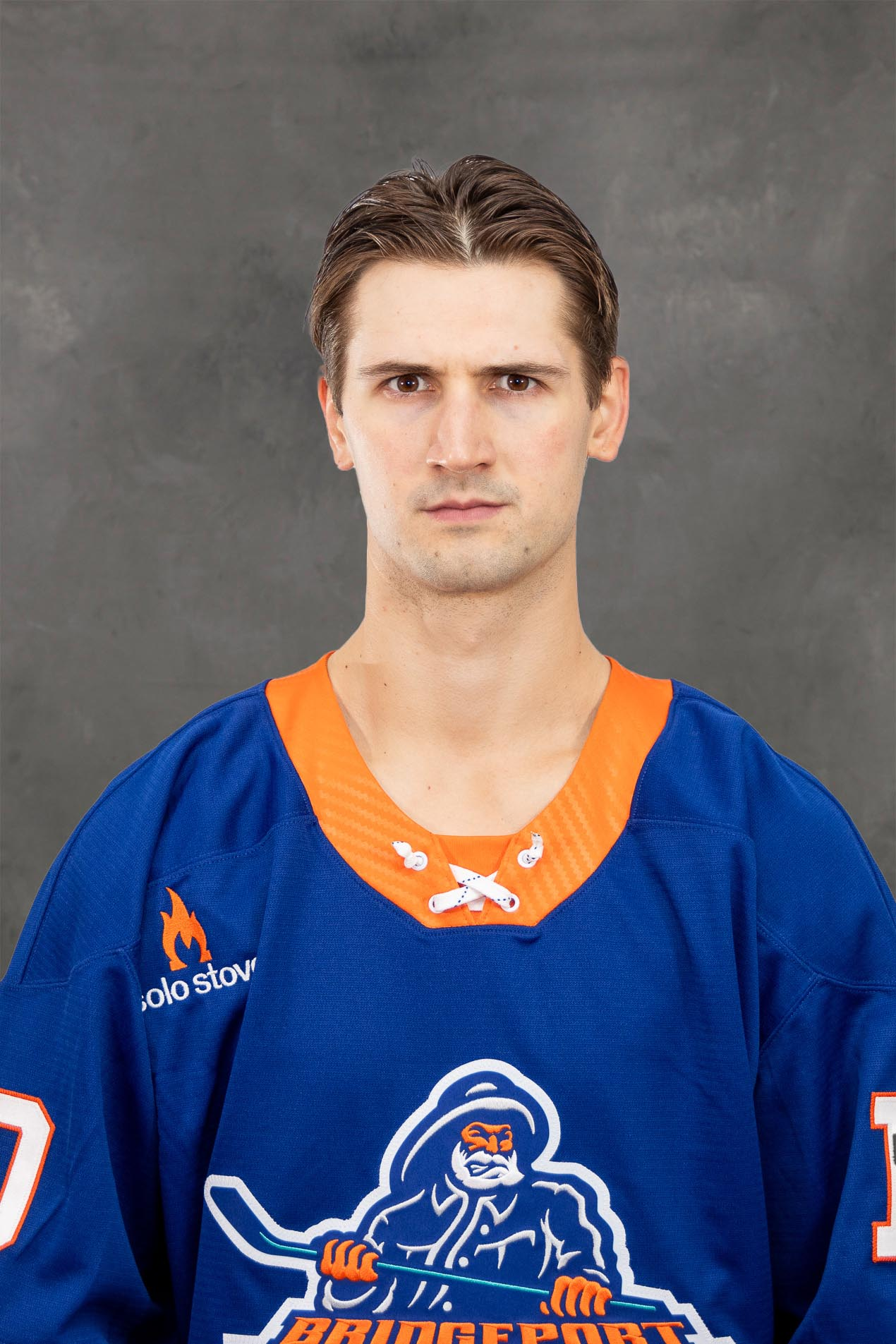
- Mitchell in 2024
- Born: November 25, 1999 (age 26) South Lyon, Michigan, U.S.
- Height: 6 ft 4 in (193 cm)
- Weight: 205 lb (93 kg; 14 st 9 lb)
- Position: Defence
- Shoots: Left
- NHL team (P) Cur. team Former teams: Anaheim Ducks; San Diego Gulls (AHL); New York Islanders
- NHL draft: Undrafted
- Playing career: 2023–present

Travis Mitchell (born November 25, 1999) is an American ice hockey defenseman who plays for the San Diego Gulls in the American Hockey League (AHL) as a prospect under contract to the Anaheim Ducks of the National Hockey League (NHL). Going undrafted, he played collegiate hockey for Cornell University.

== Playing career ==
Mitchell was undrafted but was signed as a free agent by the Islanders after completing his college career in 2023. He had had a tryout with the Boston Bruins in 2021 but wasn't signed.

He started his professional career in 2023 with the Islanders' AHL affiliate Bridgeport Islanders. He was briefly called up to the Islanders during the 2024-25 NHL season but did not get into a game for them.

He was again recalled to the Islanders in November 2025 after recording 3 assists in 12 games for Bridgeport during the 2025-26 AHL season. He made his NHL debut for the Islanders on November 28, 2025, in a game against the Philadelphia Flyers. He scored his first NHL goal, which was also his first NHL point on December 11, 2025, against Anaheim Ducks goalie Ville Husso.

As a free agent after three full seasons within the Islanders organization, Mitchell was signed to a one-year, two-way contract with the Anaheim Ducks on July 1, 2026.

== Personal ==
His father, Jeff Mitchell played in the NHL for the Dallas Stars.

== Career statistics ==
			Regular season					Playoffs
Season	Team	League	GP	G	A	Pts	PIM	GP	G	A	Pts	PIM
2016–17	Muskegon Lumberjacks	USHL	38	2	4	6	33	4	0	0	0	0
2017–18	Muskegon Lumberjacks	USHL	3	0	0	0	0	—	—	—	—	—
2017–18	Omaha Lancers	USHL	53	4	10	14	84	4	0	0	0	2
2018–19	Omaha Lancers	USHL	58	3	26	29	53	—	—	—	—	—
2019–20	Cornell University	ECAC	29	2	10	12	29	—	—	—	—	—
2021–22	Cornell University	ECAC	32	3	13	16	40	—	—	—	—	—
2022–23	Cornell University	ECAC	34	6	13	19	20	—	—	—	—	—
2022–23	Bridgeport Islanders	AHL	6	0	0	0	7	—	—	—	—	—
2023–24	Bridgeport Islanders	AHL	34	1	3	4	36	—	—	—	—	—
2024–25	Bridgeport Islanders	AHL	65	4	9	13	101	—	—	—	—	—
2025–26	Bridgeport Islanders	AHL	58	1	16	17	87	2	0	0	0	2
2025–26	New York Islanders	NHL	9	1	0	1	6	—	—	—	—	—
NHL totals			9	1	0	1	6	—	—	—	—	—
