= Jack St. Ivany =

American ice hockey player (born 1999)

- St. Ivany at the 2023 AHL Outdoor Classic
- Born: July 22, 1999 (age 27) Manhattan Beach, California
- Height: 6 ft 3 in (191 cm)
- Weight: 198 lb (90 kg; 14 st 2 lb)
- Position: Defense
- Shoots: Right
- NHL team Former teams: Washington Capitals; Pittsburgh Penguins; Winnipeg Jets
- NHL draft: 112th overall, 2018; Philadelphia Flyers
- Playing career: 2022–present

John St. Ivany (born July 22, 1999) is an American professional ice hockey player who is a defenseman for the Washington Capitals in the National Hockey League (NHL).

== Early life ==
St. Ivany is originally from Manhattan Beach, California.

== Playing career ==
St. Ivany played youth hockey for the Los Angeles Jr. Kings, and then played junior hockey for the Sioux Falls Stampede of the United States Hockey League (USHL).

St. Ivany was selected by the Philadelphia Flyers in the fourth round, 112th overall, of the 2018 NHL entry draft.

St. Ivany played college hockey for Yale from 2018 to 2020, and for Boston College from 2020 to 2022. In the 2021–22 season, St. Ivany was named a Hockey East Third-Team All-Star.

At the conclusion of his four-year collegiate career, St. Ivany became a free agent on August 15, 2022. On August 20, 2022, St. Ivany signed a two-year, entry-level contract with the Pittsburgh Penguins.

St. Ivany made his NHL debut on March 22, 2024, in Pittsburgh's game against the Dallas Stars. On April 2, 2024, St. Ivany recorded his first NHL point, assisting on an Evgeni Malkin goal against the New Jersey Devils. On May 21, 2024, St. Ivany re-signed with Pittsburgh on a three-year contract.

Entering the 2025–26 season, on October 2, 2025, the Penguins announced St. Ivany had suffered a lower-body injury, and would miss a minimum of six weeks. He returned from injury and appeared in 20 regular season games with the Penguins, notching a career best 7 assists.

Following four seasons within the Penguins organization, St. Ivany was traded to the Winnipeg Jets in exchange for David Gustafsson on June 29, 2026. In the 2026–27 season, St. Ivany made the Jets opening night roster out of training camp. He made 4 appearances on the blueline in a third-pairing role with Winnipeg before he was placed and claimed off waivers by the Washington Capitals on October 24, 2026.

== International play ==
St. Ivany represented the United States junior team at the 2019 World Junior Ice Hockey Championships.

== Personal life ==
St. Ivany was born to parents Darin and Tricia, and was raised with a brother, Tucker, and a sister, Bella.

== Career statistics ==
=== Regular season and playoffs ===
			Regular season					Playoffs
Season	Team	League	GP	G	A	Pts	PIM	GP	G	A	Pts	PIM
2014–15	Los Angeles Jr. Kings	T1EHL	24	2	6	8	8	—	—	—	—	—
2015–16	Los Angeles Jr. Kings	T1EHL	31	3	10	13	22	4	1	2	3	2
2016–17	Sioux Falls Stampede	USHL	52	1	9	10	14	—	—	—	—	—
2017–18	Sioux Falls Stampede	USHL	54	6	30	36	30	3	1	2	3	2
2018–19	Yale University	ECAC	30	6	8	14	20	—	—	—	—	—
2019–20	Yale University	ECAC	32	1	15	16	18	—	—	—	—	—
2020–21	Boston College	HE	18	1	5	6	6	—	—	—	—	—
2021–22	Boston College	HE	35	4	20	24	6	—	—	—	—	—
2022–23	Wilkes-Barre/Scranton Penguins	AHL	63	0	8	8	33	—	—	—	—	—
2023–24	Wilkes-Barre/Scranton Penguins	AHL	54	4	11	15	30	2	0	0	0	0
2023–24	Pittsburgh Penguins	NHL	14	0	1	1	2	—	—	—	—	—
2024–25	Pittsburgh Penguins	NHL	19	0	1	1	17	—	—	—	—	—
2024–25	Wilkes-Barre/Scranton Penguins	AHL	37	1	15	16	25	2	0	0	0	0
2025–26	Wilkes-Barre/Scranton Penguins	AHL	8	1	5	6	4	—	—	—	—	—
2025–26	Pittsburgh Penguins	NHL	20	0	7	7	6	—	—	—	—	—
2026–27	Winnipeg Jets	NHL	4	0	0	0	2	—	—	—	—	—
NHL totals			57	0	9	9	27	—	—	—	—	—

=== International ===
Medal record

Representing United States

Ice hockey

World Junior Championships
Silver medal – second place	2019 Canada	

Year	Team	Event	Result	GP	G	A	Pts	PIM
2019	United States	WJC	2nd place, silver medalist(s)	7	0	0	0	0
Junior totals				7	0	0	0	0

== Awards and honors ==
Award	Year
USHL
Third All-Star Team	2018
College
HE Third All-Star Team	2022
